= 2022 UEFA Women's Under-19 Championship squads =

Player listing of women's football competition

This article describes about the squads for the 2022 UEFA Women's Under-19 Championship.

== Group A ==
=== Czech Republic ===
Head coach: Jan Navrátil

No.	Pos.	Player	Date of birth (age)	Club
1	GK	Bára Beránková	27 March 2003 (aged 19)	(Czech Republic) FK Pardubice
16	GK	Tereza Fuchsová	20 March 2003 (aged 19)	(Czech Republic) SK Slavia Praha
2	DF	Nikola Pražienková	25 July 2004 (aged 17)	(Czech Republic) SK Slavia Praha
3	DF	Dominika Huvarová	2 May 2003 (aged 19)	(Czech Republic) SK Slavia Praha
4	DF	Terezie Ohlídalová	2 March 2003 (aged 19)	(Czech Republic) 1. FC Slovácko
5	DF	Natálie Trčková	6 February 2004 (aged 18)	(Czech Republic) 1. FC Slovácko
8	DF	Andrea Kochanová	11 February 2004 (aged 18)	(Czech Republic) FK Pardubice
13	DF	Lucie Jelínková	19 January 2003 (aged 19)	(Czech Republic) 1. FC Slovácko
6	MF	Denisa Tenkrátová	1 November 2004 (aged 17)	(Czech Republic) SK Slavia Praha
10	MF	Radka Hlouchová	25 January 2004 (aged 18)	(Czech Republic) FK Pardubice
11	MF	Aneta Tomanová	4 August 2003 (aged 18)	(Czech Republic) AC Sparta Praha
14	MF	Lucie Bendová	3 April 2005 (aged 17)	(Czech Republic) SK Slavia Praha
17	MF	Denisa Jonášová	30 November 2003 (aged 18)	(Czech Republic) 1. FC Slovácko
18	MF	Šárka Pouvová	29 November 2003 (aged 18)	(Czech Republic) FC Slovan Liberec
19	MF	Jaroslava Pavlíčková	17 June 2004 (aged 18)	(Czech Republic) FC Viktoria Plzeň
21	MF	Andrea Švíbková	10 July 2004 (aged 17)	(Czech Republic) AC Sparta Praha
7	FW	Klára Ducháčková	26 May 2004 (aged 18)	(Czech Republic) AC Sparta Praha
9	FW	Kim Dinh Thanhová	25 January 2003 (aged 19)	(Czech Republic) FC Slovan Liberec
12	FW	Sabina Střížová	22 January 2004 (aged 18)	(Czech Republic) 1. FC Slovácko
20	FW	Tereza Černá	8 April 2004 (aged 18)	(Czech Republic) FC Slovan Liberec

=== Italy ===
Head coach: Enrico Maria Sbardella

No.	Pos.	Player	Date of birth (age)	Club
1	GK	Beatrice Beretta	1 July 2003 (aged 18)	(Italy) Tavagnacco
22	GK	Astrid Gilardi	19 February 2003 (aged 19)	(Italy) Inter
2	DF	Sofia Bertucci	30 July 2004 (aged 17)	(Italy) Juventus
3	DF	Chiara Robustellini	30 June 2003 (aged 18)	(Italy) Inter
4	DF	Marika Massimino	5 December 2003 (aged 18)	(Italy) Roma
5	DF	Angela Passeri	21 July 2004 (aged 17)	(Italy) Inter
6	DF	Alice Pellinghelli	17 June 2003 (aged 19)	(Italy) Sassuolo
15	DF	Elena Battistini	10 August 2003 (aged 18)	(Italy) Roma
13	MF	Emma Severini	18 July 2003 (aged 18)	(Italy) Napoli
14	MF	Anastasia Ferrara	23 October 2004 (aged 17)	(Italy) Roma
16	MF	Eva Schatzer	16 January 2005 (aged 17)	(Italy) Juventus
18	MF	Patrizia Cerasini	1 April 2005 (aged 17)	(Italy) Lazio
19	MF	Matilde Pavan	12 June 2004 (aged 18)	(Italy) Inter
20	MF	Giorgia Arrigoni	4 October 2004 (aged 17)	(Italy) Hellas Verona
7	FW	Alice Corelli	28 November 2003 (aged 18)	(Italy) Roma
8	FW	Victoria Della Peruta	21 March 2004 (aged 18)	(Italy) Pomigliano
9	FW	Chiara Beccari	27 September 2004 (aged 17)	(Italy) Juventus
10	FW	Nicole Arcangeli	23 October 2003 (aged 18)	(Italy) Juventus
11	FW	Elisa Pfattner	26 May 2004 (aged 18)	(Italy) Juventus
17	FW	Alice Berti	31 August 2003 (aged 18)	(Italy) Sampdoria

=== Spain ===
Head coach: Pedro López

No.	Pos.	Player	Date of birth (age)	Club
1	GK	Meritxell Font	10 December 2004 (aged 17)	(Spain) FC Barcelona
13	GK	Jana Xin	29 September 2003 (aged 18)	(Spain) Deportivo Alavés
2	DF	Martina Fernández	1 October 2004 (aged 17)	(Spain) FC Barcelona
3	DF	Andrea Medina	11 May 2004 (aged 18)	(Spain) Real Betis Balompié
4	DF	Amaia Martínez	29 June 2004 (aged 17)	(Spain) Athletic Club
5	DF	María Valle	14 November 2004 (aged 17)	(Spain) Real Betis Balompié
8	DF	Silvia Lloris	15 May 2004 (aged 18)	(Spain) Levante UD
12	DF	Esther Laborde	20 April 2004 (aged 18)	(Spain) FC Barcelona
19	DF	Ane Elexpuru	2 May 2003 (aged 19)	(Spain) Athletic Club
6	MF	Ariadna Mingueza	22 March 2003 (aged 19)	(Spain) FC Barcelona
10	MF	Julia Bartel	18 May 2004 (aged 18)	(Spain) FC Barcelona
11	MF	Fiamma Benítez	19 June 2004 (aged 18)	(Spain) Levante UD
14	MF	Alba Caño	30 September 2003 (aged 18)	(Spain) FC Barcelona
15	MF	Clara Pinedo	9 September 2003 (aged 18)	(Spain) Athletic Club
16	MF	Maite Zubieta	28 May 2004 (aged 18)	(Spain) Athletic Club
7	FW	Ornella Vignola	30 September 2004 (aged 17)	(Spain) FC Barcelona
9	FW	Carmen Álvarez	24 February 2003 (aged 19)	(Spain) SD Eibar
17	FW	Ona Baradad	16 April 2004 (aged 18)	(Spain) FC Barcelona
18	FW	Lucía Moral	11 February 2004 (aged 18)	(Spain) Córdoba CF
20	FW	Mirari Uria	1 January 2003 (aged 19)	(Spain) Real Sociedad de Fútbol

=== France ===
Head coach: Sandrine Ringler

No.	Pos.	Player	Date of birth (age)	Club
1	GK	Inès Marques	25 March 2004 (aged 18)	(France) Paris FC
16	GK	Emma Francart	31 January 2004 (aged 18)	(France) Stade de Reims
2	DF	Marion Haelewyn	30 October 2004 (aged 17)	(France) Girondins de Bordeaux
3	DF	Léa Notel	3 October 2004 (aged 17)	(France) Stade de Reims
4	DF	Jade Rastocle	12 July 2004 (aged 17)	(France) Stade de Reims
5	DF	Éloïse Sévenne	22 January 2003 (aged 19)	(France) Rodez AF
13	DF	Margaux Vairon	24 April 2003 (aged 19)	(France) Dijon Football Côte d'Or
14	DF	Maïwen Renard	4 April 2003 (aged 19)	(France) En Avant Guingamp
6	MF	Chloé Neller	13 May 2004 (aged 18)	(France) Paris FC
8	MF	Inès Kbida	10 May 2003 (aged 19)	(France) US Orléans Loiret Football
10	MF	Adja Binaté Soumahoro	7 May 2003 (aged 19)	(France) Paris FC
15	MF	Faustine Bataillard	3 August 2004 (aged 17)	(France) Saint-Étienne
17	MF	Judith Coquet	5 August 2003 (aged 18)	(France) Montpellier Hérault SC
19	MF	Inès Benyahia	26 March 2003 (aged 19)	(France) Olympique Lyonnais Féminin
7	FW	Madeleine Yetna	9 April 2004 (aged 18)	(France) Dijon Football Côte d'Or
9	FW	Louna Ribadeira	18 August 2004 (aged 17)	(France) Paris FC
11	FW	Airine Fontaine	20 August 2004 (aged 17)	(France) Paris FC
12	FW	Nesrine Bahlouli	20 February 2003 (aged 19)	(France) Olympique Lyonnais Féminin
18	FW	Pauline Haugou	29 September 2004 (aged 17)	(France) LOSC Lille Association
20	FW	Noémie Mouchon	6 June 2003 (aged 19)	(France) LOSC Lille Association

== Group B ==
=== Sweden ===
Head coach: Caroline Sjöblom

No.	Pos.	Player	Date of birth (age)	Club
1	GK	Serina Iddrisu Backmark	21 April 2003 (aged 19)	(Sweden) AIK
12	MF	Elvira Björklund	20 January 2004 (aged 18)	(Sweden) Djurgårdens IF FF
2	DF	Elma Junttila Nelhage	21 May 2003 (aged 19)	(Sweden) BK Häcken FF
3	DF	Athinna Persson Lundgren	3 April 2003 (aged 19)	(Sweden) FC Rosengård
4	DF	Sofia Reidy	15 March 2004 (aged 18)	(Sweden) Jitex BK
5	DF	Anna Sandberg	23 May 2003 (aged 19)	(Sweden) KIF Örebro DFF
6	DF	Hanna Wijk	15 December 2003 (aged 18)	(Sweden) BK Häcken FF
15	DF	Evelina Duljan	12 May 2003 (aged 19)	(Sweden) Kristianstads DFF
16	DF	Lisa Löwing	14 September 2004 (aged 17)	(Sweden) BK Häcken FF
7	MF	Emilia Pelgander	3 March 2004 (aged 18)	(Sweden) KIF Örebro DFF
8	MF	Sara Eriksson	9 June 2003 (aged 19)	(Sweden) Hammarby IF
11	MF	Emilia Bengtsson	20 June 2003 (aged 19)	(Sweden) IF Brommapojkarna
13	MF	Matilda Vinberg	16 March 2003 (aged 19)	(Sweden) Hammarby IF
14	MF	Alma Öberg	9 May 2003 (aged 19)	(Sweden) Alingsås FC United
17	MF	Lisa Björk	11 June 2004 (aged 18)	(Sweden) Umeå IK FF
18	MF	Felicia Jastré Högberg	1 October 2003 (aged 18)	(Sweden) Jitex BK
9	FW	Svea Rehnberg	21 June 2004 (aged 18)	(Sweden) Mallbackens IF Sunne
10	FW	Bea Sprung	30 January 2005 (aged 17)	(Sweden) FC Rosengård
19	FW	Matilda Nildén	10 November 2004 (aged 17)	(Sweden) AIK
20	FW	Wilma Leidhammar	16 June 2003 (aged 19)	(Sweden) BK Astrio

=== Norway ===
Head coach: Hege Riise

No.	Pos.	Player	Date of birth (age)	Club
1	GK	Selma Panengstuen	5 March 2003 (aged 19)	(Norway) Kolbotn
12	GK	Una Langkås	16 July 2003 (aged 18)	(Norway) Øvrevoll Hosle
2	DF	Thea Sørbo	28 March 2003 (aged 19)	(Norway) Kolbotn
3	DF	Selma Pettersen	21 February 2003 (aged 19)	(Norway) Stabæk
4	DF	Kaja Olsen	7 January 2004 (aged 18)	(Norway) Avaldsnes
5	DF	Selma Løvås	4 November 2003 (aged 18)	(Norway) Avaldsnes
13	DF	Maria Fink	25 January 2004 (aged 18)	(Norway) Lyn
15	DF	Oda Johansen	28 July 2004 (aged 17)	(Norway) LSK Kvinner
18	DF	Casandra Lüthcke	8 January 2003 (aged 19)	(Norway) LSK Kvinner
6	MF	Julie Jorde	16 April 2004 (aged 18)	(Norway) Lyn
7	MF	Stine Brekken	19 December 2004 (aged 17)	(Norway) Vålerenga
8	MF	Irene Dirdal	22 September 2003 (aged 18)	(Norway) LSK Kvinner
16	MF	Ingeborg Lye Skretting	9 January 2003 (aged 19)	(Norway) Klepp
17	MF	Emma Iversen	1 March 2004 (aged 18)	(Norway) Røa
19	MF	Synne Brønstad	21 June 2003 (aged 19)	(Norway) Rosenborg
9	FW	Iris Omarsdottir	12 July 2003 (aged 18)	(Norway) Stabæk
10	FW	Cathinka Friis Tandberg	18 June 2004 (aged 18)	(Norway) Lyn
11	FW	Thea Kyvåg	9 January 2004 (aged 18)	(Norway) LSK Kvinner
14	FW	Guro Hammer Røn	5 November 2004 (aged 17)	(Norway) AaFK Fortuna
20	FW	Ina Birkelund	31 May 2004 (aged 18)	(Norway) TIL 2020

=== England ===
Head coach: Gemma Davies

No.	Pos.	Player	Date of birth (age)	Club
1	GK	Khiara Keating	27 June 2004 (aged 17)	(England) Manchester City
13	GK	Natalia Negri	2 January 2004 (aged 18)	Unattached
2	DF	Jorja Fox	28 August 2003 (aged 18)	(England) Chelsea
3	DF	Anouk Denton	9 May 2003 (aged 19)	(United States) University of Louisville
5	DF	Ruby Mace	5 September 2003 (aged 18)	(England) Manchester City
6	DF	Tara Bourne	17 July 2003 (aged 18)	(England) Manchester United
12	DF	Lucy Parry	7 May 2004 (aged 18)	(England) Liverpool
15	DF	Neve Herron	27 June 2003 (aged 18)	(England) Sunderland
16	DF	Caitlin Smith	20 May 2003 (aged 19)	(United States) Clemson University
20	DF	Olivia McLoughlin	15 October 2004 (aged 17)	(England) Aston Villa
4	MF	Charlotte Wardlaw	20 February 2003 (aged 19)	(England) Chelsea
8	MF	Maisie Symonds	2 February 2003 (aged 19)	(England) Brighton and Hove Albion
10	MF	Grace Clinton	31 March 2003 (aged 19)	(England) Everton
14	MF	Mia Ross	28 April 2003 (aged 19)	(England) Charlton Athletic
17	MF	Lucia Kendall	20 May 2004 (aged 18)	(England) Southampton
19	MF	Laura Blindkilde Brown	9 September 2003 (aged 18)	(England) Aston Villa
7	FW	Aggie Beever-Jones	27 July 2003 (aged 18)	(England) Chelsea
9	FW	Emily Murphy	2 March 2003 (aged 19)	(United States) University of North Carolina
11	FW	Freya Gregory	12 January 2003 (aged 19)	(England) Aston Villa
18	FW	Lucy Watson	14 November 2003 (aged 18)	(England) Sheffield United

=== Germany ===
Head coach: Kathrin Peter

No.	Pos.	Player	Date of birth (age)	Club
1	GK	Laura Dick	13 June 2003 (aged 19)	(Germany) TSG Hoffenheim
12	GK	Sophia Winkler	29 June 2003 (aged 18)	(Germany) SGS Essen
2	DF	Pauline Deutsch	29 September 2004 (aged 17)	(Germany) Turbine Potsdam
3	DF	Dilara Açıkgöz	2 June 2004 (aged 18)	(Germany) Eintracht Frankfurt
4	DF	Clara Fröhlich	15 March 2004 (aged 18)	(Germany) Bayer Leverkusen
5	DF	Nina Zimmer	16 July 2003 (aged 18)	(United States) NC State Wolfpack
6	DF	Julia Landenberger	22 December 2003 (aged 18)	(Germany) Bayern Munich
8	DF	Alisa Grincenco	14 February 2004 (aged 18)	(Germany) Turbine Potsdam
14	DF	Linette Hofmann	18 August 2004 (aged 17)	(Germany) TSG Hoffenheim
7	MF	Sarah Mattner-Trembleau	11 May 2003 (aged 19)	(Austria) First Vienna FC
9	MF	Felicitas Fee Kockmann	13 December 2004 (aged 17)	(Germany) SGS Essen
10	MF	Mia Büchele	7 October 2003 (aged 18)	(Germany) SC Freiburg
13	MF	İlayda Açıkgöz	2 June 2004 (aged 18)	(Germany) Eintracht Frankfurt
16	MF	Emilia Deppe	27 December 2004 (aged 17)	(Germany) SV Lippstadt
17	MF	Yara Volpert	10 April 2004 (aged 18)	(Germany) SV Elversberg
18	MF	Sophie Nachtigall	12 April 2004 (aged 18)	(Germany) Hamburger SV
20	MF	Sofie Zdebel	8 August 2004 (aged 17)	(Germany) Bayer Leverkusen
11	FW	Franziska Kett	24 October 2004 (aged 17)	(Germany) Bayern Munich
15	FW	Larissa Mühlhaus	13 January 2003 (aged 19)	(Germany) Hamburger SV
19	FW	Laureta Elmazi	26 June 2003 (aged 19)	(Germany) SGS Essen
