= 2022 FIFA U-20 Women's World Cup final =

- Event: 2022 FIFA U-20 Women's World Cup
| Spain | Japan |
| (Spain) | (Japan) |
| 3 | 1 |
- Date: 28 August 2022
- Venue: Estadio Nacional de Costa Rica, San José
- Referee: Emikar Calderas (Venezuela)
- Attendance: 29,891
- Weather: Rain; 18 °C (64 °F); 98% humidity

The 2022 FIFA U-20 Women's World Cup final was the final match of the 2022 FIFA U-20 Women's World Cup in Costa Rica. The match was played at the Estadio Nacional de Costa Rica, San José on 28 August 2022 and was contested by Spain and Japan. For the first time ever, the FIFA U-20 Women's World Cup Final was a repeat of the previous edition's Final, as Japan had beaten Spain to win their first title on 2018 by a 3–1 scoreline. However, things were different on 2022. Spain won the 2022 Final after defeating Japan by a 3–1 win after 90 minutes of action, now with the 3–1 score being on their favour, bouncing back from the previous edition. It was Spain's first-ever FIFA U-20 Women's World Cup title, with them now being only the second European national team to win the tournament within all the 10 editions of the tournament.

== Road to the final ==
Spain
Round
Japan
Opponent
Result
Group stage
Opponent
Result
Brazil
0–0
Match 1
Netherlands
1–0
Costa Rica
5–0
Match 2
Ghana
2–0
Australia
3–0
Match 3
United States
3–1
Group A winners

| Pos | Team | Pld | Pts |
|---|---|---|---|
| 1 | Spain | 3 | 7 |
| 2 | Brazil | 3 | 7 |
| 3 | Australia | 3 | 3 |
| 4 | Costa Rica (H) | 3 | 0 |

Source: FIFA
(H) Hosts
Final standings
Group D winners

| Pos | Team | Pld | Pts |
|---|---|---|---|
| 1 | Japan | 3 | 9 |
| 2 | Netherlands | 3 | 6 |
| 3 | United States | 3 | 3 |
| 4 | Ghana | 3 | 0 |

Source: FIFA
Opponent
Result
Knockout stage
Opponent
Result
Mexico
1–0
Quarter-finals
France
3–3 (aet) (5–3 pen.)
Netherlands
2–1
Semi-finals
Brazil
2–1

== Match ==
=== Details ===
28 August 2022
20:00 UTC-6

| Spain | 3–1 | Japan |
|---|---|---|
| Gabarro 12'; Paralluelo 22', 27' (pen.) | Report | Amano 47' |

Estadio Nacional de Costa Rica, San José
Attendance: 29,891
Referee: Emikar Calderas (Venezuela)

| Spain | Japan |

| GK | 13 | Txell Font | (yellow card) 74' |
| RB | 12 | Esther Laborde | | (substituted off) 62' |
| CB | 3 | Ana Tejada (c) |
| CB | 5 | Andrea Medina |
| LB | 19 | Ane Elexpuru |
| DM | 6 | Ariadna Mingueza | | (substituted off) 75' |
| CM | 10 | Júlia Bartel |
| CM | 8 | Silvia Lloris |
| AM | 9 | Inma Gabarro | | (substituted off) 75' |
| CF | 20 | Asun Martínez | | (substituted off) 46' |
| CF | 11 | Salma Paralluelo | | (substituted off) 78' |
Substitutions:
| FW | 14 | Fiamma Benítez | | (substituted in) 46' |
| FW | 17 | Mirari Uria | | (substituted in) 62' |
| DF | 4 | Sonia Majarín | | (substituted in) 75' |
| DF | 16 | Maite Zubieta | | (substituted in) 75' |
| MF | 18 | Izarne Sarasola | | (substituted in) 78' |
Coach:
Pedro López

| GK | 18 | Shu Ohba |
| CB | 3 | Ibuki Nagae | | (substituted off) 46' |
| CB | 4 | Rion Ishikawa | (yellow card) 27' |
| CB | 12 | Haruna Tabata |
| RM | 7 | Mihoshi Sugisawa (c) |
| CM | 8 | Kokona Iwasaki | | (substituted off) 46' |
| CM | 6 | Aemu Oyama | | (substituted off) 88' |
| LM | 16 | Shiori Koyama |
| RF | 10 | Aoba Fujino |
| CF | 11 | Maika Hamano |
| LF | 9 | Yuzuki Yamamoto | | (substituted off) 83' |
Substitutions:
| MF | 14 | Manaka Matsukubo | | (substituted in) 46' |
| MF | 15 | Suzu Amano | | (substituted in) 46' |
| FW | 17 | Maya Hijikata | | (substituted in) 83' |
| FW | 13 | Mei Shimada | | (substituted in) 88' |
Coach:
Futoshi Ikeda

Assistant referees:
Migdalia Rodriguez (Venezuela)
Mary Blanco (Colombia)
Fourth official:
Cheryl Foster (Wales)
Video assistant referee:
Esther Staubli (Switzerland)
Assistant video assistant referees:
Kate Jacewicz (Australia)
Fatiha Jermoumi (Morocco)

Match rules:

- 90 minutes.
- 30 minutes of extra time if necessary.
- Penalty shoot-out if scores still level.
- Ten named eligible substitutes.
- Maximum of five substitutions, with a sixth allowed in extra time.
