= Ane Elexpuru =

Spanish footballer

Personal information
- Full name: Ane Elexpuru Añorga
- Date of birth: 2 May 2003 (age 23)
- Place of birth: Bilbao, Spain
- Height: 1.60 m (5 ft 3 in)
- Positions: Right back; right winger

Team information
- Current team: Athletic Club
- Number: 20

Youth career
- 2013–2017: Loiola Indautxu
- 2017–2018: Bizkerre

Senior career*
Years	Team	Apps	(Gls)
2018–2023	Athletic Club B	139	(24)
2022–	Athletic Club	69	(2)

International career^{‡}
2019	Spain U17	4	(0)
2021–2022	Spain U19	11	(2)
2022	Spain U20	6	(1)
2022–	Spain U23	9	(1)
Medal record
Women's football
Representing Spain
FIFA U-20 Women's World Cup
Winner	2022 Costa Rica
UEFA Women's Under-19 Championship
Winner	2022 Czech Republic
- * Club domestic league appearances and goals as of 25 July 2025 ‡ National team caps and goals as of 22 December 2023

Ane Elexpuru Añorga (Note: In this Spanish name, the first or paternal surname is Elexpuru and the second or maternal family name is Añorga.) (born 2 May 2003) is a Spanish footballer who plays as a right back or right winger for Athletic Club.

== Club career ==
Elexpuru joined Athletic Club's academy from Bizkerre in 2018, aged 15. She was immediately assigned to the B-team and was a regular in the side for the next five seasons, amassing well over 100 appearances in the second tier (her expected progression to the main squad was delayed mainly due to the good form of Ane Azkona and Oihane Hernández in the right-sided positions). She also continued to pursue her education, attending the University of the Basque Country to study teaching.

She made her professional debut in the Liga F as a starter against Real Madrid Femenino in October 2022, aged 19; she was mainly used as a substitute in the 2022–23 Liga F campaign, continuing to feature for the reserves in around half of their fixtures. Ahead of the 2023–24 Liga F, with Oihane having moved on to Real Madrid, Elexpuru was promoted officially to the main squad.

== International career ==
Elexpuru made her debut for the Spain under-17 team in 2019 against Slovakia, one of four appearances that year. After a hiatus due to restrictions of the COVID-19 pandemic, she was first capped at under-19 level in October 2021. She became a regular in the team and was a member of the squads which won the 2022 UEFA Women's Under-19 Championship in the Czech Republic (scoring in a win over the hosts then in the final against Norway) followed by the 2022 FIFA U-20 Women's World Cup in Costa Rica (alongside clubmates Clara Pinedo and Maite Zubieta).

== Honours ==
Spain U19

- UEFA Women's Under-19 Championship: 2022

Spain U20

- FIFA U-20 Women's World Cup: 2022
