= Clara Pinedo =

Spanish footballer (born 2003)

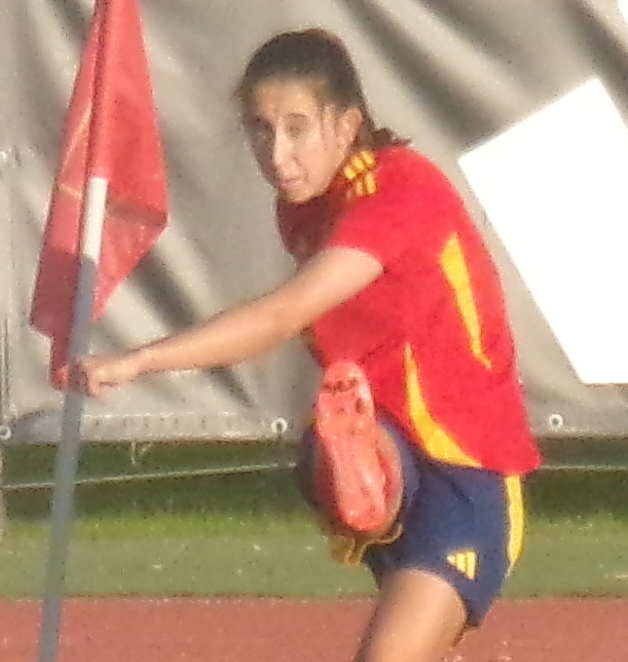
- Pinedo playing for Spain U23, 2024

Personal information
- Full name: Clara Pinedo Castresana
- Date of birth: 9 September 2003 (age 23)
- Place of birth: Bilbao, Spain
- Height: 1.65 m (5 ft 5 in)
- Position: Midfielder

Team information
- Current team: Athletic Club
- Number: 15

Youth career
- 2016–2019: Bizkerre

Senior career*
Years	Team	Apps	(Gls)
2019–2022	Athletic Club B	71	(16)
2020–	Athletic Club	88	(16)

International career^{‡}
2021–2022	Spain U19	6	(2)
2022–	Spain U20	3	(1)
2023–	Spain U23	6	(1)
Medal record
Women's football
Representing Spain
FIFA U-20 Women's World Cup
Winner	2022 Costa Rica
UEFA Women's Under-19 Championship
Winner	2022 Czech Republic
- * Club domestic league appearances and goals as of 25 July 2025 ‡ National team caps and goals as of 02:35, 23 December 2023 (UTC)

Clara Pinedo Castresana (born 9 September 2003) is a Spanish footballer who plays as a midfielder for Athletic Club.

== Club career ==
A youth player with Bizkerre, Pinedo started her professional career at Athletic Club B, playing her first senior match in the Spanish second tier a few days after her 16th birthday. Having established herself in the first team squad, in February 2023 she agreed a new contract with Athletic running to 2026.

== International career ==
Pinedo has also played for the Spain under-19 team, scoring a goal in a 4–0 win against Portugal on 22 October 2021, and was part of the squads which won the 2022 UEFA Women's Under-19 Championship in the Czech Republic followed by the 2022 FIFA U-20 Women's World Cup in Costa Rica (alongside clubmates Ane Elexpuru and Maite Zubieta).

== Honours ==
Spain U19

- UEFA Women's Under-19 Championship: 2022

Spain U20

- FIFA U-20 Women's World Cup: 2022
