= Txell Font =

Spanish footballer (born 2004)

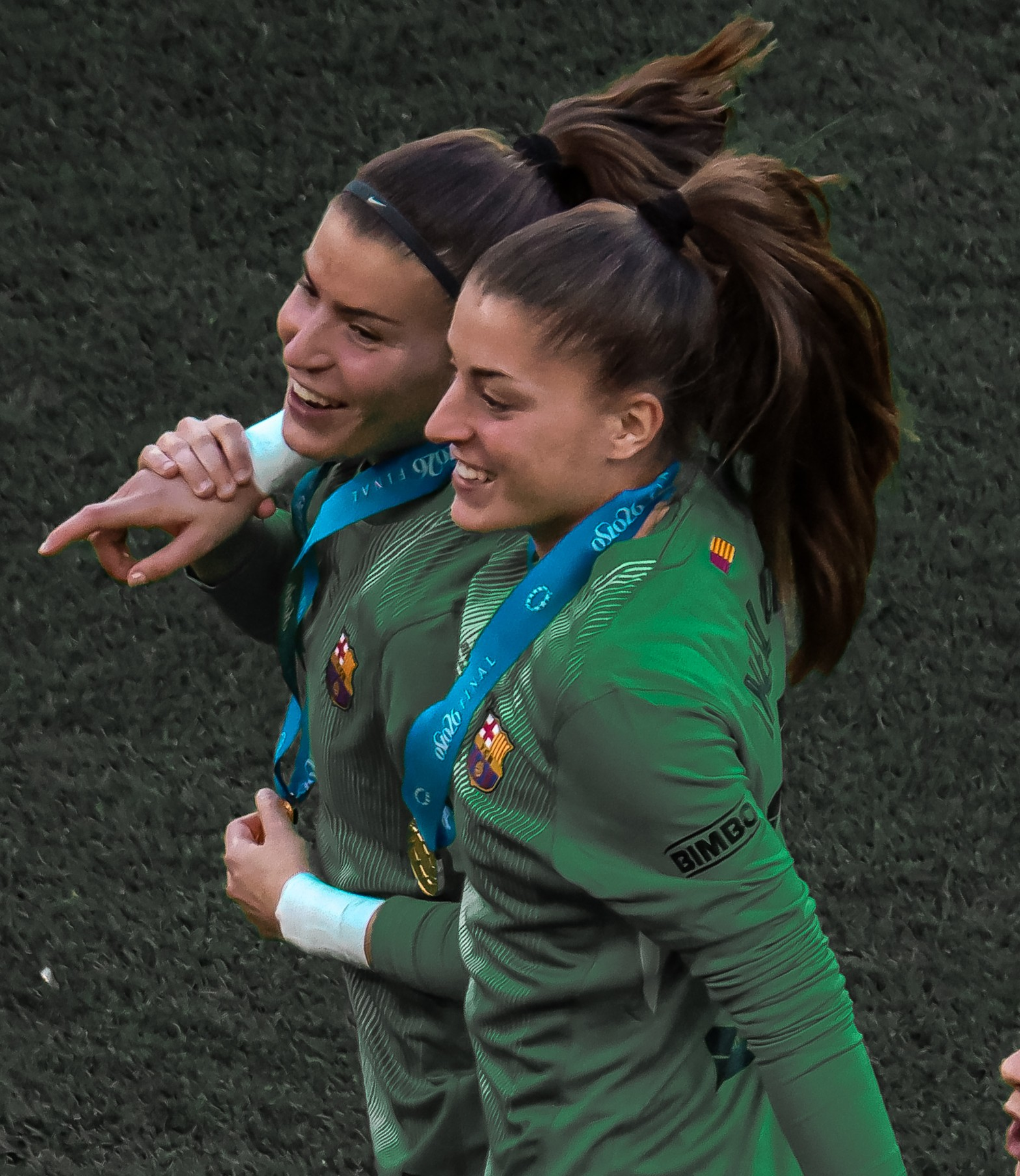
- Txell Font (foreground) with her sister Gemma for Barcelona in 2026

Personal information
- Full name: Meritxell Font Oliveras
- Date of birth: 10 December 2004 (age 21)
- Height: 1.70 m (5 ft 7 in)
- Position: Goalkeeper

Team information
- Current team: Badalona

Youth career
- UE Centelles
- 2016–2020: Barcelona

Senior career*
| Years | Team | Apps | (Gls) |
| 2020–2026 | Barcelona Femení B | 67 | (0) |
| 2026 | Barcelona Femení | 1 | (0) |
| 2026– | Badalona | 0 | (0) |

International career^{‡}
| 2020 | Spain U16 | 1 | (0) |
| 2022–2023 | Spain U19 | 15 | (0) |
| 2022 | Spain U20 | 4 | (0) |
- * Club domestic league appearances and goals ‡ National team caps and goals as of 30 July 2023

Meritxell "Txell" Font Oliveras (Catalan pronunciation: [(məɾi)ˈtʃeʎ ˈfon uliˈβeɾəs]; born 10 December 2004) is a Spanish professional footballer who plays as a goalkeeper for Liga F club Badalona. She helped lead Spain to victory at the 2022 FIFA U-20 Women's World Cup, winning the tournament's Golden Glove.

== Club career ==
Font was one of the first nine girls to train at La Masia, Barcelona's youth academy. She was the starting goalkeeper for FC Barcelona B as they won the Primera Federación in the 2022–23 season. She was injured the following season after an ACL tear. On 31 May 2026, she made her first-team debut in the Liga F season finale and kept a clean sheet in a 4–0 victory over Madrid CFF.

On 15 July 2026, Font was announced at Liga F club Badalona.

== International career ==
At the age of 17, Font helped Spain's U19 team win the 2022 UEFA U-19 Championship, allowing just two goals in four matches.

Later in the year, Font made the Spain U20 roster for the 2022 FIFA U-20 World Cup as the second-choice goalkeeper to Adriana Nanclares following an injury to Elene Lete. In the last game of the group stage against Australia, Nanclares had to be substituted due to injury and Font was called on to play the rest of the tournament. She started all three knockout rounds, ending with a 3–1 victory over Japan in the final. She was awarded the Golden Glove as the best goalkeeper in the tournament.

The following year, Font led Spain U19 to defend their title at the 2023 UEFA U-19 Championship, allowing no goals over five matches. In the semifinals against the Netherlands, she saved a penalty in the 87th minute to preserve the lead in a 1–0 victory. She held Germany to a 0–0 draw in the final, winning on penalties. She was named in the team of the tournament.

== Personal life ==
Font is the younger sister of Gemma Font, who plays as a goalkeeper for Barcelona's first team.

== Honours ==
Barcelona

- Liga F: 2025–26
- Copa de la Reina: 2025–26
- UEFA Women's Champions League: 2025–26
