= Ariadna Mingueza =

Spanish footballer

Personal information
- Full name: Ariadna Mingueza García
- Date of birth: 22 March 2003 (age 23)
- Place of birth: Santa Perpètua de Mogoda, Spain
- Height: 1.63 m (5 ft 4 in)
- Position: Defensive midfielder

Team information
- Current team: Granada
- Number: 5

Youth career
- 2012–2014: UCF Santa Perpètua
- 2014–2015: UE Centelles
- 2015–2019: Barcelona

Senior career*
Years	Team	Apps	(Gls)
2019–2023	Barcelona B	117	(16)
2021–2023	Barcelona	2	(0)
2023–	Granada	11	(1)

International career^{‡}
2018–2019	Spain U16	6	(0)
2019	Spain U17	4	(0)
2021–2022	Spain U19	10	(1)
2022	Spain U20	6	(1)
2022–	Spain U23	9	(0)
Medal record
Women's football
Representing Spain
FIFA U-20 Women's World Cup
Winner	2022 Costa Rica
UEFA Women's Under-19 Championship
Winner	2022 Czech Republic
- * Club domestic league appearances and goals as of 04:29, 23 December 2023 (UTC) ‡ National team caps and goals as of 04:29, 23 December 2023 (UTC)

Ariadna Mingueza García (born 22 March 2003) is a Spanish footballer who plays as a defensive midfielder for Liga F club Granada. She began her career at FC Barcelona B.

== Club career ==
Mingueza started out as a footballer by playing for her hometown club, UCF Santa Perpetua, when she was eight years old. After two seasons, she joined Unió Deportiva Centelles, and during her first and only season for that club her performance attracted the attention of youth scouts from Barcelona who signed her for their U-14 team (Infantil Alevín). From 2015 to 2021, Mingueza progressed through the different levels of the club's youth system until 6 March 2021 when she made her debut for the first team in a Primera División match against Santa Teresa, replacing Jenni Hermoso in the 80th minute.

== International career ==
Mingueza was first invited to train with Spain U-16 by Toña Is on 2 January 2018. She then became a regular name on the call-ups as well as later on U-17 national team which was also helmed by Is. At the 2019 UEFA Under-17 Championship Mingueza was part of the Spain squad that reached the semi-final, but they were defeated by the Netherlands and failed to reach the final for the first time since 2013.

Mingueza's first game for the U-19 national team came during 2022 UEFA Championship qualification against Slovakia. She played the game in its entirety as the captain of Spain After five wins and a draw throughout two rounds with Mingueza playing in every game (four times in the starting line-up), Spain managed to qualify for the final tournament. She scored her first national youth team goal in a 6–0 victory against Portugal.

== Personal life ==
Mingueza's older brother Óscar was also a Barcelona player, having joined La Masia in 2007; he currently plays for Crystal Palace. Her father, Juan Carlos Mingueza, is the current mayor of Santa Perpètua de Mogoda since 2026, representing Santa Perpètua en Comú.

== Honours ==
Spain U19

- UEFA Women's Under-19 Championship: 2022

Spain U20

- FIFA U-20 Women's World Cup: 2022
