= Mirari Uria =

Spanish footballer (born 2003)

Personal information
- Full name: Mirari Uria Gabilondo
- Date of birth: 1 January 2003
- Place of birth: Azpeitia, Spain
- Height: 1.69 m (5 ft 7 in)
- Position: Forward

Team information
- Current team: Real Sociedad
- Number: 18

Youth career
- 2016–2018: Lagun Onak

Senior career*
Years	Team	Apps	(Gls)
2018–2021	Real Sociedad B		
2019–	Real Sociedad	74	(8)

International career^{‡}
2021–2022	Spain U19	11	(7)
2022	Spain U20	5	(0)
2022–	Spain U23	7	(0)
Medal record
Women's football
Representing Spain
FIFA U-20 Women's World Cup
Winner	2022 Costa Rica
UEFA Women's Under-19 Championship
Winner	2022 Czech Republic
- * Club domestic league appearances and goals as of 10:47, 17 December 2023 (UTC) ‡ National team caps and goals as of 10:47, 17 December 2023 (UTC)

Mirari Uria Gabilondo (born 1 January 2003) is a Spanish footballer who plays as a forward for Real Sociedad.

== Career ==
Uria started her club career at Lagun Onak.

She was a member of the Spain squads which won the 2022 UEFA Women's Under-19 Championship in the Czech Republic (scoring the only goal in the semi-final win over Sweden) followed by the 2022 FIFA U-20 Women's World Cup in Costa Rica (appearing in the final as a substitute).

== Honours ==
Spain U19

- UEFA Women's Under-19 Championship: 2022

Spain U20

- FIFA U-20 Women's World Cup: 2022
