= Carmen Álvarez =

Spanish footballer (born 2003)

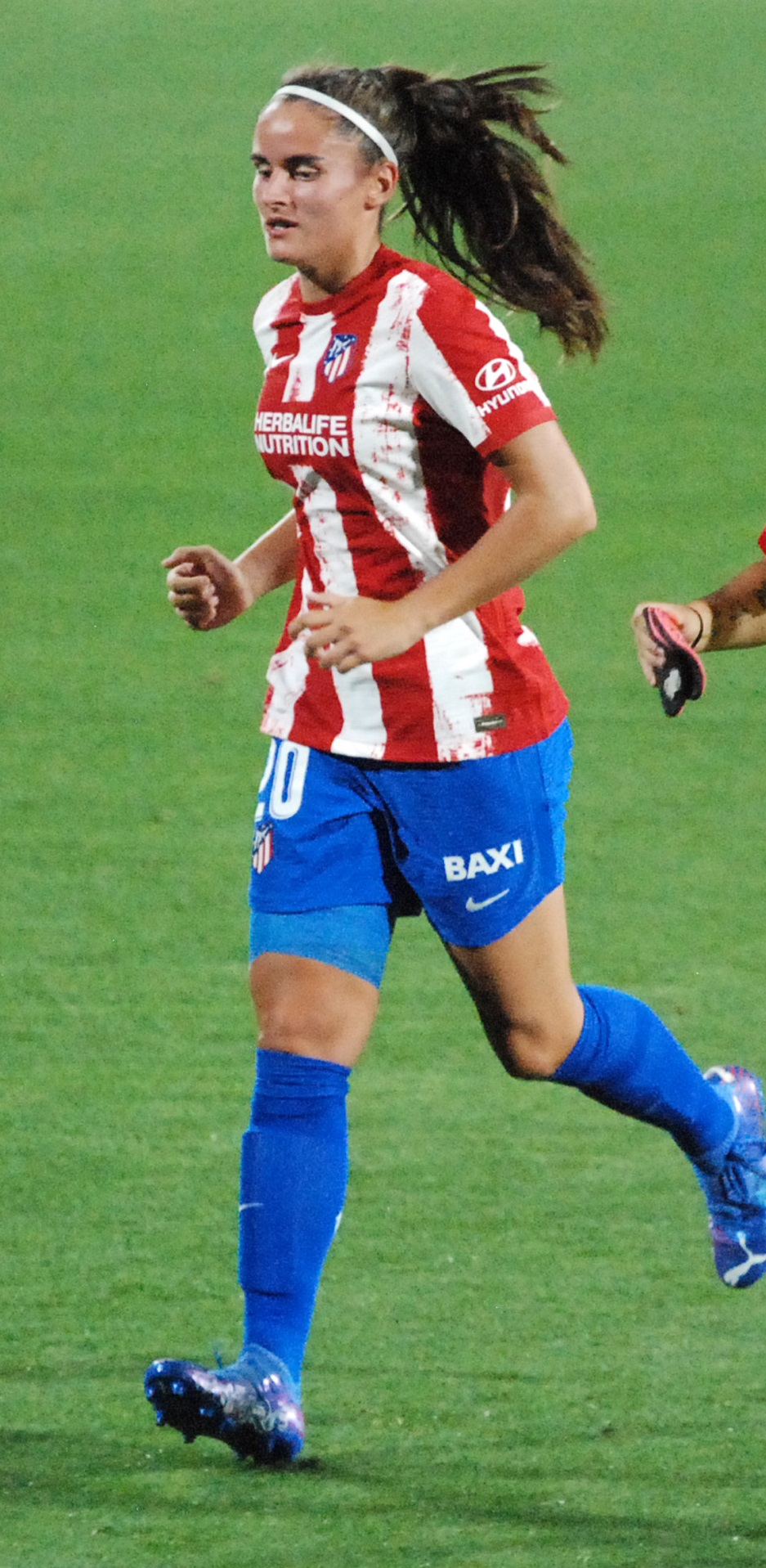

Personal information
- Full name: Carmen Álvarez Sánchez
- Date of birth: 24 February 2003 (age 23)
- Place of birth: Salamanca, Spain
- Height: 1.77 m (5 ft 10 in)
- Position: Forward

Team information
- Current team: Eibar
- Number: 16

Senior career*
Years	Team	Apps	(Gls)
2017–2020	Salamanca FF		
2020–2021	Atlético Madrid B	16	(6)
2020–2022	Atlético Madrid	9	(1)
2022	Eibar	10	(5)
2022–2025	Real Betis	39	(1)
2025–	Eibar		

International career
2022	Spain U19	8	(5)
2022	Spain U20	2	(0)
Medal record
Women's football
Representing Spain
FIFA U-20 Women's World Cup
Winner	2022 Costa Rica
UEFA Women's Under-19 Championship
Winner	2022 Czech Republic
- * Club domestic league appearances and goals as of 16:53, 24 November 2024 (UTC)

Carmen Álvarez Sánchez (born 24 February 2003) is a Spanish footballer who plays as a forward for SD Eibar.

== Club career ==
Álvarez started her career at Salamanca FF.

== Honours ==
Spain U19

- UEFA Women's Under-19 Championship: 2022

Spain U20

- FIFA U-20 Women's World Cup: 2022
