= Izarne Sarasola =

Spanish footballer (born 2002)

Personal information
- Full name: Izarne Sarasola Beain
- Date of birth: 17 February 2002 (age 24)
- Place of birth: Ibarra, Spain
- Height: 1.58 m (5 ft 2 in)
- Position: Midfielder

Team information
- Current team: FC Nantes

Youth career
- 2014–2017: Tolosa

Senior career*
Years	Team	Apps	(Gls)
2017–2018	Tolosa		
2018–2025	Real Sociedad	66	(1)
2025–	Nantes	0	(0)

International career^{‡}
2022	Spain U20	5	(0)
Medal record
Women's football
Representing Spain
FIFA U-20 Women's World Cup
Winner	2022 Costa Rica
- * Club domestic league appearances and goals as of 10:37, 17 December 2023 (UTC) ‡ National team caps and goals as of 10:37, 17 December 2023 (UTC)

Izarne Sarasola Beain (born 17 February 2002) is a Spanish footballer who plays as a midfielder for Première Ligue side FC Nantes.

== Career ==
Sarasola started her club career at Tolosa. She then played for Real Sociedad Femenino for seven seasons. On 18 July 2025 she joined French side Nantes.

== International career ==
She was a member of the Spain U20 squad which won the 2022 FIFA U-20 Women's World Cup in Costa Rica, appearing in the final as a substitute.

== Honours ==
Spain U20

- FIFA U-20 Women's World Cup: 2022
