= Andrea Medina =

Spanish footballer (born 2004)

- Medina in 2026

Personal information
- Full name: Andrea Medina Martín
- Date of birth: 11 May 2004 (age 22)
- Place of birth: Seville, Spain
- Height: 1.65 m (5 ft 5 in)
- Positions: Left-back; centre-back

Team information
- Current team: Manchester United
- Number: 6

Youth career
- 2017–2018: Camas
- 2018–2019: Real Betis

Senior career*
Years	Team	Apps	(Gls)
2019–2022	Real Betis	55	(3)
2022–2026	Atlético Madrid	102	(1)
2026–	Manchester United	10	(2)

International career^{‡}
2020	Spain U16	1	(0)
2021–2023	Spain U19	21	(2)
2022	Spain U20	6	(1)
2023–2026	Spain U23	8	(0)
2026–	Spain	2	(0)
Medal record
Women's football
Representing Spain
FIFA U-20 Women's World Cup
Winner	2022 Costa Rica
UEFA Women's Under-19 Championship
Winner	2022 Czech Republic
Winner	2023 Belgium
- * Club domestic league appearances and goals as of 19:25, 14 November 2026 (UTC) ‡ National team caps and goals as of 16:40, 18 October 2026 (UTC)

Andrea Medina Martín (born 11 May 2004) is a Spanish professional footballer who plays as a left back for Women's Super League club Manchester United and the Spanish national team. She made her debut in Liga F then known as Primera División with Real Betis at the age of 15. She is a World Cup winner with the Spanish under-20 team and a two-time European champion with the Spanish under-19 team.

== Club career ==
=== Youth career ===
Andrea Medina started playing football for the team in her hometown of Sanlúcar la Mayor. She subsequently progressed through the youth academies of Sevilla FC and Camas CF, where she won the Andalusian Championship with the Seville regional team.

In 2018, María Pry requested her signing to join the reserve team of Real Betis. In April 2019, Medina became the Spanish Under-15 Champion with the Andalusian regional team.

=== Real Betis (2020–2022) ===
Medina made her debut in Primera Division on 25 January 2020 against Real Sociedad, at just 15 years of age. She was included in the matchday squad as a replacement for the suspended Paula Perea and subsequently came on as a substitute for Marta Perarnau.

In April 2020, after impressing with the reserve team in Group IV of the Primera Nacional, she signed her first professional contract.

Despite her young age, Medina became part of Real Betis first team during the 2020–21 season and began playing regularly. She made 28 appearances, while Betis finished 12th in the league.

On 28 March 2021, she scored her first professional goal against Santa Teresa.

During the following season, Real Betis finished ninth in the league. Medina made 26 appearances, missing several matches because of a knee sprain, and scored two goals.

=== Atlético de Madrid (2022–2026) ===
==== 2022–23 season ====
In 2022, Medina signed for Atlético de Madrid. Although her contract with Real Betis had expired, Atlético had to negotiate a transfer fee because Medina was included on the compensation list. As part of the agreement, Carmen Álvarez was included in the deal and subsequently signed for Real Betis. When announcing her signing, Atlético de Madrid described her as a left-back with outstanding physical attributes and significant attacking potential.

She made her debut for Atlético on 17 September 2022 in their opening league match against Sevilla. Atlético won 3–1, with Medina replacing Hanna Lundkvist in the 70th minute.

The International Federation of Football History and Statistics selected her for its 2022 Women's Under-20 Team of the Year.

In the Copa de la Reina, Atlético progressed comfortably to the final, where they faced Real Madrid at the Estadio de Butarque in Leganés. Medina started the match. Atlético eventually won the trophy on penalties after recovering from a 2–0 deficit during stoppage time.

==== 2023–24 season ====
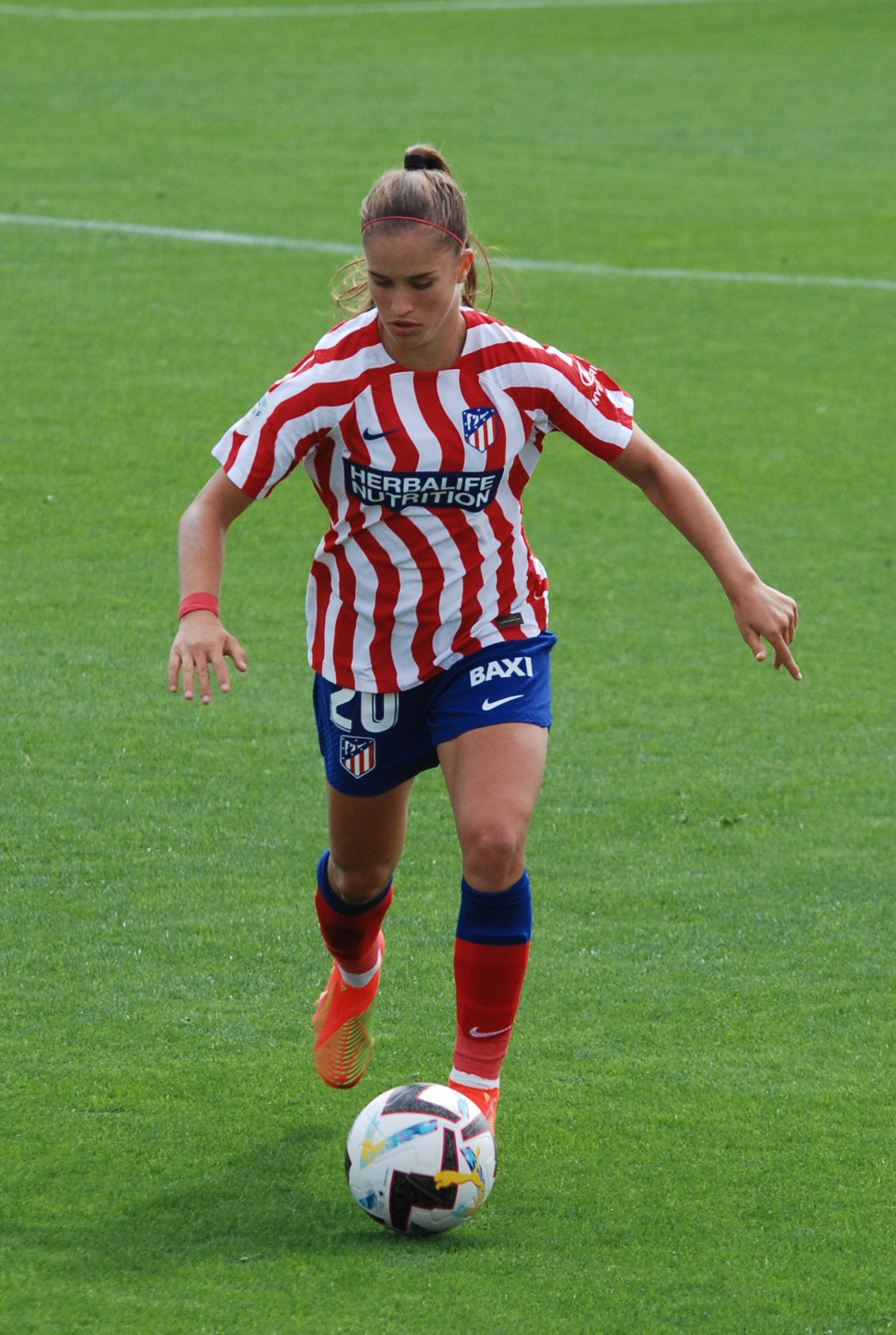
Medina playing for Atlético de Madrid in 2023.

Medina continued as a regular starter during the 2023–24 season.

In January, Atlético were eliminated in the Supercopa de España semi-finals. During February, they faced several important league opponents but failed to achieve positive results, falling further behind the leading teams. Following their elimination from the Copa de la Reina in the semi-finals and disappointing league performances, head coach Manolo Cano was dismissed and replaced by the reserve team's coach, Arturo Ruiz.

Under the new coach, Atlético secured several consecutive victories and ultimately achieved their objective of qualifying for the UEFA Women's Champions League by finishing third in the league.

==== 2024–25 season ====
Under head coach Víctor Martín, Atlético de Madrid qualified for the Champions League on the final matchday and reached the Copa de la Reina final.

==== 2025–26 season ====
Medina started the 2025–26 season in excellent form, earning the Atlético de Madrid Player of the Month award for October. Her performances also brought her into consideration for a call-up to Spain.

She was once again named Atlético's Player of the Month in February.

In May, it was announced that she would leave the club at the end of the season. She was subsequently called up to Spain's senior national team.

=== Manchester United (2026–present) ===
On 1 July 2026, She joined Manchester United, competing in the Women's Super League. She signed a contract with the club until 2029.

== International career ==
=== Youth ===
Andrea Medina began her international career with Spain's Under-16 national team in February 2020, scoring her first international goal against Denmark.

she made her debut for the Under-19 team in September 2021. She subsequently represented Spain in the 2022 UEFA Women's Under-19 Championship, where she helped the team win the European title. Later that year, she was part of Spain's squad for the FIFA U-20 Women's World Cup in Costa Rica. She played an important role throughout the tournament, providing an assist in the final as Spain defeated Japan 3–1 to become world champions.

In 2023, Medina represented Spain in the 2023 UEFA Women's Under-19 Championship in Belgium, starting all five matches. Spain defeated Germany in the final after a penalty shootout, allowing Medina to claim her second consecutive European Under-19 Championship title. She was also named in the Team of the Tournament.

On 21 September 2023, she made her debut for Spain women's national under-23 football team in a friendly against Portugal.

=== Senior ===
Medina made her senior international debut for Spain on 10 October 2026, coming on as a second-half substitute in a 2–0 friendly win against the United States.

== Career statistics ==
=== Club ===
As of match played 14 November 2026

Appearances and goals by club, season and competition
Club	Season	League			National cup (Note: Includes the Copa de la Reina and FA Cup)		League cup (Note: Includes the Supercopa de España and FA Women's League Cup)		Continental (Note: Includes the UEFA Champions League)		Total	
Club	Season	Division	Apps	Goals	Apps	Goals	Apps	Goals	Apps	Goals	Apps	Goals
Real Betis	2019–20	Primera División	1	0	—		—		—		1	0
Real Betis	2020–21	Primera División	28	1	—		—		—		28	1
Real Betis	2021–22	Primera División	26	2	2	0	—		—		28	2
Real Betis	Total		55	3	2	0	—		—		57	3
Atlético Madrid	2022–23	Liga F	24	0	4	0	1	0	—		29	0
Atlético Madrid	2023–24	Liga F	25	0	1	0	1	0	—		27	0
Atlético Madrid	2024–25	Liga F	26	0	4	0	1	0	1	0	32	0
Atlético Madrid	2025–26	Liga F	29	2	5	0	1	0	9	1	44	3
Atlético Madrid	Total		104	2	14	0	4	0	10	1	132	3
Manchester United	2026–27	WSL	10	2	0	0	2	0	—		12	2
Career total			169	7	16	0	6	0	10	1	201	8

=== International ===
As of match played 13 October 2026

Appearances and goals by national team and year
National team	Year	Apps	Goals
Spain	2026	2	0
Total		2	0

== Honours ==
Atlético Madrid

- Copa de la Reina : 2022-23, runner-up 2024-25, 2025-26

Spain U19

- UEFA Women's Under-19 Championship: 2022, 2023

Spain U20

- FIFA U-20 Women's World Cup: 2022

Individual

- IFFHS The World Youth (U20) Team: 2022, 2023
- UEFA Women's Under-19 Championship Team of the Tournament: 2023
- Atlético de Madrid Player of the Month: October 2025, February 2026
