= Kára Djurhuus =

Faroese footballer (born 1997)

Personal information
- Date of birth: 16 January 1997 (age 29)
- Position: Midfielder

Team information
- Current team: HB

Senior career*
Years	Team	Apps	(Gls)
2012	EB/Streymur	13	(2)
2013–2019	EBS/Skála	96	(20)
2020	HB	20	(7)
2021	Pomigliano	4	(0)
2021–	HB	6	(2)

International career^{‡}
2012–2013	Faroe Islands U17	8	(0)
2014–2015	Faroe Islands U19	12	(1)
2020–	Faroe Islands	4	(0)
- * Club domestic league appearances and goals as of 17 October 2020. ‡ National team caps and goals as of 1 December 2020.

Kára Djurhuus (born 16 January 1997) is a Faroese footballer who plays as a midfielder for HB and the Faroe Islands women's national team.

== Club career ==
Djurhuus has played for EB/Streymur, EBS/Skála, HB in the Faroe Islands and for Pomigliano in Italy.

== International career ==
Djurhuus made her senior debut for the Faroe Islands on 18 September 2020. She capped during the UEFA Women's Euro 2022 qualifying.
