= Della Peruta =

Della Peruta is an Italian surname. Notable people with the name include:

- Franco Della Peruta (1924–2012), Italian historian
- Talia DellaPeruta (born 2002), American soccer player
- Tori DellaPeruta (born 2004), Italian-American soccer player
