= Czech Republic women's national under-19 football team =

Czech Republic Women's U-19
- Association: Fotbalová asociace České republiky (FAČR)
- Confederation: UEFA (Europe)
- Head coach: Daniel Šmejkal
- Captain: Lucie Jelínková
- FIFA code: CZE
First colours	Second colours

First international
- Czech Republic 3–1 Slovakia (Brumov, Czech Republic; 8 September 1997)

Biggest win
- Czech Republic 12–0 Andorra (Czech Republic; 8 October 2022)

Biggest defeat
- Czech Republic 0–10 Spain (Falkirk, Scotland; 8 April 2025)

UEFA Women's Under-19 Championship
- Appearances: 2 (first in 2022)
- Best result: Group stage (2022, 2023)

The Czech Republic women's national under-19 football team is the national under-19 football team of Czech Republic and is governed by the Football Association of the Czech Republic (FAČR).

== Competitive record ==
=== FIFA U-20 Women's World Cup ===
The team has never qualified for the FIFA U-20 Women's World Cup.

Year	Result	Matches	Wins	Draws*	Losses	GF	GA
(Chile) 2008	Did not qualify						
(Germany) 2010	Did not qualify						
(Japan) 2012	Did not qualify						
(Canada) 2014	Did not qualify						
(Papua New Guinea) 2016	Did not qualify						
(France) 2018	Did not qualify						
(Costa Rica) 2022	Did not qualify						
(Colombia) 2024	Did not qualify						
(Poland) 2026	Did not qualify						
Total	0/9	0	0	0	0	0	0

=== UEFA Women's Under-19 Championship ===
Year	Result	MP	W	D	L	GF	GA
1998 to 2019	Did not qualify						
(Georgia (country)) ~~2020~~	Cancelled						
(Belarus) ~~2021~~	Cancelled						
(Czech Republic) 2022	Group stage	3	0	0	3	0	12
(Belgium) 2023	Group stage	3	0	0	3	0	10
(Lithuania) 2024	Did not qualify						
(Poland) 2025	Did not qualify						
(Bosnia and Herzegovina) 2026	Did not qualify						
(Hungary) 2027	TBD						
Total	2/26	6	0	0	6	0	22

== Players ==
=== Previous squads ===
UEFA Women's Under-19 Championship

- 2022 UEFA Women's Under-19 Championship
- 2023 UEFA Women's Under-19 Championship
