= Maite Zubieta =

Spanish footballer (born 2004)

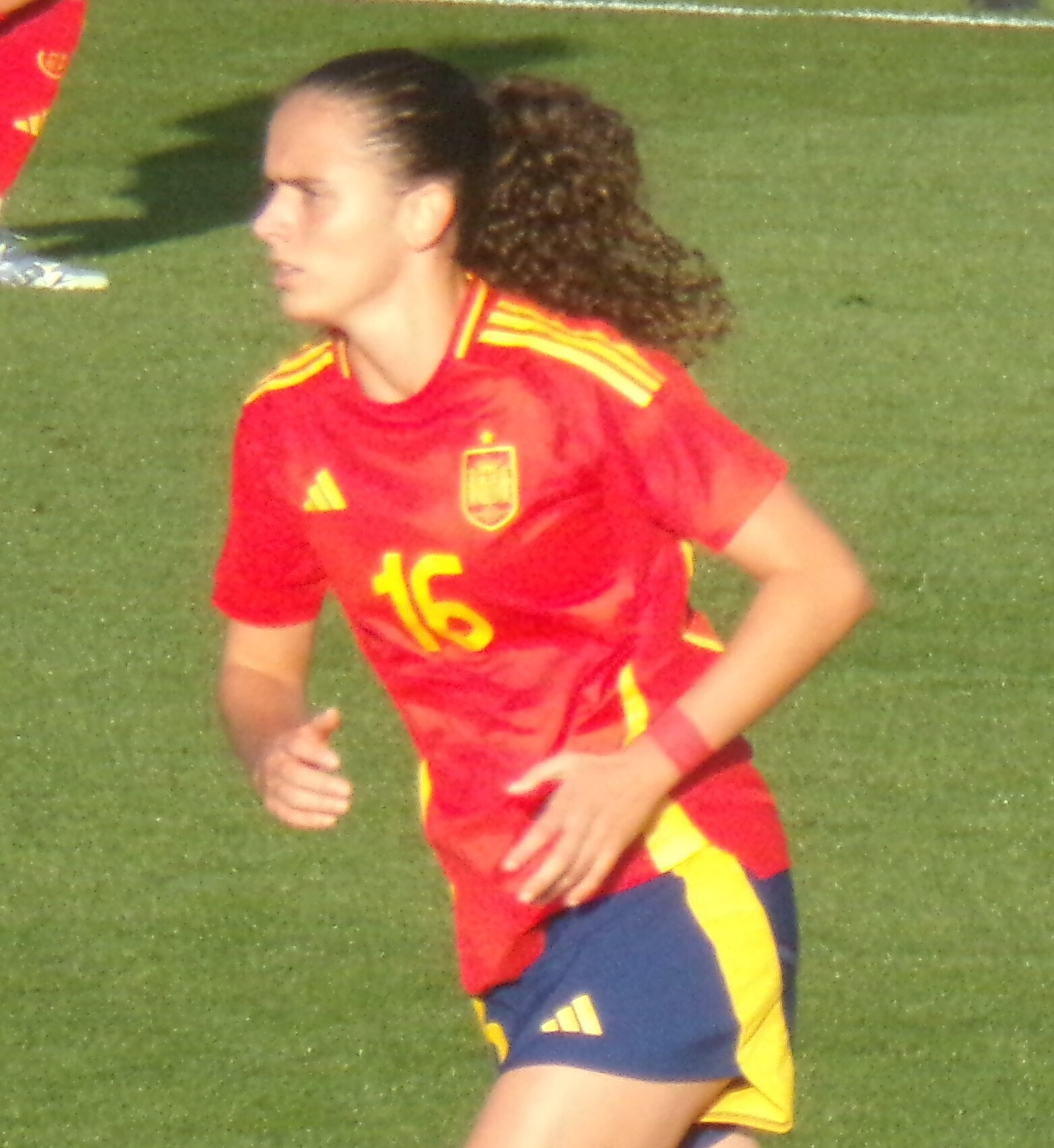
- Zubieta playing for Spain U23, 2024

Personal information
- Full name: Maite Zubieta Aranbarri
- Date of birth: 28 May 2004 (age 22)
- Place of birth: Busturia, Spain
- Height: 1.73 m (5 ft 8 in)
- Positions: Midfielder; central defender

Team information
- Current team: Atlético Madrid
- Number: 6

Youth career
- 2018–2019: Athletic Club

Senior career*
Years	Team	Apps	(Gls)
2019–2020	Athletic Club C	10	(1)
2020–2023	Athletic Club B	59	(2)
2022–2026	Athletic Club	93	(3)
2026–	Atlético Madrid	0	(0)

International career^{‡}
2019	Spain U17	1	(0)
2020	Spain U16	1	(0)
2021–2023	Spain U19	17	(0)
2022–2024	Spain U20	11	(0)
2023–	Spain U23		
2024–2025	Spain	7	(0)
2022–	Basque Country	1	(0)
Medal record
Women's football
Representing Spain
UEFA Women's Championship
Runner-up	2025 Switzerland
FIFA U-20 Women's World Cup
Winner	2022 Costa Rica
UEFA Women's Under-19 Championship
Winner	2022 Czech Republic
Winner	2023 Belgium
- * Club domestic league appearances and goals as of 2 July 2026 ‡ National team caps and goals as of 24 July 2025

Maite Zubieta Aranbarri (Note: In this Spanish name, the first or paternal surname is Zubieta and the second or maternal family name is Aranbarri.) (born 28 May 2004) is a Spanish professional footballer who plays as a midfielder or central defender for Liga F club Atlético Madrid and the Spain national team.

== Club career ==
Zubieta joined Athletic Club's academy aged 14. After progressing through the ranks (one season in the 'cadet' youth team, half a season with the newly-formed C-team before being assigned to the B-team, two further seasons there), she made her professional debut as a late substitute in a Liga F fixture against Madrid CFF in December 2022, aged 18, and her first start six weeks later in a defeat away to Alhama CF. On the back of her performances she was officially promoted from the reserves to the senior squad in May 2023, and signed a contract extension running to 2025. During her debut campaign she was mostly used in her preferred role of central midfield, but at the beginning of the 2023–24 Liga F season she became a regular starter as a central defender, with Athletic enduring an ongoing injury crisis in that position.

On 3 July 2026, Zubieta signed a two-year contract with Atlético Madrid.

== International career ==
Having had minimal opportunities to play for younger age groups due to restrictions of the COVID-19 pandemic, Zubieta made her debut for Spain at under-19 level in October 2021 against Portugal. She became a regular in the team and was a member of the squads which won the 2022 Euros in the Czech Republic followed by the 2022 FIFA U-20 Women's World Cup in Costa Rica (alongside clubmates Ane Elexpuru and Clara Pinedo). She was still young enough to take part in the 2023 U-19 Euros in Belgium and again returned home with a gold medal, this time accompanied by fellow Athletic players Jone Amezaga and Sara Ortega.

Zubieta made her debut for the senior Spain team in November 2024, as a substitute in a 5–0 friendly victory over South Korea (club teammate Adriana Nanclares also gained a first cap, though as a starter). Her first competitive appearance was also from the bench, in a 1–0 2025 UEFA Women's Nations League defeat away to England in February 2025.

On 10 June 2025, Zubieta was called up to the Spain squad for the UEFA Women's Euro 2025.

She has also been selected for the unofficial Basque Country women's national team which plays only occasionally, making her first appearance in December 2022 against Chile.

== Honours ==
Spain U19

- UEFA Women's Under-19 Championship: 2022, 2023

Spain U20

- FIFA U-20 Women's World Cup: 2022

Spain

- UEFA Women's Championship runner-up: 2025
