= David Aznar =

Spanish football manager

Personal information
- Full name: David Aznar Chicharro
- Date of birth: 9 March 1980 (age 46)
- Place of birth: Talavera de la Reina, Spain

Team information
- Current team: Spain U19 (women) / Spain U20 (women) (head coach)

Managerial career
- Years: Team
- 2018–2020: CD Tacón
- 2020–2021: Real Madrid (women)
- 2023–2025: Athletic Club (women)
- 2025–: Spain U19 / Spain U20 (women)
Medal record
Women's football
Representing Spain (as manager)
UEFA Women's Under-19 Championship
Winner	2026 Bosnia and Herzegovina
FIFA U-20 Women's World Cup
Winner	2026 Poland

David Aznar Chicharro (born 9 March 1980) is a Spanish football manager who specializes in women's football. He currently serves as the head coach for the Spain women's national under-19 and under-20 football teams.

== Early life ==
Aznar is a native of Talavera de la Reina, Spain.

== Managerial career ==
=== CD Tacón and Real Madrid ===
Aznar took over as the head coach of CD Tacón in 2018. Under his guidance, the club achieved promotion to the top flight and transitioned into becoming the official women's football section of Real Madrid CF in July 2020.

During the 2020–21 season, he led Real Madrid Femenino to a historic second-place finish in Primera División, securing their first-ever qualification to the UEFA Women's Champions League. He was dismissed from his role by Real Madrid in November 2021 following a poor run of form in domestic competition and was replaced by Alberto Toril.

=== Athletic Club ===
On 29 June 2023, Aznar was appointed as the head coach of Athletic Club.

=== Spain youth national teams ===
In September 2025, following his departure from Athletic Club, Aznar joined the Royal Spanish Football Federation (RFEF) as the head coach of the Spain women's national under-19 and under-20 teams. In early 2026, he successfully guided the U19 national squad through the qualifying rounds to secure a spot in the European Championship.

== Personal life ==
Aznar has worked at Francisco de Vitoria University in Spain.

== Honours ==
Spain U19

- UEFA Women's Under-19 Championship: 2026

Spain U20

- FIFA U-20 Women's World Cup: 2026
