= Patricia Martínez =

Spanish footballer (born 1990)

Personal information
- Full name: Patricia Martínez Augusto
- Date of birth: 15 March 1990 (age 36)
- Place of birth: Ponferrada, Castile and León, Spain
- Height: 1.67 m (5 ft 6 in)
- Positions: Attacking midfielder; forward

Youth career
- 1998–2005: Fuentesnuevas

Senior career*
Years	Team	Apps	(Gls)
2005–2006	Barcelona B	?	(?)
2006–2008	→ Oviedo Moderno (loan)	44	(16)
2008–2011	Barcelona		
2011–2014	Ponferrada	66	(31)
2014	Sporting Huelva	11	(4)
2015–2018	ASPTT Albi	53	(6)
2026–	Terssac Albi FC		

International career
2007–2008	Spain U19	19	(24)
- * Club domestic league appearances and goals

Patricia Martínez Augusto (born 15 March 1990) is a Spanish footballer, who formerly played for ASPTT Albi in France's Division 1 Féminine.

== Personal life ==
Born in Ponferrada (El Bierzo). She started playing soccer with four years in the CD Fuentesnuevas (where her older brother played too) being the only girl. And at eight, Patri already found her first hurdle to achieving her dream: Castile and León Football Federation (FCyLF) only federated boys in this time, however she became the first girl in the province of León to record as a female footballer.

When she was thirteen years old, she was selected to represent the Castile and León women's autonomous under-17 football team and the following year she was the captain of this team.

At fifteen she transferred to FC Barcelona, where she played with the B-side one year later. With sixteen years old, she was loaned to Oviedo Moderno CF to gain experience, and becomes the top scorer in her team and received a call-up from Spain under-19 team. She remained there for three years. During this period, she received the awards for best player and top scorer at the Atlantic Tournament. Having played in mixed-gender youth leagues from the age of four, she eventually served as the captain of the U19 National Team.

The beginning of the 2008–09 season was promising for her. Patri had played 11 of the first 12 games of her team (with the "number 7" on her back) and scored 2 goals, but before the end of the first round of the Superliga she suffered a back injury. Injury that is much delayed in time, and a chronic pain in this area and as a consequence of this a lack of confidence that led her to not renew her contract with FC Barcelona and having to find accommodation in the club of her city (CD Ponferrada) which at that time was fighting to promoted to Primera División, and where she was converted into a deep-lying playmaker momentarily.

At the end of the 2013–2014 season CD Ponferrada relegated to Regional Division (third level of league competition for Spanish women's football), despite this Patri was considered one of the best attacking midfielders in the tournament (18 goals in 25 league matches), which led her to sign with a Primera División team: Sporting de Huelva, coincidentally the same team that she had scored a hat-trick years ago. There she played 11 games in league (531 minutes) with the blanquiazul shirt and getting 4 goals.

On January 6, 2015, El Día de los Reyes (The Day of the Kings) or Epiphany day her signing for ASPTT Albi, newly promoted team to the Division 1 Féminine was announced. Her debut with les Jaunardes was delayed by bureaucratic reasons until 5 February 2015 in a home game against Paris Saint-Germain (17th game) at Stade Maurice Rigaud in Albi. She scored her first D1 goal against Arras FCF in her second match as a starter.

== Career statistics ==
=== Club ===
Club	Season	League		Cup		Total	
Club	Season	Apps	Goals	Apps	Goals	Apps	Goals
FC Barcelona B	2005–06 Primera Nacional	?	?	-	-	?	?
Oviedo Moderno CF	2006–07 Superliga	26	12	-	-	26	12
Oviedo Moderno CF	2007–08 Superliga	18	4	-	-	18	4
FC Barcelona	2008–09 Superliga	11	2	0	0	11	2
FC Barcelona	2009–10 Superliga	?	?	0	0	?	?
FC Barcelona	2010–11 Superliga	?	?	0	0	?	?
CD Ponferrada	2011–12 Segunda División	16	7	-	-	16	7
CD Ponferrada	2012–13 Segunda División	25	6	-	-	25	6
CD Ponferrada	2013–14 Segunda División	25	18	-	-	25	18
Sporting de Huelva	2014–15 Primera División	11	4			11	4
ASPTT Albi	2014–15 Division 1 Féminine	6	1	0	0	6	1
ASPTT Albi	2015–16 Division 1 Féminine	18	5	0	0	18	5
ASPTT Albi	2016–17 Division 1 Féminine	21	0	2	0	21	0
ASPTT Albi	2017–18 Division 1 Féminine	8	0	2	3	12	3

=== International ===
Team	Years	Caps	Goals
Spain under-19	2007	11	17
Spain under-19	2008	8	7

==== International goals (under-19) ====
#	Date	Venue	Opponent	Score	Result	Competition
1.	28 March 2007	La Palma	Russia	1–0	3–0	Torneo Atlántico
2.	28 March 2007	La Palma	Russia	3–0	3–0	Torneo Atlántico
3.	12 April 2007	Pergine Valsugana	Serbia	2–0	11–0	UEFA Women's u19 Championship qualification (Second qualifying round)
4.	12 April 2007	Pergine Valsugana	Serbia	3–0	11–0	UEFA Women's u19 Championship qualification (Second qualifying round)
5.	12 April 2007	Pergine Valsugana	Serbia	4–0	11–0	UEFA Women's u19 Championship qualification (Second qualifying round)
6.	12 April 2007	Pergine Valsugana	Serbia	6–0	11–0	UEFA Women's u19 Championship qualification (Second qualifying round)
7.	15 April 2007	Mezzolombardo	Switzerland	1–0	3–1	UEFA Women's u19 Championship qualification (Second qualifying round)
8.	15 April 2007	Mezzolombardo	Switzerland	2–1	3–1	UEFA Women's u19 Championship qualification (Second qualifying round)
9.	15 April 2007	Mezzolombardo	Switzerland	3–1	3–1	UEFA Women's u19 Championship qualification (Second qualifying round)
10.	27 September 2007	Kaunas	Lithuania	0–1	0–14	UEFA Women's u19 Championship qualification (First qualifying round)
11.	27 September 2007	Kaunas	Lithuania	0–3	0–14	UEFA Women's u19 Championship qualification (First qualifying round)
12.	27 September 2007	Kaunas	Lithuania	0–7	0–14	UEFA Women's u19 Championship qualification (First qualifying round)
13.	27 September 2007	Kaunas	Lithuania	0–10	0–14	UEFA Women's u19 Championship qualification (First qualifying round)
14.	27 September 2007	Kaunas	Lithuania	0–14	0–14	UEFA Women's u19 Championship qualification (First qualifying round)
15.	29 September 2007	Kaunas	Faroe Islands	1–0	12–0	UEFA Women's u19 Championship qualification (First qualifying round)
16.	29 September 2007	Kaunas	Faroe Islands	6–0	12–0	UEFA Women's u19 Championship qualification (First qualifying round)
17.	29 September 2007	Kaunas	Faroe Islands	8–0	12–0	UEFA Women's u19 Championship qualification (First qualifying round)
18.	20 March 2008	La Palma	Russia	3–1	7–1	Torneo Atlántico
19.	20 March 2008	La Palma	Russia	4–1	7–1	Torneo Atlántico
20.	28 April 2008	Las Rozas	Republic of Ireland	3–1	3–1	UEFA Women's u19 Championship qualification (Second qualifying round)
21.	25 September 2008	Kaunas	Cyprus	3–0	9–0	UEFA Women's u19 Championship qualification (First qualifying round)
22.	25 September 2008	Kaunas	Cyprus	4–0	9–0	UEFA Women's u19 Championship qualification (First qualifying round)
23.	25 September 2008	Kaunas	Cyprus	7–0	9–0	UEFA Women's u19 Championship qualification (First qualifying round)
24.	25 September 2008	Kaunas	Cyprus	0–3	9–0	UEFA Women's u19 Championship qualification (First qualifying round)

=== Hat-tricks ===
For	Against	Result	Competition	Date
Oviedo Moderno CF	Sporting de Huelva	3–0	Superliga Femenina	17 December 2006
Spain under-19	Serbia under-19	11–0^{4}	UEFA Women's u19 Championship qualification	12 April 2007
Spain under-19	Switzerland under-19	12–0	UEFA Women's u19 Championship qualification	15 April 2007
Spain under-19	Lithuania under-19	14–0^{5}	UEFA Women's u19 Championship qualification	27 September 2007
Spain under-19	Faroe Islands under-19	0–12	UEFA Women's u19 Championship qualification	29 September 2007
Spain under-19	Cyprus under-19	9–0	UEFA Women's u19 Championship qualification	25 September 2008
CD Ponferrada	SD Compostela	0–4	Segunda División	13 April 2014
Sporting de Huelva	CE Sant Gabriel	2–6	Primera División	12 October 2014
ASPTT Albi	AS Muret	0–8	Coupe de France	7 January 2018

^{4} Patri scored 4 goals
^{5} Patri scored 5 goals

== Honours ==
- Torneo del Atlántico most valuable player: 2007
- Torneo del Atlántico leading scorer: 2007
- Trofeo Quini (female top scorer in Asturias): 2007, 2008
