= Fiamma Benítez =

Spanish footballer (born 2004)

Fiamma
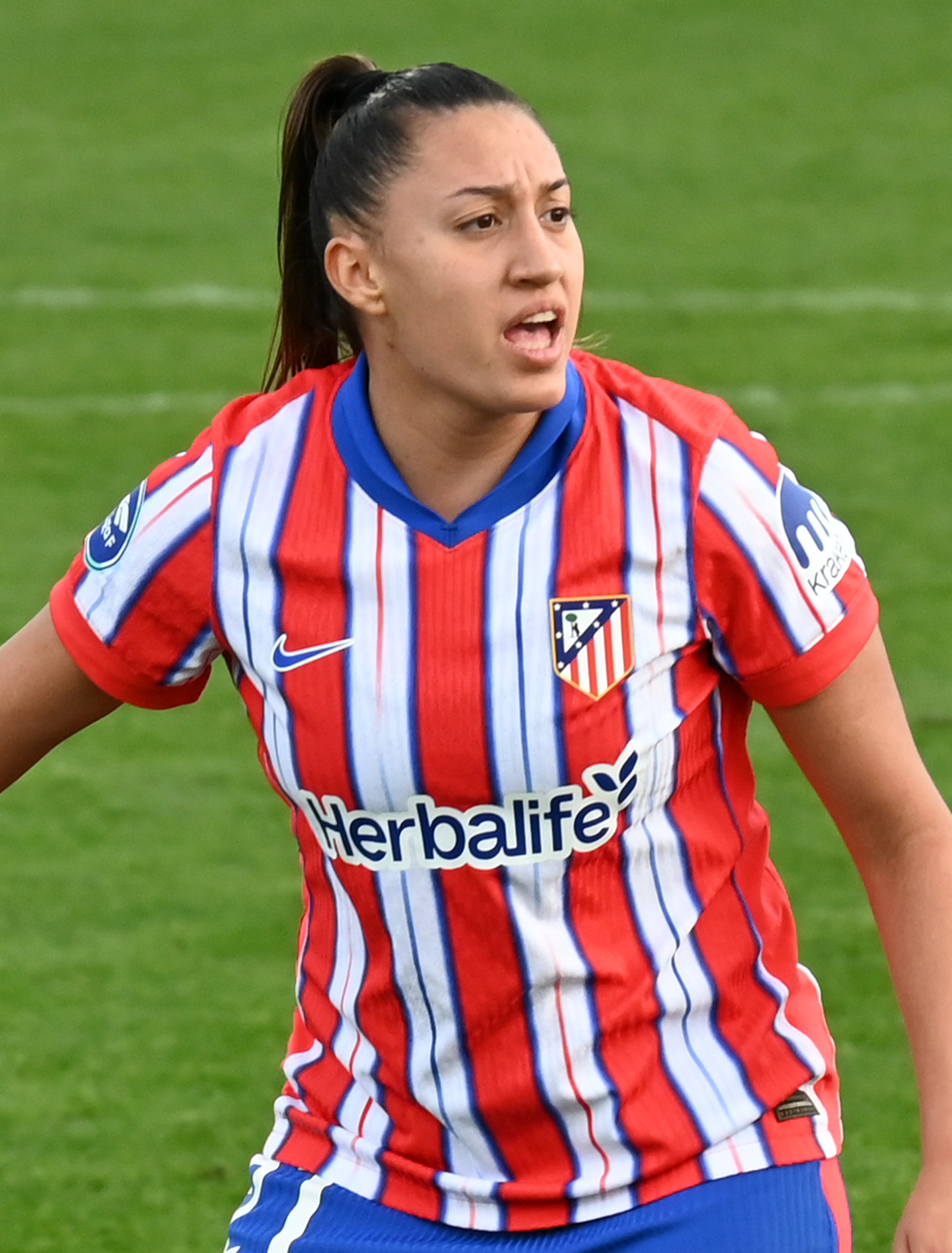
- Fiamma with Atlético Madrid in 2024

Personal information
- Full name: Fiamma Benítez Iannuzzi
- Date of birth: 19 June 2004 (age 22)
- Place of birth: Dénia, Spain
- Height: 1.68 m (5 ft 6 in)
- Positions: Midfielder; forward

Team information
- Current team: Atlético Madrid
- Number: 10

Senior career*
| Years | Team | Apps | (Gls) |
| 2019–2021 | Levante B | 31 | (6) |
| 2020–2022 | Levante | 26 | (0) |
| 2022–2024 | Valencia | 57 | (5) |
| 2024– | Atlético Madrid | 70 | (16) |

International career^{‡}
| 2019 | Spain U17 | 1 | (0) |
| 2020 | Spain U16 | 1 | (0) |
| 2021–2023 | Spain U19 | 19 | (9) |
| 2022 | Spain U20 | 5 | (0) |
| 2023– | Spain U23 | 2 | (2) |
| 2022– | Spain | 9 | (2) |
Medal record
Women's football
Representing Spain
UEFA Women's Nations League
| Winner | 2024 France–Netherlands–Spain |
FIFA U-20 Women's World Cup
| Winner | 2022 Costa Rica |
UEFA Women's Under-19 Championship
| Winner | 2022 Czech Republic |
| Winner | 2023 Belgium |
- * Club domestic league appearances and goals as of 16:23, 21 November 2026 (UTC) ‡ National team caps and goals as of 03:57, 23 December 2023 (UTC)

Fiamma Benítez Iannuzzi (born 19 June 2004), known mononymously as Fiamma, is a Spanish professional footballer who plays as a midfielder or forward for Liga F club Atlético Madrid and the Spain women's national team.

== Early life ==
Fiamma was born in Dénia to Argentine parents. Her maternal grandfather was Italian.

== Club career ==
Fiamma has played for Levante in Spain. She appeared in the professional 2021–22 Primera División for them.

== International career ==
Fiamma was eligible to play for Spain, Italy or Argentina and had shown interest in playing for the latter. Representing the former, she won the 2022 UEFA Women's Under-19 Championship and the 2022 FIFA U-20 Women's World Cup and made her senior debut on 11 November 2022 as a 56th-minute substitution in a 7–0 friendly home win, coincidentally over Argentina. She became cap-tied to Spain when she played and scored in a UEFA Women's Nations League victory over Sweden in December 2023.

== Career statistics ==
=== International ===
Scores and results list Spain's goal tally first, score column indicates score after each Benítez goal.

List of international goals scored by Fiamma Benítez
| No. | Date | Venue | Opponent | Score | Result | Competition |
|---|---|---|---|---|---|---|
| 1 | 16 February 2023 | Industree Group Stadium, Gosford, Australia | Jamaica | 3–0 | 3–0 | 2023 Cup of Nations |
| 2 | 5 December 2023 | La Rosaleda, Málaga, Spain | Sweden | 4–3 | 5–3 | UEFA Women's Nations League |

== Honours ==
Spain U19

- UEFA Women's Under-19 Championship: 2022, 2023

Spain U20

- FIFA U-20 Women's World Cup: 2022

Spain

- UEFA Women's Nations League: 2023–24
