= Anna Buhigas =

American association football player (born 1994)

Personal information
- Full name: Anna Rosa Buhigas
- Date of birth: December 16, 1994 (age 31)
- Height: 1.70 m (5 ft 7 in)
- Position: Goalkeeper

College career
Years	Team	Apps	(Gls)
2013–2016	Lipscomb Bisons		

Senior career*
Years	Team	Apps	(Gls)
2017–2018	Verona		
2018–2019	Pyrgos Limassol		
2018–2019	Tavagnacco		
2019–2020	Real Betis		
2020–2021	Sporting de Huelva		
2021	KFF Vllaznia		
2022–2024	Pomigliano		
- * Club domestic league appearances and goals

Anna Rosa Buhigas (born December 16, 1994) is an American former soccer player who played as a goalkeeper.

She played for Real Betis.

== Career ==
Buhigas attended Lipscomb University and played for university team, Lipscomb Bisons whilst playing Buhigas won the ASUN Conference as best athlete and best goalkeeper of the year.

Buhigas signed her first professional soccer contract with Serie A team Verona in 2017. After Buhigas's first season, she left to play for Pyrgos Limassol in Cyprus. After one season in Cyprus, Buhigas returned to Italy to play for Tavagnacco. In 2019, she moved to Real Betis. The following season, she moved to Sporting de Huelva, where she played for two seasons. In 2021/2022 season, she moved to the Serie A side Pomigliano and stayed there for the rest of her senior career. Since retiring from professional soccer, Buhigas has taken up coaching at the University of Tampa's soccer program.
