= Tori DellaPeruta =

Italian and American soccer player (born 2004)

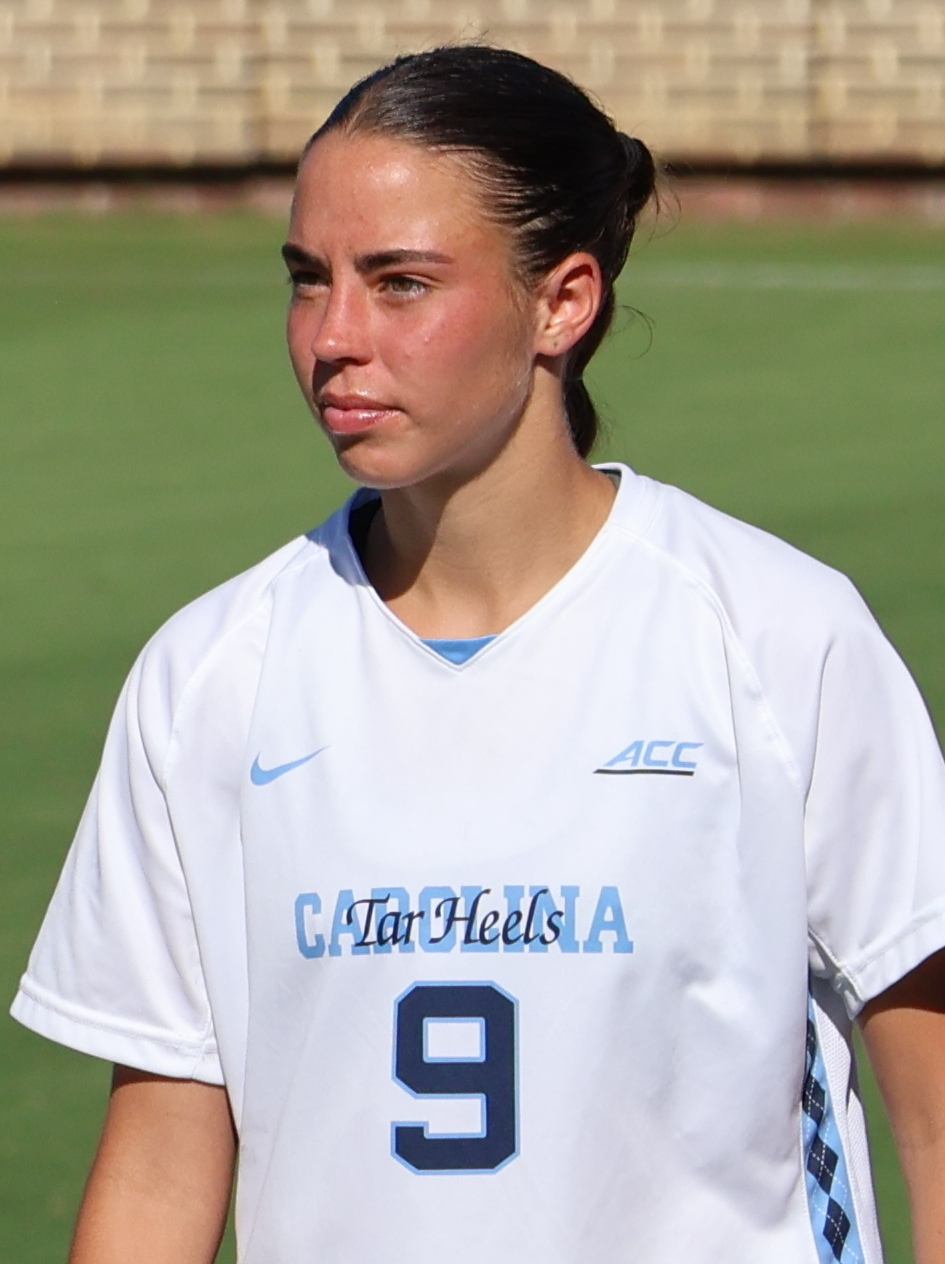
- DellaPeruta with North Carolina in 2023

Personal information
- Full name: Victoria Marie DellaPeruta
- Date of birth: March 21, 2004 (age 22)
- Place of birth: Atlanta, Georgia, U.S.
- Height: 5 ft 8 in (1.73 m)
- Position: Forward

Team information
- Current team: Feyenoord
- Number: 11

Youth career
- UFA
- 2018–2020: Tophat SC
- 2020–2022: UFA

College career
Years	Team	Apps	(Gls)
2022–2023	North Carolina Tar Heels	40	(8)

Senior career*
Years	Team	Apps	(Gls)
2022	Pomigliano	9	(4)
2024	Sampdoria	11	(8)
2024–2025	Roma	0	(0)
2024–2025	→ Sampdoria (loan)	16	(1)
2025–	Fiorentina	10	(0)
2026	→ Feyenoord (loan)	12	(4)
2026–	Feyenoord	1	(1)

International career
2022–2023	Italy U19	9	(3)
2023	Italy U23	1	(0)
- * Club domestic league appearances and goals as of August 16, 2026

Victoria Marie DellaPeruta (born March 21, 2004) is a professional soccer player who plays as a forward for Vrouwen Eredivisie club Feyenoord. Born in the United States, she is a youth international for Italy. She played college soccer for the North Carolina Tar Heels. She was named the USA Today national high school player of the year in 2021.

DellaPeruta made her Serie A Women debut with Pomigliano at age 17 in 2022. She then played two seasons for the North Carolina Tar Heels before returning to Italy with Sampdoria in 2024. Roma then acquired her but she remained at Sampdoria on loan and then signed with Fiorentina in 2025.

== Early life ==
DellaPeruta was born in Atlanta, Georgia, to Barbara and Adam DellaPeruta, and has an older sister, Talia, who is also a soccer player. Her grandmother is from Pescara and her grandfather from Naples. Initially a goalkeeper, she began playing as a midfielder at age five. She played club soccer for United Futbol Academy until age 12, then spent two years with Tophat SC, before returning to UFA. She committed to the University of North Carolina as a high school freshman.

DellaPeruta played one season of high school soccer at West Forsyth High School during her junior year in 2021. She scored a school record 54 goals while leading the team to a 19–2 record and their first state championship. In the GHSA Class 7A final, she scored the only goal of the match against previously undefeated Lambert. Following the season, she was named a United Soccer Coaches All-American and the USA Today Girls' Soccer Player of the Year. She graduated early from high school in December 2021, intending to enroll at North Carolina in the spring, but instead began looking to play in Italy when she received her Italian passport the same month.

=== Pomigliano ===
After high school, 17-year-old DellaPeruta tried out for Serie A Femminile club Pomigliano during the 2021–22 season. She spoke little Italian, and her coach and teammates little English, but signed with the first team ten days into training. She made her debut on January 22, 2022, scoring the 2–1 winner as a halftime substitute against Empoli. She scored again the following game against Roma. On March 6, she made her first start in a 1–0 win over Internazionale and stayed in the starting lineup for the rest of the season. On May 14, needing Pomigliano to win their season finale to avoid relegation, she scored the second-half equalizer against Napoli to spark a 3–1 comeback victory, securing their place in the top flight. She scored 4 goals in 9 appearances for the club.

== College career ==
After her stint with Pomigliano, DellaPeruta played two seasons for the North Carolina Tar Heels in 2022 and 2023. She had 8 goals in 40 appearances (19 starts), missing a few games each year to play with the Italian youth national team. Her sister, Talia, was her teammate both seasons.

== Club career ==
=== Sampdoria ===
After two years at the University of North Carolina, DellaPeruta decided to give up her remaining college eligibility and signed with Italian club Sampdoria alongside her sister, Talia, in January 2024. She debuted for the club on January 14, coming on as a late substitute in a 1–0 win against Como. She scored her first goal for the club in a 2–1 loss to Fiorentina. On March 16, in her first league start for Sampdoria, she scored four goals in a 5–0 rout against her former club Pomigliano.

On July 26, 2024, it was announced that Roma had signed DellaPeruta to a four-year contract, but she was immediately loaned back to Sampdoria for the coming season. On December 7, she scored her only goal of the season in Sampdoria's 3–1 defeat to Fiorentina. During her year and a half at Sampdoria, she scored 9 goals in 36 appearances in all competitions.

=== Fiorentina ===
On February 4, 2025, it was announced that DellaPeruta had joined Fiorentina, signing a three-and-a-half-year contract. She debuted for the club in a 0–0 draw with AC Milan. She spent nearly a year in Florence, making 13 appearances and scoring 0 goals in all competitions.

=== Feyenoord ===
On January 7, 2026, DellaPeruta was sent on loan to Dutch club Feyenoord for the rest of the season, reuniting with her sister. She made her debut in a 1–0 win over Excelsior. On March 11, she scored her first goal for the club in a 2–0 win over Twente. She ended the season scoring in three straight matches, finishing with a 3–0 victory over NAC Breda on the final day as Feyenoord placed third in the league, their best finish in club history.

On June 1, 2026, DellaPeruta signed a two-year contract to make a permanent move to Feyenoord. On August 16, she began the season with a goal and an assist in a 2–1 win against Heerenveen.

== International career ==
DellaPeruta has United States and Italian citizenship. She was called into a virtual camp for the United States national under-18 team in 2021. After her stint at Pomigliano, she played for the Italian national under-19 team at the 2022 UEFA Women's Under-19 Championship. She was called up to the Italian under-23 team in September 2023.

DellaPeruta received her first senior national team call-up with Italy for a training camp before UEFA Women's Euro qualifying in May 2024.
