= Iris Ómarsdóttir =

Norwegian footballer

Personal information
- Date of birth: 12 July 2003 (age 23)
- Height: 1.75 m (5 ft 9 in)
- Position: Forward

Team information
- Current team: Fiorentina
- Number: 51

Youth career
- –2016: Sagene
- 2016–2018: Stabæk

Senior career*
Years	Team	Apps	(Gls)
2018–2025	Stabæk	105	(32)
2025–	Fiorentina	6	(2)

International career^{‡}
2018	Norway U15	4	(2)
2019	Norway U16	15	(15)
2020	Norway U17	2	(1)
2021–2022	Norway U19	14	(9)
2022–	Norway U23	13	(2)
- * Club domestic league appearances and goals as of 6 December 2025 ‡ National team caps and goals as of 7 April 2025

Iris Ómarsdóttir (Icelandic: [ˈiːrɪs ˈouːmarsˌtouhtɪr]; born 12 July 2003) is a Norwegian footballer who plays as a forward for Serie A club ACF Fiorentina. She has previously played for Toppserien club Stabæk.

== Club career ==
=== Stabæk ===
She hails from Oslo and is half Icelandic. She started her youth career in Sagene IF, where she played for the boys' team together with her twin brother Fabian. After joining Stabæk in the fall of 2016, she made her senior debut for the club in September 2018, being the youngest ever to do so. She was drafted into the senior squad ahead of the 2019 season.

In the 2022 Norwegian Women's Cup, she scored the goal that put Stabæk through against Rosenborg in the semi-final. She also scored in the cup final against Brann, albeit Stabæk lost 3–1. She also participated in the 2022 UEFA Women's Under-19 Championship, among others scoring two goals to secure victory against Germany. Omarsdottir and Norway ended up winning silver, after she also scored a consolation goal in the final against Spain.

In May 2024, she extended her contract with Stabæk until the end of 2025. At that particular time, she was top goalscorer of the 2024 Toppserien.

=== Fiorentina ===
In September 2025, Omarsdottir signed for Italian club ACF Fiorentina on a two-year contract through 2027.
