= Stovky =

Football stadium in Frýdek-Místek, Czech Republic

- Interactive map of Stovky
- Location: Horní 3276, Frýdek-Místek, Czech Republic, 738 01
- Coordinates: 49°41′45″N 18°20′35″E
- Owner: Frýdek-Místek
- Capacity: 12,400
- Surface: Artificial turf
- Field size: 105×68 m

Construction
- Built: 1970s
- Opened: 1976
- Renovated: 2011

Tenant
- MFK Frýdek-Místek

Stovky is a prominent football stadium in Frýdek-Místek, Czech Republic. It is the home venue of MFK Frýdek-Místek.

The stadium was built in the early 1970s. In 2008, it was gifted to the town of Frýdek-Místek and immediately scheduled for renovation. The reconstruction was completed in 2011.
