= Sofie Zdebel =

German footballer (born 2004)

Personal information
- Full name: Sofie Lena Zdebel
- Date of birth: 8 August 2004 (age 22)
- Place of birth: Germany
- Height: 1.60 m (5 ft 3 in)
- Position: Midfielder

Team information
- Current team: Bayer Leverkusen
- Number: 16

Youth career
- SV Altenberg
- SV Bergisch Gladbach 09
- 2018–2020: Bayer Leverkusen

Senior career*
Years	Team	Apps	(Gls)
2020–	Bayer Leverkusen	97	(2)

International career^{‡}
2018–2019	Germany U15	4	(0)
2019–2020	Germany U16	5	(0)
2021–2023	Germany U19	13	(2)
2024–	Germany U20	9	(1)
2024–	Germany U23	15	(0)
- * Club domestic league appearances and goals as of 20 November 2026 ‡ National team caps and goals as of 9 October 2026

Sofie Lena Zdebel (born 8 August 2004) is a German professional footballer who plays as a midfielder for Frauen-Bundesliga club Bayer 04 Leverkusen.

== Club career ==
Zdebel joined Bayer Leverkusen in 2018. She was promoted to the first team in July 2020. She made her professional debut for the club on 5 March 2021 in a 4–2 league win against 1. FFC Turbine Potsdam. In January 2022, she extended her contract with the club until June 2024.

In May 2024, Zdebel signed a two-year contract extension with Bayer Leverkusen until June 2026.

== International career ==
As a youth international, Zdebel was part of the German squad at the 2022 UEFA Women's Under-19 Championship and the 2024 FIFA U-20 Women's World Cup. On 1 September 2024, she made her FIFA U-20 Women's World Cup debut in a 5–2 win against Venezuela and was named as the player of the match.

== Personal life ==
Zdebel is the daughter of former professional footballer Tomasz Zdebel.

== Career statistics ==
As of match played 20 November 2026

Appearances and goals by club, season and competition
Club	Season	League			Cup		Total	
Club	Season	Division	Apps	Goals	Apps	Goals	Apps	Goals
Bayer Leverkusen	2020–21	Frauen-Bundesliga	5	0	0	0	5	0
Bayer Leverkusen	2021–22	Frauen-Bundesliga	10	0	1	0	11	0
Bayer Leverkusen	2022–23	Frauen-Bundesliga	13	0	2	0	15	0
Bayer Leverkusen	2023–24	Frauen-Bundesliga	19	0	3	0	22	0
Bayer Leverkusen	2024–25	Frauen-Bundesliga	19	1	2	1	21	2
Bayer Leverkusen	2025–26	Frauen-Bundesliga	23	1	2	0	25	1
Bayer Leverkusen	2026–27	Frauen-Bundesliga	8	0	2	0	10	0
Career total			97	2	12	1	109	3
