= Nicole Arcangeli =

Italian footballer (born 2003)

Personal information
- Date of birth: 22 October 2003 (age 23)
- Position: Forward

Team information
- Current team: Grasshopper Club Zurich

Senior career*
Years	Team	Apps	(Gls)
2020–2025	Juventus	1	(0)
2023	→ Parma (loan)	12	(0)
2023–2024	→ Como (loan)	11	(0)
2024	→ Pomigliano (loan)	13	(3)
2024–2025	→ Sampdoria (loan)	9	(0)

International career
2019	Italy U17		
2021–2022	Italy U19		
2023	Italy U23		
- * Club domestic league appearances and goals

Nicole Arcangeli (born 22 October 2003) is an Italian footballer who plays as a striker for Grasshopper Club Zurich. She has played for Sampdoria, Juventus and for the Italian Under-23 national team.

She became top goalscorer of the 2022 UEFA Women's Under-19 Championship with 5 goals.
