= Silvia Lloris =

Spanish footballer (born 2004)

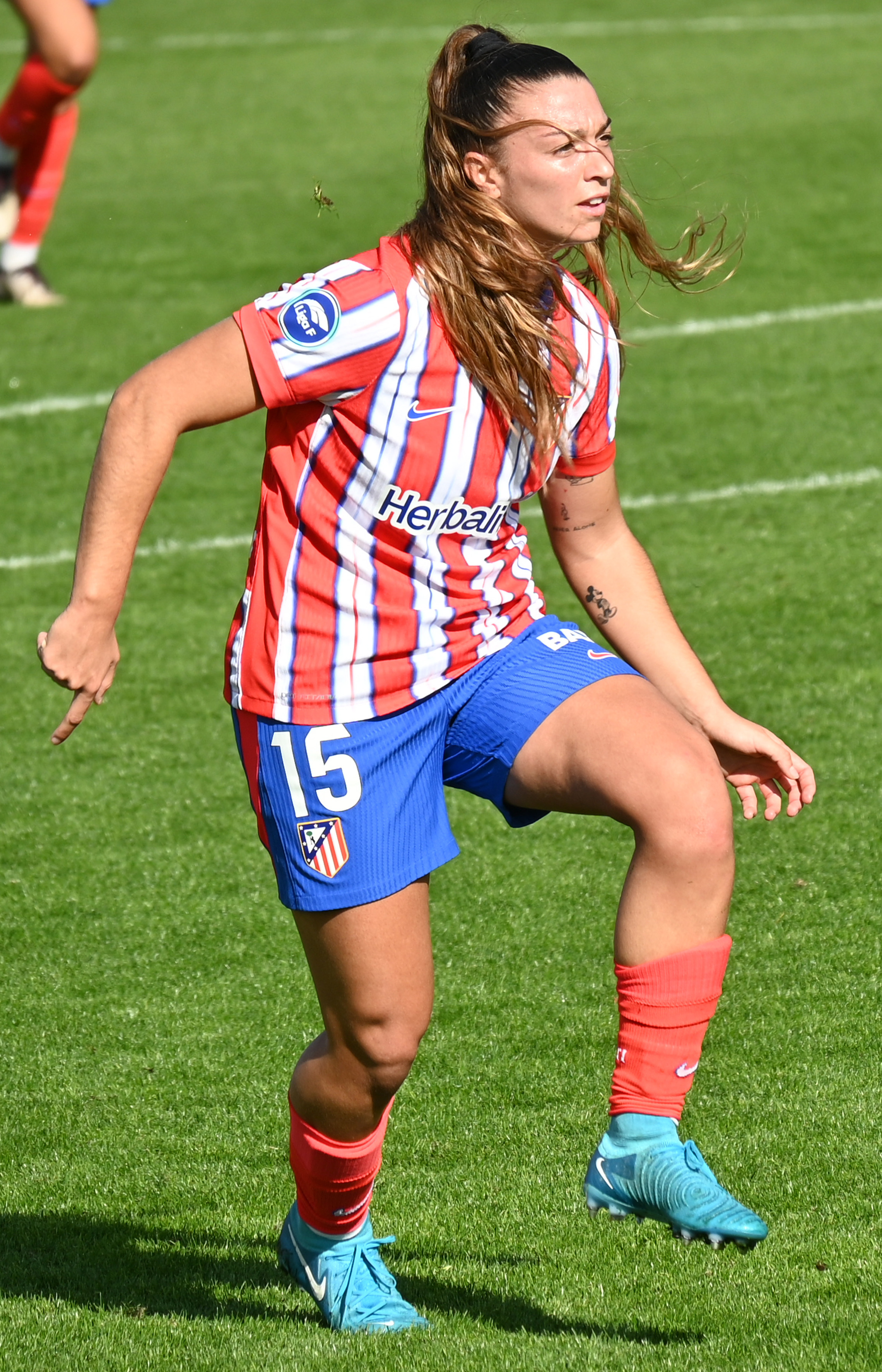
- Lloris with Atlético Madrid in 2024

Personal information
- Full name: Silvia Lloris Nicolás
- Date of birth: 15 May 2004 (age 22)
- Place of birth: Murcia, Spain
- Height: 1.68 m (5 ft 6 in)
- Positions: Defender; midfielder

Team information
- Current team: Atlético Madrid
- Number: 8

Youth career
- 2014–2020: El Palmar

Senior career*
Years	Team	Apps	(Gls)
2020–2021	Levante B	16	(4)
2020–2024	Levante	60	(2)
2024–	Atlético Madrid	26	(3)

International career^{‡}
2019	Spain U17	1	(0)
2020	Spain U16	1	(1)
2021–2023	Spain U19	21	(4)
2022	Spain U20	5	(0)
2022–	Spain U23	6	(2)
2025–	Spain	0	(0)
Medal record
Women's football
Representing Spain
FIFA U-20 Women's World Cup
Winner	2022 Costa Rica
UEFA Women's Under-19 Championship
Winner	2022 Czech Republic
Winner	2023 Belgium
- * Club domestic league appearances and goals as of 04:15, 23 December 2023 (UTC) ‡ National team caps and goals as of 13 May 2025

Silvia Lloris Nicolás (born 15 May 2004) is a Spanish footballer who plays as a defender or midfielder for Liga F club Atlético Madrid.

== Club career ==
Lloris started her career at El Palmar's academy, a men's team in Murcia. In 2020 she joined Levante UD, and consolidated herself in various age group teams of the Spain national squads.

== Honours ==
Spain U19

- UEFA Women's Under-19 Championship: 2022, 2023

Spain U20

- FIFA U-20 Women's World Cup: 2022
