= Lucía Moral =

Spanish footballer (born 2004)

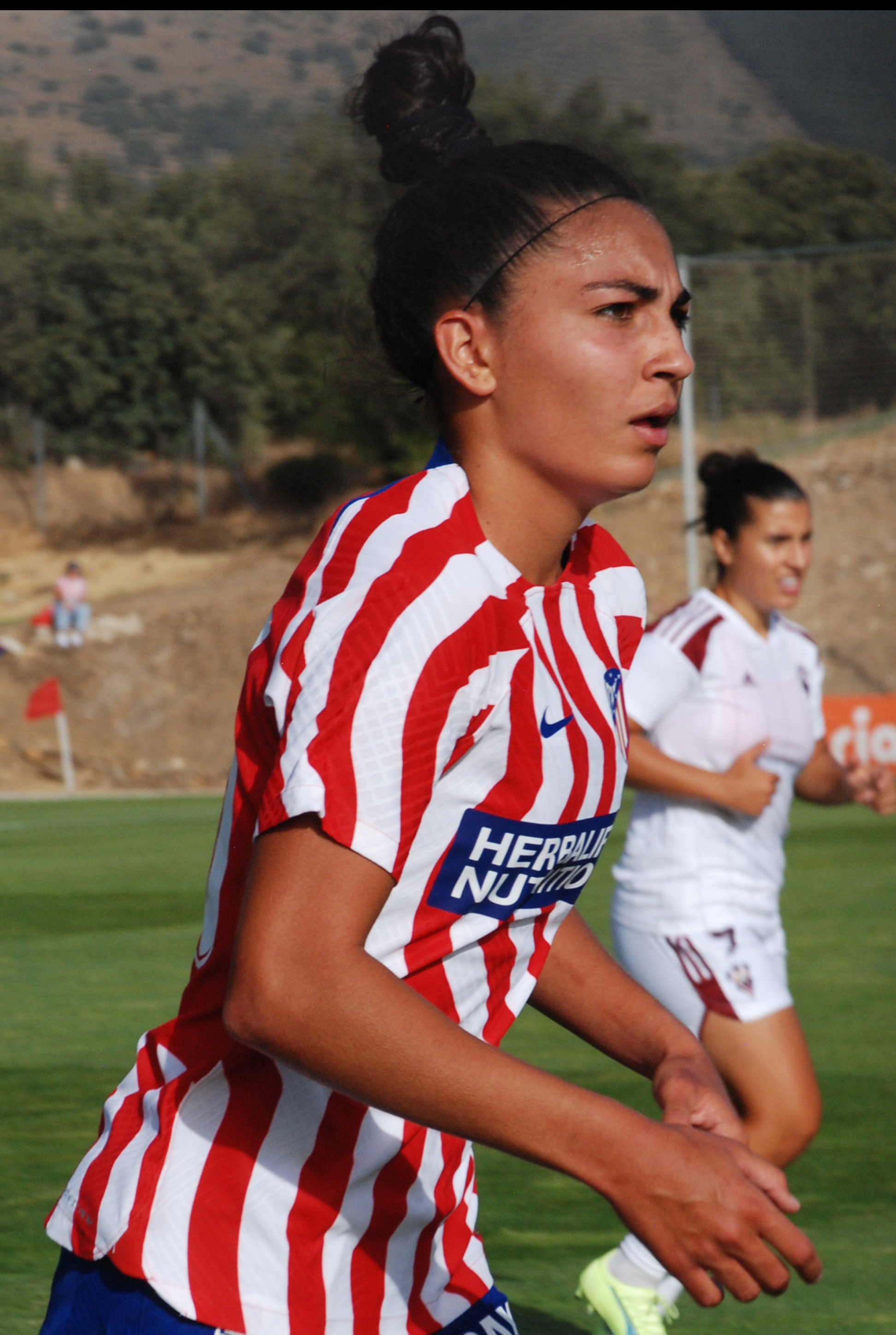

Personal information
- Full name: Lucía Moral Ruíz
- Date of birth: 11 February 2004
- Place of birth: Córdoba, Spain
- Position: Striker

Team information
- Current team: Atlético Madrid

Senior career*
Years	Team	Apps	(Gls)
2022–	Atlético Madrid	43	(8)
2024-	→ Sevilla (loan)	6	(0)
Medal record
Women's football
Representing Spain
UEFA Women's Under-19 Championship
Winner	2022 Czech Republic
Winner	2023 Belgium
- * Club domestic league appearances and goals

Lucía Moral Ruíz (born 11 February 2004) is a Spanish footballer who currently plays as a striker for Sevilla FC on loan from Atlético Madrid.

== Early life ==
Moral is a native of Córdoba, Spain.

== Career ==
Moral helped the Spain women's national under-19 football team win the 2023 UEFA Women's Under-19 Championship.

== Style of play ==
Moral mainly operates as a striker and has been described as "stands out for her physical power and her wide range of shots, in addition to having a special intuition when it comes to generating spaces and associating with her teammate".

== Personal life ==
Moral is nicknamed "Wifi".

== Honours ==
Spain U19

- UEFA Women's Under-19 Championship: 2022, 2023

Individual

- Liga F Player of the Month: February 2026
