= Pomigliano CF =

Italian football club

Pomigliano
- Full name: Pomigliano Calcio Femminile
- Nicknames: Granata, Le Pantere
- Short name: Pomigliano C.F.
- Founded: June 21, 2019; 6 years ago
- Stadium: Ugo Gobbato Stadium, Pomigliano d'Arco
- Capacity: 1,600
- President: Raffaele Pipola
- Coach: Roberto Carannante
- League: Serie B
- 2023–24: Serie A, 10th of 10 (Relegated to Serie B)
- Website: https://pomiglianocalciofemminile.it/
Home colours	Away colours

Pomigliano Calcio Femminile, also known as Pomigliano, is an Italian women's association football club based in Pomigliano d'Arco, within Metropolitan City of Naples. It was founded in June 2019 and secured two successive promotions in its first two seasons, to enter Serie A in 2021.

== History ==
In June 2019, Raffaele Pipola the President of ASDC Pomigliano, a club in the men's Serie D, formed a women's section for the club by buying out an existing team called Vapa Virtus Napoli. Due to the COVID-19 pandemic in Italy, their debut 2019–20 season was stopped early and since Pomigliano were leading their regional Serie C section they were promoted to Serie B. In 2020–21 they finished in second place behind Lazio to claim their second successive promotion, into the top tier Serie A.

Former Italy women's national football team player Manuela Tesse was the coach who secured the second promotion, but she was fired three games into the 2021–22 Serie A season. The season was concluded in eight place, securing the spot in Serie A. In 2022–23 Serie A season Pomigliano CF finished in ninth position, entering the play-off against Lazio, which finished in second position in Serie B. Pomigliano won the play-off and maintained its spot in Serie A. Despite their efforts, Pomigliano faced relegation following their 2023-24 campaign which saw them finish last in Serie A with 12 points.

== Players ==
=== Current squad ===
As of 30 January 2024

Note: Flags indicate national team as defined under FIFA eligibility rules; some limited exceptions apply. Players may hold more than one non-FIFA nationality.

No.	Pos.	Nation	Player
2	DF	ITA	Gaia Apicella (captain)
3	DF	ITA	Martina Fusini
4	DF	USA	Aryana Harvey
5	DF	ITA	Sara Caiazzo
6	DF	FRA	Iris Rabot
7	FW	UGA	Violah Nambi
8	MF	ALB	Greis Domi
9	FW	MLT	Sara Saliba
10	FW	ARG	Dalila Ippólito
11	FW	ITA	Chiara Manca
12	GK	USA	Anna Buhigas

No.	Pos.	Nation	Player
14	FW	ITA	Nicole Arcangeli
15	DF	ITA	Elena Battistini
17	DF	ARG	Marianela Szymanowski
21	MF	ITA	Virginia Di Giammarino
24	DF	ITA	Heden Corrado
28	MF	ITA	Zhanna Ferrario
30	MF	CAN	Irina Talle
33	DF	ITA	Debora Novellino
44	GK	SUI	Emilie Gavillet
99	MF	SRB	Milica Babic
