= Spain women's national under-19 football team =

Spanish youth football team

Spain Women's U-19
- Association: Royal Spanish Football Federation
- Confederation: UEFA (Europe)
- Head coach: David Aznar
- Most caps: Ruth García (29)
- Top scorer: Patricia Martínez (24)
- FIFA code: ESP
First colours	Second colours

UEFA Women's Under-19 Championship
- Appearances: 19 (first in 2000)
- Best result: Winners (2004, 2017, 2018, 2022, 2023, 2024, 2025, 2026)

FIFA U-20 World Cup
- Appearances: 3 (first in 2004)
- Best result: Winners (2022)

The Spain women's national under-19 football team represents Spain in international football in under-19 categories and is controlled by the Royal Spanish Football Federation.

== Competitive record ==
=== UEFA Women's U19 Championship record ===
UEFA Women's U19 Championship record									UEFA Women's U19 Championship Qualification record					
Year	Round	Position	Pld	W	D	L	GF	GA	Pld	W	D	L	GF	GA
No host 1998	did not qualify								3	0	2	1	5	8
(Sweden) 1999	did not qualify								3	1	2	0	5	4
(France) 2000	Runners-up	2nd	3	2	0	1	7	5	6	4	1	1	11	4
(Norway) 2001	Semi-finals	4th	2	0	0	2	0	3	6	2	4	0	10	8
(Sweden) 2002	Group stage	5th	3	1	0	2	2	4	3	2	1	0	9	3
(Germany) 2003	Group stage	8th	3	1	0	2	5	6	3	2	1	0	8	3
(Finland) 2004	Champions	1st	5	4	0	1	10	9	6	5	1	0	30	3
(Hungary) 2005	did not qualify								6	5	0	1	26	2
(Switzerland) 2006	did not qualify								3	2	0	1	12	5
(Iceland) 2007	Group stage	5th	3	1	0	2	2	2	6	5	1	0	36	2
(France) 2008	Group stage	7th	3	1	0	2	2	4	6	5	1	0	37	1
(Belarus) 2009	did not qualify								6	4	1	1	29	5
(North Macedonia) 2010	Group stage	5th	3	1	0	2	6	3	6	5	0	1	19	4
(Italy) 2011	Group stage	7th	3	0	1	2	2	7	6	5	1	0	20	2
(Turkey) 2012	Runners-up	2nd	5	3	1	1	8	1	6	6	0	0	31	2
(Wales) 2013	did not qualify								6	3	0	3	29	8
(Norway) 2014	Runners-up	2nd	5	3	0	2	6	2	3	3	0	0	13	0
(Israel) 2015	Runners-up	2nd	5	2	1	2	9	6	3	3	0	0	23	1
(Slovakia) 2016	Runners-up	2nd	5	4	0	1	15	5	3	3	0	0	13	2
(Northern Ireland) 2017	Champions	1st	5	4	0	1	9	6	6	6	0	0	39	2
(Switzerland) 2018	Champions	1st	5	4	0	1	6	3	6	6	0	0	29	0
(Scotland) 2019	Semi-finals	3rd	4	2	1	1	4	3	3	3	0	0	12	0
(Georgia (country)) 2020	Cancelled								2	2	0	0	19	0
(Belarus) 2021	Cancelled								0	0	0	0	0	0
(Czech Republic) 2022	Champions	1st	5	4	1	0	12	3	6	5	1	0	27	3
(Belgium) 2023	Champions	1st	5	3	1	1	11	2	6	6	0	0	30	0
(Lithuania) 2024	Champions	1st	5	3	1	1	6	3	6	6	0	0	30	1
(Poland) 2025	Champions	1st	5	4	0	1	9	1	6	6	0	0	32	0
(Bosnia and Herzegovina) 2026	Champions	1st	5	4	1	0	12	3	6	5	1	0	24	1
(Hungary) 2027	TBD								TBD					
Total	22/27		82	51	8	28	142	81	137	110	18	9	608	74

=== Copa del Atlántico ===
The Copa del Atlántico Femenina was a European invitational tournament for national under-19 teams in women's association football between 2007 and 2008.

Year	Result	Pld	W	D	L	GF	GA
(Spain) 2007	Champions	2	2	0	0	7	1
(Spain) 2008	Champions	2	2	0	0	9	1
Total	2/2	4	4	0	0	16	2

== Recent schedule and results ==
This list includes match results from the past 12 months, as well as any future matches that have been scheduled.

Legend

Win Draw Loss Fixture

=== 2025 ===
26 November 2025 UEFA Women's U-19 Championship Qualifying Round 1	Spain	8–0	Faroe Islands	Leichtathletikstadion, Duisburg
11:00	Cerrato 15', 19'; Segura 21', 40'; Quer 33'; Rosalía 38'; Moreno 49'; Comendador 74'	Report		Referee: Tjaša Misja (Slovenia)

29 November 2025 UEFA Women's U-19 Championship Qualifying Round 1	Spain	5–1	Belgium	Leichtathletikstadion, Duisburg
11:00	Dorado 38'; Santiago 60'; Gómez 67'; Segura 75'; Comendador 90+4'	Report	Neyrinck 20'	Referee: Milica Milovanović (Serbia)

2 December 2025 UEFA Women's U-19 Championship Qualifying Round 1	Germany	0–5	Spain	Sportschule Wedau, Duisburg
14:30		Report	Segura 45+1', 70'; Jiménez 45+4', 90+6'; Cerrato 57'	Referee: Milica Milovanović (Serbia)

=== 2026 ===
12 April 2026 UEFA Women's U-19 Championship Qualifying Round 2	Spain	3–0	Hungary	Estádio Nacional, Oeiras
12:00	Domínguez 30'; Gómez 86'; Santiago 90+4'	Report		Referee: Alexandra Collin (France)

15 April 2026 UEFA Women's U-19 Championship Qualifying Round 2	Spain	3–0	Northern Ireland	Estádio Nacional, Oeiras
12:00	Gómez 27'; Dorado 32'; Boyd 39' (o.g.)	Report		Referee: Ana Maria Terteleac (Romania)

18 April 2026 UEFA Women's U-19 Championship Qualifying Round 2	Portugal	0–0	Spain	Cidade do Futebol, Oeiras
18:00		Report		Referee: Ana Maria Terteleac (Romania)

== Players ==
=== Current squad ===
The following players were called up for three friendly matches.

Caps and goals as of 3 December 2024

No.	Pos.	Player	Date of birth (age)	Caps	Goals	Club
	GK	Laia López	29 January 2007 (age 19)	3	0	(Royal Spanish Football Federation) Real Madrid
	GK	Julia Arrula	29 January 2006 (age 20)	3	0	(Royal Spanish Football Federation) Real Sociedad
	GK	Ziara Vega	30 August 2007 (age 19)	0	0	(Royal Spanish Football Federation) Athletic Club
	DF	Aïcha Cámara	11 December 2006 (age 19)	16	0	(Royal Spanish Football Federation) FC Barcelona
	DF	Noemí Bejarano	27 June 2006 (age 20)	14	1	(Royal Spanish Football Federation) Real Madrid
	DF	Lorena Cubo	23 January 2007 (age 19)	3	2	(Royal Spanish Football Federation) Barcelona
	DF	Aiara Agirrezabala	2 October 2008 (age 18)	3	0	(Royal Spanish Football Federation) Real Sociedad
	DF	Martina González	9 December 2007 (age 18)	2	0	(Royal Spanish Football Federation) Barcelona
	DF	Elsa Santos	12 May 2007 (age 19)	2	0	(Royal Spanish Football Federation) Real Madrid
	DF	Amaya García	10 June 2007 (age 19)	0	0	(Royal Spanish Football Federation) Real Madrid
	MF	Daniela Arques	21 March 2006 (age 20)	19	6	(Royal Spanish Football Federation) Levante
	MF	Cristina Librán	11 January 2006 (age 20)	18	4	(Royal Spanish Football Federation) Madrid CFF
	MF	Elene Gurtubay	3 October 2007 (age 19)	5	0	(Royal Spanish Football Federation) Athletic Club
	MF	Emma Gálvez	19 April 2006 (age 20)	5	0	(Royal Spanish Football Federation) FC Barcelona
	MF	Emma Moreno	2 May 2007 (age 19)	3	0	(Royal Spanish Football Federation) Atlético Madrid
	MF	Clara Serrajordi	7 December 2007 (age 18)	3	0	(Royal Spanish Football Federation) Barcelona
	MF	María Llorella	11 November 2006 (age 19)	0	0	(Royal Spanish Football Federation) Barcelona
	MF	Adriana Folgado	1 April 2007 (age 19)	0	0	(Royal Spanish Football Federation) Real Madrid
	FW	Daniela Agote	27 August 2006 (age 20)	14	6	(Royal Spanish Football Federation) Athletic Club
	FW	Marisa García	22 June 2006 (age 20)	14	3	(Royal Spanish Football Federation) Real Madrid
	FW	Paula Comendador	12 January 2007 (age 19)	7	2	(Royal Spanish Football Federation) Real Madrid
	FW	Celia Segura	10 March 2007 (age 19)	3	2	(Royal Spanish Football Federation) Barcelona
	FW	Alba Cerrato	1 January 2007 (age 19)	1	2	(Royal Spanish Football Federation) Sevilla
	FW	Bibiana Casquero	28 March 2006 (age 20)	0	0	(Royal Spanish Football Federation) Real Madrid

=== Recent call-ups ===
Pos.	Player	Date of birth (age)	Caps	Goals	Club	Latest call-up
^{INJ} Player withdrew from the squad due to an injury^{PRE} Preliminary squad

=== Previous rosters ===
- 2004 FIFA U-19 Women's World Championship squad
- 2017 UEFA Women's Under-19 Championship squad
- 2018 UEFA Women's Under-19 Championship squad
- 2019 UEFA Women's Under-19 Championship squad
- 2022 UEFA Women's Under-19 Championship squad
- 2023 UEFA Women's Under-19 Championship squad
- 2024 UEFA Women's Under-19 Championship squad

== Statistics ==
=== Top Appearances ===
#	Name	Career	Caps	Goals
1	**Ruth García**	2003–2006	29	1
2	Júlia Bartel	2021–2023	28	5
3	**Nahikari García**	2014–2016	27	19
4	**Miriam Diéguez**	2003–2005	26	5
5	Carla Bautista	2017–2019	24	10
5	**Iraia Iturregi**	2002–2004	24	4
5	Martina Fernández	2021–2023	24	4
5	Andrea Medina	2021–2023	24	3
5	Maite Zubieta	2021–2023	24	0
10	**Teresa Abelleira**	2017–2019	23	4
10	Silvia Lloris	2021–2023	23	4
10	Núria Garrote	2014–2016	23	1
10	**Marta Torrejón**	2006–2009	23	6

Those marked in **bold** went on to earn full international caps
Those marked in italic went on to earn full international caps with other national football team

=== Top Goalscorers ===
#	Player	Career	Goals	Caps
1	Patricia Martínez	2007–2008	24	19
2	**Nahikari García**	2014–2016	19	27
3	**Lucía García**	2015–2017	18	19
4	**Adriana Martín**	2002–2004	16	12
5	**Alexia Putellas**	2011–2013	13	20
5	Lucía Moral	2022–2023	13	20
7	**Mariona Caldentey**	2014–2015	12	14
7	Jade Boho	2003–2005	12	21
9	**Andrea Falcón**	2014–2016	11	22
9	Fiamma Benítez	2021-2023	11	22

Those marked in **bold** went on to earn full international caps
Those marked in italic went on to earn full international caps with other national football team

=== Hat-tricks ===
Player	Against	Result	Competition	Date
Adriana Martín	Denmark	4–1	UEFA Women's u19 Championship qualification	15 April 2003
Adriana Martín	Belgium	4–0	UEFA Women's u19 Championship qualification	23 September 2003
Adriana Martín	(Bosnia and Herzegovina) Bosnia & Herzegovina	0–9	UEFA Women's u19 Championship qualification	25 September 2003
Natalia Pablos	Slovakia	9–0	UEFA Women's u19 Championship qualification	24 April 2004
Jade Boho	Czech Republic	1–5	UEFA Women's u19 Championship qualification	2 October 2004
María Paz Vilas ^{6}	Latvia	14–0	UEFA Women's u19 Championship qualification	26 September 2006
Raquel Peña	Latvia	14–0	UEFA Women's u19 Championship qualification	26 September 2006
Patricia Martínez ^{4}	Serbia	11–0	UEFA Women's u19 Championship qualification	12 April 2007
Patricia Martínez	Switzerland	12–0	UEFA Women's u19 Championship qualification	15 April 2007
Patricia Martínez ^{5}	Lithuania	14–0	UEFA Women's u19 Championship qualification	27 September 2007
Joana Flaviano	Lithuania	14–0	UEFA Women's u19 Championship qualification	27 September 2007
Patricia Martínez	Faroe Islands	0–12	UEFA Women's u19 Championship qualification	29 September 2007
Georgina Carreras	Faroe Islands	0–12	UEFA Women's u19 Championship qualification	29 September 2007
Patricia Martínez	Cyprus	9–0	UEFA Women's u19 Championship qualification	25 September 2008
Victoria Losada	Cyprus	9–0	UEFA Women's u19 Championship qualification	25 September 2008
Victoria Losada ^{5}	Lithuania	0–12	UEFA Women's u19 Championship qualification	27 September 2008
Laura Ortiz	(Bosnia and Herzegovina) Bosnia & Herzegovina	0–9	UEFA Women's u19 Championship qualification	17 September 2011
Gema Gili	Moldova	8–0	UEFA Women's u19 Championship qualification	19 September 2011
Alexia Putellas	Estonia	16–0	UEFA Women's u19 Championship qualification	20 October 2012
Laura Ortiz ^{4}	Estonia	16–0	UEFA Women's u19 Championship qualification	20 October 2012
Mariona Caldentey ^{4}	Belarus	10–0	UEFA Women's u19 Championship qualification	7 April 2014
Andrea Falcón	Croatia	7–0	UEFA Women's u19 Championship qualification	13 September 2014
Mariona Caldentey	Lithuania	0–14	UEFA Women's u19 Championship qualification	15 September 2014
Pilar Garrote ^{4}	Lithuania	0–14	UEFA Women's u19 Championship qualification	15 September 2014
Andrea Falcón	Lithuania	0–14	UEFA Women's u19 Championship qualification	15 September 2014
Sandra Hernández	Netherlands	4–3	UEFA Women's u19 Championship qualification	28 July 2016
Aitana Bonmati	Latvia	18–0	UEFA Women's u19 Championship qualification	15 September 2016
Lucía García ^{4}	Latvia	18–0	UEFA Women's u19 Championship qualification	15 September 2016
Maite Oroz	Latvia	18–0	UEFA Women's u19 Championship qualification	15 September 2016
Andrea Sierra	Azerbaijan	7–0	UEFA Women's u19 Championship qualification	17 September 2016
Clàudia Pina ^{4}	Hungary	7–0	UEFA Women's u19 Championship qualification	6 April 2019
Eva Navarro	Kazakhstan	14–0	UEFA Women's u19 Championship qualification	2 October 2019
Aixa Salvador	Kazakhstan	14–0	UEFA Women's u19 Championship qualification	2 October 2019
Mirari Uria	Czech Republic	3–1	UEFA Women's u19 Championship qualification	25 October 2021
Fiamma Benítez ^{4}	Romania	9–0	UEFA Women's u19 Championship qualification	6 April 2022
Carmen Álvarez	Portugal	6–0	UEFA Women's u19 Championship qualification	9 April 2022

^{4} Player scored 4 goals
^{5} Player scored 5 goals
^{6} Player scored 6 goals

== See also ==
Spain women's national football team
Spain women's national under-20 football team
Spain women's national under-17 football team
