= 2022 UEFA Women's Under-19 Championship =

Mistrovství Evropy ve fotbale žen do 19 let 2022

Tournament details
- Host country: Czech Republic
- Dates: 27 June – 9 July
- Teams: 8 (from 1 confederation)
- Venue: 5 (in 4 host cities)

Final positions
- Champions: Spain (4th title)
- Runners-up: Norway

Tournament statistics
- Matches played: 15
- Goals scored: 42 (2.8 per match)
- Top scorer(s): (Italy) Nicole Arcangeli (5 goals)

The 2022 UEFA Women's Under-19 Championship (also known as UEFA Women's Under-19 Euro 2022) was the 19th edition of the UEFA Women's Under-19 Championship (23rd edition if the Under-18 era is included), the annual international youth football championship organised by UEFA for the women's under-19 national teams of Europe. The Czech Republic hosted the tournament. A total of eight teams played in the tournament, with players born on or after 1 January 2003 eligible to participate.

France were the defending champions, having won the last tournament held in 2019, with the 2020 and 2021 editions cancelled due to the COVID-19 pandemic in Europe. France was eliminated in the semifinals.

== Host selection ==
The timeline of host selection was as follows:

- 11 January 2019: bidding procedure launched
- 28 February 2019: deadline to express interest
- 27 March 2019: Announcement by UEFA that declaration of interest were received from 17 member associations to host one of the UEFA national team youth final tournaments (UEFA European Under-19 Championship, UEFA Women's Under-19 Championship, UEFA European Under-17 Championship, UEFA Women's Under-17 Championship) in 2021 and 2022 (although it was not specified which association were interested in which tournament)
- 28 June 2019: Submission of bid dossiers
- 24 September 2019: Selection of successful host associations by the UEFA Executive Committee at its meeting in Ljubljana

For the UEFA European Women's Under-19 Championship final tournaments of 2021 and 2022, Belarus and Czech Republic were selected as hosts respectively.

== Qualification ==
The UEFA Executive Committee approved on 18 June 2020 a new qualifying format for the Women's Under-17 and Under-19 Championship starting from 2022. The qualifying competition will be played in two rounds, with teams divided into two leagues, and promotion and relegation between leagues after each round similar to the UEFA Nations League.

A record total of 52 (out of 55) UEFA nations entered the qualifying competition, with the hosts Czech Republic also competing despite already qualifying automatically, and seven teams will qualify for the final tournament at the end of round 2 to join the hosts. The draw for round 1 was held on 11 March 2021, 15:00 CET (UTC+1), at the UEFA headquarters in Nyon, Switzerland.

=== Qualified teams ===
The following eight teams qualified for the final tournament.

| Team | Qualified as | Qualified on | Previous appearances in Under-19 Euro^{1} only U-19 era (since 2002) |
|---|---|---|---|
| Czech Republic | Hosts | 24 September 2019 | 0 (debut) |
| Germany | Round 2 Group A2 winners | 12 April 2022 | 16 (**2002**, 2003, 2004, 2005, **2006**, **2007**, 2008, 2009, 2010, **2011**, 2013, 2015, 2016, 2017, 2018, 2019) |
| England | Round 2 Group A3 winners | 12 April 2022 | 13 (2002, 2003, 2005, 2007, 2008, **2009**, 2010, 2012, 2013, 2014, 2015, 2017, 2019) |
| Sweden | Round 2 Group A1 winners | 12 April 2022 | 9 (2002, 2003, 2006, 2008, 2009, **2012**, 2013, 2014, **2015**) |
| Norway | Round 2 Group A4 winners | 16 May 2022 | 13 (2002, 2003, 2004, 2007, 2008, 2009, 2011, 2013, 2014, 2015, 2016, 2018, 2019) |
| Italy | Round 2 Group A5 winners | 12 April 2022 | 7 (2003, 2004, **2008**, 2010, 2011, 2017, 2018) |
| Spain | Round 2 Group A6 winners | 12 April 2022 | 14 (2002, 2003, **2004**, 2007, 2008, 2010, 2011, 2012, 2014, 2015, 2016, **2017**, **2018**, 2019) |
| France | Round 2 Group A7 winners | 12 April 2022 | 15 (2002, **2003**, 2004, 2005, 2006, 2007, 2008, 2009, **2010**, **2013**, 2015, **2016**, 2017, 2018, **2019**) |

^{1} Bold indicates champions for that year. Italic indicates hosts for that year.

=== Final draw ===
The final draw was held on 18 May 2022, 10:30 CET, at Clarion Congress Hotel in Ostrava, the Czech Republic. The eight teams were drawn into two groups of four teams. There were no seeding, except that the hosts Czech Republic were assigned to position A1 in the draw.

== Venues ==
| Frýdek-Místek | Karviná | The Moravian-Silesian Region in the Czech Republic | 2022 UEFA Women's Under-19 Championship is located in Moravian-Silesian Region | Opava | Ostrava | |
|---|---|---|---|---|---|---|
| Stadion Stovky | Městský Stadion | The Moravian-Silesian Region in the Czech Republic | 2022 UEFA Women's Under-19 Championship is located in Moravian-Silesian Region | Mestský Fotbalovy Stadion | Městský Stadion | Stadion Bazaly |
| Capacity: 2,400 | Capacity: 4,833 | The Moravian-Silesian Region in the Czech Republic | 2022 UEFA Women's Under-19 Championship is located in Moravian-Silesian Region | Capacity: 7,758 | Capacity: 15,123 | Capacity: 10,039 |

== Squads ==
Each national team have to submit a squad of 20 players, two of whom had to be goalkeepers (Regulations Article 43.01).

== Group stage ==
The group winners and runners-up advanced to the semi-finals.

Tiebreakers

In the group stage, teams were ranked according to points (3 points for a win, 1 point for a draw, 0 points for a loss), and if tied on points, the following tiebreaking criteria were applied, in the order given, to determine the rankings (Regulations Articles 20.01 and 20.02):

1. Points in head-to-head matches among tied teams;
2. Goal difference in head-to-head matches among tied teams;
3. Goals scored in head-to-head matches among tied teams;
4. If more than two teams were tied, and after applying all head-to-head criteria above, a subset of teams were still tied, all head-to-head criteria above were reapplied exclusively to that subset of teams;
5. Goal difference in all group matches;
6. Goals scored in all group matches;
7. Penalty shoot-out if only two teams had the same number of points, and they met in the last round of the group and were tied after applying all criteria above (not used if more than two teams had the same number of points, or if their rankings were not relevant for qualification for the next stage);
8. Disciplinary points (red card = 3 points, yellow card = 1 point, expulsion for two yellow cards in one match = 3 points);
9. Higher position in the qualification round 2 league ranking

All times are local, CEST (UTC+2).

=== Group A ===
| Pos | Team | Pld | W | D | L | GF | GA | GD | Pts | Qualification |
|---|---|---|---|---|---|---|---|---|---|---|
| 1 | Spain | 3 | 2 | 1 | 0 | 9 | 2 | +7 | 7 | Knockout stage |
| 2 | France | 3 | 1 | 2 | 0 | 6 | 3 | +3 | 5 | Knockout stage |
| 3 | Italy | 3 | 1 | 1 | 1 | 7 | 5 | +2 | 4 | |
| 4 | Czech Republic (H) | 3 | 0 | 0 | 3 | 0 | 12 | −12 | 0 | |

Source: UEFA
Rules for classification: Group stage tiebreakers
(H) Hosts
27 June 2022
11:00

| Czech Republic | 0–3 | France |
|---|---|---|
| | Report | Coquet 21'; Benyahia 45+1'; Mouchon 90+2' |

Městský Stadion, Ostrava
Referee: Katalin Sipos (Hungary)
27 June 2022
17:30

| Spain | 3–1 | Italy |
|---|---|---|
| Vignola 29'; Álvarez 45+3'; Uria 61' | Report | Arcangeli 24' (pen.) |

Mestský Fotbalovy Stadion, Opava
Referee: Lizzy van der Helm (Netherlands)

30 June 2022
15:00

| Italy | 2–2 | France |
|---|---|---|
| Arcangeli 45+3' (pen.), 88' (pen.) | Report | Coquet 65'; Ribadeira 69' |

Stadion Bazaly, Ostrava
Referee: Jelena Pejković (Croatia)
30 June 2022
17:30

| Czech Republic | 0–5 | Spain |
|---|---|---|
| | Report | Elexpuru 23'; Benítez 37'; Pinedo 47'; Moral 69', 76' |

Mestský Fotbalovy Stadion, Opava
Referee: Katarzyna Lisiecka-Sęk (Poland)

3 July 2022
17:30

| Italy | 4–0 | Czech Republic |
|---|---|---|
| Arcangeli 3', 59'; Beccari 20'; Della Peruta 90+4' | Report |

Stadion Stovky, Frýdek-Místek
Referee: Alina Peşu (Romania)
3 July 2022
17:30

| France | 1–1 | Spain |
|---|---|---|
| Bahlouli 31' | Report | Lloris 29' |

Stadion Bazaly, Ostrava
Referee: Catarina Campos (Portugal)

=== Group B ===
| Pos | Team | Pld | W | D | L | GF | GA | GD | Pts | Qualification |
|---|---|---|---|---|---|---|---|---|---|---|
| 1 | Norway | 3 | 2 | 0 | 1 | 4 | 5 | −1 | 6 (Note: Head-to-head points: Norway 3, Sweden 0.) | Knockout stage |
| 2 | Sweden | 3 | 2 | 0 | 1 | 3 | 1 | +2 | 6 | Knockout stage |
| 3 | Germany | 3 | 1 | 0 | 2 | 4 | 4 | 0 | 3 (Note: Head-to-head points: Germany 3, England 0.) | |
| 4 | England | 3 | 1 | 0 | 2 | 4 | 5 | −1 | 3 | |

Source: UEFA
Rules for classification: Group stage tiebreakers
Notes:
27 June 2022
15:00

| Sweden | 2–0 | Germany |
|---|---|---|
| Vinberg 29', 37' | Report |

Stadion Stovky, Frýdek-Místek
Referee: Catarina Campos (Portugal)
27 June 2022
17:30

| England | 4–1 | Norway |
|---|---|---|
| Beever-Jones 17', 71'; Fox 51'; Clinton 90' | Report | Tandberg 37' |

Městský Stadion, Karviná
Referee: Katarzyna Lisiecka-Sęk (Poland)

30 June 2022
15:00

| Norway | 2–1 | Germany |
|---|---|---|
| Omarsdottir 57', 83' | Report | Mattner-Trembleau 10' |

Městský Stadion, Karviná
Referee: Alina Peşu (Romania)
30 June 2022
17:30

| Sweden | 1–0 | England |
|---|---|---|
| Nelhage 7' | Report |

Stadion Stovky, Frýdek-Místek
Referee: Katalin Sipos (Hungary)

3 July 2022
20:00

| Norway | 1–0 | Sweden |
|---|---|---|
| Johansen 77' | Report |

Mestský Fotbalovy Stadion, Opava
Referee: Lizzy van der Helm (Netherlands)
3 July 2022
20:00

| Germany | 3–0 | England |
|---|---|---|
| Mattner-Trembleau 44', 90+5'; Zdebel 87' | Report |

Městský Stadion, Karviná
Referee: Jelena Pejković (Croatia)

== Knockout stage ==
In the knockout stage, extra time and penalty shoot-out will be used to decide the winner if necessary.

=== Bracket ===
Semi-finals
6 July – Opava
Spain | 1
Sweden | 0
6 July – Karviná
Norway | 1
France | 0

Final
9 July – Ostrava
Spain | 2
Norway | 1

=== Semi-finals ===
6 July 2022
15:00

| Spain | 1–0 | Sweden |
|---|---|---|
| Uria 51' | Report |

Mestský Fotbalovy Stadion, Opava
Referee: Catarina Campos (Portugal)

6 July 2022
17:30

| Norway | 1–0 | France |
|---|---|---|
| Sévenne 52' (o.g.) | Report |

Městský Stadion, Karviná
Referee: Lizzy van der Helm (Netherlands)

=== Final ===
9 July 2022
15:00

| Spain | 2–1 | Norway |
|---|---|---|
| Elexpuru 36'; Bartel 90+4' | Report | Omarsdottir 5' |

Městský Stadion, Ostrava
Referee: Alina Peşu (Romania)

== Goalscorers ==
There were 42 goals scored in 15 matches, for an average of 2.8 goals per match.

5 goals

- (Italy) Nicole Arcangeli

3 goals

- (Germany) Sarah Mattner-Trembleau
- (Norway) Iris Omarsdottir

2 goals

- (England) Aggie Beever-Jones
- (France) Judith Coquet
- (Spain) Ane Elexpuru
- (Spain) Lucía Moral
- (Spain) Mirari Uria
- (Sweden) Matilda Vinberg

1 goal

- (England) Grace Clinton
- (England) Jorja Fox
- (France) Nesrine Bahlouli
- (France) Inès Benyahia
- (France) Noémie Mouchon
- (France) Louna Ribadeira
- (Germany) Sofie Zdebel
- (Italy) Chiara Beccari
- (Italy) Victoria Della Peruta
- (Norway) Oda Mathilde Johansen
- (Norway) Cathinka Tandberg
- (Spain) Carmen Álvarez
- (Spain) Júlia Bartel
- (Spain) Fiamma Benítez
- (Spain) Silvia Lloris
- (Spain) Clara Pinedo
- (Spain) Ornella Vignola
- (Sweden) Elma Nelhage

1 own goal

- (France) Éloïse Sévenne (against Norway)
