= Spain women's national under-20 football team =

Spain Women's U-20
- Association: Royal Spanish Football Federation
- Confederation: UEFA (Europe)
- Head coach: David Aznar
- Captain: Jana Fernández
- Top scorer: Patricia Guijarro (7)
- FIFA code: ESP
First colours	Second colours

UEFA Women's Under-19 Championship
- Appearances: 19 (first in 2002)
- Best result: Champions (2004, 2017, 2018, 2022, 2023, 2024, 2025, 2026)

FIFA U-20 Women's World Cup
- Appearances: 5 (first in 2004)
- Best result: Champions (2022, 2026)

The Spain women's national under-20 football team represents Spain in international football in under-20 categories and is controlled by the Royal Spanish Football Federation.

== Fixtures and results ==
Legend

Win Draw Lose Fixture

== Players ==
=== Current squad ===
The following players were called up for the 2024 FIFA U-20 Women's World Cup

Caps and goals as of 15 September 2024

No.	Pos.	Player	Date of birth (age)	Caps	Goals	Club
1	GK	Sofía Fuente	14 March 2005 (age 21)	4	0	(Royal Spanish Football Federation) Real Madrid
21	GK	Eunate Astralaga	30 November 2005 (age 20)	4	0	(Royal Spanish Football Federation) Athletic Club
13	GK	Andrea Tarazona	21 March 2004 (age 22)	2	0	(Royal Spanish Football Federation) Levante
8	DF	Silvia Lloris	15 May 2004 (age 22)	15	1	(Royal Spanish Football Federation) Atlético Madrid
5	DF	Sandra Villafañe	18 September 2005 (age 21)	8	0	(Royal Spanish Football Federation) Madrid CFF
15	DF	Sara Ortega	20 February 2005 (age 21)	7	0	(Royal Spanish Football Federation) Athletic Club
2	DF	Judit Pujols	25 February 2005 (age 21)	7	0	(Royal Spanish Football Federation) FC Barcelona
12	DF	Aïcha Cámara	11 December 2006 (age 19)	5	0	(Royal Spanish Football Federation) FC Barcelona
3	DF	Estela Carbonell	18 October 2004 (age 22)	4	0	(Royal Spanish Football Federation) Levante
6	MF	Maite Zubieta	28 May 2004 (age 22)	14	0	(Royal Spanish Football Federation) Athletic Club
10	MF	Júlia Bartel	18 May 2004 (age 22)	14	0	(The Football Association) Chelsea
16	MF	Olaya Enrique	10 May 2005 (age 21)	7	2	(Royal Spanish Football Federation) Deportivo La Coruña
4	MF	Nahia Aparicio	24 October 2004 (age 22)	7	1	(Royal Spanish Football Federation) Real Sociedad
20	MF	Érika González	31 August 2004 (age 22)	6	0	(Royal Spanish Football Federation) Levante
14	MF	Marina Artero	24 October 2005 (age 21)	5	0	(Royal Spanish Football Federation) Deportivo La Coruña
7	FW	Ornella Vignola	30 September 2004 (age 22)	13	0	(Royal Spanish Football Federation) Granada
9	FW	Jone Amezaga	2 January 2005 (age 21)	8	4	(Royal Spanish Football Federation) Athletic Club
17	FW	Lucía Corrales	24 November 2005 (age 20)	8	0	(Royal Spanish Football Federation) Sevilla
18	FW	Lucía Moral	11 February 2004 (age 22)	7	2	(Royal Spanish Football Federation) Sevilla
19	FW	Laia Martret	28 August 2005 (age 21)	4	1	(Royal Spanish Football Federation) FC Barcelona
11	FW	Ona Baradad	31 August 2004 (age 22)	4	0	(Royal Spanish Football Federation) FC Barcelona

=== Recent call-ups ===
Pos.	Player	Date of birth (age)	Caps	Goals	Club	Latest call-up

=== Previous rosters ===
- 2004 FIFA U-19 Women's World Championship squad
- 2016 FIFA U-20 Women's World Championship squad
- 2018 FIFA U-20 Women's World Championship squad
- 2022 FIFA U-20 Women's World Championship squad

== Statistics ==
=== Most appearances ===
#	Name	Career	Caps	Goals
1	Patricia Guijarro	2016–2018	10	7
1	Carmen Menayo	2016–2018	10	1
3	Aitana Bonmatí	2016–2018	9	2
3	Maite Oroz	2016–2018	9	0
5	Laia Aleixandri	2018–2019	6	0
5	Candela Andújar	2018	6	1
5	Catalina Coll	2018	6	0
5	Damaris Egurrola	2018	6	0
5	Lucía García	2016–2018	6	4
5	Eva Navarro	2018–2019	6	0
5	Berta Pujadas	2018	6	0

=== Top goalscorers ===
#	Player	Career	Goals	Caps
1	Patricia Guijarro	2016–2018	7	10
2	Lucía García	2016–2018	4	6
3	Mariona Caldentey	2016	2	4
3	Aitana Bonmatí	2016–2018	2	9
5	Alba Redondo	2016	1	2
5	Nahikari García	2016	1	4
5	Clàudia Pina	2018–2023	1	5
5	Candela Andújar	2018–2022	1	6
5	Carmen Menayo	2016–2018	1	10

=== Hat-tricks ===
Player	Against	Result	Competition	Date
Patricia Guijarro	Paraguay under-20	1–4	2018 FIFA U-20 Women's World Cup	6 August 2018

== Competitive record ==
=== FIFA U-20 Women's World Cup ===
Year	Round	Pld	W	D*	L	GF	GA
(Canada) 2002	Did not qualify						
(Thailand) 2004	Group stage	3	1	0	2	3	6
(Russia) 2006	Did not qualify						
(Chile) 2008	Did not qualify						
(Germany) 2010	Did not qualify						
(Japan) 2012	Did not qualify						
(Canada) 2014	Did not qualify						
(Papua New Guinea) 2016	Quarter-finals	4	2	0	2	9	5
(France) 2018	Runners-up	6	4	1	1	11	7
(Costa Rica) 2022	Champions	6	5	1	0	14	2
(Colombia) 2024	Quarter-finals	5	4	0	1	7	2
(Poland) 2026	Champions	7	6	1	0	21	1
Total	6/12	31	22	3	6	65	23

* Draws include knockout matches decided via penalty shoot-out.

== See also ==
- Spain women's national football team
- Spain women's national under-19 football team
- Spain women's national under-17 football team

== Head-to-head record ==
The following table shows Spain's head-to-head record in the FIFA U-20 Women's World Cup.

Opponent	Pld	W	D	L	GF	GA	GD	Win %
Australia	1	1	0	0	3	0	+3	100.00
Brazil	2	1	1	0	1	0	+1	50.00
Canada	2	2	0	0	7	1	+6	100.00
China	1	1	0	0	3	1	+2	100.00
Costa Rica	1	1	0	0	5	0	+5	100.00
France	1	1	0	0	1	0	+1	100.00
Italy	1	1	0	0	2	0	+2	100.00
Japan	5	3	0	2	6	5	+1	60.00
Mexico	1	1	0	0	1	0	+1	100.00
Morocco	1	1	0	0	2	0	+2	100.00
Netherlands	1	1	0	0	2	1	+1	100.00
New Caledonia	1	1	0	0	11	0	+11	100.00
Nigeria	3	2	0	1	5	3	+2	66.67
North Korea	2	0	1	1	2	3	−1	0.00
Paraguay	2	2	0	0	6	1	+5	100.00
Portugal	1	1	0	0	2	0	+2	100.00
Russia	1	0	0	1	1	4	−3	0.00
South Korea	1	1	0	0	2	1	+1	100.00
United States	3	1	1	1	3	3	+0	33.33
Total	31	22	3	6	65	23	+42	70.97
