= Spain women's national under-23 football team =

Spain U-23
- Association: Royal Spanish Football Federation
- Captain: Bruna Vilamala
First colours	Second colours

First international
- Italy 1–4 Spain (Florence, Italy; 21 October 2021)

Biggest win
- Portugal 0–6 Spain (Melgaço, Portugal; 25 October 2021)

The Spain women's national under-23 football team, also known as Spain B or España Promesas ('Spain Promises'), is the national representative Women's association football team of Spain at under-23 age level, and is controlled by the Royal Spanish Football Federation, the governing body of football in Spain.

A squad first convened for assessment and training in October 2019, without playing any matches.

== Players ==
=== Current players ===
- The following players were called up for friendly match against Belgium on 17 February 2022.
- The following players were also named to a squad in the last 12 months.

Pos.	Player	Date of birth (age)	Caps	Goals	Club	Latest call-up
GK	Gemma Font	23 October 1999 (age 27)	0	1	FC Barcelona Femení	v. Portugal; 25 October 2021
DF	María Méndez	10 April 2001 (age 25)	2	1	Levante	v. Portugal; 25 October 2021
MF	Laurina Gutiérrez	18 April 2000 (age 26)	0	0	Real Betis	v. Norway; 29 November 2021
MF	Olga Carmona	12 June 2000 (age 26)	2	0	Real Madrid	v. Portugal; 25 October 2021
FW	Ainhoa Marín	21 March 2001 (age 25)	1	0	Deportivo	v. Norway; 29 November 2021
FW	Lorena Navarro	11 November 2000 (age 26)	2	0	Real Madrid	v. Norway; 29 November 2021
FW	Bruna Vilamala	4 June 2002 (age 24)	0	0	FC Barcelona Femení	v. Portugal; 25 October 2021
