= 2023 UEFA Women's Under-19 Championship squads =

Player listing of women's football competition

This article describes about the squads for the 2023 UEFA Women's Under-19 Championship.

== Group A ==
=== Austria ===
Head coach: Hannes Spilka

The final 21-women squad was revealed on 10 July 2023. Naika Reissner was replaced by Livia Pertl due to a knee injury.

No.	Pos.	Player	Date of birth (age)	Club
1	GK	Mariella El Sherif	2 September 2004 (aged 18)	(Austria) SK Sturm Graz
21	GK	Larissa Rusek	1 January 2005 (aged 18)	(Austria) SV Neulengbach
3	DF	Lainie Fuchs	4 January 2004 (aged 19)	(United States) Pittsburgh Panthers
4	DF	Isabell Schneiderbauer	28 April 2004 (aged 19)	(Austria) First Vienna FC
5	DF	Jovana Čavić	17 June 2004 (aged 19)	(Austria) First Vienna FC
9	DF	Tatjana Weiss	13 January 2004 (aged 19)	(Austria) SV Neulengbach
14	DF	Chiara D'Angelo	31 July 2004 (aged 18)	(Austria) SKN St. Pölten
16	DF	Nadine Seidl	3 May 2004 (aged 19)	(Austria) First Vienna FC
17	DF	Laura Spinn	7 February 2005 (aged 18)	(Austria) SV Neulengbach
6	MF	Anna Holl	22 March 2004 (aged 19)	(United States) Jacksonville State Gamecocks
8	MF	Emilia Purtscher	26 July 2005 (aged 17)	(Austria) FFC Vorderland
11	MF	Magdalena Rukavina	19 January 2005 (aged 18)	(Austria) SV Neulengbach
12	DF	Livia Pertl	15 March 2004 (aged 19)	(United States) William Carey University
15	MF	Julia Keutz	18 March 2004 (aged 19)	(Austria) SK Sturm Graz
19	MF	Nicole Ojukwu	28 November 2005 (aged 17)	(Austria) First Vienna FC
7	FW	Isabel Aistleitner	21 January 2005 (aged 18)	(Austria) First Vienna FC
10	FW	Amelie Roduner	9 March 2005 (aged 18)	(Germany) FC Bayern Munich
13	FW	Valentina Mädl	18 December 2005 (aged 17)	(Austria) SKN St. Pölten
18	FW	Linda Natter	12 May 2005 (aged 18)	(Austria) FFC Vorderland
20	FW	Anna Wirnsberger	8 December 2004 (aged 18)	(Austria) SK Sturm Graz

=== Belgium ===
Head coach: Xavier Donnay

The final 20-women squad was revealed on 12 July 2023.

No.	Pos.	Player	Date of birth (age)	Club
1	GK	Jorijn Covent	30 August 2004 (aged 18)	(Belgium) Club YLA
12	GK	Lise Musique	1 February 2005 (aged 18)	(Belgium) Standard Liège
2	DF	Amy Littel	15 April 2005 (aged 18)	(Belgium) KVC Westerlo
3	DF	Loredana Humartus	18 March 2004 (aged 19)	(Belgium) Standard Liège
4	DF	Nia Elyn	30 May 2004 (aged 19)	(Belgium) KAA Gent
5	DF	Ines Van Gansbeke	23 February 2005 (aged 18)	(Belgium) KAA Gent
17	DF	Caitlin Lievens	5 February 2005 (aged 18)	(Belgium) Club YLA
20	DF	Luna Vanhoudt	10 April 2004 (aged 19)	(Belgium) KRC Genk
6	MF	Karlijn Helsen	20 February 2004 (aged 19)	(Belgium) Oud-Heverlee Leuven
7	MF	Alixe Bosteels	29 May 2004 (aged 19)	(Belgium) KAA Gent
8	MF	Marie Detruyer	13 January 2004 (aged 19)	(Belgium) Oud-Heverlee Leuven
10	MF	Valesca Ampoorter	5 March 2004 (aged 19)	(Belgium) Oud-Heverlee Leuven
15	MF	Nadège François	3 May 2005 (aged 18)	(Belgium) Standard Liège
19	MF	Enora Mattè	15 April 2004 (aged 19)	(Belgium) Standard Liège
9	FW	Lore Jacobs	27 April 2005 (aged 18)	(Belgium) RSC Anderlecht
11	FW	Véronique Zang Bikoula	14 January 2005 (aged 18)	(Belgium) RSC Anderlecht
13	FW	Rania Boutiebi	4 March 2004 (aged 19)	(Belgium) Club YLA
14	FW	Marine Rosala	10 January 2004 (aged 19)	(Belgium) Standard Liège
16	FW	Thirsa De Meester	9 October 2006 (aged 16)	(Belgium) KRC Genk
18	FW	Anisa Ademi	26 June 2006 (aged 17)	(Belgium) Standard Liège

=== Germany ===
Head coach: Kathrin Peter

The final 20-women squad was revealed on 5 July 2023.

No.	Pos.	Player	Date of birth (age)	Club
1	GK	Rebecca Adamczyk	3 April 2005 (aged 18)	(Germany) SC Freiburg
12	GK	Anne Moll	6 April 2005 (aged 18)	(Germany) Bayer Leverkusen
2	DF	Nia Szenk	5 May 2004 (aged 19)	(Switzerland) FC Basel
3	DF	Dilara Açıkgöz	2 June 2004 (aged 19)	(Germany) Eintracht Frankfurt
4	DF	Laura Pucks	1 April 2004 (aged 19)	(Germany) SGS Essen
5	MF	Vanessa Diehm	22 March 2004 (aged 19)	(Germany) TSG Hoffenheim
13	DF	Miriam Hils	11 March 2004 (aged 19)	(United States) California Golden Bears
14	DF	Alina Axtmann	25 June 2005 (aged 18)	(Germany) SC Freiburg
15	DF	Jella Veit	3 May 2005 (aged 18)	(Germany) Eintracht Frankfurt
6	MF	Mathilde Janzen	14 February 2005 (aged 18)	(Germany) TSG Hoffenheim
7	MF	Sophie Nachtigall	12 April 2004 (aged 19)	(Germany) Eintracht Frankfurt
8	MF	İlayda Açıkgöz	2 June 2004 (aged 19)	(Germany) Eintracht Frankfurt
9	MF	Mara Alber	6 September 2005 (aged 17)	(Germany) TSG Hoffenheim
10	MF	Alara Şehitler	27 November 2006 (aged 16)	(Germany) Bayern Munich
16	MF	Paulina Platner	16 November 2005 (aged 17)	(Germany) Eintracht Frankfurt
17	MF	Paulina Bartz	9 May 2005 (aged 18)	(Germany) Bayer Leverkusen
19	MF	Alisa Grincenco	14 February 2004 (aged 19)	(Germany) Turbine Potsdam
11	FW	Franziska Kett	24 October 2004 (aged 18)	(Germany) Bayern Munich
18	FW	Pauline Deutsch	29 September 2004 (aged 18)	(Germany) Turbine Potsdam
20	FW	Laura Gloning	5 June 2005 (aged 18)	(Germany) Bayern Munich

=== Netherlands ===
Head coach: Roos Kwakkenbos

The final 20-women squad was revealed on 6 July 2023.

No.	Pos.	Player	Date of birth (age)	Club
1	GK	Femke Liefting	2 January 2005 (aged 18)	(Netherlands) AZ Alkmaar
16	GK	Roos van Eijk	15 October 2005 (aged 17)	(Italy) AC Milan
3	DF	Djoeke de Ridder	21 August 2005 (aged 17)	(Netherlands) AZ Alkmaar
4	DF	Isa Kardinaal	31 March 2005 (aged 18)	(Netherlands) AFC Ajax
5	DF	Daliyah de Klonia	18 March 2005 (aged 18)	(Netherlands) AFC Ajax
12	DF	Emma Frijns	25 February 2005 (aged 18)	(Netherlands) PSV
13	DF	Renee van Asten	7 October 2006 (aged 16)	(Netherlands) AFC Ajax
14	DF	Veerle Buurman	21 April 2006 (aged 17)	(Netherlands) PSV
2	MF	Louise van Oosten	2 July 2004 (aged 19)	(Netherlands) ADO Den Haag
6	MF	Rosa van Gool	9 February 2004 (aged 19)	(Netherlands) AFC Ajax
8	MF	Robine Lacroix	2 June 2005 (aged 18)	(Netherlands) PSV
10	MF	Danique Noordman	21 February 2004 (aged 19)	(Netherlands) PEC Zwolle
15	MF	Kealyn Thomas	27 July 2005 (aged 17)	(Netherlands) PSV
18	MF	Nayomi Buikema	5 May 2004 (aged 19)	(Netherlands) PEC Zwolle
7	FW	Lotte Keukelaar	25 September 2005 (aged 17)	(Netherlands) AFC Ajax
9	FW	Hanna Huizenga	4 July 2005 (aged 18)	(Netherlands) Fortuna Sittard
11	FW	Ziva Henry	31 May 2004 (aged 19)	(Netherlands) Feyenoord
17	FW	Shi-jona Martina	14 November 2004 (aged 18)	(Netherlands) PSV
19	FW	Danique Tolhoek	17 March 2005 (aged 18)	(Netherlands) AFC Ajax
20	FW	Fieke Kroese	7 February 2005 (aged 18)	(Netherlands) FC Twente

== Group B ==
=== Czech Republic ===
Head coach: Jan Navrátil

The final 20-women squad was revealed on 30 June 2023.

No.	Pos.	Player	Date of birth (age)	Club
1	GK	Zuzana Kožuriková	18 June 2006 (aged 17)	(Czech Republic) AC Sparta Prague
16	GK	Vanesa Jílková	23 August 2005 (aged 17)	(Czech Republic) Lokomotiva Brno HH
2	DF	Nikola Pražienková	25 July 2004 (aged 18)	(Czech Republic) FK Dukla Prague
3	DF	Anna Bárková	17 May 2005 (aged 18)	(Czech Republic) AC Sparta Prague
4	DF	Zuzana Obadalová	14 January 2005 (aged 18)	(Czech Republic) 1. FC Slovácko
5	DF	Natálie Trčková	6 February 2004 (aged 19)	(Czech Republic) 1. FC Slovácko
11	DF	Klára Bláhová	24 August 2004 (aged 18)	(Czech Republic) 1. FC Slovácko
15	DF	Vendula Polášková	21 October 2005 (aged 17)	(Czech Republic) 1. FC Slovácko
18	DF	Aneta Svobodová	18 June 2005 (aged 18)	(Czech Republic) AC Sparta Prague
22	DF	Barbora Mrázková	20 April 2005 (aged 18)	(Czech Republic) SK Slavia Prague
6	MF	Denisa Tenkrátová	1 November 2004 (aged 18)	(Czech Republic) SK Slavia Prague
8	MF	Andrea Kochanová	11 February 2004 (aged 19)	(Czech Republic) FC Viktoria Plzeň
9	MF	Albina Goretkiová	3 August 2005 (aged 17)	(Czech Republic) SK Slavia Prague
13	MF	Monika Hlaváčová	13 October 2005 (aged 17)	(Czech Republic) 1. FC Slovácko
14	MF	Lucie Bendová	3 April 2005 (aged 18)	(Czech Republic) SK Slavia Prague
20	MF	Radka Hlouchová	25 January 2004 (aged 19)	(Czech Republic) FK Dukla Prague
7	FW	Klára Ducháčková	26 May 2004 (aged 19)	(Czech Republic) AC Sparta Prague
10	FW	Tereza Černá	8 April 2004 (aged 19)	(Czech Republic) FC Slovan Liberec
17	FW	Andrea Švíbková	10 July 2004 (aged 19)	(Czech Republic) AC Sparta Prague
19	FW	Julie Freislerová	24 July 2005 (aged 17)	(Czech Republic) SK Slavia Prague

=== France ===
Head coach: Sandrine Ringler

The final 20-women squad was revealed on 8 July 2023.

No.	Pos.	Player	Date of birth (age)	Club
1	GK	Inès Marques	25 March 2004 (aged 19)	(France) Paris FC
16	GK	Féerine Belhadj	14 February 2005 (aged 18)	(France) Olympique Lyonnais
2	DF	Marion Haelewyn	30 October 2004 (aged 18)	(France) FC Girondins de Bordeaux
3	DF	Lou Bogaert	25 June 2004 (aged 19)	(France) Paris FC
4	DF	Thiniba Samoura	11 February 2004 (aged 19)	(France) Paris FC
5	DF	Hillary Diaz	24 July 2004 (aged 18)	(France) FC Girondins de Bordeaux
12	DF	Fiona Liaigre	5 January 2005 (aged 18)	(France) FC Girondins de Bordeaux
13	DF	Pauline Sierra	13 March 2004 (aged 19)	(France) Olympique Lyonnais
14	DF	Alice Marques	4 May 2005 (aged 18)	(France) Olympique Lyonnais
6	MF	Kysha Sylla	4 February 2004 (aged 19)	(France) Olympique Lyonnais
8	MF	Chloé Neller	13 May 2004 (aged 19)	(France) Paris FC
10	MF	Aïrine Fontaine	20 August 2004 (aged 18)	(France) FC Fleury 91
15	MF	Maëlle Seguin	18 July 2004 (aged 19)	(France) FC Girondins de Bordeaux
17	MF	Baby Jordy Benera	24 May 2004 (aged 19)	(France) Paris Saint-Germain
7	FW	Pauline Haugou	29 September 2004 (aged 18)	(France) RC Strasbourg Alsace
9	FW	Louna Ribadeira	18 August 2004 (aged 18)	(France) Paris FC
11	FW	Tara Elimbi Gilbert	9 June 2005 (aged 18)	(France) Paris Saint-Germain
18	FW	Shana Chossenotte	14 February 2005 (aged 18)	(France) Stade de Reims
19	FW	Dona Scannapieco	6 June 2004 (aged 19)	(France) Montpellier HSC
20	FW	Fanny Rossi	8 November 2005 (aged 17)	(France) Paris Saint-Germain

=== Iceland ===
Head coach: Margrét Magnúsdóttir

The final 20-women squad was revealed on 23 June 2023. Aldís Guðlaugsdóttir was replaced by Kimberley Hjálmarsdóttir and Elísa Sigurjónsdóttir was replaced by Ísabella Tryggvadóttir.

No.	Pos.	Player	Date of birth (age)	Club
1	GK	Tinna Magnúsdóttir	28 June 2004 (aged 19)	(Iceland) Fylkir
12	GK	Fanney Birkisdóttir	17 March 2005 (aged 18)	(Iceland) Valur
3	DF	Jakobína Hjörvarsdóttir	18 July 2004 (aged 19)	(Iceland) Þór/KA
4	DF	Hildur Búadóttir	29 May 2004 (aged 19)	(Iceland) Valur
5	DF	Eyrún Hjartardóttir	25 May 2005 (aged 18)	(Iceland) Stjarnan
6	DF	Mikaela Pétursdóttir	20 February 2004 (aged 19)	(Iceland) Keflavík ÍF
16	DF	Sædís Heiðarsdóttir	16 September 2004 (aged 18)	(Iceland) Stjarnan
2	MF	Birna Björnsdóttir	16 February 2004 (aged 19)	(Iceland) FH
7	MF	Sigríður Guðmundsdóttir	18 February 2005 (aged 18)	(Iceland) Selfoss
10	MF	Katla Tryggvadóttir	5 May 2005 (aged 18)	(Iceland) Þróttur
13	MF	Kimberley Hjálmarsdóttir	26 September 2005 (aged 17)	(Iceland) Þór/KA
14	MF	Ísfold Sigtryggsdóttir	28 April 2004 (aged 19)	(Iceland) Þór/KA
15	MF	Sigdís Bárðardóttir	1 December 2006 (aged 16)	(Iceland) Víkingur
18	MF	Írena Héðinsdóttir	19 September 2004 (aged 18)	(Iceland) Breiðablik
19	MF	Bergdís Sveinsdóttir	14 May 2006 (aged 17)	(Iceland) Víkingur
8	FW	Freyja Þorvarðardóttir	7 April 2004 (aged 19)	(Iceland) Þróttur
9	FW	Emelía Óskarsdóttir	5 March 2006 (aged 17)	(Iceland) Selfoss
11	FW	Snædís Jörundsdóttir	16 March 2004 (aged 19)	(Iceland) Stjarnan
17	FW	Ísabella Tryggvadóttir	8 September 2006 (aged 16)	(Iceland) Valur
20	FW	Vigdís Kristjánsdóttir	23 April 2005 (aged 18)	(Iceland) Breiðablik

=== Spain ===
Head coach: Sonia Bermúdez

The final 20-women squad was revealed on 7 July 2023. Esther Laborde was replaced by Judit Pujols.

No.	Pos.	Player	Date of birth (age)	Club
1	GK	Meritxell Font	10 December 2004 (aged 18)	(Spain) FC Barcelona
13	GK	Sofía Fuente	14 March 2005 (aged 18)	(Spain) Real Madrid
2	DF	Martina Fernández	1 October 2004 (aged 18)	(Spain) FC Barcelona
3	DF	Andrea Medina	11 May 2004 (aged 19)	(Spain) Atlético Madrid
12	DF	Judit Pujols	25 February 2005 (aged 18)	(Spain) FC Barcelona
14	DF	Estela Carbonell	18 October 2004 (aged 18)	(Spain) Levante UD
4	MF	Sandra Villafañe	18 September 2005 (aged 17)	(Spain) Madrid CFF
5	MF	Marina Rivas	2 July 2005 (aged 18)	(Spain) Madrid CFF
6	MF	Maite Zubieta	28 May 2004 (aged 19)	(Spain) Athletic Club
8	MF	Silvia Lloris	15 May 2004 (aged 19)	(Spain) Levante UD
10	MF	Júlia Bartel	18 May 2004 (aged 19)	(Spain) FC Barcelona
11	MF	Fiamma Benítez	19 June 2004 (aged 19)	(Spain) Valencia CF
20	MF	Érika González	31 August 2004 (aged 18)	(Spain) Levante UD
7	FW	Jone Amezaga	2 January 2005 (aged 18)	(Spain) Athletic Club
9	FW	Carla Camacho	2 May 2005 (aged 18)	(Spain) Real Madrid
15	FW	Sara Ortega	20 February 2005 (aged 18)	(Spain) Athletic Club
16	FW	Olaya Enrique	10 May 2005 (aged 18)	(Spain) Real Madrid
17	FW	Lucía Corrales	24 November 2005 (aged 17)	(Spain) FC Barcelona
18	FW	Lucía Moral	11 February 2004 (aged 19)	(Spain) Atlético Madrid
19	FW	Laia Martret	28 August 2005 (aged 17)	(Spain) FC Barcelona
