= Féerine Belhadj =

French footballer (born 2005)

Personal information
- Full name: Féérine Jade Belhadj
- Date of birth: 14 February 2005 (age 21)
- Place of birth: Valence, Drôme, France
- Height: 1.65 m (5 ft 5 in)
- Position: Goalkeeper

Team information
- Current team: Olympique Lyonnais
- Number: 16

Senior career*
| Years | Team | Apps | (Gls) |
| 2024– | Olympique Lyonnais | 2 | (0) |

International career^{‡}
| 2022 | France U17 | 11 | (0) |
| 2023–2024 | France U19 | 11 | (0) |
| 2024 | France U20 | 5 | (0) |
- * Club domestic league appearances and goals as of 23 April 2025 ‡ National team caps and goals as of 9 April 2024

Féerine Jade Belhadj (Arabic: فيرين جايد بلحاج, pronounced [fiːriːn bəlˈħaːdʒ]; born 14 February 2005) is a French professional footballer who plays as a goalkeeper for French club Olympique Lyonnais.

== Early life ==
Féerine Belhadj was born on 14 February 2005 in Valence, Drôme, Auvergne-Rhône-Alpes. She is of Algerian descent. She studies at Emlyon Business School.

== Club career ==
Belhadj played for FC Bourg-lès-Valence between 2014 and 2019. She played for Olympique de Valence between 2019 and 2020. In 2023, at the age of 18, Belhadj signed her professional contract with Olympique Lyonnais.

On 8 May 2024, Belhadj made her debut in the women's D1, on the last day of the regular season against Girondins de Bordeaux, condemned to descent into D2, in a rejuvenated OL team, the average age not exceeding 20. This match marked her first minutes as a professional. Despite OL's 2–1 defeat, Féerine Belhadj put in an interesting performance, making several decisive saves, including a penalty save, although a rebound allowed Bordeaux to equalize.

== International career ==
In 2021, Belhadj was selected to represent France in the U17 Euro 2022 qualifiers. In 2022, she was selected to play in the U17 Euro 2022. She and her team finished third in the competition.

In September 2022, Belhadj was called up to the French national team to take part in the Women's U17 World Cup in India. France finished bottom of their group, after a draw with Canada and two defeats to Tanzania and Japan.

In 2024, she was selected for the Women's U19 Euro 2024. The French U19 women's team was eliminated in the semi-finals of U19 Euro 2024 after a 2–0 defeat by the Netherlands. In May 2024, Belhadj was selected for the French U20 team to take part in the Sud Ladies Cup 2024, a preparatory tournament for the 2024 Women's U20 World Cup, taking place in Avignon between 28 May and 4 June. France finished top of Group B and qualified for the final, which they won on penalties against Mexico.
