= Tivoli Stadium =

Tivoli Stadium could refer to one of the following:

- New Tivoli in Aachen
- Old Tivoli in Aachen
- Tivoli Stadion Tirol (formerly named Tivoli-Neu) in Innsbruck
- Tivoli in La Louvière
