= 2022 FIFA U-17 Women's World Cup =

FIFA Football World Cup (Under 17)

- Kick off The Dream

Tournament details
- Host country: India
- Dates: 11–30 October
- Teams: 16 (from 6 confederations)
- Venues: 3 (in 3 host cities)

Final positions
- Champions: Spain (2nd title)
- Runners-up: Colombia
- Third place: Nigeria
- Fourth place: Germany

Tournament statistics
- Matches played: 32
- Goals scored: 95 (2.97 per match)
- Attendance: 185,781 (5,806 per match)
- Top scorer(s): (Colombia) Linda Caicedo (Germany) Loreen Bender (Japan) Momoko Tanikawa (4 goals each)
- Best player: (Spain) Vicky López
- Best goalkeeper: (Spain) Sofía Fuente
- Fair play award: Japan

The 2022 FIFA U-17 Women's World Cup was the seventh edition of the FIFA U-17 Women's World Cup, the multinational–international women's youth football championship, contested by the under-17 national teams of the member associations of FIFA, since its inception in 2008. The tournament was hosted by India, which would have hosted the 2020 edition before it was cancelled due to the COVID-19 pandemic. It was the second time that India have been hosting a FIFA tournament, after the men's 2017 FIFA U-17 World Cup, and the first time that India hosted a FIFA women's football tournament.

Morocco and Tanzania, along with host India, made their debuts in the tournament.

Spain were the defending champions, having won their first title in 2018. They managed to retain the title.

== Host selection ==
India were originally selected as hosts of the 2020 FIFA U-17 Women's World Cup on 15 March 2019. On 17 November 2020, FIFA announced that the 2020 edition of the tournament would be cancelled due to the COVID-19 pandemic. Instead, India were appointed as hosts of the next edition of the tournament in 2022.

On 16 August 2022, it was announced that the All India Football Federation, or AIFF, was suspended by FIFA due to undue influence from third parties. As a result, the 2022 FIFA U-17 Women's World Cup was stripped from India, as FIFA assessed the next steps when it came to hosting the tournament. On 26 August 2022, the AIFF were reinstated by FIFA due to the AIFF administration regaining control of daily affairs. As a result, the tournament went ahead as planned.

== Qualified teams ==
A total of 16 teams qualified for the final tournament. In addition to the hosts, 15 teams qualified from six continental competitions.

Confederation	Qualifying tournament	Team	Appearance	Last appearance	Previous best performance
AFC (Asia) (Hosts + 2 teams)	Host nation	India	1st	None	Debut
AFC (Asia) (Hosts + 2 teams)	Teams were nominated by AFC based on results of 2019 AFC U-16 Women's Championship and regional rankings (qualification cancelled)	China	3rd	2014	Group stage (2012, 2014)
AFC (Asia) (Hosts + 2 teams)	Teams were nominated by AFC based on results of 2019 AFC U-16 Women's Championship and regional rankings (qualification cancelled)	Japan	7th	2018	Champions (2014)
CAF (Africa) (3 teams)	2022 African U-17 Women's World Cup Qualifying Tournament	Morocco	1st	None	Debut
CAF (Africa) (3 teams)	2022 African U-17 Women's World Cup Qualifying Tournament	Nigeria	6th	2016	Quarter-finals (2010, 2012, 2014)
CAF (Africa) (3 teams)	2022 African U-17 Women's World Cup Qualifying Tournament	Tanzania	1st	None	Debut
CONCACAF (Central, North America and Caribbean) (3 teams)	2022 CONCACAF Women's U-17 Championship	Canada	7th	2018	Fourth place (2018)
CONCACAF (Central, North America and Caribbean) (3 teams)	2022 CONCACAF Women's U-17 Championship	Mexico	6th	2018	Runners-up (2018)
CONCACAF (Central, North America and Caribbean) (3 teams)	2022 CONCACAF Women's U-17 Championship	United States	5th	2018	Runners-up (2008)
CONMEBOL (South America) (3 teams)	2022 South American U-17 Women's Championship	Brazil	6th	2018	Quarter-finals (2010, 2012)
CONMEBOL (South America) (3 teams)	2022 South American U-17 Women's Championship	Chile	2nd	2010	Group stage (2010)
CONMEBOL (South America) (3 teams)	2022 South American U-17 Women's Championship	Colombia	4th	2018	Group stage (2008, 2012, 2014, 2018)
OFC (Oceania) (1 team)	Team was nominated by OFC rankings (qualification cancelled)	New Zealand	7th	2018	Third place (2018)
UEFA (Europe) (3 teams)	2022 UEFA Women's Under-17 Championship	France	3rd	2012	Champions (2012)
UEFA (Europe) (3 teams)	2022 UEFA Women's Under-17 Championship	Germany	7th	2018	Third place (2008)
UEFA (Europe) (3 teams)	2022 UEFA Women's Under-17 Championship	Spain	5th	2018	Champions (2018)

Notes

1. On 16 March 2022, the AFC announced that China PR would replace North Korea as the AFC’s representatives at the FIFA U-17 Women's World Cup due to the withdrawal of the DPR Korea Football Association.

== Venues ==
On 13 April 2022, FIFA confirmed 3 host cities in 3 Indian states:

1. Bhubaneswar, Odisha
2. Margao, Goa
3. Navi Mumbai, Maharashtra

Bhubaneswar	Margao	Navi Mumbai	2022 FIFA U-17 Women's World Cup is located in India
Kalinga Stadium	Pandit Jawaharlal Nehru Stadium	DY Patil Stadium	2022 FIFA U-17 Women's World Cup is located in India
Capacity: 15,000	Capacity: 19,000	Capacity: 55,000	2022 FIFA U-17 Women's World Cup is located in India

== Marketing ==
=== Emblem ===
The official emblem for the tournament was unveiled by FIFA and the local organising committee on 2 November 2019 at the Gateway of India in Mumbai. According to FIFA, the design combines elements from the natural world and Indian culture. The emblem takes the form of the tournament trophy with bright blue waves and "a paisley flourish" at its base. The two elements extend towards the top of the trophy which resembles a ball made of marigold flowers framed by a water droplet. The colour and style of the marigold was inspired by Bandhani textiles, and the stem features symbols inspired by Warli paintings and Bandhani patterns.

=== Mascot ===
The official mascot for the tournament, named Ibha, was unveiled on 11 October 2021 coinciding with the International Day of the Girl Child. Ibha is an Asiatic lioness, a lion subspecies that today survives in the wild only in India. The name Ibha means "one with good vision or judgement" in Khasi, a language spoken primarily in the state of Meghalaya. According to FIFA, the mascot represents Nari Shakti (woman power) and is a "strong, playful and charming Asiatic lioness that aims to inspire and encourage women and girls by using teamwork, resilience, kindness and empowering others."

=== Slogan ===
The official slogan for the tournament - "Kick Off The Dream" - was unveiled in February 2020.

== Draw ==
The official draw took place on 24 June 2022, 12:00 local time CEST (UTC+2) at the FIFA headquarters in Zürich, Switzerland. The teams were allocated based on their performances in the 5 previous U-17 Women's World Cups, five bonus points were added to each of the confederation's current champions that won the respective qualifying tournament (for this cycle). The host India was automatically assigned to position A1. Teams of the same confederation could not meet in the group stage.

Pot 1	Pot 2	Pot 3	Pot 4
India ^{H} Japan; Spain; Germany	Mexico; Canada; Brazil; New Zealand	United States; Nigeria; France; China	Colombia; Chile; Morocco; Tanzania

== Squads ==
Players born between 1 January 2005 and 31 December 2007 were eligible to compete in the tournament.

== Match officials ==
A total of 14 referees, 28 assistant referees and 16 video match officials were appointed officially by FIFA for the tournament on 30 August 2022. The Video assistant referee (VAR) system will be utilize for the first time in a FIFA U-17 Women's World Cup.

Originally, Susana Corella (Ecuador) was assigned as support referee only. However, she was assigned as principal referee during the tournament.

Confederation	Referees	Assistant referees
AFC	(South Korea) Oh Hyeon-jeong (Thailand) Pansa Chaisanit (Uzbekistan) Edita Mirabidova	(Australia) Joanna Charaktis (China) Fang Yan (China) Xie Lijun (Thailand) Nuannid Donjangreed (Thailand) Supawan Hinthong (Uzbekistan) Kristina Sereda
CAF	(Mauritius) Maria Rivet (Morocco) Bouchra Karboubi	(Egypt) Yara Abdelfattah (Mauritius) Queency Victoire (Morocco) Soukaina Hamdi (Morocco) Fatiha Jermoumi
CONCACAF	(Canada) Myriam Marcotte (Jamaica) Odette Hamilton (Mexico) Katia García	(Cuba) Ivett Santiago (Jamaica) Jassett Kerr-Wilson (Jamaica) Stephanie-Dale Yee Sing (Mexico) Enedina Caudillo (Mexico) Mayte Chávez (Suriname) Mijensa Rensch
CONMEBOL	(Colombia) María Victoria Daza (Uruguay) Anahí Fernández	(Colombia) Nataly Arteaga (Paraguay) Laura Miranda (Uruguay) Luciana Mascaraña (Uruguay) Adela Sánchez
UEFA	(Croatia) Ivana Martinčić (England) Rebecca Welch (Italy) Maria Sole Ferrieri (Romania) Iuliana Demetrescu	(England) Natalie Aspinall (France) Élodie Coppola (Hungary) Anita Vad (Italy) Francesca Di Monte (Netherlands) Franca Overtoom (Poland) Paulina Baranowska (Romania) Mihaela Țepușă (Slovenia) Staša Špur

Confederation	Video assistant referee (VAR)
AFC	(Australia) Lara Lee (Australia) Casey Reibelt (Syria) Hanna Hattab (Thailand) Sivakorn Pu-Udom (United Arab Emirates) Omar Al-Ali
CAF	(Eswatini) Letticia Viana (Ethiopia) Lidya Tafesse
CONCACAF	(Canada) Carol Anne Chenard (Honduras) Shirley Perelló (Nicaragua) Tatiana Guzmán (United States) Ekaterina Koroleva (United States) Felisha Mariscal
CONMEBOL	(Argentina) Salomé di Iorio
UEFA	(Czech Republic) Lucie Ratajová (Denmark) Frida Mia Klarlund (France) Maïka Vanderstichel

Support referee
CAF	(Tunisia) Dorsaf Ganouati
CONMEBOL	(Ecuador) Susana Corella
CONMEBOL	(Paraguay) Zulma Quiñónez

== Group stage ==
The draw for the group stage took place on 24 June 2022.

=== Tiebreakers ===
The top two teams of each group advanced to the quarter-finals. The format for tiebreakers were determined as follows:

1. points obtained in all group matches;
2. goal difference in all group matches;
3. number of goals scored in all group matches;

If two or more teams were equal on the basis of the above three criteria, their rankings were determined as follows:

4. points obtained in the group matches between the teams concerned;
5. goal difference in the group matches between the teams concerned;
6. number of goals scored in the group matches between the teams concerned;
7. fair play points in all group matches:
  - first yellow card: minus 1 point;
  - indirect red card (second yellow card): minus 3 points;
  - direct red card: minus 4 points;
  - yellow card and direct red card: minus 5 points;
8. drawing of lots by the FIFA Organising Committee.

All times are local, IST (UTC+5:30).

=== Group A ===
Pos	Team	Pld	W	D	L	GF	GA	GD	Pts	Qualification
1	United States	3	2	1	0	13	1	+12	7	Knockout stage
2	Brazil	3	2	1	0	7	1	+6	7	Knockout stage
3	Morocco	3	1	0	2	3	5	−2	3	
4	India (H)	3	0	0	3	0	16	−16	0	

Source: FIFA
Rules for classification: Group stage tiebreakers
(H) Hosts
11 October 2022
16:30

Morocco	0–1	Brazil
	Report	Jhonson 5'

Kalinga Stadium, Bhubaneswar
Attendance: 4,243
Referee: Edita Mirabidova (Uzbekistan)
11 October 2022
20:00

India	0–8	United States
	Report	Rebimbas 9', 31'; Kohler 15'; Gamero 23'; Thompson 39'; Emri 51'; Suarez 59' (pen.); Bhuta 62'

Kalinga Stadium, Bhubaneswar
Attendance: 4,100
Referee: Susana Corella (Ecuador)

14 October 2022
16:30

Brazil	1–1	United States
Carol 37'	Report	Kiorpes 33'

Kalinga Stadium, Bhubaneswar
Attendance: 3,639
Referee: Oh Hyeon-jeong (South Korea)
14 October 2022
20:00

India	0–3	Morocco
	Report	El-Madani 51' (pen.); Zouhir 62'; Cherif 90+1'

Kalinga Stadium, Bhubaneswar
Attendance: 8,749
Referee: Katia García (Mexico)

17 October 2022
20:00

Brazil	5–0	India
Gabi Berchon 11'; Aline 40', 51'; Lara 86', 90+3'	Report

Kalinga Stadium, Bhubaneswar
Attendance: 8,765
Referee: Myriam Marcotte (Canada)
17 October 2022
20:00

United States	4–0	Morocco
Kohler 24', 73'; Smith 68', 81'	Report

Pandit Jawaharlal Nehru Stadium, Margao
Attendance: 3,578
Referee: Anahí Fernández (Uruguay)

=== Group B ===
Pos	Team	Pld	W	D	L	GF	GA	GD	Pts	Qualification
1	Germany	3	3	0	0	11	2	+9	9	Knockout stage
2	Nigeria	3	2	0	1	7	3	+4	6	Knockout stage
3	Chile	3	1	0	2	4	9	−5	3	
4	New Zealand	3	0	0	3	2	10	−8	0	

Source: FIFA
Rules for classification: Group stage tiebreakers
11 October 2022
16:30

Chile	3–1	New Zealand
Á. Figueroa 12'; Rovner 22' (pen.); Cifuentes 64'	Report	Clegg 52'

Pandit Jawaharlal Nehru Stadium, Margao
Attendance: 4,064
Referee: Rebecca Welch (England)
11 October 2022
20:00

Germany	2–1	Nigeria
Stoldt 49'; Alber 61'	Report	Usani 30'

Pandit Jawaharlal Nehru Stadium, Margao
Attendance: 6,524
Referee: Myriam Marcotte (Canada)

14 October 2022
16:30

New Zealand	0–4	Nigeria
	Report	Bello 16'; Usani 34'; Afolabi 75'; Etim 90+5'

Pandit Jawaharlal Nehru Stadium, Margao
Attendance: 2,191
Referee: Pansa Chaisanit (Thailand)
14 October 2022
20:00

Germany	6–0	Chile
Veit 20'; Şehitler 24'; Alber 40'; Steiner 58' (pen.); Bender 60'; Portella 90+5'	Report

Pandit Jawaharlal Nehru Stadium, Margao
Attendance: 4,417
Referee: Maria Rivet (Mauritius)

17 October 2022
16:30

New Zealand	1–3	Germany
Clegg 10'	Report	Bender 5', 54'; Şehitler 60' (pen.)

Pandit Jawaharlal Nehru Stadium, Margao
Attendance: 1,945
Referee: Bouchra Karboubi (Morocco)
17 October 2022
16:30

Nigeria	2–1	Chile
Emmanuel 4'; Mosaku 82'	Report	Rovner 90+1' (pen.)

Kalinga Stadium, Bhubaneswar
Attendance: 4,261
Referee: Maria Sole Ferrieri (Italy)

=== Group C ===
Pos	Team	Pld	W	D	L	GF	GA	GD	Pts	Qualification
1	Colombia	3	2	0	1	4	2	+2	6	Knockout stage
2	Spain	3	2	0	1	3	2	+1	6	Knockout stage
3	Mexico	3	1	0	2	4	5	−1	3	
4	China	3	1	0	2	2	4	−2	3	

Source: FIFA
Rules for classification: Group stage tiebreakers
12 October 2022
16:30

Mexico	1–2	China
Guijarro 90+3'	Report	Qiao Ruiqi 49' (pen.); Yu Xingyue 90'

DY Patil Stadium, Navi Mumbai
Attendance: 8,086
Referee: Maria Sole Ferrieri (Italy)
12 October 2022
20:00

Spain	1–0	Colombia
Amezaga 85'	Report

DY Patil Stadium, Navi Mumbai
Attendance: 2,923
Referee: Iuliana Demetrescu (Romania)

15 October 2022
16:30

China	0–2	Colombia
	Report	Caicedo 9', 23'

DY Patil Stadium, Navi Mumbai
Attendance: 10,417
Referee: Ivana Martinčić (Croatia)
15 October 2022
20:00

Spain	1–2	Mexico
Pujols 74'	Report	M. Flores 47'; Saldívar 85'

DY Patil Stadium, Navi Mumbai
Attendance: 5,350
Referee: Edita Mirabidova (Uzbekistan)

18 October 2022
16:30

China	0–1	Spain
	Report	Artero 61'

DY Patil Stadium, Navi Mumbai
Attendance: 8,230
Referee: Odette Hamilton (Jamaica)
18 October 2022
16:30

Colombia	2–1	Mexico
Ortegón 41'; Caicedo 74'	Report	Caicedo 81' (o.g.)

Pandit Jawaharlal Nehru Stadium, Margao
Attendance: 4,920
Referee: Rebecca Welch (England)

=== Group D ===
Pos	Team	Pld	W	D	L	GF	GA	GD	Pts	Qualification
1	Japan	3	3	0	0	10	0	+10	9	Knockout stage
2	Tanzania	3	1	1	1	3	6	−3	4	Knockout stage
3	Canada	3	0	2	1	2	6	−4	2	
4	France	3	0	1	2	2	5	−3	1	

Source: FIFA
Rules for classification: Group stage tiebreakers
12 October 2022
16:30

Canada	1–1	France
Chukwu 67'	Report	Calba 73'

Pandit Jawaharlal Nehru Stadium, Margao
Attendance: 3,499
Referee: Bouchra Karboubi (Morocco)
12 October 2022
20:00

Japan	4–0	Tanzania
Shiragaki 33'; Itamura 67'; Tsujisawa 75'; Tanikawa 81'	Report

Pandit Jawaharlal Nehru Stadium, Margao
Attendance: 3,566
Referee: Anahí Fernández (Uruguay)

15 October 2022
16:30

France	1–2	Tanzania
Calba 77' (pen.)	Report	Mnally 17'; Bahera 60' (pen.)

Pandit Jawaharlal Nehru Stadium, Margao
Attendance: 2,625
Referee: Odette Hamilton (Jamaica)
15 October 2022
20:00

Japan	4–0	Canada
Kubota 9'; Shiragaki 37'; Tanikawa 52'; Takaoka 90+2'	Report

Pandit Jawaharlal Nehru Stadium, Margao
Attendance: 5,492
Referee: María Victoria Daza (Colombia)

18 October 2022
20:00

France	0–2	Japan
	Report	Tanikawa 29'; Kusunoki 90+1'

Pandit Jawaharlal Nehru Stadium, Margao
Attendance: 6,734
Referee: Maria Rivet (Mauritius)
18 October 2022
20:00

Tanzania	1–1	Canada
Mapunda 35'	Report	Allen 14' (pen.)

DY Patil Stadium, Navi Mumbai
Attendance: 3,728
Referee: Pansa Chaisanit (Thailand)

== Knockout stage ==
In the knockout stage, if a match was level at the end of normal playing time, a penalty shoot-out was used to determine the winner (no extra time was played).

=== Bracket ===
Quarter-finals
21 October – Navi Mumbai
United States	1 (3)
Nigeria (p)	1 (4)
22 October – Margao
Colombia	3
Tanzania	0
21 October – Navi Mumbai
Germany	2
Brazil	0
22 October – Margao
Japan	1
Spain	2

Semi-finals
26 October – Margao
Nigeria	0 (5)
Colombia (p)	0 (6)
26 October – Margao
Germany	0
Spain	1

Final
30 October – Navi Mumbai
Colombia	0
Spain	1
Third place
30 October – Navi Mumbai
Nigeria (p)	3 (3)
Germany	3 (2)

=== Quarter-finals ===
21 October 2022
18:20

United States	1–1	Nigeria
Villarreal 40'	Report	Edafe 27' (pen.)
Penalties
Adames (penalty scored); Emri (penalty missed); Suarez (penalty scored); Bhuta (penalty scored); Jackson (penalty missed)	3–4	(penalty scored) Etim; (penalty scored) Offiong; (penalty scored) Usani; (penalty missed) Folorunsho; (penalty scored) Edafe

DY Patil Stadium, Navi Mumbai
Attendance: 6,619
Referee: Iuliana Demetrescu (Romania)

21 October 2022
21:00

Germany	2–0	Brazil
Steiner 23'; Krüger 90+5'	Report

DY Patil Stadium, Navi Mumbai
Attendance: 3,751
Referee: Oh Hyeon-jeong (South Korea)

22 October 2022
16:30

Colombia	3–0	Tanzania
Caicedo 3'; Muñoz 17'; Rodríguez 36' (pen.)	Report

Pandit Jawaharlal Nehru Stadium, Margao
Attendance: 3,547
Referee: Ivana Martinčić (Croatia)

22 October 2022
20:00

Japan	1–2	Spain
Tanikawa 66'	Report	López 87', 90+3'

Pandit Jawaharlal Nehru Stadium, Margao
Attendance: 6,432
Referee: Katia García (Mexico)

=== Semi-finals ===
26 October 2022
16:30

Nigeria	0–0	Colombia
	Report
Penalties
Offiong (penalty scored); Etim (penalty scored); Usani (penalty scored); Afolabi (penalty scored); Edafe (penalty missed); Oyinlola (penalty scored); Folorunsho (penalty missed)	5–6	(penalty scored) Rodríguez; (penalty scored) Perlaza; (penalty missed) Muñoz; (penalty scored) Espitaleta; (penalty scored) Caicedo; (penalty scored) Ortegón; (penalty scored) Hernández

Pandit Jawaharlal Nehru Stadium, Margao
Attendance: 3,576
Referee: Iuliana Demetrescu (Romania)

26 October 2022
20:00

Germany	0–1	Spain
	Report	Corrales 90'

Pandit Jawaharlal Nehru Stadium, Margao
Attendance: 10,264
Referee: Rebecca Welch (England)

=== Third place match ===
30 October 2022
16:30

Nigeria	3–3	Germany
Ajakaye 20'; Bello 48'; Etim 63'	Report	Veit 73'; Bartz 85'; Bender 90'
Penalties
Sunday (penalty scored); Etim (penalty scored); Ajakaye (penalty scored); Adeshina (penalty missed)	3–2	(penalty scored) Veit; (penalty missed) Platner; (penalty missed) Bender; (penalty scored) Janzen; (penalty missed) Bartz

DY Patil Stadium, Navi Mumbai
Attendance: 4,722
Referee: Anahí Fernández (Uruguay)

=== Final ===
30 October 2022
20:00

Colombia	0–1	Spain
	Report	Guzmán 82' (o.g.)

DY Patil Stadium, Navi Mumbai
Attendance: 24,824
Referee: Katia García (Mexico)

== Winners ==
2022 FIFA U-17 Women's World Cup Winners

Spain
2nd title

== Awards ==
The following awards were given for the tournament:

Golden Ball	Silver Ball	Bronze Ball
(Spain) Vicky López	(Colombia) Linda Caicedo	(Germany) Mara Alber
Golden Boot	Silver Boot	Bronze Boot
(Germany) Loreen Bender	(Japan) Momoko Tanikawa	(Colombia) Linda Caicedo
4 goals, 250 minutes	4 goals, 285 minutes	4 goals, 504 minutes
Golden Glove
(Spain) Sofía Fuente
FIFA Fair Play Award
Japan

== Goalscorers ==
There were 95 goals scored in 32 matches, for an average of 2.97 goals per match.

4 goals

- (Colombia) Linda Caicedo
- (Germany) Loreen Bender
- (Japan) Momoko Tanikawa

3 goals

- (United States) Charlotte Kohler

2 goals

- (Brazil) Aline
- (Brazil) Lara
- (Chile) Tali Rovner
- (France) Lucie Calba
- (Germany) Mara Alber
- (Germany) Alara Şehitler
- (Germany) Marie Steiner
- (Germany) Jella Veit
- (Japan) Uno Shiragaki
- (New Zealand) Emily Clegg
- (Nigeria) Amina Bello
- (Nigeria) Edidiong Etim
- (Nigeria) Miracle Usani
- (Spain) Vicky López
- (United States) Melina Rebimbas
- (United States) Samantha Smith

1 goal

- (Brazil) Carol
- (Brazil) Gabi Berchon
- (Brazil) Jhonson
- (Canada) Amanda Allen
- (Canada) Annabelle Chukwu
- (Chile) Anaís Cifuentes
- (Chile) Ámbar Figueroa
- (China) Qiao Ruiqi
- (China) Yu Xingyue
- (Colombia) Yésica Muñoz
- (Colombia) Juana Ortegón
- (Colombia) Gabriela Rodríguez
- (Germany) Paulina Bartz
- (Germany) Melina Krüger
- (Germany) Laila Portella
- (Germany) Svea Stoldt
- (Japan) Mao Itamura
- (Japan) Mao Kubota
- (Japan) Sayami Kusunoki
- (Japan) Mio Takaoka
- (Japan) Ai Tsujisawa
- (Mexico) Maribel Flores
- (Mexico) Katherin Guijarro
- (Mexico) Montserrat Saldívar
- (Morocco) Djennah Cherif
- (Morocco) Doha El-Madani
- (Morocco) Yasmine Zouhir
- (Nigeria) Taiwo Afolabi
- (Nigeria) Opeyemi Ajakaye
- (Nigeria) Omamuzo Edafe
- (Nigeria) Blessing Emmanuel
- (Nigeria) Bisola Mosaku
- (Spain) Jone Amezaga
- (Spain) Marina Artero
- (Spain) Lucía Corrales
- (Spain) Judit Pujols
- (Tanzania) Christer Bahera
- (Tanzania) Veronica Mapunda
- (Tanzania) Diana Mnally
- (United States) Mia Bhuta
- (United States) Ella Emri
- (United States) Onyeka Gamero
- (United States) Nicollette Kiorpes
- (United States) Taylor Suarez
- (United States) Gisele Thompson
- (United States) Amalia Villarreal

1 own goal

- (Colombia) Linda Caicedo (against Mexico)
- (Colombia) Ana María Guzmán (against Spain)

== Final standings ==
Pos.	Team	Pld	W	D	L	Pts	GF	GA	GD
1	Spain	6	5	0	1	15	7	3	+4
2	Colombia	6	3	1	2	10	7	3	+4
3	Nigeria	6	2	3	1	9	11	7	+4
4	Germany	6	4	1	1	13	16	6	+10
Eliminated in the quarter-finals
5	Japan	4	3	0	1	9	11	2	+9
6	United States	4	2	2	0	8	14	2	+12
7	Brazil	4	2	1	1	7	7	3	+4
8	Tanzania	4	1	1	2	4	3	9	−6
Eliminated in the group stage
9	Mexico	3	1	0	2	3	4	5	−1
10	Morocco	3	1	0	2	3	3	5	−2
11	China	3	1	0	2	3	2	4	−2
12	Chile	3	1	0	2	3	4	9	−5
13	Canada	3	0	2	1	2	2	6	−4
14	France	3	0	1	2	1	2	5	−3
15	New Zealand	3	0	0	3	0	2	10	−8
16	India (H)	3	0	0	3	0	0	16	−16

== See also ==
- Sport in India – Overview of sports in India
