= Sara Ortega =

Spanish footballer (born 2005)

Personal information
- Full name: Sara Ortega Ruiz
- Date of birth: 20 February 2005 (age 21)
- Place of birth: Logroño, Spain
- Height: 1.54 m (5 ft 1 in)
- Position: Forward

Team information
- Current team: Athletic Club
- Number: 34

Youth career
- 2017–2019: Comillas
- 2019–2020: Athletic Club

Senior career*
Years	Team	Apps	(Gls)
2020–2021	Athletic Club C	14	(3)
2020–2023	Athletic Club B	48	(9)
2021–	Athletic Club	102	(8)

International career^{‡}
2021–2022	Spain U17	17	(0)
2023–	Spain U19	7	(1)
Medal record
Women's football
Representing Spain
UEFA Women's Under-19 Championship
Winner	2023 Belgium
FIFA U-17 Women's World Cup
Winner	2022 India
UEFA Women's Under-17 Championship
Runner-up	2022 Bosnia and Herzegovina
- * Club domestic league appearances and goals as of 20:10, 30 September 2026 (UTC) ‡ National team caps and goals as of 4 September 2023

Sara Ortega Ruiz (born 20 February 2005) is a Spanish professional footballer who plays as a forward for Liga F club Athletic Club.

== Club career ==
Ortega started her career at Comillas' academy. Ortega made her senior debut in the Copa de la Reina against Racing in January 2022 at only 16 years old, scoring a goal after coming on as a substitute. She became the first woman to debut for Athletic Club at 16 years of age since Leyre Monente in 2016. In February, she then debuted in the Primera División against Eibar.

== International career ==
In January 2020, Ortega received a call up to join the Spain under-16 team for training. Ortega made her debut for the Spain under-17 squad in September 2021 against Iceland. She was a member of the squads which finished runners-up at the 2022 UEFA Women's Under-17 Championship, then won the 2022 FIFA U-17 Women's World Cup.

She subsequently moved up to the under 19s, and won the 2023 UEFA Women's Under-19 Championship. Her progression at club and international levels closely mirrored her teammate and friend Jone Amezaga.

== Honours ==
Spain U17

- FIFA U-17 Women's World Cup: 2022
- UEFA Women's Under-17 Championship runner-up: 2022

Spain U19

- UEFA Women's Under-19 Championship: 2023

Individual

- UEFA Women's Under-19 Championship Team of the Tournament: 2023
