= Laura Gloning =

German footballer

Personal information
- Full name: Laura Marie Gloning
- Date of birth: 6 May 2005 (age 21)
- Place of birth: Rottweil, Germany
- Height: 1.65 m (5 ft 5 in)
- Position: Defender

Team information
- Current team: TSG Hoffenheim
- Number: 20

Youth career
- TSG Balingen
- –2021: SC Freiburg

Senior career*
Years	Team	Apps	(Gls)
2021–2025	FC Bayern Munich II	79	(6)
2022–2023	FC Bayern Munich	1	(0)
2025-	TSG Hoffenheim	36	(2)

International career^{‡}
2019	Germany U15	3	(0)
2021–2022	Germany U17	22	(0)
2023–2024	Germany U19	17	(1)
2024	Germany U20	6	(0)
2024–	Germany U23	10	(0)
- * Club domestic league appearances and goals as of 14 November 2026 ‡ National team caps and goals as of 9 June 2026

Laura Marie Gloning (born 5 June 2005) is a German footballer who plays as a defender for TSG Hoffenheim club in the Frauen-Bundesliga, the top level of league competition for women's association football in Germany.

== Club career ==
Gloning began playing football in Balingen at the local multi-sports club TSG Balingen. She later joined the youth academy of SC Freiburg, where she played six matches and scored one goal for their U17 team in the Southern Division of the U17 Women's Bundesliga in the 2020/21 season.

For the 2021/22 season, she was signed by FC Bayern Munich, where she was to develop within their reserve team. She made her senior debut on 20 August 2021 in a 0–3 home defeat against 1. FC Nürnberg. She scored her first goal on 26 September 2021 in a 4–1 home victory against VfL Wolfsburg's reserve team, making it 3–0 in the 26th minute.

On 28 May 2023, on the last Bundesliga matchday of the season 2022/23, she made her Bundesliga debut for Bayern Munich in their 11–1 home win against Turbine Potsdam, coming on as a substitute for Jovana Damnjanović in the 58th minute.

On 13 March 2025, she signed by Bundesliga club TSG Hoffenheim for the 2025/26 season, signing a contract dated until 30 June 2028.

== International career ==
She contributed through the Germany under-17 national team to Germany's victory at the 2022 UEFA Women's Under-17 Championship, scoring the decisive penalty in the final againstSpain under-17 national team to make it 3–2.

With Germany under-19 national team, she reached the final of the 2023 UEFA Women's Under-19 Championship, but lost to Spain on penalties and finished as runners-up.

== Career statistics ==
As of match played 14 November 2026

Appearances and goals by club, season and competition
Club	Season	League			National Cup		Continental		Other		Total	
Club	Season	Division	Apps	Goals	Apps	Goals	Apps	Goals	Apps	Goals	Apps	Goals
Bayern Munich II	2021–22	2. Frauen-Bundesliga	20	3	—		—		—		20	3
Bayern Munich II	2022–23	2. Frauen-Bundesliga	19	2	—		—		—		19	2
Bayern Munich II	2023–24	2. Frauen-Bundesliga	21	0	—		—		—		21	0
Bayern Munich II	2024–25	2. Frauen-Bundesliga	19	1	—		—		—		19	1
Bayern Munich II	Total		79	6	—		—		—		79	6
Bayern Munich	2022–23	Frauen-Bundesliga	1	0	1	0	—		—		2	0
TSG Hoffenheim	2025–26	Frauen-Bundesliga	26	2	2	0	—		—		28	2
TSG Hoffenheim	2026–27	Frauen-Bundesliga	10	0	2	0	—		—		12	0
TSG Hoffenheim	Total		36	2	4	0	—		—		40	2
Career Total			116	8	5	0	0	0	0	0	121	8

== Career highlights ==
Bayern Munich

- Frauen-Bundesliga: 2022–23

Germany U17

- UEFA Women's Under-17 Championship: 2022

Germany U19

- UEFA Women's Under-19 Championship runner-up: 2023
