= Jone Amezaga =

Spanish footballer (born 2005)

Personal information
- Full name: Jone Amezaga Martínez
- Date of birth: 2 January 2005 (age 21)
- Place of birth: Zalla, Spain
- Height: 1.69 m (5 ft 7 in)
- Positions: Forward; left winger

Team information
- Current team: Athletic Club
- Number: 7

Youth career
- Pauldarrak
- 2017–2020: Athletic Club

Senior career*
Years	Team	Apps	(Gls)
2019–2021	Athletic Club C	15	(19)
2020–2023	Athletic Club B	32	(6)
2022–	Athletic Club	99	(16)

International career^{‡}
2020	Spain U16	1	(0)
2021–2022	Spain U17	15	(4)
2023–2024	Spain U19	9	(2)
Medal record
Women's football
Representing Spain
FIFA U-17 Women's World Cup
Winner	2022 India
UEFA Women's Under-19 Championship
Winner	2023 Belgium
UEFA Women's Under-17 Championship
Runner-up	2022 Bosnia and Herzegovina
- * Club domestic league appearances and goals as of 15:42, 11 October 2026 (UTC) ‡ National team caps and goals as of 12 December 2023

Jone Amezaga Martínez (Note: In this Spanish name, the first or paternal surname is Amezaga and the second or maternal family name is Martínez.) (born 2 January 2005) is a Spanish footballer who plays as a forward or left winger for Liga F club Athletic Club.

== Club career ==
Amezaga started her career with Pauldarrak and joined Athletic Club's academy aged 12. She made her professional debut in the Liga F against Sporting Huelva in September 2022 aged 17, starting the match and opening the scoring with her first touch of the ball within the first minute of play. She continued to feature regularly that season, making 22 appearances and scoring three more goals (Note: Some sources, including Athletic's website, credit her with 2 goals against Villarreal, but the first rebounded off the post and went in off the goalkeeper, as seen in video footage.) including one at the club's main San Mamés stadium against Real Sociedad.

== International career ==
Amezaga made her debut for the Spain under-17 squad in September 2021 against Serbia. She was a member of the squads which finished runners-up at the 2022 UEFA Women's Under-17 Championship, then won the 2022 FIFA U-17 Women's World Cup.

She subsequently moved up to the under 19s, and won the 2023 UEFA Women's Under-19 Championship. Her progression at club and international levels closely mirrored her teammate and friend Sara Ortega.

== Honours ==
Spain U17

- FIFA U-17 Women's World Cup: 2022
- UEFA Women's Under-17 Championship runner-up: 2022

Spain U19

- UEFA Women's Under-19 Championship: 2023
