= Judit Pujols =

Spanish footballer

Judit Pujols Parera
Personal information
- Date of birth: 25 February 2005 (age 21)
- Place of birth: Montmajor, Catalonia, Spain
- Height: 1.58 m (5 ft 2 in)
- Position: Left-back

Team information
- Current team: Union Berlin
- Number: 5

Youth career
- 2019–2022: FC Barcelona Femení

Senior career*
Years	Team	Apps	(Gls)
2022–2023	FC Barcelona B		
2023–2025	FC Barcelona Femení	1	(0)
2025–2026	VfL Wolfsburg	19	(1)
2026–	Union Berlin	8	(0)

International career^{‡}
2021–2023	Spain U17	15	(3)
2023–2024	Spain U19	11	(0)
2024–	Spain U20	5	(0)
2025–	Catalonia	1	(0)
Medal record
Women's football
Representing Spain
FIFA U-17 Women's World Cup
Winner	2022 India
UEFA Women's Under-17 Championship
Runner-up	2022 Bosnia and Herzegovina
UEFA Women's Under-19 Championship
Winner	2023 Belgium
Winner	2024 Lithuania
- * Club domestic league appearances and goals as of 20 November 2026 ‡ National team caps and goals as of 17:57, 12 March 2025 (UTC)

Judit Pujols Parera (born 25 February 2005) is a Spanish professional footballer who plays as a left-back for Frauen-Bundesliga club Union Berlin.

== Early life ==
Pujols was born in Montmajor, Berguedà, a region in the autonomous community of Catalonia. She joined Barcelona's youth setup in 2019 aged 14, progressing through the ranks; she, Alba Caño, Lucia Corrales, Berth Doltra, Ona Barada, Laura Coronado, Meritxell Font, Claudia Riumallo, and Martina Fernández were the first females to move into La Masia. Pujols was eventually assigned to the reserve team ahead of the 2022–23 season and eventually promoted to the senior team ahead of the next season.

== Club career ==
Pujols made her senior team debut on 21 December 2023, coming on for the final 10 minutes of a UEFA Women's Champions League game vs Rosengård in a 7–0 home win. That proved to be her only senior team appearance season long. On 31 July 2024, Pujols extended her contract with Barça until 2025. Pujols didn't play any match during the first half of the season. On 27 March 2025, Pujols came on as a substitute in a 6–1 UEFA Women's Champions League win over VfL Wolfsburg.

In July 2025, Pujols signed a three-year contract with VfL Wolfsburg in Germany. In her single season with Wolfsburg, she made 24 appearances and scored one goal.

On 2 September 2026, fellow Frauen-Bundesliga club Union Berlin announced the signing of Pujols.

== International career ==
Pulols has represented Spain at international level for the U-17, U-19, U-20 teams. Pujols made 15 caps, scoring three goals for the under-17 side. For the under-19 team, Pujols made 11 caps without scoring. Pujols made her debut for the under-20s in 2024 and has since made 5 caps, all scoreless.

== Style of play ==
Pujols plays as a defender, as a full-back, specifically preferring the role of playing as a left-back. She was described as one of football's greatest talents in her age group at the young age of 19. Though primarily playing for the B team, she is also a part of the first team, winning two league titles, one cup, three super cups, two champions leagues on club level, and one FIFA under-17 world cup, a UEFA under-17 championship and two UEFA under-19 championships at the youth international level. Her technical skills, use of both feet, and passion are characteristics of her style of play. Pujols is adept at using her both feet, and though naturally left-footed has a very strong right foot.

== Honours ==
FC Barcelona Femení

- Liga F: 2023–24
- UEFA Women's Champions League: 2023–24
- Copa de la Reina de Fútbol: 2023–24
- Supercopa de España Femenina: 2023–24, 2024–25

Spain U17

- FIFA Under-17 Women's World Cup: 2022
- UEFA Women's Under-17 Championship runner-up: 2022

Spain U19

- UEFA Women's Under-19 Championship: 2023, 2024
