= Lucie Calba =

French footballer (born 2005)

Personal information
- Date of birth: 24 February 2005 (age 21)
- Place of birth: Metz, France
- Height: 1.65 m (5 ft 5 in)
- Position: Forward

Team information
- Current team: Fleury
- Number: 99

Youth career
- 2010–2015: ES Bechy
- 2015–2021: Metz

Senior career*
| Years | Team | Apps | (Gls) |
| 2021–2024 | Metz | 50 | (9) |
| 2024–2025 | Reims | 20 | (4) |
| 2025–2026 | Nantes | 20 | (11) |
| 2026– | Fleury | 0 | (0) |

International career^{‡}
| 2021–2022 | France U17 | 13 | (4) |
| 2023–2024 | France U19 | 15 | (1) |
| 2024 | France U20 | 1 | (0) |
| 2024– | France U23 | 7 | (1) |
- * Club domestic league appearances and goals as of 23:00, 6 May 2026 (UTC) ‡ National team caps and goals as of 23:00, 12 April 2026 (UTC)

Lucie Calba (born 24 February 2005) is a French professional footballer who plays as a forward for Première Ligue club Fleury. She has previously played for Stade de Reims and FC Metz.

== Club career ==
In 2015, Calba joined FC Metz's academy after having previously trained with ES Bechy. She eventually began getting opportunities with Metz's first-team squad, scoring her first senior goal on 24 April 2022 to help Metz beat FC Vendenheim, 8–0. In August 2022, Calba signed her first professional contract with Metz's first team in the Division 2 Féminine. That season, she helped Metz fight to gain relegation to the Division 1 Féminine, a mission that did not end up bearing any success. In the summer of 2024, Calba departed from Metz. She had spent 9 years with the club.

On 1 August 2024, first-division club Stade de Reims announced that they had signed Calba. Calba scored her first Division 1 goal in October 2024, netting in a 3–2 defeat to Paris FC. She struggled at the start of the season before gaining momentum near the midseason winter break, scoring in 3 consecutive games in November 2024 to distance Reims from the relegation line. Ultimately, Reims were not able to escape relegation in the end and were sent down to the Seconde Ligue in the summer of 2025. Calba had still managed to be a bright spot for Reims, recording 5 goals and 3 assists across all competitions. The UNFP selected her as one of the candidates for its young player of the season award.

Following Reims' relegation, Calba sought opportunities to stay in the French top-flight. In July 2025, she signed for FC Nantes after being allured by the team's possession-based style of play. On 27 September 2025, she scored her first two Nantes goals against newly promoted side Lens to secure a 4–3 Nantes victory in the second game of the season. On 3 October, Calba scored in a 3–1 win over Paris FC that lifted Nantes into second place in the league standings. Her goal was the first-ever from a Nantes' women's player at main club ground Stade de la Beaujoire. Leading up to the midseason break, Calba scored goals in consecutive matches and was named the December 2025 Première Ligue Player of the Month. She continued her offensive form even after returning to play, scoring the game-winner in a cup fixture against Saint-Étienne shortly after the winter break concluded. In March 2026, Calba scored a goal against Strasbourg that went viral due to its aesthetically pleasing build-up.

On 8 July 2027, it was announced that Calba had signed a two-year contract with Fleury until 2028.

== International career ==
Calba received her first experiences with the France youth national teams in 2022, getting a call-up to the under-17 national team at age 17. She later competed for the U17s at the 2022 UEFA Women's Under-17 Championship, scoring twice to help France earn a bronze medal and qualification for the FIFA U-17 Women's World Cup later that year. In October 2022, she was named to the squad that finished in last place of Group D at the U-17 World Cup. She scored both of France's goals in the tournament, first in a draw with Canada and then in a loss to Tanzania.

Calba has also played for the under-19 national team, making 15 appearances and scoring one goal across two years. In 2024, she captained the team in a victory over Sweden. Calba started gaining experience with the France U23s in 2024, registering 6 matches for the team despite missing one camp due to injury.

In May 2026, Calba received her first call-up to the France senior national team.

== Career statistics ==
As of 31 March 2026

Appearances and goals by club, season and competition
| Club | Season | League | | | Cup (Note: Includes the Coupe de France Féminine and the Coupe LFFP) | | Total | |
| Club | Season | Division | Apps | Goals | Apps | Goals | Apps | Goals |
|---|---|---|---|---|---|---|---|---|
| FC Metz | 2021–22 | Division 2 Féminine | 13 | 1 | — | | 13 | 1 |
| FC Metz | 2022–23 | Division 2 Féminine | 18 | 3 | 2 | 2 | 20 | 5 |
| FC Metz | 2023–24 | Division 2 Féminine | 19 | 5 | 1 | 0 | 20 | 5 |
| FC Metz | Total | | 50 | 9 | 3 | 2 | 53 | 11 |
| Stade de Reims | 2024–25 | Première Ligue | 20 | 4 | 2 | 0 | 22 | 4 |
| FC Nantes | 2025–26 | Première Ligue | 18 | 9 | 5 | 3 | 23 | 12 |
| Career total | | | 88 | 22 | 10 | 5 | 98 | 27 |

== Honours ==
Individual

- LFFP Première Ligue goal of the season: 2025–26
- Première Ligue Player of the Month: December 2025
