= 2023 UEFA Women's Under-19 Championship =

Europees kampioenschap dames onder 19 2023 Championnat d'Europe féminin des moins de 19 ans 2023 U-19-Fußball-Europameisterschaft der Frauen 2023

Tournament details
- Host country: Belgium
- Dates: 18–30 July
- Teams: 8 (from 1 confederation)
- Venue: 4 (in 3 host cities)

Final positions
- Champions: Spain (5th title)
- Runners-up: Germany

Tournament statistics
- Matches played: 15
- Goals scored: 47 (3.13 per match)
- Attendance: 15,149 (1,010 per match)
- Top scorer(s): (France) Louna Ribadeira (4 goals)
- Best player: (France) Louna Ribadeira

The 2023 UEFA Women's Under-19 Championship was the 20th edition of the UEFA Women's Under-19 Championship, the annual international youth football championship organised by UEFA for the women's under-19 national teams of Europe. Belgium hosted the tournament on 18–30 July. It was the first women's final tournament held in Belgium. A total of eight teams played in the tournament, with players born on or after 1 January 2004 eligible to participate.

Similar to the previous editions held in odd-numbered years, the tournament acted as the UEFA qualifiers for the FIFA U-20 Women's World Cup. The top four teams of the tournament qualified for the 2024 FIFA U-20 Women's World Cup in Colombia as the UEFA representatives. However, on 4 October 2023, after the announcement of the expansion of the 2024 FIFA U-20 Women's World Cup to 24 teams, a new fifth spot was allocated to UEFA and the winner of a play-off between the group stage third-placed teams would take this fifth spot.

Spain were the defending champions and successfully defended the title after beating Germany in the final.

== Qualification ==
52 (out of 55) UEFA nations entered the qualifying competition, with the hosts Belgium also competing despite already qualifying automatically, and seven teams would qualify for the final tournament at the end of round 2 to join the hosts. The draw for round 1 was held on 31 May 2022, at the UEFA headquarters in Nyon, Switzerland.

=== Qualified teams ===
The following teams qualified for the final tournament.

| Team | Method of qualification | Appearance | Last appearance | Previous best performance |
|---|---|---|---|---|
| Belgium | Hosts | 5th | 2019 (Group stage) | Group stage (2006, 2011, 2014, 2019) |
| Germany | Round 2 Group A1 winners | 18th | 2022 (Group stage) | Champions (2002, 2006, 2007, 2011) |
| Czech Republic | Round 2 Group A2 winners | 2nd | 2022 (Group stage) | Group stage (2022) |
| France | Round 2 Group A3 winners | 17th | 2022 (Semi-finals) | Champions (2003, 2010, 2013, 2016, 2019) |
| Spain | Round 2 Group A4 winners | 16th | 2022 (Champions) | Champions (2004, 2017, 2018, 2022) |
| Iceland | Round 2 Group A5 winners | 3rd | 2009 (Group stage) | Group stage (2007, 2009) |
| Austria | Round 2 Group A6 winners | 2nd | 2016 (Group stage) | Group stage (2016) |
| Netherlands | Round 2 Group A7 winners | 10th | 2019 (Semi-finals) | Champions (2014) |

=== Final draw ===
The final draw was held on 26 April 2023, 10:00 CET, at the headquarters of the Royal Belgian Football Association (RBFA) in Tubize, Belgium.

== Venues ==
Belgium
Tubize
| RBFA Academy Stadium | Stade Leburton |
| Capacity: 2,000 | Capacity: 8,100 |
2023 UEFA Women's Under-19 Championship is located in Belgium
| Leuven (Heverlee) | La Louvière |
| Den Dreef | Stade du Tivoli |
| Capacity: 10,020 | Capacity: 12,500 |

== Squads ==
Each national team have to submit a squad of 20 players, two of whom had to be goalkeepers (Regulations Article 44.01).

== Group stage ==
The group winners and runners-up advanced to the semi-finals and qualified for the 2024 FIFA U-20 Women's World Cup. After the announcement of the expansion of the 2024 FIFA U-20 Women's World Cup to 24 teams, a new fifth spot was allocated to UEFA, and the winner of a play-off between the group stage third-placed teams would take this fifth spot.

Tiebreakers

In the group stage, teams were ranked according to points (3 points for a win, 1 point for a draw, 0 points for a loss), and if tied on points, the following tiebreaking criteria were applied, in the order given, to determine the rankings (Regulations Articles 20.01 and 20.02):

1. Points in head-to-head matches among tied teams;
2. Goal difference in head-to-head matches among tied teams;
3. Goals scored in head-to-head matches among tied teams;
4. If more than two teams were tied, and after applying all head-to-head criteria above, a subset of teams were still tied, all head-to-head criteria above were reapplied exclusively to that subset of teams;
5. Goal difference in all group matches;
6. Goals scored in all group matches;
7. Penalty shoot-out if only two teams had the same number of points, and they met in the last round of the group and were tied after applying all criteria above (not used if more than two teams had the same number of points, or if their rankings were not relevant for qualification for the next stage);
8. Disciplinary points (red card = 3 points, yellow card = 1 point, expulsion for two yellow cards in one match = 3 points);
9. Higher position in the qualification round 2 league ranking

All times are local, CEST (UTC+2).

=== Group A ===
| Pos | Team | Pld | W | D | L | GF | GA | GD | Pts | Qualification |
|---|---|---|---|---|---|---|---|---|---|---|
| 1 | Netherlands | 3 | 2 | 0 | 1 | 6 | 2 | +4 | 6 (Note: Netherlands 3 v 1 Germany) | Knockout stage and 2024 FIFA U-20 Women's World Cup |
| 2 | Germany | 3 | 2 | 0 | 1 | 9 | 3 | +6 | 6 | Knockout stage and 2024 FIFA U-20 Women's World Cup |
| 3 | Austria | 3 | 1 | 1 | 1 | 4 | 9 | −5 | 4 | Fifth place play-off for 2024 FIFA U-20 Women's World Cup |
| 4 | Belgium (H) | 3 | 0 | 1 | 2 | 3 | 8 | −5 | 1 | |

Source: UEFA
Rules for classification: Group stage tiebreakers
(H) Hosts
Notes:
18 July 2023
17:30

| Germany | 6–0 | Austria |
|---|---|---|
| Nachtigall 16', 29'; Şehitler 18', 77'; Alber 26'; Kett 49' | Report |

RBFA Academy Stadium, Tubize
Attendance: 306
Referee: Abigail Byrne (England)
18 July 2023
20:30

| Belgium | 0–3 | Netherlands |
|---|---|---|
| | Report | Huizenga 30'; Henry 55'; Tolhoek 86' |

Den Dreef, Leuven
Attendance: 3,384
Referee: Ewa Augustyn (Poland)

21 July 2023
17:30

| Belgium | 0–2 | Germany |
|---|---|---|
| | Report | Kett 37'; Alber 52' |

Stade Leburton, Tubize
Attendance: 2,548
Referee: Frida Klarlund (Denmark)
21 July 2023
20:30

| Austria | 1–0 | Netherlands |
|---|---|---|
| Mädl 70' | Report |

RBFA Academy Stadium, Tubize
Attendance: 430
Referee: Sabina Bolic (Croatia)

24 July 2023
17:30

| Austria | 3–3 | Belgium |
|---|---|---|
| Rukavina 11'; Natter 50' (pen.); Mädl 59' | Report | Jacobs 47'; Ampoorter 56'; Detruyer 60' |

Stade du Tivoli, La Louvière
Attendance: 1,479
Referee: Jelena Cvetković (Serbia)
24 July 2023
17:30

| Netherlands | 3–1 | Germany |
|---|---|---|
| Veit 42' (o.g.); Keukelaar 62'; Van Gool 81' (pen.) | Report | Açıkgöz 27' |

Stade Leburton, Tubize
Attendance: 621
Referee: Michèle Schmölzer (Switzerland)

=== Group B ===
| Pos | Team | Pld | W | D | L | GF | GA | GD | Pts | Qualification |
|---|---|---|---|---|---|---|---|---|---|---|
| 1 | France | 3 | 3 | 0 | 0 | 6 | 1 | +5 | 9 | Knockout stage and 2024 FIFA U-20 Women's World Cup |
| 2 | Spain | 3 | 2 | 0 | 1 | 10 | 2 | +8 | 6 | Knockout stage and 2024 FIFA U-20 Women's World Cup |
| 3 | Iceland | 3 | 1 | 0 | 2 | 3 | 6 | −3 | 3 | Fifth place play-off for 2024 FIFA U-20 Women's World Cup |
| 4 | Czech Republic | 3 | 0 | 0 | 3 | 0 | 10 | −10 | 0 | |

Source: UEFA
Rules for classification: Group stage tiebreakers
18 July 2023
17:30

| Czech Republic | 0–1 | France |
|---|---|---|
| | Report | Bárková 26' (o.g.) |

Stade du Tivoli, La Louvière
Attendance: 206
Referee: Frida Klarlund (Denmark)
18 July 2023
20:30

| Iceland | 0–3 | Spain |
|---|---|---|
| | Report | González 11'; Benítez 36'; Camacho 89' |

Stade Leburton, Tubize
Attendance: 402
Referee: Jelena Cvetković (Serbia)

21 July 2023
17:30

| Iceland | 2–0 | Czech Republic |
|---|---|---|
| Kristjánsdóttir 13'; Jörundsdóttir 85' | Report |

Stade du Tivoli, La Louvière
Attendance: 217
Referee: Michèle Schmölzer (Switzerland)
21 July 2023
20:30

| France | 2–0 | Spain |
|---|---|---|
| Fontaine 57'; Ribadeira 79' | Report |

Den Dreef, Leuven
Attendance: 458
Referee: Abigail Byrne (England)

24 July 2023
20:30

| France | 3–1 | Iceland |
|---|---|---|
| Ribadeira 27'; Neller 45'; Benera 89' | Report | Sveinsdóttir 33' |

RBFA Academy Stadium, Tubize
Attendance: 434
Referee: Ewa Augustyn (Poland)
24 July 2023
20:30

| Spain | 7–0 | Czech Republic |
|---|---|---|
| Camacho 4', 38'; Martret 13'; Benítez 17'; González 73'; Moral 78', 90+2' | Report |

Den Dreef, Leuven
Attendance: 278
Referee: Sabina Bolic (Croatia)

== Knockout stage ==
In the knockout stage, penalty shoot-out would be used to decide the winner if necessary (no extra time was played).

=== Bracket ===
Semi-finals
27 July – Stade Leburton
Netherlands | 0
Spain | 1
27 July – RBFA Academy Stadium
France | 2
Germany (a.e.t.) | 3

Final
30 July – Den Dreef
Spain (p) | 0 (3)
Germany | 0 (2)

=== Semi-finals ===
27 July 2023
17:30

| Netherlands | 0–1 | Spain |
|---|---|---|
| | Report | Bartel 12' |

Stade Leburton, Tubize
Attendance: 778
Referee: Ewa Augustyn (Poland)

27 July 2023
20:30

| France | 2–3 (a.e.t.) | Germany |
|---|---|---|
| Ribadeira 18', 21' (pen.) | Report | Veit 57'; Platner 90+3'; Kett 115' |

RBFA Academy Stadium, Tubize
Attendance: 597
Referee: Sabina Bolic (Croatia)

=== Final ===
30 July 2023
17:30

| Spain | 0–0 (a.e.t.) | Germany |
|---|---|---|
| | Report |
Penalties
| Enrique (penalty scored); Lloris (penalty scored); González (penalty scored); Corrales (penalty missed); Villafañe (penalty missed) | 3–2 | (penalty scored) Veit; (penalty missed) Diehm; (penalty scored) Hils; (penalty missed) Bartz; (penalty missed) Deutsch |

Den Dreef, Leuven
Attendance: 3,011
Referee: Frida Klarlund (Denmark)

== Goalscorers ==
There were 47 goals scored in 15 matches, for an average of 3.13 goals per match.

4 goals

- (France) Louna Ribadeira

3 goals

- (Germany) Franziska Kett
- (Spain) Carla Camacho

2 goals

- (Austria) Valentina Mädl
- (Germany) Mara Alber
- (Germany) Sophie Nachtigall
- (Germany) Alara Şehitler
- (Spain) Fiamma Benítez
- (Spain) Érika González
- (Spain) Lucia Moral

1 goal

- (Austria) Linda Natter
- (Austria) Magdalena Rukavina
- (Belgium) Valesca Ampoorter
- (Belgium) Marie Detruyer
- (Belgium) Lore Jacobs
- (France) Baby Jordy Benera
- (France) Aïrine Fontaine
- (France) Chloé Neller
- (Germany) Dilara Açıkgöz
- (Germany) Paulina Platner
- (Germany) Jella Veit
- (Iceland) Snædís María Jörundsdóttir
- (Iceland) Vigdís Lilja Kristjánsdóttir
- (Iceland) Bergdís Sveinsdóttir
- (Netherlands) Ziva Henry
- (Netherlands) Hanna Huizenga
- (Netherlands) Lotte Keukelaar
- (Netherlands) Danique Tolhoek
- (Netherlands) Rosa van Gool
- (Spain) Júlia Bartel
- (Spain) Laia Martret

1 own goal

- (Czech Republic) Anna Bárková (against France)
- (Germany) Jella Veit (against Netherlands)

== Awards ==
The following awards were given after the tournament:

- Player of the Tournament: (France) Louna Ribadeira
- Top Scorer: (France) Louna Ribadeira (4 goals)

=== Team of the Tournament ===
After the tournament, the Under-19 Team of the Tournament was selected by the UEFA Technical Observer panel.

| Position | Player |
|---|---|
| Goalkeeper | (Spain) Txell Font |
| Defenders | (Spain) Sara Ortega |
| Defenders | (Germany) Vanessa Diehm |
| Defenders | (France) Thiniba Samoura |
| Defenders | (Spain) Andrea Medina |
| Midfielders | (Spain) Júlia Bartel |
| Midfielders | (France) Kysha Sylla |
| Midfielders | (Germany) Alara Şehitler |
| Forwards | (Netherlands) Lotte Keukelaar |
| Forwards | (France) Louna Ribadeira |
| Forwards | (Germany) Franziska Kett |

== Qualified teams for FIFA U-20 Women's World Cup ==
The following five teams from UEFA qualified for the 2024 FIFA U-20 Women's World Cup in Colombia.

| Team | Qualified on | Previous appearances in FIFA U-20 Women's World Cup^{1} |
|---|---|---|
| Netherlands | 24 July 2023 | 2 (2018, 2022) |
| Germany | 24 July 2023 | 10 (2002, **2004**, 2006, 2008, **2010**, 2012, **2014**, 2016, 2018, 2022) |
| France | 24 July 2023 | 8 (2002, 2006, 2008, 2010, 2014, 2016, 2018, 2022) |
| Spain | 24 July 2023 | 3 (2004, 2016, 2018, **2022**) |
| Austria | 4 December 2023 (Note: After the announcement of the expansion of the 2024 FIFA U-20 Women's World Cup to 24 teams, UEFA decided to organize a play-off between Austria and Iceland, the group stage third-placed teams, on 4 December 2023. The fifth place play-off winner would qualify for the 2024 FIFA U-20 Women's World Cup.) | 0 (debut) |

^{1} Bold indicates champions for that year. Italic indicates hosts for that year.

=== Fifth place play-off ===
Winner qualified for the 2024 FIFA U-20 Women's World Cup.

4 December 2023
17:00

| Iceland | 0–6 | Austria |
|---|---|---|
| | Report | Ojukwu 11', 45'; Aistleitner 23', 45+5' (pen.); Ziletkina 70', 87' |

Futbol Salou Sports Center, Salou (Spain)
Referee: Abigail Byrne (England)
