= Érika González =

Spanish footballer (born 2004)

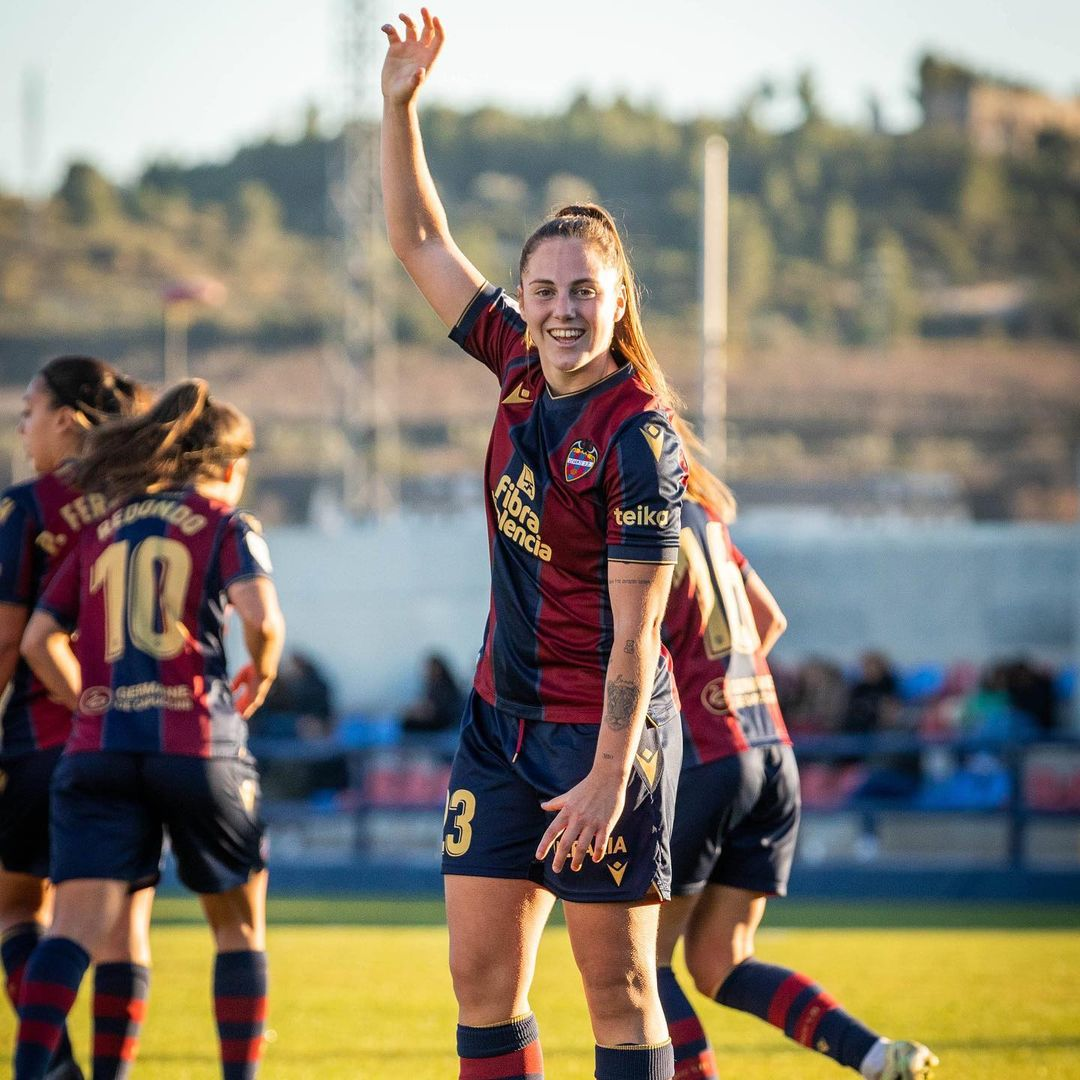
- Érika González Lud Femenino

Personal information
- Full name: Érika González Lombídez
- Date of birth: 31 August 2004 (age 22)
- Place of birth: Colombres, Ribadedeva, Spain
- Height: 1.68 m (5 ft 6 in)
- Position: Midfielder

Senior career*
Years	Team	Apps	(Gls)
2018–2019	Sporting B		
2019–2021	Sporting de Gijón	42	(7)
2021–2026	Levante	110	(25)
Medal record
Women's football
Representing Spain
UEFA Women's Under-19 Championship
Winner	2023 Belgium
- * Club domestic league appearances and goals as of 28 January 2023

Érika González Lombídez (born 31 August 2004) is a Spanish professional footballer who plays as a midfielder.

== Club career ==
González started her career at Sporting B.

== Honours ==
Spain U19

- UEFA Women's Under-19 Championship: 2023
