= Thiniba Samoura =

French footballer (born 2004)

Personal information
- Full name: Thiniba Samoura
- Date of birth: 11 February 2004 (age 22)
- Place of birth: Paris, France
- Height: 1.72 m (5 ft 8 in)
- Positions: Centre-back; defensive midfielder

Team information
- Current team: Paris Saint-Germain
- Number: 2

Youth career
- 2015–2019: FC Thiais
- 2019–2022: Paris FC

Senior career*
| Years | Team | Apps | (Gls) |
| 2021–2023 | Paris FC | 9 | (0) |
| 2023– | Paris Saint-Germain | 57 | (0) |

International career^{‡}
| 2020 | France U16 | 3 | (0) |
| 2021–2023 | France U19 | 19 | (1) |
| 2022 | France U20 | 7 | (0) |
| 2023 | France U23 | 4 | (0) |
| 2024– | France | 17 | (0) |
Medal record
Women's football
Representing France
UEFA Women's Nations League
| Runner-up | 2024 |
| Third place | 2025 |
- * Club domestic league appearances and goals as of 21 November 2026 ‡ National team caps and goals as of 10 October 2026

Thiniba Samoura (born 11 February 2004) is a French professional footballer who plays as a centre-back or defensive midfielder for Première Ligue club Paris Saint-Germain and the France national team.

== Club career ==
Samoura started her youth career with FC Thiais in 2015. She joined Paris FC in 2019 and made her professional debut for the club on 20 November 2021 in a 2–0 league win against Dijon.

On 18 August 2023, Paris Saint-Germain announced the signing of Samoura on a three-year deal until June 2026. On 8 July 2026, she extended her contract with the club until June 2030.

== International career ==
Samoura has represented France at various youth levels. She was part of the French squad at the 2022 FIFA U-20 Women's World Cup and the 2023 UEFA Women's Under-19 Championship. Despite losing in the semi-finals of the latter tournament, she was named in the team of the tournament.

On 3 December 2023, Samoura received her first call-up to the France senior team for 2023–24 UEFA Women's Nations League match against Portugal. She made her debut on 16 July 2024 in a 3–1 defeat to the Republic of Ireland. In June 2025, she was named in the French squad for the UEFA Women's Euro 2025.

== Career statistics ==
=== Club ===
As of match played 21 November 2026

Appearances and goals by club, season and competition
| Club | Season | League | | | National cup | | League cup | | Continental | | Other | | Total | |
| Club | Season | Division | Apps | Goals | Apps | Goals | Apps | Goals | Apps | Goals | Apps | Goals | Apps | Goals |
|---|---|---|---|---|---|---|---|---|---|---|---|---|---|---|
| Paris FC | 2021–22 | Première Ligue | 5 | 0 | 1 | 0 | — | | — | | — | | 6 | 0 |
| Paris FC | 2022–23 | Première Ligue | 4 | 0 | 0 | 0 | — | | 0 | 0 | — | | 4 | 0 |
| Paris FC | Total | | 9 | 0 | 1 | 0 | 0 | 0 | 0 | 0 | 0 | 0 | 10 | 0 |
| Paris Saint-Germain | 2023–24 | Première Ligue | 17 | 0 | 5 | 0 | — | | 7 (Note: Appearances in UEFA Women's Champions League) | 0 | 2 (Note: Appearances in playoffs) | 0 | 31 | 0 |
| Paris Saint-Germain | 2024–25 | Première Ligue | 14 | 0 | 2 | 0 | — | | 2 | 1 | 0 | 0 | 18 | 1 |
| Paris Saint-Germain | 2025–26 | Première Ligue | 17 | 0 | 3 | 0 | 3 | 0 | 4 | 0 | 0 | 0 | 27 | 0 |
| Paris Saint-Germain | 2026–27 | Première Ligue | 9 | 0 | 0 | 0 | 0 | 0 | 7 | 0 | — | | 16 | 0 |
| Paris Saint-Germain | Total | | 57 | 0 | 10 | 0 | 3 | 0 | 20 | 1 | 2 | 0 | 92 | 1 |
| Career total | | | 66 | 0 | 11 | 0 | 3 | 0 | 20 | 1 | 2 | 0 | 102 | 1 |

=== International ===
As of match played 10 October 2026

Appearances and goals by national team and year
| National team | Year | Apps | Goals |
|---|---|---|---|
| France | 2024 | 4 | 0 |
| France | 2025 | 8 | 0 |
| France | 2026 | 5 | 0 |
| Total | | 17 | 0 |

== Honours ==
Paris Saint-Germain

- Coupe de France: 2023–24

France

- UEFA Women's Nations League runner-up: 2023–24

Individual

- UEFA Women's Under-19 Championship Team of the Tournament: 2023
