= Paulina Bartz =

German footballer (born 2005)

Personal information
- Date of birth: 9 May 2005 (age 21)
- Place of birth: Hamburg, Germany
- Height: 1.71 m (5 ft 7 in)
- Position: Midfielder

Team information
- Current team: Hamburger SV
- Number: 37

Youth career
- SV Groß Borstel
- Niendorfer TSV
- Eimsbütteler TV

Senior career*
Years	Team	Apps	(Gls)
2021–2022	Hamburger SV	0	(0)
2022–2023	Eimsbütteler TV	11	(5)
2023–2026	Bayer Leverkusen	21	(0)
2024	Bayer Leverkusen II	3	(0)
2026	→ Hamburger SV (loan)	12	(0)
2026–	Hamburger SV	11	(2)

International career^{‡}
2019	Germany U15	3	(1)
2021–2022	Germany U17	15	(5)
2023–	Germany U19	25	(8)
2026–	Germany U23	3	(0)
- * Club domestic league appearances and goals as of 21 November 2026 ‡ National team caps and goals as of 9 June 2026

Paulina Bartz (born 9 May 2005) is a German footballer who plays as a midfielder for German Frauen-Bundesliga Club Hamburger SV.

== International career ==
Bartz has represented Germany at youth level.

== Honours ==
Germany under-17

- FIFA U-17 Women's World Cup: 2022 4th place
- UEFA Women's Under-17 Championship: winner 2022
