= Louna Ribadeira =

French footballer (born 2004)

Personal information
- Date of birth: 18 August 2004 (age 22)
- Place of birth: Villeneuve-Saint-Georges, France
- Height: 1.69 m (5 ft 7 in)
- Position: Forward

Team information
- Current team: Fleury (on loan from Chelsea)
- Number: 9

Youth career
- 2010–2018: Benfica Yerres
- 2018–2022: Paris FC

Senior career*
Years	Team	Apps	(Gls)
2021–2024	Paris FC	43	(12)
2024–	Chelsea	0	(0)
2024–2025	→ Paris FC (loan)	2	(1)
2025	→ Everton (loan)	3	(0)
2025–	→ Fleury (loan)	13	(3)

International career^{‡}
2020	France U16	2	(1)
2021–2023	France U19	30	(22)
2023–	France U23	10	(1)
2024	France	1	(0)
- * Club domestic league appearances and goals as of 22 November 2026 ‡ National team caps and goals as of 12 October 2026

Louna Ribadeira (French: [luna ʁibadɛʁa]; born 18 August 2004) is a French professional footballer who plays as a forward for Première Ligue club Fleury, on loan from Women's Super League club Chelsea.

== Club career ==
Ribadeira is a youth academy graduate of Paris FC. She nade her senior team debut for the club on 28 August 2021 by scoring a goal in a 4–1 league win against Guingamp. On 30 June 2022, she signed her first professional contract with the club until June 2025.

On 21 August 2024, Ribadeira signed a four-year contract with Women's Super League club Chelsea and returned to Paris FC on loan for the 2024–25 season. She was recalled from the loan on 7 January 2025 before being loaned out again to fellow WSL side Everton for the remainder of the season on 16 January.

On 2 September 2025, Ribadeira joined Première Ligue side Fleury on a season long loan deal. On 13 July 2026, Chelsea confirmed that Ribadeira had returned to Fleury on loan for another season.

== International career ==
Ribadeira was part of France squad for the 2023 UEFA Under-19 Championship. Despite losing to Germany in the semi-finals, she was the top scorer of the tournament and was selected as the player of the tournament.

On 22 May 2024, Ribadeira received her first call-up to the France senior team for UEFA Euro 2025 qualifying matches against England. She made her debut on 31 May 2024 in a 2–1 win against England.

== Career statistics ==
=== Club ===
As of match played 11 November 2026

Appearances and goals by club, season and competition
Club	Season	League			National cup		League cup		Continental		Other		Total	
Club	Season	Division	Apps	Goals	Apps	Goals	Apps	Goals	Apps	Goals	Apps	Goals	Apps	Goals
Paris FC	2021–22	Première Ligue	15	4	2	0	—		—		—		17	4
Paris FC	2022–23	Première Ligue	6	0	0	0	—		0	0	—		6	0
Paris FC	2023–24	Première Ligue	22	8	4	1	—		9 (Note: Appearances in UEFA Women's Champions League)	0	2 (Note: Appearances in playoffs)	0	37	9
Paris FC	Total		43	12	6	1	0	0	9	0	2	0	60	13
Chelsea	2024–25	WSL	0	0	0	0	0	0	0	0	—		0	0
Chelsea	2025–26	WSL	0	0	0	0	0	0	0	0	—		0	0
Chelsea	2026–27	WSL	0	0	0	0	0	0	0	0	—		0	0
Chelsea	Total		0	0	0	0	0	0	0	0	0	0	0	0
Paris FC (loan)	2024–25	Première Ligue	2	1	0	0	—		0	0	—		2	1
Everton (loan)	2024–25	WSL	3	0	0	0	0	0	—		—		3	0
Fleury (loan)	2025–26	Première Ligue	3	1	0	0	0	0	—		—		3	1
Fleury (loan)	2026–27	Première Ligue	8	2	0	0	3	1	—		—		11	3
Fleury (loan)	Total		11	3	0	0	3	1	0	0	0	0	14	4
Career total			59	16	6	1	3	1	9	0	2	0	79	18

=== International ===
As of match played 31 May 2024

Appearances and goals by national team and year
National team	Year	Apps	Goals
France	2024	1	0
Total		1	0

== Honours ==
Individual

- UEFA Women's Under-19 Championship player of the tournament: 2023
- UEFA Women's Under-19 Championship top scorer: 2023
- UEFA Women's Under-19 Championship team of the tournament: 2023
- UNFP Division 1 Féminine young player of the year: 2023–24
