= Mara Alber =

German footballer (born 2005)

Personal information
- Full name: Mara Alber
- Date of birth: 6 September 2005 (age 21)
- Place of birth: Bietigheim-Bissingen, Germany
- Height: 1.78 m (5 ft 10 in)
- Positions: Left winger; forward

Team information
- Current team: VfL Wolfsburg (on loan from Chelsea)
- Number: 18

Youth career
- TGV Dürrenzimmern
- 2016–2017: TSG Hoffenheim
- 2017–2019: VfB Eppingen
- 2019–2020: FC Astoria Walldorf
- 2020–2021: SpVgg Neckarelz

Senior career*
Years	Team	Apps	(Gls)
2021–2023	TSG Hoffenheim II	36	(14)
2022–2025	TSG Hoffenheim	33	(6)
2025–	Chelsea	0	(0)
2026	→ Werder Bremen (loan)	12	(2)
2026–	→ VfL Wolfsburg (loan)	3	(1)

International career^{‡}
2019	Germany U15	3	(1)
2021–2022	Germany U17	20	(7)
2023	Germany U19	14	(8)
2024–	Germany U20	4	(3)
2025–	Germany U23	11	(3)
- * Club domestic league appearances and goals as of 13:27, 25 October 2026 (UTC) ‡ National team caps and goals as of 21:57, 15 October 2026 (UTC)

Mara Alber (German: [ˈmaːʁa ˈalbɐ]; born 6 September 2005) is a German professional footballer who plays as a left winger or forward for Frauen-Bundesliga club VfL Wolfsburg, on loan from Women's Super League side Chelsea, and the Germany under-23 national team. She previously played for TSG Hoffenheim, and on loan for Werder Bremen.

== Early life ==
Mara Alber was born on 6 September 2005 in Bietigheim-Bissingen.

== Youth career ==
Alber started playing football at local multi-sports club TGV Dürrenzimmern. She then spent a year playing for TSG Hoffenheim's under-14 team before joining VfB Eppingen. After three years with Eppingen, Alber spent a season each at FC Astoria Walldorf and SpVgg Neckarelz.

== Club career ==
=== TSG Hoffenheim, 2021–25 ===
On 12 May 2021, Alber, age 15, joined TSG Hoffenheim to play for their under-20 team in the 2. Frauen-Bundesliga.

Alber made her senior team—and Frauen-Bundesliga—debut in April 2022 during a 3–0 away win over Bayer Leverkusen. In March 2024, Alber prematurely extended her contract with Hoffenheim, which had been scheduled to expire in 2025; the new deal would run until 2026. In September 2024, Alber suffered a fractured ankle and underwent surgery, missing the majority of the 2024–25 season.

=== Chelsea, 2025– ===
On 11 June 2025, Chelsea announced that, on 1 July 2025, Alber would join the side on a four-year contract for an undisclosed fee. Chelsea's interest in Alber had been reported as early as December 2023 by German media. In August 2025, Alber was part of Chelsea's travelling squad for a training camp in the Netherlands; she scored during the team's 2–0 friendly victory over FC Utrecht.

==== Loan to Werder Bremen, 2026 ====
On 6 January 2026, Alber joined Werder Bremen on loan for the remainder of the 2025–26 season. Ahead of her loan, Alber had not made her competitive debut for Chelsea, and had only been named to the team's matchday squad twice.

==== Loan to VfL Wolfsburg, 2026– ====
On 14 August 2026, it was announced that Alber would spend the 2026–27 season on loan at VfL Wolfsburg. On 26 August 2026, she made her club debut in Wolfsburg's 2–0 Champions League qualification victory over Inter Milan.

== International career ==
In 2022, Alber was a member of Germany's under-17 team who won the 2022 Under-17 Euro; in the final, Alber scored the 88th-minute equaliser which led Germany to victory over Spain through a penalty shoot-out win. She was the tournament's joint-top goalscorer. At the 2022 U-17 World Cup, Alber was awarded the Bronze Boot as Germany finished in fourth position.

Alber represented Germany's under-19 team at the 2023 Under-19 Euro. In the final, she was replaced by Miriam Hills in the final minute of added extra time; Germany were defeated by Spain in the penalty shoot-out.

Alber has represented Germany at the under-23 level since 2025. In June 2025, Alber scored for the team in a 2–1 loss to the USA.

== Career statistics ==
=== Club ===
As of match played 10 November 2026

Appearances and goals by club, season and competition
Club	Season	League			Cup (Note: Includes DFB-Pokal Frauen and Women's League Cup/Player's Cup)		Europe		Total	
Club	Season	Division	Apps	Goals	Apps	Goals	Apps	Goals	Apps	Goals
TSG Hoffenheim II	2021–22	2. Bundesliga	18	7	–		–		18	7
TSG Hoffenheim II	2022–23	2. Bundesliga	18	7	–		–		18	7
TSG Hoffenheim II	Total		36	14	0	0	0	0	36	14
TSG Hoffenheim	2021–22	Bundesliga	1	0	–		–		1	0
TSG Hoffenheim	2022–23	Bundesliga	6	0	–		–		6	0
TSG Hoffenheim	2023–24	Bundesliga	20	6	3	0	–		23	6
TSG Hoffenheim	2024–25	Bundesliga	6	0	1	0	–		7	0
TSG Hoffenheim	Total		33	6	4	0	0	0	37	6
Chelsea	2025–26	WSL	0	0	0	0	0	0	0	0
Chelsea	Total		0	0	0	0	0	0	0	0
Werder Bremen (loan)	2025–26	Bundesliga	12	2	1	0	–		13	2
Werder Bremen (loan)	Total		12	2	1	0	0	0	13	2
VfL Wolfsburg (loan)	2026–27	Bundesliga	3	1	1	0	6 (Note: Two appearances in UEFA Women's Champions League qualifying rounds and four appearances in the UEFA Women's Europa Cup)	0	9	1
VfL Wolfsburg (loan)	Total		3	1	1	0	6	0	9	1
Career total			84	23	6	0	6	0	96	23

== Honours ==
Germany U17

- UEFA Women's Under-17 Championship: 2022
- FIFA U-17 Women's World Cup runner-up: 2022

Germany U19

- UEFA Women's Under-19 Championship runner-up: 2023

Individual

- Fritz Walter Medal U17 Silber: 2022
- FIFA U-17 Women's World Cup Bronze Ball: 2022
