= Miracle Usani =

Nigerian footballer (born 2007)

Personal information
- Full name: Miracle Usani
- Date of birth: 20 June 2007 (age 19)
- Height: 1.65 m (5 ft 5 in)
- Position: Defender

Team information
- Current team: Edo Queens F.C.
- Number: 3

International career
Years	Team	Apps	(Gls)
2021-2022	Nigeria U17	18	(3)
2024–	Nigeria	4	(0)

Miracle Usani OON (born 20 June 2007) is a professional footballer who plays as a defender for Edo Queens F.C.. She also plays for the Nigeria women's national team.

She was part of the Nigerian women's national squad that won the 2025 Women's Africa Cup of Nations and was awarded the national honour Officer of the Order of the Niger (OON), a hundred thousand dollars and a three-bedroom apartment at the renewed hope estate in Abuja

== Honours ==
Nigeria

- Women's Africa Cup of Nations: 2024

Orders

- Officer of the Order of the Niger
