= Valesca Ampoorter =

Belgian footballer (born 2004)

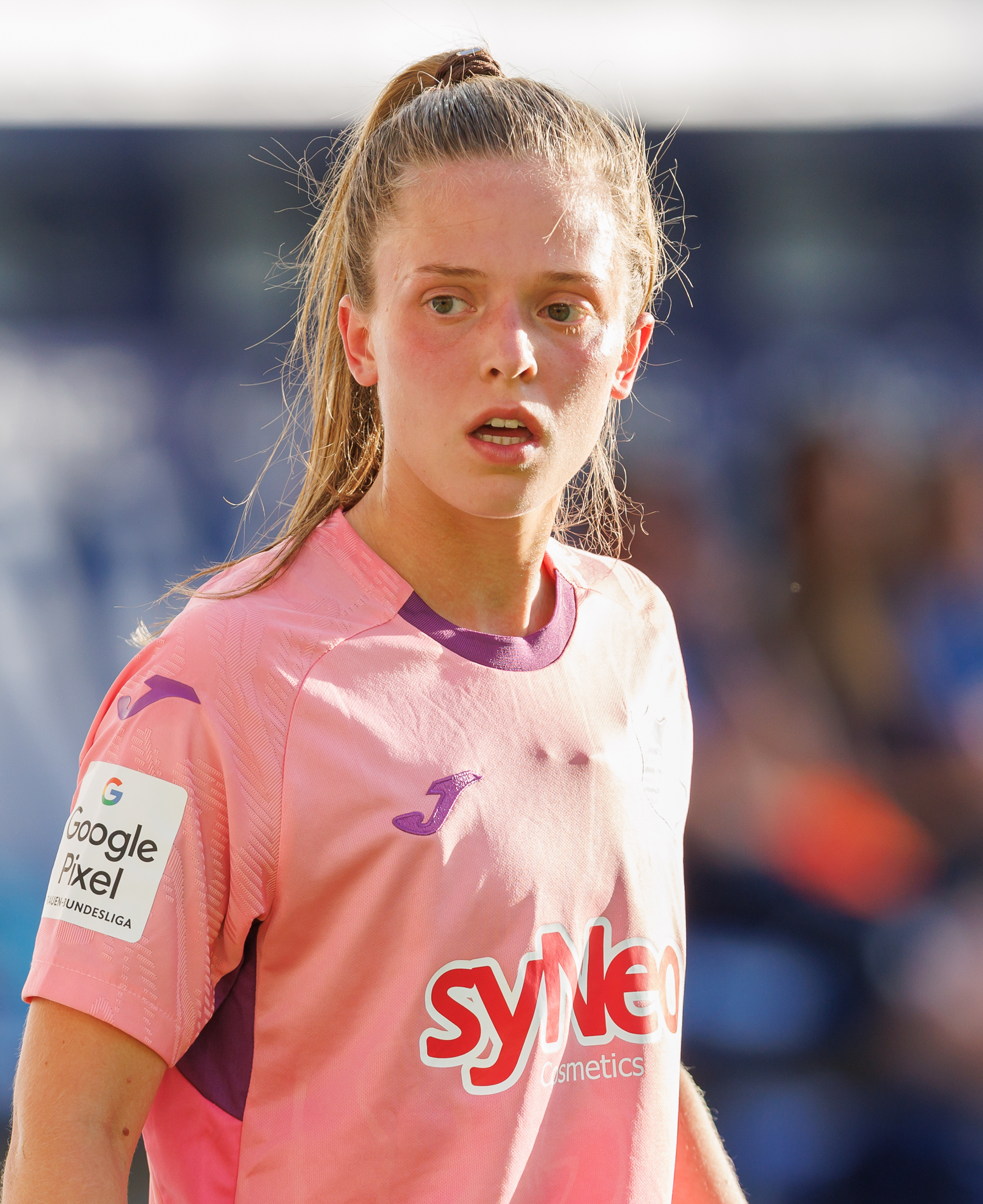
- Ampoorter with TSG Hoffenheim in 2025

Personal information
- Date of birth: 5 March 2004 (age 22)
- Place of birth: Asse, Belgium
- Height: 1.75 m (5 ft 9 in)
- Position: Midfielder

Team information
- Current team: TSG Hoffenheim
- Number: 18

Youth career
- Asse-Zelik
- SK Londerzeel
- AA Gent

Senior career*
| Years | Team | Apps | (Gls) |
| 2020–2021 | OH Leuven B | | |
| 2021–2025 | OH Leuven | 93 | (7) |
| 2025– | TSG Hoffenheim | 30 | (5) |

International career^{‡}
| 2018 | Belgium U15 | 1 | (0) |
| 2020 | Belgium U16 | 1 | (0) |
| 2021–2023 | Belgium U19 | 20 | (4) |
| 2023–2025 | Belgium U23 | 11 | (1) |
| 2023– | Belgium | 7 | (0) |
- * Club domestic league appearances and goals as of 8 November 2026 ‡ National team caps and goals as of 22:52, 24 May 2026 (UTC)

Valesca Ampoorter (born 5 March 2004) is a Belgian professional footballer who plays as a midfielder for Frauen-Bundesliga club TSG Hoffenheim and the Belgium national team. She has previously played for Belgian Women's Super League club OH Leuven, as well as for multiple Belgium youth national teams.

== Club career ==
=== OH Leuven ===
Born in Asse, Ampoorter began playing football at age 8 for local club Asse-Zelik. She moved to boys' club SK Londerzeel at age 13 before playing one season for AA Gent. In 2020, Ampoorter joined the youth team of Oud-Heverlee Leuven. The COVID-19 pandemic led OH Leuven's first team to expand its squad, allowing Ampoorter multiple chances to play senior football early on in her career. She debuted for OH Leuven's first team at the age of 17 and signed her first professional contract soon after. Over the next few years, she managed to become a mainstay on Leuven's squad despite also juggling academic responsibilities as a marketing student at the University of Leuven. In April 2022, Ampoorter had the chance to win her first Belgian Women's Super League title with Leuven, but a slim 1–0 defeat to Anderlecht dashed such hopes.

In December 2023, Ampoorter signed a three-year contract extension with OH Leuven through 2026. However, she would ultimately end up leaving the club a year early, in 2025. Prior to her official departure, Ampoorter capped off her Leuven career with the 2024–25 Belgian Super League title. Over the course of her five years at Leuven, Ampoorter had made 93 appearances and scored 7 goals.

=== TSG Hoffenheim ===
On 20 August 2025, Ampoorter signed a three-year contract with Frauen-Bundesliga side TSG 1899 Hoffenheim, joining fellow Belgians Jill Janssens and Féli Delacauw at the German club. She scored her first Bundesliga goal on 6 October 2025, contributing to a 4–1 win over Hamburger SV. On 6 November, she contributed to one of the fastest goals in league history, firing a 30-yard strike that forced an own goal from Laura Benkarth only 8 seconds into a match against SC Freiburg. 10 days later, Ampoorter scored a late penalty kick goal against Eintracht Frankfurt in the DfB-Pokal round of 16. However, Freiburg were outscored by Frankfurt, 6–4, and failed to advance to the quarterfinals. A regular in the squad, Ampoorter finished her first season at Hoffenheim having recorded 5 goals and 5 assists after appearing in all but one of the club's 26 matches. In June 2026, Ampoorter proactively signed a one-year contract extension with Hoffenheim to keep her with the club until 2029.

== International career ==
Ampoorter has represented Belgium at multiple youth levels, including U15, U16, U19, and U23. She was part of the squad that participated as the host nation at the 2023 UEFA Women's Under-19 Championship, during which Belgium finished last in Group A; in the team's final group stage match, a 3–3 draw with Austria, Ampoorter scored a goal from distance that briefly knotted the teams up at 2–2. Ampoorter has also made 11 appearances for the under-23 squad, multiple of which as team captain.

Ampoorter received her first call-up to the senior team in February 2023, joining Belgium's squad for the Arnold Clark Cup. She made her senior debut at the age of 19, earning a start in Belgium's opening match against South Korea on 19 February. She showed promise and recorded a shot off of the crossbar as Belgium won the game, 2–1.
