= 2022 UEFA Women's Under-17 Championship =

UEFA Europsko prvenstvo za žene do 17 godina 2022
- The official emblem

Tournament details
- Host country: Bosnia and Herzegovina
- Dates: 3–15 May
- Teams: 8 (from 1 confederation)
- Venue: 4 (in 4 host cities)

Final positions
- Champions: Germany (8th title)
- Runners-up: Spain
- Third place: France
- Fourth place: Netherlands

Tournament statistics
- Matches played: 16
- Goals scored: 49 (3.06 per match)
- Attendance: 6,720 (420 per match)
- Top scorer(s): (Denmark) Alma Aagaard (Germany) Mara Alber (Netherlands) Fieke Kroese (Spain) Carla Camacho (3 goals each)

The 2022 UEFA Women's Under-17 Championship (also known as UEFA Women's Under-17 Euro 2022) was the 13th edition of the UEFA Women's Under-17 Championship, the annual international youth football championship organised by UEFA for the women's under-17 national teams of Europe. Bosnia and Herzegovina hosted the tournament. A total of eight teams played in the tournament. Players born on or after 1 January 2005 were eligible to participate.

Same as previous editions held in even-numbered years, the tournament acted as the UEFA qualifiers for the FIFA U-17 Women's World Cup. The top three teams of the tournament qualified for the 2022 FIFA U-17 Women's World Cup in India as the UEFA representatives.

Germany were the defending champions, having won the last tournament held in 2019, with the 2020 and 2021 editions cancelled due to the COVID-19 pandemic in Europe. In the final, defending champions, Germany won their eighth title by defeating Spain 2–2 (3–2 after penalties).

== Host selection ==
The timeline of host selection was as follows:

- 11 January 2019: bidding procedure launched
- 28 February 2019: deadline to express interest
- 27 March 2019: Announcement by UEFA that declaration of interest were received from 17 member associations to host one of the UEFA national team youth final tournaments (UEFA European Under-19 Championship, UEFA Women's Under-19 Championship, UEFA European Under-17 Championship, UEFA Women's Under-17 Championship) in 2021 and 2022 (although it was not specified which association were interested in which tournament)
- 28 June 2019: Submission of bid dossiers
- 24 September 2019: Selection of successful host associations by the UEFA Executive Committee at its meeting in Ljubljana

For the UEFA European Women's Under-17 Championship final tournaments of 2021 and 2022, the Faroe Islands and Bosnia and Herzegovina were selected as hosts respectively.

== Qualification ==
The UEFA Executive Committee approved on 18 June 2020 a new qualifying format for the Women's Under-17 and Under-19 Championship starting from 2022. The qualifying competition will be played in two rounds, with teams divided into two leagues, and promotion and relegation between leagues after each round similar to the UEFA Nations League.

A record total of 49 (out of 55) UEFA nations entered the qualifying competition, with the hosts Bosnia and Herzegovina also competing despite already qualifying automatically, and seven teams will qualify for the final tournament at the end of round 2 to join the hosts. The draw for round 1 was held on 11 March 2021, 13:30 CET (UTC+1), at the UEFA headquarters in Nyon, Switzerland.

=== Qualified teams ===
The following teams qualified for the final tournament.

| Team | Qualified as | Qualified on | Previous appearances in Under-17 Euro^{1} only U-17 era (since 2008) |
|---|---|---|---|
| Bosnia and Herzegovina | Hosts | 24 September 2019 | 0 (debut) |
| Denmark | Round 2 Group A4 winners | 16 March 2022 | 3 (2008, 2012, 2019) |
| Netherlands | Round 2 Group A7 winners | 22 March 2022 | 4 (2010, 2017, 2018, 2019) |
| Germany | Round 2 Group A5 winners | 29 March 2022 | 11 (**2008**, **2009**, 2010, 2011, **2012**, **2014**, 2015, **2016**, **2017**, 2018, **2019**) |
| Finland | Round 2 Group A1 winners | 29 March 2022 | 1 (2018) |
| France | Round 2 Group A6 winners | 30 March 2022 | 7 (2008, 2009, 2011, 2012, 2014, 2015, 2017) |
| Norway | Round 2 Group A3 winners | 30 March 2022 | 4 (2009, 2015, 2016, 2017) |
| Spain | Round 2 Group A2 winners | 13 April 2022 | 10 (2009, **2010**, **2011**, 2013, 2014, **2015**, 2016, 2017, **2018**, 2019) |

^{1} Bold indicates champions for that year. Italic indicates hosts for that year.

=== Final draw ===
The final draw was held on 5 April 2022, 18:00 CET, at Hotel Hills in Sarajevo, Bosnia and Herzegovina. The eight teams were drawn into two groups of four teams. There were no seeding, except that the hosts Bosnia and Herzegovina were assigned to position A1 in the draw.

== Venues ==
| Sarajevo | Zenica | 2022 UEFA Women's Under-17 Championship is located in Bosnia and Herzegovina | Široki Brijeg | Mostar |
|---|---|---|---|---|
| Stadion Grbavica | Bosnian FA Training Centre | 2022 UEFA Women's Under-17 Championship is located in Bosnia and Herzegovina | Stadion Pecara | Stadion pod Bijelim Brijegom |
| Capacity: 13,146 | Capacity: 1,500 | 2022 UEFA Women's Under-17 Championship is located in Bosnia and Herzegovina | Capacity: 7,000 | Capacity: 9,000 |

== Squads ==
Each national team have to submit a squad of 20 players, two of whom had to be goalkeepers (Regulations Article 43.01).

== Group stage ==
The group winners and runners-up advanced to the semi-finals.

Tiebreakers

In the group stage, teams were ranked according to points (3 points for a win, 1 point for a draw, 0 points for a loss), and if tied on points, the following tiebreaking criteria were applied, in the order given, to determine the rankings (Regulations Articles 20.01 and 20.02):

1. Points in head-to-head matches among tied teams;
2. Goal difference in head-to-head matches among tied teams;
3. Goals scored in head-to-head matches among tied teams;
4. If more than two teams were tied, and after applying all head-to-head criteria above, a subset of teams were still tied, all head-to-head criteria above were reapplied exclusively to that subset of teams;
5. Goal difference in all group matches;
6. Goals scored in all group matches;
7. Penalty shoot-out if only two teams had the same number of points, and they met in the last round of the group and were tied after applying all criteria above (not used if more than two teams had the same number of points, or if their rankings were not relevant for qualification for the next stage);
8. Disciplinary points (red card = 3 points, yellow card = 1 point, expulsion for two yellow cards in one match = 3 points);
9. Higher position in the qualification round 2 league ranking

All times are local, CEST (UTC+2).

=== Group A ===
| Pos | Team | Pld | W | D | L | GF | GA | GD | Pts | Qualification |
|---|---|---|---|---|---|---|---|---|---|---|
| 1 | Germany | 3 | 3 | 0 | 0 | 6 | 0 | +6 | 9 | Knockout stage |
| 2 | Netherlands | 3 | 1 | 1 | 1 | 9 | 3 | +6 | 4 | Knockout stage |
| 3 | Denmark | 3 | 1 | 1 | 1 | 7 | 3 | +4 | 4 | |
| 4 | Bosnia and Herzegovina (H) | 3 | 0 | 0 | 3 | 0 | 16 | −16 | 0 | |

Source: UEFA
Rules for classification: Group stage tiebreakers
(H) Hosts
3 May 2022
14:00

| Denmark | 0–2 | Germany |
|---|---|---|
| | Report | Platner 3'; Stoldt 10' |

Bosnian FA Training Centre, Zenica
Attendance: 200
Referee: Réka Molnar (Hungary)
3 May 2022
20:00

| Bosnia and Herzegovina | 0–8 | Netherlands |
|---|---|---|
| | Report | Kroese 22', 73', 74'; Huizenga 29'; Balić 41' (o.g.); Keukelaar 45+1', 70'; Janssen 83' |

Stadion Grbavica, Sarajevo
Attendance: 1,237
Referee: Lovisa Johansson (Sweden)

6 May 2022
14:00

| Bosnia and Herzegovina | 0–6 | Denmark |
|---|---|---|
| | Report | Sanvig 5'; La Cour 23'; Ásgeirsdóttir 55', 72'; Aagaard 62', 63' |

Bosnian FA Training Centre, Zenica
Attendance: 600
Referee: Michèle Schmölzer (Switzerland)
6 May 2022
20:00

| Germany | 2–0 | Netherlands |
|---|---|---|
| Tolhoek 59' (o.g.); Platner 83' | Report |

Stadion Grbavica, Sarajevo
Attendance: 481
Referee: Teresa Oliveira (Portugal)

9 May 2022
14:00

| Germany | 2–0 | Bosnia and Herzegovina |
|---|---|---|
| Alber 54', 88' | Report |

Stadion Grbavica, Sarajevo
Attendance: 258
Referee: Gamze Durmuş (Turkey)
9 May 2022
14:00

| Netherlands | 1–1 | Denmark |
|---|---|---|
| De Klonia 46' | Report | Aagaard 28' |

Bosnian FA Training Centre, Zenica
Attendance: 230
Referee: Michalina Diakow (Poland)

=== Group B ===
| Pos | Team | Pld | W | D | L | GF | GA | GD | Pts | Qualification |
|---|---|---|---|---|---|---|---|---|---|---|
| 1 | Spain | 3 | 3 | 0 | 0 | 11 | 0 | +11 | 9 | Knockout stage |
| 2 | France | 3 | 2 | 0 | 1 | 3 | 3 | 0 | 6 | Knockout stage |
| 3 | Finland | 3 | 1 | 0 | 2 | 2 | 7 | −5 | 3 | |
| 4 | Norway | 3 | 0 | 0 | 3 | 1 | 7 | −6 | 0 | |

Source: UEFA
Rules for classification: Group stage tiebreakers
3 May 2022
17:30

| France | 2–0 | Finland |
|---|---|---|
| Chossenotte 40'; Calba 72' | Report |

Stadion Pecara, Široki Brijeg
Attendance: 100
Referee: Michalina Diakow (Poland)
3 May 2022
20:00

| Norway | 0–4 | Spain |
|---|---|---|
| | Report | Camacho 26'; López 52'; Martret 62'; Corrales 90' |

Gradski Stadium Mostar, Mostar
Attendance: 200
Referee: Michèle Schmölzer (Switzerland)

6 May 2022
17:30

| Spain | 4–0 | Finland |
|---|---|---|
| Pujols 18'; Camacho 23'; Amezaga 76'; Capdevila 87' | Report |

Stadion Pecara, Široki Brijeg
Attendance: 253
Referee: Lovisa Johansson (Sweden)
6 May 2022
20:00

| France | 1–0 | Norway |
|---|---|---|
| Oillic 61' | Report |

Gradski Stadium Mostar, Mostar
Attendance: 360
Referee: Gamze Durmuş (Turkey)

9 May 2022
20:00

| Spain | 3–0 | France |
|---|---|---|
| Partido 28'; Amezaga 31'; Corrales 69' | Report |

Stadion Pecara, Široki Brijeg
Attendance: 275
Referee: Réka Molnar (Hungary)
9 May 2022
20:00

| Finland | 2–1 | Norway |
|---|---|---|
| Seiro 20'; Angeria 80' | Report | Gaupset 55' |

Gradski Stadium Mostar, Mostar
Attendance: 150
Referee: Teresa Oliveira (Portugal)

== Knockout stage ==
In the knockout stage, penalty shoot-out was used to decide the winner if necessary (no extra time was played).

=== Bracket ===
Semi-finals
12 May – Zenica
Germany | 1
France | 0
12 May – Sarajevo
Spain | 3
Netherlands | 0

Final
15 May – Sarajevo
Germany (p) | 2 (3)
Spain | 2 (2)
Third place play-off
15 May – Zenica
France | 2
Netherlands | 0

=== Semi-finals ===
The winners qualified for the 2022 FIFA U-17 Women's World Cup. The losers entered the FIFA U-17 Women's World Cup play-off.

12 May 2022
14:00

| Germany | 1–0 | France |
|---|---|---|
| Şehitler 40' | Report |

Bosnian FA Training Centre, Zenica
Attendance: 170
Referee: Michalina Diakow (Poland)
12 May 2022
20:00

| Spain | 3–0 | Netherlands |
|---|---|---|
| Pou 3', 69'; Enrique 90+6' | Report |

Stadion Grbavica, Sarajevo
Attendance: 468
Referee: Lovisa Johansson (Sweden)

=== Third place play-off ===
The winner qualified for the 2022 FIFA U-17 Women's World Cup.

15 May 2022
14:00

| France | 2–0 | Netherlands |
|---|---|---|
| Rossi 16'; Calba 34' | Report |

Bosnian FA Training Centre, Zenica
Attendance: 221
Referee: Réka Molnar (Hungary)

=== Final ===
15 May 2022
20:00

| Germany | 2–2 | Spain |
|---|---|---|
| Stoldt 15'; Alber 88' | Report | Artero 28'; Camacho 63' |
Penalties
| Veit (penalty scored); Bender (penalty missed); Şehitler (penalty scored); Gloning (penalty scored) | 3–2 | (penalty scored) Enrique; (penalty missed) Pou; (penalty missed) Íñigo; (penalty scored) Pujols; (penalty missed) López |

Stadion Grbavica, Sarajevo
Attendance: 1,517
Referee: Michèle Schmölzer (Switzerland)

== Goalscorers ==
There were 49 goals scored in 16 matches, for an average of 3.06 goals per match.

3 goals

- (Denmark) Alma Aagaard
- (Germany) Mara Alber
- (Netherlands) Fieke Kroese
- (Spain) Carla Camacho

2 goals

- (Denmark) Emilía Ásgeirsdóttir
- (France) Lucie Calba
- (Germany) Paulina Platner
- (Germany) Svea Stoldt
- (Netherlands) Lotte Keukelaar
- (Spain) Jone Amezaga
- (Spain) Lucía Corrales
- (Spain) Nina Pou

1 goal

- (Denmark) Clara La Cour
- (Denmark) Pernille Sanvig
- (Finland) Jutta Angeria
- (Finland) Elli Seiro
- (France) Shana Chossenotte
- (France) Laureen Oillic
- (France) Fanny Rossi
- (Germany) Alara Şehitler
- (Netherlands) Daliyah de Klonia
- (Netherlands) Hanna Huizenga
- (Netherlands) Aniek Janssen
- (Norway) Signe Gaupset
- (Spain) Marina Artero
- (Spain) Magali Capdevila
- (Spain) Olaya Enrique
- (Spain) Vicky López
- (Spain) Laia Martret
- (Spain) Paula Partido
- (Spain) Judit Pujols

1 own goal

- (Bosnia and Herzegovina) Ajla Balić (against the Netherlands)
- (Netherlands) Danique Tolhoek (against Germany)

Source: UEFA

== Qualified teams for FIFA U-17 Women's World Cup ==
The following three teams from UEFA qualified for the 2022 FIFA U-17 Women's World Cup.

| Team | Qualified on | Previous appearances in FIFA U-17 Women's World Cup^{1} |
|---|---|---|
| Germany | 12 May 2022 | 6 (2008, 2010, 2012, 2014, 2016, 2018) |
| Spain | 12 May 2022 | 4 (2010, 2014, 2016, **2018**) |
| France | 15 May 2022 | 2 (2008, **2012**) |

^{1} Bold indicates champions for that year. Italic indicates hosts for that year.
