= Stade du Tivoli =

Multi-use stadium in La Louvière, Belgium

Coordinates: 50°28′42″N 4°12′04″E

Stade Communal du Tivoli
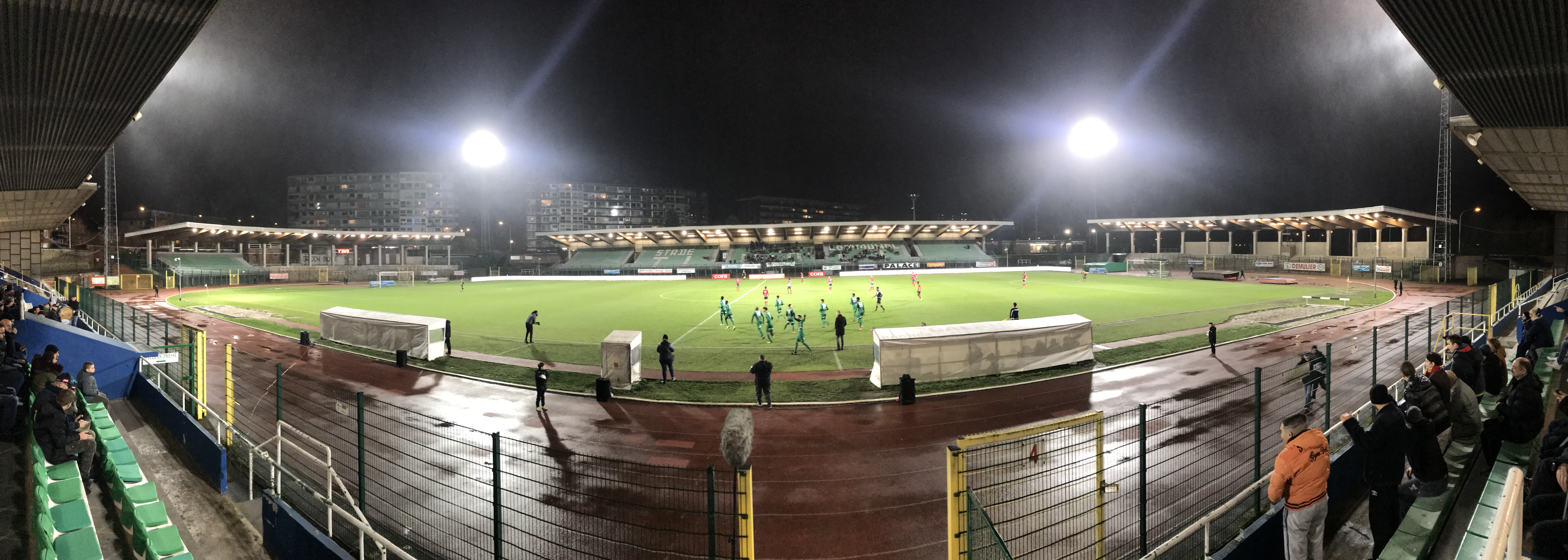
- Interactive map of Stade Communal du Tivoli
- Location: La Louvière, Belgium
- Capacity: 12,500
- Surface: Grass

Construction
- Opened: 1972

Tenants
- URLC; RAAL La Louvière (–2025)

The Stade Communal du Tivoli is a multi-use stadium in La Louvière, Belgium. It is currently used mostly for football matches. It was the former home ground of R.A.A. Louviéroise and RAAL La Louvière. The stadium holds 12,500 people and was built in 1972. UR La Louvière Centre are its current tenants.
