= Lore Jacobs =

Belgian footballer

Personal information
- Date of birth: 27 April 2005 (age 21)
- Place of birth: Belgium
- Position: Forward

Team information
- Current team: PSV
- Number: 17

Youth career
- VK Nederhasselt
- Olsa Brakel

Senior career*
| Years | Team | Apps | (Gls) |
| 2020–2022 | K.A.A Gent | 25 | (10) |
| 2022–2024 | RSC Anderlecht | 46 | (32) |
| 2024– | PSV | 6 | (0) |

International career^{‡}
| 2022–2023 | Belgium U19s | 15 | (7) |
| 2023 | Belgian U23s | 1 | (0) |
| 2025– | Belgium | 6 | (0) |
- * Club domestic league appearances and goals as of 18:10, 10 November 2024 (UTC) ‡ National team caps and goals as of 20:20, 15 October 2026 (UTC)

Lore Jacobs (born 27 April 2005) is a Belgian footballer who plays as a forward for PSV.

== Career ==
Jacobs made her league debut on 1 May 2021 against OH Leuven.

On 9 June 2022, Jacobs signed a multi-year contract with RSC Anderlecht. During her first season at Anderlecht, they won the league as champions, Anderlecht's sixth title in a row, and she was voted the Player of the Season. During Jacobs' second season at Anderlecht, they won the league as champions again, winning Anderlecht's seventh title in a row. On 23 May 2023, she signed a two-year contract extension with the club. During her time at the club, she scored 37 goals in 60 matches in all competitions.

On 7 June 2024, Jacobs was announced at PSV, signing a three-year contract with the club. This was the first time RSC Anderlecht had received a transfer fee for a player. She made her league debut against SC Telstar VVNH on 28 September 2024.

== International career ==
On 12 July 2023, Jacobs was called up to the Belgian U19s for the European Under 19 Championship.
