= Linda Natter =

Austrian footballer (born 2005)

Personal information
- Full name: Linda Mathilde Natter
- Date of birth: 12 May 2005 (age 21)
- Place of birth: Dornbirn, Austria
- Height: 1.68 m (5 ft 6 in)
- Position: Defender

Team information
- Current team: TSG Hoffenheim
- Number: 20

Youth career
- 2013-2020: SPG FC Mellau

Senior career*
Years	Team	Apps	(Gls)
2021–2024	SPG SCR Altach/FFC Vorderland	46	(33)
2024–2025	First Vienna FC	9	(3)
2025-	TSG Hoffenheim	17	(2)

International career^{‡}
2021–2022	Austria U17	12	(8)
2022–2024	Austria U19	21	(4)
2023	Austria U20	2	(0)
- * Club domestic league appearances and goals as of 14 November 2026 ‡ National team caps and goals as of 21 March 2019

Linda Natter (born 12 May 2005) is an Austrian football player who plays for TSG Hoffenheim.
