= Danique Tolhoek =

Dutch footballer (born 2005)

Personal information
- Date of birth: 17 March 2005 (age 21)
- Place of birth: Kapelle, Netherlands
- Position: Striker

Team information
- Current team: Eintracht Frankfurt
- Number: 22

Youth career
- 2009–2018: VV Kapelle
- 2018–2021: JVOZ
- 2021–2023: Ajax

Senior career*
Years	Team	Apps	(Gls)
2023–2026	Ajax	54	(33)
2026–	Eintracht Frankfurt	9	(3)

International career^{‡}
2021	Netherlands U16	2	(1)
2021–2022	Netherlands U17	11	(3)
2022–2024	Netherlands U19	28	(27)
2024–	Netherlands U23	14	(4)
2025–	Netherlands	1	(0)
Medal record
Women's football
Representing Netherlands
UEFA Women's Under-19 Championship
Runner-up	2024 Lithuania
- * Club domestic league appearances and goals as of 21 November 2026 ‡ National team caps and goals as of 12 October 2026

Danique Tolhoek (born 17 March 2005) is a Dutch professional footballer who plays as a striker for Frauen-Bundesliga club Eintracht Frankfurt and the Netherlands national team.

== Club career ==
Tolhoek started her youth career with VV Kapelle. She joined JVOZ in 2018, where she played with boys. In 2021, she moved to Ajax.

Tolhoek signed her first professional contract with Ajax in August 2023. She made her official debut for the club on 2 September 2023 as an 86th-minute substitute for Romée Leuchter in the 2023 supercup match against Twente. She scored her first goal for Ajax on 11 October 2023 in a 6–0 win against Zürich. In September 2024, she extended her contract with the club until June 2027.

On 30 June 2026, Tolhoek joined German club Eintracht Frankfurt on a three-year contract.

== International career ==
Tolhoek has represented Netherlands at youth international level. She was part of the Netherlands under-19 team which reached semi-finals of the 2023 UEFA Women's Under-19 Championship. She was also part of the team which finished as runners-up at the 2024 edition of the tournament. With 27 goals, she is the second all-time top scorer of the Netherlands under-19 team.

In June 2024, Tolhoek was called up to the Netherlands national team for a training camp. In November 2025, she received her first official call-up to the national team. She made her debut on 28 November 2025 in a 2–1 win against Portugal.

== Career statistics ==
=== Club ===
As of match played 21 November 2026

Appearances and goals by club, season and competition
Club	Season	League			National cup (Note: Includes KNVB Women's Cup, DFB-Pokal Frauen)		League cup		Continental		Other		Total	
Club	Season	Division	Apps	Goals	Apps	Goals	Apps	Goals	Apps	Goals	Apps	Goals	Apps	Goals
Ajax	2023–24	Vrouwen Eredivisie	18	4	2	2	1	0	6 (Note: Appearances in UEFA Women's Champions League)	1	1 (Note: Appearance in Dutch Women's Super Cup)	0	28	7
Ajax	2024–25	Vrouwen Eredivisie	22	19	1	0	0	0	2	0	1	0	26	19
Ajax	2025–26	Vrouwen Eredivisie	14	10	1	0	0	0	6 (Note: Appearances in UEFA Women's Europa Cup)	2	—		21	12
Ajax	Total		54	33	4	2	1	0	14	3	2	0	75	38
Eintracht Frankfurt	2026–27	Frauen-Bundesliga	9	3	2	2	—		5 (Note: Two appearances in UEFA Women's Champions League; three appearances in UEFA Women's Europa Cup)	0	—		16	5
Career total			63	36	6	4	1	0	19	3	2	0	91	43

=== International ===
As of match played 28 November 2025

Appearances and goals by national team and year
National team	Year	Apps	Goals
Netherlands	2025	1	0
Total		1	0

== Honours ==
Ajax

- KNVB Women's Cup: 2023–24

Netherlands U19

- UEFA Women's Under-19 Championship runner-up: 2024
