= Jella Veit =

German footballer (born 2005)

Personal information
- Date of birth: 3 May 2005 (age 21)
- Place of birth: Hamburg, Germany
- Height: 1.72 m (5 ft 8 in)
- Position: Centre-back

Team information
- Current team: Union Berlin
- Number: 30

Youth career
- SV Rugenbergen
- 2019–2021: Hamburger SV

Senior career*
| Years | Team | Apps | (Gls) |
| 2021–2023 | Eintracht Frankfurt II | 54 | (1) |
| 2023–2026 | Eintracht Frankfurt | 30 | (0) |
| 2026– | Union Berlin | 10 | (0) |

International career^{‡}
| 2019 | Germany U15 | 3 | (2) |
| 2021–2022 | Germany U17 | 23 | (4) |
| 2023 | Germany U19 | 13 | (1) |
| 2024 | Germany U20 | 11 | (1) |
| 2024– | Germany U23 | 11 | (0) |
| 2026– | Germany | 1 | (0) |
Medal record
Women's football
Representing Germany
UEFA Women's Under-19 Championship
| Silver medal – second place | 2023 Belgium |
- * Club domestic league appearances and goals as of 20 November 2026 ‡ National team caps and goals as of 15 October 2026

Jella Veit (born 3 May 2005) is a German professional footballer who plays as a centre-back for Frauen-Bundesliga club 1. FC Union Berlin and the Germany national team. She has previously played for Eintracht Frankfurt.

== Early life ==
Veit grew up in Bönningstedt, receiving an education at the Dietrich-Bonhoeffer-Gymnasium in Quickborn before moving to the more sports-focused Heidberg-Gymnasium in Langenhorn. The child of two former competitive swimmers, Veit originally participated in swimming, where she was once the fastest German 50-meter butterfly swimmer in her youth age group. She eventually switched completely to football and played for local club SV Rugenbergen. Veit, originally a defensive midfielder, spent most of her time with Rugenbergen playing on a boys' team and at an older age group. At age 14, she also started competing for Hamburger SV, using a dual playing license to compete for HSV and Rugenbergen simultaneously.

== Club career ==
=== Eintracht Frankfurt ===
On 30 June 2021, Veit joined Eintracht Frankfurt. She moved away from home and entered a junior boarding school, where she balanced academic commitments with playing for Frankfurt's second team in the 2. Frauen-Bundesliga. Over two years, she made 54 league appearances and scored one goal.

Veit signed her first professional contract with Eintracht Frankfurt in the summer of 2023. She then went on to make her Frauen-Bundesliga debut the same year. On 18 October 2023, she played in her first UEFA Women's Champions League match, coming on as a substitute in a shutout victory over AC Sparta Prague. In her first few seasons with the Frankfurt senior team, Veit was frequently named to matchday squads, but struggled to earn consistent playing time.

On 29 April 2025, Veit signed a contract extension with the club through 2026. The following transfer window in the summer of 2025 saw the departures of starting Frankfurt centre-backs Sophia Kleinherne and Sara Doorsoun, opening a window for Veit. She became a member of Frankfurt's starting defensive lineup at the start of the 2025–26 Frauen-Bundesliga, missing only one game in all competitions across the first half of the season. In that timeframe, she also sported the highest duel success rate of any player with at least 50 duels in the league. However, she lost her starting role in the second half of the season, with Sara Doorsoun and Amanda Ilestedt taking up the lion's share of minutes in central defense. After spending five years at Frankfurt, Veit chose to depart from the club upon the expiration of her contract in the summer of 2026.

=== Union Berlin ===
In June 2026, fellow Frauen-Bundesliga team 1. FC Union Berlin announced that they had signed Veit on a one-year deal.

== International career ==
=== Youth ===
Veit has garnered extensive experience with Germany's youth national teams. She started playing for the under-15 national team in 2019 and has gone on to represent her country at five different age groups. In 2022, she was a prominent contributor to the U17 squad's UEFA Women's Under-17 Championship win after captaining the side and appearing in all of the team's matches. She received the under-17 gold Fritz Walter Medal at the end of the year.

Two years later, Veit was a member of the squad that competed in the 2023 UEFA Women's Under-19 Championship. In the semifinals of the tournament, she scored a goal that kicked off a 3–2 comeback win over France. Germany were then eliminated by Spain on penalties in the final.

Veit was named to the U20 team that participated in the 2024 FIFA U-20 Women's World Cup. In the quarterfinal match, Germany appeared poised to beat the United States, 2–0, until a pair of goals in the final minutes of regulation pushed the game to extra time. The second goal, which occurred in the 90+8th minute, was an own goal conceded by Veit. In the ensuing penalty shootout, Veit atoned for her error by converting her team's opening spot-kick, but Germany lost the shootout and were eliminated from the competition. In October 2024, Veit won her second Fritz Walter Medal, the under-19 bronze.

=== Senior ===
In February 2026, Veit received her first call-up to the Germany senior national team, replacing the injured Sophia Kleinherne ahead of two 2027 FIFA Women's World Cup qualification matches. On 7 March 2026, she made her international debut, coming on as a second-half substitute for Janina Minge in a 4–0 victory over Norway.

== Career statistics ==
As of 7 March 2026

Appearances and goals by national team and year
| National team | Year | Apps | Goals |
|---|---|---|---|
| Germany | 2026 | 1 | 0 |
| Total | | 1 | 0 |

== Honours ==
Germany U17

- UEFA Women's Under-17 Championship: 2022

Germany U19

- UEFA Women's Under-19 Championship runner-up: 2023

Individual

- Fritz Walter Medal U17 Gold: 2022
- Fritz Walter Medal U19 Bronze: 2024
