= Alara Şehitler =

German footballer (born 2006)

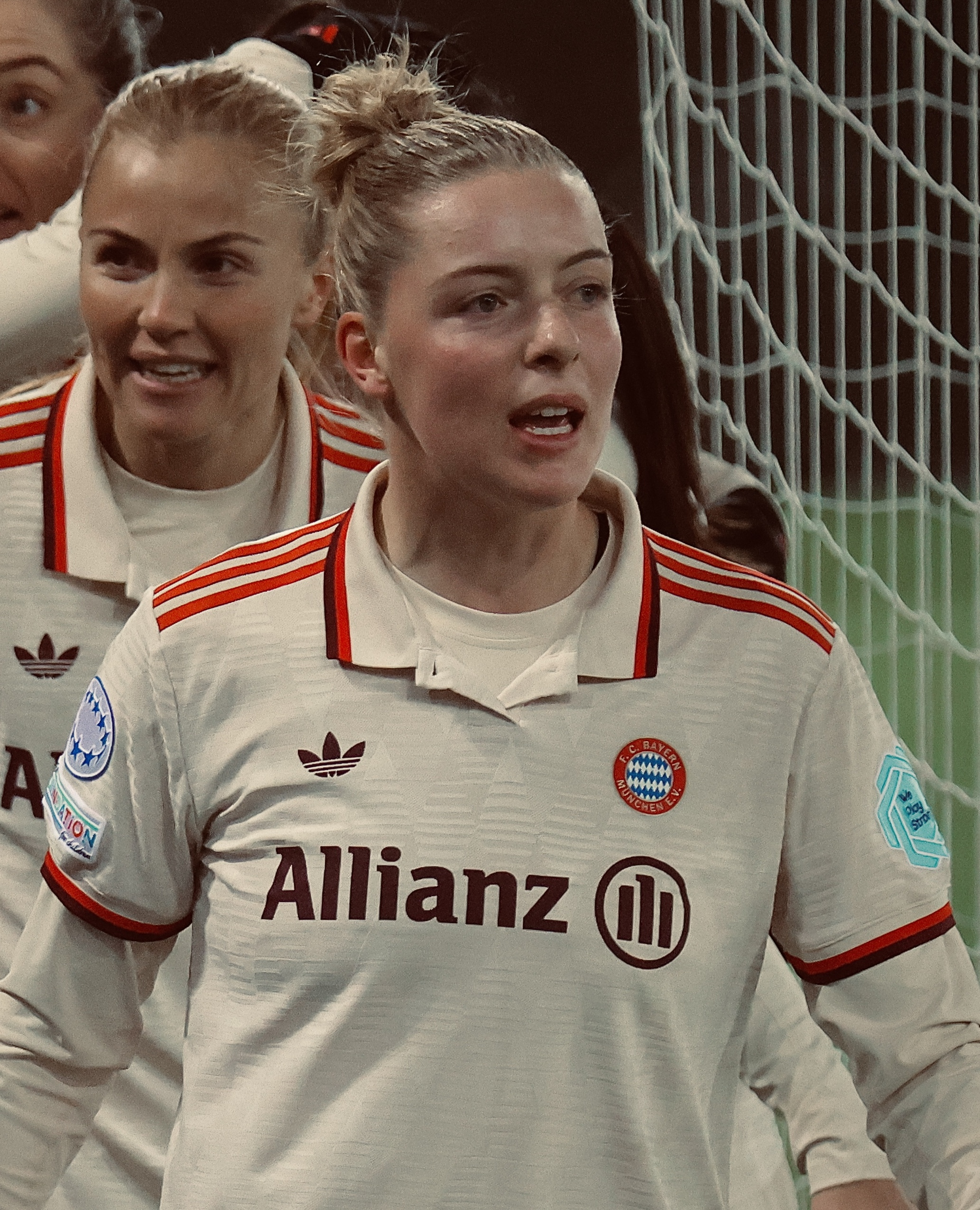
- Alara with Bayern Munich in 2024

Personal information
- Date of birth: 27 November 2006 (age 19)
- Place of birth: Weingarten, Württemberg, Germany
- Height: 1.74 m (5 ft 9 in)
- Position: Midfielder

Team information
- Current team: Bayern Munich
- Number: 14

Youth career
- –2023: FV Ravensburg

Senior career*
Years	Team	Apps	(Gls)
2023–2026	Bayern Munich II	10	(3)
2023–	Bayern Munich	44	(8)

International career^{‡}
2019	Germany U15	3	(1)
2021–2022	Germany U17	20	(8)
2023–	Germany U19	13	(7)
2024–	Germany U20	12	(2)
2025–	Germany U23	3	(2)
2024–	Germany	4	(0)
- * Club domestic league appearances and goals as of 14 November 2026 ‡ National team caps and goals as of 21:55, 15 October 2026 (UTC)

Alara Şehitler (born 27 November 2006), mononymously known as Alara, is a German professional footballer who plays as an attacking midfielder for Frauen-Bundesliga club Bayern Munich and the Germany national team.

== Club career ==
Alara began her footballing career at SG Aulendorf. As a youth player, she played for SV Weingarten and then joined the youth academy of FV Ravensburg, where she played for the boys' team.

On 13 February 2023, Bayern Munich announced the signing of Şehitler from Ravensburg for the following season on a two-year contract. She started her senior career with Bayern's reserve team, before playing for the first team shortly thereafter. Aged just 16, Alara made her Frauen-Bundesliga debut on 22 October during a 3–0 win at RB Leipzig and, in doing so, became Bayern's youngest-ever female player. On 14 February 2024, she scored her first competitive goal for Bayern in a 6–0 DFB-Pokal Frauen victory against Kickers Offenbach. Alara scored a stoppage time winner to register her first league goal on 20 October as Bayern Munich beat Bayer Leverkusen 3–2. On 12 March 2025, Alara extended her contract with Bayern Munich until 2027.

== International career ==
Born in Germany, Şehitler is of both Turkish and German descent. She helped the Germany under-17 national team win the 2022 UEFA Women's Under-17 Championship.

She reached the 2023 UEFA Women's Under-19 Championship final with Germany, losing on penalties to Spain to finish as runners-up. Şehitler scored twice at the tournament and her strong performances earned her an inclusion in the Team of the Tournament. In September 2023, it was announced that she had won the under-17 Fritz Walter Gold Medal.

On 29 November 2024, Alara debuted for the Germany senior national team during a 6–0 away friendly win over Switzerland. In October 2025, she won a second Fritz Walter Gold Medal, this time in the under-19 age group, for her impressive performances over the past season.

== Style of play ==
Şehitler plays as a midfielder, specifically as an attacking midfielder. A left-footed player, Alara is known for her creativity, smooth touches, dribbling and passing skills and her powerful left-footed shots and freekicks.

== Personal life ==
In late 2024, Alara expressed her desire to remove her last name from her jersey and instead use her first name ("Alara") on the back of her football shirts, due to tasteless jokes and puns surrounding the sound and pronunciation of her second name. The application was quickly approved by UEFA, and thus Alara began playing matches for both club and country with her first name on her jersey at the beginning of 2025. The decision saw her become the first player to use only her first name on her DFB jersey.

== Career statistics ==
=== Club ===
As of match played 19 November 2026

Appearances and goals by club, season and competition
Club	Season	League			National Cup (Note: Include DFB Pokal)		Continental (Note: Includes UEFA Champions League)		Other (Note: Includes DFB-Supercup)		Total	
Club	Season	Division	Apps	Goals	Apps	Goals	Apps	Goals	Apps	Goals	Apps	Goals
Bayern Munich II	2023–24	2. Frauen-Bundesliga	9	3	–		–		–		9	3
Bayern Munich II	2025–26	2. Frauen-Bundesliga	1	0	–		–		–		1	0
Bayern Munich II	Total		10	3	0	0	0	0	0	0	10	3
Bayern Munich	2023–24	Frauen-Bundesliga	3	0	2	1	1	0	–		6	1
Bayern Munich	2024–25	Frauen-Bundesliga	16	3	2	0	5	1	0	0	23	4
Bayern Munich	2025–26	Frauen-Bundesliga	16	3	2	0	6	1	1	0	25	4
Bayern Munich	2026–27	Frauen-Bundesliga	9	2	2	0	3	1	1	0	15	3
Bayern Munich	Total		44	8	8	1	15	3	2	0	69	12
Career total			54	11	8	1	15	3	2	0	79	15

=== International ===
As of 28 November 2025

Appearances and goals by national team and year
National team	Year	Apps	Goals
Germany	2024	1	0
Germany	2025	3	0
Total		4	0

== Honours ==
Bayern Munich

- Frauen-Bundesliga: 2023–24, 2024–25, 2025–26
- DFB-Pokal: 2024–25, 2025–26
- DFB-Supercup Frauen: 2025, 2026

Germany U17

- UEFA Women's Under-17 Championship: 2022

Germany U19

- UEFA Women's Under-19 Championship runner-up: 2023

Individual

- Fritz Walter Medal U17 Gold: 2023
- Fritz Walter Medal U19 Gold: 2025
- UEFA Women's Under-19 Championship Team of the Tournament: 2023
