= Lotte Keukelaar =

Dutch footballer (born 2005)

Personal information
- Full name: Lotte Jasmijn Keukelaar
- Date of birth: 25 September 2005 (age 21)
- Place of birth: Vleuten, Netherlands
- Position: Forward

Team information
- Current team: Real Madrid
- Number: 7

Youth career
- –2019: PVCV Vleuten
- 2019–2023: Ajax

Senior career*
Years	Team	Apps	(Gls)
2023–2025	Ajax	38	(6)
2025–	Real Madrid	9	(1)

International career^{‡}
2021	Netherlands U16	2	(1)
2021–2022	Netherlands U17	9	(4)
2022–2024	Netherlands U19	33	(14)
2025–	Netherlands U23	4	(2)
2024–	Netherlands	9	(2)
Medal record
Women's football
Representing Netherlands
UEFA Women's Under-19 Championship
Runner-up	2024 Lithuania
- * Club domestic league appearances and goals as of 31 August 2026 ‡ National team caps and goals as of 13 October 2026

Lotte Jasmijn Keukelaar (born 25 September 2005) is a Dutch professional footballer who plays as a forward for Liga F club Real Madrid and the Netherlands national team.

== Early life ==
Keukelaar was born on 25 September 2005 in Vleuten and has two sisters. Growing up in Vleuten, she then attended the University of Amsterdam in the Netherlands, where she studied English literature.

== Club career ==
As a youth player, Keukelaar joined the youth academy of PVCV Vleuten. In 2019, she joined the youth academy of Ajax, where she started her senior career.

On 18 August 2023, Keukelaar signed her first contract with Ajax until mid-2025. On 15 September 2023, she made her debut for Ajax in the away match against Excelsior by filling in for Chasity Grant. Keukelaar then also made her debut in the selection for the Champions League. During the 2023–24 season, she helped the club achieve second place in the league and win that season's KNVB Cup.

Keukelaar scored her first goal in the Eredivisie on 27 January 2024 in a home game against Fortuna Sittard. Three days later, she and her team pulled a 2–1 victory over AS Roma in the Champions League. Keukelaar's development was rewarded with the signing of a new improved contract to keep her with Ajax until mid-2027.

On 19 September 2025, Keukelaar joined Real Madrid for a record amount in Dutch women's football. She signed a contract for five years.

== International career ==
In her youth, Keukelaar played for the Netherlands U15 and U17 in 2021 and 2002. Keukelaar played for the Netherlands national U19 team at the 2024 UEFA Under-19 Championship, helping the team achieve second place at the tournament.

On 25 October 2024, she debuted for the Netherlands national team during a 15–0 home friendly win over the Indonesia, where she scored two goals and recorded two assists.

== Career statistics ==
=== International ===
As of match played 13 October 2026

Appearances and goals by national team and year
National team	Year	Apps	Goals
Netherlands	2024	3	2
Netherlands	2025	2	0
Netherlands	2026	4	0
Total		9	2

Scores and results list Netherlands' goal tally first, score column indicates score after each Keukelaar goal.

List of international goals scored by Lotte Keukelaar
No.	Date	Venue	Opponent	Score	Result	Competition
1	25 October 2024	De Vijverberg, Doetinchem, Netherlands	Indonesia	6–0	15–0	Friendly
2	25 October 2024	De Vijverberg, Doetinchem, Netherlands	Indonesia	9–0	15–0	Friendly

== Honours ==
Netherlands U19

- UEFA Women's Under-19 Championship runner-up: 2024

Individual

- UEFA Women's Under-19 Championship Team of the Tournament: 2023, 2024
