= 2023 UEFA Women's Under-19 Championship qualification =

Tournament details
- Dates: Round 1: 4 October – 14 November 2022; Round 2: 1 – 11 April 2023
- Teams: 52 (from 1 confederation)

Tournament statistics
- Matches played: 144
- Goals scored: 572 (3.97 per match)
- Top scorer(s): (Serbia) Nina Matejić (10 goals)

The 2023 UEFA Women's Under-19 Championship qualifying competition was a women's under-19 football competition that determined the seven teams joining the automatically qualified hosts Belgium in the 2023 UEFA Women's Under-19 Championship final tournament.

52 teams, including hosts Belgium, entered the qualifying competition. Players born on or after 1 January 2004 were eligible to participate.

Gibraltar entered a women's national team in any UEFA competition for the first time ever.

== Format ==
Last season, UEFA implemented a new format for the women's U17 and U19 Euros, based on a league-style qualifying format.

The teams were divided in two leagues: League A (28 teams) and League B (24 teams).

Each league played two rounds:

- Round 1: In each league, groups of four teams played mini-tournaments. The winners of each mini-tournament in league B and the best runner-up were promoted and the last-placed teams in league A mini-tournaments were relegated.
- Round 2: The seven winners of League A qualified for the final tournament. The six winners of mini-tournaments in league B and the best runner-up were promoted and the last-placed teams in league A were relegated for Round 1 of the next edition of the tournament.

=== Tiebreakers ===
In Round 1 and Round 2, teams were ranked according to points (3 points for a win, 1 point for a draw, 0 points for a loss), and if tied on points, the following tiebreaking criteria were applied, in the order given, to determine the rankings (Regulations Articles 19.01 and 19.02):

1. Points in head-to-head matches among tied teams;
2. Goal difference in head-to-head matches among tied teams;
3. Goals scored in head-to-head matches among tied teams;
4. If more than two teams were tied, and after applying all head-to-head criteria above, a subset of teams were still tied, all head-to-head criteria above were reapplied exclusively to this subset of teams;
5. Goal difference in all group matches;
6. Goals scored in all group matches;
7. Penalty shoot-out if only two teams had the same number of points, and they met in the last round of the group and were tied after applying all criteria above (not used if more than two teams had the same number of points, or if their rankings were not relevant for qualification for the next stage);
8. Disciplinary points (red card = 3 points, yellow card = 1 point, expulsion for two yellow cards in one match = 3 points);
9. Position in the applicable ranking:
  1. for teams in round 1, position in 2021–22 round 2 league rankings;
  2. for teams in round 2, position in the round 1 league ranking.

To determine the five best third-placed teams from the qualifying round, the results against the teams in fourth place were discarded. The following criteria were applied (Regulations Article 15.01):

1. Points;
2. Goal difference;
3. Goals scored;
4. Disciplinary points;
5. Position in the applicable ranking:
  1. for teams in round 1, position in the coefficient rankings;
  2. for teams in round 2, position in the round 1 league ranking.

== Round 1 ==
=== Draw ===
The draw for the qualifying round was held on 31 May 2022, at the UEFA headquarters in Nyon, Switzerland.

The teams were seeded according to their final group standings of the 2021–22 competition (Regulations Article 13.01).

Each group contained one team from Pot A, one team from Pot B, one team from Pot C, and one team from Pot D. For political reasons, Armenia and Azerbaijan and Bosnia & Herzegovina and Kosovo would not be drawn in the same group.

To determine the 2021–22 Round 2 league rankings, the following criteria was followed:

1. higher position in the following classification:
  1. League A Round 2 group winners
  2. League A Round 2 group runners-up
  3. League A Round 2 third-placed teams
  4. Teams promoted from League B
  5. Teams relegated from League A
  6. League B Round 2 runners-up
  7. League B Round 2 third-placed teams
  8. League B Round 2 fourth-placed teams
2. higher number of points in all mini-tournament matches;
3. superior goal difference in all mini-tournament matches;
4. higher number of goals scored in all mini-tournament matches;
5. lower disciplinary points (red card = 3 points, yellow card = 1 point, expulsion for two yellow cards in one match = 3 points);
6. higher position in the 2021–22 round 1 league rankings.

Teams entering League A

Pot 1
Team	Pos.	Pts.	GD	GS	DP
France	1 (A)	3	3	3	0
England	1 (A)	3	3	3	1
Italy	1 (A)	3	2	3	
Sweden	1 (A)	3	2	2	
Norway	1 (A)	3	1	1	
Spain	1 (A)	1	0	2	
Germany	1 (A)	1	0	1	

Pot 2
Team	Pos.	Pts.	GD	GS	DP
Netherlands	2 (A)	1	0	2	
Finland	2 (A)	1	0	1	
Austria	2 (A)	0	–1	0	
Hungary	2 (A)	0	–2	1	
Denmark	2 (A)	0	–2	0	
Republic of Ireland	2 (A)	0	–3	0	0
Belgium	2 (A)	0	–3	0	–2

Pot 3
Team	Pos.	Pts.	GD	GS
Wales	3 (A)	4	–2	2
Switzerland	3 (A)	3	4	9
Poland	3 (A)	3	0	9
Greece	3 (A)	3	–2	3
Portugal	3 (A)	3	–6	3
Ukraine	3 (A)	1	–6	0
Slovakia	1 (B)	9	18	18

Pot 4
Team	Pos.	Pts.	GD	GS
Scotland	1 (B)	9	10	13
Slovenia	1 (B)	9	10	11
Serbia	1 (B)	9	10	10
Israel	1 (B)	9	6	7
Northern Ireland	1 (B)	7	6	7
Malta	2 (B)	7	2	6
Turkey	2 (B)	6	8	13

Teams entering League B

Pot 1
Team	Pos.	Pts.	GD	GS
Bulgaria	4 (A)	1	–10	0
Iceland	4 (A)	0	–4	1
Czech Republic	4 (A)	0	–8	2
Croatia	4 (A)	0	–12	0
Bosnia and Herzegovina	4 (A)	0	–15	1
Romania	4 (A)	0	–16	1
Belarus	4 (A)			

Pot 2
Team	Pos.	Pts.	GD	GS
North Macedonia	2 (B)	6	2	4
Kosovo	2 (B)	6	1	6
Andorra	2 (B)	6	–3	4
Lithuania	2 (B)	4	–1	1
Latvia	3 (B)	4	–3	1
Azerbaijan	3 (B)	3	0	3
Moldova	3 (B)	3	–1	5

Pot 3
Team	Pos.	Pts.	GD	GS	DP
Georgia	3 (B)	3	–3	2	4
Kazakhstan	3 (B)	3	–3	2	8
Albania	3 (B)	3	–8	3	
Cyprus	4 (B)	0	–6	2	
Montenegro	4 (B)	0	–6	0	
Faroe Islands	4 (B)	0	–8	2	0
Estonia	4 (B)	0	–8	2	6
Liechtenstein	4 (B)	0	–11	1	
Armenia	4 (B)	0	–12	1	
Gibraltar	DNP				

=== League A ===
All the matches were played between 4 October and 15 November 2022.

==== Group A1 ====
Pos	Team	Pld	W	D	L	GF	GA	GD	Pts	Promotion
1	Spain	3	3	0	0	15	0	+15	9	Transfer to Round 2 (League A)
2	Finland	3	2	0	1	7	2	+5	6	Transfer to Round 2 (League A)
3	Switzerland	3	1	0	2	3	9	−6	3	Transfer to Round 2 (League A)
4	Scotland (H)	3	0	0	3	0	14	−14	0	Relegated to Round 2 (League B)

Source: UEFA
Rules for classification: Qualification tiebreakers
(H) Hosts
5 October 2022
14:00

Switzerland	0–2	Finland
	Report	Sevenius 47'; Schlup 52' (o.g.)

Ainslie Park, Edinburgh
Referee: Lucie Šulcová (Czech Republic)
5 October 2022
19:00

Spain	6–0	Scotland
Baradad 2'; Moral 39', 43'; Bartel 55'; González 83'; Carbonell 90'	Report

Ainslie Park, Edinburgh
Referee: Kristina Georgieva (Bulgaria)

8 October 2022
12:00

Finland	5–0	Scotland
Antikainen 10'; Viinikka 13'; Sevenius 19'; Seiro 54'; Perkaus 79'	Report

Ainslie Park, Edinburgh
Referee: Lucie Šulcová (Czech Republic)
8 October 2022
20:00

Spain	7–0	Switzerland
Fernández 3'; González 10', 18'; Fiamma 15'; Laborde 27' (pen.); Vélez Ortiz 60', 82'	Report

Ainslie Park, Edinburgh
Referee: Sabina Bolić (Croatia)

11 October 2022
14:00

Scotland	0–3	Switzerland
	Report	von Felten 3'; Vallotto 24'; Tramezzani 40' (pen.)

Ainslie Park, Edinburgh
Referee: Kristina Georgieva (Bulgaria)
11 October 2022
14:00

Finland	0–2	Spain
	Report	González 30'; Moral 60'

Falkirk Stadium, Falkirk
Referee: Sabina Bolić (Croatia)

==== Group A2 ====
Pos	Team	Pld	W	D	L	GF	GA	GD	Pts	Promotion
1	Netherlands	3	2	1	0	9	1	+8	7	Transfer to Round 2 (League A)
2	Sweden	3	2	0	1	3	2	+1	6	Transfer to Round 2 (League A)
3	Greece (H)	3	1	1	1	3	3	0	4	Transfer to Round 2 (League A)
4	Turkey	3	0	0	3	0	9	−9	0	Relegated to Round 2 (League B)

Source: UEFA
Rules for classification: Qualification tiebreakers
(H) Hosts
4 October 2022
14:00

Greece	1–1	Netherlands
Giannaka 34'	Report	Keukelaar 78'

Pampeloponnisiako Stadium, Patras
Referee: Katalin Sipos (Hungary)
4 October 2022
15:00

Sweden	1–0	Turkey
Svanström 45' (pen.)	Report

Pampeloponnisiako Stadium, Patras
Referee: Jelena Medjedovic (Serbia)

7 October 2022
11:30

Netherlands	6–0	Turkey
Keukelaar 6', 39'; Huizenga 36'; van Gool 52'; van Oosten 55'; Tolhoek 63'	Report

Pampeloponnisiako Stadium, Patras
Referee: Katalin Sipos (Hungary)
7 October 2022
15:00

Sweden	2–0	Greece
Nildén 22'; Svanström 52'	Report

Pampeloponnisiako Stadium, Patras
Referee: Veronika Kovarova (Czech Republic)

10 October 2022
11:00

Netherlands	2–0	Sweden
Noordman 43'; Thomas 77'	Report

Papacharalambeio Ethniko Stadio Nafpaktou, Nafpaktos
Referee: Veronika Kovarova (Czech Republic)
10 October 2022
11:00

Turkey	0–2	Greece
	Report	Giannaka 63'; Saridaki 83'

Pampeloponnisiako Stadium, Patras
Referee: Jelena Medjedovic (Serbia)

==== Group A3 ====
Pos	Team	Pld	W	D	L	GF	GA	GD	Pts	Promotion
1	Serbia	3	2	1	0	10	6	+4	7	Transfer to Round 2 (League A)
2	Italy	3	2	1	0	7	4	+3	7	Transfer to Round 2 (League A)
3	Hungary (H)	3	1	0	2	6	6	0	3	Transfer to Round 2 (League A)
4	Wales	3	0	0	3	3	10	−7	0	Relegated to Round 2 (League B)

Source: UEFA
Rules for classification: Qualification tiebreakers
(H) Hosts
5 October 2022
15:00

Wales	0–3	Hungary
	Report	Siber 24' (pen.), 84'; Tuza 45+1'

Globall Football Park, Telki
Referee: Rasa Grigonė (Lithuania)
5 October 2022
15:00

Italy	2–2	Serbia
Pavan 22'; Beccari 79'	Report	Matejić 55', 76'

Bicskei Sportpálya, Bicske
Referee: Maria Ennsgraber (Austria)

8 October 2022
14:30

Hungary	2–4	Serbia
Gaković 3' (o.g.); Kiss-Lantos 74'	Report	Matejić 35', 59', 86'; Jestrović 55'

Globall Football Park, Telki
Referee: Rasa Grigonė (Lithuania)
8 October 2022
14:30

Italy	3–1	Wales
Schatzer 30'; Pfattner 36' (pen.); Petrara 90'	Report	Poole 4'

Grosics Gyula Stadion, Tatabánya
Referee: Sílvia Domingos (Portugal)

11 October 2022
15:30

Serbia	4–2	Wales
Stokić 10'; Matejić 11', 85'; Obradović 51'	Report	Poole 30'; Teisar 40'

Bicskei Sportpálya, Bicske
Referee: Maria Ennsgraber (Austria)
11 October 2022
15:30

Hungary	1–2	Italy
Molnár 9'	Report	Beccari 17', 48'

Globall Football Park, Telki
Referee: Sílvia Domingos (Portugal)

==== Group A4 ====
Pos	Team	Pld	W	D	L	GF	GA	GD	Pts	Promotion
1	Denmark	3	2	1	0	11	2	+9	7	Transfer to Round 2 (League A)
2	England	3	2	1	0	9	1	+8	7	Transfer to Round 2 (League A)
3	Slovenia	3	1	0	2	2	10	−8	3	Transfer to Round 2 (League A)
4	Slovakia (H)	3	0	0	3	2	11	−9	0	Relegated to Round 2 (League B)

Source: UEFA
Rules for classification: Qualification tiebreakers
(H) Hosts
5 October 2022
12:00

England	5–0	Slovenia
Thompson 2' (pen.); Godfrey 5', 52'; McLoughlin 29'; Jupp 87'	Report

Spišská Nová Ves Stadium, Spišská Nová Ves
Referee: Alina Peşu (Romania)
5 October 2022
17:00

Slovakia	1–6	Denmark
Surová 60'	Report	Sørensen 22' (pen.); Ásgeirsdóttir 33', 39', 56', 86' (pen.); Habibovic 69'

The National Training Centre, Poprad
Referee: Ainara Acevedo (Spain)

8 October 2022
12:00

Denmark	4–0	Slovenia
Sørensen 37'; Vistisen 56'; La Cour 82', 90+4'	Report

Spišská Nová Ves Stadium, Spišská Nová Ves
Referee: Ainara Acevedo (Spain)
8 October 2022
17:00

England	3–0	Slovakia
Bayerová 3' (o.g.); Hennessy 52'; Barry 77'	Report

The National Training Centre, Poprad
Referee: Volha Tsiareshka (Belarus)

11 October 2022
14:00

Slovenia	2–1	Slovakia
Kajzba 27'; Eferl 59'	Report	Iľková 26'

The National Training Centre, Poprad
Referee: Alina Peşu (Romania)
11 October 2022
14:00

Denmark	1–1	England
Jørgensen 68'	Report	Simpson 59'

Spišská Nová Ves Stadium, Spišská Nová Ves
Referee: Volha Tsiareshka (Belarus)

==== Group A5 ====
Pos	Team	Pld	W	D	L	GF	GA	GD	Pts	Promotion
1	France	3	3	0	0	9	2	+7	9	Transfer to Round 2 (League A)
2	Poland (H)	3	1	1	1	10	4	+6	4	Transfer to Round 2 (League A)
3	Republic of Ireland	3	1	1	1	2	2	0	4	Transfer to Round 2 (League A)
4	Northern Ireland	3	0	0	3	1	14	−13	0	Relegated to Round 2 (League B)

Source: UEFA
Rules for classification: Qualification tiebreakers
(H) Hosts
4 October 2022
11:00

France	5–1	Northern Ireland
Haugou 39', 62'; Sylla 50'; Hurtré 90'; Ribadeira 90+2' (pen.)	Report	Halliday 3'

Swarzędz, Swarzędz
Referee: Catarina Campos (Portugal)
4 October 2022
14:00

Poland	1–1	Republic of Ireland
Sobal 62'	Report	Stapleton 57' (pen.)

Plewiska Stadium, Plewiska
Referee: Jelena Pejković (Croatia)

7 October 2022
11:00

Republic of Ireland	1–0	Northern Ireland
Doherty 20'	Report

Swarzędz, Swarzędz
Referee: Jelena Pejković (Croatia)
7 October 2022
14:00

France	3–1	Poland
Ribadeira 11', 90+2' (pen.); Ndongala 43'	Report	Rohn 71'

Plewiska Stadium, Plewiska
Referee: Eleni Antoniou (Greece)

10 October 2022
14:00

Republic of Ireland	0–1	France
	Report	Hurtré 42' (pen.)

MGKS Huragan, Pobiedziska
Referee: Eleni Antoniou (Greece)
10 October 2022
14:00

Northern Ireland	0–8	Poland
	Report	Rohn 3', 19'; Sobal 28', 38', 49'; Katowicz 54'; Duchnowska 84', 89'

Plewiska Stadium, Plewiska
Referee: Catarina Campos (Portugal)

==== Group A6 ====
Pos	Team	Pld	W	D	L	GF	GA	GD	Pts	Promotion
1	Austria	3	2	1	0	6	3	+3	7	Transfer to Round 2 (League A)
2	Germany	3	2	0	1	8	3	+5	6	Transfer to Round 2 (League A)
3	Ukraine	3	0	2	1	2	3	−1	2	Transfer to Round 2 (League A)
4	Israel (H)	3	0	1	2	1	8	−7	1	Relegated to Round 2 (League B)

Source: UEFA
Rules for classification: Qualification tiebreakers
(H) Hosts
8 November 2022
11:00

Ukraine	1–1	Austria
Molodiuk 34'	Report	Ojukwu 23'

National team complex, Shefayim
Referee: Henrikke Nervik (Norway)
8 November 2022
16:00

Germany	5–0	Israel
Kett 10', 40'; Brengel 15'; Acikgöz 44'; Grincenco 68'	Report

Ramat Gan Stadium, Ramat Gan
Referee: Réka Molnar (Hungary)

11 November 2022
10:00

Germany	2–1	Ukraine
Fröhlich 81'; Zicai 90+1'	Report	Radionova 54'

National team complex, Shefayim
Referee: Viola Raudziņa (Latvia)
11 November 2022
12:00

Austria	3–1	Israel
Roduner 18', 49'; Schöfberger 44'	Report	Sommer 45+1'

Ramat Gan Stadium, Ramat Gan
Referee: Henrikke Nervik (Norway)

14 November 2022
14:00

Austria	2–1	Germany
Mädl 2'; Holl 76'	Report	Zicai 74'

National team complex, Shefayim
Referee: Viola Raudziņa (Latvia)
14 November 2022
14:00

Israel	0–0	Ukraine
	Report

Ramat Gan Stadium, Ramat Gan
Referee: Réka Molnar (Hungary)

==== Group A7 ====
Pos	Team	Pld	W	D	L	GF	GA	GD	Pts	Promotion
1	Norway	3	2	1	0	13	2	+11	7	Transfer to Round 2 (League A)
2	Portugal (H)	3	2	0	1	7	2	+5	6	Transfer to Round 2 (League A)
3	Belgium	3	1	1	1	8	2	+6	4	Transfer to Round 2 (League A)
4	Malta	3	0	0	3	0	22	−22	0	Relegated to Round 2 (League B)

Source: UEFA
Rules for classification: Qualification tiebreakers
(H) Hosts
5 October 2022
15:00

Norway	10–0	Malta
Birkelund 8', 17', 67'; Gaupset 21'; Gatt 24' (o.g.); Sesay 42', 84'; Røn 43', 52'; Veum 77'	Report

Sport Complex of Tocha, Tocha
Referee: Jelena Cvetković (Serbia)
5 October 2022
18:00

Portugal	1–0	Belgium
Martins 90+4'	Report

Estádio Municipal Sérgio Conceição, Coimbra
Referee: Lizzy van Der Helm (Netherlands)

8 October 2022
14:45

Belgium	7–0	Malta
Jacobs 5', 39', 45+3', 81'; Rosala 50'; van Gansbeke 57'; Bosteels 75'	Report

Estádio Municipal Sérgio Conceição, Coimbra
Referee: Lizzy van Der Helm (Netherlands)
8 October 2022
17:45

Norway	2–1	Portugal
Tandberg 10'; Gaupset 73'	Report	Martins 61'

Sport Complex of Tocha, Tocha
Referee: Abigail Marriott (England)

11 October 2022
16:00

Malta	0–5	Portugal
	Report	Simas 23' (pen.); Ferreira 40', 83', 88'; Nogueira 45'

Estádio Municipal Sérgio Conceição, Coimbra
Referee: Jelena Cvetković (Serbia)
11 October 2022
16:00

Belgium	1–1	Norway
Taillieu 77'	Report	Kyvåg 38'

Sport Complex of Tocha, Tocha
Referee: Abigail Marriott (England)

=== League B ===
All the matches were played between 4 October and 15 November 2022.

==== Group B1 ====
Pos	Team	Pld	W	D	L	GF	GA	GD	Pts	Promotion
1	Croatia (H)	3	3	0	0	7	0	+7	9	Promotion to Round 2 (League A)
2	Montenegro	3	2	0	1	3	6	−3	6	Transfer to Round 2 (League B)
3	Cyprus	3	1	0	2	4	2	+2	3	Transfer to Round 2 (League B)
4	Azerbaijan	3	0	0	3	1	7	−6	0	Transfer to Round 2 (League B)

Source: UEFA
Rules for classification: Qualification tiebreakers
(H) Hosts
4 October 2022
12:00

Croatia	1–0	Cyprus
Ivandić 86'	Report

Stadion Aldo Drosina, Pula
Referee: Kirsty Dowle (England)
4 October 2022
12:00

Montenegro	2–1	Azerbaijan
Stanić 29'; Rakočević 76'	Report	Mutlu 17'

Stadion Veli Joze, Poreč
Referee: Marisca Overtoom (Netherlands)

7 October 2022
11:00

Croatia	5–0	Montenegro
Blažević 20'; Živković 71'; Iljkić 81'; Mikulica 82'; Šaban 90'	Report

Stadion Aldo Drosina, Pula
Referee: Victoria Beyer (France)
7 October 2022
15:30

Azerbaijan	0–4	Cyprus
	Report	Kyriakidi 16', 59'; Stylianou 52'; Sofocleous 66'

Stadion Veli Joze, Poreč
Referee: Marisca Overtoom (Netherlands)

10 October 2022
11:00

Azerbaijan	0–1	Croatia
	Report	Mikulica 45+1'

Stadion Aldo Drosina, Pula
Referee: Victoria Beyer (France)
10 October 2022
11:00

Cyprus	0–1	Montenegro
	Report	Malesija 7'

Stadion Veli Joze, Poreč
Referee: Kirsty Dowle (England)

==== Group B2 ====
Pos	Team	Pld	W	D	L	GF	GA	GD	Pts	Promotion
1	Romania	3	3	0	0	11	0	+11	9	Promotion to Round 2 (League A)
2	Albania (H)	3	2	0	1	4	3	+1	6	Transfer to Round 2 (League B)
3	Latvia	3	1	0	2	14	4	+10	3	Transfer to Round 2 (League B)
4	Armenia	3	0	0	3	0	22	−22	0	Transfer to Round 2 (League B)

Source: UEFA
Rules for classification: Qualification tiebreakers
(H) Hosts
5 October 2022
12:00

Romania	8–0	Armenia
Horváth 6', 58'; Jivan 7'; Borodi 35'; Bratu 45'; Pînzariu 55'; Botojel 69'; Sigheartău 90+3'	Report

Arena Egnatia, Rrogozhinë
Referee: María Martínez (Spain)
5 October 2022
14:30

Albania	3–1	Latvia
Borci 9'; Fucia 20'; Kodra 24'	Report	Ušpaleviča 90+2'

Elbasan Arena, Elbasan
Referee: Viki de Cremer (Belgium)

8 October 2022
12:00

Latvia	13–0	Armenia
Ušpaleviča 14'; Ansone 15', 20', 37'; Vuškāne 42', 47'; Saule 45', 45+7'; Kozlova 50'; Ščuka 59'; Lipšāne 67'; Paidere 90+1', 90+4'	Report

Arena Egnatia, Rrogozhinë
Referee: Viki de Cremer (Belgium)
8 October 2022
14:30

Romania	2–0	Albania
Borodi 11'; Horváth 18'	Report

Elbasan Arena, Elbasan
Referee: Ewa Augustyn (Poland)

11 October 2022
14:30

Armenia	0–1	Albania
	Report	Harutyunyan 67' (o.g.)

Elbasan Arena, Elbasan
Referee: María Martínez (Spain)
11 October 2022
14:30

Latvia	0–1	Romania
	Report	Horváth 10'

Arena Egnatia, Rrogozhinë
Referee: Ewa Augustyn (Poland)

==== Group B3 ====
Pos	Team	Pld	W	D	L	GF	GA	GD	Pts	Promotion
1	Iceland	3	3	0	0	15	0	+15	9	Promotion to Round 2 (League A)
2	Faroe Islands	3	2	0	1	7	5	+2	6	Transfer to Round 2 (League B)
3	Lithuania (H)	3	0	1	2	1	6	−5	1	Transfer to Round 2 (League B)
4	Liechtenstein	3	0	1	2	0	12	−12	1	Transfer to Round 2 (League B)

Source: UEFA
Rules for classification: Qualification tiebreakers
(H) Hosts
8 November 2022
10:00

Iceland	8–0	Liechtenstein
Sigurjónsdóttir 9', 34', 35'; V. Kristjánsdóttir 22', 56'; Tryggvadóttir 45'; Héðinsdóttir Gonzalez 65'; Jörundsdóttir 84'	Report

LFF Stadium, Vilnius
Referee: Minka Vekkeli (Finland)
8 November 2022
15:00

Faroe Islands	3–1	Lithuania
Haraldsen 44', 59'; Sørensen 61'	Report	Petrauskaitė 82'

LFF Stadium, Vilnius
Referee: Caroline Lanssens (Belgium)

11 November 2022
10:00

Iceland	4–0	Faroe Islands
Héðinsdóttir Gonzalez 29'; Jörundsdóttir 45'; Heiðarsdóttir 77'; Ágústsdóttir 89'	Report

LFF Stadium, Vilnius
Referee: Katarzyna Lisiecka-Sęk (Poland)
11 November 2022
15:00

Lithuania	0–0	Liechtenstein
	Report

LFF Stadium, Vilnius
Referee: Caroline Lanssens (Belgium)

14 November 2022
10:00

Lithuania	0–3	Iceland
	Report	Heiðarsdóttir 64'; Švarcaitė 67' (o.g.); Fjelsted 73'

LFF Stadium, Vilnius
Referee: Katarzyna Lisiecka-Sęk (Poland)
14 November 2022
15:00

Liechtenstein	0–4	Faroe Islands
	Report	Haraldsen 15', 58'; Olsen 79'; Johannesen 89'

LFF Stadium, Vilnius
Referee: Minka Vekkeli (Finland)

==== Group B4 ====
Pos	Team	Pld	W	D	L	GF	GA	GD	Pts	Promotion
1	Bosnia and Herzegovina (H)	2	2	0	0	10	4	+6	6	Promotion to Round 2 (League A)
2	Moldova	2	1	0	1	7	4	+3	3	Transfer to Round 2 (League B)
3	Estonia	2	0	0	2	3	12	−9	0	Transfer to Round 2 (League B)

Source: UEFA
Rules for classification: Qualification tiebreakers
(H) Hosts
5 October 2022
14:30

Bosnia and Herzegovina	3–2	Moldova
Šabanović 4'; Radulović 33'; Avdić 51'	Report	Colnic 72', 87'

Stadium Etno Selo Stanišići, Bijeljina
Referee: Franziska Wildfeuer (Germany)

8 October 2022
14:30

Moldova	5–1	Estonia
Manoil 47', 88', 90+4'; Colnic 60', 66'	Report	Teern 45'

Stadium Etno Selo Stanišići, Bijeljina
Referee: Jurgita Mačikunytė (Lithuania)

11 October 2022
14:30

Estonia	2–7	Bosnia and Herzegovina
Kirpu 60'; Teern 75'	Report	Jelčić 16', 27', 29' (pen.); Joandi 24' (o.g.); Kreuz 55' (o.g.); Filipović 67'; Lepanović 81'

Stadium Etno Selo Stanišići, Bijeljina
Referee: Michalina Diakow (Poland)

==== Group B5 ====
Pos	Team	Pld	W	D	L	GF	GA	GD	Pts	Promotion
1	Bulgaria	2	2	0	0	8	0	+8	6	Promotion to Round 2 (League A)
2	Kosovo (H)	2	1	0	1	7	1	+6	3	Transfer to Round 2 (League B)
3	Gibraltar	2	0	0	2	0	14	−14	0	Transfer to Round 2 (League B)

Source: UEFA
Rules for classification: Qualification tiebreakers
(H) Hosts
8 November 2022
13:00

Kosovo	7–0	Gibraltar
Behrami 5', 18'; Guri 26', 42'; Kadriu 49' (pen.); Popaj 84'; Paqarizi 90+1'	Report

Fadil Vokrri Stadium, Pristina
Referee: Cansu Tiryaki (Turkey)

11 November 2022
13:00

Gibraltar	0–7	Bulgaria
	Report	D. Ivanova 13', 23'; Sergeeva 21', 26', 50'; Velkova 48'; N. Ivanova 65' (pen.)

Fadil Vokrri Stadium, Pristina
Referee: Michèle Schmölzer (Switzerland)

14 November 2022
13:00

Bulgaria	1–0	Kosovo
D. Ivanova 29'	Report

Fadil Vokrri Stadium, Pristina
Referee: Karoline Wacker (Germany)

==== Group B6 ====
Pos	Team	Pld	W	D	L	GF	GA	GD	Pts	Promotion
1	Belarus	2	1	1	0	5	1	+4	4	Promotion to Round 2 (League A)
2	North Macedonia	2	1	1	0	2	1	+1	4	Transfer to Round 2 (League B)
3	Georgia (H)	2	0	0	2	0	5	−5	0	Transfer to Round 2 (League B)

Source: UEFA
Rules for classification: Qualification tiebreakers
(H) Hosts
4 October 2022
16:00

Georgia	0–1	North Macedonia
	Report	Meijer 64'

GFF Rustavi Academy, Rustavi
Referee: Tanja Račić (Bosnia and Herzegovina)

7 October 2022
16:00

North Macedonia	1–1	Belarus
Sela 83'	Report	Kharashchak 19' (pen.)

GFF Rustavi Academy, Rustavi
Referee: Lovisa Johansson (Sweden)

10 October 2022
16:00

Belarus	4–0	Georgia
Pobegaylo 21'; Yakusik 45'; Bysik 65'; Kuntsevich 69'	Report

GFF Rustavi Academy, Rustavi
Referee: Galiya Echeva (Bulgaria)

==== Group B7 ====
Pos	Team	Pld	W	D	L	GF	GA	GD	Pts	Promotion
1	Czech Republic	2	2	0	0	19	0	+19	6	Promotion to Round 2 (League A)
2	Kazakhstan (H)	2	1	0	1	2	7	−5	3	Transfer to Round 2 (League B)
3	Andorra	2	0	0	2	0	14	−14	0	Transfer to Round 2 (League B)

Source: UEFA
Rules for classification: Qualification tiebreakers
(H) Hosts
5 October 2022
10:00

Kazakhstan	0–7	Czech Republic
	Report	Tenkrátová 27'; Střížová 30', 55'; Švíbková 34', 50'; Goretkiová 76'; Kochanová 80'

FC Kairat Academy, Almaty
Referee: Neslihan Muratdagi (Turkey)

8 October 2022
10:00

Czech Republic	12–0	Andorra
Švíbková 8', 10', 25'; Bárková 32'; Pavlíčková 48'; Černá 56'; Střížová 59', 82'; Ducháčková 63', 90+4'; Goretkiová 76'; Brejšková 90+3'	Report

FC Kairat Academy, Almaty
Referee: Marina Živković (Serbia)

11 October 2022
10:00

Andorra	0–2	Kazakhstan
	Report	Tyan 7', 88'

FC Kairat Academy, Almaty
Referee: Martina Molinaro (Italy)

== Round 2 ==
28 teams advanced to this round League A: 21 transferred from Round 1 and seven promoted from Round 2. The teams were divided in seven four-group teams. The seven group champions joined Belgium in the 2023 finals.

=== League A ===
Times are CET/CEST, (Note: CET (UTC+1) for dates up to 26 March 2023, and CEST (UTC+2) for dates thereafter.) as listed by UEFA (local times, if different, are in parentheses).

==== Group A1 ====
Pos	Team	Pld	W	D	L	GF	GA	GD	Pts	Promotion
1	Germany	3	3	0	0	17	0	+17	9	Qualified for the final tournament
2	Republic of Ireland	3	2	0	1	6	7	−1	6	
3	Norway (H)	3	1	0	2	3	5	−2	3	
4	Croatia	3	0	0	3	2	16	−14	0	Relegated to League B for the next tournament qualification

Source: UEFA
Rules for classification: Qualification tiebreakers
(H) Hosts
5 April 2023
12:00

Republic of Ireland	0–5	Germany
	Report	Şehitler 38'; Alber 66'; Bender 86', 88'; Steiner 90+5'

Jessheim Stadium, Jessheim
Referee: Ainara Acevedo (Spain)
5 April 2023
17:00

Norway	2–1	Croatia
Nilsen 45+1' (pen.); Sesay 79'	Report	Vračević 55'

Jessheim Stadium, Jessheim
Referee: Ewa Augustyn (Poland)

8 April 2023
12:00

Germany	10–0	Croatia
Bender 18', 45+3'; İ. Açıkgöz 25'; Alber 28' (pen.), 43' (pen.); Şehitler 35', 38'; Redzepi 50'; Steiner 53' (pen.); Nachtigall 85'	Report

Jessheim Stadium, Jessheim
Referee: Ainara Acevedo (Spain)
8 April 2023
17:00

Norway	1–2	Republic of Ireland
Jorde 82'	Report	Herron 19'; Mangan 72' (pen.)

Jessheim Stadium, Jessheim
Referee: Volha Blotskaya (Belarus)

11 April 2023
17:00

Germany	2–0	Norway
Alber 38'; Bender 90'	Report

Jessheim Stadium, Jessheim
Referee: Volha Blotskaya (Belarus)
11 April 2023
17:00

Croatia	1–4	Republic of Ireland
Iljkić 70'	Report	Mangan 43'; Herron 57'; Slattery 87'; Doherty 88'

Gjemselund, Kongsvinger
Referee: Ewa Augustyn (Poland)

==== Group A2 ====
Pos	Team	Pld	W	D	L	GF	GA	GD	Pts	Promotion
1	Czechia	3	2	0	1	4	7	−3	6	Qualified for the final tournament
2	Serbia	3	2	0	1	7	6	+1	6	
3	Poland (H)	3	1	1	1	9	5	+4	4	
4	Switzerland	3	0	1	2	1	3	−2	1	Relegated to League B for the next tournament qualification

Source: UEFA
Rules for classification: Qualification tiebreakers
(H) Hosts
5 April 2023
12:00

Switzerland	0–0	Poland
	Report

Stal Stalowa Wola Stadium, Stalowa Wola
Referee: Eszter Urbán (Hungary)
5 April 2023
18:00

Serbia	1–2	Czechia
Obradović 35'	Report	Popović 53' (o.g.); Polasková 87'

Stal Stalowa Wola Stadium, Stalowa Wola
Referee: Galiya Echeva (Bulgaria)

8 April 2023
12:00

Poland	6–1	Czechia
Sobal 11', 90+1', 90+2'; Jędrzejewska 35'; Sarapata 49'; Skupień 88'	Report	Tenkrátová 17'

Stal Stalowa Wola Stadium, Stalowa Wola
Referee: Eszter Urbán (Hungary)
8 April 2023
18:00

Serbia	2–1	Switzerland
Jestrović 19'; Matejić 76'	Report	Vallotto 6'

Stal Stalowa Wola Stadium, Stalowa Wola
Referee: Angelika Söder (Germany)

11 April 2023
12:00

Poland	3–4	Serbia
Jendrzejczyk 8'; Skupień 72'; Sarapata 87'	Report	Jestrović 17'; Matejić 54', 63'; Cygan 65' (o.g.)

Stal Stalowa Wola Stadium, Stalowa Wola
Referee: Angelika Söder (Germany)
11 April 2023
12:00

Czechia	1–0	Switzerland
Tenkrátová 31'	Report

Izolator Boguchwała Stadium, Boguchwała
Referee: Galiya Echeva (Bulgaria)

==== Group A3 ====
Pos	Team	Pld	W	D	L	GF	GA	GD	Pts	Promotion
1	France	3	3	0	0	10	1	+9	9	Qualified for the final tournament
2	Portugal (H)	3	2	0	1	10	2	+8	6	
3	Hungary	3	1	0	2	4	8	−4	3	
4	Romania	3	0	0	3	2	15	−13	0	Relegated to League B for the next tournament qualification

Source: UEFA
Rules for classification: Qualification tiebreakers
(H) Hosts
5 April 2023
15:00 (14:00 WEST)

France	6–0	Romania
Haugou 15'; Ribadeira 18', 49'; Fontaine 42', 83'; Chossenotte 78'	Report

Estádio Municipal de Lousada, Lousada
Referee: Lizzy Van Der Helm (Netherlands)
5 April 2023
18:00 (17:00 WEST)

Hungary	0–4	Portugal
	Report	Simas 37', 68'; Mairos 44'; Duarte 81'

Municipal 25 de Abril, Penafiel
Referee: Jelena Pejković (Croatia)

8 April 2023
15:00 (14:00 WEST)

France	2–0	Hungary
Ribadeira 19' (pen.), 71' (pen.)	Report

Complexo Desportivo Monte Azevido, Rebordosa
Referee: Maria Sole Caputi (Italy)
8 April 2023
18:00 (17:00 WEST)

Portugal	5–0	Romania
Cartaxo 26', 80'; Santos 28', 46', 76'	Report

Estádio Municipal de Lousada, Lousada
Referee: Jelena Pejković (Croatia)

11 April 2023
16:30 (15:30 WEST)

Portugal	1–2	France
Costa 38'	Report	Haugou 20'; Samoura 79'

Estádio Municipal de Amarante, Amarante
Referee: Maria Sole Caputi (Italy)
11 April 2023
16:30 (15:30 WEST)

Romania	2–4	Hungary
Pînzariu 11'; Toth 79'	Report	Siber 13' (pen.), 17', 55'; Sipőcz 47'

Complexo Desportivo Monte Azevido, Rebordosa
Referee: Lizzy Van Der Helm (Netherlands)

==== Group A4 ====
Pos	Team	Pld	W	D	L	GF	GA	GD	Pts	Promotion
1	Spain	3	3	0	0	15	0	+15	9	Qualified for the final tournament
2	England	3	1	1	1	6	4	+2	4	
3	Belarus	3	1	0	2	5	13	−8	3	
4	Slovenia	3	0	1	2	1	10	−9	1	Relegated to League B for the next tournament qualification

Source: UEFA
Rules for classification: Qualification tiebreakers
5 April 2023
11:00

Spain	8–0	Belarus
Martret 14'; Amezaga 21' (pen.), 38'; Moral 23', 50'; Camacho 59', 67'; Corrales 85'	Report

Centre Sportif de Colovray, Nyon
Referee: Victoria Beyer (France)
5 April 2023
14:15

Slovenia	1–1	England
Janež 78' (pen.)	Report	Watson 90+3'

Centre Sportif de Colovray, Nyon
Referee: Veronika Kovarova (Czech Republic)

8 April 2023
11:00

England	5–2	Belarus
Godfrey 11', 26'; Hennessy 14', 40'; Kendall 43'	Report	Tsikhamirava 27'; Markava 82'

Centre Sportif de Colovray, Nyon
Referee: Veronika Kovarova (Czech Republic)
8 April 2023
14:15

Spain	6–0	Slovenia
Ortega 4'; Moral 7'; Kosirnik 22' (o.g.); Martín Díaz 42'; Fernandez 63'; Medina 81'	Report

Centre Sportif de Colovray, Nyon
Referee: Eleni Antoniou (Greece)

11 April 2023
11:00

Belarus	3–0	Slovenia
Yesman 17', 50'; Pobegaylo 47' (pen.)	Report

Centre Sportif de Colovray, Nyon
Referee: Victoria Beyer (France)
11 April 2023
14:15

England	0–1	Spain
	Report	Amezaga 27'

Centre Sportif de Colovray, Nyon
Referee: Eleni Antoniou (Greece)

==== Group A5 ====
Pos	Team	Pld	W	D	L	GF	GA	GD	Pts	Promotion
1	Iceland	3	2	1	0	5	3	+2	7	Qualified for the final tournament
2	Denmark (H)	3	2	0	1	7	2	+5	6	
3	Sweden	3	1	0	2	6	4	+2	3	
4	Ukraine	3	0	1	2	3	12	−9	1	Relegated to League B for the next tournament qualification

Source: UEFA
Rules for classification: Qualification tiebreakers
(H) Hosts
5 April 2023
14:30

Ukraine	0–5	Sweden
	Report	Duras 25', 43'; Rehnberg 52'; Swedman 62'; Björk 67'

Køge Stadion, Køge
Referee: Alina Peşu (Romania)
5 April 2023
19:00

Denmark	0–1	Iceland
	Report	Sveinsdóttir 64'

Køge Stadion, Køge
Referee: Abigail Marriott (England)

8 April 2023
14:30

Denmark	5–1	Ukraine
Aagaard 9'; Sørensen 31' (pen.); Walter 42'; Sanvig 45+1'; Habibovic 72'	Report	Serbuk 85'

Køge Stadion, Køge
Referee: Jelena Cvetković (Serbia)
8 April 2023
19:00

Sweden	1–2	Iceland
Nildén 52'	Report	Jörundsdóttir 8'; Guðmundsdóttir 90+2'

Køge Stadion, Køge
Referee: Alina Peşu (Romania)

11 April 2023
14:30

Sweden	0–2	Denmark
	Report	Aagaard 5', 34'

Køge Stadion, Køge
Referee: Jelena Cvetković (Serbia)
11 April 2023
14:30

Iceland	2–2	Ukraine
Héðinsdóttir Gonzalez 31'; Jörundsdóttir 60'	Report	Molodiuk 45', 57'

Brøndby 2, Brøndby
Referee: Abigail Marriott (England)

==== Group A6 ====
Pos	Team	Pld	W	D	L	GF	GA	GD	Pts	Promotion
1	Austria	3	3	0	0	10	1	+9	9	Qualified for the final tournament
2	Italy (H)	3	2	0	1	8	2	+6	6	
3	Greece	3	1	0	2	4	10	−6	3	
4	Bosnia and Herzegovina	3	0	0	3	0	9	−9	0	Relegated to League B for the next tournament qualification

Source: UEFA
Rules for classification: Qualification tiebreakers
(H) Hosts
5 April 2023
15:00

Austria	2–0	Bosnia and Herzegovina
Ojukwu 18' (pen.); Aistleitner 47'	Report

Silvio Piola, Novara
Referee: Neslihan Muratdagi (Turkey)
5 April 2023
15:30

Greece	0–4	Italy
	Report	Pfattner 21'; Dellaperuta 35', 90+2'; Dragoni 68'

Stadio Silvio Piola, Vercelli
Referee: Aleksandra Česen (Slovenia)

8 April 2023
15:00

Austria	6–0	Greece
Mädl 22', 72', 90+1'; Aistleitner 35'; Ojukwu 41' (pen.); Natter 90+3'	Report

Stadio Silvio Piola, Vercelli
Referee: Hristiyana Guteva (Bulgaria)
8 April 2023
15:30

Italy	3–0	Bosnia and Herzegovina
Dragoni 32'; Renzotti 67'; Bertucci 71'	Report

Silvio Piola, Novara
Referee: Aleksandra Česen (Slovenia)

11 April 2023
14:30

Italy	1–2	Austria
Pfattner 87'	Report	Ojukwu 54'; Aistleitner 80'

Stadio Silvio Piola, Vercelli
Referee: Hristiyana Guteva (Bulgaria)
11 April 2023
14:30

Bosnia and Herzegovina	0–4	Greece
	Report	Ntarzanou 6', 24'; Giannaka 7'; Goulden 66'

Silvio Piola, Novara
Referee: Neslihan Muratdagi (Turkey)

==== Group A7 ====
Pos	Team	Pld	W	D	L	GF	GA	GD	Pts	Promotion
1	Netherlands (H)	3	3	0	0	9	1	+8	9	Qualified for the final tournament
2	Finland	3	2	0	1	6	4	+2	6	
3	Belgium	3	1	0	2	6	5	+1	3	
4	Bulgaria	3	0	0	3	2	13	−11	0	Relegated to League B for the next tournament qualification

Source: UEFA
Rules for classification: Qualification tiebreakers
(H) Hosts
5 April 2023
18:00

Netherlands	5–0	Bulgaria
Stoit 64', 67', 75'; Keukelaar 77'; Martina 90'	Report

Sportpark de Kranenhof, Escharen
Referee: Sabina Bolić (Croatia)
5 April 2023
18:00

Belgium	0–3	Finland
	Report	Lindström 23'; Sevenius 34', 45+1'

De Wieën, Venray
Referee: María Martínez (Spain)

8 April 2023
13:00

Finland	3–2	Bulgaria
Sarjanoja 19'; Lindström 81'; Antikainen 90+1'	Report	N. Ivanova 43'; Yordanova 45'

Sportpark de Kranenhof, Escharen
Referee: María Martínez (Spain)
8 April 2023
16:00

Netherlands	2–1	Belgium
Kardinaal 32'; Martina 90+3'	Report	Lecoq 35'

De Wieën, Venray
Referee: Frida Nielsen (Denmark)

11 April 2023
18:00

Finland	0–2	Netherlands
	Report	Henry 27'; van Oosten 76'

Sportpark de Kranenhof, Escharen
Referee: Frida Nielsen (Denmark)
11 April 2023
18:00

Bulgaria	0–5	Belgium
	Report	Boutiebi 13', 20', 64'; Zang Bikoula 18'; Lecoq 82'

Sportpark Parkzicht, Uden
Referee: Sabina Bolić (Croatia)

=== League B ===
Times are CET/CEST, as listed by UEFA (local times, if different, are in parentheses).

==== Group B1 ====
Pos	Team	Pld	W	D	L	GF	GA	GD	Pts	Promotion
1	Israel	3	3	0	0	12	1	+11	9	Promoted to League A for the next tournament qualification
2	North Macedonia (H)	3	2	0	1	8	2	+6	6	
3	Georgia	3	1	0	2	5	8	−3	3	
4	Gibraltar	3	0	0	3	0	14	−14	0	

Source: UEFA
Rules for classification: Qualification tiebreakers
(H) Hosts
4 April 2023
13:00

Israel	6–0	Gibraltar
Sribnenko 8', 21', 48'; Dercksen 68'; Gat 84'; Cohen 90+3'	Report

Gjorče Petrov Stadium, Skopje
Referee: Rasa Grigonė (Lithuania)
4 April 2023
13:00

Georgia	0–4	North Macedonia
	Report	Paneska 22'; L. Sulejmani 45+2'; Meijer 82'; Nastovska 90+5'

Petar Miloševski Training Centre, Skopje
Referee: Zuzana Valentová (Slovakia)

7 April 2023
13:00

Israel	4–0	Georgia
Biton 27'; Pavliashvili 35' (o.g.); Sribnenko 59'; Khalil 75' (pen.)	Report

Gjorče Petrov Stadium, Skopje
Referee: Elvira Nurmustafina (Kazakhstan)
7 April 2023
13:00

North Macedonia	3–0	Gibraltar
Paneska 11', 48'; Sela 22'	Report

Petar Miloševski Training Centre, Skopje
Referee: Zuzana Valentová (Slovakia)

10 April 2023
13:00

North Macedonia	1–2	Israel
L. Sulejmani 74'	Report	Biru 52', 83'

Petar Miloševski Training Centre, Skopje
Referee: Elvira Nurmustafina (Kazakhstan)
10 April 2023
13:00

Gibraltar	0–5	Georgia
	Report	Ambalia 17'; Sulashvili 26' (pen.), 54', 80'; Kankia 75' (pen.)

Gjorče Petrov Stadium, Skopje
Referee: Rasa Grigonė (Lithuania)

==== Group B2 ====
Pos	Team	Pld	W	D	L	GF	GA	GD	Pts	Promotion
1	Turkey	3	3	0	0	10	0	+10	9	Promoted to League A for the next tournament qualification
2	Lithuania (H)	3	1	1	1	8	4	+4	4	
3	Moldova	3	1	1	1	3	7	−4	4	
4	Andorra	3	0	0	3	1	11	−10	0	

Source: UEFA
Rules for classification: Qualification tiebreakers
(H) Hosts
1 April 2023
10:00 (11:00 EEST)

Turkey	4–0	Andorra
Rojin Polat 6'; Mine Yıldız 21', 60'; Tuana Yılmaz 90+4'	Report

LFF Stadium, Vilnius
Referee: Ifeoma Kulmala (Finland)
1 April 2023
15:00 (16:00 EEST)

Lithuania	2–2	Moldova
Proscevičiūtė 10'; Raznauskaitė 84'	Report	Gamarț 77'; Colnic 82'

LFF Stadium, Vilnius
Referee: Reelika Turi (Estonia)

4 April 2023
10:00 (11:00 EEST)

Moldova	1–0	Andorra
Da Cruz 32' (o.g.)	Report

LFF Stadium, Vilnius
Referee: Reelika Turi (Estonia)
4 April 2023
15:00 (16:00 EEST)

Turkey	1–0	Lithuania
Lina Titiz 45+1'	Report

LFF Stadium, Vilnius
Referee: Lucie Šulcová (Czech Republic)

7 April 2023
10:00 (11:00 EEST)

Moldova	0–5	Turkey
	Report	Ilayda Cansu Kara 31'; Berfin Elif Ceylan 36'; Tuana Yılmaz 54'; Rojin Polat 67'; Aleyna Ata 81'

LFF Stadium, Vilnius
Referee: Lucie Šulcová (Czech Republic)
7 April 2023
15:00 (16:00 EEST)

Andorra	1–6	Lithuania
Lluch Camin 7'	Report	Proscevičiūtė 45', 46', 90+3'; Kriaučiūnaitė 73'; Šukštulytė 79'; Raznauskaitė 87'

LFF Stadium, Vilnius
Referee: Ifeoma Kulmala (Finland)

==== Group B3 ====
Pos	Team	Pld	W	D	L	GF	GA	GD	Pts	Promotion
1	Northern Ireland (H)	3	2	0	1	9	3	+6	6	Promoted to League A for the next tournament qualification
2	Kosovo	3	2	0	1	6	3	+3	6	
3	Latvia	3	1	0	2	1	6	−5	3	
4	Cyprus	3	1	0	2	2	6	−4	3	

Source: UEFA
Rules for classification: Qualification tiebreakers
(H) Hosts
4 April 2023
14:00 (13:00 WEST)

Cyprus	0–4	Kosovo
	Report	Kallaba 23'; Haxhiu 36'; Guri 76'; Islami 88' (pen.)

Seaview, Belfast
Referee: Katalin Sipos (Hungary)
4 April 2023
20:00 (19:00 WEST)

Northern Ireland	5–0	Latvia
Neal 62'; Parker 67'; Reilly 73'; McLaughlin 77'; Halliday 79'	Report

Seaview, Belfast
Referee: Zulema Gonzalez Gonzalez (Spain)

7 April 2023
13:00 (12:00 WEST)

Northern Ireland	1–2	Cyprus
McLaughlin 81'	Report	Dionissiou 8'; Panagiotou 24'

Seaview, Belfast
Referee: Maria Marotta (Italy)
7 April 2023
13:00 (12:00 WEST)

Kosovo	1–0	Latvia
Islami 9'	Report

Solitude, Belfast
Referee: Katalin Sipos (Hungary)

10 April 2023
13:00 (12:00 WEST)

Kosovo	1–3	Northern Ireland
G. Berisha 28'	Report	Neal 57'; Halliday 83', 90+2'

Seaview, Belfast
Referee: Maria Marotta (Italy)
10 April 2023
13:00 (12:00 WEST)

Latvia	1–0	Cyprus
Vainere 44'	Report

Solitude, Belfast
Referee: Zulema Gonzalez Gonzalez (Spain)

==== Group B4 ====
Pos	Team	Pld	W	D	L	GF	GA	GD	Pts	Promotion
1	Faroe Islands	2	2	0	0	6	2	+4	6	Promoted to League A for the next tournament qualification
2	Malta	2	1	0	1	6	5	+1	3	
3	Armenia (H)	2	0	0	2	1	6	−5	0	

Source: UEFA
Rules for classification: Qualification tiebreakers
(H) Hosts
4 April 2023
12:00 (14:00 AMT)

Armenia	1–4	Malta
Khachatryan 90+2'	Report	Gatt 3' (pen.); Saliba 15', 85'; Farrugia 58'

Abovyan City Stadium, Abovyan
Referee: Andromachi Tsiofliki (Greece)

7 April 2023
12:00 (14:00 AMT)

Malta	2–4	Faroe Islands
Ionadi 59'; Saliba 76'	Report	Olsen 39'; Haraldsen 81', 84'; Brændstrup 88'

Abovyan City Stadium, Abovyan
Referee: Caroline Wacker (Germany)

10 April 2023
12:00 (14:00 AMT)

Faroe Islands	2–0	Armenia
Ernstsdóttir 26'; Olsen 45+1'	Report

Abovyan City Stadium, Abovyan
Referee: Martina Molinaro (Italy)

==== Group B5 ====
Pos	Team	Pld	W	D	L	GF	GA	GD	Pts	Promotion
1	Montenegro	2	2	0	0	6	2	+4	6	Promoted to League A for the next tournament qualification
2	Slovakia (H)	2	1	0	1	6	3	+3	3	
3	Azerbaijan	2	0	0	2	0	7	−7	0	

Source: UEFA
Rules for classification: Qualification tiebreakers
(H) Hosts
5 April 2023
16:00

Slovakia	2–3	Montenegro
Kovalíková 57'; Bayerová 71'	Report	Bicić 40', 54', 65'

Gabčíkovo Stadium, Gabčíkovo
Referee: Katarzyna Lisiecka-Sęk (Poland)

8 April 2023
11:00

Montenegro	3–0	Azerbaijan
Malesija 14'; Tošković 35' (pen.); Bicić 54'	Report

Gabčíkovo Stadium, Gabčíkovo
Referee: Ioanna Allayiotou (Cyprus)

11 April 2023
11:00

Azerbaijan	0–4	Slovakia
	Report	Ferencová 5', 37'; Mazúchová 12'; Škerdová 61'

Gabčíkovo Stadium, Gabčíkovo
Referee: Marina Živković (Serbia)

==== Group B6 ====
Pos	Team	Pld	W	D	L	GF	GA	GD	Pts	Promotion
1	Wales (H)	2	2	0	0	9	2	+7	6	Promoted to League A for the next tournament qualification
2	Estonia	2	1	0	1	2	4	−2	3	
3	Kazakhstan	2	0	0	2	2	7	−5	0	

Source: UEFA
Rules for classification: Qualification tiebreakers
(H) Hosts
4 April 2023
19:00 (18:00 BST)

Wales	5–2	Kazakhstan
Teisar 10', 37'; Pearce 63', 90'; Purchase 90+3'	Report	Norbayeva 70' (pen.); Yerzhanova 86'

Central Park, Denbigh
Referee: Catarina Campos (Portugal)

7 April 2023
13:00 (12:00 BST)

Kazakhstan	0–2	Estonia
	Report	Rannasto 9', 12'

Colliers Park, Wrexham
Referee: Jelena Međedović (Serbia)

10 April 2023
13:00 (12:00 BST)

Estonia	0–4	Wales
	Report	Teisar 15'; McGowan 52', 70'; Humphrey 65'

Central Park, Denbigh
Referee: Gamze Durmuş (Turkey)

==== Group B7 ====
Pos	Team	Pld	W	D	L	GF	GA	GD	Pts	Promotion
1	Scotland	2	2	0	0	12	0	+12	6	Promoted to League A for the next tournament qualification
2	Albania (H)	2	1	0	1	2	5	−3	3	
3	Liechtenstein	2	0	0	2	0	9	−9	0	

Source: UEFA
Rules for classification: Qualification tiebreakers
(H) Hosts
5 April 2023
14:30

Albania	0–5	Scotland
	Report	McLeary 16', 49'; McAneny 23', 57'; Adams 42'

Arena Kombëtare, Tirana
Referee: Justina Lavrenovaitė (Lithuania)

8 April 2023
11:30

Scotland	7–0	Liechtenstein
Nicoll 4', 19', 38', 78', 89'; Adams 81'; Jordan 86'	Report

Arena Kombëtare, Tirana
Referee: Olivia Tschon (Austria)

11 April 2023
14:30

Liechtenstein	0–2	Albania
	Report	Iliadhi 70'; Coka 88'

Arena Kombëtare, Tirana
Referee: Merima Čelik (Bosnia and Herzegovina)

== Qualified teams ==
The following eight teams qualified for the final tournament:

Team	Qualified as	Qualified on	Previous appearances in Under-19 Euro^{1} only U-19 era (since 2002)
Belgium	Hosts	19 April 2021	4 (2006, 2011, 2014, 2019)
Germany	Round 2 Group A1 winners	11 April 2023	17 (**2002**, 2003, 2004, 2005, **2006**, **2007**, 2008, 2009, 2010, **2011**, 2013, 2015, 2016, 2017, 2018, 2019, 2022)
Czechia	Round 2 Group A2 winners	11 April 2023	1 (2022)
France	Round 2 Group A3 winners	11 April 2023	16 (2002, **2003**, 2004, 2005, 2006, 2007, 2008, 2009, **2010**, **2013**, 2015, **2016**, 2017, 2018, **2019**, 2022)
Spain	Round 2 Group A4 winners	11 April 2023	15 (2002, 2003, **2004**, 2007, 2008, 2010, 2011, 2012, 2014, 2015, 2016, **2017**, **2018**, 2019, **2022**)
Iceland	Round 2 Group A5 winners	8 April 2023	2 (2007, 2009)
Austria	Round 2 Group A6 winners	11 April 2023	1 (2016)
Netherlands	Round 2 Group A7 winners	11 April 2023	9 (2003, 2006, 2010, 2011, **2014**, 2016, 2017, 2018, 2019)

^{1} Bold indicates champions for that year. Italic indicates hosts for that year.

== Goalscorers ==
In Round 1 there were 287 goals scored in 72 matches, for an average of 3.99 goals per match.

In Round 2 there were 285 goals scored in 72 matches, for an average of 3.96 goals per match.

In total there were 572 goals scored in 144 matches, for an average of 3.97 goals per match.

10 goals

- (Serbia) Nina Matejić

7 goals

- (France) Louna Ribadeira
- (Poland) Magdalena Sobal

6 goals

- (Spain) Lucia Moral
- (Faroe Islands) Lisa Haraldsen

5 goals

- (Czech Republic) Andrea Švíbková
- (Germany) Loreen Bender
- (Hungary) Glória Siber
- (Moldova) Iuliana Colnic
- (Scotland) Abigail Nicoll

4 goals

- (Austria) Valentina Mädl
- (Austria) Nicole Ojukwu
- (Belgium) Lore Jacobs
- (Czech Republic) Sabina Střížová
- (Denmark) Emilía Ásgeirsdóttir
- (Denmark) Jóhanna Sørensen
- (England) Freya Godfrey
- (Finland) Oona Sevenius
- (France) Pauline Haugou
- (Germany) Mara Alber
- (Iceland) Snædís María Jörundsdóttir
- (Israel) Eva Sribnenko
- (Lithuania) Meida Proscevičiūtė
- (Montenegro) Nejla Bicić
- (Netherlands) Lotte Keukelaar
- (Northern Ireland) Keri Halliday
- (Romania) Anita Horváth
- (Spain) Érika González
- (Wales) Tianna Teisar

3 goals

- (Austria) Isabel Aistleitner
- (Belgium) Rania Boutiebi
- (Bosnia and Herzegovina) Maja Jelčić
- (Bulgaria) Dimitra Ivanova
- (Bulgaria) Aleksandra Sergeeva
- (Czech Republic) Denisa Tenkrátová
- (Denmark) Alma Aagaard
- (England) Alex Hennessy
- (Faroe Islands) Malena Olsen
- (Georgia (country)) Eter Sulashvili
- (Germany) Alara Şehitler
- (Greece) Vasiliki Giannaka
- (Iceland) Írena Héðinsdóttir Gonzalez
- (Iceland) Elísa Lana Sigurjónsdóttir
- (Italy) Chiara Beccari
- (Italy) Elisa Pfattner
- (Kosovo) Albulena Guri
- (Latvia) Alīna Ansone
- (Malta) Sara Saliba
- (Moldova) Vanessa Manoil
- (North Macedonia) Biljana Paneska
- (Netherlands) Fleur Stoit
- (Norway) Ina Birkelund
- (Norway) Mawa Sesay
- (Poland) Natalia Rohn
- (Portugal) Maria Ferreira
- (Portugal) Daniela Santos
- (Portugal) Inês Simas
- (Serbia) Anja Jestrović
- (Ukraine) Yelyzaveta Molodiuk

2 goals

- (Austria) Amelie Roduner
- (Belgium) Maude Lecoq
- (Belarus) Anastasiya Pobegaylo
- (Belarus) Yana Yesman
- (Bulgaria) Nadezhda Ivanova
- (Croatia) Andrea Iljkić
- (Croatia) Petra Mikulica
- (Cyprus) Christina Kyriakidi
- (Czech Republic) Klára Ducháčková
- (Czech Republic) Albína Goretkiová
- (Denmark) Ajla Habibovic
- (Denmark) Clara La Cour
- (Estonia) Lisandra Rannasto
- (Estonia) Kristina Teern
- (Finland) Neela Antikainen
- (Finland) Lotta Lindström
- (France) Airine Fontaine
- (France) Océane Hurtré
- (Germany) Ilayda Acikgöz
- (Germany) Franziska Kett
- (Germany) Marie Steiner
- (Germany) Cora Zicai
- (Greece) Stamatia Ntarzanou
- (Republic of Ireland) Emma Doherty
- (Republic of Ireland) Scarlett Herron
- (Republic of Ireland) Eva Mangan
- (Iceland) Sædís Rún Heiðarsdóttir
- (Iceland) Vigdís Lilja Kristjánsdóttir
- (Israel) Orian Biru
- (Italy) Giulia Dragoni
- (Italy) Victoria Della Peruta
- (Kazakhstan) Anastassia Tyan
- (Kosovo) Flondra Behrami
- (Kosovo) Lorita Islami
- (Latvia) Madara Ērika Paidere
- (Latvia) Emija Emīlija Saule
- (Latvia) Evelīna Ušpaleviča
- (Latvia) Santa Sanija Vuškāne
- (Lithuania) Gintarė Raznauskaitė
- (Montenegro) Tanja Malesija
- (North Macedonia) Simona Rebekka Meijer
- (North Macedonia) Vesa Sela
- (North Macedonia) Lora Sulejmani
- (Northern Ireland) Naomi Mclaughlin
- (Northern Ireland) Aimee Neal
- (Netherlands) Louise van Oosten
- (Norway) Signe Gaupset
- (Norway) Guro Røn
- (Poland) Martyna Duchnowska
- (Poland) Patrycja Sarapata
- (Poland) Katja Skupień
- (Portugal) Sara Cartaxo
- (Portugal) Cristiana Martins
- (Romania) Adina Cristina Borodi
- (Romania) Teodora Andreea Pînzariu
- (Serbia) Natalija Obradović
- (Spain) Jone Amezaga
- (Spain) Estela Carbonell
- (Spain) Carla Camacho
- (Spain) Martina Fernández
- (Spain) Beatriz Vélez Ortiz
- (Scotland) Eilidh Adams
- (Scotland) Maria McAneny
- (Scotland) Jodi Mcleary
- (Slovakia) Michaela Ferencová
- (Sweden) Lucia Duras
- (Sweden) Matilda Nildén
- (Sweden) Victoria Svanström
- (Switzerland) Smilla Vallotto
- (Turkey) Rojin Polat
- (Turkey) Mine Yıldız
- (Turkey) Tuana Yılmaz
- (Wales) Bethan Mcgowan
- (Wales) Manon Pearce
- (Wales) Phoebie Poole

1 goal

- (Albania) Klaudia Borci
- (Albania) Jehona Coka
- (Albania) Bora Fucia
- (Albania) Aglia Iliadhi
- (Albania) Arlinda Kodra
- (Andorra) Lluch Camin
- (Armenia) Tatev Khachatryan
- (Austria) Anna Holl
- (Austria) Linda Natter
- (Austria) Naila Schöfberger
- (Azerbaijan) Edanur Mutlu
- (Belarus) Alina Kharashchak
- (Belarus) Anna Bysik
- (Belarus) Anastasia Kuntsevich
- (Belarus) Darya Markava
- (Belarus) Liya Tsikhamirava
- (Belarus) Evgeniya Yakusik
- (Belgium) Alixe Bosteels
- (Belgium) Marine Rosala
- (Belgium) Zarah Taillieu
- (Belgium) Ines van Gansbeke
- (Belgium) Véronique Zang Bikoula
- (Bosnia and Herzegovina) Edina Avdić
- (Bosnia and Herzegovina) Janica Filipović
- (Bosnia and Herzegovina) Milena Lepanović
- (Bosnia and Herzegovina) Lana Radulović
- (Bosnia and Herzegovina) Vanessa Šabanović
- (Bulgaria) Elizabet Velkova
- (Bulgaria) Preslava Yordanova
- (Croatia) Antonela Blažević
- (Croatia) Sara Ivandić
- (Croatia) Tea Šaban
- (Croatia) Tea Vračević
- (Croatia) Barbara Živković
- (Cyprus) Sophie Dionissiou
- (Cyprus) Maria Panagiotou
- (Cyprus) Anna Sofocleous
- (Cyprus) Domna Stylianou
- (Czech Republic) Anna Bárková
- (Czech Republic) Kateřina Brejšková
- (Czech Republic) Tereza Černá
- (Czech Republic) Andrea Kochanová
- (Czech Republic) Jaroslava Pavlíčková
- (Czech Republic) Vendula Polášková
- (Denmark) Ida Marie Jørgensen
- (Denmark) Mathilde Vistisen
- (Denmark) Anna Walter
- (England) Keira Barry
- (England) Freya Jupp
- (England) Lucia Kendall
- (England) Olivia McLoughlin
- (England) Jessica Simpson
- (England) Emma Thompson
- (England) Katy Watson
- (Estonia) Katrin Kirpu
- (Faroe Islands) Anna Carolina Brændstrup
- (Faroe Islands) Sólja Ernstsdóttir
- (Faroe Islands) Lea Johannesen
- (Faroe Islands) Rakul Sørensen
- (Finland) Helmi Perkaus
- (Finland) Inka Sarjanoja
- (Finland) Elli Seiro
- (Finland) Tuuli Viinikka
- (France) Shana Chossenotte
- (France) Melween Ndongala
- (France) Thiniba Samoura
- (France) Kysha Sylla
- (Georgia (country)) Tinatin Ambalia
- (Georgia (country)) Lizi Kankia
- (Germany) Jonna Brengel
- (Germany) Clara Fröhlich
- (Germany) Alisa Grincenco
- (Germany) Sophie Nachtigall
- (Germany) Dafina Redzepi
- (Greece) Mae Helena Goulden
- (Greece) Maria Saridaki
- (Hungary) Hanna Kiss-Lantos
- (Hungary) Adelina Molnár
- (Hungary) Virág Sipőcz
- (Hungary) Petra Tuza
- (Iceland) Henríetta Ágústsdóttir
- (Iceland) Amelía Rún Fjelsted
- (Iceland) Sigríður Theódóra Guðmundsdóttir
- (Iceland) Bergdís Sveinsdóttir
- (Iceland) Katla Tryggvadóttir
- (Israel) Noa Biton
- (Israel) Ravid Cohen
- (Israel) Asia Dercksen
- (Israel) Zohar Gat
- (Israel) Batoul Khalil
- (Israel) Talia Sommer
- (Italy) Sofia Bertucci
- (Italy) Matilde Pavan
- (Italy) Maria Petrara
- (Italy) Monica Renzotti
- (Italy) Eva Schatzer
- (Kazakhstan) Kazyna Norbayeva
- (Kazakhstan) Zhanelya Yerzhanova
- (Kosovo) Gresa Berisha
- (Kosovo) Floriana Haxhiu
- (Kosovo) Elma Kadriu
- (Kosovo) Riga Kallaba
- (Kosovo) Vesa Paqarizi
- (Kosovo) Erisa Popaj
- (Latvia) Vlada Kozlova
- (Latvia) Amēlija Lipšāne
- (Latvia) Monta Ščuka
- (Latvia) Anastasija Vainere
- (Lithuania) Ema Kriaučiūnaitė
- (Lithuania) Skaistė Petrauskaitė
- (Lithuania) Ineta Šukštulytė
- (Malta) Lexine Farrugia
- (Malta) Alexandra Marcella Gatt
- (Malta) Michela Rose Ionadi
- (Moldova) Mihaela Gamarț
- (Montenegro) Anastasija Rakočević
- (Montenegro) Lidija Stanić
- (Montenegro) Anđela Tošković
- (Netherlands) Ziva Henry
- (Netherlands) Hanna Huizenga
- (Netherlands) Isa Kardinaal
- (Netherlands) Shi-Jona Veranda Martina
- (Netherlands) Danique Noordman
- (Netherlands) Kealyn Thomas
- (Netherlands) Danique Tolhoek
- (Netherlands) Rosa van Gool
- (North Macedonia) Mihaela Nastovska
- (Northern Ireland) Helen Parker
- (Northern Ireland) Eve Reilly
- (Norway) Julie Jorde
- (Norway) Thea Kyvåg
- (Norway) Cille Nilsen
- (Norway) Cathinka Tandberg
- (Norway) Helene Dønnum Veum
- (Poland) Julia Jędrzejewska
- (Poland) Nicole Jendrzejczyk
- (Poland) Oliwia Katowicz
- (Portugal) Lara Costa
- (Portugal) Serena Duarte
- (Portugal) Catarina Mairos
- (Portugal) Beatriz Nogueira
- (Republic of Ireland) Jenna Slattery
- (Republic of Ireland) Jessie Stapleton
- (Romania) Cristina Botojel
- (Romania) Antonia Bratu
- (Romania) Anda-Gabriela Jivan
- (Romania) Ioana-Simona Sigheartău
- (Romania) Gyorgyi Toth
- (Scotland) Hannah Jordan
- (Serbia) Sara Stokić
- (Slovakia) Karolína Bayerová
- (Slovakia) Júlia Iľková
- (Slovakia) Frederika Kovalíková
- (Slovakia) Lenka Mazúchová
- (Slovakia) Sofia Anna Škerdová
- (Slovakia) Aneta Surová
- (Slovenia) Anja Eferl
- (Slovenia) Korina Lara Janež
- (Slovenia) Nina Kajzba
- (Spain) Ona Baradad
- (Spain) Lucía Corrales
- (Spain) Júlia Bartel
- (Spain) Fiamma
- (Spain) Esther Laborde
- (Spain) Laia Martret
- (Spain) Andrea Medina
- (Spain) Sara Martín Díaz
- (Spain) Sara Ortega
- (Sweden) Lisa Björk
- (Sweden) Svea Rehnberg
- (Sweden) Saga Swedman
- (Switzerland) Caterina Tramezzani
- (Switzerland) Svenja von Felten
- (Turkey) Aleyna Ata
- (Turkey) Berfin Ceylan
- (Turkey) Ilayda Cansu Kara
- (Turkey) Lina Titiz
- (Ukraine) Viktoriia Radionova
- (Ukraine) Liliana Serbuk
- (Wales) Ella Humphrey
- (Wales) Lauren Purchase

1 own goal

- (Andorra) Maria Da Cruz (against Moldova)
- (Armenia) Yana Harutyunyan (against Albania)
- (Estonia) Anett Joandi (against Bosnia and Herzegovina)
- (Estonia) Elise Kreuz (against Bosnia and Herzegovina)
- (Georgia (country)) Ana Pavliashvili (against Israel)
- (Lithuania) Donata Švarcaitė (against Iceland)
- (Malta) Alexandra Marcella Gatt (against Norway)
- (Northern Ireland) Kysha Sylla (against France)
- (Poland) Martyna Cygan (against Serbia)
- (Slovakia) Karolína Bayerová (against England)
- (Slovenia) Margit Kosirnik (against Spain)
- (Serbia) Milica Gaković (against Hungary)
- (Serbia) Anđela Popović (against Czechia)
- (Switzerland) Giulia Schlup (against Finland)

Source: UEFA.com
