= 2024–25 UEFA Women's Champions League qualifying rounds =

Tournament details
- Dates: 4 September – 26 September 2024
- Teams: 68

The 2024–25 UEFA Women's Champions League qualifying rounds began on 4 September and ended on 26 September 2024.

A total of 68 teams competed in the group stage qualifying rounds of the 2024–25 UEFA Women's Champions League, which included two rounds, with 46 teams in the Champions Path and 22 teams in the League Path. The 14 winners in the round 2 (nine from Champions Path, five from League Path) advanced to the group stage, to join the four teams that entered in that round.

Times are CEST (UTC+2), as listed by UEFA (local times, if different, are in parentheses).

== Teams ==
=== Champions Path ===
The Champions Path included all league champions which did not qualified directly for the group stage, and consists of the following rounds:

- Round 1 (43 teams playing one-legged semi-finals, final and third place match): 43 teams entered in this round.
- Round 2 (14 teams): three teams entered in this round and eleven winners of the round 1 finals.

Below are the participating teams of the Champions Path (with their 2024 UEFA club coefficients), grouped by the starting rounds.

Key to colours
Winners of round 2 advance to group stage

Round 2
Team	Coeff.
(Czech Republic) Slavia Prague	33.466
(Italy) Roma	28.800
(Sweden) Hammarby	4.999

Round 1
Team	Coeff.
(Portugal) Benfica	36.800
(Austria) St. Pölten	32.250
(Kazakhstan) BIIK Shymkent	21.450
(Netherlands) Twente	18.400
(Albania) Vllaznia	16.800
(Norway) Vålerenga	15.300
(Ukraine) Vorskla Poltava	14.800
(Cyprus) Apollon Ladies	14.400
(Belgium) Anderlecht	14.400
(Iceland) Valur	13.050
(Bosnia and Herzegovina) SFK 2000	12.000
(Hungary) Ferencváros	11.400
(Switzerland) Servette	11.350
(Slovenia) Mura	10.800
(Lithuania) Gintra	10.200
(Belarus) Dinamo Minsk	9.100
(Greece) PAOK	8.400
(Montenegro) Breznica	8.400
(Luxembourg) Racing Union	7.200
(Kosovo) Mitrovica	7.100
(Finland) KuPS	7.000
(Croatia) Osijek	6.700
(Malta) Birkirkara	6.600
(Latvia) SFK Rīga	6.600
(Estonia) Flora Tallinn	6.600
(Israel) Kiryat Gat	6.400
(Scotland) Celtic	6.400
(Moldova) Agarista Anenii Noi	5.400
(Georgia (country)) Lanchkhuti	5.400
(Bulgaria) Sofia	5.300
(Faroe Islands) KÍ	4.800
(Denmark) Nordsjælland	4.350
(Slovakia) Spartak Myjava	4.300
(Republic of Ireland) Peamount	4.100
(Northern Ireland) Glentoran	3.600
(North Macedonia) Ljuboten	2.800
(Serbia) Crvena Zvezda	2.800
(Wales) Cardiff City	2.200
(Poland) Pogoń Szczecin	1.800
(Romania) Farul Constanța	1.500
(Turkey) Galatasaray	1.500
(Armenia) Pyunik	0.600
(Azerbaijan) Neftçi	0.000

=== League Path ===
The League Path includes all league non-champions and consisted of the following rounds:

- Round 1 (16 teams playing one-legged semi-finals, final and third place match): 16 teams entered in this round.
- Round 2 (10 teams): six teams entered in this round and four winners of the round 1 finals.

Below are the participating teams of the League Path (with their 2022 UEFA club coefficients), grouped by the starting rounds.

Key to colours
Winners of round 2 advance to group stage

Round 2
Team	Coeff.
(France) Paris Saint-Germain	98.966
(Germany) VfL Wolfsburg	92.799
(Spain) Real Madrid	41.633
(England) Manchester City	40.999
(Italy) Juventus	40.800
(Sweden) BK Häcken	34.999

Round 1
Team	Coeff.
(England) Arsenal	57.999
(Spain) Atlético Madrid	34.633
(France) Paris FC	26.666
(Czech Republic) Sparta Prague	26.466
(Germany) Eintracht Frankfurt	24.799
(Netherlands) Ajax	23.400
(Denmark) Brøndby	22.350
(Belarus) FC Minsk	21.100
(Iceland) Breiðablik	18.050
(Italy) Fiorentina	16.800
(Norway) Rosenborg	9.300
(Portugal) Sporting CP	6.800
(Sweden) Linköping	6.499
(Scotland) Rangers	6.400
(Austria) First Vienna	4.250
(Ukraine) Kolos Kovalivka	3.800

== Format ==
Round 1 consisted of mini-tournaments with two semi-finals, a final and a third-place play-off hosted by one of the participating teams. If the score was level at the end of normal time, extra time was played, and if the same number of goals was scored by both teams during extra time, the tie was decided by a penalty shoot-out. Round 2 was played over two legs, with each team playing one leg at home. The team that scored more goals on aggregate over the two legs advanced to the next round. If the aggregate score was level at the end of normal time of the second leg, extra time was played, and if the same number of goals was scored by both teams at the end of normal time, the tie was decided by a penalty shoot-out. An additional preliminary round consisting of two-legged home-and-away matches would have been played by the champions from the lowest-ranked associations if more than 50 associations had entered the tournament and the title holders had not qualified through league position. Since only 50 associations entered, this round was skipped.

In the draws for each round, teams were seeded based on their UEFA club coefficients at the beginning of the season, with the teams divided into seeded and unseeded pots containing the same number of teams. Prior to the draws, UEFA may form "groups" in accordance with the principles set by the Club Competitions Committee, but they were purely for convenience of the draw and did not resemble any real groupings in the sense of the competition. Teams from associations with political conflicts as decided by UEFA were not drawn into the same tie. After the draws, the order of legs of a tie could have been reversed by UEFA due to scheduling or venue conflicts.

== Schedule ==
The schedule of the competition was as follows (all draws were held at the UEFA headquarters in Nyon, Switzerland).

Schedule for 2024–25 UEFA Women's Champions League qualifying rounds
Round	Draw date	First leg	Second leg
Round 1	5 July 2024	4 September 2024 (semi-finals)	7 September 2024 (third-place play-off & final)
Round 2	9 September 2024	18–19 September 2024	25–26 September 2024

== Round 1 ==
=== Seeding ===
The draw for Round 1 was held on 5 July 2024.

Seeding of teams for the semi-final round was based on their 2024 UEFA club coefficients, with 22 seeded teams and 21 unseeded teams in the Champions Path, and eight seeded teams and eight unseeded teams in the League Path. Teams were drawn into two semi-finals within each four team group and, for the groups with three teams, the team with the highest coefficient was given a bye to the final. In the semi-finals, seeded teams were considered the "home" team, while in the third-place play-offs and finals, the teams with the highest coefficients were considered the "home" team for administrative purposes. Due to political reasons, teams from the following associations could not be drawn into the same group: Kosovo / Bosnia and Herzegovina; Kosovo / Serbia; Kosovo / Russia; Ukraine / Belarus.

Champions Path
Seeded	Unseeded
(Portugal) Benfica; (Austria) St. Pölten; (Kazakhstan) BIIK Shymkent; (Netherlands) Twente; (Albania) Vllaznia; (Norway) Vålerenga; (Ukraine) Vorskla Poltava; (Cyprus) Apollon Ladies; (Belgium) Anderlecht; (Iceland) Valur; (Bosnia and Herzegovina) SFK 2000; (Hungary) Ferencváros; (Switzerland) Servette; (Slovenia) Mura; (Lithuania) Gintra; (Belarus) Dinamo Minsk; (Greece) PAOK; (Montenegro) Breznica; (Luxembourg) Racing Union; (Kosovo) Mitrovica; (Finland) KuPS; (Croatia) Osijek	(Malta) Birkirkara; (Latvia) SFK Rīga; (Estonia) Flora; (Israel) Kiryat Gat; (Scotland) Celtic; (Moldova) Agarista Anenii Noi; (Georgia (country)) Lanchkhuti; (Bulgaria) Sofia; (Faroe Islands) KÍ; (Denmark) Nordsjælland; (Slovakia) Spartak Myjava; (Republic of Ireland) Peamount; (Northern Ireland) Glentoran; (North Macedonia) Ljuboten; (Serbia) Crvena Zvezda; (Wales) Cardiff City; (Poland) Pogoń Szczecin; (Romania) Farul Constanța; (Turkey) Galatasaray; (Armenia) Pyunik; (Azerbaijan) Neftçi

League Path
Seeded	Unseeded
(England) Arsenal; (Spain) Atlético Madrid; (France) Paris FC; (Czech Republic) Sparta Prague; (Germany) Eintracht Frankfurt; (Netherlands) Ajax; (Denmark) Brøndby; (Belarus) FC Minsk	(Iceland) Breiðablik; (Italy) Fiorentina; (Norway) Rosenborg; (Portugal) Sporting CP; (Sweden) Linköping; (Scotland) Rangers; (Austria) First Vienna; (Ukraine) Kolos Kovalivka

=== Champions Path ===
==== Tournament 1 ====
===== Bracket =====
Hosted by SFK 2000.

Semi-finals
4 September
(Bosnia and Herzegovina) SFK 2000	3
(Faroe Islands) KÍ	0
4 September
(Portugal) Benfica	3
(Denmark) Nordsjælland	1

Final
7 September
(Bosnia and Herzegovina) SFK 2000	0
(Portugal) Benfica	4
Third place
7 September
(Faroe Islands) KÍ	0
(Denmark) Nordsjælland	2

===== Semi-finals =====
4 September 2024
11:00

SFK 2000 (Bosnia and Herzegovina)	3–0	(Faroe Islands) KÍ
Krajnić 29'; Kršo 71'; Medić 80'	Report

Koševo City Stadium, Sarajevo
Attendance: 320
Referee: Oxana Cruc (Moldova)

4 September 2024
17:00

Benfica (Portugal)	3–1	(Denmark) Nordsjælland
Martín-Prieto 23', 45+2'; Raysla 39'	Report	Walter 56'

Koševo City Stadium, Sarajevo
Attendance: 100
Referee: Andromáchi Tsioflíki (Greece)

===== Third-place play-off =====
7 September 2024
11:00

KÍ (Faroe Islands)	0–2	(Denmark) Nordsjælland
	Report	Scheuer 6'; Andersen 88'

Koševo City Stadium, Sarajevo
Attendance: 50
Referee: Olivia Tschon (Austria)

===== Final =====
7 September 2024
17:00

Benfica (Portugal)	4–0	(Bosnia and Herzegovina) SFK 2000
Amado 6'; Martín-Prieto 11'; Davidson 25'; Alidou 68'	Report

Koševo City Stadium, Sarajevo
Attendance: 520
Referee: Emanuela Rusta (Albania)

==== Tournament 2 ====
===== Bracket =====
Hosted by Lanchkhuti.

Semi-finals
4 September
(Albania) Vllaznia	3
(Georgia (country)) Lanchkhuti	0
4 September
(Austria) St. Pölten	5
(Azerbaijan) Neftçi	0

Final
7 September
(Albania) Vllaznia	0
(Austria) St. Pölten	1
Third place
7 September
(Georgia (country)) Lanchkhuti	2
(Azerbaijan) Neftçi	1

===== Semi-finals =====
4 September 2024
16:00 (18:00 UTC+4)

Vllaznia (Albania)	3–0	(Georgia (country)) Lanchkhuti
Doci 42'; Borci 45+4'; Ndoj 82'	Report

Ramaz Shengelia Stadium, Kutaisi
Attendance: 240
Referee: Teresa Alice Pimenta de Oliveira (Portugal)

4 September 2024
16:00 (18:00 UTC+4)

St. Pölten (Austria)	5–0	(Azerbaijan) Neftçi
Hillebrand 12', 17'; Klein 16' (pen.); Zver 47'; Dubcová 51'	Report

Tskaltubo Technical Center, Tskaltubo
Attendance: 75
Referee: Jelena Kumer (Croatia)

===== Third-place play-off =====
7 September 2024
15:00 (17:00 UTC+4)

Lanchkhuti (Georgia (country))	2–1	(Azerbaijan) Neftçi
Ramírez 13'; Sulashvili 55'	Report	Dülek 53'

Tskaltubo Technical Center, Tskaltubo
Attendance: 65
Referee: Caroline Lanssens (Belgium)

===== Final =====
7 September 2024
18:00 (20:00 UTC+4)

St. Pölten (Austria)	1–0	(Albania) Vllaznia
Dubcová 17'	Report

Ramaz Shengelia Stadium, Kutaisi
Attendance: 40
Referee: Maria Marotta (Italy)

==== Tournament 3 ====
===== Bracket =====
Hosted by Gintra.

Semi-finals
4 September
(Finland) KuPS	1
(Scotland) Celtic (a.e.t.)	3
4 September
(Lithuania) Gintra	5
(Moldova) Agarista Anenii Noi	0

Final
7 September
(Scotland) Celtic	2
(Lithuania) Gintra	0
Third place
7 September
(Finland) KuPS	6
(Moldova) Agarista Anenii Noi	0

===== Semi-finals =====
4 September 2024
11:00 (12:00 UTC+3)

KuPS (Finland)	1–3 (a.e.t.)	(Scotland) Celtic
Ariyo 18'	Report	Noonan 63', 91', 97'

Savivaldybė Stadium, Šiauliai
Attendance: 135
Referee: Jana Van Laere (Belgium)

4 September 2024
17:00 (18:00 UTC+3)

Gintra (Lithuania)	5–0	(Moldova) Agarista Anenii Noi
T. Shamase 39'; S. Shamase 49', 75', 81'; Jaatinen 71'	Report

Savivaldybė Stadium, Šiauliai
Attendance: 650
Referee: Cansu Tiryaki (Turkey)

===== Third-place play-off =====
7 September 2024
11:00 (12:00 UTC+3)

KuPS (Finland)	6–0	(Moldova) Agarista Anenii Noi
Ariyo 1', 9'; Nurmi 49'; Kaikkonen 75'; Santamäki 84' (pen.); Rochi 88'	Report

Savivaldybė Stadium, Šiauliai
Attendance: 60
Referee: Aleksandra Česen (Slovenia)

===== Final =====
7 September 2024
17:00 (18:00 UTC+3)

Gintra (Lithuania)	0–2	(Scotland) Celtic
	Report	McGregor 21'; Loferski 81'

Savivaldybė Stadium, Šiauliai
Attendance: 950
Referee: Merima Čelik (Bosnia and Herzegovina)

==== Tournament 4 ====
===== Bracket =====
Hosted by Birkirkara.

Semi-finals
4 September
(Montenegro) Breznica	1
(Malta) Birkirkara (a.e.t.)	2
4 September
(Belgium) Anderlecht	4
(Serbia) Crvena Zvezda	1

Final
7 September
(Malta) Birkirkara	0
(Belgium) Anderlecht	5
Third place
7 September
(Montenegro) Breznica	0
(Serbia) Crvena Zvezda	3

===== Semi-finals =====
4 September 2024
17:45

Anderlecht (Belgium)	4–1	(Serbia) Crvena Zvezda
Vătafu 6'; Deloose 19'; Delabre 58'; Vanzeir 74'	Report	Matejić 90+5'

Centenary Stadium, Ta' Qali
Attendance: 62
Referee: Sofik Torosyan (Armenia)

4 September 2024
21:15

Breznica (Montenegro)	1–2 (a.e.t.)	(Malta) Birkirkara
Jankov 17'	Report	Hazekawa 60', 109' (pen.)

Centenary Stadium, Ta' Qali
Attendance: 288
Referee: Louise Thompson (Northern Ireland)

===== Third-place play-off =====
7 September 2024
17:45

Crvena Zvezda (Serbia)	3–0	(Montenegro) Breznica
Matejić 38', 75', 82'	Report

Centenary Stadium, Ta' Qali
Attendance: 20
Referee: Martina Molinaro (Italy)

===== Final =====
7 September 2024
21:15

Anderlecht (Belgium)	5–0	(Malta) Birkirkara
Delabre 16'; Minnaert 51'; Vanzeir 53'; Bennink 90+3'; Teinturier 90+5'	Report

Centenary Stadium, Ta' Qali
Attendance: 265
Referee: Tatyana Sorokopudova (Kazakhstan)

==== Tournament 5 ====
===== Bracket =====
Hosted by Twente.

Semi-finals
4 September
(Netherlands) Twente	7
(Wales) Cardiff City	0
4 September
(Iceland) Valur	10
(North Macedonia) Ljuboten	0

Final
7 September
(Netherlands) Twente	5
(Iceland) Valur	0
Third place
7 September
(Wales) Cardiff City	0
(North Macedonia) Ljuboten	2

===== Semi-finals =====
4 September 2024
13:00

Valur (Iceland)	10–0	(North Macedonia) Ljuboten
Ingadóttir 2', 63'; Jónsdóttir 5'; Anasi 13'; Ágúrdóttir 18'; Pétúrsdóttir 35'; Tryggvadóttir 51', 52', 81'; Þorvaldsdóttir 71'	Report

Sportpark Schreurserve, Enschede
Attendance: 80
Referee: Lovisa Johansson (Sweden)

4 September 2024
19:00

Twente (Netherlands)	7–0	(Wales) Cardiff City
Van Dooren 5', 17'; Te Brake 59'; Knol 72'; Andradóttir 75'; Verdaasdonk 77'; Ravensbergen 90+2' (pen.)	Report

Sportpark Schreurserve, Enschede
Attendance: 505
Referee: Anastasiya Romanyuk (Ukraine)

===== Third-place play-off =====
7 September 2024
12:00

Ljuboten (North Macedonia)	2–0	(Wales) Cardiff City
Mustafa 38', 90+2'	Report

Sportpark Schreurserve, Enschede
Attendance: 75
Referee: Ioanna Allayiotou (Cyprus)

===== Final =====
7 September 2024
18:00

Twente (Netherlands)	5–0	(Iceland) Valur
Hulst 22', 40'; Van Dijk 42', 90'; Van Dooren 69'	Report

Sportpark Schreurserve, Enschede
Attendance: 634
Referee: Sabina Bolić (Croatia)

==== Tournament 6 ====
===== Bracket =====
Hosted by Apollon Ladies.

Semi-finals
4 September
(Cyprus) Apollon Ladies	3
(Armenia) FC Pyunik	0
4 September
(Slovenia) ŽNK Mura	3
(Northern Ireland) Glentoran	2

Final
7 September
(Cyprus) Apollon Ladies	2
(Slovenia) ŽNK Mura	3
Third place
7 September
(Armenia) FC Pyunik	0
(Northern Ireland) Glentoran	1

===== Semi-finals =====
4 September 2024
16:00 (17:00 UTC+3)

ŽNK Mura (Slovenia)	3–2	(Northern Ireland) Glentoran
Makovec 15'; Malakhova 29'; Vilčnik 56' (pen.)	Report	McCarron 59'; Vance 71' (pen.)

Stelios Kyriakides Stadium, Paphos
Attendance: 50
Referee: Frederikke Lydia Søkjær (Denmark)

4 September 2024
20:30 (21:30 UTC+3)

Apollon Ladies (Cyprus)	3–0	(Armenia) FC Pyunik
Hudson 45+6'; Surpris 51'; Oppong 90+5'	Report

Stelios Kyriakides Stadium, Paphos
Attendance: 250
Referee: Jurgita Mačikunytė (Lithuania)

===== Third-place play-off =====
7 September 2024
16:00 (17:00 UTC+3)

Glentoran (Northern Ireland)	1–0	(Armenia) FC Pyunik
Wilson 37'	Report

Stelios Kyriakides Stadium, Paphos
Attendance: 30
Referee: Ana Maria Terteleac (Romania)

===== Final =====
7 September 2024
20:30 (21:30 UTC+3)

Apollon Ladies (Cyprus)	2–3	(Slovenia) ŽNK Mura
Guns 38'; Freda 79'	Report	Makovec 15', 84'; Šoštarič 30'

Stelios Kyriakides Stadium, Paphos
Attendance: 200
Referee: Fabienne Michel (Germany)

==== Tournament 7 ====
===== Bracket =====
Hosted by Pogoń Szczecin.

Semi-finals
4 September
(Greece) PAOK (a.e.t.)	2
(Israel) Kiryat Gat	1
4 September
(Switzerland) Servette	1
(Poland) Pogoń Szczecin	0

Final
7 September
(Greece) PAOK	0
(Switzerland) Servette	2
Third place
7 September
(Israel) Kiryat Gat	0
(Poland) Pogoń Szczecin	1

===== Semi-finals =====
4 September 2024
12:00

PAOK (Greece)	2–1 (a.e.t.)	(Israel) Kiryat Gat
Koskeridou 47'; Helmvall 111'	Report	Pastilha 80' (pen.)

Florian Krygier Stadium, Szczecin
Attendance: 36
Referee: Silvia Andreia Rosa Domingos (Portugal)

4 September 2024
20:00

Servette (Switzerland)	1–0	(Poland) Pogoń Szczecin
Jonušaitė 90+2'	Report

Florian Krygier Stadium, Szczecin
Attendance: 2,575
Referee: Jeļena Jermolajeva (Latvia)

===== Third-place play-off =====
7 September 2024
12:00

Kiryat Gat (Israel)	0–1	(Poland) Pogoń Szczecin
	Report	Crim 12'

Florian Krygier Stadium, Szczecin
Attendance: 588
Referee: Lotta Vuorio (Finland)

===== Final =====
7 September 2024
20:00

Servette (Switzerland)	2–0	(Greece) PAOK
Jonušaitė 67' (pen.); Revelli 90+1'	Report

Florian Krygier Stadium, Szczecin
Attendance: 54
Referee: Kristina Georgieva (Bulgaria)

==== Tournament 8 ====
===== Bracket =====
Hosted by Racing Union.

Semi-finals
4 September
(Kazakhstan) BIIK Shymkent	3
(Bulgaria) NSA Sofia	0
4 September
(Luxembourg) Racing Union	1
(Turkey) Galatasaray	4

Final
7 September
(Kazakhstan) BIIK Shymkent	0
(Turkey) Galatasaray	5
Third place
7 September
(Bulgaria) NSA Sofia	0
(Luxembourg) Racing Union	2

===== Semi-finals =====
4 September 2024
13:00

BIIK Shymkent (Kazakhstan)	3–0	(Bulgaria) NSA Sofia
Gabelia 45+1', 55'; Serrant 66'	Report

Stade Achille Hammerel, Luxembourg City
Attendance: 80
Referee: Stacey Pearson (England)

4 September 2024
19:00

Racing Union (Luxembourg)	1–4	(Turkey) Galatasaray
Quatrana 61'	Report	Topçu 16' (pen.); Stašková 32'; Karabulut 45+5'; Usme 90+1'

Stade Achille Hammerel, Luxembourg City
Attendance: 750
Referee: Anastasía Mylopoúlou (Greece)

===== Third-place play-off =====
7 September 2024
13:00

Racing Union (Luxembourg)	2–0	(Bulgaria) NSA Sofia
Quatrana 55', 67'	Report

Stade Achille Hammerel, Luxembourg City
Attendance: 150
Referee: Katarzyna Lisiecka-Sęk (Poland)

===== Final =====
7 September 2024
19:00

BIIK Shymkent (Kazakhstan)	0–5	(Turkey) Galatasaray
	Report	Diallo 8', 66', 90+4'; Stašková 20'; Usme 70'

Stade Achille Hammerel, Luxembourg City
Attendance: 250
Referee: Marina Živković (Serbia)

==== Tournament 9 ====
===== Bracket =====
Hosted by Osijek.

Semi-finals
4 September
(Croatia) Osijek	2
(Slovakia) Spartak Myjava	0
4 September
(Belarus) Dinamo Minsk	1
(Republic of Ireland) Peamount (a.e.t.)	2

Final
7 September
(Croatia) Osijek	2
(Republic of Ireland) Peamount	1
Third place
7 September
(Slovakia) Spartak Myjava	2
(Belarus) Dinamo Minsk	3

===== Semi-finals =====
4 September 2024
11:00

Dinamo Minsk (Belarus)	1–2 (a.e.t.)	(Republic of Ireland) Peamount
Sas 33'	Report	Dolan 7'; Letmon 96'

Gradski Vrt Stadium, Osijek
Attendance: 64
Referee: Tjaša Misja (Slovenia)

4 September 2024
17:00

Osijek (Croatia)	2–0	(Slovakia) Spartak Myjava
Lojna 49', 53'	Report

Gradski Vrt Stadium, Osijek
Attendance: 300
Referee: Zoí Stávrou (Cyprus)

===== Third-place play-off =====
7 September 2024
11:00

Dinamo Minsk (Belarus)	3–2	(Slovakia) Spartak Myjava
Kavaliova 73'; Siniauskaya 79'; Pilipenko 90+4'	Report	Kramlíková 36'; Bogorová 45+2'

Gradski Vrt Stadium, Osijek
Attendance: 40
Referee: Nanna Løf Andersen (Denmark)

===== Final =====
7 September 2024
17:00

Osijek (Croatia)	2–1	(Republic of Ireland) Peamount
Lojna 47'; Petković 51'	Report	Beirne 4'

Gradski Vrt Stadium, Osijek
Attendance: 430
Referee: Elvira Nurmustafina (Kazakhstan)

==== Tournament 10 ====
===== Bracket =====
Hosted by Ferencváros.

Semi-finals
4 September
(Hungary) Ferencváros	2
(Estonia) Flora	1
4 September
(Ukraine) Vorskla Poltava	5
(Latvia) SFK Rīga	0

Final
7 September
(Hungary) Ferencváros	0
(Ukraine) Vorskla Poltava	2
Third place
7 September
(Estonia) Flora (a.e.t.) (p)	0 (7)
(Latvia) SFK Rīga	0 (6)

===== Semi-finals =====
4 September 2024
12:00

Vorskla Poltava (Ukraine)	5–0	(Latvia) SFK Rīga
Osipyan 9'; Radionova 11', 75'; Korsun 45+1', 82'	Report

Hévízi úti Stadion, Budapest
Attendance: 52
Referee: Iríni Pingíou (Greece)

4 September 2024
16:30

Ferencváros (Hungary)	2–1	(Estonia) Flora
Edwards 1', 62'	Report	Lillemäe 5'

Hévízi úti Stadion, Budapest
Attendance: 481
Referee: Rita Vehapi (Kosovo)

===== Third-place play-off =====
7 September 2024
12:00

SFK Rīga (Latvia)	0–0 (a.e.t.)	(Estonia) Flora
	Report
Penalties
Poļuhoviča (penalty scored); Rožaščonoka (penalty scored); Teļukeviča (penalty missed); Ohadiwe (penalty scored); Baļičeva (penalty scored); Malinovska (penalty missed); Vainere (penalty scored); Valaka (penalty scored); Hropataja (penalty missed)	6–7	(penalty scored) Palts; (penalty scored) Räämet; (penalty scored) Tammik; (penalty scored) Smirnova; (penalty missed) Lillemäe; (penalty missed) Purgats; (penalty scored) Panova; (penalty scored) Tarkmeel; (penalty scored) Õispuu

Hévízi úti Stadion, Budapest
Attendance: 31
Referee: Emilie Torkelsen (Norway)

===== Final =====
7 September 2024
16:30

Vorskla Poltava (Ukraine)	2–0	(Hungary) Ferencváros
Korsun 29'; Kravchuk 90+4'	Report

Hévízi úti Stadion, Budapest
Attendance: 428
Referee: Zulema González (Spain)

==== Tournament 11 ====
===== Bracket =====
Hosted by Farul Constanța.

Semi-finals
4 September
(Kosovo) Mitrovica	0
(Romania) Farul Constanța	4

Final
7 September
(Norway) Vålerenga	3
(Romania) Farul Constanța	1

===== Semi-finals =====
4 September 2024
17:00 (18:00 UTC+3)

Mitrovica (Kosovo)	0–4	(Romania) Farul Constanța
	Report	Rus 48'; Stancu 58'; Tabita 76'; Țabur 84'

Central Stadium, Ovidiu
Attendance: 864
Referee: Reelika Turi (Estonia)

===== Final =====
7 September 2024
14:00 (15:00 UTC+3)

Vålerenga (Norway)	3–1	(Romania) Farul Constanța
Thorsnes 45+3'; Thomsen 48'; Sævik 78'	Report	Bratu 15'

Central Stadium, Ovidiu
Attendance: 768
Referee: Gamze Durmuş (Turkey)

=== League Path ===
==== Tournament 1 ====
===== Bracket =====
Hosted by Brøndby.

Semi-finals
4 September
(Denmark) Brøndby	0
(Italy) Fiorentina	1
4 September
(Netherlands) Ajax (a.e.t.)	4
(Ukraine) Kolos Kovalivka	1

Final
7 September
(Italy) Fiorentina	1
(Netherlands) Ajax	0
Third place
7 September
(Denmark) Brøndby	2
(Ukraine) Kolos Kovalivka	1

===== Semi-finals =====
4 September 2024
14:00

Ajax (Netherlands)	4–1 (a.e.t.)	(Ukraine) Kolos Kovalivka
Hoekstra 65'; Keukelaar 96'; Noordman 109'; Sabajo 113'	Report	Tian 26'

Brøndby Stadium 2, Brøndbyvester
Attendance: 84
Referee: Eszter Urbán (Hungary)

4 September 2024
18:00

Brøndby (Denmark)	0–1	(Italy) Fiorentina
	Report	Bonfantini 39'

Brøndby Stadium 2, Brøndbyvester
Attendance: 750
Referee: Miriama Bočková (Slovakia)

===== Third-place play-off =====
7 September 2024
12:00

Brøndby (Denmark)	2–1	(Ukraine) Kolos Kovalivka
Buchberg 9'; Hornemann 90+3'	Report	Voronina 90+2'

Brøndby Stadium 2, Brøndbyvester
Attendance: 164
Referee: Franziska Wildfeuer (Germany)

===== Final =====
7 September 2024
16:00

Ajax (Netherlands)	0–1	(Italy) Fiorentina
	Report	Janogy 82'

Brøndby Stadium 2, Brøndbyvester
Attendance: 130
Referee: Abigail Byrne (England)

==== Tournament 2 ====
===== Bracket =====
Hosted by Linköping.

Semi-finals
4 September
(Czech Republic) Sparta Prague (a.e.t.)	3
(Sweden) Linköping	1
4 September
(France) Paris FC	9
(Austria) First Vienna	0

Final
7 September
(Czech Republic) Sparta Prague	0
(France) Paris FC	2
Third place
7 September
(Sweden) Linköping	8
(Austria) First Vienna	0

===== Semi-finals =====
4 September 2024
14:00

Paris FC (France)	9–0	(Austria) First Vienna
Bourdieu 5', 40', 55'; Dufour 44', 46'; Thiney 52'; Bussy 87', 90+3'; Corboz 90'	Report

Linköping Arena, Linköping
Attendance: 141
Referee: Hristiyana Guteva (Bulgaria)

4 September 2024
19:00

Sparta Prague (Czech Republic)	3–1 (a.e.t.)	(Sweden) Linköping
N. Karlsson 67' (o.g.); Kotrčová 103'; Bartoňová 119' (pen.)	Report	Beard 48'

Linköping Arena, Linköping
Attendance: 553
Referee: Réka Molnár (Hungary)

===== Third-place play-off =====
7 September 2024
13:00

Linköping (Sweden)	8–0	(Austria) First Vienna
N. Karlsson 27'; Ólafsdóttir Grós 33'; Dirdal 45+2', 48', 79'; Höcherl 49' (o.g.); Doran 63'; Lundin 75'	Report

Linköping Arena, Linköping
Attendance: 275
Referee: Volha Blotskaya (Belarus)

===== Final =====
7 September 2024
18:00

Paris FC (France)	2–0	(Czech Republic) Sparta Prague
Matéo 36'; Korošec 85'	Report

Linköping Arena, Linköping
Attendance: 179
Referee: Deborah Anex (Switzerland)

==== Tournament 3 ====
===== Bracket =====
Hosted by Arsenal.

Semi-finals
4 September
(England) Arsenal	6
(Scotland) Rangers	0
4 September
(Spain) Atlético Madrid	2 (2)
(Norway) Rosenborg (a.e.t.) (p)	2 (3)

Final
7 September
(England) Arsenal	1
(Norway) Rosenborg	0
Third place
7 September
(Scotland) Rangers	0
(Spain) Atlético Madrid	3

===== Semi-finals =====
4 September 2024
13:00 (12:00 UTC+1)

Atlético Madrid (Spain)	2–2 (a.e.t.)	(Norway) Rosenborg
Fiamma 20'; Lauren 119'	Report	Holum 90+1'; Tomter 105+1'
Penalties
Otermin (penalty missed); Jensen (penalty scored); G. García (penalty scored); Pinto (penalty missed); Medina (penalty missed)	2–3	(penalty scored) Åhgren Sørum; (penalty missed) Marcussen; (penalty scored) Dahl; (penalty scored) Harviken

Meadow Park, Borehamwood
Attendance: 494
Referee: Jelena Pejković (Croatia)

4 September 2024
20:30 (19:30 UTC+1)

Arsenal (England)	6–0	(Scotland) Rangers
Foord 16', 59', 69', 90'; Russo 60'; Little 86' (pen.)	Report

Meadow Park, Borehamwood
Attendance: 3,487
Referee: Rasa Grigonė (Lithuania)

===== Third-place play-off =====
7 September 2024
13:00 (12:00 UTC+1)

Atlético Madrid (Spain)	3–0	(Scotland) Rangers
Jensen 42'; Guijarro 63'; Bøe Risa 77'	Report

Meadow Park, Borehamwood
Attendance: 824
Referee: Minka Vekkeli (Finland)

===== Final =====
7 September 2024
20:30 (19:30 UTC+1)

Arsenal (England)	1–0	(Norway) Rosenborg
Maanum 19'	Report

Meadow Park, Borehamwood
Attendance: 3,164
Referee: Michalina Diakow (Poland)

==== Tournament 4 ====
===== Bracket =====
Hosted by Breiðablik.

Semi-finals
4 September
(Belarus) FC Minsk	1
(Iceland) Breiðablik	6
4 September
(Germany) Eintracht Frankfurt	0
(Portugal) Sporting CP	2

Final
7 September
(Iceland) Breiðablik	0
(Portugal) Sporting CP	2
Third place
7 September
(Belarus) FC Minsk	0
(Germany) Eintracht Frankfurt	6

===== Semi-finals =====
4 September 2024
16:00 (14:00 UTC+0)

Eintracht Frankfurt (Germany)	0–2	(Portugal) Sporting CP
	Report	Cláudia Neto 14'; Ana Borges 90+4'

Kópavogsvöllur, Kópavogur
Attendance: 94
Referee: Zuzana Valentová (Slovakia)

4 September 2024
21:00 (19:00 UTC+0)

FC Minsk (Belarus)	1–6	(Iceland) Breiðablik
Miroshnichenko 39'	Report	V. Kristjánsdóttir 2'; Ásbjörnsdóttir 23', 53', 79'; A. Bjarnadóttir 26'; Smith 34'

Kópavogsvöllur, Kópavogur
Attendance: 264
Referee: Katalin Sipos (Hungary)

===== Third-place play-off =====
7 September 2024
14:00 (12:00 UTC+0)

Eintracht Frankfurt (Germany)	6–0	(Belarus) FC Minsk
Chiba 12', 90'; Freigang 15', 28', 45+2'; Gräwe 69'	Report

Kópavogsvöllur, Kópavogur
Attendance: 86
Referee: Araksya Saribekyan (Armenia)

===== Final =====
7 September 2024
19:00 (17:00 UTC+0)

Breiðablik (Iceland)	0–2	(Portugal) Sporting CP
	Report	Encarnação 4', 74'

Kópavogsvöllur, Kópavogur
Attendance: 704
Referee: Deborah Bianchi (Italy)

== Round 2 ==
=== Seeding ===
A total of 24 teams played in Round 2. The draw was held on 9 September 2024.

In the Champions Path, there were seven seeded teams and seven unseeded teams. In the League Path, there were five seeded teams and five unseeded teams. Clubs from the same association could not be drawn into the same pairing.

Champions Path
Seeded	Unseeded
(Portugal) Benfica; (Czech Republic) Slavia Prague; (Austria) St. Pölten; (Italy) Roma; (Netherlands) Twente; (Norway) Vålerenga; (Ukraine) Vorskla Poltava	(Belgium) Anderlecht; (Switzerland) Servette; (Slovenia) ŽNK Mura; (Croatia) Osijek; (Scotland) Celtic; (Sweden) Hammarby; (Turkey) Galatasaray

League Path
Seeded	Unseeded
(France) Paris Saint-Germain; (Germany) VfL Wolfsburg; (England) Arsenal; (Spain) Real Madrid; (England) Manchester City	(Italy) Juventus; (Sweden) BK Häcken; (France) Paris FC; (Italy) Fiorentina; (Portugal) Sporting CP

=== Summary ===
The first legs were played on 18, 19 and 22 September, and the second legs on 25 and 26 September 2024.

The winners of the ties advanced to the group stage.

Round 2
Team 1	Agg.	Team 2	1st leg	2nd leg
Champions Path
St. Pölten (Austria)	8–0	(Slovenia) ŽNK Mura	3–0	5–0
Hammarby (Sweden)	3–2 (Note: Order of legs reversed after original draw.)	(Portugal) Benfica	1–2	2–0
Osijek (Croatia)	1–8	(Netherlands) Twente	1–4	0–4
Galatasaray (Turkey)	4–3	(Czech Republic) Slavia Prague	2–2	2–1 (a.e.t.)
Roma (Italy)	10–3	(Switzerland) Servette	3–1	7–2
Anderlecht (Belgium)	1–5	(Norway) Vålerenga	1–2	0–3
Vorskla Poltava (Ukraine)	0–3	(Scotland) Celtic	0–1	0–2
League Path
Sporting CP (Portugal)	2–5	(Spain) Real Madrid	1–2	1–3
Juventus (Italy)	5–2	(France) Paris Saint-Germain	3–1	2–1
Paris FC (France)	0–8	(England) Manchester City	0–5	0–3
Fiorentina (Italy)	0–12	(Germany) VfL Wolfsburg	0–7	0–5
BK Häcken (Sweden)	1–4	(England) Arsenal	1–0	0–4

==== Champions Path ====
19 September 2024
19:00

St. Pölten (Austria)	3–0	(Slovenia) ŽNK Mura
Dubcová 65'; Pekel 73'; Križaj 79'	Report

NV Arena, Sankt Pölten
Attendance: 627
Referee: Volha Blotskaya (Belarus)
26 September 2024
19:00

ŽNK Mura (Slovenia)	0–5	(Austria) St. Pölten
	Report	Mädl 3', 10'; Pekel 34'; Vračević 67'; Zver 88' (pen.)

Fazanerija City Stadium, Murska Sobota
Attendance: 1,198
Referee: Eleni Antoniou (Greece)

St. Pölten won 8–0 on aggregate.

18 September 2024
19:00

Hammarby (Sweden)	1–2	(Portugal) Benfica
Blakstad 16'	Report	Martín-Prieto 39'; Norton 47'

Tele2 Arena, Stockholm
Attendance: 12,062
Referee: Miriama Bočková (Slovakia)
25 September 2024
21:00 (20:00 UTC+1)

Benfica (Portugal)	0–2	(Sweden) Hammarby
	Report	Blakstad 16'; Tandberg 90+5'

Benfica Campus, Lisbon
Attendance: 812
Referee: Désirée Grundbacher (Switzerland)

Hammarby won 3–2 on aggregate.

18 September 2024
14:30

Osijek (Croatia)	1–4	(Netherlands) Twente
Balić 27'	Report	Peddemors 7'; Tuin 54'; Van Dijk 70'; Andradóttir 77'

Stadion Gradski vrt, Osijek
Attendance: 100
Referee: Michalina Diakow (Poland)
26 September 2024
19:45

Twente (Netherlands)	4–0	(Croatia) Osijek
Van Dooren 25'; Tuin 38'; Te Brake 45+1'; Galic 50'	Report

De Grolsch Veste, Enschede
Attendance: 1,619
Referee: Olatz Rivera Olmedo (Spain)

Twente won 8–1 on aggregate.

19 September 2024
19:00 (20:00 UTC+3)

Galatasaray (Turkey)	2–2	(Czech Republic) Slavia Prague
Stašková 56', 66'	Report	Szewieczková 76'; Košíková 90+8'

Rams Park, Istanbul
Attendance: 1,412
Referee: Ana Maria Terteleac (Romania)
25 September 2024
18:00

Slavia Prague (Czech Republic)	1–2 (a.e.t.)	(Turkey) Galatasaray
Karataş 31' (o.g.)	Report	Karabulut 50'; Parlak 100'

Fortuna Arena, Prague
Attendance: 4,113
Referee: Hristiyana Guteva (Bulgaria)

Galatasaray won 4–3 on aggregate.

18 September 2024
14:30

Roma (Italy)	3–1	(Switzerland) Servette
Minami 38'; Viens 85', 90+3'	Report	Korhonen 55'

Stadio Tre Fontane, Rome
Attendance: 1,199
Referee: Abigail Byrne (England)
26 September 2024
19:00

Servette (Switzerland)	2–7	(Italy) Roma
Saoud 23'; Marchão 59'	Report	Haavi 12'; Dragoni 14', 56'; Giugliano 42'; Kumagai 45+1'; Giacinti 62', 90'

Stade de Genève, Geneva
Attendance: 6,107
Referee: Jelena Cvetković (Serbia)

Roma won 10–3 on aggregate.

18 September 2024
19:30

Anderlecht (Belgium)	1–2	(Norway) Vålerenga
Vătafu 29'	Report	Kovacs 14'; Sævik 16'

King Baudouin Stadium, Brussels
Attendance: 351
Referee: Deborah Bianchi (Italy)
25 September 2024
18:30

Vålerenga (Norway)	3–0	(Belgium) Anderlecht
Bjelde 70'; Thomsen 75'; Sævik 81'	Report

Intility Arena, Oslo
Attendance: 2,129
Referee: Alina Peşu (Romania)

Vålerenga won 5–1 on aggregate.

22 September 2024
13:00 (12:00 UTC+1)

Vorskla Poltava (Ukraine)	0–1	(Scotland) Celtic
	Report	Agnew 5'

Excelsior Stadium, Airdrie, Scotland (Note: Due to the Russian invasion of Ukraine, Ukrainian teams are required to play their home matches at neutral venues until further notice.)
Attendance: 744
Referee: Michaela Pachtova (Czech Republic)
26 September 2024
20:15 (19:15 UTC+1)

Celtic (Scotland)	2–0	(Ukraine) Vorskla Poltava
Lawton 52'; McGregor 62'	Report

Excelsior Stadium, Airdrie
Attendance: 1,149
Referee: Lina Lehtovaara (Finland)

Celtic won 3–0 on aggregate.

==== League Path ====
19 September 2024
17:00 (16:00 UTC+1)

Sporting CP (Portugal)	1–2	(Spain) Real Madrid
Bravo 45+4' (pen.)	Report	Athenea 11'; Leupolz 90+6'

Aurélio Pereira Stadium, Alcochete
Attendance: 624
Referee: Emanuela Rusta (Albania)
26 September 2024
20:00

Real Madrid (Spain)	3–1	(Portugal) Sporting CP
Toletti 7', 51'; Redondo 90+4'	Report	Capeta 5'

Alfredo Di Stéfano, Madrid
Attendance: 1,238
Referee: Shona Shukrula (Netherlands)

Real Madrid won 5–2 on aggregate.

18 September 2024
19:00

Juventus (Italy)	3–1	(France) Paris Saint-Germain
Vangsgaard 7'; Cantore 34'; Bennison 61'	Report	Samoura 12'

Stadio Vittorio Pozzo, Biella
Attendance: 1,080
Referee: Fabienne Michel (Germany)
26 September 2024
18:45

Paris Saint-Germain (France)	1–2	(Italy) Juventus
Leuchter 54' (pen.)	Report	Cantore 3'; Bonansea 72'

Campus PSG, Poissy
Attendance: 807
Referee: Frida Klarlund (Denmark)

Juventus won 5–2 on aggregate.

18 September 2024
18:45

Paris FC (France)	0–5	(England) Manchester City
	Report	Miedema 36'; Park 38', 58'; Fowler 49'; Kelly 79'

Stade Sébastien Charléty, Paris
Attendance: 3,633
Referee: Sandra Bastos (Portugal)
26 September 2024
20:00 (19:00 UTC+1)

Manchester City (England)	3–0	(France) Paris FC
Kelly 2'; Shaw 31', 65' (pen.)	Report

Academy Stadium, Manchester
Attendance: 1,971
Referee: Ewa Augustyn (Poland)

Manchester City won 8–0 on aggregate.

18 September 2024
20:00

Fiorentina (Italy)	0–7	(Germany) VfL Wolfsburg
	Report	Hegering 6', 24'; Popp 38', 53', 57'; Brand 44'; Endemann 83'

Curva Fiesole, Florence
Attendance: 476
Referee: Minka Vekkeli (Finland)
25 September 2024
18:30

VfL Wolfsburg (Germany)	5–0	(Italy) Fiorentina
Kalma 3'; Endemann 33', 49'; Brand 77'; Sellner 89'	Report

AOK Stadion, Wolfsburg
Attendance: 1,956
Referee: Stéphanie Frappart (France)

VfL Wolfsburg won 12–0 on aggregate.

18 September 2024
19:00

BK Häcken (Sweden)	1–0	(England) Arsenal
Tindell 77'	Report

Hisingen Arena, Gothenburg
Attendance: 5,862
Referee: Riem Hussein (Germany)
26 September 2024
20:30 (19:30 UTC+1)

Arsenal (England)	4–0	(Sweden) BK Häcken
Wälti 23'; Caldentey 40'; Mead 49'; Maanum 78'	Report

Meadow Park, Borehamwood
Attendance: 2,828
Referee: Catarina Campos (Portugal)

Arsenal won 4–1 on aggregate.
