= Rojin =

Rojin may refer to:

== Given name ==
- Rojin Polat (born 2004), Australian-Turkish women's footballer
- Rojina Shrestha, Miss Nepal 2017
- Rojin Thomas (born 1992), Indian film director

== Surname ==
- David Alejandro Rojina (born 1988), Mexican former footballer

== See also ==
- Rōjin to Rabudōru: Watashi ga Shochō ni Natta Toki, is a 2009 Japanese science-fiction fantasy pink film
- Roujin Z, is a 1991 Japanese animated science fiction action thriller film
