= Rita Fontemanha =

Portuguese footballer

Personal information
- Full name: Rita Filipa Gonçalves Fontemanha
- Date of birth: 13 November 1993 (age 32)
- Place of birth: Cedofeita, Portugal
- Height: 1.64 m (5 ft 5 in)
- Position: Defender

Team information
- Current team: Sporting CP
- Number: 8

Senior career*
Years	Team	Apps	(Gls)
2009–2014	Boavista	28	(9)
2014–2016	Atlético Madrid	9	(0)
2016–	Sporting CP	97	(14)

International career^{‡}
2010–2012	Portugal U19	22	(2)
2015–2016	Portugal	2	(0)
- * Club domestic league appearances and goals as of 17 Feb 2023 ‡ National team caps and goals as of 17 Feb 2023

Rita Fontemanha (born 13 November 1993) is a Portuguese footballer who plays as a defender for Sporting CP and formerly the Portugal national team.

== Club career ==
Prior to her career in football, Fontemanha played tennis. Following a season in which she broke into Boavista's senior team, it was announced, on 6 August 2014, that she would be transferring to Spanish club Atlético Madrid. Following two seasons in Madrid, she joined Sporting CP in Portugal. At Sporting, she played predominantly as a full-back. In June 2018, Fontemanha extended her contract with Sporting, committing herself to the club until 2022.

== International career ==
Fontemanha made her debut for the Portugal national team on 21 September 2015 against Ukraine.
