= Georgia Eaton-Collins =

English footballer

Personal information
- Date of birth: 9 June 2000 (age 26)
- Place of birth: Ipswich, England
- Height: 1.69 m (5 ft 7 in)
- Position: Defender

Team information
- Current team: Sporting CP

Youth career
- –2018: Arsenal

College career
Years	Team	Apps	(Gls)
2018–2021	Florida Gators		
2021–2022	UCF Knights		

Senior career*
Years	Team	Apps	(Gls)
2023	Leicester City	6	(0)
2023–2024	HB Køge	22	(1)
2024–	Sporting CP	34	(2)
- * Club domestic league appearances and goals

Georgia Eaton-Collins (born 9 June 2000) is an English footballer who plays as a defender and captains Sporting CP.
