= Andreia Bravo =

Portuguese footballer

Personal information
- Full name: Andreia Filipa Ramires Bravo
- Date of birth: 26 March 2005 (age 21)
- Position: Midfielder

Senior career*
Years	Team	Apps	(Gls)
2021-	Sporting CP	42	(5)

International career^{‡}
2025-	Portugal	2	(0)
- * Club domestic league appearances and goals as of 21 June 2025 ‡ National team caps and goals as of 21 June 2025

Andreia Bravo (born 26 March 2005) is a Portuguese professional footballer who played as a Midfielder for Sporting Lisbon and the Portugal women's national football team.

== International career ==
Bravo received her first call up against Azerbaijan.
