= Escharen =

Dutch village

- Village
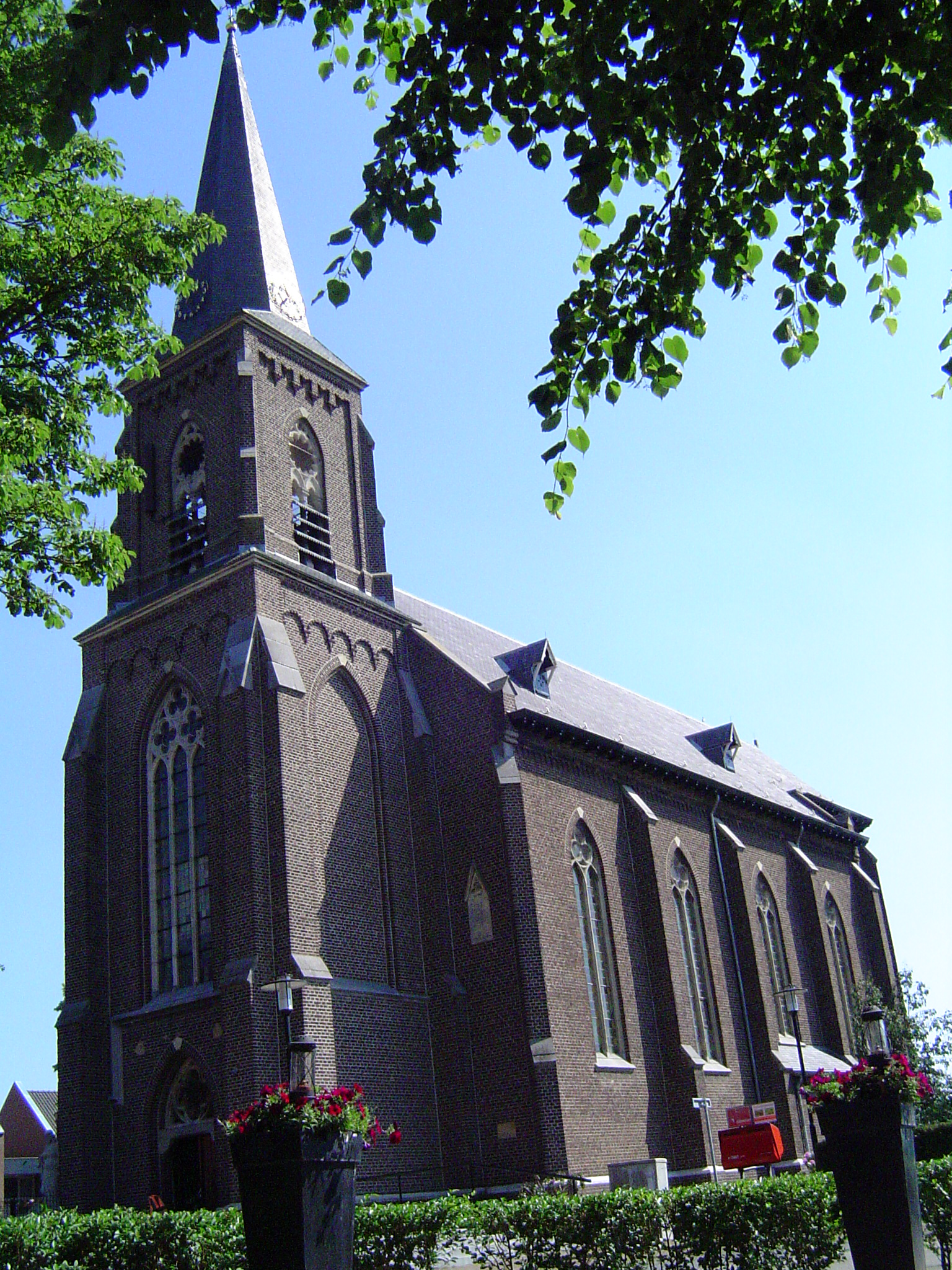
- St Lambert's Church

- Location in the province of North Brabant in the Netherlands Escharen (Netherlands)
- Coordinates: 51°44′39″N 5°44′41″E
- Country: Netherlands
- Province: North Brabant
- Municipality: Land van Cuijk

Area
  - Total: 9.24 km^{2} (3.57 sq mi)
- Elevation: 9 m (30 ft)

Population (2021)
  - Total: 1,185
  - Density: 128/km^{2} (332/sq mi)
- Time zone: UTC+1 (CET)
  - Summer (DST): UTC+2 (CEST)
- Postal code: 5364
- Dialing code: 0486

Escharen is a village in the Dutch province of North Brabant. It is located in the former municipality of Grave. Since 2022 it has been part of the new municipality of Land van Cuijk.

== History ==
The village was first mentioned between 1200 and 1225 as Escre, and means "sandy ridge". The Escharen Hoard was discovered in the area in 1897, including two of the known specimens of Audulf's tremisses. The coins are believed to date to around the year 600, at the end of the Migration Period.

The St Lambert's Church was built between 1863 and 1865 as a replacement of an earlier church. It was extended in 1930. The town hall was built in 1876 in neoclassic style. The stepped gable was added around 1900.

Escharen was home to 244 people in 1840. Escharen was a separate municipality until 1942, when its territory was divided between Grave and Mill en Sint Hubert. In 2022, it became part of Land van Cuijk.

== Gallery ==
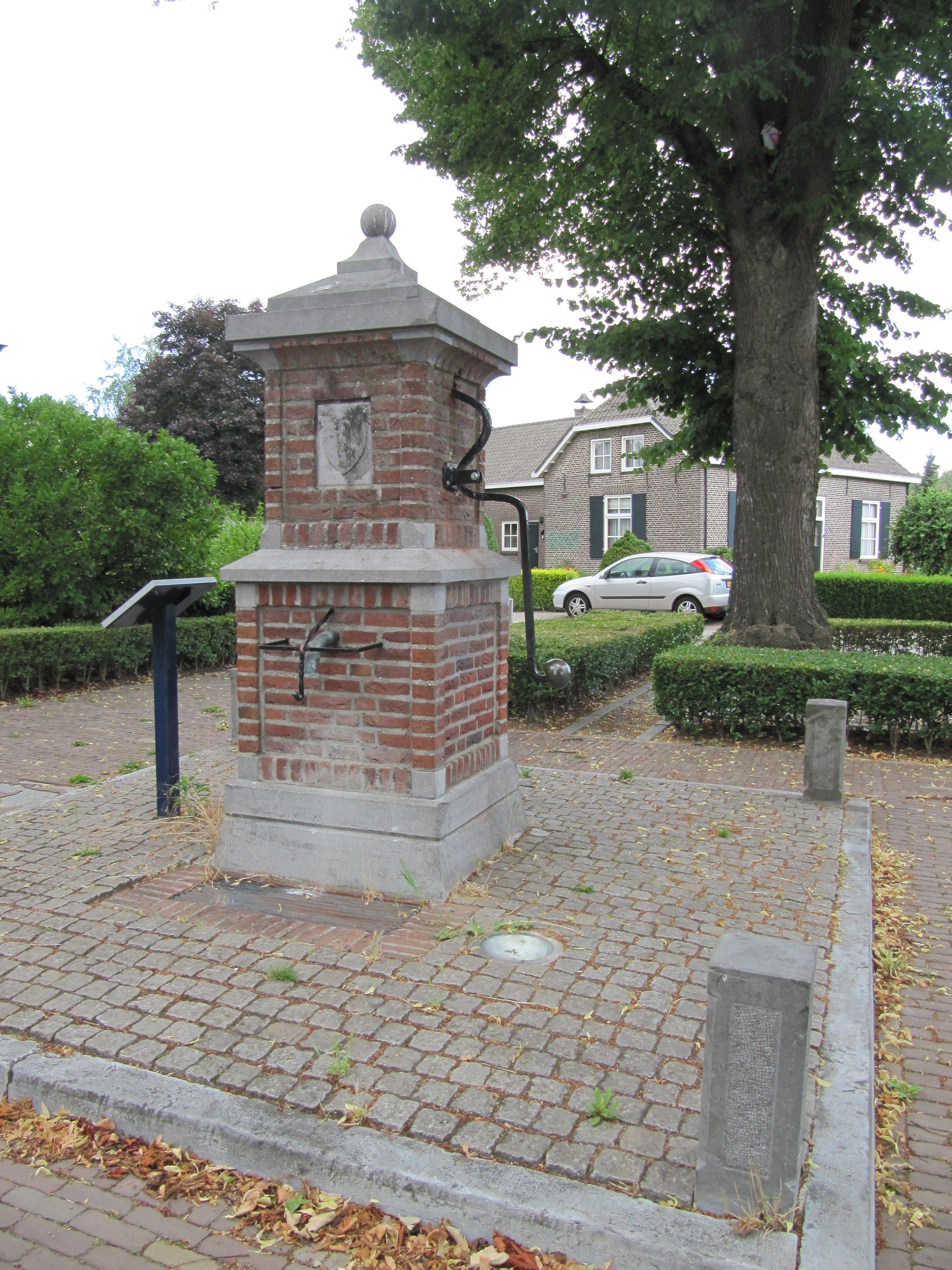
Village pump

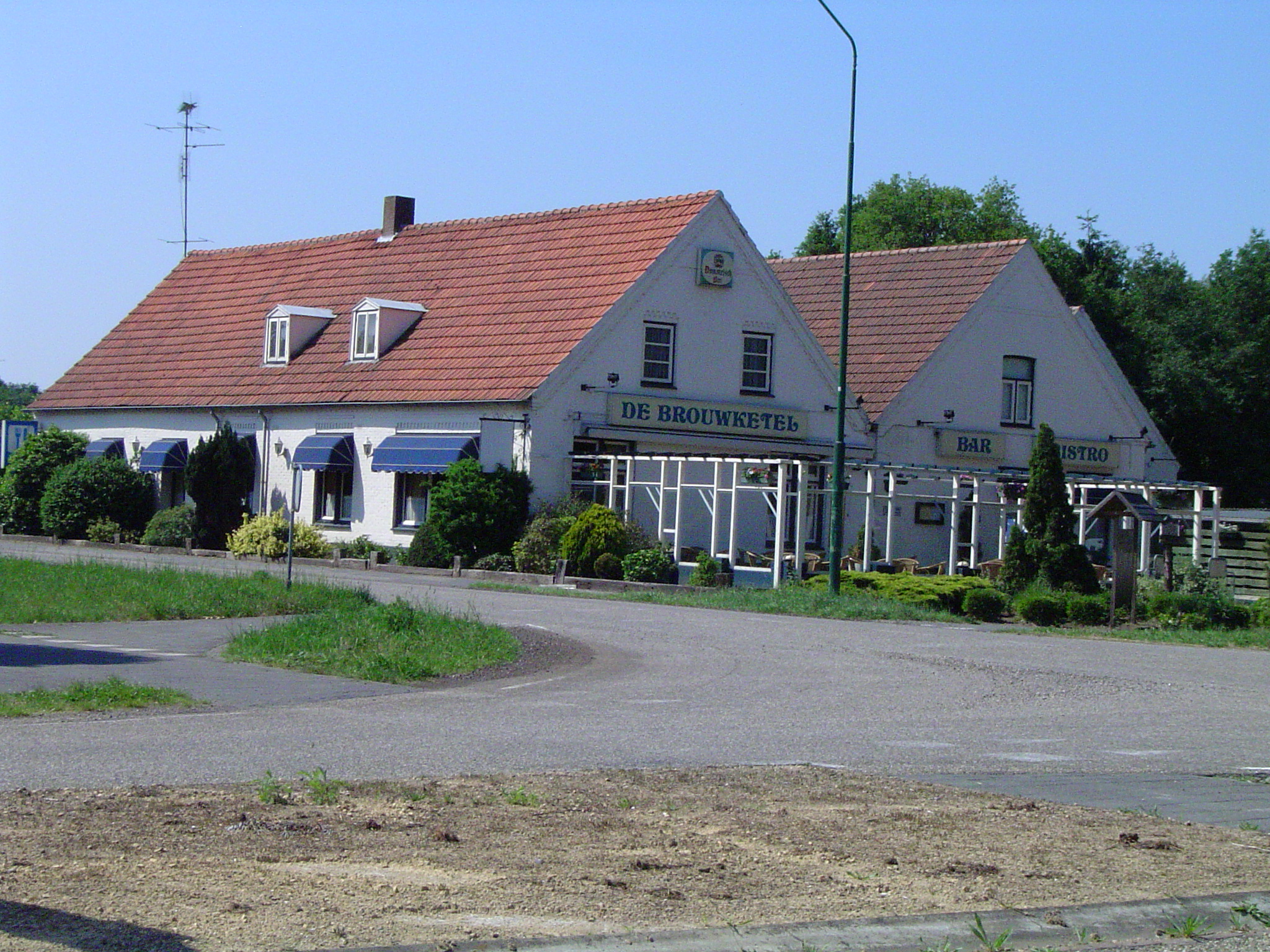
Bar restaurant

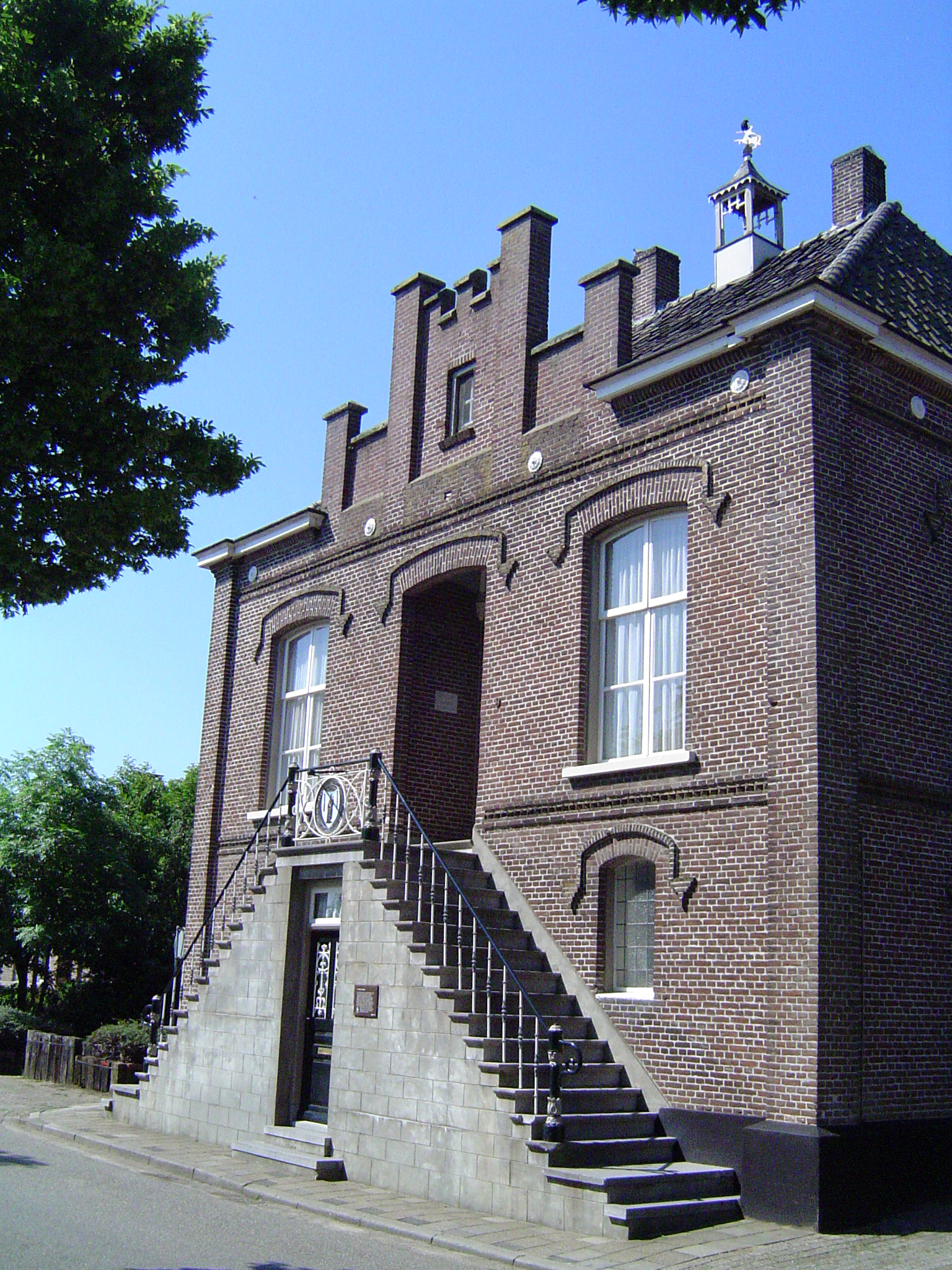
Former town hall
