= Sædís Rún Heiðarsdóttir =

Icelandic footballer (born 2005)

Personal information
- Date of birth: 16 September 2004 (age 22)
- Height: 1.70 m (5 ft 7 in)
- Position: Left-back

Team information
- Current team: 1. FC Köln
- Number: 3

Senior career*
Years	Team	Apps	(Gls)
2020–2023	Stjarnan	71	(3)
2024–2026	Vålerenga	53	(8)
2026–	1. FC Köln	1	(0)

International career^{‡}
2019–2021	Iceland U17	2	(0)
2021–2023	Iceland U19	3	(0)
2023–	Iceland	29	(0)
- * Club domestic league appearances and goals as of 22 August 2026 ‡ National team caps and goals as of 16 July 2026

Sædís Rún Heiðarsdóttir (born 16 September 2004) is an Icelandic professional footballer who plays as a left-back for Frauen-Bundesliga club 1. FC Köln and the Iceland national team.

== International career ==
Sædís was part of Iceland's 23-player squad for the UEFA Women's Euro 2025 in Switzerland.

== Career statistics ==
=== International ===
As of match played

Appearances and goals by national team and year
National team	Year	Apps	Goals
Iceland
Iceland	2023	5	0
Iceland	2024	8	0
Iceland	2025	10	0
Iceland	2026	6	0
Total		29	0
