= Sporting CP (women's football) =

- Full name: Sporting Clube de Portugal
- Nicknames: Leões (Lions); Verde e brancos (Green and whites)
- Short name: Sporting
- Founded: 12 June 2016; 10 years ago
- Ground: Estádio José Alvalade
- Capacity: 52,095
- President: Frederico Varandas
- Head coach: Mariana Cabral
- League: Campeonato Nacional Feminino
- 2025–26: 2nd
- Website: https://www.sporting.pt/en/
Home colours	Away colours	Third colours

Sporting Clube de Portugal (Portuguese pronunciation: [sɨˈpɔɾtĩ ˈkluβɨ ðɨ puɾtuˈɣal]), otherwise referred to as Sporting CP, is a Portuguese women's football team from Lisbon, Portugal.

Sporting CP plays at the Estádio Aurélio Pereira in the Academia Cristiano Ronaldo, located in Alcochete, which holds a seating capacity of 1,180 spectators.

== History ==
In October 1991, the president of the club, Sousa Cintra, announced the formation of the women’s football team. The idea for the new team came from Diamantino Batista, who would become the first women's football coach at Sporting CP. Through open trials, it was possible to assemble the first squad of 23 players.

The women’s team played their first match on 24 November 1991 at Campo de Arroios, suffering a 3-2 defeat against Académico de Alvalade in a Regional Championship fixture. Over four seasons, between 1991/1992 and 1994/1995, Sporting CP consistently qualified for the final stages of the Campeonato Nacional Feminino, but never won the title. The highlight of the club's first phase of women's football was the victory in the Torneio de Abertura, which replaced the 1992/1993 Campeonato Regional.

In July 1994, Sporting CP became the first Portuguese club to establish training academies dedicated exclusively to women’s football.

However, on 1 August 1995, the club’s president, Santana Lopes, following the closure of several sports sections with a view to making the club sustainable, announced the closure of the women’s football team.

In the 2016/2017 season, the Portuguese Football Federation decided to take a significant step forward in women’s football in Portugal by inviting clubs from the Primeira Liga to enter the Campeonato Nacional Feminino directly. Sporting CP, through its president Bruno de Carvalho, was one of four clubs to accept the invitation, meaning the league was automatically expanded to 14 clubs competing for the title in a format of two rounds of matches, with every team playing each other twice.

With the revival of Sporting CP’s women’s football team, along with the signing of a completely new senior squad, the necessary training facilities were established at the Academia Cristiano Ronaldo, where the Under-19 and Under-17 teams were formed. At the Pólo EUL, an expansion was carried out to accommodate the Under-8 and Under-13 teams, marking the start of a new women’s football development system at the club.

In the first season after the return, on 25 February 2017, a women’s football match was played for the first time at the Estádio José Alvalade. A crowd of 9,000 spectators saw Sporting CP beat S.C. Braga by 1-0, a result that allowed the club to take the lead in the league, which it would go on to win, for the first time in its history. With the league title win, Sporting CP qualified for the first time for the UEFA Women's Champions League.

On 4 June 2017, Sporting CP and S.C. Braga faced each other again in the final of the Taça de Portugal Feminina, played at the Estádio Nacional. Once again, Sporting CP won 2–1, securing the first double in their history.

The following season, 2017/2018, began with the club’s first-ever victory in the Supertaça de Portugal Feminina, once again against S.C. Braga, winning 3–1 in extra time. Sporting CP went on to win the Campeonato de Futebol Feminino and the Taça de Portugal Feminina once again, thereby securing the first treble in its history.

In 2018, Sporting CP announced the creation of a women’s B team, launching its youth development system, which now also includes a Under-19 team and a Under-15 team. The reserve teams in Portugal compete in the same league system as the senior main team, instead of a reserve teams league. However, the reserve teams cannot participate in the same division as the first team, which means that Sporting B is not eligible for promotion to the Campeonato Nacional Feminino and cannot compete in the Taça de Portugal Feminina or the Taça da Liga Feminina.

Three years after its formation, Sporting CP B secured its first title by winning the Campeonato Nacional II Divisão Feminino in the 2020/2021 season.

In 2019, the first-ever Lisbon women’s football derby was played between Sporting CP and S.L. Benfica. This match, held at the Estádio do Restelo, was organised to raise funds for Mozambique following the natural disaster caused by Cyclone Idai, and ended in a 1–0 victory for Sporting CP.

In the 2025/2026 season, Sporting CP became the first Portuguese club to compete in the newly created UEFA Women's Europa Cup, reaching the quarter-finals, where they were knocked out by Hammarby.

== Competitive record ==
Season	League	Cup	Supercup	League Cup	Regional league	UEFA Women's Champions League
1991–92	3rd	—	—	—	2nd	—
1992–93	3rd	—	—	—	1st	—
1993–94	5th	—	—	—	—	—
1994–95	4th	—	—	—	—	—
—	—	—	—	—	—	
2016–17	1st	Winners	—	—	—	—
2017–18	1st	Winners	Winners	—	—	Qualifying Round
2018–19	2nd	R16	2nd	—	—	Qualifying Round
2019–20	Abandoned	R16	—	3rd	—	-
2020–21	2nd	Abandoned	—	2nd	—	-
2021–22	2nd	Winner	Winner	SF	—	-
2022–23	2nd	QF	2nd	SF	—	-
2023–24	2nd	SF	2nd	2nd	—	-
2024–25	2nd	QF	Winner	2nd	—	Qualifying Round

== Players ==
=== Current squad ===
As of 10 July 2026

Note: Flags indicate national team as defined under FIFA eligibility rules; some limited exceptions apply. Players may hold more than one non-FIFA nationality.

No.	Pos.	Nation	Player
2	MF	CAN	Jeneva Hernandez-Gray
3	DF	POR	Carolina Pimenta
4	DF	POR	Érica Cancelinha
6	DF	ENG	Georgia Eaton-Collins
7	MF	POR	Joana Martins
8	DF	POR	Rita Fontemanha
9	FW	POR	Telma Encarnação
10	FW	POR	Ana Capeta
11	MF	ESP	Brenda Pérez
12	DF	USA	Madison Haugen
13	FW	POR	Carolina Santiago
14	MF	ESP	Daniela Arques
17	MF	POR	Cláudia Neto

No.	Pos.	Nation	Player
19	FW	ARG	Florencia Bonsegundo
20	FW	ESP	Carla Armengol
21	MF	POR	Samara Lino
22	GK	POR	Catarina Potra
23	MF	POR	Rita Almeida
26	DF	USA	Mackenzie Cherry
27	FW	POR	Matilde Nave
33	GK	POL	Julia Wozniak
39	MF	POR	Andreia Bravo
41	DF	USA	Ashley Barron
42	FW	POR	Maísa Correia
77	DF	POR	Tânia Rodrigues
78	FW	USA	Miri O'Donnell
—	GK	USA	Eva-Jean Young
—	DF	POR	Íris Fernandes
—	DF	POR	Dária Kaminska
—	DF	POR	Ágata Filipa
—	DF	POR	Madalena Marau

== Honours ==
=== Domestic Competitions ===
- Campeonato Nacional Feminino: 2

2016/2017, 2017/2018

- Taça de Portugal Feminina: 3

2016/2017, 2017/2018, 2021/2022

- Supertaça de Portugal Feminina: 3

2017, 2021, 2024

Sporting CP B

- Campeonato Nacional II Divisão Feminino: 1

2021/2022

Under-19

- Liga Feminina Juniores A: 2

2022/2023, 2025/2026
