= Nicole Ojukwu =

Austrian footballer (born 2005)

Personal information
- Full name: Nicole Ifeyinwa Ojukwu
- Date of birth: 28 November 2005 (age 20)
- Place of birth: Vienna, Austria
- Height: 1.63 m (5 ft 4 in)
- Position: Midfielder

Team information
- Current team: SC Freiburg
- Number: 6

Senior career*
Years	Team	Apps	(Gls)
2021	First Vienna FC	6	(0)
2021–2022	ÖFB-Frauen-Akademie		
2022–2024	First Vienna FC	34	(4)
2024–	SC Freiburg	50	(4)

International career^{‡}
2020–2022	Austria U17	13	(4)
2022–2024	Austria U19	26	(11)
2023–2024	Austria U20	9	(4)
2023–	Austria	4	(0)
- * Club domestic league appearances and goals as of 22 November 2026 ‡ National team caps and goals as of 14 October 2026

Nicole Ojukwu (born 28 November 2005) is an Austrian footballer who plays as a midfielder for SC Freiburg. Previously Ojukwu played for First Vienna FC.

== International career ==
Ojukwu has represented Austria at the youth level.
