= Roosa Ariyo =

Nigerian footballer (born 1994)

Personal information
- Full name: Roosa Funmilayo Ariyo
- Date of birth: 13 June 1994 (age 32)
- Place of birth: Kirkkonummi, Finland
- Height: 1.73 m (5 ft 8 in)
- Position: Forward

Team information
- Current team: Club YLA
- Number: 20

College career
Years	Team	Apps	(Gls)
2017–2018	Monroe Tribunes	31	(79)
2019	Bridgeport Purple Knights	18	(3)

Senior career*
Years	Team	Apps	(Gls)
2011–2014	Honka	44	(4)
2015–2017	Jitex	50	(27)
2019–2021	TiPS	25	(21)
2021–2022	UDG Tenerife	9	(0)
2022	Real Betis	0	(0)
2022–2023	Club YLA	26	(9)
2023–	KuPS	15	(10)

International career^{‡}
2012	Finland U20	1	(0)
2021–	Nigeria	1	(0)
- * Club domestic league appearances and goals as of 16 July 2023 ‡ National team caps and goals as of 16 June 2021.

Roosa Funmilayo Ariyo (born 13 June 1994) is a Finnish-born Nigerian professional footballer who plays as a forward for KuPS and the Nigeria women's national team.

== Early life ==
Ariyo was raised in Helsinki and Espoo. Her father is Yoruba from Kogi State, Nigeria, and her mother is Finnish. She holds both Finnish and Nigerian citizenship.

== College career ==
Ariyo has attended the Monroe Community College and the University of Bridgeport in the United States.

== Club career ==
=== Honka ===
Ariyo made her league debut against United Pietarsaari on 9 July 2011. She scored her first league goal against Åland United on 14 August 2013, scoring in the 88th minute.

=== Jitex ===
Ariyo made her league debut against QBIK on 12 April 2015.

=== TiPS ===
Ariyo made her league debut against Åland United on 23 March 2019. She scored her first league goals against IK Myran on 20 April 2019, scoring in the 18th and 34th minute.

=== UDG Tenerife ===
On 30 June 2021, Ariyo was announced at UDG Tenerife. She made her league debut against Barcelona on 4 September 2021.

=== Real Betis ===
Ariyo was announced at Real Betis.

=== Club YLA ===
On 30 June 2022, Ariyo was announced at Club YLA.

=== KuPS ===
On 4 August 2023, Ariyo was announced at KuPS. She made her league debut against HJK on 8 August 2023. Ariyo scored her first league goal against Åland United on 12 August 2023, scoring in the 62nd minute. She won the August 2023 Best Player award in September 2023. Ariyo scored against Celtic on 4 September 2024 in the UEFA Women's Champions League, scoring in the 18th minute.

== International career ==
Ariyo made her senior debut for Nigeria on 10 June 2021 in a 0–1 friendly loss to Jamaica.
