= Rojin Polat =

Australian-Turkish women's footballer

Personal information
- Date of birth: 20 August 2004 (age 22)
- Place of birth: Sydney, New South Wales, Australia
- Position: Midfielder

Team information
- Current team: Sydney Uni SFC

Youth career
- 2018–2022: SD Raiders FC

College career
Years	Team	Apps	(Gls)
2023–	Sydney Uni SFC	17	(2)

International career^{‡}
2022–2023	Turkey U-19	7	(2)
2023–	Turkey	1	(0)
- ‡ National team caps and goals as of 27 October 2023

Rojin Polat (born 20 August 2004) is an Australian-born Turkish footballer, who plays as a midfielder for Sydney Uni SFC in the NSW League Two, and the Turkey women's national team. She was a member of the Turkey women's U-19 team. She also plays futsal for SD Raiders Futsal.

== Club career ==
=== SD Raiders FC ===
Polat started her football career at SD Raiders FC in Moorebank, New South Wales. In 2018, she played 23 matches and scored five goals in the U14 team. In 2020, she appeared with the U17 team in 21 games scoring one goal in three different competitions in total. The next year, she scored two goals in twelve matches in the National Premier Leagues 2 NSW Women's. That year, she was named member of the 2021 All Schools Merit Girls Team in New South Wales. In 2022, she played in the Open Girls NSW Combined Independent Schools team at the NSW All Schools Football Championships.

=== Sydney Uni SFC ===
In the 2023 season, Polat joined Sydney Uni SFC in the National Premier Leagues NSW Women's. That season, she scored two goals in 17 league matches.

== Futsal ==
Polat also plays futsal as a member of the team SD Raiders Futsal in the Futsal Premier League 2 Open Women's.

== International career ==
=== Turkey U-19 ===
In 2022, Polat became a member of the Turkey women's U-19 team, and debuted in the friendly match against Azerbaijan on 14 September 2022. She played in five matches of the 2023 UEFA Women's Under-19 Championship qualification, and scored two goals.

=== Turkey ===
Polat was admitted to the Turkey women's national team, and played her first match against Luxembourg on 27 October 2023.

== Personal life ==
Rojin Polat was born to Kurdish parents from Turkey in Sydney, New South Wales, Australia, on 20 August 2004.

She is a student at Sydney University.
