= Antonia Bratu =

Romanian footballer (born 2004)

Personal information
- Date of birth: 7 October 2004 (age 22)
- Place of birth: Cluj-Napoca
- Position: Defender

Team information
- Current team: Politehnica Timisoara

International career^{‡}
Years	Team	Apps	(Gls)
2019	Romania U17	6	(0)
2020–	Romania	2	(0)
- ‡ National team caps and goals as of 13:37, 31 January 2021 (UTC)

Antonia Bratu (born 7 October 2004) is a Romanian footballer who plays as a defender for Olimpia Cluj and the Romania women's national team.

== Career ==
She made her debut for the Romania national team on 23 October 2020 against Lithuania, coming on as a substitute for Andrea Herczeg. Olimpia Cluj, Sassuolo
