= 2022 UEFA Women's Under-19 Championship qualification =

Tournament details
- Dates: Round 1: 15 September – 26 October 2021; Round 2: 5 April – 16 May 2022
- Teams: 52 (from 1 confederation)

Tournament statistics
- Matches played: 151
- Goals scored: 524 (3.47 per match)
- Top scorer: (Bosnia and Herzegovina) Maja Jelčić (7 goals)

The 2022 UEFA Women's Under-19 Championship qualifying competition was a women's under-19 football competition that determined the seven teams joining the automatically qualified hosts the Czech Republic in the 2022 UEFA Women's Under-19 Championship final tournament.

A record 52 teams, including hosts the Czech Republic, entered the qualifying competition. Players born on or after 1 January 2003 were eligible to participate.

== Format ==
From this season, UEFA implemented a new format for the women's U17 and U19 Euros, based on a league-style qualifying format.

The teams are divided into two leagues: League A and League B. In this first season of the new system, the teams were divided using coefficient rankings.

Each league will play two rounds:

- Round 1: In each league, groups of 4 teams will play mini-tournaments in a single round-robin format. The six winners of each mini-tournament in league B and the best runner-up will be promoted and the seven last-placed teams in league A mini-tournaments will be relegated.
- Round 2: The seven winners of League A will qualify for the final tournament. The six winners of mini-tournaments in league B and the best runner-up will be promoted and the last-placed teams in league A will be relegated for Round 1 of the next edition of the tournament.

=== Tiebreakers ===
For rounds 1 and 2, teams were ranked according to points (3 points for a win, 1 point for a draw, 0 points for a loss), and if tied on points, the following tiebreaking criteria were to be applied, in the order given, to determine the rankings (Regulations Articles 14.01 and 14.02):

1. higher number of points obtained in the matches played among the teams in question;
2. Goal difference in head-to-head matches among tied teams;
3. Goals scored in head-to-head matches among tied teams;
4. If more than two teams were tied, and after applying all head-to-head criteria above, a subset of teams were still tied, all head-to-head criteria above were reapplied exclusively to this subset of teams;
5. Goal difference in all group matches;
6. Goals scored in all group matches;
7. Higher position in the applicable ranking:
- for teams in round 1, position in the coefficient rankings;
- for teams in round 2, position in the round 1 league ranking.

== Round 1 ==
=== Draw ===
The draw for the qualifying round was held on 11 March 2021, 15:00 CET (UTC+1), at the UEFA headquarters in Nyon, Switzerland.

The teams were seeded according to their coefficient ranking, calculated based on the following :

- 2015 UEFA Women's Under-19 Championship final tournament and qualifying competition (qualifying round and elite round)
- 2016 UEFA Women's Under-19 Championship final tournament and qualifying competition (qualifying round and elite round)
- 2017 UEFA Women's Under-19 Championship final tournament and qualifying competition (qualifying round and elite round)
- 2018 UEFA Women's Under-19 Championship final tournament and qualifying competition (qualifying round and elite round)

Each group contained one team from Pot A, one team from Pot B, one team from Pot C, and one team from Pot D. For political reasons, Russia and Ukraine and Bosnia and Herzegovina and Kosovo would not be drawn in the same group.

The 28 first teams in the coefficient ranking qualified for League A. Teams 29–52 qualified for League B.

Teams entering League A

Pot 1
Team	Coeff	Rank
Spain	32.000	1
France	29.278	2
Germany	27.556	3
Netherlands	24.889	4
Norway	19.778	5
Switzerland	16.444	6
Denmark	16.333	7

Pot 2
Team	Coeff	Rank
England	16.167	8
Italy	15.222	9
Finland	12.833	10
Scotland	12.778	11
Belgium	12.722	12
Czech Republic	12.000	13
Sweden	12.000	14

Pot 3
Team	Coeff	Rank
Republic of Ireland	11.667	15
Austria	11.667	16
Poland	10.167	17
Hungary	10.000	18
Iceland	9.333	19
Portugal	9.167	20
Russia	9.000	21

Pot 4
Team	Coeff	Rank
Serbia	9.000	22
Slovakia	8.833	23
Slovenia	8.667	24
Northern Ireland	7.667	25
Turkey	7.500	26
Ukraine	6.500	27
Azerbaijan	6.333	28

Teams entering League B

Pot 5
Team	Coeff	Rank
Greece	6.000	29
Belarus	4.333	30
Wales	4.167	31
Israel	3.500	32
Bosnia and Herzegovina	3.333	33
Croatia	3.333	34

Pot 6
Team	Coeff	Rank
Romania	3.000	35
Bulgaria	2.667	36
Albania	2.333	37
Montenegro	2.000	38
Faroe Islands	2.000	39
Kosovo	1.667	40

Pot 7
Team	Coeff	Rank
Latvia	1.333	41
Lithuania	1.000	42
North Macedonia	1.000	43
Moldova	1.000	44
Georgia	0.333	45
Estonia	0.333	46

Pot 8
Team	Coeff	Rank
Malta	0.333	47
Cyprus	0.000	48
Kazakhstan	0.000	49
Armenia	0.000	50
Liechtenstein	0.000	51
Andorra	NC	52

=== League A ===
Times are CEST (UTC+2), as listed by UEFA (local times, if different, are in parentheses).

==== Group A1 ====
Pos	Team	Pld	W	D	L	GF	GA	GD	Pts	Promotion
1	Austria	3	3	0	0	3	0	+3	9	Transfer to Round 2 (League A)
2	Netherlands (H)	3	2	0	1	7	2	+5	6	Transfer to Round 2 (League A)
3	Ukraine	3	0	1	2	2	6	−4	1	Transfer to Round 2 (League A)
4	Scotland	3	0	1	2	1	5	−4	1	Relegated to Round 2 (League B)

First match(es) will be played: 20 October 2021. Source: UEFA
(H) Hosts
20 October 2021
16:00

Austria	1–0	Scotland
Magerl 45+1'	Report

Sportpark de Bosk, Harkema
Referee: Zuzana Valentová (Slovakia)
20 October 2021
19:00

Netherlands	4–1	Ukraine
Snellenberg 43', 54'; Paliama 64'; van Dijk 84'	Report	Kotyk 45+1'

Sportpark Marsdijk, Assen
Referee: Ioanna Allayiotou (Cyprus)

23 October 2021
16:00

Scotland	1–1	Ukraine
Adams 50'	Report	Khrystiuk 90'

Sportpark Marsdijk, Assen
Referee: Zuzana Valentová (Slovakia)
23 October 2021
19:00

Netherlands	0–1	Austria
	Report	Sarac 69'

Sportpark de Bosk, Harkema
Referee: Eszter Urban (Hungary)

26 October 2021
19:00

Ukraine	0–1	Austria
	Report	Sarac 79'

Sportpark de Bosk, Harkema
Referee: Ioanna Allayiotoi (Cyprus)
26 October 2021
19:00

Scotland	0–3	Netherlands
	Report	Koeleman 41', 71'; Noordman 47'

Sportpark Marsdijk, Assen
Referee: Eszter Urban (Hungary)

==== Group A2 ====
Pos	Team	Pld	W	D	L	GF	GA	GD	Pts	Promotion
1	France	3	3	0	0	5	0	+5	9	Transfer to Round 2 (League A)
2	Sweden	3	2	0	1	6	2	+4	6	Transfer to Round 2 (League A)
3	Iceland	3	1	0	2	3	4	−1	3	Transfer to Round 2 (League A)
4	Serbia (H)	3	0	0	3	0	8	−8	0	Relegated to Round 2 (League B)

Source: UEFA
(H) Hosts
15 September 2021
13:00

Iceland	1–2	Sweden
Kristinsdóttir 20'	Report	Reidy 45+1'; Renberg 90'

Sports Center of FA of Serbia - pitch 1, Stara Pazova
Referee: Olivia Tschon (Austria)
15 September 2021
19:00

France	2–0	Serbia
Hoeltzel 32'; Becho 36'	Report

Sports Center of FA of Serbia - pitch 1, Stara Pazova
Referee: Veronika Kovarova (Czech Republic)

18 September 2021
13:00

France	2–0	Iceland
Ribadeira 36', 48'	Report

Sports Center of FA of Serbia - pitch 1, Stara Pazova
Referee: Galiya Echeva (Bulgaria)
18 September 2021
19:00

Sweden	4–0	Serbia
Akgün 38'; Čavić 45' (o.g.); Kafaji 47'; Björk 85'	Report

Sports Center of FA of Serbia - pitch 1, Stara Pazova
Referee: Olivia Tschon (Austria)

21 September 2021
13:00

Serbia	0–2	Iceland
	Report	Benediktsdóttir 64'; Þorvarðardóttir 90+1'

Sports Center of FA of Serbia - pitch 1, Stara Pazova
Referee: Veronika Kovarova (Czech Republic)
21 September 2021
19:00

Sweden	0–1	France
	Report	Mouchon 31'

Sports Center of FA of Serbia - pitch 1, Stara Pazova
Referee: Galiya Echeva (Bulgaria)

==== Group A3 ====
Pos	Team	Pld	W	D	L	GF	GA	GD	Pts	Promotion
1	Germany	3	2	1	0	8	2	+6	7	Transfer to Round 2 (League A)
2	Belgium	3	2	0	1	7	2	+5	6	Transfer to Round 2 (League A)
3	Russia (H)	3	1	1	1	2	2	0	4	Transfer to Round 2 (League A)
4	Slovenia	3	0	0	3	2	13	−11	0	Relegated to Round 2 (League B)

Source: UEFA
(H) Hosts
15 September 2021
11:00 (12:00 MKS)

Germany	6–1	Slovenia
Wamser 3'; Büchele 21'; Sternad 34', 77'; Gräwe 48'; Zicai 65'	Report	Brumen 8'

VGAFK, Volgograd
Referee: Maria Sole Caputi (Italy)
15 September 2021
17:00 (18:00 MKS)

Russia	0–1	Belgium
	Report	Boutiebi 88'

VGAFK, Volgograd
Referee: Ana Maria Alexandra Terteleac (Romania)

18 September 2021
11:00 (12:00 MKS)

Germany	0–0	Russia
	Report

VGAFK, Volgograd
Referee: Jelena Pejković (Croatia)
18 September 2021
17:00 (18:00 MKS)

Belgium	5–0	Slovenia
Vanzeir 2'; Jacobs 17'; Detruyer 33'; Meeuwis 43'; Van Belle 46'	Report

VGAFK, Volgograd
Referee: Ana Maria Alexandra Terteleac (Romania)

21 September 2021
11:00 (12:00 MKS)

Slovenia	1–2	Russia
Erman 90+5'	Report	Oleksyuk 69'; Trofimova 90+2' (pen.)

VGAFK, Volgograd
Referee: Maria Sole Caputi (Italy)
21 September 2021
11:00 (12:00 MKS)

Belgium	1–2	Germany
Boutiebi 33'	Report	Wamser 7'; Zicai 25'

VGAFK, Volgograd
Referee: Jelena Pejković (Croatia)

==== Group A4 ====
Pos	Team	Pld	W	D	L	GF	GA	GD	Pts	Promotion
1	Denmark (H)	3	3	0	0	11	1	+10	9	Transfer to Round 2 (League A)
2	Finland	3	2	0	1	8	2	+6	6	Transfer to Round 2 (League A)
3	Hungary	3	1	0	2	3	5	−2	3	Transfer to Round 2 (League A)
4	Turkey	3	0	0	3	0	14	−14	0	Relegated to Round 2 (League B)

Updated to match(es) played on 26 October 2021. Source: UEFA
(H) Hosts
20 October 2021
14:00

Hungary	0–2	Finland
	Report	Kránitz 45+1' (o.g.); Tőrők 67' (o.g.)

Hvidovre Stadium, Hvidovre
Referee: Eleni Antoniou (Greece)
20 October 2021
18:00

Denmark	6–0	Turkey
Dudek 36'; Thygesen 45+3'; Rylov 52' (pen.); Veletanlic 54'; Berthelsen 90+3', 90+7'	Report

Østerbro Stadium, Copenhagen
Referee: Stacey Pearson (England)

23 October 2021
14:00

Denmark	3–0	Hungary
Knudsen 5'; Bokor 8' (o.g.); Dudek 74'	Report

Hvidovre Stadium, Hvidovre
Referee: Lucie Šulcová (Czech Republic)
23 October 2021
18:00

Finland	5–0	Turkey
Forsblom 5' (pen.); Lindström 25', 90+7'; Koivu 66'; Määttä 90+4'	Report

Tingbjerg Idrætspark, Brønshøj
Referee: Eleni Antoniou (Greece)

26 October 2021
14:00

Turkey	0–3	Hungary
	Report	Árvay 32'; Sali 65'; Kiss-Lantos 90+3'

Østerbro Stadium, Copenhagen
Referee: Stacey Pearson (England)
26 October 2021
14:00

Finland	1–2	Denmark
Sarjanoja 34'	Report	Knudsen 48', 71'

Hvidovre Stadium, Hvidovre
Referee: Lucie Šulcová (Czech Republic)

==== Group A5 ====
Pos	Team	Pld	W	D	L	GF	GA	GD	Pts	Promotion
1	England	3	3	0	0	10	1	+9	9	Transfer to Round 2 (League A)
2	Switzerland	3	2	0	1	6	4	+2	6	Transfer to Round 2 (League A)
3	Republic of Ireland (H)	3	1	0	2	4	4	0	3	Transfer to Round 2 (League A)
4	Northern Ireland	3	0	0	3	2	13	−11	0	Relegated to Round 2 (League B)

Source: UEFA
(H) Hosts
20 October 2021
15:00 (14:00 IST)

Switzerland	3–1	Northern Ireland
Li Puma 32', 83'; Csillag 70'	Report	Chambers 14'

Jackman Park, Limerick
Referee: Marina Živković (Serbia)
20 October 2021
20:00 (19:00 IST)

Republic of Ireland	0–1	England
	Report	Brennan 79' (o.g.)

Markets Field, Limerick
Referee: Zulema González González (Spain)

23 October 2021
15:00 (14:00 IST)

England	8–1	Northern Ireland
Clinton 6', 67', 90+2'; Goodwin 30'; Gregory 49' (pen.); Parry 75', 82'; Beever-Jones 88'	Report	Dickson 44'

Jackman Park, Limerick
Referee: Zulema González González (Spain)
23 October 2021
20:00 (19:00 IST)

Switzerland	3–2	Republic of Ireland
Bucci 10' (o.g.); Pilgrim 14'; Csillag 24'	Report	Bucci 26'; Molloy 77'

Markets Field, Limerick
Referee: Sabina Bolic (Croatia)

26 October 2021
14:00 (13:00 IST)

Northern Ireland	0–2	Republic of Ireland
	Report	Molloy 34'; Stapleton 63' (pen.)

Markets Field, Limerick
Referee: Marina Živković (Serbia)
26 October 2021
14:00 (13:00 IST)

England	1–0	Switzerland
Clinton 78'	Report

Jackman Park, Limerick
Referee: Sabina Bolic (Croatia)

==== Group A6 ====
Pos	Team	Pld	W	D	L	GF	GA	GD	Pts	Promotion
1	Spain	3	3	0	0	10	1	+9	9	Transfer to Round 2 (League A)
2	Czech Republic	3	2	0	1	5	5	0	6	Transfer to Round 2 (League A)
3	Portugal (H)	3	1	0	2	5	8	−3	3	Transfer to Round 2 (League A)
4	Slovakia	3	0	0	3	3	9	−6	0	Relegated to Round 2 (League B)

Source: UEFA
(H) Hosts
19 October 2021
17:00 (16:00 WEST)

Spain	3–0	Slovakia
Fiamma 26'; Lloris 35'; Delgado Martín 90+1'	Report

Albufeira Municipal Stadium, Albufeira
Referee: Michéle Schmölzer (Switzerland)
19 October 2021
17:00 (16:00 WEST)

Portugal	1–2	Czech Republic
Caniço 60'	Report	Střížová 73', 90'

Estádio Algarve, Faro/Loulé
Referee: Kateryna Usova (Ukraine)

22 October 2021
17:00 (16:00 WEST)

Czech Republic	2–1	Slovakia
Ducháčková 47'; Kochanová 74'	Report	Retkesová 66'

Estádio Algarve, Faro/Loulé
Referee: Kateryna Usova (Ukraine)
22 October 2021
17:00 (16:00 WEST)

Spain	4–0	Portugal
Lloris 2'; Pinedo 31'; Uria 34'; Medina 41'	Report

Albufeira Municipal Stadium, Albufeira
Referee: Karoline Wacker (Germany)

25 October 2021
17:00 (16:00 WEST)

Slovakia	2–4	Portugal
Hrdličková 69' (pen.); Mak 75'	Report	Alagoa 22' (pen.), 65'; Negrão 28' (pen.); Caniço 39'

Estádio Algarve, Faro/Loulé
Referee: Michéle Schmölzer (Switzerland)
25 October 2021
17:00 (16:00 WEST)

Czech Republic	1–3	Spain
Pavlíčková 48'	Report	Uria 11', 18', 49'

Albufeira Municipal Stadium, Albufeira
Referee: Karoline Wacker (Germany)

==== Group A7 ====
Pos	Team	Pld	W	D	L	GF	GA	GD	Pts	Promotion
1	Italy (H)	3	2	1	0	14	1	+13	7	Transfer to Round 2 (League A)
2	Norway	3	2	1	0	11	2	+9	7	Transfer to Round 2 (League A)
3	Poland	3	1	0	2	3	7	−4	3	Transfer to Round 2 (League A)
4	Azerbaijan	3	0	0	3	0	18	−18	0	Relegated to Round 2 (League B)

Updated to match(es) played on 26 October 2021. Source: UEFA
(H) Hosts
20 October 2021
12:00

Norway	7–0	Azerbaijan
Brønstad 1', 26' (pen.); Tandberg 35'; Svandal 74', 80'; Jorde 78'; Omarsdottir 83' (pen.)	Report

Campo Comunale Maserà, Padua
Referee: Louise Thompson (Northern Ireland)
20 October 2021
15:00

Poland	0–4	Italy
	Report	Arcangeli 27'; Giai 45+1'; Beccari 90+2', 90+3'

Stadio di Monteortone, Abano Terme
Referee: Teresa Pimenta (Portugal)

23 October 2021
14:00

Italy	9–0	Azerbaijan
Pfattner 11', 26', 35'; Arcangeli 28'; Larenza 32'; Corelli 47', 90+2' (pen.); Cochis 78'; Beccari 82'	Report

Stadio Comunale di Caldiero, Caldiero
Referee: Teresa Pimenta (Portugal)
23 October 2021
15:00

Norway	3–1	Poland
Omarsdottir 12'; Kyvag 61'; Sørbo 87'	Report	Krezyman 63'

Stadio di Monteortone, Abano Terme
Referee: Jelena Cvetković (Serbia)

26 October 2021
15:00

Azerbaijan	0–2	Poland
	Report	Bieszczad 50'; Skupień 90+1'

Campo Comunale Maserà, Padua
Referee: Louise Thompson (Northern Ireland)
26 October 2021
15:00

Italy	1–1	Norway
Arcangeli 4'	Report	Omarsdottir 56'

Stadio di Monteortone, Abano Terme
Referee: Jelena Cvetković (Serbia)

=== League B ===
==== Group B1 ====
Pos	Team	Pld	W	D	L	GF	GA	GD	Pts	Promotion
1	Belarus (H)	3	3	0	0	14	1	+13	9	Promotion to Round 2 (League A)
2	North Macedonia	3	2	0	1	8	5	+3	6	Transfer to Round 2 (League B)
3	Faroe Islands	3	1	0	2	2	8	−6	3	Transfer to Round 2 (League B)
4	Cyprus	3	0	0	3	2	12	−10	0	Transfer to Round 2 (League B)

Updated to match(es) played on 26 October 2021. Source: UEFA
(H) Hosts
20 October 2021
12:00 (13:00 MSK)

Belarus	6–0	Cyprus
Surovtseva 4', 89'; Pobegaylo 10'; Asmykovich 35' (pen.), 90+1'; Bakum 42'	Report

Spartak Stadium, Mogilev
Referee: Jelena Jermolajeva (Latvia)
20 October 2021
18:00 (19:00 MSK)

North Macedonia	3–0	Faroe Islands
Nikolovska 33'; Bozhinoska 74'; Mojsoska 87' (pen.)	Report

Spartak Stadium, Mogilev
Referee: Michalina Diakow (Poland)

23 October 2021
12:00 (13:00 MSK)

Faroe Islands	2–0	Cyprus
Á Dalinum 61'; Olsen 72'	Report

Spartak Stadium, Mogilev
Referee: Michalina Diakow (Poland)
23 October 2021
18:00 (19:00 MSK)

Belarus	3–1	North Macedonia
Asmykovich 14' (pen.); Yakusik 58'; Kapysha 87'	Report	Nikolovska 60'

Spartak Stadium, Mogilev
Referee: Vera Opeykina (Russia)

26 October 2021
13:00 (14:00 MSK)

Cyprus	2–4	North Macedonia
Kyriakidi 21'; Zamani 24'	Report	Nikolovska 35'; Nedeva 55', 79' (pen.); Cokleska 90'

Spartak Stadium, Shklow
Referee: Jelena Jermolajeva (Latvia)
26 October 2021
13:00 (14:00 MSK)

Faroe Islands	0–5	Belarus
	Report	Bakum 7', 12', 27'; Pobegaylo 69'; Petersen 85' (o.g.)

Spartak Stadium, Mogilev
Referee: Vera Opeykina (Russia)

==== Group B2 ====
Pos	Team	Pld	W	D	L	GF	GA	GD	Pts	Promotion
1	Bulgaria (H)	3	3	0	0	10	1	+9	9	Promotion to Round 2 (League A)
2	Greece	3	2	0	1	12	3	+9	6	Promotion to Round 2 (League A)
3	Lithuania	3	1	0	2	3	10	−7	3	Transfer to Round 2 (League B)
4	Kazakhstan	3	0	0	3	0	11	−11	0	Transfer to Round 2 (League B)

Source: UEFA
(H) Hosts
20 October 2021
13:30 (14:30 MSK))

Lithuania	1–5	Bulgaria
Dockaitė 90+1'	Report	V. Ivanova 27', 30'; Yordanova 65'; D. Ivanova 67'; N. Ivanova 69'

Albena 1, Albena
Referee: Neslihan Muratdağı (Turkey)
20 October 2021
13:30 (14:30 MSK))

Greece	7–0	Kazakhstan
Gkouni Papaioannou 2', 77'; Baxevanou 4'; Papatheodorou 17'; Markoutsa 55'; Zotou 90+3'; Giannaka 90+5'	Report

Druzhba, Drobich
Referee: Sofik Torosyan (Armenia

23 October 2021
13:30 (14:30 MSK))

Bulgaria	3–0	Kazakhstan
Dimitrova 4'; D. Ivanova 26'; N. Ivanova 64'	Report

Albena 1, Albena
Referee: Neslihan Muratdağı (Turkey)
23 October 2021
13:30 (14:30 MSK))

Greece	5–1	Lithuania
Plakia 17'; Giannaka 20'; Kalesi 24', 45+2'; Gkouni Papaioannou 77'	Report	Proscevičiūtė 66'

Druzhba, Drobich
Referee: Catarina Campos (Portugal)

26 October 2021
13:30 (14:30 MSK))

Kazakhstan	0–1	Lithuania
	Report	Proscevičiūtė 90+1'

Druzhba, Drobich
Referee: Sofik Torosyan (Armenia
26 October 2021
13:30 (14:30 MSK))

Bulgaria	2–0	Greece
D. Ivanova 54'; N. Ivanova 60'	Report

Albena 1, Albena
Referee: Catarina Campos (Portugal)

==== Group B3 ====
Pos	Team	Pld	W	D	L	GF	GA	GD	Pts	Promotion
1	Wales	3	3	0	0	11	1	+10	9	Promotion to Round 2 (League A)
2	Albania	3	1	1	1	2	4	−2	4	Transfer to Round 2 (League B)
3	Andorra (H)	3	1	0	2	1	4	−3	3	Transfer to Round 2 (League B)
4	Moldova	3	0	1	2	0	5	−5	1	Transfer to Round 2 (League B)

Source: UEFA
(H) Hosts
19 October 2021
12:00

Moldova	0–0	Albania
	Report

Centre d'Entrenament FAF, Andorra la Vella
Referee: Andromachi Tsiofliki (Greece)
19 October 2021
16:00

Wales	3–0	Andorra
Hilliard 22', 39'; McAteer 50' (pen.)	Report

Estadi Nacional, Andorra la Vella
Referee: Tanja Racic (Bosnia and Herzegovina)

22 October 2021
12:00

Wales	4–0	Moldova
Hilliard 14'; Poole 67', 90+2'; McAteer 69'	Report

Centre d'Entrenament FAF, Andorra la Vella
Referee: Reelika Turi (Estonia)
22 October 2021
16:00

Albania	1–0	Andorra
Tanushi 90'	Report

Estadi Nacional, Andorra la Vella
Referee: Andromachi Tsiofliki (Greece)

25 October 2021
15:00

Andorra	1–0	Moldova
Montero 64'	Report

Estadi Nacional, Andorra la Vella
Referee: Tanja Racic (Bosnia and Herzegovina)
25 October 2021
15:00

Albania	1–4	Wales
Iliadhi 83' (pen.)	Report	Taylor 26'; Poole 44', 48', 90+10'

Centre d'Entrenament FAF, Andorra la Vella
Referee: Reelika Turi (Estonia)

==== Group B4 ====
Pos	Team	Pld	W	D	L	GF	GA	GD	Pts	Promotion
1	Romania	3	3	0	0	8	3	+5	9	Promotion to Round 2 (League A)
2	Georgia	3	1	1	1	3	3	0	4	Transfer to Round 2 (League B)
3	Israel	3	1	1	1	2	2	0	4	Transfer to Round 2 (League B)
4	Malta (H)	3	0	0	3	2	7	−5	0	Transfer to Round 2 (League B)

Updated to match(es) played on 20 October 2021. Source: UEFA
(H) Hosts
20 October 2021
11:00

Israel	1–0	Malta
Levi 60'	Report

Centenary Stadium, Ta' Qali
Referee: Emanuela Rusta (Albania)
20 October 2021
16:00

Georgia	1–2	Romania
Mtskerashvili 43'	Report	Borodi 37'; Balaceanu 60'

Centenary Stadium, Ta' Qali
Referee: Viki De Cremer (Belgium)

23 October 2021
11:00

Israel	1–1	Georgia
Sirota 33'	Report	Sulashvili 46'

Centenary Stadium, Ta' Qali
Referee: Aleksandra Česen (Slovenia)
23 October 2021
16:00

Romania	5–2	Malta
Bumbar 5'; Botojel 14' (pen.); Balaceanu 32'; Borodi 51'; Frîncu 52'	Report	Willis 45'; Camilleri 86'

Centenary Stadium, Ta' Qali
Referee: Viki De Cremer (Belgium)

26 October 2021
11:00

Malta	0–1	Georgia
	Report	Sulashvili 32'

Centenary Stadium, Ta' Qali
Referee: Emanuela Rusta (Albania)
26 October 2021
16:00

Romania	1–0	Israel
Pînzariu 20'	Report

Centenary Stadium, Ta' Qali
Referee: Aleksandra Česen (Slovenia)

==== Group B5 ====
Pos	Team	Pld	W	D	L	GF	GA	GD	Pts	Promotion
1	Croatia (H)	3	3	0	0	6	1	+5	9	Promotion to Round 2 (League A)
2	Kosovo	3	2	0	1	5	2	+3	6	Transfer to Round 2 (League B)
3	Liechtenstein	3	0	1	2	1	4	−3	1	Transfer to Round 2 (League B)
4	Latvia	3	0	1	2	1	6	−5	1	Transfer to Round 2 (League B)

Source: UEFA
(H) Hosts
19 October 2021
11:00

Latvia	0–3	Kosovo
	Report	Xhemaj 2'; Bajrami 13'; Berisha 70'

Veli Jože, Poreč
Referee: Cansu Tiryaki (Turkey)
19 October 2021
15:30

Croatia	2–0	Liechtenstein
Matanić 42'; Krznarić 50'	Report

Stadion Aldo Drosina, Pula
Referee: Irena Velevačkoska (North Macedonia)

22 October 2021
11:00

Kosovo	2–1	Liechtenstein
Berisha 5' (pen.), 65'	Report	Stampfli 16'

Veli Jože, Poreč
Referee: Cansu Tiryaki (Turkey)
22 October 2021
15:30

Croatia	3–1	Latvia
Šabašov 45+3'; Domazet 58'; Blažević 70'	Report	Poļuhoviča 30'

Stadion Aldo Drosina, Pula
Referee: María Martínez (Spain)

25 October 2021
11:00

Liechtenstein	0–0	Latvia
	Report

Veli Jože, Poreč
Referee: Irena Velevačkoska (North Macedonia)
25 October 2021
11:00

Kosovo	0–1	Croatia
	Report	Avdili 36' (o.g.)

Stadion Aldo Drosina, Pula
Referee: María Martínez (Spain)

==== Group B6 ====
Pos	Team	Pld	W	D	L	GF	GA	GD	Pts	Promotion
1	Bosnia and Herzegovina (H)	3	3	0	0	18	0	+18	9	Promotion to Round 2 (League A)
2	Montenegro	3	2	0	1	6	1	+5	6	Transfer to Round 2 (League B)
3	Estonia	3	1	0	2	6	6	0	3	Transfer to Round 2 (League B)
4	Armenia	3	0	0	3	0	23	−23	0	Transfer to Round 2 (League B)

Source: UEFA
(H) Hosts
19 October 2021
14:30

Estonia	0–2	Montenegro
	Report	Petrović 65'; Simonović 81'

Stadion Pecara, Široki Brijeg
Referee: Emilie Dokset (Norway)
19 October 2021
14:30

Bosnia and Herzegovina	13–0	Armenia
Pandžić 6'; Šabanović 8', 30'; Jelčić 11', 24', 35'; Milinković 15', 23'; Japić 47', 90+4'; Husić 54' (pen.); Huremović 60', 78'	Report

Gradski stadion, Mostar
Referee: Alexandra Ponomareva (Russia)

22 October 2021
14:30

Bosnia and Herzegovina	4–0	Estonia
Jelčić 8', 26', 31' (pen.); Smajić 63'	Report

Stadion Pecara, Široki Brijeg
Referee: Rasa Grigonė (Lithuania)
22 October 2021
14:30

Montenegro	4–0	Armenia
Simonović 26'; Petrović 28'; Ralević 30'; Bicić 36'	Report

Gradski stadion, Mostar
Referee: Emilie Dokset (Norway)

25 October 2021
14:30

Armenia	0–6	Estonia
	Report	Teern 34'; Saulus 42', 65', 73'; Hüdsi 52', 77'

Stadion Pecara, Široki Brijeg
Referee: Alexandra Ponomareva (Russia)
25 October 2021
14:30

Montenegro	0–1	Bosnia and Herzegovina
	Report	Jelčić 16'

Gradski stadion, Mostar
Referee: Rasa Grigonė (Lithuania)

==== Ranking of second-placed teams ====
Pos	Grp	Team	Pld	W	D	L	GF	GA	GD	Pts	Qualification
1	B2	Greece	3	2	0	1	12	3	+9	6	Promotion to Round 2 (League A)
2	B6	Montenegro	3	2	0	1	6	1	+5	6	
3	B1	North Macedonia	3	2	0	1	8	5	+3	6	
4	B5	Kosovo	3	2	0	1	5	2	+3	6	
5	B4	Georgia	3	1	1	1	3	3	0	4	
6	B3	Albania	3	1	1	1	2	4	−2	4	

Updated to match(es) played on 25 October 2021. Source: UEFA

== Round 2 ==
=== Draw ===
The 21 teams of Round 1 League A and the 7 teams of Round 2 League B (six group winners and the best runner-up) are drawn in seven groups of four teams. The seeding of the draw pots are determined by the following criteria (Regulations Article 15.01):

The teams were seeded according to their results in the round 1 (Regulations Article 15.01).

Teams entering League A

Pos	Grp	Team	Pld	W	D	L	GF	GA	GD	Pts	Seeding
1	A4	Denmark	3	3	0	0	11	1	+10	9	Pot A
2	A5	England	3	3	0	0	10	1	+9	9 (Note: Disciplinary points: England -2, Spain -3.)	Pot A
3	A6	Spain	3	3	0	0	10	1	+9	9	Pot A
4	A2	France	3	3	0	0	5	0	+5	9	Pot A
5	A1	Austria	3	3	0	0	3	0	+3	9	Pot A
6	A7	Italy	3	2	1	0	14	1	+13	7	Pot A
7	A3	Germany	3	2	1	0	8	2	+6	7	Pot A
8	A7	Norway	3	2	1	0	11	2	+9	7	Pot B
9	A4	Finland	3	2	0	1	8	2	+6	6	Pot B
10	A3	Belgium	3	2	0	1	7	2	+5	6 (Note: Disciplinary points: Belgium -3, Netherlands -4.)	Pot B
11	A1	Netherlands	3	2	0	1	7	2	+5	6	Pot B
12	A2	Sweden	3	2	0	1	6	2	+4	6	Pot B
13	A5	Switzerland	3	2	0	1	6	4	+2	6	Pot B
14	A6	Czech Republic	3	2	0	1	5	5	0	6	Pot B
15	A3	Russia	3	1	1	1	2	2	0	4	Pot C
16	A5	Republic of Ireland	3	1	0	2	4	4	0	3	Pot C
17	A2	Iceland	3	1	0	2	3	4	−1	3	Pot C
18	A6	Portugal	3	1	0	2	5	7	−2	3	Pot C
19	A4	Hungary	3	1	0	2	3	5	−2	3	Pot C
20	A7	Poland	3	1	0	2	3	7	−4	3	Pot C
21	A1	Ukraine	3	0	1	2	2	6	−4	1	Pot C
22	B6	Bosnia and Herzegovina	3	3	0	0	18	0	+18	9	Pot D
23	B1	Belarus	3	3	0	0	14	1	+13	9	Pot D
24	B3	Wales	3	3	0	0	11	1	+10	9	Pot D
25	B2	Bulgaria	3	3	0	0	10	1	+9	9	Pot D
26	B4	Romania	3	3	0	0	8	3	+5	9	Pot D
27	B5	Croatia	3	3	0	0	6	1	+5	9	Pot D
28	B2	Greece	3	2	0	1	12	3	+9	6	Pot D

Source: UEFA
Rules for classification: 1) round 1 position; 2) points; 3) goal difference; 4) goals scored; 5) disciplinary points; 6) coefficient.
Notes:

Teams entering League B

Pos	Grp	Team	Pld	W	D	L	GF	GA	GD	Pts	Seeding
1	A1	Scotland	3	0	1	2	1	5	−4	1	Pot A
2	A6	Slovakia	3	0	0	3	3	9	−6	0	Pot A
3	A2	Serbia	3	0	0	3	0	8	−8	0	Pot A
4	A5	Northern Ireland	3	0	0	3	2	13	−11	0 (Note: Disciplinary points: Northern Ireland -4, Slovenia -5.)	Pot A
5	A3	Slovenia	3	0	0	3	2	13	−11	0	Pot A
6	A4	Turkey	3	0	0	3	0	14	−14	0	Pot A
7	A7	Azerbaijan	3	0	0	3	0	18	−18	0	Pot B
8	B6	Montenegro	3	2	0	1	6	1	+5	6	Pot B
9	B1	North Macedonia	3	2	0	1	8	5	+3	6	Pot B
10	B5	Kosovo	3	2	0	1	5	2	+3	6	Pot B
11	B4	Georgia	3	1	1	1	3	3	0	4	Pot B
12	B3	Albania	3	1	1	1	2	4	−2	4	Pot B
13	B4	Israel	3	1	1	1	2	2	0	4	Pot C
14	B6	Estonia	3	1	0	2	6	6	0	3	Pot C
15	B3	Andorra	3	1	0	2	1	4	−3	3	Pot C
16	B1	Faroe Islands	3	1	0	2	2	8	−6	3	Pot C
17	B2	Lithuania	3	1	0	2	3	10	−7	3	Pot C
18	B5	Liechtenstein	3	0	1	2	1	4	−3	1	Pot C
19	B5	Latvia	3	0	1	2	1	6	−5	1	Pot D
20	B3	Moldova	3	0	1	2	0	5	−5	1	Pot D
21	B4	Malta	3	0	0	3	2	7	−5	0	Pot D
22	B1	Cyprus	3	0	0	3	2	12	−10	0	Pot D
23	B2	Kazakhstan	3	0	0	3	0	11	−11	0	Pot D
24	B6	Armenia	3	0	0	3	0	23	−23	0	Pot D

Source: UEFA
Rules for classification: 1) round 1 position; 2) points; 3) goal difference; 4) goals scored; 5) disciplinary points; 6) coefficient.

=== League A ===
Times are CEST (UTC+2), as listed by UEFA (local times, if different, are in parentheses).

==== Group A1 ====
Pos	Team	Pld	W	D	L	GF	GA	GD	Pts	Promotion
1	Sweden (H)	3	3	0	0	10	2	+8	9	Qualified for the final tournament
2	Denmark	3	2	0	1	7	3	+4	6	
3	Poland	3	1	0	2	9	9	0	3	
4	Croatia	3	0	0	3	0	12	−12	0	Relegated to League B for the next tournament qualification

Source: UEFA
Rules for classification: Qualification tiebreakers
(H) Hosts
6 April 2022
13:00

Denmark	2–0	Croatia
Rhode 31'; Rylov 40'	Report

Borås Arena, Boras
Referee: Viki De Cremer (Belgium)
6 April 2022
18:30

Poland	2–4	Sweden
Buś 66'; Krezyman 80'	Report	Wangerheim 29'; Björk 31', 75'; Vinberg 50'

Borås Arena, Boras
Referee: Katalin Sipos (Hungary)

9 April 2022
13:00

Denmark	5–1	Poland
Rylov 45+3'; Knudsen 65'; Dudek 77'; Olesen 80', 82'	Report	Wróbel 8'

Borås Arena, Boras
Referee: Veronika Kovarova (Czech Republic)
9 April 2022
18:30

Sweden	4–0	Croatia
Akgün 14'; Wangerheim 60'; Jastré Högberg 78'; Rehnberg 81'	Report

Borås Arena, Boras
Referee: Katalin Sipos (Hungary)

12 April 2022
18:00

Sweden	2–0	Denmark
Rehnberg 61', 87'	Report

Borås Arena, Boras
Referee: Veronika Kovarova (Czech Republic)
12 April 2022
18:00

Croatia	0–6	Poland
	Report	Duchnowska 18'; Wróbel 54' (pen.), 90+4'; Buś 75'; Sobal 83', 85'

Hisingen Arena, Gothenburg
Referee: Viki De Cremer (Belgium)

==== Group A2 ====
Pos	Team	Pld	W	D	L	GF	GA	GD	Pts	Promotion
1	Germany (H)	1	0	1	0	1	1	0	1	Qualified for the final tournament
2	Finland	1	0	1	0	1	1	0	1	
3	Belarus	0	0	0	0	0	0	0	0	Withdrew
4	Russia	0	0	0	0	0	0	0	0	Suspended (Note: On 28 February 2022, UEFA suspended Russian clubs and national teams from all competitions.)

Source: UEFA
(H) Hosts
Notes:
12 April 2022
14:00

Finland	1–1	Germany
Sevenius 17'	Report	Keles 11'
Penalties
Forsblom (penalty scored); Sevenius (penalty missed); S. Hillberg (penalty missed); L. Hillberg (penalty missed); Juusela (penalty missed)	1–2	(penalty scored) I. Acikgöz; (penalty missed) D. Acikgöz; (penalty missed) Diehm; (penalty scored) Fröhlich

Flinger Broich, Düsseldorf
Referee: Frida Nielsen (Denmark)

==== Group A3 ====
Pos	Team	Pld	W	D	L	GF	GA	GD	Pts	Promotion
1	England (H)	3	3	0	0	8	0	+8	9	Qualified for the final tournament
2	Belgium	3	1	1	1	3	5	−2	4	
3	Wales	3	1	1	1	2	4	−2	4	
4	Iceland	3	0	0	3	1	5	−4	0	Relegated to League B for the next tournament qualification

Source: UEFA
(H) Hosts
6 April 2022
14:30

England	3–0	Wales
Ross 54'; Goodwin 57'; Watson 84'	Report

St George's Park - Pitch 4, Burton-on-Trent
Referee: Zulema Gonzalez Gonzalez (Spain)
6 April 2022
20:30

Iceland	1–2	Belgium
Kristinsdóttir 57'	Report	Vanzeir 27'; Jacobs 74'

St George's Park - Pitch 4, Burton-on-Trent
Referee: Victoria Beyer (France)

9 April 2022
14:30

England	2–0	Iceland
Beever-Jones 51'; Gregory 90+1'	Report

St George's Park - Pitch 4, Burton-on-Trent
Referee: Karoline Wacker (Germany)
9 April 2022
20:30

Belgium	1–1	Wales
Vanzeir 45+2' (pen.)	Report	Mcgowan 43'

St George's Park - Pitch 4, Burton-on-Trent
Referee: Victoria Beyer (France)

12 April 2022
14:30

Belgium	0–3	England
	Report	Beever-Jones 71', 76', 85'

St George's Park - Pitch 4, Burton-on-Trent
Referee: Karoline Wacker (Germany)
12 April 2022
14:30

Wales	1–0	Iceland
Poole 68'	Report

University Stadium, Loughborough
Referee: Zulema González González (Spain)

==== Group A4 ====
Pos	Team	Pld	W	D	L	GF	GA	GD	Pts	Promotion
1	Norway	3	3	0	0	12	0	+12	9	Qualified for the final tournament
2	Austria (H)	3	2	0	1	5	1	+4	6	
3	Ukraine	3	0	1	2	0	6	−6	1	
4	Bulgaria	3	0	1	2	0	10	−10	1	Relegated to League B for the next tournament qualification

Updated to match(es) played on 16 May 2022. Source: UEFA
(H) Hosts
10 May 2022
12:00

Ukraine	0–5	Norway
	Report	Tandberg 9'; Sørbo 18'; Isaksen 42', 77'; Fink 90+3'

Huber Arena, Wels
Attendance: 40
Referee: Katalin Sipos (Hungary)
10 May 2022
18:00

Austria	4–0	Bulgaria
Wirnsberger 45+5'; Felix 66', 69'; Kraker 70'	Report

HF Stadium, Bad Wimsbach-Neydharting
Attendance: 150
Referee: Franziska Wildfeuer (Germany)

13 May 2022
12:00

Norway	6–0	Bulgaria
Tandberg 19'; Kyvag 26'; Omarsdottir 66' (pen.), 77', 90+3'; Isaksen 89'	Report

Huber Arena, Wels
Attendance: 40
Referee: Katalin Sipos (Hungary)
13 May 2022
18:00

Austria	1–0	Ukraine
Pfanner 15'	Report

HF Stadium, Bad Wimsbach-Neydharting
Attendance: 120
Referee: Sabina Bolic (Croatia)

16 May 2022
18:00

Norway	1–0	Austria
Isaksen 56'	Report

Huber Arena, Wels
Attendance: 450
Referee: Sabina Bolic (Croatia)
16 May 2022
18:00

Bulgaria	0–0	Ukraine
	Report

HF Stadium, Bad Wimsbach-Neydharting
Attendance: 25
Referee: Franziska Wildfeuer (Germany)

==== Group A5 ====
Pos	Team	Pld	W	D	L	GF	GA	GD	Pts	Promotion
1	Italy (H)	3	3	0	0	12	2	+10	9	Qualified for the final tournament
2	Hungary	3	2	0	1	6	5	+1	6	
3	Switzerland	3	1	0	2	9	5	+4	3	
4	Bosnia and Herzegovina	3	0	0	3	1	16	−15	0	Relegated to League B for the next tournament qualification

Source: UEFA
(H) Hosts
6 April 2022
12:00

Hungary	2–1	Switzerland
Sali 2'; Lelovics 48'	Report	Li Puma 59'

Campo di Curtarolo, Curtarolo
Referee: Shona Shukrula (Netherlands)
6 April 2022
14:30

Italy	6–0	Bosnia and Herzegovina
Bertucci 21'; Ferrara 32'; Arcangeli 48', 69'; Beccari 76', 87'	Report

Stadio di Monteortone, Abano Terme
Referee: Teresa Oliveira (Portugal)

9 April 2022
12:00

Switzerland	7–0	Bosnia and Herzegovina
Potier 23', 31', 69'; R. Ueltschi 49'; Regazzoni 58'; Vallotto 60'; Schefer 79'	Report

Campo di Curtarolo, Curtarolo
Referee: Shona Shukrula (Netherlands)
9 April 2022
14:30

Italy	3–1	Hungary
Beccari 11'; Pfattner 23'; Arcangeli 87' (pen.)	Report	Németh 59'

Stadio di Monteortone, Abano Terme
Referee: Michalina Diakow (Poland)

12 April 2022
14:30

Switzerland	1–3	Italy
Vallotto 62'	Report	Pfattner 10', 25'; Arcangeli 14'

Stadio Comunale Euganeo, Padova
Referee: Michalina Diakow (Poland)
12 April 2022
14:30

Bosnia and Herzegovina	1–3	Hungary
Smajić 70'	Report	Siber 6', 44'; Nagy 50' (pen.)

Stadio di Monteortone, Abano Terme
Referee: Teresa Oliveira (Portugal)

==== Group A6 ====
Pos	Team	Pld	W	D	L	GF	GA	GD	Pts	Promotion
1	Spain	3	2	1	0	17	2	+15	7	Qualified for the final tournament
2	Netherlands	3	2	1	0	9	2	+7	7	
3	Portugal (H)	3	1	0	2	3	9	−6	3	
4	Romania	3	0	0	3	1	17	−16	0	Relegated to League B for the next tournament qualification

Source: UEFA
(H) Hosts
6 April 2022
17:00

Spain	9–0	Romania
Lloris 29'; Fiamma 40' (pen.), 63', 72', 90+4'; Uria 47'; Baradad 84'; Álvarez 85'; Paralluelo 90'	Report

Sports Center CF Fão, Fão
Referee: Miriama Matulova (Slovakia)
6 April 2022
17:00

Portugal	0–2	Netherlands
	Report	Henry 38'; van Straten 90+3'

Cidade Desportiva do SC Braga, Braga
Referee: Maria Marotta (Italy)

9 April 2022
17:00

Spain	6–0	Portugal
Rodrigues 5' (o.g.); Bartel 43'; Álvarez 45', 63', 66'; Mingueza 52'	Report

Sports Center CF Fão, Fão
Referee: Abigail Marriott (England)
9 April 2022
17:00

Netherlands	5–0	Romania
Noordman 50'; Henry 60'; Hulst 65', 86'; Van Gool 90+1'	Report

Estádio Municipal de Fafe, Fafe
Referee: Maria Marotta (Italy)

12 April 2022
17:00

Netherlands	2–2	Spain
Henry 70'; Gallego 86' (o.g.)	Report	Valle 15'; Baradad 88'

Estádio Municipal de Famalicão, Vila Nova de Famalicão
Referee: Abigail Marriott (England)
12 April 2022
17:00

Romania	1–3	Portugal
Bălăceanu 20'	Report	Leonor 47'; Ribeiro 62'; Miller 86'

Cidade Desportiva do SC Braga, Braga
Referee: Miriama Matulova (Slovakia)

==== Group A7 ====
Pos	Team	Pld	W	D	L	GF	GA	GD	Pts	Promotion
1	France	3	3	0	0	11	1	+10	9	Qualified for the final tournament
2	Republic of Ireland	3	2	0	1	3	3	0	6	
3	Greece	3	1	0	2	3	5	−2	3	
4	Czech Republic (H)	3	0	0	3	2	10	−8	0	Relegated to League B for the next tournament qualification

Source: UEFA
(H) Hosts
6 April 2022
15:00

France	3–0	Greece
Blanc 13'; Fontaine 53'; Traore 90'	Report

Bazaly, Ostrava
Referee: Araksya Saribekyan (Armenia)
6 April 2022
18:00

Republic of Ireland	2–0	Czech Republic
Doherty 49', 90+4'	Report

Mestský fotbalovy, Opava
Referee: Catarina Campos (Portugal)

9 April 2022
15:00

France	3–0	Republic of Ireland
Traore 11'; Becho 47' (pen.); Nassi 75'	Report

Bazaly, Ostrava
Referee: Alina Peşu (Romania)
9 April 2022
15:00

Czech Republic	1–3	Greece
Dinh Thanhová 12'	Report	Zotou 58'; Papatheodorou 82'; Baxevanou 85'

Mestský fotbalovy, Opava
Referee: Catarina Campos (Portugal)

12 April 2022
15:00

Czech Republic	1–5	France
Pavlíčková 8'	Report	Ribadeira 16', 34'; Nassi 45+1'; Haugou 76', 88'

Stovky, Frýdek-Místek
Referee: Alina Peşu (Romania)
12 April 2022
15:00

Greece	0–1	Republic of Ireland
	Report	Doherty 90+4'

Bazaly, Ostrava
Referee: Araksya Saribekyan (Armenia)

=== League B ===
Times are CEST (UTC+2), as listed by UEFA (local times, if different, are in parentheses).

==== Group B1 ====
Pos	Team	Pld	W	D	L	GF	GA	GD	Pts	Promotion
1	Northern Ireland (H)	3	2	1	0	7	1	+6	7	Promoted to League A for the next tournament qualification
2	Malta	3	2	1	0	6	4	+2	7	Promoted to League A for the next tournament qualification
3	Azerbaijan	3	1	0	2	3	3	0	3	
4	Faroe Islands	3	0	0	3	2	10	−8	0	

Source: UEFA
Rules for classification: Qualification tiebreakers
(H) Hosts
6 April 2022
15:00

Faroe Islands	0–2	Azerbaijan
	Report	Muradova 20'; Safaraliyeva 41'

Inver Park, Larne
Referee: Triinu Laos (Estonia)
6 April 2022
20:30

Northern Ireland	1–1	Malta
Chambers 40'	Report	Lucia 52'

Inver Park, Larne
Referee: Tatyana Sorokopudova (Kazakhstan)

9 April 2022
15:00

Azerbaijan	1–2	Malta
Safaraliyeva 1'	Report	Willis 62'; Farrugia 69'

Inver Park, Larne
Referee: Triinu Laos (Estonia)
9 April 2022
20:30

Northern Ireland	5–0	Faroe Islands
Dickson 7'; Reilly 20', 25'; Davis 28'; Morgan 55'	Report

Inver Park, Larne
Referee: Jelena Medjedovic (Serbia)

12 April 2022
15:00

Azerbaijan	0–1	Northern Ireland
	Report	Chambers 34'

Inver Park, Larne
Referee: Jelena Medjedovic (Serbia)
12 April 2022
15:00

Malta	3–2	Faroe Islands
Falzon 65'; Samuelsen 67' (o.g.); Fenech 71'	Report	Eilersdóttir 7'; Ellingsgaard 32'

Seaview, Belfast
Referee: Tatyana Sorokopudova (Kazakhstan)

==== Group B2 ====
Pos	Team	Pld	W	D	L	GF	GA	GD	Pts	Promotion
1	Slovenia (H)	3	3	0	0	11	1	+10	9	Promoted to League A for the next tournament qualification
2	North Macedonia	3	2	0	1	4	2	+2	6	
3	Moldova	3	1	0	2	5	6	−1	3	
4	Liechtenstein	3	0	0	3	1	12	−11	0	

Source: UEFA
Rules for classification: Qualification tiebreakers
(H) Hosts
6 April 2022
17:30

Slovenia	3–1	Moldova
Eferl 13'; Šenk 25'; Gradišek 68'	Report	Colnic 48'

Brežice, Brežice
Referee: Cansu Tiryaki (Turkey)
6 April 2022
17:30

Liechtenstein	0–2	North Macedonia
	Report	Bozhinoska 37'; Milchevska 68'

Stadion Portoval Novo Mesto, Novo Mesto
Referee: Cristina Trandafir (Romania)

9 April 2022
17:30

Slovenia	7–0	Liechtenstein
Šenk 1'; Eferl 4', 13', 43'; Rovšek 30'; Bizjak 86'; Frick 90' (o.g.)	Report

Brežice, Brežice
Referee: Olivia Tschon (Austria)
9 April 2022
17:30

North Macedonia	2–1	Moldova
Chirica 4' (o.g.); Sulejmani 70'	Report	Colnic 19'

Stadion Portoval Novo Mesto, Novo Mesto
Referee: Cristina Trandafir (Romania)

12 April 2022
16:30

North Macedonia	0–1	Slovenia
	Report	Janež 22'

Stadion Portoval Novo Mesto, Novo Mesto
Referee: Olivia Tschon (Austria)
12 April 2022
16:30

Moldova	3–1	Liechtenstein
Colnic 13', 86'; Chirica 65'	Report	Hermann 20'

Brežice, Brežice
Referee: Cansu Tiryaki (Turkey)

==== Group B3 ====
Pos	Team	Pld	W	D	L	GF	GA	GD	Pts	Promotion
1	Serbia	3	3	0	0	10	0	+10	9	Promoted to League A for the next tournament qualification
2	Lithuania	3	1	1	1	1	2	−1	4	
3	Latvia (H)	3	1	1	1	1	4	−3	4	
4	Montenegro	3	0	0	3	0	6	−6	0	

Updated to match(es) played on 12 April 2022. Source: UEFA
Rules for classification: Qualification tiebreakers
(H) Hosts
6 April 2022
10:00 (11:00 EEST)

Lithuania	1–0	Montenegro
Proscevičiūtė 32'	Report

FK Jelgava training center
Referee: Michèle Schmölzer (Switzerland)
6 April 2022
15:00 (16:00 EEST)

Serbia	4–0	Latvia
Obradović 44'; Stevanović 56'; Sremčević 69'; Janković 74'	Report

FK Jelgava training center
Referee: Andromachi Tsiofliki (Greece)

9 April 2022
10:00 (11:00 EEST)

Serbia	2–0	Lithuania
Sremčević 31'; Obradović 55'	Report

FK Jelgava training center
Referee: Minka Vekkeli (Finland)
9 April 2022
15:00 (16:00 EEST)

Montenegro	0–1	Latvia
	Report	Marković 29' (o.g.)

FK Jelgava training center
Referee: Michèle Schmölzer (Switzerland)

12 April 2022
12:00 (13:00 EEST)

Montenegro	0–4	Serbia
	Report	Ćirić 56', 90+3'; Janković 73'; Rajić 79'

Salaspils BSS stadium, Salaspils
Referee: Minka Vekkeli (Finland)
12 April 2022
12:00 (13:00 EEST)

Latvia	0–0	Lithuania
	Report

FK Jelgava training center
Referee: Andromachi Tsiofliki (Greece)

==== Group B4 ====
Pos	Team	Pld	W	D	L	GF	GA	GD	Pts	Promotion
1	Scotland (H)	3	3	0	0	13	3	+10	9	Promoted to League A for the next tournament qualification
2	Kosovo	3	2	0	1	6	5	+1	6	
3	Kazakhstan	3	1	0	2	2	5	−3	3	
4	Estonia	3	0	0	3	2	10	−8	0	

Source: UEFA
Rules for classification: Qualification tiebreakers
(H) Hosts
5 April 2022
14:00

Estonia	1–2	Kosovo
Saulus 75'	Report	Lulaj 45'; Berisha 52'

Ainslie Park, Edinburgh
Referee: Jurgita Mačikunytė (Lithuania)
5 April 2022
20:00

Scotland	3–0	Kazakhstan
Lister 38'; Hutchison 50'; Adams 76'	Report

Ainslie Park, Edinburgh

8 April 2022
14:00

Scotland	7–1	Estonia
Hutchison 20'; Staalfeldt 27' (o.g.); Anderson 47'; Thomson 62'; Lister 64'; Pollard 84'; Adams 86'	Report	Hüdsi 14'

Ainslie Park, Edinburgh
8 April 2022
20:00

Kosovo	2–1	Kazakhstan
Rama 15'; Fo. Berisha 66'	Report	Balzhan 39'

Ainslie Park, Edinburgh

11 April 2022
14:00

Kosovo	2–3	Scotland
Broadrick 9'; Kryeziu 90+2'	Report	Pollard 11'; Adams 42'; Hutchinson 90+4'

Falkirk Stadium, Falkirk
11 April 2022
14:00

Kazakhstan	1–0	Estonia
Balzhan 13'	Report

Ainslie Park, Edinburgh

==== Group B5 ====
Pos	Team	Pld	W	D	L	GF	GA	GD	Pts	Promotion
1	Slovakia	3	3	0	0	18	0	+18	9	Promoted to League A for the next tournament qualification
2	Andorra (H)	3	2	0	1	4	7	−3	6	
3	Georgia	3	1	0	2	2	5	−3	3	
4	Armenia	3	0	0	3	1	13	−12	0	

Source: UEFA
Rules for classification: Qualification tiebreakers
(H) Hosts
5 April 2022
11:00

Slovakia	8–0	Armenia
Retkesová 7'; Pelikanova 56', 59', 64'; Mazúchová 57', 79', 82'; Žihlavníková 87'	Report

Centre d’Entrenament FAF, Andorra la Vella
Referee: Merima Čelik (Bosnia and Herzegovina)
5 April 2022
15:30

Andorra	1–0	Georgia
Moles 64' (pen.)	Report

Centre d’Entrenament FAF, Andorra la Vella
Referee: Emanuela Rusta (Albania)

8 April 2022
11:00

Georgia	2–0	Armenia
Bebia 47'; Modrekiladze 55'	Report

Centre d’Entrenament FAF, Andorra la Vella
Referee: Emanuela Rusta (Albania)
8 April 2022
15:30

Slovakia	6–0	Andorra
Morávková 33'; Mazúchová 45+1'; Retkesová 58', 72'; Sin 71' (o.g.); Kovalíková 89'	Report

Centre d’Entrenament FAF, Andorra la Vella
Referee: Meitar Shemesh (Israel)

11 April 2022
12:00

Georgia	0–4	Slovakia
	Report	Kršiaková 5'; Morávková 14', 22'; Pelikanova 28'

Centre d’Entrenament FAF, Andorra la Vella
Referee: Meitar Shemesh (Israel)
11 April 2022
12:00

Armenia	1–3	Andorra
Simonyan 45+2'	Report	Moles 48' (pen.); Camin 54', 76'

Estadi Nacional, Andorra la Vella
Referee: Merima Čelik (Bosnia and Herzegovina)

==== Group B6 ====
Pos	Team	Pld	W	D	L	GF	GA	GD	Pts	Promotion
1	Israel	3	3	0	0	7	1	+6	9	Promoted to League A for the next tournament qualification
2	Turkey (H)	3	2	0	1	13	5	+8	6	
3	Albania	3	1	0	2	3	11	−8	3	
4	Cyprus	3	0	0	3	2	8	−6	0	

Source: UEFA
Rules for classification: Qualification tiebreakers
(H) Hosts
5 April 2022
11:00

Israel	2–0	Albania
Almasri 29', 41'	Report

Arslan Zeki Demirci Spor Kompleksi - Emir Hotels 2, Manavgat
Referee: Galiya Echeva (Bulgaria)
5 April 2022
14:00

Turkey	3–2	Cyprus
Kara 5', 34'; Özdemir 62'	Report	Sofocleous 7'; Rolandi 47'

Arslan Zeki Demirci Spor Kompleksi - Emir Hotels 1, Manavgat
Referee: Réka Molnar (Hungary)

8 April 2022
11:00

Albania	2–0	Cyprus
Hamonikaj 17'; Vasiliou 90' (o.g.)	Report

Arslan Zeki Demirci Spor Kompleksi - Emir Hotels 2, Manavgat
Referee: Galiya Echeva (Bulgaria)
8 April 2022
14:00

Turkey	1–2	Israel
Alayont 44'	Report	Arazi 39' (pen.); Sirota 71'

Arslan Zeki Demirci Spor Kompleksi - Emir Hotels 1, Manavgat
Referee: Viola Raudziņa (Latvia)

11 April 2022
14:00

Albania	1–9	Turkey
Armoku 9'	Report	Kerimoğlu 2', 11', 28', 55'; Içen 14', 35', 61', 90+3'; Kara 60' (pen.)

Arslan Zeki Demirci Spor Kompleksi - Emir Hotels 1, Manavgat
Referee: Viola Raudziņa (Latvia)
11 April 2022
14:00

Cyprus	0–3	Israel
	Report	Edri 56'; Almasri 65' (pen.), 72'

Arslan Zeki Demirci Spor Kompleksi - Emir Hotels 2, Manavgat
Referee: Réka Molnar (Hungary)

==== Ranking of second-placed teams ====
Pos	Grp	Team	Pld	W	D	L	GF	GA	GD	Pts	Qualification
1	B1	Malta	3	2	1	0	6	4	+2	7	Promotion to League A for the next tournament qualification
2	B6	Turkey	3	2	0	1	13	5	+8	6	
3	B2	North Macedonia	3	2	0	1	4	2	+2	6	
4	B4	Kosovo	3	2	0	1	6	5	+1	6	
5	B5	Andorra	3	2	0	1	4	7	−3	6	
6	B3	Lithuania	3	1	1	1	1	2	−1	4	

Source: UEFA
Rules for classification: 1) points; 2) goal difference; 3) goals scored; 4) disciplinary points; 5) higher position in the round 1 league ranking.

== Qualified teams ==
The following eight teams qualify for the final tournament.

Team	Qualified as	Qualified on	Previous appearances in Under-19 Euro^{1} only U-19 era (since 2002)
Czech Republic	Hosts	24 September 2019	0 (debut)
Germany	Round 2 Group A2 winners	12 April 2022	16 (**2002**, 2003, 2004, 2005, **2006**, **2007**, 2008, 2009, 2010, **2011**, 2013, 2015, 2016, 2017, 2018, 2019)
England	Round 2 Group A3 winners	12 April 2022	13 (2002, 2003, 2005, 2007, 2008, **2009**, 2010, 2012, 2013, 2014, 2015, 2017, 2019)
Sweden	Round 2 Group A1 winners	12 April 2022	9 (2002, 2003, 2006, 2008, 2009, **2012**, 2013, 2014, **2015**)
Norway	Round 2 Group A4 winners	16 May 2022	13 (2002, 2003, 2004, 2007, 2008, 2009, 2011, 2013, 2014, 2015, 2016, 2018, 2019)
Italy	Round 2 Group A5 winners	12 April 2022	7 (2003, 2004, **2008**, 2010, 2011, 2017, 2018)
Spain	Round 2 Group A6 winners	12 April 2022	14 (2002, 2003, **2004**, 2007, 2008, 2010, 2011, 2012, 2014, 2015, 2016, **2017**, **2018**, 2019)
France	Round 2 Group A7 winners	12 April 2022	15 (2002, **2003**, 2004, 2005, 2006, 2007, 2008, 2009, **2010**, **2013**, 2015, **2016**, 2017, 2018, **2019**)

^{1} Bold indicates champions for that year. Italic indicates hosts for that year.

== Goalscorers ==
In round 1 there were 264 goals scored in 78 matches, for an average of 3.38 goals per match.

In round 2 there have been 260 goals scored in 73 matches, for an average of 3.56 goals per match (as of 16 May 2022).

In total there have been 524 goals scored in 151 matches, for an average of 3.47 goals per match (as of 16 May 2022).

7 goals

- (Bosnia and Herzegovina) Maja Jelčić

6 goals

- (Italy) Nicole Arcangeli
- (Italy) Chiara Beccari

5 goals

- (Kosovo) Fortesa Berisha
- (Spain) Fiamma
- (Spain) Mirari Uria
- (Wales) Phoebie Poole

4 goals

- (Belarus) Dziyana Bakum
- (Denmark) Karen Knudsen
- (England) Grace Clinton
- (Estonia) Katriin Saulus
- (Italy) Elisa Pfattner
- (Slovakia) Lenka Mazúchová
- (Slovakia) Laura Retkesová
- (Slovenia) Anja Eferl
- (Spain) Carmen Álvarez

3 goals

- (Belgium) Luna Vanzeir
- (Belarus) Natallia Asmykovich
- (Bulgaria) Dimitra Ivanova
- (Bulgaria) Nadezhda Ivanova
- (Denmark) Nikoline Dudek
- (Denmark) Malou Rylov
- (Estonia) Kärt Hüdsi
- (Greece) Maria Gkouni Papaioannou
- (Lithuania) Meida Proscevičiūtė
- (North Macedonia) Teodora Nikolovska
- (Norway) Iris Omarsdottir
- (Scotland) Eilidh Adams
- (Slovakia) Karina Pelikanova
- (Spain) Silvia Lloris
- (Sweden) Lisa Björk
- (Switzerland) Noémie Potier
- (Switzerland) Serena Li Puma
- (Wales) Ella Hilliard

2 goals

- (Austria) Ines Gabriela Sarac
- (Azerbaijan) Parvin Safaraliyeva
- (Belarus) Anastasiya Pobegaylo
- (Belarus) Milana Surovtseva
- (Belgium) Rania Boutiebi
- (Belgium) Lore Jacobs
- (Bosnia and Herzegovina) Elma Huremović
- (Bosnia and Herzegovina) Sydney Japić
- (Bosnia and Herzegovina) Marija Milinković
- (Bosnia and Herzegovina) Vanessa Šabanović
- (Bulgaria) Vanesa Ivanova
- (Cyprus) Christina Kyriakidi
- (Cyprus) Maria Zamani
- (Czech Republic) Sabina Střížová
- (Denmark) Asii Berthelsen
- (Denmark) Karoline Olesen
- (England) Agnes Beever-Jones
- (England) Deearna Goodwin
- (England) Freya Gregory
- (England) Lucy Parry
- (Faroe Islands) Anitha Á Dalinum
- (Faroe Islands) Malena Olsen
- (Finland) Lotta Lindström
- (France) Vicki Becho
- (France) Louna Ribadeira
- (France) Manssita Traore
- (Georgia (country)) Eter Sulashvili
- (Germany) Maja Sternad
- (Germany) Carlotta Wamser
- (Germany) Cora Zicai
- (Greece) Olga Baxevanou
- (Greece) Vasiliki Giannaka
- (Greece) Nikoleta Kalesi
- (Greece) Ioanna Papatheodorou
- (Greece) Maria Zotou
- (Hungary) Rebeka Sali
- (Iceland) Ólöf Kristinsdóttir
- (Israel) Maria Almasri
- (Israel) Shani Sirota
- (Italy) Alice Corelli
- (Malta) Kailey Willis
- (Moldova) Iuliana Colnic
- (Montenegro) Jelena Petrović
- (Montenegro) Sara Simonović
- (Netherlands) Ziva Henry
- (Netherlands) Charlotte Hulst
- (Netherlands) Senna Koeleman
- (Netherlands) Danique Noordman
- (Netherlands) Maxime Snellenberg
- (North Macedonia) Tea Bozhinoska
- (North Macedonia) Viktorija Nedeva
- (Northern Ireland) Cora Chambers
- (Northern Ireland) Kathryn Dickson
- (Northern Ireland) Eve Reilly
- (Norway) Synne Brønstad
- (Poland) Nadia Krezyman
- (Portugal) Maria Alagoa
- (Portugal) Margarida Caniço
- (Republic of Ireland) Emma Doherty
- (Republic of Ireland) Ellen Molloy
- (Romania) Ioana Balaceanu
- (Romania) Adina Cristina Borodi
- (Scotland) Bayley Hutchison
- (Scotland) Leila Lister
- (Serbia) Natalija Obradović
- (Serbia) Sofija Sremčević
- (Slovenia) Laura Šenk
- (Sweden) Nesrin Akgün
- (Sweden) Ellen Wangerheim
- (Switzerland) Aurélie Csillag
- (Turkey) Beyza Kara
- (Wales) Mary McAteer

1 goal

- (Albania) Klea Hamonikaj
- (Albania) Aglia Iliadhi
- (Albania) Matilda Tanushi
- (Andorra) Maria Moles
- (Andorra) Zoe Montero
- (Austria) Julia Magerl
- (Azerbaijan) Aysun Muradova
- (Belarus) Olga Kapysha
- (Belarus) Evgeniya Yakusik
- (Belgium) Marie Detruyer
- (Belgium) Lina Meeuwis
- (Belgium) Lyndsey Van Belle
- (Bosnia and Herzegovina) Ines Husić
- (Bosnia and Herzegovina) Almasa Pandžić
- (Bosnia and Herzegovina) Elma Smajić
- (Bulgaria) Kristiyana Dimitrova
- (Bulgaria) Yana Yordanova
- (Croatia) Antonela Blažević
- (Croatia) Lucija Domazet
- (Croatia) Tea Krznarić
- (Croatia) Jelena Matanić
- (Croatia) Karla Šabašov
- (Cyprus) Lelia Rolandi
- (Cyprus) Anna Sofocleous
- (Czech Republic) Klára Ducháčková
- (Czech Republic) Andrea Kochanová
- (Czech Republic) Jaroslava Pavlíčková
- (Czech Republic) Kim Dinh Thanhová
- (Denmark) Thea Rhode
- (Denmark) Sarah Thygesen
- (Denmark) Emma Veletanlic
- (England) Mia Ross
- (England) Lucy Watson
- (Estonia) Kristina Teern
- (Finland) Wilma Forsblom
- (Finland) Ella Koivu
- (Finland) Sofia Määttä
- (Finland) Inka Sarjanoja
- (France) Cyrielle Blanc
- (France) Airine Fontaine
- (France) Mégane Hoeltzel
- (France) Noémie Mouchon
- (France) Jade Nassi
- (Georgia (country)) Maiko Bebia
- (Georgia (country)) Mariam Modrekiladze
- (Georgia (country)) Lizi Mtskerashvili
- (Germany) Mia Büchele
- (Germany) Lisanne Gräwe
- (Greece) Dimitra Markoutsa
- (Greece) Eleftheria Plakia
- (Hungary) Hanna Árvay
- (Hungary) Hanna Kiss-Lantos
- (Hungary) Nora Lelovics
- (Hungary) Diána Németh
- (Iceland) Hildigunnur Benediktsdóttir
- (Iceland) Freyja Þorvarðardóttir
- (Republic of Ireland) Emma Bucci
- (Republic of Ireland) Jessie Stapleton
- (Israel) Stav Arazi
- (Israel) Roni Levi
- (Italy) Sofia Bertucci
- (Italy) Anita Maria Cochis
- (Italy) Anastasia Ferrara
- (Italy) Rossella Larenza
- (Kazakhstan) Nursulu Balzhan
- (Kosovo) Erona Bajrami
- (Kosovo) Loreta Lulaj
- (Kosovo) Alketa Rama
- (Kosovo) Leunora Xhemaj
- (Latvia) Anastasija Poļuhoviča
- (Liechtenstein) Salomé Stampfli
- (Lithuania) Dovilė Dockaitė
- (Malta) Izabella Camilleri
- (Malta) Ileana Farrugia
- (Malta) Maya Lucia
- (Montenegro) Nejla Bicić
- (Montenegro) Jelena Ralević
- (Netherlands) Nikée van Dijk
- (Netherlands) Joni Paliama
- (Netherlands) Rosa Van Gool
- (Netherlands) Dieke van Straten
- (North Macedonia) Olivera Cokleska
- (North Macedonia) Ana Milchevska
- (North Macedonia) Kristina Mojsoska
- (North Macedonia) Lora Sulejmani
- (Northern Ireland) Shona Davis
- (Northern Ireland) Fionnuala Morgan
- (Norway) Julie Jorde
- (Norway) Thea Kyvag
- (Norway) Thea Sørbo
- (Norway) Kristina Svandal
- (Norway) Cathinka Tandberg
- (Poland) Kinga Bieszczad
- (Poland) Martyna Buś
- (Poland) Katja Skupień
- (Poland) Natalia Wróbel
- (Portugal) Maria Negrão
- (Romania) Cristina Botojel
- (Romania) Sonia Maria Bumbar
- (Romania) Elena Frîncu
- (Romania) Teodora Andreea Pînzariu
- (Russia) Ksenia Oleksyuk
- (Russia) Natalya Trofimova
- (Scotland) Aimee Anderson
- (Scotland) London Pollard
- (Scotland) Eva Thomson
- (Serbia) Jovana Janković
- (Serbia) Jana Stevanović
- (Slovakia) Pavlina Hrdličková
- (Slovakia) Frederika Kovalíková
- (Slovakia) Karen Mak
- (Slovakia) Tamara Morávková
- (Slovakia) Rebeka Žihlavníková
- (Slovenia) Gaja Bizjak
- (Slovenia) Nika Brumen
- (Slovenia) Ema Erman
- (Slovenia) Sara Gradišek
- (Slovenia) Dairine Rovšek
- (Spain) Ona Baradad
- (Spain) Júlia Bartel
- (Spain) Ainhoa Delgado
- (Spain) Andrea Medina
- (Spain) Ariadna Mingueza
- (Spain) Salma Paralluelo
- (Spain) Clara Pinedo
- (Sweden) Felicia Högberg
- (Sweden) Rasul Kafaji
- (Sweden) Sofia Reidy
- (Sweden) Svea Rehnberg
- (Sweden) Svea Renberg
- (Sweden) Matilda Vinberg
- (Switzerland) Alayah Pilgrim
- (Switzerland) Caterina Regazzoni
- (Switzerland) Siv Schefer
- (Switzerland) Rilana Ueltschi
- (Switzerland) Smilla Vallotto
- (Turkey) Mesude Alayont
- (Turkey) Rozalin Özdemir
- (Ukraine) Yuliia Khrystiuk
- (Ukraine) Yana Kotyk
- (Wales) Tegan Mcgowan
- (Wales) Jessie Taylor

1 own goal

- (Andorra) Laia Sin (against Slovakia)
- (Cyprus) Eleonora Vasiliou (against Albania)
- (Estonia) Marta Liisa Staalfeldt (against Scotland)
- (Faroe Islands) Sarita Petersen (against Belarus)
- (Hungary) Blanka Bokor (against Denmark)
- (Hungary) Viktória Kránitz (against Finland)
- (Hungary) Noémi Tőrők (against Finland)
- (Kosovo) Elmedina Avdili (against Croatia)
- (Liechtenstein) Felicia Frick (against Slovenia)
- (Moldova) Alina Chirica (against North Macedonia)
- (Montenegro) Sara Marković (against Latvia)
- (Portugal) Nelly Rodrigues (against Spain)
- (Republic of Ireland) Emma Bucci (against Switzerland)
- (Republic of Ireland) Shauna Brennan (against England)
- (Serbia) Mina Čavić (against Sweden)

Source: UEFA.com
