= Van Belle =

Van Belle (also appearing as van Belle) is a surname of Dutch origin. Notable people with the surname include:

- Brian Van Belle (born 1996), American baseball player
- Gerard van Belle (born 1968), American astronomer
- Jean-Paul Van Belle (born 1961), Belgian professor of information technology in South Africa
- Lisa van Belle (born 2004), Dutch cyclist and sister of Loe
- Loe van Belle (born 2002), Dutch cyclist and brother of Lisa
- Lyndsey Van Belle (born 2003), Belgian footballer and sister of Shari
- Shari Van Belle (born 1999), Belgian footballer and sister of Lyndsey
- Wouter Van Belle, Belgian musician and producer

== See also ==
- Wesley Vanbelle (born 1986), Belgian footballer
