= Nordlands Framtid =

Norwegian newspaper published in Bodø

Nordlands Framtid ("The Future of Nordland") was a Norwegian newspaper, published in Bodø.

The newspaper was started in 1910 as Saltens Fremtid, published in Sulitjelma and being the Norwegian Labour Party's organ in the southern part of Salten. Published weekly, it expanded to twice a week in 1913. Co-owned by the Labour Party branch in the much larger city of Bodø from 1913, the newspaper moved to Bodø in 1914 and changed its name to Nordlands Social-Demokrat, being circulated three times a week from 1915. The editor-in-chief until 1919 was Edvard Jørstad, and after a brief acting editor, the chair was assumed by Harald Langhelle in 1919.

After Langhelle won a seat in the 1921 Norwegian parliamentary election, Alfred B. Skar took over as substitute editor in 1922. In the ensuing clamour in the Labour Party whether it should adhere to the Twenty-one Conditions and be a Comintern member, the majority in Bodø decided not to do so. Alfred Skar belonged to the minority which broke away and formed the Communist Party of Norway, but as he and his supporters were unable to usurp the newspaper for his new party, they instead started Friheten. Nonetheless, the name "Social-Demokrat" was to be depecrated in the Norwegian Labour Party press at the time, and the newspaper's name was changed to Nordlands Fremtid in 1922, tweaked to Nordlands Framtid in 1945.

The newspaper expanded to being published six times a week from 1937. However, in 1940, the offices and printing press were completely destroyed during the German bombing of Bodø on 27 May. Nordlands Fremtid ceased publication, only to return in 1945, after the war was over.

Nordlands Framtid remained a Labour Party organ until the ties withered in the 1970s. It was a clear "number two" in Bodø in terms of circulation, behind the traditionally conservative Nordlandsposten, but a drive orchestrated by A-pressen from 1985 resulted in Nordlandsposten being surpassed in 1989. In the mid-1990s, however, it became increasingly apparent that the competition was limiting the possibilities of both newspapers, especially in the ad market, and a merger was agreed upon in December 2001. Nordlands Framtid was published for the last time on 16 February 2002, giving way for the new Avisa Nordland.
