= Gunnar Ousland =

Norwegian editor, writer, trade unionist and politician

Gunnar Ousland (8 September, 1877 – 29 January, 1957) was a Norwegian editor, writer, trade unionist and politician for the Labour and Social Democratic Labour parties. He started out as a temperance activist and trade unionist before serving as a politician and in the party press. He edited several magazines and newspapers, including an illegal newspaper during World War II. He was later one of the proponents for the Common Program, and wrote historical books.

== Early life and pre-World War II career ==
He was born in Halsaa og Hartmark Municipality in Lister og Mandal county, the youngest of 11 children of Henrik Tormundsen (1828-1998) and Gunhild Tomine Taraldsdatter (1835-1993). He finished a typographer's education in 1897, and went to Oslo, where he became a member of the typographers' union. He soon began a friendship and professional relationship with fellow typographer Ole O. Lian. In 1898, they founded the Gutenberg Lodge of the IOGT. When in 1907, Lian became chairman of the Norwegian Confederation of Trade Unions, Ousland succeeded him as manager of the union Norsk Centralforening for Boktrykkere. Ousland acted informally as Lian's closest adviser until Lian died.

Ousland was the editor of the union magazine Typografiske Meddelelser 1906 and the temperance magazine Vort Arbeide from 1907 to 1912. In 1911, he was hired in Social-Demokraten. He was the editor-in-chief of Vestfold Social-Demokrat from 1921 to 1926 and Bergens Social-Demokrat from 1926 to 1927, then Bergens Arbeiderblad from 1927 to 1939.

Ousland served as a member of Kristiania city council from 1911 to 1921, and chaired Kristiania Labour Party from 1912 to 1920. In 1921, he was hesitant to join the new party Social Democratic Labour Party of Norway, as he did not want to split the Labour Party, but he eventually did join it. He rejoined the Labour Party when the two parties merged in 1927.

Ousland stood for parliamentary election several times unsuccessfully. In the 1912 Norwegian parliamentary election, he stood in the single-member constituency Hammersborg with Martha Tynæs as deputy. Ousland was defeated by Conservative candidate Olaf Fredrik Rustad with 3,988 to 4,957 votes in the first round; 4,779 to 5,235 in the second. In 1918, the constituency was again carried by Rustad. This time Ousland was the deputy candidate behind Jacob Vidnes.

== World War II and post-war career ==
During the occupation of Norway by Nazi Germany, Ousland edited the illegal newspaper Fri Fagbevegelse from early 1944 to August 1944. It was published out of Drammen. He succeeded Alfred B. Skar and was succeeded by Inge Scheflo. In 1944–1945, he was one of the proponents for the Common Program. The program was given the green light by Sverre Iversen, Labour Party politician and member of Kretsen, and was made by Ousland and three bourgeois politicians, first and foremost Herman Smitt Ingebretsen. It built on the so-called Blåboka, "The Blue Book", written by leading politician Haakon Lie in exile in England.

After the Second World War, the Common Program was manifested in Gerhardsen's First Cabinet. He wrote the book Fellesprogrammet. Hvordan det ble til – og hvordan det blir ført ut i livet about the Common Program in 1947, and also published several books about trade unions. His main work was Fagorganisasjonen i Norge, about trade unions in Norway, first published in 1927. In 1949, it was expanded from one to four volumes and re-released. Ousland wrote three of the four volumes. He wrote a book about contemporary challenges, Fagorganisasjonens problemstilling i dag in 1946, and the union history Norsk Treindustriarbeiderforbund 50 år in 1954.

Media offices
New office	Chief editor of Bergens Arbeiderblad; 1927–1939	Succeeded by Oscar Ihlebæk
