= Avisa Nordland =

Newspaper published in Bodø, Norway

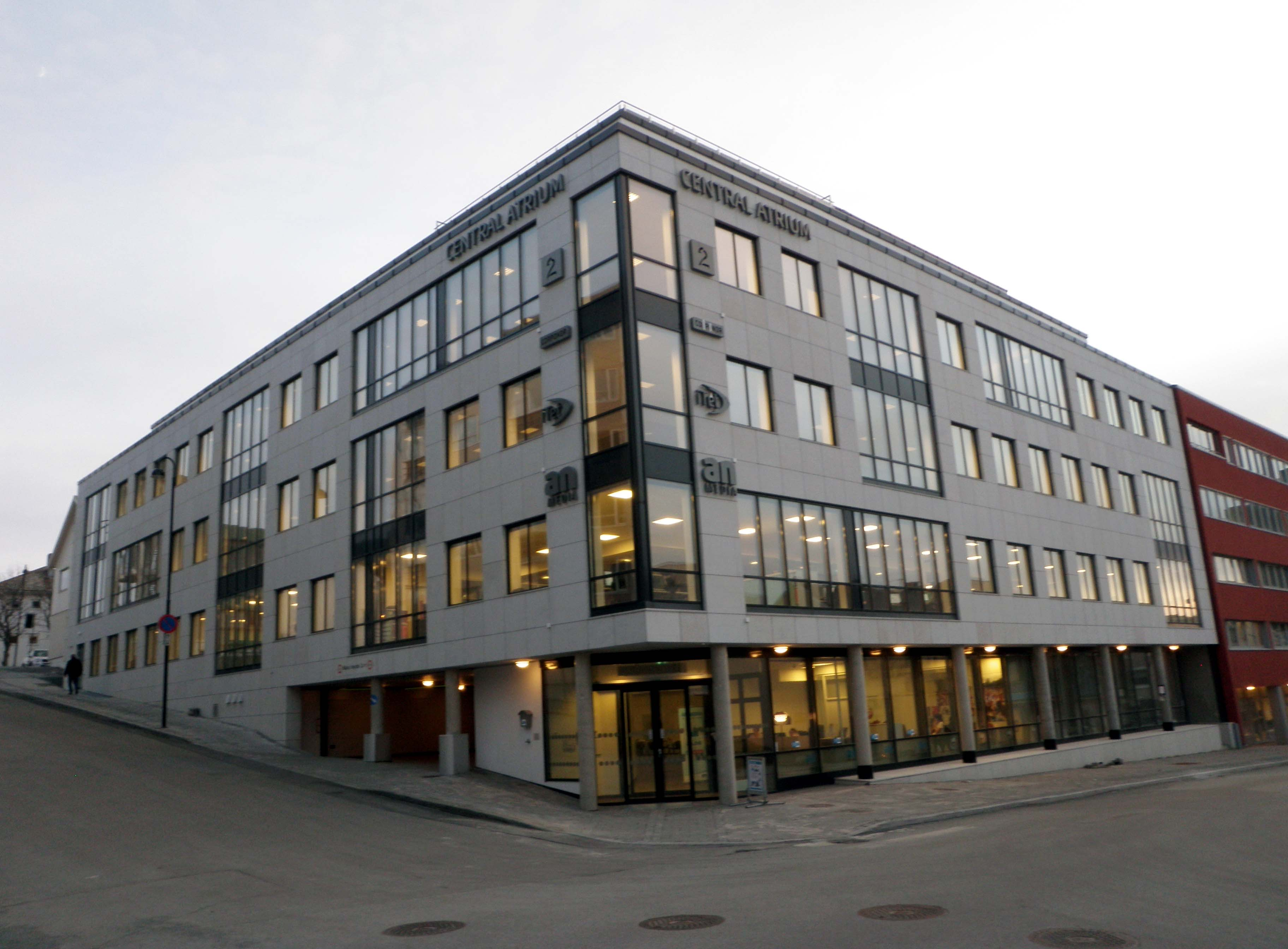
- Headquarters of Avisa Nordland in Bodø
- Type: Daily newspaper
- Format: Tabloid
- Owner(s): Amedia (62.0%) and Harstad Tidende Gruppen AS (38.0%)
- Editor: Jan-Eirik Hanssen
- Founded: February 2002
- Political alignment: Neutral
- Language: Norwegian
- Headquarters: Bodø, Norway
- Circulation: 19,894 (2013)
- Website: an.no

Avisa Nordland is a local newspaper published in Bodø, Norway.

== History and profile ==
Avisa Nordland was established in February 2002 through a controversial merger of the two competing newspapers Nordlandsposten and Nordlands Framtid. Avisa Nordland has its headquarters in central Bodø, and until 2013 occupied most of the bank Nordlandsbankens former premises. In addition it has regional offices in Fauske, Oppeid, and Ørnes.

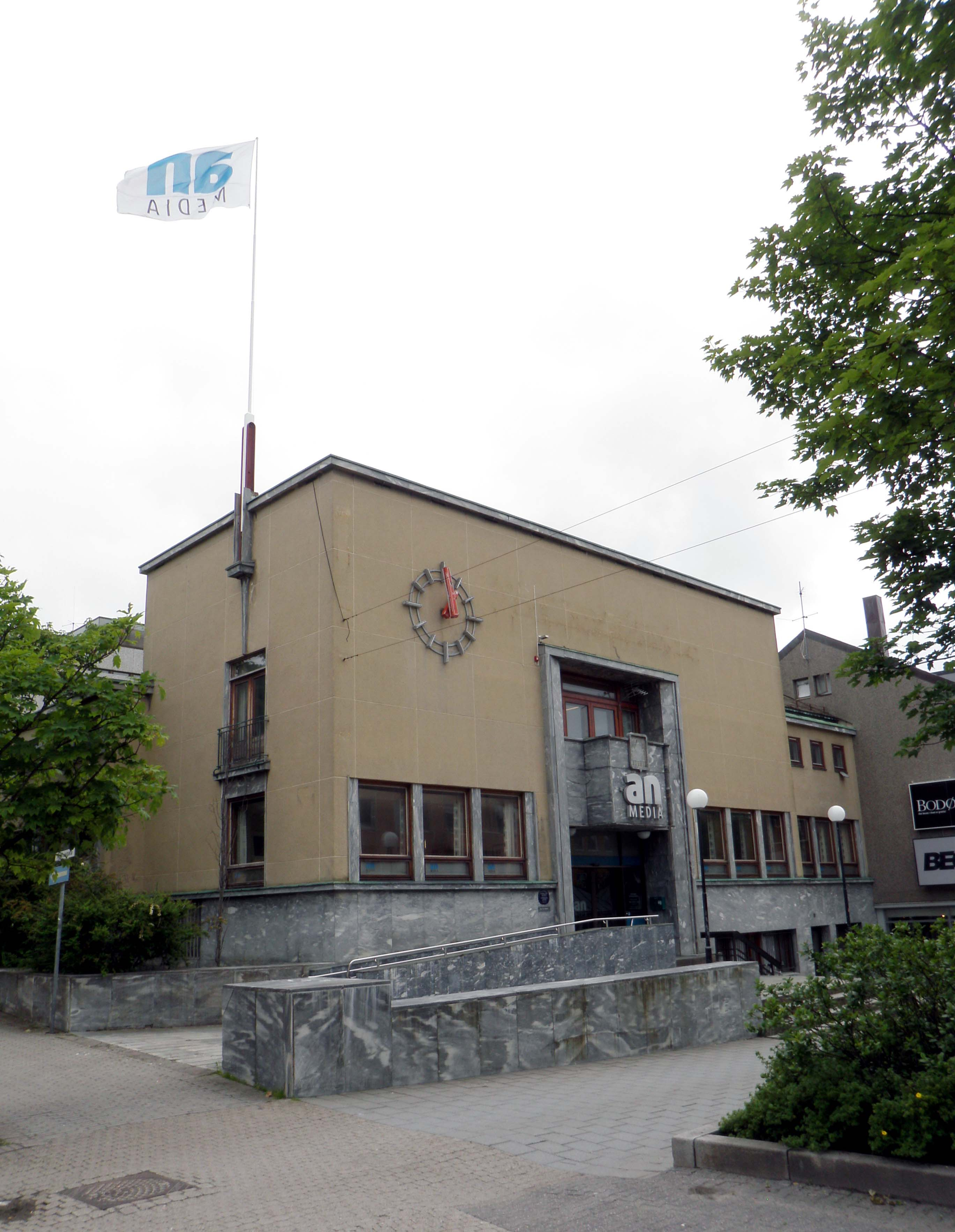
Former (in use until autumn 2013) headquarters of Avisa Nordland in Bodø

In 2013, the newspaper moved its headquarters to a new office building in Bodø called Central Atrium.

Avisa Nordland is part of Amedia. In 2011, the paper won the World Young Reader Prize of WAN/IFRA in the editorial category for political papers.

In 2006 Avisa Nordland had a circulation of about 24,700 copies. It was 19,894 copies in 2013.
