= Monica Nedgård Isaksen =

Norwegian footballer (born 2003)

Monica Isaksen
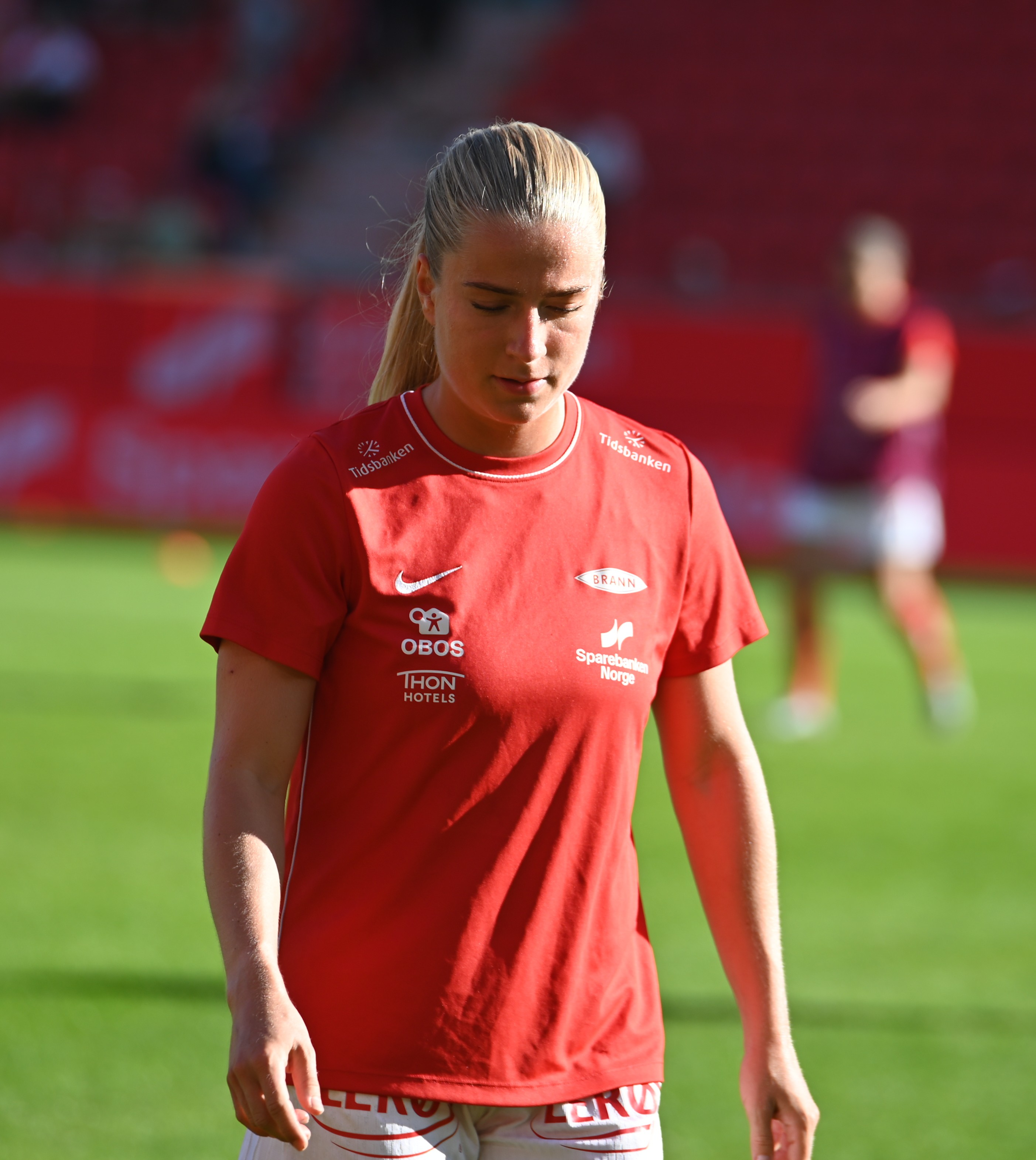

Personal information
- Full name: Monica Nedgård Isaksen
- Date of birth: 8 July 2003 (age 23)
- Position: Striker

Team information
- Current team: Brann
- Number: 19

Youth career
- –2018: Fjellhamar
- 2018–2021: Lyn

Senior career*
Years	Team	Apps	(Gls)
2020–2023	Lyn	28	(2)
2023–2024	Stabæk	38	(10)
2025–	Brann	38	(11)

International career^{‡}
2018	Norway U15	3	(1)
2019	Norway U16	14	(6)
2022	Norway U19	5	(4)
2023–2025	Norway U23	6	(1)
- * Club domestic league appearances and goals as of 26 June 2026 ‡ National team caps and goals as of 26 June 2026

Monica Nedgård Isaksen (born 8 July 2003) is a Norwegian footballer who plays as a forward for SK Brann.

== Career ==
Starting her youth career in Fjellhamar FK, she moved to Lyn in 2018 and became a member of their senior squad in 2020. Having made her debut in the 2019 cup, Isaksen did not play a single football match in 2020 and only made her league debut in August 2021.

Isaksen also played for Norway U15 and U16, then after her time away from playing, returned to Norway U19 in 2022.

In 2022 she was injured again, damaging a cruciate ligament. In the summer of 2023 she went on a free transfer to Lyn's Toppserien neighbours Stabæk.

After the 2024 season she was bought by SK Brann. She reportedly rejected a transfer to a Swedish club. Having scored twice in her debut against Rosenborg, under manager Martin Ho, Isaksen fell out of favour after Leif Gunnar Smerud took over as manager. She won the 2025 Toppserien with Brann, who refused to sell her despite concrete bids from Hammarby and West Ham. Bergensavisen also wrote about interest from Danish and Serie A clubs.

== Personal life ==
She is a twin sister with Michael, who played for the youth teams of Lyn and Lillestrøm.

She studied law.
