= Alfred B. Skar =

Norwegian newspaper editor, writer, trade unionist and politician

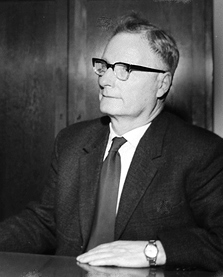

Alfred B. Skar (30 January 1896 – 24 December 1969) was a Norwegian newspaper editor, writer, trade unionist and politician for the Labour and Communist parties.

He was born in Sørfold Municipality, and worked as a fisherman, construction worker and farm worker in his early career. He edited the newspapers Folkets Frihet from 1918 to 1919, Folkeviljen from 1919 to 1922 and Nordlands Fremtid from 1922 to 1923. In 1923 he joined the Communist Party and edited Friheten from 1923 to 1927 as well as briefly in 1928. He also chaired the county party chapter from 1924 to 1926, was a member of the Communist Party national board and central board and headed the ballot for the 1927 parliamentary election.

In 1928 he left the Communist Party and rejoined the Labour Party, but he soon joined the communists again and headed the ballot in Akershus county for the 1930 parliamentary election. From 1928 to 1932 he worked in the newspapers Norges Kommunistblad and Arbeideren, from 1932 he was in charge of the Communist Party publishing business, until he fell from grace in the party in 1933. From 1934 he worked in Arbeidermagasinet.

During the occupation of Norway by Nazi Germany, Skar edited the illegal newspaper Fri Fagbevegelse from October 1943 to 1944. He succeeded Oddvar Halvorsen and was succeeded by Gunnar Ousland.

From 1946 to 1961 he was the director of press and information in the Norwegian Confederation of Trade Unions. He published both novels and short story collections before and after the Second World War, and released several books about trade unions: Fagorganisasjonen under okkupasjonen (1949), Norsk lokomotivmannsforbund gjennom 60 år 1893–1953 (1953), Fagbevegelsen – en av demokratiets hjørnesteiner (1957), Norsk fagbevegelse. Dens oppbygging og virkemåte (1963) and På vei mot den gryende dag. Norsk kommuneforbund gjennom 50 år (1969). He died in December 1969, and was buried in Gamlebyen.
