= Chiara Beccari =

Italian footballer (born 2004)

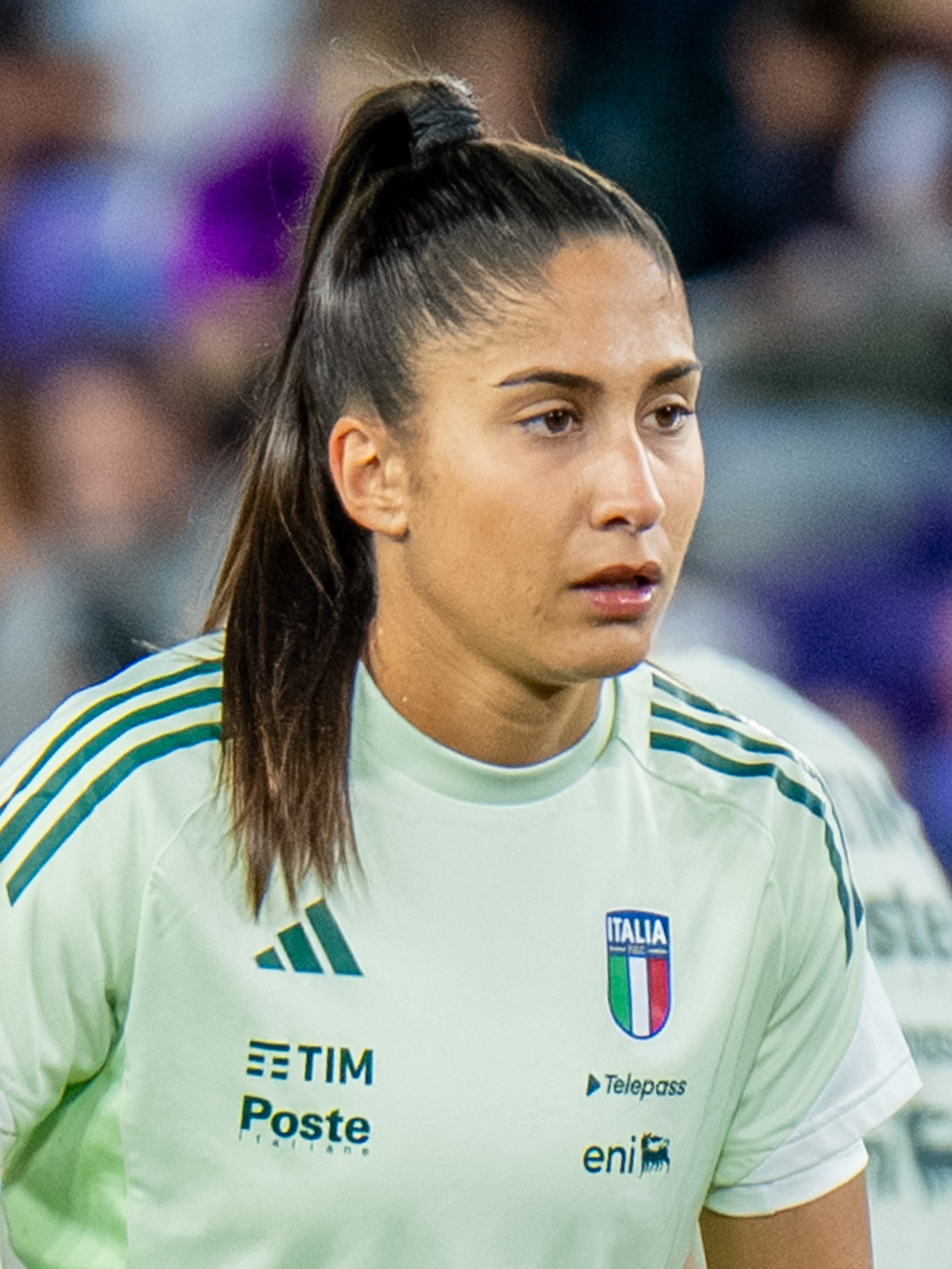
- Beccari with Italy in 2025

Personal information
- Date of birth: 27 September 2004 (age 22)
- Place of birth: City of San Marino, San Marino
- Height: 1.69 m (5 ft 7 in)
- Position: Forward

Team information
- Current team: Juventus
- Number: 9

Youth career
- 2012–2019: San Marino
- 2019–2021: Juventus

Senior career*
Years	Team	Apps	(Gls)
2018–2019	San Marino		
2021–	Juventus	59	(9)
2022–2023	→ Como (loan)	21	(5)
2023–2024	→ Sassuolo (loan)	23	(5)

International career^{‡}
2019	Italy U17	3	(2)
2021–2022	Italy U19	12	(10)
2023–	Italy	14	(2)
- * Club domestic league appearances and goals as of 24 March 2025 ‡ National team caps and goals as of 14 November 2024

Chiara Beccari (born 27 September 2004) is a professional footballer who plays as a forward for Serie A club Juventus. Born in San Marino, she represents Italy internationally. She has previously played for Sammarinese club San Marino Academy and Italian clubs Como and Sassuolo.

== Club career ==
=== San Marino Academy ===
Beccari played in the youth teams of the San Marino Academy.

=== Juventus ===
In 2019, Beccari joined Juventus, playing for their Primavera (under-19) team. She scored 34 goals in two seasons and helped win the Torneo di Viareggio. In August 2021, Beccari made her debut for Juventus' senior squad in the Serie A against Pomigliano. In September 2021, Beccari made her continental debut in the 2021–22 UEFA Women's Champions League qualifying rounds coming on as a substitute in injury time during a 2–0 victory over Albanian club Vllaznia.

=== Loans to Como and Sassuolo ===
In July 2022, Beccari was loaned to Como. In November 2022, she scored with a penalty kick an equaliser against parent club Juventus. During her time at Como, Beccari scored five league goals and was the club's top scorer. After making five first team appearances for Juventus in the 2022–23 Serie A season and following her loan to Como, Beccari signed her first professional contract with Juventus in April 2023, with the three-year contract starting in July. In June 2023, she was named the best under-21 player of the 2022–23 Serie A season.

In July 2023, Beccari was loaned to Sassuolo for the 2023–24 Serie A season. In December 2023, she was named 5th best youth (under-20) player of the year by IFFHS. Beccari had a successful loan period at Sassuolo, showcasing her potential and technical skillset, and in June 2024 returned to Juventus, signing a new contract until June 2027. In March 2025, she further extended her contract until June 2028.

== International career ==
Beccari represented Italian youth teams, scoring many goals. In October 2021, she scored her first goals for Italy under-19, scoring a brace against Poland during the 2022 UEFA Women's Under-19 Championship qualification stage. In the 2022 UEFA Women's Under-19 Championship tournament, she scored a goal against Czech Republic in a 4–0 victory, but it wasn't enough for Italy to advance from the group stage.

In April 2023, Beccari made her debut for Italy's senior team, starting a friendly match against Colombia and assisted Valentina Giacinti who scored the first goal of the 2–1 victory.

In July 2023, Beccari was called-up for Italy's squad for the 2023 FIFA Women's World Cup.

In July 2024, Beccari scored her first goal for Italy's senior team, opening the scoring in a 4–0 victory over Finland during the UEFA Women's Euro 2025 qualifying League A.

== Career statistics ==
=== Club ===
As of match played 8 February 2026

Appearances and goals by club, season and competition
Club	Season	League			Cups		Continental		Total	
Club	Season	Division	Apps	Goals	Apps	Goals	Apps	Goals	Apps	Goals
Juventus	2021-22	Serie A	2	0	2	0	1	0	5	0
Juventus	Total		2	0	2	0	1	0	5	0
FC Como (loan)	2022-23	Serie A	21	5	0	0	0	0	21	5
FC Como (loan)	Total		21	5	0	0	0	0	21	5
Sassuolo (loan)	2023-24	Serie A	21	5	2	0	0	0	23	5
Sassuolo (loan)	Total		21	5	2	0	0	0	23	5
Juventus	2024-25	Serie A	20	3	4	1	6	0	30	4
Juventus	2025–26	Serie A	12	4	7	0	5	1	24	5
Juventus	Total		42	7	11	1	11	1	54	9
Career total			88	17	15	1	12	1	115	19

=== Youth ===
As of match played 16 February 2023

Appearances and goals by national youth team and year
National team	Year	Apps	Goals
Italy U17	2019	3	2
Italy U19	2021	6	6
Italy U19	2022	8	4
Italy U19	2023	1	0
Total		18	12

=== Senior ===
As of match played 2 December 2025

Appearances and goals by national team and year
National team	Year	Apps	Goals
Italy	2023	7	0
Italy	2024	7	2
Italy	2025	6	0
Total		20	2

=== International goals ===
No.	Date	Venue	Opponent	Score	Result	Competition
1.	16 July 2024	Stadio Druso, Bolzano, Italy	Finland	1–0	4–0	UEFA Women's Euro 2025 qualifying
2.	29 October 2024	Stadio Romeo Menti, Vicenza, Italy	Spain	1–1	1–1	Friendly

== Style of play ==
Beccari is a prototype of a modern striker, with good technical skills and impressive physicality, finishing with precision on the run. She said she draws inspiration from Cristiana Girelli, learning from her to give everything in training and aspiring for her eye for goal.

== Personal life ==
Beccari was born in San Marino to Mauro who is a former baseball player.
