= Oscar Ihlebæk =

Norwegian resistance member

Oscar Ihlebæk (9 October 1900 – 10 March 1945) was a Norwegian newspaper editor and resistance member.

== History ==
Ihlebæk was born in Drammen to a mother from Skoger and a father from Rakkestad. In 1926, he married Fredrikke Wium from Drammen, and they had two children. At the time he resided in Asker where he chaired the local Socialist Youth League chapter.

He had secondary education. He was a journalist in his hometown newspaper Fremtiden, then the main organ of the Social Democratic Labour Party, Den nye Social-Demokraten, before becoming a subeditor in Bergens Arbeiderblad in 1927. He was promoted to editor-in-chief in 1939. He was a board member of the Norwegian Press Association from 1936, and from 1939 he was a deputy board member in Den Nationale Scene.

During the occupation of Norway by Nazi Germany he was fired by the Nazi authorities in November 1940. He joined the Norwegian resistance movement, but was captured. He was imprisoned in Espeland concentration camp from 29 January 1943, then Grini concentration camp from 11 May 1943. In the winter, he was sent to Germany. He was held in Sachsenhausen concentration camp from 15 December 1943, then Gross-Rosen concentration camp from 26 December 1944. He was later moved to Bergen-Belsen, where he died.

Media offices
Preceded by Gunnar Ousland	Chief editor of Bergens Arbeiderblad; 1939–1940	Succeeded by position abolished
