= Bergens Social-Demokrat =

Norwegian newspaper

Bergens Social-Demokrat was a Norwegian newspaper, published in Bergen.

It was started on 15 May 1922 as an organ for the Social Democratic Labour Party of Norway, who broke away from the Labour Party in 1921. From 1 April 1924 it was published daily, but in 1925 it reverted to being published twice a week. The newspaper went defunct in 1927, the same year as the Social Democratic Labour Party re-merged with Labour. The last editor, from 1926 to 1927, Gunnar Ousland, subsequently became editor of a new Labour newspaper, Bergens Arbeiderblad.
