= Nordlandsposten =

Norwegian newspaper

Nordlandsposten was a daily newspaper published in Bodø Municipality in Nordland county, Norway.

== History and profile ==
Nordlandsposten was first published in 1862. The paper had a conservative stance. In 2002, its circulation was 15,448 copies.

In autumn 2001, both Nordlands Framtid and Nordlandsposten were bought out by A-pressen and Harstad Tidende-gruppen in order to start a new newspaper in Bodø, which would join the two together. The new newspaper, Avisa Nordland, was first published on 18 February 2002.
