= Friheten (Nordland) =

Norwegian newspaper

Friheten ("The Freedom") was a Norwegian newspaper, published in Nordland county.

Friheten was started on 6 December 1923 as the Communist Party organ in the county. It was published weekly; from 1925 twice a week. However, the party struggled economically and the newspaper went defunct after its last issue on 6 December 1928.

Editor-in-chief from 1923 to 1927 was Alfred B. Skar.
