= Maria Moles =

Andorran footballer (born 2003)

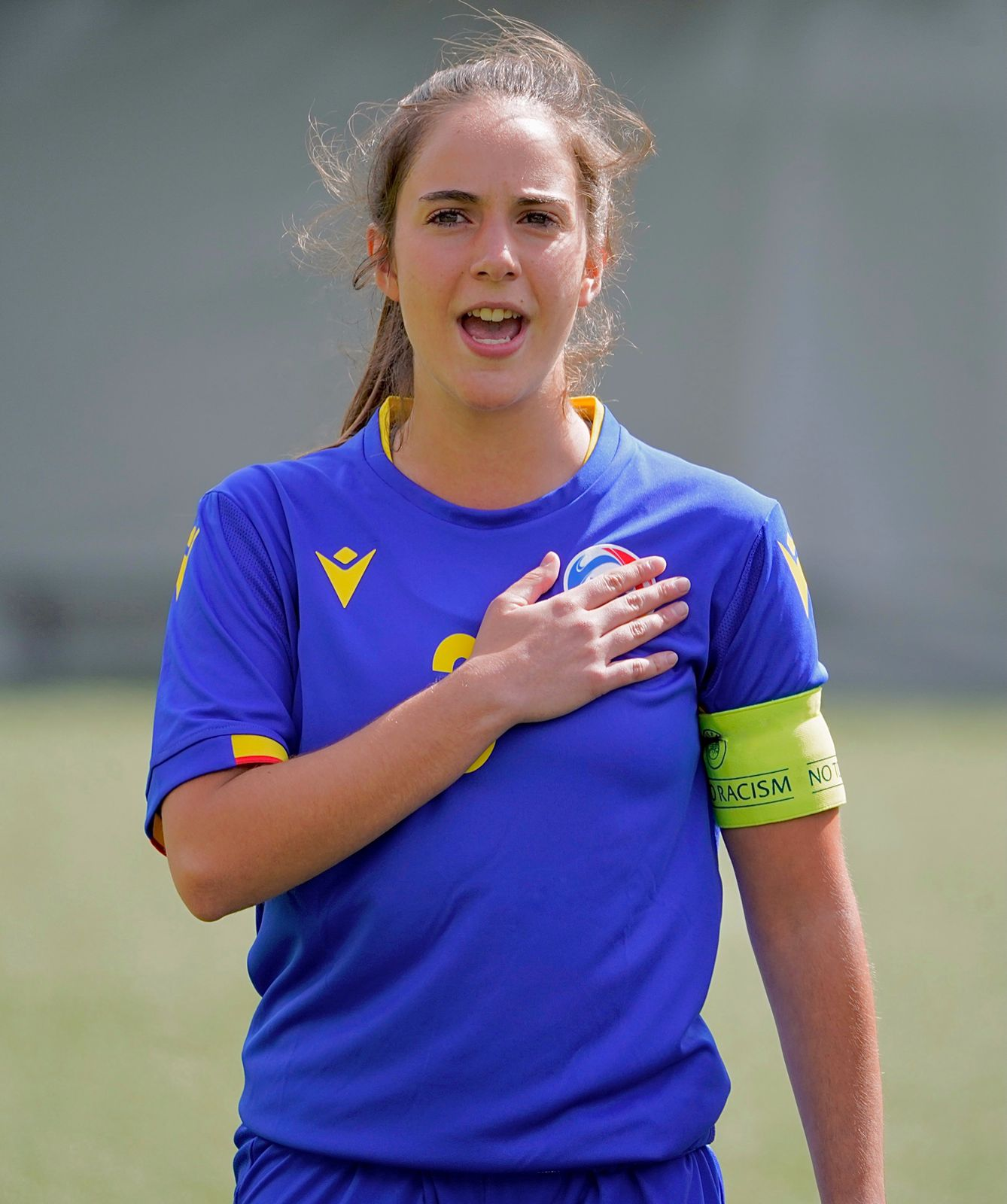

Personal information
- Full name: Maria Moles Farré
- Date of birth: 8 May 2003 (age 23)
- Position: Midfielder

Team information
- Current team: Levante Las Planas Juvenil A

Youth career
- Levante Las Planas

International career^{‡}
| Years | Team | Apps | (Gls) |
| 2018 | Andorra U17 | 3 | (0) |
| 2021– | Andorra | 1 | (0) |
- ‡ National team caps and goals as of 18 September 2021.

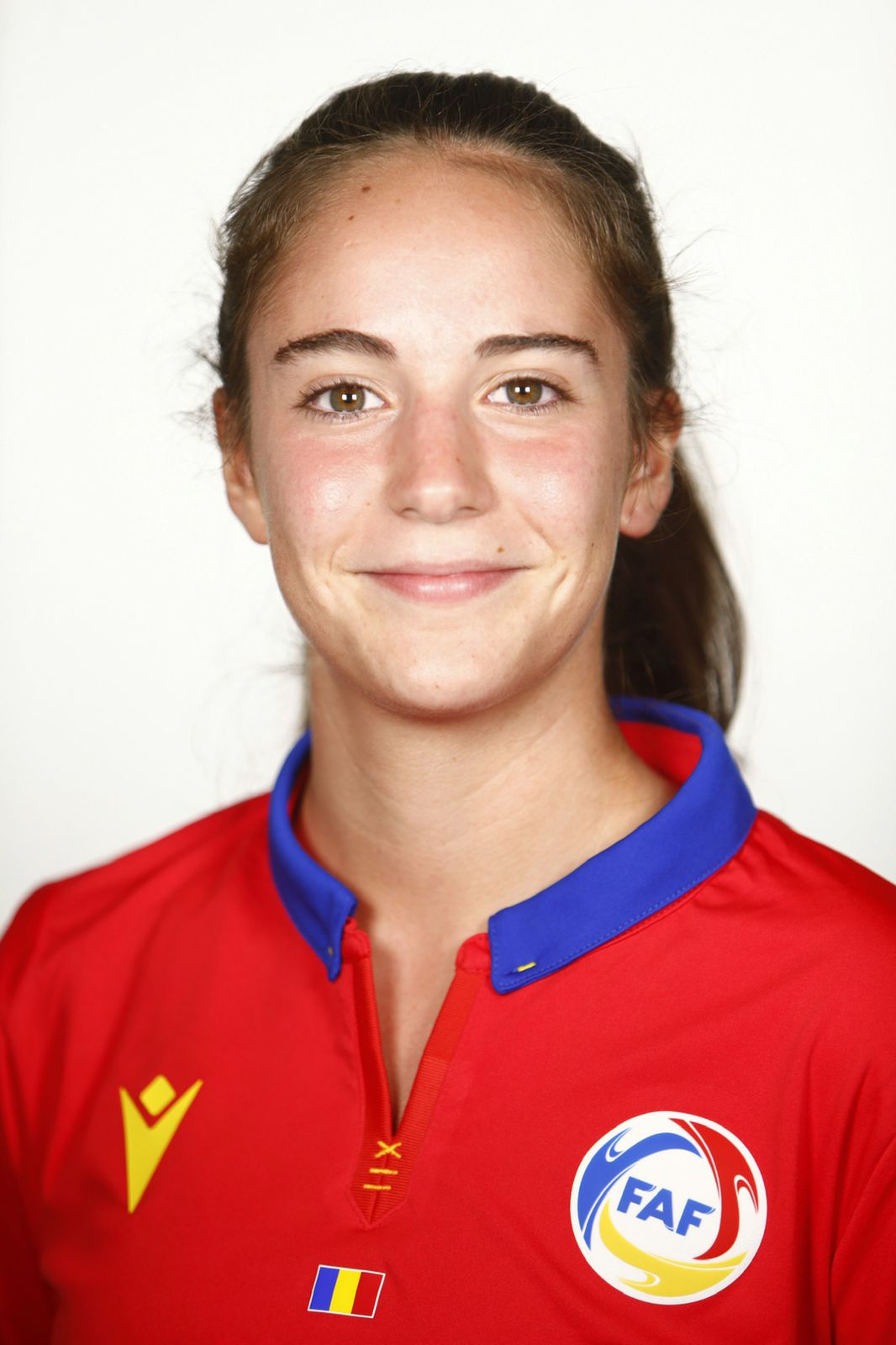

Maria Moles Farré (born 8 May 2003) is an Andorran footballer who plays as a midfielder for the youth team of Spanish club FC Levante Las Planas and the Andorra women's national team.

== Club career ==
Moles is a product of Levante Las Planas in Spain.

== International career ==
Moles capped for Andorra at senior level in a 4–2 friendly away win over Liechtenstein on 18 September 2021.

== See also ==
- List of Andorra women's international footballers
