= Shari Van Belle =

Belgian footballer

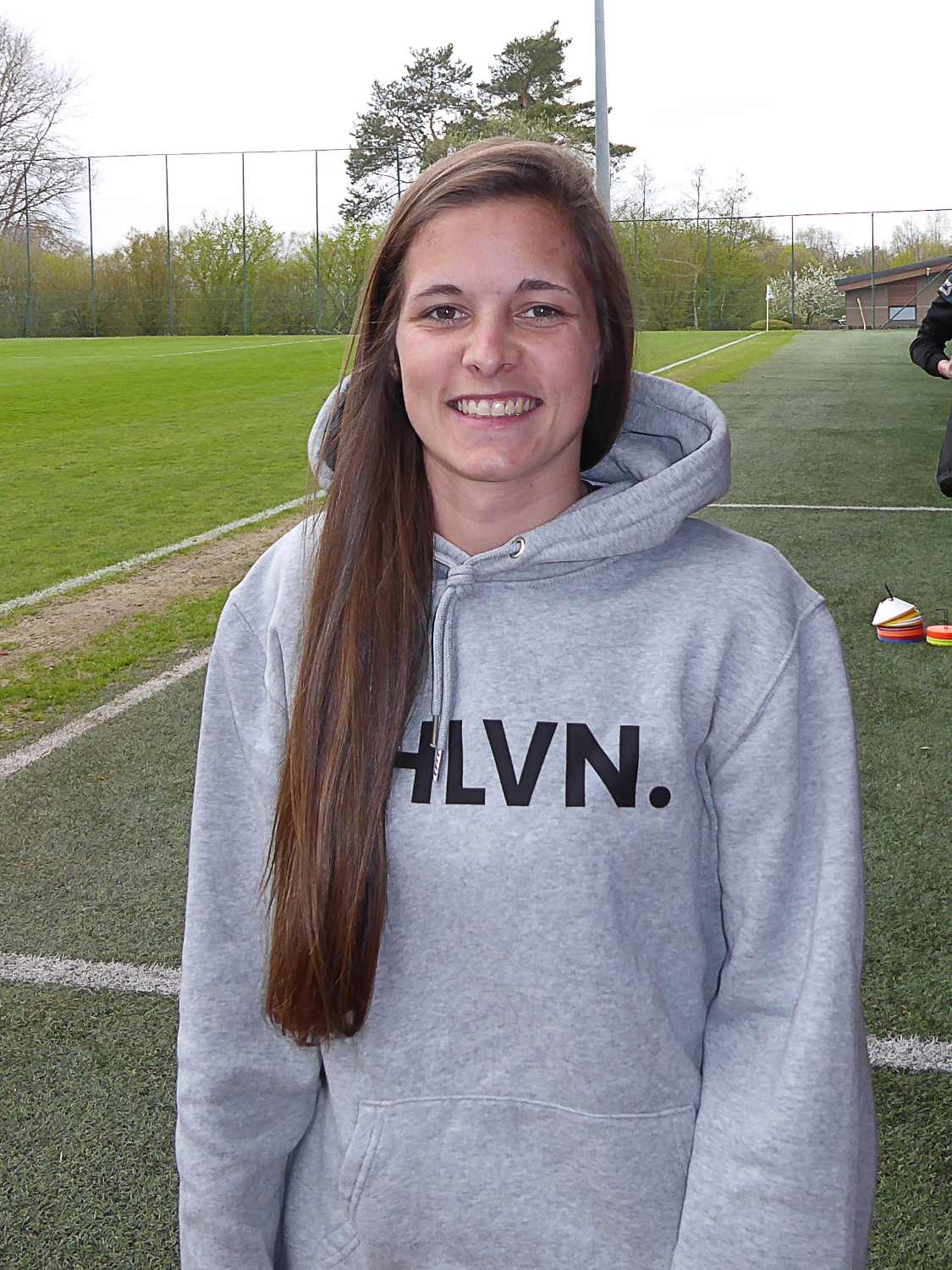
- Shari Van Belle in 2023

Personal information
- Full name: Shari Van Belle
- Date of birth: 22 December 1999 (age 26)
- Place of birth: Belgium
- Height: 1.64 m (5 ft 5 in)
- Position: Defender

Team information
- Current team: RSC Anderlecht
- Number: 26

Youth career
- KSKL Ternat
- FC Schepdaal
- Eendracht Alost Ladies
- RSC Anderlecht

Senior career*
Years	Team	Apps	(Gls)
2015–2022	Gent	44	(14)
2022–2023	OH Leuven	31	(1)
2023–2024	Genk	2	(0)
2024–2025	Standard Liège	0	(0)
2025–2026	SGS Essen	19	(1)
2026–	RSC Anderlecht	0	(0)

International career^{‡}
2016	Belgium U17	3	(0)
2016–2018	Belgium U19	12	(3)
2019–	Belgium	13	(0)
- * Club domestic league appearances and goals as of 29 March 2026 ‡ National team caps and goals as of 8 October 2022

Shari Van Belle (born 22 December 1999) is a Belgian footballer who plays as a defender for Belgian Women's Super League club RSC Anderlecht and the Belgium women's national team.

== Club career ==
Van Belle played for Belgian clubs Gent, OH Leuven and Genk, before joining Standard Liège in January 2024.

In July 2025, Van Belle moved to Frauen-Bundesliga club SGS Essen.

For the 2026/27 season, Van Belle returned to Belgium and joined RSC Anderlecht where she signed a two-year contract.

== International career ==
Van Belle was part of the Belgian national team which won their first title in history at the 2022 Pinatar Cup.

== Personal life ==
Van Belle is in a same-sex relationship with Belgian footballer Nicky Evrard. Her younger sister, Lyndsey, is also a footballer.

== Honors ==
=== Club ===
Gent

- Belgian Women's Cup: 2017, 2019

=== International ===
Belgium

- Pinatar Cup: 2022
