= Aglia Iliadhi =

Albanian footballer

Personal information
- Date of birth: 30 November 2004 (age 21)
- Place of birth: Vlorë, Albania
- Position: Midfielder

Team information
- Current team: Apolonia

Senior career*
Years	Team	Apps	(Gls)
2018–	Apolonia		

International career^{‡}
2021–	Albania	1	(0)
- * Club domestic league appearances and goals ‡ National team caps and goals as of 19:16, 30 November 2021 (UTC)

Aglia Iliadhi (born 30 November 2004) is an Albanian footballer who plays as a midfielder for Apolonia and the Albania national team.

== International career ==
Iliadhi made her debut for the Albania national team on 30 November 2021, coming on as a substitute for Qendresa Krasniqi against Kosovo.
