= Nelly Rodrigues =

Portuguese footballer (born 2003)

Personal information
- Full name: Nelly da Cruz Rodrigues
- Date of birth: 27 May 2003 (age 23)
- Place of birth: Soisy-sous-Montmorency, France
- Position: Full-back

Team information
- Current team: Marseille
- Number: 27

Youth career
- 2019–2022: Paris Saint-Germain

Senior career*
Years	Team	Apps	(Gls)
2022	Paris Saint-Germain	1	(0)
2022–2023	Marseille	18	(4)
2023–2026	Nantes	41	(2)
2026–	Marseille	0	(0)

International career^{‡}
2020	Portugal U17	5	(0)
2021–2022	Portugal U19	11	(0)
2022–2023	Portugal U23	14	(0)
2021	Portugal B	2	(0)
2024–	Portugal	2	(0)
- * Club domestic league appearances and goals as of 8 October 2025 ‡ National team caps and goals as of 29 October 2024.

Nelly da Cruz Rodrigues (born 27 May 2003) is a Portuguese professional footballer who plays as a full-back for Première Ligue club Marseille and the Portugal national team.

== International career ==
Rodrigues made her debut for Portugal against the Czech Republic on February 21, 2024, in a 3–1 victory.
