= Nadezhda Ivanova (footballer) =

Bulgarian footballer (born 2004)

Personal information
- Full name: Nadezhda Stoyanova Ivanova
- Date of birth: 17 December 2004 (age 21)
- Height: 1.64 m (5 ft 4 1/2 in)
- Position: Forward

Team information
- Current team: WFC Ludogorets
- Number: 99

Senior career*
Years	Team	Apps	(Gls)
–2021	First Vienna FC 1894 U20		
2021–2022	Freiburg II		
2022–2024	SC Sand	15	(0)
2024–2025	Beylerbeyi	0	(0)
2025–2026	USC Landhaus	25	(6)
2026–	WFC Ludogorets	0	(0)
- * Club domestic league appearances and goals

Nadezhda Stoyanova Ivanova (Bulgarian: Надежда Стоянова Иванова) (born 17 December 2004) is a Bulgarian women's football forward who plays in the Bulgarian Women's League for WFC Ludogorets Razgrad in Razgrad.

== Club career ==
Ivanova is 1.64 m (5 ft 4 1/2 in) tall, and plays in the midfielder position kicking with left foot.

She went to Austria, and joined the U20 team of the First Vienna FC 1894. In July 2021, she moved to Germany, and played for SC Freiburg II in the Regionalliga Südwest. The next year, she transferred to the 2. Frauen-Bundesliga club SC Sand.

In July 2024, she went to Turkey, and signed with the Istanbul-based club Beylerbeyi to play in the Super League. She did not play in any match, and left the country on 3 October 2024.
