= Inka Sarjanoja =

Finnish footballer (born 2004)

Personal information
- Date of birth: 17 January 2004 (age 22)
- Place of birth: Finland
- Position: Midfielder

Youth career
- –2020: ONS

Senior career*
Years	Team	Apps	(Gls)
2020–2023	ONS	68	(35)
2023–2024	KIF Örebro	24	(6)

International career^{‡}
2019	Finland U16	2	(0)
2021–2023	Finland U19	13	(1)
2023–	Finland U23	5	(2)
- * Club domestic league appearances and goals as of 31 December 2024 ‡ National team caps and goals as of 31 December 2024

Inka Sarjanoja (born 17 January 2004) is a Finnish professional footballer who most recently played as a midfielder for Damallsvenskan club KIF Örebro.
