= Danique Noordman =

Dutch footballer (born 2004)

Personal information
- Full name: Danique Maria Noordman
- Date of birth: 21 February 2004 (age 22)
- Place of birth: Zwolle, Netherlands
- Height: 1.68 m (5 ft 6 in)
- Position: Midfielder

Team information
- Current team: Juventus
- Number: 16

Youth career
- –2013: VV Vilsteren
- 2013–2019: SV Dalfsen
- 2018–2019: FC Dalfsen
- 2019–2020: PEC Zwolle

Senior career*
Years	Team	Apps	(Gls)
2020–2023	PEC Zwolle	61	(8)
2023–2026	Ajax	44	(5)
2026–	Juventus	0	(0)

International career^{‡}
2018	Netherlands U15	3	(0)
2018–2019	Netherlands U16	9	(2)
2019–2020	Netherlands U17	5	(1)
2021–2023	Netherlands U19	24	(5)
2022	Netherlands U20	8	(1)
2023–	Netherlands U23	15	(1)
- * Club domestic league appearances and goals as of 20:49, 4 July 2026 (UTC) ‡ National team caps and goals as of 23:30, 8 October 2026 (UTC)

Danique Maria Noordman (born 21 February 2004) is a Dutch professional footballer who plays as a midfielder for Serie A Women club Juventus. She has previously played for Vrouwen Eredivisie clubs PEC Zwolle and Ajax.

== Early life ==
Noordman was born and raised in Zwolle, Netherlands. She grew up alongside two other brothers, both of whom also enjoyed football in their youth. Noordman's first club was VV Vilsteren, where she played before moving to SV Dalfsen at the age of 9. She spent six years at Dalfsen, often playing among boys. In 2019, she signed for hometown side PEC Zwolle.

== Club career ==
=== PEC Zwolle ===
At 16 years old, Noordman made her Vrouwen Eredivisie debut, playing for PEC Zwolle in a match against ADO Den Haag. In her first season of top-flight football, she appeared in 8 matches, mostly as a substitute. She then spent two more years in Zwolle and became one of the team's more consistent starters. She registered 8 goals in over 60 appearances across her three-season stint.

=== Ajax ===
On 16 August 2023, Noordman was announced to have joined AFC Ajax on a three-year contract; Ajax had been her dream club since she was a child. Less than a month later, Noordman made her Ajax debut in an KNVB Cup match. She then participated in her first Eredivisie match with Ajax on 15 September 2023. Exactly two months later, Noordman made her UEFA Women's Champions League appearance in a group stage match. In February 2024, she scored her first goal for Ajax. Noordman ultimately spent most of her first season at Ajax primarily as a substitute. She earned her first title with the club on 20 May 2024, contributing to Ajax's KNVB Cup win.

In the 2024–25 season, Noordman started nearly every game for Ajax. On 4 September 2024, she scored an extra time goal against Ukrainian side Kolos Kovalivka in an eventual 4–1 Champions League qualification victory. The following year, Noordman earned recognition on the Eredivisie Team of the Season after recording 4 goals and 3 assists across 28 appearances. Despite having extended her contract with Ajax until 2027 in November 2025, she departed from the club at the end of the 2025–26 campaign. She left having made over 65 appearances across all competitions in her three-season tenure. Additionally, since joining Ajax, Noordman accumulated the highest total number of individual duels and successful tackles among all of her teammates; she also played in the third-most matches out of any other player in that timespan (fewer than only Regina van Eijk and Sherida Spitse).

=== Juventus ===
On 4 July 2026, Ajax transferred Noordman to Italian Serie A club Juventus for a fee reportedly around €180,000. Noordman subsequently penned a three-year deal for Juventus, lasting until 2029.

== International career ==
Noordman earned her first appearance in the Netherlands youth national team system at age 14, playing for the under-15 national team in a friendly against Germany 18 April 2018. She then progressed through multiple different age groups, including regular stints with the under-17s and under-23s. In 2019 and 2020, she made 5 appearances for the U17s and scored a goal against Latvia. Two years later, Noordman was named to the squad that reached fourth place in the 2022 FIFA U-20 Women's World Cup; despite having been unsure that she would make the final roster at all, Noordman played in five matches after an injury to Ella Peddemors opened more opportunities in the Dutch midfield. The following year, she helped the Netherlands reach the semifinals of the 2023 UEFA Women's Under-19 Championship.

In October 2023, Noordman was called up to the Netherlands senior national team for the first time, joining the squad ahead of UEFA Women's Nations League matches after Wieke Kaptein had to withdraw due to injury.
