= Jade Nassi =

Moroccan footballer (born 2003)

Jade Nassi جاد ناسي
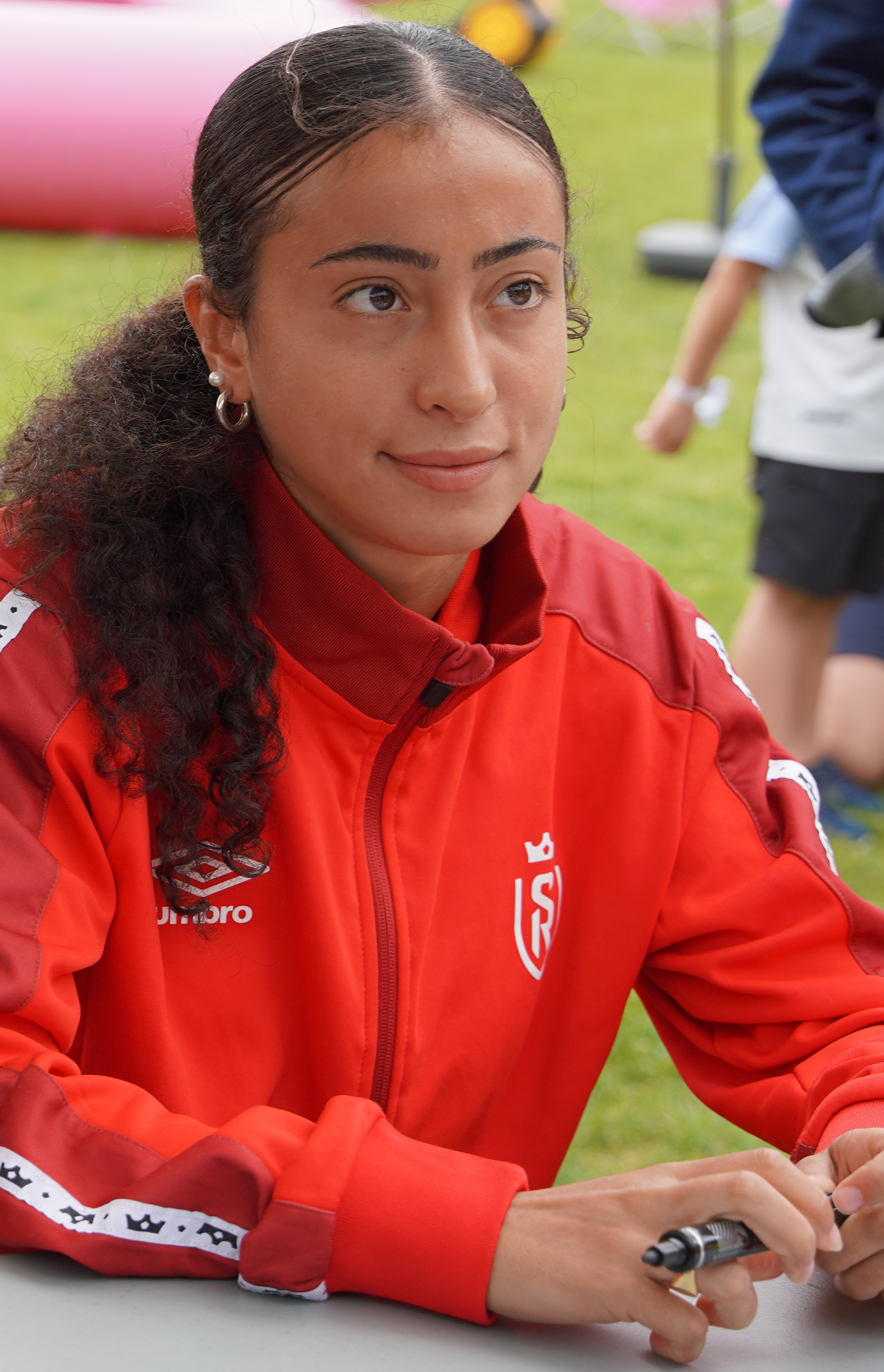
- Nassi with Reims in 2023

Personal information
- Full name: Jade Geneviève Zohra Nassi
- Date of birth: 26 April 2003 (age 23)
- Place of birth: Vannes, France
- Height: 1.64 m (5 ft 5 in)
- Position: Midfielder

Team information
- Current team: Reims
- Number: 11

Youth career
- 2019–2020: Vannes
- 2020–2022: Saint-Malo

Senior career*
Years	Team	Apps	(Gls)
2020–2022	Saint-Malo	27	(5)
2022–2023	Nantes	14	(1)
2023–2025	Reims	32	(1)

International career^{‡}
2020	France U17	1	(0)
2021	France U19	3	(0)
2023	France U23	1	(0)
2024–	Morocco		
- * Club domestic league appearances and goals as of 3 February 2025 ‡ National team caps and goals as of 30 May 2024

Jade Geneviève Zohra Nassi (Arabic: جاد جينيفيف زهرة ناسي; born 26 April 2003) is a professional footballer who plays as a midfielder for Prèmiere Ligue club Reims. Born in France, she represents Morocco at international level.

== International goals ==
No.	Date	Venue	Opponent	Score	Result	Competition
1.	5 June 2026	Moulay Hassan Stadium, Rabat, Morocco	Benin	4–1	4–2	Friendly
