= Wilma Forsblom =

Finnish footballer (born 2003)

Personal information
- Date of birth: 6 September 2003 (age 23)
- Place of birth: Finland
- Positions: Midfielder; forward

Team information
- Current team: Glasgow City

Youth career
- EBK

Senior career*
Years	Team	Apps	(Gls)
2019–2022	PK-35 Vantaa	68	(34)
2020–2021	→ EBK (loan)	5	(4)
2023	KuPS	23	(11)
2024–	Glasgow City	17	(5)

International career^{‡}
2019	Finland U17	9	(1)
2021–2022	Finland U19	8	(2)
2022–	Finland U23	10	(7)
- * Club domestic league appearances and goals as of 29 December 2024 ‡ National team caps and goals as of 29 December 2024

Wilma Forsblom (born 6 September 2003) is a Finnish professional footballer who plays as a midfielder for Glasgow City in Scottish Women's Premier League.

== Honours ==
KuPS

- Kansallinen Liiga: 2023
- Finnish Women's Cup: 2023
