= Anastasia Ferrara =

Italian footballer (born 2004)

Personal information
- Date of birth: 24 October 2004 (age 22)
- Place of birth: Rome, Italy
- Position: Midfielder

Youth career
- –2023: Roma
- 2023–2024: Sassuolo

Senior career*
Years	Team	Apps	(Gls)
2021–2023	Roma	1	(0)
2023–2024	→ Sassuolo	3	(0)
2024	→ Ternana	16	(0)
2024–2026	Genoa	39	(4)

International career^{‡}
2020	Italy U16	3	(1)
2019	Italy U17	1	(0)
2021–2023	Italy U19	20	(1)
2023	Italy U23	2	(0)
- * Club domestic league appearances and goals as of 21 May 2026 ‡ National team caps and goals as of 21 May 2026

Anastasia Ferrara (born 24 October 2004) is an Italian footballer who plays as a midfielder.

== Youth career ==
Ferrara began her football journey in Rome, joining the youth academy of AS Roma in the 2015–16 season. She progressed through the ranks, becoming a key player for Roma's Primavera (youth) team, which won the Italian Primavera championship in the 2019–20, 2020–21 and 2021–22 seasons.

== Club career ==
Ferrara made her professional debut with AS Roma's senior team in 2022, featuring in the Coppa Italia and Serie A matches. She made her debut for Roma's first team in February in the Coppa Italia match against Como Women, which the Giallorosse won 3–0, coming on as a substitute for Andressa Alves.

In January 2023, she transferred to Sassuolo Calcio, where she played until December 2023.

Ferrara joined Ternana Calcio Women for the final part of the season 2023–2024, then she signed with Genoa CFC Women on loan. After a successful season, in which Genoa got promoted from Serie B to Serie A and Anastasia scored 3 goals, she returned to Genoa on a permanent basis in July 2025, signing a contract until June 2028.

7 February 2026, she scored her first Serie A goal ever, during the defeat against Lazio (Genoa-Lazio 2-5).

== International career ==
Ferrara has represented Italy at various youth levels, including the U-17 and U-19 national teams. She was part of the squad for the 2022 UEFA Women's Under-19 Championship. Moreover, she played and scored during the qualification phase, for example in the match against Bosnia and Herzegovina (6–0), where she made her only goal with U-19.

== Achievements ==
Of the three league titles won with Roma Primavera, two were achieved by winning every match of the season (2019–2020, 2020–2021). No other Italian women's Primavera club has ever managed to win all games in two different seasons.

== Career statistics ==
As of 21 May 2026

Appearances and goals by club, season and competition
Club	Season	League			National cup (Note: Coppa Italia)		League cup (Note: Serie A Women's Cup)		Continental (Note: UEFA Women's Champions League)		Other (Note: Serie B promotion play-off)		Total	
Club	Season	Division	Apps	Goals	Apps	Goals	Apps	Goals	Apps	Goals	Apps	Goals	Apps	Goals
Roma	2021–22	Serie A	1	0	1	0	—		—		—		2	0
Roma	2022–23	Serie A	0	0	1	0	—		1	0	—		2	0
Roma	2023–24	Serie A	0	0	0	0	—		0	0	—		0	0
Roma	2024–25	Serie A	0	0	0	0	—		0	0	—		0	0
Roma	Total		1	0	2	0	—		1	0	—		4	0
Sassuolo (loan)	2022–23	Serie A	1	0	0	0	—		—		—		1	0
Sassuolo (loan)	2023–24	Serie A	2	0	0	0	—		—		—		2	0
Sassuolo (loan)	Total		3	0	0	0	—		—		—		3	0
Ternana (loan)	2023–24	Serie B	18	0	—		—		—		2	0	20	0
Genoa (loan)	2024–25	Serie B	28	3	1	0	—		—		—		29	3
Genoa	2025–26	Serie A	11	1	2	0	3	0	—		—		16	1
Career total			61	4	5	0	3	0	1	0	2	0	72	4

== Honours ==
Roma

- Campionato Primavera 2019/2020
- Campionato Primavera 2020/2021
- Campionato Primavera 2021/2022
