= Luna Vanzeir =

Belgian footballer

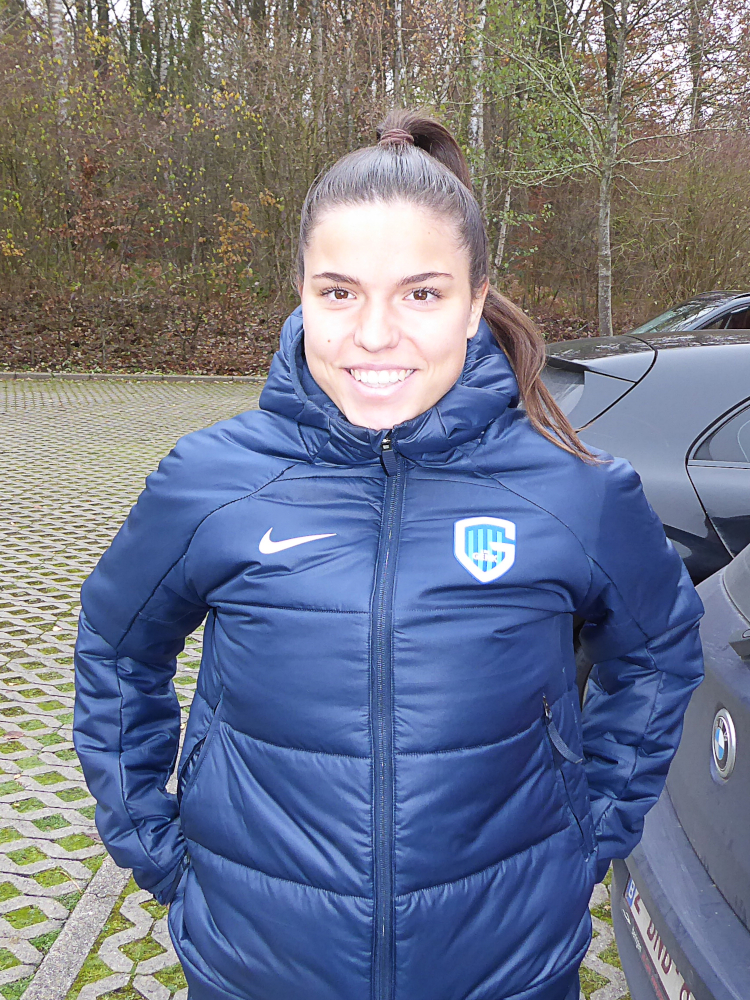
- Vanzeir in 2022

Personal information
- Date of birth: 7 January 2003 (age 23)
- Place of birth: Belgium
- Positions: Midfielder; forward

Team information
- Current team: Werder Bremen
- Number: 13

Senior career*
Years	Team	Apps	(Gls)
2019–2022	OH Leuven	51	(17)
2022–2024	Genk	56	(15)
2024–2026	Anderlecht	59	(24)
2026–	Werder Bremen	11	(4)

International career^{‡}
2021–	Belgium	7	(0)
- * Club domestic league appearances and goals as of 21 November 2026 ‡ National team caps and goals as of 15 October 2026 (UTC)

Luna Vanzeir (born 7 January 2003) is a Belgian professional footballer who plays as a forward and midfielder for Frauen-Bundesliga club Werder Bremen and the Belgium national team.

== International career ==
Vanzeir made her debut for the Belgium national team on 12 June 2021, coming on as a substitute for Jassina Blom against Luxembourg.

== Personal life ==
Vanzeir is of Polish and Ukrainian descent through her mother. She is the sister of New York Red Bulls and Belgium national team forward, Dante Vanzeir.
