= Yuliia Khrystiuk =

Ukrainian footballer and futsal player

Personal information
- Full name: Yuliia Viktorivna Khrystiuk
- Date of birth: 7 April 2003 (age 23)
- Height: 1.68 m (5 ft 6 in)
- Position: Forward

Team information
- Current team: Hibernian
- Number: 11

Youth career
- Integral Vinnytsia
- ODYUSSH Blokhina-Byelanova

College career
Years	Team	Apps	(Gls)
2020–2024	Old Dominion Monarchs	65	(5)

Senior career*
Years	Team	Apps	(Gls)
2018–2021	EMS-Podillia	20+	(10+)
2018–2020	Chornomorets Odesa (futsal)		
2020–2021	ZH-CYSS-1 Khmelnytskyi (futsal)		
2022–2025	Asheville City	17	(2)
2026–	Hibernian	1	(1)

International career^{‡}
2018–2019	Ukraine U17	6	(0)
2019–	Ukraine	7	(1)
- * Club domestic league appearances and goals as of 12 November 2021. ‡ National team caps and goals as of 27 October 2020.

Yuliia Viktorivna Khrystiuk (Ukrainian: Юлія Вікторівна Христюк; born 7 April 2003) is a Ukrainian footballer who plays as a forward for Scottish Women's Premier League team Hibernian and the Ukraine women's national team.

== Early life ==
Khrystiuk was raised in Vinnytsia, Ukraine.

== College career ==
Khrystiuk attended the Old Dominion University in the United States. She credits national teammate Nicole Kozlova and her family for helping her to get to the U.S. Khrystiuk missed the 2023 season due to an ACL tear.

== Club career ==
Khrystiuk has played for EMS-Podillia in Ukraine.

On 31 July 2026, Khrystiuk signed for SWPL side Hibernian on a two-year-deal.

== International career ==
In October 2019, Khrystiuk, age 17, made her senior international debut for Ukraine in Euro 2022 qualifying. She scored her first goal for the senior side in 2022.
