= Ana Milchevska =

Macedonian footballer

Personal information
- Date of birth: 23 August 2003 (age 23)
- Position: Defender

International career^{‡}
Years	Team	Apps	(Gls)
2018–2019	North Macedonia U-17	6	(0)
2021	North Macedonia U-19	3	(0)
2021–	North Macedonia	4	(0)
- ‡ National team caps and goals as of 19:41, 4 April 2023 (UTC)

Ana Milchevska (born 23 August 2003) is a Macedonian footballer who plays as a defender for the North Macedonia national team.

== International career ==
Milchevska made her debut for the North Macedonia national team on 25 November 2021, against Northern Ireland.
