= Bergensavisen =

Norwegian newspaper

Coordinates: 60°23′36.16″N 5°19′22.16″E

- Type: Daily newspaper
- Format: Tabloid (Compact)
- Owner: Amedia
- Editor: Rune Ulvik
- Founded: 1927, although there were predecessors
- Political alignment: None (traditionally Social Democrat)
- Language: Norwegian Bokmål
- Headquarters: Bergen, Norway
- Website: www.ba.no

Bergensavisen (lit. "the Bergen newspaper"), usually shortened to BA, is the second largest newspaper in Bergen, Norway. The paper is published in tabloid format. The newspaper's webpage ba.no is Bergen's largest local newspaper webpage.

In 2006, Bergensavisen had a daily circulation of 30,719 on Monday to Saturday, and 29,782 on Sundays. Approximately 108,000 read the paper every day.

== Pre-history ==
Bergensavisen had a predecessor in Arbeidervennen, founded by the Danish trade unionist Sophus Pihl in 1885. When he died in 1888, a group of trade unionists and idealists continued his work. The newspaper Arbeidet, started as a daily in December 1893. They sold their newspaper to Bergens Arbeiderparti, the local affiliation of the Norwegian Labour Party in 1905. However, the Labour Party went through two party splits in the 1920s. As the Labour Party joined Comintern in 1919, a group broke away in 1921 to form the Social Democratic Labour Party. This group founded a new newspaper Bergens Social-Demokrat in 1922. The next year, the Labour Party left Comintern. As a result, the pro-Comintern faction broke away to form the Communist Party. In the city of Bergen, the communists controlled the local Labour Party chapter Bergens Arbeiderparti, and its newspaper Arbeidet. When the social democrats had lost the power struggle, the victorious communists changed the journalism of their newspaper from social democracy to communism in 1922, erased the local news and published long political articles, chasing their readers away from the newspaper.

The few remaining Labour activists were left without a newspaper. Bergen Labour Party tried to run a newspaper called Bergens Arbeiderblad formerly, but it only existed from 11 April 1924 till October 1924. In 1927, the Social Democratic Labour Party reconciled with the Labour Party, and the two parties again became one. At the same time, a new newspaper Bergens Arbeiderblad was founded on the base of Bergens Social-Demokrat. 1927 is considered the official founding year of BA. The seven men commissioned to start the newspaper, also started the new Labour Party of Bergen, called Bergens Forenede Arbeiderparti.

Three years later, they had bigger circulation than Arbeidet. Arbeidet closed in 1948.

== History ==
Bergens Arbeiderblad eventually became larger than Arbeidet, and instead started competing with Bergens Tidende, which was dominant in the city. Bergens Arbeiderblad was stopped by the Nazi authorities in February 1941 during the German occupation of Norway, chief editor Oscar Ihlebæk was sent to a German concentration camp, where he died just after the camp was liberated by the Allied forces in May 1945. It resumed operations after the war. BA added a Sunday edition in August 1990, changed name to Bergensavisen in August 1992 and started one of the first online newspapers in Norway in January 1996.
