= Lyndsey Van Belle =

Belgian footballer

Personal information
- Date of birth: 31 August 2003 (age 23)
- Place of birth: Belgium
- Height: 1.62 m (5 ft 4 in)
- Position: Defender

Team information
- Current team: Genk

Senior career*
Years	Team	Apps	(Gls)
2020–2022	Gent	45	(7)
2022-2023	Club YLA	26	(3)
2023–	Genk	0	(0)

International career^{‡}
2021–	Belgium	1	(0)
- * Club domestic league appearances and goals as of 16 July 2023 (UTC) ‡ National team caps and goals as of 13:14, 5 September 2021 (UTC)

Lyndsey Van Belle (born 31 August 2003) is a Belgian footballer who plays as a defender for Genk in Belgian Women's Super League and the Belgium national team.

== International career ==
Van Belle made her debut for the Belgium national team on 12 June 2021, against Luxembourg.

== Personal life ==
Van Belle's elder sister, Shari, is also a footballer.
