= 2019 UEFA Women's Under-19 Championship qualification =

Tournament details
- Dates: Qualifying round: 28 August – 9 October 2018; Elite round: 3–9 April 2019
- Teams: 50 (from 1 confederation)

Tournament statistics
- Matches played: 114
- Goals scored: 508 (4.46 per match)
- Top scorer: (Germany) Sjoeke Nüsken (12 goals)

The 2019 UEFA Women's Under-19 Championship qualifying competition was a women's under-19 football competition that determined the seven teams joining the automatically qualified hosts Scotland in the 2019 UEFA Women's Under-19 Championship final tournament.

Apart from Scotland, 50 of the remaining 54 UEFA member national teams entered the qualifying competition. Players born on or after 1 January 2000 were eligible to participate. Starting from this season, up to five substitutions are permitted per team in each match.

== Format ==
The qualifying competition consisted of two rounds:

- Qualifying round: Apart from Spain and France, which received byes to the elite round as the teams with the highest seeding coefficient, the remaining 48 teams were drawn into 12 groups of four teams. Each group played a single round-robin, with one of the teams selected as hosts after the draw. The 12 group winners, the 12 runners-up, and the two third-placed teams with the best record against the first and second-placed teams in their group advanced to the elite round.
- Elite round: 28 teams were drawn into seven groups of four teams. Each group played a single round-robin, with one of the teams selected as hosts after the draw. The seven group winners qualified for the final tournament.

=== Tiebreakers ===
For the qualifying round and elite round, teams were ranked according to points (3 points for a win, 1 point for a draw, 0 points for a loss), and if tied on points, the following tiebreaking criteria were to be applied, in the order given, to determine the rankings (Regulations Articles 14.01 and 14.02):

1. Points in head-to-head matches among tied teams;
2. Goal difference in head-to-head matches among tied teams;
3. Goals scored in head-to-head matches among tied teams;
4. If more than two teams were tied, and after applying all head-to-head criteria above, a subset of teams were still tied, all head-to-head criteria above were reapplied exclusively to this subset of teams;
5. Goal difference in all group matches;
6. Goals scored in all group matches;
7. Penalty shoot-out if only two teams had the same number of points, and they met in the last round of the group and were tied after applying all criteria above (not used if more than two teams had the same number of points, or if their rankings were not relevant for qualification for the next stage);
8. Disciplinary points (red card = 3 points, yellow card = 1 point, expulsion for two yellow cards in one match = 3 points);
9. UEFA coefficient for the qualifying round draw;
10. Drawing of lots.

To determine the two best third-placed teams from the qualifying round, the results against the teams in fourth place were discarded. The following criteria were applied (Regulations Article 15.01):

1. Points;
2. Goal difference;
3. Goals scored;
4. Disciplinary points;
5. UEFA coefficient for the qualifying round draw;
6. Drawing of lots.

== Qualifying round ==
=== Draw ===
The draw for the qualifying round was held on 24 November 2017, 10:00 CET (UTC+1), at the UEFA headquarters in Nyon, Switzerland.

The teams were seeded according to their coefficient ranking, calculated based on the following (a four-year window was used instead of the previous three-year window):

- 2014 UEFA Women's Under-19 Championship final tournament and qualifying competition (qualifying round and elite round)
- 2015 UEFA Women's Under-19 Championship final tournament and qualifying competition (qualifying round and elite round)
- 2016 UEFA Women's Under-19 Championship final tournament and qualifying competition (qualifying round and elite round)
- 2017 UEFA Women's Under-19 Championship final tournament and qualifying competition (qualifying round and elite round)

Each group contained one team from Pot A, one team from Pot B, one team from Pot C, and one team from Pot D. For political reasons, Russia and Ukraine, Armenia and Azerbaijan, Serbia and Kosovo, and Bosnia and Herzegovina and Kosovo would not be drawn in the same group.

Final tournament hosts
Team	Coeff	Rank
**Scotland**	16.111	—

Bye to elite round
Team	Coeff	Rank
**Spain**	31.833	1
**France**	26.000	2

Teams entering qualifying round

Pot A
Team	Coeff	Rank
**Netherlands**	24.833	3
**Germany**	21.833	4
Sweden	20.111	5
**Norway**	19.000	6
**England**	16.167	7
Switzerland	15.444	8
**Belgium**	14.167	9
Republic of Ireland	13.889	10
Denmark	13.833	11
Finland	12.667	12
Italy	12.444	13
Russia	11.000	14

Pot B
Team	Coeff	Rank
Austria	11.000	15
Czech Republic	10.333	16
Portugal	10.167	17
Poland	8.667	18
Northern Ireland	8.000	19
Serbia	8.167	20
Iceland	7.833	21
Turkey	7.167	22
Ukraine	7.000	23
Hungary	6.833	24
Slovenia	6.667	25
Slovakia	6.667	26

Pot C
Team	Coeff	Rank
Romania	6.333	27
Belarus	5.667	28
Croatia	5.333	29
Azerbaijan	5.000	30
Greece	5.000	31
Bosnia and Herzegovina	4.333	32
Israel	4.000	33
Wales	2.667	34
Moldova	2.667	35
Faroe Islands	2.333	36
Montenegro	1.333	37
Estonia	1.333	38

Pot D
Team	Coeff	Rank
Macedonia	1.333	39
Bulgaria	1.000	40
Albania	1.000	41
Cyprus	0.667	42
Malta	0.667	43
Georgia	0.000	44
Lithuania	0.000	45
Kazakhstan	0.000	46
Latvia	0.000	47
Armenia	0.000	48
Liechtenstein	—	49
Kosovo	—	50

Notes

- Teams marked in **bold** have qualified for the final tournament.

Did not enter
Andorra	Gibraltar	Luxembourg	San Marino

=== Groups ===
The qualifying round must be played by 28 October 2018, and on the following FIFA International Match Calendar dates unless all four teams agree to play on another date:

- 27 August – 4 September 2018
- 1–9 October 2018

Times are CEST (UTC+2), as listed by UEFA (local times, if different, are in parentheses).

==== Group 1 ====
Pos	Team	Pld	W	D	L	GF	GA	GD	Pts	Qualification
1	England	3	3	0	0	21	0	+21	**9**	Elite round
2	Slovakia	3	2	0	1	12	5	+7	**6**	Elite round
3	Malta	3	0	1	2	1	15	−14	**1**	
4	Croatia (H)	3	0	1	2	0	14	−14	**1**	

Source: UEFA
Rules for classification: Qualification tiebreakers
(H) Hosts
1 October 2018
11:00

England	9–0	Malta
Palmer 32', 45'; Morgan 38'; Naz 44', 74', 81'; Ravenscroft 62'; Rodgers 85'; Park 88'	Report

SRC Trate, Nedelišće
Attendance: 70
Referee: Galiya Echeva (Bulgaria)
1 October 2018
15:30

Croatia	0–6	Slovakia
	Report	Bieliková 17'; Bogorová 18', 54'; Žemberyová 65'; Kaláberová 75'; Niňajová 78'

Stadion NK Podravina, Ludbreg
Attendance: 80
Referee: Tess Olofsson (Sweden)

4 October 2018
11:00

Slovakia	6–1	Malta
Žemberyová 27'; Lemešová 45+1' (pen.); Kratochvílová 70'; Dianišková 75'; Niňajová 84'; Droppová 89'	Report	Barbara 81'

Stadion NK Podravina, Ludbreg
Attendance: 50
Referee: Tess Olofsson (Sweden)
4 October 2018
15:30

England	8–0	Croatia
Palmer 10', 38' (pen.); Park 24', 40', 47', 54'; Griffin 35'; Domingo 90+3'	Report

SRC Trate, Nedelišće
Attendance: 130
Referee: Barbara Poxhofer (Austria)

7 October 2018
11:00

Slovakia	0–4	England
	Report	Fitzgerald 2'; Lemešová 57' (o.g.); Ravenscroft 75', 90+4'

SRC Trate, Nedelišće
Attendance: 40
Referee: Barbara Poxhofer (Austria)
7 October 2018
11:00

Malta	0–0	Croatia
	Report

Stadion NK Podravina, Ludbreg
Attendance: 200
Referee: Galiya Echeva (Bulgaria)

==== Group 2 ====
Pos	Team	Pld	W	D	L	GF	GA	GD	Pts	Qualification
1	Switzerland	3	3	0	0	17	0	+17	**9**	Elite round
2	Turkey (H)	3	2	0	1	5	6	−1	**6**	Elite round
3	Azerbaijan	3	1	0	2	2	6	−4	**3**	
4	Cyprus	3	0	0	3	2	14	−12	**0**	

Source: UEFA
Rules for classification: Qualification tiebreakers
(H) Hosts
3 October 2018
12:00 (13:00 TRT)

Switzerland	9–0	Cyprus
Bischof 5'; Fölmli 6'; Enz 34'; Zaugg 43'; Waeber 51', 75', 77'; Messerli 65', 90'	Report

Arslan Zeki Demirci Sports Complex 2, Manavgat
Referee: Valentina Finzi (Italy)
3 October 2018
15:30 (16:30 TRT)

Azerbaijan	0–2	Turkey
	Report	Öztürk 39', 62'

Arslan Zeki Demirci Sports Complex 1, Manavgat
Referee: Frida Nielsen (Denmark)

6 October 2018
12:00 (13:00 TRT)

Switzerland	3–0	Azerbaijan
Waeber 50', 69' (pen.), 90'	Report

Arslan Zeki Demirci Sports Complex 2, Manavgat
Referee: Lois Otte (Belgium)
6 October 2018
15:30 (16:30 TRT)

Turkey	3–1	Cyprus
İncik 32'; Sadıkoğlu 36'; Eren 87'	Report	Antoniou 69'

Arslan Zeki Demirci Sports Complex 1, Manavgat
Referee: Frida Nielsen (Denmark)

9 October 2018
15:30 (16:30 TRT)

Turkey	0–5	Switzerland
	Report	Buser 15'; Fölmli 17', 64', 82'; Piubel 84'

Arslan Zeki Demirci Sports Complex 1, Manavgat
Referee: Lois Otte (Belgium)
9 October 2018
15:30 (16:30 TRT)

Cyprus	1–2	Azerbaijan
S. Antoniou 25'	Report	Seyfatdinova 34'; Gurgenidze 35'

Arslan Zeki Demirci Sports Complex 2, Manavgat
Referee: Valentina Finzi (Italy)

==== Group 3 ====
Pos	Team	Pld	W	D	L	GF	GA	GD	Pts	Qualification
1	Slovenia	3	3	0	0	16	0	+16	**9**	Elite round
2	Sweden (H)	3	2	0	1	8	2	+6	**6**	Elite round
3	Israel	3	1	0	2	5	4	+1	**3**	
4	Kazakhstan	3	0	0	3	1	24	−23	**0**	

Source: UEFA
Rules for classification: Qualification tiebreakers
(H) Hosts
3 October 2018
14:00

Israel	0–1	Slovenia
	Report	Korošec 33' (pen.)

Vejby IP, Vejbystrand
Referee: Justina Lavrenovaitė (Lithuania)
3 October 2018
16:00

Sweden	6–0	Kazakhstan
Kapocs 28', 54'; Orynbassarova 57' (o.g.); Olsson 70'; Jontoft 87'; Klingwall 90+3'	Report

Harlyckans IP, Helsingborg
Referee: Lizzy van der Helm (Netherlands)

6 October 2018
14:00

Sweden	2–1	Israel
Engström 21', 72'	Report	Michaeli 53'

Vejby IP, Vejbystrand
Referee: Eleni Antoniou (Greece)
6 October 2018
14:00

Slovenia	14–0	Kazakhstan
Makovec 7', 16'; Pintarič 24', 40', 49', 76', 80'; Mori 45+1', 47'; Milovič 51'; Vindišar 81', 90+1'; Potočnik 90'; Korošec 90+2'	Report

Vittsjö IP, Vittsjö
Referee: Justina Lavrenovaitė (Lithuania)

9 October 2018
18:30

Slovenia	1–0	Sweden
Makovec 77'	Report

Vittsjö IP, Vittsjö
Referee: Eleni Antoniou (Greece)
9 October 2018
18:30

Kazakhstan	1–4	Israel
Orynbassarova 88'	Report	Revaha 5', 36'; Elinav 23' (pen.), 49'

Olympia, Helsingborg
Referee: Lizzy van der Helm (Netherlands)

==== Group 4 ====
Pos	Team	Pld	W	D	L	GF	GA	GD	Pts	Qualification
1	Norway	3	3	0	0	22	0	+22	**9**	Elite round
2	Czech Republic	3	2	0	1	9	5	+4	**6**	Elite round
3	Bosnia and Herzegovina (H)	3	1	0	2	1	12	−11	**3**	
4	Georgia	3	0	0	3	0	15	−15	**0**	

Source: UEFA
Rules for classification: Qualification tiebreakers
(H) Hosts
2 October 2018
15:00

Norway	7–0	Georgia
Ildhusøy 3'; Sunde 14'; Jøsendal 25'; Rogde 49', 52'; Hørte 59'; Blakstad 87'	Report

Novi Gradski Stadion, Ugljevik
Referee: Rasa Imanalijeva (Lithuania)
2 October 2018
15:00

Bosnia and Herzegovina	0–2	Czech Republic
	Report	Cvrčková 66'; Novotná 79'

Stadion Etno Selo Stanišići, Bijeljina
Referee: Reelika Turi (Estonia)

5 October 2018
15:00

Norway	10–0	Bosnia and Herzegovina
Sunde 10', 77', 85'; Nygård 24', 35'; Blakstad 45'; Rogde 72', 76', 82'; Fornes 89'	Report

Stadion Etno Selo Stanišići, Bijeljina
Referee: Ewa Augustyn (Poland)
5 October 2018
15:00

Czech Republic	7–0	Georgia
Krejčířová 9'; Pochmanová 10'; Cvrčková 14'; Dvořáková 36'; Illešová 39'; Komárková 49'; Sonntagová 58'	Report

Novi Gradski Stadion, Ugljevik
Referee: Reelika Turi (Estonia)

8 October 2018
15:00

Czech Republic	0–5	Norway
	Report	Sunde 14' (pen.); Bjelde 20'; Blakstad 23'; Ildhusøy 33'; Olsen 82'

Stadion Etno Selo Stanišići, Bijeljina
Referee: Ewa Augustyn (Poland)
8 October 2018
15:00

Georgia	0–1	Bosnia and Herzegovina
	Report	Damjanović 42'

Novi Gradski Stadion, Ugljevik
Referee: Rasa Imanalijeva (Lithuania)

==== Group 5 ====
Pos	Team	Pld	W	D	L	GF	GA	GD	Pts	Qualification
1	Finland	3	3	0	0	19	0	+19	**9**	Elite round
2	Hungary (H)	3	2	0	1	15	7	+8	**6**	Elite round
3	Macedonia	3	1	0	2	4	15	−11	**3**	
4	Moldova	3	0	0	3	1	17	−16	**0**	

Source: UEFA
Rules for classification: Qualification tiebreakers
(H) Hosts
3 October 2018
15:30

Finland	5–0	Macedonia
Polozhani 2' (o.g.); Tuominen 21', 42'; Siren 48'; Portaankorva 70'	Report

Városi Stadion, Dabas
Referee: Triinu Laos (Estonia)
3 October 2018
15:30

Moldova	0–6	Hungary
	Report	Pusztai 17'; Farkas 20', 45'; Kovács 24' (pen.); Pintye 45+2'; Bódai 50'

Üllői Városi Sporttelep, Üllő
Referee: Shona Shukrula (Netherlands)

6 October 2018
15:30

Finland	7–0	Moldova
Portaankorva 18'; Kilponen 41'; Tuominen 52', 60'; Siren 64' (pen.), 74'; Mankki 86'	Report

Városi Stadion, Dabas
Referee: Hristiana Guteva (Bulgaria)
6 October 2018
15:30

Hungary	9–0	Macedonia
Bódai 45', 68', 79', 86', 90+1'; Farkas 52'; Kovács 57'; Vachter 64'; Pusztai 71'	Report

Üllői Városi Sporttelep, Üllő
Referee: Shona Shukrula (Netherlands)

9 October 2018
15:30

Hungary	0–7	Finland
	Report	Siponen 1'; Vuorinen 48'; Tuominen 69', 72'; Siren 79'; Portaankorva 80'; Leppioja 90+1'

Üllői Városi Sporttelep, Üllő
Referee: Hristiana Guteva (Bulgaria)
9 October 2018
15:30

Macedonia	4–1	Moldova
Dimoska 6', 23', 71'; Belistojanoska 70'	Report	Terentiev 13'

Városi Stadion, Dabas
Referee: Triinu Laos (Estonia)

==== Group 6 ====
Pos	Team	Pld	W	D	L	GF	GA	GD	Pts	Qualification
1	Denmark	3	3	0	0	19	0	+19	**9**	Elite round
2	Serbia	3	1	1	1	15	5	+10	**4**	Elite round
3	Greece	3	1	1	1	3	3	0	**4**	Elite round
4	Liechtenstein (H)	3	0	0	3	0	29	−29	**0**	

Source: UEFA
Rules for classification: Qualification tiebreakers
(H) Hosts
28 August 2018
12:00

Greece	0–0	Serbia
	Report

Freizeitpark Widau, Ruggell
Referee: Briet Bragadottir (Iceland)
28 August 2018
18:00

Denmark	11–0	Liechtenstein
Hasbo 9', 27', 45+1'; Holdt 22'; Thomsen 34'; Svava 39'; Pedersen 47', 54', 63'; Johansen 57'; Hasemi 68'	Report

Freizeitpark Widau, Ruggell
Referee: Veronika Kovarova (Czech Republic)

31 August 2018
12:00

Denmark	3–0	Greece
Pedersen 47', 67'; Snerle 85'	Report

Sportanlage Blumenau, Triesen
Referee: Laura Rapp (Sweden)
31 August 2018
18:00

Serbia	15–0	Liechtenstein
Krstić 8'; Trbojević 31', 47', 48', 71'; Barjaktarović 39', 45+1'; Frajtović 41', 54'; Mostarac 58'; Plavšić 62'; Maksimović 66', 90+3'; Savanović 69'; Lohner 73' (o.g.)	Report

Sportanlage Blumenau, Triesen
Referee: Briet Bragadottir (Iceland)

3 September 2018
18:00

Serbia	0–5	Denmark
	Report	Hasemi 15'; Holdt 70'; Pedersen 76', 84', 90+2'

Sportpark Eschen-Mauren, Eschen
Referee: Laura Rapp (Sweden)
3 September 2018
18:00

Liechtenstein	0–3	Greece
	Report	Pouliou 66'; Gatoudi 68'; Proxenou 78'

Freizeitpark Widau, Ruggell
Referee: Veronika Kovarova (Czech Republic)

==== Group 7 ====
Pos	Team	Pld	W	D	L	GF	GA	GD	Pts	Qualification
1	Austria (H)	3	3	0	0	14	1	+13	**9**	Elite round
2	Russia	3	2	0	1	7	3	+4	**6**	Elite round
3	Latvia	3	0	1	2	2	8	−6	**1**	
4	Montenegro	3	0	1	2	1	12	−11	**1**	

Source: UEFA
Rules for classification: Qualification tiebreakers
(H) Hosts
2 October 2018
11:30

Montenegro	0–8	Austria
	Report	Brunnthaler 3', 5'; Großgasteiger 9'; Kolb 22', 55'; Höbinger 28' (pen.), 90+4'; Bereuter 59'

DANA Arena, Windischgarsten
Attendance: 115
Referee: Catarina Campos (Portugal)
2 October 2018
18:30

Russia	4–0	Latvia
Dergousova 10'; Brigmane 15' (o.g.); Organova 20' (pen.), 29'	Report

Huber Arena, Wels
Attendance: 30
Referee: Rachel Cohen (Israel)

5 October 2018
11:30

Russia	3–0	Montenegro
Dergousova 23', 81'; Organova 58'	Report

DANA Arena, Windischgarsten
Attendance: 25
Referee: Ivana Projkovska (Macedonia)
5 October 2018
18:30

Austria	3–1	Latvia
Höbinger 8' (pen.), 90+7'; Großgasteiger 23'	Report	Krasnova 30'

Huber Arena, Wels
Attendance: 150
Referee: Catarina Campos (Portugal)

8 October 2018
16:00

Austria	3–0	Russia
Degen 44'; Dordic 60'; Plattner 66'	Report

Huber Arena, Wels
Attendance: 150
Referee: Ivana Projkovska (Macedonia)
8 October 2018
16:00

Latvia	1–1	Montenegro
Miksone 59'	Report	Vujadinovic 90+2' (pen.)

DANA Arena, Windischgarsten
Attendance: 20
Referee: Rachel Cohen (Israel)

==== Group 8 ====
Pos	Team	Pld	W	D	L	GF	GA	GD	Pts	Qualification
1	Republic of Ireland	3	3	0	0	13	0	+13	**9**	Elite round
2	Ukraine	3	2	0	1	6	3	+3	**6**	Elite round
3	Lithuania (H)	3	1	0	2	1	9	−8	**3**	
4	Faroe Islands	3	0	0	3	0	8	−8	**0**	

Source: UEFA
Rules for classification: Qualification tiebreakers
(H) Hosts
2 October 2018
14:00 (15:00 EEST)

Faroe Islands	0–4	Ukraine
	Report	Semenyuk 2'; Bilokur 14', 44'; Lukach 19'

Sūduva Stadium, Marijampolė
Referee: Veronika Kovarova (Czech Republic)
2 October 2018
17:00 (18:00 EEST)

Republic of Ireland	7–0	Lithuania
Payne 31', 50'; McEvoy 38'; Atkinson 42'; Ruddy 46'; Singleton 65'; McManus 86'	Report

Alytus Stadium, Alytus
Referee: Ruzanna Petrosyan (Armenia)

5 October 2018
14:00 (15:00 EEST)

Republic of Ireland	3–0	Faroe Islands
Singleton 25'; Payne 70'; McEvoy 75'	Report

Sūduva Stadium, Marijampolė
Referee: Elvira Nurmustafina (Kazakhstan)
5 October 2018
17:00 (18:00 EEST)

Ukraine	2–0	Lithuania
Nikitiuk 8'; Semenyuk 60'	Report

Alytus Stadium, Alytus
Referee: Veronika Kovarova (Czech Republic)

8 October 2018
15:00 (16:00 EEST)

Ukraine	0–3	Republic of Ireland
	Report	Lobato 12'; McEvoy 80'; Ruddy 87'

Sūduva Stadium, Marijampolė
Referee: Elvira Nurmustafina (Kazakhstan)
8 October 2018
15:00 (16:00 EEST)

Lithuania	1–0	Faroe Islands
Kurapatkina 37'	Report

Alytus Stadium, Alytus
Referee: Ruzanna Petrosyan (Armenia)

==== Group 9 ====
Pos	Team	Pld	W	D	L	GF	GA	GD	Pts	Qualification
1	Germany	3	3	0	0	34	0	+34	**9**	Elite round
2	Northern Ireland (H)	3	1	1	1	7	8	−1	**4**	Elite round
3	Kosovo	3	1	1	1	5	7	−2	**4**	
4	Estonia	3	0	0	3	2	33	−31	**0**	

Source: UEFA
Rules for classification: Qualification tiebreakers
(H) Hosts
2 October 2018
15:00 (14:00 BST)

Germany	6–0	Kosovo
Krumbiegel 34'; Kössler 47', 61'; Nüsken 48'; Wieder 55'; Cal 71'	Report

Stangmore Park, Dungannon
Referee: Andromachi Tsiofliki (Greece)
2 October 2018
20:00 (19:00 BST)

Estonia	1–7	Northern Ireland
Šilina 22'	Report	Deane 16'; Collighan 38', 87'; Bell 56'; Burrows 68'; McDaniel 70'; Canavan 90+3'

Shamrock Park, Portadown
Referee: Zuzana Valentová (Slovakia)

5 October 2018
15:00 (14:00 BST)

Germany	21–0	Estonia
Chmielinski 8', 22', 55'; Schmidt 10'; Nüsken 13', 20', 24', 39', 59', 64'; Anyomi 15'; Krumbiegel 35', 44'; Müller 60'; Kössler 62'; Meyer 75'; Ebert 78', 80', 84', 90+1'; Uebach 83'	Report

Stangmore Park, Dungannon
Referee: Maria Marotta (Italy)
5 October 2018
20:00 (19:00 BST)

Northern Ireland	0–0	Kosovo
	Report

Shamrock Park, Portadown
Referee: Zuzana Valentová (Slovakia)

8 October 2018
14:00 (13:00 BST)

Northern Ireland	0–7	Germany
	Report	Krumbiegel 9', 50'; Nüsken 15', 31', 90+3'; Müller 18', 90'

Shamrock Park, Portadown
Referee: Maria Marotta (Italy)
8 October 2018
14:00 (13:00 BST)

Kosovo	5–1	Estonia
Aslanaj 12', 66'; Talts 24' (o.g.); Musaj 42'; Biqkaj 76'	Report	Satsi 18'

The Showgrounds, Coleraine
Referee: Andromachi Tsiofliki (Greece)

==== Group 10 ====
Pos	Team	Pld	W	D	L	GF	GA	GD	Pts	Qualification
1	Netherlands (H)	3	3	0	0	19	0	+19	**9**	Elite round
2	Poland	3	2	0	1	3	3	0	**6**	Elite round
3	Albania	3	1	0	2	3	14	−11	**3**	
4	Belarus	3	0	0	3	1	9	−8	**0**	

Source: UEFA
Rules for classification: Qualification tiebreakers
(H) Hosts
3 October 2018
15:00

Belarus	0–2	Poland
	Report	Sirant 69'; Tylak 78'

Sportpark Zuid, Groesbeek
Referee: Irena Velevačkoska (Macedonia)
3 October 2018
19:00

Netherlands	12–0	Albania
Casparij 43', 52', 55'; Leuchter 45+1', 49', 51', 84'; Hilhorst 54'; Carleer 61'; Grant 63'; Van de Westeringh 81'; Agalliu 90+3' (o.g.)	Report

Sportpark Parkzicht, Uden
Referee: Emilie Dokset (Norway)

6 October 2018
12:00

Poland	1–0	Albania
Tylak 90+3'	Report

Sportpark Parkzicht, Uden
Referee: Irena Velevačkoska (Macedonia)
6 October 2018
16:00

Netherlands	4–0	Belarus
Doorn 21'; Van de Westeringh 31'; Geraedts 72'; Leuchter 83' (pen.)	Report

Sportpark Zuid, Groesbeek
Referee: Marta Huerta De Aza (Spain)

9 October 2018
19:00

Poland	0–3	Netherlands
	Report	Wilms 7'; Smits 9'; Casparij 88'

Sportpark Parkzicht, Uden
Referee: Marta Huerta De Aza (Spain)
9 October 2018
19:00

Albania	3–1	Belarus
Lufo 5'; Begallo 42' (pen.); Halilaj 55'	Report	Olkhovik 8'

Sportpark Zuid, Groesbeek
Referee: Emilie Dokset (Norway)

==== Group 11 ====
Pos	Team	Pld	W	D	L	GF	GA	GD	Pts	Qualification
1	Italy	3	3	0	0	9	0	+9	**9**	Elite round
2	Portugal	3	1	1	1	4	3	+1	**4**	Elite round
3	Bulgaria (H)	3	1	1	1	3	6	−3	**4**	Elite round
4	Romania	3	0	0	3	0	7	−7	**0**	

Source: UEFA
Rules for classification: Qualification tiebreakers
(H) Hosts
1 October 2018
14:00 (15:00 EEST)

Romania	0–2	Portugal
	Report	Encarnação 53'; Teles 68'

Albena Stadium, Albena
Referee: Viola Raudziņa (Latvia)
1 October 2018
14:30 (15:30 EEST)

Italy	4–0	Bulgaria
Polli 34'; Bellucci 45+4' (pen.), 55'; Devoto 90+2'	Report

Balchik Stadium, Balchik
Referee: Nelli Stepanyan (Armenia)

4 October 2018
14:00 (15:00 EEST)

Italy	4–0	Romania
Bellucci 60', 85'; Greggi 71'; Ripamonti 80'	Report

Albena Stadium, Albena
Referee: Rebecca Welch (England)
4 October 2018
14:30 (15:30 EEST)

Portugal	2–2	Bulgaria
Duarte 9'; Encarnação 41'	Report	Dormushali 16', 75'

Balchik Stadium, Balchik
Referee: Viola Raudziņa (Latvia)

7 October 2018
14:00 (15:00 EEST)

Portugal	0–1	Italy
	Report	Puglisi 58'

Albena Stadium, Albena
Referee: Rebecca Welch (England)
7 October 2018
14:00 (15:00 EEST)

Bulgaria	1–0	Romania
Naydenova 45+1'	Report

Balchik Stadium, Balchik
Referee: Nelli Stepanyan (Armenia)

==== Group 12 ====
Pos	Team	Pld	W	D	L	GF	GA	GD	Pts	Qualification
1	Iceland	3	3	0	0	11	2	+9	**9**	Elite round
2	Belgium	3	2	0	1	9	6	+3	**6**	Elite round
3	Wales	3	1	0	2	8	5	+3	**3**	
4	Armenia (H)	3	0	0	3	0	15	−15	**0**	

Source: UEFA
Rules for classification: Qualification tiebreakers
(H) Hosts
2 October 2018
10:00 (12:00 AMT)

Belgium	5–0	Armenia
Buabadi 33', 50'; Dhondt 45+2', 81'; Geers 79'	Report

Yerevan Football Academy Stadium, Yerevan
Referee: Victoria Beyer (France)
2 October 2018
15:00 (17:00 AMT)

Wales	1–2	Iceland
Sibanda 59'	Report	Eiríksdóttir 54'; Jóhannsdóttir 58'

Yerevan Football Academy Stadium, Yerevan
Referee: Lucie Šulcová (Czech Republic)

5 October 2018
10:00 (12:00 AMT)

Iceland	4–0	Armenia
Ásþórsdóttir 39', 79'; Vilhjálmsdóttir 48'; Einarsdóttir 70'	Report

Yerevan Football Academy Stadium, Yerevan
Referee: Lucie Šulcová (Czech Republic)
5 October 2018
15:00 (17:00 AMT)

Belgium	3–1	Wales
Dhondt 2'; Petry 18'; De Groote 43'	Report	Vanaenrode 25' (o.g.)

Yerevan Football Academy Stadium, Yerevan
Referee: Graziella Pirriatore (Italy)

8 October 2018
12:00 (14:00 AMT)

Iceland	5–1	Belgium
Eiríksdóttir 19', 55'; Brackman 47' (o.g.); Jóhannsdóttir 70' (pen.); Jónsdóttir 90+1'	Report	Dhondt 90+4'

Banants Stadium, Yerevan
Referee: Graziella Pirriatore (Italy)
8 October 2018
12:00 (14:00 AMT)

Armenia	0–6	Wales
	Report	Horrell 29'; E. Hughes 45' (pen.); Jones 50'; Powell 53'; Pike 67'; J. Hughes 90+5'

Yerevan Football Academy Stadium, Yerevan
Referee: Victoria Beyer (France)

=== Ranking of third-placed teams ===
To determine the two best third-placed teams from the qualifying round which advance to the elite round, only the results of the third-placed teams against the first and second-placed teams in their group are taken into account.

Pos	Grp	Team	Pld	W	D	L	GF	GA	GD	Pts	Qualification
1	6	Greece	2	0	1	1	0	3	−3	1	Elite round
2	11	Bulgaria	2	0	1	1	2	6	−4	1	Elite round
3	9	Kosovo	2	0	1	1	0	6	−6	1	
4	3	Israel	2	0	0	2	1	3	−2	0	
5	12	Wales	2	0	0	2	2	5	−3	0	
6	2	Azerbaijan	2	0	0	2	0	5	−5	0	
7	7	Latvia	2	0	0	2	1	7	−6	0	
8	8	Lithuania	2	0	0	2	0	9	−9	0	
9	4	Bosnia and Herzegovina	2	0	0	2	0	12	−12	0	
10	10	Albania	2	0	0	2	0	13	−13	0	
11	1	Malta	2	0	0	2	1	15	−14	0	
12	5	Macedonia	2	0	0	2	0	14	−14	0	

Source: UEFA
Rules for classification: 1) points; 2) goal difference; 3) goals scored; 4) disciplinary points; 5) coefficient; 6) drawing of lots.

== Elite round ==
=== Draw ===
The draw for the elite round was held on 23 November 2018, 11:00 CET (UTC+1), at the UEFA headquarters in Nyon, Switzerland.

The teams were seeded according to their results in the qualifying round. Spain and France, which received byes to the elite round, were automatically seeded into Pot A. Each group contained one team from Pot A, one team from Pot B, one team from Pot C, and one team from Pot D. Winners and runners-up from the same qualifying round group could not be drawn in the same group, but the best third-placed teams could be drawn in the same group as winners or runners-up from the same qualifying round group.

Pos	Grp	Team	Pld	W	D	L	GF	GA	GD	Pts	Seeding
1	—	Spain	0	0	0	0	0	0	0	0	Pot A
2	—	France	0	0	0	0	0	0	0	0	Pot A
3	9	Germany	3	3	0	0	34	0	+34	9	Pot A
4	4	Norway	3	3	0	0	22	0	+22	9	Pot A
5	1	England	3	3	0	0	21	0	+21	9	Pot A
6	5	Finland	3	3	0	0	19	0	+19	9 (Note: Disciplinary points: Finland 1, Netherlands 2, Denmark 2; Coefficient ranking for qualifying round draw: Netherlands 3, Denmark 11.)	Pot A
7	10	Netherlands	3	3	0	0	19	0	+19	9	Pot A
8	6	Denmark	3	3	0	0	19	0	+19	9	Pot B
9	2	Switzerland	3	3	0	0	17	0	+17	9	Pot B
10	3	Slovenia	3	3	0	0	16	0	+16	9	Pot B
11	7	Austria	3	3	0	0	14	1	+13	9	Pot B
12	8	Republic of Ireland	3	3	0	0	13	0	+13	9	Pot B
13	12	Iceland	3	3	0	0	11	2	+9	9	Pot B
14	11	Italy	3	3	0	0	9	0	+9	9	Pot B
15	5	Hungary	3	2	0	1	15	7	+8	6	Pot C
16	1	Slovakia	3	2	0	1	12	5	+7	6	Pot C
17	3	Sweden	3	2	0	1	8	2	+6	6	Pot C
18	4	Czech Republic	3	2	0	1	9	5	+4	6	Pot C
19	7	Russia	3	2	0	1	7	3	+4	6	Pot C
20	12	Belgium	3	2	0	1	9	6	+3	6	Pot C
21	8	Ukraine	3	2	0	1	6	3	+3	6	Pot C
22	10	Poland	3	2	0	1	3	3	0	6	Pot D
23	2	Turkey	3	2	0	1	5	6	−1	6	Pot D
24	6	Serbia	3	1	1	1	15	5	+10	4	Pot D
25	11	Portugal	3	1	1	1	4	3	+1	4	Pot D
26	6	Greece (Y)	3	1	1	1	3	3	0	4	Pot D
27	9	Northern Ireland	3	1	1	1	7	8	−1	4	Pot D
28	11	Bulgaria (Y)	3	1	1	1	3	6	−3	4	Pot D

Source: UEFA
Rules for classification: 1) points; 2) goal difference; 3) goals scored; 4) disciplinary points; 5) coefficient; 6) drawing of lots.
(Y) Third-placed teams from qualifying round (may be drawn with teams from same qualifying round group)

=== Groups ===
The elite round is scheduled to be played on the following FIFA International Match Calendar dates unless all four teams agree to play on another date:

- 1–9 April 2019
- 10–18 June 2019

Times are CEST (UTC+2), as listed by UEFA (local times, if different, are in parentheses).

==== Group 1 ====
Pos	Team	Pld	W	D	L	GF	GA	GD	Pts	Qualification
1	Germany (H)	3	2	1	0	11	2	+9	7	Final tournament
2	Czech Republic	3	2	0	1	4	5	−1	6	
3	Austria	3	1	1	1	4	4	0	4	
4	Greece	3	0	0	3	0	8	−8	0	

Source: UEFA
Rules for classification: Qualification tiebreakers
(H) Hosts
3 April 2019
12:00

Germany	4–0	Greece
Nüsken 32'; Krumbiegel 43'; Fuso 65'; Chmielinski 75'	Report

Werner-Seelenbinder-Stadion, Luckenwalde
Referee: Shona Shukrula (Netherlands)
3 April 2019
18:00

Czech Republic	2–0	Austria
Stašková 68'; Pochmanová 88'	Report

Werner-Seelenbinder-Stadion, Luckenwalde
Referee: Marta Huerta De Aza (Spain)

6 April 2019
12:00

Germany	5–0	Czech Republic
Nüsken 8'; Martinez 49', 86'; Krumbiegel 77' (pen.); Müller 80' (pen.)	Report

Werner-Seelenbinder-Stadion, Luckenwalde
Referee: Volha Tsiareshka (Belarus)
6 April 2019
18:00

Austria	2–0	Greece
Großgasteiger 44'; Mak 77'	Report

Werner-Seelenbinder-Stadion, Luckenwalde
Referee: Marta Huerta De Aza (Spain)

9 April 2019
12:00

Austria	2–2	Germany
Brunnthaler 28'; Plattner 61'	Report	Krumbiegel 13'; Chmielinski 65'

Waldstadion, Ludwigsfelde
Referee: Volha Tsiareshka (Belarus)
9 April 2019
12:00

Greece	0–2	Czech Republic
	Report	Pěčková 36'; Novotná 76'

Werner-Seelenbinder-Stadion, Luckenwalde
Referee: Shona Shukrula (Netherlands)

==== Group 2 ====
Pos	Team	Pld	W	D	L	GF	GA	GD	Pts	Qualification
1	Belgium (H)	3	1	2	0	5	3	+2	5	Final tournament
2	Finland	3	1	2	0	4	3	+1	5	
3	Switzerland	3	1	1	1	4	5	−1	4	
4	Poland	3	0	1	2	3	5	−2	1	

Source: UEFA
Rules for classification: Qualification tiebreakers
(H) Hosts
3 April 2019
13:00

Belgium	2–0	Switzerland
Janssens 26'; Petry 65'	Report

Belgian National Football Centre, Tubize
Referee: Elvira Nurmustafina (Kazakhstan)
3 April 2019
19:00

Finland	1–0	Poland
Leskinen 79'	Report

Belgian National Football Centre, Tubize
Referee: Lizzy Van Der Helm (Netherlands)

6 April 2019
13:00

Finland	1–1	Belgium
Tuominen 67'	Report	Petry 90+1'

Belgian National Football Centre, Tubize
Referee: Angelika Soeder (Germany)
6 April 2019
19:00

Switzerland	2–1	Poland
Zaugg 45'; Gut 50'	Report	Tylak 36'

Belgian National Football Centre, Tubize
Referee: Elvira Nurmustafina (Kazakhstan)

9 April 2019
13:00

Switzerland	2–2	Finland
Ojanen 11' (o.g.); Fölmli 90+2'	Report	Siren 14'; Tulkki 89'

Stade Leburton, Tubize
Referee: Angelika Soeder (Germany)
9 April 2019
13:00

Poland	2–2	Belgium
Wójcik 7'; Jedlińska 65'	Report	Petry 12'; Buabadi 90+1'

Belgian National Football Centre, Tubize
Referee: Lizzy Van Der Helm (Netherlands)

==== Group 3 ====
Pos	Team	Pld	W	D	L	GF	GA	GD	Pts	Qualification
1	Netherlands (H)	3	3	0	0	9	1	+8	9	Final tournament
2	Iceland	3	1	1	1	9	4	+5	4	
3	Russia	3	1	1	1	3	3	0	4	
4	Bulgaria	3	0	0	3	0	13	−13	0	

Source: UEFA
Rules for classification: Qualification tiebreakers
(H) Hosts
3 April 2019
15:00

Russia	2–2	Iceland
Dergousova 14', 62'	Report	Þórðardóttir 40'; Ragnarsdóttir 67'

Sportpark Parkzicht, Uden
Referee: Ewa Augustyn (Poland)
3 April 2019
19:00

Netherlands	6–0	Bulgaria
Casparij 10'; Leuchter 11', 17'; Van de Westeringh 28'; Smits 34'; Iliycheva 37' (o.g.)	Report

Sportpark Zuid, Groesbeek
Referee: Henrikke Nervik (Norway)

6 April 2019
12:00

Iceland	6–0	Bulgaria
Eiríksdóttir 32', 71'; Jóhannsdóttir 36'; Vilhjálmsdóttir 54'; Hálfdánardóttir 85'; Baldursdóttir 88'	Report

Sportpark Zuid, Groesbeek
Referee: Ewa Augustyn (Poland)
6 April 2019
16:00

Netherlands	1–0	Russia
Van de Westeringh 3'	Report

Sportpark Parkzicht, Uden
Referee: Maria Marotta (Italy)

9 April 2019
19:00

Iceland	1–2	Netherlands
Jóhannsdóttir 48' (pen.)	Report	Van de Westeringh 20'; Baijings 87'

Sportpark Parkzicht, Uden
Referee: Maria Marotta (Italy)
9 April 2019
19:00

Bulgaria	0–1	Russia
	Report	Organova 30'

Sportpark Zuid, Groesbeek
Referee: Henrikke Nervik (Norway)

==== Group 4 ====
Pos	Team	Pld	W	D	L	GF	GA	GD	Pts	Qualification
1	Spain (H)	3	3	0	0	12	0	+12	9	Final tournament
2	Republic of Ireland	3	2	0	1	8	3	+5	6	
3	Serbia	3	0	1	2	1	7	−6	1	
4	Hungary	3	0	1	2	1	12	−11	1	

Source: UEFA
Rules for classification: Qualification tiebreakers
(H) Hosts
3 April 2019
13:00

Hungary	0–4	Republic of Ireland
	Report	Payne 31' (pen.), 68'; Farkas 37' (o.g.); McManus 90'

Estadio Municipal A Lomba, Vilagarcía de Arousa
Referee: Graziella Pirriatore (Italy)
3 April 2019
18:30

Spain	2–0	Serbia
Navarro 35', 41'	Report

Estadio Vero Boquete de San Lázaro, Santiago de Compostela
Referee: Anastasia Romanyuk (Ukraine)

6 April 2019
13:00

Republic of Ireland	4–0	Serbia
Ruddy 21'; Brady 58', 90+2'; Mackey 83'	Report

Estadio Municipal A Lomba, Vilagarcía de Arousa
Referee: Graziella Pirriatore (Italy)
6 April 2019
18:30

Spain	7–0	Hungary
Rubio 6', 9'; Pina 13' (pen.), 16', 64', 68'; Carmona 88'	Report

Estadio Vero Boquete de San Lázaro, Santiago de Compostela
Referee: Tess Olofsson (Sweden)

9 April 2019
18:30

Republic of Ireland	0–3	Spain
	Report	Pina 27', 30'; Slattery 48' (o.g.)

Estadio Vero Boquete de San Lázaro, Santiago de Compostela
Referee: Tess Olofsson (Sweden)
9 April 2019
18:30

Serbia	1–1	Hungary
Bulatović 30'	Report	Pusztai 83'

Estadio Municipal A Lomba, Vilagarcía de Arousa
Referee: Anastasia Romanyuk (Ukraine)

==== Group 5 ====
Pos	Team	Pld	W	D	L	GF	GA	GD	Pts	Qualification
1	Norway (H)	3	3	0	0	12	2	+10	9	Final tournament
2	Denmark	3	2	0	1	9	4	+5	6	
3	Ukraine	3	1	0	2	5	15	−10	3	
4	Northern Ireland	3	0	0	3	4	9	−5	0	

Source: UEFA
Rules for classification: Qualification tiebreakers
(H) Hosts
3 April 2019
13:00

Ukraine	0–6	Denmark
	Report	Hashemi 9'; Snerle 17'; Bilokur 19' (o.g.); Thomsen 35', 48'; Dissing 88'

Aka Arena, Hønefoss
Referee: Hristiana Guteva (Bulgaria)
3 April 2019
18:00

Norway	2–1	Northern Ireland
Haugland 37'; Olsen 49'	Report	Collighan 78'

Aka Arena, Hønefoss
Referee: Araksya Saribekyan (Armenia)

6 April 2019
13:00

Denmark	3–1	Northern Ireland
Hashemi 9'; Hasbo 66'; Pedersen 82'	Report	McDaniel 73'

Aka Arena, Hønefoss
Referee: Hristiana Guteva (Bulgaria)
6 April 2019
18:00

Norway	7–1	Ukraine
Olsen 8', 21', 42', 80'; Koleshchuk 44' (o.g.); Ildhusøy 61'; Sørum 90+2'	Report	Kozlova 76'

Aka Arena, Hønefoss
Referee: Ivana Projkovska (Macedonia)

9 April 2019
17:00

Denmark	0–3	Norway
	Report	Olsen 18'; Tvedten 52'; Sunde 61' (pen.)

Jessheim Stadion, Jessheim
Referee: Ivana Projkovska (Macedonia)
9 April 2019
17:00

Northern Ireland	2–4	Ukraine
McDaniel 10'; Collighan 54'	Report	Kunina 47', 90+3'; Kozlova 58', 88'

Aka Arena, Hønefoss
Referee: Araksya Saribekyan (Armenia)

==== Group 6 ====
Pos	Team	Pld	W	D	L	GF	GA	GD	Pts	Qualification
1	England (H)	3	3	0	0	13	0	+13	9	Final tournament
2	Italy	3	2	0	1	2	2	0	6	
3	Sweden	3	1	0	2	3	5	−2	3	
4	Turkey	3	0	0	3	0	11	−11	0	

Source: UEFA
Rules for classification: Qualification tiebreakers
(H) Hosts
3 April 2019
14:00 (13:00 BST)

England	7–0	Turkey
Salmon 25', 39'; Fitzgerald 33', 36'; Syme 41', 70'; Hemp 81'	Report

St George's Park, Burton upon Trent
Referee: Karoline Wacker (Germany)
3 April 2019
17:00 (16:00 BST)

Sweden	0–1	Italy
	Report	Baldi 74'

St George's Park, Burton upon Trent
Referee: Zuzana Valentová (Slovakia)

6 April 2019
14:00 (13:00 BST)

England	4–0	Sweden
Naz 3', 33'; Rutherford 23'; Palmer 36'	Report

St George's Park, Burton upon Trent
Referee: Silvia Domingos (Portugal)
6 April 2019
17:00 (16:00 BST)

Italy	1–0	Turkey
Bragonzi 22'	Report

St George's Park, Burton upon Trent
Referee: Zuzana Valentová (Slovakia)

9 April 2019
14:00 (13:00 BST)

Italy	0–2	England
	Report	Naz 3'; Hemp 9'

St George's Park, Burton upon Trent
Referee: Silvia Domingos (Portugal)
9 April 2019
14:00 (13:00 BST)

Turkey	0–3	Sweden
	Report	Kapocs 2', 10'; Nyström 86'

St George's Park pitch 4, Burton upon Trent
Referee: Karoline Wacker (Germany)

==== Group 7 ====
Pos	Team	Pld	W	D	L	GF	GA	GD	Pts	Qualification
1	France (H)	3	2	1	0	12	0	+12	7	Final tournament
2	Slovenia	3	2	1	0	6	1	+5	7	
3	Portugal	3	1	0	2	4	9	−5	3	
4	Slovakia	3	0	0	3	0	12	−12	0	

Source: UEFA
Rules for classification: Qualification tiebreakers
(H) Hosts
3 April 2019
15:00

Slovakia	0–3	Slovenia
	Report	Korošec 81' (pen.); Milovič 85'; Vindišar 90'

Stade Saint-Martin, Biarritz
Referee: Frida Nielsen (Denmark)
3 April 2019
17:00

France	6–0	Portugal
Malard 26', 35'; Bussy 45+2'; Lakrar 52'; Roux 84'; Baltimore 90+3'	Report

Stade Saint-Jean, Anglet
Referee: Vera Opeykina (Russia)

6 April 2019
15:00

Slovenia	3–1	Portugal
Pintarič 23'; Mori 37'; Korošec 62'	Report	Encarnação 44' (pen.)

Stade Didier Deschamps, Bayonne
Referee: Frida Nielsen (Denmark)
6 April 2019
17:00

France	6–0	Slovakia
Saint Georges 16' (pen.); Martinez 23'; Delabre 26'; Cardia 32', 37'; Malard 73'	Report

Stade Saint-Martin, Biarritz
Referee: Rebecca Welch (England)

9 April 2019
18:45

Slovenia	0–0	France
	Report

Stade Kechiloa, Saint-Jean-de-Luz
Referee: Rebecca Welch (England)
9 April 2019
18:45

Portugal	3–0	Slovakia
Martins 10' (pen.); Encarnação 45'; Faria 77'	Report

Stade Saint-Jean, Anglet
Referee: Vera Opeykina (Russia)

== Qualified teams ==
The following eight teams qualify for the final tournament.

Team	Qualified as	Qualified on	Previous appearances in Women's Under-19 Euro^{1} only U-19 era (since 2002)
Scotland	Hosts	9 December 2016	5 (2005, 2008, 2010, 2014, 2017)
Germany	Elite round Group 1 winners	9 April 2019	15 (**2002**, 2003, 2004, 2005, **2006**, **2007**, 2008, 2009, 2010, **2011**, 2013, 2015, 2016, 2017, 2018)
Belgium	Elite round Group 2 winners	9 April 2019	1 (2014)
Netherlands	Elite round Group 3 winners	9 April 2019	8 (2003, 2006, 2010, 2011, **2014**, 2016, 2017, 2018)
Spain	Elite round Group 4 winners	9 April 2019	13 (2002, 2003, **2004**, 2007, 2008, 2010, 2011, 2012, 2014, 2015, 2016, **2017**, **2018**)
Norway	Elite round Group 5 winners	9 April 2019	12 (2002, 2003, 2004, 2007, 2008, 2009, 2011, 2013, 2014, 2015, 2016, 2018)
England	Elite round Group 6 winners	9 April 2019	12 (2002, 2003, 2005, 2007, 2008, **2009**, 2010, 2012, 2013, 2014, 2015, 2017)
France	Elite round Group 7 winners	9 April 2019	14 (2002, **2003**, 2004, 2005, 2006, 2007, 2008, 2009, **2010**, **2013**, 2015, **2016**, 2017, 2018)

^{1} Bold indicates champions for that year. Italic indicates hosts for that year.

== Goalscorers ==
In the qualifying round there were 360 goals scored in 72 matches, for an average of 5 goals per match. In the elite round there were 148 goals scored in 42 matches, for an average of 3.52 goals per match. In total there were 508 goals scored in 114 matches, for an average of 4.46 goals per match.

12 goals

- (Germany) Sjoeke Nüsken

9 goals

- (Denmark) Vilja Dahl Pedersen

8 goals

- (Germany) Paulina Krumbiegel

7 goals

- (Finland) Roosa Tuominen
- (Netherlands) Romée Leuchter
- (Norway) Jenny Kristine Røsholm Olsen

6 goals

- (England) Jessica Naz
- (Hungary) Viktória Bódai
- (Norway) Malin Sunde
- (Slovenia) Nika Pintarič
- (Spain) Clàudia Pina
- (Switzerland) Stéphanie Waeber

5 goals

- (England) Aimee Palmer
- (England) Jess Park
- (Finland) Oona Siren
- (Germany) Gina-Maria Chmielinski
- (Iceland) Hlín Eiríksdóttir
- (Netherlands) Kerstin Casparij
- (Netherlands) Kirsten van de Westeringh
- (Norway) Mathilde Alsaker Rogde
- (Republic of Ireland) Heather Payne
- (Russia) Viktoriya Dergousova
- (Switzerland) Svenja Fölmli

4 goals

- (Austria) Marie Therese Höbinger
- (Belgium) Kaily Dhondt
- (Belgium) Lisa Petry
- (Denmark) Josefine Hasbo
- (Denmark) Dajan Hashemi
- (Germany) Lisa Ebert
- (Germany) Marie Müller
- (Iceland) Alexandra Jóhannsdóttir
- (Italy) Melissa Bellucci
- (Northern Ireland) Alexandra Collighan
- (Portugal) Telma Encarnação
- (Russia) Polina Organova
- (Serbia) Ivana Trbojević
- (Slovenia) Kaja Korošec
- (Sweden) Cornelia Kapocs

3 goals

- (Austria) Melanie Brunnthaler
- (Austria) Stefanie Großgasteiger
- (Belgium) Esther Buabadi
- (Denmark) Janni Thomsen
- (England) Lucy Fitzgerald
- (England) Gabriella Lucie Ravenscroft
- (Finland) Ruusa Portaankorva
- (France) Melvine Malard
- (Germany) Melissa Kössler
- (Hungary) Lily Anna Farkas
- (Hungary) Sára Pusztai
- (North Macedonia) Teodora Dimoska
- (Northern Ireland) Louise McDaniel
- (Norway) Julie Blakstad
- (Norway) Celin Bizet Ildhusøy
- (Poland) Karolina Tylak
- (Republic of Ireland) Alannah McEvoy
- (Republic of Ireland) Tiegan Ruddy
- (Slovenia) Sara Makovec
- (Slovenia) Adrijana Mori
- (Slovenia) Zala Vindišar
- (Ukraine) Nicole Kozlova

2 goals

- (Austria) Lisa Kolb
- (Austria) Maria Plattner
- (Bulgaria) Ebru Dormushali
- (Cyprus) Stavriana Antoniou
- (Czech Republic) Klára Cvrčková
- (Czech Republic) Simona Novotná
- (Czech Republic) Aneta Pochmanová
- (Denmark) Olivia Møller Holdt
- (Denmark) Emma Snerle
- (England) Lauren Hemp
- (England) Ebony Salmon
- (England) Emily Syme
- (France) Mickaélla Cardia
- (Germany) Shekiera Martinez
- (Hungary) Laura Kovács
- (Iceland) Eva Rut Ásþórsdóttir
- (Iceland) Karólína Lea Vilhjálmsdóttir
- (Israel) Shira Elinav
- (Israel) Reut Revaha
- (Kosovo) Flaka Aslanaj
- (Netherlands) Joëlle Smits
- (Norway) Rikke Bogetveit Nygård
- (Republic of Ireland) Kelly Brady
- (Republic of Ireland) Carla McManus
- (Republic of Ireland) Chloe Singleton
- (Serbia) Ana Barjaktarović
- (Serbia) Andjela Frajtović
- (Serbia) Jelena Maksimović
- (Slovakia) Andrea Bogorová
- (Slovakia) Katarína Niňajová
- (Slovakia) Laura Žemberyová
- (Slovenia) Ana Milovič
- (Spain) Eva Navarro
- (Spain) Silvia Rubio
- (Sweden) Emma Engström
- (Switzerland) Chiara Messerli
- (Switzerland) Leana Zaugg
- (Turkey) Melike Öztürk
- (Ukraine) Oksana Bilokur
- (Ukraine) Nadiia Kunina
- (Ukraine) Yuliya Semenyuk

1 goal

- (Albania) Sara Begallo
- (Albania) Donjeta Halilaj
- (Albania) Esi Lufo
- (Austria) Anna Bereuter
- (Austria) Celina Degen
- (Austria) Jelena Dordic
- (Austria) Julia Mak
- (Azerbaijan) Nino Gurgenidze
- (Azerbaijan) Vusala Seyfatdinova
- (Belarus) Karina Olkhovik
- (Belgium) Talitha De Groote
- (Belgium) Janne Geers
- (Belgium) Aster Janssens
- (Bosnia and Herzegovina) Marija Damjanović
- (Bulgaria) Ivana Naydenova
- (Czech Republic) Eliška Dvořáková
- (Czech Republic) Sára Illešová
- (Czech Republic) Kristýna Komárková
- (Czech Republic) Nela Krejčířová
- (Czech Republic) Alena Pěčková
- (Czech Republic) Eliška Sonntagová
- (Czech Republic) Andrea Stašková
- (Denmark) Lise Dissing
- (Denmark) Cecilie Johansen
- (Denmark) Sofie Svava
- (England) Sophie Domingo
- (England) Hannah Griffin
- (England) Esme Beth Morgan
- (England) Amy Rodgers
- (England) Ella Rutherford
- (Estonia) Riin Satsi
- (Estonia) Evelyn Šilina
- (Finland) Filippa Kilponen
- (Finland) Jasmin Leppioja
- (Finland) Dana Leskinen
- (Finland) Leena Mankki
- (Finland) Tuuli Siponen
- (Finland) Emmaliina Tulkki
- (Finland) Aino Vuorinen
- (France) Sandy Baltimore
- (France) Kessya Bussy
- (France) Amelie Delabre
- (France) Maëlle Lakrar
- (France) Lisa Martinez
- (France) Jessy Roux
- (France) Emeline Saint Georges
- (Germany) Nicole Anyomi
- (Germany) Meryem Cennet Cal
- (Germany) Ivana Fuso
- (Germany) Christin Meyer
- (Germany) Lara Schmidt
- (Germany) Lena Uebach
- (Germany) Verena Wieder
- (Greece) Eirini Gatoudi
- (Greece) Grigoria Pouliou
- (Greece) Dimitra Proxenou
- (Hungary) Vivien Pintye
- (Hungary) Fanni Vachter
- (Iceland) Berglind Baldursdóttir
- (Iceland) Bergdís Fanney Einarsdóttir
- (Iceland) Helena Ósk Hálfdánardóttir
- (Iceland) Sveindís Jane Jónsdóttir
- (Iceland) Stefanía Ragnarsdóttir
- (Iceland) Katla María Þórðardóttir
- (Israel) Reut Michaeli
- (Italy) Sara Baldi
- (Italy) Asia Bragonzi
- (Italy) Flavia Devoto
- (Italy) Giada Greggi
- (Italy) Elisa Polli
- (Italy) Valentina Puglisi
- (Italy) Chiara Ripamonti
- (Kazakhstan) Arailym Orynbassarova
- (Kosovo) Kaltrina Biqkaj
- (Kosovo) Fleta Musaj
- (Latvia) Ieva Krasnova
- (Latvia) Karlīna Miksone
- (Lithuania) Karolina Kurapatkina
- (North Macedonia) Marija Belistojanoska
- (Malta) Jana Barbara
- (Moldova) Olesea Terentiev
- (Montenegro) Jelena Vujadinović
- (Netherlands) Jill Baijings
- (Netherlands) Lieske Carleer
- (Netherlands) Lisa Doorn
- (Netherlands) Kelsey Geraedts
- (Netherlands) Chasity Grant
- (Netherlands) Naomi Hilhorst
- (Netherlands) Lynn Wilms
- (Northern Ireland) Megan Bell
- (Northern Ireland) Kelsie Burrows
- (Northern Ireland) Kaitlyn Canavan
- (Northern Ireland) Kaia Deane
- (Norway) Thea Bjelde
- (Norway) Sara Kanutte Fornes
- (Norway) My Sørsdahl Haugland
- (Norway) Sara Iren Lindbak Hørte
- (Norway) Anna Jøsendal
- (Norway) Elin Åhgren Sørum
- (Norway) Olaug Tvedten
- (Poland) Klaudia Jedlińska
- (Poland) Olga Sirant
- (Poland) Weronika Wójcik
- (Portugal) Vânia Araújo Duarte
- (Portugal) Andreia Faria
- (Portugal) Joana Martins
- (Portugal) Ana Isabel Teles
- (Republic of Ireland) Isibeal Atkinson
- (Republic of Ireland) Lucia Lobato
- (Republic of Ireland) Megan Mackey
- (Serbia) Milica Bulatović
- (Serbia) Andjela Krstić
- (Serbia) Dunja Mostarac
- (Serbia) Nikolina Plavšić
- (Serbia) Sara Savanović
- (Slovakia) Laura Bieliková
- (Slovakia) Desana Dianišková
- (Slovakia) Lucia Droppová
- (Slovakia) Victoria Kaláberová
- (Slovakia) Viktória Kratochvílová
- (Slovakia) Diana Lemešová
- (Slovenia) Eva Potočnik
- (Spain) Olga Carmona
- (Sweden) Saga Jontoft
- (Sweden) Wilma Ljung Klingwall
- (Sweden) Paulina Nyström
- (Sweden) Beata Olsson
- (Switzerland) Victoria Bischof
- (Switzerland) Tyara Buser
- (Switzerland) Annina Enz
- (Switzerland) Malin Gut
- (Switzerland) Seraina Piubel
- (Turkey) Irem Eren
- (Turkey) Sedanur İncik
- (Turkey) Birgül Sadıkoğlu
- (Ukraine) Romana Lukach
- (Ukraine) Veronika Nikitiuk
- (Wales) Grace Horrell
- (Wales) Elise Hughes
- (Wales) Jennifer Hughes
- (Wales) Emily Jones
- (Wales) Cassia Pike
- (Wales) Ella Powell
- (Wales) Tamsyn Sibanda

1 own goal

- (Albania) Gentiana Agalliu (against Netherlands)
- (Belgium) Constance Brackman (against Iceland)
- (Belgium) Gwyneth Vanaenrode (against Wales)
- (Bulgaria) Gergana Iliycheva (against Netherlands)
- (Estonia) Reti Talts (against Kosovo)
- (Finland) Sanni Ojanen (against Switzerland)
- (Hungary) Lily Anna Farkas (against Republic of Ireland)
- (Kazakhstan) Arailym Orynbassarova (against Sweden)
- (Latvia) Līga Brigmane (against Russia)
- (Liechtenstein) Elena Lohner (against Serbia)
- (North Macedonia) Sindis Polozhani (against Finland)
- (Republic of Ireland) Aoife Slattery (against Spain)
- (Slovakia) Diana Lemešová (against England)
- (Ukraine) Oksana Bilokur (against Denmark)
- (Ukraine) Mariya Koleshchuk (against Norway)

Source: UEFA.com
