= 2019 UEFA Women's Under-19 Championship squads =

Player listing of women's football competition

Each national team submitted a squad of 20 players, two of whom had to be goalkeepers.

Ages are as of the start of the tournament, 16 July 2019.

== Group A ==
=== France ===
Head Coach: Gilles Eyquem

No.	Pos.	Player	Date of birth (age)	Caps	Goals	Club
1	GK	Justine Lerond	29 February 2000 (aged 19)	3	0	(French Football Federation) Metz
2	DF	Lisa Martinez	13 June 2000 (aged 19)	2	1	(French Football Federation) Montpellier
3	DF	Selma Bacha	9 November 2000 (aged 18)	3	0	(French Football Federation) Lyon
4	DF	Emeline Saint-Georges	5 April 2000 (aged 19)	2	1	
5	DF	Maëlle Lakrar	27 May 2000 (aged 19)	2	1	(French Football Federation) Montpellier
6	MF	Carla Polito	13 January 2000 (aged 19)	3	0	(French Football Federation) Lille
7	FW	Kessya Bussy	19 June 2000 (aged 19)	3	1	
8	MF	Oriane Jean-François	14 August 2001 (aged 17)	2	0	(French Football Federation) Paris
9	FW	Melvine Malard	28 June 2000 (aged 19)	3	3	(French Football Federation) Lyon
10	MF	Margaux Le Mouël	8 August 2001 (aged 17)	2	0	(French Football Federation) Guingamp
11	FW	Sandy Baltimore	19 February 2000 (aged 19)	3	1	(French Football Federation) Paris Saint-Germain
12	DF	Assimina Maoulida	30 January 2002 (aged 17)	0	0	
13	DF	Manon Revelli	26 November 2001 (aged 17)	2	0	
14	MF	Chloé Philippe	21 January 2000 (aged 19)	0	0	(French Football Federation) Stade de Reims
15	MF	Thelma Eninger	23 December 2001 (aged 17)	0	0	
16	GK	Mary Innebeer	2 November 2001 (aged 17)	1	0	(French Football Federation) Lille
17	MF	Julie Dufour	29 May 2001 (aged 18)	3	0	(French Football Federation) Lille
18	MF	Naomie Feller	6 November 2000 (aged 18)	0	0	
19	FW	Lorena Azzaro	22 October 2000 (aged 18)	0	0	(French Football Federation) Lyon
20	FW	Vicki Bècho	3 October 2003 (aged 15)	0	0	

=== Netherlands ===
Head Coach: Jessica Torny

No.	Pos.	Player	Date of birth (age)	Caps	Goals	Club
1	GK	Daphne van Domselaar	6 March 2000 (aged 19)	4	0	(Royal Dutch Football Association) FC Twente
2	DF	Lynn Wilms	3 October 2000 (aged 18)	5	1	(Royal Dutch Football Association) FC Twente
3	DF	Lieske Carleer	16 April 2001 (aged 18)	4	1	(United States Soccer Federation) Arizona State University
4	DF	Lisa Doorn	8 December 2000 (aged 18)	6	1	(Royal Dutch Football Association) Ajax
5	DF	Janou Levels	30 October 2000 (aged 18)	5	0	(Royal Dutch Football Association) PSV
6	MF	Jonna van de Velde	4 November 2001 (aged 17)	6	0	(Royal Dutch Football Association) Ajax
7	FW	Romée Leuchter	12 January 2001 (aged 18)	6	7	(Royal Dutch Football Association) PSV
8	MF	Marisa Olislagers	9 September 2000 (aged 18)	6	0	(Royal Dutch Football Association) ADO Den Haag
9	FW	Joëlle Smits	7 February 2000 (aged 19)	5	2	(Royal Dutch Football Association) FC Twente
10	FW	Jill Baijings	23 February 2001 (aged 18)	3	1	(Royal Dutch Football Association) SC Heerenveen
11	MF	Kirsten van de Westeringh	6 June 2001 (aged 18)	6	5	(Royal Dutch Football Association) Ajax
12	DF	Moïsa van Koot	9 June 2001 (aged 18)	2	0	(Royal Dutch Football Association) PEC Zwolle
13	DF	Gwyneth Hendriks	4 March 2001 (aged 18)	2	0	(Royal Dutch Football Association) Ajax
14	MF	Roos van der Veen	30 October 2001 (aged 17)	0	0	(Royal Dutch Football Association) SC Heerenveen
15	MF	Dana Philippo	2 July 2001 (aged 18)	4	0	(Royal Dutch Football Association) SC Heerenveen
16	GK	Nicole Panis	3 July 2000 (aged 19)	0	0	(United States Soccer Federation) University of the Cumberlands
17	MF	Naomi Hilhorst	26 October 2001 (aged 17)	5	1	(Royal Dutch Football Association) FC Twente
18	MF	Romy Speelman	24 October 2000 (aged 18)	1	0	(Royal Dutch Football Association) ADO Den Haag
19	FW	Chasity Grant	19 April 2001 (aged 18)	4	1	(Royal Dutch Football Association) ADO Den Haag
20	MF	Kerstin Casparij	19 August 2000 (aged 18)	6	5	(Royal Dutch Football Association) SC Heerenveen

=== Norway ===
Head Coach: Nils Lexerød

No.	Pos.	Player	Date of birth (age)	Caps	Goals	Club
1	GK	Karen Oline Sneve	21 February 2000 (aged 19)	5	0	(Norwegian Football Federation) Lyn
2	DF	Malin Sunde	15 July 2000 (aged 19)	6	6	(Norwegian Football Federation) Trondheims-Ørn
3	DF	Joanna Bækkelund	10 December 2000 (aged 18)	6	0	(Norwegian Football Federation) Lyn
4	DF	My Sørsdahl Haugland	3 February 2000 (aged 19)	3	1	(Norwegian Football Federation) Kolbotn
5	FW	Anna Jøsendal	29 April 2001 (aged 18)	5	1	(Norwegian Football Federation) Avaldsnes
6	DF	Mathilde Hauge Harviken	29 December 2001 (aged 17)	0	0	(Norwegian Football Federation) Fart
7	MF	Julie Blakstad	27 August 2001 (aged 17)	6	3	(Norwegian Football Federation) Fart
8	MF	Rikke Bogetveit Nygård	22 May 2000 (aged 19)	3	2	(Norwegian Football Federation) Arna-Bjørnar
9	MF	Elin Åhgren Sørum	6 March 2000 (aged 19)	6	1	(Norwegian Football Federation) Trondheims-Ørn
10	FW	Olaug Tvedten	20 July 2000 (aged 18)	6	1	(Norwegian Football Federation) Avaldsnes
11	FW	Jenny Kristine Røsholm Olsen	18 March 2000 (aged 19)	6	7	(Norwegian Football Federation) Lyn
12	GK	Hanne Larsen	15 July 2001 (aged 18)	0	0	(Norwegian Football Federation) Medkila
13	DF	Marthine Østenstad	18 March 2001 (aged 18)	5	0	(Norwegian Football Federation) Klepp
14	DF	Sara Iren Lindbak Hørte	24 November 2000 (aged 18)	2	1	(Norwegian Football Federation) Kolbotn
15	MF	Emilie Bragstad	6 December 2001 (aged 17)	2	0	(Norwegian Football Federation) Trondheims-Ørn
16	FW	Elisabeth Terland	28 June 2001 (aged 18)	3	0	(Norwegian Football Federation) Klepp
17	FW	Runa Lillgård	26 February 2001 (aged 18)	0	0	(Norwegian Football Federation) Lyn
18	FW	Celin Ildhusøy	24 October 2001 (aged 17)	6	3	(Norwegian Football Federation) Vålerenga
19	MF	Ragne Hagen Svastuen	17 November 2000 (aged 18)	3	0	(Norwegian Football Federation) Røa
20	DF	Silje Bjørneboe	25 February 2000 (aged 19)	1	0	(Norwegian Football Federation) Stabæk

=== Scotland ===
Head Coach: Pauline Hamill

No.	Pos.	Player	Date of birth (age)	Caps	Goals	Club
1	GK	Emily Mutch	28 June 2001 (aged 18)	0	0	(Scottish Football Association) Heart of Midlothian
2	MF	Amy Muir	7 March 2000 (aged 19)	6	0	Unattached
3	MF	Charlotte Newsham	14 May 2000 (aged 19)	3	0	(The Football Association) Manchester United
4	MF	Jennifer Smith	20 June 2002 (aged 17)	0	0	(Scottish Football Association) Heart of Midlothian
5	DF	Jenna Clark	29 September 2001 (aged 17)	0	0	(Scottish Football Association) Glasgow City
6	DF	Rachel Brown	24 October 2000 (aged 18)	3	0	(The Football Association) Leicester City
7	MF	Kirstie McIntosh	13 July 2001 (aged 18)	0	0	(Scottish Football Association) Hamilton Academical
8	DF	Michaela McAlonie	13 December 2001 (aged 17)	6	0	(Scottish Football Association) Spartans
9	FW	Kathleen McGovern	27 June 2002 (aged 17)	0	0	(Scottish Football Association) Celtic
10	MF	Jamie-Lee Napier	6 April 2000 (aged 19)	8	0	(Scottish Football Association) Hibernian
11	MF	Emma Craig	8 March 2001 (aged 18)	0	0	(Scottish Football Association) Celtic
12	GK	Sophie Allison	11 September 2001 (aged 17)	0	0	(Scottish Football Association) Glasgow City
13	DF	Robyn McCafferty	30 June 2003 (aged 16)	0	0	(Scottish Football Association) Spartans
14	MF	Rebecca McGowan	1 August 2001 (aged 17)	0	0	(Scottish Football Association) St Johnstone
15	DF	Rachel Connor	25 February 2000 (aged 19)	2	0	(Scottish Football Association) Stirling University
16	FW	Kirsty Morrison	1 September 2001 (aged 17)	0	0	(Scottish Football Association) Hibernian
17	DF	Carly Girasoli	11 April 2002 (aged 17)	0	0	(Scottish Football Association) Glasgow City
18	DF	Laura McCartney	17 December 2002 (aged 16)	0	0	(Scottish Football Association) Rangers
19	FW	Lauren Davidson	1 October 2001 (aged 17)	5	1	(Scottish Football Association) Hibernian
20	FW	Abby Callaghan	15 June 2001 (aged 18)	0	0	(Scottish Football Association) Motherwell

== Group B ==
=== Belgium ===
Head Coach: Xavier Donnay

No.	Pos.	Player	Date of birth (age)	Caps	Goals	Club
1	GK	Femke Bastiaen	11 April 2000 (aged 19)	6	0	
2	DF	Sari Kees	17 February 2001 (aged 18)	6	0	
3	DF	Romy Camps	11 January 2001 (aged 18)	5	0	
4	FW	Gwyneth Vanaenrode	25 May 2000 (aged 19)	2	0	(Royal Belgian Football Association) Standard Liège
5	DF	Saar Verdonck	2 February 2000 (aged 19)	0	0	
6	DF	Zenia Mertens	27 February 2001 (aged 18)	5	0	
7	MF	Karlijn Knapen	6 July 2001 (aged 18)	6	0	(Royal Belgian Football Association) Standard Liège
8	MF	Amber Tysiak	26 January 2000 (aged 19)	3	0	
9	FW	Lisa Petry	12 February 2001 (aged 18)	6	4	(Royal Belgian Football Association) Standard Liège
10	FW	Esther Buabadi	18 November 2001 (aged 17)	6	3	
11	FW	Janne Geers	21 July 2001 (aged 17)	6	1	
12	GK	Joséphine Delvaux	26 February 2001 (aged 18)	0	0	
13	DF	Léa Cordier	9 August 2002 (aged 16)	0	0	
14	FW	Talitha De Groote	19 August 2001 (aged 17)	4	1	
15	MF	Aster Janssens	12 March 2001 (aged 18)	6	1	
16	MF	Jarne Teulings	11 January 2002 (aged 17)	0	0	
17	DF	Tiffanie Vanderdonckt	1 January 2000 (aged 19)	1	0	
18	MF	Stephanie Pirotte	13 February 2001 (aged 18)	5	0	
19	FW	Tess Wils	30 August 2002 (aged 16)	0	0	
20	DF	Constance Brackman	20 October 2001 (aged 17)	6	0	

=== England ===
Head Coach: Rehanne Skinner

No.	Pos.	Player	Date of birth (age)	Caps	Goals	Club
1	GK	Hannah Hampton	16 November 2000 (aged 18)	3	0	(The Football Association) Birmingham City
2	DF	Grace Neville	9 April 2000 (aged 19)	3	0	(The Football Association) London City Lionesses
3	DF	Olivia Smith	4 May 2000 (aged 19)	5	0	(United States Soccer Federation) UCF Knights
4	MF	Aimee Palmer	25 July 2000 (aged 18)	6	5	(The Football Association) Manchester United
5	DF	Esme Morgan	18 October 2000 (aged 18)	6	1	(The Football Association) Manchester City
6	DF	Georgia Eaton-Collins	9 June 2000 (aged 19)	6	0	(United States Soccer Federation) Florida Gators
7	DF	Lucy Fitzgerald	29 December 2000 (aged 18)	4	3	(The Football Association) London City Lionesses
8	DF	Amy Rodgers	4 May 2000 (aged 19)	3	1	(The Football Association) Liverpool
9	FW	Jessica Naz	24 September 2000 (aged 18)	5	6	(The Football Association) Tottenham Hotspur
10	MF	Emily Syme	23 July 2000 (aged 18)	3	2	(The Football Association) Aston Villa
11	FW	Lauren Hemp	7 August 2000 (aged 18)	3	2	(The Football Association) Manchester City
12	MF	Ella Rutherford	28 April 2000 (aged 19)	3	1	(The Football Association) Bristol City
13	GK	Emily Ramsey	16 November 2000 (aged 18)	3	0	(The Football Association) Manchester United
14	FW	Lauren James	29 September 2001 (aged 17)	3	0	(The Football Association) Manchester United
15	DF	Niamh Cashin	24 February 2000 (aged 19)	4	0	(United States Soccer Federation) Rider Broncs
16	FW	Ebony Salmon	27 January 2001 (aged 18)	3	2	(The Football Association) Bristol City
17	MF	Jess Park	21 October 2001 (aged 17)	3	5	(The Football Association) Manchester City
18	MF	Molly Pike	22 January 2001 (aged 18)	0	0	(The Football Association) Everton
19	DF	Asmita Ale	3 November 2001 (aged 17)	0	0	(The Football Association) Aston Villa
20	DF	Kiera Skeels	20 January 2001 (aged 18)	0	0	(The Football Association) Reading

=== Germany ===
Head Coach: Maren Meinert

No.	Pos.	Player	Date of birth (age)	Caps	Goals	Club
1	GK	Wiebke Willebrandt	16 January 2001 (aged 18)	1	0	
2	DF	Alicia-Sophie Gudorf	23 May 2001 (aged 18)	0	0	(German Football Association) 1. FC Köln
3	DF	Lisann Kaut	24 August 2000 (aged 18)	6	0	(German Football Association) TSG 1899 Hoffenheim
4	DF	Sophia Kleinherne	12 April 2000 (aged 19)	3	0	(German Football Association) 1. FFC Frankfurt
5	DF	Lara Schmidt	21 July 2000 (aged 18)	6	1	(German Football Association) USV Jena
6	MF	Greta Stegemann	12 February 2001 (aged 18)	2	0	(German Football Association) SC Freiburg
7	FW	Melissa Kössler	4 March 2000 (aged 19)	5	3	(German Football Association) Turbine Potsdam
8	MF	Leonie Köster	6 April 2001 (aged 18)	3	0	(German Football Association) Bayern Munich
9	FW	Nicole Anyomi	10 February 2000 (aged 19)	6	1	(German Football Association) SGS Essen
10	MF	Marie Müller	25 July 2000 (aged 18)	6	4	(German Football Association) SC Freiburg
11	MF	Gina-Maria Chmielinski	7 June 2000 (aged 19)	6	5	(German Football Association) Turbine Potsdam
12	GK	Rafaela Borggräfe	5 March 2000 (aged 19)	3	0	(German Football Association) SC Freiburg
13	DF	Laura Donhauser	4 September 2001 (aged 17)	3	0	(German Football Association) Bayern Munich
14	FW	Paulina Krumbiegel	27 October 2000 (aged 18)	6	8	(German Football Association) TSG 1899 Hoffenheim
15	FW	Lisa Ebert	6 July 2000 (aged 19)	4	4	(German Football Association) 1. FFC Frankfurt
16	MF	Anna Aehling	23 March 2001 (aged 18)	0	0	(German Football Association) Gütersloh 2009
17	MF	Lena Uebach	31 July 2000 (aged 18)	5	1	(German Football Association) Bayer Leverkusen
18	FW	Shekiera Martinez	4 July 2001 (aged 18)	3	2	(German Football Association) 1. FFC Frankfurt
19	FW	Christin Meyer	14 October 2000 (aged 18)	2	1	
20	DF	Juliane Wirtz	22 August 2001 (aged 17)	1	0	(German Football Association) Bayer Leverkusen

=== Spain ===
Head Coach: Pedro López

No.	Pos.	Player	Date of birth (age)	Caps	Goals	Club
1	GK	Enith Salón	24 September 2000 (aged 18)	0	0	(Royal Spanish Football Federation) Valencia
2	DF	Oihane Hernández	4 May 2000 (aged 19)	3	0	(Royal Spanish Football Federation) Athletic Club
3	DF	Berta Pujadas	9 April 2000 (aged 19)	2	0	(Royal Spanish Football Federation) Valencia
4	DF	Laia Aleixandri	25 August 2000 (aged 18)	3	0	(Royal Spanish Football Federation) Atlético Madrid
5	DF	Laia Codina	22 January 2000 (aged 19)	1	0	(Royal Spanish Football Federation) Barcelona
6	DF	Anna Torrodá	21 January 2000 (aged 19)	2	0	(Royal Spanish Football Federation) Espanyol
7	FW	Rosa Otermin	2 October 2000 (aged 18)	2	0	(Royal Spanish Football Federation) Atlético Madrid
8	FW	Olga Carmona	12 June 2000 (aged 19)	3	1	(Royal Spanish Football Federation) Sevilla
9	FW	Clàudia Pina	12 August 2001 (aged 17)	3	6	(Royal Spanish Football Federation) Barcelona
10	MF	Nerea Eizaguirre	4 January 2000 (aged 19)	3	0	(Royal Spanish Football Federation) Real Sociedad
11	FW	Candela Andújar	26 March 2000 (aged 19)	3	0	(Royal Spanish Football Federation) Barcelona
12	MF	Itziar Pinillos	21 September 2000 (aged 18)	2	0	(Royal Spanish Football Federation) Atlético Madrid
13	GK	Catalina Coll	23 April 2001 (aged 18)	2	0	(Royal Spanish Football Federation) Barcelona
14	MF	Silvia Rubio	12 October 2000 (aged 18)	2	2	(Royal Spanish Football Federation) Madrid
15	DF	María Méndez	10 April 2001 (aged 18)	0	0	(Royal Spanish Football Federation) Deportivo de La Coruña
16	MF	Teresa Abelleira	9 January 2000 (aged 19)	3	0	(Royal Spanish Football Federation) Deportivo de La Coruña
17	MF	Rosa Márquez Baena	22 December 2000 (aged 18)	3	0	(Royal Spanish Football Federation) Real Betis
18	FW	Eva Navarro	27 January 2001 (aged 18)	3	2	(Royal Spanish Football Federation) Levante
19	FW	Carla Bautista Piqueras	14 March 2000 (aged 19)	3	0	(Royal Spanish Football Federation) Real Sociedad
20	FW	Athenea del Castillo	24 October 2000 (aged 18)	2	0	(Royal Spanish Football Federation) CDE Racing
