= 2019 UEFA Women's Under-19 Championship =

Tournament details
- Host country: Scotland
- Dates: 16–28 July
- Teams: 8 (from 1 confederation)
- Venue: 4 (in 4 host cities)

Final positions
- Champions: France (5th title)
- Runners-up: Germany

Tournament statistics
- Matches played: 15
- Goals scored: 49 (3.27 per match)
- Top scorer(s): (France) Melvine Malard (4 goals)

The 2019 UEFA Women's Under-19 Championship (also known as UEFA Women's Under-19 Euro 2019) was the 18th edition of the UEFA Women's Under-19 Championship (22nd edition if the Under-18 era is included), the annual international youth football championship organised by UEFA for the women's under-19 national teams of Europe. Scotland, which were selected by UEFA on 9 December 2016, was the host of the tournament, which took place from 16 to 28 July 2019.

A total of eight teams played in the tournament, with players born on or after 1 January 2000 eligible to participate. Starting from this season, up to five substitutions are permitted per team in each match.

Similar to the previous editions held in odd-numbered years, the tournament acted as the UEFA qualifiers for the FIFA U-20 Women's World Cup. The top four teams of the tournament would have qualified for the 2021 FIFA U-20 Women's World Cup (originally 2020 but postponed due to COVID-19 pandemic) in Costa Rica as the UEFA representatives. However, FIFA announced on 17 November 2020 that this edition of the World Cup would be cancelled.

France defeated Germany 2–1 in the final to claim its fifth title. Spain were the defending champions, but lost 1–3 to France in the semi-finals after extra-time.

== Qualification ==
A total of 51 UEFA nations entered the competition (including Liechtenstein who entered a competitive women's national team tournament for the first time), and with the hosts Scotland qualifying automatically, the other 50 teams competed in the qualifying competition to determine the remaining seven spots in the final tournament. The qualifying competition consisted of two rounds: Qualifying round, which took place in autumn 2018, and Elite round, which took place in spring 2019.

=== Qualified teams ===
The following teams qualified for the final tournament.

Note: All appearance statistics include only U-19 era (since 2002).

Team	Method of qualification	Appearance	Last appearance	Previous best performance
Scotland	Hosts	6th	2017 (group stage)	Group stage (2005, 2008, 2010, 2014, 2017)
Germany	Elite round Group 1 winners	16th	2018 (runners-up)	Champions (2002, 2006, 2007, 2011)
Belgium	Elite round Group 2 winners	2nd	2014 (group stage)	Group stage (2014)
Netherlands	Elite round Group 3 winners	9th	2018 (group stage)	Champions (2014)
Spain	Elite round Group 4 winners	14th	2018 (champions)	Champions (2004, 2017, 2018)
Norway	Elite round Group 5 winners	13th	2018 (semi-finals)	Runners-up (2003, 2008, 2011)
England	Elite round Group 6 winners	13th	2017 (group stage)	Champions (2009)
France	Elite round Group 7 winners	15th	2018 (group stage)	Champions (2003, 2010, 2013, 2016)

=== Final draw ===
The final draw was held on 16 April 2019, 12:00 BST (UTC+1), at Barras Art and Design in Glasgow, Scotland. The eight teams were drawn into two groups of four teams. There was no seeding, except that the hosts Scotland were assigned to position A1 in the draw.

== Venues ==
The tournament was held in four venues:

Paisley	2019 UEFA Women's Under-19 Championship is located in Scotland	Perth
St Mirren Park	2019 UEFA Women's Under-19 Championship is located in Scotland	McDiarmid Park
Capacity: 7,937	2019 UEFA Women's Under-19 Championship is located in Scotland	Capacity: 10,696
3 group matches, semi-final, final	2019 UEFA Women's Under-19 Championship is located in Scotland	3 group matches, potential play-off
Glasgow	2019 UEFA Women's Under-19 Championship is located in Scotland	Stirling
Firhill Stadium	2019 UEFA Women's Under-19 Championship is located in Scotland	Forthbank Stadium
Capacity: 10,102	2019 UEFA Women's Under-19 Championship is located in Scotland	Capacity: 3,798
3 group matches, semi-final	2019 UEFA Women's Under-19 Championship is located in Scotland	3 group matches

== Squads ==
Each national team have to submit a squad of 20 players (Regulations Article 39).

== Group stage ==
The final tournament schedule was announced on 26 April 2019.

The group winners and runners-up advanced to the semi-finals and qualified for the 2021 FIFA U-20 Women's World Cup.

Tiebreakers

In the group stage, teams are ranked according to points (3 points for a win, 1 point for a draw, 0 points for a loss), and if tied on points, the following tiebreaking criteria are applied, in the order given, to determine the rankings (Regulations Articles 17.01 and 17.02):

1. Points in head-to-head matches among tied teams;
2. Goal difference in head-to-head matches among tied teams;
3. Goals scored in head-to-head matches among tied teams;
4. If more than two teams are tied, and after applying all head-to-head criteria above, a subset of teams are still tied, all head-to-head criteria above are reapplied exclusively to this subset of teams;
5. Goal difference in all group matches;
6. Goals scored in all group matches;
7. Penalty shoot-out if only two teams have the same number of points, and they met in the last round of the group and are tied after applying all criteria above (not used if more than two teams have the same number of points, or if their rankings are not relevant for qualification for the next stage);
8. Disciplinary points (red card = 3 points, yellow card = 1 point, expulsion for two yellow cards in one match = 3 points);
9. UEFA coefficient for the qualifying round draw;
10. Drawing of lots.

All times are local, BST (UTC+1).

=== Group A ===
Pos	Team	Pld	W	D	L	GF	GA	GD	Pts	Qualification
1	France	3	2	1	0	8	5	+3	7	Knockout stage and 2021 FIFA U-20 Women's World Cup
2	Netherlands	3	2	0	1	10	3	+7	6	Knockout stage and 2021 FIFA U-20 Women's World Cup
3	Norway	3	1	1	1	7	8	−1	4	
4	Scotland	3	0	0	3	1	10	−9	0	

Source: UEFA
Rules for classification: Group stage tiebreakers
16 July 2019
16:00

Norway	0–5	Netherlands
	Report	Smits 2', 44'; Van de Velde 5'; Leuchter 43'; Van de Westeringh 69'

Firhill Stadium, Glasgow
Referee: Ewa Augustyn (Poland)
16 July 2019
19:30

Scotland	1–2	France
Craig 81'	Report	Baltimore 60'; Feller 90+1'

St Mirren Park, Paisley
Referee: Zuzana Valentová (Slovakia)

19 July 2019
16:00

Netherlands	1–3	France
Van de Velde 7'	Report	Feller 5'; Malard 85', 90+3'

St Mirren Park, Paisley
Referee: Silvia Domingos (Portugal)
19 July 2019
18:15

Scotland	0–4	Norway
	Report	Bragstad 21'; Jøsendal 24'; Olsen 45'; Nygård 45+3'

Firhill Stadium, Glasgow
Referee: Maria Marotta (Italy)

22 July 2019
18:15

Netherlands	4–0	Scotland
Wilms 8'; Olislagers 33'; Doorn 81', 90'	Report

St Mirren Park, Paisley
Referee: Elvira Nurmustafina (Kazakhstan)
22 July 2019
18:15

France	3–3	Norway
Azzaro 9'; Becho 34'; Malard 77'	Report	Bragstad 12', 40'; Hørte 89'

Firhill Stadium, Glasgow
Referee: Ivana Projkovska (Macedonia)

=== Group B ===
Pos	Team	Pld	W	D	L	GF	GA	GD	Pts	Qualification
1	Germany	3	2	1	0	7	1	+6	7	Knockout stage and 2021 FIFA U-20 Women's World Cup
2	Spain	3	2	1	0	3	0	+3	7	Knockout stage and 2021 FIFA U-20 Women's World Cup
3	England	3	1	0	2	2	3	−1	3	
4	Belgium	3	0	0	3	0	8	−8	0	

Source: UEFA
Rules for classification: Group stage tiebreakers
16 July 2019
16:00

Spain	2–0	Belgium
Pina 56' (pen.); Aleixandri 65'	Report

Forthbank Stadium, Stirling
Referee: Maria Marotta (Italy)
16 July 2019
19:30

England	1–2	Germany
Naz 90+2'	Report	Kössler 12'; Krumbiegel 32'

McDiarmid Park, Perth
Referee: Ivana Projkovska (Macedonia)

19 July 2019
16:00

England	0–1	Spain
	Report	Carmona 22'

Forthbank Stadium, Stirling
Referee: Elvira Nurmustafina (Kazakhstan)
19 July 2019
19:30

Belgium	0–5	Germany
	Report	Anyomi 35', 58'; Krumbiegel 41'; Kössler 53'; Ebert 81'

McDiarmid Park, Perth
Referee: Zuzana Valentová (Slovakia)

22 July 2019
16:00

Belgium	0–1	England
	Report	Salmon 26'

McDiarmid Park, Perth
Referee: Ewa Augustyn (Poland)
22 July 2019
16:00

Germany	0–0	Spain
	Report

Forthbank Stadium, Stirling
Referee: Silvia Domingos (Portugal)

== Knockout stage ==
In the knockout stage, extra time and penalty shoot-out are used to decide the winner if necessary.

=== Bracket ===
Semi-finals
25 July – Paisley
France (a.e.t.)	3
Spain	1
25 July – Glasgow
Germany	3
Netherlands	1

Final
28 July – Paisley
France	2
Germany	1

=== Semi-finals ===
25 July 2019
16:00

Germany	3–1	Netherlands
Kössler 19'; Müller 81' (pen.); Martinez 89'	Report	Baijings 61'

Firhill Stadium, Glasgow
Attendance: 301
Referee: Maria Marotta (Italy)

25 July 2019
19:30

France	3–1 (a.e.t.)	Spain
Malard 104'; Becho 110', 114'	Report	Del Castillo 120'

St Mirren Park, Paisley
Referee: Ewa Augustyn (Poland)

=== Final ===
28 July 2019
16:00

France	2–1	Germany
Baltimore 13'; Lakrar 73'	Report	Anyomi 6'

St Mirren Park, Paisley
Attendance: 1,135
Referee: Ivana Projkovska (Macedonia)

== Goalscorers ==
There were 49 goals scored in 15 matches, for an average of 3.27 goals per match.

4 goals

- (France) Melvine Malard

3 goals

- (France) Vicki Becho
- (Germany) Nicole Anyomi
- (Germany) Melissa Kössler
- (Norway) Emilie Bragstad

2 goals

- (France) Sandy Baltimore
- (France) Naomie Feller
- (Germany) Paulina Krumbiegel
- (Netherlands) Lisa Doorn
- (Netherlands) Joëlle Smits
- (Netherlands) Jonna van de Velde

1 goal

- (England) Jessica Naz
- (England) Ebony Salmon
- (France) Lorena Azzaro
- (France) Maëlle Lakrar
- (Germany) Lisa Ebert
- (Germany) Shekiera Martinez
- (Germany) Marie Müller
- (Netherlands) Jill Baijings
- (Netherlands) Romée Leuchter
- (Netherlands) Marisa Olislagers
- (Netherlands) Kirsten van de Westeringh
- (Netherlands) Lynn Wilms
- (Norway) Sara Hørte
- (Norway) Anna Jøsendal
- (Norway) Rikke Nygård
- (Norway) Jenny Olsen
- (Scotland) Emma Craig
- (Spain) Laia Aleixandri
- (Spain) Olga Carmona
- (Spain) Athenea del Castillo
- (Spain) Clàudia Pina

== Team of the tournament ==
The UEFA technical observers selected the following 11 players for the team of the tournament:

Goalkeeper	Defenders	Midfielders	Forwards	Substitutes
(France) Justine Lerond	(Germany) Laura Donhauser; (Germany) Sophia Kleinherne; (Spain) Laia Aleixandri; (France) Maëlle Lakrar	(Netherlands) Romée Leuchter; (Spain) Rosa Márquez; (Germany) Marie Müller; (France) Sandy Baltimore	(Germany) Nicole Anyomi; (France) Melvine Malard	(Spain) Cata Coll; (Germany) Lisa Ebert; (France) Julie Dufour; (Spain) Anna Torrodà; (Germany) Leonie Köster; (Norway) Olaug Tvedten; (Germany) Paulina Krumbiegel; (Spain) Eva Navarro; (England) Jessica Naz

== Qualified teams for FIFA U-20 Women's World Cup ==
The following four teams from UEFA would have qualified for the 2020 FIFA U-20 Women's World Cup before the tournament was cancelled.

Team	Qualified on	Previous appearances in FIFA U-20 Women's World Cup^{1}
Germany	19 July 2019	9 (2002, **2004**, 2006, 2008, **2010**, 2012, **2014**, 2016, 2018)
Spain	19 July 2019	3 (2004, 2016, 2018)
France	22 July 2019	7 (2002, 2006, 2008, 2010, 2014, 2016, 2018)
Netherlands	22 July 2019	1 (2018)

^{1} Bold indicates champions for that year. Italic indicates hosts for that year.

== International Broadcasters ==
=== Television ===
Up to all 16 live matches and highlights are available on UEFA.tv for all territories around the world.

Note : Live matches on UEFA.tv is not available in UK (Scotland as host, England as participants, and both non-participants (NI and Wales)) (matches not shown on BBC only), France, Germany, Israel, MENA, and USA.

==== Participating nations ====
Country	Broadcaster
**Scotland** **(host)**	**BBC**
England	**BBC**
Belgium	VRT (Dutch)
Belgium	RTBF (French)
France	L'Équipe
Germany	Sport1
Netherlands	NOS
Norway	NRK
Spain	RTVE

==== Non-participating European nations ====
Country/Region	Broadcaster
Albania	RTSH
Andorra	RTVE (Spanish)
Andorra	L'Équipe (French)
Luxembourg	L'Équipe (French)
Luxembourg	RTBF (French)
Luxembourg	VRT (Dutch)
Armenia	APMTV
Austria	ORF
Belarus	Belteleradio
Bosnia and Herzegovina; Croatia; Macedonia; Montenegro; Serbia; Slovenia	Sport Klub
Bulgaria	BNT
Czech Republic	ČT
Denmark	DR
Faroe Islands	DR
Estonia	ERR
Finland	Yle
Hungary	MTVA
Iceland	RÚV
Ireland	RTÉ
Israel	Charlton
Italy	RAI
San Marino	RAI
Vatican City	RAI
Kosovo	RTK
Latvia	LTV
Liechtenstein	SRG SSR
Switzerland	SRG SSR
Lithuania	LRT
Malta	PBS
Northern Ireland	BBC
Poland	TVP
Portugal	RTP
Romania	TVR
Russia	Match TV
Slovakia	RTVS
Sweden	SVT
Turkey	TRT
Ukraine	UA:PBC
Wales	BBC

==== Outside Europe ====
Country/Regional	Broadcaster
China	CCTV
Argentina; Bolivia; Chile; Colombia; Costa Rica; Dominican Republic; Ecuador; El Salvador; Guatemala; Honduras; Mexico; Nicaragua; Panama; Paraguay; Peru; Puerto Rico; Uruguay; Venezuela	ESPN; Univision Deportes (Puerto Rico and USA only)
United States	ESPN; Univision Deportes (Puerto Rico and USA only)
Algeria; Bahrain; Chad; Comoros; Djibouti; Egypt; Iran; Iraq; Jordan; Kuwait; Lebanon; Libya; Mauritania; Morocco; Oman; Qatar; Saudi Arabia; Somalia; Palestine; Sudan; Syria; Tunisia; United Arab Emirates; Yemen	beIN Sports
Iran	Varzesh TV Farsi

=== Radio ===
==== Participating nations ====
Country	Broadcaster
**United Kingdom** **(host)**	**BBC**
Belgium	VRT (Dutch)
Belgium	RTBF (French)
Germany	Sport1
Netherlands	NOS
Norway	NRK
Spain	RTVE

==== Non-participating European nations ====
Country/Region	Broadcaster
Albania	RTSH
Andorra	RTVE (Spanish)
Armenia	HR
Austria	ORF
Belarus	Belteleradio
Bulgaria	BNR
Czech Republic	ČR
Denmark	DR
Faroe Islands	DR
Estonia	ERR
Finland	Yle
Hungary	MTVA
Iceland	RÚV
Ireland	RTÉ
Italy	RAI
San Marino	RAI
Vatican City	RAI
Kosovo	RTK
Latvia	LR
Liechtenstein	SRG SSR
Switzerland	SRG SSR
Lithuania	LRT
Luxembourg	VRT (Dutch)
Luxembourg	RTBF (French)
Malta	PBS
Poland	PR
Portugal	RTP
Romania	RR
Slovakia	RTVS
Sweden	SR
Turkey	TRT
Ukraine	UA:PBC

==== Outside Europe ====
Country/Regional	Broadcaster
China	CRI
Latin American countries: Argentina; Bolivia; Chile; Colombia; Costa Rica; Dominican Republic; Ecuador; El Salvador; Guatemala; Honduras; Mexico; Nicaragua; Panama; Paraguay; Peru; Puerto Rico; Uruguay; Venezuela	ESPN; Univision (Puerto Rico and USA only)
United States	ESPN; Univision (Puerto Rico and USA only)
