= Reut (disambiguation) =

Reut is a municipality in the district of Rottal-Inn, Bavaria, Germany.

Reut may also refer to:

== Human name ==
- Fyodor Reut Soviet and later Russian military officer
- Przemysław Reut (born 1969), Polish filmmaker
- Reut Naggar, Israeli producer, cultural entrepreneur and social activist
- Reut Michaeli, Israeli footballer

== Other ==
- Răut River, Moldova
- Reut. is a taxonomic abbreviation for the botanist George François Reuter
- Reut Group non-profit policy think tank and Israeli lobby organization in Tel Aviv
