= Zala Vindišar =

Slovenian footballer

Personal information
- Date of birth: 31 May 2000 (age 26)
- Position: Forward

Team information
- Current team: Olimpija Ljubljana
- Number: 15

Youth career
- 2015–2017: Radomlje

Senior career*
Years	Team	Apps	(Gls)
2016–2018	Radomlje	30	(9)
2018–	Olimpija Ljubljana	46	(20)

International career^{‡}
2015–2017	Slovenia U17	8	(2)
2017–2019	Slovenia U19	9	(3)
2019–	Slovenia	3	(2)
- * Club domestic league appearances and goals as of 22 May 2021. ‡ National team caps and goals as of 23 February 2021.

Zala Vindišar (born 31 May 2000) is a Slovenian footballer who plays as a forward for ŽNK Olimpija Ljubljana and the Slovenia women's national team.

== Club career ==
Vindišar has played for ŽNK Radomlje and Olimpija Ljubljana in Slovenia.

== International career ==
Vindišar made her senior debut for Slovenia on 21 January 2019 as an 87th-minute substitution during a 4–0 friendly away win over Montenegro.
