= Elisa Polli =

Italian footballer (born 2000)

Personal information
- Date of birth: 27 August 2000 (age 26)
- Place of birth: Sassoferrato, Italy
- Height: 1.72 m (5 ft 8 in)
- Position: Striker

Team information
- Current team: Inter Milan
- Number: 9

Senior career*
Years	Team	Apps	(Gls)
2014–2017	Jesina	18	(8)
2017–2020	Tavagnacco	33	(5)
2020–2021	Empoli	13	(7)
2021–	Inter Milan	99	(27)

International career^{‡}
2022–	Italy	5	(1)
- * Club domestic league appearances and goals as of 16 May 2026 ‡ National team caps and goals as of 9 October 2026

Elisa Polli (born 27 August 2000) is an Italian professional footballer who plays as a Striker for Serie A club Inter Milan and the Italy women's national team.

== Club Career ==
On 19 July 2021, Polli joined Inter Milan.

== Career statistics ==
=== International ===
As of match played 9 October 2026

Appearances and goals by national team and year
National team	Year	Apps	Goals
Italy	2022	3	0
Italy	2025	1	0
Italy	2026	1	1
Total		5	1

Scores and results list Italy's goal tally first, score column indicates score after each Polli goal.

List of international goals scored by Elisa Polli
No.	Date	Venue	Opponent	Score	Result	Competition
1	9 October 2026	David Petriashvili Stadium, Tbilisi, Georgia	Belarus	0–2	0–2	2027 FIFA World Cup qualification

== Honours ==
EDP Jesina

- Serie B: 2015-16
