= Arailym Orynbassarova =

Kazakhstani footballer

Personal information
- Date of birth: 6 June 2000 (age 26)
- Position: Defender

International career^{‡}
Years	Team	Apps	(Gls)
- Kazakhstan
- ‡ National team caps and goals as of 19:40, 30 August 2019 (UTC)

Arailym Orynbassarova (Russian: Арайлым Орынбасарова; born 6 June 2000) is a Kazakhstani footballer who plays as a defender and has appeared for the Kazakhstan women's national team.

== Career ==
Orynbassarova has been capped for the Kazakhstan national team, appearing for the team during the 2019 FIFA Women's World Cup qualifying cycle.
