= Lorena Azzaro =

French footballer (born 2000)

Personal information
- Date of birth: 22 October 2000 (age 26)
- Place of birth: Foix, France
- Height: 1.69 m (5 ft 7 in)
- Position: Forward

Team information
- Current team: Charlton Athletic (on loan from Paris FC)
- Number: 9

Youth career
- 2011–2015: Toulouse
- 2015–2018: Lyon

Senior career*
Years	Team	Apps	(Gls)
2018–2019	Lyon	1	(0)
2019–2020	Fleury	3	(0)
2020–2024	Lille	68	(29)
2024–2025	Strasbourg	22	(6)
2025–	Paris FC	19	(8)
2026–	→ Charlton Athletic (loan)	1	(0)

International career
2018–2019	France U19	13	(2)
2019–2020	France U20	4	(1)
Medal record
Women's football
Representing France
UEFA Women's Under-19 Championship
Winner	2019 Scotland
- * Club domestic league appearances and goals as of 6 September 2026

Lorena Azzaro (born 22 October 2000) is a French professional footballer who plays as a forward for Women's Super League club Charlton Athletic, on loan from Première Ligue club Paris FC.

== Club career ==
Azzaro spent her youth career with Toulouse and Lyon. She made her professional debut for Lyon as a 72-nd minute substitute for Ada Hegerberg in a 5–0 league win against Metz on 27 Octobter 2018.

On 14 October 2019, Azzaro joined Fleury on a two-year contract. Less than 11 months later in September 2020, she moved to Lille. After spending four seasons with Lille, she left the club in July 2024. During the same month, she joined newly promoted Première Ligue club Strasbourg.

On 30 May 2025, Paris FC announced that Azzaro would join the club on 1 July after signing a three-year contract. She made her debut for the club on 6 September 2025 by scoring both goals in a 2–0 league win against Dijon.

In July 2026, Azzaro joined newly promoted Women's Super League club Charlton Athletic on a season-long loan.

== International career ==
Azzaro has represented France at youth level. She was part of France under-19 team which won the 2019 UEFA Women's Under-19 Championship.

== Honours ==
Lyon

- Première Ligue: 2018–19

France U19

- UEFA Women's Under-19 Championship: 2019
