= Constance Brackman =

Belgian footballer

Personal information
- Date of birth: 20 October 2001 (age 25)
- Place of birth: Rhisnes, Belgium
- Position: Defender

Team information
- Current team: Nantes
- Number: 20

Youth career
- 2007–2016: RFC Rhisnois
- 2016–2018: Standard Liège

Senior career*
Years	Team	Apps	(Gls)
2018–2026	Standard Liège	145	(1)
2026–	Nantes	0	(0)

International career^{‡}
2016	Belgium U15	1	(0)
2017	Belgium U16	5	(0)
2017–2018	Belgium U17	5	(0)
2018–2019	Belgium U19	17	(1)
2021–2025	Belgium U23	15	(0)
2021–	Belgium	3	(0)
- * Club domestic league appearances and goals as of 29 July 2026 (UTC) ‡ National team caps and goals as of 39 July 2026 (UTC)

Constance Brackman (born 20 October 2001) is a Belgian footballer who plays as a defender for Nantes and the Belgium national team.

== Club career ==
She began playing football at the age of five and a half with RFC Rhinois, a small boys' club in her hometown. She quickly established herself at youth level and, shortly after receiving her first call-up to the Belgium under-15 national team, was approached by scouts from Standard Liège. She initially declined the offer, choosing to remain with her boys' team, before eventually joining Standard's youth academy in 2016 at the age of 14.

Initially assigned to the club's under-16 side, she progressed through every level of Standard's youth system before being promoted to the first team towards the end of the 2017–18 season. She made her senior debut on 17 April 2018 in the final regular-season match of the Belgian Women's Super League against KAA Gent. On 31 May, she was also part of the team that won the Women's Belgian Cup against Genk, providing the assist for Sanne Schoenmakers' goal that sealed a 2–0 victory.

Following her senior debut in the spring of 2018 and the club's Belgian Women's Cup triumph later that year, Brackman became a permanent member of Standard's first-team squad. Over the following seasons, she featured with increasing regularity, helping the club remain among the leading teams in the Belgian Women's Super League. She gradually established herself as one of Standard's key defenders, becoming a regular starter in central defence. In 2023, she won her second cup with the club and, beginning with the 2022–23 season, completed three consecutive league campaigns without missing a single match. During that period, she surpassed 100 appearances for Standard and became one of the club's most prominent players.

After spending almost a decade at Standard, Brackman moved to France in the summer of 2026, signing a two-year contract with Nantes.

== International career ==
Brackman first represented Belgium at international level in 2016, when she received her first call-up to the under-15 national team at the age of 15. She subsequently progressed through every level of Belgium's youth national team system, representing the under-16, under-17, under-19 and under-23 teams, and took part in several international competitions. Among them was the 2019 UEFA Women's Under-19 Championship, held in Scotland, where Belgium were eliminated in the group stage after losing all three of their matches.

Brackman made her senior debut for the Belgium women's national football team on 10 June 2021, coming on as a substitute for Isabelle Iliano in a match against Spain.
