= Justine Lerond =

French footballer (born 2000)

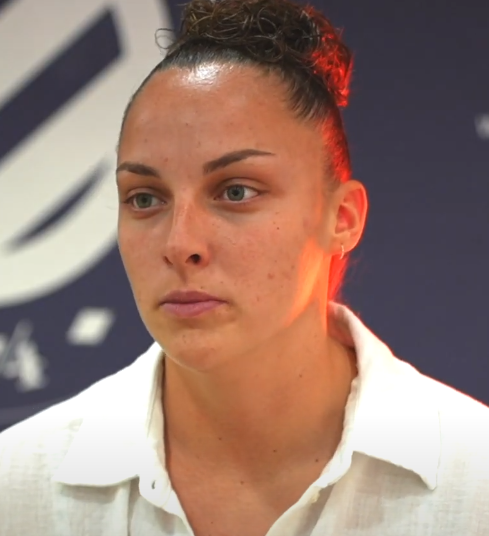
- Lerond in 2024

Personal information
- Date of birth: 29 February 2000 (age 26)
- Place of birth: Metz, France
- Height: 1.69 m (5 ft 7 in)
- Position: Goalkeeper

Team information
- Current team: Montpellier
- Number: 1

Youth career
- 2007–2012: MJC Volmerange-lès-Boulay
- 2012–2013: CA Boulay
- 2013–2015: APM Metz
- 2015–2016: Metz

Senior career*
| Years | Team | Apps | (Gls) |
| 2016–2022 | Metz | 82 | (0) |
| 2022–2024 | Bordeaux | 22 | (0) |
| 2024– | Montpellier | 27 | (0) |

International career
| 2015–2016 | France U16 | 10 | (0) |
| 2017 | France U17 | 7 | (0) |
| 2017–2019 | France U19 | 20 | (0) |
| 2017–2020 | France U20 | 6 | (0) |
| 2021–2022 | France U23 | 3 | (0) |
Medal record
Women's football
Representing France
UEFA Women's Under-19 Championship
| Winner | 2019 Scotland |
- * Club domestic league appearances and goals as of 14 January 2026

Justine Lerond (born 29 February 2000) is a French professional footballer who plays as a goalkeeper for Première Ligue club Montpellier.

== Club career ==
Lerond joined Metz in 2015 and went on to become team's first-choice goalkeeper. On 10 August 2022, Bordeaux announced the signing of Lerond on a two-year deal until June 2024.

On 8 July 2024, Lerond joined Montpellier.

== International career ==
Lerond was also part of the French team at the 2022 European Championships. Lerond has also represented the U20 France national team.

== Career statistics ==
As of match played 4 November 2022

Appearances and goals by club, season and competition
| Club | Season | League | | | Cup | | Continental | | Total | |
| Club | Season | Division | Apps | Goals | Apps | Goals | Apps | Goals | Apps | Goals |
|---|---|---|---|---|---|---|---|---|---|---|
| Metz | 2015–16 | D2F | 0 | 0 | 2 | 0 | — | | 2 | 0 |
| Metz | 2016–17 | D1F | 8 | 0 | 2 | 0 | — | | 10 | 0 |
| Metz | 2017–18 | D2F | 13 | 0 | 1 | 0 | — | | 14 | 0 |
| Metz | 2018–19 | D1F | 20 | 0 | 1 | 0 | — | | 21 | 0 |
| Metz | 2019–20 | D1F | 16 | 0 | 2 | 0 | — | | 18 | 0 |
| Metz | 2020–21 | D2F | 3 | 0 | 0 | 0 | — | | 3 | 0 |
| Metz | 2021–22 | D2F | 22 | 0 | 0 | 0 | — | | 22 | 0 |
| Metz | Total | | 82 | 0 | 8 | 0 | 0 | 0 | 90 | 0 |
| Bordeaux | 2022–23 | D1F | 3 | 0 | 0 | 0 | — | | 3 | 0 |
| Career total | | | 85 | 0 | 8 | 0 | 0 | 0 | 93 | 0 |

== Honours ==
Metz

- Division 2 Féminine: 2017–18

France U19

- UEFA Women's Under-19 Championship: 2019

Individual

- UEFA Women's Under-17 Championship team of the tournament: 2017
- UEFA Women's Under-19 Championship team of the tournament: 2019
