= Melissa Bellucci =

Italian footballer (born 2001)

Personal information
- Date of birth: 8 February 2001 (age 25)
- Place of birth: Pedaso, Italy
- Position: Central midfielder

Team information
- Current team: Napoli
- Number: 23

Youth career
- Pedaso 1969
- 2016–2017: Jesina
- 2018–2020: Juventus

Senior career*
Years	Team	Apps	(Gls)
2017–2018	Jesina		
2018–2025	Juventus	7	(0)
2020–2022	→ Empoli (loan)	40	(0)
2022–2023	→ Sassuolo (loan)	22	(0)
2024	→ Fiorentina (loan)	7	(0)
2024–2025	→ Napoli (loan)	23	(1)
2025–	Napoli	22	(0)

International career
2017–2018	Italy U17	9	(2)
2018–2019	Italy U19	7	(4)
2021–	Italy	2	(0)
- * Club domestic league appearances and goals as of 17 May 2026

Melissa Bellucci (born 8 February 2001) is an Italian professional footballer who plays as a midfielder for Serie A club Napoli.

== Career ==
Belluci started playing football in Pedaso 1969, a males' football team in which she was the only female on the team. She moved to Jesina in 2016. Bellucci moved to Juventus in 2018. She made her first appearance for Juventus on 23 September, in a 6–0 victory against Verona. In 2020, she moved to Empoli.

On 13 July 2025, Belluci joined Napoli on a permanent deal.

== International career ==
On 14 June 2021, she made her first appearance for Italy in a 3–2 victory against Austria.
