= Lisa Martinez (footballer) =

French footballer (born 2000)

Personal information
- Full name: Lisa Viviane Martinez-Douarche
- Date of birth: 13 June 2000 (age 26)
- Place of birth: Montpellier, France
- Height: 5 ft 8 in (1.73 m)
- Position: Defender

Team information
- Current team: Saint-Étienne
- Number: 6

Youth career
- 2011–2018: Montpellier

Senior career*
Years	Team	Apps	(Gls)
2018–2020	Montpellier	3	(0)
2019–2020	Rangers		
2020–2021	Metz	2	(0)
2021–2022	Soyaux	5	(0)
2022–2024	Rangers	16	(6)
2024-	Saint-Étienne	18	(1)

International career^{‡}
2016–2017	France U17	6	(0)
2018–2019	France U19	17	(1)
2020	France U20	2	(0)
- * Club domestic league appearances and goals as of 2 October 2025 ‡ National team caps and goals as of 27 September 2020

Lisa Viviane Martinez-Douarche (born 13 June 2000) is a French footballer who currently plays as a defender for Saint-Étienne in the Première Ligue.

== Career ==
Martinez started her career at Montpellier Hérault Sport Club. In 2018 she was part of the team that won the French Under 19 League. She made her debut in the first division during 2018-19 season and signed her first professional contract on 19 June 2019. She joined Rangers 8 September 2019 initially until January 2020 but the loan was extended until June 2020. She returned to France and signed with second division team FC Metz for season 2020–21. The following year she joined first division team ASJ Soyaux-Charente. On 4 August 2022 Martinez returned to Rangers.

== International career ==
Martinez represented France at Under-17 level six times and Under-19 level 17 times, scoring 1 goal, including five games at the 2019 European Under-19 Championship which was won by France. She also played twice for the Under-20 team.

== Honours ==
=== Club ===
Montpellier

- French U19 Championship: 2018-19

Rangers

- Scottish Women's Premier League Cup: 2022

=== International ===
- European Under 19 Championship : 2019
