= Kaja Korošec =

Slovenian footballer (born 2001)

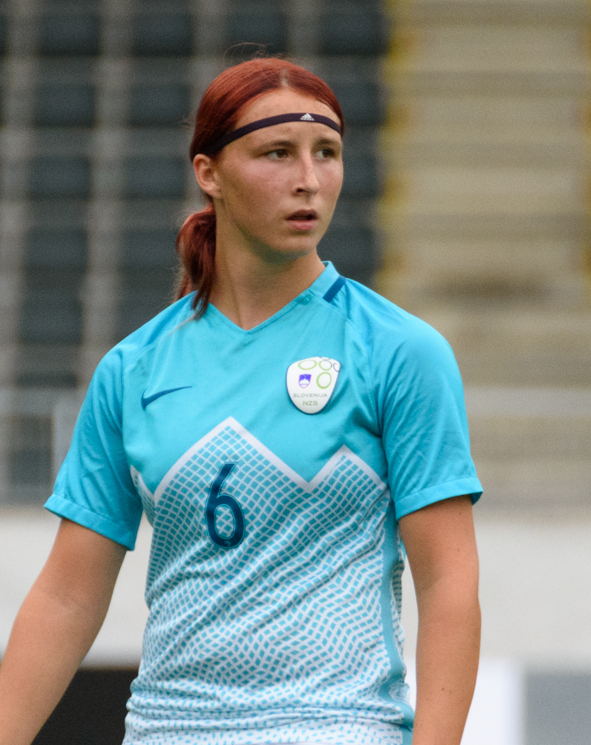
- Korošec with Slovenia in 2018

Personal information
- Date of birth: 17 November 2001 (age 24)
- Place of birth: Slovenska Bistrica, Slovenia
- Position: Midfielder

Team information
- Current team: Paris FC
- Number: 4

Youth career
- Bistrica

Senior career*
Years	Team	Apps	(Gls)
2018–2023	Pomurje / Mura	89	(87)
2023–	Paris FC	60	(4)

International career^{‡}
2017–	Slovenia	71	(7)
- * Club domestic league appearances and goals as of 18 April 2026 ‡ National team caps and goals as of 13 October 2026

Kaja Korošec (born 17 November 2001) is a Slovenian footballer who plays as a midfielder for Paris FC and the Slovenia women's national team.

== Club career ==
Korošec made her first senior appearance for Pomurje in the 2017–18 season, going on to make four league appearances in that campaign. On 21 October 2018, she scored her first league goal for the club in a 15–1 victory over Ajdovščina. The 2018–19 season brought Korošec her first league title, and also won the double after winning the Slovenian Cup. Korošec scored 8 goals in 21 appearances across the course of the season to help ensure success.

In August 2019, Korošec made her UEFA Women's Champions League debut as Pomurje faced Cardiff Met. On 18 November 2020, she scored a hat-trick in the Champions League match against Hungarian champions Ferencváros as Pomurje advanced to the round of 32.

== International career ==
Korošec has been capped for the Slovenia national team, first appearing for the team during the 2019 FIFA Women's World Cup qualifying cycle. Her first competitive appearance came in November 2017 in a 5–0 victory over Faroe Islands shortly after her 16th birthday.

On 4 October 2019, Korošec scored her first international goal in a 4–2 defeat against the Netherlands in the UEFA Women's Euro 2022 qualifiers.

== Honours ==
Pomurje / Mura

- Slovenian League: 2018–19, 2020–21, 2021–22, 2022–23
- Slovenian Cup: 2017–18, 2018–19, 2022–23

Paris FC

- Coupe de France Féminine: 2024–25
