= Teodora Dimoska =

Macedonian footballer

Personal information
- Date of birth: 29 September 2000 (age 26)
- Position: Forward

Team information
- Current team: Tiverija

Senior career*
Years	Team	Apps	(Gls)
- Tiverija

International career^{‡}
2015–2016	Macedonia U17	5	(0)
2017–2018	Macedonia U19	6	(3)
2019–	North Macedonia	6	(0)
- * Club domestic league appearances and goals ‡ National team caps and goals as of 27 November 2020

Teodora Dimoska (Macedonian: Теодора Димоска; born 29 September 2000) is a Macedonian footballer who plays as a forward for 1. liga club ŽFK Tiverija Istatov and the North Macedonia women's national team.
