= Laura Žemberyová =

Slovak footballer (born 2001)

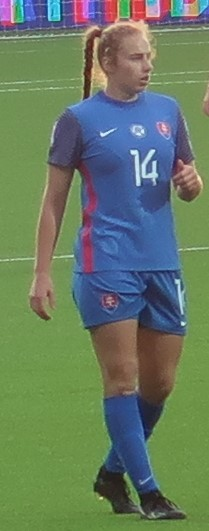
- Žemberyová with Slovakia in 2023

Personal information
- Date of birth: 20 August 2001 (age 25)
- Place of birth: Prešov, Slovakia
- Height: 1.69 m (5 ft 7 in)
- Position: Midfielder

Team information
- Current team: Pogoń Szczecin
- Number: 9

Youth career
- 2010–2018: Tatran Prešov

College career
Years	Team	Apps	(Gls)
2021–2023	UAB Blazers		
2023–2025	Cincinnati Bearcats		

Senior career*
Years	Team	Apps	(Gls)
2018–2019	Lokomotiva Brno H. H.		
2019–2020	Slavia Prague	17	(5)
2026	Tatran Prešov		
2026–	Pogoń Szczecin	0	(0)

International career^{‡}
2016	Slovakia U17	3	(1)
2017–2019	Slovakia U19	12	(2)
2020–	Slovakia	27	(0)
- * Club domestic league appearances and goals as of 11:58, 10 July 2026 (UTC) ‡ National team caps and goals as of 11:58, 10 July 2026 (UTC)

Laura Žemberyová (born 20 August 2001) is a Slovak professional footballer who plays as a midfielder for Ekstraliga club Pogoń Szczecin and the Slovakia women's national team.

== Club career ==
Žemberyová has played for Slavia Prague in the Czech Republic at the UEFA Women's Champions League.

On 9 July 2026, Žemberyová signed a two-year contract with Ekstraliga club Pogoń Szczecin.

== College career ==
In January 2021, Žemberyová was added to the UAB Blazers roster.

In her first season at UAB, she led all C-USA freshmen with five assists and all C-USA players with six multiple point matches. For her efforts, she was named to the 2020 Conference USA First Team All-Freshman. The following season she was named to the 2021 C-USA All-Conference Second Team as well as the NCAA D1 South Region Third Team.

== International career ==
Žemberyová capped for Slovakia at senior level during the UEFA Women's Euro 2022 qualifying.
