= Kelly Brady (footballer) =

Irish footballer (born 2002)

Personal information
- Full name: Kelly Morgan Brady
- Date of birth: 5 March 2002 (age 24)
- Place of birth: United States
- Position: Forward

Team information
- Current team: Glasgow City

College career
Years	Team	Apps	(Gls)
2020–2022	Central Connecticut Blue Devils	42	(13)
2023–2024	Ole Miss Rebels	35	(12)

Senior career*
Years	Team	Apps	(Gls)
2025–2026	Athlone Town	22	(21)
2026	Crystal Palace	2	(0)
2026–	Glasgow City	7	(5)
- * Club domestic league appearances and goals as of 14 October 2026

Kelly Morgan Brady (born 5 March 2002) is a footballer who plays as a forward for Scottish Women's Premier League club Glasgow City. Born in the United States, she has been called up to represent the Republic of Ireland internationally.

== Early life ==
Brady was born on 5 March 2002 in the United States to Gerry and Mary. Growing up, she played Gaelic football. After that, she attended Central Connecticut State University in the United States. Following her stint there, she attended the University of Mississippi in the United States.

== Career ==
Ahead of the 2025 season, Brady signed for Irish side Athlone Town, helping the club win the league title and the 2025 FAI Women's Cup. During the 2025 season, she was the top scorer of the 2025 League of Ireland Women's Premier Division with twenty-one goals.

On 11 January 2026, Brady joined Crystal Palace on a one and a half year contract. In July 2026, Brady departed Crystal Palace and joined SWPL side Glasgow City.

== Honours ==
=== Athlone Town ===
- LOI Women's Premier Division, 2025
- FAI Women's Cup, 2025
