= Silvia Rubio =

Spanish footballer (born 2000)

Personal information
- Full name: Silvia Rubio Ávila
- Date of birth: 12 October 2000 (age 26)
- Place of birth: Madrid, Spain
- Height: 1.63 m (5 ft 4 in)
- Position: Midfielder

Youth career
- 2014–2017: Madrid CFF

Senior career*
Years	Team	Apps	(Gls)
2017–2022	Madrid CFF	115	(4)
2022–2025	AC Milan	36	(1)

International career^{‡}
2016	Spain U17	11	(2)
2018	Spain U20	1	(0)
2019	Spain U19	7	(2)
2021	Spain U23	1	(0)
- * Club domestic league appearances and goals as of 06:42, 21 December 2025 (UTC) ‡ National team caps and goals as of 05:31, 23 December 2023 (UTC)

Silvia Rubio Ávila (born 12 October 2000) is a Spanish footballer who plays as a midfielder.

== Club career ==
Rubio started her career at Madrid CFF.
