= Lena Uebach =

German association football player

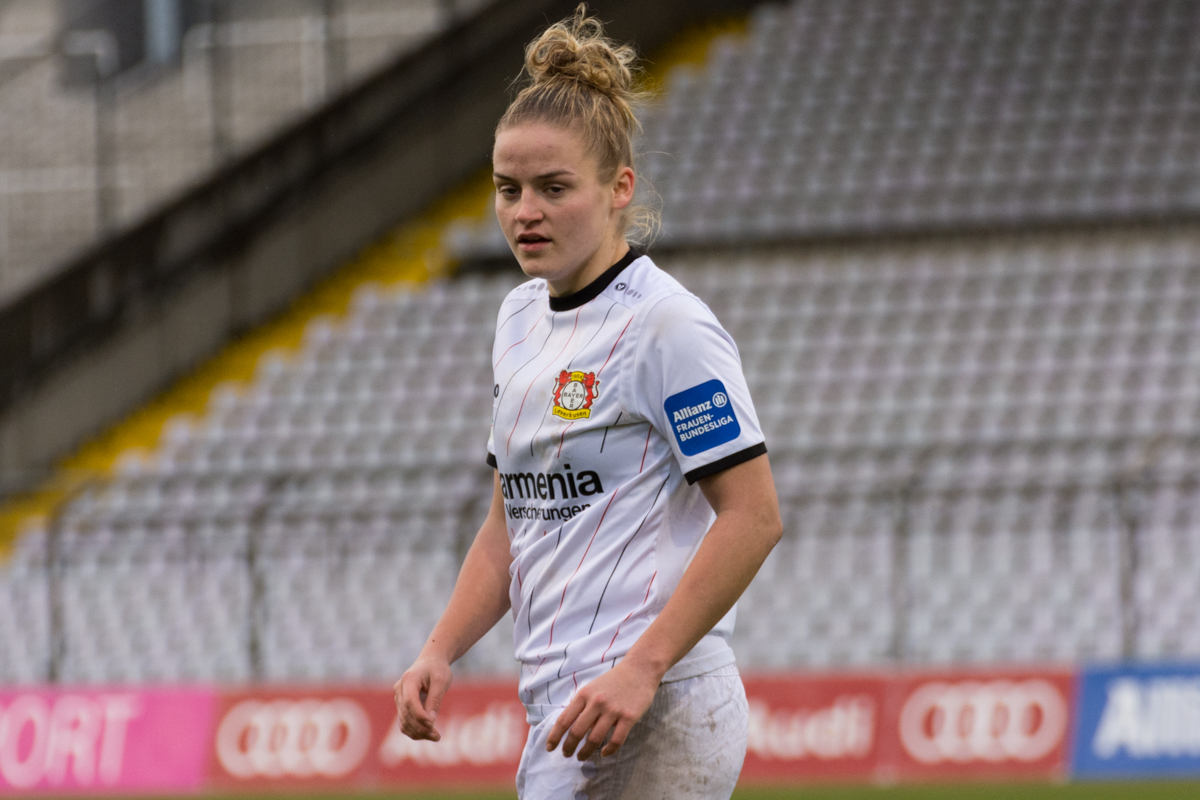
- Lena Uebach playing for 1. FC Köln in 2022.

Personal information
- Full name: Lena Sophie Uebach
- Date of birth: 31 July 2000 (age 26)
- Place of birth: Kirchen, Germany
- Height: 1.68 m (5 ft 6 in)
- Position: Midfielder

Lena Sophie Uebach (born 31 July 2000) is a retired German footballer who plays for 1. FC Köln. Uebach has previously played for Bayer Leverkusen.

== International career ==
Uebach has represented Germany at youth level.
