= Lisa Petry =

Belgian footballer

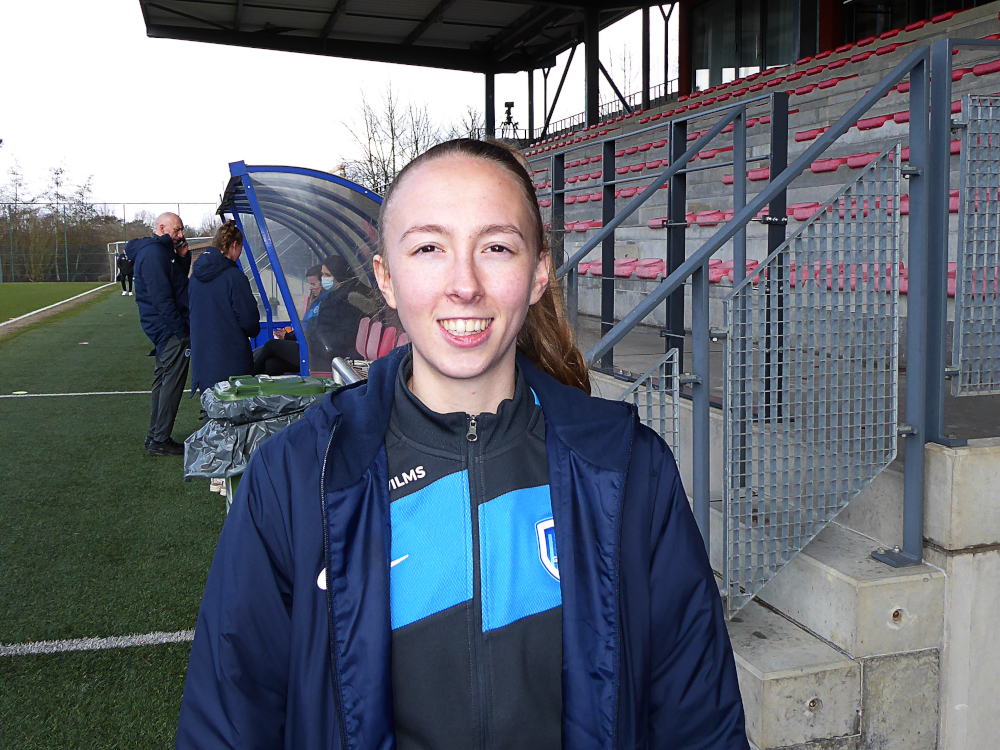
- Petry in 2022

Personal information
- Date of birth: 12 February 2001 (age 25)
- Place of birth: Belgium
- Height: 1.80 m (5 ft 11 in)
- Position: Forward

Team information
- Current team: Genk
- Number: 9

Senior career*
Years	Team	Apps	(Gls)
2016-2021	Standard Liège	40	(9)
2021–2025	Genk	83	(37)
2025-	Club YLA		

International career^{‡}
2016–2018	Belgium U17	13	(5)
2017–2019	Belgium U19	19	(7)
2020–	Belgium	2	(0)
- * Club domestic league appearances and goals as of 16 July 2023 (UTC) ‡ National team caps and goals as of 7 March 2020

Lisa Petry (born 12 February 2001) is a Belgian footballer who plays as a forward for Women's Super League club Club YLA and the Belgium women's national team, after a long spell at KRC Genk.

== International career ==
At the start of 2022, Petry helped Belgium win the Pinatar Cup in Spain for the first time, beating Russia on penalties in the final after a 0–0 draw.

== Honours ==
Belgium

- Pinatar Cup: 2022
