= Christin Meyer =

German footballer (born 2000)

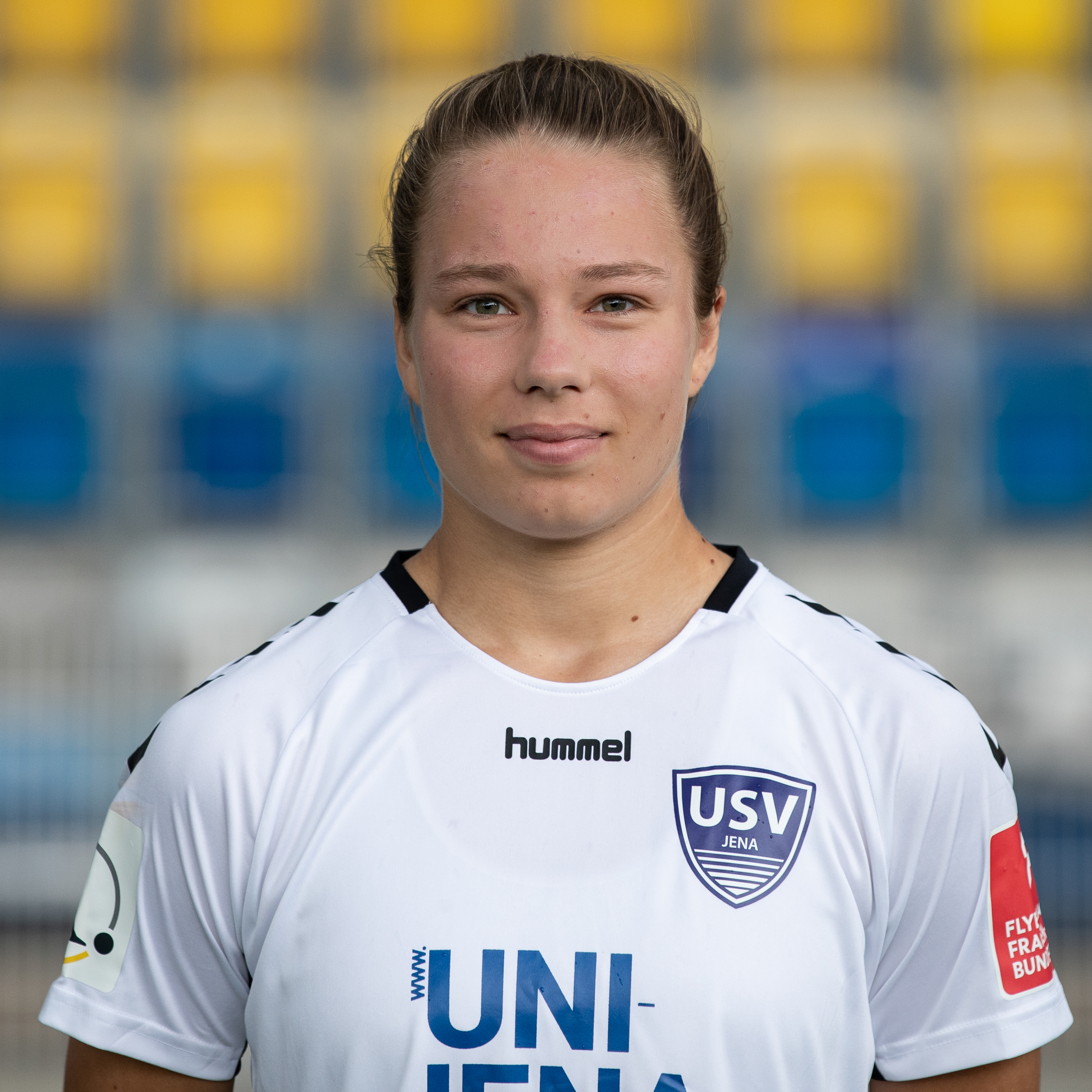
- Meyer in 2019

Personal information
- Full name: Christin Martina Ingrid Meyer
- Date of birth: 14 October 2000 (age 26)
- Place of birth: Germany
- Height: 1.78 m (5 ft 10 in)
- Position: Midfielder

Team information
- Current team: Viktoria Berlin
- Number: 9

Senior career*
Years	Team	Apps	(Gls)
2016–2018	SV Henstedt-Ulzburg	42	(11)
2019–2021	Carl Zeiss Jena	32	(8)
2021–2024	Werder Bremen	48	(2)
2024–2026	Hamburger SV	46	(9)
2026–	Viktoria Berlin	9	(5)

International career
2018–2019	Germany U19	10	(1)
- * Club domestic league appearances and goals as of 22 November 2026

Christin Meyer (born 14 October 2000) is a German footballer who plays as a midfielder for 2. Frauen-Bundesliga club Viktoria Berlin.
