= Reut Michaeli =

Israeli footballer

Personal information
- Date of birth: 17 April 2002 (age 24)
- Place of birth: Jerusalem, Israel
- Position: Midfielder

Team information
- Current team: Ramat HaSharon

Youth career
- 2015–2018: Hapoel Katamon Jerusalem

Senior career*
Years	Team	Apps	(Gls)
2019–2020	Ramat HaSharon		
2020	AEL Limassol		
2020–	Ramat HaSharon		

International career^{‡}
2017–2018	Israel U17	3	(0)
2020–	Israel	4	(0)
- * Club domestic league appearances and goals ‡ National team caps and goals as of 1 December 2021

Reut Michaeli (Hebrew: רות מיכאלי; born 17 April 2002) is an Israeli professional footballer who plays as a midfielder for the Israel women's national team.

== Career ==
She was scouted very young by the scouts of Hapoel Katamon Jerusalem She joined her academy in 2015 at just 13 years old.

She played in the men's sections of the professional club of Jerusalem until 2018.

In 2018, she joined the professional women's football club of the National Women's Football Academy. She made her first appearance in the women's professional football championship at just 16 years old.

After a season in the academy club, she joined Ramat HaSharon in 2019.

In September 2020, she left Israel to join AEL Limassol in Cyprus.

In November 2020, following poor working conditions, she terminated her contract to engage with Israeli club Ramat HaSharon.

== Honors ==
- Best revelation of the Israeli Women's Premier League 2019–2020
- Champion of the Israeli Women's Premier League 2018–2019
