= Sara Hørte =

Norwegian footballer (born 2000)

Personal information
- Full name: Sara Iren Lindbak Hørte
- Date of birth: 24 November 2000 (age 25)
- Height: 1.77 m (5 ft 10 in)
- Position: Defender

Team information
- Current team: Vålerenga
- Number: 2

Youth career
- KFUM Oslo

Senior career*
Years	Team	Apps	(Gls)
2015–2016	KFUM Oslo		
2016–2018	Øvrevoll Hosle	34	(6)
2019–2022	Kolbotn	64	(13)
2022–2024	Rosenborg	48	(9)
2024–	Vålerenga	27	(3)

International career^{‡}
2017–2019	Norway U19	10	(3)
2021–	Norway U23	9	(0)
2022–	Norway	5	(1)
- * Club domestic league appearances and goals as of 4 October 2025 ‡ National team caps and goals as of 27 October 2023

Sara Iren Lindbak Hørte (born 24 November 2000) is a Norwegian football player who plays for Vålerenga in Toppserien.

== Club career ==
Previously, she has played for KFUM Oslo in 4. division, before she moved to Øvrevoll Hosle in 2016. Before Toppserien 2019 started, Hørte moved to Kolbotn.

She signed for Rosenborg BK Kvinner in August 2022.

== International career ==
Hørte has played matches for the Norway youth nation team U19 and U23.

In 2019, she was part of the Norway squad in UEFA Under-19 Championship in Scotland.

She was called up for the Norway national team for the first time in August 2022. She debuted and scored her first goal in the FIFA World Cup qualification against Albania, 6 September 2022.

On 19 June 2023, she was included in the 23-player Norwegian squad for the 2023 FIFA Women's World Cup.

== International goals ==
Scores and results list Norway's goal tally first.

No.	Date	Venue	Opponent	Score	Result	Competition
1.	6 September 2022	Ullevaal Stadion, Oslo, Norway	Albania	5–0	5–0	2023 FIFA Women's World Cup qualification

== Honours ==
=== Club ===
Rosenborg

- Norwegian Cup: 2023
