= Marie Müller (footballer) =

German footballer (born 2000)

- Müller with the Portland Thorns in 2026

Personal information
- Full name: Marie Lena Müller
- Date of birth: 25 July 2000 (age 26)
- Place of birth: Dortmund, Germany
- Height: 1.68 m (5 ft 6 in)
- Positions: Full-back; winger

Team information
- Current team: Portland Thorns
- Number: 23

Youth career
- VfL Bochum
- 2016–2017: SC Freiburg

Senior career*
Years	Team	Apps	(Gls)
2018	SC Freiburg II	7	(2)
2018–2024	SC Freiburg	97	(9)
2024–	Portland Thorns	51	(3)

International career^{‡}
2016–2017	Germany U17	6	(2)
2018–2019	Germany U19	17	(5)
2019	Germany U20	1	(0)
2024–	Germany U23	4	(1)
2025–	Germany	3	(1)
- * Club domestic league appearances and goals as of 18:00, 11 November 2026 (UTC) ‡ National team caps and goals as of 13 October 2026 (UTC)

Marie Lena Müller (born 25 July 2000) is a German professional footballer who plays as a full-back or winger for the Portland Thorns of the National Women's Soccer League.

== Club career ==
Müller played as a midfielder for SC Freiburg, initially for its second team SC Freiburg II from 2018 to 2022, transitioning to the first team in the Frauen-Bundesliga where she played from 2021 through early 2024.

On 2 February 2024, it was announced that she had transferred to Portland Thorns FC of the National Women's Soccer League. On 30 April 2026, she scored her first NWSL goal in a 2–0 victory over the San Diego Wave.

== International career ==
Müller played for Germany at the U-17 FIFA Women’s World Cup and the UEFA U-19 Women’s Championship. While with the U-17 squad, Müller helped Germany win the 2016 UEFA U-17 Women’s Championship. She also made an appearance with the U-20 team.

== Career statistics ==
As of 13 October 2026

Appearances and goals by national team and year
National team	Year	Apps	Goals
Germany	2026	3	1
Total		3	1

Scores and results list Germany's goal tally first, score column indicates score after each Müller goal.

List of international goals scored by Marie Müller
No.	Date	Venue	Opponent	Score	Result	Competition
1	5 June 2026	RheinEnergieStadion, Cologne, Germany	Norway	1–0	2–0	2027 FIFA World Cup qualification
