= Paulina Krumbiegel =

German footballer (born 2000)

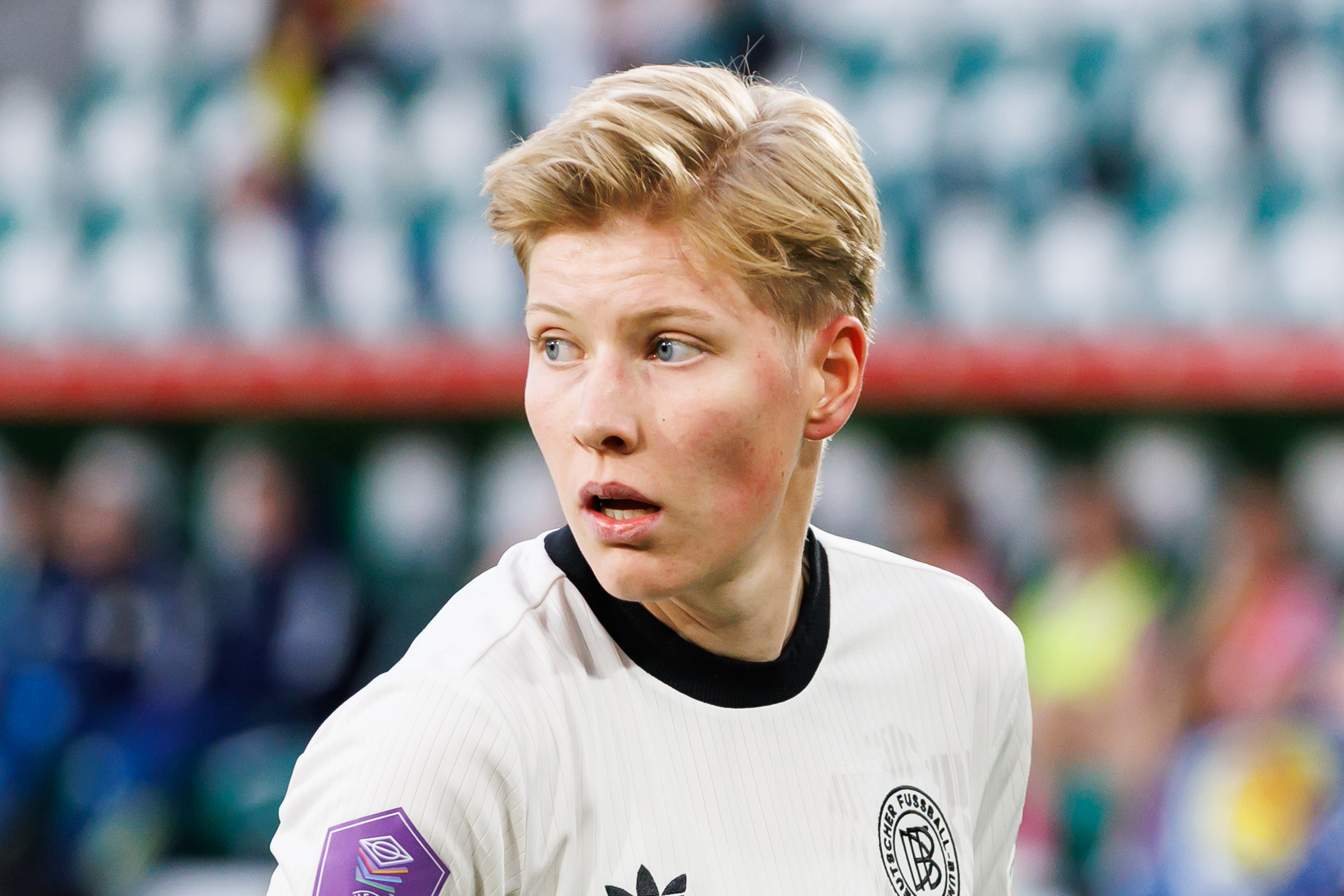
- Krumbiegel in 2025

Personal information
- Full name: Paulina Käte Krumbiegel
- Date of birth: 27 October 2000 (age 26)
- Place of birth: Mannheim, Germany
- Height: 1.74 m (5 ft 9 in)
- Positions: Winger; full-back

Team information
- Current team: Eintracht Frankfurt
- Number: 27

Youth career
- 2006–2010: TV Kindenheim
- 2010–2012: SC Siegelbach
- 2012–2016: TSG Hoffenheim

Senior career*
Years	Team	Apps	(Gls)
2016–2019	TSG Hoffenheim II	59	(13)
2019–2024	TSG Hoffenheim	66	(10)
2024–2026	Juventus	43	(5)
2026–	Eintracht Frankfurt	7	(0)

International career^{‡}
2016	Germany U16	4	(1)
2016–2017	Germany U17	8	(1)
2017–2019	Germany U19	19	(15)
2020–	Germany	11	(4)
- * Club domestic league appearances and goals as of 18 November 2026 ‡ National team caps and goals as of 16:07, 9 April 2025 (UTC)

Paulina Käte Krumbiegel (born 27 October 2000) is a German footballer who plays as a winger or full-back for Frauen-Bundesliga club Eintracht Frankfurt and the Germany national team. She has previously played domestically for TSG Hoffenheim and in Italy for Juventus.

== Club career ==
Krumbiegel started playing football at the age of six with her local club TV Kindenheim, winning with them the district championship. In 2010, she started playing with SC Siegelbach and won with them the district cup.

Krumbiegel joined TSG Hoffenheim at the age of eleven, initially playing for the under-15 and under-17 before debuting for TSG Hoffenheim II in 2016. She made 54 2. Frauen-Bundesliga appearances in three seasons. She was promoted to the senior squad for the 2019–20 Frauen-Bundesliga season and made her debut in September 2020. She played 65 league matches for the club, scoring 10 goals, as well as 10 DFB-Pokal Frauen matches. In August 2021, she tore her anterior cruciate ligament during training.

In May 2024, Krumbiegel signed with Italian Serie A club Juventus on a two-year contract for the 2024–25 and 2025–26 seasons. She became the first German woman to play for Juventus. In her time in Italy, Krumbiegel won multiple titles, including a domestic double.

On 11 May 2026, Krumbiegel was announced to be returning to Germany, signing a three-year contract with Eintracht Frankfurt.

== International career ==
In July 2018, Krumbiegel represented Germany under-19 at the 2018 UEFA Women's Under-19 Championship, finishing runners-up of the tournament after losing 1–0 to Spain in the final at Tissot Arena.

In September 2020, Krumbiegel was called-up for the first time for the German senior team. She was called-up together with Sandra Starke to replace Linda Dallmann and Kristin Demann who were withdrawn due to injury. She made her senior international debut that month, assisting two goals during a 3–0 victory over Montenegro in the UEFA Women's Euro 2021 qualifying stage. Two months later, she scored her debut senior international goal against Greece.

== Career statistics ==
=== International ===
As of 8 April 2025

Germany
Year	Apps	Goals
2020	2	1
2021	3	1
2022	2	1
2023	3	0
2025	1	0
Total	11	4

=== International goals ===
Scores and results list Germany's goal tally first:

Krumbiegel – goals for Germany
#	Date	Location	Opponent	Score	Result	Competition
1.	27 November 2020	Ingolstadt, Germany	Greece	6–0	6–0	UEFA Women's Euro 2021 qualifying
2.	13 April 2021	Wiesbaden, Germany	Norway	3–1	3–1	Friendly
3.	10 November 2022	Fort Lauderdale, United States	United States	2–1	2–1	Friendly
4.	25 June 2023	Offenbach, Germany	Vietnam	1–0	2–1	Friendly

== Style of play ==
Krumbiegel plays as a right-back, though she can also adapt to midfield allowing her to play as a winger or central midfielder.

== Personal life ==
Krumbiegel's brother, Felix, played football and she followed in his path. She was also trained three years by her father, Andreas. Krumbiegel studied speech therapy at the SRH University of Applied Sciences in Heidelberg.
