= Kirsten van de Westeringh =

Dutch footballer (born 2001)

Personal information
- Full name: Kirsten van de Westeringh
- Date of birth: 6 June 2001 (age 25)
- Place of birth: Netherlands
- Position: Midfielder

Team information
- Current team: Feyenoord
- Number: 10

Youth career
- Ajax

Senior career*
Years	Team	Apps	(Gls)
2018–2020	Ajax	7	(0)
2020–2021	Heerenveen	19	(6)
2021–2023	ADO Den Haag	22	(4)
2023–	Feyenoord	13	(1)

International career
2016	Netherlands U15	4	(1)
2016–2017	Netherlands U16	8	(0)
2016–2018	Netherlands U17	18	(8)
2018–2020	Netherlands U19	25	(19)
2021–2022	Netherlands U23	7	(1)
- * Club domestic league appearances and goals as of 17 May 2025

Kirsten van de Westeringh (born 6 June 2001) is a Dutch professional footballer who plays as a midfielder for Eredivisie club Feyenoord.
