= Rikke Nygard =

Norwegian footballer (born 2000)

Personal information
- Full name: Rikke Bogetveit Nygard
- Date of birth: 22 May 2000 (age 26)
- Place of birth: Norway
- Position: Midfielder

Team information
- Current team: Aalesund
- Number: 15

Youth career
- Arna-Bjørnar

Senior career*
Years	Team	Apps	(Gls)
2015–2020	Arna-Bjørnar	95	(7)
2020–2022	Vålerenga	48	(5)
2022–2025	Brann	34	(1)
2025	→ LSK Kvinner (loan)	7	(0)
2026–	Aalesund	4	(0)

International career^{‡}
2014–2015	Norway U15	7	(0)
2016	Norway U16	10	(1)
2017	Norway U17	9	(2)
2017–2019	Norway U19	19	(3)
2019–2023	Norway U23	12	(0)
2019–2020	Norway	2	(0)
- * Club domestic league appearances and goals as of 5 October 2026 ‡ National team caps and goals as of 5 October 2026

Rikke Bogetveit Nygard (born 22 May 2000) is a Norwegian footballer who plays as a midfielder for Toppserien club Aalesund.

== Personal life ==
Her older sister Mia (married Heggheim) played several years for IL Sandviken. Her brother Stian plays for Åsane.
