= Lisa Doorn =

Dutch footballer (born 2000)

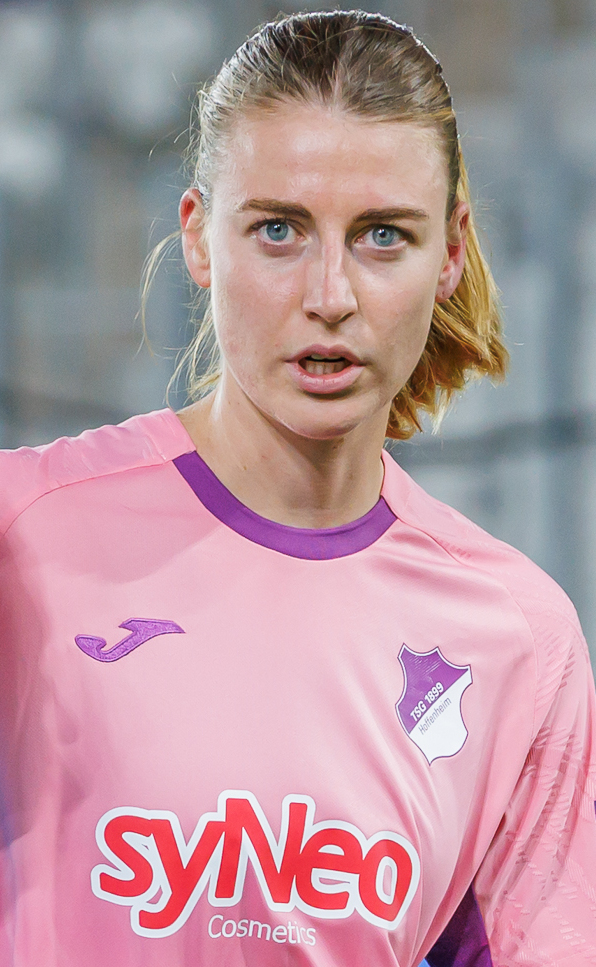
- Doorn with TSG Hoffenheim in 2025

Personal information
- Date of birth: 8 December 2000 (age 25)
- Place of birth: Amstelveen, Netherlands
- Height: 1.83 m (6 ft 0 in)
- Position: Defender

Team information
- Current team: TSG Hoffenheim
- Number: 14

Youth career
- -2015: vv ZOB
- 2015–2018: CTO Amsterdam

Senior career*
Years	Team	Apps	(Gls)
2018–2023	Ajax	71	(5)
2023–	TSG Hoffenheim	63	(0)

International career^{‡}
2015	Netherlands U15	4	(0)
2015–2016	Netherlands U16	13	(0)
2015–2017	Netherlands U17	13	(1)
2017–2019	Netherlands U19	24	(3)
2018	Netherlands U20	6	(0)
2019–2023	Netherlands U23	20	(0)
2021–	Netherlands	5	(0)
- * Club domestic league appearances and goals as of 14 November 2026 ‡ National team caps and goals as of 22 September 2025

Lisa Doorn (born 8 December 2000) is a Dutch professional footballer who plays as a defender for Frauen-Bundesliga club TSG Hoffenheim and the Netherlands national team.

== Club career ==
As a youth Doorn played for vv ZOB in her hometown Amstelveen before appearing for the centre of elitesports and education in Amsterdam. She started playing for Ajax as a seventeen year old in 2018.

In October 2020, she got a ball right on her eye, after which the ophthalmologist advised her to wear glasses for protection. Since then, Doorn played with sports glasses for a while.

== International career ==
Doorn has represented Netherlands at various youth levels. On 29 November 2021 she collected her first senior cap when she replaced Kika van Es at half-time in the game against Japan.
