= 2020 UEFA Women's Under-19 Championship qualification =

Tournament details
- Dates: Qualifying round: 1–8 October 2019; Elite round: Cancelled (7–14 April 2020)
- Teams: 46 (from 1 confederation)

Tournament statistics
- Matches played: 72
- Goals scored: 378 (5.25 per match)
- Top scorer(s): (Netherlands) Nikita Tromp (8 goals)

The 2020 UEFA Women's Under-19 Championship qualifying competition was a women's under-19 football competition that was originally to determine the seven teams joining the automatically qualified hosts Georgia in the 2020 UEFA Women's Under-19 Championship final tournament, before being cancelled due to the COVID-19 pandemic in Europe.

Apart from Georgia, 48 of the remaining 54 UEFA member national teams entered the qualifying competition. Players born on or after 1 January 2001 were eligible to participate.

== Format ==
The qualifying competition was planned to consist of two rounds:

- Qualifying round: The 48 teams were drawn into twelve groups of four teams. Each group was played in single round-robin format at one of the teams selected as hosts after the draw. The twelve group winners, the twelve runners-up, and the four third-placed teams with the best record against the first and second-placed teams in their group would have advanced to the elite round.
- Elite round (cancelled): The 28 teams were drawn into seven groups of four teams. Each group would have been played in single round-robin format at one of the teams selected as hosts after the draw. The seven group winners would have qualified for the final tournament.

The schedule of each group was planned as follows, with two rest days between each matchday (Regulations Article 20.04):

Group schedule
Matchday	Matches
Matchday 1	1 v 4, 3 v 2
Matchday 2	1 v 3, 2 v 4
Matchday 3	2 v 1, 4 v 3

=== Tiebreakers ===
In the qualifying round and planned elite round, teams were ranked according to points (3 points for a win, 1 point for a draw, 0 points for a loss), and if tied on points, the following tiebreaking criteria were applied, in the order given, to determine the rankings (Regulations Articles 14.01 and 14.02):

1. Points in head-to-head matches among tied teams;
2. Goal difference in head-to-head matches among tied teams;
3. Goals scored in head-to-head matches among tied teams;
4. If more than two teams are tied, and after applying all head-to-head criteria above, a subset of teams were still tied, all head-to-head criteria above were reapplied exclusively to this subset of teams;
5. Goal difference in all group matches;
6. Goals scored in all group matches;
7. Penalty shoot-out if only two teams had the same number of points, and they met in the last round of the group and were tied after applying all criteria above (not used if more than two teams had the same number of points, or if their rankings were not relevant for qualification for the next stage);
8. Disciplinary points (red card = 3 points, yellow card = 1 point, expulsion for two yellow cards in one match = 3 points);
9. UEFA coefficient ranking for the qualifying round draw;
10. Drawing of lots.

To determine the four best third-placed teams from the qualifying round, the results against the teams in fourth place were discarded. The following criteria were applied (Regulations Article 15.01):

1. Points;
2. Goal difference;
3. Goals scored;
4. Disciplinary points (total 3 matches);
5. UEFA coefficient ranking for the qualifying round draw;
6. Drawing of lots.

== Qualifying round ==
=== Draw ===
The draw for the qualifying round was held on 23 November 2018, 10:00 CET (UTC+1), at the UEFA headquarters in Nyon, Switzerland.

The teams were seeded according to their coefficient ranking, calculated based on the following:

- 2015 UEFA Women's Under-19 Championship final tournament and qualifying competition (qualifying round and elite round)
- 2016 UEFA Women's Under-19 Championship final tournament and qualifying competition (qualifying round and elite round)
- 2017 UEFA Women's Under-19 Championship final tournament and qualifying competition (qualifying round and elite round)
- 2018 UEFA Women's Under-19 Championship final tournament and qualifying competition (qualifying round and elite round)

Each group contained one team from Pot A, one team from Pot B, one team from Pot C, and one team from Pot D. Based on the decisions taken by the UEFA Emergency Panel, the following pairs of teams could not be drawn in the same group: Russia and Ukraine, Azerbaijan and Armenia, Serbia and Kosovo, Bosnia and Herzegovina and Kosovo.

Final tournament hosts
Team	Coeff.	Rank
Georgia	0.333	—

Teams entering qualifying round

Pot A
Team	Coeff.	Rank
Spain	33.000	1
France	27.944	2
Germany	26.500	3
Netherlands	21.722	4
Norway	19.333	5
Denmark	18.167	6
Sweden	17.944	7
Switzerland	16.278	8
Italy	15.222	9
England	15.167	10
Scotland	12.611	11
Finland	12.333	12

Pot B
Team	Coeff.	Rank
Belgium	11.667	13
Czech Republic	11.500	14
Austria	11.167	15
Russia	9.833	16
Portugal	9.667	17
Republic of Ireland	9.500	18
Serbia	9.167	19
Poland	9.000	20
Hungary	8.833	21
Iceland	8.667	22
Northern Ireland	8.000	23
Slovakia	7.833	24

Pot C
Team	Coeff.	Rank
Turkey	7.333	25
Slovenia	7.000	26
Ukraine	6.000	27
Azerbaijan	5.667	28
Israel	5.500	29
Greece	5.333	30
Romania	4.833	31
Belarus	4.667	32
Wales	4.500	33
Croatia	4.000	34
Bosnia and Herzegovina	3.667	35
Faroe Islands	3.000	36

Pot D
Team	Coeff.	Rank
Moldova	2.333	37
Montenegro	1.667	38
Albania	1.333	39
Latvia	1.000	40
Bulgaria	1.000	41
Estonia	0.333	42
North Macedonia	0.333	43
Cyprus	0.333	44
Kosovo	0.333	45
Lithuania	0.000	46
Kazakhstan	0.000	47
Armenia	0.000	48

Did not enter
Andorra	Gibraltar	Luxembourg
Liechtenstein	Malta	San Marino

=== Groups ===
The qualifying round was provisionally scheduled between 27 August and 3 September, or 1 and 8 October 2019.

Times are CEST (UTC+2), as listed by UEFA (local times, if different, are in parentheses).

==== Group 1 ====
Pos	Team	Pld	W	D	L	GF	GA	GD	Pts	Qualification
1	France	3	3	0	0	23	0	+23	9	Elite round
2	Slovakia	3	1	1	1	7	7	0	4	Elite round
3	Romania	3	1	1	1	4	8	−4	4	Elite round
4	North Macedonia (H)	3	0	0	3	0	19	−19	0	

Source: UEFA
Rules for classification: Tiebreakers
(H) Hosts
1 October 2019
11:00

Romania	1–1	Slovakia
Tatar 81' (pen.)	Report	Panáková 32'

Petar Miloševski Training Centre, Skopje
Referee: Liudmyla Telbukh (Ukraine)
1 October 2019
15:30

France	10–0	North Macedonia
Mbakem-Niaro 11'; Chapelle 13', 64', 90+1'; Hamidou 47'; Diaby 51', 69'; Eninger 62' (pen.); Zahot 71'; Ould Hocine 83'	Report

Petar Miloševski Training Centre (small stadium), Skopje
Referee: Meitar Shemesh (Israel)

4 October 2019
11:00

France	7–0	Romania
Eninger 26'; Ould Hocine 36'; Vagre 43'; Coquard 74', 90+1'; Zahot 80'; Peneau 83'	Report

Petar Miloševski Training Centre, Skopje
Referee: Lois Otte (Belgium)
4 October 2019
15:30

Slovakia	6–0	North Macedonia
Kollárová 13'; Tipulová 33'; Kaláberová 58' (pen.), 74'; Semanová 72'; Nagy 76'	Report

Petar Miloševski Training Centre (small stadium), Skopje
Referee: Liudmyla Telbukh (Ukraine)

7 October 2019
11:00

Slovakia	0–6	France
	Report	Chapelle 16'; Mbakem-Niaro 34', 75'; Zahot 42', 62'; Diaby 65'

Petar Miloševski Training Centre, Skopje
Referee: Lois Otte (Belgium)
7 October 2019
11:00

North Macedonia	0–3	Romania
	Report	Ienovan 6'; Beno 49'; Marcu 77'

Petar Miloševski Training Centre (small stadium), Skopje
Referee: Meitar Shemesh (Israel)

==== Group 2 ====
Pos	Team	Pld	W	D	L	GF	GA	GD	Pts	Qualification
1	Finland (H)	3	3	0	0	25	0	+25	9	Elite round
2	Czech Republic	3	2	0	1	10	5	+5	6	Elite round
3	Faroe Islands	3	1	0	2	1	16	−15	3	
4	Lithuania	3	0	0	3	0	15	−15	0	

Source: UEFA
Rules for classification: Tiebreakers
(H) Hosts
2 October 2019
16:00 (17:00 EEST)

Finland	9–0	Lithuania
Siren 19', 39'; Vuorinen 24', 30', 34', 37'; Topra 43'; Karjalainen 71'; Lehto 90'	Report

Hietalahti Stadium, Vaasa
Referee: Viki De Cremer (Belgium)
2 October 2019
19:15 (20:15 EEST)

Faroe Islands	0–5	Czech Republic
	Report	Novotná 23', 37', 63'; Henriksen 26' (o.g.); Lišková 79'

Hietalahti Stadium, Vaasa
Referee: Yuliya Larionova (Azerbaijan)

5 October 2019
10:00 (11:00 EEST)

Czech Republic	5–0	Lithuania
Šubrtová 6', 45+5' (pen.), 66'; Cvrčková 38'; Novotná 90+2'	Report

Hietalahti Stadium, Vaasa
Referee: Yuliya Larionova (Azerbaijan)
5 October 2019
17:30 (18:30 EEST)

Finland	11–0	Faroe Islands
Huhta 14', 27', 57'; Koivisto 19', 87' (pen.); Kantanen 50', 61'; Siren 52'; Karjalainen 63', 78'; Lehto 65'	Report

Hietalahti Stadium, Vaasa
Referee: Volha Tsiareshka (Belarus)

8 October 2019
12:00 (13:00 EEST)

Czech Republic	0–5	Finland
	Report	Kantanen 30'; Yang 35', 56'; Lehto 63'; Huhta 77'

Hietalahti Stadium, Vaasa
Referee: Volha Tsiareshka (Belarus)
8 October 2019
12:00 (13:00 EEST)

Lithuania	0–1	Faroe Islands
	Report	Tórolvsdóttir 90'

OmaSP Stadion, Seinäjoki
Referee: Viki De Cremer (Belgium)

==== Group 3 ====
Pos	Team	Pld	W	D	L	GF	GA	GD	Pts	Qualification
1	Germany	3	3	0	0	18	1	+17	9	Elite round
2	Portugal (H)	3	2	0	1	16	4	+12	6	Elite round
3	Azerbaijan	3	1	0	2	1	12	−11	3	
4	Albania	3	0	0	3	0	18	−18	0	

Source: UEFA
Rules for classification: Tiebreakers
(H) Hosts
2 October 2019
15:00 (14:00 WEST)

Azerbaijan	0–6	Portugal
	Report	Encarnação 13', 31', 35', 64'; Pintassilgo 20'; Teles 65'

Complexo Desportivo Clube de Futebol de Fão, Fão
Referee: Tanja Racic (Bosnia and Herzegovina)
2 October 2019
17:00 (16:00 WEST)

Germany	8–0	Albania
Corley 6'; Fuso 10', 39'; Fudalla 23', 68', 84'; Wimmer 25'; Weidauer 70'	Report

Estádio Municipal de Fafe, Fafe
Referee: Ioanna Allayiotou (Cyprus)

5 October 2019
15:00 (14:00 WEST)

Germany	6–0	Azerbaijan
Weidauer 15', 20'; Berning 46'; Fudalla 59'; Köster 65'; Corley 77'	Report

Cidade Desportiva Sporting Clube de Braga, Braga
Referee: Sabina Bolić (Croatia)
5 October 2019
17:00 (16:00 WEST)

Portugal	9–0	Albania
Nazareth 1', 45+4'; Ferreira 8', 21'; Pintassilgo 33', 44'; Barbosa 60'; Albuquerque 75' (pen.); Teles 84'	Report

Estádio Municipal de Fafe, Fafe
Referee: Tanja Racic (Bosnia and Herzegovina)

8 October 2019
12:00 (11:00 WEST)

Portugal	1–4	Germany
Jacinto 62'	Report	Fuso 12'; Weidauer 18'; Fudalla 41', 60' (pen.)

Cidade Desportiva Sporting Clube de Braga, Braga
Referee: Sabina Bolić (Croatia)
8 October 2019
12:00 (11:00 WEST)

Albania	0–1	Azerbaijan
	Report	Deli 72'

Complexo Desportivo Clube de Futebol de Fão, Fão
Referee: Ioanna Allayiotou (Cyprus)

==== Group 4 ====
Pos	Team	Pld	W	D	L	GF	GA	GD	Pts	Qualification
1	Scotland	3	2	1	0	5	0	+5	7	Elite round
2	Poland (H)	3	2	0	1	7	1	+6	6	Elite round
3	Croatia	3	0	2	1	0	2	−2	2	Elite round
4	Bulgaria	3	0	1	2	0	9	−9	1	

Source: UEFA
Rules for classification: Tiebreakers
(H) Hosts
2 October 2019
17:00

Scotland	4–0	Bulgaria
Moore 26'; McGowan 49'; Scott 66'; Maughan 76'	Report

Stadion GKS, Bełchatów
Referee: Ifeoma Kulmala (Finland)
2 October 2019
17:00

Croatia	0–2	Poland
	Report	Šabašov 72' (o.g.); Tomasiak 90+5' (pen.)

2. Stadion MOSiR Sieradz, Sieradz
Referee: Chryso Georgiou (Cyprus)

5 October 2019
16:00

Scotland	0–0	Croatia
	Report

2. Stadion MOSiR Sieradz, Sieradz
Referee: Frida Nielsen (Denmark)
5 October 2019
16:00

Poland	5–0	Bulgaria
Tomasiak 13'; Padilla 15', 68'; Brzęczek 55'; Kozak 78'	Report

Stadion GKS, Bełchatów
Referee: Chryso Georgiou (Cyprus)

8 October 2019
15:00

Poland	0–1	Scotland
	Report	Smith 9'

Stadion Widzewa, Łódź
Referee: Frida Nielsen (Denmark)
8 October 2019
15:00

Bulgaria	0–0	Croatia
	Report

1. Stadion Miejski al. Unii Lubelskiej 2, Łódź
Referee: Ifeoma Kulmala (Finland)

==== Group 5 ====
Pos	Team	Pld	W	D	L	GF	GA	GD	Pts	Qualification
1	Norway	3	3	0	0	26	0	+26	9	Elite round
2	Northern Ireland (H)	3	2	0	1	7	7	0	6	Elite round
3	Wales	3	1	0	2	3	12	−9	3	
4	Moldova	3	0	0	3	0	17	−17	0	

Source: UEFA
Rules for classification: Tiebreakers
(H) Hosts
2 October 2019
15:00 (14:00 BST)

Norway	8–0	Moldova
Ildhusøy 3', 61'; Harviken 45'; Revees 65'; Hegg 74', 83'; Mellemstrand 85'; Terland 86'	Report

Stangmore Park, Dungannon
Referee: Victoria Beyer (France)
2 October 2019
20:30 (19:30 BST)

Wales	0–1	Northern Ireland
	Report	Rea 73'

Shamrock Park, Portadown
Referee: Jelena Pejković (Croatia)

5 October 2019
15:00 (14:00 BST)

Norway	11–0	Wales
Østenstad 27'; Ildhusøy 43', 69', 90+4' (pen.); Terland 53'; Hegg 55', 82'; Gashi 57', 74'; Revees 83'; Joramo 85'	Report

Shamrock Park, Portadown
Referee: Maria Marotta (Italy)
5 October 2019
20:30 (19:30 BST)

Northern Ireland	6–0	Moldova
Collighan 24'; McGuinness 29'; Smyth 58'; McKenna 70'; Burrows 78'; Finnegan 90+4'	Report

Ballymena Showgrounds, Ballymena
Referee: Jelena Pejković (Croatia)

8 October 2019
15:00 (14:00 BST)

Northern Ireland	0–7	Norway
	Report	Gashi 6'; Harviken 22'; Lillegård 48'; Terland 52'; Ildhusøy 59'; Blakstad 74', 89' (pen.)

Seaview, Belfast
Referee: Maria Marotta (Italy)
8 October 2019
15:00 (14:00 BST)

Moldova	0–3	Wales
	Report	Rogers 52', 54'; Griffiths 90+4'

Solitude, Belfast
Referee: Victoria Beyer (France)

==== Group 6 ====
Pos	Team	Pld	W	D	L	GF	GA	GD	Pts	Qualification
1	Switzerland	3	3	0	0	9	0	+9	9	Elite round
2	Austria (H)	3	2	0	1	8	1	+7	6	Elite round
3	Israel	3	1	0	2	5	4	+1	3	Elite round
4	Latvia	3	0	0	3	1	18	−17	0	

Source: UEFA
Rules for classification: Tiebreakers
(H) Hosts
1 October 2019
11:00

Switzerland	7–0	Latvia
Fölmli 19', 42'; Xhemaili 26', 28', 29'; Kadriu 52'; Bohner 70'	Report

DANA Arena, Windischgarsten
Attendance: 25
Referee: Jurgita Mačikunytė (Lithuania)
1 October 2019
16:00

Israel	0–2	Austria
	Report	Wienerroither 32', 86'

HF-Stadion, Bad Wimsbach-Neydharting
Attendance: 200
Referee: Karoline Wacker (Germany)

4 October 2019
11:00

Switzerland	1–0	Israel
Fölmli 67'	Report

HF-Stadion, Bad Wimsbach-Neydharting
Attendance: 40
Referee: María Dolores Martinez Madrona (Spain)
4 October 2019
16:00

Austria	6–0	Latvia
Hillebrand 14'; Degen 25'; Wienerroither 47'; Mittermair 59'; Plattner 79'; Brunold 84'	Report

DANA Arena, Windischgarsten
Attendance: 300
Referee: Karoline Wacker (Germany)

7 October 2019
16:00

Austria	0–1	Switzerland
	Report	Iseni 29'

HF-Stadion, Bad Wimsbach-Neydharting
Attendance: 200
Referee: María Dolores Martinez Madrona (Spain)
7 October 2019
16:00

Latvia	1–5	Israel
Krasnova 88'	Report	Selimhodžić 2'; Faingezicht 50' (pen.), 60'; Kuznezov 61'; Polishuk 72'

DANA Arena, Windischgarsten
Attendance: 40
Referee: Jurgita Mačikunytė (Lithuania)

==== Group 7 ====
Pos	Team	Pld	W	D	L	GF	GA	GD	Pts	Qualification
1	Spain	3	3	0	0	22	0	+22	9	Elite round
2	Iceland (H)	3	2	0	1	13	3	+10	6	Elite round
3	Greece	3	1	0	2	8	11	−3	3	
4	Kazakhstan	3	0	0	3	0	29	−29	0	

Source: UEFA
Rules for classification: Tiebreakers
(H) Hosts
2 October 2019
19:00 (17:00 WET)

Spain	14–0	Kazakhstan
Navarro 20', 25', 68' (pen.); Martínez 24'; Salvador 31', 34', 52'; Nevado 45+3' (pen.); Fernández 47'; Marín 63'; López 70' (pen.), 78'; Ruiz 79', 84'	Report

Hlíðarendi, Reykjavík
Referee: Marina Aufschnaiter (Austria)
2 October 2019
19:00 (17:00 WET)

Greece	0–6	Iceland
	Report	Hálfdánardóttir 2'; Vilhjálmsdóttir 9' (pen.); Ásþórsdóttir 32'; Jónsdóttir 53', 75'; Boama 90+2'

Víkingsvöllur, Reykjavík
Referee: Lizzy Van Der Helm (Netherlands)

5 October 2019
16:00 (14:00 WET)

Spain	5–0	Greece
Martínez 34'; Hernández 45+1'; Ruiz 56'; Marín 59' (pen.), 82'	Report

Víkingsvöllur, Reykjavík
Referee: Lucie Šulcová (Czech Republic)
5 October 2019
16:00 (14:00 WET)

Iceland	7–0	Kazakhstan
Georgsdóttir 5'; Hermannsdóttir 9', 69'; Ásþórsdóttir 54'; Sigurgeirsdóttir 60'; Jónsdóttir 61'; Þórðardóttir 74'	Report

Fylkisvöllur, Reykjavík
Referee: Lizzy Van Der Helm (Netherlands)

8 October 2019
19:00 (17:00 WET)

Iceland	0–3	Spain
	Report	Martínez 43'; Peña 64'; Navarro 90+6'

Hlíðarendi, Reykjavík
Referee: Lucie Šulcová (Czech Republic)
8 October 2019
19:00 (17:00 WET)

Kazakhstan	0–8	Greece
	Report	Prifti 15'; Mikrouli 25' (pen.), 62'; Voila 29', 55'; Pachaki 60'; Saich 69'; Gatoudi 85'

Fylkisvöllur, Reykjavík
Referee: Marina Aufschnaiter (Austria)

==== Group 8 ====
Pos	Team	Pld	W	D	L	GF	GA	GD	Pts	Qualification
1	Russia	3	3	0	0	12	0	+12	9	Elite round
2	Italy (H)	3	2	0	1	8	2	+6	6	Elite round
3	Slovenia	3	1	0	2	6	8	−2	3	
4	Estonia	3	0	0	3	0	16	−16	0	

Source: UEFA
Rules for classification: Tiebreakers
(H) Hosts
2 October 2019
11:00

Slovenia	0–5	Russia
	Report	Govor 24'; Abdullina 42', 69'; Kozik 75'; Brusova 90+2'

Stadio Comunale Santi Tiezzi, Cortona
Referee: Emilie Dokset (Norway)
2 October 2019
15:00

Italy	5–0	Estonia
Bragonzi 1', 50'; Anghileri 4'; Boglioni 54'; Landa 62'	Report

Stadio Artemio Franchi – Montepaschi Arena, Siena
Referee: Neslihan Muratdağı (Turkey)

5 October 2019
12:00

Russia	6–0	Estonia
Petrova 24'; Abdullina 42' (pen.); Trenkina 50'; Kozik 59'; Lazareva 61', 84'	Report

Stadio Comunale Santi Tiezzi, Cortona
Referee: Emilie Dokset (Norway)
5 October 2019
15:00

Italy	3–1	Slovenia
Silvioni 29' (pen.); Anghileri 76'; Landa 78'	Report	Milovič 65'

Stadio Artemio Franchi – Montepaschi Arena, Siena
Referee: Shona Shukrula (Netherlands)

8 October 2019
15:00

Russia	1–0	Italy
Lazareva 18'	Report

Stadio Artemio Franchi – Montepaschi Arena, Siena
Referee: Shona Shukrula (Netherlands)
8 October 2019
15:00

Estonia	0–5	Slovenia
	Report	Milovič 43'; Potočnik 56'; Kastelec 65', 90', 90+5'

Stadio Comunale Santi Tiezzi, Cortona
Referee: Neslihan Muratdağı (Turkey)

==== Group 9 ====
Pos	Team	Pld	W	D	L	GF	GA	GD	Pts	Qualification
1	Netherlands (H)	3	3	0	0	19	1	+18	9	Elite round
2	Republic of Ireland	3	2	0	1	5	6	−1	6	Elite round
3	Ukraine	3	1	0	2	4	8	−4	3	
4	Montenegro	3	0	0	3	2	15	−13	0	

Source: UEFA
Rules for classification: Tiebreakers
(H) Hosts
2 October 2019
15:00

Ukraine	0–2	Republic of Ireland
	Report	Ziu 34'; Slattery 61'

Sportpark Zegersloot, Alphen aan den Rijn
Referee: Sandra Strub (Switzerland)
2 October 2019
19:00

Netherlands	9–0	Montenegro
Tromp 16', 17', 57', 59', 82', 88'; Van de Westeringh 42'; Van de Velde 67'; Hendriks 86'	Report

Sportpark Juliana, 's-Gravenzande
Referee: Jelena Cvetković (Serbia)

5 October 2019
13:00

Republic of Ireland	3–0	Montenegro
McEvoy 7', 16' (pen.); Miladinović 19' (o.g.)	Report

Sportpark Juliana, 's-Gravenzande
Referee: Sandra Strub (Switzerland)
5 October 2019
17:00

Netherlands	4–1	Ukraine
Grant 33'; Loonen 35'; Hilhorst 88'; Peddemors 90+4'	Report	Veherych 51'

Sportpark Zegersloot, Alphen aan den Rijn
Referee: Vesna Budimir (Croatia)

8 October 2019
19:00

Republic of Ireland	0–6	Netherlands
	Report	Van Koot 10'; Tromp 28', 57'; Grant 51'; Foederer 55'; Peddemors 84'

Sportpark Juliana, 's-Gravenzande
Referee: Vesna Budimir (Croatia)
8 October 2019
19:00

Montenegro	2–3	Ukraine
Nađa 13'; Knežević 71' (pen.)	Report	Nemets 22'; Kotiash 38'; Bilokur 58'

Sportpark Zegersloot, Alphen aan den Rijn
Referee: Jelena Cvetković (Serbia)

==== Group 10 ====
Pos	Team	Pld	W	D	L	GF	GA	GD	Pts	Qualification
1	Belgium	3	3	0	0	21	1	+20	9	Elite round
2	Sweden	3	1	1	1	16	3	+13	4	Elite round
3	Bosnia and Herzegovina (H)	3	1	1	1	6	5	+1	4	Elite round
4	Armenia	3	0	0	3	0	34	−34	0	

Source: UEFA
Rules for classification: Tiebreakers
(H) Hosts
2 October 2019
11:00

Sweden	14–0	Armenia
Olsson 2', 14', 30', 35', 37'; Ijeh 6', 45'; Lundkvist 8', 11'; Lang 25'; Lilja Vidlund 59', 90'; Bennison 67'; Andersson 89'	Report

Stadion Etno Selo Stanišići, Bijeljina
Referee: Marina Višnjić (Serbia)
2 October 2019
15:30

Bosnia and Herzegovina	1–3	Belgium
Krajšumović 29'	Report	Kees 45+1'; Knapen 55', 68'

Stadion Etno Selo Stanišići, Bijeljina
Referee: Cristina Trandafir (Romania)

5 October 2019
11:00

Belgium	17–0	Armenia
Petry 2', 10'; Geers 5', 90+1'; Galstyan 12', 20' (o.g.); Meersman 14'; De Groote 35', 40'; Knapen 43'; Mertens 51'; Corbeels 68'; Buabadi 71', 85', 90+2'; Brackman 72'; Kees 90' (pen.)	Report

Stadion Etno Selo Stanišići, Bijeljina
Referee: Cristina Trandafir (Romania)
5 October 2019
15:30

Sweden	2–2	Bosnia and Herzegovina
Olsson 58'; Lang 61'	Report	Krajnić 5'; Husić 15' (pen.)

Stadion Etno Selo Stanišići, Bijeljina
Referee: Angelika Soeder (Germany)

8 October 2019
15:00

Belgium	1–0	Sweden
De Groote 45+1'	Report

Novi Gradski Stadion, Ugljevik
Referee: Angelika Soeder (Germany)
8 October 2019
15:00

Armenia	0–3	Bosnia and Herzegovina
	Report	Hasić 36'; Zukić 62'; Husić 84'

Stadion Etno Selo Stanišići, Bijeljina
Referee: Marina Višnjić (Serbia)

==== Group 11 ====
Pos	Team	Pld	W	D	L	GF	GA	GD	Pts	Qualification
1	England	3	3	0	0	17	0	+17	9	Elite round
2	Serbia	3	2	0	1	9	7	+2	6	Elite round
3	Belarus (H)	3	1	0	2	7	7	0	3	
4	Cyprus	3	0	0	3	0	19	−19	0	

Source: UEFA
Rules for classification: Tiebreakers
(H) Hosts
2 October 2019
11:00 (12:00 FET)

England	8–0	Cyprus
Blanchard 2'; Park 12' (pen.), 25', 62'; Manders 31'; Bradley 78'; Salmon 90'; Roberts 90+2'	Report

Spartak Stadium, Mogilev
Referee: Kateryna Usova (Ukraine)
2 October 2019
17:00 (18:00 FET)

Belarus	1–4	Serbia
Valyuk 84'	Report	Stupar 29'; Plavšić 37', 69'; Petrović 72' (pen.)

Spartak Stadium, Mogilev
Referee: Michèle Schmölzer (Switzerland)

5 October 2019
11:00 (12:00 FET)

Serbia	5–0	Cyprus
Petrović 9', 17' (pen.); Denda 38', 71'; Krstić 54'	Report

Spartak Stadium, Mogilev
Referee: Michèle Schmölzer (Switzerland)
5 October 2019
17:00 (18:00 FET)

England	3–0	Belarus
Salmon 62', 64'; Park 90'	Report

Spartak Stadium, Mogilev
Referee: Zulema Gonzalez Gonzalez (Spain)

8 October 2019
13:00 (14:00 FET)

Serbia	0–6	England
	Report	Manders 19'; Park 57', 81', 87'; Salmon 69'; Blanchard 84'

City Stadium, Orsha
Referee: Zulema Gonzalez Gonzalez (Spain)
8 October 2019
13:00 (14:00 FET)

Cyprus	0–6	Belarus
	Report	Sidorchuk 13', 90'; Tatarin 31'; Tikhan 53', 59'; Tikhvodova 67'

Spartak Stadium, Mogilev
Referee: Kateryna Usova (Ukraine)

==== Group 12 ====
Pos	Team	Pld	W	D	L	GF	GA	GD	Pts	Qualification
1	Denmark	3	2	1	0	14	0	+14	7	Elite round
2	Hungary	3	2	1	0	8	1	+7	7	Elite round
3	Turkey (H)	3	0	1	2	2	10	−8	1	
4	Kosovo	3	0	1	2	3	16	−13	1	

Source: UEFA
Rules for classification: Tiebreakers
(H) Hosts
2 October 2019
12:30 (13:30 TRT)

Denmark	8–0	Kosovo
Lundgaard 15', 21', 45+4', 55'; Bredgaard 29'; Møller Holdt 56'; Sundahl 62'; E. Rasmussen 80'	Report

Arslan Zeki Demirci Sports Complex 2, Manavgat
Referee: Irena Velevačkoska (North Macedonia)
2 October 2019
15:00 (16:00 TRT)

Turkey	0–2	Hungary
	Report	Pusztai 26', 45'

Arslan Zeki Demirci Sports Complex 1, Manavgat
Referee: Anastasiya Romanyuk (Ukraine)

5 October 2019
12:30 (13:30 TRT)

Hungary	6–1	Kosovo
Pusztai 21', 82'; Bódai 24', 49', 80'; Stefán 88'	Report	Emërllahu 19'

Arslan Zeki Demirci Sports Complex 2, Manavgat
Referee: Anastasiya Romanyuk (Ukraine)
5 October 2019
15:00 (16:00 TRT)

Denmark	6–0	Turkey
Møller Holdt 15'; Lundgaard 23'; Kartal 37' (o.g.); Hasbo 45+1'; M. Rasmussen 61'; Kramer 70'	Report

Arslan Zeki Demirci Sports Complex 1, Manavgat
Referee: Graziella Pirriatore (Italy)

8 October 2019
15:00 (16:00 TRT)

Hungary	0–0	Denmark
	Report

Arslan Zeki Demirci Sports Complex 2, Manavgat
Referee: Graziella Pirriatore (Italy)
8 October 2019
15:00 (16:00 TRT)

Kosovo	2–2	Turkey
Fejza 36'; Rexhepi 67'	Report	Dülek 3'; Gürel 90'

Arslan Zeki Demirci Sports Complex 1, Manavgat
Referee: Irena Velevačkoska (Macedonia)

=== Ranking of third-placed teams ===
To determine the four best third-placed teams from the qualifying round which advance to the elite round, only the results of the third-placed teams against the first and second-placed teams in their group are taken into account.

Pos	Grp	Team	Pld	W	D	L	GF	GA	GD	Pts	Qualification
1	10	Bosnia and Herzegovina	2	0	1	1	3	5	−2	1	Elite round
2	4	Croatia	2	0	1	1	0	2	−2	1	Elite round
3	1	Romania	2	0	1	1	1	8	−7	1	Elite round
4	6	Israel	2	0	0	2	0	3	−3	0	Elite round
5	9	Ukraine	2	0	0	2	1	6	−5	0	
6	11	Belarus	2	0	0	2	1	7	−6	0	
7	8	Slovenia	2	0	0	2	1	8	−7	0	
8	12	Turkey	2	0	0	2	0	8	−8	0	
9	7	Greece	2	0	0	2	0	11	−11	0	
10	5	Wales	2	0	0	2	0	12	−12	0 (Note: Ranked on disciplinary points: Wales –3, Azerbaijan –10.)	
11	3	Azerbaijan	2	0	0	2	0	12	−12	0	
12	2	Faroe Islands	2	0	0	2	0	16	−16	0	

Source: UEFA
Rules for classification: 1) points; 2) goal difference; 3) goals scored; 4) disciplinary points; 5) coefficient ranking; 6) drawing of lots.

== Elite round (cancelled) ==
=== Draw ===
The draw for the elite round was held on 29 November 2019, 11:00 CET (UTC+1), at the UEFA headquarters in Nyon, Switzerland.

The teams were seeded according to their results in the qualifying round. Each group contained one team from Pot A, one team from Pot B, one team from Pot C, and one team from Pot D. Winners and runners-up from the same qualifying round group could not be drawn in the same group, but the best third-placed teams could be drawn in the same group as winners or runners-up from the same qualifying round group.

Pos	Grp	Team	Pld	W	D	L	GF	GA	GD	Pts	Seeding
1	5	Norway	3	3	0	0	26	0	+26	9	Pot A
2	2	Finland	3	3	0	0	25	0	+25	9	Pot A
3	1	France	3	3	0	0	23	0	+23	9	Pot A
4	7	Spain	3	3	0	0	22	0	+22	9	Pot A
5	10	Belgium	3	3	0	0	21	1	+20	9	Pot A
6	9	Netherlands	3	3	0	0	19	1	+18	9	Pot A
7	3	Germany	3	3	0	0	18	1	+17	9	Pot A
8	11	England	3	3	0	0	17	0	+17	9	Pot B
9	8	Russia	3	3	0	0	12	0	+12	9	Pot B
10	6	Switzerland	3	3	0	0	9	0	+9	9	Pot B
11	12	Denmark	3	2	1	0	14	0	+14	7	Pot B
12	12	Hungary	3	2	1	0	8	1	+7	7	Pot B
13	4	Scotland	3	2	1	0	5	0	+5	7	Pot B
14	3	Portugal	3	2	0	1	16	4	+12	6	Pot B
15	7	Iceland	3	2	0	1	13	3	+10	6	Pot C
16	6	Austria	3	2	0	1	8	1	+7	6	Pot C
17	8	Italy	3	2	0	1	8	2	+6	6	Pot C
18	4	Poland	3	2	0	1	7	1	+6	6	Pot C
19	2	Czech Republic	3	2	0	1	10	5	+5	6	Pot C
20	11	Serbia	3	2	0	1	9	7	+2	6	Pot C
21	5	Northern Ireland	3	2	0	1	7	7	0	6	Pot C
22	9	Republic of Ireland	3	2	0	1	5	6	−1	6	Pot D
23	10	Sweden	3	1	1	1	16	3	+13	4	Pot D
24	10	Bosnia and Herzegovina (Y)	3	1	1	1	6	5	+1	4	Pot D
25	1	Slovakia	3	1	1	1	7	7	0	4	Pot D
26	1	Romania (Y)	3	1	1	1	4	8	−4	4	Pot D
27	6	Israel (Y)	3	1	0	2	5	4	+1	3	Pot D
28	4	Croatia (Y)	3	0	2	1	0	2	−2	2	Pot D

Source: UEFA
Rules for classification: 1) points; 2) goal difference; 3) goals scored; 4) disciplinary points; 5) coefficient ranking; 6) drawing of lots.
(Y) Third-placed teams from qualifying round (may be drawn with teams from same qualifying round group)

=== Groups ===
The elite round was originally scheduled to be played between 7–14 April 2020. On 12 March 2020, UEFA announced that the elite round had been postponed due to the COVID-19 pandemic in Europe. UEFA announced on 1 April 2020 that the tournament had been cancelled.

Times are CEST (UTC+2), as listed by UEFA (local times, if different, are in parentheses).

==== Group 1 ====
Pos	Team	Pld	W	D	L	GF	GA	GD	Pts	Qualification
1	Netherlands (H)	0	0	0	0	0	0	0	0	Final tournament
2	Scotland	0	0	0	0	0	0	0	0	
3	Iceland	0	0	0	0	0	0	0	0	
4	Romania	0	0	0	0	0	0	0	0	

First match(es) will be played: 8 April 2020. Source: UEFA
Rules for classification: Tiebreakers
(H) Hosts
8 April 2020
15:00

Iceland	Cancelled	Scotland
	Report

Sportpark Het Midden, Vriezenveen
8 April 2020
18:30

Netherlands	Cancelled	Romania
	Report

Sportpark Vondersweijde, Oldenzaal

11 April 2020
12:00

Scotland	Cancelled	Romania
	Report

Sportpark Vondersweijde, Oldenzaal
11 April 2020
16:00

Netherlands	Cancelled	Iceland
	Report

Sportpark Het Midden, Vriezenveen

14 April 2020
18:30

Scotland	Cancelled	Netherlands
	Report

Sportpark Vondersweijde, Oldenzaal
14 April 2020
18:30

Romania	Cancelled	Iceland
	Report

Sportpark Het Midden, Vriezenveen

==== Group 2 ====
Pos	Team	Pld	W	D	L	GF	GA	GD	Pts	Qualification
1	Germany	0	0	0	0	0	0	0	0	Final tournament
2	Denmark	0	0	0	0	0	0	0	0	
3	Northern Ireland (H)	0	0	0	0	0	0	0	0	
4	Israel	0	0	0	0	0	0	0	0	

First match(es) will be played: 7 April 2020. Source: UEFA
Rules for classification: Tiebreakers
(H) Hosts
7 April 2020
14:00 (13:00 BST)

Germany	Cancelled	Israel
	Report

Seaview, Belfast
7 April 2020
20:30 (19:30 BST)

Northern Ireland	Cancelled	Denmark
	Report

Seaview, Belfast

10 April 2020
14:00 (13:00 BST)

Denmark	Cancelled	Israel
	Report

Seaview, Belfast
10 April 2020
20:30 (19:30 BST)

Germany	Cancelled	Northern Ireland
	Report

Seaview, Belfast

13 April 2020
14:00 (13:00 BST)

Denmark	Cancelled	Germany
	Report

Solitude, Belfast
13 April 2020
14:00 (13:00 BST)

Israel	Cancelled	Northern Ireland
	Report

Seaview, Belfast

==== Group 3 ====
Pos	Team	Pld	W	D	L	GF	GA	GD	Pts	Qualification
1	Spain	0	0	0	0	0	0	0	0	Final tournament
2	Switzerland	0	0	0	0	0	0	0	0	
3	Serbia	0	0	0	0	0	0	0	0	
4	Sweden (H)	0	0	0	0	0	0	0	0	

First match(es) will be played: 8 April 2020. Source: UEFA
Rules for classification: Tiebreakers
(H) Hosts
8 April 2020
13:30

Serbia	Cancelled	Switzerland
	Report

Bravida Arena, Gothenburg
8 April 2020
18:00

Spain	Cancelled	Sweden
	Report

Bravida Arena, Gothenburg

11 April 2020
13:30

Switzerland	Cancelled	Sweden
	Report

Bravida Arena, Gothenburg
11 April 2020
18:00

Spain	Cancelled	Serbia
	Report

Bravida Arena, Gothenburg

14 April 2020
13:30

Switzerland	Cancelled	Spain
	Report

Valhalla IP, Gothenburg
14 April 2020
13:30

Sweden	Cancelled	Serbia
	Report

Bravida Arena, Gothenburg

==== Group 4 ====
Pos	Team	Pld	W	D	L	GF	GA	GD	Pts	Qualification
1	Finland	0	0	0	0	0	0	0	0	Final tournament
2	Russia	0	0	0	0	0	0	0	0	
3	Austria	0	0	0	0	0	0	0	0	
4	Croatia (H)	0	0	0	0	0	0	0	0	

First match(es) will be played: 8 April 2020. Source: UEFA
Rules for classification: Tiebreakers
(H) Hosts
8 April 2020

Finland	Cancelled	Croatia
	Report

8 April 2020

Austria	Cancelled	Russia
	Report

11 April 2020

Finland	Cancelled	Austria
	Report

11 April 2020

Russia	Cancelled	Croatia
	Report

14 April 2020

Russia	Cancelled	Finland
	Report

14 April 2020

Croatia	Cancelled	Austria
	Report

==== Group 5 ====
Pos	Team	Pld	W	D	L	GF	GA	GD	Pts	Qualification
1	France	0	0	0	0	0	0	0	0	Final tournament
2	Portugal (H)	0	0	0	0	0	0	0	0	
3	Italy	0	0	0	0	0	0	0	0	
4	Bosnia and Herzegovina	0	0	0	0	0	0	0	0	

First match(es) will be played: 7 April 2020. Source: UEFA
Rules for classification: Tiebreakers
(H) Hosts
7 April 2020
12:45 (11:45 WEST)

France	Cancelled	Bosnia and Herzegovina
	Report

Estádio Municipal de Nelas, Nelas
7 April 2020
17:00 (16:00 WEST)

Italy	Cancelled	Portugal
	Report

Estádio Municipal do Fontelo, Viseu

10 April 2020
12:45 (11:45 WEST)

France	Cancelled	Italy
	Report

Estádio Municipal de Mangualde, Mangualde
10 April 2020
17:00 (16:00 WEST)

Portugal	Cancelled	Bosnia and Herzegovina
	Report

Parque Desportivo de Sant'Ana, Penalva do Castelo

13 April 2020
16:00 (15:00 WEST)

Portugal	Cancelled	France
	Report

Estádio Municipal do Fontelo, Viseu
13 April 2020
16:00 (15:00 WEST)

Bosnia and Herzegovina	Cancelled	Italy
	Report

Estádio Municipal de Mangualde, Mangualde

==== Group 6 ====
Pos	Team	Pld	W	D	L	GF	GA	GD	Pts	Qualification
1	Belgium	0	0	0	0	0	0	0	0	Final tournament
2	Hungary	0	0	0	0	0	0	0	0	
3	Poland (H)	0	0	0	0	0	0	0	0	
4	Slovakia	0	0	0	0	0	0	0	0	

First match(es) will be played: 8 April 2020. Source: UEFA
Rules for classification: Tiebreakers
(H) Hosts
8 April 2020
16:00

Belgium	Cancelled	Slovakia
	Report

MOSiR Brzeg, Brzeg
8 April 2020
18:00

Poland	Cancelled	Hungary
	Report

Stadion Miejski, Kluczbork

11 April 2020
15:00

Belgium	Cancelled	Poland
	Report

MOSiR Brzeg, Brzeg
11 April 2020
15:00

Hungary	Cancelled	Slovakia
	Report

Stadion Miejski, Kluczbork

14 April 2020
15:00

Hungary	Cancelled	Belgium
	Report

Stadion Miejski, Kluczbork
14 April 2020
15:00

Slovakia	Cancelled	Poland
	Report

MOSiR Brzeg, Brzeg

==== Group 7 ====
Pos	Team	Pld	W	D	L	GF	GA	GD	Pts	Qualification
1	Norway	0	0	0	0	0	0	0	0	Final tournament
2	England	0	0	0	0	0	0	0	0	
3	Czech Republic (H)	0	0	0	0	0	0	0	0	
4	Republic of Ireland	0	0	0	0	0	0	0	0	

First match(es) will be played: 8 April 2020. Source: UEFA
Rules for classification: Tiebreakers
(H) Hosts
8 April 2020
15:00

Norway	Cancelled	Republic of Ireland
	Report

Stadion TJ Přeštice, Přeštice
8 April 2020
18:30

Czech Republic	Cancelled	England
	Report

Na Litavce, Příbram

11 April 2020
15:00

Norway	Cancelled	Czech Republic
	Report

Městský stadion Střelnice, Domažlice
11 April 2020
15:00

England	Cancelled	Republic of Ireland
	Report

Stadion TJ Přeštice, Přeštice

14 April 2020
15:00

England	Cancelled	Norway
	Report

Městský stadion Střelnice, Domažlice
14 April 2020
15:00

Republic of Ireland	Cancelled	Czech Republic
	Report

Stadion TJ Přeštice, Přeštice

== Goalscorers ==
In the qualifying round, there were 378 goals scored in 72 matches, for an average of 5.25 goals per match.

8 goals

- (Netherlands) Nikita Tromp

7 goals

- (England) Jess Park

6 goals

- (Germany) Vanessa Fudalla
- (Norway) Celin Bizet Ildhusøy
- (Sweden) Beata Olsson

5 goals

- (Denmark) Sofie Lundgaard

4 goals

- (Czech Republic) Simona Novotná
- (England) Ebony Salmon
- (Finland) Annika Huhta
- (Finland) Aino Vuorinen
- (France) Kenza Chapelle
- (France) Sarah Zahot
- (Germany) Sophie Weidauer
- (Hungary) Sára Pusztai
- (Norway) Eline Hegg
- (Portugal) Telma Encarnação
- (Spain) Eva Navarro

3 goals

- (Austria) Katja Wienerroither
- (Belgium) Esther Buabadi
- (Belgium) Talitha De Groote
- (Belgium) Karlijn Knapen
- (Czech Republic) Anna Šubrtová
- (Finland) Jenni Kantanen
- (Finland) Ria Karjalainen
- (Finland) Nora Lehto
- (Finland) Oona Siren
- (France) Dialamba Diaby
- (France) Esther Mbakem-Niaro
- (Germany) Ivana Fuso
- (Hungary) Viktória Bódai
- (Iceland) Sveindís Jane Jónsdóttir
- (Norway) Laura Gashi
- (Norway) Elisabeth Terland
- (Portugal) Lara Pintassilgo
- (Russia) Alsu Abdullina
- (Russia) Elizaveta Lazareva
- (Serbia) Emilija Ema Petrović
- (Slovenia) Mirjam Kastelec
- (Spain) Ainhoa Marín
- (Spain) Ascensión Martínez
- (Spain) María Ruiz
- (Spain) Aixa Salvador
- (Switzerland) Svenja Fölmli
- (Switzerland) Riola Xhemaili

2 goals

- (Belarus) Anastasiya Sidorchuk
- (Belarus) Viktoriya Tikhan
- (Belgium) Janne Geers
- (Belgium) Sari Kees
- (Belgium) Lisa Petry
- (Bosnia and Herzegovina) Elma Husić
- (Denmark) Olivia Møller Holdt
- (England) Annabel Blanchard
- (England) Holly Manders
- (Finland) Vilma Koivisto
- (Finland) Nana Yang
- (France) Adeline Coquard
- (France) Thelma Eninger
- (France) Célina Ould Hocine
- (Germany) Gia Corley
- (Greece) Alexia Mikrouli
- (Greece) Chrysanthi Voila
- (Iceland) Eva Rut Ásþórsdóttir
- (Iceland) Ída Marín Hermannsdóttir
- (Israel) Tal Faingezicht
- (Italy) Federica Anghileri
- (Italy) Asia Bragonzi
- (Italy) Serena Landa
- (Netherlands) Chasity Grant
- (Netherlands) Ella Peddemors
- (Norway) Julie Blakstad
- (Norway) Mathilde Hauge Harviken
- (Norway) Joshualyn Favour Revees
- (Poland) Natalia Padilla
- (Poland) Paulina Tomasiak
- (Portugal) Marta Ferreira
- (Portugal) Francisca Nazareth
- (Portugal) Ana Teles
- (Republic of Ireland) Alannah McEvoy
- (Russia) Maria Kozik
- (Serbia) Milica Denda
- (Serbia) Nikolina Plavšić
- (Slovakia) Victoria Kaláberová
- (Slovenia) Ana Milovič
- (Spain) Irene López
- (Sweden) Evelyn Ijeh
- (Sweden) Kajsa Lang
- (Sweden) Sara Lilja Vidlund
- (Sweden) Hanna Lundkvist
- (Wales) Morgan Rogers

1 goal

- (Austria) Carina Brunold
- (Austria) Celina Degen
- (Austria) Sophie Hillebrand
- (Austria) Linda Mittermair
- (Austria) Maria Plattner
- (Azerbaijan) Dilara Soley Deli
- (Belarus) Darya Tatarin
- (Belarus) Kristina Tikhvodova
- (Belarus) Viktoriya Valyuk
- (Belgium) Constance Brackman
- (Belgium) Noa Corbeels
- (Belgium) Fran Meersman
- (Belgium) Zenia Mertens
- (Bosnia and Herzegovina) Selma Hasić
- (Bosnia and Herzegovina) Alma Krajnić
- (Bosnia and Herzegovina) Sofija Krajšumović
- (Bosnia and Herzegovina) Ajla Zukić
- (Czech Republic) Klára Cvrčková
- (Czech Republic) Tereza Lišková
- (Denmark) Sofie Bredgaard
- (Denmark) Josefine Hasbo
- (Denmark) Cornelia Kramer
- (Denmark) Ea Maiken Rasmussen
- (Denmark) Mathilde Rasmussen
- (Denmark) Sarah Sundahl
- (England) Katie Bradley
- (England) Lucy Roberts
- (Faroe Islands) Jensa Kannuberg Tórolvsdóttir
- (Finland) Jenna Topra
- (France) Jamila Hamidou
- (France) Leila Peneau
- (France) Naomie Vagre
- (Germany) Pauline Berning
- (Germany) Leonie Köster
- (Germany) Pauline Wimmer
- (Greece) Eirini Gatoudi
- (Greece) Ioanna Pachaki
- (Greece) Loukia Prifti
- (Greece) Eleni-Nikoleta Saich
- (Hungary) Bernadett Stefán
- (Iceland) Linda Líf Boama
- (Iceland) Birta Georgsdóttir
- (Iceland) Helena Ósk Hálfdánardóttir
- (Iceland) Karen Sigurgeirsdóttir
- (Iceland) Katla María Þórðardóttir
- (Iceland) Karólína Lea Vilhjálmsdóttir
- (Israel) Irena Kuznezov
- (Israel) Shalev Polishuk
- (Israel) Noa Selimhodzic
- (Italy) Paola Boglioni
- (Italy) Ludovica Silvioni
- (Kosovo) Erjona Emërllahu
- (Kosovo) Albulena Fejza
- (Kosovo) Anjeza Rexhepi
- (Latvia) Ieva Krasnova
- (Montenegro) Ana Knežević
- (Montenegro) Ðurđevac Nađa
- (Netherlands) Dana Foederer
- (Netherlands) Gwyneth Hendriks
- (Netherlands) Naomi Hilhorst
- (Netherlands) Lobke Loonen
- (Netherlands) Jonna van de Velde
- (Netherlands) Kirsten van de Westeringh
- (Netherlands) Moisa van Koot
- (Northern Ireland) Kelsie Burrows
- (Northern Ireland) Alexandra Collighan
- (Northern Ireland) Toni Leigh Finnegan
- (Northern Ireland) Caitlin McGuinness
- (Northern Ireland) Rebecca McKenna
- (Northern Ireland) Jessica Rea
- (Northern Ireland) Beth Smyth
- (Norway) Emilie Marie Joramo
- (Norway) Runa Lillegård
- (Norway) Madeleine Hille Mellemstrand
- (Norway) Marthine Østenstad
- (Poland) Nicola Brzęczek
- (Poland) Kinga Kozak
- (Portugal) Ana Albuquerque
- (Portugal) Beatriz Tomás Barbosa
- (Portugal) Andreia Jacinto
- (Republic of Ireland) Aoife Slattery
- (Republic of Ireland) Jessica Ziu
- (Romania) Krisztina Beno
- (Romania) Bianca Ienovan
- (Romania) Carmen Marcu
- (Romania) Madalina Maria Tatar
- (Russia) Elena Brusova
- (Russia) Anastasiya Govor
- (Russia) Tatyana Petrova
- (Russia) Anastasiya Trenkina
- (Scotland) Aisha Maughan
- (Scotland) Rebecca McGowan
- (Scotland) Brogan Moore
- (Scotland) Hannah Scott
- (Scotland) Jennifer Smith
- (Serbia) Andjela Krstić
- (Serbia) Živana Stupar
- (Slovakia) Kristína Kollárová
- (Slovakia) Viktória Nagy
- (Slovakia) Kristína Panáková
- (Slovakia) Stela Semanová
- (Slovakia) Kristína Tipulová
- (Slovenia) Eva Potočnik
- (Spain) Jana Fernández
- (Spain) Paola Hernández
- (Spain) Nerea Nevado
- (Spain) Leire Peña
- (Sweden) Hanna Andersson
- (Sweden) Hanna Bennison
- (Switzerland) Sophie Bohner
- (Switzerland) Ardita Iseni
- (Switzerland) Yllka Kadriu
- (Turkey) Şehriban Dülek
- (Turkey) Cansu Gürel
- (Ukraine) Oksana Bilokur
- (Ukraine) Iryna Kotiash
- (Ukraine) Anastasiia Nemets
- (Ukraine) Nadiia Veherych
- (Wales) Alice Griffiths

1 own goal

- (Croatia) Karla Šabašov (against Poland)
- (Faroe Islands) Julia Helena Dal Henriksen (against Czech Republic)
- (Montenegro) Jovana Miladinović (against Republic of Ireland)
- (Turkey) Kevser Kartal (against Denmark)

2 own goals

- (Armenia) Anyuta Galstyan (both against Belgium)
