= 2021 UEFA Women's Under-19 Championship qualification =

Tournament details
- Dates: Qualifying round: Cancelled (originally February 2021); Elite round: Abolished; Play-offs: Cancelled (originally April 2021)
- Teams: 49 (from 1 confederation)

The 2021 UEFA Women's Under-19 Championship qualifying competition was a women's under-19 football competition that was to determine the seven teams joining the automatically qualified hosts Belarus in the 2021 UEFA Women's Under-19 Championship final tournament. Players born on or after 1 January 2002 were eligible to participate.

Apart from Belarus, 49 of the remaining 54 UEFA member national teams entered the qualifying competition, with Andorra making their debut, where the original format consisted of two rounds: Qualifying round, which would have taken place in autumn 2020, and Elite round, which would also have taken place in spring 2021. However, due to the COVID-19 pandemic in Europe, UEFA announced on 13 August 2020 that after consultation with the 55 member associations, the qualifying round was delayed to February 2021, and the elite round was abolished and replaced by play-offs, contested in April 2021 by the 12 qualifying round group winners, the best runners-up, and the top seed by coefficient ranking, Spain (which originally received a bye to the elite round), to determine the teams qualifying for the final tournament.

On 23 February 2021, the UEFA Executive Committee announced the cancellation of the 2021 championship due to the ongoing COVID-19 pandemic after consulting all member associations.

== Format ==
The qualifying competition originally consisted of the following two rounds:

- Qualifying round: Apart from Spain, which received a bye to the elite round as the team with the highest seeding coefficient, the remaining 48 teams were drawn into 12 groups of four teams. Each group was to be played in single round-robin format at one of the teams selected as hosts after the draw. The 12 group winners, the 12 runners-up, and the three third-placed teams with the best record against the first and second-placed teams in their group were to advance to the elite round.
- Elite round: The 28 teams were drawn into seven groups of four teams. Each group was to be played in single round-robin format at one of the teams selected as hosts after the draw. The seven group winners were to qualify for the final tournament.

After the format change, the qualifying competition consisted of the following two rounds:

- Qualifying round: The draw remained the same as before. The 12 group winners, the runners-up with the best record against the first and third-placed teams in their group, and Spain, which originally received a bye to the elite round, were to advance to the play-offs.
- Play-offs: The 14 teams were to be drawn into seven ties. The seven winners were to qualify for the final tournament.

== Qualifying round ==
=== Draw ===
The draw for the qualifying round was held on 29 November 2019, 10:00 CET (UTC+1), at the UEFA headquarters in Nyon, Switzerland.

The teams were seeded according to their coefficient ranking, calculated based on the following:

- 2016 UEFA Women's Under-19 Championship final tournament and qualifying competition (qualifying round and elite round)
- 2017 UEFA Women's Under-19 Championship final tournament and qualifying competition (qualifying round and elite round)
- 2018 UEFA Women's Under-19 Championship final tournament and qualifying competition (qualifying round and elite round)
- 2019 UEFA Women's Under-19 Championship final tournament and qualifying competition (qualifying round and elite round)

Each group contained one team from Pot A, one team from Pot B, one team from Pot C, and one team from Pot D. Based on the decisions taken by the UEFA Emergency Panel, the following pairs of teams could not be drawn in the same group: Russia and Ukraine, Russia and Kosovo, Serbia and Kosovo, Bosnia and Herzegovina and Kosovo, Azerbaijan and Armenia.

Final tournament hosts: Team / Coeff. / Rank; **Belarus** / 4.333 / —	Bye to elite round: Team / Coeff. / Rank; Spain / 32.000 / 1

Teams entering qualifying round

Pot A
Team	Coeff.	Rank
France	29.278	2
Germany	27.556	3
Netherlands	24.889	4
Norway	19.778	5
Switzerland	16.444	6
Denmark	16.333	7
England	16.167	8
Italy	15.222	9
Finland	12.833	10
Scotland	12.778	11
Belgium	12.722	12
Czech Republic	12.000	13

Pot B
Team	Coeff.	Rank
Sweden	12.000	14
Republic of Ireland	11.667	15
Austria	11.667	16
Poland	10.167	17
Hungary	10.000	18
Iceland	9.333	19
Portugal	9.167	20
Russia	9.000	21
Serbia	9.000	22
Slovakia	8.833	23
Slovenia	8.667	24
Northern Ireland	7.667	25

Pot C
Team	Coeff.	Rank
Turkey	7.500	26
Ukraine	6.500	27
Azerbaijan	6.333	28
Greece	6.000	29
Wales	4.167	30
Israel	3.500	31
Bosnia and Herzegovina	3.333	32
Croatia	3.333	33
Romania	3.000	34
Bulgaria	2.667	35
Albania	2.333	36
Montenegro	2.000	37

Pot D
Team	Coeff.	Rank
Faroe Islands	2.000	38
Kosovo	1.667	39
Latvia	1.333	40
Lithuania	1.000	41
North Macedonia	1.000	42
Moldova	1.000	43
Georgia	0.333	44
Estonia	0.333	45
Cyprus	0.000	46
Kazakhstan	0.000	47
Armenia	0.000	48
Andorra	—	49

Notes

- Teams marked in **bold** have qualified for the final tournament.

Did not enter
Gibraltar	Luxembourg	Liechtenstein
Malta	San Marino	

=== Groups ===
The qualifying round was originally scheduled to be played during one of the two FIFA women's international windows, either 14–22 September or 19–27 October 2020, but all groups were later rescheduled to the window of 23 November – 1 December. However, due to the COVID-19 pandemic in Europe, UEFA announced on 13 August 2020 that after consultation with the 55 member associations, the qualifying round was delayed to February 2021 before its cancellation.

Times are CET (UTC+1), as listed by UEFA (local times, if different, are in parentheses).

==== Group 1 ====
Originally scheduled to be played between 21–27 October, later rescheduled to 25 November – 1 December 2020.

Pos	Team	Pld	W	D	L	GF	GA	GD	Pts	Qualification
1	Czech Republic	0	0	0	0	0	0	0	**0**	Play-offs
2	Portugal (H)	0	0	0	0	0	0	0	**0**	Play-offs if best runner-up
3	Romania	0	0	0	0	0	0	0	**0**	
4	Latvia	0	0	0	0	0	0	0	**0**	

Source: UEFA
Rules for classification: Tiebreakers
(H) Hosts
18 February 2021

Czech Republic	Cancelled	Latvia
	Report

18 February 2021

Romania	Cancelled	Portugal
	Report

21 February 2021

Czech Republic	Cancelled	Romania
	Report

21 February 2021

Portugal	Cancelled	Latvia
	Report

24 February 2021

Portugal	Cancelled	Czech Republic
	Report

24 February 2021

Latvia	Cancelled	Romania
	Report

==== Group 2 ====
Originally scheduled to be played between 20–26 October, later rescheduled to 24 November – 1 December 2020.

Pos	Team	Pld	W	D	L	GF	GA	GD	Pts	Qualification
1	Italy	0	0	0	0	0	0	0	**0**	Play-offs
2	Serbia (H)	0	0	0	0	0	0	0	**0**	Play-offs if best runner-up
3	Ukraine	0	0	0	0	0	0	0	**0**	
4	Andorra	0	0	0	0	0	0	0	**0**	

Source: UEFA
Rules for classification: Tiebreakers
(H) Hosts
18 February 2021

Italy	Cancelled	Andorra
	Report

18 February 2021

Ukraine	Cancelled	Serbia
	Report

21 February 2021

Italy	Cancelled	Ukraine
	Report

21 February 2021

Serbia	Cancelled	Andorra
	Report

24 February 2021

Serbia	Cancelled	Italy
	Report

24 February 2021

Andorra	Cancelled	Ukraine
	Report

==== Group 3 ====
Originally scheduled to be played between 21–27 October, later rescheduled to 25 November – 1 December 2020.

Pos	Team	Pld	W	D	L	GF	GA	GD	Pts	Qualification
1	France	0	0	0	0	0	0	0	**0**	Play-offs
2	Slovakia	0	0	0	0	0	0	0	**0**	Play-offs if best runner-up
3	Wales (H)	0	0	0	0	0	0	0	**0**	
4	North Macedonia	0	0	0	0	0	0	0	**0**	

Source: UEFA
Rules for classification: Tiebreakers
(H) Hosts
18 February 2021

France	Cancelled	North Macedonia
	Report

18 February 2021

Wales	Cancelled	Slovakia
	Report

21 February 2021

France	Cancelled	Wales
	Report

21 February 2021

Slovakia	Cancelled	North Macedonia
	Report

24 February 2021

Slovakia	Cancelled	France
	Report

24 February 2021

North Macedonia	Cancelled	Wales
	Report

==== Group 4 ====
Originally scheduled to be played between 21–27 October, later rescheduled to 25 November – 1 December 2020.

Pos	Team	Pld	W	D	L	GF	GA	GD	Pts	Qualification
1	Germany	0	0	0	0	0	0	0	**0**	Play-offs
2	Austria	0	0	0	0	0	0	0	**0**	Play-offs if best runner-up
3	Croatia (H)	0	0	0	0	0	0	0	**0**	
4	Kazakhstan	0	0	0	0	0	0	0	**0**	

Source: UEFA
Rules for classification: Tiebreakers
(H) Hosts
18 February 2021

Germany	Cancelled	Kazakhstan
	Report

18 February 2021

Croatia	Cancelled	Austria
	Report

21 February 2021

Germany	Cancelled	Croatia
	Report

21 February 2021

Austria	Cancelled	Kazakhstan
	Report

24 February 2021

Austria	Cancelled	Germany
	Report

24 February 2021

Kazakhstan	Cancelled	Croatia
	Report

==== Group 5 ====
Originally scheduled to be played between 21–27 October, later rescheduled to 25 November – 1 December 2020.

Pos	Team	Pld	W	D	L	GF	GA	GD	Pts	Qualification
1	Norway	0	0	0	0	0	0	0	**0**	Play-offs
2	Poland (H)	0	0	0	0	0	0	0	**0**	Play-offs if best runner-up
3	Bosnia and Herzegovina	0	0	0	0	0	0	0	**0**	
4	Faroe Islands	0	0	0	0	0	0	0	**0**	

Source: UEFA
Rules for classification: Tiebreakers
(H) Hosts
18 February 2021

Norway	Cancelled	Faroe Islands
	Report

18 February 2021

Bosnia and Herzegovina	Cancelled	Poland
	Report

21 February 2021

Norway	Cancelled	Bosnia and Herzegovina
	Report

21 February 2021

Poland	Cancelled	Faroe Islands
	Report

24 February 2021

Poland	Cancelled	Norway
	Report

24 February 2021

Faroe Islands	Cancelled	Bosnia and Herzegovina
	Report

==== Group 6 ====
Originally scheduled to be played between 21–27 October, later rescheduled to 25 November – 1 December 2020.

Pos	Team	Pld	W	D	L	GF	GA	GD	Pts	Qualification
1	Scotland (H)	0	0	0	0	0	0	0	**0**	Play-offs
2	Hungary	0	0	0	0	0	0	0	**0**	Play-offs if best runner-up
3	Montenegro	0	0	0	0	0	0	0	**0**	
4	Estonia	0	0	0	0	0	0	0	**0**	

Source: UEFA
Rules for classification: Tiebreakers
(H) Hosts
16 February 2021

Scotland	Cancelled	Estonia
	Report

16 February 2021

Montenegro	Cancelled	Hungary
	Report

19 February 2021

Scotland	Cancelled	Montenegro
	Report

19 February 2021

Hungary	Cancelled	Estonia
	Report

22 February 2021

Hungary	Cancelled	Scotland
	Report

22 February 2021

Estonia	Cancelled	Montenegro
	Report

==== Group 7 ====
Originally scheduled to be played between 21–27 October, later rescheduled to 25 November – 1 December 2020.

Pos	Team	Pld	W	D	L	GF	GA	GD	Pts	Qualification
1	Belgium (H)	0	0	0	0	0	0	0	**0**	Play-offs
2	Sweden	0	0	0	0	0	0	0	**0**	Play-offs if best runner-up
3	Azerbaijan	0	0	0	0	0	0	0	**0**	
4	Cyprus	0	0	0	0	0	0	0	**0**	

Source: UEFA
Rules for classification: Tiebreakers
(H) Hosts
18 February 2021

Belgium	Cancelled	Cyprus
	Report

18 February 2021

Azerbaijan	Cancelled	Sweden
	Report

21 February 2021

Belgium	Cancelled	Azerbaijan
	Report

21 February 2021

Sweden	Cancelled	Cyprus
	Report

24 February 2021

Sweden	Cancelled	Belgium
	Report

24 February 2021

Cyprus	Cancelled	Azerbaijan
	Report

==== Group 8 ====
Originally scheduled to be played between 21–27 October, later rescheduled to 25 November – 1 December 2020.

Pos	Team	Pld	W	D	L	GF	GA	GD	Pts	Qualification
1	Switzerland	0	0	0	0	0	0	0	**0**	Play-offs
2	Northern Ireland	0	0	0	0	0	0	0	**0**	Play-offs if best runner-up
3	Turkey	0	0	0	0	0	0	0	**0**	
4	Armenia (H)	0	0	0	0	0	0	0	**0**	

Source: UEFA
Rules for classification: Tiebreakers
(H) Hosts
17 February 2021

Switzerland	Cancelled	Armenia
	Report

17 February 2021

Turkey	Cancelled	Northern Ireland
	Report

20 February 2021

Switzerland	Cancelled	Turkey
	Report

20 February 2021

Northern Ireland	Cancelled	Armenia
	Report

23 February 2021

Northern Ireland	Cancelled	Switzerland
	Report

23 February 2021

Armenia	Cancelled	Turkey
	Report

==== Group 9 ====
Originally scheduled to be played between 21–27 October, later rescheduled to 25 November – 1 December 2020.

Pos	Team	Pld	W	D	L	GF	GA	GD	Pts	Qualification
1	Denmark	0	0	0	0	0	0	0	**0**	Play-offs
2	Russia	0	0	0	0	0	0	0	**0**	Play-offs if best runner-up
3	Albania (H)	0	0	0	0	0	0	0	**0**	
4	Moldova	0	0	0	0	0	0	0	**0**	

Source: UEFA
Rules for classification: Tiebreakers
(H) Hosts
18 February 2021

Denmark	Cancelled	Moldova
	Report

18 February 2021

Albania	Cancelled	Russia
	Report

21 February 2021

Denmark	Cancelled	Albania
	Report

21 February 2021

Russia	Cancelled	Moldova
	Report

24 February 2021

Russia	Cancelled	Denmark
	Report

24 February 2021

Moldova	Cancelled	Albania
	Report

==== Group 10 ====
Originally scheduled to be played between 21–27 October, later rescheduled to 25 November – 1 December 2020.

Pos	Team	Pld	W	D	L	GF	GA	GD	Pts	Qualification
1	Netherlands (H)	0	0	0	0	0	0	0	**0**	Play-offs
2	Slovenia	0	0	0	0	0	0	0	**0**	Play-offs if best runner-up
3	Israel	0	0	0	0	0	0	0	**0**	
4	Lithuania	0	0	0	0	0	0	0	**0**	

Source: UEFA
Rules for classification: Tiebreakers
(H) Hosts
17 February 2021

Netherlands	Cancelled	Lithuania
	Report

17 February 2021

Israel	Cancelled	Slovenia
	Report

20 February 2021

Netherlands	Cancelled	Israel
	Report

20 February 2021

Slovenia	Cancelled	Lithuania
	Report

23 February 2021

Slovenia	Cancelled	Netherlands
	Report

23 February 2021

Lithuania	Cancelled	Israel
	Report

==== Group 11 ====
Originally scheduled to be played between 21–27 October, later rescheduled to 25 November – 1 December 2020.

Pos	Team	Pld	W	D	L	GF	GA	GD	Pts	Qualification
1	Finland	0	0	0	0	0	0	0	**0**	Play-offs
2	Iceland	0	0	0	0	0	0	0	**0**	Play-offs if best runner-up
3	Bulgaria (H)	0	0	0	0	0	0	0	**0**	
4	Georgia	0	0	0	0	0	0	0	**0**	

Source: UEFA
Rules for classification: Tiebreakers
(H) Hosts
18 February 2021

Finland	Cancelled	Georgia
	Report

18 February 2021

Bulgaria	Cancelled	Iceland
	Report

21 February 2021

Finland	Cancelled	Bulgaria
	Report

21 February 2021

Iceland	Cancelled	Georgia
	Report

24 February 2021

Iceland	Cancelled	Finland
	Report

24 February 2021

Georgia	Cancelled	Bulgaria
	Report

==== Group 12 ====
Originally scheduled to be played between 21–27 October, later rescheduled to 25 November – 1 December 2020.

Pos	Team	Pld	W	D	L	GF	GA	GD	Pts	Qualification
1	England	0	0	0	0	0	0	0	**0**	Play-offs
2	Republic of Ireland	0	0	0	0	0	0	0	**0**	Play-offs if best runner-up
3	Greece (H)	0	0	0	0	0	0	0	**0**	
4	Kosovo	0	0	0	0	0	0	0	**0**	

Source: UEFA
Rules for classification: Tiebreakers
(H) Hosts
17 February 2021

England	Cancelled	Kosovo
	Report

17 February 2021

Greece	Cancelled	Republic of Ireland
	Report

20 February 2021

England	Cancelled	Greece
	Report

20 February 2021

Republic of Ireland	Cancelled	Kosovo
	Report

23 February 2021

Republic of Ireland	Cancelled	England
	Report

23 February 2021

Kosovo	Cancelled	Greece
	Report

=== Ranking of second-placed teams ===
To determine the best second-placed team from the qualifying round which advances to the play-offs, only the results of the second-placed teams against the first and third-placed teams in their group are taken into account.

Pos	Grp	Team	Pld	W	D	L	GF	GA	GD	Pts	Qualification
1	1	Group 1 second place	0	0	0	0	0	0	0	0	Play-offs
2	2	Group 2 second place	0	0	0	0	0	0	0	0	
3	3	Group 3 second place	0	0	0	0	0	0	0	0	
4	4	Group 4 second place	0	0	0	0	0	0	0	0	
5	5	Group 5 second place	0	0	0	0	0	0	0	0	
6	6	Group 6 second place	0	0	0	0	0	0	0	0	
7	7	Group 7 second place	0	0	0	0	0	0	0	0	
8	8	Group 8 second place	0	0	0	0	0	0	0	0	
9	9	Group 9 second place	0	0	0	0	0	0	0	0	
10	10	Group 10 second place	0	0	0	0	0	0	0	0	
11	11	Group 11 second place	0	0	0	0	0	0	0	0	
12	12	Group 12 second place	0	0	0	0	0	0	0	0	

Source: UEFA
Rules for classification: 1) points; 2) goal difference; 3) goals scored; 4) disciplinary points; 5) coefficient ranking; 6) drawing of lots.

== Elite round ==
The draw for the elite round would originally be held on 8 December 2020 at the UEFA headquarters in Nyon, Switzerland, and the matches were originally scheduled to be played in spring 2021. However, due to the COVID-19 pandemic in Europe, UEFA announced on 13 August 2020 that after consultation with the 55 member associations, the elite round was abolished and replaced by play-offs.

== Play-offs ==
The 14 teams were to be drawn into seven ties. The seven winners were to qualify for the final tournament. The play-offs were scheduled to be played in April 2021.

Qualified teams

- Spain
- Group 1 winner
- Group 2 winner
- Group 3 winner
- Group 4 winner
- Group 5 winner
- Group 6 winner
- Group 7 winner
- Group 8 winner
- Group 9 winner
- Group 10 winner
- Group 11 winner
- Group 12 winner
- Best runner-up

Times are CEST (UTC+2), as listed by UEFA (local times, if different, are in parentheses).

== Qualified teams ==
The following eight teams were to qualify for the final tournament.

Team	Qualified as	Qualified on	Previous appearances in Women's Under-19 Euro^{1} only U-19 era (since 2002)
Belarus	Hosts	24 September 2019	1 (2009)
TBD	Play-off winners	April 2021	
TBD	Play-off winners	April 2021	
TBD	Play-off winners	April 2021	
TBD	Play-off winners	April 2021	
TBD	Play-off winners	April 2021	
TBD	Play-off winners	April 2021	
TBD	Play-off winners	April 2021	

^{1} Bold indicates champions for that year. Italic indicates hosts for that year.
