= 2011 UEFA Women's Under-19 Championship first qualifying round =

Football tournament qualification stage

2011 UEFA Women's U-19 Championship First Qualifying Round will be the first round of qualifications for the Final Tournament of 2011 UEFA Women's Under-19 Championship. They will be played in September 2010. 44 teams are split into 11 groups of 4 and teams in each group play each other once. Italy received byes to the final as host. The top two teams in each group and the best third-placed team entered the 2011 UEFA Women's U-19 Championship Second qualifying round to join Germany.

== Groups ==
=== Group 1 ===
Team	Pld	W	D	L	GF	GA	GD	Pts
England	3	3	0	0	15	0	+15	9
Finland	3	2	0	1	9	2	+7	6
Moldova	3	1	0	2	2	8	−6	3
Armenia	3	0	0	3	0	16	−16	0

11 September 2010

England	4–0	Moldova

Zimbru Stadium, Chișinău

11 September 2010

Finland	5–0	Armenia

District Sport Complex, Orhei

13 September 2010

England	9–0	Armenia

District Sport Complex, Orhei

13 September 2010

Moldova	0–4	Finland

Zimbru Stadium, Chișinău

16 September 2010

Finland	0–2	England

District Sport Complex, Orhei

16 September 2010

Armenia	0–2	Moldova

Zimbru Stadium, Chișinău

=== Group 2 ===
Azerbaijan withdrew from the competition before playing a game.

Team	Pld	W	D	L	GF	GA	GD	Pts
Belgium	2	2	0	0	10	0	+10	6
Lithuania	2	1	0	1	1	4	−3	3
Estonia	2	0	0	2	0	7	−7	0
Azerbaijan	0	0	0	0	0	0	0	0

11 September 2010

Belgium	4–0	Lithuania

Sūduva Stadium, Marijampolė

11 September 2010

Estonia	Match cancelled	Azerbaijan

13 September 2010

Belgium	Match cancelled	Azerbaijan

13 September 2010

Lithuania	1–0	Estonia

Sūduva Stadium, Marijampolė

16 September 2010

Estonia	0–6	Belgium

Sūduva Stadium, Marijampolė

16 September 2010

Azerbaijan	Match cancelled	Lithuania

=== Group 3 ===
Team	Pld	W	D	L	GF	GA	GD	Pts
Spain	3	2	1	0	12	1	+11	7
Denmark	3	2	1	0	7	1	+6	7
Greece	3	1	0	2	3	10	−7	3
Bosnia and Herzegovina	3	0	0	3	0	9	−9	0

11 September 2010

Denmark	4–0	Greece

Stadion Grbavica, Grbavica

11 September 2010

Spain	5–0	Bosnia and Herzegovina

Asim Ferhatović Hase Stadium, Sarajevo

13 September 2010

Denmark	2–0	Bosnia and Herzegovina

Asim Ferhatović Hase Stadium, Sarajevo

13 September 2010

Greece	0–6	Spain

Stadion Grbavica, Grbavica

16 September 2010

Spain	1–1	Denmark

Asim Ferhatović Hase Stadium, Sarajevo

16 September 2010

Bosnia and Herzegovina	0–3	Greece

Stadion Grbavica, Grbavica

=== Group 4 ===
Team	Pld	W	D	L	GF	GA	GD	Pts
Austria	3	3	0	0	21	0	+21	9
Portugal	3	2	0	1	8	4	+4	6
Hungary	3	1	0	2	7	10	−3	3
Latvia	3	0	0	3	0	22	−22	0

11 September 2010

Austria	4–0	Portugal

Tatabánya Városi, Tatabánya

11 September 2010

Hungary	7–0	Latvia

Globall Football Park, Telki

13 September 2010

Austria	10–0	Latvia

Tatabánya Városi, Tatabánya

13 September 2010

Portugal	3–0	Hungary

Globall Football Park, Telki

16 September 2010

Hungary	0–7	Austria

Globall Football Park, Telki

16 September 2010

Latvia	0–5	Portugal

Tatabánya Városi, Tatabánya

=== Group 5 ===
Team	Pld	W	D	L	GF	GA	GD	Pts
Switzerland	3	3	0	0	11	2	+9	9
Poland	3	2	0	1	8	5	+3	6
Macedonia	3	1	0	2	5	7	−2	3
Kazakhstan	3	0	0	3	1	11	−10	0

11 September 2010

Switzerland	3–2	Macedonia

Mladost, Strumica

11 September 2010

Poland	5–0	Kazakhstan

Stadium FC Turnovo, Strumica

13 September 2010

Switzerland	4–0	Kazakhstan

Mladost, Strumica

13 September 2010

Macedonia	1–3	Poland

Stadium FC Turnovo, Strumica

16 September 2010

Poland	0–4	Switzerland

Mladost, Strumica

16 September 2010

Kazakhstan	1–2	Macedonia

Stadium FC Turnovo, Strumica

=== Group 6 ===
Team	Pld	W	D	L	GF	GA	GD	Pts
France	3	3	0	0	17	1	+16	9
Wales	3	2	0	1	26	7	+19	6
Slovenia	3	1	0	2	17	5	+12	3
Georgia	3	0	0	3	0	47	−47	0

11 September 2010

Wales	21–0	Georgia

Stojnci Sports Park, Stojnci

11 September 2010

France	1–0	Slovenia

Ob Jezeru, Velenje

13 September 2010

Wales	4–2	Slovenia

Šmartno Stadium, Šmartno ob Paki

13 September 2010

Georgia	0–11	France

Ob Jezeru, Velenje

16 September 2010

France	5–1	Wales

Stojnci Stadium, Stojnci

16 September 2010

Slovenia	15–0	Georgia

Šmartno Stadium, Šmartno ob Paki

=== Group 7 ===
Team	Pld	W	D	L	GF	GA	GD	Pts
Netherlands	3	2	1	0	19	2	+17	7
Norway	3	2	1	0	13	1	+12	7
Faroe Islands	3	0	1	2	1	13	−12	1
Belarus	3	0	1	2	0	17	−17	1

11 September 2010

Netherlands	9–1	Faroe Islands

Sarpsborg Stadion, Sarpsborg

11 September 2010

Norway	8–0	Belarus

Sarpsborg Stadion, Sarpsborg

13 September 2010

Belarus	0–9	Netherlands

Sarpsborg Stadion, Sarpsborg

13 September 2010

Norway	4–0	Faroe Islands

Sarpsborg Stadion, Sarpsborg

16 September 2010

Netherlands	1–1	Norway

Melløs Stadion, Moss

16 September 2010

Faroe Islands	0–0	Belarus

Lisleby Stadium, Fredrikstad

=== Group 8 ===
Team	Pld	W	D	L	GF	GA	GD	Pts
Scotland	3	2	1	0	8	3	+5	7
Sweden	3	2	0	1	6	1	+5	6
Serbia	3	1	1	1	7	8	−1	4
Slovakia	3	0	0	3	3	12	−9	0

11 September 2010

Scotland	3–3	Serbia

Södermalms IP, Skövde

11 September 2010

Sweden	4–0	Slovakia

Framnäs IP, Lidköping

13 September 2010

Scotland	4–0	Slovakia

Framnäs IP, Lidköping

13 September 2010

Serbia	0–2	Sweden

Ulvesborg IP, Tidaholm

16 September 2010

Sweden	0–1	Scotland

Södermalms IP, Skövde

16 September 2010

Slovakia	3–4	Serbia

Ulvesborg IP, Tidaholm

=== Group 9 ===
Team	Pld	W	D	L	GF	GA	GD	Pts
Czech Republic	3	2	1	0	9	3	+6	7
Turkey	3	1	1	1	4	4	0	4
Northern Ireland	3	1	0	2	4	6	−2	3
Romania	3	1	0	2	4	8	−4	3

11 September 2010

Romania	3–2	Turkey
Vatafu 52', 60'; Herczeg 55'	Report	44', 82' L. Güngör

Víceúcelová sportovní hala, Slaný

11 September 2010

Czech Republic	4–2	Northern Ireland

SK Aritma, Prague

13 September 2010

Romania	1–2	Northern Ireland

Stadion Motorlet, Prague

13 September 2010

Turkey	1–1	Czech Republic
L. Güngör 13'	Report	39' Matoušková

SK Aritma, Prague

16 September 2010

Czech Republic	4–0	Romania

Stadion Motorlet, Prague

16 September 2010

Northern Ireland	0–1	Turkey
	Report	32' L. Güngör

Stadion Lokomotiva Praha, Prague

=== Group 10 ===
Team	Pld	W	D	L	GF	GA	GD	Pts
Iceland	3	3	0	0	8	0	+8	9
Ukraine	3	2	0	1	3	5	−2	6
Israel	3	1	0	2	5	5	0	3
Bulgaria	3	0	0	3	1	7	−6	0

11 September 2010

Iceland	2–0	Bulgaria

Georgi Benkovski, Teteven

11 September 2010

Ukraine	2–1	Israel

Lokomotiv Stadium, Mezdra

13 September 2010

Iceland	2–0	Israel

Lokomotiv Stadium, Mezdra

13 September 2010

Bulgaria	0–1	Ukraine

Georgi Benkovski, Teteven

16 September 2010

Ukraine	0–4	Iceland

Lokomotiv Stadium, Mezdra

16 September 2010

Israel	4–1	Bulgaria

Georgi Benkovski, Teteven

=== Group 11 ===
Team	Pld	W	D	L	GF	GA	GD	Pts
Russia	3	3	0	0	11	0	+11	9
Croatia	3	2	0	1	9	1	+8	6
Republic of Ireland	3	1	0	2	5	4	+1	3
Cyprus	3	0	0	3	0	20	−20	0

11 September 2010

Republic of Ireland	5–0	Cyprus

Gradski vrt, Osijek

11 September 2010

Russia	1–0	Croatia

Gradski vrt, Osijek

13 September 2010

Republic of Ireland	0–1	Croatia

Gradski vrt, Osijek

13 September 2010

Cyprus	0–7	Russia

Gradski vrt, Osijek

16 September 2010

Russia	3–0	Republic of Ireland

Gradski vrt, Osijek

16 September 2010

Croatia	8–0	Cyprus

Olimpija, Osijek

== Ranking of third-placed teams ==
In the ranking of the third-place finishers, only the results against the top two teams count. Serbia advanced as the best third-place finisher having been the only team to draw a match against the top two.

Grp	Team	Pld	W	D	L	GF	GA	GD	Pts
8	Serbia	2	0	1	1	3	5	−2	1
5	Macedonia	2	0	0	2	3	6	−3	0
6	Slovenia	2	0	0	2	2	5	−3	0
9	Northern Ireland	2	0	0	2	2	5	−3	0
10	Israel	2	0	0	2	1	4	−3	0
11	Republic of Ireland	2	0	0	2	0	4	−4	0
2	Estonia	2	0	0	2	0	7	−7	0
1	Moldova	2	0	0	2	0	8	−8	0
4	Hungary	2	0	0	2	0	10	−10	0
3	Greece	2	0	0	2	0	10	−10	0
7	Faroe Islands	2	0	0	2	1	13	−12	0
