= Dilara Soley Deli =

Turkish footballer (born 2002)

Personal information
- Date of birth: 14 April 2002 (age 24)
- Place of birth: Lippstadt, Germany
- Height: 1.77 m (5 ft 10 in)
- Positions: Defender; midfielder

Team information
- Current team: Schalke 04
- Number: 22

Youth career
- 2018–2019: FSV Gütersloh 2009

Senior career*
Years	Team	Apps	(Gls)
2019–2021	Arminia Bielefeld	6	(0)
2021–2022	SV Elversberg	4	(0)
2023–2024	Charleroi	8	(0)
2024	Sporting de Huelva		
2025–	Schalke 04		

International career^{‡}
2018	Azerbaijan U-17	3	(1)
2019	Azerbaijan U-19	6	(1)
2022–	Turkey	2	(0)
- * Club domestic league appearances and goals ‡ National team caps and goals as of 26 September 2023

Dilara Soley Deli (born 14 April 2002) is a footballer who plays as a defender or midfielder for German club Schalke 04. Born in Germany, she plays for the Turkey women's national team. She is a former Azerbaijan youth international.

== Club career ==
Deli started her career in the 2018–19 season in the youth team of FSV Gütersloh 2009 in Germany. She plays in the defender/midfielder position, and is 1.77 m (5 ft 9 1/2 in) tall.

She played for Arminia Bielefeld four matches in the 2019–20 2. Frauen-Bundesliga, two games in the 2019–20 DFB-Pokal Frauen, as well as two matches in the 2020–21 2. Frauen-Bundesliga. She was a member of SV 07 Elversberg in four games in the 2021–22 Regionalliga West season. In the 2021–22 season, she suffered a tear of the Fibular collateral ligament on her knee, and had to stay away from the pitch between 28 March and 6 June 2022.

In the 2023–24 season, she plays for Charleroi in the Belgian Women's Super League. In January 2025, she joined Schalke 04 in Westfalenliga, following a brief stint with Spanish side Sporting de Huelva.

== International career ==
=== Azerbaijan U-17 ===
Playing on 28 March 2018 for Azerbaijan U-17 team at the 2018 UEFA Women's Under-17 Championship qualification, she scored her team's only goal in the match against Iceland. She capped three times in total.

=== Azerbaijan U-19 ===
On 8 October 2019, she scored the winning goal for Azerbaijan U-19 team against Albania at the 2020 UEFA Women's Under-19 Championship qualification. She was in six matches for the Azerbaijan U-19 team.

=== Turkey ===
In June 2022, Deli was called up to the preparation camp of the Turkey team. She was then admitted to the national team, and debuted in the friendly match against Estonia on 17 July 2023 in Tallinn, Estonia. She played at the 2023–24 UEFA Women's Nations League C Group 2 against Lithuania on 26 September 2023.

== Personal life ==
Dilara Soley Deli was born in Lippstadt, North Rhine-Westphalia, Germany on 14 April 2002. She owns double citizenship from Azerbaijan and Turkey.
