= Finland women's national under-19 football team =

Finland Women's U-19
- Association: Football Association of Finland
- Confederation: UEFA (Europe)
- Head coach: Arttu Pitkäkangas
- FIFA code: FIN

First international
- Finland 4–2 Switzerland, (20 July 2005)

Biggest win
- Estonia 0–11 Finland, (22 October 2012); Finland 11–0 Faroe Islands, (5 October 2019)

Biggest defeat
- Finland 0–6 Spain, (9 April 2015)

UEFA Women's Under-19 Championship
- Appearances: 3 (first in 2004)
- Best result: Semi-finals (2005, 2013)

FIFA U-20 Women's World Cup
- Appearances: 2 (first in 2006)
- Best result: Group stage (2006, 2014)

The Finish women's national under-19 football team represents Finland at the UEFA Women's Under-19 Championship and the FIFA U-20 Women's World Cup.

== History ==
=== UEFA Women's Under-19 Championship ===
The Finish team has qualified for the UEFA Women's Under-19 Championship three times, ending in the semi-finals twice and once stranding in the group stage.

Year	Result	Matches	Wins	Draws	Losses	GF	GA
Two-legged final 1998	did not qualify						
(Sweden) 1999	did not qualify						
(France) 2000	did not qualify						
(Norway) 2001	did not qualify						
(Sweden) 2002	did not qualify						
(Germany) 2003	did not qualify						
(Finland) 2004	Group-stage	3	0	0	3	1	10
(Hungary) 2005	Semi-finals	4	2	0	2	7	6
(Switzerland) 2006	did not qualify						
(Iceland) 2007	did not qualify						
(France) 2008	did not qualify						
(Belarus) 2009	did not qualify						
(North Macedonia) 2010	did not qualify						
(Italy) 2011	did not qualify						
(Turkey) 2012	did not qualify						
(Wales) 2013	Semi-finals	4	1	2	1	3	7
(Norway) 2014	did not qualify						
(Israel) 2015	did not qualify						
(Slovakia) 2016	did not qualify						
(Northern Ireland) 2017	did not qualify						
(Switzerland) 2018	did not qualify						
(Scotland) 2019	did not qualify						
(Georgia (country)) ~~2020~~	Cancelled due to the COVID-19 pandemic						
(Belarus) ~~2021~~	Cancelled due to the COVID-19 pandemic						
(Czech Republic) 2022	did not qualify						
(Belgium) 2023	did not qualify						
(Lithuania) 2024	did not qualify						
(Poland) 2025	did not qualify						
(Bosnia and Herzegovina) 2026	did not qualify						
(Hungary) 2027	TBD						
Total	3/26	11	3	2	6	11	23

== See also ==
- Finland women's national football team
- Finland women's national under-17 football team
- FIFA U-20 Women's World Cup
- UEFA Women's Under-19 Championship
