= Fran Meersman =

Belgian footballer

Personal information
- Date of birth: 15 October 2002 (age 24)
- Place of birth: Belgium
- Position: Defender

Team information
- Current team: Anderlecht

Senior career*
Years	Team	Apps	(Gls)
2019–2023	Gent	76	(2)
2023–	Anderlecht	0	(0)

International career^{‡}
2017–2019	Belgium U17	12	(0)
2019	Belgium U19	3	(1)
2021–	Belgium	5	(0)
- * Club domestic league appearances and goals as of 16 July 2023 ‡ National team caps and goals as of 11 March 2023

Fran Meersman (born 15 October 2002) is a Belgian footballer who plays as a defender for Anderlecht and the Belgium national team.

== Career ==
On 15 July 2024, Meersman, along with Tinne Broeckaert, signed a one-year contract extension.

Meersman made her debut for the Belgium national team on 12 June 2021, coming on as a substitute for Davinia Vanmechelen against Luxembourg.
