= Sari Kees =

Belgian footballer (born 2001)

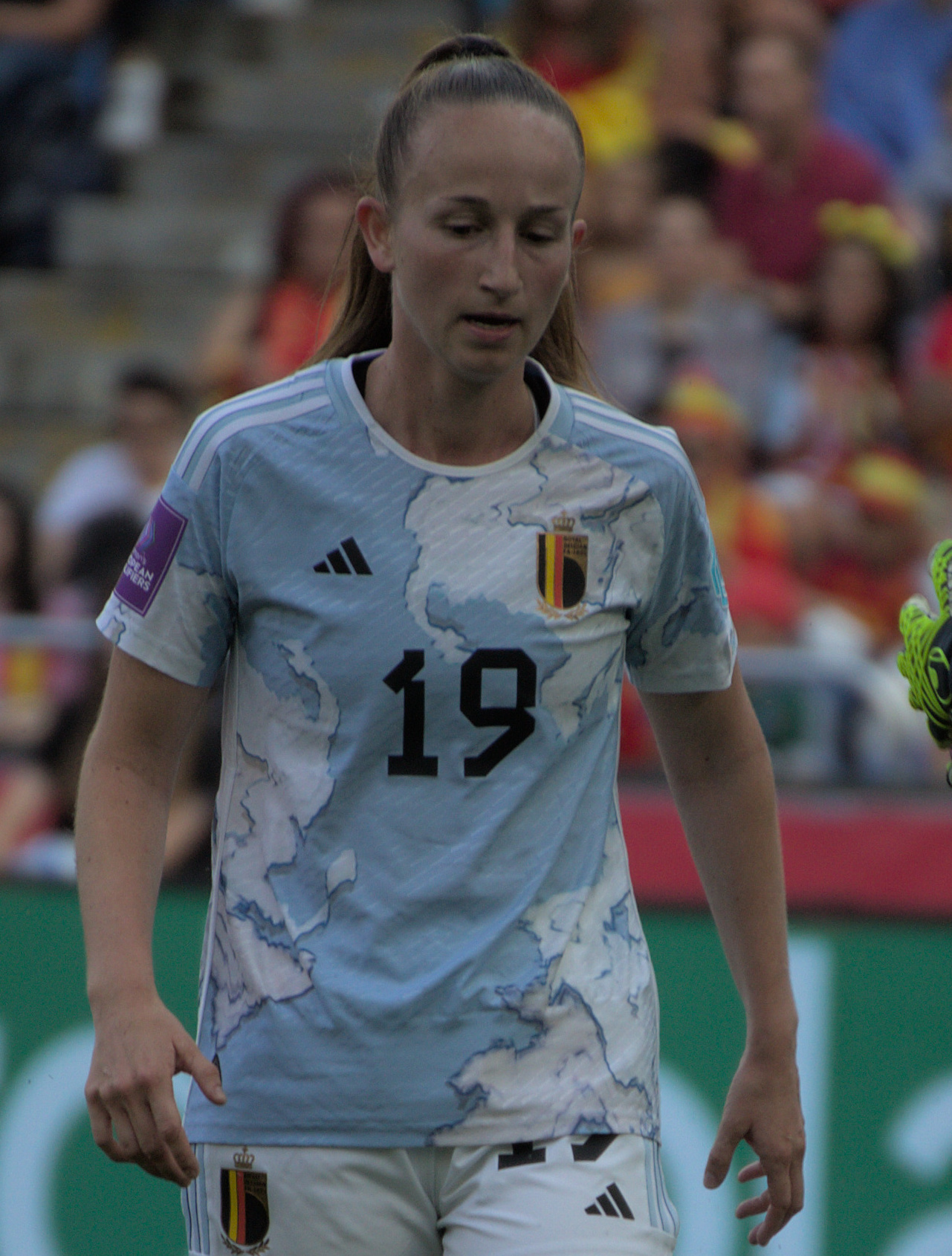
- Kees in 2024

Personal information
- Date of birth: 17 February 2001 (age 25)
- Place of birth: Belgium
- Height: 1.74 m (5 ft 9 in)
- Position: Defender

Team information
- Current team: Ajax
- Number: 4

Youth career
- SP Budingen
- KSV Drieslinter
- OH Leuven

Senior career*
Years	Team	Apps	(Gls)
2016–2019	OH Leuven	43	(8)
2019–2020	Genk	15	(0)
2020–2024	OH Leuven	89	(11)
2024–2026	Leicester City	6	(0)
2026–	Ajax	0	(0)

International career^{‡}
2015	Belgium U15	1	(0)
2015–2017	Belgium U16	4	(1)
2016–2018	Belgium U17	16	(0)
2018–2020	Belgium U19	20	(3)
2021	Belgium U23	2	(0)
2022–	Belgium	52	(6)
- * Club domestic league appearances and goals as of 9 February 2025 ‡ National team caps and goals as of 15 October 2026

Sari Kees (Flemish: [ˈsaːri ˈkeːs]; born 17 February 2001) is a Belgian professional footballer who plays as a defender for Vrouwen Eredivisie club Ajax and the Belgium national team.

== Club career ==
Kees started her youth career as a goalkeeper at SP Budingen. At age 10, she joined OH Leuven, and further developed as a central defender throughout their youth teams for the next eight seasons.

On 12 June 2019, it was announced that Kees joined Racing Genk for one season, becoming a team regular there.

Kees returned to OH Leuven again in April 2020, scoring the winning goal in their 1–0 win against defending champions Anderlecht in March 2022. Leuven ended in second place behind Anderlecht for three straight seasons, from 2020–21 to 2022–23, and in 2023-24 won the regular season only to be overhauled in the title play-offs

Kees stated that her ambitions for the coming years are becoming a full-time member of the national team, and earning a transfer to a foreign club, which came true when she signed for OHL's sister club Leicester City in July 2024.

On 28 July 2026, Kees joined Vrouwen Eredivisie club Ajax on a contract until June 2029.

== International career ==
Kees is a member of the national team since the under-15s. As a central defender, she played for the under-19s in the UEFA U19 Championship in 2019 in their group matches against Spain, Germany and England.

Kees made her debut for the Belgium national team on 16 February 2022, in a 4–0 win against Slovakia in the Pinatar Cup in Spain.

Kees was named in the Belgium squad for UEFA Women's Euro 2022 in England, where the Red Flames were beaten in the quarter-finals 1–0 by Sweden. She went on to contribute to Belgium's successful qualification for UEFA Women's Euro 2025 via the play-offs, starting both legs of the play-off final against Ukraine.

On 11 June 2025, Kees was called up to the Belgium squad for the UEFA Women's Euro 2025.

== Career statistics ==
As of match played 6 October 2022

Appearances and goals by national team and year
National team	Year	Apps	Goals
Belgium U15	2015	1	0
Belgium U16	2015	1	0
Belgium U16	2017	3	1
Belgium U16	Total	4	1
Belgium U17	2016	7	0
Belgium U17	2017	6	0
Belgium U17	2018	3	0
Belgium U17	Total	16	0
Belgium U19	2018	6	0
Belgium U19	2019	13	3
Belgium U19	2020	1	0
Belgium U19	Total	20	3
Belgium U23	2021	2	0
Belgium	2021	1	0
Belgium	2022	13	1
Belgium	Total	14	1
Career total		57	5

No.	Date	Venue	Opponent	Score	Result	Competition
1.	6 September 2022	Yerevan Football Academy Stadium, Yerevan, Armenia	Armenia	7–0	7–0	2023 FIFA Women's World Cup qualification
2.	13 November 2022	Joseph Marien Stadium, Brussels, Belgium	Slovakia	1–0	7–0	Friendly
3.	23 February 2024	Pancho Aréna, Felcsút, Hungary	Hungary	1–1	5–1	2023–24 UEFA Women's Nations League play-offs
4.	23 February 2024	Pancho Aréna, Felcsút, Hungary	Hungary	5–1	5–1	2023–24 UEFA Women's Nations League play-offs
5.	9 April 2024	Viborg Stadium, Viborg, Denmark	Denmark	1–4	2–4	UEFA Women's Euro 2025 qualifying
6.	14 April 2026	Easter Road, Edinburgh, Scotland	Scotland	1–0	1–1	2027 FIFA Women's World Cup qualification

== Honours ==
Belgium

- Pinatar Cup: 2022
