= Nerea Nevado =

Spanish footballer

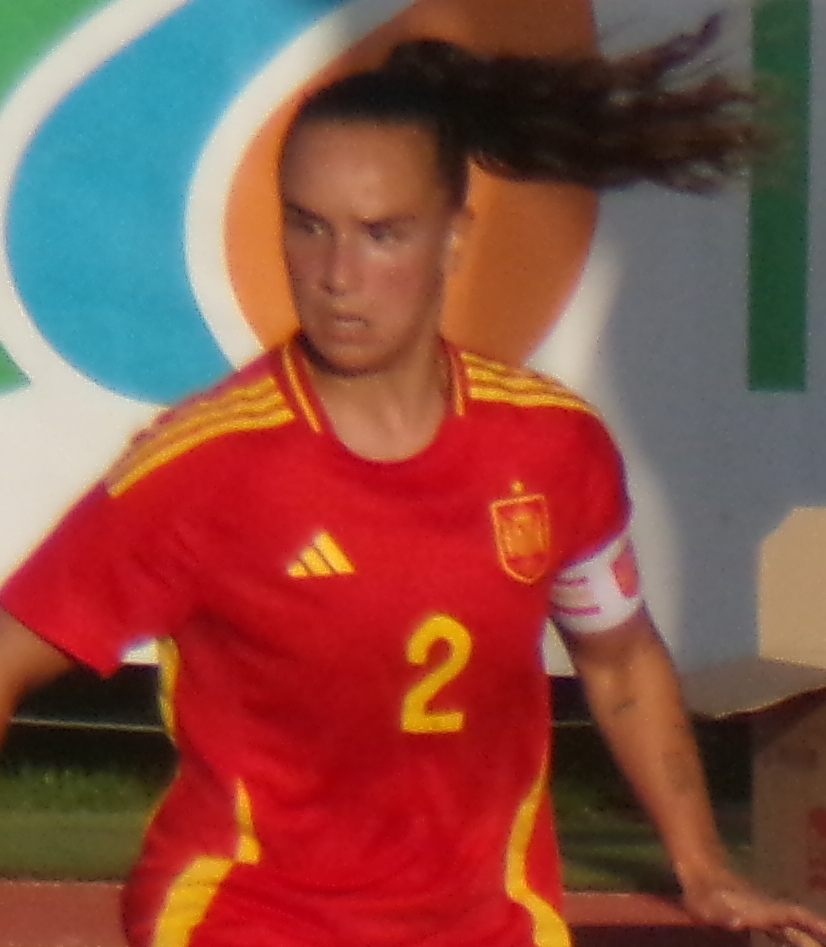
- Nevado playing for Spain U23, 2024

Personal information
- Full name: Nerea Nevado Gómez
- Date of birth: 27 April 2001 (age 25)
- Place of birth: Santurtzi, Spain
- Height: 1.60 m (5 ft 3 in)
- Positions: Left back; left winger

Team information
- Current team: Milan
- Number: 47

Youth career
- 2011–2015: Santurtzi
- 2015–2016: Bizkerre

Senior career*
Years	Team	Apps	(Gls)
2016–2021	Athletic Club B	102	(28)
2018–2026	Athletic Club	130	(8)
2021–2022	→ Alavés	27	(0)
2026–	Milan	0	(0)

International career^{‡}
2018	Spain U17	6	(0)
2019	Spain U19	6	(1)
2022–	Spain U23	12	(0)
2022–	Basque Country	1	(0)
Medal record
Women's football
Representing Spain
FIFA U-17 Women's World Cup
First place	2018 Uruguay
- * Club domestic league appearances and goals as of 2 July 2026 ‡ National team caps and goals as of 07:18, 17 December 2023 (UTC)

Nerea Nevado Gómez (Note: In this Spanish name, the first or paternal surname is Nevado and the second or maternal family name is Gómez.) (born 27 April 2001) is a Spanish professional footballer who plays for Serie A club AC Milan, mainly as a left back. She began her senior career at Athletic Club and also played for Alavés before moving to Italy in 2026.

== Career ==
Nevado began her career as a child with hometown club Santurtzi and with Bizkerre (Getxo), joining Athletic Club in 2016, aged 15. She made over 100 appearances for the B-team over five seasons, as well as featuring intermittently for the senior team from 2018. She moved on loan to Alavés, newly promoted to the top tier, in 2021. At the end of the season, she returned to Athletic and was a regular starter in the 2022–23 Liga F, with previous left-back Ainhoa Moraza having left the club to join Atlético Madrid.

At international level, Nevado was a member of the Spain under-17 squad that won the 2018 FIFA U-17 Women's World Cup in Uruguay. She played in qualifiers for the under-19s ahead of the 2019 UEFA Women's Under-19 Championship but was not selected for the finals squad, and did so again for the 2020 tournament which was cancelled due to the COVID-19 pandemic. She has been selected for the unofficial Basque Country women's national football team, which plays only occasionally, making her first appearance in December 2022 against Chile.

On 1 July 2026, Nevado signed a two-year contract with Serie A club AC Milan.
