= Wales women's national under-19 football team =

National association women's football team

Wales Women's Under-19
- Nickname: Young Dragons (Welsh: Dreigiau Ifanc)
- Association: Football Association of Wales (FAW)
- Confederation: UEFA (Europe)
- Head coach: Nia Davies
- FIFA code: WAL
First colours	Second colours

First international
- Switzerland 1–1 Wales (Becerril de la Sierra, Spain; 4 December 1998)

Biggest win
- Wales 21–0 Georgia; Slovenia; 11 September 2010

Biggest defeat
- Germany 7–0 Wales; Macedonia; 2 October 2007

The Wales women's national under-19 football team, also known as Wales women under-19s or Wales WU19, is a youth association football team operated by the Football Association of Wales. The under-19 team represents Wales in international women's youth football competitions including the UEFA Women's Under-19 Championship. The youth team is intended to prepare players for the senior team, featuring training camps and international friendly fixtures, and can include players who have been capped for the senior team. In August 2024, Nia Davies was appointed as the new head coach for the team, having previously managed the under-17s.

== FIFA U-20 Women's World Cup ==
The team has never qualified for the FIFA U-20 Women's World Cup

Year	Result	Matches	Wins	Draws*	Losses	GF	GA
(Canada) 2002	did not qualify						
(Thailand) 2004	did not qualify						
(Russia) 2006	did not qualify						
(Chile) 2008	did not qualify						
(Germany) 2010	did not qualify						
(Japan) 2012	did not qualify						
(Canada) 2014	did not qualify						
(Papua New Guinea) 2016	did not qualify						
(France) 2018	did not qualify						
(Costa Rica) 2020	Cancelled due to the COVID-19 pandemic						
(Costa Rica) 2022	did not qualify						
(Colombia) 2024	did not qualify						
(Poland) 2026	did not qualify						
Total	0/12	0	0	0	0	0	0

== UEFA Women's Under-19 Championship ==
The team has qualified for the UEFA Women's Under-19 Championship tournaments once, as championship hosts, in 2013.

Year	Round	Position	GP	W	D	L
1998	did not qualify					
(Sweden) 1999	did not qualify					
(France) 2000	did not qualify					
(Norway) 2001	did not qualify					
(Sweden) 2002	did not qualify					
(Germany) 2003	did not qualify					
(Finland) 2004	did not qualify					
(Hungary) 2005	did not qualify					
(Switzerland) 2006	did not qualify					
(Iceland) 2007	did not qualify					
(France) 2008	did not qualify					
(Belarus) 2009	did not qualify					
(North Macedonia) 2010	did not qualify					
(Italy) 2011	did not qualify					
(Turkey) 2012	did not qualify					
(Wales) 2013	did not qualify					
(Norway) 2014	did not qualify					
(Israel) 2015	did not qualify					
(Slovakia) 2016	did not qualify					
(Northern Ireland) 2017	did not qualify					
(Switzerland) 2018	did not qualify					
(Scotland) 2019	did not qualify					
(Georgia (country)) 2020	Cancelled due to the COVID-19 pandemic					
(Belarus) 2021	Cancelled due to the COVID-19 pandemic					
(Czech Republic) 2022	did not qualify					
(Belgium) 2023	did not qualify					
(Lithuania) 2024	did not qualify					
(Poland) 2025	did not qualify					
(Bosnia and Herzegovina) 2026	did not qualify					
(Hungary) 2027	to be determined					

== Current squad ==
The following 20 players were named to the squad for 2025 UEFA Women's Under-19 Championship qualification Round 2 matches in April 2025.

Head coach: Nia Davies

No.	Pos.	Player	Date of birth (age)	Club
	GK	Soffia Kelly	6 March 2007 (age 19)	(The Football Association) Aston Villa
	GK	Cadi Doran	28 May 2007 (age 19)	(The Football Association) Liverpool dual registration with Liverpool Feds
	DF	Amy Richardson	5 January 2006 (age 20)	(Scottish Football Association) Celtic on loan to Partick Thistle
	DF	Evie Hughes	10 June 2006 (age 20)	(The Football Association) Stoke City on loan to Sporting Khalsa
	DF	Casi Evans	10 February 2007 (age 19)	(The Football Association) Blackburn Rovers dual registration with Halifax
	DF	Shurima Vine	1 December 2007 (age 18)	(Football Association of Wales) Gwalia United
	DF	Teagan Scarlett	21 September 2007 (age 19)	(The Football Association) Arsenal
	DF	Scarlett Hill	9 October 2007 (age 19)	(The Football Association) Manchester United
	DF	Charlotte Salisbury-Williams	25 January 2007 (age 19)	(The Football Association) Blackburn Rovers on loan to Halifax
	MF	Charlotte Lee	5 January 2006 (age 20)	(The Football Association) Aston Villa
	MF	Gwen Zimmerman	24 September 2007 (age 19)	(United States Soccer Federation) Eclipse Select
	MF	Elena Cole	8 April 2007 (age 19)	(The Football Association) AFC Bournemouth
	MF	Kiera O'Keefe	6 September 2007 (age 19)	(Football Association of Wales) Gwalia United
	MF	Ffion Bowen	28 September 2007 (age 19)	(The Football Association) Leicester City
	MF	Mared Griffiths	3 March 2007 (age 19)	(The Football Association) Manchester United
	MF	Emily Cole	12 July 2007 (age 19)	(The Football Association) Everton on loan to Liverpool Feds
	FW	Amelie Curtis	23 April 2007 (age 19)	(The Football Association) Bristol City on loan to Cheltenham Town
	FW	Olivia Francis	20 February 2006 (age 20)	(The Football Association) Manchester United dual registration with Liverpool Feds
	FW	Ania Denham	6 March 2007 (age 19)	(The Football Association) Wolverhampton Wanderers on loan to Sporting Khalsa
	FW	Casi Gregson	3 November 2007 (age 19)	(The Football Association) Gwalia United

=== Recent call-ups ===
The following players have also been called up to the Wales under-19 squad within the last twelve months.

Pos.	Player	Date of birth (age)	Caps	Goals	Club	Latest call-up
GK	Cerys Phillips	17 October 2006 (age 20)	-	-	(England) London City Lionesses	v. Scotland, 24 February 2024
DF	Olivia Owen	18 December 2005 (age 20)	-	-	(England) West Bromwich Albion	v. Scotland, 24 February 2024
DF	Mayzee Davies	25 August 2006 (age 20)	-	-	(England) Manchester United	v. Scotland, 24 February 2024
DF	Grace Dunkerley	4 November 2006 (age 20)	-	-	(Wales) The New Saints	v. Scotland, 24 February 2024
MF	Maia Owen	28 November 2006 (age 19)	-	-	(Wales) FAW South Girls Academy	v. Scotland, 24 February 2024
Notes: ^{PRE} = Preliminary squad

== Recent schedule and results ==
This list includes match results from the past, as well as any future matches that have been scheduled.

== Coaching history ==
- Lauren Smith (2018–2019)
- Loren Dykes (2021)
- Nicola Anderson (2021–2024)
- Nia Davies (2024–present)
