= Thelma Eninger =

French footballer (born 2001)

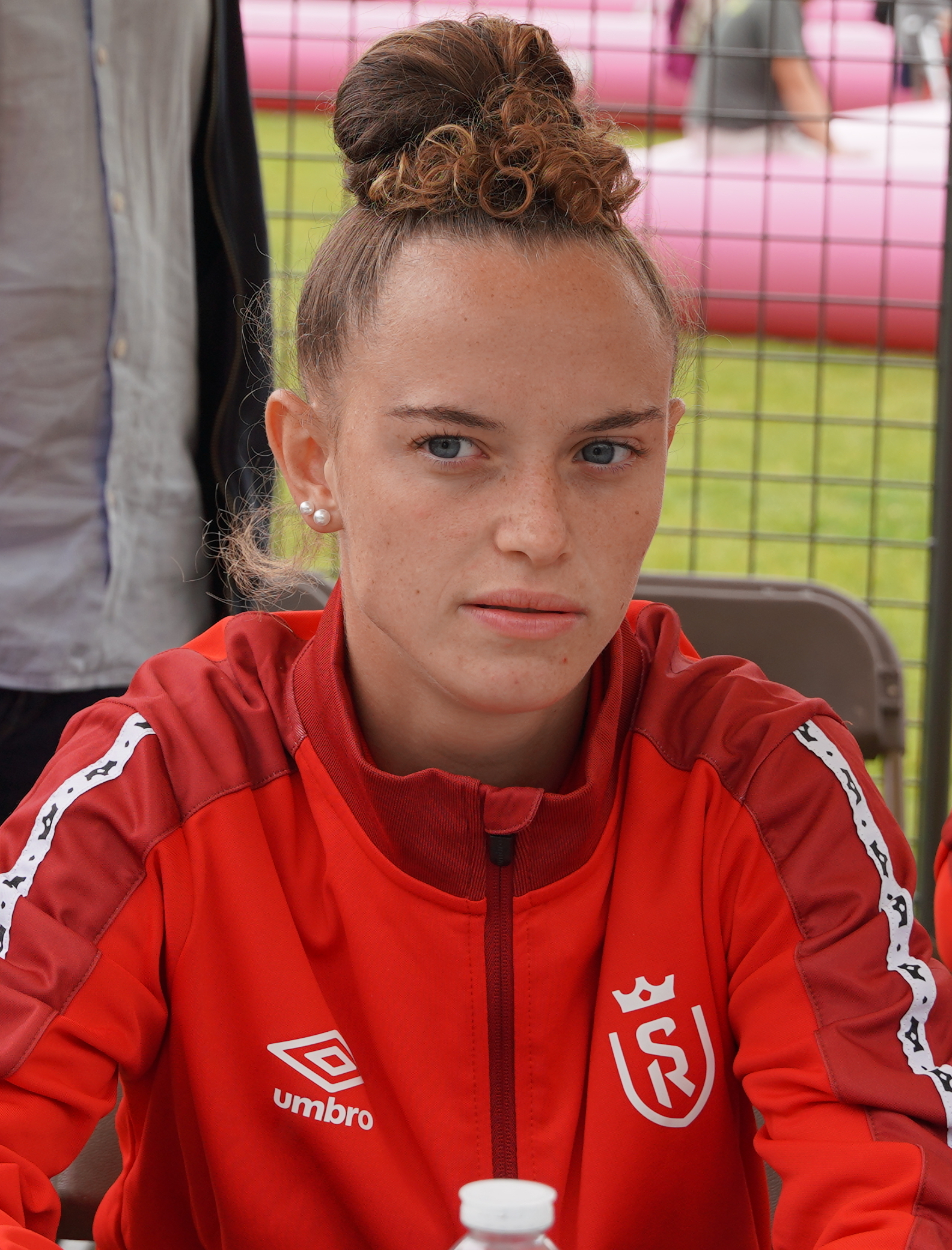
- Eninger in 2023

Personal information
- Date of birth: 23 December 2001 (age 24)
- Place of birth: Clamart, France
- Height: 1.58 m (5 ft 2 in)
- Position: Midfielder

Team information
- Current team: Nantes
- Number: 23

Youth career
- 2012–2013: ASC Vélizy
- 2013–2020: Paris Saint-Germain

Senior career*
Years	Team	Apps	(Gls)
2020–2022	Fleury	18	(0)
2022	Nantes	10	(4)
2022–2024	Reims	33	(1)
2024–2025	Nantes	9	(0)
2025–	Saint-Malo	10	(6)

International career
2019–2020	France U19	10	(4)
Medal record
Women's football
Representing France
UEFA Women's Under-19 Championship
Winner	2019 Scotland
- * Club domestic league appearances and goals as of 16 October 2026

Thelma Eninger (born 23 December 2001) is a French professional footballer who plays as a midfielder for Première Ligue club Saint-Malo.

== Club career ==
=== Fleury ===
Eninger made her league debut against Dijon on 21 November 2020.

=== First spell at Nantes ===
On 26 January 2022, Eninger was announced at FC Nantes on a two year contract until June 2022. She scored her first goal for the club in the Coupe de France féminine against Soyaux on 30 January 2022, scoring a penalty in the 40th minute. Eninger played 10 matches, scoring 4 goals and providing 7 assists during her time at the club.

=== Reims ===
On 24 July 2022, Eninger was announced at Reims on a contract until 2024. She made her league debut against Paris FC on 14 October 2022. Eninger scored her first league goal against Soyaux on 25 March 2023, scoring in the 90th+2nd minute.

=== Second spell at Nantes ===
On 24 July 2024, Eninger was announced at FC Nantes. She made her league debut against Stade de Reims on 19 October 2024.

== International career ==
On 4 February 2019, Eninger was called up to the France U18s for a training camp in Clairefontaine. On 15 May 2019, Eninger scored against US Saint-Malo in a friendly match, scoring in the 43rd minute.

Eninger was called up to the France U19 squad for the UEFA Women's Under-19 Championship Scotland 2019, finishing top of the group.

On 14 September 2019, Eninger was called up to the France U19s for the qualifying phase of the UEFA Women's Under-19 Championship Georgia 2020. She was part of the squad that won the U19 Women's European Championship.

== Style of play ==
Eninger has been described as a strong free kick taker. She describes herself as a technical player who likes to distribute balls quickly to her teammates.
