= Birta Georgsdóttir =

Italian footballer (born 2002)

Personal information
- Date of birth: 23 August 2002 (age 24)
- Place of birth: Garðabær, Iceland
- Position: Forward

Youth career
- 2018-2019: FH
- 2019-2020: Stjarnan
- 2020: FH

Senior career*
Years	Team	Apps	(Gls)
2018-2019	FH	?	(?)
2019-2020	Stjarnan	2	(0)
2020	FH	15	(1)
2021–2025	Breiðablik	97	(38)
2026	Genoa	12	(2)

International career^{‡}
2019	Iceland U17	5	(0)
2019-2021	Iceland U19	8	(1)
2022-	Iceland U23	3	(0)
2026-	Iceland	2	(0)
- * Club domestic league appearances and goals as of 10 June 2026 ‡ National team caps and goals as of 15 October 2026

Birta Georgsdóttir (born 23 August 2002) is an Icelandic footballer who plays as a forward.

== Club career ==
=== Early career ===
Birta Georgsdóttir began her football development with the youth teams of Stjarnan, where she played in her early teens before moving into senior football. She later joined FH (Fimleikafélag Hafnarfjarðar) ahead of the 2018 season, beginning her senior club career as a forward.

=== FH ===
Birta made her senior debut with FH, playing in Iceland's top women's league, with a brief spell back at Stjarnan.

=== Breiðablik ===
In January 2021, Birta signed with Breiðablik, one of Iceland's leading women's football clubs, transferring from FH.

During her years at Breiðablik, she helped the club win Besta deild kvenna, in 2025, and Icelandic Cup again in 2025, moreover she participated in both UEFA club competitions: Champions League and Women's Europa Cup.

Birta's performances improved season by season; for example, in the 2025 campaign she scored 18 goals and provided 7 assists in 21 league matches and was the second-highest scorer in the league, earning the recognition as the best female player in Iceland's top division.

Her time at Breiðablik also included European matches, although in the 2025–26 Women's Europa Cup she appeared without scoring.

=== Genoa ===
In January 2026, Birta Georgsdóttir made her first move abroad, signing a permanent contract with Genoa in Italy's Serie A until 2028. During her first six months at Genoa, she scored two goals in the Italian top flight, although the team was relegated at the end of the season.

== International career ==
Birta represented Iceland at youth levels, featuring for U16, U17, U19 e U23 national teams, for a total of at least 12 appearances and 2 goals.

On 9 June 2026, she made her senior international debut, coming on as a substitute in the 75th minute of Iceland–Spain, a UEFA qualifying group-stage match for the 2027 World Cup against Spain, where Iceland lost 1-6.

== Honours ==
Breiðablik

- Besta deild kvenna: 2025
- Icelandic Women's Football Cup: 2025
