= Ludovica Silvioni =

Italian footballer

Personal information
- Date of birth: 6 March 2002 (age 24)
- Place of birth: Perugia, Italy
- Position: Defender

Team information
- Current team: Bologna
- Number: 8

Youth career
- Roma
- 2017–2018: Grifo Perugia
- 2018–2022: Juventus

Senior career*
Years	Team	Apps	(Gls)
2020–2022	Juventus	0	(0)
2020–2021	→ Pink Bari (loan)	21	(1)
2021–2022	→ Empoli (loan)	20	(0)
2022–2024	Parma	28	(2)
2024–	Bologna		

International career
2018–2019	Italy U17	6	(0)
2019	Italy U19	6	(2)
- * Club domestic league appearances and goals

Ludovica Silvioni (born 6 March 2002) is an Italian professional footballer who plays as a defender for Bologna.
