= Asun Martínez =

Spanish footballer (born 2002)

Personal information
- Full name: Ascensión Martínez Salinas
- Date of birth: 20 February 2002 (age 24)
- Place of birth: Elche, Spain
- Height: 1.60 m (5 ft 3 in)
- Position: Forward

Team information
- Current team: Valencia
- Number: 20

Senior career*
Years	Team	Apps	(Gls)
2016–2017	Elche B		
2016–2017	Elche		
2017–2019	Sporting Plaza Argel		
2019–2020	Valencia B	3	(0)
2019–2025	Valencia	98	(9)

International career^{‡}
2019	Spain U17	7	(0)
2019	Spain U19	3	(3)
2021–	Spain U23	11	(1)
2022	Spain U20	6	(0)
2023–	Spain	2	(0)
Medal record
Women's football
Representing Spain
FIFA U-20 Women's World Cup
Winner	2022 Costa Rica
- * Club domestic league appearances and goals as of 23:26, 22 August 2023 (UTC) ‡ National team caps and goals as of 05:17, 22 December 2023 (UTC)

Ascensión Martínez Salinas (born 20 February 2002), commonly known as Asun, is a Spanish footballer who plays as a forward for Valencia.

== Club career ==
Asun started her career at Elche. In July 2019, she moved to Valencia, giving her the opportunity to play in Spain's top tier for the first time.

== International career ==
Asun made her debut for the Spain national team on 6 April 2023, coming on as a substitute for Salma Paralluelo against Norway.

== Personal life ==
Asun is from a working-class neighbourhood unformally known as La Rata, in Elche. She started playing football from the age of three but was initially encouraged to take up rhythmic gymnastics instead by her mother.

== Honours ==
Spain U20

- FIFA U-20 Women's World Cup: 2022

Individual

- UEFA Women's Under-17 Championship Team of the Tournament: 2019
