= Ana Knežević =

Montenegrin footballer

Personal information
- Date of birth: 18 December 2002 (age 23)
- Position: Forward

Team information
- Current team: Breznica
- Number: 22

Senior career*
Years	Team	Apps	(Gls)
- Breznica

International career^{‡}
2017–2018	Montenegro U17	6	(0)
2019	Montenegro U19	3	(1)
2019–	Montenegro	3	(0)
- * Club domestic league appearances and goals ‡ National team caps and goals as of 10 June 2021.

Ana Knežević (born 18 December 2002) is a Montenegrin footballer who plays as a forward for Montenegrin Women's League club ŽFK Breznica and the Montenegro women's national team.

== Club career ==
Knežević has played for Breznica in Montenegro.

== International career ==
Knežević made her senior debut for Montenegro on 12 June 2019 as a 78th-minute substitution in a 0–0 friendly away draw against Bosnia and Herzegovina.
