= Serena Landa =

Italian footballer (born 2001)

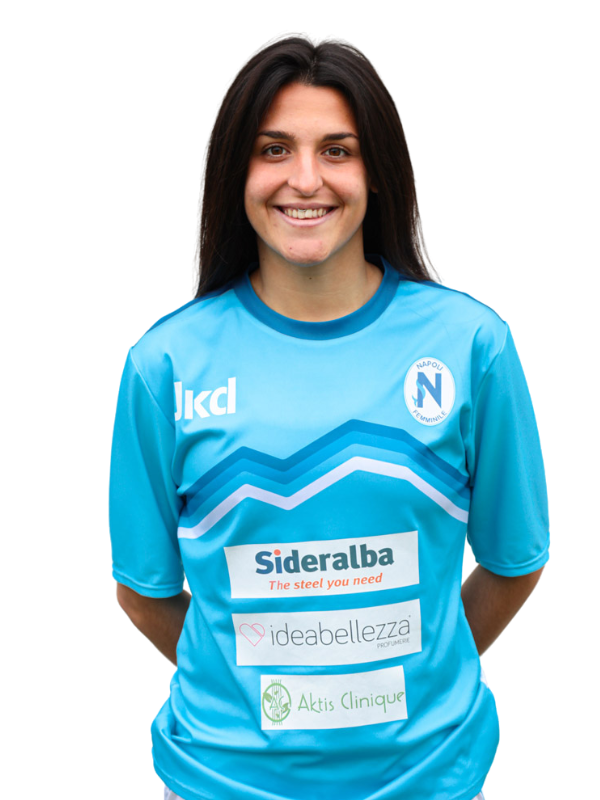
- Serena Landa playing for SSD Napoli

Personal information
- Date of birth: 29 March 2001 (age 25)
- Place of birth: Desio
- Height: 1.87 m (6 ft 2 in)
- Position: Forward

Team information
- Current team: ChievoVerona FM
- Number: 92

Youth career
- 2009–2018: Real Meda
- 2018–2019: Roma C.F.
- 2019–2020: Roma

Senior career*
| Years | Team | Apps | (Gls) |
| 2020–2022 | Roma | 0 | (2) |
| 2021 | → San Marino (loan) | 6 | (1) |
| 2022 | Pomigliano | 7 | (0) |
| 2022–2023 | Napoli | 23 | (0) |
| 2023– | ChievoVerona FM | 0 | (0) |

International career
| 2019 | Italy U19 | 5 | (2) |
- * Club domestic league appearances and goals

Serena Landa (born 29 March 2001) is an Italian footballer who plays as forward for the Italian Serie B club ChievoVerona FM. She graduated to senior football from Roma's youth academy and has represented Italy at U-16, U-17 and U-19 level.

== Club career ==
Landa began playing at eight years old with Real Meda, a Serie C football club based in Landa's native region of Monza-Brienza. Landa would remain with Real Meda for nine years and broke into Italy national youth teams during the same period. Owing to her success in youth football at international level, Serie B club Roma C.F. decided to sign 17-year old forward Landa on a loan deal in 2018, with Landa commenting that the move "could open a lot of opportunities for her future".

Landa was said to have "conquered everyone" with her play and goalscoring during her time with Roma C.F., to the extent that Serie A club A.S. Roma used their links with Roma C.F. to take Landa on loan during the 2019–2020 season and field her in the A.S. Roma Primavera women's U-19 side for the Viareggio Women's Cup of 2020.

Landa would go on to score 4 goals for Roma Primavera and finish as the cup's topscorer, despite Roma Primavera losing the Viareggio cup final in a 3–2 loss to Juventus Primavera (in a game where Landa scored for Roma). By the end of the 2019–2020 season, Landa's prolific form at youth level convinced A.S. Roma to sign her permanently in the summer of 2020. Landa then helped Roma Primavera to win the 2019–2020 Primavera women's league title in the 20 September 2020 victory over Juventus Primavera. The game was rescheduled as a one-off "winner takes all" final due to the suspension of league play during a global pandemic, with Roma Primavera winning the game 2–1 and going an entire league season undefeated.

During the 2020–2021 season, Landa made her first appearances at senior level with A.S. Roma during the club's Coppa Italia campaign. In February 2021, Landa agreed to move on a loan deal to Serie A club San Marino in order to continue getting game time at senior level and try to help San Marino avoid relegation. Landa made her career Serie A debut on 7 February 2021 against A.C. Milan. In the same month, Landa would score her first Serie A goal against Juventus. In April 2021, Landa would suffer a major knee ligament injury during a league game against Hellas Verona. The injury put a premature end to Serena Landa's season and her loan spell with San Marino, as the forward returned to parent-club Roma in order to rehabilitate from injury.
