= Azerbaijan women's national under-19 football team =

National association football team

Azerbaijan Women's U-19
- Association: Association of Football Federations of Azerbaijan
- Confederation: UEFA (Europe)
- Head coach: Habib Aghayev
- FIFA code: AZE

First international
- Ukraine 3–0 Azerbaijan, (27 September 2007)

Biggest win
- Azerbaijan 5–0 Israel, (26 September 2013)

Biggest defeat
- Sweden 10–0 Azerbaijan, (22 October 2012)

UEFA Women's Under-19 Championship
- Appearances: 0

FIFA U-20 Women's World Cup
- Appearances: 0

The Azerbaijan women's national under-19 football team represents Azerbaijan at the UEFA Women's Under-19 Championship and the FIFA U-20 Women's World Cup.

== History ==
=== UEFA Women's Under-19 Championship ===
The Azerbaijani team has never qualified for the UEFA Women's Under-19 Championship.

Year	Result	Matches	Wins	Draws	Losses	GF	GA
Two-legged final 1998	did not Qualify						
(Sweden) 1999	did not Qualify						
(France) 2000	did not Qualify						
(Norway) 2001	did not Qualify						
(Sweden) 2002	did not Qualify						
(Germany) 2003	did not Qualify						
(Finland) 2004	did not Qualify						
(Hungary) 2005	did not Qualify						
(Switzerland) 2006	did not Qualify						
(Iceland) 2007	did not Qualify						
(France) 2008	did not Qualify						
(Belarus) 2009	did not Qualify						
(North Macedonia) 2010	did not Qualify						
(Italy) 2011	did not Qualify						
(Turkey) 2012	did not Qualify						
(Wales) 2013	did not Qualify						
(Norway) 2014	did not Qualify						
(Israel) 2015	did not Qualify						
(Slovakia) 2016	did not Qualify						
(Northern Ireland) 2017	did not Qualify						
(Switzerland) 2018	did not Qualify						
(Scotland) 2019	did not Qualify						
(Georgia (country)) ~~2020~~	Cancelled due to the COVID-19 pandemic						
(Belarus) ~~2021~~	Cancelled due to the COVID-19 pandemic						
(Czech Republic) 2022	did not qualify						
(Belgium) 2023	did not qualify						
(Lithuania) 2024	did not qualify						
(Poland) 2025	did not qualify						
(Bosnia and Herzegovina) 2026	did not qualify						
(Hungary) 2027	TBD						
(Portugal) 2028	TBD						
(Italy) 2029	TBD						
Total	0/26	0	0	0	0	0	0

== See also ==
- Azerbaijan women's national football team
- Azerbaijan women's national under-17 football team
- FIFA U-20 Women's World Cup
- UEFA Women's Under-19 Championship
