= Switzerland women's national under-19 football team =

Switzerland Women's U-19
- Association: Swiss Football Association
- Confederation: UEFA (Europe)
- FIFA code: SUI

First international
- Switzerland 0–3 Denmark, (3 May 2002)

Biggest win
- Switzerland 23–0 Georgia, (17 September 2015)

Biggest defeat
- Switzerland 0–8 Finland, (31 August 2019)

UEFA Women's Under-19 Championship
- Appearances: 9 (first in 2002)
- Best result: Semi-finals (2009, 2011, 2016)

FIFA U-20 Women's World Cup
- Appearances: 3 (first in 2006)
- Best result: Group Stage (2006, 2010, 2012)

The Swiss women's national under-19 football team represents Switzerland at the UEFA Women's Under-19 Championship and the FIFA U-20 Women's World Cup.

== History ==
=== FIFA U-20 Women's World Cup ===
The team has never qualified for the FIFA U-20 Women's World Cup

| Year | Result | Matches | Wins | Draws* | Losses | GF | GA |
|---|---|---|---|---|---|---|---|
| (Canada) 2002 | did not qualify | | | | | | |
| (Thailand) 2004 | did not qualify | | | | | | |
| (Russia) 2006 | Group Stage | 3 | 0 | 0 | 3 | 2 | 14 |
| (Chile) 2008 | did not qualify | | | | | | |
| (Germany) 2010 | Group Stage | 3 | 0 | 0 | 3 | 0 | 11 |
| (Japan) 2012 | Group Stage | 3 | 0 | 0 | 3 | 1 | 8 |
| (Canada) 2014 | did not qualify | | | | | | |
| (Papua New Guinea) 2016 | did not qualify | | | | | | |
| (France) 2018 | did not qualify | | | | | | |
| (Costa Rica) 2020 | Cancelled due to the COVID-19 pandemic | | | | | | |
| (Costa Rica) 2022 | did not qualify | | | | | | |
| (Colombia) 2024 | did not qualify | | | | | | |
| (Poland) 2026 | did not qualify | | | | | | |
| Total | 3/12 | 9 | 0 | 0 | 9 | 3 | 33 |

=== UEFA Women's Under-19 Championship ===
The Swiss team has qualified for the UEFA Women's Under-19 Championship eight times, ending in the semi-finals three times..

| Year | Result | Matches | Wins | Draws | Losses | GF | GA |
|---|---|---|---|---|---|---|---|
| Two-legged final 1998 | did not qualify | | | | | | |
| (Sweden) 1999 | did not qualify | | | | | | |
| (France) 2000 | did not qualify | | | | | | |
| (Norway) 2001 | did not qualify | | | | | | |
| (Sweden) 2002 | Group-stage | 3 | 1 | 0 | 2 | 5 | 8 |
| (Germany) 2003 | did not qualify | | | | | | |
| (Finland) 2004 | Group-stage | 3 | 1 | 0 | 2 | 3 | 8 |
| (Hungary) 2005 | 5th | 4 | 2 | 0 | 2 | 10 | 11 |
| (Switzerland) 2006 | Group-stage | 3 | 1 | 0 | 2 | 3 | 5 |
| (Iceland) 2007 | did not qualify | | | | | | |
| (France) 2008 | did not qualify | | | | | | |
| (Belarus) 2009 | Semi-finals | 4 | 2 | 0 | 2 | 7 | 6 |
| (North Macedonia) 2010 | did not qualify | | | | | | |
| (Italy) 2011 | Semi-finals | 4 | 1 | 1 | 2 | 5 | 5 |
| (Turkey) 2012 | did not qualify | | | | | | |
| (Wales) 2013 | did not qualify | | | | | | |
| (Norway) 2014 | did not qualify | | | | | | |
| (Israel) 2015 | did not qualify | | | | | | |
| (Slovakia) 2016 | Semi-finals | 4 | 2 | 0 | 2 | 9 | 10 |
| (Northern Ireland) 2017 | did not qualify | | | | | | |
| (Switzerland) 2018 | Group-stage | 3 | 1 | 1 | 1 | 5 | 5 |
| (Scotland) 2019 | did not qualify | | | | | | |
| (Georgia (country)) ~~2020~~ | Cancelled due to the COVID-19 pandemic | | | | | | |
| (Belarus) ~~2021~~ | Cancelled due to the COVID-19 pandemic | | | | | | |
| (Czech Republic) 2022 | did not qualify | | | | | | |
| (Belgium) 2023 | did not qualify | | | | | | |
| (Lithuania) 2024 | did not qualify | | | | | | |
| (Poland) 2025 | did not qualify | | | | | | |
| (Bosnia and Herzegovina) 2026 | Group-stage | 3 | 1 | 1 | 1 | 7 | 8 |
| (Hungary) 2027 | TBD | | | | | | |
| Total | 9/27 | 31 | 12 | 3 | 16 | 54 | 66 |

== Head-to-head record ==
The following table shows Switzerland's head-to-head record in the FIFA U-20 Women's World Cup.

| Opponent | Pld | W | D | L | GF | GA | GD | Win %} |
|---|---|---|---|---|---|---|---|---|
| Germany | 1 | 0 | 0 | 1 | 0 | 6 | −6 | 0.00 |
| Ghana | 1 | 0 | 0 | 1 | 0 | 2 | −2 | 0.00 |
| Japan | 1 | 0 | 0 | 1 | 0 | 4 | −4 | 0.00 |
| Mexico | 2 | 0 | 0 | 2 | 2 | 6 | −4 | 0.00 |
| New Zealand | 1 | 0 | 0 | 1 | 1 | 2 | −1 | 0.00 |
| North Korea | 1 | 0 | 0 | 1 | 0 | 4 | −4 | 0.00 |
| South Korea | 1 | 0 | 0 | 1 | 0 | 4 | −4 | 0.00 |
| United States | 1 | 0 | 0 | 1 | 0 | 5 | −5 | 0.00 |
| Total | 9 | 0 | 0 | 9 | 3 | 33 | −30 | 0.00 |

== See also ==
- Switzerland women's national football team
- Switzerland women's national under-17 football team
- FIFA U-20 Women's World Cup
- UEFA Women's Under-19 Championship
