= Belgium women's national under-19 football team =

Belgium Women's U-19
- Association: Royal Belgian Football Association
- Confederation: UEFA (Europe)
- Head coach: Thomas Jansen
- FIFA code: BEL

First international
- Poland 2–3 Belgium, (2 October 2002)

Biggest win
- Belgium 18–0 Georgia, (25 September 2008)

Biggest defeat
- Belgium 0–5 Italy, (1 April 2010); Belgium 0–5 Germany, (19 July 2019)

UEFA Women's Under-19 Championship
- Appearances: 5 (first in 2006)
- Best result: Group-Stage: (2006, 2011, 2014, 2019, 2023)

FIFA U-20 Women's World Cup
- Appearances: 0

The Belgian women's national under-19 football team represents Belgium at the UEFA Women's Under-19 Championship and the FIFA U-20 Women's World Cup.

== History ==
=== UEFA Women's Under-19 Championship ===
The Belgian team has qualified for the UEFA Women's Under-19 Championship five times, but never made it past the group stage.

Year	Result	Matches	Wins	Draws	Losses	GF	GA
Two-legged final 1998	did not qualify						
(Sweden) 1999	did not qualify						
(France) 2000	did not qualify						
(Norway) 2001	did not qualify						
(Sweden) 2002	did not qualify						
(Germany) 2003	did not qualify						
(Finland) 2004	did not qualify						
(Hungary) 2005	did not qualify						
(Switzerland) 2006	Group-stage	3	0	1	2	1	6
(Iceland) 2007	did not qualify						
(France) 2008	did not qualify						
(Belarus) 2009	did not qualify						
(North Macedonia) 2010	did not qualify						
(Italy) 2011	Group-stage	3	0	0	3	3	10
(Turkey) 2012	did not qualify						
(Wales) 2013	did not qualify						
(Norway) 2014	Group-stage	3	0	0	3	1	5
(Israel) 2015	did not qualify						
(Slovakia) 2016	did not qualify						
(Northern Ireland) 2017	did not qualify						
(Switzerland) 2018	did not qualify						
(Scotland) 2019	Group-stage	3	0	0	3	0	8
(Georgia (country)) ~~2020~~	Cancelled due to the COVID-19 pandemic						
(Belarus) ~~2021~~	Cancelled due to the COVID-19 pandemic						
(Czech Republic) 2022	did not qualify						
(Belgium) 2023	Group-stage	3	0	1	2	3	8
(Lithuania) 2024	did not qualify						
(Poland) 2025	did not qualify						
(Bosnia and Herzegovina) 2026	did not qualify						
(Hungary) 2027	TBD						
Total	5/26	15	0	2	13	8	37

== See also ==
- Belgium women's national football team
- Belgium women's national under-17 football team
- FIFA U-20 Women's World Cup
- UEFA Women's Under-19 Championship
