= 2021 UEFA Women's Under-19 Championship =

Tournament details
- Host country: Belarus
- Dates: Cancelled (originally 21 July – 2 August)
- Teams: 8 (from 1 confederation)

The 2021 UEFA Women's Under-19 Championship (also known as UEFA Women's Under-19 Euro 2021) was originally to be held as the 20th edition of the UEFA Women's Under-19 Championship (24th edition if the Under-18 era is included), the annual international youth football championship organised by UEFA for the women's under-19 national teams of Europe. Belarus were originally to host the tournament between 21 July and 2 August 2021. A total of eight teams were originally to play in the tournament, with players born on or after 1 January 2002 eligible to participate. On 23 February 2021, UEFA announced that the tournament was cancelled due to the COVID-19 pandemic in Europe.

Same as previous editions held in odd-numbered years, the tournament would have acted as the UEFA qualifiers for the FIFA U-20 Women's World Cup. The top four teams of the tournament would have qualified for the 2022 FIFA U-20 Women's World Cup in Costa Rica as the UEFA representatives. With the cancellation of the tournament, the UEFA Executive Committee nominated the four teams with the highest coefficient ranking at the time for the qualifying draw (Spain, France, Germany and the Netherlands) as UEFA representatives for the World Cup.

France would have been the defending champions, having won the last tournament held in 2019, with the 2020 edition cancelled due to the COVID-19 pandemic in Europe. For that reason, UEFA announced on 23 February 2021 that this tournament was also cancelled.

== Host selection ==
The timeline of host selection was as follows:

- 11 January 2019: bidding procedure launched
- 28 February 2019: deadline to express interest
- 27 March 2019: Announcement by UEFA that declaration of interest were received from 17 member associations to host one of the UEFA national team youth final tournaments (UEFA European Under-19 Championship, UEFA Women's Under-19 Championship, UEFA European Under-17 Championship, UEFA Women's Under-17 Championship) in 2021 and 2022 (although it was not specified which association were interested in which tournament)
- 28 June 2019: Submission of bid dossiers
- 24 September 2019: Selection of successful host associations by the UEFA Executive Committee at its meeting in Ljubljana

For the UEFA European Women's Under-19 Championship final tournaments of 2021 and 2022, Belarus and Czech Republic were selected as hosts respectively.

== Qualification ==
A total of 50 UEFA nations entered the competition, and with the hosts Belarus qualifying automatically, the original format would have seen the other 49 teams competing in the qualifying competition, which consisted of two rounds: Qualifying round, which would have taken place in autumn 2020, and Elite round, which would have also taken place in spring 2021, to determine the remaining seven spots in the final tournament. However, due to the COVID-19 pandemic in Europe, UEFA announced on 13 August 2020 that after consultation with the 55 member associations, the qualifying round was delayed to February 2021, and the elite round was abolished and replaced by play-offs, supposed to be contested in April 2021 by the 12 qualifying round group winners, the best runners-up, and the top seed by coefficient ranking, Spain (which originally received a bye to the elite round), to determine the teams qualifying for the final tournament.

=== Qualified teams ===
The following teams qualified for the final tournament.

Note: All appearance statistics include only U-19 era (since 2002).

Team	Method of qualification	Appearance	Last appearance	Previous best performance
Belarus	Hosts	2nd	2009	Group stage (2009)
N/A	Play-off winners			
N/A	Play-off winners			
N/A	Play-off winners			
N/A	Play-off winners			
N/A	Play-off winners			
N/A	Play-off winners			
N/A	Play-off winners			

== Qualified teams for FIFA U-20 Women's World Cup ==
The following four teams from UEFA qualified for the 2022 FIFA U-20 Women's World Cup.

Team	Qualified on	Previous appearances in FIFA U-20 Women's World Cup^{1}
Spain	23 February 2021	3 (2004, 2016, 2018)
France	23 February 2021	7 (2002, 2006, 2008, 2010, 2014, 2016, 2018)
Germany	23 February 2021	9 (2002, **2004**, 2006, 2008, **2010**, 2012, **2014**, 2016, 2018)
Netherlands	23 February 2021	1 (2018)

^{1} Bold indicates champions for that year. Italic indicates hosts for that year.
