= 2020 UEFA Women's Under-19 Championship =

Tournament details
- Host country: Georgia
- Dates: Cancelled (originally 21 July – 2 August)
- Teams: 8 (from 1 confederation)

The 2020 UEFA Women's Under-19 Championship (also known as UEFA Women's Under-19 Euro 2020) was originally to be held as the 19th edition of the UEFA Women's Under-19 Championship (23rd edition if the Under-18 era is included), the annual international youth football championship organised by UEFA for the women's under-19 national teams of Europe, before being cancelled due to the COVID-19 pandemic in Europe. Georgia, which were selected by UEFA on 9 December 2016, were originally to host the tournament. A total of eight teams were originally to play in the tournament, with players born on or after 1 January 2001 eligible to participate.

The final tournament was originally scheduled to be played between 21 July to 2 August 2020. Due to the COVID-19 pandemic, UEFA announced on 1 April 2020 that the tournament had been cancelled.

France would have been the defending champions.

== Qualification ==
A total of 49 UEFA nations entered the competition, and with the hosts Georgia qualifying automatically, the other 48 teams competed in the qualifying competition to determine the remaining seven spots in the final tournament. The qualifying competition consists of two rounds: Qualifying round, which takes place in autumn 2019, and Elite round, which takes place in spring 2020.

=== Qualified teams ===
The following teams qualified for the final tournament.

Note: All appearance statistics include only U-19 era (since 2002).

Team	Method of qualification	Appearance	Last appearance	Previous best performance
Georgia	Hosts	1st	—	Debut
TBD	Elite round Group 1 winners			
TBD	Elite round Group 2 winners			
TBD	Elite round Group 3 winners			
TBD	Elite round Group 4 winners			
TBD	Elite round Group 5 winners			
TBD	Elite round Group 6 winners			
TBD	Elite round Group 7 winners			

=== Final draw ===
The final draw was originally to be held on 22 April 2020 in Tbilisi, Georgia. The eight teams would be drawn into two groups of four teams. There would be no seeding, except that the hosts Georgia would be assigned to position A1 in the draw.

== Venues ==
To be confirmed.

== Squads ==
Each national team have to submit a squad of 20 players (Regulations Article 39).

== Group stage ==
The group winners and runners-up advance to the semi-finals.

Tiebreakers

In the group stage, teams are ranked according to points (3 points for a win, 1 point for a draw, 0 points for a loss), and if tied on points, the following tiebreaking criteria are applied, in the order given, to determine the rankings (Regulations Articles 17.01 and 17.02):

1. Points in head-to-head matches among tied teams;
2. Goal difference in head-to-head matches among tied teams;
3. Goals scored in head-to-head matches among tied teams;
4. If more than two teams are tied, and after applying all head-to-head criteria above, a subset of teams are still tied, all head-to-head criteria above are reapplied exclusively to this subset of teams;
5. Goal difference in all group matches;
6. Goals scored in all group matches;
7. Penalty shoot-out if only two teams have the same number of points, and they met in the last round of the group and are tied after applying all criteria above (not used if more than two teams have the same number of points, or if their rankings are not relevant for qualification for the next stage);
8. Disciplinary points (red card = 3 points, yellow card = 1 point, expulsion for two yellow cards in one match = 3 points);
9. UEFA coefficient ranking for the qualifying round draw;
10. Drawing of lots.

All times are local, GET (UTC+4).

=== Group A ===
Pos	Team	Pld	W	D	L	GF	GA	GD	Pts	Qualification
1	Georgia (H)	0	0	0	0	0	0	0	0	Knockout stage
2	A2	0	0	0	0	0	0	0	0	Knockout stage
3	A3	0	0	0	0	0	0	0	0	
4	A4	0	0	0	0	0	0	0	0	

First match(es) will be played: 21 July 2020. Source: UEFA
Rules for classification: Tiebreakers
(H) Hosts
21 July 2020

Georgia	Cancelled	A4

21 July 2020

A3	Cancelled	A2

24 July 2020

Georgia	Cancelled	A3

24 July 2020

A2	Cancelled	A4

27 July 2020

A2	Cancelled	Georgia

27 July 2020

A4	Cancelled	A3

=== Group B ===
Pos	Team	Pld	W	D	L	GF	GA	GD	Pts	Qualification
1	B1	0	0	0	0	0	0	0	0	Knockout stage
2	B2	0	0	0	0	0	0	0	0	Knockout stage
3	B3	0	0	0	0	0	0	0	0	
4	B4	0	0	0	0	0	0	0	0	

First match(es) will be played: 21 July 2020. Source: UEFA
Rules for classification: Tiebreakers
21 July 2020

B1	Cancelled	B4

21 July 2020

B3	Cancelled	B2

24 July 2020

B1	Cancelled	B3

24 July 2020

B2	Cancelled	B4

27 July 2020

B2	Cancelled	B1

27 July 2020

B4	Cancelled	B3

== Knockout stage ==
In the knockout stage, extra time and penalty shoot-out are used to decide the winner if necessary.

=== Bracket ===
Semi-finals
30 July –
Winner Group A
Runner-up Group B
30 July –
Winner Group B
Runner-up Group A

Final
2 August –
Winner Semi-final 1
Winner Semi-final 2

=== Semi-finals ===
30 July 2020

Winner Group A	Cancelled	Runner-up Group B

30 July 2020

Winner Group B	Cancelled	Runner-up Group A

=== Final ===
2 August 2020

Winner Semi-final 1	Cancelled	Winner Semi-final 2
