= 2017 UEFA Women's Under-19 Championship squads =

Player listing of women's football competition

This article describes about the squads for the 2017 UEFA Women's Under-19 Championship in Northern Ireland.

== Group A ==
=== Germany ===
The final squad was announced on 14 July 2017.

Head coach: Maren Meinert

No.	Pos.	Player	Date of birth (age)	Club
1	GK	Lena Pauels	2 February 1998 (aged 19)	(German Football Association) Werder Bremen
12	GK	Vanessa Fischer	18 April 1998 (aged 19)	(German Football Association) Turbine Potsdam
2	DF	Dina Orschmann	8 January 1998 (aged 19)	(German Football Association) Union Berlin
3	DF	Katja Orschmann	8 January 1998 (aged 19)	(German Football Association) Union Berlin
4	DF	Sophia Kleinherne	12 April 2000 (aged 17)	(German Football Association) Eintracht Frankfurt
5	DF	Lisa Schöppl	11 January 2000 (aged 17)	(German Football Association) Wolfsburg
13	DF	Caroline Siems	9 May 1999 (aged 18)	(German Football Association) Turbine Potsdam
14	DF	Sarai Linder	26 October 1999 (aged 17)	(German Football Association) Hoffenheim
15	DF	Tanja Pawollek	18 January 1999 (aged 18)	(German Football Association) Eintracht Frankfurt
6	MF	Janina Minge	11 June 1999 (aged 18)	(German Football Association) Freiburg
7	MF	Giulia Gwinn	2 July 1999 (aged 18)	(German Football Association) Freiburg
8	MF	Kristin Kögel	21 September 1999 (aged 17)	(German Football Association) Sindelfingen
11	MF	Anna Gerhardt	17 April 1998 (aged 19)	(German Football Association) Bayern Munich
16	MF	Luca Graf	19 March 1999 (aged 18)	(German Football Association) Carl Zeiss Jena
9	FW	Klara Bühl	7 December 2000 (aged 16)	(German Football Association) Freiburg
10	FW	Laura Freigang	1 February 1998 (aged 19)	(United States Soccer Federation) Penn State Nittany Lions
17	FW	Annalena Rieke	10 January 1999 (aged 18)	(German Football Association) Carl Zeiss Jena
18	FW	Erëleta Memeti	30 June 1999 (aged 18)	(German Football Association) Sindelfingen

=== Northern Ireland ===
The final squad was announced on 29 July 2017.

Head coach: Alfie Wylie

No.	Pos.	Player	Date of birth (age)	Club
1	GK	Lauren Perry	5 April 2001 (aged 16)	(Irish Football Association) Linfield
12	GK	Kirsty McCaughtry	23 January 1998 (aged 19)	(Irish Football Association) Crusaders
2	DF	Courtney Moore	1 October 1998 (aged 18)	(Irish Football Association) Crusaders
3	DF	Lauren Robson	22 August 1999 (aged 17)	(Irish Football Association) Linfield
4	DF	Emma McMaster	9 March 1999 (aged 18)	(Irish Football Association) Cliftonville
5	DF	Teresa Burns	6 June 1998 (aged 19)	(Irish Football Association) Sion Swifts
13	DF	Yasmin White	7 July 2000 (aged 17)	(Irish Football Association) Glentoran
14	DF	Izzy Coppell	11 September 1999 (aged 17)	(The Football Association) Leicester City
6	MF	Brenna McPartlan	1 September 1999 (aged 17)	(The Football Association) Manchester City
8	MF	Megan Bell	17 April 2001 (aged 16)	(Irish Football Association) Linfield
10	MF	Megan Reilly	2 December 1999 (aged 17)	(United States Soccer Federation) Challenge USA
15	MF	Chloe Orr	17 June 1999 (aged 18)	(Irish Football Association) Mid-Ulster
16	MF	Abbie Magee	15 November 2000 (aged 16)	(Irish Football Association) Linfield
18	MF	Louise McDaniel	24 May 2000 (aged 17)	(Irish Football Association) Linfield
7	FW	Rebecca Bassett	1 April 1999 (aged 18)	(Irish Football Association) Mid-Ulster
9	FW	Emily Wilson	26 August 2001 (aged 15)	(Irish Football Association) Crusaders
11	FW	Leyla McFarland	20 August 2000 (aged 16)	(United States Soccer Federation) USA
17	FW	Morganne Beggs	27 September 2000 (aged 16)	(Irish Football Association) Crusaders

=== Scotland ===
Head coach: Gareth Evans

No.	Pos.	Player	Date of birth (age)	Club
1	GK	Becky Flaherty	6 March 1998 (aged 19)	(The Football Association) Liverpool
12	GK	Erin Clachers	20 June 1999 (aged 18)	(Scottish Football Association) Glasgow City
2	DF	Cailin Michie	2 February 1998 (aged 19)	(Scottish Football Association) Hibernian
3	DF	Ellis Dalgliesh	10 May 1999 (aged 18)	(The Football Association) Durham
4	DF	Donna Patterson	20 November 1998 (aged 18)	(Scottish Football Association) Glasgow City
5	DF	Courtney Whyte	27 May 1998 (aged 19)	(Scottish Football Association) Heart of Midlothian
8	DF	Jamie-Lee Napier	6 April 2000 (aged 17)	(Scottish Football Association) Hibernian
13	DF	Shannon McGregor	7 December 1999 (aged 17)	(Scottish Football Association) Hibernian
6	MF	Sam Kerr	17 April 1999 (aged 18)	(Scottish Football Association) Glasgow City
10	MF	Brogan Hay	1 March 1999 (aged 18)	(Scottish Football Association) Rangers
11	MF	Chantelle Brown	2 October 1998 (aged 18)	(Scottish Football Association) Rangers
14	MF	Claire Adams	16 September 1998 (aged 18)	(Scottish Football Association) Motherwell
16	MF	Ellis Notley	2 February 1999 (aged 18)	(Scottish Football Association) Hibernian
17	MF	Chelsea Cornet	19 April 1998 (aged 19)	(Scottish Football Association) Hibernian
7	FW	Amy Gallacher	15 December 1998 (aged 18)	(Scottish Football Association) Hibernian
9	FW	Kirsty Hanson	17 April 1998 (aged 19)	(The Football Association) Doncaster Rovers Belles
15	FW	Jordan McLintock	13 December 1998 (aged 18)	(Scottish Football Association) Kilwinning
18	FW	Carla Boyce	29 December 1998 (aged 18)	(Scottish Football Association) Glasgow City

=== Spain ===
The final squad was announced on 28 July 2017.

Head coach: Pedro López

No.	Pos.	Player	Date of birth (age)	Club
1	GK	Noelia Ramos	10 February 1999 (aged 18)	(Royal Spanish Football Federation) Levante
13	GK	Misa Rodríguez	22 July 1999 (aged 18)	(Royal Spanish Football Federation) Atlético Madrid
2	DF	Ona Batlle	10 June 1999 (aged 18)	(Royal Spanish Football Federation) Barcelona
3	DF	Ainhoa López	8 January 1999 (aged 18)	(Royal Spanish Football Federation) SE AEM
4	DF	Andrea Sierra	15 May 1998 (aged 19)	(Royal Spanish Football Federation) Athletic Club
5	DF	Natalia Ramos	10 February 1999 (aged 18)	(Royal Spanish Football Federation) Levante
11	DF	Carmen Menayo	14 April 1998 (aged 19)	(Royal Spanish Football Federation) Atlético Madrid
12	DF	Lucía Rodríguez	24 May 1999 (aged 18)	(Royal Spanish Football Federation) Tacón
15	DF	Cinta Rodríguez	7 November 1999 (aged 17)	(Royal Spanish Football Federation) Sporting de Huelva
6	MF	Damaris Egurrola	26 August 1999 (aged 17)	(Royal Spanish Football Federation) Athletic Club
8	MF	Patricia Guijarro	17 May 1998 (aged 19)	(Royal Spanish Football Federation) Barcelona
9	MF	Paula Fernández	1 July 1999 (aged 18)	(Royal Spanish Football Federation) Málaga
10	MF	Maite Oroz	25 March 1998 (aged 19)	(Royal Spanish Football Federation) Athletic Club
14	MF	Aitana Bonmatí	18 January 1998 (aged 19)	(Royal Spanish Football Federation) Barcelona
7	FW	Laura Pérez	15 June 1998 (aged 19)	(Royal Spanish Football Federation) Granada
16	FW	Nuria Rábano	15 June 1999 (aged 18)	(Royal Spanish Football Federation) Deportivo de La Coruña
17	FW	Lucía García	14 July 1998 (aged 19)	(Royal Spanish Football Federation) Athletic Club
18	FW	Anita Marcos	9 July 2000 (aged 17)	(Royal Spanish Football Federation) Atlético Madrid
19	FW	Ane Azkona	15 July 1998 (aged 19)	(Royal Spanish Football Federation) Athletic Club

== Group B ==
=== England ===
The final squad was announced on 12 July 2017.

Head coach: Mo Marley

No.	Pos.	Player	Date of birth (age)	Club
1	GK	Sandy MacIver	18 June 1998 (aged 19)	(United States Soccer Federation) Clemson Tigers
13	GK	Ellie Roebuck	23 September 1999 (aged 17)	(The Football Association) Manchester City
2	DF	Anna Patten	20 April 1999 (aged 18)	(United States Soccer Federation) Florida State Seminoles
3	DF	Maz Pacheco	25 August 1998 (aged 18)	(The Football Association) Doncaster Rovers Belles
5	DF	Grace Fisk	5 January 1998 (aged 19)	(United States Soccer Federation) South Carolina Gamecocks
6	DF	Megan Finnigan	2 April 1998 (aged 19)	(The Football Association) Everton
14	DF	Taylor Hinds	25 April 1999 (aged 18)	(The Football Association) Arsenal
15	DF	Lotte Wubben-Moy	11 January 1999 (aged 18)	(United States Soccer Federation) North Carolina Tar Heels
4	MF	Mollie Rouse	27 November 1998 (aged 18)	(United States Soccer Federation) Louisville Cardinals
8	MF	Georgia Allen	16 June 1998 (aged 19)	(United States Soccer Federation) Syracuse Orange
10	MF	Zoe Cross	6 February 1998 (aged 19)	(United States Soccer Federation) Missouri Tigers
12	MF	Georgia Stanway	3 January 1999 (aged 18)	(The Football Association) Manchester City
17	MF	Niamh Charles	21 June 1999 (aged 18)	(The Football Association) Liverpool
18	MF	Chloe Peplow	3 December 1998 (aged 18)	(The Football Association) Birmingham City
7	FW	Chloe Kelly	15 January 1998 (aged 19)	(The Football Association) Arsenal
9	FW	Ellie Brazil	10 January 1999 (aged 18)	(The Football Association) Birmingham City
11	FW	Rinsola Babajide	17 June 1998 (aged 19)	(The Football Association) Watford
16	FW	Alessia Russo	8 February 1999 (aged 18)	(United States Soccer Federation) North Carolina Tar Heels

=== France ===
Head coach: Gilles Eyquem

No.	Pos.	Player	Date of birth (age)	Club
1	GK	Mylène Chavas	7 January 1998 (aged 19)	(French Football Federation) Saint-Étienne
16	GK	Jade Lebastard	3 May 1998 (aged 19)	(French Football Federation) Guingamp
2	DF	Pauline Dechilly	7 April 1998 (aged 19)	(French Football Federation) Metz
3	DF	Agathe Ollivier	2 April 1998 (aged 19)	(French Football Federation) Guingamp
4	DF	Élisa De Almeida	11 January 1998 (aged 19)	(French Football Federation) Paris
5	DF	Julie Piga	12 January 1998 (aged 19)	(French Football Federation) Grenoble
6	DF	Julie Thibaud	20 April 1998 (aged 19)	(French Football Federation) Bordeaux
12	DF	Léna Goetsch	7 October 1999 (aged 17)	(French Football Federation) Dijon
8	MF	Hélène Fercocq	27 August 1998 (aged 18)	(French Football Federation) Metz
10	MF	Christy Gavory	5 May 1998 (aged 19)	(French Football Federation) Metz
13	MF	Sarah Galera	3 January 1998 (aged 19)	(French Football Federation) Toulouse
14	MF	Lina Boussaha	16 January 1999 (aged 18)	(French Football Federation) PSG
15	MF	Sana Daoudi	12 March 1998 (aged 19)	(French Football Federation) PSG
7	FW	Emelyne Laurent	4 November 1998 (aged 18)	(French Football Federation) Lyon
9	FW	Chloé Pierel	27 March 1999 (aged 18)	(French Football Federation) Saint-Maur
11	FW	Cindy Caputo	7 February 1999 (aged 18)	(French Football Federation) Marseille
17	FW	Mathilde Bourdieu	15 April 1999 (aged 18)	(French Football Federation) Paris
18	FW	Catherine Karadjov	19 June 1998 (aged 19)	(French Football Federation) La Roche-sur-Yon

=== Italy ===
The final squad was announced on 28 July 2017.

Head coach: Enrico Sbardella

No.	Pos.	Player	Date of birth (age)	Club
1	GK	Alessia Piazza	23 March 1998 (aged 19)	(Swiss Football Association) Lugano
12	GK	Alessia Capelletti	13 October 1998 (aged 18)	(Italian Football Federation) Mozzanica
2	DF	Vanessa Panzeri	22 June 2000 (aged 17)	(Italian Football Federation) Como
3	DF	Beatrice Merlo	23 February 1999 (aged 18)	(Italian Football Federation) Inter Milan
5	DF	Alice Tortelli	22 January 1998 (aged 19)	(Italian Football Federation) Fiorentina
6	DF	Sara Mella	14 April 1998 (aged 19)	(Italian Football Federation) Inter Milan
14	DF	Erika Santoro	3 September 1999 (aged 17)	(Italian Football Federation) Fiorentina
17	DF	Martina Lenzini	23 July 1998 (aged 19)	(Italian Football Federation) Inter Milan
4	MF	Federica Cavicchia	8 November 1998 (aged 18)	(Swiss Football Association) Zürich
7	MF	Arianna Caruso	6 November 1999 (aged 17)	(Swiss Football Association) Zürich
8	MF	Giada Greggi	18 February 2000 (aged 17)	(Italian Football Federation) Inter Milan
10	MF	Marta Mascarello	15 October 1998 (aged 18)	(Italian Football Federation) Inter Milan
16	MF	Alice Regazzoli	15 March 1999 (aged 18)	(Italian Football Federation) Inter Milan
9	FW	Gloria Marinelli	12 March 1998 (aged 19)	(Italian Football Federation) Perugia
11	FW	Sofia Cantore	30 September 1999 (aged 17)	(Italian Football Federation) Fiammamonza
13	FW	Sofia Del Stabile	23 July 1998 (aged 19)	(Italian Football Federation) Tavagnacco
15	FW	Annamaria Serturini	13 May 1998 (aged 19)	(Italian Football Federation) Pink Sport Time
18	FW	Benedetta Glionna	26 July 1999 (aged 18)	(Italian Football Federation) Fiammamonza

=== Netherlands ===
The final squad was announced on 30 July 2017.

Head coach: Jessica Torny

No.	Pos.	Player	Date of birth (age)	Club
1	GK	Lize Kop	17 March 1998 (aged 19)	(Royal Dutch Football Association) Ajax
16	GK	Jacintha Weimar	11 June 1998 (aged 19)	(German Football Association) Bayern Munich
2	DF	Noah Waterham	9 April 1999 (aged 18)	(Royal Dutch Football Association) CTO Eindhoven
3	DF	Kay-Lee de Sanders	6 January 1998 (aged 19)	(Royal Dutch Football Association) Ajax
4	DF	Caitlin Dijkstra	30 January 1999 (aged 18)	(Royal Dutch Football Association) CTO Eindhoven
5	DF	Aniek Nouwen	9 March 1999 (aged 18)	(Royal Dutch Football Association) PSV
12	DF	Danique Ypema	20 November 1999 (aged 17)	(Royal Dutch Football Association) CTO Amsterdam
13	DF	Jamie Altelaar	6 April 1999 (aged 18)	(Royal Dutch Football Association) VV Alkmaar
6	MF	Nurija van Schoonhoven	8 February 1998 (aged 19)	(Royal Dutch Football Association) PEC Zwolle
8	MF	Nadine Noordam	29 July 1998 (aged 19)	(Royal Dutch Football Association) ADO Den Haag
10	MF	Victoria Pelova	3 June 1999 (aged 18)	(Royal Dutch Football Association) ADO Den Haag
14	MF	Eva van Deursen	21 January 1999 (aged 18)	(Royal Dutch Football Association) CTO Eindhoven
15	MF	Kayleigh van Dooren	31 July 1999 (aged 18)	(Royal Dutch Football Association) CTO Eindhoven
7	FW	Quinty Sabajo	1 August 1999 (aged 18)	(Royal Dutch Football Association) CTO Amsterdam
9	FW	Joëlle Smits	7 February 2000 (aged 17)	(Royal Dutch Football Association) Twente
11	FW	Ashleigh Weerden	7 June 1999 (aged 18)	(Royal Dutch Football Association) Twente
17	FW	Naomi Pattiwael	21 July 1998 (aged 19)	(Royal Dutch Football Association) CTO Eindhoven
18	FW	Fenna Kalma	21 November 1999 (aged 17)	(Royal Dutch Football Association) Heerenveen
