= 2018 FIFA U-20 Women's World Cup squads =

Each country's final squad has to comprise 21 players. FIFA announced the squads on 25 July 2018.

== Group A ==
=== France ===
Head coach: Gilles Eyquem

No.	Pos.	Player	Date of birth (age)	Club
1	GK	Mylène Chavas	7 January 1998 (aged 20)	(French Football Federation) Dijon FCO
2	DF	Élisa De Almeida	11 January 1998 (aged 20)	(French Football Federation) Paris FC
3	DF	Selma Bacha	9 November 2000 (aged 17)	(French Football Federation) Olympique Lyon
4	DF	Julie Thibaud	20 April 1998 (aged 20)	(French Football Federation) FC Girondins Bordeaux
5	DF	Julie Piga	12 January 1998 (aged 20)	(French Football Federation) Grenoble Foot 38
6	MF	Sana Daoudi	12 March 1998 (aged 20)	(Royal Spanish Football Federation) Atlético Madrid
7	FW	Emelyne Laurent	4 November 1998 (aged 19)	(French Football Federation) Olympique Lyon
8	MF	Hélène Fercocq	27 August 1998 (aged 19)	(French Football Federation) FC Metz
9	FW	Marie-Antoinette Katoto	1 November 1998 (aged 19)	(French Football Federation) Paris Saint-Germain
10	MF	Annahita Zamanian	19 February 1998 (aged 20)	(Swedish Football Association) Kopparbergs/Göteborg FC
11	FW	Melvine Malard	28 June 2000 (aged 18)	(French Football Federation) Olympique Lyon
12	DF	Pauline Dechilly	7 April 1998 (aged 20)	(French Football Federation) FC Metz
13	DF	Maëlle Lakrar	27 May 2000 (aged 18)	(French Football Federation) Montpellier HSC
14	DF	Léna Goetsch	7 October 1999 (aged 18)	(French Football Federation) FC Vendenheim
15	MF	Christy Gavory	5 May 1998 (aged 20)	(French Football Federation) FC Metz
16	GK	Camille Pecharman	7 October 1998 (aged 19)	(French Football Federation) Paris FC
17	MF	Carla Polito	13 January 2000 (aged 18)	(French Football Federation) Lille OSC
18	FW	Marion Rey	25 March 2000 (aged 18)	(Swiss Football Association) FC Basel
19	FW	Amelie Delabre	26 November 2000 (aged 17)	(French Football Federation) FC Metz
20	FW	Sandy Baltimore	19 February 2000 (aged 18)	(French Football Federation) Paris Saint-Germain
21	GK	Justine Lerond	29 February 2000 (aged 18)	(French Football Federation) FC Metz

=== Ghana ===
Head coach: Yusif Basigi

No.	Pos.	Player	Date of birth (age)	Club
1	GK	Esther Agyemang	1 August 1998 (aged 20)	(Ghana Football Association) Immigration Ladies
2	DF	Cecilia Hagan	7 February 2000 (aged 18)	(Ghana Football Association) Sea Lions Ladies FC
3	FW	Ruth Anima	15 October 1998 (aged 19)	(Ghana Football Association) Fabulous Ladies FC
4	DF	Justice Tweneboaa	28 October 2001 (aged 16)	(Ghana Football Association) Ampem Darkoa Ladies
5	DF	Linda Amoako	2 July 1999 (aged 19)	(Ghana Football Association) Soccer Intellectual Ladies
6	MF	Grace Asantewaa	5 December 2000 (aged 17)	(Ghana Football Association) Ampem Darkoa Ladies
7	FW	Rafia-Alhassan Kulchirie	20 December 2001 (aged 16)	(Ghana Football Association) Hasaacas Ladies FC
8	MF	Grace Acheampong	6 September 2000 (aged 17)	(Ghana Football Association) Ash Town Ladies
9	FW	Sandra Owusu-Ansah	29 January 2000 (aged 18)	(Ghana Football Association) Supreme Ladies
10	MF	Ernestina Abambila	30 December 1998 (aged 19)	Unattached
11	MF	Olivia Anokye	1 April 2000 (aged 18)	(Ghana Football Association) Sea Lions Ladies FC
12	DF	Belinda Anane	14 June 1998 (aged 20)	(Ghana Football Association) Fabulous Ladies FC
13	FW	Helena Obeng	13 October 1998 (aged 19)	(Ghana Football Association) Ash Town Ladies
14	DF	Philicity Asuako	25 December 1999 (aged 18)	(Ghana Football Association) Samaria Ladies
15	FW	Patience Peterson-Kundok	29 September 2001 (aged 16)	(Ghana Football Association) Ampem Darkoa Ladies
16	GK	Martha Annan	2 November 1999 (aged 18)	(Ghana Football Association) Sea Lions Ladies FC
17	DF	Evelyn Badu	11 September 2002 (aged 15)	(Ghana Football Association) Hasaacas Ladies FC
18	DF	Shine Agbomadzi	11 June 2001 (aged 17)	(Ghana Football Association) Sea Lions Ladies FC
19	DF	Joyce Asamoah	14 September 2000 (aged 17)	(Ghana Football Association) Fabulous Ladies FC
20	MF	Adu Agyemang	10 January 1998 (aged 20)	(Ghana Football Association) Ash Town Ladies
21	GK	Kerrie McCarthy	22 October 2000 (aged 17)	(Ghana Football Association) Sport Academy

=== New Zealand ===
Head Coach: Gareth Turnbull

No.	Pos.	Player	Date of birth (age)	Club
1	GK	Anna Leat	26 June 2001 (aged 17)	(New Zealand Football) East Coast Bays AFC
2	DF	Sarah Morton	28 August 1998 (aged 19)	(New Zealand Football) Western Springs AFC
3	DF	Rebecca Lake	13 May 1999 (aged 19)	(New Zealand Football) Coastal Spirit FC
4	DF	Elizabeth Anton	12 December 1998 (aged 19)	(New Zealand Football) Western Springs AFC
5	DF	Michaela Foster	9 January 1999 (aged 19)	(New Zealand Football) Hamilton Wanderers AFC
6	MF	Nicole Mettam	7 February 2000 (aged 18)	(New Zealand Football) Eastern Suburbs AFC
7	MF	Hannah Blake	5 May 2000 (aged 18)	(New Zealand Football) Three Kings United
8	MF	Malia Steinmetz	18 January 1999 (aged 19)	(New Zealand Football) Forrest Hill Milford
9	FW	Sam Tawharu	18 January 1999 (aged 19)	(New Zealand Football) Forrest Hill Milford
10	MF	Grace Jale	10 April 1999 (aged 19)	(New Zealand Football) Eastern Suburbs AFC
11	FW	Jacqui Hand	19 February 1999 (aged 19)	(New Zealand Football) Eastern Suburbs AFC
12	MF	Rose Morton	2 May 2000 (aged 18)	(New Zealand Football) Western Springs AFC
13	FW	Paige Satchell	13 April 1998 (aged 20)	(New Zealand Football) Three Kings United
14	DF	Claudia Bunge	21 September 1999 (aged 18)	(New Zealand Football) Glenfield Rovers
15	DF	Tiana Hill	16 July 2000 (aged 18)	(New Zealand Football) Claudelands Rovers
16	FW	Gabi Rennie	7 July 2001 (aged 17)	(New Zealand Football) Waimakariri United AFC
17	FW	Dayna Stevens	4 July 2000 (aged 18)	(New Zealand Football) Glenfield Rovers
18	DF	Aneka Mittendorff	6 August 2001 (aged 16)	(New Zealand Football) Forrest Hill Milford
19	MF	Maggie Jenkins	14 June 2001 (aged 17)	(New Zealand Football) Glenfield Rovers
20	GK	Nadia Olla	7 February 2000 (aged 18)	(New Zealand Football) Western Springs AFC
21	GK	Una Foyle	17 November 1998 (aged 19)	(New Zealand Football) Coastal Spirit FC

=== Netherlands ===
Head Coach: Michel Kreek

No.	Pos.	Player	Date of birth (age)	Club
1	GK	Lize Kop	17 March 1998 (aged 20)	(Royal Dutch Football Association) AFC Ajax
2	DF	Jasmijn Duppen	26 August 1998 (aged 19)	(Royal Dutch Football Association) VV Alkmaar
3	DF	Caitlin Dijkstra	30 January 1999 (aged 19)	(Royal Dutch Football Association) AFC Ajax
4	DF	Sabine Kuilenburg	12 April 1999 (aged 19)	(Royal Dutch Football Association) ADO Den Haag
5	DF	Aniek Nouwen	9 March 1999 (aged 19)	(Royal Dutch Football Association) PSV
6	MF	Eva van Deursen	21 January 1999 (aged 19)	(United States Soccer Federation) Arizona State Sun Devils
7	FW	Bente Jansen	28 August 1999 (aged 18)	(Royal Dutch Football Association) FC Twente
8	FW	Quinty Sabajo	1 August 1999 (aged 19)	(Royal Dutch Football Association) SC Heerenveen
9	FW	Joëlle Smits	7 February 2000 (aged 18)	(Royal Dutch Football Association) FC Twente
10	MF	Nathalie van den Heuvel	17 June 1998 (aged 20)	(Royal Dutch Football Association) SC Heerenveen
11	FW	Ashleigh Weerden	7 June 1999 (aged 19)	(Royal Dutch Football Association) FC Twente
12	DF	Danique Ypema	20 November 1999 (aged 18)	(Royal Dutch Football Association) SC Heerenveen
13	DF	Noah Waterham	9 April 1999 (aged 19)	(Royal Dutch Football Association) AFC Ajax
14	MF	Victoria Pelova	3 June 1999 (aged 19)	(Royal Dutch Football Association) ADO Den Haag
15	DF	Lisa Doorn	8 December 2000 (aged 17)	(Royal Dutch Football Association) AFC Ajax
16	GK	Daphne van Domselaar	6 March 2000 (aged 18)	(Royal Dutch Football Association) FC Twente
17	FW	Naomi Pattiwael	21 July 1998 (aged 20)	(Royal Dutch Football Association) PSV
18	MF	Nurija van Schoonhoven	8 February 1998 (aged 20)	(Royal Dutch Football Association) PSV
19	FW	Fenna Kalma	21 November 1999 (aged 18)	(Royal Dutch Football Association) SC Heerenveen
20	MF	Kim van Velzen	19 January 1998 (aged 20)	(Royal Dutch Football Association) SC Heerenveen
21	GK	Jacintha Weimar	11 June 1998 (aged 20)	(German Football Association) Bayern Munich

== Group B ==
=== Brazil ===
Head Coach: Dorival Bueno

No.	Pos.	Player	Date of birth (age)	Club
1	GK	Nicole	13 April 2000 (aged 18)	(Brazilian Football Confederation) Santos FC
2	DF	Monalisa	1 July 1999 (aged 19)	(Brazilian Football Confederation) EC Iranduba da Amazônia
3	DF	Thaís Regina	27 March 1999 (aged 19)	(Brazilian Football Confederation) Sport Recife
4	DF	Ingryd Avancini	21 December 1998 (aged 19)	(Brazilian Football Confederation) Flamengo
5	MF	Luana	8 September 1998 (aged 19)	(Brazilian Football Confederation) Ferroviária
6	DF	Thais Reiss	9 December 1999 (aged 18)	(United States Soccer Federation) Florida Gators
7	MF	Angelina	26 January 2000 (aged 18)	(Brazilian Football Confederation) Santos FC
8	MF	Karla Alves	23 November 1999 (aged 18)	(Brazilian Football Confederation) Foz Cataratas
9	FW	Geyse Ferreira	27 March 1998 (aged 20)	(Brazilian Football Confederation) AD Centro Olímpico
10	MF	Victória	14 March 1998 (aged 20)	(Brazilian Football Confederation) Minas ICESP/DF
11	FW	Brenda Woch	10 September 1998 (aged 19)	(Brazilian Football Confederation) EC Iranduba da Amazônia
12	GK	Kemelli Trugilho	13 March 1999 (aged 19)	(Brazilian Football Confederation) Flamengo
13	DF	Tainara	21 April 1999 (aged 19)	(Brazilian Football Confederation) EC Vitória
14	DF	Isabella	18 December 1999 (aged 18)	(Brazilian Football Confederation) AA Ponte Preta
15	MF	Katrine	19 April 1998 (aged 20)	(Brazilian Football Confederation) Grêmio Audax
16	DF	Andressa	12 May 1999 (aged 19)	(Brazilian Football Confederation) Flamengo
17	FW	Kerolin Nicoli	17 November 1999 (aged 18)	(Brazilian Football Confederation) AA Ponte Preta
18	MF	Ana Vitória	6 March 2000 (aged 18)	(Brazilian Football Confederation) SC Corinthians
19	GK	Jully	18 April 1999 (aged 19)	(Brazilian Football Confederation) Kindermann
20	MF	Ariadina Borges	28 December 1999 (aged 18)	(Brazilian Football Confederation) Sport Recife
21	FW	Valéria	10 September 1998 (aged 19)	(Brazilian Football Confederation) Grêmio Audax

=== England ===
Head Coach: Mo Marley

No.	Pos.	Player	Date of birth (age)	Club
1	GK	Sandy MacIver	18 June 1998 (aged 20)	(United States Soccer Federation) Clemson Tigers
2	DF	Anna Patten	20 April 1999 (aged 19)	(United States Soccer Federation) Florida State Seminoles
4	MF	Mollie Rouse	27 November 1998 (aged 19)	(United States Soccer Federation) Louisville Cardinals
3	DF	Maz Pacheco	25 August 1998 (aged 19)	(The Football Association) Reading F.C.
5	DF	Grace Fisk	5 January 1998 (aged 20)	(United States Soccer Federation) South Carolina Gamecocks
6	DF	Megan Finnigan	2 April 1998 (aged 20)	(The Football Association) Everton L.F.C.
7	FW	Alessia Russo	8 February 1999 (aged 19)	(United States Soccer Federation) North Carolina Tar Heels
8	MF	Georgia Allen	16 June 1998 (aged 20)	(United States Soccer Federation) Syracuse Orange
9	FW	Lauren Hemp	7 August 2000 (aged 17)	(The Football Association) Manchester City W.F.C.
10	MF	Georgia Stanway	3 January 1999 (aged 19)	(The Football Association) Manchester City W.F.C.
11	FW	Niamh Charles	21 June 1999 (aged 19)	(The Football Association) Liverpool L.F.C.
12	FW	Ali Johnson	24 December 1998 (aged 19)	(The Football Association) Bristol City W.F.C.
13	GK	Ellie Roebuck	23 September 1999 (aged 18)	(The Football Association) Manchester City W.F.C.
14	MF	Chloe Peplow	3 December 1998 (aged 19)	(The Football Association) Brighton & Hove Albion W.F.C.
15	DF	Esme Morgan	18 October 2000 (aged 17)	(The Football Association) Manchester City W.F.C.
16	FW	Chloe Kelly	15 January 1998 (aged 20)	(The Football Association) Everton L.F.C.
17	FW	Rinsola Babajide	17 June 1998 (aged 20)	(The Football Association) Liverpool L.F.C.
18	DF	Taylor Hinds	25 April 1999 (aged 19)	(The Football Association) Everton L.F.C.
19	FW	Charlie Wellings	18 May 1998 (aged 20)	(The Football Association) Birmingham City W.F.C.
20	MF	Zoe Cross	6 February 1998 (aged 20)	(United States Soccer Federation) Missouri Tigers
21	GK	Emily Ramsey	16 November 2000 (aged 17)	(The Football Association) Manchester United W.F.C.

=== Mexico ===
Head Coach: Christopher Cuéllar

No.	Pos.	Player	Date of birth (age)	Club
1	GK	Emily Alvarado	9 June 1998 (aged 20)	(United States Soccer Federation) TCU Horned Frogs
2	DF	Ashley Soto	30 December 1999 (aged 18)	(United States Soccer Federation) USC Trojans
3	DF	Miriam Garcia	14 February 1998 (aged 20)	(Mexican Football Federation) Guadalajara
4	DF	Kimberly Rodriguez	26 March 1999 (aged 19)	(United States Soccer Federation) Oklahoma State Cowgirls
5	DF	Jimena López	30 January 1999 (aged 19)	(United States Soccer Federation) Texas A&M Aggies
6	MF	Maricarmen Reyes	23 April 2000 (aged 18)	(United States Soccer Federation) UCLA Bruins
7	MF	Belén Cruz	7 November 1998 (aged 19)	(Mexican Football Federation) UANL
8	MF	Alexia Delgado	9 December 1999 (aged 18)	(United States Soccer Federation) Arizona State Sun Devils
9	FW	Daniela Espinosa	13 July 1999 (aged 19)	(Mexican Football Federation) América
10	FW	Katty Martínez	14 March 1998 (aged 20)	(Mexican Football Federation) UANL
11	MF	Lizbeth Ovalle	19 October 1999 (aged 18)	(Mexican Football Federation) UANL
12	GK	Wendy Toledo	13 September 2000 (aged 17)	(Mexican Football Federation) Santos Laguna
13	DF	Karen Díaz	2 August 1998 (aged 20)	(Mexican Football Federation) Pachuca
14	MF	Mia Villegas	31 May 2000 (aged 18)	(United States Soccer Federation) San Francisco Dons
15	DF	Athalie Palomo	7 September 2000 (aged 17)	(United States Soccer Federation) FC Dallas
16	MF	Andrea Hernández	20 January 1998 (aged 20)	(Mexican Football Federation) Toluca
17	DF	Natalia Villareal	19 March 1998 (aged 20)	(Mexican Football Federation) UANL
18	FW	Viridiana Salazar	2 January 1998 (aged 20)	(Mexican Football Federation) Pachuca
19	FW	Gabriela Juárez	13 April 2000 (aged 18)	(United States Soccer Federation) Princeton Tigers
20	GK	Zoe Aguirre	3 October 2000 (aged 17)	(United States Soccer Federation) Eastern Kentucky Colonels
21	MF	Montserrat Hernández	26 June 1999 (aged 19)	(Mexican Football Federation) América

=== North Korea ===
Head Coach: Hwang Yong-bong

No.	Pos.	Player	Date of birth (age)	Club
1	GK	Ok Kum-Ju	5 May 1999 (aged 19)	(DPR Korea Football Association) Naegohyang SC
2	MF	An Kuk-hyang	25 March 2001 (aged 17)	(DPR Korea Football Association) April 25 SC
3	DF	Ryang Ryong-mi	20 June 1998 (aged 20)	(DPR Korea Football Association) Sobaeksu SC
4	DF	Sin Jong-hyang	25 January 1999 (aged 19)	(DPR Korea Football Association) Rimyongsu SC
5	DF	Ri Kum-hyang	22 April 2001 (aged 17)	(DPR Korea Football Association) Naegohyang SC
6	DF	Ri Chun-gyong	23 October 1999 (aged 18)	(DPR Korea Football Association) Pyongyang City SC
7	FW	Ja Un-yong	11 August 2001 (aged 16)	(DPR Korea Football Association) April 25 SC
8	MF	Pang Un-sim	29 June 2001 (aged 17)	(DPR Korea Football Association) Naegohyang SC
9	MF	Kim Pom-ui	2 February 1999 (aged 19)	(DPR Korea Football Association) Sobaeksu SC
10	FW	Kim Kyong-yong	2 January 2002 (aged 16)	(DPR Korea Football Association) Naegohyang SC
11	FW	Son Sun-im	9 September 1998 (aged 19)	(DPR Korea Football Association) Wolmido SC
12	MF	Ko Kyong-hui	3 September 2001 (aged 16)	(DPR Korea Football Association) Ryomyong SC
13	MF	An Myong-song	16 August 2001 (aged 16)	(DPR Korea Football Association) Amrokkang SC
14	DF	Ri Yong-mi	26 January 2000 (aged 18)	(DPR Korea Football Association) Naegohyang SC
15	MF	An Song-ok	16 March 1998 (aged 20)	(DPR Korea Football Association) April 25 SC
16	FW	Jang Suk-yong	1 August 1999 (aged 19)	(DPR Korea Football Association) Amrokkang SC
17	FW	Ri Hak	12 June 2002 (aged 16)	(DPR Korea Football Association) Amrokkang SC
18	GK	Kim Yong-sun	2 March 1998 (aged 20)	(DPR Korea Football Association) April 25 SC
19	DF	Ri Pom-hyang	8 June 1999 (aged 19)	(DPR Korea Football Association) Pyongyang City SC
20	MF	Choe Kum-ok	23 February 2002 (aged 16)	(DPR Korea Football Association) Naegohyang SC
21	GK	Ri Jong-sim	12 April 2001 (aged 17)	(DPR Korea Football Association) Amrokkang SC

== Group C ==
=== Japan ===
Head Coach: Futoshi Ikeda

No.	Pos.	Player	Date of birth (age)	Club
1	GK	Aguri Suzuki	13 October 1998 (aged 19)	(Japan Football Association) Vegalta Sendai Ladies
2	DF	Nana Ono	1 May 1999 (aged 19)	(Japan Football Association) Kanagawa University
3	DF	Miyu Takahira	4 November 1999 (aged 18)	(Japan Football Association) Vegalta Sendai Ladies
4	DF	Moeka Minami	7 December 1998 (aged 19)	(Japan Football Association) Urawa Red Diamonds Ladies
5	DF	Riko Ushijima	12 December 1999 (aged 18)	(Japan Football Association) INAC Kobe Leonessa
6	DF	Hana Takahashi	19 February 2000 (aged 18)	(Japan Football Association) Urawa Red Diamonds Ladies
7	MF	Honoka Hayashi	19 May 1998 (aged 20)	(Japan Football Association) Cerezo Osaka Sakai Ladies
8	MF	Yui Fukuta	20 May 1998 (aged 20)	(Japan Football Association) INAC Kobe Leonessa
9	MF	Hinata Miyazawa	28 November 1999 (aged 18)	(Japan Football Association) Nippon TV Beleza
10	MF	Fuka Nagano	9 March 1999 (aged 19)	(Korea Football Association) Hyundai Steel Red-Angels
11	FW	Saori Takarada	27 December 1999 (aged 18)	(Japan Football Association) Cerezo Osaka Sakai Ladies
12	MF	Yurina Imai	20 February 1998 (aged 20)	(Japan Football Association) Nittaidai Fields
13	MF	Asato Miyagawa	24 February 1998 (aged 20)	(Japan Football Association) Nippon TV Beleza
14	FW	Mami Muraoka	11 March 1998 (aged 20)	(Japan Football Association) Orca Kamogawa FC
15	MF	Mizuka Sato	19 September 1998 (aged 19)	(Japan Football Association) JEF United Chiba Ladies
16	FW	Fuka Kono	15 January 1998 (aged 20)	(Japan Football Association) Nittaidai Fields
17	DF	Nanami Kitamura	25 November 1999 (aged 18)	(Japan Football Association) Cerezo Osaka Sakai Ladies
18	GK	Hannah Stambaugh	24 December 1998 (aged 19)	(Japan Football Association) INAC Kobe Leonessa
19	FW	Riko Ueki	30 July 1999 (aged 19)	(Japan Football Association) Nippon TV Beleza
20	MF	Jun Endo	24 May 2000 (aged 18)	(Japan Football Association) JFA Academy Fukushima LSC
21	GK	Mai Fukuta	20 May 1998 (aged 20)	(Japan Football Association) Nittaidai Fields

=== Paraguay ===
Head Coach: Epifania Benítez

No.	Pos.	Player	Date of birth (age)	Club
1	GK	Heidi Salas	20 March 1999 (aged 19)	(Paraguayan Football Association) Cerro Porteño
2	DF	María Vecca	24 May 1999 (aged 19)	(Paraguayan Football Association) Deportivo Capiatá
3	DF	Lorena Alonso	1 April 1998 (aged 20)	(Paraguayan Football Association) Club Olimpia
4	DF	Deisy Ojeda	3 March 2000 (aged 18)	(Paraguayan Football Association) Club Olimpia
5	DF	Limpia Fretes	24 June 2000 (aged 18)	(Paraguayan Football Association) Cerro Porteño
6	MF	Camila González	9 April 1999 (aged 19)	(Paraguayan Football Association) Deportivo Capiatá
7	MF	Rosa Miño	13 July 1999 (aged 19)	(Paraguayan Football Association) Cerro Porteño
8	MF	Fanny Godoy	21 January 1998 (aged 20)	(Paraguayan Football Association) Deportivo Capiatá
9	FW	Fabiola Sandoval	27 May 1999 (aged 19)	(Paraguayan Football Association) Sportivo Luqueño
10	FW	Jessica Martínez	14 June 1999 (aged 19)	(Brazilian Football Confederation) Santos FC
11	MF	Lice Chamorro	22 December 1998 (aged 19)	(Royal Spanish Football Federation) Sporting Huelva
12	GK	Isabel Ortiz	28 December 2001 (aged 16)	(Paraguayan Football Association) Deportivo Humaitá
13	FW	Bianka Ávila	29 October 1999 (aged 18)	(Paraguayan Football Association) 12 de Octubre FC
14	DF	Natalia Villasanti	10 March 2000 (aged 18)	(Paraguayan Football Association) Sporting Huelva
15	MF	Graciela Martínez	24 May 2001 (aged 17)	(Paraguayan Football Association) Cerro Porteño
16	FW	Jessica Sánchez	25 November 2000 (aged 17)	(Paraguayan Football Association) Club Olimpia
17	MF	Dahiana Bogarín	13 November 2000 (aged 17)	(Paraguayan Football Association) Cerro Porteño
18	DF	Daysy Bareiro	19 January 2001 (aged 17)	(Paraguayan Football Association) Cerro Porteño
19	MF	Celeste Aguilera	16 June 1999 (aged 19)	(Paraguayan Football Association) Deportivo Humaitá
20	DF	Ruth Sosa	15 April 1998 (aged 20)	(Paraguayan Football Association) Sporting Huelva
21	GK	Jessica Franco	15 June 2000 (aged 18)	(Paraguayan Football Association) Sportivo Luqueño

=== Spain ===
Head Coach: Pedro López

No.	Pos.	Player	Date of birth (age)	Club
1	GK	María Isabel Rodríguez	22 July 1999 (aged 19)	(Royal Spanish Football Federation) Atlético Madrid
2	DF	Ona Batlle	10 June 1999 (aged 19)	(Royal Spanish Football Federation) Levante UD
3	DF	Berta Pujadas	9 April 2000 (aged 18)	(Royal Spanish Football Federation) RCD Espanyol
4	DF	Laia Aleixandri	25 August 2000 (aged 17)	(Royal Spanish Football Federation) Atlético Madrid
5	DF	Andrea Sierra	15 May 1998 (aged 20)	(Royal Spanish Football Federation) Athletic Club
6	MF	Damaris Egurrola	26 August 1999 (aged 18)	(Royal Spanish Football Federation) Athletic Club
7	FW	Nuria Rábano	15 June 1999 (aged 19)	(Royal Spanish Football Federation) Deportivo
8	MF	Patricia Guijarro	17 May 1998 (aged 20)	(Royal Spanish Football Federation) FC Barcelona
9	MF	Paula Fernández	1 July 1998 (aged 20)	(Royal Spanish Football Federation) Málaga CF
10	MF	Maite Oroz	25 March 1998 (aged 20)	(Royal Spanish Football Federation) Athletic Club
11	DF	Carmen Menayo	14 April 1998 (aged 20)	(Royal Spanish Football Federation) Atlético Madrid
12	DF	Lucía Rodríguez	24 May 1999 (aged 19)	(Royal Spanish Football Federation) CD Tacón
13	GK	Noelia Ramos	10 February 1999 (aged 19)	(Royal Spanish Football Federation) Sevilla FC
14	MF	Aitana Bonmatí	18 January 1998 (aged 20)	(Royal Spanish Football Federation) FC Barcelona
15	FW	Candela Andújar	26 March 2000 (aged 18)	(Royal Spanish Football Federation) FC Barcelona
16	MF	Silvia Rubio	12 October 2000 (aged 17)	(Royal Spanish Football Federation) Madrid CFF
17	FW	Lucía García	14 July 1998 (aged 20)	(Royal Spanish Football Federation) Athletic Club
18	FW	Eva Navarro	27 January 2001 (aged 17)	(Royal Spanish Football Federation) Levante UD
19	MF	Paula Sancho	12 June 1998 (aged 20)	(Royal Spanish Football Federation) Fundación Albacete
20	FW	Clàudia Pina	12 August 2001 (aged 16)	(Royal Spanish Football Federation) FC Barcelona
21	GK	Catalina Coll	23 April 2001 (aged 17)	(Royal Spanish Football Federation) UD Collerense

=== United States ===
Head coach: (Czech Republic) Jitka Klimková

On August 5, 2018, Hillary Beall withdrew injured and was replaced by Angelina Anderson.

No.	Pos.	Player	Date of birth (age)	Club
1	GK	Laurel Ivory	28 August 1999 (aged 18)	(United States Soccer Federation) Virginia Cavaliers
2	FW	Ashley Sanchez	16 March 1999 (aged 19)	(United States Soccer Federation) UCLA Bruins
3	DF	Tara McKeown	2 July 1999 (aged 19)	(United States Soccer Federation) USC Trojans
4	DF	Naomi Girma	14 June 2000 (aged 18)	(United States Soccer Federation) California Thorns FC
5	DF	Zoe Morse	1 April 1998 (aged 20)	(United States Soccer Federation) Virginia Cavaliers
6	FW	Penelope Hocking	29 December 1999 (aged 18)	(United States Soccer Federation) So Cal Blues
7	FW	Alexa Spaanstra	1 February 2000 (aged 18)	(United States Soccer Federation) Virginia Cavaliers
8	MF	Brianna Pinto	24 May 2000 (aged 18)	(United States Soccer Federation) NTH Tophat
9	FW	Sophia Smith	10 August 2000 (aged 17)	(United States Soccer Federation) Real Colorado
10	MF	Savannah DeMelo	26 March 1998 (aged 20)	(United States Soccer Federation) USC Trojans
11	MF	Viviana Villacorta	2 February 1999 (aged 19)	(United States Soccer Federation) UCLA Bruins
12	GK	Amanda McGlynn	2 November 1998 (aged 19)	(United States Soccer Federation) Virginia Tech Hokies
13	DF	Kiara Pickett	30 April 1999 (aged 19)	(United States Soccer Federation) Stanford Cardinal
14	DF	Isabel Rodríguez	13 April 1999 (aged 19)	(United States Soccer Federation) Ohio State Buckeyes
15	MF	Taryn Torres	23 April 1999 (aged 19)	(United States Soccer Federation) Virginia Cavaliers
16	DF	Samantha Hiatt	6 January 1998 (aged 20)	(United States Soccer Federation) Stanford Cardinal
17	FW	Abigail Kim	19 July 1998 (aged 20)	(United States Soccer Federation) California Golden Bears
18	MF	Jaelin Howell	21 November 1999 (aged 18)	(United States Soccer Federation) Real Colorado
19	FW	Erin Gilroy	21 January 1998 (aged 20)	(United States Soccer Federation) Tennessee Volunteers
20	DF	Emily Fox	5 July 1998 (aged 20)	(United States Soccer Federation) North Carolina Tar Heels
21	GK	Angelina Anderson	22 March 2001 (aged 17)	(United States Soccer Federation) Mustang ECNL

== Group D ==
=== China PR ===
Head Coach: (Denmark) Peter Bonde

No.	Pos.	Player	Date of birth (age)	Club
1	GK	Xu Huan	6 March 1999 (aged 19)	(Chinese Football Association) Beijing BG Phoenix F.C.
2	DF	Dou Jiaxing	29 February 2000 (aged 18)	(Chinese Football Association) Jiangsu Suning F.C.
3	DF	Li Yifan	27 September 1998 (aged 19)	(Chinese Football Association) SRCB
4	DF	Wang Linlin	4 August 2000 (aged 18)	(Chinese Football Association) SRCB
5	DF	Chen Qiaozhu	8 September 1999 (aged 18)	(Chinese Football Association) Meizhou Huijun
6	MF	Liu Jing	28 April 1998 (aged 20)	(Chinese Football Association) SRCB
7	FW	Wang Yanwen	27 March 1999 (aged 19)	(Chinese Football Association) Beijing BG Phoenix F.C.
8	MF	Shen Mengyu	19 August 2001 (aged 16)	(Chinese Football Association) SRCB
9	MF	Jin Kun	4 October 1999 (aged 18)	(Chinese Football Association) Jiangsu Suning F.C.
10	MF	Zhao Yujie	28 April 1999 (aged 19)	(United States Soccer Federation) Florida State Seminoles
11	MF	Xie Qiwen	27 May 1999 (aged 19)	(Chinese Football Association) Meizhou Huijun
12	GK	Liang Jiahui	28 July 2000 (aged 18)	(Chinese Football Association) Dalian Quanjian F.C.
13	DF	He Xing	27 April 1999 (aged 19)	(Chinese Football Association) Sichuan F.C.
14	DF	He Luyao	23 February 1999 (aged 19)	(Chinese Football Association) Shandong JingHua FC
15	MF	Ma Xiaolan	16 February 1999 (aged 19)	(Chinese Football Association) Beijing BG Phoenix F.C.
16	MF	Yan Yingying	28 January 1999 (aged 19)	(Chinese Football Association) SRCB
17	MF	Zhang Linyan	16 January 2001 (aged 17)	(Chinese Football Association) Evergrande Football School
18	MF	Yang Qian	5 January 2001 (aged 17)	(Chinese Football Association) SRCB
19	FW	Chen Yuanmeng	3 January 2000 (aged 18)	(Chinese Football Association) Dalian Quanjian F.C.
20	GK	Zheng Jie	18 December 1999 (aged 18)	(Chinese Football Association) SRCB
21	DF	Zhi Jie	22 March 1998 (aged 20)	(Chinese Football Association) Zhejiang W.F.C

=== Germany ===
Head Coach: Maren Meinert

No.	Pos.	Player	Date of birth (age)	Club
1	GK	Vanessa Fischer	18 April 1998 (aged 20)	(German Football Association) 1. FFC Turbine Potsdam
2	MF	Dina Orschmann	8 January 1998 (aged 20)	(German Football Association) 1. FFC Turbine Potsdam
3	DF	Katja Orschmann	8 January 1998 (aged 20)	(German Football Association) 1. FFC Turbine Potsdam
4	DF	Sophia Kleinherne	12 April 2000 (aged 18)	(German Football Association) 1. FFC Frankfurt
5	DF	Tanja Pawollek	18 January 1999 (aged 19)	(German Football Association) 1. FFC Frankfurt
6	MF	Janina Minge	11 June 1999 (aged 19)	(German Football Association) SC Freiburg
7	MF	Giulia Gwinn	2 July 1999 (aged 19)	(German Football Association) SC Freiburg
8	MF	Jana Feldkamp	15 March 1998 (aged 20)	(German Football Association) SGS Essen
9	FW	Stefanie Sanders	12 June 1998 (aged 20)	(United States Soccer Federation) UCF Knights
10	FW	Laura Freigang	1 February 1998 (aged 20)	(German Football Association) 1. FFC Frankfurt
11	MF	Kristin Kögel	21 September 1999 (aged 18)	(German Football Association) Bayern Munich
12	GK	Janina Leitzig	16 April 1999 (aged 19)	(German Football Association) TSG 1899 Hoffenheim
13	DF	Sarai Linder	26 October 1999 (aged 18)	(German Football Association) TSG 1899 Hoffenheim
14	DF	Janina Hechler	28 January 1999 (aged 19)	(German Football Association) 1. FFC Frankfurt
15	FW	Nina Lange	14 July 1998 (aged 20)	(German Football Association) MSV Duisburg
16	MF	Luca Graf	19 March 1999 (aged 19)	(German Football Association) 1. FFC Turbine Potsdam
17	MF	Sjoeke Nüsken	22 January 2001 (aged 17)	(German Football Association) Westfalia Rhynern
18	FW	Klara Bühl	7 December 2000 (aged 17)	(German Football Association) SC Freiburg
19	FW	Annalena Rieke	10 January 1999 (aged 19)	(German Football Association) SGS Essen
20	MF	Lena Oberdorf	19 December 2001 (aged 16)	(German Football Association) SGS Essen
21	GK	Charlotte Voll	22 April 1999 (aged 19)	(French Football Federation) Paris Saint-Germain

=== Haiti ===
Head Coach: (France) Marc Collat

No.	Pos.	Player	Date of birth (age)	Club
1	GK	Kerly Théus	7 January 1999 (aged 19)	Unattached
2	DF	Ruthny Mathurin	14 January 2001 (aged 17)	Unattached
3	DF	Napthalie Northe	21 January 1999 (aged 19)	Unattached
4	DF	Émeline Charles	27 October 1999 (aged 18)	Unattached
5	DF	Danielle Darius	3 March 1998 (aged 20)	Unattached
6	DF	Dougenie Joseph	13 September 2003 (aged 14)	Unattached
7	MF	Melissa Dacius	24 May 1999 (aged 19)	Unattached
8	MF	Nelourde Nicolas	26 July 1999 (aged 19)	Unattached
9	FW	Sherly Jeudy	13 October 1998 (aged 19)	Unattached
10	FW	Nérilia Mondésir	17 January 1999 (aged 19)	(French Football Federation) Montpellier HSC
11	FW	Roseline Éloissaint	20 February 1999 (aged 19)	Unattached
12	GK	Naphtaline Clermeus	1 August 1998 (aged 20)	Unattached
13	DF	Rosianne Jean	24 November 1999 (aged 18)	Unattached
14	MF	Rachelle Caremus	3 February 2003 (aged 15)	Unattached
15	MF	Danielle Étienne	16 January 2001 (aged 17)	Unattached
16	DF	Milan Pierre-Jerome	23 April 2002 (aged 16)	Unattached
17	FW	Mikerline Saint-Félix	18 November 1999 (aged 18)	Unattached
18	MF	Melchie Dumornay	17 August 2003 (aged 14)	Unattached
19	MF	Angeline Gustave	30 January 2001 (aged 17)	Unattached
20	MF	Dolores Jean-Thomas	16 May 1999 (aged 19)	Unattached
21	GK	Madelina Fleuriot	28 October 2003 (aged 14)	Unattached

=== Nigeria ===
Head Coach: Christopher Danjuma

No.	Pos.	Player	Date of birth (age)	Club
1	GK	Onyinyechukwu Okeke	17 August 1998 (aged 19)	(Nigeria Football Federation) Edo Queens
2	MF	Mary Saiki	8 April 2000 (aged 18)	(Nigeria Football Federation) Rivers Angels
3	DF	Glory Ogbonna	25 December 1998 (aged 19)	(Nigeria Football Federation) Ibom Angels
4	MF	Christy Ucheibe	25 December 2000 (aged 17)	(Nigeria Football Federation) Capital City Doves
5	DF	Gift Monday	9 December 2001 (aged 16)	(Nigeria Football Federation) Robo Queens
6	DF	Oluwakemi Famuditi	16 December 1998 (aged 19)	(Nigeria Football Federation) Confluence Queens
7	MF	Peace Efih	5 August 2000 (aged 18)	(Nigeria Football Federation) Edo Queens
8	FW	Rasheedat Ajibade	8 December 1999 (aged 18)	(Nigeria Football Federation) Robo Queens
9	DF	Joy Duru	23 December 1999 (aged 18)	(Nigeria Football Federation) Nasarawa Amazons
10	MF	Adebisi Saheed	18 July 2000 (aged 18)	(Nigeria Football Federation) Robo Queens
11	FW	Bashirat Amoo	6 June 2002 (aged 16)	(Nigeria Football Federation) Confluence Queens
12	MF	Grace Igboamalu	29 December 2001 (aged 16)	(Nigeria Football Federation) Nasarawa Amazons
13	DF	Mary Ologbosere	18 May 1999 (aged 19)	(Nigeria Football Federation) Ibom Angels
14	FW	Anam Imo	30 November 2000 (aged 17)	(Nigeria Football Federation) Nasarawa Amazons
15	DF	Opeyemi Sunday	12 July 1999 (aged 19)	(Nigeria Football Federation) Sunshine Queens
16	GK	Chiamaka Nnadozie	8 December 2000 (aged 17)	(Nigeria Football Federation) Rivers Angels
17	FW	Chidinma Okeke	11 August 2000 (aged 17)	(Nigeria Football Federation) Robo Queens
18	DF	Blessing Ezekiel	18 February 1999 (aged 19)	(Nigeria Football Federation) Rivers Angels
19	MF	Taibat Odueke	7 March 1999 (aged 19)	(Nigeria Football Federation) Edo Queens
20	FW	Aishat Bello	25 December 2000 (aged 17)	(Nigeria Football Federation) Nasarawa Amazons
21	GK	Rita Akarekor	13 February 2001 (aged 17)	(Nigeria Football Federation) Sunshine Queens
