= 2018 Sud Ladies Cup squads =

The 2018 Sud Ladies Cup was an international association football tournament held in Provence-Alpes-Côte d'Azur, France. The four national teams involved in the tournament were required to register a squad of 22 players; only players in these squads were eligible to take part in the tournament.

== France ==
Head coach: (France) Gilles Eyquem

No.	Pos.	Player	Date of birth (age)	Club
1	GK	Mylène Chavas	7 January 1998 (aged 20)	(France) AS Saint-Étienne
2	DF	Pauline Dechilly	7 April 1998 (aged 20)	(France) FC Metz
3	DF	Selma Bacha	9 November 2000 (aged 17)	(France) Olympique Lyon
4	DF	Julie Thibaud	20 April 1998 (aged 20)	(France) Girondins de Bordeaux
5	DF	Julie Piga	12 January 1998 (aged 20)	(France) Grenoble Foot 38
6	MF	Sana Daoudi	12 March 1998 (aged 20)	(Spain) Atlético Madrid
7	FW	Emelyne Laurent	4 November 1998 (aged 19)	(France) Olympique Lyon
8	MF	Christy Gavory	5 May 1998 (aged 20)	(France) FC Metz
9	FW	Marie-Antoinette Katoto	1 November 1998 (aged 19)	(France) Paris Saint-Germain
10	MF	Annahita Zamanian	19 February 1998 (aged 20)	(Sweden) Kopparbergs/Göteborg FC
11	FW	Amélie Delabre	26 November 2000 (aged 17)	(France) AS Saint-Étienne
12	DF	Léna Goetsch	7 October 1999 (aged 18)	(France) FC Vendenheim
13	DF	Élisa De Almeida	11 January 1998 (aged 20)	(France) Paris FC
14	DF	Maëlle Lakrar	27 May 2000 (aged 18)	(France) Olympique de Marseille
15	MF	Léa Khelifi	12 May 1999 (aged 19)	(France) FC Metz
16	GK	Camille Pecharman	7 October 1998 (aged 19)	(France) Paris FC
17	MF	Carla Polito	13 January 2000 (aged 18)	(France) Arras FCF
18	FW	Océane Ringenbach	7 November 1998 (aged 19)	(France) US Saint-Malo
19	FW	Marion Rey	21 March 1999 (aged 19)	(Switzerland) FC Basel
20	FW	Kelly Gago	5 January 1999 (aged 19)	(France) AS Saint-Étienne

== Germany ==
Head coach: (Germany) Maren Meinert

No.	Pos.	Player	Date of birth (age)	Club
1	GK	Vanessa Fischer	18 April 1998 (aged 20)	(Germany) 1. FFC Turbine Potsdam
2	MF	Dina Orschmann	8 January 1998 (aged 20)	(United States) UCF Knights
3	DF	Katja Orschmann	8 January 1998 (aged 20)	(Germany) 1. FFC Turbine Potsdam
4	DF	Sophia Kleinherne	12 April 2000 (aged 18)	(Germany) 1. FFC Frankfurt
5	DF	Tanja Pawollek	18 January 1999 (aged 19)	(Germany) 1. FFC Frankfurt
6	MF	Janina Minge	11 June 1999 (aged 18)	(Germany) SC Freiburg
7	MF	Nina Lange	14 July 1998 (aged 19)	(Germany) Arminia Bielefeld
8	MF	Jana Feldkamp	15 March 1998 (aged 20)	(Germany) SGS Essen
9	FW	Stefanie Sanders	12 June 1998 (aged 19)	(United States) UCF Knights
10	FW	Laura Freigang	1 February 1998 (aged 20)	(United States) Penn State Nittany Lions
11	MF	Kristin Kögel	21 September 1999 (aged 18)	(Germany) FC Bayern Munich
12	GK	Janina Leitzig	16 April 1999 (aged 19)	(Germany) TSG 1899 Hoffenheim
13	DF	Sarai Linder	26 October 1999 (aged 18)	(Germany) TSG 1899 Hoffenheim
14	MF	Janina Hechler	28 January 1999 (aged 19)	(Germany) 1. FFC Frankfurt
15	DF	Lisa Schöppl	11 January 2000 (aged 18)	(Germany) VfL Wolfsburg
16	MF	Luca Maria Graf	19 March 1999 (aged 19)	(Germany) FF USV Jena
17	MF	Anna Weiß	21 July 1998 (aged 19)	(Germany) FF USV Jena
18	FW	Klara Bühl	7 December 2000 (aged 17)	(Germany) SC Freiburg
19	FW	Annalena Rieke	10 January 1999 (aged 19)	(Germany) FF USV Jena
20	FW	Erëleta Memeti^{[1]}	30 June 1999 (aged 18)	(Germany) VfL Wolfsburg
21	GK	Lena Pauels	2 February 1998 (aged 20)	(Germany) SV Werder Bremen
22	DF	Annalena Breitenbach	14 March 1998 (aged 20)	(Germany) FF USV Jena

^{1} Capped for Kosovo

== Haiti ==
Head coach: (France) Marc Collat

No.	Pos.	Player	Date of birth (age)	Club
1	GK	Kerly Théus	7 January 1999 (aged 19)	(Haiti) Aigle Brillant FC
2	DF	Taina Gervais	8 November 1999 (aged 18)	(Haiti) AS Tigresses
3	DF	Napthalie Northé	21 January 1999 (aged 19)	(Haiti) AS Tigresses
4	DF	Émeline Charles	27 October 1999 (aged 18)	(Haiti) Aigle Brillant FC
5	DF	Nandie Deshommes	29 January 2000 (aged 18)	(Haiti) Aigle Brillant FC
6	DF	Yverline Serviné	1 January 1999 (aged 19)	(Haiti) Anacaona SC
7	MF	Melissa Dacius	24 May 1999 (aged 19)	(Haiti) AS Tigresses
8	FW	Nelourde Nicolas	26 July 1999 (aged 18)	(Haiti) Anacaona SC
9	MF	Sherly Jeudy	13 October 1998 (aged 19)	(Haiti) Anacaona SC
10	FW	Nérilia Mondésir	17 January 1999 (aged 19)	(France) Montpellier HSC
11	FW	Roseline Éloissaint	20 February 1999 (aged 19)	(Haiti) AS Tigresses
12	GK	Naphtaline Clerméus	1 August 1998 (aged 19)	(Haiti) AS Tigresses
13	DF	Rosianne Jean	24 November 1999 (aged 18)	(Haiti) AS Tigresses
14	MF	Dolorès Jean Thomas	16 May 1999 (aged 19)	(Haiti) AS Tigresses
16	MF	Wagnelda Milien	4 December 2000 (aged 17)	(Haiti) Valentina FC
17	FW	Mikerline Saint-Félix	18 November 1999 (aged 18)	(Haiti) Valentina FC
18	MF	Noémie Ferron	2 March 1999 (aged 19)	(Canada) FC Saint-Eustache
19	FW	Yamilee Eveillard	16 September 1999 (aged 18)	(United States) Connecticut Huskies
20	DF	Zunia Désius	14 November 2001 (aged 16)	(France) AAS Sarcelles
23	GK	Edjenie Joseph	20 April 2001 (aged 17)	(Haiti) ASF Croix-des-Bouquets

== United States ==
Head coach: (Czech Republic) Jitka Klimková

No.	Pos.	Player	Date of birth (age)	Club
1	GK	Laurel Ivory	28 August 1999 (aged 18)	(United States) Virginia Cavaliers
2	DF	Kiki Pickett	30 April 1999 (aged 19)	(United States) Stanford Cardinal
3	DF	Izzy Rodriguez	13 April 1999 (aged 19)	(United States) Ohio State Buckeyes
4	FW	Taryn Torres	23 April 1999 (aged 19)	(United States) Virginia Cavaliers
5	DF	Zoe Morse	1 April 1998 (aged 20)	(United States) Virginia Cavaliers
6	FW	Erin Gilroy	21 January 1998 (aged 20)	(United States) Tennessee Volunteers
7	MF	Savannah DeMelo	26 March 1998 (aged 20)	(United States) USC Trojans
8	MF	Brianna Pinto	24 May 2000 (aged 18)	(United States) NTH Tophat
9	FW	Sophia Smith	10 August 2000 (aged 17)	(United States) Real Colorado
10	MF	Viviana Villacorta	2 February 1999 (aged 19)	(United States) UCLA Bruins
11	MF	Delanie Sheehan	13 January 1999 (aged 19)	(United States) UCLA Bruins
12	GK	Hillary Beall	27 January 1999 (aged 19)	(United States) Michigan Wolverines
13	DF	Tara McKeown	2 July 1999 (aged 18)	(United States) USC Trojans
14	DF	Sam Hiatt	6 January 1998 (aged 20)	(United States) Stanford Cardinal
15	DF	Natalie Winters	7 May 1998 (aged 20)	(United States) Iowa Hawkeyes
16	DF	Karina Rodríguez^{[a]}	2 March 1999 (aged 19)	(United States) UCLA Bruins
17	FW	Abi Kim	19 July 1998 (aged 19)	(United States) California Golden Bears
18	MF	Jaelin Howell	21 November 1999 (aged 18)	(United States) Real Colorado
19	FW	Penelope Hocking	29 December 1999 (aged 18)	(United States) So Cal Blues
20	FW	Ashley Sanchez	16 March 1999 (aged 19)	(United States) UCLA Bruins
21	FW	Alexa Spaanstra	1 February 2000 (aged 18)	(United States) Virginia Cavaliers
23	DF	Naomi Girma	14 June 2000 (aged 17)	(United States) California Thorns

^{a} Capped for Mexico
