= 2017 UEFA Women's Under-19 Championship =

Tournament details
- Host country: Northern Ireland
- Dates: 8–20 August
- Teams: 8 (from 1 confederation)
- Venue: 4 (in 4 host cities)

Final positions
- Champions: Spain (2nd title)
- Runners-up: France

Tournament statistics
- Matches played: 16
- Goals scored: 52 (3.25 per match)
- Attendance: 18,438 (1,152 per match)
- Top scorer: (Spain) Patricia Guijarro (5 goals)
- Best player: (Spain) Patricia Guijarro

The 2017 UEFA Women's Under-19 Championship (also known as UEFA Women's Under-19 Euro 2017) was the 16th edition of the UEFA Women's Under-19 Championship (20th edition if the Under-18 era is included), the annual international youth football championship organised by UEFA for the women's under-19 national teams of Europe. Northern Ireland was selected by UEFA on 26 January 2015 as the host country for the tournament.

A total of eight teams played in the tournament, with players born on or after 1 January 1998 eligible to participate.

Same as previous editions held in odd-numbered years, the tournament acts as the UEFA qualifiers for the FIFA U-20 Women's World Cup. The top four teams of the tournament qualified for the 2018 FIFA U-20 Women's World Cup in France as the UEFA representatives, besides France who qualified automatically as hosts.

== Qualification ==
A total of 48 UEFA nations entered the competition, and with the hosts Northern Ireland qualifying automatically, the other 47 teams competed in the qualifying competition to determine the remaining seven spots in the final tournament. The qualifying competition consisted of two rounds: Qualifying round, which took place in autumn 2016, and Elite round, which took place in spring 2017.

=== Qualified teams ===
The following eight teams qualified for the final tournament.

Note: All appearance statistics include only U-19 era (since 2002).

| Team | Method of qualification | Finals appearance | Last appearance | Previous best performance |
|---|---|---|---|---|
| Northern Ireland | Hosts | 1st | — | Debut |
| Spain | Elite round Group 1 winners | 12th | 2016 | Champions (2004) |
| England | Elite round Group 2 winners | 12th | 2015 | Champions (2009) |
| Netherlands | Elite round Group 3 winners | 7th | 2016 | Champions (2014) |
| France | Elite round Group 3 runners-up | 13th | 2016 | Champions (2003, 2010, 2013, 2016) |
| Scotland | Elite round Group 4 winners | 5th | 2014 | Group stage (2005, 2008, 2010, 2014) |
| Italy | Elite round Group 5 winners | 6th | 2011 | Champions (2008) |
| Germany | Elite round Group 6 winners | 14th | 2016 | Champions (2002, 2006, 2007, 2011) |

Notes

1. The best runners-up among all six elite round groups qualified for the final tournament.

=== Final draw ===
The final draw was held on 22 June 2017, 15:00 BST (UTC+1), at the Belfast City Hall in Belfast, Northern Ireland. The eight teams were drawn into two groups of four teams. There was no seeding, except that hosts Northern Ireland were assigned to position A1 in the draw.

== Venues ==
The tournament was hosted in four venues:

| Belfast | 2017 UEFA Women's Under-19 Championship is located in Northern Ireland | Lurgan |
|---|---|---|
| Windsor Park | 2017 UEFA Women's Under-19 Championship is located in Northern Ireland | Mourneview Park |
| Capacity: 18,434 | 2017 UEFA Women's Under-19 Championship is located in Northern Ireland | Capacity: 4,160 |
| 4 group matches, 2 semi-finals, final | 2017 UEFA Women's Under-19 Championship is located in Northern Ireland | 3 group matches |
| Portadown | 2017 UEFA Women's Under-19 Championship is located in Northern Ireland | Ballymena |
| Shamrock Park | 2017 UEFA Women's Under-19 Championship is located in Northern Ireland | Ballymena Showgrounds |
| Capacity: 2,770 | 2017 UEFA Women's Under-19 Championship is located in Northern Ireland | Capacity: 3,600 |
| 2 group matches | 2017 UEFA Women's Under-19 Championship is located in Northern Ireland | 3 group matches, third-place playoff |

== Squads ==
Each national team have to submit a squad of 18 players.

== Match officials ==
A total of 6 referees, 8 assistant referees and 2 fourth officials were appointed for the final tournament.

Referees

- Barbara Poxhofer (Austria)
- Volha Tsiareshka (Belarus)
- Justina Lavrenovaitė (Lithuania)
- Marte Sørø (Norway)
- Silvia Domingos (Portugal)
- Petra Pavlikova (Slovakia)

Assistant referees

- Bérengère Pierart (Belgium)
- Gabriela Hanáková (Czech Republic)
- Nina Hammarberg (Finland)
- (North Macedonia) Elena Soklevska-Ilievski (Macedonia)
- Iuliia Petrova (Russia)
- Vikki Robertson (Scotland)
- Ivana Lesková (Slovakia)
- Staša Špur (Slovenia)

Fourth officials

- Rebecca Welch (England)
- Cheryl Foster (Wales)

== Group stage ==
The final tournament schedule was confirmed on 22 June 2017.

The group winners and runners-up advance to the semi-finals and qualify for the 2018 FIFA U-20 Women's World Cup.

Tiebreakers

The teams are ranked according to points (3 points for a win, 1 point for a draw, 0 points for a loss). If two or more teams are equal on points on completion of the group matches, the following tie-breaking criteria are applied, in the order given, to determine the rankings (Regulations Articles 17.01 and 17.02):

1. Higher number of points obtained in the group matches played among the teams in question;
2. Superior goal difference resulting from the group matches played among the teams in question;
3. Higher number of goals scored in the group matches played among the teams in question;
4. If, after having applied criteria 1 to 3, teams still have an equal ranking, criteria 1 to 3 are reapplied exclusively to the group matches between the teams in question to determine their final rankings. If this procedure does not lead to a decision, criteria 5 to 9 apply;
5. Superior goal difference in all group matches;
6. Higher number of goals scored in all group matches;
7. If only two teams have the same number of points, and they are tied according to criteria 1 to 6 after having met in the last round of the group stage, their rankings are determined by a penalty shoot-out (not used if more than two teams have the same number of points, or if their rankings are not relevant for qualification for the next stage).
8. Lower disciplinary points total based only on yellow and red cards received in the group matches (red card = 3 points, yellow card = 1 point, expulsion for two yellow cards in one match = 3 points);
9. Higher position in the coefficient ranking list used for the qualifying round draw;
10. Drawing of lots.

All times are local, BST (UTC+1).

=== Group A ===
| Pos | Team | Pld | W | D | L | GF | GA | GD | Pts | Qualification |
|---|---|---|---|---|---|---|---|---|---|---|
| 1 | Germany | 3 | 3 | 0 | 0 | 11 | 0 | +11 | 9 | Knockout stage and 2018 FIFA U-20 Women's World Cup |
| 2 | Spain | 3 | 2 | 0 | 1 | 3 | 2 | +1 | 6 | Knockout stage and 2018 FIFA U-20 Women's World Cup |
| 3 | Scotland | 3 | 0 | 1 | 2 | 1 | 5 | −4 | 1 | FIFA U-20 Women's World Cup play-off (Note: Because France are among the semi-finalists, the two third-placed teams of the group stage enter the FIFA U-20 Women's World Cup play-off where the winner qualifies for the 2018 FIFA U-20 Women's World Cup.) |
| 4 | Northern Ireland | 3 | 0 | 1 | 2 | 1 | 9 | −8 | 1 | |

Source: UEFA
Rules for classification: Group stage tiebreakers
Notes:
8 August 2017
15:00

| Scotland | 0–3 | Germany |
|---|---|---|
| | Report | Gwinn 19'; Rieke 39'; Memeti 80' |

Windsor Park, Belfast
Attendance: 599
Referee: Volha Tsiareshka (Belarus)
8 August 2017
19:00

| Northern Ireland | 0–2 | Spain |
|---|---|---|
| | Report | García 30'; Guijarro 53' |

Windsor Park, Belfast
Attendance: 4,289
Referee: Justina Lavrenovaitė (Lithuania)

11 August 2017
15:00

| Germany | 2–0 | Spain |
|---|---|---|
| Graf 25'; Orschmann 66' | Report |

Shamrock Park, Portadown
Attendance: 658
Referee: Barbara Poxhofer (Austria)
11 August 2017
19:00

| Northern Ireland | 1–1 | Scotland |
|---|---|---|
| McDaniel 85' | Report | Hanson 46' |

Mourneview Park, Lurgan
Attendance: 2,959
Referee: Marte Sørø (Norway)

14 August 2017
19:00

| Germany | 6–0 | Northern Ireland |
|---|---|---|
| Bühl 6', 25'; Rieke 28'; Kögel 58'; Siems 62'; Gerhardt 86' | Report |

Ballymena Showgrounds, Ballymena
Attendance: 1,783
Referee: Silvia Domingos (Portugal)
14 August 2017
19:00

| Spain | 1–0 | Scotland |
|---|---|---|
| Guijarro 55' | Report |

Mourneview Park, Lurgan
Attendance: 358
Referee: Petra Pavlikova (Slovakia)

=== Group B ===
| Pos | Team | Pld | W | D | L | GF | GA | GD | Pts | Qualification |
|---|---|---|---|---|---|---|---|---|---|---|
| 1 | Netherlands | 3 | 2 | 1 | 0 | 7 | 3 | +4 | 7 | Knockout stage and 2018 FIFA U-20 Women's World Cup |
| 2 | France | 3 | 2 | 0 | 1 | 7 | 3 | +4 | 6 | Knockout stage and 2018 FIFA U-20 Women's World Cup |
| 3 | England | 3 | 1 | 0 | 2 | 2 | 4 | −2 | 3 | FIFA U-20 Women's World Cup play-off (Note: Because France are among the semi-finalists, the two third-placed teams of the group stage enter the FIFA U-20 Women's World Cup play-off where the winner qualifies for the 2018 FIFA U-20 Women's World Cup.) |
| 4 | Italy | 3 | 0 | 1 | 2 | 5 | 11 | −6 | 1 | |

Source: UEFA
Rules for classification: Group stage tiebreakers
Notes:
8 August 2017
15:00

| Italy | 1–2 | England |
|---|---|---|
| Serturini 90+1' | Report | Allen 52', 76' |

Mourneview Park, Lurgan
Attendance: 574
Referee: Marte Sørø (Norway)
8 August 2017
15:00

| France | 0–2 | Netherlands |
|---|---|---|
| | Report | Pelova 10'; Piga 22' (o.g.) |

Ballymena Showgrounds, Ballymena
Attendance: 438
Referee: Petra Pavlikova (Slovakia)

11 August 2017
15:00

| Italy | 1–6 | France |
|---|---|---|
| Serturini 9' | Report | Kradjov 35'; Bourdieu 38', 58'; Ollivier 69'; Laurent 72'; Gavory 90+2' |

Windsor Park, Belfast
Attendance: 483
Referee: Volha Tsiareshka (Belarus)
11 August 2017
19:00

| Netherlands | 2–0 | England |
|---|---|---|
| Nouwen 11'; Smits 45+3' | Report |

Windsor Park, Belfast
Attendance: 769
Referee: Silvia Domingos (Portugal)

14 August 2017
15:00

| Netherlands | 3–3 | Italy |
|---|---|---|
| Kalma 25'; Nouwen 34' (pen.); Weerden 90+4' | Report | Nouwen 7' (o.g.); Regazzoli 66'; Serturini 83' |

Shamrock Park, Portadown
Attendance: 351
Referee: Barbara Poxhofer (Austria)
14 August 2017
15:00

| England | 0–1 | France |
|---|---|---|
| | Report | Boussaha 88' |

Ballymena Showgrounds, Ballymena
Attendance: 519
Referee: Justina Lavrenovaitė (Lithuania)

== Knockout stage ==
In the knockout stage, extra time and penalty shoot-out are used to decide the winner if necessary.

On 2 May 2016, the UEFA Executive Committee agreed that the competition would be part of the International Football Association Board (IFAB)'s trial to allow a fourth substitute to be made during extra time. On 1 June 2017, it was also announced as part of a trial sanctioned by the IFAB to reduce the advantage of the team shooting first in a penalty shoot-out, a different sequence of taking penalties, known as "ABBA", that mirrors the serving sequence in a tennis tiebreak would be used if a penalty shoot-out was needed (team A kicks first, team B kicks second):

Original sequence
AB AB AB AB AB (sudden death starts) AB AB etc.
Trial sequence
AB BA AB BA AB (sudden death starts) BA AB etc.

=== Bracket ===
Semi-finals
17 August – Belfast
Germany | 1
France | 2
17 August – Belfast
Netherlands | 2
Spain | 3

Final
20 August – Belfast
France | 2
Spain | 3
World Cup play-off
17 August – Lurgan
Scotland | 0
England | 2

=== FIFA U-20 Women's World Cup play-off ===
Winner qualifies for 2018 FIFA U-20 Women's World Cup.

17 August 2017
19:00

| Scotland | 0–2 | England |
|---|---|---|
| | Report | Cross 28'; Rouse 50' |

Mourneview Park, Lurgan
Attendance: 107
Referee: Petra Pavlikova (Slovakia)

=== Semi-finals ===
17 August 2017
15:00

| Netherlands | 2–3 | Spain |
|---|---|---|
| Pelova 48'; Smits 85' | Report | García 47'; Oroz 68'; Guijarro 77' |

Windsor Park, Belfast
Attendance: 510
Referee: Justina Lavrenovaitė (Lithuania)

17 August 2017
19:00

| Germany | 1–2 | France |
|---|---|---|
| Bühl 40' | Report | Thibaud 70'; Laurent 73' |

Windsor Park, Belfast
Attendance: 924
Referee: Silvia Domingos (Portugal)

=== Final ===
20 August 2017
19:30

| France | 2–3 | Spain |
|---|---|---|
| Bourdieu 4'; Laurent 71' | Report | Guijarro 18', 90'; Egurrola 85' |

Windsor Park, Belfast
Attendance: 3,117
Referee: Volha Tsiareshka (Belarus)

== Goalscorers ==
Note: Goals scored in the FIFA U-20 Women's World Cup play-off are included in this list, but are not counted by UEFA for statistical purposes.

5 goals

- (Spain) Patricia Guijarro

3 goals

- (France) Mathilde Bourdieu
- (France) Emelyne Laurent
- (Germany) Klara Bühl
- (Italy) Annamaria Serturini

2 goals

- (England) Georgia Allen
- (Germany) Annalena Rieke
- (Netherlands) Aniek Nouwen
- (Netherlands) Victoria Pelova
- (Netherlands) Joëlle Smits
- (Spain) Lucía García

1 goal

- (England) Zoe Cross (in play-off)
- (England) Mollie Rouse (in play-off)
- (France) Lina Boussaha
- (France) Christy Gavory
- (France) Catherine Karadjov
- (France) Agathe Ollivier
- (France) Julie Thibaud
- (Germany) Anna Gerhardt
- (Germany) Luca Maria Graf
- (Germany) Giulia Gwinn
- (Germany) Kristin Kögel
- (Germany) Ereleta Memeti
- (Germany) Dina Orschmann
- (Germany) Caroline Siems
- (Italy) Alice Regazzoli
- (Netherlands) Fenna Kalma
- (Netherlands) Ashleigh Weerden
- (Northern Ireland) Louise McDaniel
- (Scotland) Kirsty Hanson
- (Spain) Damaris Egurrola
- (Spain) Maite Oroz

1 own goal

- (France) Julie Piga (against Netherlands)
- (Netherlands) Aniek Nouwen (against Italy)

Source: UEFA.com

== Team of the Tournament ==
Goalkeepers

- (England) Sandy MacIver
- (France) Mylène Chavas
- (Netherlands) Lize Kop

Defenders

- (Germany) Dina Orschmann
- (Germany) Caroline Siems
- (Spain) Ona Batlle
- (Spain) Carmen Menayo
- (Spain) Lucía Rodríguez

Midfielders

- (France) Sana Daoudi
- (Germany) Janina Minge
- (Netherlands) Victoria Pelova
- (Spain) Damaris Egurrola
- (Spain) Patricia Guijarro
- (Spain) Maite Oroz

Forwards

- (France) Mathilde Bourdieu
- (France) Emelyne Laurent
- (Germany) Klara Bühl
- (Germany) Laura Freigang

Source: UEFA Technical Report

== Qualified teams for FIFA U-20 Women's World Cup ==
The following five teams from UEFA qualified for the 2018 FIFA U-20 Women's World Cup, including France which qualified as hosts.

| Team | Qualified on | Previous appearances in FIFA U-20 Women's World Cup^{1} |
|---|---|---|
| France | 19 March 2015 | 6 (2002, 2006, 2008, 2010, 2014, 2016) |
| Spain | 14 August 2017 | 2 (2004, 2016) |
| Germany | 11 August 2017 | 8 (2002, **2004**, 2006, 2008, **2010**, 2012, **2014**, 2016) |
| Netherlands | 11 August 2017 | 0 (debut) |
| England | 17 August 2017 | 4 (2002, 2008, 2010, 2014) |

^{1} Bold indicates champions for that year. Italic indicates hosts for that year.
