= Northern Ireland women's national under-19 football team =

National U-19 association football team

Northern Ireland
- Association: Irish Football Association
- Confederation: UEFA (Europe)
- Head coach: Gail Redmond
- FIFA code: NIR
First colours	Second colours

Biggest win
- Northern Ireland 8–0 Georgia; Tammela, Finland (13 September 2014)

Biggest defeat
- Italy 10–1 Northern Ireland; Pontedera, Italy (26 November 2025)

European Championship
- Appearances: 1 (first in 2017)

The Northern Ireland women's national under-19 football team represents the female under-19s of Northern Ireland in the UEFA Women's Under-19 Championship, and is controlled by the Irish Football Association.

== History ==
=== UEFA Women's Under-19 Championship ===
The Northern Irish team has qualified once for the UEFA Women's Under-19 Championship when hosting in 2017.

Year	Result	Matches	Wins	Draws	Losses	GF	GA	Squad
Two-legged final 1998	did not Qualify							
(Sweden) 1999	did not Qualify							
(France) 2000	did not Qualify							
(Norway) 2001	did not Qualify							
(Sweden) 2002	did not Qualify							
(Germany) 2003	did not Qualify							
(Finland) 2004	did not Qualify							
(Hungary) 2005	did not Qualify							
(Switzerland) 2006	did not Qualify							
(Iceland) 2007	did not Qualify							
(France) 2008	did not Qualify							
(Belarus) 2009	did not Qualify							
(North Macedonia) 2010	did not Qualify							
(Italy) 2011	did not Qualify							
(Turkey) 2012	did not Qualify							
(Wales) 2013	did not Qualify							
(Norway) 2014	did not Qualify							
(Israel) 2015	did not Qualify							
(Slovakia) 2016	did not Qualify							
(Northern Ireland) 2017	Group Stage	3	0	1	2	1	9	Squad
(Switzerland) 2018	did not Qualify							
(Scotland) 2019	did not Qualify							
(Georgia (country)) ~~2020~~	Cancelled due to the COVID-19 pandemic							
(Belarus) ~~2021~~	Cancelled due to the COVID-19 pandemic							
(Czech Republic) 2022	did not qualify							
(Belgium) 2023	did not qualify							
(Lithuania) 2024	did not qualify							
(Poland) 2025	did not qualify							
(Bosnia and Herzegovina) 2026	did not qualify							
(Hungary) 2027	TBD							
Total	1/26	3	0	1	2	1	9	

The following is a list of match results in the last 12 months, as well as any future matches that have been scheduled.

Legend

Win Draw Lose Fixture

=== 2025 ===
26 November 2026 UEFA European Under-19 Championship qualification	Italy	10–1	Northern Ireland	Pontedera, Italy
14:00 GMT (15:00 local time)	Ventriglia 3', 53', 81'; Galli 8', 56'; Ferraresi 45+3'; Venturelli 48', 83'; Taddei 73', 90+3'	Report	Consolini 61' (o.g.)	Stadium: Stadio Ettore Mannucci

29 November 2026 UEFA European Under-19 Championship qualification	Switzerland	2–1	Northern Ireland	Pontedera, Italy
10:30 GMT (11:30 local time)	Vonnez 56'; Hinder 90+5'	Report	McGuinness 84'	Stadium: Stadio Ettore Mannucci

2 December 2026 UEFA European Under-19 Championship qualification	Northern Ireland	3–2	Belarus	Florence, Italy
14:00 GMT (15:00 local time)	Hadzinskaya 26' (o.g.); McNeill 48'; Conway 90+8'	Report	Hampton 59' (o.g.); Marchuk 83'	Stadium: Davide Astori - Viola Park

=== 2026 ===
12 April 2026 UEFA European Under-19 Championship qualification	Northern Ireland	0–1	Portugal	Oeiras, Portugal
18:00 GMT		Report	Valente 37' (pen.)	Stadium: Cidade do Futebol; Referee: Olivia Tschon (Austria)

15 April 2026 UEFA European Under-19 Championship qualification	Spain	3–0	Northern Ireland	Oeiras, Portugal
12:00 GMT	Ainoa Gómez 27'; Irune Dorado 32'; Boyd 39' (o.g.)	Report		Stadium: Estádio Nacional; Referee: Ana Maria Terteleac (Romania)

18 April 2026 UEFA European Under-19 Championship qualification	Hungary	1–1	Northern Ireland	Oeiras, Portugal
18:00 GMT	Hanász 53'	Report	Breen 67'	Stadium: Estádio Nacional; Referee: Alexandra Collin (France)

== Current squad ==
The following players were named to the squad to take part in the 2026 UEFA European Under-19 Championship Qualifiers for the games against Pirtugal, Spain & Hungary in April 2026.

Head coach: Gail Redmond

No.	Pos.	Player	Date of birth (age)	Club
1	GK	Kate Smith	10 May 2007 (age 19)	(Irish Football Association) Lisburn Rangers
12	GK	Lily Jeffery	19 October 2008 (age 18)	(Irish Football Association) Glentoran
2	DF	Zara Boyd	29 September 2007 (age 19)	(Football Australia) Gold Coast Knights
4	DF	Ellen Hampton	5 April 2007 (age 19)	(United States Soccer Federation) Arkansas Red Wolves
5	DF	Anastasija Stanite	11 September 2007 (age 19)	(Irish Football Association) Craigavon City
14	DF	Lillie Horner	10 August 2008 (age 18)	(Irish Football Association) Crusaders Strikers
16	DF	Tara Kerr	14 March 2008 (age 18)	(Irish Football Association) Linfield
17	DF	Daisy Conway	26 January 2007 (age 19)	(Irish Football Association) Glentoran
3	MF	Zoe Knox	15 February 2007 (age 19)	(Irish Football Association) Linfield
6	MF	Emily Cassap	11 May 2007 (age 19)	(The Football Association) Sunderland
7	MF	Darcie McNeill	17 July 2007 (age 19)	(Irish Football Association) Crusaders Strikers
18	MF	Lydia Thompson	18 April 2008 (age 18)	(Irish Football Association) Cliftonville
19	MF	Jessica McGuinness	7 April 2008 (age 18)	(Irish Football Association) Crusaders Strikers
20	MF	Niamh Hassan	23 July 2008 (age 18)	(Irish Football Association) Crusaders Strikers
8	FW	Clodagh Maguire	5 January 2007 (age 19)	(Irish Football Association) Glentoran
9	FW	Gracie Conway	26 January 2007 (age 19)	(Irish Football Association) Glentoran
10	FW	Niamh Boothroyd	20 May 2007 (age 19)	(The Football Association) Sunderland
11	FW	Rhianna Breen	28 September 2007 (age 19)	(Irish Football Association) Linfield
13	FW	Lucy Kelly	18 May 2008 (age 18)	(Irish Football Association) Cliftonville
15	FW	Mia Reilly	16 December 2008 (age 17)	(Irish Football Association) Crusaders Strikers

Note: Names in italics denote players that have been capped for the senior team.

== See also ==
- Northern Ireland women's national football team
- Northern Ireland women's national under-17 football team
