= Cinta Rodríguez =

Spanish footballer (born 1999)

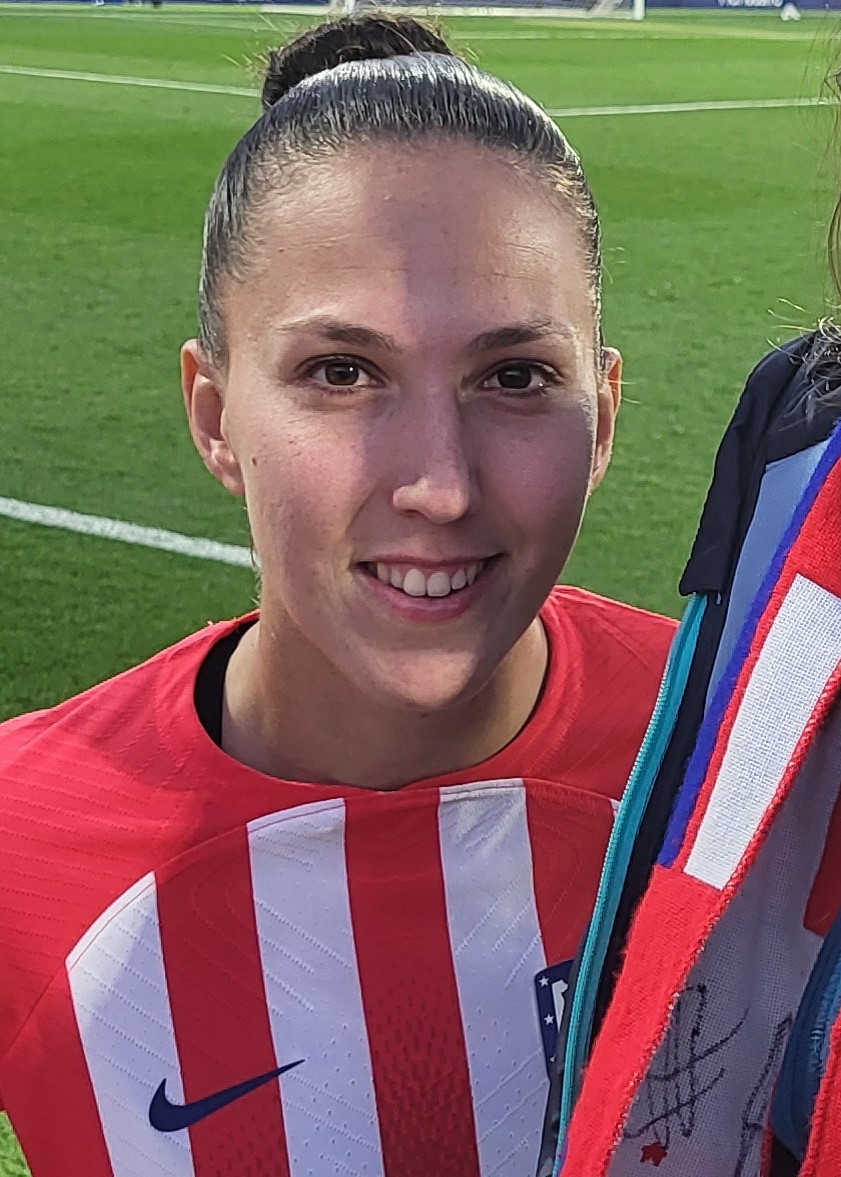
- Rodríguez with Atlético Madrid in 2024

Personal information
- Full name: Cinta Del Mar Rodríguez Costa
- Date of birth: 7 November 1999 (age 26)
- Place of birth: Huelva, Spain
- Height: 1.76 m (5 ft 9 in)
- Position: Defender

Team information
- Current team: UD Tenerife
- Number: 3

Youth career
- Sporting de Huelva

Senior career*
| Years | Team | Apps | (Gls) |
| 2016–2022 | Sporting de Huelva | 131 | (1) |
| 2022–2024 | Atlético Madrid | 43 | (1) |
| 2024– | UD Tenerife | 33 | (0) |
- * Club domestic league appearances and goals as of 02:06, 23 December 2025 (UTC)

Cinta Rodríguez (born 7 November 1999) is a Spanish footballer who plays as a defender for Liga F club UD Tenerife.

== Club career ==
Cinta Rodríguez began her football career at Sporting de Huelva where she made her debut in Liga F on 24 April 2016 with a 3–1 victory over Rayo Vallecano, coming on a substitute for Elena Pavel.

On July 1, 2022, Rodríguez signed for Atlético de Madrid.

She made her debut on 17 September 2022 against Sevilla with a 3–1 win. In Cinta Rodríguez first season she won the Copa de la Reina de Fútbol against Real Madrid winning a via penalty shootout.

== International career ==
Rodríguez represented Spain at U-19 twice helping Spain win the 2017 UEFA Women's Under-19 Championship.

== Honours ==
- Copa de la Reina de Fútbol: 2022–23
- UEFA Women's Under-19 Championship: 2017
