= Kerrie McCarthy =

Ghanaian footballer

Personal information
- Place of birth: Kumasi, Ghana
- Position: Goalkeeper

Team information
- Current team: Kumasi Sports Academy Ladies F. C
- Number: 22

Senior career*
Years	Team	Apps	(Gls)
- Kumasi Sports Academy Ladies F. C

International career
- Ghana U17
- Ghana U20
- * Club domestic league appearances and goals

Kerrie McCarthy (born 22 October 2000) is a Ghanaian footballer who plays as a goalkeeper.

== Career ==
McCarthy plays for Kumasi Sports Academy Ladies football club. She is 159 cm tall and playing for the Black Princesses prefers to play with her right foot. Her jersey number is 16. In 2018, she played in the U20 Women's World Cup.
