= Zoe Aguirre =

Mexican footballer (born 2000)

Personal information
- Full name: Zoe Ree Aguirre Fitzgerald
- Date of birth: 3 October 2000 (age 26)
- Place of birth: California, United States
- Height: 1.75 m (5 ft 9 in)
- Position: Goalkeeper

College career
Years	Team	Apps	(Gls)
2018–2019	Eastern Kentucky Colonels	10	(0)
2020	San Jose State Spartans		

Senior career*
Years	Team	Apps	(Gls)
2021	América	0	(0)
2022	Juárez	9	(0)
2023	Boyacá Chicó F.C.	8	(0)
2023	León	0	(0)
2025–2026	Guadalajara	1	(0)

International career^{‡}
2018–2020	Mexico U-20	0	(0)
- * Club domestic league appearances and goals as of 31 January 2026 ‡ National team caps and goals as of 29 February 2024

Zoe Ree Aguirre Fitzgerald (born 23 October 2000) is a professional footballer who plays as a goalkeeper. Born and raised in the United States, she represents Mexico internationally.

== Club career ==
In 2021, she started her career in América. In 2022, she was transferred to Juárez. In 2023, she joined Boyacá Chicó F.C. and the next season she joined León.

== International career ==
Aguirre represented Mexico at one FIFA U-20 Women's World Cup edition (2018).
