= Annalena Breitenbach =

German association football player

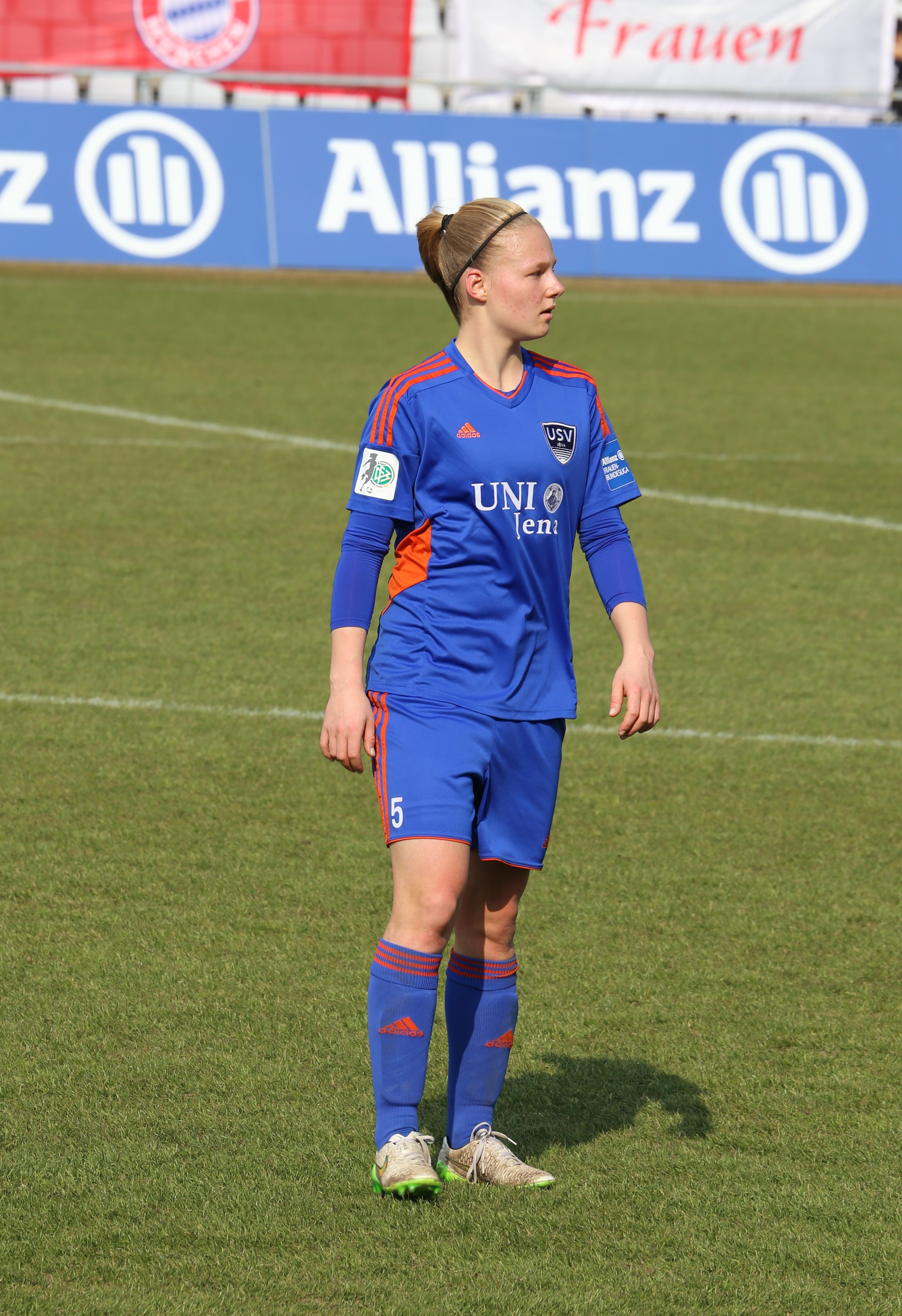
- Breitenbach in 2016

Personal information
- Date of birth: 14 March 1995 (age 31)
- Place of birth: Glauchau, Germany
- Height: 1.73 m (5 ft 8 in)
- Position: Defender

International career
Years	Team	Apps	(Gls)
2018	Germany U20	1	(0)

Annalena Breitenbach (born 14 March 1998) is a retired German footballer who played for FC Carl Zeiss Jena.

After retiring from professional football, she trained to become teacher in mathematics and sports in 2024 and took on an apprenticeship at a Saxon school in the summer of 2024.
