= Isabel Ortiz =

Paraguayan footballer (born 2001)

Personal information
- Full name: Isabel Rocío Ortiz Caniza
- Date of birth: 28 December 2001 (age 24)
- Height: 1.74 m (5 ft 9 in)
- Position: Goalkeeper

Team information
- Current team: Sol de América

Senior career*
Years	Team	Apps	(Gls)
–2018	Deportivo Humaitá		
2019–	Sol de América		

International career^{‡}
2018	Paraguay U20	3	(0)
2019–	Paraguay	1	(0)
- * Club domestic league appearances and goals ‡ National team caps and goals as of 4 October 2019

Isabel Rocío Ortiz Caniza (born 28 December 2001) is a Paraguayan footballer who plays as a goalkeeper for Club Sol de América and the Paraguay women's national team. She has previously played for the national under-20 squad.

== International career ==
Ortiz represented Paraguay at the 2018 FIFA U-20 Women's World Cup. She made her senior debut on 4 October 2019 in a 1–1 friendly draw against Venezuela.
