= Pauline Dechilly =

French footballer (born 1998)

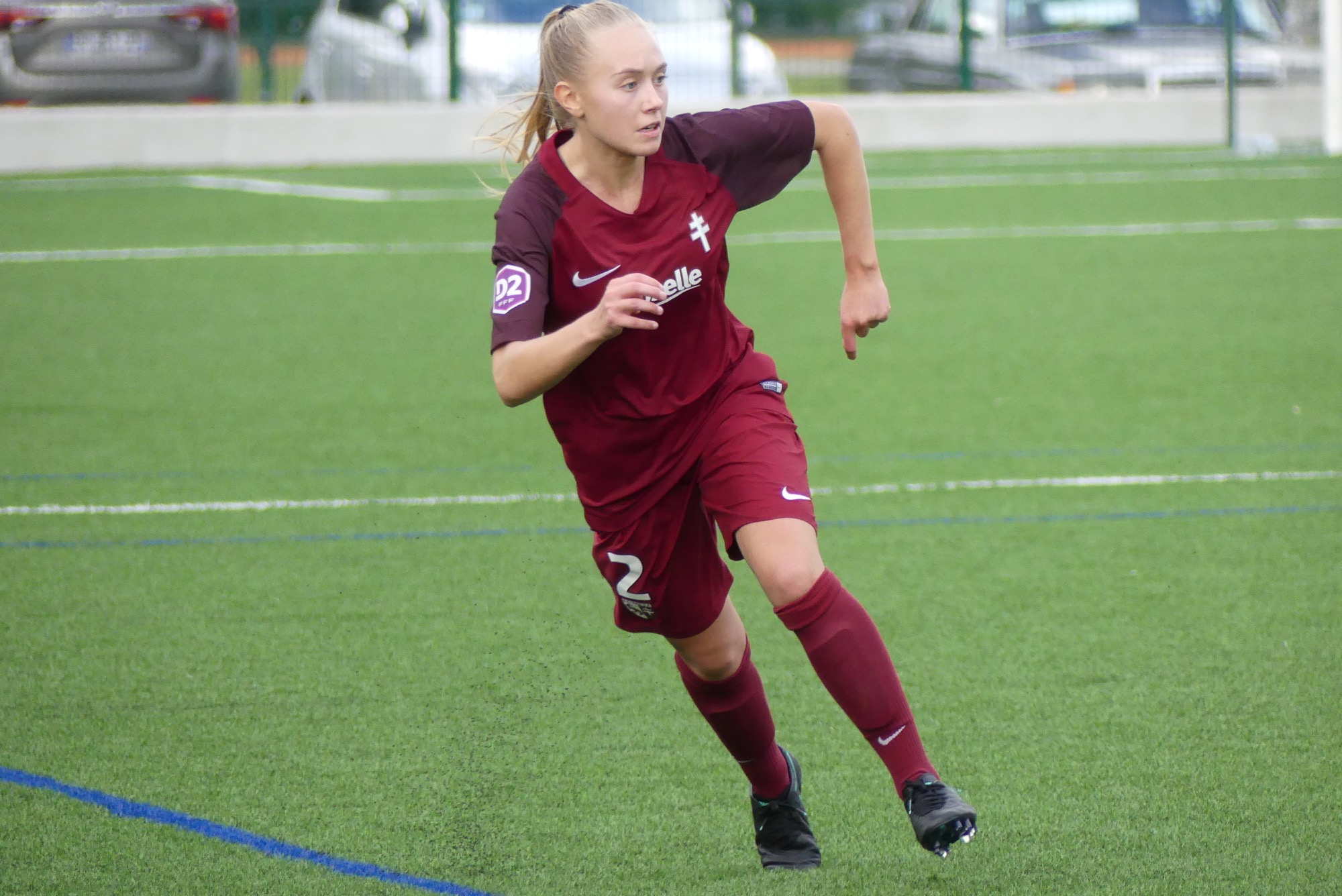
- Dechilly with Metz in 2016

Personal information
- Full name: Pauline Louise Dechilly
- Date of birth: 7 April 1998 (age 28)
- Place of birth: Paris, France
- Height: 1.60 m (5 ft 3 in)
- Position: Defender

Team information
- Current team: Strasbourg
- Number: 23

Youth career
- 2004–2012: CS Saint-Étienne Wolxheim
- 2012–2014: Vendenheim

Senior career*
Years	Team	Apps	(Gls)
2014–2016	Vendenheim	37	(1)
2016–2019	Metz	49	(0)
2019–2020	Dijon	0	(0)
2020–	Strasbourg	59	(1)

International career
2014	France U16	3	(0)
2014–2015	France U17	7	(0)
2016–2017	France U19	16	(0)
2017–2018	France U20	5	(0)
Medal record
Women's football
Representing France
UEFA Women's Under-19 Championship
Winner	2016 Slovakia
Runner-up	2017 Northern Ireland
- * Club domestic league appearances and goals as of 2 November 2024

Pauline Louise Dechilly (born 7 April 1998) is a French footballer who plays as a defender for Première Ligue club Strasbourg.

== Honours ==
Metz

- Seconde Ligue: 2017–18

Strasbourg

- Seconde Ligue: 2023–24

France U19

- UEFA Women's Under-19 Championship: 2016
