= Annamaria Serturini =

Italian footballer (born 1998)

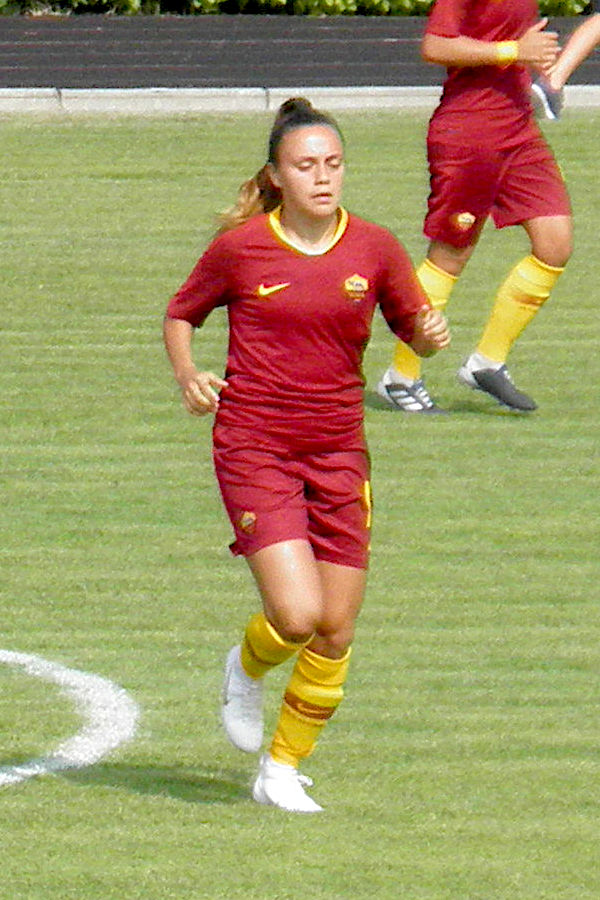
- Serturini playing for Roma in 2018

Personal information
- Date of birth: 13 May 1998 (age 28)
- Place of birth: Alzano Lombardo, Italy
- Height: 1.65 m (5 ft 5 in)
- Positions: Right midfielder; central midfielder; inside forward

Team information
- Current team: Juventus
- Number: 15

Senior career*
| Years | Team | Apps | (Gls) |
| 2014–2017 | Brescia | 31 | (7) |
| 2017–2018 | Pink Sport Time | 22 | (4) |
| 2018–2024 | Roma | 110 | (33) |
| 2024–2026 | Inter Milan | 39 | (8) |
| 2026– | Juventus | 0 | (0) |

International career^{‡}
| 2015– | Italy | 40 | (1) |
- * Club domestic league appearances and goals as of 6 July 2026 ‡ National team caps and goals as of 11 October 2026

Annamaria Serturini (born 13 May 1998) is an Italian professional footballer who plays as a right midfielder for Serie A club Juventus and the Italy women's national team.

== Club career ==
Serturini has played for Brescia, Pink Sport Time, AS Roma and currently plays for Inter Milan.

Serturini spent her youth career as part of Brescia's "golden generation" of Italian academy talents, with her performances for Brescia Primavera convincing senior team coach Milena Bertolini to promote Serturini to the Brescia first team for the 2014-15. Serturini made her first-team debut as a midfielder on 8 November 2014, coming on as a 71st-minute substitute in Brescia's 8-0 league victory over Pink Sport Time. Serturini would go on to make just two senior appearances for Brescia in her debut season, but did enough to pick up a Coppa Italia winner's medal from Brescia's trophy win in the spring of 2015. Serturini would then find more playing time and consistency in her sophomore season with the club.

Serturini would make 15 league appearances for Brescia in the 2015-16 Serie A season. She scored her first goals at senior level on the first Serie A matchday, scoring a brace in Brescia's 6-0 win over Vittorio Veneto. Serturini scored more goals for the club that season and made her continental debut in the UEFA Champions League on 11 November 2015, playing in Brescia's 1-0 win over Danish side Fortuna Hjørring. At the end of Serturini's second season with the club, she was part of the team that won a historic treble of Serie A, Italian Cup and Supercoppa Italiana trophies in a single season. She continued to play for Brescia in the 2016-17 season, in what would be her last season at the club. In the summer of 2017, Serturini agreed to move to Pink Sport Time in search of regular first-team football.

At Pink Sport Time, Serturini was played in all 22 leagues games for the 2017-18 season by Pink coach Roberto D'Ermillio. Serturini also played a significant amount of time with Pink's Primavera team, and was called up to Italy's U-23 national team by the winter of 2017. Serturini racked up a total 29 appearances in all competitions for relegation-threatened Pink Sport Time, while she scored 9 goals in total for the season. Serturini left the club after one season and agreed to move to A.S. Roma, once the newly-formed Serie A club was set up in the summer of 2018.

Serturini has reached several historical milestones during her time at Roma, both for the club and on an individual level. She became the club's first-ever goalscorer, when Serturini scored a penalty in Roma's opening-day defeat away to Sassuolo for the 2018-19 season. Serturini finished the 2018-19 season as the club's topscorer. On 11 October 2020, in her third consecutive season with Roma, Serturini became the first Roma player to make 50 appearances for the club and the first Roma player to score 20 goals for the club. She achieved this simultaneously in the same game, as she played and scored the opening goal in a 1-1 draw between Roma and Inter Milan. On 8 December 2020, Serturini achieved a personal milestone of 100 Serie A games.

On 30 May 2021, Serturini helped Roma win the club's first major trophy as the Giallorosse beat AC Milan on penalties to lift the 2021 Coppa Italia trophy. The trophy win meant Serturini collected her third Coppa Italia winner's medal in her career to date.

In February 2024, she joined Inter Milan, signing on until 30 June 2026.

On 6 July 2026, it was announced that Serturini had signed a three year contract with Juventus until 30 June 2029 and would wear the number 15 for the club.

== International career ==
Serturini was part of the Italy U-17 team that won third place at the FIFA U-17 World Cup in 2014. At senior level, Serturini played in the Cyprus Cup in 2019. She was then called up for the 2019 Women's World Cup squad. Serturini became the youngest-ever player to be called up for an Italy World Cup squad in women's football history.

Serturini was called up to the Italy squad for the 2019 FIFA Women's World Cup.

On 2 July 2023, Serturini was called up to the 23-player Italy squad for the 2023 FIFA Women's World Cup.

On 25 June 2025, Serturini was called up to the Italy squad for the UEFA Women's Euro 2025.

== Style of play ==
Growing up as a central midfielder, Annamaria Serturini is used to moving into the middle third of the pitch in order to make herself available to receive passes from her teammates before Serturini will use her dribbling ability and pace to carry the ball through the opponent's half of the pitch. In recent years, Serturini has matured into an inside forward making runs on the left flank. She will use her pace to run in behind the opponent's defensive line, using her ball control to receive through-balls that break the opponent's last line of defence before Serturini will run onto goal.

Serturini shows a preference for cutting inside and taking shots on goal with her right foot.

== Career statistics ==
| Season | Team | Championship | | | National Cup | | | International Cup | | | Other competitions | | | Totals | |
| Season | Team | Comp | Apps | Goals | Comp | Apps | Goals | Comp | Apps | Goals | Comp | Apps | Goals | Apps | Goals |
|---|---|---|---|---|---|---|---|---|---|---|---|---|---|---|---|
| 2014-2015 | (Italy) Brescia | A | 2 | 0 | CI | 0 | 0 | UWCL | - | - | SI | - | - | 2 | 0 |
| 2015-2016 | (Italy) Brescia | A | 16 | 4 | CI | 2 | 0 | UWCL | 1 | 0 | SI | 0 | 0 | 19 | 4 |
| 2016-2017 | (Italy) Brescia | A | 13 | 3 | CI | 2 | 0 | UWCL | 2 | 0 | SI | 0 | 0 | 17 | 3 |
| Total Brescia | | | 31 | 7 | | 4 | 0 | | 3 | 0 | | 0 | 0 | 38 | 7 |
| 2017-2018 | (Italy) Pink Sport Time | A | 22+2 | 4 | CI | 5 | 5 | - | - | - | - | - | - | 29 | 9 |
| 2018-2019 | (Italy) A.S Roma | A | 22 | 11 | CI | 5 | 2 | - | - | - | - | - | - | 27 | 13 |
| Total career | | | 77 | 22 | | 14 | 7 | | 3 | 0 | | 0 | 0 | 94 | 29 |
