= Catherine Karadjov =

Bulgarian footballer (born 1998)

Personal information
- Date of birth: 19 June 1998 (age 28)
- Place of birth: Ivry-sur-Seine, France
- Height: 1.71 m (5 ft 7 in)
- Positions: Forward; midfielder

Team information
- Current team: Orvault

Youth career
- 2013–2017: Juvisy
- 2017–2018: La Roche-sur-Yon ESO

Senior career*
| Years | Team | Apps | (Gls) |
| 2014–2017 | Juvisy | 3 | (0) |
| 2017–2019 | La Roche-sur-Yon ESO | 32 | (0) |
| 2021– | Orvault | | |

International career
| 2015 | France U17 | 3 | (0) |
| 2016–2017 | France U19 | 13 | (2) |
| 2024– | Bulgaria | 1 | (0) |
- * Club domestic league appearances and goals

Catherine Karadjov (Bulgarian: Катрин Караджов; born 19 June 1988) is a professional footballer who plays as a forward for French club Orvault. Born in France, she plays for the Bulgaria national team.

== International career ==
Catherine Karadjov has represented France at youth level before representing Bulgaria at senior level.
