= Gilles Eyquem =

French footballer and manager (born 1959)

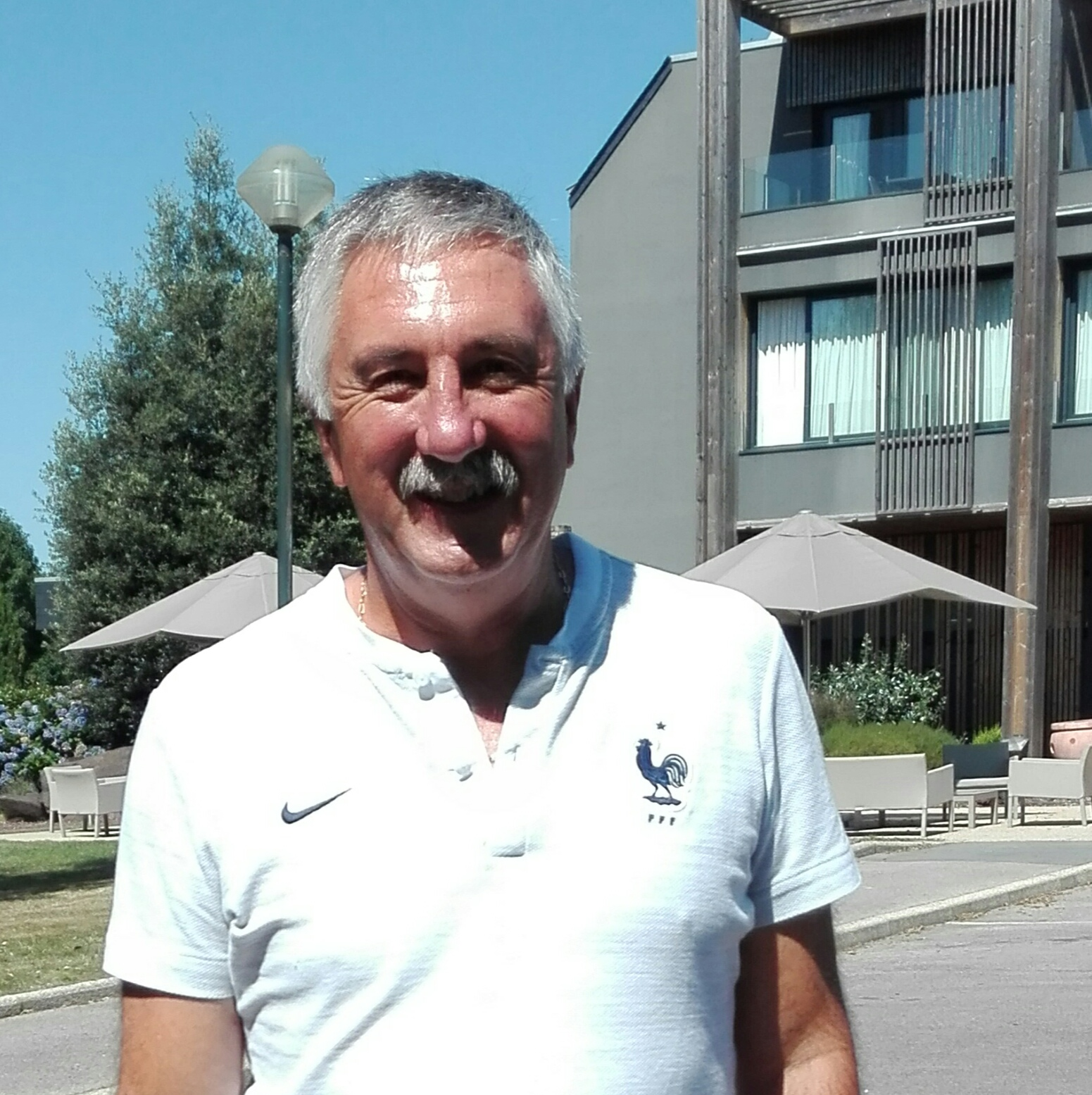

Personal information
- Full name: Gilles Eyquem
- Date of birth: 30 May 1959 (age 67)
- Place of birth: Bordeaux, France
- Height: 1.80 m (5 ft 11 in)
- Position: Defender

Senior career*
Years	Team	Apps	(Gls)
1977–1982	Bordeaux	46	(0)
1982–1983	Guingamp	0	(0)
1983–1985	Cannes	46	(1)
1985–1987	Chamois Niortais	67	(1)
1987–1989	Angers	61	(3)
1989–1991	Cherbourg	?	(?)

Managerial career
- 1989–1991: Cherbourg
- Agen
- France U16
- * Club domestic league appearances and goals

Gilles Eyquem (French pronunciation: [ʒil ekɛm]; born 30 May 1959 in Bordeaux, France) is a former professional footballer. He played as a central defender and is currently manager of the France under-16 national team.
