= Georgia Allen (footballer) =

English association footballer

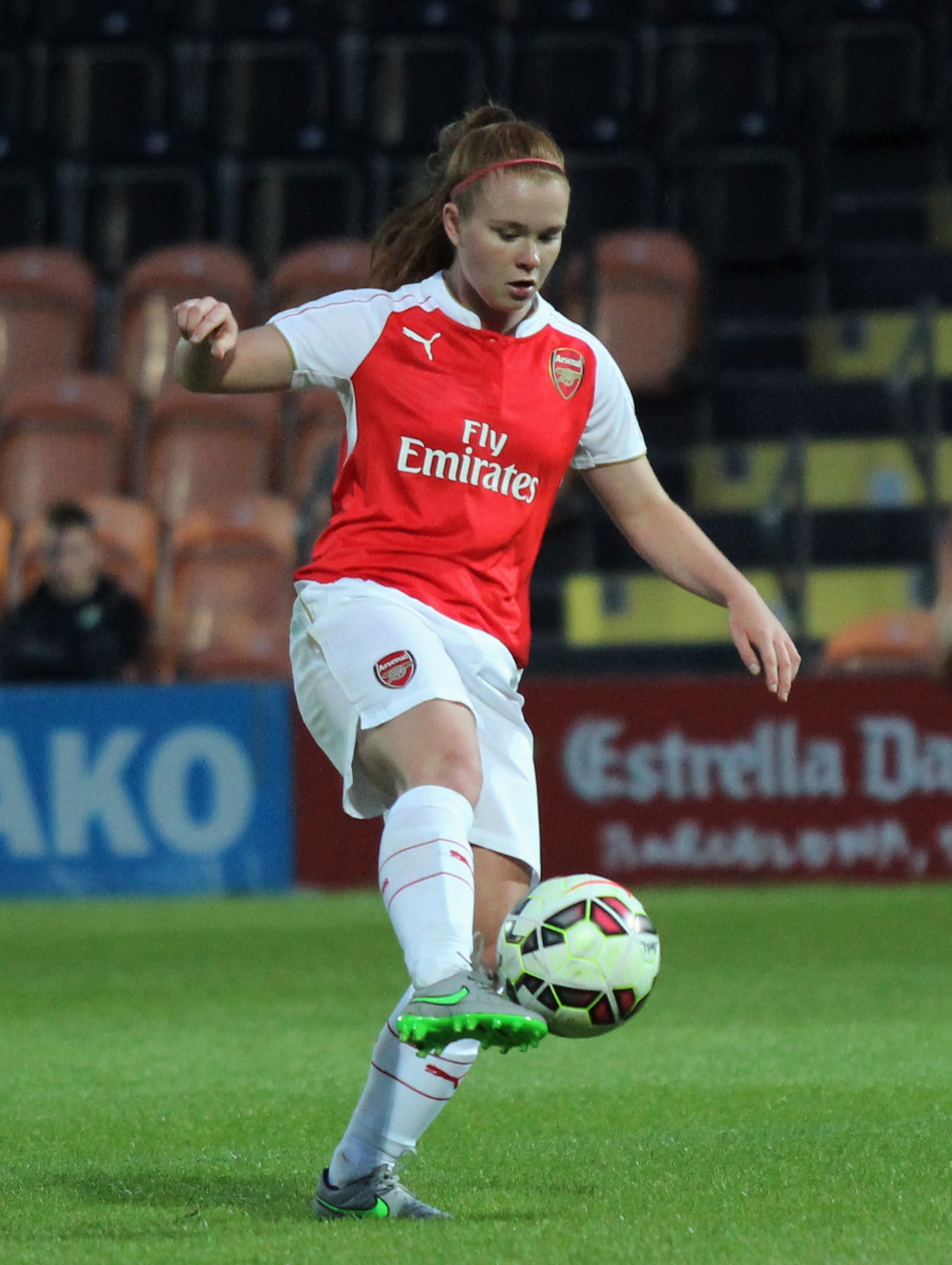

Personal information
- Date of birth: 27 June 1998 (age 28)
- Place of birth: Bury St Edmunds, England
- Height: 1.64 m (5 ft 5 in)
- Position: Midfielder

Team information
- Current team: Ipswich Town F.C.

College career
| Years | Team | Apps | (Gls) |
| 2017–2019 | Syracuse Orange | | |

International career
- England (women U-19)

Georgia Allen (born 16 June 1998) is an English former footballer who played in midfield for Ipswich Town.

Allen played for the Syracuse Orange women's soccer team representing Syracuse University from 2017–2019.

== International career ==
Allen has represented England at U20 level.
