= Emelyne Laurent =

French footballer (born 1998)

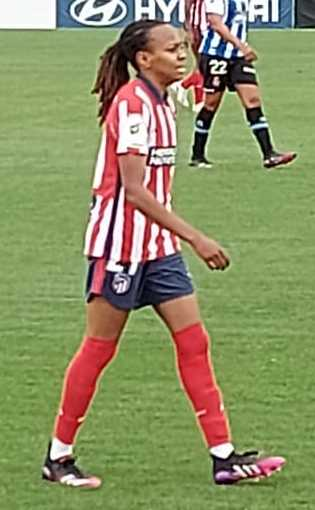
- Laurent with Atlético Madrid in 2021

Personal information
- Full name: Emelyne Ann-Emmanuelle Laurent
- Date of birth: 4 November 1998 (age 28)
- Place of birth: Fort-de-France, Martinique, France
- Height: 1.63 m (5 ft 4 in)
- Position: Forward

Team information
- Current team: Fleury
- Number: 11

Youth career
- 2009–2013: AS Samaritaine
- 2013–2016: Montpellier

Senior career*
Years	Team	Apps	(Gls)
2016	Montpellier	1	(0)
2016–2017	Bordeaux	9	(5)
2017–2022	Lyon	25	(5)
2019	→ Guingamp (loan)	7	(1)
2019–2020	→ Bordeaux (loan)	10	(1)
2020–2021	→ Atlético Madrid (loan)	27	(7)
2022–2023	Bayern Munich	15	(0)
2023–2025	AC Milan	35	(5)
2025–	Fleury	18	(10)

International career
2014	France U16	3	(1)
2014–2015	France U17	11	(1)
2016–2017	France U19	16	(5)
2017–2018	France U20	13	(7)
2019–2021	France U23	6	(3)
2018–2020	France	7	(1)
- * Club domestic league appearances and goals as of 05:09, 13 June 2026 (UTC)

Emelyne Ann-Emmanuelle Laurent (born 4 November 1998) is a French professional footballer who plays as a forward for French club Fleury.

== Club career ==
At club level, Laurent has played for Montpellier, Bordeaux and Lyon. In January 2019, Laurent was loaned to En Avant de Guingamp for the remainder of the season. Later in 2019, she was loaned to Bordeaux. In August 2020, she was loaned to Atlético Madrid for the season. She scored for Atlético in their 2020–21 UEFA Women's Champions League round of 16 second leg match against Chelsea. Atlético drew the match 1–1, but lost 3–1 on aggregate. In May 2022, Laurent signed for German club Bayern Munich on a three-year contract. On 29 July 2023, she joined Italian club AC Milan by signing a contract until 2025.

== International career ==
Laurent was France U-19's joint top goal scorer at the 2017 UEFA Women's Under-19 Championship, with three goals. She represented France U-20 in the 2018 FIFA U-20 Women's World Cup. In the opening match against Ghana U-20, she scored two goals, as France won 4–1. She scored 4 goals in the tournament, as France finished fourth.

Aged 19, Laurent made her senior team debut, coming on as a substitute in a friendly against Australia. In May 2019, Laurent was selected for the 2019 FIFA Women's World Cup in France. At the time, she had made three appearances for France. In 2021, she scored two goals in a match for France under-23s against Sweden under-23s.

== Personal life ==
Laurent is from Fort-de-France, Martinique. Aged 11, she started playing football for AS Samaritaine U-13. Laurent moved to Metropolitan France at the age of 14.

== Career statistics ==
=== International ===
As of 1 December 2020

Appearances and goals by national team and year
National team	Year	Apps	Goals
France	2018	2	0
France	2019	3	0
France	2020	2	1
Total		7	1

=== International goals ===
No.	Date	Venue	Opponent	Score	Result	Competition
1.	1 December 2020	Stade de la Rabine, Vannes, France	Kazakhstan	9–0	12–0	UEFA Women's Euro 2022 qualifying

== Honours ==
Lyon

- Division 1 Féminine: 2017–18, 2021–22
- UEFA Women's Champions League: 2017–18, 2021–22
- Trophée des Championnes: 2019

Atlético Madrid

- Supercopa de España Femenina: 2020–21

Bayern Munich

- Frauen-Bundesliga: 2022–23
