= Léna Goetsch =

French footballer (born 1999)

Personal information
- Full name: Léna Marie Goetsch
- Date of birth: 7 October 1999 (age 27)
- Place of birth: Colmar, France
- Height: 1.71 m (5 ft 7 in)
- Positions: Right-back; midfielder

Team information
- Current team: Fleury
- Number: 4

Youth career
- 2005–2013: FC Niederhergheim
- 2013–2014: FC Wintzfelden Osenbach 06
- 2014–2016: Vendenheim

Senior career*
Years	Team	Apps	(Gls)
2015–2019	Vendenheim	77	(1)
2019–2025	Dijon	118	(1)
2025–	Fleury	21	(0)

International career^{‡}
2015	France U16	2	(0)
2015–2016	France U17	10	(0)
2017–2018	France U19	10	(0)
2018	France U20	5	(0)
2024–	France U23	7	(0)
- * Club domestic league appearances and goals as of 05:14, 13 June 2026 (UTC) ‡ National team caps and goals as of 6 April 2025

Léna Marie Goetsch (born 7 October 1999) is a French professional footballer who plays as a right-back or midfielder for Première Ligue club Fleury.

== Club career ==
Goetsch made her league debut against Paris FC on 24 August 2019. She was a regular in the team during September–October 2019 as she was combining football with her sports studies. During her first season, Goetsch played 15 of the 16 league games. On 15 June 2023, she extended her contract with the club until June 2024. She scored her first league goal against Lyon on 3 March 2024, scoring in the 38th minute. On 7 May 2024, Goetsch extended her contract with the club until June 2025.

Goetsch was voted Dijon's Player of the Season by the fans for the 2023/24 season, in which she played all 22 matches.

== International career ==
Goetsch has been called up to French youth international groups.

== Personal life ==
Goetsch is one of the few professional footballers with diabetes.
