= Zoe Cross =

English association footballer

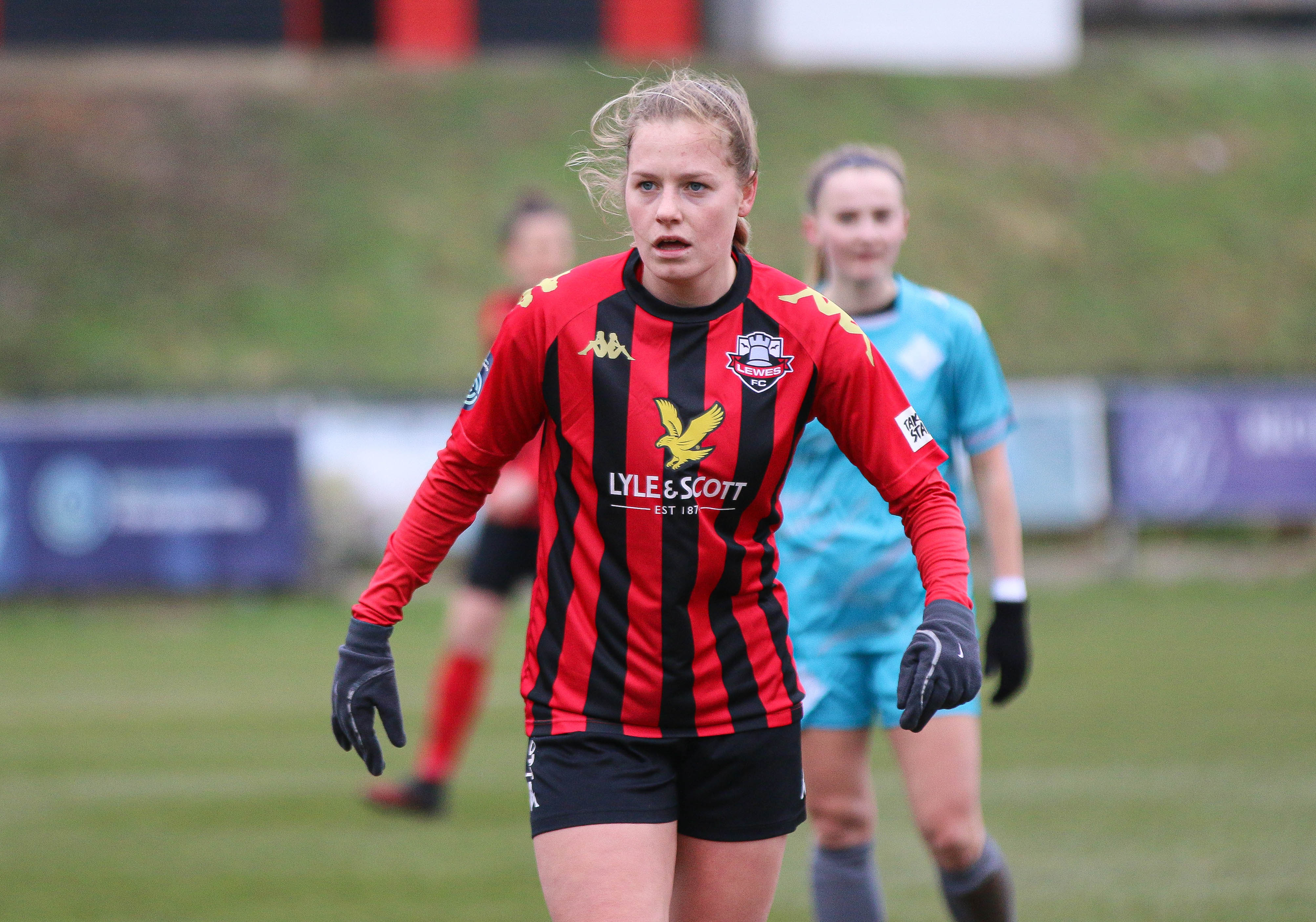

Personal information
- Date of birth: 6 February 1998 (age 28)
- Height: 1.67 m (5 ft 6 in)
- Position: Midfielder

Team information
- Current team: Lewes F.C.

International career
Years	Team	Apps	(Gls)
- England (women U-19)

Zoe Cross (born 6 February 1998) is a former English footballer who played in midfield for Lewes F.C.

== International career ==
Cross has represented England at youth level.
