= Julie Piga =

Footballer (born 1998)

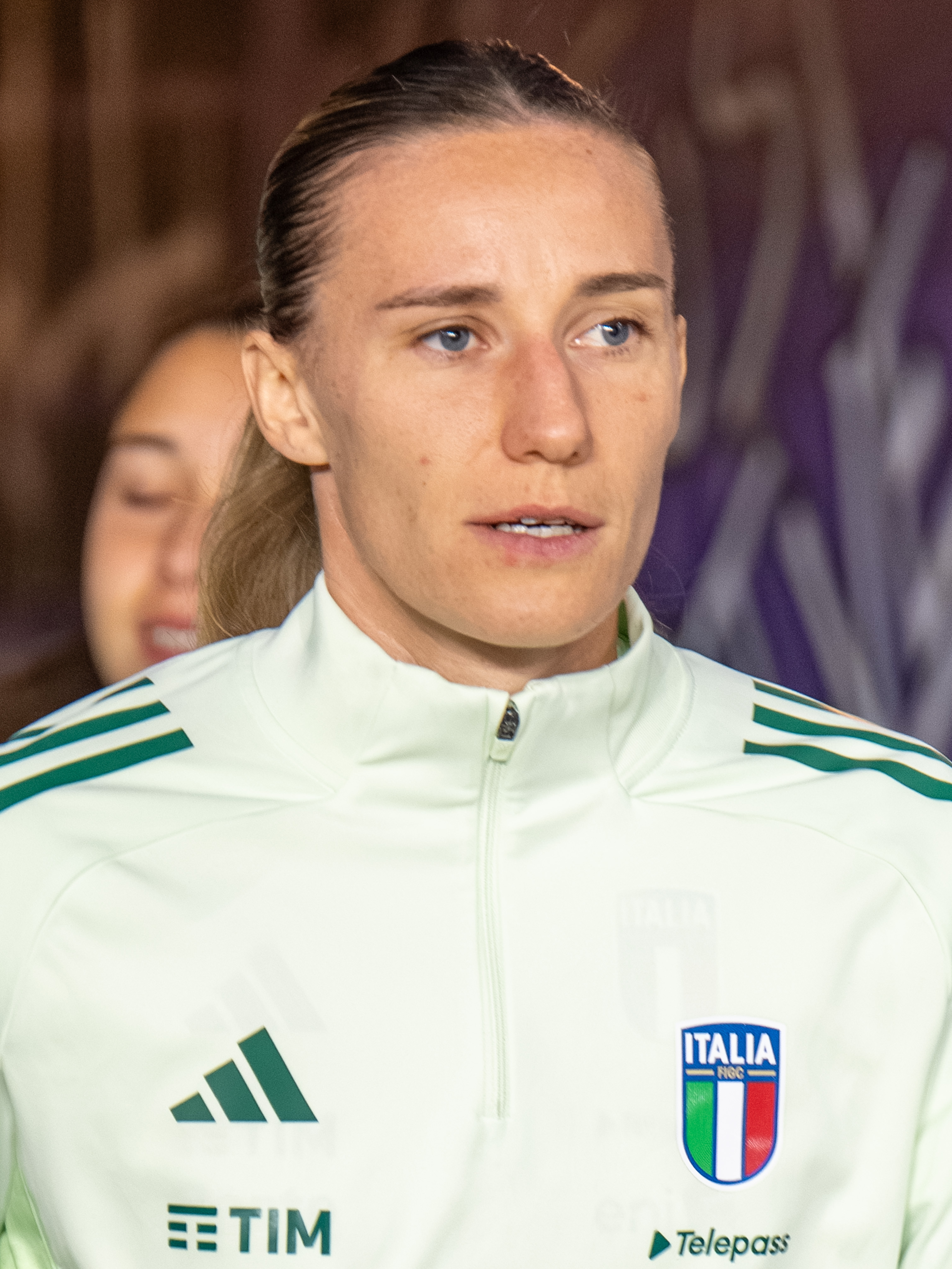
- Piga with Italy in 2025

Personal information
- Date of birth: 12 January 1998 (age 28)
- Place of birth: Lyon, France
- Height: 1.73 m (5 ft 8 in)
- Position: Defender

Team information
- Current team: AC Milan
- Number: 25

Senior career*
Years	Team	Apps	(Gls)
2016	Lyon	2	(0)
2017–2019	Grenoble	47	(5)
2020–2023	Fleury	63	(7)
2023–	AC Milan	7	(0)

International career
2014	France U16	2	(1)
2014–2015	France U17	15	(1)
2016–2017	France U19	12	(0)
2017–2018	France U20	10	(0)
2021–2022	France U23	2	(0)
2024–	Italy	7	(0)
- * Club domestic league appearances and goals

Julie Piga (born 12 January 1998) is a footballer who plays as a defender for AC Milan. Born in France to an Italian father, she represented France at youth international level before to being called up by the Italy women's national team.

== International career ==
Piga has represented France at youth level. At senior level Piga has switched to Italy.

On 25 June 2025, Piga was called up to the Italy squad for the UEFA Women's Euro 2025.
