= Christy Gavory =

French association footballer (born 1998)

Personal information
- Full name: Christy Sylvaine Gavory
- Date of birth: 5 May 1998 (age 28)
- Place of birth: Rouen, France
- Height: 1.60 m (5 ft 3 in)
- Position: Midfielder

Team information
- Current team: Le Havre
- Number: 22

Senior career*
Years	Team	Apps	(Gls)
2016–2020	Metz	74	(1)
2020–2022	Lens	26	(2)
2022–	Le Havre	48	(3)

International career
2014	France U16	3	(0)
2014–2015	France U17	11	(0)
2016–2017	France U19	15	(1)
2017–2018	France U20	12	(0)
- * Club domestic league appearances and goals as of 20:16, 22 November 2024 (UTC)

Christy Sylvaine Gavory (born 5 May 1998) is a French footballer who plays as a midfielder for Division 1 Féminine club Le Havre.

== Career ==
=== FC Metz ===
Gavory joined Metz in 2016. She made her league debut against Montpellier on 11 September 2016. Gavory scored her first league goal against Dijon on 1 December 2018, scoring in the 10th minute. After Metz' relegation in 2020, Gavory opted to leave Metz.

=== Lens ===
On 29 July 2020, Gavory was announced at Lens.

=== Le Havre ===
On 2 July 2022, Gavory was announced at Le Havre on a two year contract. She made her league debut against Bordeaux on 10 September 2022. Gavory scored her first league goal against PSG on 2 October 2022, scoring in the 52nd minute. She scored again two weeks later against Soyaux on 15 October 2022, scoring in the 4th minute.
