= Dina Orschmann =

German footballer

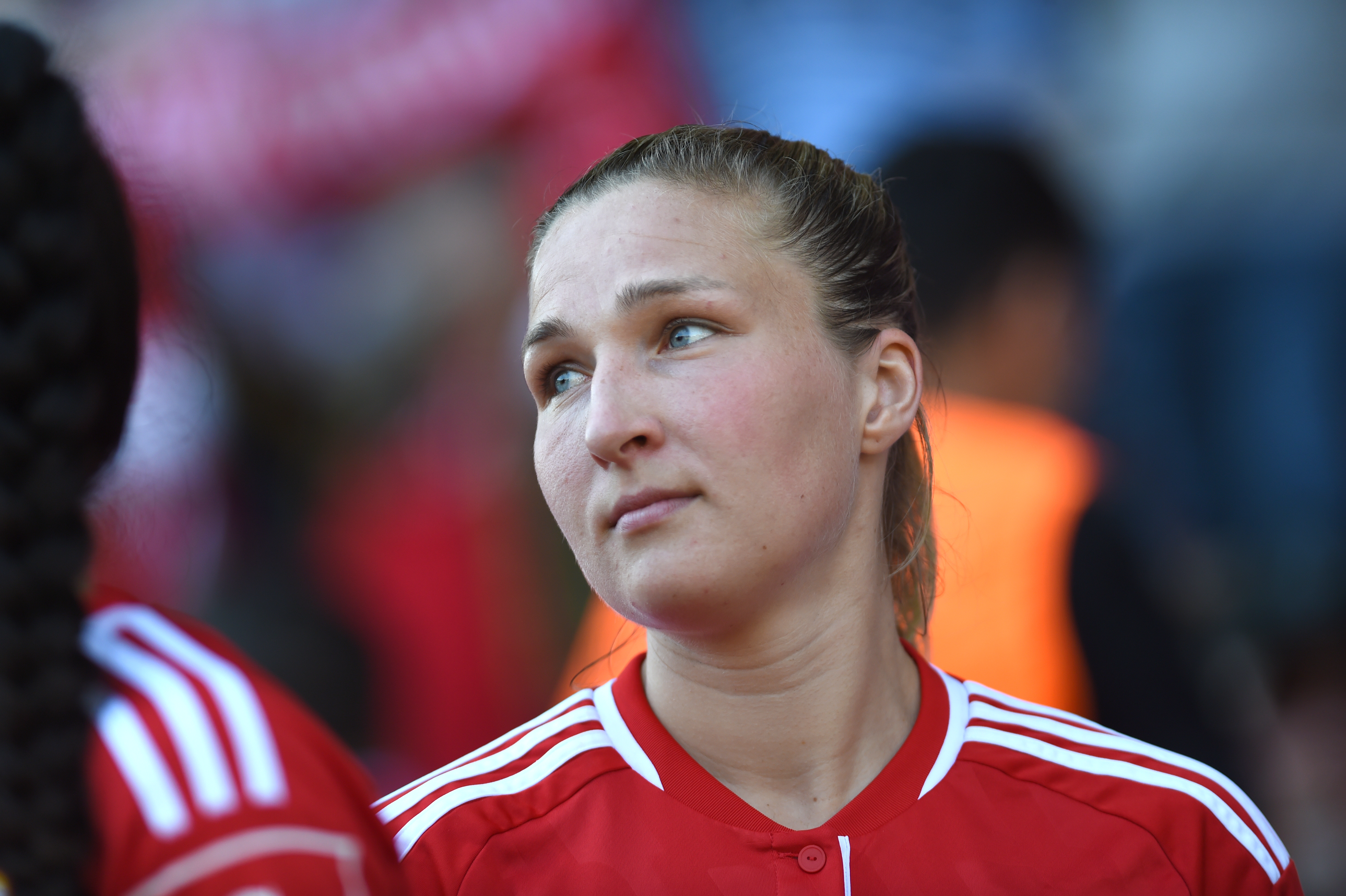
- Orschmann in 2024

Personal information
- Full name: Dina Sophia Orschmann
- Date of birth: 1 January 1998 (age 28)
- Place of birth: Berlin, Germany
- Height: 1.67 m (5 ft 5 1/2 in)
- Position: Midfielder

Team information
- Current team: 1. FC Union Berlin
- Number: 11

Youth career
- 2014–2017: SFC Star 1900
- 2013–2016: 1.FC Union Berlin

College career
Years	Team	Apps	(Gls)
2017–2018	UCF Knights	34	(9)

Senior career*
Years	Team	Apps	(Gls)
2014–2017	1. FC Union Berlin	52	(32)
2019	1. FFC Turbine Potsdam II	9	(9)
2019–2022	1. FFC Turbine Potsdam	42	(12)
2022	Rangers	8	(2)
2023–	1. FC Union Berlin	89	(57)

International career^{‡}
2015	Germany U17	7	(2)
2017	Germany U19	11	(2)
2016–2018	Germany U20	12	(1)
- * Club domestic league appearances and goals as of 20 November 2026 ‡ National team caps and goals as of 9 June 2019

Dina Sophia Orschmann (born 8 January 1998) is a German footballer who plays as a midfielder for 1. FC Union Berlin.

== Club career ==
Orschmann started her career with her twin sister Katja, in the youth team of SFC Stern 1900, before moving to 1. FC Union Berlin in 2013 and went through several Berlin selection teams up to U-18. At Union, she moved up to the senior team in October 2014. She made her debut in the Bundesliga second division on 26 April 2015 against VfL Bochum. She appeared in 13 games for Union Berlin, but could not avoid relegation. After being relegated to the Regional North League, Orschmann became a regular at Union and scored 22 goals in 20 games to get promoted back to the 2. Bundesliga.

After scoring nine goals for Berlin in 20 games in the 2. Bundesliga North in the 2016–17 season, she left to attend the University of Central Florida in the US, for whose football team Central Florida Knights she also played. On 4 February 2019 she returned to Germany and signed a six-month contract with Turbine Potsdam. Almost two months later, she made her Bundesliga debut in a 3–0 win over MSV Duisburg. On 22 May 2019 she renewed her contract for the 2019/20 season with Potsdam. In 2022, she joined Scottish side Rangers. In January 2023, she left Rangers to rejoin FC Union Berlin.

== International career ==
Orschmann made her U-17 debut on 17 February 2015 in a 4–2 win over England. Almost four months later, on 16 June 2015, she was called up to the U-17 European Championship squad.

She was included in the squad for the 2016 FIFA U-20 Women's World Cup in Papua New Guinea, She scored in the group match against South Korea. Germany reached the quarter-finals where they were defeated by France. She later took part in her second 2018 FIFA U-20 Woman's World Cup in France. Germany reached the quarter-final against Japan where they lost 1–3.

== Personal life ==
Since February 2026, Orschmann has been an ambassador for Empty Stands. Empty Stands is a support group of football fans affected by ME/CFS, Long COVID, and Post-Vac syndrome, which advocates for education, care, and better research into these conditions.
