= Kristin Kögel =

German footballer (born 1999)

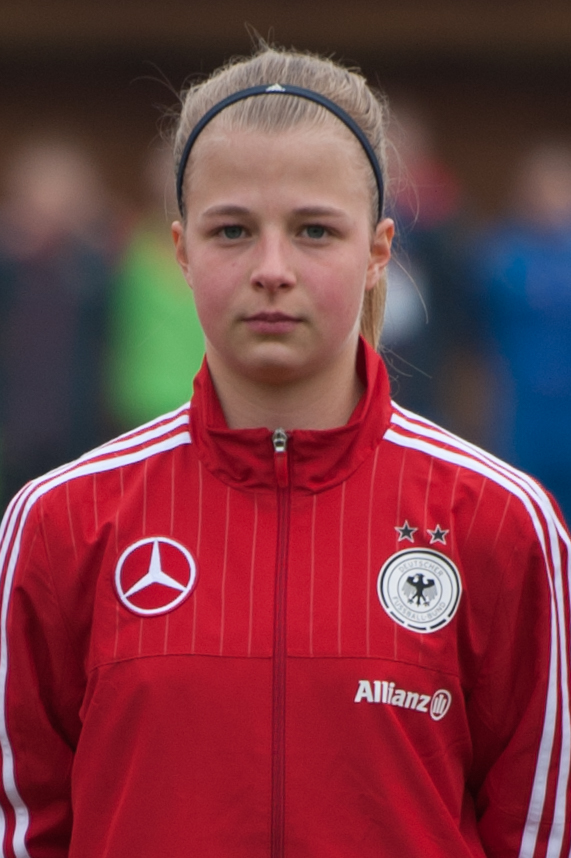

Personal information
- Date of birth: 21 September 1999 (age 27)
- Place of birth: Neu-Ulm, Germany
- Height: 1.55 m (5 ft 1 in)
- Position: Midfielder

Team information
- Current team: RC Strasbourg
- Number: 8

Senior career*
Years	Team	Apps	(Gls)
2016–2017	VfL Sindelfingen	20	(2)
2017–2020	Bayern Munich II	57	(12)
2019–2020	Bayern Munich	1	(0)
2020–2026	Bayer Leverkusen	126	(20)
2026–	RC Strasbourg	9	(3)

International career^{‡}
2014	Germany U15	1	(1)
2014–2015	Germany U16	7	(1)
2016	Germany U17	13	(0)
2017	Germany U19	7	(1)
2017–2018	Germany U20	7	(1)
2024–	Germany U23	6	(0)
- * Club domestic league appearances and goals as of 21 November 2026 ‡ National team caps and goals as of 2 September 2025

Kristin Kögel (born 21 September 1999) is a German footballer who plays as a midfielder for Première Ligue club Strasbourg.

== International career ==
Kögel has represented Germany at youth level.
