= 2018 UEFA Women's Under-19 Championship qualification =

Tournament details
- Dates: Qualifying round: 8 September – 31 October 2017; Elite round: 2 April – 11 June 2018
- Teams: 48 (from 1 confederation)

Tournament statistics
- Matches played: 114
- Goals scored: 487 (4.27 per match)
- Top scorer(s): (Netherlands) Fenna Kalma (13 goals)

The 2018 UEFA Women's Under-19 Championship qualifying competition was a women's under-19 football competition that determined the seven teams joining the automatically qualified hosts Switzerland in the 2018 UEFA Women's Under-19 Championship final tournament.

Apart from Switzerland, 48 of the remaining 54 UEFA member national teams entered the qualifying competition (including Kosovo who entered a competitive women's national team tournament for the first time). Players born on or after 1 January 1999 were eligible to participate. The competition consisted of a qualifying round and an elite round.

== Format ==
The qualifying competition consisted of two rounds:

- Qualifying round: The 48 teams were drawn into 12 groups of four teams. Each group was played in single round-robin format at one of the teams selected as hosts after the draw. The 12 group winners, the 12 runners-up, and the four third-placed teams with the best record against the first and second-placed teams in their group advanced to the elite round.
- Elite round: The 28 teams were drawn into seven groups of four teams. Each group was played in single round-robin format at one of the teams selected as hosts after the draw. The seven group winners qualified for the final tournament.

Initially, the elite round would consist of 24 teams, drawn into six groups of four teams, with the six group winners and the runner-up with the best record against the first and third-placed teams in their group qualifying for the final tournament. After the qualifying round draw was held, UEFA decided to expand the elite round from 24 to 28 teams, allowing four more third-placed teams to advance to the elite round.

The schedule of each mini-tournament was as follows (Regulations Article 20.04):

Matchday	Matches
Matchday 1	1 v 4, 3 v 2
Rest days (2 days)	—
Matchday 2	1 v 3, 2 v 4
Rest days (2 days)	—
Matchday 3	2 v 1, 4 v 3

=== Tiebreakers ===
In the qualifying round and elite round, teams are ranked according to points (3 points for a win, 1 point for a draw, 0 points for a loss), and if tied on points, the following tiebreaking criteria are applied, in the order given, to determine the rankings (Regulations Articles 14.01 and 14.02):

1. Points in head-to-head matches among tied teams;
2. Goal difference in head-to-head matches among tied teams;
3. Goals scored in head-to-head matches among tied teams;
4. If more than two teams are tied, and after applying all head-to-head criteria above, a subset of teams are still tied, all head-to-head criteria above are reapplied exclusively to this subset of teams;
5. Goal difference in all group matches;
6. Goals scored in all group matches;
7. Penalty shoot-out if only two teams have the same number of points, and they met in the last round of the group and are tied after applying all criteria above (not used if more than two teams have the same number of points, or if their rankings are not relevant for qualification for the next stage);
8. Disciplinary points (red card = 3 points, yellow card = 1 point, expulsion for two yellow cards in one match = 3 points);
9. UEFA coefficient for the qualifying round draw;
10. Drawing of lots.

To determine the four best third-placed teams from the qualifying round, the results against the teams in fourth place are discarded. The following criteria are applied (Regulations Article 15.01):

1. Points;
2. Goal difference;
3. Goals scored;
4. Disciplinary points;
5. UEFA coefficient for the qualifying round draw;
6. Drawing of lots.

== Qualifying round ==
=== Draw ===
The draw for the qualifying round was held on 11 November 2016, 10:00 CET (UTC+1), at the UEFA headquarters in Nyon, Switzerland.

The teams were seeded according to their coefficient ranking, calculated based on the following:

- 2014 UEFA Women's Under-19 Championship final tournament and qualifying competition (qualifying round and elite round)
- 2015 UEFA Women's Under-19 Championship final tournament and qualifying competition (qualifying round and elite round)
- 2016 UEFA Women's Under-19 Championship final tournament and qualifying competition (qualifying round and elite round)

Each group contained one team from Pot A, one team from Pot B, one team from Pot C, and one team from Pot D. For political reasons, Russia and Ukraine, Azerbaijan and Armenia, Serbia and Kosovo, and Bosnia and Herzegovina and Kosovo would not be drawn in the same group.

Final tournament hosts
Team	Coeff	Rank
**Switzerland**	9.333	—

Teams entering qualifying round

Pot A
Team	Coeff	Rank
**Spain**	15.667	1
**France**	12.500	2
**Germany**	12.333	3
England	11.667	4
Sweden	10.833	5
**Netherlands**	10.667	6
**Norway**	10.333	7
Scotland	9.000	8
Belgium	8.667	9
**Denmark**	8.500	10
Russia	7.833	11
Finland	7.667	12

Pot B
Team	Coeff	Rank
Austria	7.333	13
Republic of Ireland	7.333	14
**Italy**	7.000	15
Czech Republic	6.500	16
Portugal	6.500	17
Iceland	4.667	18
Poland	4.500	19
Romania	4.333	20
Serbia	4.167	21
Ukraine	4.000	22
Turkey	4.000	23
Slovenia	3.833	24

Pot C
Team	Coeff	Rank
Croatia	3.833	25
Northern Ireland	3.667	26
Hungary	3.667	27
Azerbaijan	3.500	28
Greece	3.500	29
Belarus	3.333	30
Bosnia and Herzegovina	3.333	31
Moldova	2.667	32
Slovakia	2.333	33
Wales	1.667	34
Montenegro	1.333	35
Estonia	1.333	36

Pot D
Team	Coeff	Rank
Faroe Islands	1.333	37
Macedonia	1.333	38
Cyprus	0.667	39
Israel	0.333	40
Albania	0.000	41
Bulgaria	0.000	42
Kazakhstan	0.000	43
Lithuania	0.000	44
Latvia	0.000	45
Georgia	0.000	46
Armenia	—	47
Kosovo	—	48

Notes

- Teams marked in **bold** have qualified for the final tournament.

Did not enter
Andorra
Gibraltar
Liechtenstein
Luxembourg
Malta
San Marino

=== Groups ===
The qualifying round must be played by 29 October 2017, and on the following FIFA International Match Calendar dates unless all four teams agree to play on another date:

- 11–19 September 2017
- 16–24 October 2017

Times up to 28 October 2017 are CEST (UTC+2), thereafter times are CET (UTC+1).

==== Group 1 ====
Pos	Team	Pld	W	D	L	GF	GA	GD	Pts	Qualification
1	Germany (H)	3	3	0	0	12	0	+12	**9**	Elite round
2	Iceland	3	2	0	1	9	1	+8	**6**	Elite round
3	Kosovo	3	0	1	2	1	6	−5	**1**	
4	Montenegro	3	0	1	2	1	16	−15	**1**	

Source: UEFA
Rules for classification: Qualification tiebreakers
(H) Hosts

Note: Iceland were originally to host.

12 September 2017
12:30

Montenegro	0–7	Iceland
	Report	Eiríksdóttir 47', 61'; Ragnarsdóttir 58'; Jóhannesdóttir 63'; Daníelsdóttir 65'; Einarsdóttir 83'; Árnadóttir 85'

Leichtathletikstadion Duisburg, Duisburg
Referee: Triinu Laos (Estonia)
12 September 2017
16:00

Germany	3–0	Kosovo
Oberdorf 31'; Ejupi 42' (o.g.); Wieder 48'	Report

Leichtathletikstadion Duisburg, Duisburg
Referee: Meliz Özçiğdem (Turkey)

15 September 2017
12:30

Iceland	2–0	Kosovo
Jóhannesdóttir 33', 85'	Report

Leichtathletikstadion Duisburg, Duisburg
Referee: Triinu Laos (Estonia)
15 September 2017
16:00

Germany	8–0	Montenegro
Schneider 20'; Čabarkapa 42' (o.g.); Šaranović 48' (o.g.); Kössler 58', 88'; Chmielinski 68'; Ebert 79', 84'	Report

Leichtathletikstadion Duisburg, Duisburg
Referee: Lois Otte (Belgium)

18 September 2017
12:00

Iceland	0–1	Germany
	Report	Kössler 9'

Leichtathletikstadion Duisburg, Duisburg
Referee: Lois Otte (Belgium)
18 September 2017
12:00

Kosovo	1–1	Montenegro
Shala 33'	Report	Šaranović 34'

PCC-Stadion, Homberg
Referee: Meliz Özçiğdem (Turkey)

==== Group 2 ====
Pos	Team	Pld	W	D	L	GF	GA	GD	Pts	Qualification
1	England	3	3	0	0	14	0	+14	**9**	Elite round
2	Slovenia	3	1	1	1	4	1	+3	**4**	Elite round
3	Wales	3	1	1	1	6	4	+2	**4**	Elite round
4	Kazakhstan (H)	3	0	0	3	0	19	−19	**0**	

Source: UEFA
Rules for classification: Qualification tiebreakers
(H) Hosts
18 October 2017
08:00

England	9–0	Kazakhstan
Smith 10'; Hinds 17'; Filbey 23'; Toone 38', 84'; Morgan 60'; Joel 62'; Jones 68'; Rayner 86'	Report

BIIK Stadium, Shymkent
Referee: Anastasia Romanyuk (Ukraine)
18 October 2017
11:00

Wales	0–0	Slovenia
	Report

BIIK Stadium, Shymkent
Referee: Volha Tsiareshka (Belarus)

21 October 2017
08:00

Slovenia	4–0	Kazakhstan
Mori 63', 90+1'; Česnik 69'; Makovec 90'	Report

BIIK Stadium, Shymkent
Referee: Volha Tsiareshka (Belarus)
21 October 2017
11:00

England	4–0	Wales
Toone 27'; Watson 52' (o.g.); Filbey 72'; Hemp 80'	Report

BIIK Stadium, Shymkent
Referee: Vivian Peeters (Netherlands)

24 October 2017
08:00

Slovenia	0–1	England
	Report	Hemp 89'

BIIK Stadium, Shymkent
Referee: Vivian Peeters (Netherlands)
24 October 2017
08:00

Kazakhstan	0–6	Wales
	Report	Pike 15', 38'; Davies 45+2'; Powell 62' (pen.); Evan-Watkins 67', 90+3'

BIIK Stadium, Shymkent
Referee: Anastasia Romanyuk (Ukraine)

==== Group 3 ====
Pos	Team	Pld	W	D	L	GF	GA	GD	Pts	Qualification
1	Denmark	3	3	0	0	18	2	+16	**9**	Elite round
2	Slovakia	3	2	0	1	5	7	−2	**6**	Elite round
3	Romania	3	1	0	2	6	12	−6	**3**	
4	Lithuania (H)	3	0	0	3	2	10	−8	**0**	

Source: UEFA
Rules for classification: Qualification tiebreakers
(H) Hosts
8 September 2017
14:00

Slovakia	3–2	Romania
Šurnovská 5'; Dârle 13' (o.g.); Bogorová 22'	Report	Predoi 35'; Boroș 66'

Sūduva Stadium, Marijampolė
Referee: Graziella Pirriatore (Italy)
8 September 2017
17:00

Denmark	5–1	Lithuania
Holt Andersen 38'; Jankovska 40', 81'; Svava 43'; Nielsen 52'	Report	Potapova 85'

Alytus Stadium, Alytus
Referee: Vera Opeykina (Russia)

11 September 2017
14:00

Denmark	5–1	Slovakia
Gejl 19' (pen.); Holmgaard 41'; Svava 63'; Jankovska 74'; Nielsen 79'	Report	Mikolajová 61'

Sūduva Stadium, Marijampolė
Referee: Ivana Martinčić (Croatia)
11 September 2017
17:00

Romania	4–1	Lithuania
Boroș 12', 20', 68' (pen.); Piperea 70'	Report	Vaitukaitytė 45' (pen.)

Alytus Stadium, Alytus
Referee: Graziella Pirriatore (Italy)

14 September 2017
17:00

Romania	0–8	Denmark
	Report	Hovmark 15', 77', 80'; Jankovska 38', 66'; Nielsen 49'; Hashemi 61', 74'

Sūduva Stadium, Marijampolė
Referee: Ivana Martinčić (Croatia)
14 September 2017
17:00

Lithuania	0–1	Slovakia
	Report	Gmitterová 45+2'

Alytus Stadium, Alytus
Referee: Vera Opeykina (Russia)

==== Group 4 ====
Pos	Team	Pld	W	D	L	GF	GA	GD	Pts	Qualification
1	Spain	3	3	0	0	18	0	+18	**9**	Elite round
2	Azerbaijan	3	1	1	1	2	6	−4	**4**	Elite round
3	Ukraine	3	1	0	2	5	6	−1	**3**	
4	Albania (H)	3	0	1	2	0	13	−13	**1**	

Source: UEFA
Rules for classification: Qualification tiebreakers
(H) Hosts
25 October 2017
12:00

Azerbaijan	2–0	Ukraine
Ozdemir 40'; Seyfatdinova 90+3'	Report

Kamëz Stadium, Kamëz
Referee: Hannelore Onsea (Belgium)
25 October 2017
14:00

Spain	8–0	Albania
Bautista 9', 41'; Abelleira 17', 40'; Fernández 20', 44'; Egurrola 68', 73'	Report

Niko Dovana Stadium, Durrës
Referee: Tanja Racic (Bosnia and Herzegovina)

28 October 2017
12:00

Spain	6–0	Azerbaijan
Torrodà 6'; Márquez 31'; Egurrola 41'; Rodríguez 44'; Bautista 57', 69'	Report

Kamëz Stadium, Kamëz
Referee: Jurgita Mačikunytė (Lithuania)
28 October 2017
14:00

Ukraine	5–0	Albania
Kozlova 25', 57'; Kunina 35', 90+3'; Mullaj 36' (o.g.)	Report

Niko Dovana Stadium, Durrës
Referee: Hannelore Onsea (Belgium)

31 October 2017
14:00

Ukraine	0–4	Spain
	Report	Fernández 25'; Carmona 64', 85'; Bautista 80' (pen.)

Kamëz Stadium, Kamëz
Referee: Jurgita Mačikunytė (Lithuania)
31 October 2017
14:00

Albania	0–0	Azerbaijan
	Report

Niko Dovana Stadium, Durrës
Referee: Tanja Racic (Bosnia and Herzegovina)

==== Group 5 ====
Pos	Team	Pld	W	D	L	GF	GA	GD	Pts	Qualification
1	Norway	3	3	0	0	15	0	+15	**9**	Elite round
2	Portugal (H)	3	2	0	1	9	2	+7	**6**	Elite round
3	Northern Ireland	3	1	0	2	2	10	−8	**3**	
4	Cyprus	3	0	0	3	1	15	−14	**0**	

Source: UEFA
Rules for classification: Qualification tiebreakers
(H) Hosts
18 October 2017
15:00

Norway	6–0	Cyprus
Haug 50', 65'; Linberg 53', 88'; Sørum 60'; Norheim 82'	Report

Estádio Municipal de Mangualde, Mangualde
Referee: Viola Raudziņa (Latvia)
18 October 2017
17:00

Northern Ireland	0–2	Portugal
	Report	Silva 32'; Inês 90+3'

Estádio do Fontelo, Viseu
Referee: Ivana Projkovska (Macedonia)

Matches of the first matchday were postponed from 17 to 18 October due to wildfires in Portugal.

20 October 2017
17:00

Norway	7–0	Northern Ireland
Haug 9', 63'; Norheim 43' (pen.); Olsen 81', 87'; Hamilton 82' (o.g.); Tvedten 83'	Report

Estádio Municipal de Nelas, Nelas
Referee: Ivana Projkovska (Macedonia)
20 October 2017
17:00

Portugal	7–0	Cyprus
Meira 45'; Martins 47', 64', 81' (pen.); Macedo 56', 90+3'; Silva 76'	Report

Estádio Municipal de Mangualde, Mangualde
Referee: Ewa Augustyn (Poland)

23 October 2017
16:00

Portugal	0–2	Norway
	Report	Eckhoff 63'; Norheim 68'

Estádio do Fontelo, Viseu
Referee: Ivana Projkovska (Macedonia)
23 October 2017
16:00

Cyprus	1–2	Northern Ireland
Michael 32'	Report	Hamilton 51'; Bassett 87' (pen.)

Estádio Municipal de Nelas, Nelas
Referee: Viola Raudziņa (Latvia)

==== Group 6 ====
Pos	Team	Pld	W	D	L	GF	GA	GD	Pts	Qualification
1	Netherlands (H)	3	3	0	0	32	2	+30	**9**	Elite round
2	Republic of Ireland	3	2	0	1	8	8	0	**6**	Elite round
3	Latvia	3	1	0	2	2	16	−14	**3**	
4	Estonia	3	0	0	3	1	17	−16	**0**	

Source: UEFA
Rules for classification: Qualification tiebreakers
(H) Hosts
18 October 2017
17:00

Estonia	0–3	Republic of Ireland
	Report	Noonan 1'; McManus 55', 60'

Sportpark de Bosk, Harkema
Attendance: 50
Referee: Marta Huerta De Aza (Spain)
18 October 2017
19:00

Netherlands	12–0	Latvia
Weerden 6', 12', 15'; Ter Beek 14', 42'; Waterham 21'; Pelova 26', 34'; Dijkstra 44'; Van Deursen 76'; Smits 90+1', 90+1'	Report

Sportpark Marsdijk, Assen
Attendance: 412
Referee: Ana Minić (Serbia)

21 October 2017
13:00

Republic of Ireland	4–0	Latvia
Mooney 27'; Casey 51'; Ruddy 60'; O'Callaghan 83'	Report

Sportpark Marsdijk, Assen
Attendance: 65
Referee: Marta Huerta De Aza (Spain)
21 October 2017
16:00

Netherlands	12–1	Estonia
Kalma 3', 25', 65', 66', 78', 90+1'; Jansen 14'; Pelova 17'; Casparij 53'; Weerden 64'; Wilms 74'; Räämet 85' (o.g.)	Report	Kuslap 55'

Sportpark de Bosk, Harkema
Attendance: 287
Referee: Eleni Antoniou (Greece)

24 October 2017
19:00

Republic of Ireland	1–8	Netherlands
Ruddy 84'	Report	Pelova 24'; Waterham 35'; Kalma 39', 42', 43'; Casparij 56'; Smits 78' (pen.), 79'

Sportpark Marsdijk, Assen
Attendance: 350
Referee: Eleni Antoniou (Greece)
24 October 2017
19:00

Latvia	2–0	Estonia
Fjodorova 29'; Miksone 80'	Report

Sportpark de Bosk, Harkema
Attendance: 78
Referee: Ana Minić (Serbia)

==== Group 7 ====
Pos	Team	Pld	W	D	L	GF	GA	GD	Pts	Qualification
1	France	3	3	0	0	25	2	+23	**9**	Elite round
2	Italy	3	2	0	1	19	5	+14	**6**	Elite round
3	Faroe Islands	3	1	0	2	4	20	−16	**3**	
4	Moldova (H)	3	0	0	3	0	21	−21	**0**	

Source: UEFA
Rules for classification: Qualification tiebreakers
(H) Hosts
16 October 2017
13:00

France	11–0	Faroe Islands
Delabre 14', 30'; Palis 22', 59'; Khelifi 25', 54', 56'; Bourma 63' (pen.); Rey 84'; Cardia 88'; Roux 90'	Report

CSR Orhei, Orhei
Referee: Reelika Turi (Estonia)
16 October 2017
13:00

Moldova	0–8	Italy
	Report	Bonfantini 2', 82'; Cacciamali 9'; Caruso 18'; Cantore 76', 90+2', 90+4'; Nichele 78'

Zimbru Stadium-2, Chișinău
Referee: Désirée Grundbacher (Switzerland)

19 October 2017
13:00

France	9–0	Moldova
Richard 12'; Canon 16', 26', 60'; Roux 66', 87'; Khelifi 82'; Bayo 83'; Delabre 90'	Report

Zimbru Stadium-2, Chișinău
Referee: Cheryl Foster (Wales)
19 October 2017
13:00

Italy	9–0	Faroe Islands
Glionna 6', 42'; Baldi 13'; Santoro 15'; Regazzoli 28', 55', 90+1'; Caruso 56'; Bonfantini 73'	Report

CSR Orhei, Orhei
Referee: Désirée Grundbacher (Switzerland)

22 October 2017
13:00

Italy	2–5	France
Kergal 2' (o.g.); Polli 67'	Report	Delabre 8', 49', 90+4'; Lakrar 21'; Khelifi 84'

CSR Orhei, Orhei
Referee: Cheryl Foster (Wales)
22 October 2017
13:00

Faroe Islands	4–0	Moldova
Mittfoss 48', 55'; Hansen 59'; Benbakoura 85'	Report

Zimbru Stadium-2, Chișinău
Referee: Reelika Turi (Estonia)

==== Group 8 ====
Pos	Team	Pld	W	D	L	GF	GA	GD	Pts	Qualification
1	Austria (H)	3	3	0	0	9	0	+9	**9**	Elite round
2	Belgium	3	2	0	1	12	4	+8	**6**	Elite round
3	Croatia	3	1	0	2	1	11	−10	**3**	
4	Macedonia	3	0	0	3	1	8	−7	**0**	

Source: UEFA
Rules for classification: Qualification tiebreakers
(H) Hosts
17 October 2017
11:00

Belgium	5–1	Macedonia
Van Belle 39', 68'; Vanderdonckt 44'; Minnaert 69'; Toloba 80'	Report	Maksuti 20'

Gansbärenstadion, Rohrbach an der Lafnitz
Referee: Galiya Echeva (Bulgaria)
17 October 2017
17:00

Croatia	0–4	Austria
	Report	Hrnjkaš 31' (o.g.); Bachler 36'; Brunnthaler 39'; Wienroither 47'

Thermenstadion, Bad Waltersdorf
Referee: Marta Frias Acedo (Spain)

20 October 2017
11:00

Belgium	7–0	Croatia
Toloba 5', 53', 88'; Dhondt 29'; Minnaert 32'; Petry 52'; Kerckhofs 85'	Report

Thermenstadion, Bad Waltersdorf
Referee: Sarah Garratt (England)
20 October 2017
17:00

Austria	2–0	Macedonia
Scharnböck 80'; Brunnthaler 90+3'	Report

Gansbärenstadion, Rohrbach an der Lafnitz
Referee: Marta Frias Acedo (Spain)

23 October 2017
17:00

Austria	3–0	Belgium
Mössner 22'; Hickelsberger 52'; Klein 90+2' (pen.)	Report

Gansbärenstadion, Rohrbach an der Lafnitz
Referee: Sarah Garratt (England)
23 October 2017
17:00

Macedonia	0–1	Croatia
	Report	Spajić 38'

Thermenstadion, Bad Waltersdorf
Referee: Galiya Echeva (Bulgaria)

==== Group 9 ====
Pos	Team	Pld	W	D	L	GF	GA	GD	Pts	Qualification
1	Czech Republic	3	3	0	0	19	0	+19	**9**	Elite round
2	Sweden	3	2	0	1	9	2	+7	**6**	Elite round
3	Belarus	3	1	0	2	2	10	−8	**3**	
4	Bulgaria (H)	3	0	0	3	0	18	−18	**0**	

Source: UEFA
Rules for classification: Qualification tiebreakers
(H) Hosts
18 October 2017
13:00

Belarus	0–8	Czech Republic
	Report	K. Dubcová 22'; M. Dubcová 30', 64'; Siváková 36' (pen.); Stašková 56', 84', 88'; Šlajsová 72'

Druzhba Stadium, Dobrich
Referee: Silvia Domingos (Portugal)
18 October 2017
13:30

Sweden	7–0	Bulgaria
Lilja 19'; Engström 69', 79'; Hed 70'; Nyström 75', 90+3'; Nyberg 83'	Report

Albena Stadium, Albena
Referee: Aleksandra Česen (Slovenia)

21 October 2017
13:00

Sweden	2–0	Belarus
Kullashi 72'; Scherbo 75' (o.g.)	Report

Albena Stadium, Albena
Referee: Barbara Poxhofer (Austria)
21 October 2017
13:30

Czech Republic	9–0	Bulgaria
Stašková 18', 44', 45+1'; Radová 22'; M. Dubcová 53', 86'; Bohatová 56'; Khýrová 80'; K. Dubcová 89'	Report

Druzhba Stadium, Dobrich
Referee: Silvia Domingos (Portugal)

24 October 2017
13:30

Czech Republic	2–0	Sweden
K. Dubcová 57' (pen.); Stašková 72'	Report

Druzhba Stadium, Dobrich
Referee: Barbara Poxhofer (Austria)
24 October 2017
13:30

Bulgaria	0–2	Belarus
	Report	Olkhovik 7'; Lodyga 60'

Albena Stadium, Albena
Referee: Aleksandra Česen (Slovenia)

==== Group 10 ====
Pos	Team	Pld	W	D	L	GF	GA	GD	Pts	Qualification
1	Hungary (H)	3	3	0	0	12	2	+10	**9**	Elite round
2	Turkey	3	1	1	1	7	5	+2	**4**	Elite round
3	Scotland	3	1	1	1	2	2	0	**4**	Elite round
4	Armenia	3	0	0	3	0	12	−12	**0**	

Source: UEFA
Rules for classification: Qualification tiebreakers
(H) Hosts
18 October 2017
13:00

Scotland	2–0	Armenia
Davidson 62'; Andriasyan 83' (o.g.)	Report

Király Sportlétesítmény, Szombathely
Referee: Ifeoma Kulmala (Finland)
18 October 2017
13:00

Hungary	5–2	Turkey
Pulins 12'; Csiki 18'; Tolnai 28', 86'; Oláh 70'	Report	Eren 90+1'

Sportcentrum Bük, Bük
Referee: Maria Marotta (Italy)

21 October 2017
13:00

Scotland	0–2	Hungary
	Report	Tolnai 89'; Muir 90+2' (o.g.)

Sportcentrum Bük, Bük
Referee: Elvira Nurmustafina (Kazakhstan)
21 October 2017
13:00

Turkey	5–0	Armenia
Türkoğlu 49', 57' (pen.), 66'; Karapetyan 82' (o.g.); Hançar 87'	Report

Király Sportlétesítmény, Szombathely
Referee: Maria Marotta (Italy)

24 October 2017
13:00

Turkey	0–0	Scotland
	Report

Király Sportlétesítmény, Szombathely
Referee: Elvira Nurmustafina (Kazakhstan)
24 October 2017
13:00

Armenia	0–5	Hungary
	Report	Csigi 2' (pen.); Pulins 34'; Csiki 68', 90+3'; Molnár 85'

Sportcentrum Bük, Bük
Referee: Ifeoma Kulmala (Finland)

==== Group 11 ====
Pos	Team	Pld	W	D	L	GF	GA	GD	Pts	Qualification
1	Serbia	3	2	1	0	7	1	+6	**7**	Elite round
2	Finland (H)	3	1	2	0	12	2	+10	**5**	Elite round
3	Israel	3	0	2	1	3	6	−3	**2**	Elite round
4	Bosnia and Herzegovina	3	0	1	2	2	15	−13	**1**	

Source: UEFA
Rules for classification: Qualification tiebreakers
(H) Hosts
12 September 2017
12:00

Bosnia and Herzegovina	0–3	Serbia
	Report	Frajtović 18'; Hamzić 57' (o.g.); Poljak 90+3'

Eerikkilä Areena, Tammela
Referee: Justina Lavrenovaitė (Lithuania)
12 September 2017
16:00

Finland	1–1	Israel
Rantala 65'	Report	Winstok 90+3'

Eerikkilä Areena, Tammela
Referee: Vera Onică (Moldova)

15 September 2017
12:00

Serbia	3–0	Israel
Poljak 21'; Trbojević 45+1'; Ivanović 63'	Report

Eerikkilä Areena, Tammela
Referee: Justina Lavrenovaitė (Lithuania)
15 September 2017
16:00

Finland	10–0	Bosnia and Herzegovina
Tulkki 10', 35', 59'; Rantala 19', 23'; Tuominen 31', 67', 72'; Nyrhinen 46'; Haikonen 90'	Report

Eerikkilä Areena, Tammela
Referee: Karolina Radzik-Johan (Poland)

18 September 2017
18:00

Serbia	1–1	Finland
Poljak 21'	Report	Ojanen 89'

Eerikkilä Areena, Tammela
Referee: Karolina Radzik-Johan (Poland)
18 September 2017
18:00

Israel	2–2	Bosnia and Herzegovina
Haj 58'; Elinav 62'	Report	Gačanica 26'; Habibović 90'

Kaurialan kenttä, Hämeenlinna
Referee: Vera Onică (Moldova)

==== Group 12 ====
Pos	Team	Pld	W	D	L	GF	GA	GD	Pts	Qualification
1	Poland	3	2	1	0	12	3	+9	**7**	Elite round
2	Russia	3	1	2	0	6	2	+4	**5**	Elite round
3	Greece	3	0	2	1	2	4	−2	**2**	Elite round
4	Georgia (H)	3	0	1	2	1	12	−11	**1**	

Source: UEFA
Rules for classification: Qualification tiebreakers
(H) Hosts
12 September 2017
15:00

Russia	4–0	Georgia
Cherkasova 34'; Organova 63'; Dubova 81'; Nikitina 90+2' (pen.)	Report

Mikheil Meskhi Stadium-2, Tbilisi
Referee: Ana Aguiar (Portugal)
12 September 2017
17:00

Greece	1–3	Poland
Pouliou 59'	Report	Karczewska 28'; Ratajczyk 45'; Parczewska 75'

David Petriashvili Stadium, Tbilisi
Referee: Angelika Söder (Germany)

15 September 2017
15:00

Poland	7–0	Georgia
Zbyrad 8'; Zając 27'; Ratajczyk 30'; Miłek 32' (pen.), 40' (pen.); Osińska 35', 90+3'	Report

Mikheil Meskhi Stadium-2, Tbilisi
Referee: Angelika Söder (Germany)
15 September 2017
17:00

Russia	0–0	Greece
	Report

David Petriashvili Stadium, Tbilisi
Referee: Tania Fernandes Morais (Luxembourg)

18 September 2017
15:00

Poland	2–2	Russia
Ratajczyk 11'; Zawistowska 49'	Report	Kuzmina 45' (pen.); Nikitina 85'

David Petriashvili Stadium, Tbilisi
Referee: Tania Fernandes Morais (Luxembourg)
18 September 2017
15:00

Georgia	1–1	Greece
Khaburdzania 39'	Report	Chatzinikolaou 89' (pen.)

Mikheil Meskhi Stadium-2, Tbilisi
Referee: Ana Aguiar (Portugal)

=== Ranking of third-placed teams ===
To determine the four best third-placed teams from the qualifying round which advance to the elite round, only the results of the third-placed teams against the first and second-placed teams in their group are taken into account.

Pos	Grp	Team	Pld	W	D	L	GF	GA	GD	Pts	Qualification
1	12	Greece	2	0	1	1	1	3	−2	1	Elite round
2	10	Scotland	2	0	1	1	0	2	−2	1	Elite round
3	11	Israel	2	0	1	1	1	4	−3	1	Elite round
4	2	Wales	2	0	1	1	0	4	−4	1	Elite round
5	1	Kosovo	2	0	0	2	0	5	−5	0	
6	4	Ukraine	2	0	0	2	0	6	−6	0	
7	3	Romania	2	0	0	2	2	11	−9	0	
8	5	Northern Ireland	2	0	0	2	0	9	−9	0	
9	9	Belarus	2	0	0	2	0	10	−10	0	
10	8	Croatia	2	0	0	2	0	11	−11	0	
11	6	Latvia	2	0	0	2	0	16	−16	0	
12	7	Faroe Islands	2	0	0	2	0	20	−20	0	

Source: UEFA
Rules for classification: 1) points; 2) goal difference; 3) goals scored; 4) disciplinary points; 5) coefficient; 6) drawing of lots.

== Elite round ==
=== Draw ===
The draw for the elite round was held on 24 November 2017, 11:00 CET (UTC+1), at the UEFA headquarters in Nyon, Switzerland.

The teams were seeded according to their results in the qualifying round. Each group contained one team from Pot A, one team from Pot B, one team from Pot C, and one team from Pot D. Winners and runners-up from the same qualifying round group could not be drawn in the same group, but the best third-placed teams could be drawn in the same group as winners or runners-up from the same qualifying round group.

Pos	Grp	Team	Pld	W	D	L	GF	GA	GD	Pts	Seeding
1	6	Netherlands	3	3	0	0	32	2	+30	9	Pot A
2	7	France	3	3	0	0	25	2	+23	9	Pot A
3	9	Czech Republic	3	3	0	0	19	0	+19	9	Pot A
4	4	Spain	3	3	0	0	18	0	+18	9	Pot A
5	3	Denmark	3	3	0	0	18	2	+16	9	Pot A
6	5	Norway	3	3	0	0	15	0	+15	9	Pot A
7	2	England	3	3	0	0	14	0	+14	9	Pot A
8	1	Germany	3	3	0	0	12	0	+12	9	Pot B
9	10	Hungary	3	3	0	0	12	2	+10	9	Pot B
10	8	Austria	3	3	0	0	9	0	+9	9	Pot B
11	12	Poland	3	2	1	0	12	3	+9	7	Pot B
12	11	Serbia	3	2	1	0	7	1	+6	7	Pot B
13	7	Italy	3	2	0	1	19	5	+14	6	Pot B
14	8	Belgium	3	2	0	1	12	4	+8	6	Pot B
15	1	Iceland	3	2	0	1	9	1	+8	6	Pot C
16	9	Sweden	3	2	0	1	9	2	+7	6 (Note: Tied on disciplinary points (1 pt), ranked by coefficient (ranking for qualifying round draw: Sweden: 5th; Portugal: 17th).)	Pot C
17	5	Portugal	3	2	0	1	9	2	+7	6	Pot C
18	6	Republic of Ireland	3	2	0	1	8	8	0	6	Pot C
19	3	Slovakia	3	2	0	1	5	7	−2	6	Pot C
20	11	Finland	3	1	2	0	12	2	+10	5	Pot C
21	12	Russia	3	1	2	0	6	2	+4	5	Pot C
22	2	Slovenia	3	1	1	1	4	1	+3	4	Pot D
23	10	Turkey	3	1	1	1	7	5	+2	4	Pot D
24	2	Wales (Y)	3	1	1	1	6	4	+2	4	Pot D
25	10	Scotland (Y)	3	1	1	1	2	2	0	4	Pot D
26	4	Azerbaijan	3	1	1	1	2	6	−4	4	Pot D
27	12	Greece (Y)	3	0	2	1	2	4	−2	2	Pot D
28	11	Israel (Y)	3	0	2	1	3	6	−3	2	Pot D

Source: UEFA
Rules for classification: 1) points; 2) goal difference; 3) goals scored; 4) disciplinary points; 5) coefficient; 6) drawing of lots.
(Y) Third-placed teams from qualifying round (may be drawn with teams from same qualifying round group)

=== Groups ===
The elite round must be played on the following FIFA International Match Calendar dates unless all four teams agree to play on another date:

- 2–10 April 2018
- 4–12 June 2018

All times are CEST (UTC+2).

==== Group 1 ====
Pos	Team	Pld	W	D	L	GF	GA	GD	Pts	Qualification
1	Norway	3	3	0	0	8	1	+7	9	Final tournament
2	Iceland	3	2	0	1	3	2	+1	6	
3	Poland (H)	3	1	0	2	6	2	+4	3	
4	Greece	3	0	0	3	1	13	−12	0	

Source: UEFA
Rules for classification: Qualification tiebreakers
(H) Hosts
5 June 2018
17:00

Norway	5–1	Greece
Nautnes 5', 51'; Birkeli 35'; Eckhoff 65'; Norheim 80'	Report	Papaioannou 26'

OSiR Włocławek, Włocławek
Referee: Désirée Grundbacher (Switzerland)
5 June 2018
17:00

Iceland	1–0	Poland
Einarsdóttir 19'	Report

Stadion Miejski, Toruń
Referee: Silvia Domingos (Portugal)

8 June 2018
12:00

Norway	2–0	Iceland
Haug 4'; Norheim 24'	Report

Stadion Miejski im. Inowrocławskich Olimpijczyków, Inowrocław
Referee: Elvira Nurmustafina (Kazakhstan)
8 June 2018
17:00

Poland	6–0	Greece
Gąsieniec 4', 51'; Turkiewicz 6'; Zawadzka 34'; Olszewska 64'; Parczewska 88' (pen.)	Report

Stadion Miejski im. Inowrocławskich Olimpijczyków, Inowrocław
Referee: Silvia Domingos (Portugal)

11 June 2018
17:00

Poland	0–1	Norway
	Report	Haug 82'

OSiR Włocławek, Włocławek
Referee: Elvira Nurmustafina (Kazakhstan)
11 June 2018
17:00

Greece	0–2	Iceland
	Report	Eiríksdóttir 67'; Halldórsdóttir 72'

Stadion Miejski, Toruń
Referee: Désirée Grundbacher (Switzerland)

==== Group 2 ====
Pos	Team	Pld	W	D	L	GF	GA	GD	Pts	Qualification
1	Germany	3	3	0	0	14	2	+12	9	Final tournament
2	England	3	2	0	1	12	4	+8	6	
3	Israel	3	0	1	2	1	7	−6	1	
4	Slovakia (H)	3	0	1	2	0	14	−14	1	

Source: UEFA
Rules for classification: Qualification tiebreakers
(H) Hosts
3 April 2018
15:00

England	4–1	Israel
Galloway 5'; Palmer 31'; Ngunga 68'; Toone 90+4' (pen.)	Report	Elinav 75'

Športový areál OFK, Dunajská Lužná
Referee: Ivana Projkovska (Macedonia)
3 April 2018
17:00

Slovakia	0–8	Germany
	Report	Stolze 27', 67', 81', 85' (pen.); Krumbiegel 63', 88'; Lemešová 72' (o.g.); Oberdorf 83'

NTC Senec, Senec
Referee: Tania Fernandes Morais (Luxembourg)

6 April 2018
11:00

Germany	3–0	Israel
Schneider 10'; Meyer 14'; Stolze 67'	Report

Športový areál OFK, Dunajská Lužná
Referee: Tania Fernandes Morais (Luxembourg)
6 April 2018
17:00

England	6–0	Slovakia
Ngunga 16', 21'; Cain 28'; Allen 62'; Toone 79' (pen.); Hayles 85'	Report

NTC Senec, Senec
Referee: Eleni Antoniou (Greece)

9 April 2018
11:00

Germany	3–2	England
Stolze 3'; Krumbiegel 59'; Oberdorf 84'	Report	Cain 13'; Hemp 87'

Športový areál OFK, Dunajská Lužná
Referee: Eleni Antoniou (Greece)
9 April 2018
11:00

Israel	0–0	Slovakia
	Report

NTC Senec, Senec
Referee: Ivana Projkovska (Macedonia)

==== Group 3 ====
Pos	Team	Pld	W	D	L	GF	GA	GD	Pts	Qualification
1	France	3	3	0	0	9	1	+8	9	Final tournament
2	Finland (H)	3	2	0	1	7	2	+5	6	
3	Belgium	3	1	0	2	5	4	+1	3	
4	Azerbaijan	3	0	0	3	1	15	−14	0	

Source: UEFA
Rules for classification: Qualification tiebreakers
(H) Hosts
4 April 2018
11:30

France	6–0	Azerbaijan
Delabre 10' (pen.), 19', 30'; Boussaha 67', 70'; Cardia 90+2'	Report

Lahden kisapuisto, Lahti
Referee: Rebecca Welch (England)
4 April 2018
17:30

Finland	2–0	Belgium
Rantala 70' (pen.), 79'	Report

Lahden kisapuisto, Lahti
Referee: Tess Olofsson (Sweden)

7 April 2018
11:30

Belgium	5–1	Azerbaijan
Merkelbach 41'; Toloba 51', 71'; Minnaert 70' (pen.); Vierendeels 85'	Report	Kanpara 88'

Lahden kisapuisto, Lahti
Referee: Tess Olofsson (Sweden)
7 April 2018
17:30

France	2–1	Finland
Roux 34'; Delabre 83'	Report	Rantala 21'

Lahden kisapuisto, Lahti
Referee: Maria Marotta (Italy)

10 April 2018
17:30

Belgium	0–1	France
	Report	Roux 2'

Lahden kisapuisto, Lahti
Referee: Maria Marotta (Italy)
10 April 2018
17:30

Azerbaijan	0–4	Finland
	Report	Nyrhinen 45'; Rantala 61', 79'; Peuhkurinen 89'

Myyrmäen jalkapallostadion, Vantaa
Referee: Rebecca Welch (England)

==== Group 4 ====
Pos	Team	Pld	W	D	L	GF	GA	GD	Pts	Qualification
1	Spain	3	3	0	0	11	0	+11	9	Final tournament
2	Turkey	3	1	1	1	3	6	−3	4	
3	Austria	3	0	2	1	2	5	−3	2	
4	Republic of Ireland (H)	3	0	1	2	1	6	−5	1	

Source: UEFA
Rules for classification: Qualification tiebreakers
(H) Hosts
2 April 2018
16:00

Republic of Ireland	1–1	Austria
Noonan 48'	Report	Schneider 21'

Turners Cross, Cork
Referee: Justina Lavrenovaite (Lithuania)
2 April 2018
20:00

Spain	5–0	Turkey
Rodríguez 11'; Andújar 26'; Egurrola 31'; Bautista 58'; Márquez 79'	Report

The Mardyke, Cork
Referee: Lucie Šulcová (Czech Republic)

5 April 2018
16:00

Austria	1–1	Turkey
Bachler 5'	Report	Ay 69'

The Mardyke, Cork
Referee: Justina Lavrenovaite (Lithuania)
5 April 2018
20:00

Spain	3–0	Republic of Ireland
Márquez 41', 71'; Bautista 77'	Report

Turners Cross, Cork
Referee: Elvira Nurmustafina (Kazakhstan)

8 April 2018
15:00

Austria	0–3	Spain
	Report	Serrano 25'; Rodríguez 45+1'; Wienroither 59' (o.g.)

The Mardyke, Cork
Referee: Elvira Nurmustafina (Kazakhstan)
8 April 2018
15:00

Turkey	2–0	Republic of Ireland
Hançar 55'; Manya 83'	Report

Turners Cross, Cork
Referee: Lucie Šulcová (Czech Republic)

==== Group 5 ====
Pos	Team	Pld	W	D	L	GF	GA	GD	Pts	Qualification
1	Netherlands	3	2	1	0	13	1	+12	7	Final tournament
2	Sweden	3	2	1	0	4	2	+2	7	
3	Hungary (H)	3	1	0	2	2	7	−5	3	
4	Slovenia	3	0	0	3	1	10	−9	0	

Source: UEFA
Rules for classification: Qualification tiebreakers
(H) Hosts
4 April 2018
16:00

Netherlands	6–0	Slovenia
Waterham 7'; Jansen 40'; Smits 45+2', 82'; Doorn 79'; Van Deursen 90+1'	Report

Üllői Városi Sporttelep, Üllő
Referee: Irena Velevačkoska (Macedonia)
4 April 2018
16:00

Sweden	1–0	Hungary
Hed 67'	Report

Globall Football Park, Telki
Referee: Meliz Özçiğdem (Turkey)

7 April 2018
16:00

Netherlands	1–1	Sweden
Kalma 88'	Report	Kullashi 42' (pen.)

Városi Stadion, Csákvár
Referee: Graziella Pirriatore (Italy)
7 April 2018
16:00

Hungary	2–0	Slovenia
Tolnai 40', 47'	Report

Globall Football Park, Telki
Referee: Meliz Özçiğdem (Turkey)

10 April 2018
16:00

Hungary	0–6	Netherlands
	Report	Kalma 47', 66', 86'; Pelova 78', 80'; Van Deursen 90+2'

Globall Football Park, Telki
Referee: Graziella Pirriatore (Italy)
10 April 2018
16:00

Slovenia	1–2	Sweden
Agrež 24'	Report	Gebreyohannes 34'; Kullashi 49'

Üllői Városi Sporttelep, Üllő
Referee: Irena Velevačkoska (Macedonia)

==== Group 6 ====
Pos	Team	Pld	W	D	L	GF	GA	GD	Pts	Qualification
1	Denmark	3	3	0	0	8	1	+7	9	Final tournament
2	Serbia	3	2	0	1	5	3	+2	6	
3	Wales	3	1	0	2	2	5	−3	3	
4	Portugal (H)	3	0	0	3	1	7	−6	0	

Source: UEFA
Rules for classification: Qualification tiebreakers
(H) Hosts
2 April 2018
16:00

Denmark	2–0	Wales
Holt Andersen 17'; Johansen 75'	Report

Estádio Municipal Carlos Duarte, Pampilhosa
Referee: Marta Frias Acedo (Spain)
2 April 2018
18:00

Portugal	0–2	Serbia
	Report	Ivanović 15'; Poljak 79'

Estádio Municipal Sérgio Conceição, Coimbra
Referee: Volha Tsiareshka (Belarus)

5 April 2018
16:00

Serbia	3–1	Wales
Filipović 39'; Poljak 56'; Ivanović 65'	Report	Thomas 78'

Estádio Municipal Sérgio Conceição, Coimbra
Referee: Volha Tsiareshka (Belarus)
5 April 2018
18:00

Denmark	4–1	Portugal
Thomsen 5', 60'; Hashemi 18', 58'	Report	Inês 42'

Complexo Desportivo da Tocha, Tocha
Referee: Barbara Poxhofer (Austria)

8 April 2018
18:00

Serbia	0–2	Denmark
	Report	Thomsen 53'; Gejl 90+1'

Estádio Municipal Dr. Américo Couto, Mealhada
Referee: Barbara Poxhofer (Austria)
8 April 2018
18:00

Wales	1–0	Portugal
Vine 48'	Report

Centro de Treino, Luso
Referee: Marta Frias Acedo (Spain)

==== Group 7 ====
Pos	Team	Pld	W	D	L	GF	GA	GD	Pts	Qualification
1	Italy	3	2	1	0	13	4	+9	7	Final tournament
2	Czech Republic	3	2	1	0	11	3	+8	7	
3	Scotland (H)	3	0	1	2	2	6	−4	1	
4	Russia	3	0	1	2	1	14	−13	1	

Source: UEFA
Rules for classification: Qualification tiebreakers
(H) Hosts
2 April 2018
14:00

Czech Republic	2–1	Scotland
K. Dubcová 59'; Stašková 76'	Report	Dudová 87' (o.g.)

Oriam National Performance Centre, Edinburgh
Referee: Marta Huerta De Aza (Spain)
2 April 2018
19:00

Russia	1–7	Italy
Shesterneva 45'	Report	Regazzoli 12'; Caruso 18' (pen.); Merlo 39'; Cantore 45+1', 47'; Bonfantini 71', 88'

Oriam National Performance Centre, Edinburgh
Referee: Ewa Augustyn (Poland)

5 April 2018
14:00

Czech Republic	7–0	Russia
M. Dubcová 9'; Dudová 26'; Malatová 27'; Vojtková 60', 70'; Khýrová 66'; Stašková 90'	Report

Oriam National Performance Centre, Edinburgh
Referee: Angelika Soeder (Germany)
5 April 2018
19:00

Italy	4–1	Scotland
Bonfantini 31', 53'; Kuenrath 45+1'; Caruso 90+4' (pen.)	Report	Kerr 1'

Oriam National Performance Centre, Edinburgh
Referee: Ewa Augustyn (Poland)

8 April 2018
14:00

Italy	2–2	Czech Republic
Cantore 47'; Caruso 51'	Report	K. Dubcová 31'; M. Dubcová 75'

Oriam National Performance Centre, Edinburgh
Referee: Angelika Soeder (Germany)
8 April 2018
14:00

Scotland	0–0	Russia
	Report

Ainslie Park, Edinburgh
Referee: Marta Huerta De Aza (Spain)

== Qualified teams ==
The following eight teams qualified for the final tournament.

Team	Qualified as	Qualified on	Previous appearances in Women's Under-19 Euro^{1} only U-19 era (since 2002)
Switzerland	Hosts	26 January 2015	7 (2002, 2004, 2005, 2006, 2009, 2011, 2016)
Norway	Elite round Group 1 winners	11 June 2018	11 (2002, 2003, 2004, 2007, 2008, 2009, 2011, 2013, 2014, 2015, 2016)
Germany	Elite round Group 2 winners	9 April 2018	14 (**2002**, 2003, 2004, 2005, **2006**, **2007**, 2008, 2009, 2010, **2011**, 2013, 2015, 2016, 2017)
France	Elite round Group 3 winners	10 April 2018	13 (2002, **2003**, 2004, 2005, 2006, 2007, 2008, 2009, **2010**, **2013**, 2015, **2016**, 2017)
Spain	Elite round Group 4 winners	5 April 2018	12 (2002, 2003, **2004**, 2007, 2008, 2010, 2011, 2012, 2014, 2015, 2016, **2017**)
Netherlands	Elite round Group 5 winners	10 April 2018	7 (2003, 2006, 2010, 2011, **2014**, 2016, 2017)
Denmark	Elite round Group 6 winners	8 April 2018	6 (2002, 2006, 2007, 2012, 2013, 2015)
Italy	Elite round Group 7 winners	8 April 2018	6 (2003, 2004, **2008**, 2010, 2011, 2017)

^{1} Bold indicates champions for that year. Italic indicates hosts for that year.

== Goalscorers ==
13 goals

- (Netherlands) Fenna Kalma

10 goals

- (France) Amelie Delabre

9 goals

- (Czech Republic) Andrea Stašková

8 goals

- (Finland) Jutta Rantala

7 goals

- (Italy) Agnese Bonfantini
- (Spain) Carla Bautista

6 goals

- (Belgium) Mariam Abdulai Toloba
- (Czech Republic) Michaela Dubcová
- (Germany) Anna-Lena Stolze
- (Italy) Sofia Cantore
- (Netherlands) Victoria Pelova
- (Netherlands) Joëlle Smits
- (Norway) Sophie Haug

5 goals

- (Czech Republic) Kamila Dubcová
- (Denmark) Sarah Jankovska
- (England) Ella Toone
- (France) Léa Khelifi
- (France) Jessy Roux
- (Hungary) Katalin Tímea Tolnai
- (Italy) Arianna Caruso
- (Norway) Andrea Norheim
- (Serbia) Allegra Poljak

4 goals

- (Denmark) Dajan Hashemi
- (Italy) Alice Regazzoli
- (Romania) Mădălina Boroș
- (Netherlands) Ashleigh Weerden
- (Spain) Damaris Egurrola
- (Spain) Rosa Márquez

3 goals

- (Belgium) Marie Minnaert
- (Denmark) Maria Hovmark
- (Denmark) Agnete Nielsen
- (Denmark) Janni Thomsen
- (England) Lauren Hemp
- (England) Jessica Ngunga
- (Finland) Emmaliina Tulkki
- (Finland) Roosa Tuominen
- (France) Clémentine Canon
- (Germany) Melissa Kössler
- (Germany) Paulina Krumbiegel
- (Germany) Lena Oberdorf
- (Hungary) Anna Júlia Csiki
- (Iceland) Hlín Eiríksdóttir
- (Iceland) Sólveig Jóhannesdóttir
- (Netherlands) Eva van Deursen
- (Netherlands) Noah Waterham
- (Poland) Roksana Ratajczyk
- (Portugal) Joana Martins
- (Serbia) Miljana Ivanović
- (Spain) Paula Fernández
- (Spain) Lucía Rodríguez
- (Sweden) Loreta Kullashi
- (Turkey) Ece Türkoğlu

2 goals

- (Austria) Magdalena Bachler
- (Austria) Melanie Brunnthaler
- (Belgium) Shari Van Belle
- (Czech Republic) Michaela Khýrová
- (Czech Republic) Kateřina Vojtková
- (Denmark) Mille Gejl
- (Denmark) Signe Holt Andersen
- (Denmark) Sofie Svava
- (England) Hannah Cain
- (England) Anna Filbey
- (Faroe Islands) Sarita Maria Mittfoss
- (Finland) Nea Nyrhinen
- (France) Lina Boussaha
- (France) Mickaélla Cardia
- (France) Ella Palis
- (Germany) Lisa Ebert
- (Germany) Lea Schneider
- (Hungary) Brigitta Pulins
- (Iceland) Bergdís Fanney Einarsdóttir
- (Italy) Benedetta Glionna
- (Israel) Shira Elinav
- (Netherlands) Williënne ter Beek
- (Netherlands) Kerstin Casparij
- (Netherlands) Bente Jansen
- (Norway) Noor Eckhoff
- (Norway) Camilla Linberg
- (Norway) Emilie Nautnes
- (Norway) Jenny Kristine Røsholm Olsen
- (Poland) Klaudia Miłek
- (Poland) Maja Osińska
- (Poland) Kasandra Parczewska
- (Portugal) Maria Inês
- (Portugal) Ines Torcato Macedo
- (Portugal) Constança Silva
- (Republic of Ireland) Carla McManus
- (Republic of Ireland) Saoirse Noonan
- (Republic of Ireland) Tiegan Ruddy
- (Russia) Milena Nikitina
- (Slovenia) Adrijana Mori
- (Spain) Teresa Abelleira
- (Spain) Olga Carmona
- (Sweden) Emma Engström
- (Sweden) Ebba Hed
- (Sweden) Paulina Nyström
- (Turkey) Kader Hançar
- (Ukraine) Nicole Kozlova
- (Ukraine) Nadiia Kunina
- (Wales) Daisy Evan-Watkins
- (Wales) Cassia Pike

1 goal

- (Austria) Julia Hickelsberger
- (Austria) Jennifer Klein
- (Austria) Maileen Mössner
- (Austria) Jana Scharnböck
- (Austria) Johanna Schneider
- (Austria) Laura Wienroither
- (Azerbaijan) Cagla Kanpara
- (Azerbaijan) Merve Ozdemir
- (Azerbaijan) Vusala Seyfatdinova
- (Belarus) Alina Lodyga
- (Belarus) Karina Olkhovik
- (Belgium) Kaily Dhondt
- (Belgium) Yenthe Kerckhofs
- (Belgium) Hanne Merkelbach
- (Belgium) Lisa Petry
- (Belgium) Tiffanie Vanderdonckt
- (Belgium) Ella Vierendeels
- (Bosnia and Herzegovina) Minela Gačanica
- (Bosnia and Herzegovina) Edina Habibović
- (Croatia) Helena Spajić
- (Cyprus) Chryso Michael
- (Czech Republic) Marie Bohatová
- (Czech Republic) Lucie Dudová
- (Czech Republic) Aneta Malatová
- (Czech Republic) Adéla Radová
- (Czech Republic) Kristýna Siváková
- (Czech Republic) Gabriela Šlajsová
- (Denmark) Karen Holmgaard
- (Denmark) Cecilie Johansen
- (England) Flo Allen
- (England) Bridget Galloway
- (England) Shania Hayles
- (England) Taylor Hinds
- (England) Lois Kathleen Joel
- (England) Jessica Jones
- (England) Esme Beth Morgan
- (England) Aimee Palmer
- (England) Bex Rayner
- (England) Grace Smith
- (Estonia) Hanna-Lisa Kuslap
- (Faroe Islands) Rebekka Fjallsá Benbakoura
- (Faroe Islands) Lea Hansen
- (Finland) Julia Haikonen
- (Finland) Sanni Ojanen
- (Finland) Emma Peuhkurinen
- (France) Oumy Stéphanie Bayo
- (France) Daïna Bourma
- (France) Maëlle Lakrar
- (France) Marion Rey
- (France) Nina Richard
- (Georgia (country)) Irina Khaburdzania
- (Germany) Gina-Maria Chmielinski
- (Germany) Christin Martina Meyer
- (Germany) Verena Wieder
- (Greece) Despoina Chatzinikolaou
- (Greece) Panagiota Papaioannou
- (Greece) Grigoria Pouliou
- (Hungary) Eszter Csigi
- (Hungary) Enikő Molnár
- (Hungary) Adrienn Oláh
- (Iceland) Kristín Dís Árnadóttir
- (Iceland) Anita Daníelsdóttir
- (Iceland) Ásdís Halldórsdóttir
- (Iceland) Stefanía Ragnarsdóttir
- (Israel) Neli Haj
- (Israel) Sarit Winstok
- (Italy) Sara Baldi
- (Italy) Isabel Cacciamali
- (Italy) Melanie Kuenrath
- (Italy) Beatrice Merlo
- (Italy) Elena Nichele
- (Italy) Elisa Polli
- (Italy) Erika Santoro
- (Kosovo) Jehona Shala
- (Latvia) Anastasija Fjodorova
- (Latvia) Karlīna Miksone
- (Lithuania) Paulina Potapova
- (Lithuania) Liucija Vaitukaitytė
- (North Macedonia) Ulza Maksuti
- (Montenegro) Maja Šaranović
- (Netherlands) Caitlin Dijkstra
- (Netherlands) Lisa Doorn
- (Netherlands) Lynn Wilms
- (Northern Ireland) Rebecca Bassett
- (Northern Ireland) Caitlyn Hamilton
- (Norway) Vilde Birkeli
- (Norway) Elin Åhgren Sørum
- (Norway) Olaug Tvedten
- (Poland) Dominika Gąsieniec
- (Poland) Nikola Karczewska
- (Poland) Joanna Olszewska
- (Poland) Anita Turkiewicz
- (Poland) Anna Zając
- (Poland) Marcjanna Zawadzka
- (Poland) Weronika Zawistowska
- (Poland) Maria Zbyrad
- (Portugal) Diva Meira
- (Republic of Ireland) Orla Casey
- (Republic of Ireland) Kate Mooney
- (Republic of Ireland) Lauryn O'Callaghan
- (Romania) Nicole Piperea
- (Romania) Georgiana Denisa Predoi
- (Russia) Kristina Cherkasova
- (Russia) Viktoriya Dubova
- (Russia) Yana Kuzmina
- (Russia) Polina Organova
- (Russia) Elena Shesterneva
- (Scotland) Lauren Davidson
- (Scotland) Samantha Kerr
- (Serbia) Tijana Filipović
- (Serbia) Andjela Frajtović
- (Serbia) Ivana Trbojević
- (Slovakia) Andrea Bogorová
- (Slovakia) Tamara Gmitterová
- (Slovakia) Mária Mikolajová
- (Slovakia) Martina Šurnovská
- (Slovenia) Sara Agrež
- (Slovenia) Maruša Česnik
- (Slovenia) Sara Makovec
- (Spain) Candela Andújar
- (Spain) Alejandra Serrano
- (Spain) Anna Torrodà
- (Sweden) Ariam-Berhane Gebreyohannes
- (Sweden) Nellie Lilja
- (Sweden) Agnes Nyberg
- (Turkey) Ayşe Şevval Ay
- (Turkey) Irem Eren
- (Wales) Gwennan Davies
- (Wales) Ella Powell
- (Wales) Bronwen Thomas
- (Wales) Amina Vine

1 own goal

- (Albania) Fabiola Mullaj (against Ukraine)
- (Armenia) Lena Andriasyan (against Scotland)
- (Armenia) Ani Karapetyan (against Turkey)
- (Austria) Laura Wienroither (against Spain)
- (Belarus) Alina Scherbo (against Sweden)
- (Bosnia and Herzegovina) Aldina Hamzić (against Serbia)
- (Croatia) Ivana Hrnjkaš (against Austria)
- (Czech Republic) Lucie Dudová (against Scotland)
- (Estonia) Siret Räämet (against Netherlands)
- (France) Léa Kergal (against Italy)
- (Kosovo) Leonora Ejupi (against Germany)
- (Montenegro) Ivana Čabarkapa (against Germany)
- (Montenegro) Maja Šaranović (against Germany)
- (Northern Ireland) Caitlyn Hamilton (against Norway)
- (Romania) Georgiana Dârle (against Slovakia)
- (Scotland) Amy Muir (against Hungary)
- (Slovakia) Diana Lemešová (against Germany)
- (Wales) Aimee Watson (against England)

Source: UEFA.com
