= 2018 UEFA Women's Under-19 Championship squads =

Player listing of women's football competition

The following is a list of squads for each national team competing at the 2018 UEFA Women's Under-19 Championship in Switzerland. Each national team had to submit a squad of 20 players born on or after 1 January 1999.

== Group A ==
=== Switzerland ===
Switzerland named their squad on 12 July 2018.

Head coach: Nora Häuptle

No.	Pos.	Player	Date of birth (age)	Club
1	GK	Elvira Herzog	5 March 2000 (aged 18)	(Swiss Football Association) FC Zürich
2	FW	Nadine Riesen	11 April 2000 (aged 18)	(Swiss Football Association) FC St. Gallen
3	DF	Victoria Bischof	23 April 2000 (aged 18)	(Swiss Football Association) FC St. Gallen
4	DF	Chantal Wyser	22 April 1999 (aged 19)	(Swiss Football Association) FC Luzern
5	DF	Kattalin Stahl	10 May 2001 (aged 17)	(Swiss Football Association) BSC Young Boys
6	MF	Malin Gut	1 August 2000 (aged 17)	(Swiss Football Association) FC Zürich
7	MF	Rahel Tschopp	30 May 2000 (aged 18)	(Swiss Football Association) FC Luzern
8	MF	Fiona Hubler	29 July 1999 (aged 18)	(Swiss Football Association) Grasshopper
9	DF	Alicia Haller	31 July 1999 (aged 18)	(Swiss Football Association) FC Luzern
10	FW	Alisha Lehmann	21 January 1999 (aged 19)	(Swiss Football Association) BSC Young Boys
11	DF	Tyara Buser	4 March 2000 (aged 18)	(Swiss Football Association) FC Basel
12	GK	Fiona Flühler	8 March 2000 (aged 18)	(Swiss Football Association) FC Zürich
13	MF	Lara Marti	21 September 1999 (aged 18)	(Swiss Football Association) FC Basel
14	FW	Géraldine Reuteler	21 April 1999 (aged 19)	(Swiss Football Association) FC Luzern
15	MF	Sabina Jackson	7 July 2000 (aged 18)	(Swiss Football Association) FC Zürich
16	MF	Chiara Messerli	15 January 2001 (aged 17)	(Swiss Football Association) BSC Young Boys
17	MF	Ilona Guede Redondo	22 July 2000 (aged 17)	(Swiss Football Association) BSC Young Boys
18	DF	Sina Hirschi	8 April 1999 (aged 19)	(Swiss Football Association) FC Basel
19	FW	Alissia Piperata	20 July 2000 (aged 17)	(Swiss Football Association) FC Zürich
20	DF	Seraina Piubel	2 June 2000 (aged 18)	(Swiss Football Association) FC Zürich

=== Norway ===
Norway named their squad on 27 June 2018.

Head coach: Nils Lexeröd

No.	Pos.	Player	Date of birth (age)	Club
1	GK	Linn-Mari Nilsen	24 February 1999 (aged 19)	(Norwegian Football Federation) Kaupanger
2	DF	Malin Sunde	15 July 2000 (aged 18)	(Norwegian Football Federation) Trondheims-Ørn
3	DF	Joanna Bækkelund	10 December 2000 (aged 17)	(Norwegian Football Federation) Lyn
4	DF	Camilla Huseby	12 April 1999 (aged 19)	(Norwegian Football Federation) Lyn
5	DF	Elise Stenevik	9 September 1999 (aged 18)	(Norwegian Football Federation) Arna-Bjørnar
6	MF	Andrea Norheim	30 January 1999 (aged 19)	(Swedish Football Association) Piteå
7	MF	Noor Eckhoff	6 December 1999 (aged 18)	(Norwegian Football Federation) Lyn
8	MF	Linn Huseby	12 April 1999 (aged 19)	(Norwegian Football Federation) Lyn
9	FW	Emilie Nautnes	13 January 1999 (aged 19)	(Norwegian Football Federation) Arna-Bjørnar
10	MF	Sophie Haug	4 June 1999 (aged 19)	(Norwegian Football Federation) LSK Kvinner
11	FW	Jenny Røsholm Olsen	18 March 2000 (aged 18)	(Norwegian Football Federation) Lyn
12	GK	Karen Sneve	21 February 2000 (aged 18)	(Norwegian Football Federation) KIL/Hemne
13	MF	Thea Bjelde	5 June 2000 (aged 18)	(Norwegian Football Federation) Arna-Bjørnar
14	FW	Elin Sørum	6 March 2000 (aged 18)	(Norwegian Football Federation) Trondheims-Ørn
15	FW	Olaug Tvedten	20 July 2000 (aged 17)	(Norwegian Football Federation) Avaldsnes
16	DF	Vilde Birkeli	7 October 2000 (aged 17)	(Norwegian Football Federation) Røa
17	DF	Emilie Woldvik	8 January 1999 (aged 19)	(Norwegian Football Federation) LSK Kvinner
18	DF	Sigrid Bloch-Hansen	24 April 1999 (aged 19)	(Norwegian Football Federation) Øvrevoll Hosle
19	MF	Elisabeth Terland	28 June 2001 (aged 17)	(Norwegian Football Federation) Klepp
20	FW	Runa Lillegård	26 February 2001 (aged 17)	(Norwegian Football Federation) Lyn

=== Spain ===
Spain named their squad on 6 July 2018.

Head coach: Jorge Vilda

No.	Pos.	Player	Date of birth (age)	Club
1	GK	María Echezarreta	19 July 2001 (aged 16)	(Royal Spanish Football Federation) Real Oviedo
2	DF	Oihane Hernández	4 May 2000 (aged 18)	(Royal Spanish Football Federation) Athletic Club
3	MF	Teresa Abelleira	9 January 2000 (aged 18)	(Royal Spanish Football Federation) Deportivo La Coruña
4	DF	Laia Codina	22 January 2000 (aged 18)	(Royal Spanish Football Federation) Barcelona B
5	DF	María Jiménez	17 September 2000 (aged 17)	(Royal Spanish Football Federation) Levante
6	MF	Anna Torrodà	21 January 2000 (aged 18)	(Royal Spanish Football Federation) Barcelona B
7	MF	Rosa Otermín	2 October 2000 (aged 17)	(Royal Spanish Football Federation) Atlético Madrid
8	FW	Athenea del Castillo	24 October 2000 (aged 17)	(Royal Spanish Football Federation) Racing de Santander
9	FW	Ana Marcos	9 July 2000 (aged 18)	(Royal Spanish Football Federation) Atlético Madrid
10	MF	Nerea Eizaguirre	4 January 2000 (aged 18)	(Royal Spanish Football Federation) Real Sociedad
11	MF	Olga Carmona	12 June 2000 (aged 18)	(Royal Spanish Football Federation) Sevilla
12	DF	Itziar Pinillos	21 September 2000 (aged 17)	(Royal Spanish Football Federation) Atlético Madrid
13	GK	Malena Mieres	29 March 2000 (aged 18)	(Royal Spanish Football Federation) Deportivo La Coruña
14	DF	Natalia Ramos	10 February 1999 (aged 19)	(Royal Spanish Football Federation) Levante
15	MF	Elena Julve	8 December 2000 (aged 17)	(Royal Spanish Football Federation) Espanyol
16	MF	María Llompart	19 October 2000 (aged 17)	(Royal Spanish Football Federation) Espanyol
17	MF	Rosa Márquez	22 December 2000 (aged 17)	(Royal Spanish Football Federation) Real Betis
18	MF	Yasmin Mrabet	8 August 1999 (aged 18)	(Royal Spanish Football Federation) Madrid CFF
19	FW	Carla Bautista	14 March 2000 (aged 18)	(Royal Spanish Football Federation) Atlético Madrid
20	DF	Alejandra Serrano	28 August 2000 (aged 17)	(Royal Spanish Football Federation) Valencia

=== France ===
France named their squad on 15 July 2018.

Head coach: Gaëlle Dumas

No.	Pos.	Player	Date of birth (age)	Club
1	GK	Justine Lerond	29 February 2000 (aged 18)	(French Football Federation) FC Metz
2	DF	Laurène Martin	8 August 2000 (aged 17)	(French Football Federation) ESOF La Roche-sur-Yon
3	DF	Daïna Bourma	24 December 1999 (aged 18)	(French Football Federation) Montpellier HSC
4	DF	Léa Kergal	19 June 1999 (aged 19)	(French Football Federation) PSG
5	DF	Célia Rigaud	6 July 1999 (aged 19)	(French Football Federation) FC Metz
6	MF	Ella Palis	24 March 1999 (aged 19)	(French Football Federation) En Avant de Guingamp
7	FW	Kelly Gago	5 April 1999 (aged 19)	(French Football Federation) AS Saint-Étienne
8	MF	Laura Rueda	9 July 1999 (aged 19)	(French Football Federation) ESOF La Roche-sur-Yon
9	FW	Mathilde Bourdieu	15 April 1999 (aged 19)	(French Football Federation) Paris
10	MF	Léa Khelifi	12 May 1999 (aged 19)	(French Football Federation) FC Metz
11	MF	Lina Boussaha	16 January 1999 (aged 19)	(French Football Federation) PSG
12	FW	Jessy Roux	30 March 2000 (aged 18)	(French Football Federation) Olympique Lyonnais
13	DF	Mathilde Kack	26 March 2000 (aged 18)	(French Football Federation) Reims FF
14	DF	Romane Enguehard	5 July 1999 (aged 19)	(French Football Federation) US Saint-Malo
15	DF	Océane Deslandes	26 July 2000 (aged 17)	(French Football Federation) Reims FF
16	GK	Louise Thiery	10 September 2000 (aged 17)	(French Football Federation) US Saint-Malo
17	FW	Lorena Azzaro	22 October 2000 (aged 17)	(French Football Federation) Olympique Lyonnais
18	MF	Clémentine Canon	6 April 1999 (aged 19)	(French Football Federation) ASJ Soyaux
19	DF	Oumy Bayo	7 December 1999 (aged 18)	(French Football Federation) ASPTT Albi
20	MF	Eva Kouache	7 January 2000 (aged 18)	(French Football Federation) Olympique Lyonnais

== Group B ==
=== Netherlands ===
Netherlands named their squad on 7 July 2018.

Head coach: Jessica Torny

No.	Pos.	Player	Date of birth (age)	Club
1	GK	Daphne van Domselaar	6 March 2000 (aged 18)	(Royal Dutch Football Association) FC Twente
2	DF	Lynn Wilms	3 October 2000 (aged 17)	(Royal Dutch Football Association) FC Twente
3	DF	Licia Darnoud	9 June 2000 (aged 18)	(Royal Dutch Football Association) FC Twente
4	DF	Jamie Altelaar	6 April 1999 (aged 19)	(Royal Dutch Football Association) VV Alkmaar
5	MF	Janou Levels	30 October 2000 (aged 17)	(Royal Dutch Football Association) PSV
6	MF	Kerstin Casparij	19 August 2000 (aged 17)	(Royal Dutch Football Association) SC Heerenveen
7	FW	Nance van der Meer	3 October 1999 (aged 18)	(Royal Dutch Football Association) ADO Den Haag
8	MF	Marisa Olislagers	9 September 2000 (aged 17)	(Royal Dutch Football Association) ADO Den Haag
9	FW	Rebecca Doejaaren	29 January 1999 (aged 19)	(Royal Dutch Football Association) PEC Zwolle
10	MF	Kayleigh van Dooren	31 July 1999 (aged 18)	(Royal Dutch Football Association) PSV
11	FW	Jolina Amani	26 August 1999 (aged 18)	(Royal Dutch Football Association) Excelsior Barendrecht
12	MF	Jeslin Niens	5 October 1999 (aged 18)	(Royal Dutch Football Association) PEC Zwolle
13	DF	Shanel Smid	30 October 1999 (aged 18)	(Royal Dutch Football Association) PEC Zwolle
14	MF	Romy Speelman	24 October 2000 (aged 17)	(Royal Dutch Football Association) ADO Den Haag
15	DF	Daphne Nierop	24 February 1999 (aged 19)	(Royal Dutch Football Association) VV Alkmaar
16	GK	Aukje van Seijst	10 December 2000 (aged 17)	(Royal Dutch Football Association) AFC Ajax
17	MF	Kelsey Geraedts	13 August 2000 (aged 17)	(German Football Association) Borussia Mönchengladbach
18	FW	Emma van der Vorst	2 November 1999 (aged 18)	(Royal Dutch Football Association) CTO Amsterdam
19	FW	Sophie Cobussen	27 January 1999 (aged 19)	(Royal Dutch Football Association) Achilles '29
20	MF	Dayna Schra	12 March 1999 (aged 19)	(Royal Dutch Football Association) SC Heerenveen

=== Denmark ===
The squad was announced on 20 June 2018.

Head coach: Søren Randa-Boldt

No.	Pos.	Player	Date of birth (age)	Caps	Goals	Club
1	GK	Lene Christensen	4 February 2000 (aged 18)	5	0	(Danish Football Association) KoldingQ
2	DF	Caroline Pleidrup	11 December 2000 (aged 17)	6	1	(Danish Football Association) Brøndby IF
3	DF	Emma Færge	6 December 2000 (aged 17)	6	0	(Danish Football Association) Vildbjerg SF
4	MF	Lærke Tingleff	26 May 1999 (aged 19)	3	0	(Danish Football Association) Brøndby IF
5	DF	Sofie Emma Riis	20 March 1999 (aged 19)	4	0	(Danish Football Association) KoldingQ
6	MF	Kamilla Karlsen (c)	7 May 2000 (aged 18)	11	0	(Danish Football Association) Brøndby IF
7	MF	Sofie Svava	11 August 2000 (aged 17)	12	5	(Danish Football Association) Brøndby IF
8	MF	Sarah Jankovska	13 August 1999 (aged 18)	22	6	(Danish Football Association) BSF
9	FW	Maria Hovmark	11 May 1999 (aged 19)	10	9	(Danish Football Association) Brøndby IF
10	MF	Mille Gejl	23 September 1999 (aged 18)	18	6	(Danish Football Association) KoldingQ
11	MF	Signe Holt Andersen	28 August 1999 (aged 18)	14	7	(Danish Football Association) VSK Aarhus
12	DF	Matilde Lundorf	19 January 1999 (aged 19)	21	0	(Danish Football Association) VSK Aarhus
13	MF	Olivia Holdt	7 June 2001 (aged 17)	0	0	(Danish Football Association) Vildbjerg SF
14	FW	Lise Dissing	10 December 2001 (aged 16)	0	0	(Danish Football Association) Vildbjerg SF
15	MF	Emma Snerle	23 March 2001 (aged 17)	0	0	(Danish Football Association) Fortuna Hjørring
16	GK	Laura Frederikke Nielsen	28 October 2001 (aged 16)	0	0	(Danish Football Association) OdenseQ
17	FW	Dajan Hashemi	21 November 2000 (aged 17)	10	6	(Danish Football Association) BSF
18	DF	Sara Holmgaard	28 January 1999 (aged 19)	22	0	(Danish Football Association) Fortuna Hjørring
19	FW	Cecilie Winther Johansen	14 June 2000 (aged 18)	8	3	(Danish Football Association) Vildbjerg SF
20	MF	Janni Thomsen	16 February 2000 (aged 18)	5	3	(Danish Football Association) VSK Aarhus

=== Germany ===
Germany named their squad on 14 July 2018.

Head coach: Maren Meinert

No.	Pos.	Player	Date of birth (age)	Club
1	GK	Stina Johannes	23 January 2000 (aged 18)	(German Football Association) SGS Essen
2	DF	Fatma Sakar	26 March 1999 (aged 19)	(German Football Association) TSG Hoffenheim
3	DF	Meret Wittje	10 July 1999 (aged 19)	(German Football Association) VfL Wolfsburg
4	DF	Lara Schmidt	21 July 2000 (aged 17)	(German Football Association) USV Jena
5	DF	Maren Tellenbröker	15 October 2000 (aged 17)	(German Football Association) USV Jena
6	MF	Sydney Lohmann	19 June 2000 (aged 18)	(German Football Association) Bayern Munich
7	FW	Melissa Kössler	4 March 2000 (aged 18)	(German Football Association) Turbine Potsdam
8	MF	Lisa Ebert	6 July 2000 (aged 18)	(German Football Association) 1. FFC Frankfurt
9	FW	Anna-Lena Stolze	8 July 2000 (aged 18)	(German Football Association) VfL Wolfsburg
10	FW	Nicole Anyomi	10 February 2000 (aged 18)	(German Football Association) SGS Essen
11	MF	Gina Chmielinski	7 June 2000 (aged 18)	(German Football Association) Turbine Potsdam
12	GK	Lisa Klostermann	28 May 1999 (aged 19)	(German Football Association) SGS Essen
13	DF	Verena Wieder	26 June 2000 (aged 18)	(German Football Association) Bayern Munich
14	MF	Paulina Krumbiegel	27 October 2000 (aged 17)	(German Football Association) TSG Hoffenheim
15	DF	Lisann Kaut	24 August 2000 (aged 17)	(German Football Association) FSV Hessen Wetzlar
16	DF	Noemi Gentile	24 April 2000 (aged 18)	(German Football Association) SC Freiburg
17	MF	Lena Uebach	31 July 2000 (aged 17)	(German Football Association) Bayer Leverkusen
18	FW	Christin Meyer	14 October 2000 (aged 17)	(German Football Association) SV Henstedt-Ulzburg
19	DF	Lara Schenk	20 January 2000 (aged 18)	(United States Soccer Federation) Harvard Crimson
20	MF	Marie Müller	25 July 2000 (aged 17)	(German Football Association) SC Freiburg

=== Italy ===
Italy named their squad on 16 July 2018.

Head coach: Enrico Sbardella

No.	Pos.	Player	Date of birth (age)	Club
1	GK	Nicole Lauria	24 December 1999 (aged 18)	(Italian Football Federation) Bologna
2	DF	Vanessa Panzeri	22 June 2000 (aged 18)	(Italian Football Federation) Como
3	DF	Beatrice Merlo	23 February 1999 (aged 19)	(Italian Football Federation) Internazionale
4	MF	Angelica Soffia	2 July 2000 (aged 18)	(Italian Football Federation) Verona
5	DF	Maria Luisa Filangeri	28 January 2000 (aged 18)	(Italian Football Federation) ASD Nebrodi
6	DF	Tecla Pettenuzzo	30 November 1999 (aged 18)	(Italian Football Federation) Padova
7	MF	Arianna Caruso	6 November 1999 (aged 18)	(Italian Football Federation) Juventus
8	MF	Alice Regazzoli	15 March 1999 (aged 19)	(Italian Football Federation) Internazionale
9	FW	Elisa Polli	27 August 2000 (aged 17)	(Italian Football Federation) Jesina
10	FW	Agnese Bonfantini	4 July 1999 (aged 19)	(Italian Football Federation) Internazionale
11	FW	Sara Baldi	13 April 2000 (aged 18)	(Italian Football Federation) Mozzanica
12	GK	Roberta Aprile	22 November 2000 (aged 17)	(Italian Football Federation) Pink Sport Time
13	DF	Camilla Labate	2 May 1999 (aged 19)	(Italian Football Federation) Res Roma
14	MF	Bianca Bardin	7 February 2000 (aged 18)	(Italian Football Federation) Verona
15	MF	Elena Nichele	12 January 2000 (aged 18)	(Italian Football Federation) Verona
16	DF	Irene Santi	8 October 1999 (aged 18)	(Italian Football Federation) Internazionale
17	DF	Erika Santoro	3 September 1999 (aged 18)	(Italian Football Federation) San Zaccaria FC
18	FW	Benedetta Glionna	26 July 1999 (aged 18)	(Italian Football Federation) Fiammamonza
19	MF	Giada Greggi	18 February 2000 (aged 18)	(Italian Football Federation) Res Roma
20	FW	Melanie Kuenrath	25 July 2000 (aged 17)	(German Football Association) Bayern Munich
