= Čabarkapa =

Čabarkapa (Serbian Cyrillic: Чабаркапа) is a Serbo-Croatian surname, derived from a nickname meaning "bucket-cap" or "tub-cap". It is borne by ethnic Serbs. It may refer to:

- Ivana Čabarkapa (born 1999), Montenegrin footballer
- Žarko Čabarkapa (born 1981), Serbian basketballer
