= 2018 UEFA Women's Under-19 Championship =

U-19-Fußball-Europameisterschaft der Frauen 2018 Championnat d'Europe féminin de football des moins de 19 ans 2018 Campionato europeo femminile Under-19 di calcio 2018

Tournament details
- Host country: Switzerland
- Dates: 18–30 July
- Teams: 8 (from 1 confederation)
- Venues: 4 (in 4 host cities)

Final positions
- Champions: Spain (3rd title)
- Runners-up: Germany

Tournament statistics
- Matches played: 15
- Goals scored: 33 (2.2 per match)
- Top scorer(s): (Denmark) Dajan Hashemi (Germany) Paulina Krumbiegel (Netherlands) Lynn Wilms (Norway) Andrea Norheim (Spain) Olga Carmona (Switzerland) Alisha Lehmann (Switzerland) Géraldine Reuteler (2 goals each)

The 2018 UEFA Women's Under-19 Championship (also known as UEFA Women's Under-19 Euro 2018) was the 17th edition of the UEFA Women's Under-19 Championship (21st edition if the Under-18 era is included), the annual international youth football championship organised by UEFA for the women's under-19 national teams of Europe. Switzerland, which were selected by UEFA on 26 January 2015, hosted the tournament, which took place between 18 and 30 July 2018.

A total of eight teams played in the tournament, with players born on or after 1 January 1999 eligible to participate.

Spain were the defending champions, and successfully defended the title after beating Germany in the final, and became the first nation to win the women's under-17 and under-19 titles in the same year.

== Qualification ==
A total of 49 UEFA nations entered the competition (including Kosovo who entered a competitive women's national team tournament for the first time), and with the hosts Switzerland qualifying automatically, the other 48 teams competed in the qualifying competition to determine the remaining seven spots in the final tournament. The qualifying competition consisted of two rounds: Qualifying round, which took place in autumn 2017, and Elite round, which took place in spring 2018.

=== Qualified teams ===
The following teams qualified for the final tournament.

Note: All appearance statistics include only U-19 era (since 2002).

Team	Method of qualification	Appearance	Last appearance	Previous best performance
Switzerland	Hosts	8th	2016 (semi-finals)	Semi-finals (2009, 2011)
Norway	Elite round Group 1 winners	12th	2016 (group stage)	Runners-up (2003, 2008, 2011)
Germany	Elite round Group 2 winners	15th	2017 (semi-finals)	Champions (2002, 2006, 2007, 2011)
France	Elite round Group 3 winners	14th	2017 (runners-up)	Champions (2003, 2010, 2013, 2016)
Spain	Elite round Group 4 winners	13th	2017 (champions)	Champions (2004, 2017)
Netherlands	Elite round Group 5 winners	8th	2017 (semi-finals)	Champions (2014)
Denmark	Elite round Group 6 winners	7th	2015 (group stage)	Semi-finals (2002, 2006, 2012)
Italy	Elite round Group 7 winners	7th	2017 (group stage)	Champions (2008)

=== Final draw ===
The final draw was held on 23 April 2018, 18:00 CEST (UTC+2), at the Stufenbau in Ittigen, Switzerland. The eight teams (including the Elite round Group 1 winners whose identity was known at the time of the draw) were drawn into two groups of four teams. There was no seeding, except that hosts Switzerland were assigned to position A1 in the draw.

== Venues ==
The eight teams were divided into two groups of four, a group West (Biel/Bienne, Yverdon-les-Bains) and a group East (Wohlen, Zug).

Yverdon-les-Bains	Biel/Bienne	2018 UEFA Women's Under-19 Championship is located in Switzerland	Wohlen	Zug
Stade Municipal	Tissot Arena	2018 UEFA Women's Under-19 Championship is located in Switzerland	Stadion Niedermatten	Herti Allmend Stadion
Capacity: 5,165	Capacity: 5,200	2018 UEFA Women's Under-19 Championship is located in Switzerland	Capacity: 3,616	Capacity: 4,707

== Match officials ==
A total of 6 referees, 8 assistant referees and 2 fourth officials were appointed for the final tournament.

Referees

- (Croatia) Ivana Martinčić
- (England) Rebecca Welch
- (Greece) Eleni Antoniou
- (Sweden) Tess Olofsson
- (Turkey) Melis Özçiğdem
- (Wales) Cheryl Foster

Assistant referees

- (Azerbaijan) Khayala Azizzade
- (Belarus) Hanna Ilyankova
- (Czech Republic) Nikola Šafránková
- (Finland) Jenni Mahlamäki
- (Israel) May Moalem
- (North Macedonia) Elena Soklevska Ilievski
- (Russia) Iana Eleferenko
- (Serbia) Jasmina Zafirović

Fourth officials

- (Germany) Angelika Soeder
- (Switzerland) Sandra Strub

== Squads ==
Each national team have to submit a squad of 20 players (Regulations Article 41).

== Group stage ==
The final tournament schedule was confirmed on 30 April 2018.

The group winners and runners-up advance to the semi-finals.

Tiebreakers

In the group stage, teams are ranked according to points (3 points for a win, 1 point for a draw, 0 points for a loss), and if tied on points, the following tiebreaking criteria are applied, in the order given, to determine the rankings (Regulations Articles 17.01 and 17.02):

1. Points in head-to-head matches among tied teams;
2. Goal difference in head-to-head matches among tied teams;
3. Goals scored in head-to-head matches among tied teams;
4. If more than two teams are tied, and after applying all head-to-head criteria above, a subset of teams are still tied, all head-to-head criteria above are reapplied exclusively to this subset of teams;
5. Goal difference in all group matches;
6. Goals scored in all group matches;
7. Penalty shoot-out if only two teams have the same number of points, and they met in the last round of the group and are tied after applying all criteria above (not used if more than two teams have the same number of points, or if their rankings are not relevant for qualification for the next stage);
8. Disciplinary points (red card = 3 points, yellow card = 1 point, expulsion for two yellow cards in one match = 3 points);
9. UEFA coefficient for the qualifying round draw;
10. Drawing of lots.

All times are local, CEST (UTC+2).

=== Group A ===
Pos	Team	Pld	W	D	L	GF	GA	GD	Pts	Qualification
1	Norway	3	2	0	1	4	3	+1	6 (Note: Head-to-head result: Spain 0–2 Norway.)	Knockout stage
2	Spain	3	2	0	1	4	3	+1	6	Knockout stage
3	Switzerland (H)	3	1	1	1	5	5	0	4	
4	France	3	0	1	2	3	5	−2	1	

Source: UEFA
Rules for classification: Group stage tiebreakers
(H) Hosts
Notes:
18 July 2018
15:00

Spain	0–2	Norway
	Report	Norheim 31', 37' (pen.)

Stadion Niedermatten, Wohlen
Referee: Cheryl Foster (Wales)
18 July 2018
18:15

Switzerland	2–2	France
Wyser 70'; Lehmann 80'	Report	Boussaha 15' (pen.); Palis 67'

Stadion Niedermatten, Wohlen
Referee: Ivana Martinčić (Croatia)

21 July 2018
15:00

Norway	1–0	France
Haug 43'	Report

Herti Allmend Stadion, Zug
Referee: Tess Olofsson (Sweden)
21 July 2018
18:15

Switzerland	0–2	Spain
	Report	Carmona 29'; Márquez 60'

Herti Allmend Stadion, Zug
Referee: Eleni Antoniou (Greece)

24 July 2018
18:15

Norway	1–3	Switzerland
Lillegård 79'	Report	Reuteler 7', 49'; Lehmann 90'

Stadion Niedermatten, Wohlen
Referee: Rebecca Welch (England)
24 July 2018
18:15

France	1–2	Spain
Roux 80'	Report	Del Castillo 68'; Carmona 83'

Herti Allmend Stadion, Zug
Referee: Meliz Özçiğdem (Turkey)

=== Group B ===
Pos	Team	Pld	W	D	L	GF	GA	GD	Pts	Qualification
1	Denmark	3	2	0	1	4	2	+2	6 (Note: Tied on head-to-head points. Head-to-head goal difference: Denmark +1, Germany 0, Netherlands: −1)	Knockout stage
2	Germany	3	2	0	1	3	1	+2	6	Knockout stage
3	Netherlands	3	2	0	1	5	4	+1	6	
4	Italy	3	0	0	3	1	6	−5	0	

Source: UEFA
Rules for classification: Group stage tiebreakers
Notes:
18 July 2018
15:00

Germany	1–0	Denmark
Krumbiegel 54'	Report

Tissot Arena, Biel/Bienne
Referee: Melis Özçiğdem (Turkey)
18 July 2018
18:15

Netherlands	3–1	Italy
Wilms 12', 17' (pen.); Van der Meer 30'	Report	Caruso 56'

Tissot Arena, Biel/Bienne
Referee: Tess Olofsson (Sweden)

21 July 2018
15:00

Denmark	1–0	Italy
Holmgaard 73'	Report

Stade Municipal, Yverdon-les-Bains
Referee: Rebecca Welch (England)
21 July 2018
18:15

Netherlands	1–0	Germany
Doejaaren 72'	Report

Stade Municipal, Yverdon-les-Bains
Referee: Ivana Martinčić (Croatia)

24 July 2018
18:15

Denmark	3–1	Netherlands
Hashemi 8', 20'; Thomsen 51'	Report	Van Dooren 16'

Tissot Arena, Biel/Bienne
Referee: Cheryl Foster (Wales)
24 July 2018
18:15

Italy	0–2	Germany
	Report	Anyomi 36'; Krumbiegel 85'

Stade Municipal, Yverdon-les-Bains
Referee: Eleni Antoniou (Greece)

== Knockout stage ==
In the knockout stage, extra time and penalty shoot-out are used to decide the winner if necessary.

=== Bracket ===
Semi-finals
27 July – Biel/Bienne
Norway	0
Germany	2
27 July – Biel/Bienne
Denmark	0
Spain	1

Final
30 July – Biel/Bienne
Germany	0
Spain	1

=== Semi-finals ===
27 July 2018
14:00

Norway	0–2	Germany
	Report	Kössler 45'; Stolze 47'

Tissot Arena, Biel/Bienne
Referee: Eleni Antoniou (Greece)

27 July 2018
18:15

Denmark	0–1	Spain
	Report	Abelleira 68'

Tissot Arena, Biel/Bienne
Referee: Rebecca Welch (England)

=== Final ===
30 July 2018
18:15

Germany	0–1	Spain
	Report	Llompart 80'

Tissot Arena, Biel/Bienne
Referee: Ivana Martinčić (Croatia)

== Goalscorers ==
There were 33 goals scored in 15 matches, for an average of 2.2 goals per match.

2 goals

- (Denmark) Dajan Hashemi
- (Germany) Paulina Krumbiegel
- (Netherlands) Lynn Wilms
- (Norway) Andrea Norheim
- (Spain) Olga Carmona
- (Switzerland) Alisha Lehmann
- (Switzerland) Géraldine Reuteler

1 goal

- (Denmark) Sara Holmgaard
- (Denmark) Janni Thomsen
- (France) Lina Boussaha
- (France) Ella Palis
- (France) Jessy Roux
- (Germany) Nicole Anyomi
- (Germany) Melissa Kössler
- (Germany) Anna-Lena Stolze
- (Italy) Arianna Caruso
- (Netherlands) Rebecca Doejaaren
- (Netherlands) Nance van der Meer
- (Netherlands) Kayleigh van Dooren
- (Norway) Sophie Haug
- (Norway) Runa Lillegård
- (Spain) Teresa Abelleira
- (Spain) Athenea del Castillo
- (Spain) María Llompart
- (Spain) Rosa Márquez
- (Switzerland) Chantal Wyser

Source: UEFA.com

== Team of the tournament ==
The UEFA technical observers selected the following 11 players for the team of the tournament (and an additional nine substitutes):

Starting XI:

Goalkeeper

- (Spain) María Echezarreta

Defenders

- (Spain) Anna Torrodà
- (Denmark) Sofie Svava
- (Germany) Lisa Ebert
- (Italy) Vanessa Panzeri

Midfielders

- (Germany) Sydney Lohmann
- (Spain) Rosa Márquez
- (Denmark) Sarah Jankovska
- (Switzerland) Géraldine Reuteler

Forwards

- (Spain) Olga Carmona
- (Germany) Paulina Krumbiegel

Substitutes:

Goalkeeper

- (Denmark) Lene Christensen

Defenders

- (Denmark) Sara Holmgaard
- (Norway) Joanna Bækkelund
- (Switzerland) Malin Gut

Midfielders

- (Netherlands) Marisa Olislagers
- (Spain) Teresa Abelleira
- (Italy) Benedetta Glionna

Forwards

- (France) Kelly Gago
- (Norway) Sophie Haug
