= Shira Elinav =

Israeli footballer

Personal information
- Full name: שירה אלינב
- Date of birth: 26 April 2000 (age 26)
- Place of birth: Jerusalem, Israel
- Height: 5 ft 6 in (1.68 m)
- Position: Forward

Team information
- Current team: Hapoel Katamon Jerusalem
- Number: 18

Youth career
- 2012–2013: Maccabi Tel Aviv (boys)
- 2013: Girls Youth Academy
- 2013–2015: Hapoel Petah Tikva
- 2015–2019: Girls Youth Academy

College career
Years	Team	Apps	(Gls)
2020–2023	Kansas Jayhawks	59	(13)
2024	Santa Clara Broncos	15	(1)

Senior career*
Years	Team	Apps	(Gls)
2016–2019	Girls Youth Academy	52	(20)
2019	ASA Tel Aviv	3	(3)
2019–2020	Ramat HaSharon	13	(8)
2024–	Hapoel Katamon Jerusalem	39	(16)

International career^{‡}
2015–2016	Israel U16	6	(6)
2017–2018	Israel U19	9	(4)
2019–	Israel	25	(4)
- * Club domestic league appearances and goals as of 2 November 2026 ‡ National team caps and goals as of 3 November 2026

Shira Elinav (Hebrew: שירה אלינב; born 26 April 2000) is an Israeli footballer who plays as a forward for Hapoel Katamon Jerusalem and for the Israel women's national team. She has previously played in Israel for the Girls Youth Academy, ASA Tel Aviv, and Ramat HaSharon and in the United States college system for Kansas Jayhawks and Santa Clara Broncos.

== Club career ==
=== Youth ===
Elinav grew up playing football with boys in the neighbourhood, but started playing seriously when she moved to the United States when she was 9. She played three years in Connecticut before returning to Israel and playing one year with Maccabi Tel Aviv's boys team. After that, she played one year with Hapoel Petah Tikva's girls team before joining the Girls Youth Academy for five years. Elinav played one season for Ramat HaSharon, in which they won the Ligat Nashim, before moving to the United States for college.

=== Hapoel Katamon Jerusalem ===
In January 2025, Elinav returned to Israel, signing a one-and-a-half season contract with Hapoel Katamon Jerusalem, a club she was fan of since she was a young girl. Elinav returned to Israel partly due to the effect of the October 7 attacks. She described the adjustment back to Israeli football not easy due to the rules being different in the American college system as well as a faster and more physical game. Elinav scored 11 goals and 13 assists in the 2025–26 Ligat Nashim season, helping the club win the league title, leading to her signing a contract extension with the club in June 2026.

== College career ==
In April 2020, Elinav joined Kansas Jayhawks on a four-year contract, during which she studied for a bachelor's degree at the University of Kansas. Following an initial video, the coach, Mark Francis Friday, flew to Tel Aviv to watch her play live. Elinav scored her debut goal in March 2020 against Kansas State Wildcats, and was selected for the 2020 Academic All-Big 12 Rookie Team. In her third year at Kansas, Elinav had her best season, finishing as the team's top scorer with 8 goals and 4 assists. She was selected for the Academic All-Big 12 First Team for three consecutive years in 2021, 2022, and 2023.

In June 2024, Elinav joined Santa Clara Broncos for a fifth year in the American college system. She scored one goal in 15 appearances in her season at Santa Clara.

== International career ==
Elinav represented Israel at youth international level for five years, playing for the under-16 and under-19 teams. She represented the under-16 team in UEFA Development Tournaments in 2015 and 2016. She represented the under-19 team in the 2018 UEFA Under-19 Championship qualifiers and the 2019 UEFA Under-19 Championship qualifiers, scoring two goals in each.

Elinav was called up by Gabriel Burstein to the Israel senior national team in 2019 for the Euro 2022 qualifiers. She made her debut in the first match of the campaign, a 2–3 loss to Italy. She scored her first senior international goal later in the campaign, in a 4–0 victory over Georgia in March 2020.

== Style of play ==
Elinav plays as a forward or winger, preferring the final third of the field. Her speed and one-on-one mentality make her a threat to opposing defenders. During her time in the United States with Kansas Jayhawks, she transitioned from playing mostly on the wing to a central striker role. Elinav has mentioned looking up to Cristiano Ronaldo and Kylian Mbappé, citing their hard work, finishing ability, and creativity.

== Personal life ==
Elinav was born in Jerusalem and raised in Mazkeret Batya, together with a twin brother and younger sister. She served in the Israel Defense Forces from 2018 to 2020 and majored in biology. After her return to Israel, she started studying veterinary medicine at the Hebrew University's Koret School of Veterinary Medicine in October 2025.

== International goals ==
No.	Date	Venue	Opponent	Score	Result	Competition
1.	10 March 2020	Haberfeld Stadium, Rishon LeZion, Israel	Georgia	1–0	4–0	UEFA Women's Euro 2022 qualifying
2.	13 April 2022	HaMoshava Stadium, Petah Tikva, Israel	Turkey	1–0	1–0	2023 FIFA Women's World Cup qualification
3.	5 December 2023	Globall Football Park, Telki, Hungary	Estonia	2–0	4–1	2023–24 UEFA Women's Nations League C
4.	16 July 2024	Budaörsi Városi Stadium, Budaörs, Hungary	Slovakia	2–1	2–2	UEFA Women's Euro 2025 qualifying
