= Joana Martins =

Portuguese footballer

Personal information
- Full name: Joana David Carromeu Martins
- Date of birth: 4 October 2000 (age 26)
- Place of birth: Sesimbra, Portugal
- Height: 1.54 m (5 ft 1 in)
- Position: Midfielder

Team information
- Current team: Sporting CP
- Number: 7

Senior career*
Years	Team	Apps	(Gls)
2017–	Sporting CP	111	(17)

International career^{‡}
2016	Portugal U16	5	(2)
2015–2017	Portugal U17	15	(2)
2017–2019	Portugal U19	21	(7)
2021–	Portugal U23	9	(1)
2019–	Portugal	8	(0)
- * Club domestic league appearances and goals as of 20 June 2025 ‡ National team caps and goals as of 20 June 2025

Joana Martins (born 4 October 2000) is a Portuguese professional footballer, who plays as a midfielder for Sporting CP and the Portugal national team.

== Club career ==
Martins signed a professional contract with Sporting CP on 23 June 2017, at the age of 16. In the 2018–19 season, Martins played games for the youth, B and senior teams of Sporting. Towards the end of the season, however, she secured her place in the senior team and started in the final three league fixtures. On 24 June 2021, she signed a one-year contract extension with Sporting, committing herself to a sixth season with the club.

== International career ==
Martins made her debut for the Portugal national team on 20 January 2019 against Ukraine.

== Honours ==
Sporting

- Campeonato Nacional: 2016–17, 2017–18
- Taça de Portugal: 2016–17, 2017–18, 2021–22
- Supertaça de Portugal: 2017, 2021, 2024
