= Nina Richard =

French footballer (born 2000)

Personal information
- Full name: Nina Gwenael Richard
- Date of birth: 6 September 2000 (age 26)
- Place of birth: Saint-Jean-de-Braye, France
- Height: 1.59 m (5 ft 3 in)
- Position: Midfielder

Team information
- Current team: FC Sion
- Number: 45

Youth career
- 2006–2013: COS Marcilly-en-Villette
- 2013–2014: ASPTT Orléans
- 2014–2015: CMPS Jules-Ferry Fleury
- 2015–2017: Orléans

Senior career*
Years	Team	Apps	(Gls)
2017–2020	Orléans	27	(4)
2020–2021	VGA Saint-Maur	6	(1)
2021–2024	Guingamp	60	(2)
2024–2025	UD Tenerife	8	(1)
2026-	FC Sion		

International career
2016	France U16	2	(0)
2017–2018	France U19	5	(1)
- * Club domestic league appearances and goals as of 14 December 2024

Nina Gwenael Richard (born 6 September 2000) is a French semi professional footballer who plays as a midfielder or striker for LNB ( seconde division of switzerland)club FC Sion . Richard has previously played for En Avant Guingamp. in french First division.

she played in under 16 ans under 19 french team.
