= Carla Bautista =

Spanish footballer (born 2000)

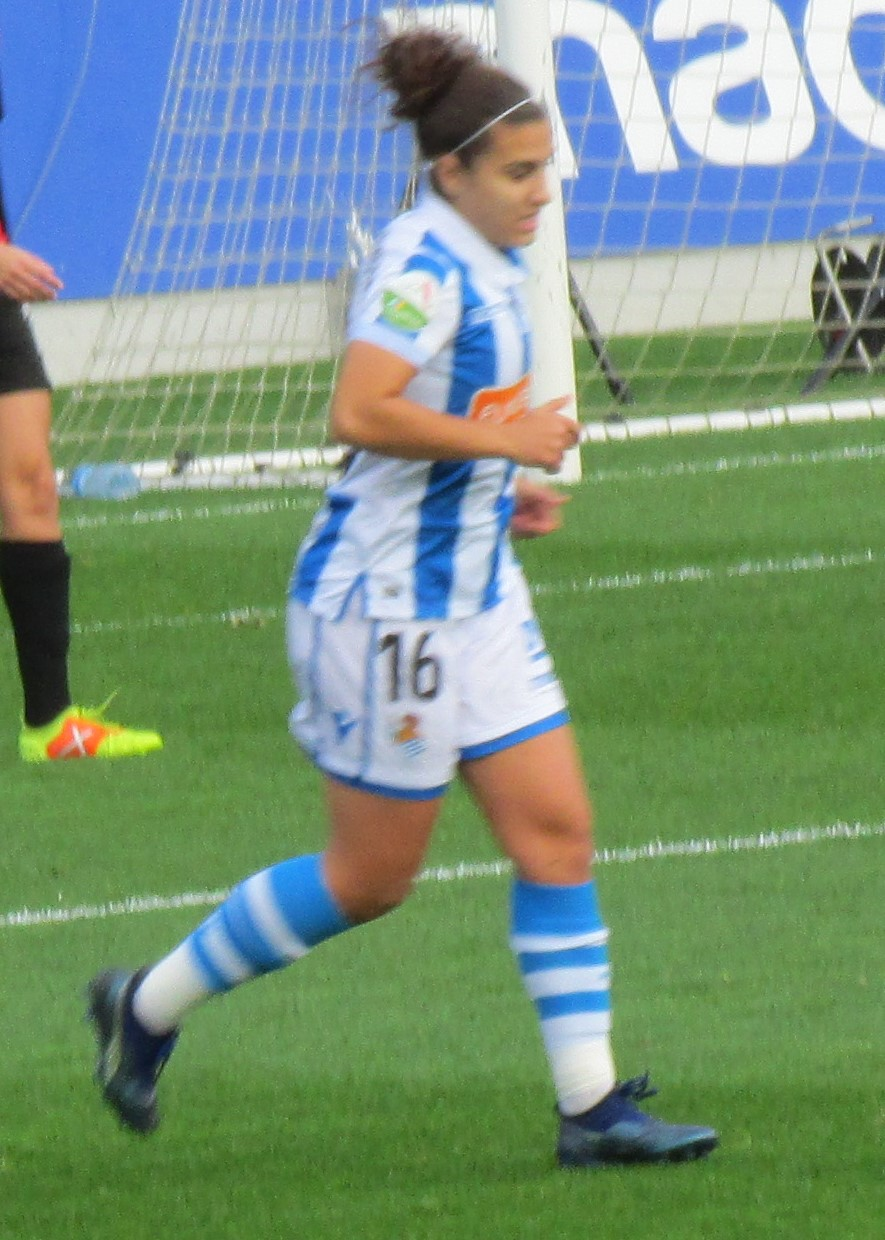
- Bautista playing for Real Sociedad in 2018

Personal information
- Full name: Carla Bautista Piqueras
- Date of birth: 14 March 2000 (age 26)
- Place of birth: Albacete, Spain
- Height: 1.61 m (5 ft 3 in)
- Position: Forward

Team information
- Current team: CA Osasuna
- Number: 19

Senior career*
Years	Team	Apps	(Gls)
2013–2015	Fundación Albacete B		
2014–2017	Fundación Albacete	62	(10)
2017–2018	Atlético Madrid	15	(1)
2018–2019	→ Real Sociedad (loan)	28	(5)
2019–2020	Real Sociedad	14	(1)
2020	→ Fundación Albacete (loan)	3	(3)
2020–2021	Valencia	17	(4)
2021	Rayo Vallecano	7	(0)
2022	Fundación Albacete		
2023-2024	MyNavi Sendai	12	(1)
2024-	CA Osasuna		

International career
- Spain U19
Medal record
Representing Spain
UEFA Women's Under-19 Championship
First place	2018 Switzerland
- * Club domestic league appearances and goals as of 22:36, 22 February 2022 (UTC)

Carla Bautista Piqueras (born 14 March 2000) is a Spanish professional footballer who plays as a forward for Primera Federación club CA Osasuna.

== Career ==
=== Clubs ===
Bautista started her career at Fundación Albacete B.

She began her career playing for Albacete’s reserve team. After two seasons, she moved up to the first team, where she spent another two seasons. In the 2017/18 season, Atlético de Madrid acquired her services; after one season, they decided to send her on loan to Real Sociedad so she could secure more playing time.

On May 11, 2019, Carla Bautista played in her second Copa de la Reina final. On this occasion, while with the *txuri-urdin* (Real Sociedad), she was able to get some minutes on the pitch against Atlético de Madrid. The team from San Sebastián won the final 2–1.

In June 2020, she signed with Valencia CF Femenino.

In July 2023, Bautista was signed by the Japanese club Mynavi Sendai Ladies.

=== National Team ===
In 2018, as part of the Spanish U-19 national team, she became a European champion in Switzerland.
