= Lucía Rodríguez (footballer) =

Spanish footballer (born 1999)

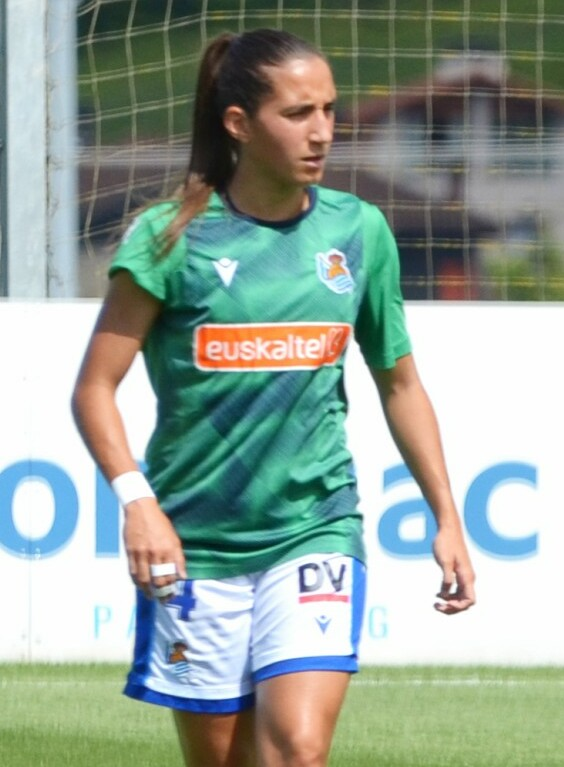
- Rodríguez with Real Sociedad in 2021

Personal information
- Full name: Lucía María Rodríguez Herrero
- Date of birth: 24 May 1999 (age 27)
- Place of birth: Madrid, Spain
- Height: 1.67 m (5 ft 6 in)
- Position: Right back

Team information
- Current team: Atlético Madrid
- Number: 2

Youth career
- 2005–2012: San Pascual-Montpellier
- 2012–2013: Vicálvaro

Senior career*
| Years | Team | Apps | (Gls) |
| 2013–2016 | Madrid CFF | | |
| 2016–2018 | CD Tacón | | |
| 2018–2019 | Madrid CFF | 26 | (2) |
| 2019–2021 | Real Sociedad | 54 | (0) |
| 2021–2023 | Real Madrid | 36 | (0) |
| 2023–2024 | Sevilla FC | 27 | (0) |
| 2024– | Real Sociedad | 59 | (2) |
| 2026– | Atlético Madrid | 0 | (0) |

International career^{‡}
| 2015–2016 | Spain U17 | 15 | (0) |
| 2017–2018 | Spain U19 | 20 | (3) |
| 2021–2023 | Spain U23 | 9 | (0) |
- * Club domestic league appearances and goals as of 02:21, 23 December 2023 (UTC) ‡ National team caps and goals as of 02:21, 23 December 2023 (UTC)

Lucía María Rodríguez Herrero (born 24 May 1999) is a Spanish professional footballer who plays as a right back for Liga F club Atlético Madrid.

== Club career ==
Rodríguez started her career with Madrid CFF.
