= Marion Rey =

Swiss association footballer (born 1999)

Personal information
- Full name: Marion Rey
- Date of birth: 21 March 1999 (age 27)
- Place of birth: Saint-Louis, France
- Height: 1.65 m (5 ft 5 in)
- Position: Midfielder

Team information
- Current team: Basel
- Number: 17

Youth career
- 2014–2016: Vendenheim
- 2016–2018: Basel

Senior career*
Years	Team	Apps	(Gls)
2018–2022	Basel	102	(11)
2022–2024	Zürich	28	(0)
2024–	Basel		

International career^{‡}
2016	France U17	3	(0)
2017–2018	France U19	6	(1)
2018	France U20	9	(0)
2022–	Switzerland	7	(0)
- * Club domestic league appearances and goals as of 13 August 2024 ‡ National team caps and goals as of 13 August 2024

Marion Rey (born 21 March 1999) is a French-Swiss footballer who plays as a midfielder for FC Basel and the Switzerland national team.

== Career ==
=== Club ===
Rey played for FC Vendenheim in Alsace in her youth. In 2016 she moved to FC Basel, where she initially played for the U-19 juniors. On 3 December 2017 she was first used in the Women's Super League. In the game against FC Lugano she came on as a substitute in the 84th minute. From then on it was used regularly. From the 2018/19 season she was part of the regular formation. After a total of six years at FC Basel, she switched to reigning Swiss champions FC Zürich in the summer of 2022. With this team she also qualified for the Women's Champions League in the 2022/23 season.

=== National team ===
Rey initially ran for the French youth teams. She is eligible to play for Switzerland through her mother being Swiss and French father. With France U-19, she competed in the 2018 U-20 World Cup. France advanced to the semifinals. However, Rey was only used in one group game. After the tournament, she decided to play for the Swiss national team in the future.

On 6 September 2022 she was used for the first time in the World Cup qualifier against Moldova by national coach Nils Nielsen. She was substituted on in the 65th minute. She was named to the squad for the 2023 World Cup.

== Achievements ==
- Swiss Champion : 2023

== Personal ==
Rey is a dual citizen. Her mother is Swiss and her father is French. She attended the Jean-Monnet High School in Strasbourg from 2014 to 2017 and obtained the baccalauréat with a science profile. From 2019 to 2022 she studied civil engineering at the HES in Muttenz for a bachelor's degree. In addition to her work as a footballer, she has been working in a civil engineering office in Zürich since autumn 2022.
