= Sanni Ojanen =

Finnish footballer (born 2000)

Personal information
- Date of birth: 21 August 2000 (age 26)
- Place of birth: Finland
- Position: Defender

Team information
- Current team: Vittsjö GIK

Youth career
- –2017: Ilves

Senior career*
Years	Team	Apps	(Gls)
2017–2020	Ilves	83	(3)
2021–2023	Åland United	67	(9)
2024	KIF Örebro	26	(1)
2025–	Vittsjö GIK	0	(0)

International career^{‡}
2019	Finland U19	2	(1)
2021–2023	Finland U23	7	(0)
- * Club domestic league appearances and goals as of 31 December 2024 ‡ National team caps and goals as of 31 December 2024

Sanni Ojanen (born 21 August 2000) is a Finnish professional footballer who plays as a defender for Damallsvenskan club Vittsjö GIK.
