= Amélie Delabre =

French footballer (born 2000)

Personal information
- Full name: Amélie Emma Delabre
- Date of birth: 26 November 2000 (age 25)
- Place of birth: Le Puy-en-Velay, France
- Height: 1.77 m (5 ft 10 in)
- Position: Forward

Team information
- Current team: Club YLA
- Number: 17

Youth career
- 2006–2011: FC Paulhaguetois
- 2011–2015: US Brioude
- 2015–2017: Saint-Étienne

Senior career*
Years	Team	Apps	(Gls)
2017–2018	Saint-Étienne	5	(4)
2018–2023	Metz	81	(18)
2023–2024	RSC Anderlecht	26	(18)
2025–2026	1. FC Köln	2	(0)
2025–2026	1. FC Köln II	3	(0)
2025–2026	→ RSC Anderlecht (loan)	19	(6)
2026–	Club YLA	8	(5)

International career
2016	France U16	6	(1)
2017	France U17	3	(1)
2017–2019	France U19	15	(13)
2017–2018	France U20	9	(5)
2022	France U23	2	(0)
- * Club domestic league appearances and goals as of 12 November 2026

Amélie Emma Delabre (born 26 November 2000) is a French professional footballer who plays as a striker for Belgian Women's Super League club Club YLA.

== International career ==
Delabre represented France at the 2022 FIFA U-20 Women's World Cup.
