= Eva van Deursen =

Dutch footballer (born 1999)

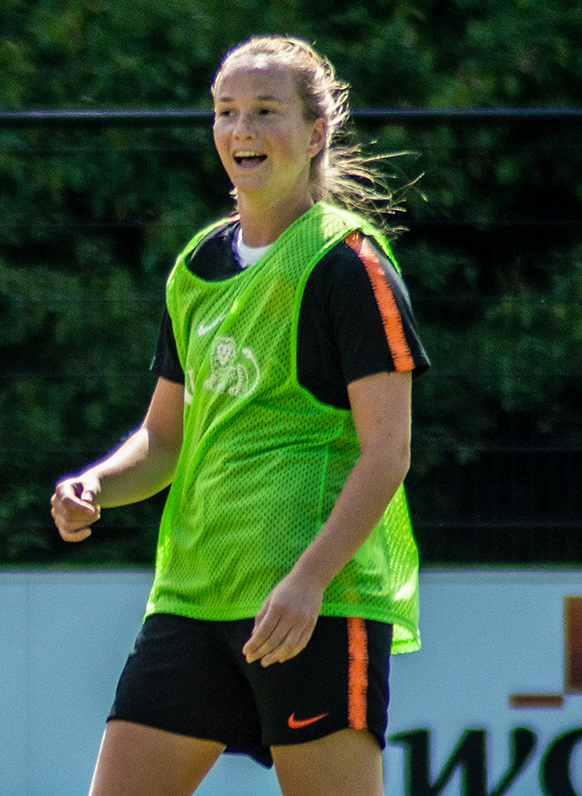
- van Deursen in 2019

Personal information
- Date of birth: 21 January 1999 (age 27)
- Place of birth: Veldhoven, Netherlands
- Height: 1.65 m (5 ft 5 in)
- Position: Midfielder

Team information
- Current team: Feyenoord
- Number: 22

Youth career
- 2004–2014: RKVVO
- 2014–2017: CTO Eindhoven

College career
Years	Team	Apps	(Gls)
2018–2022	Arizona State Sun Devils	87	(17)

Senior career*
Years	Team	Apps	(Gls)
2023–2024	Bayer 04 Leverkusen	16	(1)
2024–2025	Eibar	34	(0)
2025–	Feyenoord	2	(0)

International career
2014	Netherlands U15	4	(2)
2015	Netherlands U16	7	(0)
2015–2016	Netherlands U17	5	(3)
2016–2018	Netherlands U19	22	(4)
2018	Netherlands U20	6	(1)
2019–2023	Netherlands U23	12	(3)
- * Club domestic league appearances and goals as of 18 April 2025

Eva van Deursen (born 21 January 1999) is a Dutch professional footballer who plays as a midfielder for Vrouwen Eredivisie club Feyenoord.

== College career ==
Van Deursen was a regular player for the Arizona State Sun Devils, playing 66 of the 69 games over the last four seasons.

== Club career ==
=== Bayer Leverkusen ===
On 5 January 2023, Van Deursen was announced at Leverkusen. She made her league debut against Werder Bremen on 5 February 2023. Van Deursen scored her first league goal against Nürnberg on 30 September 2023, scoring in the 73rd minute.

=== Eibar ===
On 11 January 2024, it was announced that van Deursen would leave Leverkusen for Eibar. She made her league debut against Sevilla on 28 January 2024.

== International career ==
Van Deursen made her Netherlands U19 debut against Bulgaria women's national under-19 football team|Bulgaria U19s on 19 October 2016. She scored her first goal against Portugal U19s on 8 April 2017, scoring in the 62nd minute.

Van Deursen scored on her Netherlands U20 debut against New Zealand U20s on 5 August 2020, scoring in the 78th minute.

Van Deursen was called up to the Netherlands U21 squad in April 2019. She made her debut against England U21s on 1 June 2019.

Van Deursen made her Netherlands U23 debut against Italy U23s on 6 April 2023.

== Personal life ==
Van Deursen's role model is Lionel Messi.
