= Erika Santoro =

Italian footballer (born 1999)

Personal information
- Date of birth: 3 September 1999 (age 27)
- Place of birth: Ravenna, Italy
- Position: Defender

Team information
- Current team: Real Betis
- Number: 3

Senior career*
Years	Team	Apps	(Gls)
2014–2017	San Zaccaria	39	(1)
2017–2019	Pink Bari	32	(2)
2019–2022	Sassuolo	44	(2)
2022–2023	Parma	23	(0)
2023–2024	Sassuolo	14	(0)
2024–	Real Betis	6	(0)

International career
2015–2016	Italy U17	3	(0)
2016–2018	Italy U19	13	(2)
2019	Italy U23	1	(0)
- * Club domestic league appearances and goals as of 12 October 2024

Erika Santoro (born 3 September 1999) is an Italian professional footballer who plays as a defender for Spanish Liga F club Real Betis Féminas after a season at Italian Serie A club Sassuolo. In 2022–23 season she played for Parma.

Real Betis are based in Seville, Andalusia, Spain. Santoro's home matches for Real Betis are played at Ciudad Deportiva Luis del Sol.
