= Ella Palis =

French footballer (born 1999)

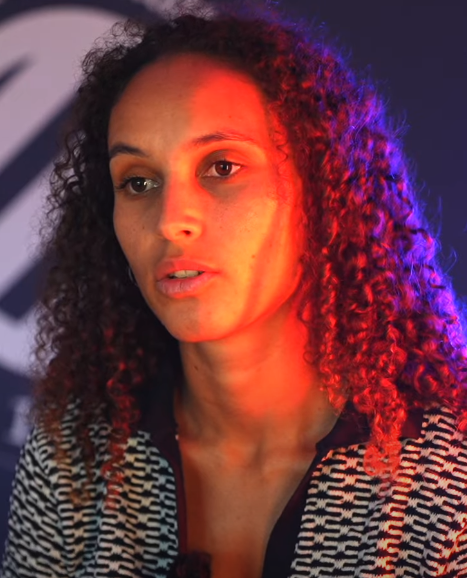
- Palis in 2024

Personal information
- Date of birth: 24 March 1999 (age 27)
- Place of birth: Brou-sur-Chantereine, France
- Height: 1.64 m (5 ft 5 in)
- Position: Midfielder

Team information
- Current team: Montpellier
- Number: 6

Youth career
- 2006–2014: AS Verson
- 2014–2016: Guingamp

Senior career*
Years	Team	Apps	(Gls)
2016–2020	Guingamp	52	(2)
2020–2023	Bordeaux	49	(1)
2023–2024	Juventus	11	(0)
2024–	Montpellier	47	(2)

International career
2015	France U17	3	(0)
2017–2018	France U19	11	(3)
2019–2022	France U23	3	(1)
2021–2022	France	16	(0)
- * Club domestic league appearances and goals as of 21 November 2026

Ella Palis (born 24 March 1999) is a French professional footballer who plays as a midfielder for Première Ligue club Montpellier.

== Club career ==
A youth academy graduate of Guingamp, Palis made her senior team debut on 16 October 2016 in a 2–2 draw against Bordeaux. In June 2020, she joined Bordeaux on a three-year deal.

In June 2023, Palis signed a two-year contract with Juventus until June 2025. On 18 July 2024, she joined Montpellier.

== International career ==
Palis is a former France youth international. She was captain of the under-19 team at the 2018 UEFA Women's Under-19 Championship.

In February 2021, Palis received her first call-up to the France senior team for the 2021 Tournoi de France. On 23 February, she made her debut in a 2–0 win against Switzerland.

== Personal life ==
Palis is the younger sister of ice hockey player Alexandre Palis.

== Career statistics ==
=== International ===
As of match played 11 November 2022

Appearances and goals by national team and year
National team	Year	Apps	Goals
France	2021	4	0
France	2022	12	0
Total		16	0
