= Beatrice Merlo =

Italian footballer (born 1999)

Personal information
- Date of birth: 23 February 1999 (age 27)
- Place of birth: Milan, Italy
- Height: 1.62 m (5 ft 4 in)
- Position: Left back

Team information
- Current team: Parma
- Number: 13

Senior career*
Years	Team	Apps	(Gls)
2013–2018	Inter Milano	87	(15)
2018–2026	Inter Milan	138	(6)
2026–	Parma	0	(0)

International career
2014–2016	Italy U17	18	(1)
2016–2018	Italy U19	15	(1)
2019	Italy U23	1	(0)
2021–	Italy	3	(0)
- * Club domestic league appearances and goals

Beatrice Merlo (born 23 February 1999) is an Italian professional footballer who plays as a left back for Serie A club Parma and the Italy women's national team.

== International career ==
Merlo made her first appearance for Italy on 16 June 2021, when they won 3–2 against Austria.
