= Signe Holt Andersen =

Danish footballer (born 1999)

Personal information
- Date of birth: 28 August 1999 (age 27)
- Place of birth: Denmark
- Position: Forward

Team information
- Current team: AGF Fodbold

Senior career*
Years	Team	Apps	(Gls)
2016–2017	IK Skovbakken		
2017–2018	VSK Aarhus	24	(15)
2018–2021	Växjö DFF	62	(12)
2021	Lazio	6	(2)
2022–2023	LSK Kvinner FK	52	(12)
2023–	AGF Fodbold	10	(1)

International career
2014–2015	Denmark U16	9	(4)
2015–2016	Denmark U17	6	(1)
2016–2018	Denmark U19	15	(7)
2019	Denmark U23	1	(0)
- * Club domestic league appearances and goals as of 22:12, 30 August 2024 (UTC)

Signe Holt Andersen (born 28 August 1999) is a Danish footballer who plays as a forward for A-Liga club AGF Fodbold.

== Club career ==
Since 2016, Andersen has featured for various A-Liga clubs, Växjö DFF, VSK Aarhus, and after the transfer in summer of 2024, AGF Fodbold. She also previously played for Lazio in Italy.

== Intentional career ==
She has represented Denmark from under-16 to under-23 youth level.
