= Ivana Čabarkapa =

Montenegrin footballer

Personal information
- Date of birth: 7 September 1999 (age 27)
- Place of birth: Pljevlja, FR Yugoslavia
- Position: Goalkeeper

Team information
- Current team: Fudbalski klub Breznica, Pljevlja

International career^{‡}
Years	Team	Apps	(Gls)
- Montenegro
- ‡ National team caps and goals as of 23:49, 31 August 2019 (UTC)

Ivana Čabarkapa (born 7 September 1999) is a Montenegrin footballer who plays as a goalkeeper and has appeared for the Montenegro women's national team.

== Career ==
Čabarkapa has been capped for the Montenegro national team, appearing for the team during the UEFA Women's Euro 2021 qualifying cycle.
