= Melanie Kuenrath =

Italian footballer (born 1999)

Personal information
- Date of birth: 23 February 1999 (age 27)
- Place of birth: Schlanders, Italy

Senior career*
Years	Team	Apps	(Gls)
2016–2019	FC Bayern II	56	(11)
2019–2021	Florentia	11	(0)
2021	Napoli	6	(0)
2022	San Marino Academy		
2022–	Trento		

International career
- South Tyrol
- * Club domestic league appearances and goals

Melanie Kuenrath (born 23 February 1999) is an Italian footballer who plays as a midfielder for Trento.

== Career ==
Kuenrath started her career with German second tier side FC Bayern II. In 2021, she signed for Napoli in the Italian top flight. Before the second half of 2021–22, Kuenrath signed for Sammarinese club San Marino Academy.

In 2022, she signed for Trento in Italy.
