= Anna Torrodà =

Spanish footballer

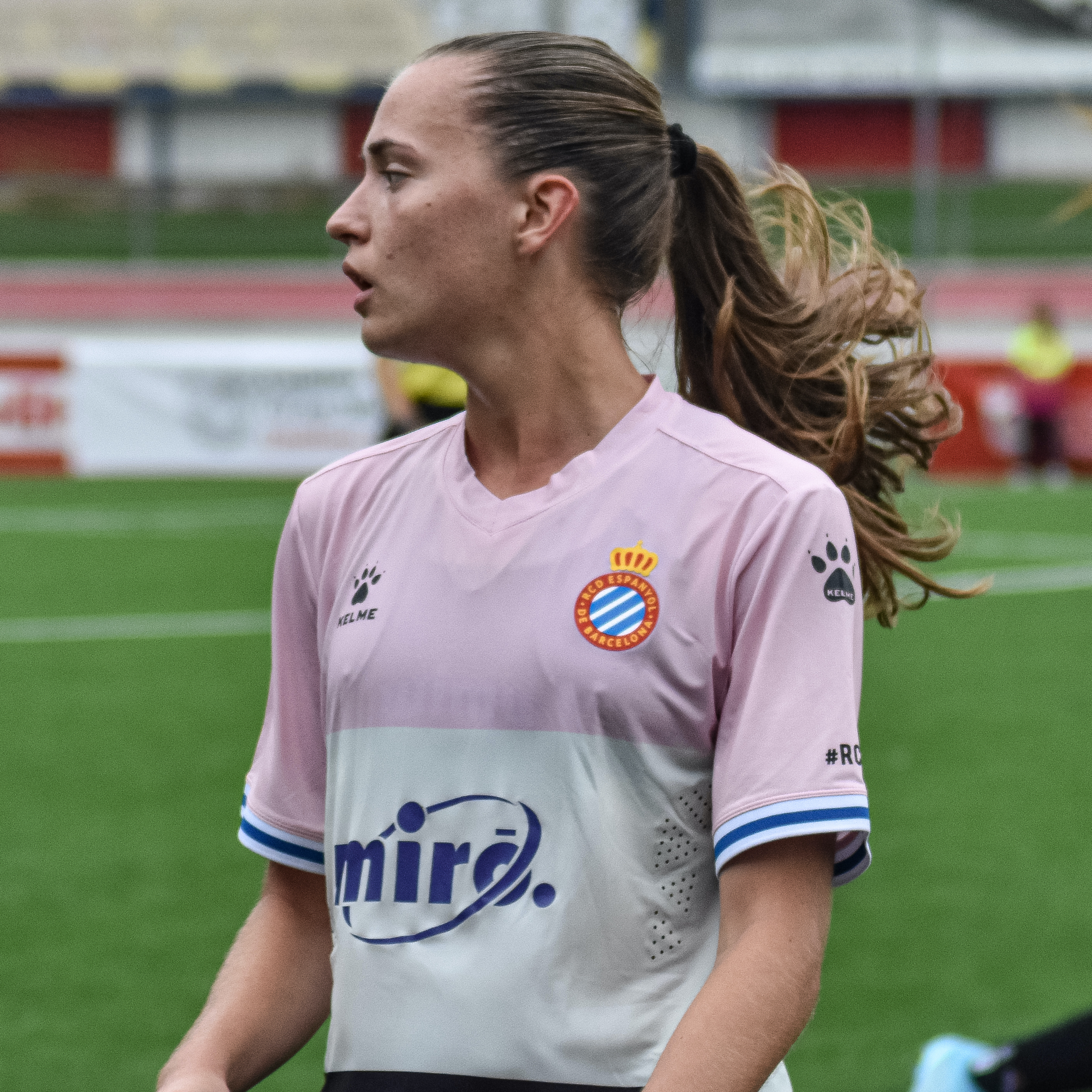
- Torrodà with Espanyol in 2019

Personal information
- Full name: Anna Torrodà Ricart
- Date of birth: 21 January 2000 (age 26)
- Place of birth: Barcelona, Spain
- Height: 1.63 m (5 ft 4 in)
- Positions: Midfielder; defender

Team information
- Current team: Espanyol
- Number: 20

Youth career
- 2013–2018: Barcelona

Senior career*
Years	Team	Apps	(Gls)
2017	Barcelona	1	(0)
2018–2020	Espanyol	46	(2)
2020–	Valencia	64	(5)

International career^{‡}
2016–2017	Spain U17	9	(0)
2017–2019	Spain U19	15	(1)
2021–	Spain	4	(0)
2021–	Spain U23	8	(1)
2019–	Catalonia	1	(0)
Medal record
Representing Spain
UEFA Women's Under-19 Championship
First place	2018 Switzerland
- * Club domestic league appearances and goals as of 17 September 2022 ‡ National team caps and goals as of 04:42, 22 December 2023 (UTC)

Anna Torrodà Ricart (born 21 January 2000) is a Spanish professional footballer who plays as a midfielder for Liga F club Espanyol and the Spain women's national team.

== Club career ==
Following five seasons in the youth tiers at Barcelona, Torrodà joined Espanyol in 2018, signing an initial one year contract. She had previously been with Espanyol between the ages of nine and 13. In June 2020, she signed a three-year contract with Valencia.

== International career ==
Representing Spain, Torrodà won the 2018 UEFA Under-19 Championship. Her performances led to her being named in the Team of the Tournament. Torrodà made her debut for the national team on 15 June 2021, coming on as a substitute for Patricia Guijarro against Denmark.
