= Rosa Márquez =

Spanish footballer (born 2000)

Personal information
- Full name: Rosa Márquez Baena
- Date of birth: 22 December 2000 (age 25)
- Place of birth: Mairena del Aljarafe, Spain
- Height: 1.58 m (5 ft 2 in)
- Position: Midfielder

Team information
- Current team: Sevilla
- Number: 20

Senior career*
Years	Team	Apps	(Gls)
2016–2025	Real Betis	201	(13)
2025–	Sevilla	9	(1)

International career^{‡}
2017	Spain U17	5	(1)
2017–2019	Spain U19	19	(5)
2021–	Spain	2	(0)
2022	Spain U23	2	(0)
Medal record
Representing Spain
UEFA Women's Under-19 Championship
First place	2018 Switzerland
- * Club domestic league appearances and goals as of 6 November 2025 ‡ National team caps and goals as of 05:09, 23 December 2023 (UTC)

Rosa Márquez Baena (born 22 December 2000) is a Spanish professional footballer who plays as a midfielder for Sevilla and the Spain national team.

== Club career ==
Márquez started playing when she was 5 years old on her local team, UD. Mairena del Aljarafe. Standing out in local matches, she received a call from Real Betis at the age of 11. Settling in the club, when she was 15 she began alternating training and calls with the reserve team and the first team.

At just 15 years old, she made her official debut. Her coach at that time, María Pry, opted for her as a starter on 10 January 2016 to play the match corresponding to the thirteenth day of Group IV of the Primera Federación. "Rosita", as she is known, was able to score two goals in Betis's 10–0 win over the Sporting de Huelva reserve team. She has captained the club on occasion.

As the seasons went by, she became the youngest player in the club's history to complete 100 official matches for Betis; of these, 80 were in the Primera División. She became the twelfth player to reach that figure with the club.

In June 2020, it was announced that she signed a new contract with Betis, committing herself to the club until 2023.

=== Injuries ===
At the beginning of the 2021–22 season, in a match against Barcelona, she suffered a rupture of the anterior cruciate ligament in her left knee. After several months out in the midst of rehabilitation of her knee, Rosa was injured again. In a gym session, a bar fell on her back, causing a break in several vertebrae.

After months of hard work, she was able to start the preseason of 2022–23 and the season normally with her teammates. Rosa seemed to return to her pre-injury level, playing several consecutive games. On matchday 7, in a match against Alhama, she received a ball on her arm, which caused a fracture in the distal third of the right radius, resulting in several missed matchdays.

== International career ==
Márquez made her debut for the national team on 15 June 2021, coming on as a substitute for Alexia Putellas against Denmark. She became the first player from Real Betis's academy to play for the Spain national team and the third Real Betis player overall to represent them.

== Personal life ==
Outside of football, Márquez studies physical therapy. She cites Andrés Iniesta as an influence both inside and outside of her footballing career.

== Career statistics ==
=== International ===
As of match played 26 September 2023.

Appearances and goals by national team and year
National team	Year	Apps	Goals
Spain	2021	1	0
Spain	2023	1	0
Total		2	0

== Honors ==
- Under-19 European Championship, 2018
