= Léa Kergal =

French footballer (born 1999)

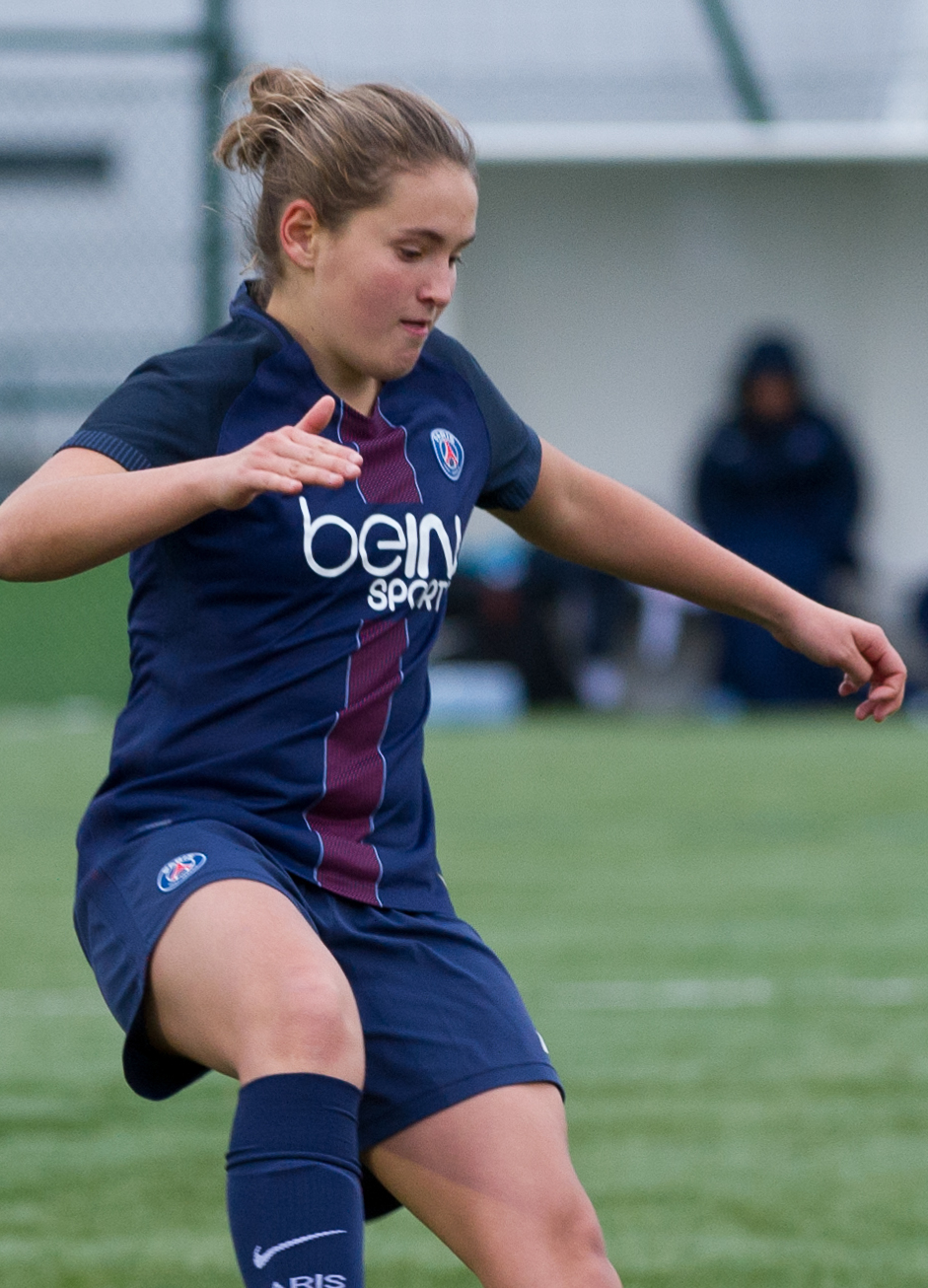

Personal information
- Date of birth: 19 June 1999 (age 27)
- Place of birth: Paris, France
- Height: 1.66 m (5 ft 5 in)
- Position: Midfielder

Youth career
- 2005–2009: AAS Fresnes
- 2009–2014: US Palaiseau
- 2014–2017: Paris Saint-Germain FC

Senior career*
Years	Team	Apps	(Gls)
2017-2018	Paris Saint-Germain FC	0	(0)
2018–2020	Le Havre	35	(0)
2020–2022	SM Caen		
2022–2023	AS Dragon		

International career
2017–2018	France U19	9	(0)
- * Club domestic league appearances and goals

Léa Kergal (born 19 June 1999) is a French former professional footballer who played as a midfielder.

== Club career ==
Kergal began playing football with AAS Fresnes e US Palaiseau, before joining Paris Saint-Germain youth team.

On 3 October 2017 she signed his first professional contract with PSG.

On 28 September 2018, Le Havre signed her for two seasons.

On 28 July 2020 Kergal joined Régional 1 side SM Caen.
