= Dajan Hashemi =

Danish footballer (born 2000)

Personal information
- Full name: Dajan Hashemi Ghermezi
- Date of birth: 21 November 2000 (age 25)
- Place of birth: Snekkersten, Denmark
- Height: 1.66 m (5 ft 5 in)
- Position: Forward

Team information
- Current team: AIK
- Number: 8

Youth career
- –2017: Hillerød

Senior career*
Years	Team	Apps	(Gls)
2017–2018	BSF	24	(4)
2018–2019	Linköping	23	(5)
2020	Hammarby	23	(9)
2021–2022	Nordsjælland	49	(10)
2023	Sassuolo	7	(0)
2023–2026	Brøndby	93	(11)
2026–	AIK		

International career^{‡}
2016	Denmark U16	4	(2)
2016–2017	Denmark U17	9	(4)
2017–2019	Denmark U19	24	(16)
2018–2025	Denmark U23	4	(1)
- * Club domestic league appearances and goals as of 27 September 2025 ‡ National team caps and goals as of 01:32, 3 September 2026 (UTC)

Dajan Hashemi (Persian: دایان هاشمی; born 21 November 2000) is a Danish footballer who plays as a forward for Damallsvenskan club AIK. Hashemi has represented the Denmark national team at youth level. Hashemi previously represented Damallsvenskan sides Linköping and Hammarby, Serie A club Sassuolo, and A-Liga clubs BSF, Nordsjælland, and most recently Brøndby.

== Club career ==
Hashemi made her Elitedivisionen debut for BSF on 19 August 2017, and made her Damallsvenskan debut for Linköping on 13 October 2018. She is one of very few Danish footballers to play abroad before reaching the age of 18. She made her UEFA debut on 17 October 2018 in the 2018–19 UEFA Women's Champions League knockout phase against Paris Saint-Germain Féminine.

Hashemi signed with Damallsvenskan side AIK in September 2026, in a deal lasting through 2027.

== International career ==
=== Youth ===
Hashemi has represented Denmark at various youth levels, including the under-17 and under-19 teams. She made her UEFA debut for Denmark on 20 September 2016 with a goal against Slovakia in the 2017 UEFA European Under-17 Championship qualification. Hashemi was one of the leading scorers of the 2018 UEFA European Under-19 Championship with two goals against the Netherlands. Her performances have invited comparisons with fellow countrywoman Nadia Nadim.

== Club statistics ==
As of 1 June 2019

Club	Division	Season	League		Cup		Continental		Total	
Club	Division	Season	Apps	Goals	Apps	Goals	Apps	Goals	Apps	Goals
BSF	Elitedivisionen	2017–18	24	2	0	0	—		24	2
Linköping	Damallsvenskan	2018	3	0	3	0	—		6	0
Linköping	Damallsvenskan	2019	6	0	0	0	2	0	8	0
Linköping	Total		9	0	3	0	2	0	14	0
Career total			33	2	3	0	2	0	38	2
