= Anna-Lena Stolze =

German footballer (born 2000)

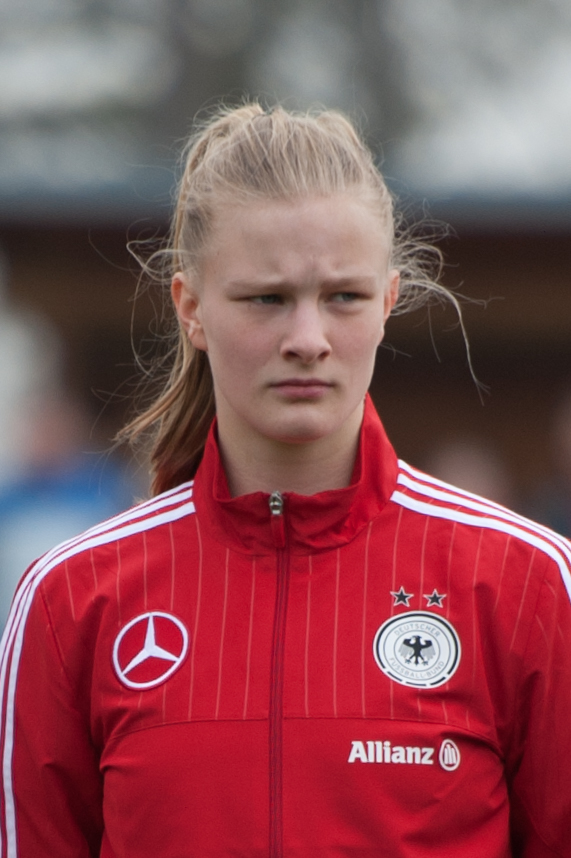
- Stolze in 2016

Personal information
- Date of birth: 8 July 2000 (age 26)
- Place of birth: Lübeck, Germany
- Height: 1.70 m (5 ft 7 in)
- Position: Forward

Team information
- Current team: 1. FC Köln
- Number: 7

Youth career
- –2015: ATSV Stockelsdorf
- 2015–2017: VfL Wolfsburg

Senior career*
Years	Team	Apps	(Gls)
2015–2019	VfL Wolfsburg II	53	(31)
2018–2022	VfL Wolfsburg	4	(0)
2020–2022	→ Twente (loan)	41	(19)
2022–2024	Twente	12	(0)
2024–	1. FC Köln	21	(1)

International career
2014–2015	Germany U15	7	(15)
2015	Germany U16	4	(2)
2015–2017	Germany U17	18	(11)
2018	Germany U19	7	(7)
Medal record
Women's football
Representing Germany
UEFA Women's U-17 Championship
Winner	2016 Belarus
- * Club domestic league appearances and goals as of 24 May 2026

Anna-Lena Stolze (born 8 July 2000) is a German professional footballer who plays as a striker for Frauen Bundesliga club 1. FC Köln.

She was a member of the German under-17 national team that won the 2016 U-17 European Championship in Belarus.

== Career ==
Stolze made her competitive debut for VfL Wolfsburg as a second-half substitute in a 2017–18 UEFA Women's Champions League quarterfinal match against SK Slavia Prague. She made her Frauen-Bundesliga debut against champions Bayern Munich in May 2018.

== Honours ==
VfL Wolfsburg

- Frauen-Bundesliga: 2019–20
- DFB-Pokal: 2019–20

FC Twente

- Eredivisie: 2020–21, 2021–22

Germany U17

- UEFA Women's Under-17 Championship: 2016
