= Andrea Norheim =

Association football player

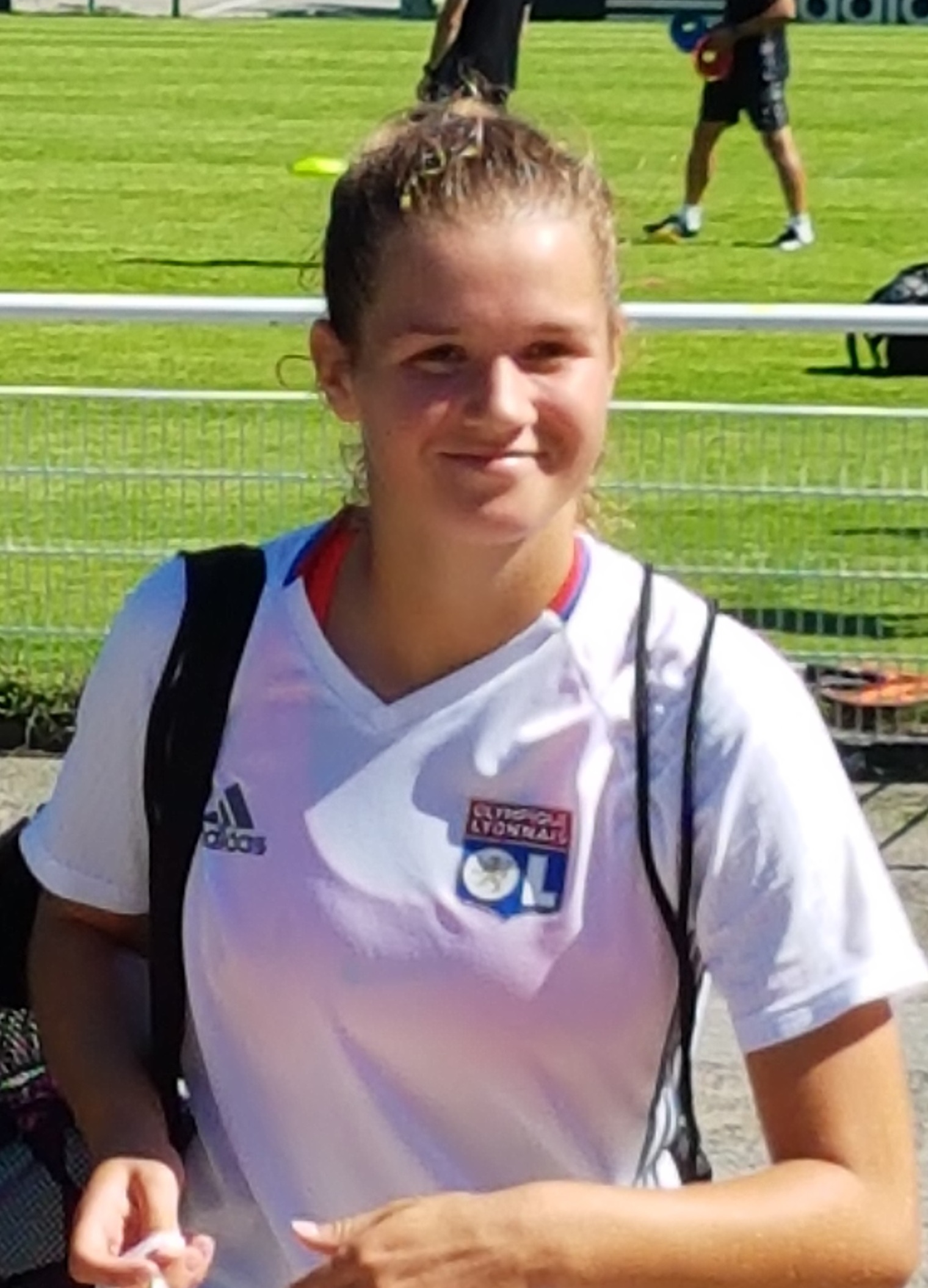
- Norheim with Lyon in 2016

Personal information
- Full name: Andrea Norheim
- Date of birth: 30 January 1999 (age 27)
- Place of birth: Bryne, Norway
- Height: 1.74 m (5 ft 9 in)
- Position: Defender

Team information
- Current team: RB Leipzig
- Number: 3

Youth career
- Bryne

Senior career*
Years	Team	Apps	(Gls)
2015–2016	Klepp	46	(47)
2016–2018	Lyon	7	(2)
2018–2020	Piteå IF	48	(14)
2020–2021	Avaldsnes IL	54	(12)
2021–2023	HB Køge	79	(10)
2023–2025	Sporting CP	57	(2)
2025–	RB Leipzig	48	(0)

International career
2014	Norway U15	4	(3)
2015	Norway U16	5	(10)
2015–2016	Norway U17	17	(3)
2016–2018	Norway U19	28	(14)
2017–2025	Norway U23	11	(2)
- * Club domestic league appearances and goals as of 22:13, 8 October 2026 (UTC)

Andrea Norheim (born 30 January 1999) is a Norwegian professional footballer who plays as a defender for Frauen-Bundesliga club RB Leipzig.

== Career ==
Norheim started her senior career with Klepp in Norway. In 2016, she moved to French club Lyon. In 2018, she signed with Piteå IF in Sweden. Norheim moved back to Norway in 2020 to play for Avaldsnes IL. The following year, she moved to Danish side HB Køge. In 2023, she joined Portuguese club Sporting CP.

== Personal life ==
Norheim was childhood friends with Erling Haaland; she trained and played matches with him for five years.

== Honours ==
Lyon

- Première Ligue: 2016–17
- Coupe de France Féminine: 2016–17
- UEFA Champions League: 2016–17

Piteå

- Damallsvenskan: 2018

Køge

- Kvindeligaen: 2021–22

Sporting

- Supertaça de Portugal: 2024
