= Sarah Jankovska =

Danish footballer

Personal information
- Date of birth: 13 August 1999 (age 27)
- Place of birth: Copenhagen, Denmark
- Height: 1.76 m (5 ft 9 in)
- Position: Midfielder

Team information
- Current team: Copenhagen
- Number: 10

Youth career
- 2005–2015: Boldklubben Skjold

Senior career*
Years	Team	Apps	(Gls)
2015–2019	BSF	60	(8)
2020	FC Nordsjælland	4	(0)
2021	B.93	10	(0)
2021–2023	HB Køge	54	(2)
2023–2025	Dijon	39	(1)
2025–2026	Badalona	22	(0)
2026–	Copenhagen		

International career^{‡}
2016–2018	Denmark U19	26	(6)
2018	Denmark U23	1	(0)
2019	Denmark	2	(0)
- * Club domestic league appearances and goals as of 14 May 2026 ‡ National team caps and goals as of 14 May 2026

Sarah Jankovska (born 13 August 1999) is a Danish professional footballer who plays as a midfielder for A-Liga club Copenhagen.

== Club career ==
Jankovska signed with A-Liga club Copenhagen in September 2026, the first Denmark international to join the side at return to the Danish league.

== International career ==
She has appeared for the Danish national junior team, several times. In November 2018, Jankovska made her debut for the Denmark women's national under-23 football team, against Finland.

Jankovska made her debut for the Denmark national team on 27 February 2019 at the 2019 Algarve Cup against the Noreay, as substitute for Pernille Harder.

== Personal life ==
Jankovska is of Macedonian descent and she received Danish citizenship in 2018.
