= 2024 UEFA Women's Under-19 Championship qualification =

Tournament details
- Dates: Round 1: 24 October – 5 December 2023; Round 2: 3 – 9 April 2024
- Teams: 51 (from 1 confederation)

Tournament statistics
- Matches played: 150
- Goals scored: 595 (3.97 per match)
- Top scorer(s): (Netherlands) Danique Tolhoek (13 goals)

The 2024 UEFA Women's Under-19 Championship qualifying competition was a women's under-19 football competition that determined the seven teams joining the automatically qualified hosts Lithuania in the final tournament.

51 teams, including hosts Lithuania, entered the qualifying competition. Players born on or after 1 January 2005 were eligible to participate.

Luxembourg made their debut at the competition.

== Format ==
In the 2022 season, UEFA implemented a new format for the women's U17 and U19 Euros, based on a league-style qualifying format.

The teams were divided in two leagues: League A (28 teams) and League B (23 teams).

Each league played two rounds:

- Round 1: In each league, groups of 4 teams played mini-tournaments. The winners of each mini-tournament in league B and the best runner-up were promoted and the last-placed teams in league A mini-tournaments were relegated.
- Round 2: The seven winners of League A qualified for the final tournament. The six winners of mini-tournaments in league B and the best runner-up were promoted and the last-placed teams in league A were relegated for Round 1 of the next edition of the tournament.

=== Tiebreakers ===
In Round 1 and Round 2, teams were ranked according to points (3 points for a win, 1 point for a draw, 0 points for a loss), and if tied on points, the following tiebreaking criteria were applied, in the order given, to determine the rankings (Regulations Articles 19.01 and 19.02):

1. Points in head-to-head matches among tied teams;
2. Goal difference in head-to-head matches among tied teams;
3. Goals scored in head-to-head matches among tied teams;
4. If more than two teams were tied, and after applying all head-to-head criteria above, a subset of teams were still tied, all head-to-head criteria above were reapplied exclusively to this subset of teams;
5. Goal difference in all group matches;
6. Goals scored in all group matches;
7. Penalty shoot-out if only two teams have the same number of points, and they met in the last round of the group and were tied after applying all criteria above (not used if more than two teams have the same number of points, or if their rankings were not relevant for qualification for the next stage);
8. Disciplinary points (red card = 3 points, yellow card = 1 point, expulsion for two yellow cards in one match = 3 points);
9. Position in the applicable ranking:
  1. for teams in Round 1, position in 2021–22 Round 2 league rankings;
  2. for teams in Round 2, position in the Round 1 league ranking.

To determine the five best third-placed teams from the qualifying round, the results against the teams in fourth place were discarded. The following criteria were applied (Regulations Article 15.01):

1. Points;
2. Goal difference;
3. Goals scored;
4. Disciplinary points;
5. Position in the applicable ranking:
  1. for teams in Round 1, position in the coefficient rankings;
  2. for teams in Round 2, position in the Round 1 league ranking.

== Round 1 ==
=== Draw ===
The draw for the qualifying round was held on 16 June 2023, at the UEFA headquarters in Nyon, Switzerland.

The teams were seeded according to their final group standings of the 2022–23 competition (Regulations Article 13.01).

Each group contained one team from Pot A, one team from Pot B, one team from Pot C, and one team from Pot D. For political reasons, Armenia and Azerbaijan and Bosnia & Herzegovina and Kosovo would not be drawn in the same group.

To determine the 2022–23 Round 2 league rankings, the following criteria was followed:

1. higher position in the following classification:
  1. League A Round 2 group winners
  2. League A Round 2 group runners-up
  3. League A Round 2 third-placed teams
  4. Teams promoted from League B
  5. Teams relegated from League A
  6. League B Round 2 runners-up
  7. League B Round 2 third-placed teams
  8. League B Round 2 fourth-placed teams
2. higher number of points in all mini-tournament matches;
3. superior goal difference in all mini-tournament matches;
4. higher number of goals scored in all mini-tournament matches;
5. lower disciplinary points (red card = 3 points, yellow card = 1 point, expulsion for two yellow cards in one match = 3 points);
6. higher position in the 2022–23 Round 1 league rankings.

Teams entering League A
Pot 1 (2023 Round 2 Group Winners) Team Germany Spain France Austria Netherlands Iceland Czech Republic	Pot 2 (2023 Round 2 Group runners-up) Team Portugal Italy Denmark Finland Serbia Republic of Ireland England	Pot 3 (2023 Round 2 3rd-placed teams) Team Poland Sweden Belgium Norway Hungary Greece Belarus	Pot 4 (Teams promoted from League B) Team Scotland Wales Northern Ireland Turkey Israel Faroe Islands Montenegro

Teams entering League B
Pot 1 (Teams relegated from League A) Team Switzerland Ukraine Slovenia Bosnia and Herzegovina (Note: As decided by the UEFA Executive Committee and the UEFA Emergency Panel, the following pairs of teams could not be drawn into the same group: Bosnia & Herzegovina and Kosovo, Armenia and Azerbaijan.) Bulgaria Romania	Pot 2 Team Croatia Slovakia North Macedonia Kosovo Estonia Albania	Pot 3 Team Lithuania Moldova Kazakhstan Armenia Latvia Azerbaijan Georgia Liechtenstein Cyprus Gibraltar Luxembourg

=== League A ===
Hosts were appointed for each mini-tournament. All the matches were played between 24 October and 5 December 2023.

==== Group A1 ====
Pos	Team	Pld	W	D	L	GF	GA	GD	Pts	Promotion
1	France (H)	3	3	0	0	7	0	+7	9	Transfer to Round 2 (League A)
2	Italy	3	2	0	1	5	3	+2	6	Transfer to Round 2 (League A)
3	Hungary	3	0	1	2	2	4	−2	1	Transfer to Round 2 (League A)
4	Northern Ireland	3	0	1	2	1	8	−7	1	Relegated to Round 2 (League B)

Source: UEFA
Rules for classification: Qualification tiebreakers
(H) Hosts
25 October 2023
13:00

Hungary	1–2	Italy
Sinka 66'	Report	Cesarini 28' (pen.); Renzotti 80'

Complexe Sportif Capitany, Colomiers
Referee: Tatyana Sorokopudova (Kazakhstan)
25 October 2023
16:00

France	4–0	Northern Ireland
Calba 1'; Joseph 21', 22', 52'	Report

Stade Jean Verbeke, Montauban
Referee: Karoline Wacker (Germany)

28 October 2023
13:00

Italy	3–0	Northern Ireland
Pellegrino Cimò 5', 77'; Donolato 90+4'	Report

Stade Jean Verbeke, Montauban
Referee: Tatyana Sorokopudova (Kazakhstan)
28 October 2023
16:00

France	1–0	Hungary
Coutel 25'	Report

Complexe Sportif Capitany, Colomiers
Referee: Emanuela Rusta (Albania)

31 October 2023
17:00

Italy	0–2	France
	Report	Joseph 61'; Rossi 90+6'

Complexe Sportif Capitany, Colomiers
Referee: Emanuela Rusta (Albania)
31 October 2023
17:00

Northern Ireland	1–1	Hungary
Loughran 25'	Report	Sinka 35'

Stade Jean Verbeke, Montauban
Referee: Karoline Wacker (Germany)

==== Group A2 ====
Pos	Team	Pld	W	D	L	GF	GA	GD	Pts	Promotion
1	England	3	3	0	0	9	1	+8	9	Transfer to Round 2 (League A)
2	Czech Republic	3	2	0	1	5	1	+4	6	Transfer to Round 2 (League A)
3	Greece	3	1	0	2	3	4	−1	3	Transfer to Round 2 (League A)
4	Wales (H)	3	0	0	3	1	12	−11	0	Relegated to Round 2 (League B)

Source: UEFA
Rules for classification: Qualification tiebreakers
(H) Hosts
24 October 2023
13:00

Greece	0–2	England
	Report	Enderby 83' (pen.); Watson 90+8'

Cardiff International Sports Stadium, Cardiff
Referee: Olatz Rivera Olmedo (Spain)
24 October 2023
19:00

Czech Republic	3–0	Wales
Bárková 26'; Kadlecová 71'; Hlaváčová 84'	Report

Dragon Park, Newport
Referee: Deborah Bianchi (Italy)

27 October 2023
13:00

Czech Republic	2–0	Greece
Truxová 49'; Krejčová 57'	Report

Cardiff International Sports Stadium, Cardiff
Referee: Rasa Grigonė (Lithuania)
27 October 2023
19:00

England	6–1	Wales
Enderby 27' (pen.), 52'; Watson 62'; Potter 70'; Pritchard 72'; Baker 90+8'	Report	Guy 10'

Dragon Park, Newport
Referee: Olatz Rivera Olmedo (Spain)

30 October 2023
13:00

England	1–0	Czech Republic
Earl 51'	Report

Cardiff International Sports Stadium, Cardiff
Referee: Rasa Grigonė (Lithuania)
30 October 2023
13:00

Wales	0–3	Greece
	Report	Chalatsogianni 7', 89' (pen.); Siafarika 90+8'

Dragon Park, Newport
Referee: Deborah Bianchi (Italy)

==== Group A3 ====
Pos	Team	Pld	W	D	L	GF	GA	GD	Pts	Promotion
1	Austria (H)	3	3	0	0	9	1	+8	9	Transfer to Round 2 (League A)
2	Denmark	3	1	1	1	10	3	+7	4	Transfer to Round 2 (League A)
3	Poland	3	1	1	1	6	5	+1	4	Transfer to Round 2 (League A)
4	Montenegro	3	0	0	3	0	16	−16	0	Relegated to Round 2 (League B)

Source: UEFA
Rules for classification: Qualification tiebreakers
(H) Hosts
25 October 2023
14:00

Poland	1–1	Denmark
Kuprowska 79'	Report	Aagaard 90+1'

Lindabrunn, Enzesfeld-Lindabrunn
Referee: Merima Čelik (Bosnia and Herzegovina)
25 October 2023
18:00

Austria	3–0	Montenegro
Ojukwu 10'; Natter 28'; Gutmann 82'	Report

Stadion Wiener Neustadt, Wiener Neustadt
Referee: Sabina Bolic (Croatia)

28 October 2023
13:00

Denmark	8–0	Montenegro
Jørgensen 10'; La Cour 16', 20', 34', 41'; Lerche 29'; Boričić 60' (o.g.); Luplau 67'	Report

Lindabrunn, Enzesfeld-Lindabrunn
Referee: Merima Čelik (Bosnia and Herzegovina)
28 October 2023
17:00

Austria	4–0	Poland
Sisic 18'; Mädl 45+3'; Ziletkina 71'; Frankhauser 90'	Report

Stadion Wiener Neustadt, Wiener Neustadt
Referee: Abigail Byrne (England)

31 October 2023
14:30

Denmark	1–2	Austria
Sørensen 80'	Report	Mädl 66', 78'

Stadion Wiener Neustadt, Wiener Neustadt
Referee: Abigail Byrne (England)
31 October 2023
14:30

Montenegro	0–5	Poland
	Report	Pačariz 25' (o.g.); Półrolniczak 43'; Gutowska 60'; Cyraniak 74' (pen.); Bogucka 80'

Lindabrunn, Enzesfeld-Lindabrunn
Referee: Sabina Bolic (Croatia)

==== Group A4 ====
Pos	Team	Pld	W	D	L	GF	GA	GD	Pts	Promotion
1	Germany	3	2	1	0	12	2	+10	7	Transfer to Round 2 (League A)
2	Finland (H)	3	2	1	0	5	1	+4	7	Transfer to Round 2 (League A)
3	Norway	3	1	0	2	8	5	+3	3	Transfer to Round 2 (League A)
4	Israel	3	0	0	3	1	18	−17	0	Relegated to Round 2 (League B)

Source: UEFA
Rules for classification: Qualification tiebreakers
(H) Hosts

The matches in group A4 were originally planned for 25, 28 and 31 October 2023. Because of the safety concerns in light of the Gaza war, matches have been postponed to 29 November, 2 and 5 December.

29 November 2023
12:00

Norway	0–1	Finland
	Report	Kiviranta 31'

Myyrmäen jalkapallostadion, Vantaa
Referee: Michalina Diakow (Poland)
29 November 2023
17:00

Germany	7–1	Israel
Ritter 16', 66'; Bartz 39', 41'; Janzen 49'; Reuter 74', 90+4'	Report	Axtmann 32' (o.g.)

Myyrmäen jalkapallostadion, Vantaa
Referee: Michèle Schmölzer (Switzerland)

2 December 2023
12:00

Finland	3–0	Israel
Halttunen 25', 37'; Lahikainen 78'	Report

Myyrmäen jalkapallostadion, Vantaa
Referee: Michalina Diakow (Poland)
2 December 2023
17:00

Germany	4–0	Norway
Baum 36'; Alber 38'; Reuter 39', 48'	Report

Myyrmäen jalkapallostadion, Vantaa
Referee: Ainara Acevedo (Spain)

5 December 2023
12:00

Finland	1–1	Germany
Seiro 73'	Report	Bartz 90'

Myyrmäen jalkapallostadion, Vantaa
Referee: Ainara Acevedo (Spain)
5 December 2023
12:00

Israel	0–8	Norway
	Report	Nøss 33'; Nilsen 51' (pen.), 85'; Reshane 62'; Melgård 64'; Nybru 74'; Vedeler 82', 83'

Mustapekka Areena, Helsinki
Referee: Michèle Schmölzer (Switzerland)

==== Group A5 ====
Pos	Team	Pld	W	D	L	GF	GA	GD	Pts	Promotion
1	Spain	3	3	0	0	16	1	+15	9	Transfer to Round 2 (League A)
2	Sweden (H)	3	2	0	1	3	3	0	6	Transfer to Round 2 (League A)
3	Portugal	3	1	0	2	8	10	−2	3	Transfer to Round 2 (League A)
4	Turkey	3	0	0	3	0	13	−13	0	Relegated to Round 2 (League B)

Source: UEFA
Rules for classification: Qualification tiebreakers
(H) Hosts
25 October 2023
13:00

Spain	4–0	Turkey
Artero 40'; C. Camacho 59', 62'; L. Martret 90+4'	Report

Swedbank Park, Västerås
Referee: Alexandra Collin (France)
25 October 2023
18:00

Sweden	1–0	Portugal
Frigren 18'	Report

Swedbank Park, Västerås
Referee: Kristina Georgieva (Bulgaria)

28 October 2023
13:00

Portugal	7–0	Turkey
Mariano 6' (pen.); Correia 11', 23'; Rafael 54'; Santiago 63'; Gago 79'; Ferreira 82'	Report

Swedbank Park, Västerås
Referee: Kristina Georgieva (Bulgaria)
28 October 2023
18:00

Spain	3–0	Sweden
López 4', 90+2'; Garmfors 28' (o.g.)	Report

Swedbank Park, Västerås
Referee: Shona Shukrula (Netherlands)

31 October 2023
18:00

Portugal	1–9	Spain
Guedes 51'	Report	L. Martret 30', 46', 52'; Corrales 42'; Arques 48'; Meninas 56' (o.g.); Alguacil 71'; García 75'; Artero 90+3'

Tunavallen, Eskilstuna
Referee: Shona Shukrula (Netherlands)
31 October 2023
18:00

Turkey	0–2	Sweden
	Report	Senelius 25'; Sandén 66'

Swedbank Park, Västerås
Referee: Alexandra Collin (France)

==== Group A6 ====
Pos	Team	Pld	W	D	L	GF	GA	GD	Pts	Promotion
1	Netherlands	3	3	0	0	15	1	+14	9	Transfer to Round 2 (League A)
2	Belgium (H)	3	2	0	1	9	3	+6	6	Transfer to Round 2 (League A)
3	Republic of Ireland	3	1	0	2	4	6	−2	3	Transfer to Round 2 (League A)
4	Faroe Islands	3	0	0	3	0	18	−18	0	Relegated to Round 2 (League B)

Source: UEFA
Rules for classification: Qualification tiebreakers
(H) Hosts
25 October 2023
12:00

Belgium	2–0	Republic of Ireland
De Meester 18'; Reynders 90+3'	Report

National Training Centre Tubize, Tubize
Referee: Jelena Medjedovic (Serbia)
25 October 2023
19:00

Netherlands	8–0	Faroe Islands
Kroese 8'; Tolhoek 12', 25', 26', 67', 83'; Frijns 41'; Thomas 80'	Report

National Training Centre Tubize, Tubize
Referee: Ana Maria Terteleac (Romania)

28 October 2023
12:00

Netherlands	3–1	Belgium
Tolhoek 6', 70'; Kroese 8'	Report	Jadoulle 59'

National Training Centre Tubize, Tubize
Referee: Volha Blotskaya (Belarus)
28 October 2023
19:00

Republic of Ireland	4–0	Faroe Islands
Fitzgerald 12', 40'; O'Leary 80'; Ralph 83'	Report

National Training Centre Tubize, Tubize
Referee: Jelena Medjedovic (Serbia)

31 October 2023
15:00

Republic of Ireland	0–4	Netherlands
	Report	Tolhoek 11', 55'; Kroese 18' (pen.); Keukelaar 34'

Stade Le Canonnier, Mouscron
Referee: Volha Blotskaya (Belarus)
31 October 2023
15:00

Faroe Islands	0–6	Belgium
	Report	Lievens 20'; Martlé 22'; Jadoulle 73', 75'; Zang Bikoula 90+2'; Jakobsen 90+4' (o.g.)

National Training Centre Tubize, Tubize
Referee: Ana Maria Terteleac (Romania)

==== Group A7 ====
The group matches were hosted by Albania.

Pos	Team	Pld	W	D	L	GF	GA	GD	Pts	Promotion
1	Serbia	3	3	0	0	6	0	+6	9	Transfer to Round 2 (League A)
2	Iceland	3	1	1	1	7	5	+2	4	Transfer to Round 2 (League A)
3	Belarus	3	1	1	1	3	4	−1	4	Transfer to Round 2 (League A)
4	Scotland	3	0	0	3	3	10	−7	0	Relegated to Round 2 (League B)

Source: UEFA
Rules for classification: Qualification tiebreakers
24 October 2023
11:00

Iceland	6–2	Scotland
K. Tryggvadóttir 11', 81', 84'; Sveinsdóttir 25'; Bárðardóttir 32'; Sigurjónsdóttir 41'	Report	Burchill 46'; Jardine 78'

Arena Kombëtare, Tirana
Referee: Deborah Anex (Switzerland)
24 October 2023
15:00

Belarus	0–2	Serbia
	Report	Matejic 32'; Uvalin 45+3'

Elbasan Arena, Elbasan
Referee: Hristiyana Guteva (Bulgaria)

27 October 2023
11:00

Serbia	2–0	Scotland
Stokić 10'; Markovic 69'	Report

Arena Kombëtare, Tirana
Referee: Hristiyana Guteva (Bulgaria)
27 October 2023
15:00

Iceland	1–1	Belarus
Í. Tryggvadóttir 38'	Report	Siniauskaya 83'

Elbasan Arena, Elbasan
Referee: Gamze Durmuş (Turkey)

30 October 2023
11:00

Serbia	2–0	Iceland
Matejic 45' (pen.); Stokić 62'	Report

Elbasan Arena, Elbasan
Referee: Gamze Durmuş (Turkey)
30 October 2023
11:00

Scotland	1–2	Belarus
Jardine 40'	Report	Maher 27'; Imkhovik 60'

Arena Kombëtare, Tirana
Referee: Deborah Anex (Switzerland)

=== League B ===
==== Group B1 ====
Pos	Team	Pld	W	D	L	GF	GA	GD	Pts	Promotion
1	Switzerland (H)	3	3	0	0	35	0	+35	9	Promotion to Round 2 (League A)
2	Albania	3	2	0	1	4	5	−1	6	Transfer to Round 2 (League B)
3	Cyprus	3	1	0	2	4	19	−15	3	Transfer to Round 2 (League B)
4	Lithuania	3	0	0	3	3	22	−19	0	Transfer to Round 2 (League B)

Source: UEFA
Rules for classification: Qualification tiebreakers
(H) Hosts
25 October 2023
13:00

Switzerland	15–0	Cyprus
Potier 6'; L. Egli 14', 22'; Schertenleib 17', 45', 45+3'; Luyet 43', 73', 81'; Kamber 53'; Constantinou 61' (o.g.); Ibishaj 62'; Tramezzani 66'; Kabashi 71', 86'	Report

Stadion Schaffhausen, Schaffhausen
Referee: Stacey Pearson (England)
25 October 2023
18:00

Lithuania	1–2	Albania
Jasaitytė 74'	Report	Borci 33'; Vasa 45+1'

Stadion Schaffhausen, Schaffhausen
Referee: Marina Živković (Serbia)

28 October 2023
14:00

Switzerland	17–0	Lithuania
Kamber 2'; J. Egli 7', 68'; Luyet 23', 44', 52', 90+3'; L. Egli 30', 90+5' (pen.); Schertenleib 33', 41'; Šveckutė 45+4' (o.g.); Potier 49' (pen.), 55'; Tauriello 72', 80'; Waldhart 82'	Report

Sportpark Bergholz, Wil
Referee: Victoria Beyer (France)
28 October 2023
19:00

Albania	2–1	Cyprus
Mila 6' (o.g.); Borci 60'	Report	Constantinou 84'

Sportpark Bergholz, Wil
Referee: Marina Živković (Serbia)

31 October 2023
13:00

Albania	0–3	Switzerland
	Report	Schertenleib 35'; Kamber 74'; Knapp 77'

Sportpark Bergholz, Wil
Referee: Victoria Beyer (France)
31 October 2023
13:00

Cyprus	3–2	Lithuania
Sergide 2', 37'; Dionissiou 86'	Report	Kriaučiūnaitė 11'; Proscevičiūtė 34'

Stadion Schaffhausen, Schaffhausen
Referee: Stacey Pearson (England)

==== Group B2 ====
Pos	Team	Pld	W	D	L	GF	GA	GD	Pts	Promotion
1	Bosnia and Herzegovina (H)	2	2	0	0	13	0	+13	6	Promotion to Round 2 (League A)
2	Estonia	2	1	0	1	9	1	+8	3	Transfer to Round 2 (League B)
3	Gibraltar	2	0	0	2	0	21	−21	0	Transfer to Round 2 (League B)
4	Liechtenstein	0	0	0	0	0	0	0	0	Withdrew

Source: UEFA
Rules for classification: Qualification tiebreakers
(H) Hosts
24 October 2023
13:30

Gibraltar	0–9	Estonia
	Report	Tarkmeel 15'; Kelli 42', 51' (pen.); Panova 54'; Lilles 67', 90+3'; Palts 71'; Lillemets 81', 86'

Stadium Etno Selo Stanišići, Bijeljina
Referee: Fabienne Michel (Germany)

27 October 2023
13:30

Bosnia and Herzegovina	12–0	Gibraltar
Radulović 2'; Avdić 6', 81'; Benković 8', 76'; Tekić 18', 67'; Oštraković 54'; Pupić 60'; Novaković 66'; Garibija 87'; Bratović 88'	Report

Stadium Etno Selo Stanišići, Bijeljina
Referee: Réka Molnar (Hungary)

30 October 2023
13:30

Estonia	0–1	Bosnia and Herzegovina
	Report	Grutop 63' (o.g.)

Stadium Etno Selo Stanišići, Bijeljina
Referee: Zulema González (Spain)

==== Group B3 ====
Pos	Team	Pld	W	D	L	GF	GA	GD	Pts	Promotion
1	Slovenia (H)	3	3	0	0	21	3	+18	9	Promotion to Round 2 (League A)
2	Kosovo	3	2	0	1	8	5	+3	6	Transfer to Round 2 (League B)
3	Moldova	3	0	1	2	1	10	−9	1	Transfer to Round 2 (League B)
4	Azerbaijan	3	0	1	2	0	12	−12	1	Transfer to Round 2 (League B)

Source: UEFA
Rules for classification: Qualification tiebreakers
(H) Hosts
8 November 2023
12:00

Slovenia	7–1	Moldova
Osojnik 4'; Dolinar 6', 45+4', 70'; Rakovec 56' (pen.); Dasovič Ravnik 69', 90+1' (pen.)	Report	Urdea 89'

Igrišče Terme Čatež, Čatež ob Savi
Referee: Louise Thompson (Northern Ireland)
8 November 2023
12:00

Azerbaijan	0–3	Kosovo
	Report	Gashi 2', 58'; Gjonbalaj 29' (pen.)

Stadion Brežice, Brežice
Referee: Kateryna Usova (Ukraine)

11 November 2023
12:00

Slovenia	9–0	Azerbaijan
Vilčnik 5', 32'; Mihelič 7'; Gerjol 17'; Osojnik 28' (pen.), 43', 45'; Dolinar 55'; Špiler 85'	Report

Igrišče Terme Čatež, Čatež ob Savi
Referee: Veronika Kovarova (Czech Republic)
11 November 2023
12:00

Kosovo	3–0	Moldova
Shabani 19', 78'; Islami 22' (pen.)	Report

Brežice, Brežice
Referee: Kateryna Usova (Ukraine)

14 November 2023
12:00

Kosovo	2–5	Slovenia
Bozhdaraj 51', 80'	Report	Mihelič 9', 45', 47'; Vilčnik 11'; Čebašek 61'

Igrišče Terme Čatež, Čatež ob Savi
Referee: Veronika Kovarova (Czech Republic)
14 November 2023
12:00

Moldova	0–0	Azerbaijan
	Report

Brežice, Brežice
Referee: Louise Thompson (Northern Ireland)

==== Group B4 ====
Pos	Team	Pld	W	D	L	GF	GA	GD	Pts	Promotion
1	Ukraine	3	3	0	0	14	1	+13	9	Promotion to Round 2 (League A)
2	North Macedonia	3	2	0	1	11	2	+9	6	Transfer to Round 2 (League B)
3	Armenia (H)	3	1	0	2	1	12	−11	3	Transfer to Round 2 (League B)
4	Luxembourg	3	0	0	3	0	11	−11	0	Transfer to Round 2 (League B)

Source: UEFA
Rules for classification: Qualification tiebreakers
(H) Hosts
24 October 2023
12:00

Luxembourg	0–4	North Macedonia
	Report	Sela 20'; Paneska 45+3'; J. Pavlovska 52'; Meijer 67'

Armavir Stadium, Armavir
Referee: Olivia Tschon (Austria)
24 October 2023
15:00

Ukraine	6–0	Armenia
Zaborovets 20'; Ptytsyna 22'; Serbuk 37'; Borovska 51', 74'; Fedorenko 73'	Report

Abovyan City Stadium, Abovyan
Referee: Oxana Cruc (Moldova)

27 October 2023
12:00

Ukraine	6–0	Luxembourg
Ptytsyna 11', 52'; Nevar 14'; Fedorenko 60', 68'; Serbuk 90'	Report

Armavir Stadium, Armavir
Referee: Maïka Vanderstichel (France)
27 October 2023
15:00

North Macedonia	6–0	Armenia
Sela 22', 48', 62'; Paneska 45+2' (pen.), 78', 90+1'	Report

Yerevan Football Academy Stadium, Yerevan
Referee: Olivia Tschon (Austria)

30 October 2023
12:00

North Macedonia	1–2	Ukraine
Sela 5'	Report	Radionova 17' (pen.); Serbuk 28'

Armavir Stadium, Armavir
Referee: Maïka Vanderstichel (France)
30 October 2023
12:00

Armenia	1–0	Luxembourg
Kostanyan 40'	Report

Yerevan Football Academy Stadium, Yerevan
Referee: Oxana Cruc (Moldova)

==== Group B5 ====
Pos	Team	Pld	W	D	L	GF	GA	GD	Pts	Promotion
1	Croatia	3	3	0	0	15	2	+13	9	Promotion to Round 2 (League A)
2	Bulgaria (H)	3	1	1	1	5	5	0	4	Transfer to Round 2 (League B)
3	Latvia	3	0	2	1	1	6	−5	2	Transfer to Round 2 (League B)
4	Georgia	3	0	1	2	1	9	−8	1	Transfer to Round 2 (League B)

Source: UEFA
Rules for classification: Qualification tiebreakers
(H) Hosts
25 October 2023
10:00

Latvia	0–5	Croatia
	Report	Augustāne 36' (o.g.); Kolčić 42'; Vunić 49'; Petković 74'; Klapan 90'

Stadium Albena 1, Albena
Referee: Franziska Wildfeuer (Germany)
25 October 2023
14:30

Bulgaria	2–1	Georgia
Sergeeva 50'; Naydenova 78'	Report	Kankia 12' (pen.)

Stadium Albena 1, Albena
Referee: Lovisa Johansson (Sweden)

28 October 2023
10:00

Croatia	7–0	Georgia
Živković 2', 65'; Vračević 18'; Jojua 34' (o.g.); Dubravica 40'; Cindrić 47'; Petković 54'	Report

Stadium Albena 1, Albena
Referee: Franziska Wildfeuer (Germany)
28 October 2023
14:30

Bulgaria	1–1	Latvia
Hropataja 55' (o.g.)	Report	Jaunslaviete 53'

Stadium Albena 1, Albena
Referee: Katalin Sipos (Hungary)

31 October 2023
13:30

Croatia	3–2	Bulgaria
Dubravica 47'; Kolčić 51'; Živković 90+7' (pen.)	Report	Sergeeva 31'; Demirova 90'

Stadium Albena 1, Albena
Referee: Katalin Sipos (Hungary)
31 October 2023
13:30

Georgia	0–0	Latvia
	Report

Stadion Druzhba, Dobrich
Referee: Lovisa Johansson (Sweden)

==== Group B6 ====
Pos	Team	Pld	W	D	L	GF	GA	GD	Pts	Promotion
1	Slovakia	2	1	1	0	9	3	+6	4	Promotion to Round 2 (League A)
2	Romania (H)	2	1	1	0	4	3	+1	4	Promotion to Round 2 (League A)
3	Kazakhstan	2	0	0	2	0	7	−7	0	Transfer to Round 2 (League B)

Source: UEFA
Rules for classification: Qualification tiebreakers
(H) Hosts
29 November 2023
11:00

Romania	3–3	Slovakia
Roșu 5', 76'; Dincă Vuia 83'	Report	Hrúziková 3', 60'; Surová 31'

Stadionul CNAF, Buftea
Referee: Katarzyna Lisiecka-Sęk (Poland)

2 December 2023
11:00

Slovakia	6–0	Kazakhstan
Vargová 3' (pen.); Straková 17'; Hrúziková 20', 21', 54'; Cabúková 77'	Report

Stadionul CNAF, Buftea
Referee: Cansu Tiryaki (Turkey)

5 December 2023
10:00

Kazakhstan	0–1	Romania
	Report	Ouatu 42'

Stadionul CNAF, Buftea
Referee: Nanna Løf Andersen (Denmark)

==== Ranking of second-placed teams ====
To determine the best runner-up, only the results of the runner-up teams against the first and third-placed teams in their group were taken into account.

Pos	Grp	Team	Pld	W	D	L	GF	GA	GD	Pts	Qualification
1	B6	Romania	2	1	1	0	4	3	+1	4	Promotion to Round 2 (League A)
2	B2	Estonia	2	1	0	1	9	1	+8	3	
3	B4	North Macedonia	2	1	0	1	7	2	+5	3	
4	B3	Kosovo	2	1	0	1	5	5	0	3	
5	B1	Albania	2	1	0	1	2	4	−2	3	
6	B5	Bulgaria	2	0	1	1	3	4	−1	1	

Source: UEFA
Rules for classification: 1) points; 2) goal difference; 3) goals scored; 4) disciplinary points; 5) coefficient ranking.

== Round 2 ==
=== Draw ===
The teams were seeded according to their results in the Round 1 (Regulations Article 15.01).

Teams entering League A

The 21 teams of Round 1 League A and the 7 teams of Round 1 League B (six group winners and the best runner-up) were drawn in seven groups of four teams. The draw for both leagues was held on 8 December 2023 at the UEFA headquarters in Nyon, Switzerland.

All group winners and the best runner-up of League B were automatically seeded into Pot D. Because League B has two groups with only 3 teams, the results of the group winners against the respective fourth-placed teams were disregarded for their ranking.

Pos	Grp	Team	Pld	W	D	L	GF	GA	GD	Pts	Seeding
1	A5	Spain	3	3	0	0	16	1	+15	9	Pot A
2	A6	Netherlands	3	3	0	0	15	1	+14	9	Pot A
3	A3	Austria	3	3	0	0	9	1	+8	9 (Note: Ranked on disciplinary points: Austria: –1, England: –2)	Pot A
4	A2	England	3	3	0	0	9	1	+8	9	Pot A
5	A1	France	3	3	0	0	7	0	+7	9	Pot A
6	A7	Serbia	3	3	0	0	6	0	+6	9	Pot A
7	A4	Germany	3	2	1	0	12	2	+10	7	Pot A
8	A4	Finland	3	2	1	0	5	1	+4	7	Pot B
9	A6	Belgium	3	2	0	1	9	3	+6	6	Pot B
10	A2	Czech Republic	3	2	0	1	5	1	+4	6	Pot B
11	A1	Italy	3	2	0	1	5	3	+2	6	Pot B
12	A5	Sweden	3	2	0	1	3	3	0	6	Pot B
13	A3	Denmark	3	1	1	1	10	3	+7	4	Pot B
14	A7	Iceland	3	1	1	1	7	5	+2	4	Pot B
15	A3	Poland	3	1	1	1	6	5	+1	4	Pot C
16	A7	Belarus	3	1	1	1	3	4	−1	4	Pot C
17	A4	Norway	3	1	0	2	8	5	+3	3	Pot C
18	A2	Greece	3	1	0	2	3	4	−1	3	Pot C
19	A5	Portugal	3	1	0	2	8	10	−2	3	Pot C
20	A6	Republic of Ireland	3	1	0	2	4	6	−2	3	Pot C
21	A1	Hungary	3	0	1	2	2	4	−2	1	Pot C
22	B1	Switzerland	2	2	0	0	18	0	+18	6	Pot D
23	B2	Bosnia and Herzegovina	2	2	0	0	13	0	+13	6	Pot D
24	B3	Slovenia	2	2	0	0	12	3	+9	6	Pot D
25	B4	Ukraine	2	2	0	0	8	1	+7	6	Pot D
26	B5	Croatia	2	2	0	0	8	2	+6	6	Pot D
27	B6	Slovakia	2	1	1	0	9	3	+6	4	Pot D
28	B6	Romania	2	1	1	0	4	3	+1	4	Pot D

Source: UEFA
Rules for classification: 1) Round 1 position; 2) points; 3) goal difference; 4) goals scored; 5) disciplinary points; 6) coefficient.
Notes:

Teams entering League B

The six best fourth-placed teams in League A were automatically seeded into Pot A, with the worst fourth-placed team being seeded into Pot B. The remaining second-, third- and fourth-placed teams from League B were seeded into Pots B, C and D, respectively.

As before, because League B has two groups with only 3 teams, the results against fourth-placed teams in Round 1 were disregarded for the ranking of teams placed second and third in League B Round 1.

Pos	Grp	Team	Pld	W	D	L	GF	GA	GD	Pts	Seeding
1	A1	Northern Ireland	3	0	1	2	1	8	−7	1	Pot A
2	A7	Scotland	3	0	0	3	3	10	−7	0	Pot A
3	A2	Wales	3	0	0	3	1	12	−11	0	Pot A
4	A5	Turkey	3	0	0	3	0	13	−13	0	Pot A
5	A3	Montenegro	3	0	0	3	0	16	−16	0	Pot A
6	A4	Israel	3	0	0	3	1	18	−17	0	Pot A
7	A6	Faroe Islands	3	0	0	3	0	18	−18	0	Pot B
8	B2	Estonia	2	1	0	1	9	1	+8	3	Pot B
9	B4	North Macedonia	2	1	0	1	7	2	+5	3	Pot B
10	B3	Kosovo	2	1	0	1	5	5	0	3	Pot B
11	B1	Albania	2	1	0	1	2	4	−2	3	Pot B
12	B5	Bulgaria	2	0	1	1	3	4	−1	1	Pot B
13	B5	Latvia	2	0	1	1	1	6	−5	1	Pot C
14	B6	Kazakhstan	2	0	0	2	0	7	−7	0	Pot C
15	B3	Moldova	2	0	0	2	1	10	−9	0	Pot C
16	B4	Armenia	2	0	0	2	0	12	−12	0	Pot C
17	B1	Cyprus	2	0	0	2	1	17	−16	0	Pot C
18	B2	Gibraltar	2	0	0	2	0	21	−21	0	Pot C
19	B5	Georgia	3	0	1	2	1	9	−8	1	Pot D
20	B3	Azerbaijan	3	0	1	2	0	12	−12	1	Pot D
21	B2	Liechtenstein	0	0	0	0	0	0	0	0	Pot D
22	B4	Luxembourg	3	0	0	3	0	11	−11	0	Pot D
23	B1	Lithuania	3	0	0	3	3	22	−19	0	Pot D

Source: UEFA
Rules for classification: 1) Round 1 position; 2) points; 3) goal difference; 4) goals scored; 5) disciplinary points; 6) coefficient.

=== League A ===
Times were CET/CEST, (Note: CET (UTC+1) for dates up to 26 March 2023, and CEST (UTC+2) for dates thereafter.) as listed by UEFA (local times, if different, are in parentheses).

==== Group A1 ====
Pos	Team	Pld	W	D	L	GF	GA	GD	Pts	Promotion
1	Spain	3	3	0	0	14	0	+14	9	Qualified for the final tournament
2	Denmark	3	1	1	1	3	4	−1	4	
3	Greece	3	1	1	1	4	9	−5	4	
4	Slovenia (H)	3	0	0	3	0	8	−8	0	Relegated to League B for the next tournament qualification

Source: UEFA
Rules for classification: Qualification tiebreakers
(H) Hosts
3 April 2024
12:00

Spain	5–0	Slovenia
Corrales 9'; Amezaga 18', 41', 77'; Alguacil 48'	Report

Športni park Radenci, Radenci
Referee: Victoria Beyer (France)
3 April 2024
12:00

Greece	2–2	Denmark
Zagkli 71'; Ntarzanou 87'	Report	Aagaard 25'; Jørgensen 83'

ŠRC Bakovci Stadium, Bakovci
Referee: Fabienne Michel (Germany)

6 April 2024
12:00

Spain	7–0	Greece
Artero 2', 48'; Librán 15', 78'; Ranera 30'; Corrales 40'; Olaya 45'	Report

ŠRC Bakovci Stadium, Bakovci
Referee: Minka Vekkeli (Finland)
6 April 2024
12:00

Denmark	1–0	Slovenia
Aagaard 30'	Report

Športni park Radenci, Radenci
Referee: Fabienne Michel (Germany)

9 April 2024
12:00

Denmark	0–2	Spain
	Report	Amezaga 5' (pen.); Olaya 34'

ŠRC Bakovci Stadium, Bakovci
Referee: Minka Vekkeli (Finland)
9 April 2024
12:00

Slovenia	0–2	Greece
	Report	Briana 13'; Stergiouli 76'

Športni park Radenci, Radenci
Referee: Victoria Beyer (France)

==== Group A2 ====
Pos	Team	Pld	W	D	L	GF	GA	GD	Pts	Promotion
1	Republic of Ireland	3	3	0	0	8	1	+7	9	Qualified for the final tournament
2	Austria	3	2	0	1	11	4	+7	6	
3	Iceland	3	1	0	2	6	8	−2	3	
4	Croatia (H)	3	0	0	3	2	14	−12	0	Relegated to League B for the next tournament qualification

Source: UEFA
Rules for classification: Qualification tiebreakers
(H) Hosts
3 April 2024
12:30

Austria	8–1	Croatia
Fankhauser 1'; Ojukwu 41' (pen.), 44' (pen.); D'Angelo 49'; Mädl 69'; Ziletkina 76', 90+3', 90+5'	Report	Dubravica 38'

Stadion Branko Čavlović-Čavlek, Karlovac
Referee: Rasa Grigonė (Lithuania)
3 April 2024
12:30

Republic of Ireland	4–1	Iceland
Bárðardóttir 56' (o.g.); Loughrey 63'; Healy 72'; Ralph 79'	Report	Kristjánsdóttir 36'

Sv. Josip Radnik, Sesvete
Referee: Merima Čelik (Bosnia and Herzegovina)

6 April 2024
12:30

Austria	0–1	Republic of Ireland
	Report	Ralph 50'

Sv. Josip Radnik, Sesvete
Referee: Silvia Gasperotti (Italy)
6 April 2024
12:30

Iceland	3–1	Croatia
Tryggvadóttir 7'; Kristjánsdóttir 54'; Óskarsdóttir 65'	Report	Dubravica 70' (pen.)

Stadion Branko Čavlović-Čavlek, Karlovac
Referee: Merima Čelik (Bosnia and Herzegovina)

9 April 2024
12:30

Iceland	2–3	Austria
Kristjánsdóttir 33'; Sveinsdóttir 45+2'	Report	Ziletkina 17'; Rukavina 45'; Sisic 54'

Sv. Josip Radnik, Sesvete
Referee: Silvia Gasperotti (Italy)
9 April 2024
12:30

Croatia	0–3	Republic of Ireland
	Report	Thompson 23'; Bergin 37'; Donegan 85'

Stadion Branko Čavlović-Čavlek, Karlovac
Referee: Rasa Grigonė (Lithuania)

==== Group A3 ====
Pos	Team	Pld	W	D	L	GF	GA	GD	Pts	Promotion
1	England	3	3	0	0	7	1	+6	9	Qualified for the final tournament
2	Portugal (H)	3	1	1	1	1	1	0	4	
3	Italy	3	0	2	1	1	4	−3	2	
4	Switzerland	3	0	1	2	0	3	−3	1	Relegated to League B for the next tournament qualification

Source: UEFA
Rules for classification: Qualification tiebreakers
(H) Hosts
3 April 2024
15:00

England	2–0	Switzerland
Pritchard 37'; Potter 58'	Report

Real Sport Club, Queluz
Referee: Marina Živković (Serbia)
3 April 2024
19:00

Portugal	0–0	Italy
	Report

Estádio Nacional, Oeiras
Referee: Shona Shukrula (Netherlands)

6 April 2024
19:00

England	1–0	Portugal
Agyemang 45+6'	Report

Estádio Nacional, Oeiras
Referee: Miriama Bočková (Slovakia)
6 April 2024
16:00

Italy	0–0	Switzerland
	Report

Real Sport Club, Queluz
Referee: Shona Shukrula (Netherlands)

9 April 2024
16:00

Italy	1–4	England
Renzotti 22'	Report	Godfrey 25', 37' (pen.); Pritchard 50', 52'

Real Sport Club, Queluz
Referee: Miriama Bočková (Slovakia)
9 April 2024
16:00

Switzerland	0–1	Portugal
	Report	Guedes 35'

Estádio Nacional, Oeiras
Referee: Marina Živković (Serbia)

==== Group A4 ====
Pos	Team	Pld	W	D	L	GF	GA	GD	Pts	Promotion
1	France	3	3	0	0	8	0	+8	9	Qualified for the final tournament
2	Norway	3	2	0	1	9	1	+8	6	
3	Czech Republic (H)	3	1	0	2	1	9	−8	3	
4	Ukraine	3	0	0	3	0	8	−8	0	Relegated to League B for the next tournament qualification

Source: UEFA
Rules for classification: Qualification tiebreakers
(H) Hosts
3 April 2024
15:00

France	2–0	Ukraine
Effa Effa 73'; Mendy 90+2'	Report

Letní stadion, Chomutov
Referee: Jelena Medjedovic (Serbia)
3 April 2024
15:00

Norway	4–0	Czech Republic
Svendsen 12'; Svendheim 22'; Sælen 88'; Fenger 90+2'	Report

FK Chmel Blšany, Blšany
Referee: Kristina Georgieva (Bulgaria)

6 April 2024
15:00

France	1–0	Norway
Chossenotte 23'	Report

Letní stadion, Chomutov
Referee: Franziska Wildfeuer (Germany)
6 April 2024
15:00

Czech Republic	1–0	Ukraine
Sladká 71'	Report

FK Chmel Blšany, Blšany
Referee: Kristina Georgieva (Bulgaria)

9 April 2024
16:00

Czech Republic	0–5	France
	Report	Chossenotte 2'; Ma. Mendy 38' (pen.); Effa Effa 45+5'; Robillard 69'; Mé. Mendy 88'

FK Chmel Blšany, Blšany
Referee: Franziska Wildfeuer (Germany)
9 April 2024
16:00

Ukraine	0–5	Norway
	Report	Natvik 9', 51', 72'; Reshane 19'; Melgård 88'

Letní stadion, Chomutov
Referee: Jelena Medjedovic (Serbia)

==== Group A5 ====
Pos	Team	Pld	W	D	L	GF	GA	GD	Pts	Promotion
1	Serbia (H)	3	2	1	0	11	2	+9	7	Qualified for the final tournament
2	Belgium	3	2	0	1	5	2	+3	6	
3	Slovakia	3	1	1	1	4	5	−1	4	
4	Belarus	3	0	0	3	1	12	−11	0	Relegated to League B for the next tournament qualification

Source: UEFA
Rules for classification: Qualification tiebreakers
(H) Hosts
3 April 2024
15:00

Serbia	2–2	Slovakia
Matejić 46'; Uvalin 58'	Report	Hrúziková 21', 54'

Serbian FA Sports Center, Stara Pazova
Referee: Ainara Acevedo (Spain)
3 April 2024
11:00

Belarus	0–3	Belgium
	Report	Ademi 19'; Reynders 36'; Zang Bikoula 48'

Serbian FA Sports Center, Stara Pazova
Referee: Maïka Vanderstichel (France)

6 April 2024
15:00

Serbia	7–0	Belarus
Matejić 15', 27' (pen.), 42', 45+2'; Stokić 32'; Stojić 36', 90'	Report

Serbian FA Sports Center, Stara Pazova
Referee: Michalina Diakow (Poland)
6 April 2024
11:00

Belgium	2–0	Slovakia
Reynders 6'; Lievens 63'	Report

Serbian FA Sports Center, Stara Pazova
Referee: Maïka Vanderstichel (France)

9 April 2024
13:00

Belgium	0–2	Serbia
	Report	Stokić 3', 90+2'

Serbian FA Sports Center, Stara Pazova
Referee: Michalina Diakow (Poland)
9 April 2024
13:00

Slovakia	2–1	Belarus
Hrúziková 1'; Straková 90'	Report	Kharashchak 15'

Serbian FA Sports Center, Stara Pazova
Referee: Ainara Acevedo (Spain)

==== Group A6 ====
Pos	Team	Pld	W	D	L	GF	GA	GD	Pts	Promotion
1	Netherlands	3	3	0	0	15	1	+14	9	Qualified for the final tournament
2	Poland	3	2	0	1	7	3	+4	6	
3	Finland	3	0	1	2	2	4	−2	1	
4	Bosnia and Herzegovina (H)	3	0	1	2	1	17	−16	1	Relegated to League B for the next tournament qualification

Source: UEFA
Rules for classification: Qualification tiebreakers
(H) Hosts
3 April 2024
15:00

Netherlands	10–0	Bosnia and Herzegovina
Tolhoek 5', 58', 62' (pen.); Frijns 38'; Keukelaar 44'; Lacroix 45+1'; Avdić 49' (o.g.); Radulović 52' (o.g.); Kroese 78', 82'	Report

Stadium Etno Selo Stanišić, Bijeljina
Referee: Alexandra Collin (France)
3 April 2024
15:00

Poland	1–0	Finland
Piętakiewicz 9'	Report

Novi Gradski, Ugljevik
Referee: Deborah Bianchi (Italy)

6 April 2024
15:00

Netherlands	3–0	Poland
Kuleczka 11' (o.g.); Van Egmond 39'; Tolhoek 76'	Report

Stadium Etno Selo Stanišić, Bijeljina
Referee: Abigail Byrne (England)
6 April 2024
15:00

Finland	1–1	Bosnia and Herzegovina
Luotonen 67'	Report	Dizdarević 54'

Novi Gradski, Ugljevik
Referee: Deborah Bianchi (Italy)

9 April 2024
15:00

Finland	1–2	Netherlands
Kiviranta 73'	Report	Verdaasdonk 14'; Nyholm 87' (o.g.)

Novi Gradski, Ugljevik
Referee: Abigail Byrne (England)
9 April 2024
15:00

Bosnia and Herzegovina	0–6	Poland
	Report	Piksa 18', 82'; Gutowska 30', 87'; Piętakiewicz 43'; Kuprowska 79'

Stadium Etno Selo Stanišić, Bijeljina
Referee: Alexandra Collin (France)

==== Group A7 ====
Pos	Team	Pld	W	D	L	GF	GA	GD	Pts	Promotion
1	Germany	3	3	0	0	12	1	+11	9	Qualified for the final tournament
2	Sweden	3	1	1	1	4	4	0	4	
3	Hungary (H)	3	1	0	2	3	10	−7	3	
4	Romania	3	0	1	2	1	5	−4	1	Relegated to League B for the next tournament qualification

Source: UEFA
Rules for classification: Qualification tiebreakers
(H) Hosts
3 April 2024
15:00

Germany	2–0	Romania
Janzen 32'; Bartz 40'	Report

Bicskei Sportpálya, Bicske
Referee: Gamze Durmuş (Turkey)
3 April 2024
15:00

Hungary	0–3	Sweden
	Report	Frigren 6'; Sprung 77'; Winblad 89'

Globall Football Park, Telki
Referee: Hristiyana Guteva (Bulgaria)

6 April 2024
15:00

Germany	6–0	Hungary
Reuter 45'; Scholz 49'; Bartz 59'; Boboy 63', 72'; Gloning 84'	Report

Globall Football Park, Telki
Referee: Volha Blotskaya (Belarus)
6 April 2024
15:00

Sweden	0–0	Romania
	Report

Bicskei Sportpálya, Bicske
Referee: Hristiyana Guteva (Bulgaria)

9 April 2024
17:30

Sweden	1–4	Germany
Sprung 85'	Report	Reuter 2'; Bartz 14'; Scholz 45+4', 65'

Bicskei Sportpálya, Bicske
Referee: Volha Blotskaya (Belarus)
9 April 2024
17:30

Romania	1–3	Hungary
Pera 64'	Report	Sinka 25', 55'; Petrovics 66'

Globall Football Park, Telki
Referee: Gamze Durmuş (Turkey)

=== League B ===
==== Group B1 ====
Pos	Team	Pld	W	D	L	GF	GA	GD	Pts	Promotion
1	North Macedonia	3	3	0	0	8	1	+7	9	Promoted to League A for the next tournament qualification
2	Wales	3	2	0	1	6	2	+4	6	
3	Lithuania	3	1	0	2	2	4	−2	3	
4	Moldova (H)	3	0	0	3	0	9	−9	0	

Source: UEFA
Rules for classification: Qualification tiebreakers
(H) Hosts
3 April 2024
12:00

Wales	2–0	Lithuania
Teisar 12' (pen.); Richardson 71'	Report

CSR Orhei, Orhei
Referee: Mzevinari Sharashanidze (Georgia)
3 April 2024
12:00

Moldova	0–4	North Macedonia
	Report	Paneska 18'; Petkova 35'; Andonova 73', 81'

Zimbru 2, Chișinău
Referee: Wendy Gijsbers (Netherlands)

6 April 2024
12:00

Wales	3–0	Moldova
Francis 68' (pen.); Davies 69'; Mcmahon 90+6'	Report

Zimbru 2, Chișinău
Referee: Sabina Bolic (Croatia)
6 April 2024
12:00

North Macedonia	2–0	Lithuania
Petkova 26', 77'	Report

CSR Orhei, Orhei
Referee: Wendy Gijsbers (Netherlands)

9 April 2024
12:00

North Macedonia	2–1	Wales
Petkova 2'; Sela 50'	Report	Francis 21'

CSR Orhei, Orhei
Referee: Sabina Bolic (Croatia)
9 April 2024
12:00

Lithuania	2–0	Moldova
Petkevičiūtė 24'; Proscevičiūtė 62'	Report

Zimbru 2, Chișinău
Referee: Mzevinari Sharashanidze (Georgia)

==== Group B2 ====
Pos	Team	Pld	W	D	L	GF	GA	GD	Pts	Promotion
1	Scotland	3	3	0	0	15	0	+15	9	Promoted to League A for the next tournament qualification
2	Albania (H)	3	2	0	1	10	3	+7	6	
3	Cyprus	3	1	0	2	5	5	0	3	
4	Liechtenstein	3	0	0	3	0	22	−22	0	

Source: UEFA
Rules for classification: Qualification tiebreakers
(H) Hosts
3 April 2024
11:30

Scotland	10–0	Liechtenstein
McAuley 7'; Burchill 13', 21', 25'; Forrest 54', 60', 78'; Mcleary 66', 90'; Murchie 90+3'	Report

House of Football Natural Pitch, Tirana
Referee: Kristina Kozoroh (Ukraine)
3 April 2024
15:30

Cyprus	0–3	Albania
	Report	Maxhalaku 30'; Methoxha 53'; Ago 85'

Elbasan Arena, Elbasan
Referee: Kathrin Huber (Austria)

6 April 2024
11:30

Scotland	2–0	Cyprus
Burchill 22'; McAuley 28'	Report

House of Football Natural Pitch, Tirana
Referee: Roxana Recorean (Romania)
6 April 2024
15:30

Albania	7–0	Liechtenstein
Borci 33', 51'; Ago 49'; Ndoj 57'; Methoxha 68'; Vasa 82'; Maxhalaku 85'	Report

Elbasan Arena, Elbasan
Referee: Kathrin Huber (Austria)

9 April 2024
15:30

Albania	0–3	Scotland
	Report	Mcleary 56'; Greenwood 63'; McAuley 69'

Elbasan Arena, Elbasan
Referee: Roxana Recorean (Romania)
9 April 2024
15:30

Liechtenstein	0–5	Cyprus
	Report	Mcbeth 19', 34', 41', 81'; Cusick 87' (pen.)

House of Football Natural Pitch, Tirana
Referee: Kristina Kozoroh (Ukraine)

==== Group B3 ====
Pos	Team	Pld	W	D	L	GF	GA	GD	Pts	Promotion
1	Kosovo	3	3	0	0	11	1	+10	9	Promoted to League A for the next tournament qualification
2	Israel	3	2	0	1	14	2	+12	6	
3	Luxembourg	3	1	0	2	10	5	+5	3	
4	Gibraltar (H)	3	0	0	3	0	27	−27	0	

Source: UEFA
Rules for classification: Qualification tiebreakers
(H) Hosts
2 April 2024
11:00

Israel	1–0	Luxembourg
Biru 9'	Report

Victoria Stadium, Gibraltar
Referee: Ugne Šmitaite (Lithuania)
2 April 2024
15:00

Gibraltar	0–5	Kosovo
	Report	Gashi 27'; Shabani 35'; Berisha 74', 84'; Kerqota 90+7'

Victoria Stadium, Gibraltar
Referee: Teona Sturua (Georgia)

5 April 2024
11:00

Kosovo	4–0	Luxembourg
Gashi 40'; Berisha 49'; Shabani 54'; Ten Raa 82' (o.g.)	Report

Victoria Stadium, Gibraltar
Referee: Teona Sturua (Georgia)
5 April 2024
15:00

Israel	12–0	Gibraltar
Sribnenko 5'; Ward 18' (o.g.); Biru 20', 38'; Sharon 35', 52', 82'; Goulden 44'; Ariel 53'; Moscovici 57'; Roth Hazan 77'; Ganor 86'	Report

Victoria Stadium, Gibraltar
Referee: Anastasia Mylopoulou (Greece)

8 April 2024
10:30

Kosovo	2–1	Israel
Elezi 50'; Gashi 71'	Report	Behrami 36' (o.g.)

Victoria Stadium, Gibraltar
Referee: Anastasia Mylopoulou (Greece)
8 April 2024
14:00

Luxembourg	10–0	Gibraltar
Marques Soares 7', 65'; Silva Moreira 34', 51', 67'; Serra 45+1', 55', 90'; Kirps 82', 86'	Report

Victoria Stadium, Gibraltar
Referee: Ugne Šmitaite (Lithuania)

==== Group B4 ====
Pos	Team	Pld	W	D	L	GF	GA	GD	Pts	Promotion
1	Bulgaria	3	3	0	0	7	2	+5	9	Promoted to League A for the next tournament qualification
2	Latvia (H)	3	2	0	1	10	5	+5	6	
3	Montenegro	3	1	0	2	6	7	−1	3	
4	Azerbaijan	3	0	0	3	0	9	−9	0	

Source: UEFA
Rules for classification: Qualification tiebreakers
(H) Hosts
3 April 2024
12:00

Montenegro	4–0	Azerbaijan
Čađenović 19', 62' (pen.); Malesija 23'; Krivokapić 86'	Report

Salaspils BSS stadium, Salaspils
Referee: Olivia Tschon (Austria)
3 April 2024
12:00

Latvia	1–4	Bulgaria
Vuškāne 30'	Report	Yordanova 1', 22', 27'; Sergeeva 57'

LNK Sporta Parks, Riga
Referee: Vesna Miletic (Bosnia and Herzegovina)

6 April 2024
12:00

Montenegro	1–5	Latvia
Rakočević 60'	Report	Malesija 41' (o.g.), 83' (o.g.); Lipšāne 53' (pen.), 71' (pen.); Vuškāne 79'

LNK Sporta Parks, Riga
Referee: Filipa Pereira Cunha (Portugal)
6 April 2024
12:00

Bulgaria	1–0	Azerbaijan
Yordanova 11'	Report

Salaspils BSS stadium, Salaspils
Referee: Vesna Miletic (Bosnia and Herzegovina)

9 April 2024
12:00

Bulgaria	2–1	Montenegro
Penchva 56'; Ivanova 67'	Report	Rakočević 38'

Salaspils BSS stadium, Salaspils
Referee: Filipa Pereira Cunha (Portugal)
9 April 2024
12:00

Azerbaijan	0–4	Latvia
	Report	Preijere 5'; Lipšāne 32' (pen.); Ansone 35'; Teļukeviča 45+2' (pen.)

LNK Sporta Parks, Riga
Referee: Olivia Tschon (Austria)

==== Group B5 ====
Pos	Team	Pld	W	D	L	GF	GA	GD	Pts	Promotion
1	Northern Ireland	3	2	1	0	7	0	+7	7	Promoted to League A for the next tournament qualification
2	Estonia	3	2	0	1	5	4	+1	6	
3	Kazakhstan	3	1	1	1	6	3	+3	4	
4	Georgia (H)	3	0	0	3	2	13	−11	0	

Source: UEFA
Rules for classification: Qualification tiebreakers
(H) Hosts
3 April 2024
12:00

Kazakhstan	1–2	Estonia
Askarova 75'	Report	Grutop 42'; Palts 58'

Mikheil Meskhi Stadium, Tbilisi
Referee: Eglantina Pjetrushaj (Albania)
3 April 2024
14:00

Northern Ireland	5–0	Georgia
McIntyre 1', 8', 15'; Weir 82'; Mann 86'	Report

M. Meskhi II Stadium, Tbilisi
Referee: Sofiya Prychyna (Ukraine)

6 April 2024
12:00

Northern Ireland	0–0	Kazakhstan
	Report

*Mikheil Meskhi Stadium, Tbilisi
Referee: Jana Van Laere (Belgium)
6 April 2024
14:00

Estonia	3–1	Georgia
Mirjam 24'; Grutop 55'; Kraus 81'	Report	Kvirkvaia 43'

M. Meskhi II Stadium, Tbilisi
Referee: Eglantina Pjetrushaj (Albania)

9 April 2024
12:00

Estonia	0–2	Northern Ireland
	Report	O'Donnell 49'; Tweedie 90+7' (pen.)

Mikheil Meskhi Stadium, Tbilisi
Referee: Jana Van Laere (Belgium)
9 April 2024
12:00

Georgia	1–5	Kazakhstan
Kvirkvaia 4'	Report	Popova 37', 53'; Kozhabekova 64'; Norbayeva 72'; Askarova 88'

M. Meskhi II Stadium, Tbilisi
Referee: Sofiya Prychyna (Ukraine)

==== Group B6 ====
Pos	Team	Pld	W	D	L	GF	GA	GD	Pts	Promotion
1	Turkey (H)	2	1	1	0	8	1	+7	4	Promoted to League A for the next tournament qualification
2	Faroe Islands	2	1	1	0	4	2	+2	4	Promoted to League A for the next tournament qualification
3	Armenia	2	0	0	2	1	10	−9	0	

Source: UEFA
Rules for classification: Qualification tiebreakers
(H) Hosts
3 April 2024
15:00

Turkey	1–1	Faroe Islands
Saraç 28'	Report	Brændstrup 45'

Arslan Zeki Demirci Sports Complex, Manavgat
Referee: Eirini Pingiou (Greece)

6 April 2024
15:00

Faroe Islands	3–1	Armenia
Brændstrup 58'; Mikkelsen 77'; Mittfoss 83'	Report	Sayadyan 4'

Arslan Zeki Demirci Sports Complex, Manavgat
Referee: Frederikke Lydia Søkjær (Denmark)

9 April 2024
15:00

Armenia	0–7	Turkey
	Report	Türçin 2'; Yıldız 3', 63'; Demir 9'; Ceylan 44', 60'; Kara 66' (pen.)

Arslan Zeki Demirci Sports Complex, Manavgat
Referee: Oxana Cruc (Moldova)

==== Ranking of second-placed teams ====
To determine the best runner-up, only the results of the runner-up teams against the first and third-placed teams in their group were taken into account.

Pos	Grp	Team	Pld	W	D	L	GF	GA	GD	Pts	Qualification
1	B6	Faroe Islands	2	1	1	0	4	2	+2	4	Promoted to League A for the next tournament qualification
2	B4	Latvia	2	1	0	1	6	5	+1	3	
3	B1	Wales	2	1	0	1	3	2	+1	3	
4	B2	Albania	2	1	0	1	3	3	0	3	
5	B3	Israel	2	1	0	1	2	2	0	3	
6	B5	Estonia	2	1	0	1	2	3	−1	3	

Source: UEFA
Rules for classification: 1) points; 2) goal difference; 3) goals scored; 4) disciplinary points; 5) coefficient; 6) drawing of lots.

== Qualified teams ==
Seven teams qualified for the final tournament along with hosts Lithuania.

Team	Qualified as	Qualified on	Previous appearances in Under-19 Euro^{1} only U-19 era (since 2002)
Lithuania	Hosts	19 April 2021	0 (debut)
Spain	Round 2 Group A1 winners	9 April 2024	16 (2002, 2003, **2004**, 2007, 2008, 2010, 2011, 2012, 2014, 2015, 2016, **2017**, **2018**, 2019, **2022**, **2023**)
Republic of Ireland	Round 2 Group A2 winners	6 April 2024	1 (2014)
England	Round 2 Group A3 winners	6 April 2024	14 (2002, 2003, 2005, 2007, 2008, **2009**, 2010, 2012, 2013, 2014, 2015, 2017, 2019, 2022)
France	Round 2 Group A4 winners	9 April 2024	17 (2002, **2003**, 2004, 2005, 2006, 2007, 2008, 2009, **2010**, **2013**, 2015, **2016**, 2017, 2018, **2019**, 2022, 2023)
Serbia	Round 2 Group A5 winners	9 April 2024	1 (2012)
Netherlands	Round 2 Group A6 winners	6 April 2024	10 (2003, 2006, 2010, 2011, **2014**, 2016, 2017, 2018, 2019, 2023)
Germany	Round 2 Group A7 winners	9 April 2024	18 (**2002**, 2003, 2004, 2005, **2006**, **2007**, 2008, 2009, 2010, **2011**, 2013, 2015, 2016, 2017, 2018, 2019, 2022, 2023)

^{1} Bold indicates champions for that year. Italic indicates hosts for that year.

== Goalscorers ==
In the qualifying round there were 317 goals scored in 75 matches, for an average of 4.23 goals per match.

In the elite round there were 278 goals scored in 75 matches, for an average of 3.71 goals per match.

In total, there were 595 goals scored in 150 matches, for an average of 3.97 goals per match.

13 goals

- (Netherlands) Danique Tolhoek

8 goals

- (Slovakia) Darina Hrúziková

7 goals

- (Switzerland) Naomi Luyet

6 goals

- (Germany) Paulina Bartz
- (Germany) Melina Laura Reuter
- (North Macedonia) Vesa Sela
- (Spain) Marina Artero
- (Switzerland) Sydney Schertenleib

5 goals

- (Austria) Alisa Ziletkina
- (Kosovo) Rreze Gashi
- (Netherlands) Fieke Kroese
- (North Macedonia) Biljana Paneska
- (Scotland) Tiree Burchill
- (Serbia) Nina Matejić
- (Serbia) Sara Stokić

4 goals

- (Albania) Klaudia Borci
- (Austria) Valentina Mädl
- (Bulgaria) Preslava Yordanova
- (Croatia) Valentina Dubravica
- (Cyprus) Sophia Victoria Mcbeth
- (Denmark) Clara La Cour
- (England) Poppy Pritchard
- (France) Liana Joseph
- (Hungary) Napsugár Sinka
- (Iceland) Katla Tryggvadóttir
- (Kosovo) Alba Shabani
- (North Macedonia) Katerina Petkova
- (Slovenia) Lea Dolinar
- (Slovenia) Naja Mihelič
- (Slovenia) Maša Osojnik
- (Spain) Jone Amezaga
- (Spain) Laia Martret
- (Switzerland) Leela Egli

3 goals

- (Austria) Nicole Ojukwu
- (Belgium) Romane Jadoulle
- (Belgium) Aurélie Reynders
- (Bulgaria) Aleksandra Sergeeva
- (Croatia) Barbara Živković
- (Denmark) Alma Aagaard
- (England) Mia Enderby
- (Germany) Marina Scholz
- (Iceland) Vigdís Kristjánsdóttir
- (Israel) Orian Biru
- (Israel) Hila Sharon
- (Kosovo) Sahare Berisha
- (Latvia) Amēlija Lipšāne
- (Luxembourg) Beatriz Silva Moreira
- (Luxembourg) Barbara Serra
- (Northern Ireland) Rachel McIntyre
- (Norway) Ida Natvik
- (Poland) Julia Gutowska
- (Republic of Ireland) Joy Ralph
- (Scotland) Lisa Forreșt
- (Scotland) Mia McAuley
- (Scotland) Jodi Mcleary
- (Slovenia) Noelle Vilčnik
- (Spain) Lucía Corrales
- (Switzerland) Lia Jara Kamber
- (Switzerland) Noémie Potier
- (Ukraine) Anhelina Fedorenko
- (Ukraine) Maryna Ptytsyna
- (Ukraine) Liliana Serbuk

2 goals

- (Albania) Klesta Ago
- (Albania) Rexhina Maxhalaku
- (Albania) Era Methoxha
- (Albania) Rosela Vasa
- (Austria) Hannah Frankhauser
- (Austria) Almedina Sisic
- (Belgium) Véronique Zang Bikoula
- (Belgium) Caitlin Lievens
- (Bosnia and Herzegovina) Edina Avdić
- (Bosnia and Herzegovina) Ivona Benković
- (Bosnia and Herzegovina) Kristina Tekić
- (Croatia) Lea Kolčić
- (Croatia) Paula Petković
- (Cyprus) Fontini Sergide
- (Denmark) Ida Marie Jørgensen
- (England) Freya Godfrey
- (England) Alexia Potter
- (England) Katy Watson
- (Estonia) Vanessa Grutop
- (Estonia) Aleksandra Kelli
- (Estonia) Kirkeliis Lillemets
- (Estonia) Kaili Lilles
- (Estonia) Liselle Palts
- (Faroe Islands) Anna Carolina Brændstrup
- (Finland) Lilli Halttunen
- (Finland) Milja Kiviranta
- (France) Shana Chossenotte
- (France) Chancelle Effa Effa
- (France) Maeline Mendy
- (Georgia (country)) Nata Kvirkvaia
- (Germany) Delice Boboy
- (Germany) Mathilde Janzen
- (Germany) Sara Ritter
- (Greece) Georgia Chalatsogianni
- (Iceland) Bergdís Sveinsdóttir
- (Italy) Giada Pellegrino Cimò
- (Italy) Monica Renzotti
- (Kazakhstan) Adiya Askarova
- (Kazakhstan) Valeriya Popova
- (Kosovo) Eltina Bozhdaraj
- (Latvia) Santa Vuškāne
- (Luxembourg) Rachel Kirps
- (Luxembourg) Lara Soraia Marques Soares
- (Montenegro) Katarina Čađenović
- (Montenegro) Anastasija Rakočević
- (Netherlands) Emma Frijns
- (Netherlands) Lotte Keukelaar
- (North Macedonia) Eva Andonova
- (Norway) Kamilla Melgård
- (Norway) Cille Nilsen
- (Norway) Emma Reshane
- (Norway) Vilde Vedeler
- (Poland) Wiktoria Kuprowska
- (Poland) Julia Piętakiewicz
- (Poland) Paulina Piksa
- (Portugal) Leonete Correia
- (Portugal) Neide Guedes
- (Republic of Ireland) Jessica Fitzgerald
- (Romania) Clara Roșu
- (Scotland) Kayla Jardine
- (Serbia) Nina Matejic
- (Serbia) Milica Stojić
- (Serbia) Nadja Uvalin
- (Slovakia) Sára Straková
- (Slovenia) Gala Dasovič Ravnik
- (Spain) Ainhoa Alguacil
- (Spain) Carla Camacho
- (Spain) Cris Librán
- (Spain) Vicky López
- (Spain) Olaya Rodríguez
- (Sweden) Sara Frigren
- (Sweden) Bea Sprung
- (Switzerland) Janina Egli
- (Switzerland) Yllëza Kabashi
- (Switzerland) Mara Tauriello
- (Turkey) Berfin Ceylan
- (Turkey) Mine Yıldız
- (Ukraine) Diana Borovska

1 goal

- (Albania) Xhesika Ndoj
- (Armenia) Lusine Kostanyan
- (Armenia) Milena Sayadyan
- (Austria) Theresa D'Angelo
- (Austria) Sarah Gutmann
- (Austria) Linda Natter
- (Austria) Magdalena Rukavina
- (Belarus) Valeryia Imkhovik
- (Belarus) Alina Kharashchak
- (Belarus) Anastasiya Maher
- (Belarus) Hanna Siniauskaya
- (Belgium) Anisa Ademi
- (Belgium) Margaux Martlé
- (Belgium) Thirsa De Meester
- (Bosnia and Herzegovina) Dalal Bratović
- (Bosnia and Herzegovina) Tasneem Dizdarević
- (Bosnia and Herzegovina) Nina Garibija
- (Bosnia and Herzegovina) Jovana Novaković
- (Bosnia and Herzegovina) Lamija Oštraković
- (Bosnia and Herzegovina) Nina Pupić
- (Bosnia and Herzegovina) Lana Radulović
- (Bulgaria) Polina Demirova
- (Bulgaria) Preslava Ivanova
- (Bulgaria) Silvia Naydenova
- (Bulgaria) Plamena Penchva
- (Croatia) Mikaela Cindrić
- (Croatia) Nikolina Klapan
- (Croatia) Tea Vračević
- (Croatia) Lucija Vunić
- (Cyprus) Marilia Constantinou
- (Cyprus) Andrea Rose Cusick
- (Cyprus) Sophie Dionissiou
- (Czech Republic) Anna Bárková
- (Czech Republic) Monika Hlaváčová
- (Czech Republic) Barbora Kadlecová
- (Czech Republic) Lucie Krejčová
- (Czech Republic) Veronika Sladká
- (Czech Republic) Šarlota Truxová
- (Denmark) Mie Lerche
- (Denmark) Emilie Luplau
- (Denmark) Jóhanna Sørensen
- (England) Michelle Agyemang
- (England) Ava Baker
- (England) Madison Earl
- (Estonia) Grete Kraus
- (Estonia) Jane Mirjam
- (Estonia) Marta Panova
- (Estonia) Helina Tarkmeel
- (Faroe Islands) Anna Katrina Mikkelsen
- (Faroe Islands) Astrid Mittfoss
- (Finland) Anelma Lahikainen
- (Finland) Amelia Luotonen
- (Finland) Elli Seiro
- (France) Lucie Calba
- (France) Charline Coutel
- (France) Mélinda Mendy
- (France) Camille Robillard
- (France) Fanny Rossi
- (Georgia (country)) Lizi Kankia
- (Germany) Mara Alber
- (Germany) Lisa Baum
- (Germany) Laura Gloning
- (Greece) Antonia Briana
- (Greece) Stamatia Ntarzanou
- (Greece) Niki Siafarika
- (Greece) Stefania Stergiouli
- (Greece) Sofia Zagkli
- (Hungary) Petra Petrovics
- (Iceland) Sigdís Bárðardóttir
- (Iceland) Emelía Óskarsdóttir
- (Iceland) Elísa Lana Sigurjónsdóttir
- (Iceland) Ísabella Tryggvadóttir
- (Israel) Ronnie Ariel
- (Israel) Maya Ganor
- (Israel) Adee Hadas Goulden
- (Israel) Ziv Roth Hazan
- (Israel) Moran Moscovici
- (Israel) Eva Sribnenko
- (Italy) Erin Cesarini
- (Italy) Valentina Donolato
- (Kazakhstan) Ayazhan Kozhabekova
- (Kazakhstan) Kazyna Norbayeva
- (Kosovo) Eriona Elezi
- (Kosovo) Bardha Gjonbalaj
- (Kosovo) Lorita Islami
- (Kosovo) Ema Kerqota
- (Latvia) Alīna Ansone
- (Latvia) Evelīna Jaunslaviete
- (Latvia) Nikola Preijere
- (Latvia) Marina Teļukeviča
- (Lithuania) Karolina Jasaitytė
- (Lithuania) Ema Kriaučiūnaitė
- (Lithuania) Meida Proscevičiūtė
- (Moldova) Vladlena Urdea
- (Montenegro) Ana Krivokapić
- (Montenegro) Tanja Malesija
- (Netherlands) Bo van Egmond
- (Netherlands) Robine Lacroix
- (Netherlands) Kealyn Thomas
- (Netherlands) Suus Verdaasdonk
- (North Macedonia) Simona Rebekka Meijer
- (North Macedonia) Jovana Pavlovska
- (Northern Ireland) Faye Loughran
- (Northern Ireland) Rebecca Mann
- (Northern Ireland) Niamh O'Donnell
- (Northern Ireland) Sarah Tweedie
- (Northern Ireland) Kascie Weir
- (Norway) Martine Fenger
- (Norway) Nora Nøss
- (Norway) Kristine Nybru
- (Norway) Linnea Sælen
- (Norway) Tomine Svendheim
- (Norway) Miia Hambro Svendsen
- (Poland) Aleksandra Bogucka
- (Poland) Jagoda Cyraniak
- (Poland) Magdalena Półrolniczak
- (Portugal) Maria Ferreira
- (Portugal) Marta Gago
- (Portugal) Mafalda Mariano
- (Portugal) Luana Rafael
- (Portugal) Carolina Santiago
- (Republic of Ireland) Ceola Bergin
- (Republic of Ireland) Hazel Donegan
- (Republic of Ireland) Hannah Healy
- (Republic of Ireland) Jodie Loughrey
- (Republic of Ireland) Lia O'Leary
- (Republic of Ireland) Kate Thompson
- (Romania) Shaira Pera
- (Romania) Nicol Dincă Vuia
- (Romania) Jasmine-Olympia Ouatu
- (Scotland) Brodie Greenwood
- (Scotland) Rachel Murchie
- (Serbia) Andjela Markovic
- (Slovakia) Klára Cabúková
- (Slovakia) Aneta Surová
- (Slovakia) Barbora Vargová
- (Slovenia) Neža Čebašek
- (Slovenia) Ana Gerjol
- (Slovenia) Živa Rakovec
- (Slovenia) Varja Špiler
- (Spain) Daniela Arques
- (Spain) Marisa García
- (Spain) Adriana Ranera
- (Sweden) Tilda Sandén
- (Sweden) Klara Senelius
- (Sweden) Petronella Winblad
- (Switzerland) Monika Ibishaj
- (Switzerland) Mia Knapp
- (Switzerland) Caterina Tramezzani
- (Switzerland) Nerina Waldhart
- (Turkey) Yuna Demir
- (Turkey) Ilayda Cansu Kara
- (Turkey) Nihal Saraç
- (Turkey) Tuana Türçin
- (Ukraine) Myroslava Nevar
- (Ukraine) Viktoriia Radionova
- (Ukraine) Lidiia Zaborovets
- (Wales) Lauren Davies
- (Wales) Olivia Francis
- (Wales) Rebecca Guy
- (Wales) Chloe Mcmahon
- (Wales) Amy Richardson
- (Wales) Tianna Teisar

1 own goal

- (Bosnia and Herzegovina) Edina Avdić (against The Netherlands)
- (Bosnia and Herzegovina) Lana Radulović (against The Netherlands)
- (Cyprus) Marilia Constantinou (against Switzerland)
- (Cyprus) Antriana Mila (against Albania)
- (Estonia) Vanessa Grutop (against Bosnia and Herzegovina)
- (Faroe Islands) Fríða Jakobsen (against Belgium)
- (Finland) Aura Nyholm (against The Netherlands)
- (Georgia (country)) Natia Jojua (against Croatia)
- (Germany) Alina Axtmann (against Israel)
- (Gibraltar) Sophie Ward (against Israel)
- (Iceland) Sigdís Bárðardóttir (against Republic of Ireland)
- (Kosovo) Viola Behrami (against Israel)
- (Latvia) Katrīna Augustāne (against Croatia)
- (Latvia) Anna Hropataja (against Bulgaria)
- (Lithuania) Aistė Šveckutė (against Switzerland)
- (Luxembourg) Laurene Ten Raa (against Kosovo)
- (Montenegro) Ivana Boričić (against Denmark)
- (Montenegro) Sanija Pačariz (against Poland)
- (Poland) Maja Kuleczka (against The Netherlands)
- (Portugal) Inês Meninas (against Spain)
- (Sweden) Ida Garmfors (against Spain)

2 own goals

- (Montenegro) Tanja Malesija (both against Latvia)
