= 2012 UEFA Women's Under-19 Championship first qualifying round =

Football tournament qualification stage

2012 UEFA Women's U-19 Championship First Qualifying Round was the first round of qualifications for the Final Tournament of 2012 UEFA Women's U-19 Championship. They were played in September 2011. 40 teams were split into 10 groups of 4 and teams in each group played each other once. Turkey received a bye to the final as host. The top two teams in each group and the best third-placed team entered the 2012 UEFA Women's U-19 Championship Second qualifying round to join England, France and Germany.

The host of each mini tournament is listed in italics.

== Groups ==
The draw was made on 16 November 2010 at UEFA headquarters in Nyon.

=== Group 1 ===
Team	Pld	W	D	L	GF	GA	GD	Pts
Norway	3	3	0	0	20	3	+17	9
Netherlands	3	2	0	1	10	5	+5	6
Croatia	3	1	0	2	3	12	−9	3
Bulgaria	3	0	0	3	0	13	−13	0

17 September 2011
16:00

Norway	9–0	Bulgaria
Hansen 13', 62'; Knudsen 19'; Hegerberg 31', 73'; Reiten 54', 55', 70', 74'	Report

Georgi Benkovski Stadium, Pazardzhik
Referee: Leen Martens (Belgium)

17 September 2011
16:00

Netherlands	5–1	Croatia
Bakker 9', 52', 65', 73'; Westervelt 37'	Report	Šalek 43'

Lokomotiv Stadium, Mezdra
Referee: Ginta Pēce (Latvia)

19 September 2011
16:00

Norway	7–1	Croatia
Voltervik 12'; Berget 16'; Hegerberg 34' (pen.), 75'; Sandtrøen 82'; Birkeland 85'	Report	Kotarac 70'

Georgi Benkovski Stadium, Pazardzhik
Referee: Ginta Pēce (Latvia)

19 September 2011
16:00

Bulgaria	0–3	Netherlands
	Report	Lardinois 49'; Bakker 80', 81'

Lokomotiv Stadium, Mezdra
Referee: Stéphanie Frappart (France)

22 September 2011
16:00

Netherlands	2–4	Norway
van Dongen 54'; Bakker 77'	Report	Hegerberg 24', 85' (pen.), 90+2'; Reiten 87'

Lokomotiv Stadium, Mezdra
Referee: Leen Martens (Belgium)

22 September 2011
16:00

Croatia	1–0	Bulgaria
Šalek 18'	Report

Georgi Benkovski Stadium, Pazardzhik
Referee: Stéphanie Frappart (France)

=== Group 2 ===
Team	Pld	W	D	L	GF	GA	GD	Pts
Republic of Ireland	3	3	0	0	12	1	+11	9
Portugal	3	1	1	1	4	4	0	4
Hungary	3	1	1	1	4	9	−5	4
Israel	3	0	0	3	1	7	−6	0

17 September 2011
17:00

Hungary	1–0	Israel
Beke 88' (pen.)	Report

Estádio Municipal De Oliveira Do Bairro, Oliveira do Bairro
Referee: Anastasia Pustovoitova (Russia)

17 September 2011
19:00

Republic of Ireland	1–0	Portugal
Gilroy 17'	Report

Dr. Américo Couto, Mealhada
Referee: Sara Persson (Sweden)

19 September 2011
17:00

Israel	1–5	Republic of Ireland
Tsvetkov 65'	Report	Shine 13'; Gorman 22'; Killeen 38', 81'; Jarrett 90+3'

De Anadia, Anadia
Referee: Eleni Lampadariou (Greece)

19 September 2011
19:00

Hungary	3–3	Portugal
Szabó 2'; Csiszár 10'; Tóth 45+3'	Report	Rodrigues 39'; Mendes 51'; Silva 86'

Dr. Américo Couto, Mealhada
Referee: Sara Persson (Sweden)

22 September 2011
19:00

Republic of Ireland	6–0	Hungary
Gilroy 11', 24'; Grant 18'; Killeen 31'; Gorman 59'; Murphy 70'	Report

Training Center, Luso
Referee: Anastasia Pustovoitova (Russia)

22 September 2011
19:00

Portugal	1–0	Israel
Gomes 21'	Report

Estádio Municipal de Águeda, Águeda
Referee: Eleni Lampadariou (Greece)

=== Group 3 ===
Team	Pld	W	D	L	GF	GA	GD	Pts
Czech Republic	3	3	0	0	11	1	+10	9
Poland	3	2	0	1	9	3	+6	6
Estonia	3	0	1	2	6	13	−7	1
Cyprus	3	0	1	2	4	12	−8	1

17 September 2011
16:00

Czech Republic	4–1	Cyprus
Danihelková 16'; A. Šturmová 25'; Kubešová 56'; Bartoňová 70'	Report	Giannou 56'

Rakvere Linnastaadion, Rakvere
Referee: Donka Jeleva-Terzieva (Bulgaria)

17 September 2011
16:00

Poland	4–2	Estonia
Knysak 13'; Niciński 21'; Guściora 45+1' (pen.); Cichosz 61'	Report	Leppik 62', 66'

Linnastaadion, Haapsalu
Referee: Eszter Urban (Hungary)

19 September 2011
16:00

Czech Republic	6–1	Estonia
Šturmová 54', 73', 90'; Bartoňová 55', 85'; Malinová 68'	Report	Päri 42'

Rakvere Linnastaadion, Rakvere
Referee: Eszter Urban (Hungary)

19 September 2011
16:00

Cyprus	0–5	Poland
	Report	Jaworek 12'; Balcerzak 17', 80'; Cichosz 53'; Niciński 66'

Linnastaadion, Haapsalu
Referee: Riem Hussein (Germany)

22 September 2011
16:00

Poland	0–1	Czech Republic
	Report	Burešová 26'

Rakvere Linnastaadion, Rakvere
Referee: Donka Jeleva-Terzieva (Bulgaria)

22 September 2011
16:00

Estonia	3–3	Cyprus
Päri 39'; Toom 54'; Kubassova 77'	Report	Prodromou 21'; Solomou 40', 90'

Linnastaadion, Haapsalu
Referee: Riem Hussein (Germany)

=== Group 4 ===
Team	Pld	W	D	L	GF	GA	GD	Pts
Iceland	3	3	0	0	7	1	+6	9
Wales	3	2	0	1	7	3	+4	6
Slovenia	3	1	0	2	5	6	−1	3
Kazakhstan	3	0	0	3	0	9	−9	0

17 September 2011
14:00

Iceland	2–1	Slovenia
Óladóttir 41'; Gylfadóttir 71'	Report	Erman 64'

Hlíðarendi, Reykjavík
Referee: Zuzana Kováčová (Slovakia)

17 September 2011
14:00

Wales	3–0	Kazakhstan
Parsons 14'; Wynne 60'; Curson 85'	Report

Fjölnisvöllur, Reykjavík
Referee: Danijela Marković (Serbia)

19 September 2011
18:00

Iceland	3–0	Kazakhstan
Óladóttir 1'; Antonsdóttir 26'; Shala 44'	Report

Selfossvöllur, Reykjavík
Referee: Danijela Marković (Serbia)

19 September 2011
18:00

Slovenia	1–4	Wales
Prša 67'	Report	Keryakoplis 29', 69'; Curson 42'; Davies 78'

Sparisjóðsvöllur, Reykjavík
Referee: Betina Norman (Denmark)

22 September 2011
18:00

Wales	0–2	Iceland
	Report	Sigfúsdóttir 74'; Jensen 76'

Fylkisvöllur, Reykjavík
Referee: Zuzana Kováčová (Slovakia)

22 September 2011
18:00

Kazakhstan	0–3	Slovenia
	Report	Uršič 19'; Eržen 65'; Kos 69'

Varmárvöllur, Reykjavík
Referee: Betina Norman (Denmark)

=== Group 5 ===
In group 5 Serbia advanced having the better goal difference (+1) over Ukraine (0) and Slovakia (−1) in direct matches.

Team	Pld	W	D	L	GF	GA	GD	Pts
Sweden	3	3	0	0	11	0	+11	9
Serbia	3	1	0	2	5	11	−6	3
Ukraine	3	1	0	2	4	7	−3	3
Slovakia	3	1	0	2	2	4	−2	3

17 September 2011
12:00

Sweden	7–0	Serbia
Rubensson 3', 67'; Hammarlund 29', 61', 72', 83'; Boström 76'	Report

Mestský štadión, Bardejov
Referee: Monika Mularczyk (Poland)

17 September 2011
16:00

Ukraine	2–0	Slovakia
Tomylko 40'; Moloshyk 83'	Report

Steel Aréna, Košice
Referee: Konstantina Mpoumpouri (Greece)

19 September 2011
11:00

Sweden	1–0	Slovakia
Rubensson 25' (pen.)	Report

Štadión Lokomotívy v Čermeli, Košice
Referee: Konstantina Mpoumpouri (Greece)

19 September 2011
16:00

Serbia	4–2	Ukraine
Damjanović 24'; Savanović 34'; Jovanović 42'; Stanković 47'	Report	Vorontsova 17'; Yakovishyn 26'

Zemplin Stadium, Michalovce
Referee: Lina Lehtovaara (Finland)

22 September 2011
11:00

Ukraine	0–3	Sweden
	Report	Rubensson 37'; Sadiku 81'; Andersson 87'

Štadión Lokomotívy v Čermeli, Košice
Referee: Monika Mularczyk (Poland)

22 September 2011
11:00

Slovakia	2–1	Serbia
Skácelová 45+1', 75'	Report	Čanković 56'

Steel Aréna, Košice
Referee: Lina Lehtovaara (Finland)

=== Group 6 ===
Team	Pld	W	D	L	GF	GA	GD	Pts
Austria	3	2	1	0	12	1	+11	7
Italy	3	2	1	0	11	0	+11	7
Macedonia	3	1	0	2	9	10	−1	3
Armenia	3	0	0	3	1	22	−21	0

17 September 2011
15:00

Austria	5–1	Macedonia
Tabotta 16'; Zadrazil 46', 47'; Peintinger 49'; Aschauer 73'	Report	Andonova 89'

Stadion Mladost, Strumica
Referee: Sjoukje de Jong (Netherlands)

17 September 2011
15:00

Italy	7–0	Armenia
Lecce 24', 45+3'; Mason 29', 40', 51', 60'; Alborghetti 70'	Report

Stadion Kukuš, Strumica
Referee: Irina Tereshchenko (Russia)

19 September 2011
15:00

Austria	7–0	Armenia
Mkhitaryan 7' (o.g.); Zadrazil 50', 71', 78'; Koren 60'; Babicky 68', 81'	Report

Stadion Mladost, Strumica
Referee: Irina Tereshchenko (Russia)

19 September 2011
15:00

Macedonia	0–4	Italy
	Report	Di Criscio 9'; Pugnali 40', 90+2'; Moscia 43'

Stadion Kukuš, Strumica
Referee: Elia Martinez (Spain)

22 September 2011
15:00

Italy	0–0	Austria
	Report

Stadion Mladost, Strumica
Referee: Sjoukje de Jong (Netherlands)

22 September 2011
15:00

Armenia	1–8	Macedonia
Sirunyan 57'	Report	Rochi 6', 19', 37', 45+2', 65'; Andonova 40'; Adjuleska 45'; Naceva 66'

Stadion Kukuš, Strumica
Referee: Elia Martinez (Spain)

=== Group 7 ===
Team	Pld	W	D	L	GF	GA	GD	Pts
Scotland	3	2	1	0	14	2	+12	7
Finland	3	2	1	0	5	1	+4	7
Faroe Islands	3	1	0	2	2	13	−11	3
Belarus	3	0	0	3	2	7	−5	0

17 September 2011
11:00

Scotland	9–0	Faroe Islands
Callaghan 12'; Zoltie 17'; Clelland 20', 34', 49'; McSorley 39'; Thomson 64', 81'; Richards 78'	Report

Puistolan liikuntapuisto, Helsinki
Referee: Ana Jovanović (Serbia)

17 September 2011
15:00

Finland	1–0	Belarus
Koivisto 75'	Report

Puistolan liikuntapuisto, Helsinki
Referee: Mihaela Basimamović (Croatia)

19 September 2011
13:00

Belarus	1–4	Scotland
Krasnova 63'	Report	McSorley 16'; Clelland 51', 73' (pen.), 79'

Töölön Pallokenttä, Helsinki
Referee: Linn Andersson (Sweden)

19 September 2011
18:00

Finland	3–0	Faroe Islands
Engman 33', 80'; Norrena 42'	Report

Töölön Pallokenttä, Helsinki
Referee: Ana Jovanović (Serbia)

22 September 2011
17:30

Scotland	1–1	Finland
Fulton 44'	Report	Koivisto 75'

Kaurialan Kenttä, Hämeenlinna
Referee: Mihaela Basimamović (Croatia)

22 September 2011
17:30

Faroe Islands	2–1	Belarus
Sevdal 34' (pen.); Magnussen 45'	Report	Kozyupa 11'

Töölön Pallokenttä, Helsinki
Referee: Linn Andersson (Sweden)

=== Group 8 ===
Team	Pld	W	D	L	GF	GA	GD	Pts
Denmark	3	3	0	0	18	0	+18	9
Russia	3	1	1	1	8	3	+5	4
Greece	3	1	1	1	7	9	−2	4
Latvia	3	0	0	3	1	22	−21	0

17 September 2011
12:00

Russia	7–1	Latvia
Pantyukhina 6'; Sokolova 27'; Kiskonen 49', 80'; Blynskaya 57'; Veselukha 81'; Efimova 90+1'	Report	Lūse 12'

Stadions Arkādija, Riga
Attendance: 120
Referee: Merta Tavares (Portugal)

17 September 2011
18:00

Denmark	8–0	Greece
Andersen 8', 39'; Jensen 36'; Smidt Nielsen 38'; Madsen 49'; Jans 60'; Gewitz 74'; Rask 77'	Report

Stadions Arkādija, Riga
Attendance: 100
Referee: Dilan Gökçek (Turkey)

19 September 2011
12:00

Greece	1–1	Russia
Mitkou 33'	report	Orlova 27'

Stadions Arkādija, Riga
Attendance: 65
Referee: Nelli Stepanyan (Armenia)

19 September 2011
18:00

Denmark	9–0	Latvia
Andersen 10', 21'; Rask 24'; Bovbjerg 36', 38', 55', 62'; Gewitz 44'; Madsen 70'	Report

Stadions Arkādija, Riga
Attendance: 120
Referee: Merta Tavares (Portugal)

22 September 2011
16:00

Russia	0–1	Denmark
	Report	Gewitz 18'

Ogres stadions, Ogre
Attendance: 50
Referee: Dilan Gökçek (Turkey)

22 September 2011
16:00

Latvia	0–6	Greece
	Report	Kydonaki 9'; Parmaxi 11'; Vardali 30'; Kokoviadou 35', 89'; Logou 79'

Stadions Arkādija, Riga
Attendance: 170
Referee: Nelli Stepanyan (Armenia)

=== Group 9 ===
In group 9 Northern Ireland qualified for the Second qualification round as best third-place finishers.

Team	Pld	W	D	L	GF	GA	GD	Pts
Belgium	3	2	1	0	9	2	+7	7
Romania	3	2	0	1	10	2	+8	6
Northern Ireland	3	1	1	1	5	4	+1	4
Lithuania	3	0	0	3	1	17	−16	0

17 September 2011
16:00

Belgium	1–1	Northern Ireland
Muni 55'	Report	Campbell 87'

RVC Hoboken, Hoboken
Referee: Natalia Aleksakhina (Ukraine)

17 September 2011
19:30

Romania	7–0	Lithuania
Lunca 5', 46', 50', 54', 60', 65'; Vătafu 89' (pen.)	Report

KFCO Wilrijk, Wilrijk
Referee: Vivian Peeters (Netherlands)

19 September 2011
16:00

Northern Ireland	0–3	Romania
	Report	Lunca 15', 62', 84'

K.Kontich FC, Kontich
Referee: Justyna Zajac (Poland)

19 September 2011
19:30

Belgium	6–1	Lithuania
Muni 9', 21'; Charlier 41', 89'; Mignon 45+2'; Deneve 48'	Report	Adamavičiūtė 19'

KFCO Wilrijk, Wilrijk
Referee: Vivian Peeters (Netherlands)

22 September 2011
19:00

Romania	0–2	Belgium
	Report	Aga 23'; Muni 47'

KFCO Wilrijk, Wilrijk
Referee: Natalia Aleksakhina (Ukraine)

22 September 2011
19:00

Lithuania	0–4	Northern Ireland
	Report	Nicholas 45'; Graham 45+2', 90+3'; Brennan 51'

K.Kontich FC, Kontich
Referee: Justyna Zajac (Poland)

=== Group 10 ===
Team	Pld	W	D	L	GF	GA	GD	Pts
Spain	3	3	0	0	20	0	+20	9
Switzerland	3	2	0	1	11	3	+8	6
Bosnia and Herzegovina	3	1	0	2	2	16	−14	3
Moldova	3	0	0	3	0	14	−14	0

17 September 2011
15:00

Spain	9–0	Bosnia and Herzegovina
Calderón 14'; Sampedro 24', 56'; Pinel 38', 44'; Putellas 69'; Ortiz 54', 55', 83'	Report

Stadion Grbavica, Sarajevo
Referee: Florence Guillemin (France)

17 September 2011
15:00

Switzerland	4–0	Moldova
Bernet 9'; Aigbogun 28'; Gensetter 41'; Brülhart 50'	Report

Gradski SRC Slavija Stadium, Sarajevo
Referee: Giovanna Farinelli (Italy)

19 September 2011
15:00

Spain	8–0	Moldova
Lázaro 39', 75'; Gili 48', 66', 78'; Pérez 51'; Sampedro 83'; García 90+1'	Report

Gradski SRC Slavija Stadium, Sarajevo
Referee: Giovanna Farinelli (Italy)

19 September 2011
15:00

Bosnia and Herzegovina	0–7	Switzerland
	Report	Gerber 15' (pen.); Aigbogun 29', 37', 85'; Fässler 34'; Hadžić 43' (o.g.); Herzog 73'

Stadion Grbavica, Sarajevo
Referee: Marte Sørø (Norway)

22 September 2011
15:00

Switzerland	0–3	Spain
	Report	Andrés 31'; Sampedro 65'; Putellas 66'

Stadion Grbavica, Sarajevo
Referee: Florence Guillemin (France)

22 September 2011
15:00

Moldova	0–2	Bosnia and Herzegovina
	Report	Kadrić 35', 54'

Gradski SRC Slavija Stadium, Sarajevo
Referee: Marte Sørø (Norway)

== Ranking of third-placed teams ==
In the ranking of the third-place finishers, only the results against the top two teams count. Northern Ireland were the best runners-ups and advanced.

Grp	Team	Pld	W	D	L	GF	GA	GD	Pts
9	Northern Ireland	2	0	1	1	1	4	−3	1
2	Hungary	2	0	1	1	3	9	−6	1
8	Greece	2	0	1	1	1	9	−8	1
4	Slovenia	2	0	0	2	2	6	−4	0
3	Estonia	2	0	0	2	3	10	−7	0
6	Macedonia	2	0	0	2	1	9	−8	0
5	Ukraine	2	0	0	2	2	11	−9	0
1	Croatia	2	0	0	2	2	12	−10	0
7	Faroe Islands	2	0	0	2	0	12	−12	0
10	Bosnia and Herzegovina	2	0	0	2	0	16	−16	0
