= Luxembourg women's national under-19 football team =

Women's national association football team

Luxembourg Women's U-19
- Nickname(s): Rout Léiwinnen (The Red Lionesses)
- Association: FLF
- Confederation: UEFA (Europe)
- FIFA code: LUX

First international
- Luxembourg 0–4 North Macedonia, (24 October 2023)

Biggest win
- Luxembourg 10–0 Gibraltar, (8 April 2024); Liechtenstein 0–10 Luxembourg, (8 April 2025)

Biggest defeat
- Ukraine 6–0 Luxembourg, (27 October 2023)

UEFA Women's Under-19 Championship
- Appearances: 0

FIFA U-20 Women's World Cup
- Appearances: 0

The Luxembourg women's national under-19 football team represents Luxembourg at the UEFA Women's Under-19 Championship and the FIFA U-20 Women's World Cup.

== History ==
=== UEFA Women's Under-19 Championship ===
The Luxembourg team has made their debut at the 2024 edition.

UEFA Women's Under-19 Championship record									UEFA Women's Under-19 Championship qualification record					
Year	Round	Position	Pld	W	D	L	GF	GA	Pld	W	D	L	GF	GA
Two-legged final 1998	Did not exist								Did not exist					
(Sweden) 1999	Did not exist								Did not exist					
(France) 2000	Did not exist								Did not exist					
(Norway) 2001	Did not exist								Did not exist					
(Sweden) 2002	Did not exist								Did not exist					
(Germany) 2003	Did not exist								Did not exist					
(Finland) 2004	Did not exist								Did not exist					
(Hungary) 2005	Did not exist								Did not exist					
(Switzerland) 2006	Did not exist								Did not exist					
(Iceland) 2007	Did not exist								Did not exist					
(France) 2008	Did not exist								Did not exist					
(Belarus) 2009	Did not exist								Did not exist					
(North Macedonia) 2010	Did not exist								Did not exist					
(Italy) 2011	Did not exist								Did not exist					
(Turkey) 2012	Did not exist								Did not exist					
(Wales) 2013	Did not exist								Did not exist					
(Norway) 2014	Did not exist								Did not exist					
(Israel) 2015	Did not exist								Did not exist					
(Slovakia) 2016	Did not exist								Did not exist					
(Northern Ireland) 2017	Did not exist								Did not exist					
(Switzerland) 2018	Did not exist								Did not exist					
(Scotland) 2019	Did not exist								Did not exist					
(Georgia (country)) ~~2020~~	Cancelled due to the COVID-19 pandemic								Did not exist					
(Belarus) ~~2021~~	Cancelled due to the COVID-19 pandemic								Did not exist					
(Czech Republic) 2022	Did not exist								Did not exist					
(Belgium) 2023	Did not exist								Did not exist					
(Lithuania) 2024	Did not qualify								6	1	0	5	2	21
(Poland) 2025	Did not qualify								6	2	1	3	14	9
(Bosnia and Herzegovina) 2026	Did not qualify								6	3	0	3	12	10
Total	0/26		0	0	0	0	0	0	18	6	1	11	28	40

== See also ==
- Luxembourg women's national football team
- Luxembourg women's national under-17 football team
- FIFA U-20 Women's World Cup
- UEFA Women's Under-19 Championship
