= Bea Sprung =

Swedish footballer (born 2005)

Personal information
- Full name: Ester Bea Helena Sprung
- Date of birth: 30 January 2005 (age 21)
- Place of birth: Helsingborg, Sweden
- Height: 5 ft 7 in (1.70 m)
- Position: Midfielder

Team information
- Current team: Hammarby IF
- Number: 10

Youth career
- 2012–2018: Stattena IF
- 2018–2020: Fortuna FF
- 2020–2021: FC Rosengård

Senior career*
| Years | Team | Apps | (Gls) |
| 2021–2025 | FC Rosengård | 59 | (6) |
| 2025– | Hammarby IF | 15 | (2) |
| 2026- | US Sassuolo Calcio | 7 | (0) |

International career^{‡}
| 2021–2022 | Sweden U17 | 8 | (1) |
| 2022–2024 | Sweden U19 | 21 | (2) |
| 2024– | Sweden U23 | 6 | (1) |
Medal record
Women's football
Representing Sweden
- * Club domestic league appearances and goals as of 15 November 2026 ‡ National team caps and goals as of 15 November 2026

Ester Bea Helena Sprung (born 30 January 2005) is a Swedish professional footballer who plays as an attacking midfielder for Damallsvenskan club Hammarby IF and the Sweden women's national under-23 team. She has previously represented FC Rosengård, where she won three national championships, the Swedish Cup and made her Champions League debut. In 2023, Goal.com ranked Sprung among the 25 most talented teenagers in women's football on its yearly NXGN list.

== Early life ==
Sprung was born and raised in the city of Helsingborg, located on the west coast in southwestern Sweden, only four kilometers from the Danish city of Helsingør. There she attended Kunskapsskolan Helsingborg before joining the natural science program at Malmö Idrottsgymnasium in August 2021.

From age seven to thirteen, Sprung was a competitive swimmer for Helsingborgs Simsällskap, in parallel with her football commitments. When time management eventually became an issue, she decided to drop swimming to focus on football. She later reflected that the discipline required to push herself during training sessions is a skill she acquired through swimming and suggested that it has helped her become a better footballer.

== Club career ==
=== Stattena IF (2012–2018) ===
Sprung took up football at age seven, when she joined Stattena IF in 2012. The club has seen notable players like Pia Sundhage, Caroline Seger and Zećira Mušović represent its colors. Sprung started out in Stattena's girls' teams but gradually played more with the boys as she grew up. At thirteen she made a few appearances for the women's senior team, as they had been relegated to Division 2 and were short on players.

=== Fortuna FF (2018–2020) ===
In autumn 2018, Sprung joined the youth teams of Rydebäck club Fortuna FF, who have a player development partnership with FC Rosengård. Starting in autumn 2019, she would train with Rosengård's under-15 to under-19 academy teams once a week.

=== FC Rosengård (2020–2025) ===
In spring 2020, after six months of weekly training sessions under the supervision of Rosengård's coaches, Sprung decided to commit to the club full time. On 14 March 2021, she made her senior team debut for Rosengård, appearing as a late substitute in a Swedish Cup game against Vittsjö. In August 2021, she signed a three-year contract with Rosengård. On 22 August, she made her Damallsvenskan debut against Örebro, when she came on as a substitute in the 67th minute. Playing as a left winger, she scored the final goal of the match 13 minutes later in a decisive 6–0 win.

On 31 August and 8 September, she made her first two appearances in the UEFA Women's Champions League qualifying rounds against German side Hoffenheim. Rosengård lost the home game in Malmö 0–3 in the first leg of a two-legged tie and only managed a 3–3 draw in Hoffenheim, thus failing to progress to the group stage. On 17 October, Sprung won her first national championship when Rosengård claimed their twelfth league title with two games to spare, meaning they had secured a place in the following year's Champions League. On 1 November 2021, Sprung appeared in Rosengård's starting line-up for the first time in the Damallsvenskan in the last home game of the season, a 3–1 victory over Eskilstuna in front of 2,548 spectators at Malmö IP.

Rosengård entered the 2022 preseason with an injury-decimated squad, which prompted head coach Renée Slegers to let several players try new positions. On 28 March 2022, in the league opener against newcomers Brommapojkarna, Sprung started as a striker, between Olivia Schough and Mimmi Wahlström, in a 4-3-3 formation. In the 19th minute she received the ball from Ria Öling and with one touch found the net by the far post for the game-winning goal in a 2–0 win.

On 8 May, Sprung scored her third goal of the season in a 3–0 away win over Umeå, who hadn't conceded a goal at home in nearly five hours before Sprung put a back-heel game-winner in the net following a corner kick in the 29th minute. On 22 May, Sprung started in the Swedish Cup final against Häcken, where she scored the 1–1 equaliser that would take the game to extra time. In the 62nd minute she struck the ball from long range and saw it sail past Häcken keeper Jennifer Falk to go in off the crossbar. Stefanie Sanders scored the deciding goal in the 100th minute, securing Rosengård's sixth cup title.

A knee injury kept Sprung sidelined for most of the remaining season, but on 24 October Rosengård once again became Swedish Champions with two games to spare, their thirteenth title overall. On 24 November Sprung returned to play in the Champions League group stage against Benfica. She appeared as a substitute in the 67th minute in a 1–0 away loss. On 7 December, she was brought on after a 63rd-minute substitution, when Rosengård again lost to the Portuguese side (1–3), this time in Malmö. She started in the last two matches, a 0–4 defeat to Bayern Munich on 15 December and a 6–0 loss against Barcelona on 22 December, in front of a crowd of 28,720 on Camp Nou. The final match was Rosengård's sixth defeat in as many games, meaning they failed to advance to the knockout phase.

Sprung experienced another setback in April 2023, when she suffered a stress fracture in the foot while on duty with the Sweden Under-19s against Iceland. The injury forced her to sit out most of the season; she only made five league appearances that year, along with another five in the Swedish Cup. Following the conclusion of Sprung's third Damallsvenskan campaign, defending champions Rosengård had to settle for seventh place, which ended a stretch of sixteen consecutive top-three league finishes.

14 November – 31 January, Sprung appeared in six group stage matches in the 2023–24 Champions League, where Rosengård faced Frankfurt, Benfica and Barcelona. Rosengård only managed one draw and five losses and subsequently failed to advance to the knockout phase. Sprung also appeared in the Swedish Cup during the winter months. On 30 March 2024, Rosengård were eliminated in the semi-final against Piteå, who went on to win the cup title. Rosengård started the 2024 Damallsvenskan with a historic eleven-game winning streak and on 17 June the club officially announced a signed contract extension with Sprung until December 2025.

Sprung changed her shirt number from 40 to 7 after the summer break and Rosengård extended their win streak in the league to 24 matches (including the final game of the previous campaign), tying the record set by Umeå (April 2005 – May 2006). On 4 October 2024, the club claimed its 14th national title (Sprung's third) with four games to spare.

On 23 March 2025, in the league opener against Piteå, Sprung made her 100th appearance for Rosengård (including the Champions League, Swedish Cup and pre-season friendlies). On 21–23 May, she appeared in two games when Rosengård contested the first edition of World Sevens Football. Rosengård lost 0–4 to both Manchester City and Bayern Munich. She did not appear in the third group stage match against Ajax that ended in a 0–2 defeat. Sprung started in nine of her twelve league appearances in the spring. During the summer break, Rosengård announced that she would be leaving the club.

=== Hammarby IF (2025–2026) ===
On 26 July 2025, Sprung was presented as a new signing for Stockholm-based club Hammarby IF, with a three-and-a-half-year contract stretching through 2028. The transfer fee remains undisclosed and Sprung received the number 10 shirt. On 8 August, she made her first league appearance representing Hammarby, when she came on as a substitute in the 59th minute against last-placed Alingsås IF, in a dominant 7–0 win.

=== US Sassuolo Calsio (2026-) ===
On 28 July, Sprung was unveiled by Italian club US Sassuolo Calcio, which competes in Serie A Femminile. The transfer fee paid to Hammarby IF is undisclosed. She signed a two-year contract. During pre-season, Sprung started in all of the club’s friendly matches. Her first official appearance for the club came in the Serie A Women’s Cup on 23 August, when she came on as a substitute in the 53rd minute of the group-stage match against AC Fiorentina. On 27 September, Sprung was named in the starting lineup for the opening match of Serie A Femminile against AS Roma.

== International career ==
=== Youth level (2021–present) ===
On 24 August 2020, Sprung received her first call-up for the Sweden Under-15 team from head coach Pär Lagerström. On 6 July 2021, she made her first international appearance in an under-16 friendly against Iceland, which ended in a 1–1 draw. On 14 September, she scored her first international goal against Germany, in a 1–5 defeat that was part of a three-nation tournament along with Norway. All in all, Sprung made eight appearances for Sweden U16 and U17 during the COVID-19 pandemic.

On 21 March 2022, 17-year-old Sprung received a call-up for the Sweden U19 squad from head coach Caroline Sjöblom to contest round 2 of the qualification for the 2022 UEFA Under-19 Championship. Sprung had already been called up for the U17 team but instead opted to play for U19.

On 6 April, Sweden defeated Poland 4–2 in the first match and proceeded to dismiss Croatia (4–0) and Denmark (2–0) to win the group and qualify for the final tournament, which was hosted by the Czech Republic, 27 June – 9 July. Sweden defeated Germany 2–0 in the first group stage match before besting England 1–0. Despite a 0–1 loss against Norway in the third match, Sweden advanced to the semi-finals, where they lost 0–1 to Spain. Sprung started in six of the seven matches, including the three qualifiers, and appeared as a striker in five of those games. No third place match was played.

From 1 to 11 April 2023, Sweden U19 contested qualification round 2 of the 2023 UEFA Under-19 Championship. Sprung started in the first two matches, but when a 5–0 win over Ukraine was followed by a 1–2 loss to Iceland, Sweden no longer had a chance to win the group and reach the final tournament. Sprung suffered a foot injury against Iceland and was not capped in the third match, a 0–2 defeat to hosts Denmark.

From 3 to 9 April 2024, Sweden U19 contested qualification round 2 of the 2024 UEFA Under-19 Championship. Sprung scored her second international goal in the 77th minute, in a 3–0 win over Hungary. After a goalless draw against Romania, Sprung scored her second goal in three games, in the 85th minute, when Sweden lost 1–4 to Germany in the group final. Sweden thereby failed to qualify for the final tournament. Sprung wore the number 8 shirt in her last fourteen appearances for Sweden U18 and U19.

On 21 May 2024, Sprung was called up to the Sweden U23 squad by head coach Martin Qvarmans Möller to contest a four-nation tournament in Växjö, 29 May – 4 June. The then 19-year-old Sprung played a full 90 minutes in the first match, a 3–0 victory over Australia. She did not appear when Sweden bested Poland 4–0, or when they defeated Germany 4–3 after penalties in the last game, granting Sweden the tournament victory.

On 24 February 2025, Sprung made her second appearance for Sweden U23, when she played the first 45 minutes in a 4–1 win over the Czech Republic in the group stage of WU23 Friendlies. As of 3 October 2025, she has made 31 age-group appearances for the national team - from the under-16s to the under-23s.

== Career statistics ==
=== Club ===
As of match played 3 October 2025

Appearances and goals by club, season and competition
| Club | Season | League | | | National cup (Note: Svenska Cupen) | | League cup | | Continental (Note: Champions League) | | Total | |
| Club | Season | Division | Apps | Goals | Apps | Goals | Apps | Goals | Apps | Goals | Apps | Goals |
|---|---|---|---|---|---|---|---|---|---|---|---|---|
| FC Rosengård | 2021 | Damallsvenskan | 8 | 1 | 7 | 1 | — | | 1 | 0 | 16 | 2 |
| FC Rosengård | 2022 | Damallsvenskan | 14 | 3 | 3 | 0 | — | | 3 | 0 | 20 | 3 |
| FC Rosengård | 2023 | Damallsvenskan | 5 | 0 | 5 | 2 | — | | 4 | 0 | 14 | 2 |
| FC Rosengård | 2024 | Damallsvenskan | 20 | 1 | 4 | 0 | — | | 2 | 0 | 26 | 1 |
| FC Rosengård | 2025 | Damallsvenskan | 12 | 1 | 0 | 0 | — | | — | | 12 | 1 |
| FC Rosengård | Total | | 59 | 6 | 19 | 3 | 0 | 0 | 10 | 0 | 88 | 9 |
| Hammarby IF | 2025 | Damallsvenskan | 8 | 2 | 0 | 0 | — | | 2 | 0 | 10 | 2 |
| Hammarby IF | Total | | 8 | 2 | 0 | 0 | 0 | 0 | 2 | 0 | 10 | 2 |
| Career total | | | 67 | 8 | 19 | 3 | 0 | 0 | 12 | 0 | 98 | 11 |

== Style of play ==
She's a special player. She's outstanding; there isn't a second on the pitch when Bea doesn't want to participate.

— Renée Slegers, former FC Rosengård head coach, when asked about her expectations of 17-year-old Sprung on 25 January 2023.

Sprung is typically played as a 'number 10' attacking midfielder, a position where she plays with intensity. She's not afraid to dribble past defenders or take shots from outside the penalty area. When struggling to find goal-scoring opportunities, she often delivers shot assists to her teammates.

== Honours ==
FC Rosengård

- Damallsvenskan: 2021, 2022, 2024
- Svenska Cupen: 2021–22

Individual

- The Football Clubs' Joint Organisation Malmö Junior Girl Footballer of the Year: 2021
- Sportbladet Damallsvenskan's Best Breakthrough of the Year: 2022 (nominated)
- Malmö Sports Association's Joint Organisation Promising Girl of the Year: 2022
- GOAL NXGN: 2023
