= Kazakhstan women's national under-19 football team =

Kazakhstan Women's U-19
- Association: Kazakhstan Football Federation
- Confederation: UEFA (Europe)
- Head coach: Orynbasar Däurenbekova
- FIFA code: KAZ

First international
- Hungary 13–0 Kazakhstan, (26 September 2007)

Biggest win
- Liechtenstein 0–7 Kazakhstan, (3 December 2024)

Biggest defeat
- Slovenia 14–0 Kazakhstan, (6 October 2018); Spain 14–0 Kazakhstan, (2 October 2019)

UEFA Women's Under-19 Championship
- Appearances: 0

FIFA U-20 Women's World Cup
- Appearances: 0

The Kazakhstan women's national under-19 football team represents Kazakhstan at the UEFA Women's Under-19 Championship and the FIFA U-20 Women's World Cup.

== Fixtures and results ==
Legend

Win Draw Lose Fixture

=== 2023 ===
2 December 2023 2024 UEFA Women's Under-19 Championship qualification Round 1	Slovakia	6–0	Kazakhstan	Stadionul CNAF, Buftea
11:00	Vargová 3' (pen.); Straková 17'; Hrúziková 20', 21', 54'; Cabúková 77'	Report		Referee: Cansu Tryak (Turkey)

5 December 2023 2024 UEFA Women's Under-19 Championship qualification Round 1	Kazakhstan	0–1	Romania	Stadionul CNAF, Buftea
10:00		Report	Ouatu 42'	Referee: Nanna Løf Andersen (Denmark)

== History ==
=== UEFA Women's Under-19 Championship ===
The Kazakh team has never qualified for the UEFA Women's Under-19 Championship.

Year	Result	Matches	Wins	Draws	Losses	GF	GA
Two-legged final 1998	did not Qualify						
(Sweden) 1999	did not Qualify						
(France) 2000	did not Qualify						
(Norway) 2001	did not Qualify						
(Sweden) 2002	did not Qualify						
(Germany) 2003	did not Qualify						
(Finland) 2004	did not Qualify						
(Hungary) 2005	did not Qualify						
(Switzerland) 2006	did not Qualify						
(Iceland) 2007	did not Qualify						
(France) 2008	did not Qualify						
(Belarus) 2009	did not Qualify						
(North Macedonia) 2010	did not Qualify						
(Italy) 2011	did not Qualify						
(Turkey) 2012	did not Qualify						
(Wales) 2013	did not Qualify						
(Norway) 2014	did not Qualify						
(Israel) 2015	did not Qualify						
(Slovakia) 2016	did not Qualify						
(Northern Ireland) 2017	did not Qualify						
(Switzerland) 2018	did not Qualify						
(Scotland) 2019	did not Qualify						
(Georgia (country)) ~~2020~~	Cancelled due to the COVID-19 pandemic						
(Belarus) ~~2021~~	Cancelled due to the COVID-19 pandemic						
(Czech Republic) 2022	did not qualify						
(Belgium) 2023	did not qualify						
(Lithuania) 2024	did not qualify						
(Poland) 2025	did not qualify						
(Bosnia and Herzegovina) 2026	did not qualify						
(Hungary) 2027	TBD						
Total	0/26	0	0	0	0	0	0

== See also ==
- Kazakhstan women's national football team
- Kazakhstan women's national under-17 football team
- FIFA U-20 Women's World Cup
- UEFA Women's Under-19 Championship
