= Slovakia women's national under-19 football team =

National association football team

Slovakia Women's U-19
- Association: Slovak Football Association
- Confederation: UEFA (Europe)
- FIFA code: SVK

First international
- Slovakia 2–2 Ukraine, (2 October 2002)

Biggest win
- Slovakia 11–0 Liechtenstein, (25 November 2025)

Biggest defeat
- Denmark 10–1 Slovakia, (22 October 2016)

UEFA Women's Under-19 Championship
- Appearances: 1 (first in 2016)
- Best result: Group Stage: (2016)

FIFA U-20 Women's World Cup
- Appearances: 0

The Slovak women's national under-19 football team represents Slovakia at the UEFA Women's Under-19 Championship and the FIFA U-20 Women's World Cup.

== History ==
=== UEFA Women's Under-19 Championship ===
The Slovak team has qualified once for the UEFA Women's Under-19 Championship in 2016 when they hosted the tournament.

Year	Result	Matches	Wins	Draws	Losses	GF	GA
Two-legged final 1998	did not Qualify						
(Sweden) 1999	did not Qualify						
(France) 2000	did not Qualify						
(Norway) 2001	did not Qualify						
(Sweden) 2002	did not Qualify						
(Germany) 2003	did not Qualify						
(Finland) 2004	did not Qualify						
(Hungary) 2005	did not Qualify						
(Switzerland) 2006	did not Qualify						
(Iceland) 2007	did not Qualify						
(France) 2008	did not Qualify						
(Belarus) 2009	did not Qualify						
(North Macedonia) 2010	did not Qualify						
(Italy) 2011	did not Qualify						
(Turkey) 2012	did not Qualify						
(Wales) 2013	did not Qualify						
(Norway) 2014	did not Qualify						
(Israel) 2015	did not Qualify						
(Slovakia) 2016	Group-stage	3	0	1	2	0	12
(Northern Ireland) 2017	did not qualify						
(Switzerland) 2018	did not qualify						
(Scotland) 2019	did not qualify						
(Georgia (country)) ~~2020~~	Cancelled due to the COVID-19 pandemic						
(Belarus) ~~2021~~	Cancelled due to the COVID-19 pandemic						
(Czech Republic) 2022	did not qualify						
(Belgium) 2023	did not qualify						
(Lithuania) 2024	did not qualify						
(Poland) 2025	did not qualify						
(Bosnia and Herzegovina) 2026	did not qualify						
(Hungary) 2027	TBD						
Total	1/26	3	0	1	2	0	12

== See also ==
- Slovakia women's national football team
- Slovakia women's national under-17 football team
- FIFA U-20 Women's World Cup
- UEFA Women's Under-19 Championship
