= Armenia women's national under-19 football team =

National sports team

Armenia Women's U-19
- Association: Football Federation of Armenia
- Confederation: UEFA (Europe)
- Head coach: Mariam Stepanyan
- FIFA code: ARM

First international
- Scotland 13–0 Armenia, (27 September 2007)

Biggest win
- Armenia 1–0 Luxembourg, (30 October 2023) Turkey 3–3 Armenia, (30 September 2008)

Biggest defeat
- Belgium 17–0 Armenia, (5 October 2019)

UEFA Women's Under-19 Championship
- Appearances: 0

FIFA U-20 Women's World Cup
- Appearances: 0

The Armenian women's national under-19 football team represents Armenia at the UEFA Women's Under-19 Championship and the FIFA U-20 Women's World Cup.

== History ==
On October 30, in the last round of the qualifying tournament of the UEFA European Women's U-19 Championship, the Armenian U-19 national team hosted the Luxembourg women's national under-19 football team Luxembourg women's national under-19 football team and won with a score of 1:0. This was the Armenian Women's U-19 team's first win in an official match in 14 years.

Lusine Kostanyan scored the only goal of the match for our national team in the 40th minute. In the other group match, North Macedonia and Ukraine teams competed. Ukraine's U-19 national team won 2:1 and won the tournament.

After the last round, the standings looked like this:

UKRUkraine - 9 points

MKDNorth Macedonia – 6 points

ARMArmenia - 3 points

LUX Luxembourg – 0 points

=== UEFA Women's Under-19 Championship ===
The Armenian team has never qualified for the UEFA Women's Under-19 Championship.

Year	Result	Matches	Wins	Draws	Losses	GF	GA
Two-legged final 1998	did not Qualify						
(Sweden) 1999	did not Qualify						
(France) 2000	did not Qualify						
(Norway) 2001	did not Qualify						
(Sweden) 2002	did not Qualify						
(Germany) 2003	did not Qualify						
(Finland) 2004	did not Qualify						
(Hungary) 2005	did not Qualify						
(Switzerland) 2006	did not Qualify						
(Iceland) 2007	did not Qualify						
(France) 2008	did not Qualify						
(Belarus) 2009	did not Qualify						
(North Macedonia) 2010	did not Qualify						
(Italy) 2011	did not Qualify						
(Turkey) 2012	did not Qualify						
(Wales) 2013	did not Qualify						
(Norway) 2014	did not Qualify						
(Israel) 2015	did not Qualify						
(Slovakia) 2016	did not Qualify						
(Northern Ireland) 2017	did not Qualify						
(Switzerland) 2018	did not Qualify						
(Scotland) 2019	did not Qualify						
(Georgia (country)) ~~2020~~	Cancelled due to the COVID-19 pandemic						
(Belarus) ~~2021~~	Cancelled due to the COVID-19 pandemic						
(Czech Republic) 2022	did not qualify						
(Belgium) 2023	did not qualify						
(Lithuania) 2024	did not qualify						
(Poland) 2025	did not qualify						
(Bosnia and Herzegovina) 2026	did not qualify						
(Hungary) 2027	TBD						
Total	0/26	0	0	0	0	0	0

== See also ==
- Armenia women's national football team
- Armenia women's national under-17 football team
- FIFA U-20 Women's World Cup
- UEFA Women's Under-19 Championship
