= Katla Tryggvadóttir =

Icelandic footballer

Personal information
- Date of birth: 5 May 2005 (age 21)
- Position: Midfielder

Team information
- Current team: Fiorentina
- Number: 27

Senior career*
Years	Team	Apps	(Gls)
2021	Valur Reykjavík	5	(0)
2022–2023	Þróttur Reykjavík	33	(13)
2024–2025	Kristianstad	32	(10)
2025–	Fiorentina	2	(1)

International career^{‡}
2021–2022	Iceland U16	3	(0)
2022–2023	Iceland U17	6	(2)
2023–2024	Iceland U18	2	(0)
2024–2025	Iceland U19	16	(9)
2024–	Iceland	15	(1)
- * Club domestic league appearances and goals as of 18 October 2025 ‡ National team caps and goals as of 15 October 2026

Katla Tryggvadóttir (born 5 May 2005) is an Icelandic footballer who plays as a midfielder for Serie A club Fiorentina and for the Iceland national team. She has represented Iceland as a youth international since she was 16 years old.

== International career ==
Katla was part of Iceland's 23-player squad for the UEFA Women's Euro 2025 in Switzerland.

== Career statistics ==
=== International ===
As of 13 October 2026

Scores and results list Finland's goal tally first, score column indicates score after each Tryggvadóttir goal.

List of international goals scored by Katla Tryggvadóttir
No.	Date	Venue	Cap	Opponent	Score	Result	Competition
1	13 October 2026	Laugardalsvöllur, Reykjavík, Iceland	15	Croatia	3–0	5–0	2027 FIFA Women's World Cup play-offs
