= Aurélie Reynders =

Belgian footballer (born 2007)

Personal information
- Full name: Aurélie Danique Reynders
- Date of birth: 8 July 2007 (age 19)
- Position: Midfielder

Team information
- Current team: Paris FC
- Number: 34

Senior career*
Years	Team	Apps	(Gls)
2023–2026	OH Leuven	74	(22)
2026–	Paris FC	0	(0)

International career
2025–	Belgium	2	(0)
- * Club domestic league appearances and goals as of 19:48, 19 July 2026 (UTC)

Aurélie Danique Reynders (born 8 July 2007) is a Belgian professional footballer who plays as a midfielder for Première Ligue club Paris FC and the Belgium national team. She has previously played for Belgian Women's Super League club Oud-Heverlee Leuven.

== Club career ==
=== OH Leuven ===
Reynders began her professional career with Oud-Heverlee Leuven (OH Leuven) in the Belgian Women's Super League during the 2023–24 season, making 25 appearances and scoring six goals. In the 2024–25 season, she made 24 appearances, including 22 starts, and recorded seven goals.

During the 2025–26 season, Reynders made 15 appearances, starting 14 matches, and scored five goals. She also made eight appearance for OH Leuven in the 2025–2026 UEFA Women's Champions League, recording one assist and nine shots.

=== Paris FC ===
On 19 July 2026, French Première Ligue club Paris FC announced the signing of Reynders on a four-year deal until 2030.

== International career ==
Reynders represented Belgium as a member of the under-19 team during qualification for the 2024 UEFA Women's Under-19 Championship.

She made her senior debut for the Belgium women's national team on 24 October 2025 in a UEFA Women's Nations League match against the Republic of Ireland. She earned her second appearance on 28 November 2025 in a friendly match against Switzerland.
