= Iceland women's national under-19 football team =

Iceland Women's U-19
- Association: Football Association of Iceland
- Confederation: UEFA (Europe)
- Head coach: Halldór Jón Sigurdsson
- FIFA code: ISL

First international
- Bosnia and Herzegovina 0–1 Iceland, (2 October 2002)

Biggest win
- Iceland 10–0 Kazakhstan, (17 September 2016)

Biggest defeat
- Iceland 0–6 Austria, (4 December 2023)

UEFA Women's Under-19 Championship
- Appearances: 4 (first in 2007)
- Best result: Group Stage: (2007, 2009, 2023, 2026)

FIFA U-20 Women's World Cup
- Appearances: 0

The Icelandic women's national under-19 football team represents Iceland at the UEFA Women's Under-19 Championship and the FIFA U-20 Women's World Cup.

== History ==
=== UEFA Women's Under-19 Championship ===
The Icelandic team has qualified for the UEFA Women's Under-19 Championship three times, but stranded in the group stage each time.

Year	Result	Matches	Wins	Draws	Losses	GF	GA
Two-legged final 1998	did not qualify						
(Sweden) 1999	did not qualify						
(France) 2000	did not qualify						
(Norway) 2001	did not qualify						
(Sweden) 2002	did not qualify						
(Germany) 2003	did not qualify						
(Finland) 2004	did not qualify						
(Hungary) 2005	did not qualify						
(Switzerland) 2006	did not qualify						
(Iceland) 2007	Group-stage	3	0	0	3	3	11
(France) 2008	did not qualify						
(Belarus) 2009	Group-stage	3	0	1	2	1	6
(North Macedonia) 2010	did not qualify						
(Italy) 2011	did not qualify						
(Turkey) 2012	did not qualify						
(Wales) 2013	did not qualify						
(Norway) 2014	did not qualify						
(Israel) 2015	did not qualify						
(Slovakia) 2016	did not qualify						
(Northern Ireland) 2017	did not qualify						
(Switzerland) 2018	did not qualify						
(Scotland) 2019	did not qualify						
(Georgia (country)) ~~2020~~	Cancelled due to the COVID-19 pandemic						
(Belarus) ~~2021~~	Cancelled due to the COVID-19 pandemic						
(Czech Republic) 2022	did not qualify						
(Belgium) 2023	Group-stage	3	1	0	2	3	6
(Lithuania) 2024	did not qualify						
(Poland) 2025	did not qualify						
(Bosnia and Herzegovina) 2026	Group-stage	3	0	0	3	3	11
(Hungary) 2027	TBD						
Total	4/27	12	1	1	10	10	34

== See also ==
- Iceland women's national football team
- Iceland women's national under-17 football team
- FIFA U-20 Women's World Cup
- UEFA Women's Under-19 Championship
