= Laura Donghi =

Italian former football midfielder

Personal information
- Full name: Laura Donghi
- Date of birth: 21 November 1980 (age 45)
- Place of birth: Milan, Italy
- Height: 1.67 m (5 ft 6 in)
- Position: Midfielder

Senior career*
Years	Team	Apps	(Gls)
1996–2010	Fiammamonza	367	(35)
2010–2014	Chiasiellis	106	(4)
- * Club domestic league appearances and goals

Laura Donghi (born 21 November 1980) is an Italian former football midfielder who played for Fiammamonza and Calcio Chiasiellis of Serie A. With Fiammamonza she also played in the UEFA Women's Cup.
