= Amēlija Lipšāne =

Latvian footballer (born 2005)

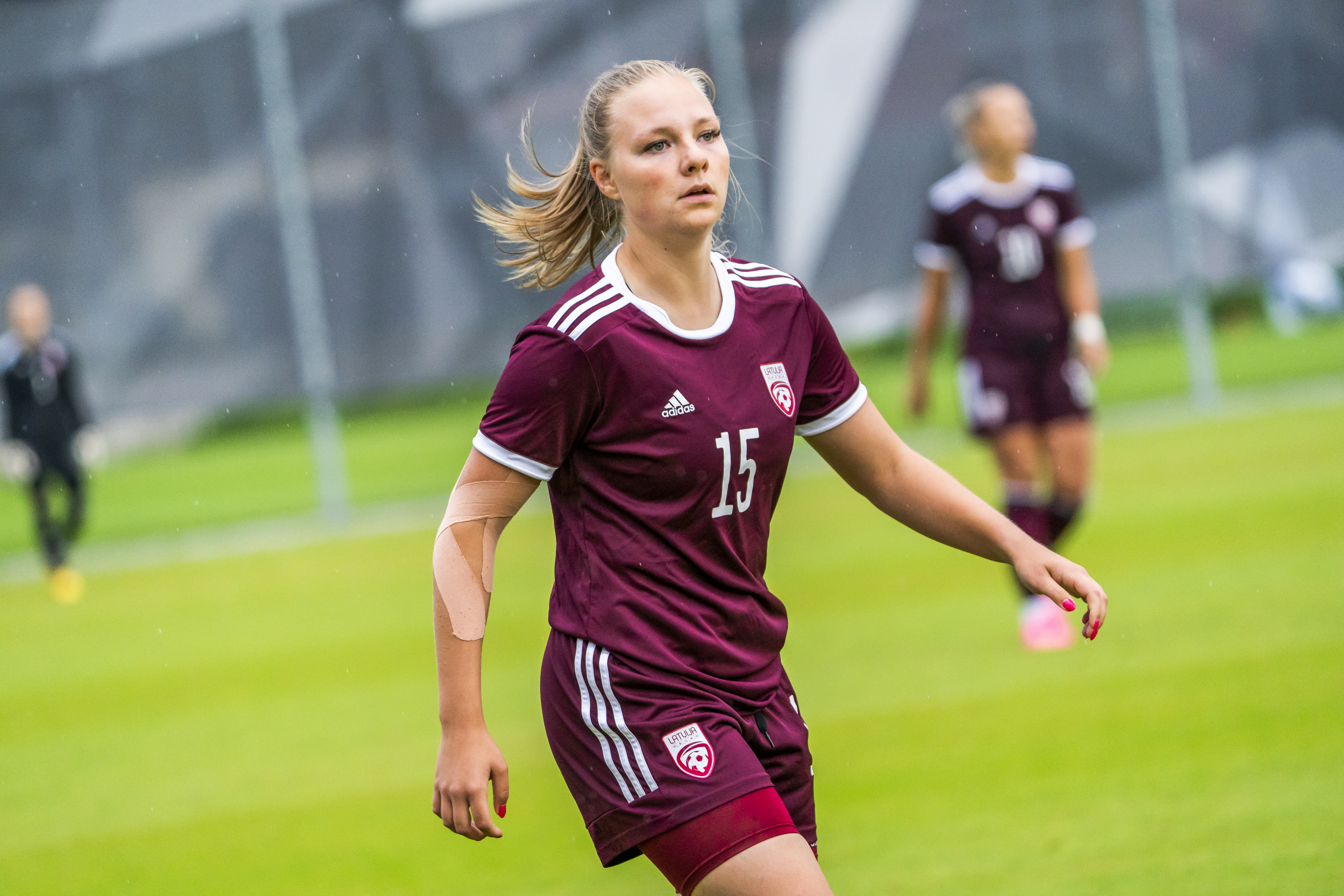

Personal information
- Full name: Amēlija Lipšāne
- Date of birth: 31 March 2005 (age 21)
- Place of birth: Latvia,
- Position: Midfielder

Team information
- Current team: FS Metta
- Number: 10

Youth career
- 2014-2019: FS Metta

Senior career*
Years	Team	Apps	(Gls)
2019-	FS Metta		

International career^{‡}
2018–2019	Latvia U15	5	(0)
2020–2022	Latvia U17	6	(1)
2022-2023	Latvia U19	10	(1)
2023-	Latvia	8	(0)
- * Club domestic league appearances and goals as of 12:19, 18 July 2023 (UTC) ‡ National team caps and goals as of 12:19, 12 August 2024 (UTC)

Amēlija Lipšāne (born 31 March 2005) is a Latvian footballer who plays as a midfielder and has appeared for the Latvia women's national team.

== International career ==
Lipšāne made her debut for the Latvia national team in a Friendly match against Azerbaijan. Since then, she has been a part of several key tournaments. She participated in the UEFA Women's Nations League, where she played in multiple matches during the 2023–2024 season.

In the UEFA Women's European Qualifiers, she has been recognized for her performance and continues to represent Latvia at the international level. Her national team number is 13, and she plays a crucial role in the midfield, contributing to both defensive and offensive plays.

== Club career ==
While details about her club career are less documented, Lipšāne is known to have played in various local and regional competitions, representing Latvia in youth and senior categories. Her development in the sport has been supported by the Latvian Football Federation, which continues to nurture young talents like her.
