= Liechtenstein women's national under-19 football team =

Liechtenstein Women's U-19
- Association: Liechtenstein Football Association
- Confederation: UEFA (Europe)
- FIFA code: LIE

First international
- Denmark 11–0 Liechtenstein, (28 August 2018)

Biggest win
- Liechtenstein 0–0 Latvia, (25 October 2021); Lithuania 0–0 Liechtenstein, (11 November 2022)

Biggest defeat
- Serbia 15–0 Liechtenstein, (31 August 2018)

UEFA Women's Under-19 Championship
- Appearances: 0

FIFA U-20 Women's World Cup
- Appearances: 0

The Liechtenstein women's national under-19 football team represents Liechtenstein at the UEFA Women's Under-19 Championship and the FIFA U-20 Women's World Cup.

== History ==
=== UEFA Women's Under-19 Championship ===
The Liechtenstein U-19 team has never qualified for the UEFA Women's Under-19 Championship.

Year	Result	Matches	Wins	Draws	Losses	GF	GA
Two-legged final 1998	did not participate						
(Sweden) 1999	did not participate						
(France) 2000	did not participate						
(Norway) 2001	did not participate						
(Sweden) 2002	did not participate						
(Germany) 2003	did not participate						
(Finland) 2004	did not participate						
(Hungary) 2005	did not participate						
(Switzerland) 2006	did not participate						
(Iceland) 2007	did not participate						
(France) 2008	did not participate						
(Belarus) 2009	did not participate						
(North Macedonia) 2010	did not participate						
(Italy) 2011	did not participate						
(Turkey) 2012	did not participate						
(Wales) 2013	did not participate						
(Norway) 2014	did not participate						
(Israel) 2015	did not participate						
(Slovakia) 2016	did not participate						
(Northern Ireland) 2017	did not participate						
(Switzerland) 2018	did not qualify						
(Scotland) 2019	did not qualify						
(Georgia (country)) ~~2020~~	Cancelled due to the COVID-19 pandemic						
(Belarus) ~~2021~~	Cancelled due to the COVID-19 pandemic						
(Czech Republic) 2022	did not qualify						
(Belgium) 2023	did not qualify						
(Lithuania) 2024	did not participate						
(Poland) 2025	Did not qualify						
(Bosnia and Herzegovina) 2026	Did not qualify						
(Hungary) 2027	TBD						
Total	0/26	0	0	0	0	0	0

== See also ==
- Liechtenstein women's national football team
- Liechtenstein women's national under-17 football team
- FIFA U-20 Women's World Cup
- UEFA Women's Under-19 Championship
