= Bosnia and Herzegovina women's national under-19 football team =

Bosnia and Herzegovina
- Association: Football Federation of Bosnia and Herzegovina
- Confederation: UEFA (Europe)
- Head coach: Jelena Milović, current as of June 2026
- Home stadium: BiH FA Training Centre
- FIFA code: BIH
First colours	Second colours

Biggest win
- Bosnia and Herzegovina 13–0 Armenia (Mostar, Bosnia and Herzegovina; 19 October 2021)

Biggest defeat
- Bosnia and Herzegovina 0–11 Belgium (Podolsk, Russia; 15 October 2001)

UEFA Women's Under-19 Championship
- Appearances: 1 (first in 2026)
- Best result: Group Stage (2026)

The Bosnia and Herzegovina women's national under-19 football team represents Bosnia and Herzegovina in international football in under-19 categories and is controlled by the Football Association of Bosnia and Herzegovina.

== Competitive record ==
=== UEFA Women's U19 Championship record ===
UEFA Women's U19 Championship record									UEFA Women's U19 Championship Qualification record					
Year	Round	Position	Pld	W	D	L	GF	GA	Pld	W	D	L	GF	GA
(Sweden) 2002	Did not qualify								6	2	1	3	5	21
(Germany) 2003	Did not qualify								3	0	0	3	0	7
(Finland) 2004	Did not qualify								3	0	0	3	0	16
(Hungary) 2005	Did not qualify								3	0	0	3	1	13
(Switzerland) 2006	Did not qualify								3	1	0	2	12	11
(Iceland) 2007	Did not qualify								3	0	0	3	1	17
(France) 2008	Did not qualify								3	1	0	2	2	9
(Belarus) 2009	Did not qualify								3	1	0	2	13	13
(North Macedonia) 2010	Did not qualify								6	2	0	4	10	20
(Italy) 2011	Did not qualify								3	0	0	3	0	9
(Turkey) 2012	Did not qualify								3	1	0	2	2	16
(Wales) 2013	Did not qualify								3	1	0	2	3	7
(Norway) 2014	Did not qualify								3	1	0	2	5	4
(Israel) 2015	Did not qualify								3	1	1	1	5	4
(Slovakia) 2016	Did not qualify								3	1	0	2	1	7
(Northern Ireland) 2017	Did not qualify								3	1	0	2	2	8
(Switzerland) 2018	Did not qualify								3	0	1	2	2	15
(Scotland) 2019	Did not qualify								3	1	0	2	1	12
(Czech Republic) 2022	Did not qualify								6	3	0	3	19	16
(Belgium) 2023	Did not qualify								5	2	0	3	10	13
(Lithuania) 2024	Did not qualify								5	2	1	2	14	17
(Poland) 2025	Did not qualify								5	1	1	3	7	5
(Bosnia and Herzegovina) 2026	Group-Stage	8th	3	0	0	3	1	15	6	3	1	2	14	17
Total	GS	8th	3	0	0	3	1	15	95	26	6	64	137	294

== 2026 UEFA Women's Under-19 Championship ==
=== Group A ===
Pos	Team	Pld	W	D	L	GF	GA	GD	Pts	Qualification
1	Germany	3	2	1	0	8	1	+7	7	Knockout stage
2	Sweden	3	2	0	1	6	2	+4	6	Knockout stage
3	Poland	3	1	1	1	6	3	+3	4	
4	Bosnia and Herzegovina (H)	3	0	0	3	1	15	−14	0	

Source: UEFA
Rules for classification: Group stage tiebreakers
(H) Hosts
27 June 2026
17:00

Bosnia and Herzegovina	0–5	Germany
	Report	Rintzner 36'; Sträßer 49', 57'; Memminger 71'; Bäcker 90+5'

Bosnia and Herzegovina FA Training Centre, Zenica
Attendance: 706
Referee: Michaela Pachtová (Czech Republic)

30 June 2026
17:00

Bosnia and Herzegovina	0–5	Sweden
	Report	Bartholdson 17'; Andersson Widén 31', 45+3'; Golubović 80' (o.g.); Ekberg 83'

Bilino Polje Stadium, Zenica
Referee: Emily Heaslip (England)

3 July 2026
17:00

Poland	5–1	Bosnia and Herzegovina
Araśniewicz 9', 44'; Świrska 21', 73'; Witek 82'	Report	Mirković 70'

Stadion Grbavica, Sarajevo
Referee: Tatyana Sorokopudova (Kazakhstan)

== Current squad ==
The following players were called up for friendly matches against Slovenia in June 2026.

No.	Pos.	Player	Date of birth (age)	Caps	Goals	Club
1	GK	Nadija Golubović				(Football Association of Bosnia and Herzegovina) SFK 2000
2	GK	Marija Mihaela Maslać				(Football Association of Bosnia and Herzegovina) ŽFK Leotar Trebinje
	DF	Lejla Burek				(Swedish Football Association) Malmö FF
	DF	Leyla Tucaković				(United States Soccer Federation) FC Bay Area Surf
	DF	Arijana Hafizović				(Norwegian Football Federation) Strømsgodset TF
	DF	Dragana Marinković				(Football Association of Bosnia and Herzegovina) ŽFK Radnik BetOle Bijeljina
5	DF	Natalija Mirković				(Football Association of Bosnia and Herzegovina) SFK 2000
	DF	Anđelina Laketić				(Football Association of Bosnia and Herzegovina) ŽFK Radnik BetOle Bijeljina
18	DF	Hana Mešan				(Football Association of Bosnia and Herzegovina) SFK 2000
20	DF	Amila Abdukić				(Football Association of Bosnia and Herzegovina) SFK 2000
	MF	Mellina Omeragić				(Swiss Football Association) Servette Chenois feminin
6	MF	Bogdana Milićević				(Football Association of Bosnia and Herzegovina) ŽFK Radnik BetOle Bijeljina
	MF	Nađa Ćerić				(Norwegian Football Federation) KFUM Kvinner Oslo
	MF	Laureen Scharfenberg				(German Football Association) SC Freiburg
7	MF	Zerina Marković				(United States Soccer Federation) Memphis Tigers
	MF	Ana Jurić				(Football Association of Bosnia and Herzegovina) ŽFK Leotar Trebinje
15	MF	Velida Aličković				(German Football Association) 1. FSV Mainz 05
8	MF	Uma Hadžihajdarević				(Football Association of Bosnia and Herzegovina) SFK 2000
	FW	Amina Krpo				(Norwegian Football Federation) Vålerenga
10	FW	Una Rankić (c)				(Swiss Football Association) FC Basel 1893 Frauen
9	FW	Irina Erkić				(Football Association of Bosnia and Herzegovina) ŽFK Radnik BetOle Bijeljina
16	FW	Sara Mujdžić				(French Football Federation) AS Saint Etienne
23	FW	Diana Memagić				(Swiss Football Association) FC St. Gallen 1979

== Recent call ups ==
The following players were called up for 2017 UEFA Women's Under-19 Championship qualification.

No.	Pos.	Player	Date of birth (age)	Caps	Goals	Club
1		Jelena Gvozderac				(Football Association of Bosnia and Herzegovina) Banja Luka
2		Albina Butković	October 3, 1998 (age 28)			(Football Association of Bosnia and Herzegovina) Fortuna Živinice
3		Andrea Crnobrnja	October 15, 1998 (age 28)			(Football Association of Bosnia and Herzegovina) Mladost Poljavnice
4		Dženita Močević	June 4, 1999 (age 27)			
5		Ana Bojanić	May 21, 1998 (age 28)			(Football Association of Bosnia and Herzegovina) Emina Mostar
6		Branka Bagarić	February 8, 2000 (age 26)			(Football Association of Bosnia and Herzegovina) Tomislavgrad
7		Lamija Rovčanin	October 25, 1999 (age 27)			(Swedish Football Association) QBIK Karlstad
8		Mia Kuljanin	May 10, 1999 (age 27)			(Football Association of Bosnia and Herzegovina) SFK 2000 Sarajevo
9		Ajla Pašalić	December 28, 1998 (age 27)			(Royal Dutch Football Association) Gelre
10		Merjema Medić	17 October 1999 (age 27)			(Football Association of Bosnia and Herzegovina) SFK 2000 Sarajevo
11		Aldina Škahić	March 8, 1999 (age 27)			(Football Association of Bosnia and Herzegovina) Lokomotiva Brčko
12		Emina Omerović	March 20, 1999 (age 27)			(Football Association of Bosnia and Herzegovina) Fortuna Živinice
13		Marija Radoš	September 8, 1999 (age 27)			(Football Association of Bosnia and Herzegovina) Tomislavgrad
14		Anđela Kodžo	October 31, 1998 (age 28)			(Football Association of Bosnia and Herzegovina) Banja Luka
15		Anja Limanović	March 26, 1999 (age 27)			(Football Association of Bosnia and Herzegovina) SFK 2000 Sarajevo
16		Dejana Ćosić	January 2, 1999 (age 27)			(Football Association of Bosnia and Herzegovina) Gradina
17		Vildana Hodžić	January 8, 1999 (age 27)			(Football Association of Bosnia and Herzegovina) Fortuna Živinice
18		Nermina Kantić	August 7, 1999 (age 27)			(Football Association of Bosnia and Herzegovina) Borac Jelah

== Former head coaches ==
- Ilija Lucić
- Dragan Jevtić

== See also ==
- Bosnia and Herzegovina women's national football team
- Bosnia and Herzegovina women's national under-17 football team
- Football Association of Bosnia and Herzegovina
- UEFA Women's Championship
- UEFA Women's Under-19 Championship
- FIFA U-20 Women's World Cup
