= Ukraine women's national under-19 football team =

National U-19 association football team

Ukraine Under-19
- Association: Football Federation of Ukraine
- Confederation: UEFA (Europe)
- Head coach: Nataliya Zinchenko
- FIFA code: UKR
First colours	Second colours

The Ukraine women's national under-19 football team represents Ukraine women in international football in the UEFA Women's Under-19 Championship and finals of the FIFA World Youth Championship (under-20). It is controlled by Football Federation of Ukraine, the governing body for football in Ukraine.

== History ==
=== UEFA Women's Under-19 Championship ===
The Ukraine U-19 team has never qualified for the UEFA Women's Under-19 Championship.

Year	Result	Matches	Wins	Draws	Losses	GF	GA
Two-legged final 1998	did not qualify						
(Sweden) 1999	did not qualify						
(France) 2000	did not qualify						
(Norway) 2001	did not qualify						
(Sweden) 2002	did not qualify						
(Germany) 2003	did not qualify						
(Finland) 2004	did not qualify						
(Hungary) 2005	did not qualify						
(Switzerland) 2006	did not qualify						
(Iceland) 2007	did not qualify						
(France) 2008	did not qualify						
(Belarus) 2009	did not qualify						
(North Macedonia) 2010	did not qualify						
(Italy) 2011	did not qualify						
(Turkey) 2012	did not qualify						
(Wales) 2013	did not qualify						
(Norway) 2014	did not qualify						
(Israel) 2015	did not qualify						
(Slovakia) 2016	did not qualify						
(Northern Ireland) 2017	did not qualify						
(Switzerland) 2018	did not qualify						
(Scotland) 2019	did not qualify						
(Georgia (country)) ~~2020~~	Cancelled due to the COVID-19 pandemic						
(Belarus) ~~2021~~	Cancelled due to the COVID-19 pandemic						
(Czech Republic) 2022	did not qualify						
(Belgium) 2023	did not qualify						
(Lithuania) 2024	did not qualify						
(Poland) 2025	did not qualify						
(Bosnia and Herzegovina) 2026	did not qualify						
(Hungary) 2027	TBD						
Total	0/26	0	0	0	0	0	0

== Current team ==
No.	Pos.	Player	Date of birth (age)	Caps	Goals	Club
1	GK	Marina Dudnik	14 March 2004 (age 22)			EMS-Podillya
12	GK	Varvara Novikova	11 June 2005 (age 21)			Ladomyr
23	GK	Kateryna Boklach	16 January 2004 (age 22)	3		Hayasa
3	DF	Olena Yefimchuk	30 March 2005 (age 21)	1		
4	DF	Ruslana Levchenko	1 October 2004 (age 22)	3		Kryvbas
5	DF	Tetiana Bondarenko	23 January 2005 (age 21)			Dynamo Kyiv
6	DF	Daria Borysiuk	9 June 2004 (age 22)	3		EMC Podolie
9	DF	Lesia Olkhova	9 January 2004 (age 22)	3		Kryvbas
14	DF	Valeriia Hresa	28 November 2005 (age 20)	2		
22	DF	Sofiia Lutsan	26 October 2005 (age 21)	2		
10	MF	Viktoriia Radionova	13 June 2005 (age 21)	3		Vorskla Poltava
11	MF	Myroslava Nevar	8 January 2005 (age 21)	3		Ladomir
13	MF	Diliara Bondarieva	5 November 2005 (age 21)	2		EMS-Podillya
15	MF	Viktoriia Lavreniuk	20 November 2003 (age 22)	2		
16	MF	Bozhena Dub	6 April 2005 (age 21)			
17	MF	Mariia Amel Taleb	17 January 2004 (age 22)	3		Sampdoria
18	MF	Daiana Semkiv	29 July 2004 (age 22)	3		Kryvbas
19	MF	Yelyzaveta Molodiuk	24 July 2004 (age 22)	3		Shakhtar Donetsk
7	FW	Liliana Serbuk	27 September 2005 (age 21)	3		Kolos Kovalivka
20	FW	Inna Hlushchenko	12 May 2004 (age 22)	3		Reims

== See also ==
- Ukraine (Senior) team
