= 1999 UEFA Women's Under-18 Championship =

Tournament details
- Host country: Sweden
- Dates: 3–7 August
- Teams: 4 (from 1 confederation)
- Venue: 3 (in 3 host cities)

Final positions
- Champions: Sweden (1st title)
- Runners-up: Germany
- Third place: Italy
- Fourth place: Norway

Tournament statistics
- Matches played: 6
- Goals scored: 12 (2 per match)

The 1999 UEFA Women's Under-18 Championship was held between 3 August 1999 and 7 August 1999. It was the second edition of the UEFA European Women's Under-18 Championship. 27 teams competed in the preliminary rounds. Four teams qualified for the final stage of the tournament which consisted of a round-robin group stage. Sweden topped the group by having a better head-to-head record against Germany who finished level on points with Sweden. This was Sweden's first UEFA European Women's Under-18 Championship victory.

== Group stage ==
Team	Pld	W	D	L	GF	GA	GD	Pts
Sweden	3	2	0	1	4	4	0	6 (Note: Head-to-head result : Germany 0–1 Sweden.)
Germany	3	2	0	1	4	2	+2	6
Italy	3	1	1	1	3	3	0	4
Norway	3	0	1	2	2	4	−2	1

Source: rsssf.com
Rules for classification: 1) Head-to-head result
Notes:
3 August 1999

Germany	2–1	Norway
Müller 68'; Schäpertöns 74'	(Report)	Hansen 79'

Furehov Stadium, Åhus

3 August 1999

Sweden	1–3	Italy
Albertsen 38'	(Report)	Donghi 8'; Sorvillo 25'; Sodini 41'

Furehov Stadium, Åhus

5 August 1999

Germany	0–1	Sweden
	(Report)	Hasselberg 82'

Strandängen Stadium, Bromölla

5 August 1999

Norway	0–0	Italy
	(Report)

Strandängen Stadium, Bromölla

7 August 1999

Italy	0–2	Germany
	(Report)	Schäpertöns 9'; Wörle 88'

Furehov Stadium, Åhus

7 August 1999

Norway	1–2	Sweden
Rønning 7'	(Report)	Hasselberg 19'; Mats 24'

Kristianstad Idrottspark, Kristianstad
