= 1998 UEFA Women's Under-18 Championship =

Final positions
- Champions: Denmark (1st title)
- Runners-up: France

The 1998 UEFA Women's Under-18 Championship was held between 11 July 1998 and 18 July 1998. It was the first edition of the UEFA European Women's Under-18 Championship. 26 teams competed in the preliminary rounds. Denmark defeated France 4–3 on aggregate in the final.

== Final ==
=== First leg ===
11 July 1998

| Denmark | 2–0 | France |
|---|---|---|
| Knudsen 6', 86' | Report |

Aabenraa Stadion, Aabenraa
Attendance: 389
Referee: Elke Günthner (Germany)

=== Second leg ===
18 July 1998

| France | 3–2 | Denmark |
|---|---|---|
| Devaud 11'; Le Denmat 75'; Pogeant 90+2' | Report | G Pedersen 43'; K Pedersen 73' |

Stade Paul Weber, Niederbronn-les-Bains
Attendance: 400
Referee: Nicole Mouidi-Pétignat (Switzerland)

Denmark won 4–3 on aggregate.
