= 2026 UEFA Women's Under-19 Championship qualification =

Tournament details
- Dates: Round 1: 21 October – 2 December 2025; Round 2: 27 February – 18 April 2026
- Teams: 52 (from 1 confederation)

Tournament statistics
- Matches played: 156
- Goals scored: 594 (3.81 per match)
- Top scorer(s): (Czech Republic) Adéla Trachtová (Israel) Goren Tamar (8 goals each)

The 2026 UEFA Women's Under-19 Championship qualification was an under-19 women's national football team competition that determined the seven teams joining the automatically qualified host team Bosnia and Herzegovina in the 2026 UEFA Women's Under-19 Championship final tournament.

San Marino made their debut in the UEFA women's competition at any level. Two national teams decided not to participate in the event, and Russia were excluded from the tournament due to the ongoing invasion of Ukraine. Therefore, including host Bosnia and Herzegovina, 52 teams entered this qualification competition. Round 1 of the qualification runs from 21 October to 2 December 2025, while Round 2 will be played in spring 2026. Players born on or after 1 January 2007 are eligible to participate.

== Format ==
The qualification consisted of two rounds, both with teams playing in two-tiered leagues. Each round league consisted of several groups, which are played as single-round-robin mini-tournaments, with one team from each group selected as the host after the draw.

- Round 1:
  - League A: 28 teams were drawn into seven groups of four. The top three teams from each group will advance to Round 2 League A; teams that finish fourth will be relegated to Round 2 League B.
  - League B: 24 teams were drawn into six groups of four. The group winners and the best runner-up team will be promoted to Round 2 League A; the other teams will be transferred to Round 2 League B.
- Round 2:
  - League A: 28 teams will be drawn into seven groups of four. The group winners will qualify for the final tournament. If Bosnia and Herzegovina, as the host of the final tournament, wins one of these groups, the best runner-up team will also qualify. Teams that will finish fourth will be relegated to Round 1 League B for the next season.
  - League B: 24 teams will be drawn into six groups of four. The group winners and the best runner-up team will be promoted to Round 1 League A for the next season.

=== Tiebreakers ===
In a group, teams are ranked according to points (3 points for a win, 1 point for a draw, 0 points for a loss), and if tied on points, the following tiebreaking criteria are applied, in the order given, to determine the rankings (Regulations Articles 17.01 and 17.02):

1. Points in head-to-head matches among tied teams;
2. Goal difference in head-to-head matches among tied teams;
3. Goals scored in head-to-head matches among tied teams;
4. If more than two teams were tied, and after applying all head-to-head criteria above, a subset of teams were still tied, all head-to-head criteria above were reapplied exclusively to this subset of teams;
5. Goal difference in all group matches;
6. Goals scored in all group matches;
7. Penalty shoot-out if only two teams have the same number of points, and they met in the last round of the group and were tied after applying all criteria above (not used if more than two teams have the same number of points, or if their rankings were not relevant for qualification for the next stage);
8. Disciplinary points (red card = 3 points, yellow card = 1 point, expulsion for two yellow cards in one match = 3 points);
9. Position in the applicable ranking:
  1. for teams in Round 1, position in the 2024–25 Round 2 league rankings;
  2. for teams in Round 2, position in the Round 1 league rankings.

To determine the best runner-up team in League B, the following criteria are applied (Regulations Article 18.03):

1. Points;
2. Goal difference;
3. Goals scored;
4. Disciplinary points;
5. Position in the applicable ranking:
  1. for teams in Round 1, position in the 2024–25 Round 2 league rankings;
  2. for teams in Round 2, position in the Round 1 league rankings.

== Round 1 ==
=== Draw ===
The draw for the Round 1 was held on 5 June 2025, at the UEFA headquarters in Nyon, Switzerland.

The 52 participating teams were split into two Leagues (28 in League A, 24 in League B) according to their final group standings of Round 2 of the 2024–25 competition (Regulations Article 13.01). To determine this ranking, the following criteria were followed:

1. higher position in the following classification:
  1. Round 2 League A group winners
  2. Round 2 League A group runners-up
  3. Round 2 League A third-placed teams
  4. Teams promoted from Round 2 League B
  5. Teams relegated from Round 2 League A
  6. Round 2 League B runners-up
  7. Round 2 League B third-placed teams
  8. Round 2 League B fourth-placed teams
2. higher number of points in all mini-tournament matches;
3. superior goal difference in all mini-tournament matches;
4. higher number of goals scored in all mini-tournament matches;
5. lower disciplinary points (red card = 3 points, yellow card = 1 point, expulsion for two yellow cards in one match = 3 points);
6. higher position in the 2024–25 Round 1 league rankings.

Within each League, the teams were allocated to four drawing pots (seven teams per pot in League A; six teams per pot in League B). Teams in the same pot would be drawn into different groups, with League A consisting of seven groups of four teams, and League B consisting of six groups of four teams.

Teams entering League A

The 21 teams of the previous season's Round 2 League A (top three teams in each group) and the seven teams of Round 2 League B (six group winners and the best runner-up) were drawn into seven groups of four teams. The Round 2 League A group winners were automatically seeded into Pot 1, the second- and third-placed teams into Pots 2 and 3, respectively. The previous season's Round 2 League B teams were seeded into Pot 4; their matches against the fourth-placed teams in their group did not count towards this ranking (Regulations Article 13.02).

Pos	Gr (Rk)	Team	Pld	W	D	L	GF	GA	GD	Pts	Seeding
1	A3 (1)	England	3	3	0	0	21	1	+20	9	Pot 1
2	A5 (1)	Spain	3	3	0	0	17	0	+17	9	Pot 1
3	A1 (1)	Netherlands	3	3	0	0	11	0	+11	9	Pot 1
4	A6 (1)	France	3	3	0	0	7	4	+3	9	Pot 1
5	A4 (1)	Italy	3	2	1	0	13	2	+11	7	Pot 1
6	A2 (1)	Portugal	3	2	1	0	8	2	+6	7	Pot 1
7	A7 (1)	Poland	3	2	0	1	8	2	+6	6	Pot 1
8	A4 (2)	Sweden	3	2	1	0	4	0	+4	7	Pot 2
9	A2 (2)	Norway	3	2	1	0	3	1	+2	7	Pot 2
10	A5 (2)	Switzerland	3	2	0	1	5	3	+2	6	Pot 2
11=	A1 (2)	Denmark	3	2	0	1	4	2	+2	6	Pot 2
11=	A7 (2)	Germany	3	2	0	1	4	2	+2	6	Pot 2
13	A3 (2)	Austria	3	2	0	1	7	6	+1	6	Pot 2
14	A6 (2)	Wales	3	1	1	1	2	2	0	4	Pot 2
15	A7 (3)	Finland	3	2	0	1	4	2	+2	6	Pot 3
16	A2 (3)	Iceland	3	1	0	2	4	4	0	3	Pot 3
17	A6 (3)	Republic of Ireland	3	1	0	2	2	3	−1	3	Pot 3
18	A1 (3)	Greece	3	1	0	2	4	7	−3	3	Pot 3
19	A5 (3)	Scotland	3	1	0	2	4	8	−4	3	Pot 3
20	A3 (3)	Belgium	3	1	0	2	5	10	−5	3	Pot 3
21	A4 (3)	Belarus	3	0	1	2	2	9	−7	1	Pot 3
22	B3 (1)	Kosovo	2	2	0	0	10	0	+10	6	Pot 4
23	B4 (1)	Northern Ireland	2	2	0	0	8	0	+8	6	Pot 4
24	B5 (1)	Croatia	2	2	0	0	6	0	+6	6	Pot 4
25	B1 (1)	Bulgaria	2	2	0	0	5	1	+4	6	Pot 4
26	B2 (1)	Faroe Islands	2	1	1	0	4	2	+2	4	Pot 4
27	B6 (1)	Turkey	2	1	1	0	1	0	+1	4	Pot 4
28	B2 (2)	Estonia	2	1	1	0	4	2	+2	4	Pot 4

Source: UEFA
Rules for classification: 1) round 1 position; 2) points; 3) goal difference; 4) goals scored; 5) disciplinary points; 6) position in the applicable rankings.

Teams entering League B

The seven fourth-placed teams of the previous season's Round 2 League A and the 17 non-promoted teams of Round 2 League B were drawn into six groups of four teams. The best six fourth-placed teams of Round 2 League A were automatically seeded into Pot 1. The seventh fourth-placed team of Round 2 League A and the runner-up teams of Round 2 League B were seeded into Pot 2. The third- and fourth-placed teams of the previous season's Round 2 League B were seeded into Pots 3 and 4, respectively. The matches of the second- and third-placed teams of Round 2 League B against the fourth-placed teams in their group did not count towards this ranking (Regulations Article 13.02).

Pos	Gr (Rk)	Team	Pld	W	D	L	GF	GA	GD	Pts	Seeding
1	A6 (4)	Serbia	3	0	1	2	4	6	−2	1	Pot 1
2	A4 (4)	Slovakia	3	0	1	2	2	10	−8	1	Pot 1
3	A2 (4)	Slovenia	3	0	0	3	2	10	−8	0	Pot 1
4	A7 (4)	Israel	3	0	0	3	1	11	−10	0	Pot 1
5	A1 (4)	Romania	3	0	0	3	0	10	−10	0	Pot 1
6	A5 (4)	Czech Republic	3	0	0	3	0	15	−15	0	Pot 1
7	A3 (4)	Ukraine	3	0	0	3	1	17	−16	0	Pot 2
8	B6 (2)	Hungary	2	1	0	1	2	2	0	3	Pot 2
9	B5 (2)	North Macedonia	2	1	0	1	1	2	−1	3	Pot 2
10	B4 (2)	Montenegro	2	1	0	1	2	4	−2	3	Pot 2
11	B1 (2)	Luxembourg	2	0	1	1	1	4	−3	1	Pot 2
12	B3 (2)	Latvia	2	0	1	1	1	5	−4	1	Pot 2
13	B1 (3)	Georgia	2	0	1	1	2	3	−1	1	Pot 3
14	B6 (3)	Bosnia and Herzegovina	2	0	1	1	1	2	−1	1	Pot 3
15	B3 (3)	Malta	2	0	1	1	1	7	−6	1	Pot 3
16	B2 (3)	Cyprus	2	0	0	2	0	4	−4	0	Pot 3
17	B5 (3)	Lithuania	2	0	0	2	0	5	−5	0	Pot 3
18	B4 (3)	Albania	2	0	0	2	1	7	−6	0	Pot 3
19	B3 (4)	Kazakhstan	3	0	1	2	2	5	−3	1	Pot 4
20	B5 (4)	Armenia	3	0	1	2	2	11	−9	1	Pot 4
21	B4 (4)	Azerbaijan	3	0	0	3	1	10	−9	0	Pot 4
22	B2 (4)	Moldova	3	0	0	3	1	15	−14	0	Pot 4
23	B1 (4)	Liechtenstein	3	0	0	3	0	19	−19	0	Pot 4
24	New entry	San Marino	—	—	—	—	—	—	—	0	Pot 4

Source: UEFA
Rules for classification: 1) round 1 position; 2) points; 3) goal difference; 4) goals scored; 5) disciplinary points; 6) position in the applicable rankings.

Did not enter

- Andorra
- Gibraltar

Banned

- Russia

=== League A ===
Times are CET/CEST, (Note: CEST (UTC+2) for dates up to 25 October 2025, and CET (UTC+1) for dates thereafter.) as listed by UEFA (local times, if different, are in parentheses).

==== Group A1 ====
Pos	Team	Pld	W	D	L	GF	GA	GD	Pts	Transfer or relegation
1	Denmark	3	2	1	0	8	3	+5	7	Transfer to Round 2 League A
2	Portugal (H)	3	2	1	0	7	3	+4	7	Transfer to Round 2 League A
3	Iceland	3	1	0	2	6	5	+1	3	Transfer to Round 2 League A
4	Kosovo	3	0	0	3	1	11	−10	0	Relegation to Round 2 League B

Source: UEFA
Rules for classification: Tiebreakers
(H) Hosts
26 November 2025
16:00 (15:00 UTC+0)

Iceland	1–2	Denmark
Van Bemme 43'	Report	Strauss 16'; Mott 18'

Albufeira Municipal Stadium, Albufeira
Referee: Martina Molinaro (Italy)
26 November 2025
19:00 (18:00 UTC+0)

Portugal	2–1	Kosovo
Martins 59'; Bessa 67'	Report	Aurela 54'

Estádio Algarve, Faro-Loulé
Referee: Sapir Gaya Berman (Israel)

29 November 2025
15:30 (14:30 UTC+0)

Denmark	4–0	Kosovo
Højer 35', 43'; Januzi 75' (o.g.); Strauss 90'	Report

Estádio Municipal de Portimão, Portimão
Referee: Martina Molinaro (Italy)
29 November 2025
18:30 (17:30 UTC+0)

Portugal	3–0	Iceland
Tristão 44'; Fernandes 69', 90+3'	Report

Estádio Municipal da Bela Vista, Parchal
Referee: Maïka Vanderstichel (France)

2 December 2025
16:00 (15:00 UTC+0)

Denmark	2–2	Portugal
Nielsen 11'; Luplau 43'	Report	Fernandes 63'; Melo 71'

Estádio Algarve, Faro-Loulé
Referee: Maïka Vanderstichel (France)
2 December 2025
16:00 (15:00 UTC+0)

Kosovo	0–5	Iceland
	Report	Hlynsdóttir 24', 45'; Jónsdóttir 63'; Stefánsdóttir 66'; Andradóttir 90+2'

Estádio Municipal da Bela Vista, Parchal
Referee: Sapir Gaya Berman (Israel)

==== Group A2 ====
Pos	Team	Pld	W	D	L	GF	GA	GD	Pts	Transfer or relegation
1	Spain	3	3	0	0	18	1	+17	9	Transfer to Round 2 League A
2	Germany (H)	3	1	1	1	10	7	+3	4	Transfer to Round 2 League A
3	Belgium	3	1	1	1	8	7	+1	4	Transfer to Round 2 League A
4	Faroe Islands	3	0	0	3	0	21	−21	0	Relegation to Round 2 League B

Source: UEFA
Rules for classification: Tiebreakers
(H) Hosts
26 November 2025
11:00

Spain	8–0	Faroe Islands
Cerrato 15', 19'; Segura 21', 40'; Quer 33'; Domínguez 38'; Moreno 49'; Comendador 74'	Report

Leichtathletikstadion, Duisburg
Referee: Tjaša Misja (Slovenia)
26 November 2025
14:30

Belgium	2–2	Germany
Spelkens 42'; Hermans 90+6'	Report	L. Wrede 74'; Gmeineder 85'

Sportschule Wedau, Duisburg
Referee: Deborah Bianchi (Italy)

29 November 2025
11:00

Spain	5–1	Belgium
Dorado 38'; Santiago 60'; Gómez 67'; Segura 75'; Comendador 90+4'	Report	Neyrinck 20'

Leichtathletikstadion, Duisburg
Referee: Milica Milovanović (Serbia)
29 November 2025
11:00

Germany	8–0	Faroe Islands
Schick 6'; Penner 9', 83'; Potsi 21'; Rückert 29'; Wrigge 47'; Sträßer 68' (pen.), 76'	Report

Sportschule Wedau, Duisburg
Referee: Deborah Bianchi (Italy)

2 December 2025
14:30

Germany	0–5	Spain
	Report	Segura 45+1', 70'; Jiménez 45+4', 90+6'; Cerrato 57'

Sportschule Wedau, Duisburg
Referee: Milica Milovanović (Serbia)
2 December 2025
14:30

Faroe Islands	0–5	Belgium
	Report	Baert 4'; Verhoeven 24'; Bonny 53'; De Ceuster 72'; Heyman 86'

Leichtathletikstadion, Duisburg
Referee: Tjaša Misja (Slovenia)

==== Group A3 ====
Pos	Team	Pld	W	D	L	GF	GA	GD	Pts	Transfer or relegation
1	England	3	2	1	0	11	1	+10	7	Transferred to Round 2 League A
2	Greece	3	2	0	1	5	4	+1	6	Transferred to Round 2 League A
3	Austria	3	1	1	1	13	3	+10	4	Transferred to Round 2 League A
4	Estonia (H)	3	0	0	3	0	21	−21	0	Relegated to Round 2 League B

Source: UEFA
Rules for classification: Tiebreakers
(H) Hosts
22 October 2025
10:30 (11:30 UTC+3)

Greece	2–0	Austria
Argyriou 20'; Tzourtzevits 62'	Report

Sportland Arena, Tallinn
Referee: Henrikke Nervik (Norway)
22 October 2025
16:00 (17:00 UTC+3)

England	6–0	Estonia
Parkinson 8', 29'; Jones 37'; Cruft 54'; Thompson 63' (pen.), 78'	Report

Sportland Arena, Tallinn
Referee: Ainara Acevedo (Spain)

25 October 2025
12:00 (13:00 UTC+3)

England	4–0	Greece
Hibbert-Johnson 18'; Platania 22' (o.g.); Parkinson 24'; Warren 85'	Report

Sportland Arena, Tallinn
Referee: Alexandra Collin (France)
25 October 2025
18:30 (19:30 UTC+3)

Austria	12–0	Estonia
Illinger 3', 42'; Spinn 15', 61'; Richter 23', 46'; Schäfer 38'; Lueger 45+2'; Grabovac 55'; Tuppinger 60'; Hofschweiger 66'; Herbst 78'	Report

Sportland Arena, Tallinn
Referee: Henrikke Nervik (Norway)

28 October 2025
12:00 (13:00 UTC+3)

Austria	1–1	England
Lueger 37'	Report	Shooter 36'

Sportland Arena, Tallinn
Referee: Alexandra Collin (France)
28 October 2025
18:30 (19:30 UTC+3)

Estonia	0–3	Greece
	Report	Kolempa 24'; Argyriou 35' (pen.), 53'

Sportland Arena, Tallinn
Referee: Ainara Acevedo (Spain)

==== Group A4 ====
Pos	Team	Pld	W	D	L	GF	GA	GD	Pts	Transfer or relegation
1	Norway	3	2	1	0	7	2	+5	7	Transfer to Round 2 League A
2	Scotland (H)	3	2	1	0	7	3	+4	7	Transfer to Round 2 League A
3	Netherlands	3	1	0	2	4	4	0	3	Transfer to Round 2 League A
4	Croatia	3	0	0	3	1	10	−9	0	Relegation to Round 2 League B

Source: UEFA
Rules for classification: Tiebreakers
(H) Hosts
26 November 2025
12:00 (11:00 UTC+0)

Netherlands	2–0	Croatia
Ivens 64'; Oudenampsen 90+3' (pen.)	Report

Broadwood Stadium, Cumbernauld
Referee: Karoline Wacker (Germany)
26 November 2025
16:30 (15:30 UTC+0)

Scotland	1–1	Norway
Berry 50'	Report	Galteland 13'

Broadwood Stadium, Cumbernauld
Referee: Ana Maria Terteleac (Romania)

29 November 2025
12:00 (11:00 UTC+0)

Norway	4–0	Croatia
Sødahl 7'; Andersson 14'; Malmin 79'; Enger 85' (pen.)	Report

Kirkintilloch Community Sports Complex, Glasgow
Referee: Ana Maria Terteleac (Romania)
29 November 2025
16:30 (15:30 UTC+0)

Netherlands	1–2	Scotland
Algra 36'	Report	Berry 81' (pen.); Neter 83' (o.g.)

Kirkintilloch Community Sports Complex, Glasgow
Referee: Miriama Bočková (Slovakia)

2 December 2025
16:00 (15:00 UTC+0)

Norway	2–1	Netherlands
Wassink 38' (o.g.); Enger 73'	Report	Guddal 68' (o.g.)

Broadwood Stadium, Cumbernauld
Referee: Miriama Bočková (Slovakia)
2 December 2025
16:00 (15:00 UTC+0)

Croatia	1–4	Scotland
Babić 13'	Report	Berry 61', 68'; Young 72'; Chomczuk 80'

Kirkintilloch Community Sports Complex, Glasgow
Referee: Karoline Wacker (Germany)

==== Group A5 ====
Pos	Team	Pld	W	D	L	GF	GA	GD	Pts	Transfer or relegation
1	Poland	3	3	0	0	8	0	+8	9	Transfer to Round 2 League A
2	Sweden	3	2	0	1	5	3	+2	6	Transfer to Round 2 League A
3	Republic of Ireland	3	1	0	2	5	7	−2	3	Transfer to Round 2 League A
4	Bulgaria (H)	3	0	0	3	1	9	−8	0	Relegation to Round 2 League B

Source: UEFA
Rules for classification: Tiebreakers
(H) Hosts
26 November 2025
10:00 (11:00 UTC+2)

Poland	3–0	Bulgaria
Piekarska 13'; Langosz 62'; Nsangou 67'	Report

Albena 1, Albena
Referee: Anastasia Mylopoulou (Greece)
26 November 2025
13:15 (14:15 UTC+2)

Republic of Ireland	1–3	Sweden
Lawlee 73'	Report	Lundin 4', 64'; Ekberg 85'

Albena 1, Albena
Referee: Olivia Tschon (Austria)

29 November 2025
10:00 (11:00 UTC+2)

Sweden	2–0	Bulgaria
Sjöström 10'; Mihaleva 90+4' (o.g.)	Report

Albena 1, Albena
Referee: Olivia Tschon (Austria)
29 November 2025
13:15 (14:15 UTC+2)

Poland	3–0	Republic of Ireland
Araśniewicz 10'; Langosz 37'; Witek 43'	Report

Albena 1, Albena
Referee: Lotta Vuorio (Finland)

2 December 2025
12:00 (13:00 UTC+2)

Sweden	0–2	Poland
	Report	Witek 36' (pen.), 61'

Stadion Spartak, Varna
Referee: Lotta Vuorio (Finland)
2 December 2025
12:00 (13:00 UTC+2)

Bulgaria	1–4	Republic of Ireland
Boneva 45+2'	Report	Butler 16', 41'; Wollmer 25'; Healy 34'

Albena 1, Albena
Referee: Anastasia Mylopoulou (Greece)

==== Group A6 ====
Pos	Team	Pld	W	D	L	GF	GA	GD	Pts	Transfer or relegation
1	Italy (H)	3	2	1	0	12	1	+11	7	Transfer to Round 2 League A
2	Switzerland	3	2	1	0	3	1	+2	7	Transfer to Round 2 League A
3	Northern Ireland	3	1	0	2	5	14	−9	3	Transfer to Round 2 League A
4	Belarus	3	0	0	3	2	6	−4	0	Relegation to Round 2 League B

Source: UEFA
Rules for classification: Tiebreakers
(H) Hosts
26 November 2025
11:30

Belarus	0–1	Switzerland
	Report	Keller 32'

Davide Astori - Viola Park, Florence
Referee: Kristina Georgieva (Bulgaria)
26 November 2025
15:00

Italy	10–1	Northern Ireland
Ventriglia 3', 53', 81'; Galli 8', 56'; Ferraresi 45+3'; Venturelli 48', 83'; Taddei 73', 90+3'	Report	Consolini 61' (o.g.)

Stadio Ettore Mannucci, Pontedera

29 November 2025
11:30

Switzerland	2–1	Northern Ireland
Vonnez 56'; Hinder 90+5'	Report	McGuinness 84'

Stadio Ettore Mannucci, Pontedera
29 November 2025
15:00

Italy	2–0	Belarus
Galli 31', 69'	Report

Davide Astori - Viola Park, Florence

2 December 2025
15:00

Switzerland	0–0	Italy
	Report

Stadio Ettore Mannucci, Pontedera
2 December 2025
15:00

Northern Ireland	3–2	Belarus
Hadzinskaya 26' (o.g.); McNeill 48'; Conway 90+8'	Report	Hampton 59' (o.g.); Marchuk 83'

Davide Astori - Viola Park, Florence

==== Group A7 ====
Pos	Team	Pld	W	D	L	GF	GA	GD	Pts	Transfer or relegation
1	France	3	3	0	0	7	3	+4	9	Transfer to Round 2 League A
2	Finland	3	1	1	1	4	3	+1	4	Transfer to Round 2 League A
3	Wales (H)	3	1	1	1	4	4	0	4	Transfer to Round 2 League A
4	Turkey	3	0	0	3	1	6	−5	0	Relegation to Round 2 League B

Source: UEFA
Rules for classification: Tiebreakers
(H) Hosts
26 November 2025
15:00 (14:00 UTC+0)

France	1–0	Turkey
Rouquet 8'	Report

Cardiff International Sports Campus, Cardiff
Referee: Lovisa Johansson (Sweden)
26 November 2025
19:00 (18:00 UTC+0)

Finland	0–0	Wales
	Report

Dragon Park, Newport
Referee: Jelena Medjedovic (Serbia)

29 November 2025
15:00 (14:00 UTC+0)

Wales	3–1	Turkey
Bowen 64'; Yarayan 67' (o.g.); Cole 86'	Report	Ersen 54'

Dragon Park, Newport
Referee: Jelena Medjedovic (Serbia)
29 November 2025
19:00 (18:00 UTC+0)

France	3–2	Finland
Mäkelä 28' (o.g.); Graziani 47'; Sierra 84'	Report	Kumpulainen 45+1'; Ulenius 72'

Cardiff International Sports Campus, Cardiff
Referee: Michaela Pachtova (Czechia)

2 December 2025
15:00 (14:00 UTC+0)

Wales	1–3	France
Em. Cole 75'	Report	Rafalski 26'; Rouquet 54'; Ebayilin 67'

Dragon Park, Newport
Referee: Michaela Pachtova (Czechia)
2 December 2025
15:00 (14:00 UTC+0)

Turkey	0–2	Finland
	Report	Kumpulainen 40'; Pirilä 86'

Cardiff International Sports Campus, Cardiff
Referee: Lovisa Johansson (Sweden)

=== League B ===
Times are CET/CEST, as listed by UEFA (local times, if different, are in parentheses).

==== Group B1 ====
Pos	Team	Pld	W	D	L	GF	GA	GD	Pts	Promotion or transfer
1	Serbia (H)	3	3	0	0	14	0	+14	9	Promotion to Round 2 League A
2	Montenegro	3	2	0	1	8	4	+4	6	Transfer to Round 2 League B
3	Cyprus	3	1	0	2	2	11	−9	3	Transfer to Round 2 League B
4	Armenia	3	0	0	3	0	9	−9	0	Transfer to Round 2 League B

Source: UEFA
Rules for classification: Tiebreakers
(H) Hosts
26 November 2025
11:00

Cyprus	1–3	Montenegro
Eleftheriou 79'	Report	Tomašević 15', 52' (pen.); Čižek 65'

Serbian FA Sports Center, Stara Pazova
Referee: Stacey Pearson (England)
26 November 2025
14:00

Serbia	3–0	Armenia
Cenanović 53'; Todorović 80'; Stanić 90+4'	Report

Serbian FA Sports Center, Stara Pazova
Referee: Marta San Juan (Andorra)

29 November 2025
11:00

Montenegro	5–0	Armenia
Tomašević 20', 29', 43'; Čižek 41'; Doknić 52'	Report

Serbian FA Sports Center, Stara Pazova
Referee: Stacey Pearson (England)
29 November 2025
14:00

Serbia	8–0	Cyprus
Ninković 3'; Topalov 17'; Zarubica 35'; Todorović 55'; Popović 59'; Cenanović 63'; Nikolić 68'; Popov 90+4'	Report

Serbian FA Sports Center, Stara Pazova
Referee: Sara Telek (Austria)

2 December 2025
12:00

Montenegro	0–3	Serbia
	Report	Nikolić 9'; Draganić 49'; Sinanović 66'

Serbian FA Sports Center, Stara Pazova
Referee: Sara Telek (Austria)
2 December 2025
12:00

Armenia	0–1	Cyprus
	Report	Mylona 45+2'

Serbian FA Sports Center, Stara Pazova
Referee: Marta San Juan (Andorra)

==== Group B2 ====
Pos	Team	Pld	W	D	L	GF	GA	GD	Pts	Promotion or transfer
1	Slovakia	3	3	0	0	20	0	+20	9	Promotion to Round 2 League A
2	Luxembourg	3	2	0	1	7	3	+4	6	Transfer to Round 2 League B
3	Albania (H)	3	1	0	2	5	9	−4	3	Transfer to Round 2 League B
4	Liechtenstein	3	0	0	3	0	20	−20	0	Transfer to Round 2 League B

Source: UEFA
Rules for classification: Tiebreakers
(H) Hosts
25 November 2025
12:00

Slovakia	11–0	Liechtenstein
Gondová 4', 43'; Kramlíková 8', 39'; Havalec 10', 49'; Bučková 20' (pen.); Pekárová 56'; Hrušovská 72'; Rumančíková 80'; Sluková 83'	Report

House of Football Natural Pitch, Tirana
Referee: Anastasiya Romanyuk (Ukraine)
25 November 2025
14:00

Albania	0–3	Luxembourg
	Report	Konsbruck 10'; Ribeiro 55', 90+6'

Arena Kombëtare, Tirana
Referee: Asen Albayrak (Türkiye)

28 November 2025
12:00

Luxembourg	4–0	Liechtenstein
Villegas 6', 62'; Jorge 43'; Ribeiro 52'	Report

House of Football Natural Pitch, Tirana
Referee: Asen Albayrak (Türkiye)
28 November 2025
14:00

Slovakia	6–0	Albania
Pekárová 20'; Kramlíková 45'; Havalec 59'; Gondová 61', 64'; Bekečová 90+1'	Report

Arena Kombëtare, Tirana
Referee: Melissa Burgin (England)

1 December 2025
13:30

Luxembourg	0–3	Slovakia
	Report	Bekečová 14'; Havalec 16', 20'

House of Football Natural Pitch, Tirana
Referee: Melissa Burgin (England)
1 December 2025
13:30

Liechtenstein	0–5	Albania
	Report	Nika 76'; Ago 84'; Qose 89'; Murataj 90+3'; Ndoj 90+5'

Arena Kombëtare, Tirana
Referee: Anastasiya Romanyuk (Ukraine)

==== Group B3 ====
Pos	Team	Pld	W	D	L	GF	GA	GD	Pts	Promotion or transfer
1	Romania	3	2	1	0	8	1	+7	7	Promotion to Round 2 League A
2	Ukraine	3	2	1	0	7	0	+7	7	Promotion to Round 2 League A
3	Bosnia and Herzegovina (H)	3	1	0	2	11	4	+7	3	Transfer to Round 2 League B
4	San Marino	3	0	0	3	0	21	−21	0	Transfer to Round 2 League B

Source: UEFA
Rules for classification: Tiebreakers
(H) Hosts
26 November 2025
13:00

Romania	6–0	San Marino
Szoke 24', 51'; Ouatu 44' (pen.), 53'; Olah 47', 61'	Report

Ugljevik City Stadium, Ugljevik
Referee: Katalin Sipos (Hungary)
26 November 2025
13:00

Bosnia and Herzegovina	0–2	Ukraine
	Report	Martseniuk 23'; Holovanchuk 76'

Bijeljina City Stadium, Bijeljina
Referee: Andromachi Tsiofliki (Greece)

29 November 2025
13:00

Romania	2–1	Bosnia and Herzegovina
Niculescu 34'; Olah 87'	Report	Jurić 85'

Ugljevik City Stadium, Ugljevik
Referee: Teresa Oliveira (Portugal)
29 November 2025
13:00

Ukraine	5–0	San Marino
Tkachuk 15', 89'; Holovanchuk 19'; Bielova 25'; Kanakhovska 38'	Report

Bijeljina City Stadium, Bijeljina
Referee: Andromachi Tsiofliki (Greece)

2 December 2025
13:00

Ukraine	0–0	Romania
	Report

Ugljevik City Stadium, Ugljevik
Referee: Teresa Oliveira (Portugal)
2 December 2025
13:00

San Marino	0–10	Bosnia and Herzegovina
	Report	Rankić 13', 71'; Mirković 22', 44'; Vukelić 52'; Jurić 57', 63'; Milićević 81'; Hadžihajdarević 87', 88'

Bijeljina City Stadium, Bijeljina
Referee: Katalin Sipos (Hungary)

==== Group B4 ====
Pos	Team	Pld	W	D	L	GF	GA	GD	Pts	Promotion or transfer
1	Hungary	3	3	0	0	15	1	+14	9	Promoted to Round 2 League A
2	Czech Republic (H)	3	2	0	1	16	3	+13	6	Transferred to Round 2 League B
3	Lithuania	3	1	0	2	7	10	−3	3	Transferred to Round 2 League B
4	Moldova	3	0	0	3	0	24	−24	0	Transferred to Round 2 League B

Source: UEFA
Rules for classification: Tiebreakers
(H) Hosts
21 October 2025
14:00

Lithuania	0–5	Hungary
	Report	Gégény 12', 68' (pen.); Vinals 28'; M. Szabó 37'; Turi 44'

FK Chmel Stadium, Blšany
Referee: Katarzyna Lisiecka-Sęk (Poland)
21 October 2025
17:00

Czech Republic	10–0	Moldova
Trachtová 2', 3'; Bartošová 13'; Balázsová 17', 21'; Tichá 33'; Boháčová 49'; Kroupová 71', 90', 90+5'	Report

Stadium FC Chomutov, Chomutov
Referee: Frederikke Lydia Søkjær (Denmark)

24 October 2025
14:00

Hungary	7–0	Moldova
Gégény 13', 36'; Turi 15'; Gágyor 17'; Pethe 53'; Vincze 63', 77'	Report

FK Chmel Stadium, Blšany
Referee: Katarzyna Lisiecka-Sęk (Poland)
24 October 2025
17:00

Czech Republic	5–0	Lithuania
Truksová 5'; Bartošová 14'; Rancová 35'; Gajdušková 59'; Šafářová 82'	Report

Stadium FC Chomutov, Chomutov
Referee: Michèle Schmölzer (Switzerland)

27 October 2025
14:00

Hungary	3–1	Czech Republic
Gégény 19'; Vincze 34'; Turi 90+1'	Report	Kroupová 83'

Stadium FC Chomutov, Chomutov
Referee: Michèle Schmölzer (Switzerland)
27 October 2025
14:00

Moldova	0–7	Lithuania
	Report	Tamošauskaitė 16'; Kairytė 28', 45+3'; Kiškūnaitė 45', 67'; Blaževičūtė 49'; Pocevičiūtė 76'

FK Chmel Stadium, Blšany
Referee: Frederikke Lydia Søkjær (Denmark)

==== Group B5 ====
Pos	Team	Pld	W	D	L	GF	GA	GD	Pts	Promotion or transfer
1	North Macedonia (H)	3	2	1	0	7	2	+5	7	Promotion to Round 2 League A
2	Slovenia	3	2	1	0	6	1	+5	7	Transfer to Round 2 League B
3	Georgia	3	1	0	2	4	6	−2	3	Transfer to Round 2 League B
4	Azerbaijan	3	0	0	3	1	9	−8	0	Transfer to Round 2 League B

Source: UEFA
Rules for classification: Tiebreakers
(H) Hosts
25 November 2025
12:00

Slovenia	2–0	Azerbaijan
Omerza 2'; Prelovšek 31'	Report

Stadion Kukuš, Strumica
Referee: Joanna Vassallo (Malta)
25 November 2025
12:00

Georgia	0–3	North Macedonia
	Report	Mitkovska 31'; Grozdanova 50'; Popeski 83'

Stadion Mladost, Strumica
Referee: Jurgita Mačikunytė (Lithuania)

29 November 2025
12:00

Slovenia	3–0	Georgia
Gerbec 12', 59'; Omerza 23'	Report

Stadion Kukuš, Strumica
Referee: Zuzana Valentová (Slovakia)
29 November 2025
12:00

North Macedonia	3–1	Azerbaijan
Popeski 19'; Galabovska 27' (pen.), 49'	Report	Jurugova 35'

Stadion Mladost, Strumica
Referee: Jurgita Mačikunytė (Lithuania)

1 December 2025
12:00

North Macedonia	1–1	Slovenia
Grozdanova 40'	Report	Gerbec 35'

Stadion Mladost, Strumica
Referee: Zuzana Valentová (Slovakia)
1 December 2025
12:00

Azerbaijan	0–4	Georgia
	Report	Tsikaridze 2', 9'; Buchukuri 45'; Gogoladze 90'

Stadion Kukuš, Strumica
Referee: Joanna Vassallo (Malta)

==== Group B6 ====
Pos	Team	Pld	W	D	L	GF	GA	GD	Pts	Promotion or transfer
1	Latvia	3	3	0	0	10	3	+7	9	Promotion to Round 2 League A
2	Israel	3	2	0	1	7	4	+3	6	Transfer to Round 2 League B
3	Malta (H)	3	1	0	2	5	9	−4	3	Transfer to Round 2 League B
4	Kazakhstan	3	0	0	3	1	7	−6	0	Transfer to Round 2 League B

Source: UEFA
Rules for classification: Tiebreakers
(H) Hosts
25 November 2025
11:00

Malta	1–5	Latvia
L. Farrugia 45+1'	Report	Belova 10'; Pinčuka 51'; Preijere 73' (pen.); Dzene 76'; Prymak 86'

Centenary Stadium, Ta' Qali
Referee: Araksya Saribekyan (Armenia)
25 November 2025
14:30

Israel	2–0	Kazakhstan
Tamar 9'; Israel 25'	Report

Centenary Stadium, Ta' Qali
Referee: Teona Sturua (Georgia)

28 November 2025
11:00

Latvia	2–0	Kazakhstan
Dzene 15'; Belova 74'	Report

Centenary Stadium, Ta' Qali
Referee: Araksya Saribekyan (Armenia)
28 November 2025
14:30

Israel	3–1	Malta
Israel 42'; Tamar 58'; Goulden 71'	Report	Francalanza 79'

Centenary Stadium, Ta' Qali
Referee: Marina Živković (Serbia)

1 December 2025
11:00

Latvia	3–2	Israel
Šteinberga 40'; Pinčuka 72'; Kallase 77'	Report	Tamar 65'; Shvill 88'

National Stadium, Ta' Qali
Referee: Marina Živković (Serbia)
1 December 2025
11:00

Kazakhstan	1–3	Malta
Aldanazar 68'	Report	Flannery 26'; L. Farrugia 46'; Celeste 51'

Centenary Stadium, Ta' Qali
Referee: Teona Sturua (Georgia)

==== Ranking of second-placed teams ====
Since all groups have the same number of teams, all three matches are taken into account (Regulations Article 18.01).

Pos	Grp	Team	Pld	W	D	L	GF	GA	GD	Pts	Promotion
1	B3	Ukraine	3	2	1	0	7	0	+7	7	Promotion to Round 2 League A
2	B5	Slovenia	3	2	1	0	6	1	+5	7	
3	B4	Czech Republic	3	2	0	1	16	3	+13	6	
4	B1	Montenegro	3	2	0	1	8	4	+4	6	
5	B2	Luxembourg	3	2	0	1	7	3	+4	6	
6	B6	Israel	3	2	0	1	7	4	+3	6	

Source: UEFA
Rules for classification: 1) points; 2) goal difference; 3) goals scored; 4) disciplinary points; 5) position in the applicable rankings.

== Round 2 ==
=== Draw ===
The draw for the Round 2 was held on 11 December 2025 at the UEFA headquarters in Nyon, Switzerland.

The 52 participating teams will be split into two Leagues (28 in League A, 24 in League B) according to their final group standings of Round 1 (Regulations Article 15.01).

Within each League, the teams will be allocated to four drawing pots (seven teams per pot in League A; six teams per pot in League B). Teams in the same pot would be drawn into different groups, with League A consisting of seven groups of four teams, and League B consisting of six groups of four teams.

Teams entering League A

The 21 teams of Round 1 League A (top three teams in each group) and the seven teams of Round 1 League B (six group winners and the best runner-up) will be drawn into seven groups of four teams. The Round 1 League A group winners are automatically seeded into Pot 1, the second- and third-placed teams into Pots 2 and 3, respectively. The Round 1 League B teams are seeded into Pot 4. (Regulations Article 15.01).

Pos	Gr (Rk)	Team	Pld	W	D	L	GF	GA	GD	Pts	Seeding
1	A2 (1)	Spain	3	3	0	0	18	1	+17	9	Pot 1
2	A5 (1)	Poland	3	3	0	0	8	0	+8	9	Pot 1
3	A7 (1)	France	3	3	0	0	7	3	+4	9	Pot 1
4	A6 (1)	Italy	3	2	1	0	12	1	+11	7	Pot 1
5	A3 (1)	England	3	2	1	0	11	1	+10	7	Pot 1
6	A1 (1)	Denmark	3	2	1	0	8	3	+5	7	Pot 1
7	A4 (1)	Norway	3	2	1	0	7	2	+5	7	Pot 1
8=	A4 (2)	Scotland	3	2	1	0	7	3	+4	7	Pot 2
8=	A1 (2)	Portugal	3	2	1	0	7	3	+4	7	Pot 2
10	A6 (2)	Switzerland	3	2	1	0	3	1	+2	7	Pot 2
11	A5 (2)	Sweden	3	2	0	1	5	3	+2	6	Pot 2
12	A3 (2)	Greece	3	2	0	1	5	4	+1	6	Pot 2
13	A2 (2)	Germany	3	1	1	1	10	7	+3	4	Pot 2
14	A7 (2)	Finland	3	1	1	1	4	3	+1	4	Pot 2
15	A3 (3)	Austria	3	1	1	1	13	3	+10	4	Pot 3
16	A2 (3)	Belgium	3	1	1	1	8	7	+1	4	Pot 3
17	A7 (3)	Wales	3	1	1	1	4	4	0	4	Pot 3
18	A1 (3)	Iceland	3	1	0	2	6	5	+1	3	Pot 3
19	A4 (3)	Netherlands	3	1	0	2	4	4	0	3	Pot 3
20	A5 (3)	Republic of Ireland	3	1	0	2	5	7	−2	3	Pot 3
21	A6 (3)	Northern Ireland	3	1	0	2	5	14	−9	3	Pot 3
22	B2 (1)	Slovakia	3	3	0	0	20	0	+20	9	Pot 4
23	B4 (1)	Hungary	3	3	0	0	15	1	+14	9	Pot 4
24	B1 (1)	Serbia	3	3	0	0	14	0	+14	9	Pot 4
25	B6 (1)	Latvia	3	3	0	0	10	3	+7	9	Pot 4
26	B3 (1)	Romania	3	2	1	0	8	1	+7	7	Pot 4
27	B5 (1)	North Macedonia	3	2	1	0	7	2	+5	7	Pot 4
28	B3 (2)	Ukraine	3	2	1	0	7	0	+7	7	Pot 4

Source: UEFA
Rules for classification: 1) round 1 position; 2) points; 3) goal difference; 4) goals scored; 5) disciplinary points; 6) position in the applicable rankings.

Teams entering League B

The seven fourth-placed teams of Round 1 League A and the 17 non-promoted teams of Round 1 League B will be drawn into six groups of four teams. The best six fourth-placed teams of Round 1 League A will be automatically seeded into Pot 1. The seventh fourth-placed team of Round 1 League A and the runner-up teams of Round 1 League B will be seeded into Pot 2. The third- and fourth-placed teams of Round 1 League B will be seeded into Pots 3 and 4, respectively (Regulations Article 15.01).

Pos	Gr (Rk)	Team	Pld	W	D	L	GF	GA	GD	Pts	Seeding
1	A6 (4)	Belarus	3	0	0	3	2	6	−4	0	Pot 1
2	A7 (4)	Turkey	3	0	0	3	1	6	−5	0	Pot 1
3	A5 (4)	Bulgaria	3	0	0	3	1	9	−8	0	Pot 1
4	A4 (4)	Croatia	3	0	0	3	1	10	−9	0	Pot 1
5	A1 (4)	Kosovo	3	0	0	3	1	11	−10	0	Pot 1
6	A3 (4)	Estonia	3	0	0	3	0	21	−21	0 (Note: Ranked on disciplinary points: Estonia -1, Faroe Islands -4.)	Pot 1
7	A2 (4)	Faroe Islands	3	0	0	3	0	21	−21	0	Pot 2
8	B5 (2)	Slovenia	3	2	1	0	6	1	+5	7	Pot 2
9	B4 (2)	Czech Republic	3	2	0	1	16	3	+13	6	Pot 2
10	B1 (2)	Montenegro	3	2	0	1	8	4	+4	6	Pot 2
11	B2 (2)	Luxembourg	3	2	0	1	7	3	+4	6	Pot 2
12	B6 (2)	Israel	3	2	0	1	7	4	+3	6	Pot 2
13	B3 (3)	Bosnia and Herzegovina	3	1	0	2	11	4	+7	3	Pot 3
14	B5 (3)	Georgia	3	1	0	2	4	6	−2	3	Pot 3
15	B4 (3)	Lithuania	3	1	0	2	7	10	−3	3	Pot 3
16=	B2 (3)	Albania	3	1	0	2	5	9	−4	3	Pot 3
16=	B6 (3)	Malta	3	1	0	2	5	9	−4	3	Pot 3
18	B1 (3)	Cyprus	3	1	0	2	2	11	−9	3	Pot 3
19	B6 (4)	Kazakhstan	3	0	0	3	1	7	−6	0	Pot 4
20	B5 (4)	Azerbaijan	3	0	0	3	1	9	−8	0	Pot 4
21	B1 (4)	Armenia	3	0	0	3	0	9	−9	0	Pot 4
22	B2 (4)	Liechtenstein	3	0	0	3	0	20	−20	0	Pot 4
23	B3 (4)	San Marino	3	0	0	3	0	21	−21	0	Pot 4
24	B4 (4)	Moldova	3	0	0	3	0	24	−24	0	Pot 4

Source: UEFA
Rules for classification: 1) round 1 position; 2) points; 3) goal difference; 4) goals scored; 5) disciplinary points; 6) position in the applicable rankings.

=== League A ===
Times are CET (UTC+1) as listed by UEFA (local times, if different, are in parentheses).

==== Group A1 ====
Pos	Team	Pld	W	D	L	GF	GA	GD	Pts	Qualification or relegation
1	Switzerland (H)	3	3	0	0	7	1	+6	9	Qualification for the final tournament
2	Wales	3	2	0	1	6	6	0	6	
3	England	3	1	0	2	7	5	+2	3	
4	Latvia	3	0	0	3	2	10	−8	0	Relegation to League B for the next season's qualification

Source: www.sofascore.com
Rules for classification: Tiebreakers
(H) Hosts
9 April 2026
13:00

Wales	0–3	Switzerland
	Report	Pfister 54', 69' (pen.); Thüer 60'

Tissot Arena, Biel
Referee: Milica Milovanović (Serbia)
9 April 2026
17:30

England	5–0	Latvia
Shaw 12'; Maltby 29' (pen.); Drury 59'; Hylton 76'; Jones 89'	Report

Tissot Arena, Biel
Referee: Filipa Pereira Cunha (Portugal)

12 April 2026
13:00

Switzerland	2–1	Latvia
Mece 62'; Pfister 67'	Report	Belova 72' (pen.)

Stade de Copet, Vevey
Referee: Milica Milovanović (Serbia)
12 April 2026
17:30

England	2–3	Wales
Rodgers 24' (o.g.); Hendle 48'	Report	Cole 26'; Hill 44', 77'

Stade de Copet, Vevey
Referee: Nanna Løf Andersen (Denmark)

15 April 2026
13:00

Switzerland	2–0	England
Pfister 33', 75'	Report

Tissot Arena, Biel
Referee: Filipa Pereira Cunha (Portugal)
15 April 2026
13:00

Latvia	1–3	Wales
Haritonova 48'	Report	Em. Cole 20'; Lewis 24'; Gregson 27'

Stade de Copet, Vevey
Referee: Nanna Løf Andersen (Denmark)

==== Group A2 ====
Pos	Team	Pld	W	D	L	GF	GA	GD	Pts	Qualification or relegation
1	Poland (H)	3	2	1	0	7	0	+7	7	Qualification for the final tournament
2	Greece	3	2	0	1	2	3	−1	6	
3	Belgium	3	1	1	1	1	1	0	4	
4	Romania	3	0	0	3	0	6	−6	0	Relegation to League B for the next season's qualification

Source: www.sofascore.com
Rules for classification: Tiebreakers
(H) Hosts
12 April 2026
11:00

Poland	4–0	Romania
Zwiazek 15'; Zgoda 49'; Zielińska 79'; Rogus 90'	Report

Stadion Miejski, Gniezno
Referee: Minka Vekkeli (Finland)
12 April 2026
14:00

Belgium	0–1	Greece
	Report	Nanou 78'

Miejski Września, Września
Referee: Karoline Marie Jensen (Norway)

15 April 2026
11:00

Poland	0–0	Belgium
	Report

Stadion Miejski, Gniezno
Referee: Sabina Bolic (Croatia)
15 April 2026
14:00

Greece	1–0	Romania
Argyriou 67'	Report

Sredzkie Centrum Sportu, Sroda Wielkopolska
Referee: Karoline Marie Jensen (Norway)

18 April 2026
11:00

Greece	0–3	Poland
	Report	Flis 25'; Zwiazek 62'; Świrska 90+5'

Miejski Września, Września
Referee: Sabina Bolic (Croatia)
18 April 2026
11:00

Romania	0–1	Belgium
	Report	Hens 90+3'

Sredzkie Centrum Sportu, Sroda Wielkopolska
Referee: Minka Vekkeli (Finland)

==== Group A3 ====
Pos	Team	Pld	W	D	L	GF	GA	GD	Pts	Qualification or relegation
1	Iceland	3	2	1	0	7	3	+4	7	Qualification for the final tournament
2	Denmark	3	2	0	1	5	4	+1	6	
3	Finland	3	1	1	1	3	3	0	4	
4	Serbia (H)	3	0	0	3	0	5	−5	0	Relegation to League B for the next season's qualification

Source: www.sofascore.com
Rules for classification: Tiebreakers
(H) Hosts
9 April 2026
11:00

Iceland	1–1	Finland
Kristjánsdóttir 66'	Report	Kumpulainen 61'

Serbian FA Sports Center, Stara Pazova
Referee: Michèle Schmölzer (Switzerland)
9 April 2026
14:00

Denmark	1–0	Serbia
Nielsen 67'	Report

Serbian FA Sports Center, Stara Pazova
Referee: Caroline Lanssens (Belgium)

12 April 2026
11:00

Denmark	2–3	Iceland
Højer 45+5' (pen.); Strauss 77'	Report	Mott 19' (o.g.); Linnet 48'; Kynde 57' (o.g.)

Serbian FA Sports Center, Stara Pazova
Referee: Abigail Byrne (England)
12 April 2026
14:00

Finland	1–0	Serbia
Heinonen 52'	Report

Serbian FA Sports Center, Stara Pazova
Referee: Michèle Schmölzer (Switzerland)

15 April 2026
12:00

Finland	1–2	Denmark
Mäkelä 25'	Report	Højer 55', 62'

Serbian FA Sports Center, Stara Pazova
Referee: Abigail Byrne (England)
15 April 2026
12:00

Serbia	0–3	Iceland
	Report	Hlynsdóttir 28', 50'; Stefánsdóttir 36'

Serbian FA Sports Center, Stara Pazova
Referee: Caroline Lanssens (Belgium)

==== Group A4 ====
Pos	Team	Pld	W	D	L	GF	GA	GD	Pts	Qualification or relegation
1	Austria	3	2	0	1	8	2	+6	6 (Note: Ranked on head-to-head goal difference: Austria +1, Scotland 0, Norway –1.)	Qualification for the final tournament
2	Scotland (H)	3	2	0	1	12	3	+9	6	
3	Norway	3	2	0	1	5	3	+2	6	
4	North Macedonia	3	0	0	3	0	17	−17	0	Relegation to League B for the next season's qualification

Source: www.sofascore.com
Rules for classification: Tiebreakers
(H) Hosts
Notes:
10 April 2026
12:30

Norway	3–0	North Macedonia
Steen 8'; Andreassen 48'; Malmin 58'	Report

Broadwood Stadium, Cumbernauld
Referee: Eugenia Gil Soriano (Spain)
10 April 2026
14:00

Austria	1–2	Scotland
Spinn 34'	Report	Berry 45+1' (pen.); Martin 89' (pen.)

Kirkintilloch Community Sports Complex, Glasgow
Referee: Karoline Wacker (Germany)

13 April 2026
12:30

Norway	0–2	Austria
	Report	Spinn 33' (pen.), 71' (pen.)

Broadwood Stadium, Cumbernauld
Referee: Deborah Anex (Switzerland)
13 April 2026
14:00

Scotland	9–0	North Macedonia
Black 20'; Tobin 29'; McGoldrick 38', 54'; West 41'; Berry 44' (pen.); Chomczuk 74'; I. Taylor 78'; J. Husband 90'	Report

Kirkintilloch Community Sports Complex, Glasgow
Referee: Karoline Wacker (Germany)

16 April 2026
14:00

Scotland	1–2	Norway
Chomczuk 79'	Report	Kerim-Lindland 5'; Malmin 29'

Kirkintilloch Community Sports Complex, Glasgow
Referee: Deborah Anex (Switzerland)
16 April 2026
14:00

North Macedonia	0–5	Austria
	Report	Spinn 35' (pen.); Osl 50'; Herbst 70', 90+2'; Lueger 79'

Broadwood Stadium, Cumbernauld
Referee: Eugenia Gil Soriano (Spain)

==== Group A5 ====
Pos	Team	Pld	W	D	L	GF	GA	GD	Pts	Qualification or relegation
1	Sweden (H)	3	2	1	0	3	1	+2	7	Qualification for the final tournament
2	Netherlands	3	2	0	1	8	3	+5	6	
3	Italy	3	1	1	1	3	5	−2	4	
4	Ukraine	3	0	0	3	0	5	−5	0	Relegation to League B for the next season's qualification

Source: www.sofascore.com
Rules for classification: Tiebreakers
(H) Hosts
11 April 2026
13:00

Italy	2–0	Ukraine
Venturelli 72'; Ferraresi 78'	Report

Borås Arena, Borås
Referee: Kristina Georgieva (Bulgaria)
11 April 2026
18:00

Netherlands	1–2	Sweden
Pennock 85'	Report	Priks 42'; Ekberg 75'

Borås Arena, Borås
Referee: Anastasia Mylopoulou (Greece)

14 April 2026
13:00

Italy	1–5	Netherlands
Galli 42'	Report	Ivens 10'; Pennock 14'; Van Dijk 21', 33'; Gelevert 76'

Borås Arena, Borås
Referee: Miriama Bočková (Slovakia)
14 April 2026
18:00

Sweden	1–0	Ukraine
Mattsson 30'	Report

Borås Arena, Borås
Referee: Anastasia Mylopoulou (Greece)

17 April 2026
18:00

Sweden	0–0	Italy
	Report

Borås Arena, Borås
Referee: Miriama Bočková (Slovakia)
17 April 2026
18:00

Ukraine	0–2	Netherlands
	Report	Van Dijk 11'; Touzani 63'

Hisingen area, Gothenburg
Referee: Kristina Georgieva (Bulgaria)

==== Group A6 ====
Pos	Team	Pld	W	D	L	GF	GA	GD	Pts	Qualification or relegation
1	Germany (H)	3	3	0	0	9	3	+6	9	Qualification for the final tournament
2	France	3	1	1	1	5	5	0	4	
3	Slovakia	3	1	0	2	5	7	−2	3	
4	Republic of Ireland	3	0	1	2	3	7	−4	1	Relegation to League B for the next season's qualification

Source: www.sofascore.com
Rules for classification: Tiebreakers
(H) Hosts
10 April 2026
12:00

France	2–1	Slovakia
Rouquet 16'; Gay 61' (pen.)	Report	Havalec 74'

IMS Arena, Velbert
Referee: Merima Čelik (Bosnia and Herzegovina)
10 April 2026
15:30

Republic of Ireland	0–3	Germany
	Report	L. Wrede 22'; Bäcker 62'; J. Wrede 71'

Uhlenkrugstadion, Essen
Referee: Deborah Bianchi (Italy)

13 April 2026
12:00

France	2–2	Republic of Ireland
Gay 34'; Morissaint 75'	Report	Newell 54'; Cowper-Grey 62'

Uhlenkrugstadion, Essen
Referee: Michaela Pachtová (Czechia)
13 April 2026
17:00

Germany	4–2	Slovakia
Portella 1'; Schick 27'; Eggert 45+3'; Rückert 85'	Report	Rumančíková 14'; Havalec 59'

IMS Arena, Velbert
Referee: Deborah Bianchi (Italy)

16 April 2026
17:00

Germany	2–1	France
Rückert 3'; Börner 79'	Report	Morissaint 66'

Uhlenkrugstadion, Essen
Referee: Michaela Pachtová (Czechia)
16 April 2026
17:00

Slovakia	2–1	Republic of Ireland
Šoltysová 61', 84'	Report	Donegan 42'

IMS Arena, Velbert
Referee: Merima Čelik (Bosnia and Herzegovina)

==== Group A7 ====
Pos	Team	Pld	W	D	L	GF	GA	GD	Pts	Qualification or relegation
1	Spain	3	2	1	0	6	0	+6	7	Qualification for the final tournament
2	Portugal (H)	3	2	1	0	4	0	+4	7	
3	Northern Ireland	3	0	1	2	1	5	−4	1	
4	Hungary	3	0	1	2	1	7	−6	1	Relegation to League B for the next season's qualification

Source: www.sofascore.com
Rules for classification: Tiebreakers
(H) Hosts
12 April 2026
12:00

Spain	3–0	Hungary
Domínguez 30'; Gómez 86'; Santiago 90+4'	Report

Estádio Nacional, Oeiras
Referee: Alexandra Collin (France)
12 April 2026
18:00

Northern Ireland	0–1	Portugal
	Report	Valente 37' (pen.)

Cidade do Futebol, Oeiras
Referee: Olivia Tschon (Austria)

15 April 2026
12:00

Spain	3–0	Northern Ireland
Gómez 27'; Dorado 32'; Boyd 39' (o.g.)	Report

Estádio Nacional, Oeiras
Referee: Ana Maria Terteleac (Romania)
15 April 2026
18:00

Portugal	3–0	Hungary
Fernandes 43'; Bessa 69', 89'	Report

Cidade do Futebol, Oeiras
Referee: Olivia Tschon (Austria)

18 April 2026
18:00

Portugal	0–0	Spain
	Report

Cidade do Futebol, Oeiras
Referee: Ana Maria Terteleac (Romania)
18 April 2026
18:00

Hungary	1–1	Northern Ireland
Hanász 53'	Report	Breen 67'

Estádio Nacional, Oeiras
Referee: Alexandra Collin (France)

=== League B ===
Times are CET (UTC+1) as listed by UEFA (local times, if different, are in parentheses).

==== Group B1 ====
Pos	Team	Pld	W	D	L	GF	GA	GD	Pts	Promotion
1	Slovenia	3	3	0	0	14	1	+13	9	Promotion to League A for the next season's qualification
2	Estonia	3	2	0	1	2	5	−3	6	
3	Cyprus	3	1	0	2	3	5	−2	3	
4	San Marino (H)	3	0	0	3	3	11	−8	0	

Source: www.sofascore.com
Rules for classification: Tiebreakers
(H) Hosts
27 February 2026
11:00

Estonia	1–0	San Marino
Kelli 79'	Report

Acquaviva Stadium, Acquaviva
Referee: Kristina Kozoroh (Ukraine)
27 February 2026
11:00

Cyprus	0–2	Slovenia
	Report	Osolnik 30'; Vlachou 32' (o.g.)

Stadio Ezio Conti di Dogana, Dogana
Referee: Vesna Miletić (Bosnia and Herzegovina)

2 March 2026
11:00

Estonia	1–0	Cyprus
Jotkina 22'	Report

Stadio Ezio Conti di Dogana, Dogana
Referee: Kristina Kozoroh (Ukraine)
2 March 2026
11:00

Slovenia	7–1	San Marino
Omerza 1', 8', 50'; Osolnik 3'; Trost 12', 45'; Gerbec 22'	Report	Benedettini 79'

Acquaviva Stadium, Acquaviva
Referee: Vesna Miletić (Bosnia and Herzegovina)

5 March 2026
11:00

Slovenia	5–0	Estonia
Omerza 6'; Prelovšek 36'; Šrot 68'; Trost 72', 78'	Report

Stadio Ezio Conti di Dogana, Dogana
Referee: Vesna Miletić (Bosnia and Herzegovina)
5 March 2026
11:00

San Marino	2–3	Cyprus
Paone 60'; Benedettini 82' (pen.)	Report	Mesolongitou 2', 50'; Matsoukari 38'

Acquaviva Stadium, Acquaviva
Referee: Kristina Kozoroh (Ukraine)

==== Group B2 ====
Pos	Team	Pld	W	D	L	GF	GA	GD	Pts	Promotion
1	Kosovo	3	2	0	1	11	3	+8	6 (Note: Ranked on head-to-head points: Kosovo 3, Faroe Islands 0.)	Promotion to League A for the next season's qualification
2	Faroe Islands	3	2	0	1	10	6	+4	6	
3	Lithuania	3	1	1	1	3	4	−1	4	
4	Moldova	3	0	1	2	1	12	−11	1	

Source: www.sofascore.com
Rules for classification: Tiebreakers
Notes:
12 April 2026
11:00

Kosovo	6–0	Moldova
Januzi 14'; Meha 32', 60'; Emelina 78' (o.g.); Lecaj 86'; Sinani 88'	Report

Raudondvaris Stadium, Raudondvaris
Referee: Farida Lutfaliyeva (Azerbaijan)
12 April 2026
16:30

Lithuania	1–3	Faroe Islands
Kairytė 39'	Report	Benjaminsen 11', 81'; Sigurðsson 44'

Raudondvaris Stadium, Raudondvaris
Referee: Briet Bragadottir (Iceland)

15 April 2026
11:00

Faroe Islands	5–0	Moldova
Benjaminsen 16' (pen.), 76', 90+3'; Sigurðsson 50'; Mohr 56'	Report

Raudondvaris Stadium, Raudondvaris
Referee: Briet Bragadottir (Iceland)
15 April 2026
17:00

Kosovo	0–1	Lithuania
	Report	Jokubaitytė 77'

Raudondvaris Stadium, Raudondvaris
Referee: Eirini Pingiou (Greece)

18 April 2026
11:00

Faroe Islands	2–5	Kosovo
Sigurðsson 13'; Benjaminsen 39'	Report	Meha 16', 26', 78', 90+2'; Kallaba 29'

Raudondvaris Stadium, Raudondvaris
Referee: Eirini Pingiou (Greece)
18 April 2026
16:30

Moldova	1–1	Lithuania
Kleyner 30'	Report	Kiškūnaitė 50' (pen.)

Raudondvaris Stadium, Raudondvaris
Referee: Farida Lutfaliyeva (Azerbaijan)

==== Group B3 ====
Pos	Team	Pld	W	D	L	GF	GA	GD	Pts	Promotion
1	Israel	3	3	0	0	15	2	+13	9	Promotion to League A for the next season's qualification
2	Bulgaria	3	2	0	1	13	6	+7	6	
3	Malta (H)	3	1	0	2	1	13	−12	3	
4	Kazakhstan	3	0	0	3	1	9	−8	0	

Source: www.sofascore.com
Rules for classification: Tiebreakers
(H) Hosts
9 April 2026
11:00

Bulgaria	5–1	Kazakhstan
Petrova 9', 53'; Boneva 22'; Baliova 45+3'; Boyadzhieva 58'	Report	Medvedeva 32'

Centenary Stadium, Ta' Qali
Referee: Jelena Kumer (Croatia)
9 April 2026
14:30

Malta	0–7	Israel
	Report	Tamar 3', 38'; Goulden 22'; Divan 42' (pen.), 48'; Camin 82'; Elmaleh 87'

Centenary Stadium, Ta' Qali
Referee: Manon Plandsoen (The Netherlands)

12 April 2026
11:00

Israel	3–0	Kazakhstan
Tamar 10'; Arkobi 15'; Hazan 26'	Report

Centenary Stadium, Ta' Qali
Referee: Manon Plandsoen (The Netherlands)
12 April 2026
14:30

Bulgaria	6–0	Malta
Petrova 11', 77'; Ravnachka 39', 53' (pen.); Baliova 70'; Halyanova 87'	Report

Centenary Stadium, Ta' Qali
Referee: Gamze Durmuş (Türkiye)

15 April 2026
11:00

Israel	5–2	Bulgaria
Tamar 21', 70'; Goulden 80', 85'; T. Mor 87' (pen.)	Report	Ravnachka 24' (pen.); Petrova 90+4'

National Stadium, Ta' Qali
Referee: Gamze Durmuş (Türkiye)
15 April 2026
11:00

Kazakhstan	0–1	Malta
	Report	E. Micallef 62'

Centenary Stadium, Ta' Qali
Referee: Jelena Kumer (Croatia)

==== Group B4 ====
Pos	Team	Pld	W	D	L	GF	GA	GD	Pts	Promotion
1	Bosnia and Herzegovina	3	2	1	0	9	2	+7	7	Promotion to League A for the next season's qualification
2	Belarus	3	2	1	0	5	1	+4	7	Promotion to League A for the next season's qualification
3	Luxembourg (H)	3	1	0	2	5	7	−2	3	
4	Armenia	3	0	0	3	1	10	−9	0	

Source: www.sofascore.com
Rules for classification: Tiebreakers
(H) Hosts
27 February 2026
15:00

Belarus	2–0	Armenia
Marchuk 27'; Yurchuk 29'	Report

Op Biirk, Mensdorf
Referee: Sara Telek (Austria)
27 February 2026
19:00

Bosnia and Herzegovina	5–0	Luxembourg
Jurić 3', 65'; Hafizović 33'; Abdukić 42'; Marković 72'	Report

Stade Albert Berchem, Kehlen
Referee: Eglantina Pjetrushaj (Albania)

2 March 2026
15:00

Belarus	1–1	Bosnia and Herzegovina
Katsynel 88'	Report	Jurić 6'

Stade Albert Berchem, Kehlen
Referee: Elena Gobjila (Moldova)
2 March 2026
19:00

Luxembourg	5–0	Armenia
Berenguer 5'; Alves 48'; Soares 51'; Morvilli 63'; Ribeiro 68'	Report

Op Flohr Stadion, Grevenmacher
Referee: Eglantina Pjetrushaj (Albania)

5 March 2026
19:00

Luxembourg	0–2	Belarus
	Report	Kaliuta 7'; Vasiliuk 33'

Op Biirk, Mensdorf
Referee: Elena Gobjila (Moldova)
5 March 2026
19:00

Armenia	1–3	Bosnia and Herzegovina
Injyan 29'	Report	Mirković 45'; Krpo 45+2'; Brković 80'

Op Flohr Stadion, Grevenmacher
Referee: Sara Telek (Austria)

==== Group B5 ====
Pos	Team	Pld	W	D	L	GF	GA	GD	Pts	Promotion
1	Turkey	3	3	0	0	12	0	+12	9	Promotion to League A for the next season's qualification
2	Albania (H)	3	1	1	1	5	3	+2	4	
3	Montenegro	3	1	1	1	7	7	0	4	
4	Liechtenstein	3	0	0	3	0	14	−14	0	

Source: www.sofascore.com
Rules for classification: Tiebreakers
(H) Hosts
9 April 2026
12:00

Turkey	6–0	Liechtenstein
Öztürk 2'; Ersen 5'; Ayhan 42'; Şengül 53'; Beyazgul 74'; Bilir 82' (pen.)	Report

Egnatia Arena, Rrogozhinë
Referee: Tjaša Misja (Slovenia)
9 April 2026
15:00

Albania	2–2	Montenegro
Kadiolli 72'; Bushati 90'	Report	Dresaj 28'; Merdović 90+4'

House of Football Natural Pitch, Tirana
Referee: Abbie Hendry (Scotland)

12 April 2026
12:00

Montenegro	5–0	Liechtenstein
Merdović 13', 51' (pen.); Čižek 23', 27'; Nikčević 56'	Report

Egnatia Arena, Rrogozhinë
Referee: Abbie Hendry (Scotland)
12 April 2026
15:00

Turkey	1–0	Albania
Ersen 41'	Report

House of Football Natural Pitch, Tirana
Referee: Jeļena Jermolajeva (Latvia)

15 April 2026
14:00

Montenegro	0–5	Turkey
	Report	Özkür 7'; Ersen 54' (pen.); Yetim 63'; Öztaş 71'; Bilir 84' (pen.)

Egnatia Arena, Rrogozhinë
Referee: Jeļena Jermolajeva (Latvia)
15 April 2026
14:00

Liechtenstein	0–3	Albania
	Report	Leka 47'; Ago 80' (pen.); Malaj 86'

House of Football Natural Pitch, Tirana
Referee: Tjaša Misja (Slovenia)

==== Group B6 ====
Pos	Team	Pld	W	D	L	GF	GA	GD	Pts	Promotion
1	Croatia (H)	3	3	0	0	11	0	+11	9	Promotion to League A for the next season's qualification
2	Czech Republic	3	2	0	1	14	1	+13	6	
3	Georgia	3	1	0	2	4	10	−6	3	
4	Azerbaijan	3	0	0	3	1	19	−18	0	

Source: www.sofascore.com
Rules for classification: Tiebreakers
(H) Hosts
11 April 2026
12:00

Croatia	6–0	Azerbaijan
Prkačin 6'; Akrap 17'; Grgić 33'; Vanjak 37', 58'; Alajbegović 90+4'	Report

Stadion Branko Čavlović-Čavlek, Karlovac
Referee: Henrikke Nervik (Norway)
11 April 2026
14:00

Georgia	0–5	Czech Republic
	Report	Boháčová 4'; Trachtová 31', 45+2', 52'; Rancová 43' (pen.)

Stadion Lučko, Lučko
Referee: Eglantina Pjetrushaj (Albania)

14 April 2026
12:00

Croatia	4–0	Georgia
Grgić 23'; Akrap 34' (pen.); Kalaš 36'; Vekua 51' (o.g.)	Report

Stadion Branko Čavlović-Čavlek, Karlovac
Referee: Angelika Soeder (Germany)
14 April 2026
14:00

Czech Republic	9–0	Azerbaijan
Navrátilová 2', 46', 54'; Řehová 5'; Trachtová 52', 64', 73'; Kroupová 90+4' (pen.); Výtisková 90+6'	Report

Stadion Lučko, Lučko
Referee: Eglantina Pjetrushaj (Albania)

17 April 2026
12:00

Czech Republic	0–1	Croatia
	Report	Prkačin 35'

Stadion Branko Čavlović-Čavlek, Karlovac
Referee: Angelika Soeder (Germany)
17 April 2026
12:00

Azerbaijan	1–4	Georgia
K. Asadova 5' (pen.)	Report	Kaloiani 9'; Jojua 25'; Tsikaridze 83'; Davituliani 90+6'

Stadion Lučko, Lučko
Referee: Henrikke Nervik (Norway)

=== Ranking of second-placed teams ===
Pos	Grp	Team	Pld	W	D	L	GF	GA	GD	Pts	Qualification
1	B4	Belarus	3	2	1	0	5	1	+4	7	Promotion to League A Round 1 2027 UEFA Women's Under-19 Championship qualification
2	B6	Czech Republic	3	2	0	1	14	1	+13	6	
3	B3	Bulgaria	3	2	0	1	13	6	+7	6	
4	B2	Faroe Islands	3	2	0	1	10	6	+4	6	
5	B1	Estonia	3	2	0	1	2	5	−3	6	
6	B5	Albania	3	1	1	1	5	3	+2	4	

Source: UEFA
Rules for classification: 1) points; 2) goal difference; 3) goals scored; 4) disciplinary points; 5) coefficient ranking.

== Goalscorers ==
In the Round 1, there have been 323 goals scored in 78 matches, for an average of 4.14 goals per match (as of 2 December 2025).

In the Round 2, there have been 271 goals scored in 78 matches, for an average of 3.47 goals per match (as of 18 April 2026).

In total, there have been 594 goals scored in 156 matches, for an average of 3.81 goals per match (as of 18 April 2026).

8 goals

- (Czech Republic) Adéla Trachtová
- (Israel) Goren Tamar

7 goals

- (Slovakia) Victoria Havalec

6 goals

- (Austria) Greta Spinn
- (Bosnia and Herzegovina) Ana Jurić
- (Faroe Islands) Sara Benjaminsen
- (Kosovo) Anisa Meha
- (Scotland) Laura Berry
- (Slovenia) Zala Omerza

5 goals

- (Bulgaria) Mariela Petrova
- (Czech Republic) Lucie Kroupová
- (Denmark) Flora Højer
- (Hungary) Petra Gégény
- (Italy) Giulia Galli
- (Montenegro) Maša Tomašević
- (Spain) Celia Segura
- (Switzerland) Emanuela Pfister

4 goals

- (Greece) Panagiota Argyriou
- (Iceland) Berglind Hlynsdóttir
- (Israel) Adee Goulden
- (Luxembourg) Joana Ribeiro
- (Montenegro) Darija Čižek
- (Portugal) Cristina Fernandes
- (Slovakia) Dominika Gondová
- (Slovenia) Špela Gerbec
- (Slovenia) Neža Trost
- (Turkey) Yaren Ersen
- (Wales) Emily Cole

3 goals

- (Austria) Ella Herbst
- (Austria) Denise Lueger
- (Bosnia and Herzegovina) Natalija Mirković
- (Bulgaria) Katerina-Maria Ravnachka
- (Czech Republic) Natálie Navrátilová
- (Denmark) Louise Strauss
- (England) Erica Meg Parkinson
- (Faroe Islands) Kára Sigurðsson
- (Finland) Helmi Kumpulainen
- (France) Justine Rouquet
- (Germany) Rosa Rückert
- (Hungary) Bori Turi
- (Hungary) Borbála Vincze
- (Italy) Rosanna Ventriglia
- (Italy) Caterina Venturelli
- (Latvia) Anna Belova
- (Lithuania) Agata-Marija Kairytė
- (Lithuania) Elzė Kiškūnaitė
- (Montenegro) Jana Merdović
- (Netherlands) Elisa Van Dijk
- (Norway) Anna Malmin
- (Poland) Zuzanna Witek
- (Portugal) Luana Bessa
- (Romania) Maria Isabel Olah
- (Scotland) Olivia Chomczuk
- (Slovakia) Tamara Kramlíková
- (Spain) Alba Cerrato
- (Spain) Ainoa Gómez

2 goals

- (Albania) Klesta Ago
- (Austria) Valentina Illinger
- (Austria) Katie Richter
- (Belarus) Elizaveta Marchuk
- (Bosnia and Herzegovina) Uma Hadžihajdarević
- (Bosnia and Herzegovina) Una Rankić
- (Bulgaria) Monika Baliova
- (Bulgaria) Raya Boneva
- (Croatia) Valentina Akrap
- (Croatia) Antonela Grgić
- (Croatia) Gabrijela Prkačin
- (Croatia) Luana Vanjak
- (Cyprus) Anastasia Mesolongitou
- (Czech Republic) Stella Balázsová
- (Czech Republic) Kristýna Bartošová
- (Czech Republic) Natálie Boháčová
- (Czech Republic) Denisa Rancová
- (Denmark) Nikoline Nielsen
- (England) Vera Jones
- (England) Lauryn Thompson
- (France) Lina Gay
- (France) Léa Morissaint
- (Georgia (country)) Anano Tsikaridze
- (Germany) Maria Penner
- (Germany) Zoe Schick
- (Germany) Felicia Sträßer
- (Germany) Lotta Wrede
- (Iceland) Freyja Stefánsdóttir
- (Israel) Or Divan
- Maayan Ben Israel
- (Italy) Eleonora Ferraresi
- (Italy) Paola Taddei
- (Latvia) Paula Dzene
- (Latvia) Nikola Pinčuka
- (Luxembourg) Vera Villegas
- (Malta) Lexine Farrugia
- (Netherlands) Rose Ivens
- (Netherlands) Liv Pennock
- (North Macedonia) Teona Galabovska
- (North Macedonia) Melanija Grozdanova
- (North Macedonia) Kalina Popeski
- (Norway) Tomine Enger
- (Poland) Julia Langosz
- (Poland) Oliwia Zwiazek
- (Republic of Ireland) Anna Butler
- (Romania) Jasmine Ouatu
- (Romania) Eszter Szoke
- (San Marino) Anna Benedettini
- (Scotland) Sienna McGoldrick
- (Serbia) Maja Cenanović
- (Serbia) Ana Nikolić
- (Serbia) Lana Todorović
- (Slovakia) Lea Bekečová
- (Slovakia) Michaela Pekárová
- (Slovakia) Lucia Rumančíková
- (Slovakia) Terézia Šoltysová
- (Slovenia) Ula Osolnik
- (Slovenia) Kaja Prelovšek
- (Spain) Pau Comendador
- (Spain) Rosalía Domínguez
- (Spain) Irune Dorado
- (Spain) Noa Jiménez
- (Spain) Iris Santiago
- (Sweden) Agnes Ekberg
- (Sweden) Ella Lundin
- (Turkey) Zeynep Bilir
- (Ukraine) Veronika Holovanchuk
- (Ukraine) Diana Tkachuk
- (Wales) Scarlett Hill

1 goal

- (Albania) Bora Bushati
- (Albania) Gelda Kadiolli
- (Albania) Dilajda Leka
- (Albania) Albana Malaj
- (Albania) Klausia Murataj
- (Albania) Xhesika Ndoj
- (Albania) Angela Nika
- (Albania) Adela Qose
- (Armenia) Ruzanna Injyan
- (Austria) Sara Grabovac
- (Austria) Anika Hofschweiger
- (Austria) Anna Osl
- (Austria) Emily Schäfer
- (Austria) Dayna Tuppinger
- (Azerbaijan) Khanım Asadova
- (Azerbaijan) Madina Jurugova
- (Belarus) Veranika Kaliuta
- (Belarus) Diana Katsynel
- (Belarus) Lizaveta Marchuk
- (Belarus) Valeryia Vasiliuk
- (Belarus) Margarita Yurchuk
- (Belgium) Manon Baert
- (Belgium) Chionne Bonny
- (Belgium) Kadhiya De Ceuster
- (Belgium) Marthe Hens
- (Belgium) Flo Hermans
- (Belgium) Fleur Heyman
- (Belgium) Nel Neyrinck
- (Belgium) Eva Spelkens
- (Belgium) Jolien Verhoeven
- (Bosnia and Herzegovina) Amila Abdukić
- (Bosnia and Herzegovina) Elma Brković
- (Bosnia and Herzegovina) Ariana Hafizović
- (Bosnia and Herzegovina) Amina Krpo
- (Bosnia and Herzegovina) Zerina Marković
- (Bosnia and Herzegovina) Bogdana Milićević
- (Bosnia and Herzegovina) Tamara Vukelić
- (Bulgaria) Andrea Boyadzhieva
- (Bulgaria) Gergana Halyanova
- (Croatia) Lea Alajbegović
- (Croatia) Emma Babić
- (Croatia) Gia Kalaš
- (Cyprus) Estela Eleftheriou
- (Cyprus) Anna Matsoukari
- (Cyprus) Sophia Krys Mylona
- (Czech Republic) Andrea Gajdušková
- (Czech Republic) Nela Řehová
- (Czech Republic) Diana Šafářová
- (Czech Republic) Natálie Tichá
- (Czech Republic) Eliška Truksová
- (Czech Republic) Karolína Výtisková
- (Denmark) Emilie Luplau
- (Denmark) Alberte Mott
- (England) May Cruft
- (England) Layla Drury
- (England) Eva Hendle
- (England) Olivia Hibbert-Johnson
- (England) Chloe Hylton
- (England) Rachel Maltby
- (England) Zara Shaw
- (England) Lois Shooter
- (England) Taylor Warren
- (Estonia) Anželika Jotkina
- (Estonia) Aleksandra Kelli
- (Faroe Islands) Birita Mohr
- (Finland) Ilona Heinonen
- (Finland) Aada Mäkelä
- (Finland) Reeta Pirilä
- (Finland) Olivia Ulenius
- (France) Anaïs Ebayilin
- (France) Ornella Graziani
- (France) Romane Rafalski
- (France) Almudena Sierra
- (Georgia (country)) Anastasia Buchukuri
- (Georgia (country)) Ani Davituliani
- (Georgia (country)) Mariami Gogoladze
- (Georgia (country)) Natia Jojua
- (Georgia (country)) Lolita Kaloiani
- (Germany) Lany Bäcker
- (Germany) Helen Börner
- (Germany) Leni Eggert
- (Germany) Marie Gmeineder
- (Germany) Laila Portella
- (Germany) Kassandra Potsi
- (Germany) Jonna Maj Wrede
- (Germany) Amy Wrigge
- (Greece) Myrto Kolempa
- (Greece) Evangelia Nanou
- (Greece) Ilektra Tzourtzevits
- (Hungary) Zille Gágyor
- (Hungary) Vanda Hanász
- (Hungary) Olivia Pethe
- (Hungary) Melissza Szabó
- (Hungary) Victoria Vinals
- (Iceland) Karlotta Björk Andradóttir
- (Iceland) Líf Joostdóttir Van Bemme
- (Iceland) Ragnheiður Þórunn Jónsdóttir
- (Iceland) Edith Kristín Kristjánsdóttir
- (Iceland) Jónína Linnet
- (Israel) Tamar Arkobi
- (Israel) Talia Darah Camin
- (Israel) Shay Elmaleh
- (Israel) Ziv Roth Hazan
- (Israel) Talya Mor
- (Israel) Mia Shvill
- (Kazakhstan) Nazym Aldanazar
- (Kazakhstan) Yelizaveta Medvedeva
- (Kosovo) Imeraj Aurela
- (Kosovo) Mirjeta Januzi
- (Kosovo) Leonesa Lecaj
- (Kosovo) Riga Kallaba
- (Kosovo) Adela Sinani
- (Latvia) Jekaterina Haritonova
- (Latvia) Laura Kallase
- (Latvia) Nikola Preijere
- (Latvia) Amber Prymak
- (Latvia) Līva Šteinberga
- (Lithuania) Justina Blaževičūtė
- (Lithuania) Austėja Jokubaitytė
- (Lithuania) Austėja Pocevičiūtė
- (Lithuania) Estela Tamošauskaitė
- (Luxembourg) Lena Alves
- (Luxembourg) Aina Fernandez Berenguer
- (Luxembourg) Charlie Jorge
- (Luxembourg) Olivia Konsbruck
- (Luxembourg) Federica Morvilli
- (Luxembourg) Jenny Soares
- (Malta) Nyorah Celeste
- (Malta) Emma Sophia Flannery
- (Malta) Stella Francalanza
- (Malta) Ema Micallef
- (Moldova) Nicole Maria Kleyner
- (Montenegro) Nađa Doknić
- (Montenegro) Angelina Dresaj
- (Montenegro) Jelena Nikčević
- (Netherlands) Hester Algra
- (Netherlands) Anne Gelevert
- (Netherlands) Juul Oudenampsen
- (Netherlands) Lina Touzani
- (North Macedonia) Emili Mitkovska
- (Northern Ireland) Rhianna Breen
- (Northern Ireland) Daisy Conway
- (Northern Ireland) Jessica McGuinness
- (Northern Ireland) Darcie McNeill
- (Norway) Tilde Andersson
- (Norway) Ina Raaum Andreassen
- (Norway) Luisa Galteland
- (Norway) Anny Kerim-Lindland
- (Norway) Karna Sødahl
- (Norway) Julie Steen
- (Poland) Weronika Araśniewicz
- (Poland) Krystyna Flis
- (Poland) Aisha Nsangou
- (Poland) Magda Piekarska
- (Poland) Małgorzata Rogus
- (Poland) Lena Świrska
- (Poland) Oliwia Zgoda
- (Poland) Maja Zielińska
- (Portugal) Cíntia Martins
- (Portugal) Rita Melo
- (Portugal) Carolina Tristão
- (Portugal) Joana Valente
- (Republic of Ireland) Della Cowper-Grey
- (Republic of Ireland) Hazel Donegan
- (Republic of Ireland) Hannah Healy
- (Republic of Ireland) Katie Lawlee
- (Republic of Ireland) Finley Newell
- (Republic of Ireland) Maeve Wollmer
- (Romania) Alexia Niculescu
- (San Marino) Greta Paone
- (Scotland) Sophie Black
- (Scotland) Jessica Husband
- (Scotland) Sophia Martin
- (Scotland) Isla Taylor
- (Scotland) Abigail Tobin
- (Scotland) Ella West
- (Scotland) Izzy Young
- (Serbia) Milica Draganić
- (Serbia) Masa Ninković
- (Serbia) Katarina Popov
- (Serbia) Tijana Popović
- (Serbia) Hana Sinanović
- (Serbia) Paulina Stanić
- (Serbia) Zoja Topalov
- (Serbia) Lana Zarubica
- (Slovakia) Katarína Bučková
- (Slovakia) Vanessa Hrušovská
- (Slovakia) Matilda Sluková
- (Slovenia) Zoja Šrot
- (Spain) Emma Moreno
- (Spain) Anna Quer
- (Sweden) Thindra Mattsson
- (Sweden) Augusta Priks
- (Sweden) Filippa Sjöström
- (Switzerland) Rahel Hinder
- (Switzerland) Alyssa Keller
- (Switzerland) Émilie Mece
- (Switzerland) Johanna Thüer
- (Switzerland) Tiffany Vonnez
- (Turkey) Miray Ayhan
- (Turkey) Yaren Beyazgul
- (Turkey) Lucia Özkür
- (Turkey) Sude Öztaş
- (Turkey) Ecemnur Öztürk
- (Turkey) Zeliya Şengül
- (Turkey) Ela Yetim
- (Ukraine) Yevheniia Bielova
- (Ukraine) Emiliia Kanakhovska
- (Ukraine) Olena Martseniuk
- (Wales) Ffion Bowen
- (Wales) Casi Gregson
- (Wales) Nia Lewis

1 own goal

- (Belarus) Hanna Hadzinskaya (against Northern Ireland)
- (Bulgaria) Silyana Mihaleva (against Sweden)
- (Cyprus) Victoria Eve Vlachou (against Slovenia)
- (Denmark) Asta Kynde (against Iceland)
- (Denmark) Alberte Mott (against Iceland)
- (Finland) Aada Mäkelä (against France)
- (Georgia (country)) Nini Vekua (against Croatia)
- (Greece) Konstantina Platania (against England)
- (Italy) Lidia Consolini (against Northern Ireland)
- (Kosovo) Mirjeta Januzi (against Denmark)
- (Moldova) Vitalina Emelina (against Kosovo)
- (Netherlands) Esra Luna Neter (against Scotland)
- (Netherlands) Suze Wassink (against Norway)
- (Norway) Emilie Kvalvågnes Guddal (against the Netherlands)
- (Northern Ireland) Zara Boyd (against Spain)
- (Northern Ireland) Ellen Hampton (against Belarus)
- (Turkey) Selen Yarayan (against Wales)
- (Wales) Cadi Rodgers (against England)
