= Cyprus women's national under-19 football team =

Cyprus Women's U-19
- Association: Cyprus Football Association
- Confederation: UEFA (Europe)
- Head coach: Christina Pitsilliou
- FIFA code: CYP

First international
- Spain 9–0 Cyprus, (25 September 2008)

Biggest win
- Cyprus 8–0 Azerbaijan, (2 December 2010)

Biggest defeat
- Switzerland 15–0 Cyprus, (25 October 2023)

UEFA Women's Under-19 Championship
- Appearances: 0

FIFA U-20 Women's World Cup
- Appearances: 0

The Cypriot women's national under-19 football team represents Cyprus at the UEFA Women's Under-19 Championship and the FIFA U-20 Women's World Cup.

== Results and schedule ==
The following is a list of match results from the previous 12 months, as well as any future matches that have been scheduled.

=== 2025 ===
26 November 2025 2026 UEFA Women's Under-19 Championship qualification – Round 1 – Group B1	Cyprus	1–3	Montenegro	Stara Pazova, Serbia
12:00 EET	Eleftheriou 79'	Report	Tomašević 15', 52' (pen.); Čižek 65'	Stadium: Serbian FA Sports Center; Referee: Stacey Pearson (England)

29 November 2025 2026 UEFA Women's Under-19 Championship qualification – Round 1 – Group B1	Serbia	8–0	Cyprus	Stara Pazova, Serbia
15:00 EET	Ninković 3'; Topalov 17'; Zarubica 35'; Todorović 55'; Popović 59'; Cenanović 63'; Nikolić 68'; Popov 90+4'	Report		Stadium: Serbian FA Sports Center; Referee: Sara Telek (Austria)

2 December 2025 2026 UEFA Women's Under-19 Championship qualification – Round 1 – Group B1	Armenia	0–1	Cyprus	Stara Pazova, Serbia
13:00 EET		Report	Mylona 45+2'	Stadium: Serbian FA Sports Center; Referee: Marta San Juan (Andorra)

=== 2026 ===
27 February 2026 2026 UEFA Women's Under-19 Championship qualification – Round 2 – Group B1	Cyprus	0–2	Slovenia	Dogana, San Marino
12:00 EET		Report	Osolnik 30'; Vlachou 32' (o.g.)	Stadium: Stadio Ezio Conti di Dogana; Referee: Vesna Miletić (Bosnia and Herzegovina)

2 March 2026 2026 UEFA Women's Under-19 Championship qualification – Round 2 – Group B1	Estonia	1–0	Cyprus	Dogana, San Marino
12:00 EET	Jotkina 22'	Report		Stadium: Stadio Ezio Conti di Dogana; Referee: Kristina Kozoroh (Ukraine)

5 March 2026 2026 UEFA Women's Under-19 Championship qualification – Round 2 – Group B1	San Marino	2–3	Cyprus	Acquaviva, San Marino
12:00 EET	Paone 60'; Benedettini 82' (pen.)	Report	Mesolongitou 2', 50'; Matsoukari 38'	Stadium: Acquaviva Stadium; Referee: Kristina Kozoroh (Ukraine)

6 October 2026 Friendly	Montenegro	4–0	Cyprus	Podgorica, Montenegro
12:00 EEST	Dizdarević 29'; Merdović 58' (pen.); Luković 59', 72'	Report

8 October 2026 Friendly	Montenegro	3–1	Cyprus	Podgorica, Montenegro
12:00 EEST	Merdović 20'; Luković 49'; Radović 54'	Report	Christofi 90+2'

27 November 2026 2027 UEFA Women's Under-19 Championship qualification – Round 1 – Group B1	Cyprus	v	Albania	Tirana, Albania
15:00 EET		Report		Stadium: House of Football

30 November 2026 2027 UEFA Women's Under-19 Championship qualification – Round 1 – Group B1	Latvia	v	Cyprus	Rrogozhinë, Albania
13:00 EET		Report		Stadium: Egnatia Arena

3 December 2026 2027 UEFA Women's Under-19 Championship qualification – Round 1 – Group B1	Moldova	v	Cyprus	Rrogozhinë, Albania
15:00 EET		Report		Stadium: Egnatia Arena

- CFA

== Euro 2027 Under-19 Championship qualification ==
=== 2026 UEFA Women's Under-19 Championship qualification ===
==== Group B1 ====
Pos	Team	Pld	W	D	L	GF	GA	GD	Pts	Promotion or transfer
1	Latvia	0	0	0	0	0	0	0	0	Promotion to Round 2 League A
2	Albania (H)	0	0	0	0	0	0	0	0	Transfer to Round 2 League B
3	Cyprus	0	0	0	0	0	0	0	0	Transfer to Round 2 League B
4	Moldova	0	0	0	0	0	0	0	0	Transfer to Round 2 League B

First match(es) will be played: 27 November 2026. Source: UEFA
Rules for classification: Tiebreakers
(H) Hosts

== Players ==
=== Current squad ===
As of 21 November 2026

The following players were called up for the 2027 UEFA Women's Under-19 Championship qualification matches in Albania between 27 November and 3 December 2026.

No.	Pos.	Player	Date of birth (age)	Caps	Goals	Club
	GK	Veronika Hadjichristodoulou	19 August 2008 (age 18)	8	0	(Cyprus Football Association) Omonia
	GK	Milena Peppou	13 July 2009 (age 17)	1	0	(Cyprus Football Association) Omonia
	DF	Georgiana Tsiola	22 April 2008 (age 18)	4	0	(Cyprus Football Association) Lakatamia
	DF	Lila Francis Efstathiou	25 July 2009 (age 17)	0	0	(Cyprus Football Association) Aris Limassol
	DF	Chrisilia Angeli	27 April 2010 (age 16)	1	0	(Cyprus Football Association) Omonia
	DF	Gracie Holmes	5 June 2008 (age 18)	6	0	(United States Soccer Federation) Saint Leo Lions
	DF	Eleonora Constantinou		0	0	(Cyprus Football Association) Pafos
	MF	Kyra Hilmi	24 February 2009 (age 17)	2	0	(The Football Association) Maidenhead United
	MF	Theofano Limantzaki	3 July 2009 (age 17)	2	0	(Cyprus Football Association) Geroskipou
	MF	Kyriaki Panagi	11 January 2010 (age 16)	2	0	(Cyprus Football Association) Ethnikos Achnas
	MF	Michaela Georgiou	20 November 2010 (age 16)	2	0	(Cyprus Football Association) Ethnikos Achnas
	MF	Maria Dimitropoulou	31 December 2009 (age 16)	2	0	(Cyprus Football Association) Olympiakos Nicosia
	MF	Styliana Aspraki	22 October 2009 (age 17)	2	0	(Cyprus Football Association) Olympiacos Nicosia
	MF	Eleftheria Poulli	1 December 2010 (age 15)	2	0	(Cyprus Football Association) Peyia Akamas
	FW	Charalambia Epaminonda	17 March 2008 (age 18)	4	0	(Cyprus Football Association) Apollon
	FW	Artemis Petkovski	3 December 2008 (age 17)	3	0	(Cyprus Football Association) Lakatamia
	FW	Mariam Symeou	13 December 2010 (age 15)	2	0	(Cyprus Football Association) Omonia
	FW	Natalia Solonos	30 May 2009 (age 17)	3	0	(Cyprus Football Association) Omonia
	FW	Andriana Christofi	4 August 2009 (age 17)	2	1	(Cyprus Football Association) Peyia Akamas

=== Recent call-ups ===
- The following players have been called up to a Greece squad in the past 12 months.

Pos.	Player	Date of birth (age)	Caps	Goals	Club	Latest call-up
GK	Despoina Konstantinidi	26 March 2009 (age 17)	1	0	(Cyprus) Olympiacos Nicosia	v. San Marino, 5 March 2026
DF	Panagiota Fotiou	18 July 2008 (age 18)	8	0	(Cyprus) Apollon	v. Montenegro, 8 October 2026
DF	Eleni Christoforou	8 January 2009 (age 17)	1	0	(Cyprus) Aris Limassol	v. Montenegro, 8 October 2026
DF	Marina Christoforou	16 November 2009 (age 17)	2	0	(Cyprus) Omonia	v. Montenegro, 8 October 2026
DF	Elena Michail	16 February 2007 (age 19)	12	0	(Cyprus) Apollon	v. San Marino, 5 March 2026
DF	Victoria Vlachou	10 February 2007 (age 19)	7	0	(Cyprus) Xylofagou	v. San Marino, 5 March 2026
DF	Kyriaki Vlachou	10 February 2007 (age 19)	6	0		v. San Marino, 5 March 2026
MF	Andriana Tsoukka	15 June 2007 (age 19)	7	0	(Cyprus) Apollon	v. San Marino, 5 March 2026
MF	Charikleia Georgiou	31 July 2008 (age 18)	6	0		v. San Marino, 5 March 2026
MF	Maria Eleni Louca	25 June 2007 (age 19)	6	0		v. San Marino, 5 March 2026
MF	Ioanna Ellina	1 October 2007 (age 19)	10	0	(United States) Monroe Mustangs	v. San Marino, 5 March 2026
MF	Panagiota Makridi	4 June 2007 (age 19)	4	0		v. Armenia, 2 December 2025
MF	Despoina Polyviou	25 August 2008 (age 18)	2	0	(United States) Northwestern Red Raiders	v. Armenia, 2 December 2025
FW	Sophia Mylona	8 June 2007 (age 19)	10	2	(Cyprus) Aris Limassol	v. San Marino, 5 March 2026
FW	Anna Matsoukari	28 January 2007 (age 19)	13	1	(Cyprus) Omonia	v. San Marino, 5 March 2026
FW	Estela Eleftheriou	22 May 2007 (age 19)	12	2	(Cyprus) Omonia	v. San Marino, 5 March 2026
FW	Anastasia Mesolongitou	26 March 2007 (age 19)	8	2	(Cyprus) Omonia	v. San Marino, 5 March 2026
FW	Christina Xenofontos	2 June 2007 (age 19)	5	0	Free agent	v. Armenia, 2 December 2025
FW	Marina Constantinou	4 January 2008 (age 18)	4	0	(Cyprus) Omonia	v. Armenia, 2 December 2025

== History ==
=== UEFA Women's Under-19 Championship ===
The Cypriot team has never qualified for the UEFA Women's Under-19 Championship.

Year	Result	Matches	Wins	Draws	Losses	GF	GA
Two-legged final 1998	did not Qualify						
(Sweden) 1999	did not Qualify						
(France) 2000	did not Qualify						
(Norway) 2001	did not Qualify						
(Sweden) 2002	did not Qualify						
(Germany) 2003	did not Qualify						
(Finland) 2004	did not Qualify						
(Hungary) 2005	did not Qualify						
(Switzerland) 2006	did not Qualify						
(Iceland) 2007	did not Qualify						
(France) 2008	did not Qualify						
(Belarus) 2009	did not Qualify						
(North Macedonia) 2010	did not Qualify						
(Italy) 2011	did not Qualify						
(Turkey) 2012	did not Qualify						
(Wales) 2013	did not Qualify						
(Norway) 2014	did not Qualify						
(Israel) 2015	did not Qualify						
(Slovakia) 2016	did not Qualify						
(Northern Ireland) 2017	did not Qualify						
(Switzerland) 2018	did not Qualify						
(Scotland) 2019	did not Qualify						
(Georgia (country)) ~~2020~~	Cancelled due to the COVID-19 pandemic						
(Belarus) ~~2021~~	Cancelled due to the COVID-19 pandemic						
(Czech Republic) 2022	did not qualify						
(Belgium) 2023	did not qualify						
(Lithuania) 2024	did not qualify						
(Poland) 2025	did not qualify						
(Bosnia and Herzegovina) 2026	did not qualify						
(Hungary) 2027	TBD						
Total	0/26	0	0	0	0	0	0

== See also ==
- Cyprus women's national football team
- Cyprus women's national under-17 football team
- FIFA U-20 Women's World Cup
- UEFA Women's Under-19 Championship
