= 2027 UEFA Women's Under-19 Championship qualification =

Tournament details
- Dates: Round 1: 6 October – 5 December 2026; Round 2: Spring 2027
- Teams: 52 (from 1 confederation)

Tournament statistics
- Matches played: 18
- Goals scored: 104 (5.78 per match)
- Top scorer(s): (Czech Republic) Stella Balázsová (Denmark) Mila Bischoff (Republic of Ireland) Anna Butler (6 goals each)
- All statistics correct as of 13 October 2026.

The 2027 UEFA Women's Under-19 Championship qualification is an under-19 women's national football team competition that will determine the seven teams joining the automatically qualified host team Hungary in the 2027 UEFA Women's Under-19 Championship final tournament.

Two national teams decided not to participate in the event, and Russia were excluded from the tournament due to the ongoing invasion of Ukraine. Therefore, including host Hungary, 52 teams entered this qualification competition. Round 1 of the qualification runs from Autumn 2026, while Round 2 will be played in spring 2027. Players born on or after 1 January 2008 are eligible to participate.

== Format ==
The qualification consisted of two rounds, both with teams playing in two-tiered leagues. Each round league consisted of several groups, which are played as single-round-robin mini-tournaments, with one team from each group selected as the host after the draw.

- Round 1:
  - League A: 28 teams were drawn into seven groups of four. The top three teams from each group will advance to Round 2 League A; teams that finish fourth will be relegated to Round 2 League B.
  - League B: 24 teams were drawn into six groups of four. The group winners and the best runner-up team will be promoted to Round 2 League A; the other teams will be transferred to Round 2 League B.
- Round 2:
  - League A: 28 teams will be drawn into seven groups of four. The group winners will qualify for the final tournament. If Hungary, as the host of the final tournament, wins one of these groups, the best runner-up team will also qualify. Teams that will finish fourth will be relegated to Round 1 League B for the next season.
  - League B: 24 teams will be drawn into six groups of four. The group winners and the best runner-up team will be promoted to Round 1 League A for the next season.

=== Tiebreakers ===
In a group, teams are ranked according to points (3 points for a win, 1 point for a draw, 0 points for a loss), and if tied on points, the following tiebreaking criteria are applied, in the order given, to determine the rankings (Regulations Articles 17.01 and 17.02):

1. Points in head-to-head matches among tied teams;
2. Goal difference in head-to-head matches among tied teams;
3. Goals scored in head-to-head matches among tied teams;
4. If more than two teams were tied, and after applying all head-to-head criteria above, a subset of teams were still tied, all head-to-head criteria above were reapplied exclusively to this subset of teams;
5. Goal difference in all group matches;
6. Goals scored in all group matches;
7. Penalty shoot-out if only two teams have the same number of points, and they met in the last round of the group and were tied after applying all criteria above (not used if more than two teams have the same number of points, or if their rankings were not relevant for qualification for the next stage);
8. Disciplinary points (red card = 3 points, yellow card = 1 point, expulsion for two yellow cards in one match = 3 points);
9. Position in the applicable ranking:
  1. for teams in Round 1, position in the 2025–26 Round 2 league rankings;
  2. for teams in Round 2, position in the Round 1 league rankings.

To determine the best runner-up team in League B, the following criteria are applied (Regulations Article 18.03):

1. Points;
2. Goal difference;
3. Goals scored;
4. Disciplinary points;
5. Position in the applicable ranking:
  1. for teams in Round 1, position in the 2025–26 Round 2 league rankings;
  2. for teams in Round 2, position in the Round 1 league rankings.

== Round 1 ==
=== Draw ===
The draw for the Round 1 was held on 11 June 2026, at the UEFA headquarters in Nyon, Switzerland.

The 52 participating teams were split into two Leagues (28 in League A, 24 in League B) according to their final group standings of Round 2 of the 2025–26 competition (Regulations Article 13.01). To determine this ranking, the following criteria were followed:

1. higher position in the following classification:
  1. Round 2 League A group winners
  2. Round 2 League A group runners-up
  3. Round 2 League A third-placed teams
  4. Teams promoted from Round 2 League B
  5. Teams relegated from Round 2 League A
  6. Round 2 League B runners-up
  7. Round 2 League B third-placed teams
  8. Round 2 League B fourth-placed teams
2. higher number of points in all mini-tournament matches;
3. superior goal difference in all mini-tournament matches;
4. higher number of goals scored in all mini-tournament matches;
5. lower disciplinary points (red card = 3 points, yellow card = 1 point, expulsion for two yellow cards in one match = 3 points);
6. higher position in the 2025–26 Round 1 league rankings.

Within each League, the teams were allocated to four drawing pots (seven teams per pot in League A; six teams per pot in League B). Teams in the same pot would be drawn into different groups, with League A consisting of seven groups of four teams, and League B consisting of six groups of four teams.

Teams entering League A

The 21 teams of the previous season's Round 2 League A (top three teams in each group) and the seven teams of Round 2 League B (six group winners and the best runner-up) were drawn into seven groups of four teams. The Round 2 League A group winners were automatically seeded into Pot 1, the second- and third-placed teams into Pots 2 and 3, respectively. The previous season's Round 2 League B teams were seeded into Pot 4; their matches against the fourth-placed teams in their group did not count towards this ranking (Regulations Article 13.02).

Pos	Gr (Rk)	Team	Pld	W	D	L	GF	GA	GD	Pts	Seeding
1	A6 (1)	Germany	3	3	0	0	9	3	+6	9	Pot 1
2	A1 (1)	Switzerland	3	3	0	0	7	1	+6	9	Pot 1
3	A2 (1)	Poland	3	2	1	0	7	0	+7	7	Pot 1
4	A7 (1)	Spain	3	2	1	0	6	0	+6	7	Pot 1
5	A3 (1)	Iceland	3	2	1	0	7	3	+4	7	Pot 1
6	A5 (1)	Sweden	3	2	1	0	3	1	+2	7	Pot 1
7	A4 (1)	Austria	3	2	0	1	8	2	+6	6	Pot 1
8	A7 (2)	Portugal	3	2	1	0	4	0	+4	7	Pot 2
9	A4 (2)	Scotland	3	2	0	1	12	3	+9	6	Pot 2
10	A5 (2)	Netherlands	3	2	0	1	8	3	+5	6	Pot 2
11	A3 (2)	Denmark	3	2	0	1	5	4	+1	6	Pot 2
12	A1 (2)	Wales	3	2	0	1	6	6	0	6	Pot 2
13	A2 (2)	Greece	3	2	0	1	2	3	−1	6	Pot 2
14	A6 (2)	France	3	1	1	1	5	5	0	4	Pot 2
15	A4 (3)	Norway	3	2	0	1	5	3	+2	6	Pot 3
16	A3 (3)	Finland	3	1	1	1	3	3	0	4	Pot 3
17	A2 (3)	Belgium	3	1	1	1	1	1	0	4	Pot 3
18	A5 (3)	Italy	3	1	1	1	3	5	−2	4	Pot 3
19	A1 (3)	England	3	1	0	2	7	5	+2	3	Pot 3
20	A6 (3)	Slovakia	3	1	0	2	5	7	−2	3	Pot 3
21	A7 (3)	Northern Ireland	3	0	1	2	1	5	−4	1	Pot 3
22	B3 (1)	Israel	3	3	0	0	15	2	+13	9	Pot 4
23	B1 (1)	Slovenia	3	3	0	0	14	1	+13	9	Pot 4
24	B5 (1)	Turkey	3	3	0	0	12	0	+12	9	Pot 4
25	B6 (1)	Croatia	3	3	0	0	11	0	+11	9	Pot 4
26	B4 (1)	Bosnia and Herzegovina	3	2	1	0	9	2	+7	7	Pot 4
27	B2 (1)	Kosovo	3	2	0	1	11	3	+8	6	Pot 4
28	B4 (2)	Belarus	3	2	1	0	5	1	+4	7	Pot 4

Source: UEFA
Rules for classification: 1) round 1 position; 2) points; 3) goal difference; 4) goals scored; 5) disciplinary points; 6) position in the applicable rankings.

Teams entering League B

The seven fourth-placed teams of the previous season's Round 2 League A and the 17 non-promoted teams of Round 2 League B were drawn into six groups of four teams. The best six fourth-placed teams of Round 2 League A were automatically seeded into Pot 1. The seventh fourth-placed team of Round 2 League A and the runner-up teams of Round 2 League B were seeded into Pot 2. The third- and fourth-placed teams of the previous season's Round 2 League B were seeded into Pots 3 and 4, respectively. The matches of the second- and third-placed teams of Round 2 League B against the fourth-placed teams in their group did not count towards this ranking (Regulations Article 13.02).

Pos	Gr (Rk)	Team	Pld	W	D	L	GF	GA	GD	Pts	Seeding
1	A6 (4)	Republic of Ireland	3	0	1	2	3	7	−4	1	Pot 1
2	A7 (4)	Hungary	3	0	1	2	1	7	−6	1	Pot 1
3=	A5 (4)	Ukraine	3	0	0	3	0	5	−5	0	Pot 1
3=	A3 (4)	Serbia	3	0	0	3	0	5	−5	0	Pot 1
5	A2 (4)	Romania	3	0	0	3	0	6	−6	0	Pot 1
6	A1 (4)	Latvia	3	0	0	3	2	10	−8	0	Pot 1
7	A4 (4)	North Macedonia	3	0	0	3	0	17	−17	0	Pot 2
8	B6 (2)	Czech Republic	3	2	0	1	14	1	+13	6	Pot 2
9	B3 (2)	Bulgaria	3	2	0	1	13	6	+7	6	Pot 2
10	B2 (2)	Faroe Islands	3	2	0	1	10	6	+4	6	Pot 2
11	B1 (2)	Estonia	3	2	0	1	2	5	−3	6	Pot 2
12	B5 (2)	Albania	3	1	1	1	5	3	+2	4	Pot 2
13	B5 (3)	Montenegro	3	1	1	1	7	7	0	4	Pot 3
14	B2 (3)	Lithuania	3	1	1	1	3	4	−1	4	Pot 3
15	B4 (3)	Luxembourg	3	1	0	2	5	7	−2	3	Pot 3
16	B1 (3)	Cyprus	3	1	0	2	3	5	−2	3	Pot 3
17	B6 (3)	Georgia	3	1	0	2	4	1O	—	3	Pot 3
18	B3 (3)	Malta	3	1	0	2	1	13	−12	3	Pot 3
19	B2 (4)	Moldova	3	0	1	2	1	12	−11	1	Pot 4
20	B3 (4)	Kazakhstan	3	0	0	3	1	9	−8	0	Pot 4
21	B4 4)	Armenia	3	0	0	3	1	10	−9	0	Pot 4
22	B5 (4)	Liechtenstein	3	0	0	3	0	14	−14	0	Pot 4
23	B6 (4)	Azerbaijan	3	0	0	3	1	19	−18	0	Pot 4
24	New entry	Andorra	—	—	—	—	—	—	—	0	Pot 4

Source: UEFA
Rules for classification: 1) round 1 position; 2) points; 3) goal difference; 4) goals scored; 5) disciplinary points; 6) position in the applicable rankings.

Did not enter

- Gibraltar
- San Marino

Banned

- Russia

=== League A ===
Times are CET/CEST, (Note: CEST (UTC+2) for dates up to 25 October 2026, and CET (UTC+1) for dates thereafter.) as listed by UEFA (local times, if different, are in parentheses).

==== Group A1 ====
Pos	Team	Pld	W	D	L	GF	GA	GD	Pts	Transfer or relegation
1	Austria (H)	0	0	0	0	0	0	0	0	Transfer to Round 2 League A
2	Scotland	0	0	0	0	0	0	0	0	Transfer to Round 2 League A
3	Northern Ireland	0	0	0	0	0	0	0	0	Transfer to Round 2 League A
4	Belarus	0	0	0	0	0	0	0	0	Relegation to Round 2 League B

First match(es) will be played: 28 November 2026. Source: UEFA
Rules for classification: Tiebreakers
(H) Hosts
28 November 2026
12:00

Northern Ireland	v	Scotland
	Report

Stadion Wiener Neustadt, Wiener Neustadt
28 November 2026
17:00

Austria	v	Belarus
	Report

ÖFB-Campus, Vienna

1 December 2026
11:30

Austria	v	Northern Ireland
	Report

ÖFB-Campus, Vienna
1 December 2026
15:30

Scotland	v	Belarus
	Report

Stadion Wiener Neustadt, Wiener Neustadt

4 December 2026
15:00

Scotland	v	Austria
	Report

ÖFB-Campus, Vienna
4 December 2026
15:00

Belarus	v	Northern Ireland
	Report

Stadion Wiener Neustadt, Wiener Neustadt

==== Group A2 ====
Pos	Team	Pld	W	D	L	GF	GA	GD	Pts	Transfer or relegation
1	Spain	0	0	0	0	0	0	0	0	Transfer to Round 2 League A
2	Wales	0	0	0	0	0	0	0	0	Transfer to Round 2 League A
3	Italy	0	0	0	0	0	0	0	0	Transfer to Round 2 League A
4	Israel (H)	0	0	0	0	0	0	0	0	Relegation to Round 2 League B

First match(es) will be played: 27 November 2026. Source: UEFA
Rules for classification: Tiebreakers
(H) Hosts
27 November 2026
09:30

Spain	v	Israel
	Report

27 November 2026
13:30

Italy	v	Wales
	Report

30 November 2026
09:30

Wales	v	Israel
	Report

30 November 2026
13:30

Spain	v	Italy
	Report

3 December 2026
09:30

Wales	v	Spain
	Report

3 December 2026
13:30

Israel	v	Italy
	Report

==== Group A3 ====
Pos	Team	Pld	W	D	L	GF	GA	GD	Pts	Transfer or relegation
1	Poland	0	0	0	0	0	0	0	0	Transfer to Round 2 League A
2	Greece	0	0	0	0	0	0	0	0	Transfer to Round 2 League A
3	Slovakia (H)	0	0	0	0	0	0	0	0	Transfer to Round 2 League A
4	Kosovo	0	0	0	0	0	0	0	0	Relegation to Round 2 League B

First match(es) will be played: 27 November 2026. Source: UEFA
Rules for classification: Tiebreakers
(H) Hosts
27 November 2026
11:00

Poland	v	Kosovo
	Report

Football Academy Dunajská Streda, Dunajska Streda
27 November 2026
16:30

Slovakia	v	Greece
	Report

National Training Centre, Senec

30 November 2026
11:00

Greece	v	Kosovo
	Report

Football Academy Dunajská Streda, Dunajska Streda
30 November 2026
16:30

Poland	v	Slovakia
	Report

National Training Centre, Senec

3 December 2026
11:00

Greece	v	Poland
	Report

Football Academy Dunajská Streda, Dunajska Streda
3 December 2026
11:00

Kosovo	v	Slovakia
	Report

National Training Centre, Senec

==== Group A4 ====
Pos	Team	Pld	W	D	L	GF	GA	GD	Pts	Transfer or relegation
1	Sweden	0	0	0	0	0	0	0	0	Transfer to Round 2 League A
2	Portugal (H)	0	0	0	0	0	0	0	0	Transfer to Round 2 League A
3	Finland	0	0	0	0	0	0	0	0	Transfer to Round 2 League A
4	Turkey	0	0	0	0	0	0	0	0	Relegation to Round 2 League B

First match(es) will be played: 29 November 2026. Source: UEFA
Rules for classification: Tiebreakers
(H) Hosts
29 November 2026
12:00

Sweden	v	Turkey
	Report

Estádio Nacional, Oeiras
29 November 2026
18:30

Finland	v	Portugal
	Report

Cidade do Futebol, Oeiras

2 December 2026
12:00

Sweden	v	Finland
	Report

Cidade do Futebol, Oeiras
2 December 2026
17:00

Portugal	v	Turkey
	Report

Cidade do Futebol, Oeiras

5 December 2026
17:00

Portugal	v	Sweden
	Report

Cidade do Futebol, Oeiras
5 December 2026
17:00

Turkey	v	Finland
	Report

Cidade do Futebol, Oeiras

==== Group A5 ====
Pos	Team	Pld	W	D	L	GF	GA	GD	Pts	Transfer or relegation
1	Denmark	3	3	0	0	15	4	+11	9	Transfer to Round 2 League A
2	England	3	1	1	1	9	7	+2	4	Transfer to Round 2 League A
3	Switzerland	3	1	1	1	6	9	−3	4	Transfer to Round 2 League A
4	Bosnia and Herzegovina (H)	3	0	0	3	2	12	−10	0	Relegation to Round 2 League B

Source: UEFA
Rules for classification: Tiebreakers
(H) Hosts
7 October 2026
13:00

Switzerland	2–1	Bosnia and Herzegovina
Looser 17'; Edelmann 90+1'	Report	Aličković 55' (pen.)

FA Training Centre, Zenica
Referee: Elisabet Calvo Valentín (Spain)
7 October 2026
13:00

England	1–5	Denmark
Shooter 20' (pen.)	Report	Nielsen 15'; Bischoff 30', 75'; Ludvigsen 62'; Thierry 73'

Mladost Stadium, Kakanj
Referee: Lizzy Van Der Helm (Netherlands)

10 October 2026
13:00

Switzerland	2–2	England
Bornemann 3'; Kott 77'	Report	Shooter 15'; Teer-Hutchins 61'

FA Training Centre, Zenica
Referee: Tatyana Sorokopudova (Kazakhstan)
10 October 2026
13:00

Denmark	4–1	Bosnia and Herzegovina
Bischoff 46'; Ludvigsen 48', 66'; Petersen 76'	Report	Mujdžić 78'

Mladost Stadium, Kakanj
Referee: Lizzy Van Der Helm (Netherlands)

13 October 2026
13:00

Denmark	6–2	Switzerland
Bischoff 5', 41', 45+1'; Petersen 51'; Ludvigsen 76'; Kynde 83'	Report	Edelmann 16'; Vonnez 80'

Mladost Stadium, Kakanj
Referee: Tatyana Sorokopudova (Kazakhstan)
13 October 2026
13:00

Bosnia and Herzegovina	0–6	England
	Report	Oukriss 7'; Shooter 50', 89'; Peacock 72'; Anderson 74'; Hirons 76'

FA Training Centre, Zenica
Referee: Elisabet Calvo Valentín (Spain)

==== Group A6 ====
Pos	Team	Pld	W	D	L	GF	GA	GD	Pts	Transfer or relegation
1	Germany	0	0	0	0	0	0	0	0	Transfer to Round 2 League A
2	Netherlands (H)	0	0	0	0	0	0	0	0	Transfer to Round 2 League A
3	Norway	0	0	0	0	0	0	0	0	Transfer to Round 2 League A
4	Slovenia	0	0	0	0	0	0	0	0	Relegation to Round 2 League B

First match(es) will be played: 28 November 2026. Source: UEFA
Rules for classification: Tiebreakers
(H) Hosts
28 November 2026
14:00

Norway	v	Netherlands
	Report

Sportpark De Kranenhof, Escharen
28 November 2026
18:00

Germany	v	Slovenia
	Report

Sportpark Parkzicht, Uden

1 December 2026
14:00

Germany	v	Norway
	Report

Sportpark De Kranenhof, Escharen
1 December 2026
16:00

Netherlands	v	Slovenia
	Report

Sportpark Parkzicht, Uden

4 December 2026
14:00

Netherlands	v	Germany
	Report

Sportpark De Kranenhof, Escharen
4 December 2026
14:00

Slovenia	v	Norway
	Report

Sportpark Parkzicht, Uden

==== Group A7 ====
Pos	Team	Pld	W	D	L	GF	GA	GD	Pts	Transfer or relegation
1	Iceland	0	0	0	0	0	0	0	0	Transfer to Round 2 League A
2	France	0	0	0	0	0	0	0	0	Transfer to Round 2 League A
3	Belgium	0	0	0	0	0	0	0	0	Transfer to Round 2 League A
4	Croatia (H)	0	0	0	0	0	0	0	0	Relegation to Round 2 League B

First match(es) will be played: 28 November 2026. Source: UEFA
Rules for classification: Tiebreakers
(H) Hosts
28 November 2026
12:00

Iceland	v	Croatia
	Report

Stadion Branko Čavlović-Čavlek, Karlovac
28 November 2026
14:00

Belgium	v	France
	Report

Sport Centre Rudes, Zagreb

1 December 2026
12:00

France	v	Croatia
	Report

Stadion Branko Čavlović-Čavlek, Karlovac
1 December 2026
14:00

Iceland	v	Belgium
	Report

Sport Centre Rudes, Zagreb

4 December 2026
11:00

France	v	Iceland
	Report

Sport Centre Rudes, Zagreb
4 December 2026
11:00

Croatia	v	Belgium
	Report

Stadion Branko Čavlović-Čavlek, Karlovac

=== League B ===
Times are CET/CEST, as listed by UEFA (local times, if different, are in parentheses).

==== Group B1 ====
Pos	Team	Pld	W	D	L	GF	GA	GD	Pts	Promotion or transfer
1	Latvia	0	0	0	0	0	0	0	0	Promotion to Round 2 League A
2	Albania (H)	0	0	0	0	0	0	0	0	Transfer to Round 2 League B
3	Cyprus	0	0	0	0	0	0	0	0	Transfer to Round 2 League B
4	Moldova	0	0	0	0	0	0	0	0	Transfer to Round 2 League B

First match(es) will be played: 27 November 2026. Source: UEFA
Rules for classification: Tiebreakers
(H) Hosts
27 November 2026
12:00

Latvia	v	Moldova
	Report

Niko Dovana Stadium, Durrës
27 November 2026
14:00

Cyprus	v	Albania
	Report

House of Football Natural Pitch, Tirana

30 November 2026
12:00

Latvia	v	Cyprus
	Report

Egnatia, Rrogozhine
30 November 2026
14:00

Albania	v	Moldova
	Report

House of Football Natural Pitch, Tirana

3 December 2026
14:00

Albania	v	Latvia
	Report

House of Football Natural Pitch, Tirana
3 December 2026
14:00

Moldova	v	Cyprus
	Report

Egnatia, Rrogozhine

==== Group B2 ====
Pos	Team	Pld	W	D	L	GF	GA	GD	Pts	Promotion or transfer
1	Republic of Ireland	3	3	0	0	20	0	+20	9	Promotion to Round 2 League A
2	Georgia	3	2	0	1	8	7	+1	6	Transfer to Round 2 League B
3	Bulgaria (H)	3	1	0	2	10	3	+7	3	Transfer to Round 2 League B
4	Armenia	3	0	0	3	0	28	−28	0	Transfer to Round 2 League B

Source: UEFA
Rules for classification: Tiebreakers
(H) Hosts
7 October 2026
10:00

Georgia	1–0	Bulgaria
Buchukuri 57'	Report

Albena 1, Albena
Attendance: 27
Referee: Hanna Laajanen (Sweden)
7 October 2026
15:00

Republic of Ireland	11–0	Armenia
McGuane 3', 27'; Newell 18', 26'; Wollmer 20', 30'; Butler 38', 42', 50'; Finn 45'; Byrne 84'	Report

Albena 1, Albena
Referee: Farida Lutfaliyeva (Azerbaijan)

10 October 2026
10:00

Bulgaria	10–0	Armenia
Baliova 10', 12', 36'; Ravnachka 14', 31', 52', 87'; Raikova 62'; Desvaud 70'; Boneva 80'	Report

Albena 1, Albena
Referee: Hanna Laajanen (Sweden)
10 October 2026
15:00

Republic of Ireland	7–0	Georgia
Butler 8', 34'; Jones 26'; Kelly 36'; Breslin 49', 89'; Devoy 82'	Report

Albena 1, Albena
Referee: Anna Adamska (Poland)

13 October 2026
12:00

Bulgaria	0–2	Republic of Ireland
	Report	McGuane 47'; Butler 68'

Albena 1, Albena
Referee: Anna Adamska (Poland)
13 October 2026
12:00

Armenia	0–7	Georgia
	Report	Chkhetiani 5'; Tchurkveidze 31'; Gasanova 39'; Kaloiani 43' (pen.), 61'; Khelashvili 53' (pen.); Buchukuri 57'

Spartak, Varna
Referee: Farida Lutfaliyeva (Azerbaijan)

==== Group B3 ====
Pos	Team	Pld	W	D	L	GF	GA	GD	Pts	Promotion or transfer
1	Serbia (H)	0	0	0	0	0	0	0	0	Promotion to Round 2 League A
2	North Macedonia	0	0	0	0	0	0	0	0	Transfer to Round 2 League B
3	Montenegro	0	0	0	0	0	0	0	0	Transfer to Round 2 League B
4	Azerbaijan	0	0	0	0	0	0	0	0	Transfer to Round 2 League B

First match(es) will be played: 26 November 2026. Source: UEFA
Rules for classification: Tiebreakers
(H) Hosts
26 November 2026
11:00

Serbia	v	Azerbaijan
	Report

Serbian FA Sports Center, Stara Pazova
26 November 2026
14:00

Montenegro	v	North Macedonia
	Report

Serbian FA Sports Center, Stara Pazova

29 November 2026
11:00

North Macedonia	v	Azerbaijan
	Report

Serbian FA Sports Center, Stara Pazova
29 November 2026
14:00

Serbia	v	Montenegro
	Report

Serbian FA Sports Center, Stara Pazova

2 December 2026
13:00

North Macedonia	v	Serbia
	Report

Serbian FA Sports Center, Stara Pazova
2 December 2026
13:00

Azerbaijan	v	Montenegro
	Report

Serbian FA Sports Center, Stara Pazova

==== Group B4 ====
Pos	Team	Pld	W	D	L	GF	GA	GD	Pts	Promotion or transfer
1	Ukraine	0	0	0	0	0	0	0	0	Promotion to Round 2 League A
2	Faroe Islands (H)	0	0	0	0	0	0	0	0	Transfer to Round 2 League B
3	Lithuania	0	0	0	0	0	0	0	0	Transfer to Round 2 League B
4	Andorra	0	0	0	0	0	0	0	0	Transfer to Round 2 League B

First match(es) will be played: 24 November 2026. Source: UEFA
Rules for classification: Tiebreakers
(H) Hosts
24 November 2026
12:00

Ukraine	v	Andorra
	Report

Tórsvøllur, Tórshavn
24 November 2026
16:00

Lithuania	v	Faroe Islands
	Report

Tórsvøllur, Tórshavn

27 November 2026
12:00

Ukraine	v	Lithuania
	Report

Tórsvøllur, Tórshavn
27 November 2026
16:00

Faroe Islands	v	Andorra
	Report

Tórsvøllur, Tórshavn

30 November 2026
16:00

Faroe Islands	v	Ukraine
	Report

Tórsvøllur, Tórshavn
30 November 2026
16:00

Andorra	v	Lithuania
	Report

Toftir Stadium, Toftir

==== Group B5 ====
Pos	Team	Pld	W	D	L	GF	GA	GD	Pts	Promotion or transfer
1	Hungary (H)	0	0	0	0	0	0	0	0	Promotion to Round 2 League A
2	Estonia	0	0	0	0	0	0	0	0	Transfer to Round 2 League B
3	Luxembourg	0	0	0	0	0	0	0	0	Transfer to Round 2 League B
4	Liechtenstein	0	0	0	0	0	0	0	0	Transfer to Round 2 League B

First match(es) will be played: 29 November 2026. Source: UEFA
Rules for classification: Tiebreakers
(H) Hosts
29 November 2026
13:00

Luxembourg	v	Estonia
	Report

Globall Football Park, Telki
29 November 2026
16:00

Hungary	v	Liechtenstein
	Report

Globall Football Park, Telki

2 December 2026
13:00

Estonia	v	Liechtenstein
	Report

Globall Football Park, Telki
2 December 2026
16:00

Hungary	v	Luxembourg
	Report

Globall Football Park, Telki

5 December 2026
12:00

Estonia	v	Hungary
	Report

Globall Football Park, Telki
5 December 2026
12:00

Liechtenstein	v	Luxembourg
	Report

Globall Football Park, Telki

==== Group B6 ====
Pos	Team	Pld	W	D	L	GF	GA	GD	Pts	Promotion or transfer
1	Czech Republic	3	3	0	0	20	1	+19	9	Promotion to Round 2 League A
2	Romania	3	1	1	1	8	8	0	4	Transfer to Round 2 League B
3	Malta (H)	3	1	1	1	4	7	−3	4	Transfer to Round 2 League B
4	Kazakhstan	3	0	0	3	2	18	−16	0	Transfer to Round 2 League B

Source: UEFA
Rules for classification: Tiebreakers
(H) Hosts
6 October 2026
11:00

Romania	6–1	Kazakhstan
Colibaba 3', 63'; Olah 14'; Bucșa 57'; Bogos 76'; Glatter 84'	Report	Oster 90+2'

Centenary Stadium, Ta' Qali
Attendance: 8
Referee: Melek Dakan (Turkey)
6 October 2026
14:30

Malta	0–5	Czech Republic
	Report	Pešková 25'; Juřeníková 34', 65'; Eiseltová 43'; Daníčková 56'

Centenary Stadium, Ta' Qali
Attendance: 98
Referee: Eirini Pingiou (Greece)

9 October 2026
11:00

Czech Republic	9–0	Kazakhstan
Rancová 38', 60' (pen.); Juřeníková 41'; Balázsová 49', 55', 73', 77'; Daníčková 51'; Pávková 57'	Report

Centenary Stadium, Ta' Qali
Referee: Eirini Pingiou (Greece)
9 October 2026
14:30

Romania	1–1	Malta
Olah 56'	Report	Ganado 88'

Centenary Stadium, Ta' Qali
Referee: Melissa Burgin (England)

12 October 2026
12:30

Czech Republic	6–1	Romania
Balázsová 21', 45'; Daníčková 25'; Juřeníková 45+2'; Eiseltová 53'; Pešková 76'	Report	Olah 40'

National Stadium, Ta' Qali
Referee: Melissa Burgin (England)
12 October 2026
12:30

Kazakhstan	1–3	Malta
Oster 6'	Report	Catania 40'; Ganado 52', 58'

Centenary Stadium, Ta' Qali
Referee: Melek Dakan (Turkey)

==== Ranking of second-placed teams ====
To determine the best runner-up team, all the results of the runner-up teams against the first-, third-, and fourth-placed teams in their group are taken into account, because each group has the same number of teams(Regulations Article 18.01).

Pos	Grp	Team	Pld	W	D	L	GF	GA	GD	Pts	Promotion
1	B2	Georgia	3	2	0	1	8	7	+1	6	Promoted to Round 2 League A
2	B6	Romania	3	1	1	1	8	8	0	4	
3	B1	Runner-up Group B1	0	0	0	0	0	0	0	0	
4	B3	Runner-up Group B3	0	0	0	0	0	0	0	0	
5	B4	Runner-up Group B4	0	0	0	0	0	0	0	0	
6	B5	Runner-up Group B5	0	0	0	0	0	0	0	0	

Updated to match(es) played on 13 October 2026. Source: UEFA
Rules for classification: 1) points; 2) goal difference; 3) goals scored; 4) disciplinary points; 5) position in the applicable rankings.

== Round 2 ==
=== Draw ===
The draw for the Round 2 will be held in December 2026 at the UEFA headquarters in Nyon, Switzerland.

The 50 participating teams will be split into two Leagues (28 in League A, 22 in League B) according to their final group standings of Round 1 (Regulations Article 15.01).

Within each League, the teams will be allocated to four drawing pots (seven teams per pot in League A; six teams in Pots 1 to 3 and three teams in Pot 4 in League B). Teams in the same pot would be drawn into different groups, with League A consisting of seven groups of four teams, and League B consisting of three groups of four and three groups of three teams.

Teams entering League A

The 21 teams of Round 1 League A (top three teams in each group) and the seven teams of Round 1 League B (six group winners and the best runner-up) will be drawn into seven groups of four teams. The Round 1 League A group winners are automatically seeded into Pot 1, the second- and third-placed teams into Pots 2 and 3, respectively. The Round 1 League B teams are seeded into Pot 4; their matches against the fourth-placed teams in their group did not count towards this ranking (Regulations Article 15.01).

Pos	Gr (Rk)	Team	Pld	W	D	L	GF	GA	GD	Pts	Seeding
1	A5 (1)	Denmark	3	3	0	0	15	4	+11	9	Pot 1
2	A1 (1)	1st Group A1	0	0	0	0	0	0	0	0	Pot 1
3	A2 (1)	1st Group A2	0	0	0	0	0	0	0	0	Pot 1
4	A3 (1)	1st Group A3	0	0	0	0	0	0	0	0	Pot 1
5	A4 (1)	1st Group A4	0	0	0	0	0	0	0	0	Pot 1
6	A6 (1)	1st Group A6	0	0	0	0	0	0	0	0	Pot 1
7	A7 (1)	1st Group A7	0	0	0	0	0	0	0	0	Pot 1
8	A5 (2)	England	3	1	1	1	9	7	+2	4	Pot 2
9	A1 (2)	2nd Group A1	0	0	0	0	0	0	0	0	Pot 2
10	A2 (2)	2nd Group A2	0	0	0	0	0	0	0	0	Pot 2
11	A3 (2)	2nd Group A3	0	0	0	0	0	0	0	0	Pot 2
12	A4 (2)	2nd Group A4	0	0	0	0	0	0	0	0	Pot 2
13	A6 (2)	2nd Group A6	0	0	0	0	0	0	0	0	Pot 2
14	A7 (2)	2nd Group A7	0	0	0	0	0	0	0	0	Pot 2
15	A5 (3)	Switzerland	3	1	1	1	6	9	−3	4	Pot 3
16	A1 (3)	3rd Group A1	0	0	0	0	0	0	0	0	Pot 3
17	A2 (3)	3rd Group A2	0	0	0	0	0	0	0	0	Pot 3
18	A3 (3)	3rd Group A3	0	0	0	0	0	0	0	0	Pot 3
19	A4 (3)	3rd Group A4	0	0	0	0	0	0	0	0	Pot 3
20	A6 (3)	3rd Group A6	0	0	0	0	0	0	0	0	Pot 3
21	A7 (3)	3rd Group A7	0	0	0	0	0	0	0	0	Pot 3
22	B2 (1)	Republic of Ireland	3	3	0	0	20	0	+20	9	Pot 4
23	B6 (1)	Czech Republic	3	3	0	0	20	1	+19	9	Pot 4
24	B1 (1)	1st Group B1	0	0	0	0	0	0	0	0	Pot 4
25	B3 (1)	1st Group B3	0	0	0	0	0	0	0	0	Pot 4
26	B4 (1)	1st Group B4	0	0	0	0	0	0	0	0	Pot 4
27	B5 (1)	1st Group B5	0	0	0	0	0	0	0	0	Pot 4
28	B0 (2)	Best Runner-up League B	0	0	0	0	0	0	0	0	Pot 4

Updated to match(es) played on 13 October 2026. Source: UEFA
Rules for classification: 1) round 1 position; 2) points; 3) goal difference; 4) goals scored; 5) disciplinary points; 6) position in the applicable rankings.

Teams entering League B

The seven fourth-placed teams of Round 1 League A and the 14 non-promoted teams of Round 1 League B will be drawn into six groups of three or four teams. The best six fourth-placed teams of Round 1 League A will be automatically seeded into Pot 1. The seventh fourth-placed team of Round 1 League A and the runner-up teams of Round 1 League B will be seeded into Pot 2. The third- and fourth-placed teams of Round 1 League B will be seeded into Pots 3 and 4, respectively. The matches of the second- and third-placed teams of Round 1 League B against the fourth-placed teams in their group did not count towards this ranking (Regulations Article 15.01).

Pos	Gr (Rk)	Team	Pld	W	D	L	GF	GA	GD	Pts	Seeding
1	A5 (4)	Bosnia and Herzegovina	3	0	0	3	2	12	−10	0	Pot 1
2	A1 (4)	4th Group A1	0	0	0	0	0	0	0	0	Pot 1
3	A2 (4)	4th Group A2	0	0	0	0	0	0	0	0	Pot 1
4	A3 (4)	4th Group A3	0	0	0	0	0	0	0	0	Pot 1
5	A4 (4)	4th Group A4	0	0	0	0	0	0	0	0	Pot 1
6	A6 (4)	4th Group A6	0	0	0	0	0	0	0	0	Pot 1
7	A7 (4)	4th Group A7	0	0	0	0	0	0	0	0	Pot 2
8	B6 (2)	Romania	3	1	1	1	8	8	0	4	Pot 2
9	B2 (2)	2nd Group B2	0	0	0	0	0	0	0	0	Pot 2
10	B3 (2)	2nd Group B3	0	0	0	0	0	0	0	0	Pot 2
11	B4 (2)	2nd Group B4	0	0	0	0	0	0	0	0	Pot 2
12	B5 (2)	2nd Group B5	0	0	0	0	0	0	0	0	Pot 2
13	B6 (3)	Malta	3	1	1	1	4	7	−3	4	Pot 3
14	B2 (3)	Bulgaria	3	1	0	2	10	3	+7	3	Pot 3
15	B1 (3)	3rd Group B1	0	0	0	0	0	0	0	0	Pot 3
16	B3 (3)	3rd Group B3	0	0	0	0	0	0	0	0	Pot 3
17	B4 (3)	3rd Group B4	0	0	0	0	0	0	0	0	Pot 3
18	B5 (3)	3rd Group B5	0	0	0	0	0	0	0	0	Pot 3
19	B6 (4)	Kazakhstan	3	0	0	3	2	18	−16	0	Pot 4
20	B2 (4)	Armenia	3	0	0	3	0	28	−28	0	Pot 4
21	B1 (4)	4th Group B1	0	0	0	0	0	0	0	0	Pot 4
22	B3 (4)	4th Group B3	0	0	0	0	0	0	0	0	Pot 4
23	B4 (4)	4th Group B4	0	0	0	0	0	0	0	0	Pot 4
24	B5 (4)	4th Group B5	0	0	0	0	0	0	0	0	Pot 4

Updated to match(es) played on 13 October 2026. Source: UEFA
Rules for classification: 1) round 1 position; 2) points; 3) goal difference; 4) goals scored; 5) disciplinary points; 6) position in the applicable rankings.

== Goalscorers ==
In Round 1, there were 104 goals scored in 18 matches, for an average of 5.78 goals per match (as of 13 October 2026).

6 goals

- (Czech Republic) Stella Balázsová
- (Denmark) Mila Bischoff
- (Republic of Ireland) Anna Butler

4 goals

- (Bulgaria) Katerina-Maria Ravnachka
- (Czech Republic) Ema Juřeníková
- (Denmark) Frederikke Ludvigsen
- (England) Lois Shooter

3 goals

- (Bulgaria) Monika Baliova
- (Czech Republic) Klára Daníčková
- (Malta) Crista Chetcuti Ganado
- (Republic of Ireland) Madison McGuane

2 goals

- (Czech Republic) Ellen Eiseltová
- (Czech Republic) Natálie Pešková
- (Czech Republic) Denisa Rancová
- (Denmark) Nikoline Nielsen
- (Georgia (country)) Anastasia Buchukuri
- (Georgia (country)) Lolita Kaloiani
- (Kazakhstan) Angelina Oster
- (Republic of Ireland) Ciara Breslin
- (Republic of Ireland) Finley Newell
- (Republic of Ireland) Maeve Wollmer
- (Romania) Corina Colibaba
- (Romania) Maria Isabel Olah
- (Switzerland) Olivia Edelmann

1 goal

- (Bosnia and Herzegovina) Velida Aličković
- (Bosnia and Herzegovina) Sara Mujdžić
- (Bulgaria) Raya Boneva
- (Bulgaria) Elisa Desvaud
- (Bulgaria) Aleksandra Raikova
- (Czech Republic) Jolana Pávková
- (Denmark) Asta Kynde
- (Denmark) Thea Petersen
- (Denmark) Andrea Thierry
- (England) Jessica Anderson
- (England) Freya Hirons
- (England) Rania Oukriss
- (England) Niamh Peacock
- (England) Kyri Teer-Hutchins
- (Georgia (country)) Niniko Chkhetiani
- (Georgia (country)) Mariam Gasanova
- (Georgia (country)) Sophie Khelashvili
- (Georgia (country)) Ketevan Tchurkveidze
- (Malta) Amy Bello Catania
- (Republic of Ireland) Sophie Byrne
- (Republic of Ireland) Alex Devoy
- (Republic of Ireland) Tess Finn
- (Republic of Ireland) Kate Jones
- (Republic of Ireland) Ella Kelly
- (Romania) Violeta Bogos
- (Romania) Aida Bucșa
- (Romania) Sophia Daniela Glatter
- (Switzerland) Jasmin Bornemann
- (Switzerland) Laura Kott
- (Switzerland) Giulia Looser
- (Switzerland) Tiffany Vonnez
