= Nikoline Nielsen (footballer) =

Danish footballer (born 2009)

Personal information
- Full name: Nikoline Lilly Nielsen
- Date of birth: 12 August 2009 (age 17)
- Position: Forward

Team information
- Current team: Barcelona B

Senior career*
| Years | Team | Apps | (Gls) |
| 2025–2026 | Fortuna Hjørring | 14 | (1) |
| 2026– | Barcelona B | | |

International career^{‡}
| 2024–2025 | Denmark U16 | 11 | (6) |
| 2025– | Denmark U17 | 11 | (6) |
| 2025– | Denmark U19 | 6 | (2) |
- * Club domestic league appearances and goals as of 22 November 2025 ‡ National team caps and goals as of 15 April 2026

Nikoline Lilly Nielsen (born 12 August 2009) is a Danish footballer who plays as a forward for Primera Federación club Barcelona B.

== Club career ==
Nielsen made her debut for Fortuna Hjørring on 24 May 2025, making an assist to Joy Omewa in a 1–0 win over AGF. Later that year, on 27 August, she scored her first goal for the club against Hibernian in UEFA Women's Champions League qualifying, scoring directly from a corner kick in stoppage time to secure a 2–1 victory.

On 19 February 2026, it was announced that Nielsen would join Barcelona B on a free transfer following the conclusion of the 2026–27 season.

== Honours ==
Fortuna Hjørring

- A-Liga: 2024–25
