= 2027 UEFA Women's Under-19 Championship =

2027-es U19-es női labdarúgó-Európa-bajnokság

Tournament details
- Host country: Hungary
- Dates: TBD
- Teams: 8 (from 1 confederation)

Tournament statistics
- Matches played: 15

The 2027 UEFA Women's Under-19 Championship will be the 24th edition of the UEFA Women's Under-19 Championship, the annual international youth football championship organised by UEFA for the women's under-19 national teams of Europe. Hungary will host the tournament.

A total of eight teams are playing in the tournament, with players born on or after 1 January 2008 eligible to participate.

Similar to the previous editions held in odd-numbered years, the tournament acted as the UEFA qualifiers for the FIFA U-20 Women's World Cup. The top five teams of the tournament would qualify for the 2028 FIFA U-20 Women's World Cup.

== Qualification ==
52 (out of 55) UEFA nations entered the qualifying competition, with the hosts Hungary also competing despite already qualifying automatically, and seven teams would qualify for the final tournament at the end of round 2 to join the hosts.

== Qualified teams ==
Seven teams will qualify for the final tournament along with hosts Hungary.

Team	Qualified as	Qualified on	Previous appearances in Under-19 Euro^{1} only U-19 era (since 2002)
Hungary	Hosts	26 September 2023	1 (2005)
	Round 2 Group A1 winners		
	Round 2 Group A2 winners		
	Round 2 Group A3 winners		
	Round 2 Group A4 winners		
	Round 2 Group A5 winners		
	Round 2 Group A6 winners		
	Round 2 Group A7 winners		

^{1} Bold indicates champions for that year. Italic indicates hosts for that year.
