= Serbian FA Sports Center =

Sports complex in Stara Pazova

- House of Football; Кућа фудбала
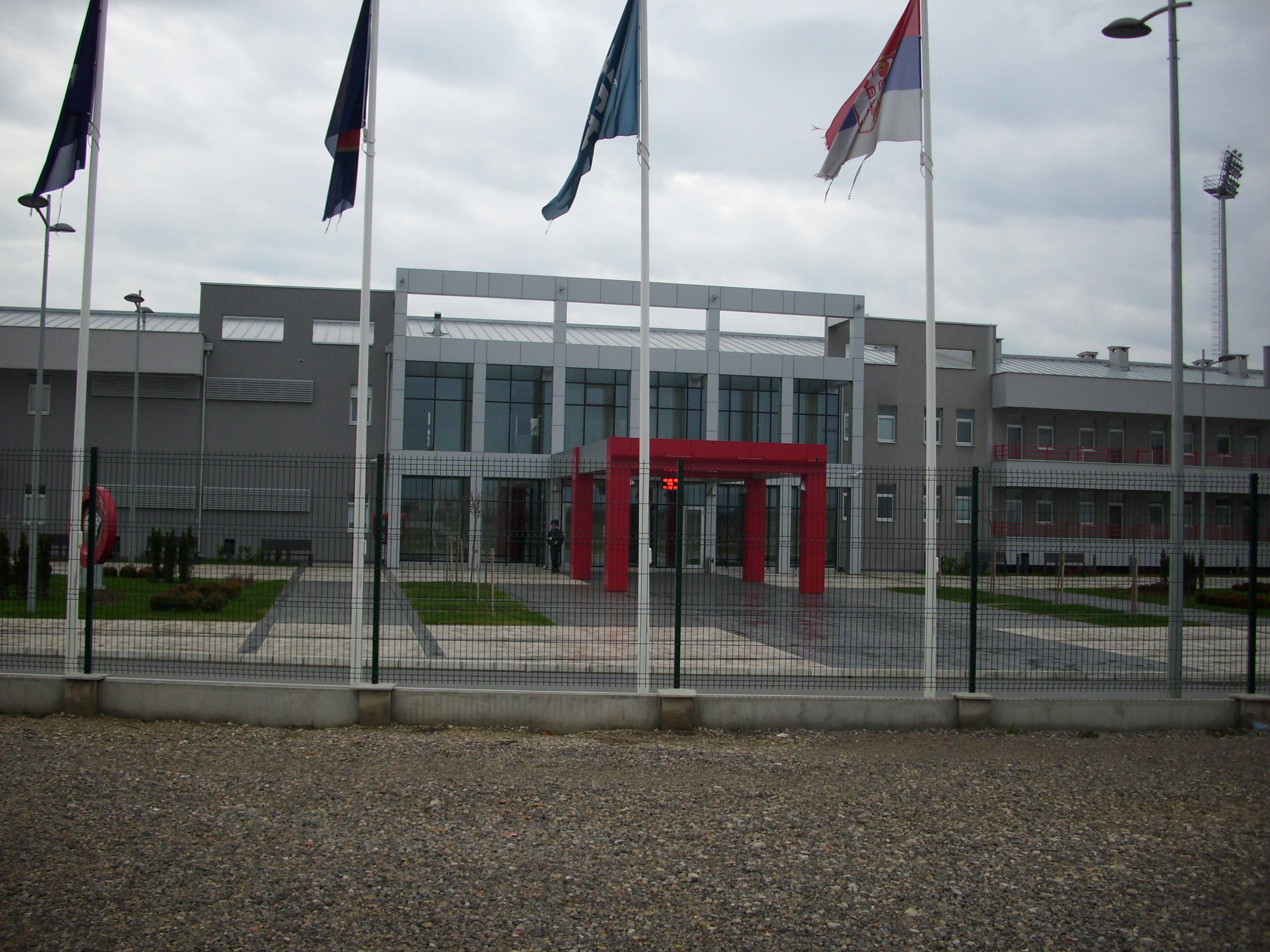
- The stadium from front

- Location within Vojvodina
- Full name: Sports Centre of the Football Association of Serbia
- Location: Stara Pazova, Vojvodina, Serbia
- Coordinates: 44°59′06.9″N 20°18′59.4″E
- Owner: FSS
- Operator: FSS
- Capacity: 3,000 (football)
- Type: UEFA Category 3 Stadium
- Surface: grass
- Field size: 105 m × 68 m (344 ft × 223 ft)

Construction
- Built: 2009
- Opened: 2011

Tenants
- Serbia national football team Serbia women's national football team OFK Beograd (2025–present)

House of Football (Serbian: Кућа фудбала, Kuća fudbala) is a modern sports complex of the Football Association of Serbia in Stara Pazova. The complex was opened on May 14, 2011. Complex in Stara Pazova was built with the support of the Ministry of Youth and Sports of the Republic of Serbia, the World Football Federation (FIFA) and the European Football Federation (UEFA). The local self-government of the municipality of Stara Pazova also contributed to the realization of this big project of the Football Association of Serbia.

The total price of the building was 15 million euros. The complex has a total area of 11.5 hectares, which includes 10,000 -{m^{2}}- of closed space and 60,000 -{m^{2}}- of open grounds. In addition to football fields, the complex has an athletic track, a hotel, a restaurant and a gym.

The opening of the complex was attended by FIFA president Sepp Blatter, UEFA president Michel Platini, FSS president Tomislav Karadžić and the presidents of the football associations of Montenegro and Croatia Dejan Savićević and Vlatko Marković.

== Stadium ==
A stadium with a capacity of 3,000 seats. Within the stadium there are also 7 dressing rooms, two VIP lounges, a Media conference center and a media lounge. The ground of the stadium is illuminated with Philips floodlights of 1400 lux. The stadium meets all the FIFA conditions required for official matches.
