= 2025 UEFA Women's Under-19 Championship qualification =

Tournament details
- Dates: Round 1: 26 November – 3 December 2024; Round 2: 18 February – 8 April 2025
- Teams: 51 (from 1 confederation)

Tournament statistics
- Matches played: 150
- Goals scored: 541 (3.61 per match)
- Top scorer(s): (Belarus) Anastasiya Kavaliova (8 goals)

The 2025 UEFA Women's Under-19 Championship qualification was an under-19 women's national football team competition that determined the seven teams that would join the automatically qualified host team Poland in the 2025 UEFA Women's Under-19 Championship final tournament.

Three national teams decided not to participate in the event and Russia were excluded from the tournament due to the ongoing invasion of Ukraine. Therefore, including hosts Poland, 51 teams entered this qualifying competition. The Round 1 of the qualification was played from 26 November to 3 December 2024, while the Round 2 was played from 18 February to 8 April 2025. Players born on or after 1 January 2006 were eligible to participate.

== Format ==
The qualification consisted of two rounds, both with teams playing in two tiered leagues. Each round league consisted of several groups, which were played as single-round-robin mini-tournaments, with one team from each group selected as the host after the draw.

- Round 1:
  - League A: 28 teams were drawn into seven groups of four. The top three teams from each group were transferred to Round 2 League A; teams that finished fourth were relegated to Round 2 League B.
  - League B: 23 teams were drawn into six groups of three or four. The group winners and the best runner-up team were promoted to Round 2 League A; the other teams were transferred to Round 2 League B.
- Round 2:
  - League A: 28 teams were drawn into seven groups of four. The group winners qualified for the final tournament. Since Poland, as the host of the final tournament, won one of these groups, the best runner-up team also qualified. Teams that finished fourth were relegated to Round 1 League B for the next season.
  - League B: 23 teams were drawn into six groups of three or four. The group winners and the best runner-up team were promoted to Round 1 League A for the next season.

=== Tiebreakers ===
In a group, teams are ranked according to points (3 points for a win, 1 point for a draw, 0 points for a loss), and if tied on points, the following tiebreaking criteria are applied, in the order given, to determine the rankings (Regulations Articles 17.01 and 17.02):

1. Points in head-to-head matches among tied teams;
2. Goal difference in head-to-head matches among tied teams;
3. Goals scored in head-to-head matches among tied teams;
4. If more than two teams are tied, and after applying all head-to-head criteria above, a subset of teams are still tied, all head-to-head criteria above are reapplied exclusively to this subset of teams;
5. Goal difference in all group matches;
6. Goals scored in all group matches;
7. Penalty shoot-out if only two teams have the same number of points, and they met in the last round of the group and are tied after applying all criteria above (not used if more than two teams have the same number of points, or if their rankings are not relevant for qualification for the next stage);
8. Disciplinary points (red card = 3 points, yellow card = 1 point, expulsion for two yellow cards in one match = 3 points);
9. Position in the applicable ranking:
  1. for teams in Round 1, position in the 2023–24 Round 2 league rankings;
  2. for teams in Round 2, position in the Round 1 league ranking.

To determine the best runner-up team in League B, the results against the teams in fourth place are discarded and the following criteria are applied (Regulations Articles 18.01 and 18.03):

1. Points;
2. Goal difference;
3. Goals scored;
4. Disciplinary points;
5. Position in the applicable ranking:
  1. for teams in Round 1, position in the 2023–24 Round 2 league rankings;
  2. for teams in Round 2, position in the Round 1 league rankings.

== Round 1 ==
=== Draw ===
The draw for the Round 1 was held on 7 June 2024, at the UEFA headquarters in Nyon, Switzerland.

The 51 participating teams were split into two Leagues (28 in League A, 23 in League B) according to their final group standings of Round 2 of the 2023–24 competition (Regulations Article 13.01). To determine this ranking, the following criteria were followed:

1. higher position in the following classification:
  1. Round 2 League A group winners
  2. Round 2 League A group runners-up
  3. Round 2 League A third-placed teams
  4. Teams promoted from Round 2 League B
  5. Teams relegated from Round 2 League A
  6. Round 2 League B runners-up
  7. Round 2 League B third-placed teams
  8. Round 2 League B fourth-placed teams
2. higher number of points in all mini-tournament matches;
3. superior goal difference in all mini-tournament matches;
4. higher number of goals scored in all mini-tournament matches;
5. lower disciplinary points (red card = 3 points, yellow card = 1 point, expulsion for two yellow cards in one match = 3 points);
6. higher position in the 2023–24 Round 1 league rankings.

Within each League, the teams were allocated to four drawing pots (seven teams per pot in League A, six teams in Pots 1 to 3 and five teams in Pot 4 in League B). Teams in the same pot would be drawn into different groups, with League A consisting of seven groups of four teams, and League B consisting of five groups of four and one group of three teams.

As decided by the UEFA Executive Committee and the UEFA Emergency Panel, the following pairs of teams could not be drawn into the same group: Serbia and Kosovo (League A), Armenia and Azerbaijan (League B).

Teams entering League A

The 21 teams of the previous season's Round 2 League A (top three teams in each group) and the seven teams of Round 2 League B (six group winners and the best runner-up) were drawn into seven groups of four teams. The Round 2 League A group winners were automatically seeded into Pot 1, the second- and third-placed teams into Pots 2 and 3, respectively. The previous season's Round 2 League B teams were seeded into Pot 4; their matches against the fourth-placed teams in their group did not count towards this ranking (Regulations Article 13.02).

Pos	Gr (Rk)	Team	Pld	W	D	L	GF	GA	GD	Pts	Seeding
1	A6 (1)	Netherlands	3	3	0	0	15	1	+14	9	Pot 1
2	A1 (1)	Spain	3	3	0	0	14	0	+14	9	Pot 1
3	A7 (1)	Germany	3	3	0	0	12	1	+11	9	Pot 1
4	A4 (1)	France	3	3	0	0	8	0	+8	9	Pot 1
5	A2 (1)	Republic of Ireland	3	3	0	0	8	1	+7	9	Pot 1
6	A3 (1)	England	3	3	0	0	7	1	+6	9	Pot 1
7	A5 (1)	Serbia	3	2	1	0	11	2	+9	7	Pot 1
8	A4 (2)	Norway	3	2	0	1	9	1	+8	6	Pot 2
9	A2 (2)	Austria	3	2	0	1	11	4	+7	6	Pot 2
10	A6 (2)	Poland	3	2	0	1	7	3	+4	6	Pot 2
11	A5 (2)	Belgium	3	2	0	1	5	2	+3	6	Pot 2
12	A7 (2)	Sweden	3	1	1	1	4	4	0	4	Pot 2
13	A3 (2)	Portugal	3	1	1	1	1	1	0	4	Pot 2
14	A1 (2)	Denmark	3	1	1	1	3	4	−1	4	Pot 2
15	A5 (3)	Slovakia	3	1	1	1	4	5	−1	4	Pot 3
16	A1 (3)	Greece	3	1	1	1	4	9	−5	4	Pot 3
17	A2 (3)	Iceland	3	1	0	2	6	8	−2	3	Pot 3
18	A7 (3)	Hungary	3	1	0	2	3	10	−7	3	Pot 3
19	A4 (3)	Czech Republic	3	1	0	2	1	9	−8	3	Pot 3
20	A3 (3)	Italy	3	0	2	1	1	4	−3	2	Pot 3
21	A6 (3)	Finland	3	0	1	2	2	4	−2	1	Pot 3
22	B3 (1)	Kosovo	2	2	0	0	6	1	+5	6	Pot 4
23	B2 (1)	Scotland	2	2	0	0	5	0	+5	6	Pot 4
24	B4 (1)	Bulgaria	2	2	0	0	6	2	+4	6	Pot 4
25	B1 (1)	North Macedonia	2	2	0	0	4	1	+3	6	Pot 4
26	B6 (1)	Turkey	2	1	1	0	8	1	+7	4	Pot 4
27	B5 (1)	Northern Ireland	2	1	1	0	2	0	+2	4	Pot 4
28	B6 (2)	Faroe Islands	2	1	1	0	4	2	+2	4	Pot 4

Source: UEFA
Rules for classification: 1) round 1 position; 2) points; 3) goal difference; 4) goals scored; 5) disciplinary points; 6) position in the applicable rankings.

Teams entering League B

The seven fourth-placed teams of the previous season's Round 2 League A and the 16 non-promoted teams of Round 2 League B were drawn into six groups of three or four teams. The best six fourth-placed teams of Round 2 League A were automatically seeded into Pot 1. The seventh fourth-placed team of Round 2 League A and the runner-up teams of Round 2 League B were seeded into Pot 2. The third- and fourth-placed teams of the previous season's Round 2 League B were seeded into Pots 3 and 4, respectively. The matches of the second- and third-placed teams of Round 2 League B against the fourth-placed teams in their group did not count towards this ranking (Regulations Article 13.02).

Pos	Gr (Rk)	Team	Pld	W	D	L	GF	GA	GD	Pts	Seeding
1	A3 (4)	Switzerland	3	0	1	2	0	3	−3	1	Pot 1
2	A7 (4)	Romania	3	0	1	2	1	5	−4	1	Pot 1
3	A6 (4)	Bosnia and Herzegovina	3	0	1	2	1	17	−16	1	Pot 1
4=	A1 (4)	Slovenia	3	0	0	3	0	8	−8	0	Pot 1
4=	A4 (4)	Ukraine	3	0	0	3	0	8	−8	0	Pot 1
6	A5 (4)	Belarus	3	0	0	3	1	12	−11	0	Pot 1
7	A2 (4)	Croatia	3	0	0	3	2	14	−12	0	Pot 2
8	B4 (2)	Latvia	2	1	0	1	6	5	+1	3	Pot 2
9	B1 (2)	Wales	2	1	0	1	3	2	+1	3	Pot 2
10	B2 (2)	Albania	2	1	0	1	3	3	0	3	Pot 2
11	B3 (2)	Israel	2	1	0	1	2	2	0	3	Pot 2
12	B5 (2)	Estonia	2	1	0	1	2	3	−1	3	Pot 2
13	B5 (3)	Kazakhstan	2	0	1	1	1	2	−1	1	Pot 3
14	B1 (3)	Lithuania	2	0	0	2	0	4	−4	0	Pot 3
15	B4 (3)	Montenegro	2	0	0	2	2	7	−5	0	Pot 3
16=	B2 (3)	Cyprus	2	0	0	2	0	5	−5	0	Pot 3
16=	B3 (3)	Luxembourg	2	0	0	2	0	5	−5	0	Pot 3
18	B6 (3)	Armenia	2	0	0	2	1	10	−9	0	Pot 3
19=	B4 (4)	Azerbaijan	3	0	0	3	0	9	−9	0	Pot 4
19=	B1 (4)	Moldova	3	0	0	3	0	9	−9	0	Pot 4
21	B5 (4)	Georgia	3	0	0	3	2	13	−11	0	Pot 4
22	B2 (4)	Liechtenstein	3	0	0	3	0	22	−22	0	Pot 4
23	New entry	Malta	—	—	—	—	—	—	—	0	Pot 4

Source: UEFA
Rules for classification: 1) round 1 position; 2) points; 3) goal difference; 4) goals scored; 5) disciplinary points; 6) position in the applicable rankings.

Did not enter

- Andorra
- Gibraltar
- San Marino

Banned

- Russia

=== League A ===
Times are CET (UTC+1) as listed by UEFA (local times, if different, are in parentheses).

==== Group A1 ====
Pos	Team	Pld	W	D	L	GF	GA	GD	Pts	Transfer or relegation
1	Germany (H)	3	3	0	0	13	1	+12	9	Transferred to Round 2 League A
2	Denmark	3	2	0	1	5	5	0	6	Transferred to Round 2 League A
3	Greece	3	1	0	2	2	5	−3	3	Transferred to Round 2 League A
4	Kosovo	3	0	0	3	0	9	−9	0	Relegated to Round 2 League B

Source: www.sofascore.com
Rules for classification: Tiebreakers
(H) Hosts
27 November 2024
11:00

Greece	0–2	Denmark
	Report	Aagaard 7'; Vestermark 31'

Leichtathletikstadion, Duisburg
Referee: Ainara Acevedo (Spain)
27 November 2024
14:30

Germany	5–0	Kosovo
Gonzalez 18'; Portella 26'; Schneider 67', 90+4'; Schetter 89'	Report

Sportschule Wedau, Duisburg
Referee: Réka Molnar (Hungary)

30 November 2024
11:00

Denmark	2–0	Kosovo
Hoxha 33' (o.g.); Vestermark 90+1'	Report

Leichtathletikstadion, Duisburg
Referee: Ainara Acevedo (Spain)
30 November 2024
14:30

Germany	3–0	Greece
Krüger 22', 50'; Rückert 80'	Report

Sportschule Wedau, Duisburg
Referee: Michaela Pachtova (Czech Republic)

3 December 2024
14:30

Denmark	1–5	Germany
Valvik 51'	Report	Gonzalez 7', 39'; Scholz 24'; Krüger 32'; Boboy 53' (pen.)

Sportschule Wedau, Duisburg
Referee: Michaela Pachtova (Czech Republic)
3 December 2024
14:30

Kosovo	0–2	Greece
	Report	Platania 76'; Fakinou 90+1'

Leichtathletikstadion, Duisburg
Referee: Réka Molnar (Hungary)

==== Group A2 ====
Pos	Team	Pld	W	D	L	GF	GA	GD	Pts	Transfer or relegation
1	France	3	3	0	0	16	0	+16	9	Transferred to Round 2 League A
2	Portugal (H)	3	2	0	1	5	4	+1	6	Transferred to Round 2 League A
3	Slovakia	3	1	0	2	4	10	−6	3	Transferred to Round 2 League A
4	North Macedonia	3	0	0	3	0	11	−11	0	Relegated to Round 2 League B

Source: www.sofascore.com
Rules for classification: Tiebreakers
(H) Hosts
27 November 2024
16:00

France	4–0	North Macedonia
Sierra 5'; Swierot 43'; Mé. Mendy 59' (pen.); Ma. Mendy 76'	Report

Estádio Municipal da Bela Vista, Parchal
Referee: Deborah Bianchi (Italy)
27 November 2024
18:00

Slovakia	0–2	Portugal
	Report	Martins 60'; Gunišová 76' (o.g.)

Estádio Algarve, Loulé
Referee: Andromachi Tsiofliki (Greece)

30 November 2024
14:00

France	8–0	Slovakia
Effa 22'; Joseph 30', 60'; Swierot 39'; Ma. Mendy 41', 57'; Traoré 44'; Bacoul-Juillard 71'	Report

Estádio Municipal da Bela Vista, Parchal
Referee: Minka Vekkeli (Finland)
30 November 2024
16:00

Portugal	3–0	North Macedonia
Costa 35'; Kaminska 38'; Santiago 45+6'	Report

Estádio Algarve, Loulé
Referee: Andromachi Tsiofliki (Greece)

3 December 2024
17:00

Portugal	0–4	France
	Report	Joseph 45+1'; Traoré 65'; Rouquet 71'; Effa 77'

Estádio Municipal da Bela Vista, Parchal
Referee: Minka Vekkeli (Finland)
3 December 2024
17:00

North Macedonia	0–4	Slovakia
	Report	Horváthová 8'; Straková 18', 31'; Sluková 20'

Estádio Algarve, Loulé
Referee: Deborah Bianchi (Italy)

==== Group A3 ====
Pos	Team	Pld	W	D	L	GF	GA	GD	Pts	Transfer or relegation
1	Norway	3	3	0	0	6	0	+6	9	Transferred to Round 2 League A
2	Republic of Ireland	3	2	0	1	5	2	+3	6	Transferred to Round 2 League A
3	Finland	3	1	0	2	5	4	+1	3	Transferred to Round 2 League A
4	Bulgaria (H)	3	0	0	3	0	10	−10	0	Relegated to Round 2 League B

Source: www.sofascore.com
Rules for classification: Tiebreakers
(H) Hosts
27 November 2024
10:00

Finland	0–1	Norway
	Report	Kerim-Lindland 19'

Albena 1, Albena
Referee: Katalin Sipos (Hungary)
27 November 2024
13:30

Republic of Ireland	2–0	Bulgaria
Healy 43'; Sena 90+3'	Report

Albena 1, Albena
Referee: Rasa Grigonė (Lithuania)

30 November 2024
10:00

Republic of Ireland	3–1	Finland
O'Leary 36'; Sena 42', 77'	Report	Ulenius 18'

Albena 1, Albena
Referee: Merima Čelik (Bosnia and Herzegovina)
30 November 2024
13:30

Norway	4–0	Bulgaria
Alfredsen 19'; Pettersen 21'; Buberg 50'; Ludvigsen 72'	Report

Albena 1, Albena
Referee: Katalin Sipos (Hungary)

3 December 2024
13:00

Norway	1–0	Republic of Ireland
Alfredsen 11'	Report

Stadion Druzhba, Dobrich
Referee: Merima Čelik (Bosnia and Herzegovina)
3 December 2024
13:00

Bulgaria	0–4	Finland
	Report	Ulenius 8', 53'; Råtts 9', 44'

Albena 1, Albena
Referee: Rasa Grigonė (Lithuania)

==== Group A4 ====
Pos	Team	Pld	W	D	L	GF	GA	GD	Pts	Transfer or relegation
1	Italy	3	2	0	1	12	2	+10	6 (Note: Head-to-head results: Italy 2–1 Poland, England 1–0 Italy, Poland 1–0 England. Head-to-head standings: Italy: 3 pts, 0 GD (2 GF, 2 GA); Poland: 3 pts, 0 GD (2 GF, 2 GA); England: 3 pts, 0 GD (1 GF, 1 GA); Italy and Poland ranked on overall goal difference: Italy: +10, Poland: +8)	Transferred to Round 2 League A
2	Poland (H)	3	2	0	1	10	2	+8	6	Transferred to Round 2 League A
3	England	3	2	0	1	3	2	+1	6	Transferred to Round 2 League A
4	Turkey	3	0	0	3	1	20	−19	0	Relegated to Round 2 League B

Source: www.sofascore.com
Rules for classification: Tiebreakers
(H) Hosts
Notes:
27 November 2024
12:00

Italy	2–1	Poland
Cimò 6'; Sciabica 14'	Report	Piekarska 8'

MOSIR Brzeg, Brzeg
Referee: Jelena Pejković (Croatia)
27 November 2024
14:00

England	2–1	Turkey
Agyemang 56'; Baker 89'	Report	Temel 33'

Stadion Miejski w Nysie, Nysa
Referee: Silvia Domingos (Portugal)

30 November 2024
12:00

Poland	8–0	Turkey
Piekarska 4'; Bogucka 23'; Flis 36'; Zielińska 39'; Sikora 66'; Guzik 68'; Gutowska 75', 89'	Report

Stadion Miejski w Nysie, Nysa
Referee: Jelena Pejković (Croatia)
30 November 2024
13:00

England	1–0	Italy
Dent 15'	Report

MOSIR Brzeg, Brzeg
Referee: Kristina Georgieva (Bulgaria)

3 December 2024
13:00

Poland	1–0	England
Grzywińska 15'	Report

MOSIR Brzeg, Brzeg
Referee: Kristina Georgieva (Bulgaria)
3 December 2024
13:00

Turkey	0–10	Italy
	Report	Tironi 5', 48', 76', 78'; Ferraresi 26'; Fadda 33'; Pizzuti 36'; Perselli 42'; Tiraş 58' (o.g.); Testa 62'

Stadion Miejski w Nysie, Nysa
Referee: Silvia Domingos (Portugal)

==== Group A5 ====
Pos	Team	Pld	W	D	L	GF	GA	GD	Pts	Transfer or relegation
1	Austria	3	2	1	0	9	1	+8	7	Transferred to Round 2 League A
2	Czech Republic	3	1	2	0	4	0	+4	5	Transferred to Round 2 League A
3	Serbia (H)	3	1	1	1	6	3	+3	4	Transferred to Round 2 League A
4	Faroe Islands	3	0	0	3	2	17	−15	0	Relegated to Round 2 League B

Source: www.sofascore.com
Rules for classification: Tiebreakers
(H) Hosts
27 November 2024
11:00

Czech Republic	0–0	Austria
	Report

Serbian FA Sports Center, Stara Pazova
Referee: Lotta Vuorio (Finland)
27 November 2024
14:00

Serbia	6–1	Faroe Islands
Nikolić 2'; Maljković 5'; Tešnjak 8', 27'; Milovanović 45+3'; Kocic 81'	Report	Zakariasardóttir 11'

Serbian FA Sports Center, Stara Pazova
Referee: Deborah Anex (Switzerland)

30 November 2024
11:00

Austria	7–1	Faroe Islands
Sisic 26', 59', 82'; Herbst 44'; Adamu 54'; Illinger 63'; Höcherl 70'	Report	Ernstsdóttir 61'

Serbian FA Sports Center, Stara Pazova
Referee: Lotta Vuorio (Finland)
30 November 2024
14:00

Serbia	0–0	Czech Republic
	Report

Serbian FA Sports Center, Stara Pazova
Referee: Abigail Byrne (England)

3 December 2024
13:00

Austria	2–0	Serbia
Gutmann 41' (pen.); Gajić 65' (o.g.)	Report

Serbian FA Sports Center, Stara Pazova
Referee: Abigail Byrne (England)
3 December 2024
13:00

Faroe Islands	0–4	Czech Republic
	Report	Krejčová 21'; Trachtová 23'; Krůtová 42'; Jakubů 45'

Serbian FA Sports Center, Stara Pazova
Referee: Deborah Anex (Switzerland)

==== Group A6 ====
Pos	Team	Pld	W	D	L	GF	GA	GD	Pts	Transfer or relegation
1	Spain (H)	3	3	0	0	15	0	+15	9	Transferred to Round 2 League A
2	Belgium	3	1	1	1	3	8	−5	4	Transferred to Round 2 League A
3	Iceland	3	0	2	1	2	5	−3	2	Transferred to Round 2 League A
4	Northern Ireland	3	0	1	2	2	9	−7	1	Relegated to Round 2 League B

Source: www.sofascore.com
Rules for classification: Tiebreakers
(H) Hosts
27 November 2024
12:00

Spain	6–0	Northern Ireland
Segura 38'; Arques 50'; Marisa 53'; Cubo 62'; Cerrato 66', 90+5'	Report

Pinatar Arena, Murcia
Referee: Michalina Diakow (Poland)
27 November 2024
18:00

Iceland	1–1	Belgium
Sveinsdóttir 40'	Report	Bal 90+5'

Pinatar Arena, Murcia
Referee: Karoline Wacker (Germany)

30 November 2024
12:00

Spain	3–0	Iceland
Librán 8'; Agote 24'; Segura 26'	Report

Pinatar Arena, Murcia
Referee: Sabina Bolic (Croatia)
30 November 2024
18:00

Belgium	2–1	Northern Ireland
Verhoeven 4', 47'	Report	Loughran 45'

Pinatar Arena, Murcia
Referee: Karoline Wacker (Germany)

3 December 2024
12:00

Belgium	0–6	Spain
	Report	Gómez 42', 57', 81'; Agote 62'; Heyman 74' (o.g.); Cubo 90+1'

Pinatar Arena, Murcia
Referee: Sabina Bolic (Croatia)
3 December 2024
12:00

Northern Ireland	1–1	Iceland
Boothroyd 84'	Report	Tryggvadóttir 87'

Pinatar Arena, Murcia
Referee: Michalina Diakow (Poland)

==== Group A7 ====
Pos	Team	Pld	W	D	L	GF	GA	GD	Pts	Transfer or relegation
1	Netherlands	3	2	0	1	11	4	+7	6 (Note: Head-to-head results: Netherlands 6–3 Scotland, Sweden 1–2 Scotland, Sweden 1–0 Netherlands. Head-to-head standings: Netherlands: 3 pts, +2 GD (6 GF, 4 GA); Sweden: 3 pts, 0 GD (2 GF, 2 GA); Scotland: 3 pts, -2 GD (5 GF, 7 GA))	Transferred to Round 2 League A
2	Sweden	3	2	0	1	7	3	+4	6	Transferred to Round 2 League A
3	Scotland	3	2	0	1	8	7	+1	6	Transferred to Round 2 League A
4	Hungary (H)	3	0	0	3	1	13	−12	0	Relegated to Round 2 League B

Source: www.sofascore.com
Rules for classification: Tiebreakers
(H) Hosts
Notes:
27 November 2024
13:00

Hungary	1–5	Sweden
Sinka 53'	Report	Hultbäck 33'; Jensen 44'; Schröder 60'; Larsson 72'; Sjödahl 75'

Globall Football Park, Telki
Referee: Miriama Bočková (Slovakia)
27 November 2024
16:00

Netherlands	6–3	Scotland
Van Hensbergen 4', 23'; Oude Elberink 45+3'; Ivens 80'; Verdaasdonk 84'; Van Koppen 90+4'	Report	Berry 27', 32', 41'

Globall Football Park, Telki
Referee: Ana Maria Terteleac (Romania)

30 November 2024
13:00

Netherlands	5–0	Hungary
Ivens 2'; Van Koppen 15'; Verdaasdonk 19'; Van Hensbergen 74' (pen.); Van Vugt 84'	Report

Globall Football Park, Telki
Referee: Emanuela Rusta (Albania)
30 November 2024
16:00

Sweden	1–2	Scotland
Schröder 78'	Report	Forrest 10'; Greenwood 55'

Globall Football Park, Telki
Referee: Miriama Bočková (Slovakia)

3 December 2024
14:00

Sweden	1–0	Netherlands
Schröder 29'	Report

Globall Football Park, Telki
Referee: Emanuela Rusta (Albania)
3 December 2024
14:00

Scotland	3–0	Hungary
Berry 6', 78'; Morran 17'	Report

Globall Football Park, Telki
Referee: Ana Maria Terteleac (Romania)

=== League B ===
Times are CET (UTC+1) as listed by UEFA (local times, if different, are in parentheses).

==== Group B1 ====
Pos	Team	Pld	W	D	L	GF	GA	GD	Pts	Promotion or transfer
1	Belarus	3	3	0	0	16	1	+15	9	Promoted to Round 2 League A
2	Albania (H)	3	2	0	1	6	3	+3	6	Transferred to Round 2 League B
3	Montenegro	3	1	0	2	6	6	0	3	Transferred to Round 2 League B
4	Moldova	3	0	0	3	0	18	−18	0	Transferred to Round 2 League B

Source: www.sofascore.com
Rules for classification: Tiebreakers
(H) Hosts
27 November 2024
13:30

Montenegro	1–2	Albania
Doknić 48'	Report	Qose 30'; Ndoj 68'

Arena Kombëtare, Tirana
Referee: Laura Mauricio (Switzerland)
27 November 2024
14:30

Belarus	10–0	Moldova
Kavaliova 4', 12', 55', 64', 67', 80'; Kaliuta 7', 48', 83' (pen.); Yatsynovich 45+2'	Report

House of Football Natural Pitch, Tirana
Referee: Jana Van Laere (Belgium)

30 November 2024
11:00

Belarus	4–0	Montenegro
Kaliuta 5' (pen.), 84'; Kavaliova 12'; Yatsynovich 87'	Report

House of Football Natural Pitch, Tirana
Referee: Galiya Echeva (Bulgaria)
30 November 2024
13:30

Albania	3–0	Moldova
Vata 6'; Burac 38' (o.g.); Ndoj 52'	Report

Arena Kombëtare, Tirana
Referee: Laura Mauricio (Switzerland)

3 December 2024
13:30

Albania	1–2	Belarus
Vasa 89'	Report	Putsykovich 27'; Kavaliova 83'

Arena Kombëtare, Tirana
Referee: Galiya Echeva (Bulgaria)
3 December 2024
13:30

Moldova	0–5	Montenegro
	Report	Radevic 13'; Milović 16', 44'; Tomašević 40'; Bojanić 45+1'

House of Football Natural Pitch, Tirana
Referee: Jana Van Laere (Belgium)

==== Group B2 ====
Pos	Team	Pld	W	D	L	GF	GA	GD	Pts	Promotion or transfer
1	Romania (H)	3	1	2	0	14	2	+12	5 (Note: Head-to-head results: Kazakhstan 0–0 Latvia, Romania 0–0 Kazakhstan, Latvia 2–2 Romania. Head-to-head standings: Romania: 2 pts, 0 GD (2 GF, 2 GA); Latvia: 2 pts, 0 GD (2 GF, 2 GA); Kazakhstan: 2 pts, 0 GD (0 GF, 0 GA); Romania and Latvia ranked on overall goal difference: Romania: +12, Latvia: +3)	Promoted to Round 2 League A
2	Latvia	3	1	2	0	5	2	+3	5	Transferred to Round 2 League B
3	Kazakhstan	3	1	2	0	7	0	+7	5	Transferred to Round 2 League B
4	Liechtenstein	3	0	0	3	0	22	−22	0	Transferred to Round 2 League B

Source: www.sofascore.com
Rules for classification: Tiebreakers
(H) Hosts
Notes:
27 November 2024
10:00

Kazakhstan	0–0	Latvia
	Report

Football Centre FRF, Buftea
Referee: Ioanna Allayiotou (Cyprus)
27 November 2024
14:00

Romania	12–0	Liechtenstein
Savu 13'; Menard 16'; Niculescu 20'; Stancu 22' (pen.), 71', 75', 78', 90+1'; Szoke 27'; Ouatu 79'; Vuia 89'; Șova 90+3'	Report

Stadionul Mogoșoaia, Mogoșoaia
Referee: Maïka Vanderstichel (France)

30 November 2024
10:00

Latvia	3–0	Liechtenstein
Punga 17'; Baltrušaite 83'; Cīrule 84'	Report

Football Centre FRF, Buftea
Referee: Ioanna Allayiotou (Cyprus)
30 November 2024
14:00

Romania	0–0	Kazakhstan
	Report

Stadionul Mogoșoaia, Mogoșoaia
Referee: Jelena Medjedovic (Serbia)

3 December 2024
11:00

Latvia	2–2	Romania
Upīte 25'; Punga 57'	Report	Niculescu 49'; Trandafir 90+5'

Stadionul Mogoșoaia, Mogoșoaia
Referee: Jelena Medjedovic (Serbia)
3 December 2024
11:00

Liechtenstein	0–7	Kazakhstan
	Report	Popova 9', 39'; Aldanazar 14' (pen.), 66', 71'; Lozukova 38', 86' (pen.)

Football Centre FRF, Buftea
Referee: Maïka Vanderstichel (France)

==== Group B3 ====
Pos	Team	Pld	W	D	L	GF	GA	GD	Pts	Promotion or transfer
1	Wales	3	3	0	0	10	1	+9	9	Promoted to Round 2 League A
2	Georgia	3	2	0	1	5	4	+1	6	Transferred to Round 2 League B
3	Bosnia and Herzegovina (H)	3	1	0	2	6	3	+3	3	Transferred to Round 2 League B
4	Lithuania	3	0	0	3	0	13	−13	0	Transferred to Round 2 League B

Source: www.sofascore.com
Rules for classification: Tiebreakers
(H) Hosts
26 November 2024
13:00

Bosnia and Herzegovina	0–1	Georgia
	Report	Metonidze 3'

Ugljevik City Stadium, Ugljevik
Referee: Cansu Tryak (Türkiye)
26 November 2024
13:00

Lithuania	0–4	Wales
	Report	Francis 39', 55', 72'; Scarlett 45+3'

Stadium Etno Selo Stanišići, Bijeljina
Referee: Reelika Turi (Estonia)

29 November 2024
13:00

Bosnia and Herzegovina	5–0	Lithuania
Dizdarević 11', 23'; Garibija 17'; Bratović 22'; Rankić 90+3'	Report

Stadium Etno Selo Stanišići, Bijeljina
Referee: Farida Lutfaliyeva (Azerbaijan)
29 November 2024
13:00

Wales	4–0	Georgia
Salisbury-Williams 38'; Cole 45+3'; Bowen 62'; Scarlett 66'	Report

Ugljevik City Stadium, Ugljevik
Referee: Reelika Turi (Estonia)

2 December 2024
13:00

Wales	2–1	Bosnia and Herzegovina
Francis 1'; Lee 15'	Report	Garibija 55'

Ugljevik City Stadium, Ugljevik
Referee: Farida Lutfaliyeva (Azerbaijan)
2 December 2024
13:00

Georgia	4–0	Lithuania
Kankia 31' (pen.); Khelashvili 43'; Bukhrikidze 45+4' (pen.), 90+3'	Report

Stadium Etno Selo Stanišići, Bijeljina
Referee: Cansu Tryak (Türkiye)

==== Group B4 ====
Pos	Team	Pld	W	D	L	GF	GA	GD	Pts	Promotion or transfer
1	Slovenia	3	3	0	0	11	1	+10	9	Promoted to Round 2 League A
2	Croatia (H)	3	2	0	1	4	1	+3	6	Transferred to Round 2 League B
3	Luxembourg	3	1	0	2	3	5	−2	3	Transferred to Round 2 League B
4	Malta	3	0	0	3	1	12	−11	0	Transferred to Round 2 League B

Source: www.sofascore.com
Rules for classification: Tiebreakers
(H) Hosts
27 November 2024
12:00

Slovenia	7–0	Malta
Trost 2'; Gerbec 9'; Medić 45'; Kern 76'; Micallef 80' (o.g.); Omerzu 84'; Špiler 90+4'	Report

Stadion Lučko, Lučko
Referee: Audrey Gerbel (France)
27 November 2024
13:00

Luxembourg	0–1	Croatia
	Report	Vlajčević 45+3'

Stadion Sv. Josip Radnik, Sesvete
Referee: Charlotte Carpenter (Wales)

30 November 2024
12:00

Slovenia	3–1	Luxembourg
Testen 35' (pen.); Kern 85'; Omerza 89'	Report	Marinelli 42'

Ivan Laljak-Ivić Stadium, Zaprešić
Referee: Briet Bragadottir (Iceland)
30 November 2024
13:00

Croatia	3–0	Malta
Vlajčević 4' (pen.), 80'; Grdiša 71'	Report

Stadion Lučko, Lučko
Referee: Charlotte Carpenter (Wales)

3 December 2024
13:00

Croatia	0–1	Slovenia
	Report	Medić 71'

Ivan Laljak-Ivić Stadium, Zaprešić
Referee: Briet Bragadottir (Iceland)
3 December 2024
13:00

Malta	1–2	Luxembourg
Al Girbi 32'	Report	Schmit 59'; Borruso 77'

Stadion Sv. Josip Radnik, Sesvete
Referee: Audrey Gerbel (France)

==== Group B5 ====
Pos	Team	Pld	W	D	L	GF	GA	GD	Pts	Promotion or transfer
1	Switzerland	3	3	0	0	13	0	+13	9	Promoted to Round 2 League A
2	Estonia	3	2	0	1	6	2	+4	6	Transferred to Round 2 League B
3	Cyprus (H)	3	1	0	2	3	6	−3	3	Transferred to Round 2 League B
4	Azerbaijan	3	0	0	3	0	14	−14	0	Transferred to Round 2 League B

Source: www.sofascore.com
Rules for classification: Tiebreakers
(H) Hosts
26 November 2024
10:00

Switzerland	8–0	Azerbaijan
Ragusa 3', 68'; Stoob 39'; Mece 46'; J. Egli 51', 64'; Kamber 77'; L. Egli 90'	Report

Kouklia Community Stadium, Paphos
Referee: Kristina Kozoroh (Ukraine)
26 November 2024
13:30

Cyprus	0–3	Estonia
	Report	Jotkina 42', 67'; Kurg 74'

Stelios Kyriakides Stadium, Paphos
Referee: Ifeoma Kulmala (Finland)

29 November 2024
10:00

Switzerland	3–0	Cyprus
Dysli 70'; Kamber 79'; Mece 86'	Report

Stelios Kyriakides Stadium, Paphos
Referee: Aleksandra Česen (Slovenia)
29 November 2024
10:00

Estonia	3–0	Azerbaijan
Tamm 11'; Jotkina 63' (pen.); Vapper 90+1'	Report

Kouklia Community Stadium, Paphos
Referee: Ifeoma Kulmala (Finland)

2 December 2024
10:00

Estonia	0–2	Switzerland
	Report	Toding 17' (o.g.); Klingenstein 59'

Kouklia Community Stadium, Paphos
Referee: Aleksandra Česen (Slovenia)
2 December 2024
10:00

Azerbaijan	0–3	Cyprus
	Report	Mcbeth 12'; Cusick 41' (pen.); Mylona 82'

Peyia Municipal Stadium, Paphos
Referee: Kristina Kozoroh (Ukraine)

==== Group B6 ====
Pos	Team	Pld	W	D	L	GF	GA	GD	Pts	Promotion or transfer
1	Ukraine	2	1	1	0	3	1	+2	4 (Note: Ranked on disciplinary points: Ukraine: –2, Israel: –10.)	Promoted to Round 2 League A
2	Israel	2	1	1	0	3	1	+2	4	Promoted to Round 2 League A
3	Armenia (H)	2	0	0	2	0	4	−4	0	Transferred to Round 2 League B

Source: www.sofascore.com
Rules for classification: Tiebreakers
(H) Hosts
Notes:
26 November 2024
12:00

Armenia	0–2	Ukraine
	Report	Stakhniuk 27'; Ptytsyna 90+2'

FFA Academy Stadium, Yerevan
Referee: Tatyana Sorokopudova (Kazakhstan)

29 November 2024
12:00

Ukraine	1–1	Israel
Zaborovets 72' (pen.)	Report	Workou 50'

FFA Academy Stadium, Yerevan
Referee: Eglantina Pjetrushaj (Albania)

2 December 2024
12:00

Israel	2–0	Armenia
Workou 8'; Biru 49'	Report

FFA Academy Stadium, Yerevan
Referee: Vanja Jankovic (Slovenia)

==== Ranking of second-placed teams ====
To determine the best runner-up team, only the results of the runner-up teams against the first- and third-placed teams in their group were taken into account (Regulations Article 18.01).

Pos	Grp	Team	Pld	W	D	L	GF	GA	GD	Pts	Promotion
1	B6	Israel	2	1	1	0	3	1	+2	4	Promoted to Round 2 League A
2	B5	Estonia	2	1	0	1	3	2	+1	3	
3	B1	Albania	2	1	0	1	3	3	0	3	
4	B4	Croatia	2	1	0	1	1	1	0	3	
5	B3	Georgia	2	1	0	1	1	4	−3	3	
6	B2	Latvia	2	0	2	0	2	2	0	2	

Source: UEFA
Rules for classification: 1) points; 2) goal difference; 3) goals scored; 4) disciplinary points; 5) position in the applicable rankings.

== Round 2 ==
=== Draw ===
The draw for the Round 2 was held on 6 December 2024, at the UEFA headquarters in Nyon, Switzerland.

The 51 participating teams were split into two Leagues (28 in League A, 23 in League B) according to their final group standings of Round 1 (Regulations Article 15.01). To determine this ranking, the following criteria were followed:

1. higher position in the following classification:
  1. Round 1 League A group winners
  2. Round 1 League A group runners-up
  3. Round 1 League A third-placed teams
  4. Teams promoted from Round 1 League B
  5. Teams relegated from Round 1 League A
  6. Round 1 League B runners-up
  7. Round 1 League B third-placed teams
  8. Round 1 League B fourth-placed teams
2. higher number of points in all mini-tournament matches;
3. superior goal difference in all mini-tournament matches;
4. higher number of goals scored in all mini-tournament matches;
5. lower disciplinary points (red card = 3 points, yellow card = 1 point, expulsion for two yellow cards in one match = 3 points);
6. higher position in the 2023–24 Round 2 league rankings.

Within each League, the teams were allocated to four drawing pots (seven teams per pot in League A; six teams in Pots 1 to 3 and five teams in Pot 4 in League B). Teams in the same pot would be drawn into different groups, with League A consisting of seven groups of four teams, and League B consisting of five groups of four and one group of three teams.

Teams entering League A

The 21 teams of Round 1 League A (top three teams in each group) and the seven teams of Round 1 League B (six group winners and the best runner-up) were drawn into seven groups of four teams. The Round 1 League A group winners were automatically seeded into Pot 1, the second- and third-placed teams into Pots 2 and 3, respectively. The Round 1 League B teams were seeded into Pot 4; their matches against the fourth-placed teams in their group did not count towards this ranking (Regulations Article 15.01).

Pos	Gr (Rk)	Team	Pld	W	D	L	GF	GA	GD	Pts	Seeding
1	A2 (1)	France	3	3	0	0	16	0	+16	9	Pot 1
2	A6 (1)	Spain	3	3	0	0	15	0	+15	9	Pot 1
3	A1 (1)	Germany	3	3	0	0	13	1	+12	9	Pot 1
4	A3 (1)	Norway	3	3	0	0	6	0	+6	9	Pot 1
5	A5 (1)	Austria	3	2	1	0	9	1	+8	7	Pot 1
6	A4 (1)	Italy	3	2	0	1	12	2	+10	6	Pot 1
7	A7 (1)	Netherlands	3	2	0	1	11	4	+7	6	Pot 1
8	A4 (2)	Poland	3	2	0	1	10	2	+8	6	Pot 2
9	A7 (2)	Sweden	3	2	0	1	7	3	+4	6	Pot 2
10	A3 (2)	Republic of Ireland	3	2	0	1	5	2	+3	6	Pot 2
11	A2 (2)	Portugal	3	2	0	1	5	4	+1	6	Pot 2
12	A1 (2)	Denmark	3	2	0	1	5	5	0	6	Pot 2
13	A5 (2)	Czech Republic	3	1	2	0	4	0	+4	5	Pot 2
14	A6 (2)	Belgium	3	1	1	1	3	8	−5	4	Pot 2
15	A7 (3)	Scotland	3	2	0	1	8	7	+1	6	Pot 3
16	A4 (3)	England	3	2	0	1	3	2	+1	6	Pot 3
17	A5 (3)	Serbia	3	1	1	1	6	3	+3	4	Pot 3
18	A3 (3)	Finland	3	1	0	2	5	4	+1	3	Pot 3
19	A1 (3)	Greece	3	1	0	2	2	5	−3	3	Pot 3
20	A2 (3)	Slovakia	3	1	0	2	4	10	−6	3	Pot 3
21	A6 (3)	Iceland	3	0	2	1	2	5	−3	2	Pot 3
22	B3 (1)	Wales	2	2	0	0	6	1	+5	6 (Note: Ranked on disciplinary points: Wales: –3, Belarus: –5.)	Pot 4
23	B1 (1)	Belarus	2	2	0	0	6	1	+5	6	Pot 4
24	B5 (1)	Switzerland	2	2	0	0	5	0	+5	6	Pot 4
25	B4 (1)	Slovenia	2	2	0	0	4	1	+3	6	Pot 4
26	B6 (1)	Ukraine	2	1	1	0	3	1	+2	4	Pot 4
27	B2 (1)	Romania	2	0	2	0	2	2	0	2	Pot 4
28	B6 (2)	Israel	2	1	1	0	3	1	+2	4	Pot 4

Source: UEFA
Rules for classification: 1) round 1 position; 2) points; 3) goal difference; 4) goals scored; 5) disciplinary points; 6) position in the applicable rankings.
Notes:

Teams entering League B

The seven fourth-placed teams of Round 1 League A and the 16 non-promoted teams of Round 1 League B were drawn into six groups of three or four teams. The best six fourth-placed teams of Round 1 League A were automatically seeded into Pot 1. The seventh fourth-placed team of Round 1 League A and the runner-up teams of Round 1 League B were seeded into Pot 2. The third- and fourth-placed teams of Round 1 League B were seeded into Pots 3 and 4, respectively. The matches of the second- and third-placed teams of Round 1 League B against the fourth-placed teams in their group did not count towards this ranking (Regulations Article 15.01).

Pos	Gr (Rk)	Team	Pld	W	D	L	GF	GA	GD	Pts	Seeding
1	A6 (4)	Northern Ireland	3	0	1	2	2	9	−7	1	Pot 1
2	A1 (4)	Kosovo	3	0	0	3	0	9	−9	0	Pot 1
3	A3 (4)	Bulgaria	3	0	0	3	0	10	−10	0	Pot 1
4	A2 (4)	North Macedonia	3	0	0	3	0	11	−11	0	Pot 1
5	A7 (4)	Hungary	3	0	0	3	1	13	−12	0	Pot 1
6	A5 (4)	Faroe Islands	3	0	0	3	2	17	−15	0	Pot 1
7	A4 (4)	Turkey	3	0	0	3	1	20	−19	0	Pot 2
8	B5 (2)	Estonia	2	1	0	1	3	2	+1	3	Pot 2
9	B1 (2)	Albania	2	1	0	1	3	3	0	3	Pot 2
10	B4 (2)	Croatia	2	1	0	1	1	1	0	3	Pot 2
11	B3 (2)	Georgia	2	1	0	1	1	4	−3	3	Pot 2
12	B2 (2)	Latvia	2	0	2	0	2	2	0	2	Pot 2
13	B2 (3)	Kazakhstan	2	0	2	0	0	0	0	2	Pot 3
14	B3 (3)	Bosnia and Herzegovina	2	0	0	2	1	3	−2	0	Pot 3
15	B4 (3)	Luxembourg	2	0	0	2	1	4	−3	0	Pot 3
16	B6 (3)	Armenia	2	0	0	2	0	4	−4	0	Pot 3
17	B1 (3)	Montenegro	2	0	0	2	1	6	−5	0	Pot 3
18	B5 (3)	Cyprus	2	0	0	2	0	6	−6	0	Pot 3
19	B4 (4)	Malta	3	0	0	3	1	12	−11	0	Pot 4
20	B3 (4)	Lithuania	3	0	0	3	0	13	−13	0	Pot 4
21	B5 (4)	Azerbaijan	3	0	0	3	0	14	−14	0	Pot 4
22	B1 (4)	Moldova	3	0	0	3	0	18	−18	0	Pot 4
23	B2 (4)	Liechtenstein	3	0	0	3	0	22	−22	0	Pot 4

Source: UEFA
Rules for classification: 1) round 1 position; 2) points; 3) goal difference; 4) goals scored; 5) disciplinary points; 6) position in the applicable rankings.

=== League A ===
Times are CEST (UTC+2) as listed by UEFA (local times, if different, are in parentheses).

==== Group A1 ====
Pos	Team	Pld	W	D	L	GF	GA	GD	Pts	Qualification or relegation
1	Netherlands (H)	3	3	0	0	11	0	+11	9	Qualified for the final tournament
2	Denmark	3	2	0	1	4	2	+2	6	
3	Greece	3	1	0	2	4	7	−3	3	
4	Romania	3	0	0	3	0	10	−10	0	Relegated to League B for the next season's qualification

Source: www.sofascore.com
Rules for classification: Tiebreakers
(H) Hosts
2 April 2025
19:00

Netherlands	5–0	Romania
Van Hensbergen 31' (pen.), 45', 45+2'; Weiman 41'; Zuidberg 48'	Report

De Langeleegte, Veendam
Referee: Sofik Torosyan (Armenia)
2 April 2025
19:00

Greece	1–2	Denmark
Platania 56'	Report	Antvorskov 58'; Aagaard 68'

Sportpark Marsdijk, Assen
Referee: Miriama Bočková (Slovakia)

5 April 2024
12:00

Denmark	2–0	Romania
Aagaard 22'; Højer 79'	Report

De Langeleegte, Veendam
Referee: Miriama Bočková (Slovakia)
5 April 2025
16:00

Netherlands	5–0	Greece
van Egmond 11', 30'; Ivens 19'; van Hensbergen 32'; Weiman 39'	Report

Sportpark Marsdijk, Assen
Referee: Merima Čelik (Bosnia and Herzegovina)

8 April 2025
19:00

Denmark	0–1	Netherlands
	Report	Weerelts 52'

De Langeleegte, Veendam
Referee: Merima Čelik (Bosnia and Herzegovina)
8 April 2025
19:00

Romania	0–3	Greece
	Report	Mougiou 13'; Tzourtzevits 25'; Platania 64'

Sportpark Marsdijk, Assen
Referee: Sofik Torosyan (Armenia)

==== Group A2 ====
Pos	Team	Pld	W	D	L	GF	GA	GD	Pts	Qualification or relegation
1	Portugal (H)	3	2	1	0	8	2	+6	7	Qualified for the final tournament
2	Norway	3	2	1	0	3	1	+2	7	
3	Iceland	3	1	0	2	4	4	0	3	
4	Slovenia	3	0	0	3	2	10	−8	0	Relegated to League B for the next season's qualification

Source: www.sofascore.com
Rules for classification: Tiebreakers
(H) Hosts
2 April 2025
15:30

Norway	1–0	Slovenia
Warvik 81'	Report

Real Sport Club, Queluz
Referee: Jana Van Laere (Belgium)
2 April 2025
18:30

Iceland	0–2	Portugal
	Report	Correia 42', 58'

Estádio Nacional do Jamor, Oeiras
Referee: Nanna Løf Andersen (Denmark)

5 April 2025
16:00

Norway	1–0	Iceland
Dorsin 15'	Report

Estádio Nacional do Jamor, Oeiras
Referee: Michaela Pachtova (Czech Republic)
5 April 2025
19:00

Portugal	5–1	Slovenia
Marques 3', 8'; Guedes 53'; Costa 56'; Santiago 72'	Report	Kršljin 82'

Cidade do Futebol, Oeiras
Referee: Nanna Løf Andersen (Denmark)

8 April 2025
17:00

Portugal	1–1	Norway
Guedes 76'	Report	Nigårdsøy 15'

Cidade do Futebol, Oeiras
Referee: Michaela Pachtova (Czech Republic)
8 April 2025
17:00

Slovenia	1–4	Iceland
Dolinar 50'	Report	H. Jónsdóttir 4'; Joostdóttir Van Bemme 59'; Halldórsdóttir 83'; R. Jónsdóttir 87'

Estádio Nacional do Jamor, Oeiras
Referee: Jana Van Laere (Belgium)

==== Group A3 ====
Pos	Team	Pld	W	D	L	GF	GA	GD	Pts	Qualification or relegation
1	England (H)	3	3	0	0	21	1	+20	9	Qualified for the final tournament
2	Austria	3	2	0	1	7	6	+1	6	
3	Belgium	3	1	0	2	5	10	−5	3	
4	Ukraine	3	0	0	3	1	17	−16	0	Relegated to League B for the next season's qualification

Source: www.sofascore.com
Rules for classification: Tiebreakers
(H) Hosts
2 April 2025
15:00

England	6–0	Belgium
Lia 3', 25'; Baker 18' (pen.), 77'; Harbert 82'; Gale 90'	Report

St George's Park, Burton upon Trent
Referee: Galiya Echeva (Bulgaria)
2 April 2025
19:30

Austria	3–0 (w/o)	Ukraine
	Report

St George's Park, Burton upon Trent
Referee: Jelena Kumer (Croatia)

5 April 2025
15:00

Austria	1–5	England
Gutmann 13'	Report	Baker 5'; Newell 9'; Lia 43'; Agyemang 56'; Gale 78'

St George's Park, Burton upon Trent
Referee: Lotta Vuorio (Finland)
5 April 2025
19:30

Belgium	4–1	Ukraine
Hermans 22'; Verhoeven 29', 68'; Priem 85'	Report	Zaborovets 60'

St George's Park, Burton upon Trent
Referee: Galiya Echeva (Bulgaria)

8 April 2025
15:00

Belgium	1–3	Austria
Hubaut 36'	Report	Rapf 65'; Sisic 69', 72'

St George's Park, Burton upon Trent
Referee: Lotta Vuorio (Finland)
8 April 2025
15:00

Ukraine	0–10	England
	Report	Brown 2', 9' (pen.), 79'; Gale 26'; Ademiluyi 33', 39', 46', 59'; Baker 45+1'; Reid 51'

St George's Park, Burton upon Trent
Referee: Jelena Kumer (Croatia)

==== Group A4 ====
Pos	Team	Pld	W	D	L	GF	GA	GD	Pts	Qualification or relegation
1	Italy (H)	3	2	1	0	13	2	+11	7	Qualified for the final tournament
2	Sweden	3	2	1	0	4	0	+4	7	Qualified for the final tournament
3	Belarus	3	0	1	2	2	9	−7	1	
4	Slovakia	3	0	1	2	2	10	−8	1	Relegated to League B for the next season's qualification

Source: www.sofascore.com
Rules for classification: Tiebreakers
(H) Hosts
2 April 2025
12:00

Slovakia	0–3	Sweden
	Report	Stojanovska 18'; Schröder 41', 90+1'

Stadio Tullo Morgagni, Forlì
Referee: Kirsty Dowle (England)
2 April 2025
15:00

Italy	7–1	Belarus
Pellegrino Cimò 22', 30'; Ventriglia 27', 76', 90+5'; Pizzuti 64'; Perselli 68'	Report	Imkhovik 81'

Stadio Valentino Mazzola, Santarcangelo di Romagna
Referee: Zoe Stavrou (Cyprus)

5 April 2025
12:00

Sweden	1–0	Belarus
Schröder 34'	Report

Stadio Comunale, Castel San Pietro Terme
Referee: Kirsty Dowle (England)
5 April 2025
15:00

Italy	6–1	Slovakia
Sciabica 4'; Zamboni 7', 11', 18', 58'; Ferraresi 42'	Report	Krumlíková 50'

Stadio Valentino Mazzola, Santarcangelo di Romagna
Referee: Maïka Vanderstichel (France)

8 April 2025
15:00

Sweden	0–0	Italy
	Report

Stadio Tullo Morgagni, Forlì
Referee: Maïka Vanderstichel (France)
8 April 2025
15:00

Belarus	1–1	Slovakia
Siniauskaya 48'	Report	Kramlíková 78'

Stadio Comunale, Castel San Pietro Terme
Referee: Zoe Stavrou (Cyprus)

==== Group A5 ====
Pos	Team	Pld	W	D	L	GF	GA	GD	Pts	Qualification or relegation
1	Spain	3	3	0	0	17	0	+17	9	Qualified for the final tournament
2	Switzerland	3	2	0	1	5	3	+2	6	
3	Scotland (H)	3	1	0	2	4	8	−4	3	
4	Czech Republic	3	0	0	3	0	15	−15	0	Relegated to League B for the next season's qualification

Source: www.sofascore.com
Rules for classification: Tiebreakers
(H) Hosts
2 April 2025
12:00

Spain	3–0	Switzerland
Librán 45+1' (pen.), 70'; Marisa 55'	Report

Broadwood, Cumbernauld
Referee: Audrey Gerbel (France)
2 April 2025
16:30

Scotland	4–0	Czech Republic
Connolly-Jackson 19', 90'; Berry 43', 45+1'	Report

Broadwood, Cumbernauld
Referee: Katarzyna Lisiecka-Sęk (Poland)

5 April 2025
12:00

Spain	4–0	Scotland
Comendador 22', 45+1', 45+4'; Serrajordi 64'	Report

Kirkintilloch Community Sports Complex, Glasgow
Referee: Karoline Wacker (Germany)
5 April 2025
16:30

Czech Republic	0–1	Switzerland
	Report	J. Egli 56'

Kirkintilloch Community Sports Complex, Glasgow
Referee: Katarzyna Lisiecka-Sęk (Poland)

8 April 2025
16:00

Czech Republic	0–10	Spain
	Report	Moreno 33'; Cubo 37'; Segura 41' (pen.), 65'; Marisa 54'; Cerrato 74'; Agote 84', 90+3'; Serrajordi 86'; Noemi 90+1'

Falkirk Stadium, Falkirk
Referee: Karoline Wacker (Germany)
8 April 2025
16:00

Switzerland	4–0	Scotland
Keller 8'; Wandeler 58', 78'; Egli 76'	Report

Falkirk Stadium, Falkirk
Referee: Audrey Gerbel (France)

==== Group A6 ====
Pos	Team	Pld	W	D	L	GF	GA	GD	Pts	Qualification or relegation
1	France	3	3	0	0	7	4	+3	9	Qualified for the final tournament
2	Wales (H)	3	1	1	1	2	2	0	4	
3	Republic of Ireland	3	1	0	2	2	3	−1	3	
4	Serbia	3	0	1	2	4	6	−2	1	Relegated to League B for the next season's qualification

Source: www.sofascore.com
Rules for classification: Tiebreakers
(H) Hosts
2 April 2025
13:00

Serbia	0–1	Republic of Ireland
	Report	Fitzgerald 74'

Ynys Park Stadium, Port Talbot
Referee: Deborah Anex (Switzerland)
2 April 2025
17:00

France	1–0	Wales
Rouquet 37'	Report

Stebonheath Park, Llanelli
Referee: Anastasia Mylopoulou (Greece)

5 April 2025
13:00

Republic of Ireland	0–1	Wales
	Report	Griffiths 28'

Stebonheath Park, Llanelli
Referee: Deborah Anex (Switzerland)
5 April 2025
17:00

France	4–3	Serbia
Mé. Mendy 32'; Ma. Mendy 76'; Swierot 85'; Effa 89'	Report	Nikolić 12'; Čingelić 35'; Ninković 71'

Old Road Training Ground, Briton Ferry
Attendance: 103
Referee: Rasa Grigonė (Lithuania)

8 April 2025
15:00

Republic of Ireland	1–2	France
Brennan 22'	Report	Mendy 82' (pen.); Rouquet 90+3'

Ynys Park Stadium, Port Talbot
Referee: Rasa Grigonė (Lithuania)
8 April 2025
15:00

Wales	1–1	Serbia
Francis 90+6' (pen.)	Report	Uvalin 10'

Stebonheath Park, Llanelli
Referee: Anastasia Mylopoulou (Greece)

==== Group A7 ====
Pos	Team	Pld	W	D	L	GF	GA	GD	Pts	Qualification or relegation
1	Poland (H)	3	2	0	1	8	2	+6	6 (Note: Head-to-head results: Finland 1–0 Poland, Germany 1–0 Finland, Germany 1–2 Poland. Head-to-head standings: Poland: 3 pts, 0 GD (2 GF, 2 GA); Germany: 3 pts, 0 GD (2 GF, 2 GA); Finland: 3 pts, 0 GD (1 GF, 1 GA); Head-to-head result: Germany 1–2 Poland)	Qualified for the final tournament
2	Germany	3	2	0	1	4	2	+2	6	
3	Finland	3	2	0	1	4	2	+2	6	
4	Israel	3	0	0	3	1	11	−10	0	Relegated to League B for the next season's qualification

Source: www.sofascore.com
Rules for classification: Tiebreakers
(H) Hosts
Notes:
2 April 2025
12:00

Finland	1–0	Poland
Mäkelä 9'	Report

Stadion Miejski Inowrocławskich, Inowrocław
Referee: Olivia Tschon (Austria)
2 April 2025
14:00

Germany	2–0	Israel
Schneider 45+3'; Hünten 67'	Report

Stadium im. G. Duneckiego, Toruń
Referee: Emily Heaslip (England)

5 April 2025
12:00

Poland	6–0	Israel
Wyrwas 3'; Gutowska 36'; Sikora 70'; Langosz 83', 90+2'; Lewicka 87'	Report

Stadium im. G. Duneckiego, Toruń
Referee: Olivia Tschon (Austria)
5 April 2025
14:00

Germany	1–0	Finland
Rückert 58'	Report

Stadion Miejski Inowrocławskich, Inowrocław
Referee: Ana Maria Terteleac (Romania)

8 April 2025
12:00

Poland	2–1	Germany
Łapińska 62'; Witek 78'	Report	Boboy 8'

Bydgoszcz Stadium, Bydgoszcz
Referee: Ana Maria Terteleac (Romania)
8 April 2025
12:00

Israel	1–3	Finland
Biru 59'	Report	Råtts 8', 13', 77'

Centrum Sportu Sicienku, Sicienko
Referee: Emily Heaslip (England)

==== Ranking of second-placed teams ====
Poland finished first in their group, but already qualified as the host of the final tournament. Therefore, the best runner-up team of all groups in League A also qualified for the final tournament.

Pos	Grp	Team	Pld	W	D	L	GF	GA	GD	Pts	Qualification
1	A4	Sweden	3	2	1	0	4	0	+4	7	Qualified for the final tournament
2	A2	Norway	3	2	1	0	3	1	+2	7	
3	A5	Switzerland	3	2	0	1	5	3	+2	6	
4	A7	Germany	3	2	0	1	4	2	+2	6	
5	A1	Denmark	3	2	0	1	4	2	+2	6	
6	A3	Austria	3	2	0	1	7	6	+1	6	
7	A6	Wales	3	1	1	1	2	2	0	4	

Source: UEFA
Rules for classification: 1) points; 2) goal difference; 3) goals scored; 4) disciplinary points; 5) position in the applicable rankings.

=== League B ===
Times are CET/CEST, (Note: CET (UTC+1) for dates up to 26 March 2025, and CEST (UTC+2) for dates thereafter.) as listed by UEFA (local times, if different, are in parentheses).

==== Group B1 ====
Pos	Team	Pld	W	D	L	GF	GA	GD	Pts	Promotion
1	Bulgaria (H)	3	3	0	0	12	1	+11	9	Promoted to League A for the next season's qualification
2	Luxembourg	3	1	1	1	11	4	+7	4	
3	Georgia	3	1	1	1	4	3	+1	4	
4	Liechtenstein	3	0	0	3	0	19	−19	0	

Source: www.sofascore.com
Rules for classification: Tiebreakers
(H) Hosts
2 April 2025
10:00

Bulgaria	7–0	Liechtenstein
Petrova 11', 22', 38', 82', 90+1'; Demirova 37' (pen.), 81'	Report

Albena 1 Stadium, Albena
Referee: Elena Gobjila (Moldova)
2 April 2025
15:00

Luxembourg	1–1	Georgia
Miny 71'	Report	Chkhetiani 39'

Albena 1 Stadium, Albena
Referee: Melek Dakan (Türkiye)

5 April 2025
10:00

Bulgaria	3–0	Luxembourg
Naydenova 45+1'; Demirova 68'; Genova 84'	Report

Albena 1 Stadium, Albena
Referee: Milica Milovanovic (Serbia)
5 April 2025
15:00

Georgia	2–0	Liechtenstein
Kankia 15', 77'	Report

Albena 1 Stadium, Albena
Referee: Melek Dakan (Türkiye)

8 April 2025
11:00

Georgia	1–2	Bulgaria
Gogaladze 90+1'	Report	Demirova 6' (pen.); Kamenova 82'

Spartak, Varna
Referee: Milica Milovanovic (Serbia)
8 April 2025
11:00

Liechtenstein	0–10	Luxembourg
	Report	Berdy 10'; Merlevede 20'; Villegas 31', 39', 69'; B. Moreira 47', 53'; Alves 50', 57'; D. Moreira 74'

Albena 1 Stadium, Albena
Referee: Elena Gobjila (Moldova)

==== Group B2 ====
Pos	Team	Pld	W	D	L	GF	GA	GD	Pts	Promotion
1	Faroe Islands	3	2	1	0	11	2	+9	7	Promoted to League A for the next season's qualification
2	Estonia	3	2	1	0	7	3	+4	7	Promoted to League A for the next season's qualification
3	Cyprus	3	1	0	2	5	4	+1	3	
4	Moldova (H)	3	0	0	3	1	15	−14	0	

Source: www.sofascore.com
Rules for classification: Tiebreakers
(H) Hosts
1 April 2025
12:00

Faroe Islands	7–0	Moldova
Ernstsdóttir 22', 49'; Zakariasardóttir 32', 40', 71'; Dalheim 36'; Mikkelsen 90+1'	Report

Nisporeni Central Stadium, Nisporeni
Referee: Farida Lutfaliyeva (Azerbaijan)
1 April 2025
12:00

Cyprus	0–2	Estonia
	Report	Mirjam 3'; Juksar 30'

CSR Orhei, Orhei
Referee: Eglantina Pjetrushaj (Albania)

4 April 2025
12:00

Faroe Islands	2–0	Cyprus
Zakariasardóttir 11'; Dalheim 56'	Report

CSR Orhei, Orhei
Referee: Sofiya Prychyna (Ukraine)
4 April 2025
12:00

Estonia	3–1	Moldova
Komarovskiy 9'; Kelli 17' (pen.); Jotkina 23'	Report	Tihonciuc 62'

Nisporeni Central Stadium, Nisporeni
Referee: Eglantina Pjetrushaj (Albania)

7 April 2025
12:00

Estonia	2–2	Faroe Islands
Jotkina 12', 26'	Report	Zakariasardóttir 65'; Mikkelsen 90+1'

CSR Orhei, Orhei
Referee: Sofiya Prychyna (Ukraine)
7 April 2025
12:00

Moldova	0–5	Cyprus
	Report	McBeth 5'; Petkovski 32'; Tsoukka 54', 60', 65'

Nisporeni Central Stadium, Nisporeni
Referee: Farida Lutfaliyeva (Azerbaijan)

==== Group B3 ====
Pos	Team	Pld	W	D	L	GF	GA	GD	Pts	Promotion
1	Kosovo	3	3	0	0	12	1	+11	9	Promoted to League A for the next season's qualification
2	Latvia	3	1	1	1	4	6	−2	4	
3	Malta (H)	3	0	2	1	1	7	−6	2	
4	Kazakhstan	3	0	1	2	2	5	−3	1	

Source: www.sofascore.com
Rules for classification: Tiebreakers
(H) Hosts
1 April 2025
11:00

Kosovo	6–0	Malta
Paci 21', 42', 70'; Maqastena 39'; Kallaba 57'; Zogaj 89'	Report

Centenary Stadium, Ta' Qali
Referee: Kristina Kozoroh (Ukraine)
1 April 2025
14:30

Kazakhstan	1–3	Latvia
Beibut 77'	Report	Ansone 12'; Dzene 24'; Jaunslaviete 64'

Centenary Stadium, Ta' Qali
Referee: Vanja Jankovic (Slovenia)

4 April 2025
11:00

Kosovo	2–1	Kazakhstan
Berisha 54' (pen.); Maqastena 90+8'	Report	Aissapar 32'

Centenary Stadium, Ta' Qali
Referee: Wendy Gijsbers (Netherlands)
4 April 2025
14:30

Latvia	1–1	Malta
Dzene 48'	Report	Azzopardi 8'

Centenary Stadium, Ta' Qali
Referee: Vanja Jankovic (Slovenia)

7 April 2025
11:00

Malta	0–0	Kazakhstan
	Report

Centenary Stadium, Ta' Qali
Referee: Kristina Kozoroh (Ukraine)
7 April 2025
14:30

Latvia	0–4	Kosovo
	Report	Shabani 36'; Orana 42'; Paci 59'; Maqastena 90+4'

Centenary Stadium, Ta' Qali
Referee: Wendy Gijsbers (Netherlands)

==== Group B4 ====
Pos	Team	Pld	W	D	L	GF	GA	GD	Pts	Promotion
1	Northern Ireland	3	3	0	0	12	0	+12	9	Promoted to League A for the next season's qualification
2	Montenegro	3	2	0	1	4	5	−1	6	
3	Albania (H)	3	1	0	2	5	7	−2	3	
4	Azerbaijan	3	0	0	3	1	10	−9	0	

Source: www.sofascore.com
Rules for classification: Tiebreakers
(H) Hosts
18 February 2025
11:30

Northern Ireland	4–0	Azerbaijan
Conway 10', 51'; Sweetlove 42'; Boothroyd 58'	Report

House of Football Natural Pitch, Tirana
Referee: Roxana Recorean (Romania)
18 February 2025
14:30

Montenegro	2–1	Albania
Čađenović 18' (pen.); Osmajić 25'	Report	Ndoj 16'

Elbasan Arena, Elbasan
Referee: Martina Molinaro (Italy)

21 February 2025
12:30

Northern Ireland	3–0	Montenegro
Keenan 58'; Kerr 68'; Maguire 80'	Report

House of Football Natural Pitch, Tirana
Referee: Filipa Pereira Cunha (Portugal)
21 February 2025
14:30

Albania	4–0	Azerbaijan
Ndoj 23', 47'; Vasa 56', 70'	Report

Egnatia Arena, Rrogozhinë
Referee: Martina Molinaro (Italy)

24 February 2025
14:30

Albania	0–5	Northern Ireland
	Report	Kerr 3', 34' (pen.); Gargan 50'; Boothroyd 78'; Ferreira 90+4'

Egnatia Arena, Rrogozhinë
Referee: Filipa Pereira Cunha (Portugal)
24 February 2025
14:30

Azerbaijan	1–2	Montenegro
Ziyadova 66'	Report	Čađenović 8'; Nikčević 68'

House of Football Natural Pitch, Tirana
Referee: Roxana Recorean (Romania)

==== Group B5 ====
Pos	Team	Pld	W	D	L	GF	GA	GD	Pts	Promotion
1	Croatia (H)	3	3	0	0	12	0	+12	9	Promoted to League A for the next season's qualification
2	North Macedonia	3	1	1	1	2	3	−1	4	
3	Lithuania	3	1	0	2	4	6	−2	3	
4	Armenia	3	0	1	2	2	11	−9	1	

Source: www.sofascore.com
Rules for classification: Tiebreakers
(H) Hosts
1 April 2025
12:30

Armenia	0–6	Croatia
	Report	Yeritsyan 2' (o.g.); Petković 5', 58'; Prkačin 38'; Gavrić 55'; Grdiša 84'

Stadion Branko Čavlović-Čavlek, Karlovac
Referee: Karoline Marie Jensen (Norway)
1 April 2025
16:30

North Macedonia	1–0	Lithuania
Šapaitė 90+2' (o.g.)	Report

Stadion Lučko, Lučko
Referee: Marisca Overtoom (The Netherlands)

4 April 2025
12:30

Croatia	4–0	Lithuania
Andriuškevičiūtė 16' (o.g.); Petković 30', 34'; Kolčić 52'	Report

Stadion Branko Čavlović-Čavlek, Karlovac
Referee: Karoline Marie Jensen (Norway)
4 April 2025
16:30

North Macedonia	1–1	Armenia
Ilievska 63'	Report	Sayadyan 67'

Stadion Lučko, Lučko
Referee: Joanna Vassallo (Malta)

7 April 2025
12:30

Croatia	2–0	North Macedonia
Veseli 13'; Petković 74'	Report

Stadion Branko Čavlović-Čavlek, Karlovac
Referee: Joanna Vassallo (Malta)
7 April 2025
12:30

Lithuania	4–1	Armenia
Petkevičiute 17', 83'; Streckytė 49'; Maželytė 78'	Report	Nersesian 80'

Stadion Lučko, Lučko
Referee: Marisca Overtoom (The Netherlands)

==== Group B6 ====
Pos	Team	Pld	W	D	L	GF	GA	GD	Pts	Promotion
1	Turkey	2	1	1	0	1	0	+1	4	Promoted to League A for the next season's qualification
2	Hungary (H)	2	1	0	1	2	2	0	3	
3	Bosnia and Herzegovina	2	0	1	1	1	2	−1	1	

Source: www.sofascore.com
Rules for classification: Tiebreakers
(H) Hosts
2 April 2025
15:00

Hungary	0–1	Turkey
	Report	Temel 59'

Globall Football Park, Telki
Referee: Louise Thompson (Northern Ireland)

5 April 2025
15:00

Turkey	0–0	Bosnia and Herzegovina
	Report

Globall Football Park, Telki
Referee: Rita Vehapi (Kosovo)

8 April 2025
15:00

Bosnia and Herzegovina	1–2	Hungary
Brnić 66'	Report	Németh 31'; Koszo 43'

Globall Football Park, Telki
Referee: Briet Bragadottir (Iceland)

==== Ranking of second-placed teams ====
To determine the best runner-up team, only the results of the runner-up teams against the first- and third-placed teams in their group were taken into account (Regulations Article 18.01).

Pos	Grp	Team	Pld	W	D	L	GF	GA	GD	Pts	Promotion
1	B2	Estonia	2	1	1	0	4	2	+2	4	Promoted to League A for the next season's qualification
2	B6	Hungary	2	1	0	1	2	2	0	3	
3	B5	North Macedonia	2	1	0	1	1	2	−1	3	
4	B4	Montenegro	2	1	0	1	2	4	−2	3	
5	B1	Luxembourg	2	0	1	1	1	4	−3	1	
6	B3	Latvia	2	0	1	1	1	5	−4	1	

Source: UEFA
Rules for classification: 1) points; 2) goal difference; 3) goals scored; 4) disciplinary points; 5) position in the applicable rankings.

== Qualified teams ==
Team	Method of qualification	Appearance	Last appearance	Previous best performance
Poland	Hosts	2nd	2007 (Group stage)	Group stage (2007)
Netherlands	Round 2 Group A1 winners	13th	2024 (Runners-up)	Champions (2014)
Portugal	Round 2 Group A2 winners	2nd	2012 (Semi-finals)	Semi-finals (2012)
England	Round 2 Group A3 winners	16th	2024 (Semi-finals)	Champions (2009)
Italy	Round 2 Group A4 winners	9th	2022 (Group stage)	Champions (2008)
Spain	Round 2 Group A5 winners	18th	2024 (Champions)	Champions (2004, 2017, 2018, 2022, 2023, 2024)
France	Round 2 Group A6 winners	19th	2024 (Semi-finals)	Champions (2003, 2010, 2013, 2016, 2019)
Sweden	Round 2 best runners-up	14th	2022 (Semi-finals)	Champions (1999, 2012, 2015)

== Goalscorers ==
In the Round 1, there have been 276 goals scored in 75 matches, for an average of 3.68 goals per match (as of 3 December 2024).

In the Round 2, there have been 265 goals scored in 75 matches, for an average of 3.53 goals per match (as of 8 April 2025).

In total, there have been 541 goals scored in 150 matches, for an average of 3.61 goals per match (as of 8 April 2025).

8 goals

- (Belarus) Anastasiya Kavaliova

7 goals

- (Netherlands) Jade van Hensbergen
- (Scotland) Laura Berry

6 goals

- (Estonia) Anželika Jotkina
- (Faroe Islands) Brá Zakariasardóttir
- (Sweden) Felicia Schröder

5 goals

- (Albania) Xhesika Ndoj
- (Austria) Almedina Sisic
- (Belarus) Veranika Kaliuta
- (Bulgaria) Mariela Petrova
- (Croatia) Paula Petković
- (Finland) Tilda Råtts
- (Romania) Ioana Stancu
- (Wales) Olivia Francis

4 goals

- (Belgium) Jolien Verhoeven
- (Bulgaria) Polina Demirova
- (England) Princess Ademiluyi
- (England) Ava Baker
- (France) Maeline Mendy
- (Italy) Carolina Tironi
- (Italy) Marta Zamboni
- (Kosovo) Elona Paci
- (Spain) Daniela Agote
- (Spain) Celia Segura

3 goals

- (Albania) Rosela Vasa
- (Croatia) Ivana Vlajčević
- (Cyprus) Antriana Tsoukka
- (Denmark) Alma Aagaard
- (England) Lola Brown
- (England) Jessie Gale
- (England) Vivienne Lia
- (Faroe Islands) Sólja Ernstsdóttir
- (Finland) Olivia Ulenius
- (France) Chancelle Effa Effa
- (France) Liana Joseph
- (France) Mélinda Mendy
- (France) Justine Rouquet
- (France) Julie Swierot
- (Georgia (country)) Lizi Kankia
- (Germany) Estrella Merino Gonzalez
- (Germany) Melina Krüger
- (Germany) Maj Schneider
- (Greece) Konstantina Platania
- (Italy) Giada Pellegrino Cimò
- (Italy) Rosanna Ventriglia
- (Kazakhstan) Nazym Aldanazar
- (Kosovo) Olsa Maqastena
- (Luxembourg) Vera Villegas
- (Netherlands) Rose Ivens
- (Northern Ireland) Niamh Boothroyd
- (Northern Ireland) Aimee Kerr
- (Poland) Julia Gutowska
- (Republic of Ireland) Kiera Sena
- (Spain) Alba Cerrato
- (Spain) Pau Cubarsí
- (Spain) Lorena Cubo
- (Spain) Marisa García
- (Spain) Ainoa Gómez
- (Spain) Cris Librán
- (Switzerland) Janina Egli

2 goals

- (Austria) Sarah Gutmann
- (Belarus) Kseniya Yatsynovich
- (Bosnia and Herzegovina) Tasneem Dizdarević
- (Bosnia and Herzegovina) Nina Garibija
- (Croatia) Ana Grdiša
- (Cyprus) Sophia Victoria Mcbeth
- (Denmark) Therese Vestermark
- (England) Michelle Agyemang
- (Faroe Islands) Eydna Dalheim
- (Faroe Islands) Helga Mikkelsen
- (France) Naolia Traoré
- (Georgia (country)) Nino Bukhrikidze
- (Germany) Delice Boboy
- (Germany) Rosa Rückert
- (Italy) Eleonora Ferraresi
- (Italy) Manuela Perselli
- (Italy) Elena Pizzuti
- (Italy) Manuela Sciabica
- (Kazakhstan) Alina Lozukova
- (Kazakhstan) Valeriya Popova
- (Latvia) Paula Dzene
- (Latvia) Kristiāna Punga
- (Lithuania) Austėja Petkevičiute
- (Luxembourg) Lena Alves
- (Luxembourg) Beatriz Silva Moreira
- (Montenegro) Katarina Čađenović
- (Montenegro) Vlada Milović
- (Netherlands) Bo van Egmond
- (Netherlands) Mirte van Koppen
- (Netherlands) Suus Verdaasdonk
- (Netherlands) Christina Weiman
- (Northern Ireland) Gracie Conway
- (Norway) Carina Wik Alfredsen
- (Poland) Julia Langosz
- (Poland) Magda Piekarska
- (Poland) Inez Sikora
- (Portugal) Leonete Correia
- (Portugal) Diana Costa
- (Portugal) Neide Guedes
- (Portugal) Anna Marques
- (Portugal) Carolina Santiago
- (Romania) Alexia Niculescu
- (Scotland) Fallon Connolly-Jackson
- (Serbia) Ana Nikolić
- (Serbia) Jelena Tešnjak
- (Slovakia) Tamara Kramlíková
- (Slovakia) Sára Straková
- (Slovenia) Katjuša Kern
- (Slovenia) Sara Medić
- (Spain) Clara Serrajordi
- (Switzerland) Leela Egli
- (Switzerland) Lia Kamber
- (Switzerland) Emilie Mece
- (Switzerland) Aida Ragusa
- (Switzerland) Leila Wandeler
- (Turkey) Sara Temel
- (Ukraine) Lidiia Zaborovets
- (Wales) Teagan Scarlett

1 goal

- (Albania) Adela Valerie Qose
- (Albania) Stela Vata
- (Armenia) Milena Sayadyan
- (Austria) Cynthia Chidiebere Adamu
- (Austria) Ella Herbst
- (Austria) Lara Höcherl
- (Austria) Valentina Illinger
- (Austria) Sophie Rapf
- (Azerbaijan) Aysel Ziyadova
- (Belarus) Valeryia Imkhovik
- (Belarus) Hanna Putsykovich
- (Belarus) Hanna Siniauskaya
- (Belgium) Lise Bal
- (Belgium) Flo Hermans
- (Belgium) Léna Hubaut
- (Belgium) Emma Priem
- (Bosnia and Herzegovina) Dalal Bratović
- (Bosnia and Herzegovina) Nina Brnić
- (Bosnia and Herzegovina) Una Rankić
- (Bulgaria) Viktoria Genova
- (Bulgaria) Elena Kamenova
- (Bulgaria) Silvia Naydenova
- (Croatia) Mia Gavrić
- (Croatia) Lea Kolčić
- (Croatia) Gabrijela Prkačin
- (Croatia) Stela Veseli
- (Cyprus) Andrea Cusick
- (Cyprus) Sophia Krys Mylona
- (Cyprus) Artemis Petkovski
- (Czech Republic) Radka Jakubů
- (Czech Republic) Lucie Krejčová
- (Czech Republic) Karolína Krůtová
- (Czech Republic) Adéla Trachtová
- (Denmark) Signe Antvorskov
- (Denmark) Flora Højer
- (Denmark) Josefine Valvik
- (England) Lily Dent
- (England) Laila Harbert
- (England) Lucy Newell
- (England) Katie Reid
- (Estonia) Anna Mariin Juksar
- (Estonia) Aleksandra Kelli
- (Estonia) Tania Komarovskiy
- (Estonia) Egle-Eliise Kurg
- (Estonia) Jane Mirjam
- (Estonia) Annamarii Tamm
- (Estonia) Karmen Vapper
- (Finland) Aada Mäkelä
- (France) Kentissia Bacoul-Juillard
- (France) Almudena Sierra
- (Georgia (country)) Niniko Chkhetiani
- (Georgia (country)) Lizi Gogaladze
- (Georgia (country)) Sophie Khelashvili
- (Georgia (country)) Keso Metonidze
- (Germany) Greta Hünten
- (Germany) Laila Portella
- (Germany) Leonie Schetter
- (Germany) Marina Scholz
- (Greece) Argyro Fakinou
- (Greece) Maria Eleni Mougiou
- (Greece) Ilektra Tzourtzevits
- (Hungary) Sydney Koszo
- (Hungary) Virág Gabriella Németh
- (Hungary) Napsugár Sinka
- (Iceland) Líf Joostdóttir Van Bemme
- (Iceland) Hrafnhildur Ása Halldórsdóttir
- (Iceland) Hrefna Jónsdóttir
- (Iceland) Ragnheiður Þórunn Jónsdóttir
- (Iceland) Bergdís Sveinsdóttir
- (Iceland) Ísabella Tryggvadóttir
- (Israel) Orian Biru
- (Israel) Michaelit Workou
- (Italy) Paola Fadda
- (Italy) Sofia Testa
- (Kazakhstan) Zhansezim Aissapar
- (Kazakhstan) Adina Beibut
- (Kosovo) Sahare Berisha
- (Kosovo) Riga Kallaba
- (Kosovo) Ramize Orana
- (Kosovo) Alba Shabani
- (Kosovo) Besjana Zogaj
- (Latvia) Alīna Ansone
- (Latvia) Rendija Baltrušaite
- (Latvia) Felicita Cīrule
- (Latvia) Evelīna Jaunslaviete
- (Latvia) Uma Upīte
- (Lithuania) Kotryna Maželytė
- (Lithuania) Atėnė Streckytė
- (Luxembourg) Jeanne Marie Berdy
- (Luxembourg) Sofia Borruso
- (Luxembourg) Eva Marinelli
- (Luxembourg) Gwendy Merlevede
- (Luxembourg) Anna Miny
- (Luxembourg) Djalissa Da Veiga Moreira
- (Luxembourg) Charlotte Schmit
- (Malta) Lara May Azzopardi
- (Malta) Fatma Al Girbi
- (Moldova) Milena Tihonciuc
- (Montenegro) Dunja Bojanić
- (Montenegro) Nađa Doknić
- (Montenegro) Jelena Nikčević
- (Montenegro) Jelena Radevic
- (Montenegro) Maša Tomašević
- (Montenegro) Tatjana Osmajić
- (Netherlands) Eva Oude Elberink
- (Netherlands) Sophie van Vugt
- (Netherlands) Aline Weerelts
- (Netherlands) Zoë Zuidberg
- (Northern Ireland) Bernadette Ferreira
- (Northern Ireland) Sophie Gargan
- (Northern Ireland) Faye Loughran
- (Northern Ireland) Sophie Keenan
- (Northern Ireland) Clodagh Maguire
- (Northern Ireland) Abi Sweetlove
- (North Macedonia) Anastasia Ilievska
- (Norway) Andrea Buberg
- (Norway) Frøya Dorsin
- (Norway) Anny Kerim-Lindland
- (Norway) Emilie Sofie Ludvigsen
- (Norway) Anna Nigårdsøy
- (Norway) Kajsa Bjerga Pettersen
- (Norway) Ida Warvik
- (Poland) Aleksandra Bogucka
- (Poland) Krystyna Flis
- (Poland) Zuzanna Grzywińska
- (Poland) Paulina Guzik
- (Poland) Oliwia Łapińska
- (Poland) Gabriela Lewicka
- (Poland) Zuzanna Witek
- (Poland) Kinga Wyrwas
- (Poland) Maja Zielińska
- (Portugal) Dária Kaminska
- (Portugal) Lara Martins
- (Republic of Ireland) Aoibhe Brennan
- (Republic of Ireland) Jessica Fitzgerald
- (Republic of Ireland) Hannah Healy
- (Republic of Ireland) Lia O'Leary
- (Romania) Brooklyn Eva Menard
- (Romania) Jasmine Ouatu
- (Romania) Elisa-Andrea Savu
- (Romania) Iulia Șova
- (Romania) Eszter Szoke
- (Romania) Georgiana Trandafir
- (Romania) Nicol Dincă Vuia
- (Scotland) Lisa Forrest
- (Scotland) Brodie Greenwood
- (Scotland) Eloise Morran
- (Serbia) Mina Čingelić
- (Serbia) Tara Kocic
- (Serbia) Milica Maljković
- (Serbia) Anđela Milovanović
- (Serbia) Maša Ninković
- (Serbia) Nadja Uvalin
- (Slovakia) Simona Horváthová
- (Slovakia) Matilda Sluková
- (Slovenia) Lea Dolinar
- (Slovenia) Špela Gerbec
- (Slovenia) Ana Marija Kršljin
- (Slovenia) Zala Omerza
- (Slovenia) Ula Omerzu
- (Slovenia) Varja Špiler
- (Slovenia) Tinkara Testen
- (Slovenia) Neža Trost
- (Spain) Daniela Arques
- (Spain) Noemí Bejarano
- (Spain) Emma Moreno Torres
- (Sweden) Bianca Hultbäck
- (Sweden) Novalie Jensen
- (Sweden) Alexandra Larsson
- (Sweden) Hannah Sjödahl
- (Sweden) Mikaela Stojanovska
- (Switzerland) Bianca Dysli
- (Switzerland) Alyssa Keller
- (Switzerland) Anja Klingenstein
- (Switzerland) Nevia Stoob
- (Ukraine) Maryna Ptytsyna
- (Ukraine) Anastasiia Stakhniuk
- (Wales) Ffion Bowen
- (Wales) Emily Cole
- (Wales) Mared Griffiths
- (Wales) Charlotte Lee
- (Wales) Charlotte Salisbury-Williams

1 own goal

- (Armenia) Rozalina Yeritsyan (against Croatia)
- (Belgium) Fleur Heyman (against Spain)
- (Estonia) Viktoria Toding (against Switzerland)
- (Kosovo) Liza Hoxha (against Denmark)
- (Lithuania) Aivė Andriuškevičiūtė (against Croatia)
- (Lithuania) Jotvilė Šapaitė (against North Macedonia)
- (Malta) Ema Micallef (against Slovenia)
- (Moldova) Dina Burac (against Albania)
- (Serbia) Aleksandra Gajić (against Austria)
- (Slovakia) Mária Gunišová (against Portugal)
- (Turkey) Azra Tiraş (against Italy)
