= Moldova women's national under-19 football team =

Moldova Women's U-19
- Association: FMF
- Confederation: UEFA (Europe)
- Head coach: Alexandra Bocancea
- FIFA code: MDA
First colours	Second colours

First international
- Official: Turkey 7–1 Moldova (Adapazarı, Turkey; 11 May 1999)

Biggest win
- Moldova 5–1 Estonia (Bijeljina, Bosnia and Herzegovina; 8 October 2022)

Biggest defeat
- Russia 19–0 Moldova (Sarajevo, Bosnia and Herzegovina; 25 September 2008)

The Moldova women's national under-19 football team represents Moldova in international football at this age level and is controlled by the Moldovan Football Federation, the governing body for football in Moldova. The team is considered to be the feeder team for the senior Moldovan women's national football team. The team competes to qualify for the UEFA Women's Under-19 Championship held every year. Since the establishment of the Moldovan women's under-19 team, the under-19 side has never reached a final tournament of the UEFA Women's Under-19 Championship but has produced many players who have become regular internationals for the senior side. Players born on or after 1 January 2008 are eligible for the 2027 UEFA Women's Under-19 Championship qualification. They are currently coached by Alexandra Bocancea.

== Competition history ==
Starting with qualification for the 2002 tournament, the competition was renamed from Under-18 Championship to Under-19 Championship, but the eligibility rules did not change.

=== UEFA U-18/19 European Championship ===
Under-18 era, 2000–2001
Under-19 era, 2002–present

Hosted tournament Hosted qualifying

UEFA U-18/19 European Championship record										UEFA U-18/19 Qualification record								
Year	Round	Pld	W	D	L	GF	GA	GD	Squad	Pld	W	D	L	GF	GA	GD	Campaign	
(France) 2000	Did not qualify									5	1	1	3	6	33	−27	2000	2000
(Norway) 2001	Did not qualify									2	0	0	2	0	9	−9	2001	
(Sweden) 2002	Did not enter									—							—	
(Germany) 2003	Did not qualify									3	0	0	3	0	9	−9	2003	
(Finland) 2004	Did not enter									—							—	
(Hungary) 2005	Did not qualify									6	1	0	5	4	29	−25	2005	2005
(Switzerland) 2006	Did not qualify									3	0	0	3	1	8	−7	2006	
(Iceland) 2007	Did not qualify									3	0	0	3	0	19	−19	2007	
(France) 2008	Did not qualify									3	0	0	3	0	30	−30	2008	
(Belarus) 2009	Did not qualify									3	0	0	3	0	36	−36	2009	
(North Macedonia) 2010	Did not qualify									3	0	0	3	0	13	−13	2010	
(Italy) 2011	Did not qualify									3	1	0	2	2	8	−6	2011	
(Turkey) 2012	Did not qualify									3	0	0	3	0	14	−14	2012	
(Wales) 2013	Did not qualify									3	0	1	2	1	17	−16	2013	
(Norway) 2014	Did not qualify									3	0	1	2	3	9	−6	2014	
(Israel) 2015	Did not qualify									3	1	1	1	4	6	−2	2015	
(Slovakia) 2016	Did not qualify									3	1	0	2	2	22	−20	2016	
(Northern Ireland) 2017	Did not qualify									3	0	0	3	0	6	−6	2017	
(Switzerland) 2018	Did not qualify									3	0	0	3	0	21	−21	2018	
(Scotland) 2019	Did not qualify									3	0	0	3	1	17	−16	2019	
(Georgia (country)) ~~2020~~	Did not qualify									3	0	0	3	0	17	−17	2020	
(Czech Republic) 2022	Did not qualify									6	1	1	4	5	11	−6	2022	2022
(Belgium) 2023	Did not qualify									5	2	1	2	10	11	−1	2023	2023
(Lithuania) 2024	Did not qualify									6	0	1	5	1	19	−18	2024	2024
(Poland) 2025	Did not qualify									6	0	0	6	1	33	−32	2025	2025
(Bosnia and Herzegovina) 2026	Did not qualify									6	0	1	5	1	36	−35	2026	2026
(Hungary) 2027	In progress									0	0	0	0	0	0	0	2027	
(Portugal) 2028	To be determined									To be determined								
(Italy) 2029	To be determined									To be determined								
Total	0/24									90	8	8	74	42	433	−391		

== 2027 UEFA Women's Under-19 Championship ==
=== Round 1 (League B) ===
Pos	Team	Pld	W	D	L	GF	GA	GD	Pts	Promotion
1	Latvia	0	0	0	0	0	0	0	0	Promotion to Round 2 (League A)
2	Albania (H)	0	0	0	0	0	0	0	0	Transfer to Round 2 (League B)
3	Cyprus	0	0	0	0	0	0	0	0	Transfer to Round 2 (League B)
4	Moldova	0	0	0	0	0	0	0	0	Transfer to Round 2 (League B)

First match(es) will be played: 27 November 2026. Source: UEFA
(H) Hosts
27 November 2026

Latvia	v	Moldova
	Report

Niko Dovana, Durrës

30 November 2026

Albania	v	Moldova
	Report

House of Football, Tirana

3 December 2026

Moldova	v	Cyprus
	Report

Egnatia Arena, Rrogozhinë

== 2026 UEFA Women's Under-19 Championship ==
=== Round 1 (League B) ===
Pos	Team	Pld	W	D	L	GF	GA	GD	Pts	Promotion
1	Hungary	3	3	0	0	15	1	+14	9	Promotion to Round 2 (League A)
2	Czechia (H)	3	2	0	1	16	3	+13	6	Transfer to Round 2 (League B)
3	Lithuania	3	1	0	2	7	10	−3	3	Transfer to Round 2 (League B)
4	Moldova	3	0	0	3	0	24	−24	0	Transfer to Round 2 (League B)

Source: UEFA
(H) Hosts
21 October 2025

Czechia	10–0	Moldova
Trachtová 2', 3'; Bartošová 13'; Balázsová 17', 21'; Tichá 33'; Boháčová 49'; Kroupová 71', 90', 90+5'	Report

Letní stadion, Chomutov
Referee: Frederikke Lydia Sökjaer (Denmark)

24 October 2025

Hungary	7–0	Moldova
Gégény 13', 36'; Turi 15'; Gágyor 17'; Pethe 53'; Vincze 63', 77'	Report

Chmel stadium, Blšany
Referee: Katarzyna Lisiecka-Sęk (Poland)

27 October 2025

Moldova	0–7	Lithuania
	Report	Tamošauskaitė 16'; Kairytė 28', 45+5'; Kiškūnaitė 45', 67'; Blaževičūtė 49'; Pocevičiūtė 76'

Chmel stadium, Blšany
Referee: Frederikke Lydia Sökjaer (Denmark)

=== Round 2 (League B) ===
Pos	Team	Pld	W	D	L	GF	GA	GD	Pts	Promotion
1	Kosovo	3	2	0	1	11	3	+8	6	Promotion to League A for the next tournament qualification
2	Faroe Islands	3	2	0	1	10	6	+4	6	
3	Lithuania (H)	3	1	1	1	3	4	−1	4	
4	Moldova	3	0	1	2	1	12	−11	1	

Source: UEFA
(H) Hosts
12 April 2026

Kosovo	6–0	Moldova
Januzi 14'; Meha 32', 60'; Emelina 78' (o.g.); Lecaj 86'; Sinani 88'	Report

Raudondvaris Stadium, Raudondvaris
Referee: Farida Lutfaliyeva (Azerbaijan)

15 April 2026

Faroe Islands	5–0	Moldova
Benjaminsen 16' (pen.), 76', 90+3'; Sigurðsson 50'; Mohr 56'	Report

Raudondvaris Stadium, Raudondvaris
Referee: Bríet Bragadóttir (Iceland)

18 April 2026

Moldova	1–1	Lithuania
Kleyner 30'	Report	Kiškūnaitė 50' (pen.)

Raudondvaris Stadium, Raudondvaris
Referee: Farida Lutfaliyeva (Azerbaijan)

== Head-to-head record ==
Friendly games are not included and correct as of last competitive match played on 18 April 2026.

Opponents	Pld	W	D	L	GF	GA	GD
Albania	2	0	1	1	0	3	−3
Andorra	2	1	0	1	1	1	0
Armenia	1	1	0	0	2	0	+2
Austria	0	0	0	0	0	0	0
Azerbaijan	1	0	1	0	0	0	0
Belarus	3	1	0	2	2	13	−11
Belgium	0	0	0	0	0	0	0
Bosnia and Herzegovina	4	0	0	4	2	18	−16
Bulgaria	1	0	0	1	0	1	−1
Croatia	0	0	0	0	0	0	0
Cyprus	2	1	0	1	2	6	−4
Czechia	2	0	0	2	1	13	−12
Denmark	2	0	0	2	0	16	−16
England	3	0	0	3	0	23	−23
Estonia	2	1	0	1	6	4	+2
Faroe Islands	5	0	2	3	4	20	−16
Finland	4	0	0	4	0	17	−17
France	1	0	0	1	0	9	−9
Georgia	0	0	0	0	0	0	0
Germany	0	0	0	0	0	0	0
Gibraltar	0	0	0	0	0	0	0
Greece	1	0	0	1	0	3	−3
Hungary	4	0	0	4	0	21	−21
Iceland	2	0	0	2	0	8	−8
Ireland	1	0	1	0	1	1	0
Israel	0	0	0	0	0	0	0
Italy	3	0	0	3	0	22	−22
Kazakhstan	0	0	0	0	0	0	0
Kosovo	2	0	0	2	0	9	−9
Latvia	0	0	0	0	0	0	0
Liechtenstein	1	1	0	0	3	1	+2
Lithuania	4	0	2	2	3	12	−9
Luxembourg	0	0	0	0	0	0	0
Malta	0	0	0	0	0	0	0
Montenegro	2	1	0	1	3	7	−4
Netherlands	3	0	0	3	0	27	−27
North Macedonia	3	0	0	3	2	10	−8
Northern Ireland	1	0	0	1	0	6	−6
Norway	3	0	0	3	1	29	−28
Poland	0	0	0	0	0	0	0
Portugal	0	0	0	0	0	0	0
Romania	1	0	0	1	0	4	−4
Russia	1	0	0	1	0	19	−19
San Marino	0	0	0	0	0	0	0
Scotland	1	0	0	1	0	5	−5
Serbia	0	0	0	0	0	0	0
Slovakia	1	0	1	0	1	1	0
Slovenia	4	1	0	3	4	15	−11
Spain	1	0	0	1	0	8	−8
Sweden	1	0	0	1	0	3	−3
Switzerland	2	0	0	2	0	9	−9
Turkey	3	0	0	3	1	13	−12
Ukraine	4	0	0	4	3	25	−22
Wales	6	0	0	6	0	31	−31
Total	90	8	8	74	42	433	−391

== See also ==
- Moldova women's national football team
- Moldova women's national under-17 football team
