= 2003 UEFA Women's Under-19 Championship qualification =

Football tournament qualification stage

The qualification for the 2003 UEFA Women's Under-19 Championship were a series of association football matches between national teams to determine the participants of the 2003 Final Tournament held in Germany.

== First round ==
Germany qualified as hosts, while Norway, Spain, France, Italy, Czech Republic, Sweden, Denmark and Netherlands received byes to the second round. The remaining 28 teams were divided into 7 groups of four teams, with each group being contested as a mini-tournament, hosted by one of the group's teams. After all matches have been played, the 7 group winners and best runners-up advanced to the second round.

=== Group 1 ===
Pos	Team	Pld	W	D	L	GF	GA	GD	Pts	Qualification
1	Belgium	3	2	1	0	9	4	+5	7	Second round
2	Poland (H)	3	2	0	1	9	5	+4	6	
3	Iceland	3	1	1	1	5	7	−2	4	
4	Bosnia and Herzegovina	3	0	0	3	0	7	−7	0	

Source: UEFA (via Web Archive)
(H) Hosts

2 October 2002
Bosnia and Herzegovina	0–1	Iceland	Augustów
Poland	2–3	Belgium	Suwałki
4 October 2002
Belgium	4–0	Bosnia and Herzegovina	Olecko
Poland	5–2	Iceland	Augustów
6 October 2003
Iceland	2–2	Belgium	Suwałki
Poland	2–0	Bosnia and Herzegovina	Olecko

=== Group 2 ===
Pos	Team	Pld	W	D	L	GF	GA	GD	Pts	Qualification
1	Finland (H)	3	3	0	0	5	0	+5	9	Second round
2	Wales	3	2	0	1	7	2	+5	6	
3	Estonia	3	1	0	2	4	6	−2	3	
4	Turkey	3	0	0	3	0	8	−8	0	

Source: UEFA (via Web Archive)
(H) Hosts

2 October 2002
Finland	1–0	Turkey	Keuruu
Wales	4–0	Estonia	Keuruu
4 October 2002
Turkey	0–2	Wales	Keuruu
Finland	2–0	Estonia	Keuruu
6 October 2003
Estonia	4–0	Turkey	Haapamäki
Finland	2–0	Wales	Keuruu

=== Group 3 ===
Pos	Team	Pld	W	D	L	GF	GA	GD	Pts	Qualification
1	Switzerland	3	3	0	0	25	2	+23	9	Second round
2	Hungary	3	2	0	1	3	6	−3	6	
3	Greece (H)	3	1	0	2	6	17	−11	3	
4	Moldova	3	0	0	3	0	9	−9	0	

Source: UEFA (via Web Archive)
(H) Hosts

2 October 2002
Moldova	0–5	Switzerland	Lamia
Greece	1–2	Hungary	Stylida
4 October 2002
Greece	2–15	Switzerland	Stylida
Hungary	1–0	Moldova	Lamia
6 October 2003
Greece	3–0	Moldova	Lamia
Switzerland	5–0	Hungary	Stylida

=== Group 4 ===
Pos	Team	Pld	W	D	L	GF	GA	GD	Pts	Qualification
1	Republic of Ireland	3	2	0	1	5	4	+1	6	Second round
2	FR Yugoslavia	3	1	1	1	5	5	0	4	
3	Portugal (H)	3	1	1	1	4	5	−1	4	
4	Austria	3	1	0	2	6	6	0	3	

Source: UEFA (via Web Archive)
(H) Hosts

2 October 2002
Austria	1–2	FR Yugoslavia	Óbidos
Portugal	1–0	Republic of Ireland	Óbidos
4 October 2002
Portugal	2–2	FR Yugoslavia	Caldas da Rainha
Republic of Ireland	3–2	Austria	Caldas da Rainha
6 October 2003
FR Yugoslavia	1–2	Republic of Ireland	Nazaré
Portugal	1–3	Austria	Óbidos

=== Group 5 ===
Pos	Team	Pld	W	D	L	GF	GA	GD	Pts	Qualification
1	England	3	3	0	0	14	1	+13	9	Second round
2	Faroe Islands	3	1	1	1	4	6	−2	4	
3	Lithuania	3	1	0	2	4	6	−2	3	
4	Bulgaria (H)	3	0	1	2	1	10	−9	1	

Source: UEFA (via Web Archive)
(H) Hosts

2 October 2002
Lithuania	0–4	England	Albena
Bulgaria	1–1	Faroe Islands	Albena
4 October 2002
Faroe Islands	2–0	Lithuania	Albena
Bulgaria	0–5	England	Albena
6 October 2003
England	5–1	Faroe Islands	Albena
Bulgaria	0–4	Lithuania	Albena

=== Group 6 ===
Group matches were due to be held in Israel, but were moved to Albena, Bulgaria, because of the ongoing security situation in Israel.

Pos	Team	Pld	W	D	L	GF	GA	GD	Pts	Qualification
1	Scotland	3	3	0	0	8	2	+6	9	Second round
2	Russia	3	2	0	1	7	3	+4	6	
3	Israel	3	1	0	2	4	5	−1	3	
4	Northern Ireland	3	0	0	3	0	9	−9	0	

Source: UEFA (via Web Archive)

12 October 2002
Russia	2–1	Israel	Albena
Scotland	3–0	Northern Ireland	Albena
14 October 2002
Russia	4–0	Northern Ireland	Albena
Israel	1–3	Scotland	Albena
16 October 2003
Scotland	2–1	Russia	Albena
Northern Ireland	0–2	Israel	Albena

=== Group 7 ===
Pos	Team	Pld	W	D	L	GF	GA	GD	Pts	Qualification
1	Ukraine	3	2	1	0	19	2	+17	7	Second round
2	Slovakia (H)	3	2	1	0	10	4	+6	7	Second round
3	Slovenia	3	1	0	2	3	14	−11	3	
4	Belarus	3	0	0	3	0	12	−12	0	

Source: UEFA (via Web Archive)
(H) Hosts

2 October 2002
Slovakia	2–2	Ukraine	Turčianske Teplice
Slovenia	1–0	Belarus	Žabokreky
4 October 2002
Ukraine	8–0	Slovenia	Turčianske Teplice
Slovakia	5–0	Belarus	Žabokreky
6 October 2003
Belarus	0–9	Ukraine	Turčianske Teplice
Slovakia	6–2	Slovenia	Žabokreky

=== Ranking of second-placed teams ===
To determine the best second-placed teams from the qualifying round, all the results of the second-placed teams were taken into account.

The following criteria are applied to determine the rankings:

1. higher number of points obtained in these matches
2. superior goal difference from these matches
3. higher number of goals scored in these matches
4. fair play conduct of the teams in all group matches in the second qualifying round
5. drawing of lots

Grp	Team	Pld	W	D	L	GF	GA	GD	Pts
7	Slovakia	3	2	1	0	10	4	+6	7
2	Wales	3	2	0	1	7	2	+5	6
1	Poland	3	2	0	1	9	5	+4	6
6	Russia	3	2	0	1	7	3	+4	6
3	Hungary	3	2	0	1	3	6	−3	6
4	FR Yugoslavia	3	1	1	1	5	5	0	4
5	Faroe Islands	3	1	1	1	4	6	−2	4

== Second round ==
The 16 teams were drawn into four groups of four. The teams then played each other once. After that the group winners and the best three runners-up advanced to the final tournament.

The draw was held on 5 November 2002 in Nyon.

=== Group 1 ===
Pos	Team	Pld	W	D	L	GF	GA	GD	Pts	Qualification
1	Spain	3	2	1	0	8	3	+5	7	Final tournament
2	England (H)	3	2	1	0	5	1	+4	7	Final tournament
3	Republic of Ireland	3	1	0	2	2	6	−4	3	
4	Denmark	3	0	0	3	1	6	−5	0	

Source: UEFA (via Web Archive)
(H) Hosts

15 April 2003
Denmark	1–4	Spain	Bedford
England	3–0	Republic of Ireland	Cardington
17 April 2003
Republic of Ireland	1–0	Denmark	Arlesey
England	1–1	Spain	Arlesey
19 April 2003
Spain	3–1	Republic of Ireland	Cardington
England	1–0	Denmark	Barton-le-Clay

=== Group 2 ===
Pos	Team	Pld	W	D	L	GF	GA	GD	Pts	Qualification
1	Sweden	3	2	1	0	4	2	+2	7	Final tournament
2	France	3	2	0	1	4	2	+2	6	Final tournament
3	Switzerland (H)	3	1	1	1	3	3	0	4	
4	Finland	3	0	0	3	0	4	−4	0	

Source: UEFA (via Web Archive)
(H) Hosts

15 April 2003
Switzerland	2–0	Finland	Nyon
France	1–2	Sweden	Lausanne
17 April 2003
Finland	0–1	France	Nyon
Switzerland	1–1	Sweden	Vevey
19 April 2003
Switzerland	0–2	France	Lausanne
Sweden	1–0	Finland	Vevey

=== Group 3 ===
Pos	Team	Pld	W	D	L	GF	GA	GD	Pts	Qualification
1	Italy	3	3	0	0	10	2	+8	9	Final tournament
2	Netherlands (H)	3	2	0	1	5	2	+3	6	Final tournament
3	Ukraine	3	1	0	2	2	5	−3	3	
4	Slovakia	3	0	0	3	1	9	−8	0	

Source: UEFA (via Web Archive)
(H) Hosts

15 April 2003
Netherlands	0–2	Italy	Heerhugowaard
Slovakia	0–1	Ukraine	Heerhugowaard
17 April 2003
Italy	4–1	Slovakia	Delft
Netherlands	1–0	Ukraine	Delft
19 April 2003
Ukraine	1–4	Italy	Delft
Netherlands	4–0	Slovakia	Heerhugowaard

=== Group 4 ===
Pos	Team	Pld	W	D	L	GF	GA	GD	Pts	Qualification
1	Norway	3	2	1	0	4	1	+3	7	Final tournament
2	Belgium (H)	3	2	0	1	2	2	0	6	
3	Czech Republic	3	1	0	2	3	4	−1	3	
4	Scotland	3	0	1	2	3	5	−2	1	

Source: UEFA (via Web Archive)
(H) Hosts

15 April 2003
Belgium	1–0	Scotland	Oud-Heverlee
Norway	1–0	Czech Republic	Wavre
17 April 2003
Scotland	1–1	Norway	Oud-Heverlee
Belgium	1–0	Czech Republic	Wavre
19 April 2003
Belgium	0–2	Norway	Oud-Heverlee
Czech Republic	3–2	Scotland	Wavre

=== Ranking of second-placed teams ===
To determine the best second-placed team from the qualifying round, all of the results of the second-placed teams were taken into account.

Grp	Team	Pld	W	D	L	GF	GA	GD	Pts
1	England	3	2	1	0	5	1	+4	7
3	Netherlands	3	2	0	1	5	2	+3	6
2	France	3	2	0	1	4	2	+2	6
4	Belgium	3	2	0	1	2	2	0	6
