= Margit Kwao =

Faroese footballer (born 1992)

Personal information
- Full name: Margit Magnusdóttir Kwao
- Birth name: Margit Magnusdóttir
- Date of birth: 26 February 1992 (age 34)
- Position: Midfielder

Senior career*
Years	Team	Apps	(Gls)
- MB
- B36
- 07 Vestur

International career^{‡}
2008	Faroe Islands U17	2	(0)
2009–2010	Faroe Islands U19	6	(0)
2011	Faroe Islands	2	(0)
- * Club domestic league appearances and goals ‡ National team caps and goals as of 8 March 2011

Margit Magnusdóttir Kwao (née Magnusdóttir; born 26 February 1992) is a Faroese footballer who plays as a midfielder. She has been a member of the Faroe Islands women's national team. She is married to Miðvágs Bóltfelag midfielder Solomon A. Kwao, originally from Ghana, whom she has two children with.
