= Stal Rzeszów Municipal Stadium =

Stadium in Rzeszów, Poland

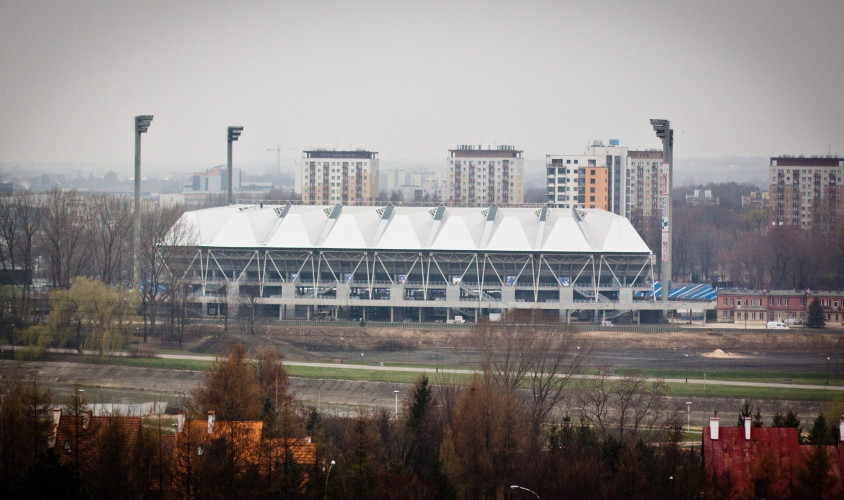
- The stadium (east stand) in 2012
- Location: Hetmańska 69, 35-078 Rzeszów, Poland
- Coordinates: 50°01′18″N 21°59′47″E
- Capacity: 12,000
- Opened: 1955
- Length: 0.395 km (0.245 mi)

The Stal Rzeszów Municipal Stadium (Polish: Stadion Miejski Stal w Rzeszowie) is a 12,000-capacity motorcycle speedway and association football stadium in the southern area of Rzeszów, Poland. The stadium staged the U-19 Women’s Euro final in 2025.

The venue is used by the speedway team Stal Rzeszów, who compete in the Team Speedway Polish Championship and the football clubs of Stal Rzeszów and Resovia.

== History ==
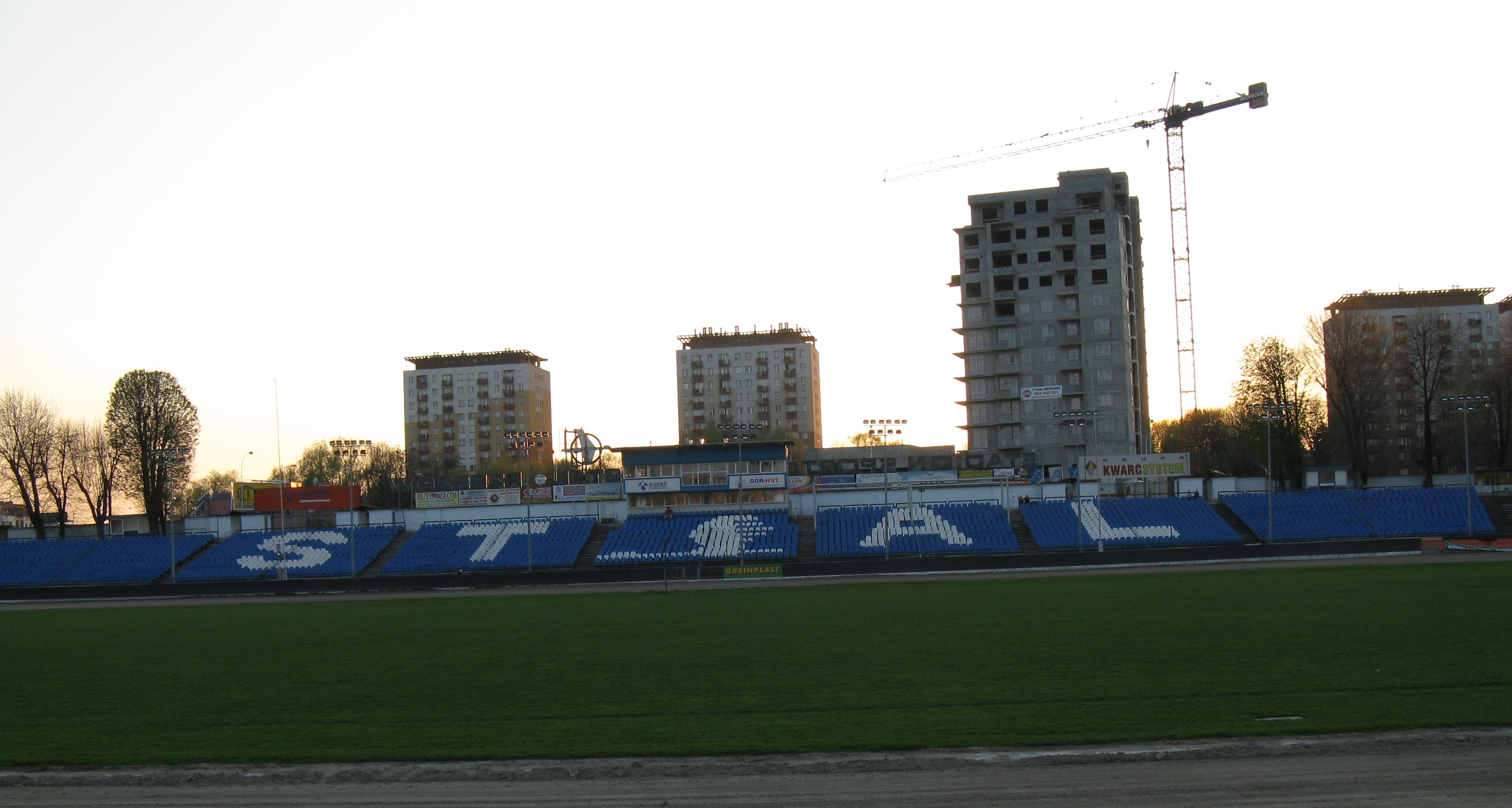
west stand in 2009

Speedway arrived at the stadium in 1955 following the construction of a track surrounding a pitch, with the first speedway match taking place on 22 May 1955. It was not until 2012 that major renovation began with a new east stand being built to add to the existing grandstand.

In 2006, the Rzeszów municipality took ownership of the stadium to enable further redevelopment projects. In 2011, a new 4,700-seater covered stand was built and further phases are planned to increase the capacity to an all–seater 20,150 capacity stadium. In 2025, the stadium hosted matches of the UEFA Women's Under-19 Championship, including the final.
