= Sweden national under-19 football team =

Sweden national under-19 football team might refer to:

- Sweden men's national under-19 football team
- Sweden women's national under-19 football team
