= Aiara Agirrezabala =

Spanish footballer (born 2008)

Personal information
- Full name: Aiara Agirrezabala
- Date of birth: 2 October 2008 (age 18)
- Place of birth: Berastegi, Spain
- Position: Defender

Team information
- Current team: Real Sociedad
- Number: 24

Senior career*
Years	Team	Apps	(Gls)
2024-	Real Sociedad	26	(6)
Medal record
Women's football
Representing Spain
UEFA Women's Under-19 Championship
Winner	2025 Poland
- * Club domestic league appearances and goals

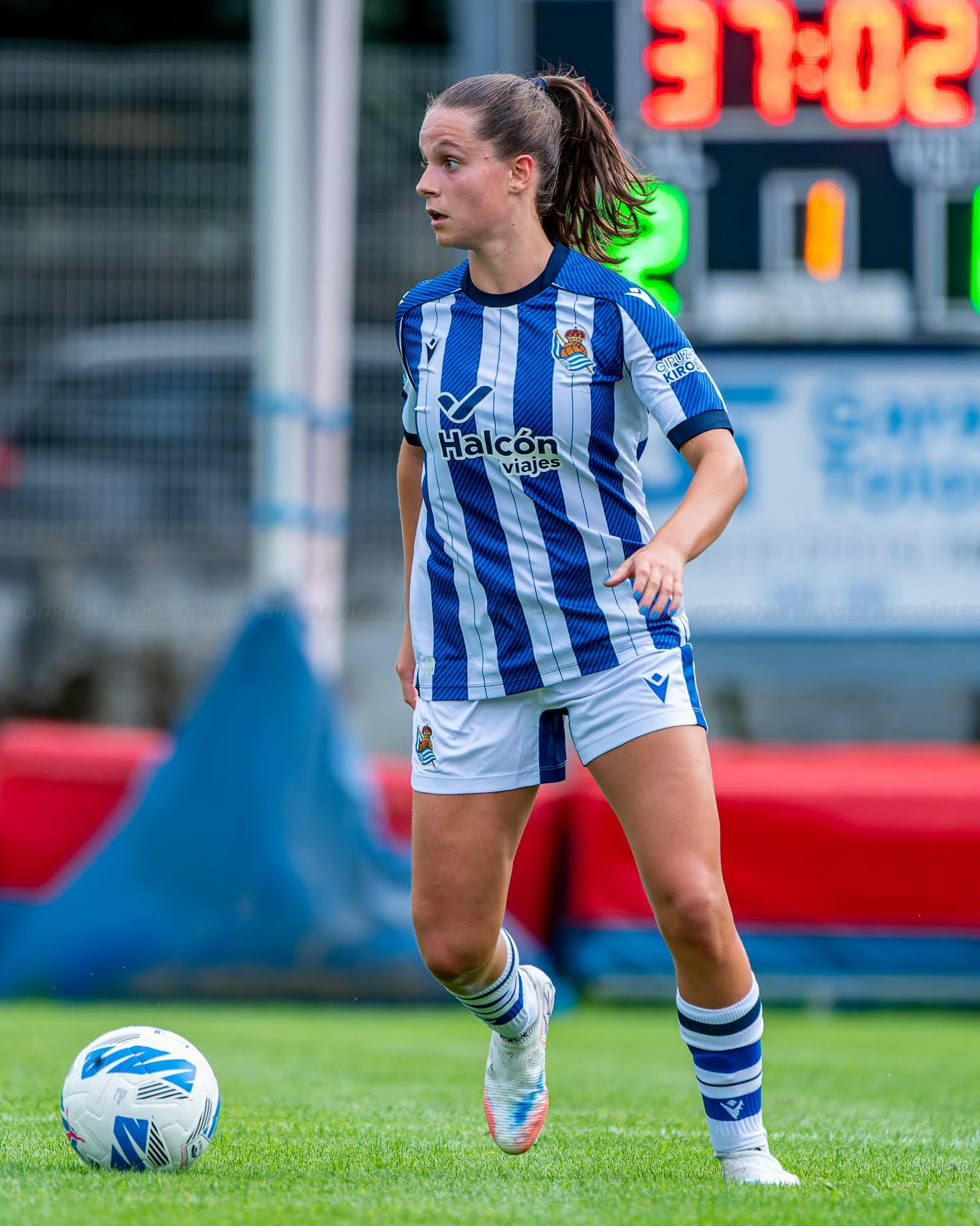
Aiara Aguirrezabala playing football

Aiara Agirrezabala (born 2 October 2008) is a Spanish footballer who plays as a defender for Real Sociedad Femenino.

== Club career ==
Aguirresabala has scored six goals and provided three assists in the 2025–26 Liga F and played over 1,700 minutes in 19 starts.

== Honours ==
Spain U19

- UEFA Women's Under-19 Championship: 2025
