= Olivia Ulenius =

Finnish footballer (born 2007)

Personal information
- Full name: Olivia Alexandra Linnéa Ulenius
- Date of birth: 28 April 2007 (age 19)
- Place of birth: Mariehamn, Åland, Finland
- Position: Forward

Team information
- Current team: Djurgården

Youth career
- IFK Mariehamn

Senior career*
Years	Team	Apps	(Gls)
2020–2021	IFK Mariehamn	3	(3)
2021–2024	Åland United	64	(17)
2025–	Djurgården	12	(1)

International career^{‡}
2022–	Finland U17	3	(1)
2026–	Finland	2	(1)
- * Club domestic league appearances and goals ‡ National team caps and goals as of 15 October 2026

Olivia Alexandra Linnéa Ulenius (born April 28, 2007) is a Finnish footballer, who represents Djurgården in the Damallsvenskan.

Ulenius made her debut in the adult leagues at the age of 13 in the 2020 season of Naisten Kolmonen in IFK Mariehamn's team. She played her first match in the top-tier Kansallinen Liiga in the summer of 2021 and in the same autumn signed a contract with Åland United until 2024. In the spring of 2022, Ulenius' contract was extended until 2025. Ulenius scored her first league goal in May 2022 against FC Ilves. She was awarded as the best player of the Finnish Women's Cup final in 2022.

Ulenius played her first international match in April 2022, when the Finnish U15 women's national team faced Estonia.

On 16 January 2025, Ulenius signed with Djurgården.

== Career statistics ==
=== International ===
As of 13 October 2026

Appearances and goals by national team and year
National team	Year	Apps	Goals
Finland	2026	2	1
Total		2	1

Scores and results list Finland's goal tally first, score column indicates score after each Ulenius goal.

List of international goals scored by Olivia Ulenius
No.	Date	Venue	Cap	Opponent	Score	Result	Competition
1	13 October 2026	Serbian FA Sports Center, Stara Pazova, Serbia	2	Serbia	3–1	3–1	2027 FIFA Women's World Cup play-offs
