= Cristina Librán =

Spanish footballer (born 2006)

Personal information
- Full name: Cristina Librán Quiroga
- Date of birth: 11 January 2006 (age 20)
- Place of birth: Madrid, Spain
- Height: 1.65 m (5 ft 5 in)
- Position: Midfielder

Team information
- Current team: Juventus
- Number: 46

Youth career
- Madrid CFF B

Senior career*
| Years | Team | Apps | (Gls) |
| 2023–2025 | Madrid CFF | 64 | (6) |
| 2025– | Juventus | 4 | (0) |
| 2026 | → Servette (loan) | 11 | (2) |

International career^{‡}
| 2022–2023 | Spain U17 | 18 | (2) |
| 2023– | Spain U19 | 28 | (8) |
| 2024 | Spain U20 | 5 | (0) |
Medal record
Women's football
Representing Spain
FIFA U-20 Women's World Cup
| Winner | 2026 Poland |
UEFA Women's Under-19 Championship
| Winner | 2024 Lithuania |
| Winner | 2025 Poland |
- * Club domestic league appearances and goals as of 17 September 2026 ‡ National team caps and goals as of 21:58, 30 November 2025 (UTC)

Cristina Librán Quiroga (born 11 January 2006) is a Spanish professional footballer who plays as a midfielder for Serie A club Juventus.

== Club career ==
She arrived at the Madrid CFF B, where she won the league and promotion to 1st Federation 2022–2023. She was promoted to the first team in 2023.

In July 2025, Librán signed a three-year deal with Serie A club Juventus. In January 2026, she went out on loan to Swiss Women's Super League (SWSL) club Servette for the remainder of the season.

== International career ==
Librán played for the Spain under-19 team in the 2024 UEFA Women's Under-19 Championship, and captained the side during the 2025 UEFA Women's Under-19 Championship.

== Honours ==
Spain U19

- UEFA Women's Under-19 Championship: 2024, 2025

Spain U20

- FIFA U-20 Women's World Cup: 2026
