= Lithuania women's national under-19 football team =

Lithuania Women's U-19
- Association: Lithuanian Football Federation
- Confederation: UEFA (Europe)
- Head coach: Cederique Tulleners
- FIFA code: LTU

First international
- Lithuania 0–4 England, (2 October 2002)

Biggest win
- Andorra 1–6 Lithuania, (7 April 2023)

Biggest defeat
- Switzerland 17–0 Lithuania, (28 October 2023)

UEFA Women's Under-19 Championship
- Appearances: 1 (first in 2024)
- Best result: Group Stage (2024)

The Lithuanian women's national under-19 football team represents Lithuania at the UEFA Women's Under-19 Championship and the FIFA U-20 Women's World Cup.

== History ==
=== UEFA Women's Under-19 Championship ===
The Lithuanian team has only qualified for the UEFA Women's Under-19 Championship once, as they are hosting the upcoming 2024 tournament.

Year	Result	Matches	Wins	Draws	Losses	GF	GA
Two-legged final 1998	did not qualify						
(Sweden) 1999	did not qualify						
(France) 2000	did not qualify						
(Norway) 2001	did not qualify						
(Sweden) 2002	did not qualify						
(Germany) 2003	did not qualify						
(Finland) 2004	did not qualify						
(Hungary) 2005	did not qualify						
(Switzerland) 2006	did not qualify						
(Iceland) 2007	did not qualify						
(France) 2008	did not qualify						
(Belarus) 2009	did not qualify						
(North Macedonia) 2010	did not qualify						
(Italy) 2011	did not qualify						
(Turkey) 2012	did not qualify						
(Wales) 2013	did not qualify						
(Norway) 2014	did not qualify						
(Israel) 2015	did not qualify						
(Slovakia) 2016	did not qualify						
(Northern Ireland) 2017	did not qualify						
(Switzerland) 2018	did not qualify						
(Scotland) 2019	did not qualify						
(Georgia (country)) ~~2020~~	Cancelled due to the COVID-19 pandemic						
(Belarus) ~~2021~~	Cancelled due to the COVID-19 pandemic						
(Czech Republic) 2022	did not qualify						
(Belgium) 2023	did not qualify						
(Lithuania) 2024	Group stage	3	0	0	3	1	20
(Poland) 2025	Did not qualify						
(Bosnia and Herzegovina) 2026	Did not qualify						
(Hungary) 2027	TBD						
Total	1/25	3	0	0	3	1	20

== See also ==
- Lithuania women's national football team
- Lithuania women's national under-17 football team
- FIFA U-20 Women's World Cup
- UEFA Women's Under-19 Championship
