= Faroe Islands women's national under-19 football team =

National association football team

Faroe Islands Women's U-19
- Association: Faroe Islands Football Association
- Confederation: UEFA (Europe)
- FIFA code: FRO

First international
- England 7–1 Faroe Islands, (27 September 2007)

Biggest win
- Faroe Islands 4–0 Moldova, (22 October 2017); Liechtenstein 0–4 Faroe Islands, (14 November 2022)

Biggest defeat
- Spain 12–0 Faroe Islands, (29 September 2007)

UEFA Women's Under-19 Championship
- Appearances: 0

FIFA U-20 Women's World Cup
- Appearances: 0

The Faroese women's national under-19 football team represents the Faroe Islands at the UEFA Women's Under-19 Championship and the FIFA U-20 Women's World Cup.

== History ==
=== UEFA Women's Under-19 Championship ===
The Faroese team has never qualified for the UEFA Women's Under-19 Championship.

Year	Result	Matches	Wins	Draws	Losses	GF	GA
Two-legged final 1998	did not participate						
(Sweden) 1999	did not participate						
(France) 2000	did not participate						
(Norway) 2001	did not participate						
(Sweden) 2002	did not participate						
(Germany) 2003	did not participate						
(Finland) 2004	did not participate						
(Hungary) 2005	did not participate						
(Switzerland) 2006	did not participate						
(Iceland) 2007	did not qualify						
(France) 2008	did not qualify						
(Belarus) 2009	did not qualify						
(North Macedonia) 2010	did not qualify						
(Italy) 2011	did not qualify						
(Turkey) 2012	did not qualify						
(Wales) 2013	did not qualify						
(Norway) 2014	did not qualify						
(Israel) 2015	did not qualify						
(Slovakia) 2016	did not qualify						
(Northern Ireland) 2017	did not qualify						
(Switzerland) 2018	did not qualify						
(Scotland) 2019	did not qualify						
(Georgia (country)) ~~2020~~	Cancelled due to the COVID-19 pandemic						
(Belarus) ~~2021~~	Cancelled due to the COVID-19 pandemic						
(Czech Republic) 2022	did not qualify						
(Belgium) 2023	did not qualify						
(Lithuania) 2024	did not qualify						
(Poland) 2025	did not qualify						
(Bosnia and Herzegovina) 2026	did not qualify						
(Hungary) 2027	TBD						
Total	0/26	0	0	0	0	0	0

== See also ==
- Faroe Islands women's national football team
- Faroe Islands women's national under-17 football team
- FIFA U-20 Women's World Cup
- UEFA Women's Under-19 Championship
