= Portugal women's national under-19 football team =

National U-19 association football team

Portugal
- Association: FPF
- Confederation: UEFA (Europe)
- Head coach: Marisa Gomes
- FIFA code: POR
First colours	Second colours

First international
- Portugal 1–0 Republic of Ireland; Óbidos, Portugal; 2 October 2002

Biggest win
- Belarus 0–10 Portugal; Caldas da Rainha, Portugal; 10 April 2014

Biggest defeat
- Portugal 1–9 Spain; Eskilstuna, Sweden; 31 October 2023

UEFA Women's Under-19 Championship
- Appearances: 2 (first in 2012)
- Best result: Semi-finals (2012, 2025)

FIFA U-20 World Cup
- Appearances: 1 (first in 2026)
- Best result: Round of 16 (2026)

The Portuguese women's national under-19 football team represents Portugal in international youth association football competitions.

== Competitive record ==
Portugal have qualified for two UEFA Women's Under-19 Championships. They reached the semi-final in Euro 2012 and Euro 2025. The team had never qualified for the FIFA U-20 Women's World Cup until 2026; they qualified as one of the five best teams at Euro 2025.

=== UEFA Women's Under-19 Championship ===
UEFA Women's Under-19 Championship record
Year	Result	Position	Pld	W	D*	L	GF	GA
2002–2011	did not qualify							
(Turkey) 2012	Semi-finals	–	4	1	1	2	1	2
2013–2024	did not qualify							
(Poland) 2025	Semi-finals	–	4	2	0	2	9	7
(Bosnia and Herzegovina) 2026	Did not qualify							
(Hungary) 2027	TBD							
Total	Semi-finals	2/21	8	3	1	4	10	9

=== FIFA U-20 Women's World Cup ===
Year	Result	Pld	W	D	L	GF	GA	Squad
(Canada) 2002	Did not qualify							
(Thailand) 2004	Did not qualify							
(Russia) 2006	Did not qualify							
(Chile) 2008	Did not qualify							
(Germany) 2010	Did not qualify							
(Japan) 2012	Did not qualify							
(Canada) 2014	Did not qualify							
(Papua New Guinea) 2016	Did not qualify							
(France) 2018	Did not qualify							
(Costa Rica) 2022	Did not qualify							
(Colombia) 2024	Did not qualify							
(Poland) 2026	Round of 16	4	1	1	2	3	4	Squad
Total:1/12	Round of 16	4	1	1	2	3	4	-
