= 2025 UEFA Women's Under-19 Championship =

Mistrzostwa Europy U-19 w Piłce Nożnej Kobiet 2025

Tournament details
- Host country: Poland
- Dates: 15–27 June
- Teams: 8 (from 1 confederation)

Final positions
- Champions: Spain (7th title)
- Runners-up: France

Tournament statistics
- Matches played: 15
- Goals scored: 47 (3.13 per match)
- Attendance: 9,713 (648 per match)
- Top scorer(s): (France) Liana Joseph (4 goals)
- Best player: (France) Maeline Mendy

The 2025 UEFA Women's Under-19 Championship was the 22nd edition of the UEFA Women's Under-19 Championship, the annual international youth football championship organised by UEFA for the women's under-19 national teams of Europe. It was held in Poland, after the original host Belarus was stripped from hosting rights due to the country's involvement of the Russian invasion of Ukraine.

Similar to the previous editions held in odd-numbered years, the tournament acted as the UEFA qualifiers for the FIFA U-20 Women's World Cup. The top five teams of the tournament would qualify for the 2026 FIFA U-20 Women's World Cup in Poland as the UEFA representatives besides Poland who automatically qualified as hosts. If Poland finished in the top four, the team that ranked fifth and sixth in the final stage would also qualify.

A total of eight teams played in the tournament, with players born on or after 1 January 2006 eligible to participate.

== Venues ==
Poland
| Mielec | 2025 UEFA Women's Under-19 Championship is located in Poland | Stalowa Wola |
|---|---|---|
| Stadium Mielec | 2025 UEFA Women's Under-19 Championship is located in Poland | Stadium Stalowa Wola |
| Capacity: 7,000 | 2025 UEFA Women's Under-19 Championship is located in Poland | Capacity: 3,764 |
| Rzeszów | 2025 UEFA Women's Under-19 Championship is located in Poland | Tarnobrzeg |
| Stadium Rzeszów | 2025 UEFA Women's Under-19 Championship is located in Poland | Stadium Tarnobrzeg |
| Capacity: 15,026 | 2025 UEFA Women's Under-19 Championship is located in Poland | Capacity: 3,770 |

== Qualification ==
51 (out of 55) UEFA nations entered the qualifying competition, with the hosts Poland also competing despite already qualifying automatically, and seven teams would qualify for the final tournament at the end of round 2 to join the hosts.

== Qualified teams ==
Seven teams qualified for the final tournament along with hosts Poland.

| Team | Method of qualification | Appearance | Last appearance | Previous best performance |
|---|---|---|---|---|
| Poland | Hosts | 2nd | 2007 (Group stage) | Group stage (2007) |
| Netherlands | Round 2 Group A1 winners | 13th | 2024 (Runners-up) | **Champions** (2014) |
| Portugal | Round 2 Group A2 winners | 2nd | 2012 (Semi-finals) | Semi-finals (2012) |
| England | Round 2 Group A3 winners | 16th | 2024 (Semi-finals) | **Champions** (2009) |
| Italy | Round 2 Group A4 winners | 9th | 2022 (Group stage) | **Champions** (2008) |
| Spain | Round 2 Group A5 winners | 18th | 2024 (Champions) | **Champions** (2004, 2017, 2018, 2022, 2023, 2024) |
| France | Round 2 Group A6 winners | 19th | 2024 (Semi-finals) | **Champions** (2003, 2010, 2013, 2016, 2019) |
| Sweden | Round 2 best runners-up | 14th | 2022 (Semi-finals) | **Champions** (1999, 2012, 2015) |

^{1} Bold indicates champions for that year. Italic indicates hosts for that year.

== Group stage ==
The group winners and runners-up advanced to the semi-finals and automatically qualified for the 2026 FIFA U-20 Women's World Cup. If Poland had finished fourth in their group, the play-off match for the 2026 FIFA U-20 Women's World Cup would have been played.

Tie-breaking criteria for group play
The ranking of teams in the group stage was determined as follows:
1. Points obtained in all group matches;
2. Points in head-to-head matches among tied teams;
3. Goal difference in head-to-head matches among tied teams;
4. Goals scored in head-to-head matches among tied teams;
5. If more than two teams were tied, and after applying all head-to-head criteria above, a subset of teams were still tied, all head-to-head criteria above were reapplied exclusively to this subset of teams;
6. Goal difference in all group matches;
7. Goals scored in all group matches;
8. Penalty shoot-out if only two teams had the same number of points, and they met in the last round of the group and were tied after applying all criteria above (not used if more than two teams had the same number of points, or if their rankings were not relevant for qualification for the next stage);
9. Disciplinary points
  - Yellow card: −1 point;
  - Indirect red card (second yellow card): −3 points;
  - Direct red card: −3 points;
10. UEFA coefficient for the qualifying round draw;
11. Drawing of lots.

=== Group A ===
| Pos | Team | Pld | W | D | L | GF | GA | GD | Pts | Qualification |
|---|---|---|---|---|---|---|---|---|---|---|
| 1 | France | 3 | 3 | 0 | 0 | 11 | 1 | +10 | 9 | Knockout stage and qualification for 2026 FIFA U-20 Women's World Cup |
| 2 | Italy | 3 | 1 | 1 | 1 | 3 | 3 | 0 | 4 | Knockout stage and qualification for 2026 FIFA U-20 Women's World Cup |
| 3 | Poland (H) | 3 | 1 | 1 | 1 | 6 | 7 | −1 | 4 | 2026 FIFA U-20 Women's World Cup (Note: Poland qualified for the 2026 FIFA U-20 Women's World Cup as hosts.) |
| 4 | Sweden | 3 | 0 | 0 | 3 | 0 | 9 | −9 | 0 | |

Source: UEFA
Rules for classification: Group stage tiebreakers
(H) Hosts
Notes:
15 June 2025
18:00

| Poland | 1–1 | Italy |
|---|---|---|
| Araśniewicz 63' | Report | Pellegrino Cimò 90+2' |

Stadium Stalowa Wola, Stalowa Wola
Attendance: 2,655
Referee: Kristina Georgieva (Bulgaria)
15 June 2025
19:00

| France | 3–0 | Sweden |
|---|---|---|
| Joseph 26'; Effa Effa 63'; Graziani 70' | Report |

Stadium Rzeszów, Rzeszów
Attendance: 283
Referee: Rasa Grigonė (Lithuania)

18 June 2025
18:00

| Poland | 0–6 | France |
|---|---|---|
| | Report | Joseph 8', 34', 52'; Swierot 40'; Graziani 74'; Ma. Mendy 90+2' |

Stadium Mielec, Mielec
Attendance: 2,264
Referee: Merima Čelik (Bosnia & Herzegovina)
18 June 2025
19:00

| Sweden | 0–1 | Italy |
|---|---|---|
| | Report | Pellegrino Cimò 37' |

Stadium Stalowa Wola, Stalowa Wola
Attendance: 178
Referee: Fabienne Michel (Germany)

21 June 2025
16:00

| Sweden | 0–5 | Poland |
|---|---|---|
| | Report | Araśniewicz 6', 47'; Wyrwas 85'; Gutowska 90+3', 90+5' |

Stadium Tarnobrzeg, Tarnobrzeg
Attendance: 2,717
Referee: Lotta Vuorio (Finland)
21 June 2025
16:00

| Italy | 1–2 | France |
|---|---|---|
| Sciabica 60' | Report | Lushimba Bilombi 33'; Dufour 74' |

Stadium Rzeszów, Rzeszów
Attendance: 238
Referee: Emilie Torkelsen (Norway)

=== Group B ===
| Pos | Team | Pld | W | D | L | GF | GA | GD | Pts | Qualification |
|---|---|---|---|---|---|---|---|---|---|---|
| 1 | Spain | 3 | 2 | 0 | 1 | 3 | 1 | +2 | 6 (Note: Head-to-head points: Spain 3, Portugal 0.) | Knockout stage and qualification for 2026 FIFA U-20 Women's World Cup |
| 2 | Portugal | 3 | 2 | 0 | 1 | 6 | 3 | +3 | 6 | Knockout stage and qualification for 2026 FIFA U-20 Women's World Cup |
| 3 | England | 3 | 1 | 0 | 2 | 3 | 6 | −3 | 3 (Note: Head-to-head points: England 3, Netherlands 0.) | Qualification for the 2026 FIFA U-20 Women's World Cup |
| 4 | Netherlands | 3 | 1 | 0 | 2 | 2 | 4 | −2 | 3 | |

Source: UEFA
Rules for classification: Group stage tiebreakers
Notes:
15 June 2025
17:00

| Portugal | 0–2 | Spain |
|---|---|---|
| | Report | Agote 45' (pen.); Agirrezabala 57' |

Stadium Mielec, Mielec
Attendance: 296
Referee: Lotta Vuorio (Finland)
15 June 2025
17:00

| England | 2–1 | Netherlands |
|---|---|---|
| Ademiluyi 49'; Rademaker 54' (o.g.) | Report | Zuidberg 44' |

Stadium Tarnobrzeg, Tarnobrzeg
Attendance: 648
Referee: Fabienne Michel (Germany)

18 June 2025
17:00

| Portugal | 4–1 | England |
|---|---|---|
| Santiago 76', 89'; Marques 78'; Gago 82' (pen.) | Report | Lobo 45+2' (o.g.) |

Stadium Tarnobrzeg, Tarnobrzeg
Attendance: 611
Referee: Kristina Georgieva (Bulgaria)
18 June 2025
17:00

| Netherlands | 1–0 | Spain |
|---|---|---|
| Zuidberg 12' | Report |

Stadium Rzeszów, Rzeszów
Attendance: 307
Referee: Emilie Torkelsen (Norway)

21 June 2025
19:00

| Netherlands | 0–2 | Portugal |
|---|---|---|
| | Report | Gago 59' (pen.); Kaminska 71' |

Stadium Mielec, Mielec
Attendance: 241
Referee: Merima Čelik (Bosnia and Herzegovina)
21 June 2025
19:00

| Spain | 1–0 | England |
|---|---|---|
| Librán 90+6' | Report |

Stadium Stalowa Wola, Stalowa Wola
Attendance: 283
Referee: Rasa Grigonė (Lithuania)

== Knockout stage ==
In the knockout stage, extra time and penalty shoot-out were used to decide the winners if necessary.

=== Bracket ===
Semi-finals
24 June
France (a.e.t.) | 4
Portugal | 3
24 June
Spain (a.e.t.) | 2
Italy | 0

Final
27 June
France | 0
Spain | 4

=== Semi-finals ===
24 June 2025
17:00

| Spain | 2−0 (a.e.t.) | Italy |
|---|---|---|
| Dorado 92'; Agote 119' | Report |

Stadium Mielec, Mielec
Attendance: 236
Referee: Lotta Vuorio (Finland)
24 June 2025
20:00

| France | 4−3 (a.e.t.) | Portugal |
|---|---|---|
| Graziani 7'; Ma. Mendy 13', 92'; Mé. Mendy 113' (pen.) | Report | Gago 30' (pen.); Martins 74'; Costa 105+2' |

Stadium Stalowa Wola, Stalowa Wola
Attendance: 275
Referee: Rasa Grigonė (Lithuania)

=== Final ===
27 June 2025
20:00

| France | 0–4 | Spain |
|---|---|---|
| | Report | Librán 23'; Agote 35'; Serrajordi 69'; Bejarano 87' |

Stadium Rzeszów, Rzeszów
Attendance: 1,198
Referee: Fabienne Michel (Germany)

== Goalscorers ==
There were 47 goals scored in 15 matches, for an average of 3.13 goals per match.

4 goals

- (France) Liana Joseph

3 goals

- (France) Ornella Graziani
- (France) Maeline Mendy
- (Poland) Weronika Araśniewicz
- (Portugal) Marta Gago
- (Spain) Daniela Agote

2 goals

- (Italy) Giada Pellegrino Cimò
- (Netherlands) Zoë Zuidberg
- (Poland) Julia Gutowska
- (Portugal) Carolina Santiago
- (Spain) Cris Librán

1 goal

- (England) Princess Ademiluyi
- (France) Kenza Dufour
- (France) Chancelle Effa Effa
- (France) Landryna Lushimba Bilombi
- (France) Mélinda Mendy
- (France) Julie Swierot
- (Italy) Manuela Sciabica
- (Poland) Kinga Wyrwas
- (Portugal) Diana Costa
- (Portugal) Dária Kaminska
- (Portugal) Anna Marques
- (Portugal) Lara Martins
- (Spain) Aiara Agirrezabala
- (Spain) Noemí Bejarano
- (Spain) Irune Dorado
- (Spain) Clara Serrajordi

1 own goal

- (Netherlands) Liv Rademaker (against England)
- (Portugal) Iara Lobo (against England)

== Awards ==
The following awards were given after the tournament:

- Player of the Tournament: (France) Maeline Mendy
- Top Scorer: (France) Liana Joseph (4 goals)

=== Team of the Tournament ===
After the tournament, the Under-19 Team of the Tournament was selected by the UEFA Technical Observer panel.

| Position | Player |
|---|---|
| Goalkeeper | (Spain) Laia López |
| Defenders | (Spain) Noemí Bejarano |
| Defenders | (Spain) Aïcha Camara |
| Defenders | (Italy) Azzurra Gallo |
| Defenders | (Netherlands) Olivia Rademaker |
| Midfielders | (Spain) Clara Serrajordi |
| Midfielders | (Spain) Irune Dorado |
| Midfielders | (France) Maeline Mendy |
| Forwards | (Spain) Daniela Agote |
| Forwards | (France) Liana Joseph |
| Forwards | (France) Ornella Graziani |

== Qualified teams for FIFA U-20 Women's World Cup ==
The following six teams from UEFA qualified for the 2026 FIFA U-20 Women's World Cup, including Poland which qualified as hosts.

| Team | Qualified on | Previous appearances in FIFA U-20 Women's World Cup^{1} |
|---|---|---|
| Poland | 17 December 2023 | 0 (debut) |
| France | 18 June 2025 | 9 (2002, 2006, 2008, 2010, 2014, 2016, 2018, 2022, 2024) |
| Italy | 18 June 2025 | 2 (2004, 2012) |
| England | 21 June 2025 | 5 (2002, 2008, 2010, 2014, 2018) |
| Portugal | 21 June 2025 | 0 (debut) |
| Spain | 21 June 2025 | 5 (2004, 2016, 2018, **2022**, 2024) |

^{1} Bold indicates champions for that year. Italic indicates hosts for that year.
