= 2026 FIFA U-20 Women's World Cup squads =

List of squads

The following is a list of squads for each national team that competed at the 2026 FIFA U-20 Women's World Cup. The tournament took place in Poland, between 5 to 27 September 2026. It was the 12th biennial international world youth football championship organised by FIFA for the women's under-20 national teams.

Players born between 1 January 2006 and 31 December 2010 were eligible to compete in the tournament. Each team had to register a squad of 23 players, minimum three of whom had to be goalkeepers (regulation article 27.1). The final squads were confirmed by FIFA on 29 August 2026. The full squad listings are below.

The age listed for each player is their age as of 5 September 2026, the first day of the tournament. The numbers of caps and goals listed for each player do not include any matches played after the start of the tournament. The club listed is the club for which the player last played a competitive match prior to the tournament. The nationality for each club reflects the national association (not the league) to which the club is affiliated. A flag is included for coaches who are of a different nationality to their team.

== Group A ==
=== Argentina ===
Head coach: Christian Meloni

| No. | Pos. | Player | Date of birth (age) | Caps | Goals | Club |
|---|---|---|---|---|---|---|
| 1 | GK | Priscila Siben | 3 April 2007 (aged 19) | 0 | 0 | (Argentine Football Association) Banfield |
| 2 | FW | Alma Velasco Heim | 13 April 2006 (aged 20) | 0 | 0 | (Royal Spanish Football Federation) Levante |
| 3 | MF | Carolina Ceniza | 12 August 2007 (aged 19) | 0 | 0 | (Argentine Football Association) River Plate |
| 4 | DF | Sofia Quiroga | 15 May 2008 (aged 18) | 0 | 0 | (Argentine Football Association) River Plate |
| 5 | MF | Agustina Maldonado | 19 March 2009 (aged 17) | 0 | 0 | (Argentine Football Association) River Plate |
| 6 | DF | Julia Vinhas | 27 May 2009 (aged 17) | 0 | 0 | (Argentine Football Association) Platense |
| 7 | FW | Julieta Aguilar | 29 July 2010 (aged 16) | 0 | 0 | (Argentine Football Association) Newell's Old Boys |
| 8 | MF | Julieta Martínez | 3 October 2007 (aged 18) | 0 | 0 | (Argentine Football Association) Boca Juniors |
| 9 | FW | Mercedes Diz | 24 February 2009 (aged 17) | 0 | 0 | (Argentine Football Association) River Plate |
| 10 | MF | Brisa Jara | 14 August 2007 (aged 19) | 0 | 0 | (Argentine Football Association) Talleres |
| 11 | MF | Dolo Delgado | 17 April 2008 (aged 18) | 0 | 0 | (Royal Spanish Football Federation) Atlético Madrid |
| 12 | GK | Juana Schipper | 14 February 2008 (aged 18) | 0 | 0 | (Argentine Football Association) Talleres |
| 13 | MF | Luzmila Ramirez | 25 May 2006 (aged 20) | 0 | 0 | (Argentine Football Association) Boca Juniors |
| 14 | DF | Luisana Araya | 4 June 2007 (aged 19) | 0 | 0 | (Argentine Football Association) Belgrano |
| 15 | MF | Morena Calvo | 29 May 2006 (aged 20) | 0 | 0 | (Argentine Football Association) Boca Juniors |
| 16 | DF | Camila Ochoa | 28 March 2007 (aged 19) | 0 | 0 | (Argentine Football Association) Independiente |
| 17 | FW | Violeta Alvarez | 28 April 2009 (aged 17) | 0 | 0 | (Argentine Football Association) Boca Juniors |
| 18 | FW | Pia Alvarez | 31 October 2008 (aged 17) | 0 | 0 | (Argentine Football Association) Independiente |
| 19 | FW | Annika Paz | 16 November 2008 (aged 17) | 0 | 4 | (Italian Football Federation) Inter Milan |
| 20 | FW | Giselle White | 29 May 2008 (aged 18) | 0 | 0 | (United States Soccer Federation) Santa Rosa United |
| 21 | GK | Naila Zaninetti | 26 May 2006 (aged 20) | 0 | 0 | (Argentine Football Association) Unión |

=== Benin ===
Head coach: Ouzérou Abdoulaye

| No. | Pos. | Player | Date of birth (age) | Caps | Goals | Club |
|---|---|---|---|---|---|---|
| 1 | GK | Larissa Saizonou | 21 May 2008 (aged 18) | 0 | 0 | (Benin Football Federation) UMSA |
| 2 | DF | Mistourath Seibou | 14 September 2006 (aged 19) | 0 | 0 | (Benin Football Federation) AS Gamia |
| 3 | DF | Laura Abikou | 26 January 2007 (aged 19) | 0 | 0 | (Benin Football Federation) UMSA |
| 4 | DF | Jocelyne Tetchri | 30 September 2007 (aged 18) | 0 | 0 | (Benin Football Federation) AS Gamia |
| 5 | DF | Assanatou Alassane | 1 January 2008 (aged 18) | 0 | 0 | (Benin Football Federation) AS Cotonou |
| 6 | MF | Hermionne Lokossou | 29 July 2009 (aged 17) | 0 | 0 | (Benin Football Federation) AS Lagarde |
| 7 | FW | Romaine Gandonou | 13 November 2010 (aged 15) | 0 | 0 | (Benin Football Federation) AS Tambours FC |
| 8 | MF | Mouibath Awena | 20 December 2009 (aged 16) | 0 | 0 | (Benin Football Federation) Goutchira Omnisport |
| 9 | MF | Rakibatou Sabi Manin | 30 April 2006 (aged 20) | 0 | 0 | (Benin Football Federation) AKSP |
| 10 | MF | Yasminath Djibril | 13 March 2006 (aged 20) | 0 | 0 | (Benin Football Federation) Aïnonvi FC |
| 11 | MF | Angela Gbadessi | 5 January 2010 (aged 16) | 0 | 0 | (Benin Football Federation) AS Cotonou |
| 12 | DF | Deo-Gratias Ebi | 13 December 2008 (aged 17) | 0 | 0 | (Benin Football Federation) UMSA |
| 13 | MF | Pierrette Chigblo | 16 February 2006 (aged 20) | 0 | 0 | (Benin Football Federation) Dynamique FC |
| 14 | FW | Hosane Soukou | 23 May 2007 (aged 19) | 0 | 0 | (United States Soccer Federation) NSU Demons |
| 15 | MF | Fidele Toudonou | 19 July 2007 (aged 19) | 0 | 0 | (Benin Football Federation) UMSA |
| 16 | GK | Esther Ogoudare | 13 September 2007 (aged 18) | 0 | 0 | (Benin Football Federation) Espoir FC |
| 17 | DF | Estelle Vidinhouede | 19 July 2008 (aged 18) | 0 | 0 | (Benin Football Federation) UMSA |
| 18 | MF | Joelle Kpadonou | 15 May 2006 (aged 20) | 0 | 0 | (Sierra Leone Football Association) Mogbwemo Queens FC |
| 19 | FW | Germaine Honfo | 24 May 2007 (aged 19) | 0 | 0 | (Royal Moroccan Football Federation) Club Municipal Laayoune FF |
| 20 | DF | Nailatou Sadikou | 2 February 2007 (aged 19) | 0 | 0 | (German Football Association) 1. FSV Mainz 05 |
| 21 | GK | Nadiath Salifou | 22 December 2006 (aged 19) | 0 | 0 | (Benin Football Federation) AS Cotonou |

=== Mexico ===
The final squad was announced on 17 August 2026.

Head coach: (Brazil) Dorival Bueno

| No. | Pos. | Player | Date of birth (age) | Caps | Goals | Club |
|---|---|---|---|---|---|---|
| 1 | GK | Mariangela Medina | 9 May 2006 (aged 20) | 0 | 0 | (United States Soccer Federation) UCLA Bruins |
| 2 | DF | Michel Fong | 2 June 2006 (aged 20) | 0 | 0 | (Mexican Football Federation) Tijuana |
| 3 | DF | Natalia Muñoz | 10 March 2007 (aged 19) | 0 | 0 | (Mexican Football Federation) Tigres UANL |
| 4 | DF | Berenice Ibarra | 24 October 2008 (aged 17) | 0 | 0 | (Mexican Football Federation) Pachuca |
| 5 | DF | Ana Torres | 9 May 2007 (aged 19) | 0 | 0 | (Mexican Football Federation) Atlante |
| 6 | MF | Julia Valadez | 6 April 2006 (aged 20) | 0 | 0 | (Mexican Football Federation) Pachuca |
| 7 | DF | Maria Gonzalez | 9 August 2006 (aged 20) | 0 | 0 | (Mexican Football Federation) Tigres UANL |
| 8 | MF | Abril Fragoso | 15 May 2007 (aged 19) | 0 | 0 | (Mexican Football Federation) Pachuca |
| 9 | FW | Deiry Ramirez | 30 June 2006 (aged 20) | 0 | 0 | (Mexican Football Federation) Tigres UANL |
| 10 | FW | Alice Soto | 26 March 2006 (aged 20) | 0 | 0 | (Mexican Football Federation) Monterrey |
| 11 | MF | Monique Montes | 30 August 2007 (aged 19) | 0 | 0 | (Mexican Football Federation) Monterrey |
| 12 | GK | Camila Vazquez | 17 July 2007 (aged 19) | 0 | 0 | (Mexican Football Federation) Atlas |
| 13 | DF | Ashlee Mora | 11 August 2006 (aged 20) | 0 | 0 | (United States Soccer Federation) UTEP Miners |
| 14 | MF | Alexa Soto | 20 March 2007 (aged 19) | 0 | 0 | (Mexican Football Federation) América |
| 15 | DF | Mia Villalpando | 10 May 2008 (aged 18) | 0 | 0 | (Mexican Football Federation) Tigres UANL |
| 16 | MF | Noemi Villalobos | 5 December 2006 (aged 19) | 0 | 0 | (Mexican Football Federation) Atlas |
| 17 | FW | Jalen Chaney | 1 October 2006 (aged 19) | 0 | 0 | (United States Soccer Federation) Creighton Bluejays |
| 18 | DF | Arantza Segura | 3 August 2007 (aged 19) | 0 | 0 | (Mexican Football Federation) América |
| 19 | FW | Montserrat Saldivar | 20 September 2006 (aged 19) | 0 | 0 | (Mexican Football Federation) América |
| 20 | DF | Alexa Martinez | 31 October 2008 (aged 17) | 0 | 0 | (Mexican Football Federation) Pachuca |
| 21 | GK | Valentina Murrieta | 22 October 2008 (aged 17) | 0 | 0 | (Mexican Football Federation) América |

=== Poland ===
The final squad was announced on 10 August 2026.

Head coach: Marcin Kasprowicz

| No. | Pos. | Player | Date of birth (age) | Caps | Goals | Club |
|---|---|---|---|---|---|---|
| 1 | GK | Julia Woźniak | 15 April 2007 (aged 19) | 0 | 0 | (Portuguese Football Federation) Sporting CP |
| 2 | DF | Oliwia Łapińska | 9 February 2007 (aged 19) | 0 | 0 | (Polish Football Association) Czarni Sosnowiec |
| 3 | FW | Oliwia Związek | 22 June 2007 (aged 19) | 0 | 0 | (Polish Football Association) Lech Poznań UAM |
| 4 | DF | Magda Piekarska | 9 September 2007 (aged 18) | 0 | 0 | (Italian Football Federation) Roma |
| 5 | DF | Emilia Sobierajska | 22 August 2007 (aged 19) | 0 | 0 | (Polish Football Association) Czarni Sosnowiec |
| 6 | DF | Iga Witkowska | 27 March 2007 (aged 19) | 0 | 0 | (Polish Football Association) Czarni Sosnowiec |
| 7 | MF | Krystyna Flis | 4 January 2007 (aged 19) | 0 | 0 | (Swiss Football Association) Basel |
| 8 | MF | Zuzanna Witek | 19 September 2007 (aged 18) | 0 | 0 | (Danish Football Association) HB Køge |
| 9 | FW | Julia Gutowska | 17 February 2007 (aged 19) | 0 | 0 | (Danish Football Association) HB Køge |
| 10 | MF | Maja Zielińska | 11 August 2007 (aged 19) | 0 | 0 | (Polish Football Association) Legia Warsaw |
| 11 | MF | Oliwia Zgoda | 8 November 2007 (aged 18) | 0 | 0 | (Polish Football Association) Czarni Sosnowiec |
| 12 | GK | Zuzanna Błaszczyk | 17 July 2008 (aged 18) | 0 | 0 | (Polish Football Association) Śląsk Wrocław |
| 13 | DF | Zofia Pągowska | 25 April 2007 (aged 19) | 0 | 0 | (Polish Football Association) UKS SMS Łódź |
| 14 | DF | Jagoda Cyraniak | 23 May 2006 (aged 20) | 0 | 0 | (French Football Federation) Marseille |
| 15 | FW | Weronika Araśniewicz | 15 March 2008 (aged 18) | 0 | 0 | (German Football Association) VfL Wolfsburg |
| 16 | FW | Zuzanna Grzywińska | 23 June 2006 (aged 20) | 0 | 0 | (German Football Association) 1. FC Nürnberg |
| 17 | MF | Lena Świrska | 19 May 2009 (aged 17) | 0 | 0 | (Polish Football Association) Pogoń Szczecin |
| 18 | DF | Martyna Bartczak | 25 June 2007 (aged 19) | 0 | 0 | (Polish Football Association) UKS SMS Łódź |
| 19 | FW | Kinga Wyrwas | 21 January 2007 (aged 19) | 0 | 0 | (Italian Football Federation) Sassuolo |
| 20 | MF | Inez Sikora | 23 March 2006 (aged 20) | 0 | 0 | (Polish Football Association) Górnik Łęczna |
| 21 | GK | Hanna Wieczerzak | 29 May 2007 (aged 19) | 0 | 0 | (Royal Spanish Football Federation) Real Madrid |

== Group B ==
=== Brazil ===
The final squad was announced on 19 August 2026.

Head coach: Camilla Orlando

| No. | Pos. | Player | Date of birth (age) | Caps | Goals | Club |
|---|---|---|---|---|---|---|
| 1 | GK | Thaís Lima | 11 April 2008 (aged 18) | 0 | 0 | (Portuguese Football Federation) Benfica |
| 2 | DF | Thaynara | 20 March 2006 (aged 20) | 11 | 1 | (Brazilian Football Confederation) Botafogo |
| 3 | DF | Sofia Couto | 2 August 2007 (aged 19) | 10 | 0 | (Brazilian Football Confederation) Flamengo |
| 4 | DF | Ana Beatriz | 30 April 2006 (aged 20) | 7 | 0 | (Brazilian Football Confederation) São Paulo |
| 5 | MF | Emilly Lucas | 11 February 2007 (aged 19) | 6 | 0 | (Brazilian Football Confederation) Flamengo |
| 6 | DF | Bianca | 17 May 2006 (aged 20) | 9 | 0 | (Brazilian Football Confederation) Internacional |
| 7 | MF | Gisele | 20 May 2007 (aged 19) | 22 | 4 | (Brazilian Football Confederation) Grêmio |
| 8 | MF | Nogueira | 20 January 2008 (aged 18) | 8 | 3 | (Brazilian Football Confederation) Ferroviária |
| 9 | FW | Brendha | 17 December 2006 (aged 19) | 11 | 4 | (Brazilian Football Confederation) Flamengo |
| 10 | MF | Vitorinha | 20 November 2006 (aged 19) | 9 | 4 | (Brazilian Football Confederation) São Paulo |
| 11 | MF | Dudinha | 27 January 2006 (aged 20) | 9 | 1 | (Brazilian Football Confederation) Ferroviária |
| 12 | GK | Eluiza | 8 June 2006 (aged 20) | 10 | 0 | (Brazilian Football Confederation) São Paulo |
| 13 | MF | Dulce | 28 February 2008 (aged 18) | 0 | 0 | (Brazilian Football Confederation) Corinthians |
| 14 | MF | Kaylane | 8 December 2008 (aged 17) | 0 | 0 | (Brazilian Football Confederation) Flamengo |
| 15 | FW | Gio Canali | 12 February 2006 (aged 20) | 8 | 0 | (United States Soccer Federation) Virginia Cavaliers |
| 16 | MF | Clarinha | 16 January 2006 (aged 20) | 9 | 3 | (Portuguese Football Federation) Benfica |
| 17 | FW | Evelin | 8 April 2008 (aged 18) | 10 | 4 | (Brazilian Football Confederation) Santos |
| 18 | FW | Carioca | 26 February 2006 (aged 20) | 7 | 2 | (Brazilian Football Confederation) Fluminense |
| 19 | FW | Tainá | 30 November 2006 (aged 19) | 9 | 2 | (Brazilian Football Confederation) Ferroviária |
| 20 | MF | Aninha | 8 November 2007 (aged 18) | 0 | 0 | (Brazilian Football Confederation) Internacional |
| 21 | GK | Ana Morganti | 30 November 2008 (aged 17) | 1 | 0 | (Brazilian Football Confederation) Corinthians |

=== Canada ===
The final squad was announced on 20 August 2026.

Head coach: Cindy Tye

| No. | Pos. | Player | Date of birth (age) | Caps | Goals | Club |
|---|---|---|---|---|---|---|
| 1 | GK | Noelle Henning | 4 February 2007 (aged 19) | 0 | 0 | (United States Soccer Federation) Michigan State Spartans |
| 2 | DF | Inès Nourani | 18 May 2007 (aged 19) | 0 | 0 | (United States Soccer Federation) UConn Huskies |
| 3 | DF | Iba Oching | 28 November 2006 (aged 19) | 0 | 0 | (United States Soccer Federation) Iowa Hawkeyes |
| 4 | DF | Janet Okeke | 1 March 2006 (aged 20) | 0 | 0 | (United States Soccer Federation) NC State Wolfpack |
| 5 | DF | Stephanie Schoeley | 20 February 2006 (aged 20) | 0 | 0 | (United States Soccer Federation) Providence Friars |
| 6 | MF | Olivia Chisholm | 5 December 2008 (aged 17) | 0 | 0 | (Canadian Soccer Association) AFC Toronto |
| 7 | MF | Teegan Melenhorst | 31 August 2007 (aged 19) | 0 | 0 | (United States Soccer Federation) Miami Hurricanes |
| 8 | MF | Jeneva Hernandez Gray | 5 October 2006 (aged 19) | 0 | 0 | (Portuguese Football Federation) Sporting CP |
| 9 | FW | Annabelle Chukwu | 8 February 2007 (aged 19) | 0 | 0 | (United States Soccer Federation) Notre Dame Fighting Irish |
| 10 | FW | Kaylee Hunter | 22 January 2008 (aged 18) | 0 | 0 | (Canadian Soccer Association) AFC Toronto |
| 11 | FW | Léa Larouche | 20 January 2006 (aged 20) | 0 | 0 | (United States Soccer Federation) Iowa Hawkeyes |
| 12 | DF | Jadea Collin | 29 January 2006 (aged 20) | 0 | 0 | (United States Soccer Federation) Wisconsin Badgers |
| 13 | FW | Emma Yee | 28 August 2006 (aged 20) | 0 | 0 | (United States Soccer Federation) Illinois Fighting Illini |
| 14 | DF | Chloe Taylor | 2 September 2008 (aged 18) | 0 | 0 | (United States Soccer Federation) Auburn Tigers |
| 15 | DF | Bridget Mutipula | 5 August 2008 (aged 18) | 0 | 0 | (United States Soccer Federation) Florida State Seminoles |
| 16 | MF | Noelle Sather | 2 May 2006 (aged 20) | 0 | 0 | (United States Soccer Federation) Baylor Bears |
| 17 | FW | Liana Tarasco | 14 April 2007 (aged 19) | 0 | 0 | (United States Soccer Federation) Iowa Hawkeyes |
| 18 | GK | Khadijah Cissé | 18 May 2008 (aged 18) | 0 | 0 | (Royal Spanish Football Federation) Barcelona |
| 19 | FW | Sariyah Bailey | 17 April 2007 (aged 19) | 0 | 0 | (United States Soccer Federation) LSU Tigers |
| 20 | MF | Sienna Gibson | 18 September 2006 (aged 19) | 0 | 0 | (Canadian Soccer Association) UBC Thunderbirds |
| 21 | GK | Madison London | 22 August 2007 (aged 19) | 0 | 0 | (United States Soccer Federation) New Mexico Lobos |

=== England ===
The final squad was announced on 21 August 2026. On 30 August 2026, it was announced that Lauryn Thompson had withdrawn from the tournament squad due to injury; she was replaced by Layla Drury. On 4 September 2026, Erica Meg Parkinson withdrew to remain with her club North Carolina Courage; she was replaced by Vivienne Lia.

Head coach: Lydia Bedford

| No. | Pos. | Player | Date of birth (age) | Caps | Goals | Club |
|---|---|---|---|---|---|---|
| 1 | GK | Katie Cox | 28 April 2006 (aged 20) | | | (The Football Association) Nottingham Forest |
| 2 | DF | Ria Bose | 7 February 2006 (aged 20) | | | (The Football Association) West Ham United |
| 3 | DF | Chloe Sarwie | 19 December 2008 (aged 17) | | | (The Football Association) Chelsea |
| 4 | MF | May Cruft | 6 September 2009 (aged 16) | | | (Scottish Football Association) Rangers |
| 5 | DF | Zara Shaw | 6 June 2007 (aged 19) | | | (The Football Association) Liverpool |
| 6 | DF | Cecily Wellesley-Smith | 4 January 2007 (aged 19) | | | (Swedish Football Association) Rosengård |
| 7 | MF | Eleanor Klinger | 4 November 2006 (aged 19) | | | (United States Soccer Federation) Stanford Cardinal |
| 8 | FW | Vivienne Lia | 27 September 2006 (aged 19) | | | (German Football Association) Eintracht Frankfurt |
| 9 | FW | Princess Ademiluyi | 14 July 2006 (aged 20) | | | (The Football Association) Ipswich Town |
| 10 | MF | Lola Brown | 31 October 2007 (aged 18) | | | (The Football Association) Chelsea |
| 11 | MF | Vera Jones | 18 February 2008 (aged 18) | | | (The Football Association) Watford |
| 12 | DF | Rachel Maltby | 25 March 2007 (aged 19) | | | (The Football Association) Aston Villa |
| 13 | GK | Kaiya Jota | 25 August 2006 (aged 19) | | | (United States Soccer Federation) Stanford Cardinal |
| 14 | MF | Chloe Hylton | 25 April 2007 (aged 19) | | | (United States Soccer Federation) Carolina Ascent |
| 15 | DF | Lucy Newell | 2 October 2006 (aged 19) | | | (The Football Association) Manchester United |
| 16 | FW | Eva Hendle | 30 April 2008 (aged 18) | | | (Scottish Football Association) Rangers |
| 17 | FW | Layla Drury | 12 June 2009 (aged 17) | | | (The Football Association) Manchester United |
| 18 | FW | Lily Dent | 5 September 2006 (aged 20) | | | (The Football Association) Sunderland |
| 19 | FW | Jessie Gale | 23 August 2006 (aged 20) | | | (The Football Association) Newcastle United |
| 20 | DF | Sacha Lewis | 28 February 2008 (aged 18) | | | (The Football Association) Manchester City |
| 21 | GK | Eve Annets | 19 March 2006 (aged 20) | | | (Scottish Football Association) Hibernian |

=== Tanzania ===
Head coach: Bakari Shime

| No. | Pos. | Player | Date of birth (age) | Caps | Goals | Club |
|---|---|---|---|---|---|---|
| 1 | GK | Nusra Jafari | 20 December 2010 (aged 15) | 0 | 0 | (Tanzania Football Federation) Fountain Gate Princess |
| 2 | DF | Neema Damas | 16 April 2008 (aged 18) | 0 | 0 | (Tanzania Football Federation) JKT Queens |
| 3 | FW | Winfrida Gerald | 26 February 2008 (aged 18) | 0 | 0 | (Tanzania Football Federation) JKT Queens |
| 4 | MF | Lidya Kabambo | 27 November 2008 (aged 17) | 0 | 0 | (Tanzania Football Federation) JKT Queens |
| 5 | DF | Edina Makamba | 5 December 2008 (aged 17) | 0 | 0 | (Tanzania Football Federation) Tausi FC |
| 6 | MF | Elizabeth Mwimi | 23 June 2008 (aged 18) | 0 | 0 | (Tanzania Football Federation) Simba Queens |
| 7 | FW | Hasnath Ubamba | 8 July 2006 (aged 20) | 0 | 0 | (Tanzania Football Federation) Fountain Gate Princess |
| 8 | FW | Mary Siyame | 25 October 2008 (aged 17) | 0 | 0 | (Tanzania Football Federation) Fountain Gate Princess |
| 9 | FW | Bahati Kizanguzi | 24 October 2010 (aged 15) | 0 | 0 | (Tanzania Football Federation) Bunda Queens |
| 10 | MF | Winfrida Mathias | 20 October 2008 (aged 17) | 0 | 0 | (Tanzania Football Federation) Fountain Gate Princess |
| 11 | FW | Jamila Mnunduka | 10 November 2007 (aged 18) | 0 | 0 | (Tanzania Football Federation) JKT Queens |
| 12 | DF | Asha Ramadhani | 5 May 2009 (aged 17) | 0 | 0 | (Tanzania Football Federation) Simba Queens |
| 13 | MF | Alia Salum | 1 September 2006 (aged 20) | 0 | 0 | (Tanzania Football Federation) Simba Queens |
| 14 | MF | Christer Bazil | 17 September 2010 (aged 15) | 0 | 0 | (Tanzania Football Federation) JKT Queens |
| 15 | DF | Diana Mnally | 11 September 2006 (aged 19) | 0 | 0 | (Tanzania Football Federation) Yanga Princess |
| 16 | DF | Ester Marwa | 3 June 2008 (aged 18) | 0 | 0 | (Tanzania Football Federation) JKT Queens |
| 17 | DF | Veronica Mapunda | 27 August 2006 (aged 20) | 0 | 0 | (Tanzania Football Federation) Mashujaa Queens |
| 18 | GK | Mariam Manyerere | 12 May 2009 (aged 17) | 0 | 0 | (Tanzania Football Federation) Bunda Queens |
| 19 | DF | Milembe John | 14 March 2009 (aged 17) | 0 | 0 | (Tanzania Football Federation) Alliance Girls |
| 20 | GK | Rhobi Ngeya | 23 July 2010 (aged 16) | 0 | 0 | (Tanzania Football Federation) Alliance Girls |
| 21 | DF | Winfrida John | 26 March 2008 (aged 18) | 0 | 0 | (Tanzania Football Federation) Mashujaa Queens |

== Group C ==
=== Ecuador ===
Head coach: Eduardo Moscoso

| No. | Pos. | Player | Date of birth (age) | Caps | Goals | Club |
|---|---|---|---|---|---|---|
| 1 | GK | Domenica Palacios | 19 October 2007 (aged 18) | 0 | 0 | (Brazilian Football Confederation) Flamengo |
| 2 | DF | Noemi Camacho | 10 April 2007 (aged 19) | 0 | 0 | (Ecuadorian Football Federation) Universidad Católica |
| 3 | DF | Maite Zambrano | 13 October 2008 (aged 17) | 0 | 0 | (Ecuadorian Football Federation) Independiente del Valle |
| 4 | DF | Kathleen Mendoza | 19 July 2006 (aged 20) | 0 | 0 | (Ecuadorian Football Federation) Universidad Católica |
| 5 | MF | Evelyn Burgos | 19 April 2007 (aged 19) | 0 | 0 | (Ecuadorian Football Federation) Independiente del Valle |
| 6 | DF | Scarlet Garaicoa | 25 July 2008 (aged 18) | 0 | 0 | (Ecuadorian Football Federation) Barcelona |
| 7 | MF | Maritxell Cazares | 21 August 2006 (aged 20) | 0 | 0 | (Ecuadorian Football Federation) LDU Quito |
| 8 | MF | Fiorella Pico | 10 June 2007 (aged 19) | 0 | 0 | (Ecuadorian Football Federation) Independiente del Valle |
| 9 | FW | Domenica Arboleda | 25 May 2007 (aged 19) | 0 | 0 | (Italian Football Federation) AC Milan |
| 10 | FW | Mary Guerra | 7 March 2008 (aged 18) | 0 | 0 | (Ecuadorian Football Federation) Independiente del Valle |
| 11 | FW | Dariana Moran | 29 March 2007 (aged 19) | 0 | 0 | (Ecuadorian Football Federation) Independiente del Valle |
| 12 | GK | Maria Rodriguez | 28 October 2008 (aged 17) | 0 | 0 | (Ecuadorian Football Federation) Universidad Católica |
| 13 | FW | Josenka Velez | 4 July 2006 (aged 20) | 0 | 0 | (Ecuadorian Football Federation) LDU Quito |
| 14 | DF | Aireen Mogro | 18 May 2006 (aged 20) | 0 | 0 | (Ecuadorian Football Federation) Universidad Católica |
| 15 | MF | Karolina Villacis | 19 May 2008 (aged 18) | 0 | 0 | (Ecuadorian Football Federation) Independiente del Valle |
| 16 | FW | Xiomara Alcivar | 14 September 2008 (aged 17) | 0 | 0 | (Ecuadorian Football Federation) LDU Quito |
| 17 | MF | Erika Saltos | 28 April 2007 (aged 19) | 0 | 0 | (Ecuadorian Football Federation) Universidad Católica |
| 18 | MF | Rosa Flores | 26 June 2006 (aged 20) | 0 | 0 | (Ecuadorian Football Federation) LDU Quito |
| 19 | DF | Rosa Estupinan | 2 April 2008 (aged 18) | 0 | 0 | (Ecuadorian Football Federation) Independiente del Valle |
| 20 | FW | Emily Vargas | 7 June 2008 (aged 18) | 0 | 0 | (Ecuadorian Football Federation) Barcelona |
| 21 | GK | Dayarlin Alcivar | 25 May 2006 (aged 20) | 0 | 0 | (Ecuadorian Football Federation) LDU Quito |

=== France ===
The final squad was announced on 18 August 2026.

Head coach: Philippe Joly

| No. | Pos. | Player | Date of birth (age) | Caps | Goals | Club |
|---|---|---|---|---|---|---|
| 1 | GK | Alyssa Fernandes | 1 January 2006 (aged 20) | 0 | 0 | (French Football Federation) Toulouse |
| 2 | DF | Céleste Delcroix | 30 April 2006 (aged 20) | 0 | 0 | (French Football Federation) Saint-Étienne |
| 3 | DF | Chiara Baylet | 19 March 2007 (aged 19) | 0 | 0 | (French Football Federation) Montpellier |
| 4 | DF | Juliane Denizot | 15 October 2007 (aged 18) | 0 | 0 | (French Football Federation) Nantes |
| 5 | DF | Aude Bizet | 14 March 2006 (aged 20) | 0 | 0 | (French Football Federation) Fleury |
| 6 | MF | Kenza Roche Dufour | 3 August 2007 (aged 19) | 0 | 0 | (French Football Federation) Paris FC |
| 7 | MF | Clara Bertrand | 1 June 2006 (aged 20) | 0 | 0 | (French Football Federation) Lens |
| 8 | MF | Lina Gay | 17 November 2007 (aged 18) | 0 | 0 | (French Football Federation) Toulouse |
| 9 | FW | Célia Chabod | 28 February 2007 (aged 19) | 0 | 0 | (French Football Federation) Montpellier |
| 10 | FW | Ornella Graziani | 19 August 2007 (aged 19) | 0 | 0 | (French Football Federation) Paris Saint-Germain |
| 11 | FW | Justine Rouquet | 6 June 2007 (aged 19) | 0 | 0 | (French Football Federation) Montpellier |
| 12 | MF | Romane Rafalski | 3 March 2007 (aged 19) | 0 | 0 | (French Football Federation) Lyon |
| 13 | FW | Almudena Sierra | 27 April 2007 (aged 19) | 0 | 0 | (German Football Association) Hamburger SV |
| 14 | MF | Mariah Gueguen | 18 May 2006 (aged 20) | 0 | 0 | (Italian Football Federation) Parma |
| 15 | MF | Landryna Lushimba Bilombi | 14 March 2006 (aged 20) | 0 | 0 | (French Football Federation) Lens |
| 16 | GK | Ceylin Yilmaz | 9 March 2007 (aged 19) | 0 | 0 | (French Football Federation) Montpellier |
| 17 | MF | Kadidia Traore | 13 May 2006 (aged 20) | 0 | 0 | (French Football Federation) Paris FC |
| 18 | FW | Naomi Ekwalla | 20 October 2007 (aged 18) | 0 | 0 | (French Football Federation) Fleury |
| 19 | FW | Naolia Traore | 22 January 2006 (aged 20) | 0 | 0 | (French Football Federation) Paris Saint-Germain |
| 20 | MF | Louise Kleczewski | 9 May 2006 (aged 20) | 0 | 0 | (French Football Federation) US Saint-Malo |
| 21 | GK | Elisa Gautier | 25 August 2006 (aged 20) | 0 | 0 | (Royal Belgian Football Association) Standard Liège |

=== Ghana ===
Head coach: Charles Sampson

| No. | Pos. | Player | Date of birth (age) | Caps | Goals | Club |
|---|---|---|---|---|---|---|
| 1 | GK | Najat Salam | 10 March 2006 (aged 20) | 0 | 0 | (Ghana Football Association) Tamale Super Ladies |
| 2 | DF | Salma Naazo | 4 May 2007 (aged 19) | 0 | 0 | (Ghana Football Association) Savannah Ladies |
| 3 | MF | Latifa Musah | 25 July 2009 (aged 17) | 0 | 0 | (Ghana Football Association) Sissamba Ladies |
| 4 | DF | Diana Amoako | 2 February 2006 (aged 20) | 0 | 0 | (Ghana Football Association) Ampem Darkoa Ladies |
| 5 | DF | Rubby Osei | 30 October 2007 (aged 18) | 0 | 0 | (Ghana Football Association) Hasaacas Ladies |
| 6 | MF | Latifa Abesik | 2 December 2008 (aged 17) | 0 | 0 | (Ghana Football Association) Ampem Darkoa Ladies |
| 7 | FW | Jackline Ntoso | 11 April 2008 (aged 18) | 0 | 0 | (Ghana Football Association) Epiphany Warriors |
| 8 | MF | Esther Asamoah Yiadom | 10 July 2007 (aged 19) | 0 | 0 | (Ghana Football Association) Army Ladies |
| 9 | FW | Priscilla Mensah | 7 April 2009 (aged 17) | 0 | 0 | (Ghana Football Association) Sissamba Ladies |
| 10 | FW | Ruth Amponsah | 16 December 2008 (aged 17) | 0 | 0 | (United States Soccer Federation) Taft Rhinos |
| 11 | FW | Angel Akanyirige | 4 June 2006 (aged 20) | 0 | 0 | (United States Soccer Federation) Chicago State Cougars |
| 12 | FW | Ivy Osei Owusu | 9 October 2007 (aged 18) | 0 | 0 | (Ghana Football Association) Dreamz Ladies |
| 13 | FW | Jennifer Dawah | 10 April 2007 (aged 19) | 0 | 0 | (Ghana Football Association) Epiphany Warriors |
| 14 | DF | Alexandra Tay | 1 January 2007 (aged 19) | 0 | 0 | (United States Soccer Federation) Stanford Cardinal |
| 15 | DF | Margaret Agyapomaa | 5 May 2007 (aged 19) | 0 | 0 | (Ghana Football Association) Police Ladies |
| 16 | GK | Precious Akanguwie | 1 November 2010 (aged 15) | 0 | 0 | (Ghana Football Association) Hearts of Oak |
| 17 | MF | Sarah Nyarko | 24 November 2007 (aged 18) | 0 | 0 | (Ghana Football Association) Dreamz Ladies |
| 18 | FW | Agnes Yeboah | 29 May 2007 (aged 19) | 0 | 0 | (Chinese Football Association) Meizhou Hakka |
| 19 | DF | Juliana Gyekyewaa | 26 January 2009 (aged 17) | 0 | 0 | (Ghana Football Association) Rootz Sistaz |
| 20 | DF | Precious Asante | 6 February 2007 (aged 19) | 0 | 0 | (Ghana Football Association) Dreamz Ladies |
| 21 | GK | Ruth Agudu Sebbie | 11 October 2008 (aged 17) | 0 | 0 | (Ghana Football Association) Valued Girls |

=== South Korea ===
The final squad was announced on 11 August 2026.

Head coach: Park Youn-jeong

| No. | Pos. | Player | Date of birth (age) | Caps | Goals | Club |
|---|---|---|---|---|---|---|
| 1 | GK | Jeong Da-hee | 13 November 2006 (aged 19) | 0 | 0 | (Korea Football Association) Daeduk College |
| 2 | DF | Yoon Ah-yeong | 14 September 2007 (aged 18) | 0 | 0 | (Korea Football Association) Dankook University |
| 3 | DF | Cheon Si-woo | 9 August 2006 (aged 20) | 0 | 0 | (Korea Football Association) Ulsan College |
| 4 | DF | Jung Da-bin | 4 January 2006 (aged 20) | 0 | 0 | (Korea Football Association) Uiduk University |
| 5 | DF | Nam Seung-eun | 10 January 2006 (aged 20) | 0 | 0 | (Japan Football Association) Bunnys Gunma FC White Star |
| 6 | MF | Han Min-seo | 22 June 2006 (aged 20) | 0 | 0 | (Korea Football Association) Korea University |
| 7 | MF | Kim Yi-young | 15 September 2006 (aged 19) | 0 | 0 | (Korea Football Association) Ulsan College |
| 8 | MF | Jin Hye-rin | 29 June 2006 (aged 20) | 0 | 0 | (Korea Football Association) Korea University |
| 9 | FW | Lee Ha-eun | 21 January 2006 (aged 20) | 0 | 0 | (Korea Football Association) Ulsan College |
| 10 | FW | Lee Ha-eun | 20 July 2006 (aged 20) | 0 | 0 | (Korea Football Association) Uiduk University |
| 11 | FW | Jo Hye-young | 18 February 2006 (aged 20) | 0 | 0 | (Royal Spanish Football Federation) Madrid CFF |
| 12 | MF | Park Ji-yu | 6 September 2007 (aged 18) | 0 | 0 | (Korea Football Association) Ulsan College |
| 13 | DF | Maeng Hui-jin | 13 September 2006 (aged 19) | 0 | 0 | (Korea Football Association) Gangwon State University |
| 14 | FW | Shin Jee-yun | 18 December 2008 (aged 17) | 0 | 0 | (Korea Football Association) Ulsan Hyundai HS |
| 15 | FW | Park Ju-ha | 10 October 2007 (aged 18) | 0 | 0 | (Korea Football Association) Daekyeung University |
| 16 | MF | Choi Ju-hong | 23 July 2007 (aged 19) | 0 | 0 | (Korea Football Association) Daekyeung University |
| 17 | MF | Beom Ye-ju | 12 August 2007 (aged 19) | 0 | 0 | (Korea Football Association) Ulsan College |
| 18 | GK | Kim Chae-been | 14 April 2008 (aged 18) | 0 | 0 | (Korea Football Association) Gwangyang Girls' HS |
| 19 | FW | Kim Min-seo | 24 August 2009 (aged 17) | 0 | 0 | (Korea Football Association) Ulsan Hyundai HS |
| 20 | MF | Baek Seo-yeong | 16 May 2009 (aged 17) | 0 | 0 | (Korea Football Association) Gyeongnam Robot HS |
| 21 | GK | Kim Gyu-rin | 24 July 2007 (aged 19) | 0 | 0 | (Korea Football Association) Ulsan College |

== Group D ==
=== Italy ===
A preliminary 26-player squad was announced on 6 August 2026.

Head coach: Nicola Matteucci

| No. | Pos. | Player | Date of birth (age) | Caps | Goals | Club |
|---|---|---|---|---|---|---|
| 1 | GK | Elena Belli | 10 April 2006 (aged 20) | 0 | 0 | (Italian Football Federation) Inter Milan |
| 2 | DF | Lidia Consolini | 15 February 2007 (aged 19) | 0 | 0 | (Italian Football Federation) Inter Milan |
| 3 | DF | Caterina Venturelli | 15 October 2008 (aged 17) | 0 | 0 | (Italian Football Federation) Sassuolo |
| 4 | DF | Martina Cocino | 27 July 2006 (aged 20) | 0 | 0 | (Swiss Football Association) Aarau |
| 5 | DF | Azzurra Gallo | 20 May 2006 (aged 20) | 0 | 0 | (French Football Federation) Toulouse |
| 6 | MF | Maya Cherubini | 14 May 2007 (aged 19) | 0 | 0 | (Italian Football Federation) Fiorentina |
| 7 | FW | Giulia Galli | 23 March 2008 (aged 18) | 0 | 0 | (Italian Football Federation) Roma |
| 8 | MF | Paola Fadda | 5 January 2006 (aged 20) | 0 | 0 | (Italian Football Federation) Sassuolo |
| 9 | FW | Rosanna Ventriglia | 13 December 2007 (aged 18) | 0 | 0 | (Italian Football Federation) Ternana |
| 10 | FW | Giada Pellegrino Cimò | 7 October 2006 (aged 19) | 0 | 0 | (Italian Football Federation) Roma |
| 11 | FW | Karen Appiah | 23 September 2007 (aged 18) | 0 | 0 | (Italian Football Federation) Cesena |
| 12 | GK | Lavinia Tornaghi | 22 July 2006 (aged 20) | 0 | 0 | (Italian Football Federation) AC Milan |
| 13 | DF | Martina Tosello | 26 December 2007 (aged 18) | 0 | 0 | (Italian Football Federation) Cesena |
| 14 | MF | Sofia Testa | 5 July 2006 (aged 20) | 0 | 0 | (Italian Football Federation) Ternana |
| 15 | DF | Emma Lombardi | 20 September 2007 (aged 18) | 0 | 0 | (Italian Football Federation) Fiorentina |
| 16 | DF | Martina Bressan | 9 July 2008 (aged 18) | 0 | 0 | (Italian Football Federation) Inter Milan |
| 17 | MF | Marta Zamboni | 5 August 2006 (aged 20) | 0 | 0 | (Italian Football Federation) Como |
| 18 | MF | Giada Catena | 29 December 2006 (aged 19) | 0 | 0 | (Italian Football Federation) Res Roma |
| 19 | FW | Manuela Sciabica | 19 June 2006 (aged 20) | 0 | 0 | (Italian Football Federation) Lazio |
| 20 | FW | Gabriella Langella | 15 October 2007 (aged 18) | 0 | 0 | (Italian Football Federation) Napoli |
| 21 | GK | Erica Di Nallo | 5 January 2006 (aged 20) | 0 | 0 | (Italian Football Federation) Vicenza |

=== Japan ===
The final squad was announced on 18 August 2026.

Head coach: Akira Ijiri

| No. | Pos. | Player | Date of birth (age) | Caps | Goals | Club |
|---|---|---|---|---|---|---|
| 1 | GK | Uruha Iwasaki | 13 March 2006 (aged 20) | 0 | 0 | (Japan Football Association) Nojima Stella Kanagawa |
| 2 | DF | Yuna Aoki | 7 July 2008 (aged 18) | 0 | 0 | (Japan Football Association) Tokyo Verdy Beleza |
| 3 | DF | Tamami Aso | 26 October 2007 (aged 18) | 0 | 0 | (Japan Football Association) Tokyo Verdy Beleza |
| 4 | DF | Mitsuki Ota | 20 January 2007 (aged 19) | 0 | 0 | (Japan Football Association) INAC Kobe Leonessa |
| 5 | MF | Yura Honda | 1 February 2006 (aged 20) | 0 | 0 | (Japan Football Association) Nittaidai FC Ladies |
| 6 | MF | Asako Furuta | 23 April 2007 (aged 19) | 0 | 0 | (Japan Football Association) Tezukayama Gakuin University |
| 7 | MF | Miyu Matsunaga | 8 June 2006 (aged 20) | 0 | 0 | (Japan Football Association) Tokyo Verdy Beleza |
| 8 | MF | Rinka Higuchi | 9 May 2006 (aged 20) | 0 | 0 | (Japan Football Association) Chifure AS Elfen Saitama |
| 9 | FW | Natsumi Tago | 5 August 2006 (aged 20) | 0 | 0 | (Japan Football Association) Cerezo Osaka Yanmar |
| 10 | FW | Miku Matsuzawa | 9 November 2007 (aged 18) | 0 | 0 | (Japan Football Association) Kanagawa University |
| 11 | FW | Anon Tsuda | 8 November 2007 (aged 18) | 0 | 0 | (Japan Football Association) Mynavi Sendai |
| 12 | GK | Hinaha Ishida | 28 November 2006 (aged 19) | 0 | 0 | (Japan Football Association) Sanfrecce Hiroshima Regina |
| 13 | MF | Noa Fukushima | 12 December 2008 (aged 17) | 0 | 0 | (Japan Football Association) JFA Academy Fukushima |
| 14 | MF | Miharu Shinjo | 5 February 2007 (aged 19) | 0 | 0 | (Japan Football Association) Tokyo Verdy Beleza |
| 15 | DF | Haruko Suzuki | 11 January 2007 (aged 19) | 0 | 0 | (Japan Football Association) Nittaidai FC Ladies |
| 16 | DF | Hibari Hara | 17 May 2007 (aged 19) | 0 | 0 | (Japan Football Association) Chifure AS Elfen Saitama |
| 17 | DF | Momoka Sano | 17 April 2008 (aged 18) | 0 | 0 | (Japan Football Association) JFA Academy Fukushima |
| 18 | DF | Mone Sato | 15 November 2008 (aged 17) | 0 | 0 | (Japan Football Association) RB Omiya Ardija |
| 19 | MF | Yuka Kurimoto | 9 November 2006 (aged 19) | 0 | 0 | (Japan Football Association) Tsukuba University |
| 20 | MF | Konoha Nakamura | 27 July 2008 (aged 18) | 0 | 0 | (Japan Football Association) Cerezo Osaka Yanmar |
| 21 | GK | Sako Nawa | 29 August 2006 (aged 20) | 0 | 0 | (Japan Football Association) Cerezo Osaka Yanmar |

=== New Zealand ===
The final squad was announced on 17 August.

Head coach: Callum Holmes

| No. | Pos. | Player | Date of birth (age) | Club |
|---|---|---|---|---|
| 1 | GK | Brooke Neary | 14 October 2007 (aged 18) | (New Zealand Football) Wellington Phoenix |
| 2 | MF | Penny Brill | 11 July 2006 (aged 20) | (United States Soccer Federation) Xavier Musketeers |
| 3 | DF | Mackenzie Greene | 4 January 2006 (aged 20) | (New Zealand Football) Wellington Phoenix |
| 4 | DF | Charli Dunn | 20 March 2007 (aged 19) | (United States Soccer Federation) Middle Tennessee Blue Raiders |
| 5 | DF | Alyssha Eglinton | 16 January 2007 (aged 19) | (New Zealand Football) Wellington Phoenix |
| 6 | MF | Daisy Brazendale | 12 March 2006 (aged 20) | Free agent |
| 7 | MF | Grace Bartlett | 16 May 2007 (aged 19) | (New Zealand Football) Auckland United |
| 8 | MF | Charlotte Mortlock | 9 March 2006 (aged 20) | (Football Australia) Northern Tigers |
| 9 | FW | Pia Vlok | 4 September 2008 (aged 18) | (New Zealand Football) Wellington Phoenix |
| 10 | MF | Zoe Benson | 14 August 2006 (aged 20) | (New Zealand Football) Wellington Phoenix |
| 11 | FW | Emily Lyon | 17 July 2006 (aged 20) | (New Zealand Football) West Coast Rangers |
| 12 | GK | Scarlett Gray | 15 December 2007 (aged 18) | (Football Australia) Sydney University |
| 13 | DF | Freya Des Fountain | 7 February 2008 (aged 18) | (New Zealand Football) Wellington Phoenix |
| 14 | MF | Mikaela Bangalan | 30 March 2008 (aged 18) | (New Zealand Football) Wellington Phoenix |
| 15 | DF | Charley March | 11 April 2008 (aged 18) | (New Zealand Football) Auckland United |
| 16 | MF | Amber De Wit | 20 November 2007 (aged 18) | (United States Soccer Federation) North Dakota State Bison |
| 17 | MF | Grace Duncan | 3 April 2008 (aged 18) | (United States Soccer Federation) Washington Huskies |
| 18 | FW | Poppy O'Brien | 26 February 2007 (aged 19) | (United States Soccer Federation) Colorado State Rams |
| 19 | FW | Lily Brazendale | 6 May 2006 (aged 20) | (New Zealand Football) Wellington Phoenix |
| 20 | FW | Laura Bennett | 18 November 2008 (aged 17) | (New Zealand Football) Melville United |
| 21 | GK | Nienke Holland | 8 July 2010 (aged 16) | (Royal Dutch Football Association) AZ Alkmaar |

=== United States ===
The final squad was announced on 19 August 2026.

Head coach: (England) Vicky Jepson

| No. | Pos. | Player | Date of birth (age) | Caps | Goals | Club |
|---|---|---|---|---|---|---|
| 1 | GK | Caroline Birkel | 25 August 2006 (aged 20) | 6 | 0 | (United States Soccer Federation) Stanford Cardinal |
| 2 | DF | Aven Alvarez | 14 November 2006 (aged 19) | 8 | 0 | (United States Soccer Federation) North Carolina Tar Heels |
| 3 | DF | Emma Johnson | 30 July 2007 (aged 19) | 8 | 1 | (United States Soccer Federation) Penn State Nittany Lions |
| 4 | DF | Ella Bard | 21 March 2007 (aged 19) | 5 | 0 | (United States Soccer Federation) Louisville Cardinals |
| 5 | DF | Lizzie Boamah | 29 January 2006 (aged 20) | 5 | 0 | (United States Soccer Federation) Stanford Cardinal |
| 6 | MF | Ainsley McCammon | 16 August 2007 (aged 19) | 6 | 0 | (United States Soccer Federation) Seattle Reign |
| 7 | FW | Audrey McKeen | 26 November 2008 (aged 17) | 0 | 0 | (United States Soccer Federation) Racing Louisville |
| 8 | MF | Kennedy Fuller | 9 March 2007 (aged 19) | 5 | 1 | (United States Soccer Federation) Bay FC |
| 9 | FW | Alex Buck | 14 February 2006 (aged 20) | 4 | 2 | (United States Soccer Federation) Washington Huskies |
| 10 | MF | Linda Ullmark | 21 April 2006 (aged 20) | 6 | 6 | (United States Soccer Federation) Houston Dash |
| 11 | FW | Emeri Adames | 3 April 2006 (aged 20) | 15 | 2 | (United States Soccer Federation) Seattle Reign |
| 12 | GK | Evan O'Steen | 22 March 2008 (aged 18) | 2 | 0 | (United States Soccer Federation) Seattle Reign |
| 13 | DF | Katie Scott | 20 June 2007 (aged 19) | 11 | 1 | (United States Soccer Federation) Kansas City Current |
| 14 | DF | Hope Munson | 18 July 2006 (aged 20) | 5 | 0 | (United States Soccer Federation) North Carolina Tar Heels |
| 15 | DF | Pearl Cecil | 24 January 2008 (aged 18) | 1 | 0 | (United States Soccer Federation) Virginia Cavaliers |
| 16 | MF | Y-Lan Nguyen | 2 June 2007 (aged 19) | 4 | 0 | (United States Soccer Federation) Stanford Cardinal |
| 17 | FW | Micayla Johnson | 18 January 2008 (aged 18) | 7 | 3 | (United States Soccer Federation) Chicago Stars |
| 18 | MF | Nyanya Touray | 25 July 2008 (aged 18) | 4 | 0 | (United States Soccer Federation) Florida State Seminoles |
| 19 | FW | Sealey Strawn | 1 October 2007 (aged 18) | 6 | 1 | (United States Soccer Federation) Dallas Trinity |
| 20 | FW | Lily Joseph | 15 August 2006 (aged 20) | 1 | 0 | (United States Soccer Federation) Notre Dame Fighting Irish |
| 21 | GK | Kealey Titmuss | 15 September 2006 (aged 19) | 3 | 0 | (United States Soccer Federation) Penn State Nittany Lions |

== Group E ==
=== Colombia ===
Head coach: Carlos Paniagua

| No. | Pos. | Player | Date of birth (age) | Caps | Goals | Club |
|---|---|---|---|---|---|---|
| 1 | GK | Luisa Agudelo | 27 March 2007 (aged 19) | 0 | 0 | (United States Soccer Federation) San Diego Wave |
| 2 | DF | Sara Bohórquez | 30 October 2006 (aged 19) | 0 | 0 | (Colombian Football Federation) Fortaleza |
| 3 | DF | Lina Arboleda | 5 August 2006 (aged 20) | 0 | 0 | (Colombian Football Federation) Millonarios |
| 4 | DF | Mercedes Martinez | 15 August 2007 (aged 19) | 0 | 0 | (Colombian Football Federation) Fortaleza |
| 5 | DF | Maria Torres | 1 September 2006 (aged 20) | 0 | 0 | (Colombian Football Federation) Independiente Medellín |
| 6 | MF | Brenda Cardona | 26 October 2008 (aged 17) | 0 | 0 | (Colombian Football Federation) Independiente Santa Fe |
| 7 | MF | Isabella Diaz | 17 November 2007 (aged 18) | 0 | 0 | (Colombian Football Federation) Independiente Santa Fe |
| 8 | MF | Mariana Mosquera | 18 April 2007 (aged 19) | 0 | 0 | (Colombian Football Federation) Atlético Nacional |
| 9 | FW | Valerin Loboa | 3 July 2007 (aged 19) | 0 | 0 | (United States Soccer Federation) Portland Thorns |
| 10 | MF | Mariana Silva | 21 August 2007 (aged 19) | 0 | 0 | (Royal Spanish Football Federation) Madrid CFF |
| 11 | FW | Maithe Lopez | 24 January 2007 (aged 19) | 0 | 0 | (Canadian Soccer Association) Vancouver Rise |
| 12 | GK | Jimena Ospina | 26 October 2006 (aged 19) | 0 | 0 | (Colombian Football Federation) Cortuluá |
| 13 | MF | Isabel Weiner | 6 February 2007 (aged 19) | 0 | 0 | (United States Soccer Federation) Columbia Lions |
| 14 | DF | Fernanda Viafara | 22 July 2006 (aged 20) | 0 | 0 | (Colombian Football Federation) Millonarios |
| 15 | DF | Samantha Rodriguez | 8 October 2007 (aged 18) | 0 | 0 | (Colombian Football Federation) Atlético Bucaramanga |
| 16 | MF | Juana Ortegón | 6 August 2006 (aged 20) | 0 | 0 | (Colombian Football Federation) Independiente Santa Fe |
| 17 | DF | Alejandra Baldovino | 15 December 2008 (aged 17) | 0 | 0 | (Colombian Football Federation) Junior |
| 18 | MF | Catalina Cortes | 27 May 2006 (aged 20) | 0 | 0 | (Colombian Football Federation) América de Cali |
| 19 | DF | Sintia Cabezas | 1 May 2006 (aged 20) | 0 | 0 | (French Football Federation) Marseille |
| 20 | DF | Sofia Ortiz | 10 May 2008 (aged 18) | 0 | 0 | (Colombian Football Federation) América de Cali |
| 21 | GK | Saray Marin | 26 January 2007 (aged 19) | 0 | 0 | (Colombian Football Federation) América de Cali |

=== Costa Rica ===
Head coach: Ana Aguilar

| No. | Pos. | Player | Date of birth (age) | Caps | Goals | Club |
|---|---|---|---|---|---|---|
| 1 | GK | Valeria Fernandez | 18 March 2008 (aged 18) | 0 | 0 | (Costa Rican Football Federation) Municipal Pococí |
| 2 | DF | Brittany Vasquez | 21 August 2006 (aged 20) | 0 | 0 | (Costa Rican Football Federation) Dimas Escazú |
| 3 | DF | Josselyn Briceño | 24 September 2006 (aged 19) | 0 | 0 | (Argentine Football Association) Talleres |
| 4 | DF | Tiara Ruiz | 18 February 2009 (aged 17) | 0 | 0 | (Costa Rican Football Federation) Alajuelense |
| 5 | DF | Fabiana Alfaro | 23 May 2008 (aged 18) | 0 | 0 | (Costa Rican Football Federation) Alajuelense |
| 6 | MF | Isska Chaverri | 20 May 2009 (aged 17) | 0 | 0 | (Costa Rican Football Federation) Saprissa |
| 7 | FW | Lucia Paniagua | 27 November 2009 (aged 16) | 0 | 0 | (Costa Rican Football Federation) Sporting FC |
| 8 | MF | Daniela Ocampo | 16 July 2008 (aged 18) | 0 | 0 | (United States Soccer Federation) UCF Knights |
| 9 | FW | Miranda Solis | 28 February 2008 (aged 18) | 0 | 0 | (Costa Rican Football Federation) Alajuelense |
| 10 | MF | Sheika Scott | 22 October 2006 (aged 19) | 0 | 0 | (French Football Federation) Paris FC |
| 11 | FW | Nubia Medina | 7 August 2010 (aged 16) | 0 | 0 | (Costa Rican Football Federation) Surf Fútbol Costa Rica |
| 12 | DF | Samantha Pitty | 19 June 2006 (aged 20) | 0 | 0 | (Costa Rican Football Federation) Saprissa |
| 13 | GK | Meylin Castro | 24 July 2009 (aged 17) | 0 | 0 | (Costa Rican Football Federation) Saprissa |
| 14 | FW | Kiana Lopez | 22 June 2008 (aged 18) | 0 | 0 | (United States Soccer Federation) Alabama FC |
| 15 | DF | Fabiana Mendoza | 28 November 2008 (aged 17) | 0 | 0 | (Costa Rican Football Federation) Municipal Pococí |
| 16 | DF | Karol Molina | 12 January 2008 (aged 18) | 0 | 0 | (Costa Rican Football Federation) Alajuelense |
| 17 | MF | Marian Solano | 19 May 2006 (aged 20) | 0 | 0 | (Costa Rican Football Federation) Sporting FC |
| 18 | GK | Ashley Quesada | 9 June 2009 (aged 17) | 0 | 0 | (Costa Rican Football Federation) Sporting FC |
| 19 | DF | Rihanna Solano | 14 July 2008 (aged 18) | 0 | 0 | (Costa Rican Football Federation) Saprissa |
| 20 | MF | Raquel Recio | 5 March 2008 (aged 18) | 0 | 0 | (Costa Rican Football Federation) Sporting FC |
| 21 | FW | Yeslim Alvarado | 13 April 2007 (aged 19) | 0 | 0 | (Costa Rican Football Federation) Alajuelense |

=== North Korea ===
Head coach: Han Chol-hak

| No. | Pos. | Player | Date of birth (age) | Caps | Goals | Club |
|---|---|---|---|---|---|---|
| 1 | GK | Pak Ju-gyong | 7 November 2007 (aged 18) | 0 | 0 | (DPR Korea Football Association) Naegohyang |
| 2 | DF | Ri Pom | 3 March 2007 (aged 19) | 0 | 0 | (DPR Korea Football Association) Naegohyang |
| 3 | DF | Jong Pok-yong | 20 January 2007 (aged 19) | 0 | 0 | (DPR Korea Football Association) April 25 |
| 4 | DF | Kim Yon-a | 7 February 2008 (aged 18) | 0 | 0 | (DPR Korea Football Association) Sobaeksu |
| 5 | DF | Ri Ye-gyong | 10 November 2007 (aged 18) | 0 | 0 | (DPR Korea Football Association) April 25 |
| 6 | FW | Pak Ok-i | 12 April 2007 (aged 19) | 0 | 0 | (DPR Korea Football Association) Sobaeksu |
| 7 | MF | Jon Il-chong | 12 March 2007 (aged 19) | 0 | 0 | (DPR Korea Football Association) Amrokgang |
| 8 | MF | So Ryu-gyong | 10 November 2007 (aged 18) | 0 | 0 | (DPR Korea Football Association) Amrokgang |
| 9 | FW | Ri Su-jong | 7 January 2007 (aged 19) | 0 | 0 | (DPR Korea Football Association) Naegohyang |
| 10 | MF | Choe Yon-a | 1 January 2007 (aged 19) | 0 | 0 | (DPR Korea Football Association) Naegohyang |
| 11 | MF | Choe Rim-jong | 27 January 2007 (aged 19) | 0 | 0 | (DPR Korea Football Association) Amrokgang |
| 12 | FW | Kang Ryu-mi | 20 September 2007 (aged 18) | 0 | 0 | (DPR Korea Football Association) Rimyongsu |
| 13 | FW | Ho Kyong | 28 February 2007 (aged 19) | 0 | 0 | (DPR Korea Football Association) Sobaeksu |
| 14 | DF | Pak Il-sim | 20 May 2007 (aged 19) | 0 | 0 | (DPR Korea Football Association) Amrokgang |
| 15 | DF | Choe Chong-gum | 15 September 2007 (aged 18) | 0 | 0 | (DPR Korea Football Association) April 25 |
| 16 | MF | Yom Chol-nim | 13 January 2007 (aged 19) | 0 | 0 | (DPR Korea Football Association) Wolmido |
| 17 | DF | Ri Kuk-hyang | 7 October 2007 (aged 18) | 0 | 0 | (DPR Korea Football Association) Naegohyang |
| 18 | GK | Choe Kyong-mi | 17 July 2007 (aged 19) | 0 | 0 | (DPR Korea Football Association) Amrokgang |
| 19 | MF | Ro Un-hyang | 18 May 2007 (aged 19) | 0 | 0 | (DPR Korea Football Association) Naegohyang |
| 20 | MF | An Kyong-yong | 27 August 2007 (aged 19) | 0 | 0 | (DPR Korea Football Association) April 25 |
| 21 | GK | Ri Ok | 5 January 2006 (aged 20) | 0 | 0 | (DPR Korea Football Association) April 25 |

=== Portugal ===
Head coach: Marisa Gomes

| No. | Pos. | Player | Date of birth (age) | Caps | Goals | Club |
|---|---|---|---|---|---|---|
| 1 | GK | Nair Pina | 25 November 2006 (aged 19) | 0 | 0 | (Portuguese Football Federation) Braga |
| 2 | DF | Iara Lobo | 16 January 2008 (aged 18) | 0 | 0 | (Italian Football Federation) Parma |
| 3 | DF | Inês Meninas | 16 May 2006 (aged 20) | 0 | 0 | (Portuguese Football Federation) Benfica |
| 4 | DF | Érica Cancelinha | 26 December 2006 (aged 19) | 0 | 0 | (Portuguese Football Federation) Sporting CP |
| 5 | DF | Francisca Castro | 10 July 2008 (aged 18) | 0 | 0 | (Portuguese Football Federation) Braga |
| 6 | MF | Joana Valente | 3 January 2007 (aged 19) | 0 | 0 | (Portuguese Football Federation) Benfica |
| 7 | MF | Marta Gago | 24 January 2006 (aged 20) | 0 | 0 | (Portuguese Football Federation) Vitória |
| 8 | FW | Anna Marques | 27 May 2006 (aged 20) | 0 | 0 | (German Football Association) VfL Bochum |
| 9 | FW | Maisa Correia | 11 October 2006 (aged 19) | 0 | 0 | (Portuguese Football Federation) Sporting CP |
| 10 | MF | Mafalda Mariano | 3 January 2006 (aged 20) | 0 | 0 | (Portuguese Football Federation) Vitória |
| 11 | FW | Carolina Santiago | 31 August 2006 (aged 20) | 0 | 0 | (Portuguese Football Federation) Sporting CP |
| 12 | GK | Beatriz Carvalho | 21 November 2008 (aged 17) | 0 | 0 | (Portuguese Football Federation) Porto |
| 13 | MF | Rita Cunha | 24 August 2006 (aged 20) | 0 | 0 | (Portuguese Football Federation) Braga |
| 14 | DF | Filipa Ribeiro | 15 April 2006 (aged 20) | 0 | 0 | (Portuguese Football Federation) Rio Ave |
| 15 | MF | Carolina Tristão | 20 November 2008 (aged 17) | 0 | 0 | (Portuguese Football Federation) Benfica |
| 16 | FW | Neide Guedes | 18 July 2006 (aged 20) | 0 | 0 | (Portuguese Football Federation) Benfica |
| 17 | FW | Diana Costa | 25 May 2006 (aged 20) | 0 | 0 | (Portuguese Football Federation) Benfica |
| 18 | DF | Carolina Simões | 13 March 2008 (aged 18) | 0 | 0 | (Portuguese Football Federation) Benfica |
| 19 | FW | Luana Bessa | 24 January 2008 (aged 18) | 0 | 0 | (Portuguese Football Federation) Braga |
| 20 | MF | Rita Melo | 7 December 2007 (aged 18) | 0 | 0 | (Portuguese Football Federation) Braga |
| 21 | GK | Rafaela Mendonça | 1 February 2007 (aged 19) | 0 | 0 | (French Football Federation) Paris FC |

== Group F ==
=== China ===
Head coach: Wang Jun

| No. | Pos. | Player | Date of birth (age) | Caps | Goals | Club |
|---|---|---|---|---|---|---|
| 1 | GK | Liu Chen | 30 June 2006 (aged 20) | 0 | 0 | (Chinese Football Association) Beijing Chengjian |
| 2 | DF | Wang Dantong | 22 April 2007 (aged 19) | 0 | 0 | (Chinese Football Association) Hebei WFC |
| 3 | DF | Yuan Suwan | 28 December 2007 (aged 18) | 0 | 0 | (Chinese Football Association) Shanghai Shengli |
| 4 | DF | Huang Jiaxin | 25 January 2006 (aged 20) | 0 | 0 | (Chinese Football Association) Shanghai Shengli |
| 5 | DF | Ye Tong | 5 October 2006 (aged 19) | 0 | 0 | (Chinese Football Association) Liaoning Shenbei Hefeng |
| 6 | MF | Xue Sifan | 20 December 2007 (aged 18) | 0 | 0 | (Chinese Football Association) Shanghai Shengli |
| 7 | MF | Ouyang Yuhuan | 21 March 2006 (aged 20) | 0 | 0 | (Chinese Football Association) Wuhan Jiangda |
| 8 | MF | Song Lijuan | 29 March 2008 (aged 18) | 0 | 0 | (Chinese Football Association) HNFA |
| 9 | FW | Lu Jiayu | 18 January 2006 (aged 20) | 0 | 0 | (Chinese Football Association) Beijing Chengjian |
| 10 | FW | Zhou Xinyi | 26 February 2008 (aged 18) | 0 | 0 | (Chinese Football Association) Shanghai Shengli |
| 11 | MF | Yu Xingyue | 24 December 2006 (aged 19) | 0 | 0 | (Chinese Football Association) Pingguo Beinong |
| 12 | GK | Guo Xinyu | 14 March 2006 (aged 20) | 0 | 0 | (Chinese Football Association) Jiangsu |
| 13 | MF | Chen Ziyi | 28 September 2007 (aged 18) | 0 | 0 | (Chinese Football Association) Shanghai Shengli |
| 14 | DF | Mao Kexin | 29 June 2007 (aged 19) | 0 | 0 | (Chinese Football Association) Beijing Chengjian |
| 15 | FW | Luo Luo | 12 October 2006 (aged 19) | 0 | 0 | (Chinese Football Association) Wuhan Jiangda |
| 16 | DF | Li Chenyu | 29 November 2007 (aged 18) | 0 | 0 | (Chinese Football Association) Shanghai Shengli |
| 17 | MF | Chen Ruilin | 12 May 2008 (aged 18) | 0 | 0 | (Chinese Football Association) Shanghai Shengli |
| 18 | MF | Xiao Yafei | 28 May 2007 (aged 19) | 0 | 0 | (Chinese Football Association) Shandong Jinghua |
| 19 | DF | Zeng Yujia | 7 July 2006 (aged 20) | 0 | 0 | (Chinese Football Association) Beijing Chengjian |
| 20 | FW | Yu Jiaqi | 4 April 2006 (aged 20) | 0 | 0 | (Chinese Football Association) Jiangsu |
| 21 | GK | Hou Shumei | 30 December 2007 (aged 18) | 0 | 0 | (Chinese Football Association) Liaoning Shenbei Hefeng |

=== New Caledonia ===
The final squad was announced on 14 August 2026.

Head coach: Léon Waitronyie

| No. | Pos. | Player | Date of birth (age) | Caps | Goals | Club |
|---|---|---|---|---|---|---|
| 1 | GK | Elizabeth Aben | 5 February 2008 (aged 18) | 0 | 0 | (New Caledonian Football Federation) Wetr |
| 2 | DF | Léana Hmae | 25 January 2008 (aged 18) | 0 | 0 | (New Caledonian Football Federation) Wetr |
| 3 | MF | Valérie Ngazo | 3 August 2008 (aged 18) | 0 | 0 | (New Caledonian Football Federation) Drehu |
| 4 | DF | Kenza Kenon | 3 May 2008 (aged 18) | 0 | 0 | (New Caledonian Football Federation) Païta |
| 5 | DF | Shirley Wenessia | 30 May 2007 (aged 19) | 0 | 0 | (New Caledonian Football Federation) AS Academy |
| 6 | MF | Kheimera Gondou | 20 October 2008 (aged 17) | 0 | 0 | (New Caledonian Football Federation) Païta |
| 7 | FW | Aziliz Naaoutchoue | 3 December 2008 (aged 17) | 0 | 0 | (New Caledonian Football Federation) Païta |
| 8 | MF | Lili Waheo | 20 August 2007 (aged 19) | 0 | 0 | (New Caledonian Football Federation) Ne Drehu |
| 9 | FW | Juila Honakoko | 21 August 2007 (aged 19) | 0 | 0 | (New Caledonian Football Federation) Wetr |
| 10 | FW | Joceline Kourevi | 20 February 2007 (aged 19) | 0 | 0 | (New Caledonian Football Federation) Drehu |
| 11 | FW | Kané Dralu | 22 August 2008 (aged 18) | 0 | 0 | (New Caledonian Football Federation) Drehu |
| 12 | MF | Matha Bako | 24 June 2009 (aged 17) | 0 | 0 | (New Caledonian Football Federation) Wetr |
| 13 | DF | Emmanuelle Buama | 28 May 2009 (aged 17) | 0 | 0 | (New Caledonian Football Federation) AS Academy |
| 14 | FW | Joyce Angexetine | 20 October 2008 (aged 17) | 0 | 0 | (New Caledonian Football Federation) Drehu |
| 15 | MF | Alesié Adjou | 22 March 2008 (aged 18) | 0 | 0 | (New Caledonian Football Federation) Drehu |
| 16 | GK | Muneiko Waheo | 20 February 2007 (aged 19) | 0 | 0 | (New Caledonian Football Federation) Ne Drehu |
| 17 | MF | Deyanera Michel | 26 December 2006 (aged 19) | 0 | 0 | (New Caledonian Football Federation) Drehu |
| 18 | DF | Louane Pocoue | 7 October 2006 (aged 19) | 0 | 0 | (New Caledonian Football Federation) Wetr |
| 19 | DF | Laurenda Simane | 3 June 2006 (aged 20) | 0 | 0 | (New Caledonian Football Federation) Drehu |
| 21 | GK | Kélia Golitin | 2 October 2008 (aged 17) | 0 | 0 | (New Caledonian Football Federation) Païta |

=== Nigeria ===
The final squad was announced on 30 August 2026.

Head coach: Moses Aduku

| No. | Pos. | Player | Date of birth (age) | Caps | Goals | Club |
|---|---|---|---|---|---|---|
| 1 | GK | Christiana Uzoma | 20 December 2008 (aged 17) | 0 | 0 | (Nigeria Football Federation) Edo Queens |
| 2 | MF | Favour Nkwocha | 27 April 2009 (aged 17) | 0 | 0 | (Nigeria Football Federation) FC Robo |
| 3 | DF | Victory Lucky | 21 September 2008 (aged 17) | 0 | 0 | (Nigeria Football Federation) Sunshine Queens |
| 4 | DF | Onyedikachi Ekezie | 3 December 2007 (aged 18) | 0 | 0 | (Nigeria Football Federation) Abia Angels |
| 5 | FW | Winner Onajite David | 11 June 2007 (aged 19) | 0 | 0 | (Nigeria Football Federation) Abia Angels |
| 6 | FW | Queen Joseph | 24 November 2009 (aged 16) | 0 | 0 | (Nigeria Football Federation) FOSLA Academy |
| 7 | DF | Jumai Adebayo | 1 April 2008 (aged 18) | 0 | 0 | (Nigeria Football Federation) Rivers Angels |
| 8 | FW | Ramotalahi Kareem | 12 October 2007 (aged 18) | 0 | 0 | (Nigeria Football Federation) Rivers Angels |
| 9 | FW | Chisom Nwachukwu | 7 February 2008 (aged 18) | 0 | 0 | (Nigeria Football Federation) Rivers Angels |
| 10 | MF | Kafayat Mafisere | 21 May 2006 (aged 20) | 0 | 0 | (Nigeria Football Federation) Edo Queens |
| 11 | FW | Folajomi Olabiyi | 10 May 2007 (aged 19) | 0 | 0 | (Nigeria Football Federation) Bayelsa Queens |
| 12 | MF | Tosin Rafiu | 8 June 2010 (aged 16) | 0 | 0 | (Nigeria Football Federation) FC Robo |
| 13 | MF | Rebecca Adegbemile | 22 November 2007 (aged 18) | 0 | 0 | (Nigeria Football Federation) Edo Queens |
| 14 | FW | Mary Mamudu | 16 September 2007 (aged 18) | 0 | 0 | (Nigeria Football Federation) Edo Queens |
| 15 | FW | Precious Oscar | 7 October 2009 (aged 16) | 0 | 0 | (Nigeria Football Federation) Edo Queens |
| 16 | DF | Tumininu Adeshina | 22 April 2006 (aged 20) | 0 | 0 | (Nigeria Football Federation) Edo Queens |
| 17 | GK | Jane Ijirigho | 31 August 2009 (aged 17) | 0 | 0 | (Nigeria Football Federation) Nasarawa Amazons |
| 18 | FW | Janet Akekoromowei | 6 November 2007 (aged 18) | 0 | 0 | (Portuguese Football Federation) Benfica |
| 19 | MF | Amber Ogbolu | 14 November 2007 (aged 18) | 0 | 0 | (United States Soccer Federation) Oregon State Beavers |
| 20 | DF | Hannah Ibrahim | 7 July 2008 (aged 18) | 0 | 0 | (Nigeria Football Federation) Remo Queens |
| 21 | GK | Bright Effiong Etim | 5 October 2007 (aged 18) | 0 | 0 | (Nigeria Football Federation) Sunshine Queens |

=== Spain ===
A preliminary squad was announced on 16 August 2026. The final squad was announced on 20 August 2026.

Head coach: David Aznar

| No. | Pos. | Player | Date of birth (age) | Caps | Goals | Club |
|---|---|---|---|---|---|---|
| 1 | GK | Laia López | 29 January 2007 (aged 19) | | | (Royal Spanish Football Federation) Real Madrid |
| 2 | DF | Noa Jiménez | 28 March 2008 (aged 18) | | | (Royal Spanish Football Federation) Barcelona |
| 3 | DF | Julia Torres | 15 January 2009 (aged 17) | | | (Royal Spanish Football Federation) Barcelona |
| 4 | DF | Silvia Cristóbal | 1 May 2008 (aged 18) | | | (Royal Spanish Football Federation) Real Madrid |
| 5 | DF | Amaya García | 10 June 2007 (aged 19) | | | (Royal Spanish Football Federation) Deportivo Alavés |
| 6 | MF | Irune Dorado | 22 March 2008 (aged 18) | | | (Royal Spanish Football Federation) Real Madrid |
| 7 | DF | Noemí Bejarano | 27 June 2006 (aged 20) | | | (Royal Spanish Football Federation) Real Madrid |
| 8 | MF | Elene Gurtubay | 3 October 2007 (aged 18) | | | (Royal Spanish Football Federation) Athletic Bilbao |
| 9 | FW | Marísa García | 22 June 2006 (aged 20) | | | (Royal Spanish Football Federation) Deportivo A Coruña |
| 10 | MF | Cristina Librán | 11 January 2006 (aged 20) | | | (Italian Football Federation) Juventus |
| 11 | FW | Daniela Agote | 27 August 2006 (aged 20) | | | (Royal Spanish Football Federation) Athletic Bilbao |
| 12 | DF | Aïcha Cámara | 11 December 2006 (aged 19) | | | (Royal Spanish Football Federation) Barcelona |
| 13 | GK | Anna Álvarez | 17 January 2008 (aged 18) | | | (Royal Spanish Football Federation) Levante |
| 14 | MF | Ainoa Gómez | 13 April 2007 (aged 19) | | | (Royal Spanish Football Federation) Deportivo A Coruña |
| 15 | MF | Natalia Peñalvo | 23 November 2006 (aged 19) | | | (Royal Spanish Football Federation) Atlético Madrid |
| 16 | MF | Rosalía Domínguez | 11 October 2008 (aged 17) | | | (Royal Spanish Football Federation) Barcelona |
| 17 | DF | Carla Julià | 14 December 2006 (aged 19) | | | (Royal Spanish Football Federation) Barcelona |
| 18 | FW | Celia Segura | 10 March 2007 (aged 19) | | | (Royal Spanish Football Federation) Atlético Madrid |
| 19 | FW | Alba Cerrato | 1 January 2007 (aged 19) | | | (Italian Football Federation) Fiorentina |
| 20 | FW | Paula Comendador | 12 January 2007 (aged 19) | | | (Royal Spanish Football Federation) Real Madrid |
| 21 | GK | Alazne Estensoro | 5 June 2006 (aged 19) | | | (Royal Spanish Football Federation) Real Sociedad |
