= 2026 UEFA Women's Under-19 Championship squads =

Player listing of women's football competition

Each national team submitted a squad of 20 players, two of whom had to be goalkeepers.

Players born on or after 1 January 2007 were eligible to participate. The age listed for each player is their age as of 27 June 2026, the first day of the tournament.

== Group A ==
=== Bosnia and Herzegovina ===
The final squad was announced on 15 June 2026.

Head coach: Jelena Milović

No.	Pos.	Player	Date of birth (age)	Club
1	GK	Nadija Golubović	21 April 2007 (aged 19)	(Football Association of Bosnia and Herzegovina) SFK 2000
12	GK	Hana Karačić	19 January 2009 (aged 17)	(Football Association of Bosnia and Herzegovina) SFK 2000
2	DF	Marija Mihaela Maslać	1 December 2008 (aged 17)	(Football Association of Bosnia and Herzegovina) Leotar Trebinje
3	DF	Ariana Hafizović	15 April 2008 (aged 18)	(Norwegian Football Federation) Strømsgodset
4	DF	Dragana Marinković	24 May 2007 (aged 19)	(Football Association of Bosnia and Herzegovina) Radnik Bijeljina
5	DF	Natalija Mirković	8 November 2007 (aged 18)	(Football Association of Bosnia and Herzegovina) SFK 2000
6	DF	Bogdana Milićević	16 March 2007 (aged 19)	(Football Association of Bosnia and Herzegovina) Radnik Bijeljina
11	DF	Anđelina Laketić	1 November 2007 (aged 18)	(Football Association of Bosnia and Herzegovina) Radnik Bijeljina
19	DF	Nađa Ćerić	13 July 2008 (aged 17)	(Norwegian Football Federation) KFUM Kvinner Oslo
7	MF	Zerina Marković	9 March 2007 (aged 19)	(United States Soccer Federation) Memphis Tigers
8	MF	Uma Hadžihajdarević	6 May 2008 (aged 18)	(Football Association of Bosnia and Herzegovina) SFK 2000
10	MF	Una Rankić	26 November 2007 (aged 18)	(Swiss Football Association) Basel
13	MF	Laureen Scharfenberg	10 May 2008 (aged 18)	(German Football Association) Freiburg
17	MF	Amina Krpo	25 May 2008 (aged 18)	(Norwegian Football Federation) Vålerenga
18	MF	Hana Mešan	26 August 2009 (aged 16)	(Football Association of Bosnia and Herzegovina) SFK 2000
20	MF	Amila Abdukić	22 July 2007 (aged 18)	(Football Association of Bosnia and Herzegovina) SFK 2000
9	FW	Irina Erkić	30 September 2007 (aged 18)	(Football Association of Bosnia and Herzegovina) Radnik Bijeljina
14	FW	Ana Jurić	17 July 2008 (aged 17)	(Football Association of Bosnia and Herzegovina) Leotar Trebinje
15	FW	Velida Aličković	5 April 2008 (aged 18)	(German Football Association) Mainz
16	FW	Sara Mujdžić	28 October 2008 (aged 17)	(French Football Federation) Saint-Étienne

=== Germany ===
The final squad was announced on 12 June 2026.

Head coach: Melanie Behringer

No.	Pos.	Player	Date of birth (age)	Club
1	GK	Janne Krumme	22 May 2007 (aged 19)	(German Football Association) Eintracht
12	GK	Nelly Smolarczyk	19 March 2007 (aged 19)	(German Football Association) Wolfsburg
3	DF	Lenelotte Müller	10 May 2008 (aged 18)	(German Football Association) Stuttgart
4	DF	Lina Száraz	10 March 2008 (aged 18)	(German Football Association) Köln
5	DF	Luzie Zähringer	10 May 2008 (aged 18)	(German Football Association) Bayern
13	DF	Lany Bäcker	6 March 2008 (aged 18)	(German Football Association) SGS Essen
18	DF	Mia-Lena Maas	15 March 2008 (aged 18)	(German Football Association) Freiburg
2	MF	Felicia Sträßer	16 December 2007 (aged 18)	(German Football Association) Carl Zeiss Jena
6	MF	Marie Gmeineder	26 February 2008 (aged 18)	(German Football Association) Bayern
7	MF	Zoe Schick	17 September 2008 (aged 17)	(German Football Association) Freiburg
8	MF	Tessa Zimmermann	30 October 2007 (aged 18)	(German Football Association) Eintracht
11	MF	Leni Eggert	6 July 2008 (aged 17)	(German Football Association) Hamburger
14	MF	Maria Penner	28 April 2007 (aged 19)	(German Football Association) Werder
15	MF	Maj Schneider	29 August 2007 (aged 18)	(German Football Association) Freiburg
16	MF	Paula Rintzner	6 April 2008 (aged 18)	(German Football Association) SGS Essen
19	MF	Laila Portella	7 May 2007 (aged 19)	(German Football Association) Bayern
20	MF	Emma Memminger	19 January 2007 (aged 19)	(German Football Association) Wolfsburg
9	FW	Leonie Köpp	13 April 2007 (aged 19)	(German Football Association) SGS Essen
10	FW	Elira Terakaj	20 March 2008 (aged 18)	(German Football Association) SGS Essen
17	FW	Helen Börner	28 January 2007 (aged 19)	(German Football Association) SGS Essen

=== Poland ===
The final squad was announced on 9 June 2026.

Head coach: Marcin Kasprowicz

No.	Pos.	Player	Date of birth (age)	Club
1	GK	Julia Woźniak	15 April 2007 (aged 19)	(Portuguese Football Federation) Sporting
12	GK	Hanna Wieczerzak	4 December 2007 (aged 18)	(Polish Football Association) Śląsk Wrocław
2	DF	Oliwia Łapińska	11 March 2008 (aged 18)	(Polish Football Association) Czarni Sosnowiec
4	DF	Magda Piekarska	14 December 2007 (aged 18)	(Italian Football Federation) Roma
5	DF	Emilia Sobierajska	3 August 2008 (aged 17)	(Polish Football Association) Czarni Sosnowiec
6	DF	Iga Witkowska	21 March 2008 (aged 18)	(Polish Football Association) Czarni Sosnowiec
13	DF	Zofia Pągowska	28 July 2007 (aged 18)	(Polish Football Association) UKS SMS Łódź
18	DF	Martyna Bartczak	25 June 2007 (aged 19)	(Polish Football Association) UKS SMS Łódź
3	MF	Julia Przybył	1 February 2008 (aged 18)	(Polish Football Association) Lech Poznań
7	MF	Krystyna Flis	2 August 2007 (aged 18)	(Swiss Football Association) Basel
8	MF	Zuzanna Witek	4 October 2007 (aged 18)	(Polish Football Association) Czarni Sosnowiec
9	MF	Małgorzata Rogus	18 August 2007 (aged 18)	(Polish Football Association) Lech Poznań
10	MF	Maja Zielińska	16 May 2007 (aged 19)	(German Football Association) Wolfsburg
15	MF	Weronika Araśniewicz	5 February 2008 (aged 18)	(German Football Association) Wolfsburg
16	MF	Kinga Klimczak	14 March 2007 (aged 19)	(Polish Football Association) AP Orlen Gdańsk
17	MF	Lena Świrska	10 June 2008 (aged 18)	(Polish Football Association) Pogoń Szczecin
11	FW	Oliwia Zgoda	7 November 2007 (aged 18)	(Polish Football Association) Rekord Bielsko-Biała
14	FW	Oliwia Związek	17 October 2007 (aged 18)	(Polish Football Association) Lech Poznań
19	FW	Kinga Wyrwas	16 May 2007 (aged 19)	(Polish Football Association) Śląsk Wrocław
20	FW	Anna Potrykus	24 August 2007 (aged 18)	(Polish Football Association) UKS SMS Łódź

=== Sweden ===
The final squad was announced on 12 June 2026.

Head coach: (Mexico) Briana Campos

No.	Pos.	Player	Date of birth (age)	Club
1	GK	Hanna Karlsson	3 November 2007 (aged 18)	(Swedish Football Association) Häcken
12	GK	Saga Andersson	25 July 2007 (aged 18)	(Swedish Football Association) Rosengård
2	DF	Thindra Mattsson	22 October 2007 (aged 18)	(Swedish Football Association) Uppsala
3	DF	Nicole Molin Kock	3 March 2007 (aged 19)	(Swedish Football Association) Hammarby
4	DF	Alice Broman	28 January 2007 (aged 19)	(Swedish Football Association) Växjö
5	DF	Paula Broddner Klingspor	15 April 2007 (aged 19)	(Swedish Football Association) Norrköping
13	DF	Tilde Karlsson	5 January 2007 (aged 19)	(Swedish Football Association) Häcken
14	DF	Thea Staffansson	12 September 2007 (aged 18)	(Swedish Football Association) Eskilsminne
22	DF	Olivia Okara	16 April 2007 (aged 19)	(Swedish Football Association) Örebro
6	MF	Nathalie Staaf	1 January 2007 (aged 19)	(Swedish Football Association) Häcken
7	MF	Inez Amcoff	16 February 2008 (aged 18)	(Swedish Football Association) Umeå
8	MF	Augusta Priks	18 June 2007 (aged 19)	(Swedish Football Association) Brommapojkarna
9	MF	Ella Lundin	21 August 2007 (aged 18)	(Swedish Football Association) Linköping
10	MF	Nova Selin	1 April 2008 (aged 18)	(Swedish Football Association) AIK
15	MF	Filippa Andersson Widén	23 March 2009 (aged 17)	(Swedish Football Association) Kristianstads
17	MF	Fabienne Bartholdson	5 November 2007 (aged 18)	(Swedish Football Association) Djurgårdens
20	MF	Fanny Peterson	23 October 2009 (aged 16)	(Swedish Football Association) Hammarby
23	MF	Astrid Forss	2 December 2008 (aged 17)	(Swedish Football Association) Umeå
11	FW	Filippa Sjöström	7 August 2008 (aged 17)	(Swedish Football Association) Rosengård
19	FW	Agnes Ekberg	2 August 2007 (aged 18)	(Swedish Football Association) Norrköping

== Group B ==
=== Austria ===
The final squad was announced on 17 June 2026.

Head coach: Markus Hackl

No.	Pos.	Player	Date of birth (age)	Club
1	GK	Sarah Trinkl	7 July 2007 (aged 18)	(Austrian Football Association) Bergheim
23	GK	Vivien Grabenhofer	18 May 2008 (aged 18)	(Austrian Football Association) Austria Wien
2	DF	Ronja Leidler	1 October 2008 (aged 17)	(Austrian Football Association) Rapid Wien
3	DF	Piia Willimek	23 September 2008 (aged 17)	(Austrian Football Association) Neulengbach
4	DF	Sophie Hoke	7 November 2007 (aged 18)	(Austrian Football Association) Altach/Vorderland
5	DF	Emira Makalic	6 February 2008 (aged 18)	(German Football Association) Union Berlin
15	DF	Anika Hofschweiger	5 May 2008 (aged 18)	(Austrian Football Association) Kleinmünchen/Blau-Weiß Linz
6	MF	Maja Keckeis	9 October 2007 (aged 18)	(Austrian Football Association) Altach/Vorderland
8	MF	Greta Spinn	21 March 2007 (aged 19)	(Austrian Football Association) Kleinmünchen/Blau-Weiß Linz
12	MF	Valentina Pötzl	13 December 2008 (aged 17)	(Austrian Football Association) Altach/Vorderland
13	MF	Katie Richter	4 May 2008 (aged 18)	(Austrian Football Association) Austria Wien
14	MF	Sara Grabovac	25 December 2008 (aged 17)	(Austrian Football Association) First Vienna
20	MF	Anna Osl	20 September 2008 (aged 17)	(German Football Association) Bayern München
7	FW	Tina Krassnig	5 March 2007 (aged 19)	(German Football Association) Köln
9	FW	Denise Lueger	31 July 2008 (aged 17)	(Austrian Football Association) Austria Wien
10	FW	Ella Herbst	27 September 2007 (aged 18)	(German Football Association) Wolfsburg
11	FW	Valentina Illinger	21 July 2007 (aged 18)	(Austrian Football Association) Neulengbach
16	FW	Emily Schäfer	19 May 2008 (aged 18)	(German Football Association) SGS Essen
17	FW	Alina Kerschbaumer	27 July 2008 (aged 17)	(Austrian Football Association) First Vienna
19	FW	Teresa Frizberg	28 January 2008 (aged 18)	(Austrian Football Association) Sturm Graz

=== Iceland ===
The final squad was announced on 11 June 2026.

Head coach: Halldór Sigurðsson

No.	Pos.	Player	Date of birth (age)	Club
1	GK	Herdís Guðbjartsdóttir	8 May 2007 (aged 19)	(Football Association of Iceland) Breiðablik
12	GK	Viktoría Óðinsdóttir	27 January 2007 (aged 19)	(Football Association of Iceland) Haukar
3	DF	Sóley Ingadóttir	26 February 2008 (aged 18)	(Football Association of Iceland) Valur
4	DF	Helga Einarsdóttir	5 February 2007 (aged 19)	(Football Association of Iceland) Breiðablik
5	DF	Jónína Linnet	5 May 2007 (aged 19)	(Football Association of Iceland) FH
13	DF	Anika Jónsdóttir	14 June 2009 (aged 17)	(Football Association of Iceland) Víkingur
17	DF	Védís Einarsdóttir	4 December 2008 (aged 17)	(Football Association of Iceland) FH
18	DF	Anna Óskarsdóttir	3 December 2009 (aged 16)	(Football Association of Iceland) FH
2	MF	Líf van Bemme	6 October 2007 (aged 18)	(Football Association of Iceland) Breiðablik
6	MF	Elísa Björnsdóttir	5 January 2008 (aged 18)	(Football Association of Iceland) Stjarnan
7	MF	Ingibjörg Magnúsdóttir	1 April 2009 (aged 17)	(Football Association of Iceland) FH
10	MF	Ragnheiður Jónsdóttir	29 November 2007 (aged 18)	(Football Association of Iceland) HK
14	MF	Hrafnhildur Pálmadóttir	21 August 2008 (aged 17)	(Football Association of Iceland) Víkingur
15	MF	Sunna Sigurðardóttir	18 June 2008 (aged 18)	(Football Association of Iceland) Breiðablik
19	MF	Rebekka Brynjarsdóttir	27 April 2009 (aged 17)	(Danish Football Association) Aars
20	MF	Arnfríður Arnarsdóttir	2 April 2008 (aged 18)	(Football Association of Iceland) Keflavík
8	FW	Edith Kristjánsdóttir	17 July 2008 (aged 17)	(Football Association of Iceland) Breiðablik
9	FW	Berglind Hlynsdóttir	5 January 2007 (aged 19)	(Football Association of Iceland) FH
11	FW	Freyja Stefánsdóttir	22 December 2007 (aged 18)	(Football Association of Iceland) Valur
16	FW	Fanney Jóhannsdóttir	18 March 2009 (aged 17)	(Football Association of Iceland) Stjarnan

=== Spain ===
The final squad was announced on 19 June 2026.

Head coach: David Aznar

No.	Pos.	Player	Date of birth (age)	Club
1	GK	Laia López	29 January 2007 (aged 19)	(Royal Spanish Football Federation) Real Madrid
13	GK	Anna Álvarez	17 January 2008 (aged 18)	(Royal Spanish Football Federation) Levante
2	DF	Martina González	9 December 2007 (aged 18)	(Royal Spanish Football Federation) Barcelona
3	DF	Julia Torres	15 January 2009 (aged 17)	(Royal Spanish Football Federation) Sevilla
4	DF	Silvia Cristóbal	1 May 2008 (aged 18)	(Royal Spanish Football Federation) Real Madrid
5	DF	Amaya García	10 June 2007 (aged 19)	(Royal Spanish Football Federation) Real Madrid
15	DF	Nerea Carmona	19 January 2007 (aged 19)	(Royal Spanish Football Federation) Ona Sant Adrià
17	DF	Emma Moreno	2 May 2007 (aged 19)	(Royal Spanish Football Federation) Eibar
6	MF	Irune Dorado	22 March 2007 (aged 19)	(Royal Spanish Football Federation) Real Madrid
7	MF	Adriana Folgado	1 April 2007 (aged 19)	(Royal Spanish Football Federation) Real Madrid
8	MF	Elene Gurtubay	3 October 2007 (aged 18)	(Royal Spanish Football Federation) Athletic
10	MF	Ainoa Gómez	13 April 2007 (aged 19)	(Royal Spanish Football Federation) Barcelona
16	MF	Paula Redruello	27 January 2007 (aged 19)	(Royal Spanish Football Federation) Deportivo
22	MF	Rosalía Domínguez	11 October 2008 (aged 17)	(Royal Spanish Football Federation) Barcelona
9	FW	Celia Segura	10 March 2007 (aged 19)	(Royal Spanish Football Federation) Barcelona
11	FW	Iris Santiago	9 November 2007 (aged 18)	(Royal Spanish Football Federation) Real Madrid
14	FW	Lúa Arufe	6 September 2008 (aged 17)	(Royal Spanish Football Federation) Barcelona
19	FW	Alba Cerrato	1 January 2007 (aged 19)	(Royal Spanish Football Federation) Sevilla
20	FW	Natalia Escot	8 February 2007 (aged 19)	(Royal Spanish Football Federation) Barcelona
21	FW	Lucía Rivas	23 August 2007 (aged 18)	(Royal Spanish Football Federation) Deportivo

=== Switzerland ===
The final squad was announced on 17 June 2026.

Head coach: Veronica Maglia

No.	Pos.	Player	Date of birth (age)	Club
1	GK	Yara Zwyssig	9 July 2008 (aged 17)	(Swiss Football Association) Frauenfussball
12	GK	Leyla Laubscher	1 July 2008 (aged 17)	(Swiss Football Association) Servette
2	DF	Chiara Wallin	18 June 2007 (aged 19)	(Swiss Football Association) Servette
3	DF	Emilia Brunner	26 January 2008 (aged 18)	(Swiss Football Association) Frauenfussball
4	DF	Emma Egli	21 July 2007 (aged 18)	(Swiss Football Association) Frauenfussball
5	DF	Johanna Thüer	16 April 2008 (aged 18)	(Swiss Football Association) St. Gallen
14	DF	Andrea Jäggi	10 April 2007 (aged 19)	(Swiss Football Association) Aarau
16	DF	Anika Seliner	12 June 2007 (aged 19)	(Swiss Football Association) St. Gallen
6	MF	Andrea Schenk	8 February 2007 (aged 19)	(Swiss Football Association) Young Boys
8	MF	Giulia Looser	18 February 2008 (aged 18)	(Swiss Football Association) Frauenfussball
10	MF	Giorgia Bianchi	18 June 2008 (aged 18)	(Italian Football Federation) Juventus
11	MF	Ramona Schallberger	12 December 2009 (aged 16)	(Swiss Football Association) Luzern
13	MF	Lia Ammann	10 September 2007 (aged 18)	(Swiss Football Association) St. Gallen
15	MF	Laura Kott	24 April 2008 (aged 18)	(Swiss Football Association) Rapperswil-Jona
18	MF	Melissa Rondalli	23 November 2007 (aged 18)	(Swiss Football Association) Luzern
20	MF	Olivia Edelmann	20 May 2008 (aged 18)	(Swiss Football Association) St. Gallen
7	FW	Emilie Mece	15 July 2007 (aged 18)	(French Football Federation) Lyon
9	FW	Emanuela Pfister	12 April 2007 (aged 19)	(Swiss Football Association) Frauenfussball
17	FW	Rahel Hinder	29 November 2007 (aged 18)	(Swiss Football Association) Zürich
19	FW	Tiffany Vonnez	26 December 2008 (aged 17)	(Swiss Football Association) Young Boys
