= 2026 UEFA Women's Under-19 Championship =

UEFA Europsko prvenstvo za žene do 19 godina 2026

Tournament details
- Host country: Bosnia and Herzegovina
- Cities: Sarajevo; Zenica
- Dates: 27 June – 10 July
- Teams: 8 (from 1 confederation)
- Venues: 4 (in 2 host cities)

Final positions
- Champions: Spain (8th title)
- Runners-up: Germany

Tournament statistics
- Matches played: 15
- Goals scored: 51 (3.4 per match)
- Top scorer(s): (Spain) Alba Cerrato (Spain) Ainoa Gómez (Spain) Rosalía Domínguez (Switzerland) Emanuela Pfister (3 goals each)
- Best player: (Spain) Rosalía Domínguez

The 2026 UEFA Women's Under-19 Championship was the 23rd edition of the UEFA Women's Under-19 Championship, the annual international youth football championship organised by UEFA for the women's under-19 national teams of Europe. Bosnia and Herzegovina hosted the tournament from 27 June to 10 July 2026.

A total of eight teams played in the tournament, with players born on or after 1 January 2007 eligible to participate.

== Qualification ==
52 (out of 55) UEFA countries entered the qualifying competition, with the host team Bosnia and Herzegovina also participating, although they qualified automatically. Seven teams qualified for the final tournament at the end of round 2 to join the hosts.

== Qualified teams ==
Seven teams qualified for the final tournament along with hosts Bosnia and Herzegovina.

Note: All appearance statistics include only U-19 era (since 2002).

Team	Qualification method	Date of qualification	Appearance(s)				Previous best performance (Note: Bold text indicates they hosted that edition.)
Team	Qualification method	Date of qualification	Total	First	Last	Streak	Previous best performance
Bosnia and Herzegovina	Host nation	26 September 2023	1st	Debut			
Switzerland	Round 2 Group A1 winners	15 April 2026	9th	2002	2018	1	Semi-Finals (2009, 2011, 2016)
Poland	Round 2 Group A2 winners	18 April 2026	3rd	2007	2025	2	Group Stage (2007, 2025)
Iceland	Round 2 Group A3 winners	15 April 2026	4th	2007	2023	1	Group Stage (2007, 2009, 2023)
Austria	Round 2 Group A4 winners	16 April 2026	3rd	2016	2023	1	Fifth place (2023)
Sweden	Round 2 Group A5 winners	17 April 2026	12th	2002	2025	2	Champions (2012, 2015)
Germany	Round 2 Group A6 winners	16 April 2026	20th	2002	2024	1	Champions (2002, 2006, 2007, 2011)
Spain	Round 2 Group A7 winners	18 April 2026	19th	2002	2025	11	Champions (2004, 2017, 2018, 2022, 2023, 2024, 2025)

== Group stage ==
The group winners and runners-up advanced to the semi-finals.

Tie-breaking criteria for group play
The ranking of teams in the group stage was determined as follows:
1. Points obtained in all group matches;
2. Points in head-to-head matches among tied teams;
3. Goal difference in head-to-head matches among tied teams;
4. Goals scored in head-to-head matches among tied teams;
5. If more than two teams were tied, and after applying all head-to-head criteria above, a subset of teams were still tied, all head-to-head criteria above were reapplied exclusively to this subset of teams;
6. Goal difference in all group matches;
7. Goals scored in all group matches;
8. Penalty shoot-out if only two teams had the same number of points, and they met in the last round of the group and were tied after applying all criteria above (not used if more than two teams had the same number of points, or if their rankings were not relevant for qualification for the next stage);
9. Disciplinary points
  - Yellow card: −1 point;
  - Indirect red card (second yellow card): −3 points;
  - Direct red card: −3 points;
10. UEFA coefficient for the qualifying round draw;
11. Drawing of lots.

=== Group A ===
Pos	Team	Pld	W	D	L	GF	GA	GD	Pts	Qualification
1	Germany	3	2	1	0	8	1	+7	7	Knockout stage
2	Sweden	3	2	0	1	6	2	+4	6	Knockout stage
3	Poland	3	1	1	1	6	3	+3	4	
4	Bosnia and Herzegovina (H)	3	0	0	3	1	15	−14	0	

Source: UEFA
Rules for classification: Group stage tiebreakers
(H) Hosts
27 June 2026
17:00

Bosnia and Herzegovina	0–5	Germany
	Report	Rintzner 36'; Sträßer 49', 57'; Memminger 71'; Bäcker 90+5'

Bosnia and Herzegovina FA Training Centre, Zenica
Attendance: 706
Referee: Michaela Pachtová (Czech Republic)
27 June 2026
20:00

Sweden	1–0	Poland
Witkowska 83' (o.g.)	Report

Stadion Grbavica, Sarajevo
Attendance: 118
Referee: Deborah Bianchi (Italy)

30 June 2026
17:00

Bosnia and Herzegovina	0–5	Sweden
	Report	Bartholdson 17'; Andersson Widén 31', 45+3'; Golubović 80' (o.g.); Ekberg 83'

Bilino Polje Stadium, Zenica
Referee: Emily Heaslip (England)
30 June 2026
20:00

Poland	1–1	Germany
Związek 33'	Report	Zimmermann 57'

Koševo City Stadium, Sarajevo
Referee: Miriama Bocková (Slovakia)

3 July 2026
17:00

Poland	5–1	Bosnia and Herzegovina
Araśniewicz 9', 44'; Świrska 21', 73'; Witek 82'	Report	Mirković 70'

Stadion Grbavica, Sarajevo
Referee: Tatyana Sorokopudova (Kazakhstan)
3 July 2026
17:00

Germany	2–0	Sweden
Portella 12' (pen.); Schneider 64'	Report

Bosnia and Herzegovina FA Training Centre, Zenica
Referee: Alexandra Collin (France)

=== Group B ===
Pos	Team	Pld	W	D	L	GF	GA	GD	Pts	Qualification
1	Spain	3	2	1	0	8	3	+5	7	Knockout stage
2	Austria	3	2	0	1	7	3	+4	6	Knockout stage
3	Switzerland	3	1	1	1	7	8	−1	4	
4	Iceland	3	0	0	3	3	11	−8	0	

Source: UEFA
Rules for classification: Group stage tiebreakers
28 June 2026
14:00

Switzerland	2–2	Spain
Mece 34'; Pfister 87' (pen.)	Report	Ainoa 36', 63'

Koševo City Stadium, Sarajevo
Attendance: 114
Referee: Emily Heaslip (England)
28 June 2026
17:00

Austria	3–0	Iceland
Lueger 28'; Leidler 45+2'; Krassnig 90+3'	Report

Bilino Polje Stadium, Zenica
Attendance: 92
Referee: Tatyana Sorokopudova (Kazakhstan)

1 July 2026
14:00

Austria	3–1	Switzerland
Richter 41'; Illinger 59'; Spinn 90+2'	Report	Hinder 69'

Stadion Grbavica, Sarajevo
Referee: Alexandra Collin (France)
1 July 2026
17:00

Spain	4–0	Iceland
Segura 19'; Rosalía 23', 30'; Cerrato 43'	Report

Bosnia and Herzegovina FA Training Centre, Zenica
Referee: Deborah Bianchi (Italy)

4 July 2026
17:00

Spain	2–1	Austria
Cerrato 20' (pen.); Gurtubay 43'	Report	Makalic 45'

Bilino Polje Stadium, Zenica
Referee: Miriama Bočková (Slovakia)
4 July 2026
17:00

Iceland	3–4	Switzerland
Magnúsdóttir 26', 70'; Van Bemmel 83'	Report	Schallberger 16'; Pfister 28', 63' (pen.); Rondalli 45+2'

Koševo City Stadium, Sarajevo
Referee: Michaela Pachtová (Czech Republic)

== Knockout stage ==
In the knockout stage, extra time and a penalty shoot-out were used to decide the winners if necessary.

=== Bracket ===
Semi-finals
7 July
Germany (a.e.t.)	1
Austria	0
7 July
Spain	3
Sweden	0

Final
10 July
Germany	0
Spain	1

=== Semi-finals ===
7 July 2026
16:00

Spain	3–0	Sweden
Cerrato 3'; Domínguez 60'; Gómez 64'	Report

Bosnia and Herzegovina FA Training Centre, Zenica
Referee: Alexandra Collin (France)
7 July 2026
20:00

Germany	1–0 (a.e.t.)	Austria
Zimmermann 109'	Report

Stadion Grbavica, Sarajevo
Referee: Emily Heaslip (England)

=== Final ===
10 July 2026
18:00

Germany	0–1	Spain
	Report	Dorado 60'

Stadion Grbavica, Sarajevo
Referee: Miriama Bocková (Slovakia)

== Goalscorers ==
There were 51 goals scored in 15 matches, for an average of 3.4 goals per match.

3 goals

- (Spain) Alba Cerrato
- (Spain) Ainoa Gómez
- (Spain) Rosalía Domínguez
- (Switzerland) Emanuela Pfister

2 goals

- (Germany) Felicia Sträßer
- (Germany) Tessa Zimmermann
- (Iceland) Ingibjörg Magnúsdóttir
- (Poland) Lena Świrska
- (Poland) Weronika Araśniewicz
- (Sweden) Filippa Andersson Widén

1 goal

- (Austria) Valentina Illinger
- (Austria) Tina Krassnig
- (Austria) Ronja Leidler
- (Austria) Denise Lueger
- (Austria) Emira Makalic
- (Austria) Katie Richter
- (Austria) Greta Spinn
- (Bosnia and Herzegovina) Natalija Mirković
- (Germany) Lany Bäcker
- (Germany) Emma Memminger
- (Germany) Laila Portella
- (Germany) Paula Rintzner
- (Germany) Maj Schneider
- (Iceland) Líf Van Bemmel
- (Poland) Oliwia Związek
- (Poland) Zuzanna Witek
- (Spain) Irune Dorado
- (Spain) Elene Gurtubay
- (Spain) Celia Segura
- (Sweden) Fabienne Bartholdson
- (Sweden) Agnes Ekberg
- (Switzerland) Rahel Hinder
- (Switzerland) Emilie Mece
- (Switzerland) Melissa Rondalli
- (Switzerland) Ramona Schallberger

1 own goal

- (Bosnia and Herzegovina) Nadija Golubović (against Sweden)
- (Poland) Iga Witkowska (against Sweden)

== Awards ==
The following awards were given after the tournament:

- Player of the Tournament: (Spain) Rosalía Domínguez
- Top Scorer: (Spain) Alba Cerrato, (Spain) Ainoa Gómez, (Spain) Rosalía Domínguez, (Switzerland) Emanuela Pfister (3 goals)

=== Team of the Tournament ===
After the tournament, the Under-19 Team of the Tournament was selected by the UEFA Technical Observer panel.

Position	Player
Goalkeeper	(Germany) Janne Krumme
Defenders	(Germany) Lenelotte Müller
Defenders	(Spain) Amaya García
Defenders	(Sweden) Paula Klingspor
Midfielders	(Spain) Emma Moreno
Midfielders	(Spain) Ainoa Gómez
Midfielders	(Spain) Irune Dorado
Midfielders	(Germany) Emma Memminger
Forwards	(Austria) Valentina Pötzl
Forwards	(Spain) Alba Cerrato
Forwards	(Spain) Rosalía Domínguez
