= Elene Gurtubay =

Spanish footballer (born 2007)

Personal information
- Full name: Elene Gurtubay Loyo
- Date of birth: 3 October 2007 (age 19)
- Place of birth: Bilbao, Spain
- Position: Midfielder

Team information
- Current team: Athletic Bilbao
- Number: 33

Youth career
- 2019–2021: San Inazio
- 2021–2022: Bizkerre

Senior career*
Years	Team	Apps	(Gls)
2022–2023	Bizkerre B		
2023–2024	Bizkerre	13	(3)
2024–	Athletic Bilbao B	34	(7)
2025–	Athletic Bilbao	18	(1)

International career^{‡}
2024–	Spain U19	21	(1)
Medal record
Women's football
Representing Spain
FIFA U-20 Women's World Cup
Winner	2026 Poland
UEFA Women's Under-19 Championship
Winner	2025 Poland
Winner	2026 Bosnia-Herzegovina
- * Club domestic league appearances and goals as of 25 August 2026 ‡ National team caps and goals as of 25 August 2026

Elene Gurtubay Loyo (born 3 October 2007) is a Spanish professional footballer who plays as a midfielder for Liga F club Athletic Bilbao.

== Club career ==
Born in Bilbao (Biscay, Basque Country) and raised in the Deusto district of the city, Gurtubay began her football career at local amateur clubs San Inazio and Bizkerre, where she played at senior level in the regionalised third tier (Segunda Federación) aged 15. She joined Athletic Bilbao in 2024, initially playing for the B-team who were in the same division as Bizkerre.

Having started the 2025–26 season with the reserves (who went on to win their group to gain promotion to the Primera Federación), she made her debut for Athletic's senior team in December 2025, starting in a 1–0 victory over Levante at Lezama. A week later she scored her first goal in Liga F in a 2–0 away win against Madrid CFF and remained with the main squad from then on, making 21 appearances in all competitions. In July 2026 she signed a new contract with the club running to 2029, and at the start of 2026–27 she still had her B-team squad number but was expected to continue playing for the A-team.

== International career ==
=== Spain U19 ===
Gurtubay did not feature at a major tournament for Spain at under-17 level, but was part of the squad at the 2025 UEFA Women's Under-19 Championship in Poland where they finished as champions. She was still young enough to compete at the subsequent 2026 UEFA Women's Under-19 Championship in Bosnia-Herzegovina, where she had a more prominent role and scored against Austria as Spain retained their title.

== Personal life ==
She began a degree in Telecommunications Engineering at university in 2025.

== Honours ==
Spain U19

- UEFA Women's Under-19 Championship: 2025, 2026

Spain U20

- FIFA U-20 Women's World Cup: 2026
