= Irune Dorado =

Spanish footballer (born 2008)

Personal information
- Full name: Irune Dorado Alosete
- Date of birth: 22 March 2008 (age 18)
- Place of birth: Pozuelo de Alarcón, Spain
- Position: Midfielder

Team information
- Current team: Real Madrid
- Number: 15

Youth career
- 2014–2017: A.C.D Fátima
- 2017-2021: Atlético Madrid
- 2021-2024: Real Madrid

Senior career*
Years	Team	Apps	(Gls)
2023–2026	Real Madrid B	18	(0)
2025–	Real Madrid	27	(0)

International career^{‡}
2024–2025	Spain U17	21	(1)
2024–	Spain U19	21	(3)
2026–	Spain U20	10	(2)
Medal record
Women's football
Representing Spain
FIFA U-20 Women's World Cup
Winner	2026 Poland
UEFA Women's Under-19 Championship
Winner	2025 Poland
Winner	2026 Bosnia and Herzegovina
FIFA U-17 Women's World Cup
Runner-up	2024 Dominican Republic
UEFA Women's Under-17 Championship
Winner	2024 Sweden
- * Club domestic league appearances and goals as of 02:42, 11 July 2026 (UTC) ‡ National team caps and goals as of 00:32, 28 September 2026 (UTC)

Irune Dorado Alosete (born 22 March 2008) is a Spanish professional footballer who plays as a midfielder for Liga F club Real Madrid.

== Club career ==
=== Youth career ===
Dorado joined Real Madrid in 2021 when she was still a 'cadete'. Before that, she had played 4 years in the Atlético Madrid academy.

=== Real Madrid B ===
Dorado climbed through the ranks until reaching Real Madrid's B team, where she made her debut in 2023.

On 26 July 2025, Dorado extended her contract with Real Madrid 'B' until June 2026.

=== Real Madrid ===
Dorado made her first team debut on 31 January 2025 in a league game against Espanyol; by doing so, she became the youngest player to debut for Real Madrid in Liga F at 16 years and 315 days. She got her first start on 15 March 2025 in a 2-2 draw against Deportivo. Days later, on March 18 2025, Dorado played her first UEFA Women's Champions League match in a 2-0 win against Arsenal; she came on as a substitute for Melanie Leupolz in the 62nd minute.

On 26 August 2026, Dorado was officially promoted to the first team, signing a new contract until 2029.

== International career ==
Dorado has played in the U-17, U-19, and U-20 levels of the Spain women's national football team.

In 2024, she was part of the Spain U-17 squad that won the 2024 UEFA Women's Under-17 Championship in Sweden by defeating England 4-0 in the final. By winning the tournament, Spain qualified for the 2024 FIFA U-17 Women's World Cup, where Dorado was one of the key players for Spain, even being named MVP of the final despite losing on penalties to North Korea.

Dorado was selected Spain U-19 squad that won the 2025 UEFA Women's Under-19 Championship, despite being only 17 at the time. In the semi-finals, she scored Spain's first goal in a 2-0 extra-time win over Italy. For her importance in Spain's victory, she was selected in the Team of the Tournament.

In 2026, she was selected as captain for the 2026 UEFA Women's Under-19 Championship, where she scored the winning goal for Spain in the final. For her importance controling the rhythm of the game and leading by example throughout the competition, she was once again included in the Team of the Tournament. Later that year, Dorardo was part of the Spain U-20 squad that won the 2026 FIFA U-20 Women's World Cup.

== Career statistics ==
As of 10 July 2026

Appearances and goals by club, season and competition
Club	Season	League			Copa de la Reina		Continental		Other		Total	
Club	Season	Division	Apps	Goals	Apps	Goals	Apps	Goals	Apps	Goals	Apps	Goals
Real Madrid B	2023–24	Segunda Federación	1	0	—		—		—		1	0
Real Madrid B	2024–25	Primera Federación	17	0	—		—		—		17	0
Real Madrid B	2025–26	Primera Federación	5	0	—		—		—		5	0
Real Madrid B	Total		23	0	—		—		—		23	0
Real Madrid	2024–25	Liga F	7	0	2	0	1 (Note: Appearance(s) in UEFA Women's Champions League)	0	0	0	10	0
Real Madrid	2025–26	Liga F	20	0	2	0	3	0	1 (Note: Appearance in Supercopa de España)	0	26	0
Real Madrid	Total		27	0	4	0	4	0	1	0	36	0
Career total			50	0	4	0	4	0	1	0	59	0

== Honours ==
Real Madrid Juvenil

- Torneo Juvenil Femenino: 2024, 2025

Real Madrid B

- Segunda Federación: 2023–24

Real Madrid

- Liga F runner-up: 2025

Spain U17

- UEFA Women's Under-17 Championship: 2024
- FIFA U-17 Women's World Cup runner-up: 2024

Spain U19

- UEFA Women's Under-19 Championship: 2025, 2026

Spain U20

- FIFA U-20 Women's World Cup: 2026

Individual

- UEFA Women's Under-19 Championship Team of the Tournament: 2025, 2026
