= Alba Cerrato =

Spanish footballer (born 2007)

- Cerrato in 2024

Personal information
- Full name: Alba Cerrato Iquierdo
- Date of birth: 1 January 2007 (age 19)
- Place of birth: Córdoba, Spain
- Height: 1.65 m (5 ft 5 in)
- Position: Forward

Team information
- Current team: Fiorentina

Youth career
- 2018–2020: Séneca
- 2021–2023: Sevilla

Senior career*
Years	Team	Apps	(Gls)
2023–2025	Sevilla B		
2023–2026	Sevilla	56	(3)
2026–	Fiorentina	0	(0)

International career^{‡}
2023–2024	Spain U17	27	(27)
2024–	Spain U19	10	(4)
Medal record
Women's football
Representing Spain
FIFA U-20 Women's World Cup
Winner	2026 Poland
UEFA Women's Under-19 Championship
Winner	2025 Poland
Winner	2026 Bosnia and Herzegovina
UEFA Women's Under-17 Championship
Winner	2024 Sweden
FIFA U-17 Women's World Cup
Runner-up	2024 Dominican Republic
- * Club domestic league appearances and goals as of 23:22, 9 July 2026 (UTC) ‡ National team caps and goals as of 6 November 2024

Alba Cerrato Izquierdo (born 1 January 2007) is a Spanish professional footballer who plays as a forward for Serie A Women club Fiorentina.

== Club career ==
=== Séneca CF ===
In 2018, Cerrato joined Séneca CF Alevín at the age of 12. She then moved up to the Séneca CF B Infantil and Séneca CF Infantil teams.

=== Sevilla FC ===
Cerrato arrived at Sevilla FC Femenino Cadete being praised as an "impenetrable right-back", as she had spent her early development career playing in defense.

She was fully promoted to the senior team of Sevilla FC Femenino for the 2025–26 season.

=== Fiorentina ===
On 4 August 2026, Cerrato joined Serie A Women club Fiorentina, signing a contract until 2030.

== International career ==
Cerrato debuted the Spanish under-17 national team and won the 2024 UEFA Women's Under-17 Championship, being the tournament's best player and top scorer.

Cerrato participated in the 2024 FIFA U-17 Women's World Cup where Spain finished as runners-up.

Cerrato was called up in 2024 for the Spain under-19 team in San Pedro del Pinatar.

She won the 2025 UEFA Women's Under-19 Championship with Spain U19.

== Personal life ==
Cerrato completed her first year of Bachillerato and wants to study physiotherapy.

== Honours ==
Spain U17

- UEFA Women's Under-17 Championship: 2024
- FIFA U-17 Women's World Cup runner-up: 2024

Spain U19

- UEFA Women's Under-19 Championship: 2025, 2026

Spain U20

- FIFA U-20 Women's World Cup: 2026

Individual

- UEFA Women's Under-17 Championship top scorer: 2024
- UEFA Women's Under-17 Championship Player of the Tournament: 2024
- UEFA Women's Under-19 Championship top scorer: 2026
- UEFA Women's Under-19 Championship Team of the Tournament: 2026
