= Ainoa Gómez =

Spanish footballer (born 2007)

Personal information
- Full name: Ainoa Gómez Luna
- Date of birth: 13 April 2007 (age 19)
- Place of birth: Cerdanyola del Vallès, Spain
- Height: 1.63 m (5 ft 4 in)
- Position: Attacking midfielder

Team information
- Current team: Deportivo de A Coruña
- Number: 21

Senior career*
Years	Team	Apps	(Gls)
2024–2026	Barcelona B		
2025–	Barcelona	3	(1)
2026–	→ Deportivo de A Coruña (loan)	1	(0)

International career
2023–2024	Spain U17	22	(11)
2024–	Spain U19	19	(9)
2026–	Spain U20	9	(0)
Medal record
Women's football
Representing Spain
FIFA U-20 Women's World Cup
Winner	2026 Poland
UEFA Women's Under-19 Championship
Winner	2025 Poland
Winner	2026 Bosnia and Herzegovina
UEFA Women's Under-17 Championship
Winner	2024 Sweden
FIFA U-17 Women's World Cup
Runner-up	2024 Dominican Republic
- * Club domestic league appearances and goals as of 23:20, 9 July 2026 (UTC)

Ainoa Gómez Luna (born 13 April 2007) is a Spanish professional footballer who plays as an attacking midfielder for Liga F club Deportivo de A Coruña, on loan from Barcelona.

== Club career ==
Gómez trained with the youth teams of her hometown club, Cerdanyola del Vallès, before joining Espanyol's youth academy. In 2022, she was signed by Barcelona, joining their youth teams.

During the 2025–26 season, Gómez played with Barcelona B, where she played in 22 matches and scored three goals, contributing to their league title. In the same season, she made her first steps with the first team of Barcelona, debuting in the UEFA Women's Champions League on 10 December 2025 against Benfica, and in Liga F three days later. On 10 January 2026, she scored her first goal with the first team in a 12–1 victory against Madrid CFF.

On 16 July 2026, Gómez was loaned to Deportivo de A Coruña.

== International career ==
Gómez was part of the Spain under-17 squad that won the 2024 UEFA Women's Under-17 Championship and finished runners-up in the FIFA U-17 Women's World Cup.

Gómez was part of the Spain under-19 squad that won the 2025 UEFA Women's Under-17 Championship.

In June 2026, Gómez was named to the Spain under-19 squad for the UEFA Women's Under-19 Championship, which they won. As one the joint-top scorers of the tournament, she scored three goals was named to the team of the Tournament. Gómez was included in the Spain squad that won the 2026 FIFA U-20 Women's World Cup.

== Honours ==
Barcelona

- Liga F: 2025–26
- Copa de la Reina: 2025–26
- Supercopa de España: 2025–26

Barcelona B

- Primera Federación: 2025–26

Spain U17

- UEFA Women's Under-17 Championship: 2024
- FIFA U-17 Women's World Cup runner-up: 2024

Spain U19

- UEFA Women's Under-19 Championship: 2025, 2026

Spain U20

- FIFA U-20 Women's World Cup: 2026

Individual

- UEFA Women's Under-17 Championship Team of the Tournament: 2024
- UEFA Women's Under-19 Championship top scorer: 2026
- UEFA Women's Under-19 Championship Team of the Tournament: 2026
