= Rosalía Domínguez =

Spanish footballer (born 2008)

Personal information
- Full name: Rosalía Domínguez Navarro
- Date of birth: 11 October 2008 (age 18)
- Place of birth: Camas, Spain
- Height: 1.63 m (5 ft 4 in)
- Position: Attacking midfielder

Team information
- Current team: Barcelona B
- Number: 31

Senior career*
Years	Team	Apps	(Gls)
2024	Sevilla		
2024–	Barcelona B		
2025–	Barcelona	1	(0)

International career
2023	Spain U16		
2024–2025	Spain U17	15	(12)
2025–	Spain U19	9	(5)
2025–	Spain U20		
Medal record
Women's football
Representing Spain
FIFA U-20 Women's World Cup
Winner	2026 Poland
UEFA Women's Under-19 Championship
Winner	2026 Bosnia and Herzegovina
- * Club domestic league appearances and goals as of 23:20, 9 July 2026 (UTC)

Rosalía Domínguez Navarro (born 11 October 2008) is a Spanish professional footballer who plays as an attacking midfielder for Primera Federación club Barcelona B.

== Club career ==
Domínguez began her career at Camas, in her hometown. She later signed for Sevilla. In the 2024–25 season, Domínguez was signed by FC Barcelona Femení to play for Barça C although with dynamics with the reserve team. In the 2025–26 season, she was already a player for Barça B. She made her debut with the first team in the final of the Copa Catalunya on 16 August 2025. On the twenty-sixth day of the league she played her first match as a Blaugrana with the first team in the Liga F. In April 2026, she renewed her contract with the Blaugrana team until 2029.

== International career ==
In 2023, Domínguez played with the Spain under-16 squad.

Domínguez was part of the Spain under-17 squad that played in the 2025 UEFA Women's Under-17 Championship. She was also part of the same squad that competed in that year's FIFA U-17 Women's World Cup.

In June 2026, Domínguez was named to the Spain under-19 squad for the UEFA Women's Under-19 Championship, which they won. As one of the joint-top scorers of the tournament, she scored three goals, provided four assists and was named Player of the Tournament. Domínguez was included in the Spain squad that won the 2026 FIFA U-20 Women's World Cup. She was awarded the Golden Ball of the tournament.

== Honours ==
Barcelona

- Liga F: 2025–26
- Copa Catalunya: 2024–25

Barcelona B

- Primera Federación: 2025–26

Spain U19

- UEFA Women's Under-19 Championship: 2026

Spain U20

- FIFA U-20 Women's World Cup: 2026

Individual

- UEFA Women's Under-19 Championship top scorer: 2026
- UEFA Women's Under-19 Championship Player of the Tournament: 2026
- UEFA Women's Under-19 Championship Team of the Tournament: 2026
- FIFA U-20 Women's World Cup Golden Ball: 2026
