= UEFA Women's Under-19 Championship =

- Organiser(s): UEFA
- Founded: 1997
- Region: Europe
- Teams: 8 (finals); Maximum of 55 (qualifiers)
- Related competitions: UEFA Women's Under-17 Championship
- Current champions: Spain (8th title)
- Most championships: Spain (8 titles)
- Website: uefa.com/womensunder19
- 2026 UEFA Women's Under-19 Championship

The UEFA European Women's Under-19 Championship or simply UEFA Women's Under-19 Championship, is an annual competition in women's football for European national teams of players under 19 years of age. National under-19 teams whose countries belong to the European governing body UEFA can register to enter the competition.

In odd years the tournament is also a FIFA U-20 Women's World Cup qualifying competition. The tournament began in the 1997–98 season as an under-18 event and became an under-19s event from the 2001–02 season. The Championship has three phases: two qualifying rounds open to all eligible nations and the finals phase which is composed of 8 qualified teams. The finals themselves are composed of two groups of four teams; each team plays the others in the group. The winner of each group after the 3 matches plays the runner-up of the opposing group in a semi-final, with the winner contesting the final.

== Finals format ==
Since 2002 the finals had eight teams with two groups of four teams, semi-finals and the final.

== Results ==
Edition	Year	Host	Final			Third place match		
Edition	Year	Host	Champions	Score	Runner-up	Third place	Score	Fourth place
1	1998	Two-legged final	Denmark	2–0; 2–3 (4–3 agg.)	France	Germany and Sweden		
2	1999	Sweden	Sweden	Round-robin	Germany	Italy	Round-robin	Norway
3	2000	France	Germany	4–2	Spain	Sweden	Round-robin	France
4	2001	Norway	Germany	3–2	Norway	Denmark	1–0	Spain
5	2002	Sweden	Germany	3–1	France	Denmark and England		
6	2003	Germany	France	2–0	Norway	England and Sweden		
7	2004	Finland	Spain	2–1	Germany	Italy and Russia		
8	2005	Hungary	Russia	2–2; 6–5 (pen.)	France	Finland and Germany		
9	2006	Switzerland	Germany	3–0	France	Denmark and Russia		
10	2007	Iceland	Germany	2–0 (a.e.t.)	England	France and Norway		
11	2008	France	Italy	1–0	Norway	Germany and Sweden		
12	2009	Belarus	England	2–0	Sweden	France and Switzerland		
13	2010	Macedonia	France	2–1	England	Germany and Netherlands		
14	2011	Italy	Germany	8–1	Norway	Italy and Switzerland		
15	2012	Turkey	Sweden	1–0 (a.e.t.)	Spain	Denmark and Portugal		
16	2013	Wales	France	2–0 (a.e.t.)	England	Finland and Germany		
17	2014	Norway	Netherlands	1–0	Spain	Norway and Republic of Ireland		
18	2015	Israel	Sweden	3–1	Spain	France and Germany		
19	2016	Slovakia	France	2–1	Spain	Netherlands and Switzerland		
20	2017	Northern Ireland	Spain	3–2	France	Germany and Netherlands		
21	2018	Switzerland	Spain	1–0	Germany	Denmark and Norway		
22	2019	Scotland	France	2–1	Germany	Netherlands and Spain		
-	2020	Georgia	Cancelled due to COVID-19 pandemic					
-	2021	Belarus	Cancelled due to COVID-19 pandemic					
23	2022	Czech Republic	Spain	2–1	Norway	France and Sweden		
24	2023	Belgium	Spain	0–0; 3–2 (pen.)	Germany	France and Netherlands		
25	2024	Lithuania	Spain	2–1 (a.e.t.)	Netherlands	England and France		
26	2025	Poland (Note: Belarus were originally appointed as hosts of the 2025 tournament, but were stripped of their hosting rights on 4 April 2023 due to their country's involvement in the Russian invasion of Ukraine.)	Spain	4–0	France	Italy and Portugal		
27	2026	Bosnia and Herzegovina	Spain	1–0	Germany	Austria and Sweden		
28	2027	Hungary						
29	2028	Portugal						
30	2029	Italy						

== Teams reaching the top four ==
Country	Winners	Runners-up	Third place	Fourth place	Semi-finalists	Total (top four)
Spain	8 (2004, 2017, 2018, 2022, 2023, 2024, 2025, 2026)	5 (2000, 2012, 2014, 2015, 2016)		1 (2001)	1 (2019)	14
Germany	6 (2000, 2001, 2002, 2006, 2007, 2011)	6 (1999, 2004, 2018, 2019, 2023, 2026)			7 (1998, 2005, 2008, 2010, 2013, 2015, 2017)	19
France	5 (2003, 2010, 2013, 2016, 2019)	6 (1998, 2002, 2005, 2006, 2017, 2025)		1 (2000)	6 (2007, 2009, 2015, 2022, 2023, 2024)	18
Sweden	3 (1999, 2012, 2015)	1 (2009)	1 (2000)		5 (1998, 2003, 2008, 2022, 2026)	9
England	1 (2009)	3 (2007, 2010, 2013)			3 (2002, 2003, 2024)	7
Netherlands	1 (2014)	1 (2024)			5 (2010, 2016, 2017, 2019, 2023)	7
Denmark	1 (1998)		1 (2001)		4 (2002, 2006, 2012, 2018)	6
Italy	1 (2008)		1 (1999)		3 (2004, 2011, 2025)	5
Russia	1 (2005)				2 (2004, 2006)	3
Norway		5 (2001, 2003, 2008, 2011, 2022)		1 (1999)	3 (2007, 2014, 2018)	9
Switzerland					3 (2009, 2011, 2016)	3
Finland					2 (2005, 2013)	2
Portugal					2 (2012, 2025)	2
Republic of Ireland					1 (2014)	1
Total	26	26	3	3	46	104

== Comprehensive team results by tournament (since 2002) ==
Legend

- 1st – Champions
- 2nd – Runners-up
- 3rd – Third place
- 4th – Fourth place
- SF – Semi-finals
- GS – Group stage
- 5th – Fifth place (played in 2005 and 2017)
- 6th – Sixth place (played in 2005 and 2017)
- • – Did not qualify
- × – Did not enter / Withdrew
- q – Qualified for upcoming tournament
- — Hosts

For each tournament, the number of teams in each finals tournament (in brackets) are shown.

Team	2002 (Sweden) (8)	2003 (Germany) (8)	2004 (Finland) (8)	2005 (Hungary) (8)	2006 (Switzerland) (8)	2007 (Iceland) (8)	2008 (France) (8)	2009 (Belarus) (8)	2010 (North Macedonia) (8)	2011 (Italy) (8)	2012 (Turkey) (8)	2013 (Wales) (8)	2014 (Norway) (8)	2015 (Israel) (8)	2016 (Slovakia) (8)	2017 (Northern Ireland) (8)	2018 (Switzerland) (8)	2019 (Scotland) (8)	2022 (Czech Republic) (8)	2023 (Belgium) (8)	2024 (Lithuania) (8)	2025 (Poland) (8)	2026 (Bosnia and Herzegovina) (8)	2027 (Hungary) (8)	Total
Austria	•	•	•	•	•	•	•	•	•	•	•	•	•	•	GS	•	•	•	•	5th	•	•	SF		3
Belarus	•	•	•	•	•	•	•	GS	•	•	•	•	•	•	•	•	•	•	×	•	•	•	•		1
Belgium	•	•	•	•	GS	•	•	•	•	GS	•	•	GS	•	•	•	•	GS	•	GS	•	•	•		5
Bosnia and Herzegovina	•	•	•	•	•	•	•	•	•	•	•	•	•	•	•	•	•	•	•	•	•	•	GS		1
Czech Republic	•	•	•	•	•	•	•	•	•	•	•	•	•	•	•	•	•	•	GS	GS	•	•	•		2
Denmark	SF	•	•	•	SF	GS	•	•	•	•	SF	GS	•	GS	•	•	SF	•	•	•	•	•	•		7
England	SF	SF	•	6th	•	2nd	GS	1st	2nd	•	GS	2nd	GS	GS	•	5th	•	GS	GS	•	SF	GS	•		16
Finland	•	•	GS	SF	•	•	•	•	•	•	•	SF	•	•	•	•	•	•	•	•	•	•	•		3
France	2nd	1st	GS	2nd	2nd	SF	GS	SF	1st	•	•	1st	•	SF	1st	2nd	GS	1st	SF	SF	SF	2nd	•		19
Germany	1st	GS	2nd	SF	1st	1st	SF	GS	SF	1st	•	SF	•	SF	GS	SF	2nd	2nd	GS	2nd	GS	•	2nd		20
Hungary	•	•	•	GS	•	•	•	•	•	•	•	•	•	•	•	•	•	•	•	•	•	•	•	Q	2
Iceland	•	•	•	•	•	GS	•	GS	•	•	•	•	•	•	•	•	•	•	•	6th	•	•	GS		4
Israel	•	•	•	•	•	•	•	•	•	•	•	•	•	GS	•	•	•	•	•	•	•	•	•		1
Italy	•	GS	SF	•	•	•	1st	•	GS	SF	•	•	•	•	•	GS	GS	•	GS	•	•	SF	•		9
Lithuania	•	•	•	•	•	•	•	•	•	•	•	•	•	•	•	•	•	•	•	•	GS	•	•		1
Netherlands	•	GS	•	•	GS	•	•	•	SF	GS	•	•	1st	•	SF	SF	GS	SF	•	SF	2nd	GS	•		12
North Macedonia	•	•	•	•	•	•	•	•	GS	•	•	•	•	•	•	•	•	•	•	•	•	•	•		1
Northern Ireland	•	•	•	•	•	•	•	•	•	•	•	•	•	•	•	GS	•	•	•	•	•	•	•		1
Norway	GS	2nd	GS	•	•	SF	2nd	GS	•	2nd	•	GS	SF	GS	GS	•	SF	GS	2nd	•	•	•	•		14
Poland	•	•	•	•	•	GS	•	•	•	•	•	•	•	•	•	•	•	•	•	•	•	GS	GS		3
Portugal	•	•	•	•	•	•	•	•	•	•	SF	•	•	•	•	•	•	•	•	•	•	SF	•		2
Republic of Ireland	•	•	•	•	•	•	•	•	•	•	•	•	SF	•	•	•	•	•	•	•	GS	•	•		2
Romania	•	•	•	•	•	•	•	•	•	•	GS	•	•	•	•	•	•	•	•	•	•	•	•		1
Russia	•	•	SF	1st	SF	•	•	•	•	GS	•	•	•	•	•	•	•	•	×	×	×	×	×	×	4
Scotland	•	•	•	GS	•	•	GS	•	GS	•	•	•	GS	•	•	6th	•	GS	•	•	•	•	•		6
Serbia	•	•	•	•	•	•	•	•	•	•	GS	•	•	•	•	•	•	•	•	•	GS	•	•		2
Slovakia	•	•	•	•	•	•	•	•	•	•	•	•	•	•	GS	•	•	•	•	•	•	•	•		1
Spain	GS	GS	1st	•	•	GS	GS	•	GS	GS	2nd	•	2nd	2nd	2nd	1st	1st	SF	1st	1st	1st	1st	1st		19
Sweden	GS	SF	•	•	GS	•	SF	2nd	•	•	1st	GS	GS	1st	•	•	•	•	SF	•	•	GS	SF		11
Switzerland	GS	•	GS	5th	GS	•	•	SF	•	SF	•	•	•	•	SF	•	GS	•	•	•	•	•	GS		9
Turkey	•	•	•	•	•	•	•	•	•	•	GS	•	•	•	•	•	•	•	•	•	•	•	•		1
Wales	•	•	•	•	•	•	•	•	•	•	•	GS	•	•	•	•	•	•	•	•	•	•	•		1

Since 2002, the third-place match has not been played.

== Tournament statistics ==
=== Top scorers by tournament ===
Year	Player	Goals
2002	(France) Claire Morel (Germany) Barbara Müller	4
2003	(Germany) Shelley Thompson	4
2004	(Germany) Anja Mittag	6
2005	(Russia) Elena Danilova	9
2006	(Russia) Elena Danilova	7
2007	(France) Marie-Laure Delie (Iceland) Fanndís Friðriksdóttir (England) Ellen White	3
2008	(Germany) Marie Pollmann	4
2009	(Sweden) Sofia Jakobsson	5
2010	(Germany) Turid Knaak (Netherlands) Lieke Martens	4
2011	(Norway) Melissa Bjånesøy	7
2012	(Sweden) Elin Rubensson	5
2013	(Germany) Pauline Bremer	6
2014	(Netherlands) Vivianne Miedema	6
2015	(Sweden) Stina Blackstenius	6
2016	(France) Marie-Antoinette Katoto	6
2017	(Spain) Patricia Guijarro	5
2018	(Denmark) Dajan Hashemi (Germany) Paulina Krumbiegel (Netherlands) Lynn Wilms (Denmark) Andrea Norheim (Spain) Olga Carmona (Switzerland) Alisha Lehmann (Switzerland) Géraldine Reuteler	2
2019	(France) Melvine Malard	4
2022	(Italy) Nicole Arcangeli	5
2023	(France) Louna Ribadeira	4
2024	(Serbia) Nina Matejić	5
2025	(France) Liana Joseph	4
2026	(Spain) Alba Cerrato (Spain) Ainoa Gómez (Spain) Rosalía Domínguez (Switzerland) Emanuela Pfister	3

=== Player of the Tournament ===
The UEFA selected a Golden Player or Player of the Tournament for certain tournaments.

Year	Player
2002	(Germany) Viola Odebrecht
2003	(France) Sarah Bouhaddi
2004	(Germany) Anja Mittag
2005	(Russia) Elena Danilova
2006	(Germany) Isabel & Monique Kerschowski
2007	(England) Fern Whelan
2008	(Italy) Sara Gama
2009	(Switzerland) Ramona Bachmann
2010	(North Macedonia) Nataša Andonova
2011	(Germany) Ramona Petzelberger
2012	(Sweden) Elin Rubensson
2013	(France) Sandie Toletti
2014	(Netherlands) Vivianne Miedema
2015	(Sweden) Stina Blackstenius
2016	(France) Marie-Antoinette Katoto
2017	(Spain) Patricia Guijarro
2018	–
2019	–
2022	–
2023	(France) Louna Ribadeira
2024	(Spain) Daniela Agote
2025	(France) Maeline Mendy
2026	(Spain) Rosalía Domínguez

== See also ==
- FIFA Women's World Cup
- FIFA U-20 Women's World Cup
- FIFA U-17 Women's World Cup
- UEFA Women's Under-17 Championship
- UEFA Women's Championship
- UEFA Women's Champions League
