= 2022 OFC U-20 Women's Championship =

Tournament details
- Host country: TBC
- Dates: June 2022
- Teams: TBC (maximum 11) (from 1 confederation)

The 2022 OFC U-20 Women's Championship, originally to be held as the 2021 OFC U-19 Women's Championship, will be the 10th edition of the OFC U-19/U-20 Women's Championship, the biennial international youth football championship organised by the Oceania Football Confederation (OFC) for the women's under-19/under-20 national teams of Oceania. The host country of the tournament has yet to be announced. The winner of the tournament will qualify for the 2022 FIFA U-20 Women's World Cup in Costa Rica as the OFC representatives.

The tournament was originally scheduled to be held in July 2021. However, the OFC announced on 4 March 2021 that it had been postponed due to the COVID-19 pandemic, pending FIFA's confirmation of dates of the 2022 FIFA U-20 Women's World Cup. On 4 June 2021, the OFC announced that the tournament had been rescheduled to April 2022, with the name of the tournament changed from "2021 OFC U-19 Women's Championship" to "2022 OFC U-20 Women's Championship".

New Zealand are the seven-time defending champions.

== Teams ==
All 11 FIFA-affiliated national teams from OFC are eligible to enter the tournament.

Team	Appearance	Previous best performance
American Samoa	4th	Fourth place (2010)
Cook Islands (hosts)	4th	Runners-up (2010)
Fiji	5th	Runners-up (2017)
New Caledonia	6th	Runners-up (2019)
New Zealand	9th	Champions (2006, 2010, 2012, 2014, 2015, 2017, 2019)
Papua New Guinea	7th	Runners-up (2004, 2012, 2014)
Samoa	7th	Fourth place (2002, 2006, 2012)
Solomon Islands	4th	Third place (2004)
Tahiti	2nd	Third place (2019)
Tonga	8th	Runners-up (2006)
Vanuatu	5th	Third place (2015)

== Venue ==
To be confirmed.

== Squads ==
Players born on or after 1 January 2002 are eligible to compete in the tournament.

== Qualified teams for FIFA U-20 Women's World Cup ==
The following team from OFC qualify for the 2022 FIFA U-20 Women's World Cup.

Team	Qualified on	Previous appearances in FIFA U-20 Women's World Cup^{1}
TBD	April 2022	

^{1} Bold indicates champions for that year. Italic indicates hosts for that year.
