= 2025 OFC U-19 Women's Championship =

Tournament details
- Host country: (French Polynesia) Tahiti
- City: Papeete
- Dates: 21 September – 4 October 2025
- Teams: 7 (from 1 confederation)
- Venue: 1 (in 1 host city)

Final positions
- Champions: New Zealand (9th title)
- Runners-up: New Caledonia
- Third place: Fiji
- Fourth place: Cook Islands

Tournament statistics
- Matches played: 14
- Goals scored: 50 (3.57 per match)
- Top scorer(s): (New Zealand) Emily Lyon (11 goals)
- Best player: (New Zealand) Zoe Benson
- Best goalkeeper: (New Caledonia) Elizabeth Aben

The 2025 OFC U-19 Women's Championship was the 11th edition of the OFC U-19/U-20 Women's Championship, the biennial international youth football championship organized by the Oceania Football Confederation (OFC) for the women's under-19/under-20 national teams of Oceania. The tournament was held in Tahiti from 21 September to 4 October 2025.

The two finalists qualified for the 2026 FIFA U-20 Women's World Cup in Poland as the OFC representatives.

New Zealand were the defending champions from 2023, and retained their title.

== Teams ==
Tonga won the qualifying tournament on home soil in March, beating American Samoa and Solomon Islands, to qualify for the finals tournament. All but one of the other 8 FIFA-affiliated national teams from OFC entered the tournament (Papua New Guinea choosing not to enter).

Samoa pulled out of the tournament due to the financial reasons announcing their decision on 11 September 2025.

Team	Appearance	Previous best performance	Nickname
Cook Islands	5th	Runners-up (2010)	Young Cooks
Fiji	6th	Runners-up (2017, 2023)	Young Kulas
New Caledonia	7th	Runners-up (2019)	Cagou Girls
New Zealand	10th	Champions (2006, 2010, 2012, 2014, 2015, 2017, 2019, 2023)	Junior Football Ferns
Tahiti (hosts)	3nd	Third place (2019)	Hine Taure’a
Tonga	9th	Runners-up (2006)	Junior Mataliki
Vanuatu	6th	Third place (2015)	

== Venues ==
The main stadium at Tahiti – Stade Pater – is preparing for the 2027 Pacific Games. The first stadiums for the tournament is Stade de Punaruu. There was a controversy in 2016, when the stadium was renovated for 76 millions cfp, but the athletics track did not meet IAAF criteria. The second stadium is Stade Paea (also called Stade Manu Ura). It has a capacity of about 2,500 spectators, with a natural grass surface. Its main tenant is AS Manu Ura.

== Media coverage ==
All games were streamed via FIFA+ platform as Fifa+ holds rights for all OFC competitions in the period 2024–2025. The commentary was provided from Asinate Wainiqolo. They taught the audience pronunciation of native players names.

== Group stage ==
The top two of each group advance to the semifinals.

All times are local, TAHT (GMT+12).

=== Group A ===
Pos	Team	Pld	W	D	L	GF	GA	GD	Pts	Qualification
1	Fiji	2	2	0	0	4	2	+2	6	Knockout stage
2	Cook Islands	2	1	0	1	2	2	0	3	Knockout stage
3	Tonga	2	0	0	2	1	3	−2	0	Fifth place match
4	Samoa (W)	0	0	0	0	0	0	0	0	Withdrew

Source: OFC
(W) Withdrew

Metuamaru Arere curled home a free kick from 25 metres to give her side hard-fought 1–0 victory over Tonga

21 September 2025
15:00

Cook Islands	1–0	Tonga
Arere 19'	Report

Stade de Punaruu, Papeete
Attendance: 100
Referee: Anna-Marie Keighley (New Zealand)

Goalkeeping error, ultimately sealed the points for Fiji in the game against Cook Islands and moved Young Kulas closer to semis.

24 September 2025
15:00

Fiji	2–1	Cook Islands
Reva 4'; Finau 55'	Report	Mose 25'

Stade de Punaruu, Papeete
Attendance: 200
Referee: Beth Rattray (New Zealand)

Fiji booked their spot in the semi-finals, but their performance also justifies their aim to book U-20 World Cup spot. Despite Tonga's relentless pressure in the final stages, the Young Kulas held firm

27 September 2025
15:00

Tonga	1–2	Fiji
Makaafi 71'	Report	Tabunase 8'; Naweni 11'

Stade Paea, Papeete
Attendance: 80
Referee: Kyllian Lelarge (New Caledonia)

=== Group B ===
Pos	Team	Pld	W	D	L	GF	GA	GD	Pts	Qualification
1	New Zealand	3	3	0	0	22	0	+22	9	Knockout stage
2	New Caledonia	3	1	1	1	2	5	−3	4	Knockout stage
3	Tahiti (H)	3	1	1	1	3	8	−5	4	Fifth place match
4	Vanuatu	3	0	0	3	0	14	−14	0	

Source: OFC
(H) Hosts

A brilliant individual effort from captain Julia Honakoko six minutes from full-time gave New Caledonia a crucial 1–0 win over Vanuatu.The talismanic striker hit a curling right-footed effort past Jineth Vanva in the Vanuatu goal when the match had seemed destined to end in a stalemate. Defending champions New Zealand have started their campaign with a 7–0 victory over hosts Tahiti.

22 September 2025
11:00

New Caledonia	1–0	Vanuatu
Honakoko 84'	Report

Stade Paea, Papeete
Attendance: 50
Referee: Torika Delai (Fiji)
22 September 2025
15:00

New Zealand	7–0	Tahiti
L. Brazendale 12', 49'; Mortlock 14'; Lyon 37'; Benson 44'; Brown 64'; De Wit 89'	Report

Stade Paea, Papeete
Attendance: 100
Referee: Azusa Sugino (Japan)

The host Tahiti beat Vanautu 2–0. Vanuatu coach Ranua saw improvement in other areas than converting changes. New Zealand then reached last four beating New Caledonia 4–0. Tuvalu at September 2025 futsal nations cup lost all games, but their game was skilled and promising, Vanuatu young women team sometimes lacks totally basic skills like a shot. IIHF Women's World Championship in ice-hockey has tournament model suitable for Oceania. 5 top quality teams play upper round-robin group. 5 middle quality teams play lower group. 8 teams then compete in play-off, so teams from lower group can win tournament, but that never happened due to different quality of teams.

25 September 2025
11:00

New Zealand	4–0	New Caledonia
L. Brazendale 16'; De Wit 70'; Benson 86' (pen.), 90+3'	Report

Stade Paea, Papeete
Attendance: 100
Referee: Shu Ting Yang (China)
25 September 2025
15:00

Vanuatu	0–2	Tahiti
	Report	Le Gayic 11', 25'

Stade Paea, Papeete
Attendance: 200
Referee: Yantana Atoa (Tonga)

Vanuatu ended their campaign with a 11–0 defeat at the hands of regional giants New Zealand. Relief came for host Tahiti in the 88th minute: Haranui Le Gayic won a penalty and converted it, but the semi-final hopes of the entire stadium were not fulfilled in a thrilling end

28 September 2025
11:00

Vanuatu	0–11	New Zealand
	Report	De Wit 13'; O'Brien 18'; Brill 23'; Lyon 31', 41', 67', 68', 78'; Benson 57'; Brown 60'; L. Brazendale 88'

Stade Paea, Papeete
Attendance: 80
Referee: Shama Maemae (Solomon Islands)
28 September 2025
15:00

Tahiti	1–1	New Caledonia
Honakoko 55'	Report	Le Gayic 89' (pen.)

Stade Paea, Papeete
Attendance: 400
Referee: Jovita Ambrose (Solomon Islands)

== Knockout stage ==
=== Bracket ===
Semi-finals
1 October – Papeete (Paea)
Fiji	0
New Caledonia	2
1 October – Papeete (Paea)
New Zealand	8
Cook Islands	0

Final
4 October – Papeete (Paea)
New Caledonia	0
New Zealand	3
Third place match
4 October – Papeete (Paea)
Fiji (p)	0 (3)
Cook Islands	0 (2)

=== Semi-finals ===
Winners qualify for 2026 FIFA U-20 Women's World Cup.

New Zealand has impressive route throughout the tournament, but media are silent except of official OFC channels. Fiji defeat to New Caledonia was found surprising and against the run of play as Fiji dominated most of the time.

1 October 2025
11:00

Fiji	0–2	New Caledonia
Naweni (yellow card) 42' (yellow-red card) 90'	Report	Gondou 59'; Naaoutchoue 71'

Stade Paea, Papeete
Attendance: 100
Referee: Anna-Marie Keighley (New Zealand)
1 October 2025
15:00

New Zealand	8–0	Cook Islands
Benson 33'; Lyon 36', 41', 55'; Cleall-Harding 67'; L. Brazendale 76', 89'; O'Brien 86'	Report

Stade Paea, Papeete
Attendance: 150
Referee: Azusa Sugino (Japan)

New Zealand tournament victory was labelled as logical in French speaking media Holding their nerve was crucial for Fiji's youngsters to clinch the victory and confirm their podium finish according to Fiji voices

=== Fifth place match ===
2 October 2025
15:00

Tonga	2–1	Tahiti
Faletau 25', 37'	Report	Teikihaa 73'

Stade de Punaruu, Papeete
Attendance: 75
Referee: Shu Ting Yang (China)

=== Third place match ===
4 October 2025
11:00

Fiji	0–0	Cook Islands
	Report
Penalties
Vunivalu (penalty missed); Tabunase (penalty scored); Dama (penalty missed); Mereia (penalty scored); Matawaqa (penalty scored)	3–2	Casey Poila (penalty missed); Uini (penalty missed); Tuariki (penalty missed); Taia (penalty scored); Arere (penalty scored)

Stade Paea, Papeete
Attendance: 200
Referee: Jovita Ambrose (Solomon Islands)

=== Final ===
4 October 2025
15:00

New Caledonia	0–3	New Zealand
	Report	Benson 17'; Lyon 36', 45'

Stade Paea, Papeete
Referee: Torika Delai (Fiji)

New Caledonia	New Zealand

GK	16	Muneiko Aline Waheo
LB	2	Louane Pocoue-Kasouemi		(substituted off) 34'
CB	5	Kenza Kenon (c)
CB	21	Ashley Geihaze		(substituted off) 45'
CB	6	Shirley Wenessia
RB	17	Alesie Adjou		(substituted off) 45'
LM	11	Caénah Bati	(yellow card) 51'	(substituted off) 52'
CM	19	Cécilia Waheo
CM	8	Kheiméra Gondou
RM	18	Valerie Ngazo
CF	13	Joyce Angexetine		(substituted off) 34'
Substitutions:
GK	1	Elizabeth Aben
FW	3	Deyanera Michel
DF	4	Lleana Hmae		(substituted on) 45'
DF	7	Aziliz Naaoutchoue
FW	9	Julia Honakoko		(substituted on) 34'
FW	10	Cina Kourevi		(substituted on) 34'
FW	14	Ajassië Taine		(substituted on) 52'
DF	15	Dahlia Houmbouy
DF	20	Kelia Golitin		(substituted on) 45'
Manager:
Léon Waitronyie

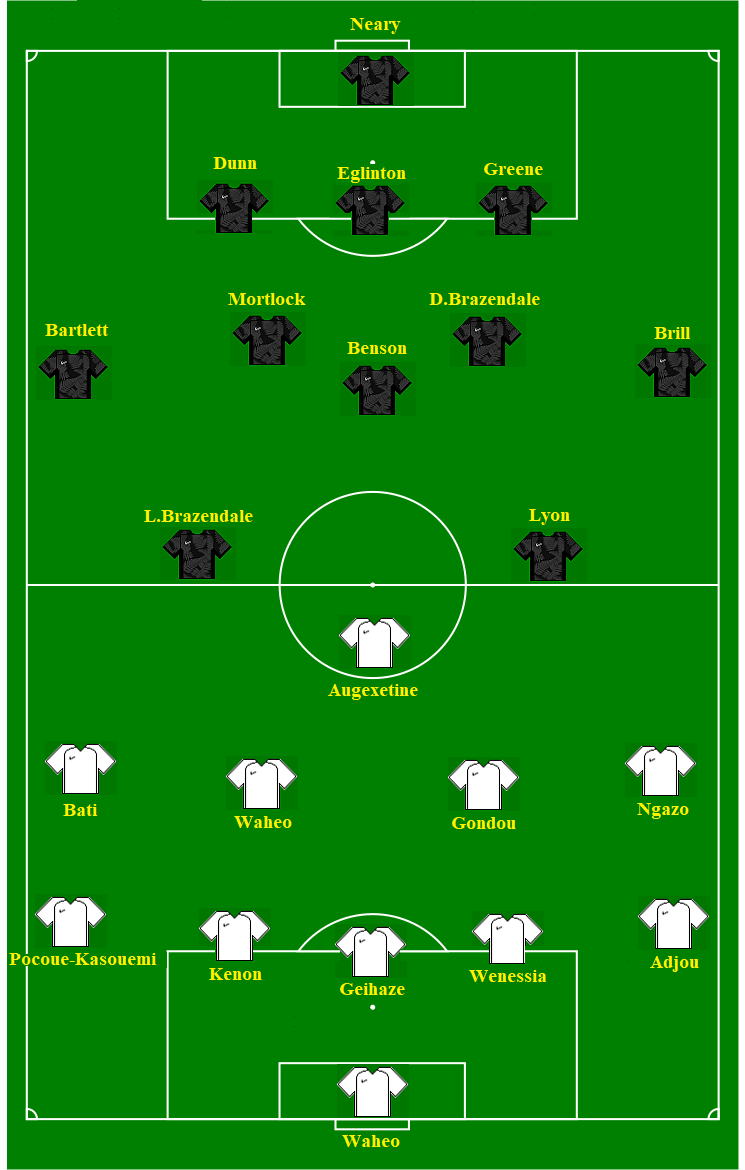

GK	1	Brooke Neary
CB	2	Charli Dunn	(yellow card) 90'
CB	5	Alyssha Eglinton
CB	3	Mackenzie Greene
LM	4	Penny Brill
CM	6	Daisy Brazendale (c)	(yellow card) 43'	(substituted off) 46'
CM	10	Zoe Benson		(substituted off) 46'
CM	8	Lottie Mortlock		(substituted off) 61'
RM	7	Grace Bartlett		(substituted off) 61'
CF	11	Emily Lyon
CF	16	Lily Brazendale		(substituted off) 46'
Substitutions:
FW	9	Isla Cleall-Harding		(substituted on) 46'
FW	12	Amber De Wit		(substituted on) 46'
MF	13	Mary Brown		(substituted on) 61'
DF	14	Kenzie Longmuir		(substituted on) 46'
MF	15	Ela Jerez
DF	17	Poppy O'Brien		(substituted on) 61'
GK	18	Sophie Campbell
Manager:
Callum Holmes

Player of the Match:
Mackenzie Greene (New Zealand)

Assistant referees:
Maria Salamasina (Samoa)
Stephanie Minan (Papua New Guinea)
Fourth official:
Azusa Sugino (Japan)
Fiftth official:
Feliuaki Kolotau (Tonga)

== Awards ==
The following awards were given at the conclusion of the tournament.

Award	Player
Golden Ball	(New Zealand) Zoe Benson
Golden Boot	(New Zealand) Emily Lyon
Golden Gloves	(New Caledonia) Elizabeth Aben
Fair Play Award	Cook Islands

== Qualified teams for FIFA U-20 Women's World Cup 2026 ==
The following teams from OFC qualified for the 2026 FIFA U-20 Women's World Cup in Poland.

Teams	Qualified on	Previous appearances in FIFA U-20 Women's World Cup
New Caledonia	1 October 2025	0 (debut)
New Zealand	1 October 2025	9 (2006, 2008, 2010, 2012, 2014, 2016, 2018, 2022, 2024)

== Goalscorers ==
There were 50 goals scored in 14 matches, for an average of 3.57 goals per match.

11 goals

- (New Zealand) Emily Lyon

6 goals

- (New Zealand) Lily Brazendale
- (New Zealand) Zoe Benson

3 goals

- (New Zealand) Amber De Wit
- (French Polynesia) Haranui Le Gayic

2 goals

- (New Zealand) Mary Brown
- (New Caledonia) Julia Honakoko
- (New Zealand) Poppy O'Brien
- (Tonga) Tama’a Faletau

1 goal

- (Cook Islands) Metuamaru Arere
- (Cook Islands) Aikitu Mose
- (Fiji) Adi Reva
- (Fiji) Annie Finau
- (Fiji) Elesi Tabunase
- (Fiji) Sereana Naweni
- (New Caledonia) Kheiméra Gondou
- (New Caledonia) Aziliz Naaoutchoue
- (New Zealand) Lottie Mortlock
- (New Zealand) Penny Brill
- (New Zealand) Isla Cleall-Harding
- (French Polynesia) Catherine Teikihaa
- (Tonga) Anela Makaafi

== Match officials ==
Main referees

- (Taiwan) Shu ting Yang
- (Fiji) Torika Delai
- (Japan) Azusa Sugino
- (New Caledonia) Kyllian Lelarge
- (New Zealand) Anna-Marie Keighley
- (New Zealand) Beth Rattray
- (Solomon Islands) Jovita Ambrose
- (Solomon Islands) Shama Maemae
- (Tonga) Yantama Atoa

Assistants

- (New Caledonia) Louis Hnangan
- (New Zealand) Allys Clipsham
- (New Zealand) Heloise Simmons
- (Fiji) Saleyah Tasmiyah
- (Papua New Guinea) Stephanie Minan
- (Samoa) Maria Salamasina
- (Tonga) Alisson Elone
- (Tonga) Feliuaki Kolotau
- (Vanuatu) Madlen Ruben
