= 2023 OFC U-19 Women's Championship =

Tournament details
- Host country: Fiji
- City: Lautoka/Suva
- Dates: 21 June – 8 July 2023
- Teams: 10 (from 1 confederation)
- Venue: 2 (in 2 host cities)

Final positions
- Champions: New Zealand (8th title)
- Runners-up: Fiji
- Third place: Samoa
- Fourth place: Cook Islands

Tournament statistics
- Matches played: 20
- Goals scored: 88 (4.4 per match)
- Attendance: 3,841 (192 per match)
- Top scorer(s): (New Zealand) Ruby Nathan (8 goals)
- Best player: (New Zealand) Helena Errington
- Best goalkeeper: (Cook Islands) Kimberley Uini

The 2023 OFC U-19 Women's Championship was the 10th edition of the OFC U-19/U-20 Women's Championship, the biennial international youth football championship organised by the Oceania Football Confederation (OFC) for the women's under-19/under-20 national teams of Oceania. The tournament was held in Fiji from 21 June to 8 July 2023.

The winner of the tournament qualified for the 2024 FIFA U-20 Women's World Cup in Colombia as the OFC representative. The runner-up of the tournament eventually also qualified as an additional slot was allocated to OFC.

New Zealand were the defending champions from 2019.

== Teams ==
All but one of the 11 FIFA-affiliated national teams from OFC entered the tournament.

Team	Appearance	Previous best performance
Cook Islands	4th	Runners-up (2010)
Fiji (hosts)	5th	Runners-up (2017)
New Caledonia	6th	Runners-up (2019)
New Zealand	9th	Champions (2006, 2010, 2012, 2014, 2015, 2017, 2019)
Papua New Guinea	7th	Runners-up (2004, 2012, 2014)
Samoa	7th	Runners-up (2015)
Solomon Islands	4th	Third place (2004)
Tahiti	2nd	Third place (2019)
Tonga	8th	Runners-up (2006)
Vanuatu	5th	Third place (2015)

== Group stage ==
The top two of each group and the best two third place teams advance to the quarterfinals.

All times are local, FJT (GMT+12).

=== Group A ===
Pos	Team	Pld	W	D	L	GF	GA	GD	Pts	Qualification
1	New Caledonia	3	3	0	0	11	1	+10	9	Knockout stage
2	Samoa	3	2	0	1	6	4	+2	6	Knockout stage
3	Vanuatu	3	1	0	2	8	7	+1	3	Knockout stage
4	Tonga	3	0	0	3	1	14	−13	0	

Source: OFC
21 June 2023
12:00

New Caledonia	1–0	Samoa
Pawawi 56'	Report

Churchill Park, Lautoka
Attendance: 147
Referee: Torika Delai (Fiji)
21 June 2023
15:00

Vanuatu	5–0	Tonga
Aruvuha 11', 14'; Poida 35', 67'; Woka 45+2'	Report

Churchill Park, Lautoka
Attendance: 124
Referee: Shama Maemae (Solomon Islands)

24 June 2023
12:00

New Caledonia	4–1	Vanuatu
Leme 7'; Honakoko 17'; Naaoutchoue 19'; Hnaune 62'	Report	Woka 51'

Churchill Park, Lautoka
Attendance: 367
Referee: Caleb Downes (New Zealand)
24 June 2023
15:00

Tonga	1–3	Samoa
Fakavai 86'	Report	A. Skeers 60'; Avei 67', 75'

Churchill Park, Lautoka
Attendance: 178
Referee: Keith Kitumbing (Papua New Guinea)

27 June 2023
12:00

Tonga	0–6	New Caledonia
	Report	Hmaen 6'; Boarat 33'; Binet 49' (pen.); Naaoutchoue 77'; Pocoue-Kasouemi 79'; Honakoko 90+3'

Churchill Park, Lautoka
Attendance: 201
Referee: Shama Maemae (Solomon Islands)
27 June 2023
15:00

Samoa	3–2	Vanuatu
T. Skeers 48'; Kavick 86' (o.g.); Dowsing 88'	Report	Aruvuha 1'; Vuti 76'

Churchill Park, Lautoka
Attendance: 200
Referee: Torika Delai (Fiji)

=== Group B ===
Pos	Team	Pld	W	D	L	GF	GA	GD	Pts	Qualification
1	New Zealand	2	2	0	0	14	0	+14	6	Knockout stage
2	Fiji (H)	2	1	0	1	2	3	−1	3	Knockout stage
3	Papua New Guinea	2	0	0	2	0	13	−13	0	

Source: OFC
(H) Hosts
22 June 2023
16:00

New Zealand	3–0	Fiji
Pijnenburg 15'; Trewhitt 65', 74'	Report

HFC Bank Stadium, Suva
Attendance: 400
Referee: David Yareboinen (Papua New Guinea)

25 June 2023
16:00

New Zealand	11–0	Papua New Guinea
Elliott 3'; Cook 12', 20', 24', 54'; Errington 18', 71'; Benson 21', 37', 48', 56'	Report

HFC Bank Stadium, Suva
Attendance: 150
Referee: Timothy Niu (Solomon Islands)

28 June 2023
16:00

Fiji	2–0	Papua New Guinea
Tabua 40'; Buka 90+4'	Report

HFC Bank Stadium, Suva
Attendance: 400
Referee: Carlito Martin (Tahiti)

=== Group C ===
Pos	Team	Pld	W	D	L	GF	GA	GD	Pts	Qualification
1	Cook Islands	2	1	1	0	1	0	+1	4	Knockout stage
2	Solomon Islands	2	1	0	1	1	1	0	3	Knockout stage
3	Tahiti	2	0	1	1	0	1	−1	1	Knockout stage

Source: OFC
22 June 2023
19:00

Tahiti	0–1	Solomon Islands
	Report	Masi 50'

HFC Bank Stadium, Suva
Attendance: 200
Referee: Chris Bennett (New Zealand)

25 June 2023
19:00

Tahiti	0–0	Cook Islands
	Report

HFC Bank Stadium, Suva
Attendance: 150
Referee: Tellos Kaufusi (Tonga)

28 June 2023
19:00

Solomon Islands	0–1	Cook Islands
	Report	Tuariki 49'

HFC Bank Stadium, Suva
Attendance: 274
Referee: Mohammed Altaf (Fiji)

=== Ranking of third-placed teams ===
Due to groups having a different number of teams, the results against the fourth-placed teams in four-team groups were not be considered for this ranking.

Pos	Grp	Team	Pld	W	D	L	GF	GA	GD	Pts	Qualification
1	C	Tahiti	2	0	1	1	0	1	−1	1	Knockout stage
2	A	Vanuatu	2	0	0	2	8	7	+1	0	Knockout stage
3	B	Papua New Guinea	2	0	0	2	0	13	−13	0	

Source: OFC

== Knockout stage ==
The knockout stage draw took place on 28 June 2023 at the completion of the group stage.

=== Qualified teams ===
The winners and runners-up of each of the three groups and the two best third-placed teams advance to the quarter-finals.

Group	Winners	Runners-up	Third place
A	New Caledonia	Samoa	Vanuatu
B	New Zealand	Fiji	—N/a
C	Cook Islands	Solomon Islands	Tahiti

=== Bracket ===
Quarter-finals
1 July – Suva
Samoa (p)	1 (4)
Tahiti	1 (3)
1 July – Suva
New Caledonia	0
Fiji	1
2 July – Suva
New Zealand	19
Solomon Islands	0
2 July – Suva
Cook Islands	2
Vanuatu	1

Semi-finals
5 July – Suva
Samoa	1
Fiji	3
5 July – Suva
New Zealand	5
Cook Islands	0

Final
8 July – Suva
Fiji	0
New Zealand	7
Third place match
8 July – Suva
Samoa	2
Cook Islands	1

=== Quarter-finals ===
1 July 2023
15:00

Samoa	1–1 (a.e.t.)	Tahiti
Taeaoalii 45+1'	Report	Vivish 79' (pen.)
Penalties
Lilii Moa (penalty scored); Stuart (penalty missed); Fesolai (penalty scored); A. Skeers (penalty scored); Dowsing (penalty missed); Humphries (penalty missed); Taeoalii (penalty scored)	4–3	(penalty scored) Le Gayic; (penalty missed) Haoatai; (penalty scored) Vivish; (penalty missed) El Hadj Kaddour; (penalty scored) Hamblin; (penalty missed) Launduren; (penalty missed) Tagi

HFC Bank Stadium, Suva
Attendance: 250
Referee: Timothy Niu (Solomon Islands)
1 July 2023
19:00

New Caledonia	0–1	Fiji
	Report	Mereia 85'

HFC Bank Stadium, Suva
Attendance: 400
Referee: Caleb Downes (New Zealand)
2 July 2023
15:00

New Zealand	19–0	Solomon Islands
McCann 9', 28', 34'; Nathan 13', 43', 51', 88', 90'; Benson 14', 55', 62'; Canham 16', 39'; Bercelli 19', 22', 36', 74'; Pijnenburg 45'; Colpi 68'	Report

HFC Bank Stadium, Suva
Attendance: 100
Referee: Tellos Kaufusi (Tonga)
2 July 2023
19:00

Cook Islands	2–1	Vanuatu
Taia 20'; Mapu 65'	Report	Aruvuha 31'

HFC Bank Stadium, Suva
Attendance: 300
Referee: Carlito Martin (Tahiti)

=== Semi-finals ===
Winners qualified for 2024 FIFA U-20 Women's World Cup.

5 July 2023
15:00

Samoa	1–3	Fiji
A. Skeers 86' (pen.)	Report	Alfred 44'; Ana 45+3'; Singh 69'

HFC Bank Stadium, Suva
Attendance: 500
Referee: Shama Maemae (Solomon Islands)
5 July 2023
19:00

New Zealand	5–0	Cook Islands
Rouru 22' (o.g.); Pijnenburg 26'; Colpi 45+2'; Nathan 70'; Bercelli 87'	Report

HFC Bank Stadium, Suva
Attendance: 150
Referee: Tojika Delai (Fiji)

=== Third place match ===
8 July 2023
13:00

Samoa	2–1	Cook Islands
A. Skeers 78', 90+7' (pen.)	Report	Enoka 89'

HFC Bank Stadium, Suva
Attendance: 100
Referee: Torika Delai (Fiji)

=== Final ===
8 July 2023
19:00

Fiji	0–7	New Zealand
	Report	Elliott 13', 31'; McCann 40'; Nathan 52', 65'; Mortlock 74'; Pijnenburg 78' (pen.)

HFC Bank Stadium, Suva
Attendance: 985
Referee: Shama Maemae (Solomon Islands)

== Awards ==
2023 OFC U-19 Women's Championship

New Zealand
Eighth title

Award	Winner
Golden Ball	(New Zealand) Helena Errington
Golden Boot	(New Zealand) Ruby Nathan
Golden Glove	(Cook Islands) Kimberley Uini

== Qualified teams for FIFA U-20 Women's World Cup 2024 ==
The following teams from OFC qualified for the 2024 FIFA U-20 Women's World Cup in Colombia.

Teams	Qualified on	Previous appearances in FIFA U-20 Women's World Cup
New Zealand	8 July 2023	8 (2006, 2008, 2010, 2012, 2014, 2016, 2018, 2022)
Fiji	4 October 2023 (Note: After the announcement of the expansion of the 2024 FIFA U-20 Women's World Cup to 24 teams, Fiji took the new second spot as OFC representative as they ended second in this tournament.)	0 (debut)

== Goalscorers ==
There were 88 goals scored in 20 matches, for an average of 4.4 goals per match.

8 goals

- (New Zealand) Ruby Nathan

7 goals

- (New Zealand) Zoe Benson

5 goals

- (New Zealand) Kiara Bercelli

4 goals

- (New Zealand) Alexis Cook
- (New Zealand) Ella McCann
- (New Zealand) Emma Pijnenburg
- (Samoa) Arianna Skeers
- (Vanuatu) Elina Aruvuha

3 goals

- (New Zealand) Manaia Elliott

2 goals

- (New Caledonia) Julia Honakoko
- (New Caledonia) Caroline Naaoutchoue
- (New Zealand) Danielle Canham
- (New Zealand) Lara Colpi
- (New Zealand) Helena Errington
- (New Zealand) Rebekah Trewhitt
- (Samoa) Whitney Avei
- (Vanuatu) Angelina Poida
- (Vanuatu) Rebina Woka

1 goal

- (Cook Islands) Abrihana Enoka
- (Cook Islands) Hereatea Mapu
- (Cook Islands) Jan Taia
- (Cook Islands) Te Upoko Tuariki
- (Fiji) Sonia Alfred
- (Fiji) Timaima Ana
- (Fiji) Evivi Buka
- (Fiji) Ema Mereia
- (Fiji) Preeya Singh
- (Fiji) Kasanita Tabua
- (New Caledonia) Maria Binet
- (New Caledonia) Sarah Boarat
- (New Caledonia) Alofa Hmaen
- (New Caledonia) Ronaldine Hnaune
- (New Caledonia) Laëtitia Leme
- (New Caledonia) Adran Pawawi
- (New Caledonia) Louane Pocoue-Kasouemi
- (New Zealand) Charlotte Mortlock
- (Samoa) Lilly Dowsing
- (Samoa) Tamani Skeers
- (Samoa) Sariah Taeaoalii
- (Solomon Islands) Salome Masi
- (French Polynesia) Krystal Vivish
- (Tonga) Ana Fakavai
- (Vanuatu) Nellie Vuti

1 own goal

- (Cook Islands) Tearoa Rouru (against New Zealand)
- (Vanuatu) Herveline Kavick (against Samoa)
