= 2019 OFC U-19 Women's Championship =

Tournament details
- Host country: Cook Islands
- City: Rarotonga
- Dates: 30 August – 12 September 2019
- Teams: 11 (from 1 confederation)
- Venue: 1 (in 1 host city)

Final positions
- Champions: New Zealand (7th title)
- Runners-up: New Caledonia
- Third place: Tahiti
- Fourth place: Vanuatu

Tournament statistics
- Matches played: 19
- Goals scored: 120 (6.32 per match)
- Attendance: 4,840 (255 per match)
- Top scorer: (New Zealand) Kelli Brown (21 goals)
- Best player: (New Zealand) Grace Wisnewski
- Best goalkeeper: (French Polynesia) Corail Harry
- Fair play award: Solomon Islands

The 2019 OFC U-19 Women's Championship was the 9th edition of the OFC U-19/U-20 Women's Championship, the biennial international youth football championship organised by the Oceania Football Confederation (OFC) for the women's under-19/under-20 national teams of Oceania. The tournament was held in the Cook Islands from 30 August to 12 September 2019.

The winner of the tournament would have qualified for the 2021 FIFA U-20 Women's World Cup (originally 2020 but postponed due to COVID-19 pandemic) in Costa Rica as the OFC representatives. However, FIFA announced on 17 November 2020 that this edition of the World Cup would be cancelled.

New Zealand were the defending champions, and they went on to win the 2019 Championship.

== Teams ==
All 11 FIFA-affiliated national teams from OFC entered the tournament.

Team	Appearance	Previous best performance
American Samoa	3rd	Fourth place (2010)
Cook Islands (hosts)	3rd	Runners-up (2010)
Fiji	4th	Runners-up (2017)
New Caledonia	5th	Third place (2012)
New Zealand	8th	Champions (2006, 2010, 2012, 2014, 2015, 2017)
Papua New Guinea	6th	Runners-up (2004, 2012, 2014)
Samoa	6th	Fourth place (2002, 2006, 2012)
Solomon Islands	3rd	Third place (2004)
Tahiti	1st	Debut
Tonga	7th	Runners-up (2006)
Vanuatu	4th	Third place (2015)

== Venue ==
The matches were played at the CIFA Academy Field, Rarotonga.

== Squads ==
Players born on or after 1 January 2000 were eligible to compete in the tournament.

== Draw ==
The draw of the tournament was held on 17 April 2019 at the OFC Academy in Auckland, New Zealand. The 11 teams were drawn into three groups, with Groups A and B having four teams and Group C having three teams. The hosts Cook Islands were assigned to group position A1, while the remaining teams were drawn into the other group positions without any seeding, with the only restriction that the defending champions New Zealand must be drawn into Group A or B.

== Group stage ==
The winners of each group and the runners-up of Group B advanced to the semi-finals.

All times are local, CKT (UTC−10).

=== Group A ===
Pos	Team	Pld	W	D	L	GF	GA	GD	Pts	Qualification
1	Vanuatu	3	2	0	1	5	1	+4	6	Knockout stage
2	Fiji	3	2	0	1	4	2	+2	6	
3	Cook Islands (H)	3	1	0	2	1	2	−1	3	
4	Solomon Islands	3	1	0	2	2	7	−5	3	

Source: OFC
(H) Hosts
30 August 2019
13:00

Solomon Islands	1–3	Fiji
Nari 43'	Report	Diranuve 23', 67'; Qereqeretabua 60' (pen.)

CIFA Academy Field, Rarotonga
Attendance: 220
Referee: Lindsey Robinson (England)
30 August 2019
16:00

Vanuatu	0–1	Cook Islands
	Report	Moekaa 90'

CIFA Academy Field, Rarotonga
Attendance: 400
Referee: Rani Perry (Tahiti)

2 September 2019
13:00

Vanuatu	4–0	Solomon Islands
Ngwele 20'; Erikan 36', 44'; Sine 79'	Report

CIFA Academy Field, Rarotonga
Attendance: 200
Referee: Anne Tuaefe (Tonga)
2 September 2019
16:00

Cook Islands	0–1	Fiji
	Report	Likuculacula 59'

CIFA Academy Field, Rarotonga
Attendance: 400
Referee: Roger Adams (Papua New Guinea)

5 September 2019
13:00

Fiji	0–1	Vanuatu
	Report	C. Kalopong 35'

CIFA Academy Field, Rarotonga
Attendance: 220
Referee: Rani Perry (Tahiti)
5 September 2019
16:00

Cook Islands	0–1	Solomon Islands
	Report	Ledi 59'

CIFA Academy Field, Rarotonga
Attendance: 300
Referee: Lindsey Robinson (England)

=== Group B ===
Pos	Team	Pld	W	D	L	GF	GA	GD	Pts	Qualification
1	New Zealand	3	3	0	0	47	0	+47	9	Knockout stage
2	Tahiti	3	2	0	1	17	5	+12	6	Knockout stage
3	American Samoa	3	1	0	2	3	21	−18	3	
4	Samoa	3	0	0	3	2	43	−41	0	

Source: OFC
31 August 2019
13:00

New Zealand	30–0	Samoa
Brown 1', 10', 12' (pen.), 16', 49', 58', 61', 71', 85', 86'; Wasi 18', 45', 70'; Rennie 22', 36', 38'; Jenkins 37', 43', 53', 68', 80'; Wisnewski 56'; Abbott 65', 82'; Maynard 74', 76', 78', 88', 90+1'	Report

CIFA Academy Field, Rarotonga
Attendance: 250
Referee: Tapaita Lelenga (Tonga)
31 August 2019
16:00

Tahiti	7–0	American Samoa
Tamarii 11', 18', 27', 31'; Mose 15'; Tepea 25', 72'	Report

CIFA Academy Field, Rarotonga
Attendance: 250
Referee: Torika Delai (Fiji)

3 September 2019
13:00

Tahiti	0–5	New Zealand
	Report	Jenkins 7' (pen.); Brown 11', 15', 45', 70'

CIFA Academy Field, Rarotonga
Attendance: 350
Referee: Timothy Niu (Solomon Islands)
3 September 2019
16:00

American Samoa	3–2	Samoa
Tofaeono 25'; Lui 31', 42'	Report	Ruby 10', 80'

CIFA Academy Field, Rarotonga
Attendance: 180
Referee: Fina Angelo (Vanuatu)

6 September 2019
13:00

Samoa	0–10	Tahiti
	Report	Tufaunui 9'; Tamarii 19', 42'; Tepea 23', 36', 50', 75', 83', 90'; Mai 90'

CIFA Academy Field, Rarotonga
Attendance: 190
Referee: Fina Angelo (Vanuatu)
6 September 2019
16:00

American Samoa	0–12	New Zealand
	Report	Collins 3', 33', 43' (pen.), 56', 60'; Rennie 6', 45'; Wasi 17'; Kapisi 25' (o.g.); Herman-Watt 38'; Maynard 74'; Wilford Carroll 89'

CIFA Academy Field, Rarotonga
Attendance: 120
Referee: Tapaita Lelenga (Tonga)

=== Group C ===
Pos	Team	Pld	W	D	L	GF	GA	GD	Pts	Qualification
1	New Caledonia	2	2	0	0	12	2	+10	6	Knockout stage
2	Papua New Guinea	2	1	0	1	2	8	−6	3	
3	Tonga	2	0	0	2	2	6	−4	0	

Source: OFC
30 August 2019
10:00

Papua New Guinea	0–8	New Caledonia
	Report	Neporo 3', 29'; Cawa 16', 32'; Pahoa 55'; Gelima 79'; Boula 88'; Manas 90' (o.g.)

CIFA Academy Field, Rarotonga
Attendance: 250
Referee: Nadia Browning (New Zealand)

2 September 2019
10:00

New Caledonia	4–2	Tonga
Matao 45'; Cawa 49'; Boula 79', 81'	Report	Feke 6'; Polovili 86'

CIFA Academy Field, Rarotonga
Attendance: 200
Referee: Shama Maemae (Solomon Islands)

5 September 2019
10:00

Tonga	0–2	Papua New Guinea
	Report	Gossie 64'; Bekio 84'

CIFA Academy Field, Rarotonga
Attendance: 200
Referee: Nadia Browning (New Zealand)

=== Ranking of Second-placed teams ===
Results against the fourth-placed teams of each group C were not counted in determining the ranking of the third-placed teams.

Pos	Grp	Team	Pld	W	D	L	GF	GA	GD	Pts	Qualification
1	B	Tahiti	2	1	0	1	7	5	+2	3	Knockout stage
2	A	Fiji	2	1	0	1	1	1	0	3	
3	C	Papua New Guinea	2	1	0	1	2	8	−6	3	

Rules for classification: 1) points; 2) goal difference; 3) goals scored; 4) disciplinary points; 5) drawing of lots.

== Knockout stage ==
=== Bracket ===
Semi-finals
9 September – CIFA Academy
Tahiti	0 (6)
New Caledonia (p)	0 (7)
9 September – CIFA Academy
Vanuatu	0
New Zealand	11

Final
12 September – CIFA Academy
New Caledonia	2
New Zealand	5
Third place match
12 September – CIFA Academy
Tahiti	4
Vanuatu	1

=== Semi-finals ===
9 September 2019
12:30

Tahiti	0–0 (a.e.t.)	New Caledonia
	Report
Penalties
Tamarii (penalty scored); Tepea (penalty scored); Mai (penalty scored); Harry (penalty scored); Tihoni (penalty missed); Tekakioteragi (penalty scored); Hauata (penalty missed); Wong (penalty scored); Tetavahi (penalty missed)	6–7	(penalty scored) Matao; (penalty scored) Pahoa; (penalty missed) Sakilia; (penalty scored) Wahnapo; (penalty scored) Ufepi; (penalty scored) Cawa; (penalty missed) Iekawe; (penalty scored) Gelima; (penalty scored) Zasina

CIFA Academy Field, Rarotonga
Attendance: 400
Referee: Nadia Browning (New Zealand)

9 September 2019
16:00

Vanuatu	0–11	New Zealand
	Report	Brown 5', 9', 26', 57', 72'; Rennie 20'; Jenkins 38'; Collins 53'; Wisnewski 68', 89'; Wall 77'

CIFA Academy Field, Rarotonga
Attendance: 110
Referee: Rani Perry (Tahiti)

=== Third place match ===
12 September 2019
13:00

Tahiti	4–1	Vanuatu
Tepea 29'; Wong 52', 90'; Chu 57'	Report	Gere 87' (pen.)

CIFA Academy Field, Rarotonga
Attendance: 200
Referee: Shama Maemae (Solomon Islands)

=== Final ===
Winner qualified for 2021 FIFA U-20 Women's World Cup.

12 September 2019
16:00

New Caledonia	2–5	New Zealand
Cawa 45'; Pahoa 86'	Report	Rennie 17', 67'; Mittendorff 30'; Jenkins 72'; Brown 75'

CIFA Academy Field, Rarotonga
Attendance: 400
Referee: Fina Angelo (Vanuatu)

== Winners ==
2019 OFC U-19 Women's Championship

New Zealand
Seventh title

== Awards ==
The following awards were given at the conclusion of the tournament.

Award	Player
Golden Ball	(New Zealand) Grace Wisnewski
Golden Boot	(New Zealand) Kelli Brown
Golden Gloves	(French Polynesia) Corail Harry
Fair Play Award	Solomon Islands

== Goalscorers ==
There were 120 goals scored in 19 matches, for an average of 6.32 goals per match.

21 goals

- (New Zealand) Kelli Brown

9 goals

- (French Polynesia) Babou Tepea

8 goals

- (New Zealand) Maggie Jenkins
- (New Zealand) Gabi Rennie

6 goals

- (New Zealand) Ava Collins
- (New Zealand) Arabella Maynard
- (French Polynesia) Tahia Tamarii

4 goals

- (New Caledonia) Cassidy Cawa
- (New Zealand) Rene Wasi

3 goals

- (New Caledonia) Joana Boula
- (New Zealand) Grace Wisnewski

2 goals

- (American Samoa) Elcy Lui
- (Fiji) Asenaca Diranuve
- (New Caledonia) Jennifer Neporo
- (New Caledonia) Jackie Pahoa
- (New Zealand) Amelia Abbott
- (Samoa) Zoe Ruby
- (French Polynesia) Kiani Wong
- (Vanuatu) Bindy Erikan

1 goal

- (American Samoa) Oloa Tofaeono
- (Cook Islands) Ngamata Moekaa
- (Fiji) Koleta Likuculacula
- (Fiji) Laniana Qereqeretabua
- (New Caledonia) Ashley Gelima
- (New Caledonia) Edsy Matao
- (New Zealand) Tahlia Herman-Watt
- (New Zealand) Aneka Mittendorff
- (New Zealand) Lara Wall
- (New Zealand) Charlotte Wilford Carroll
- (Papua New Guinea) Nicole Bekio
- (Papua New Guinea) Asaiso Gossie
- (Solomon Islands) Jojo Ledi
- (Solomon Islands) Edith Nari
- (French Polynesia) Hereura Chu
- (French Polynesia) Kohai Mai
- (French Polynesia) Tetia Mose
- (French Polynesia) Vahuariki Tufaunui
- (Tonga) Lositika Feke
- (Tonga) Ana Polovili
- (Vanuatu) Annie Gere
- (Vanuatu) Celestine Kalopong
- (Vanuatu) Cynthia Ngwele
- (Vanuatu) Diana Sine

1 own goal

- (American Samoa) Destiny Kapisi (against New Zealand)
- (Papua New Guinea) Suan Manas (against New Caledonia)

== Qualified teams for FIFA U-20 Women's World Cup ==
The following team from OFC would have qualified for the 2021 FIFA U-20 Women's World Cup before the tournament was cancelled.

Team	Qualified on	Previous appearances in FIFA U-20 Women's World Cup^{1}
New Zealand	12 September 2019	7 (2006, 2008, 2010, 2012, 2014, 2016, 2018)

^{1} Bold indicates champions for that year. Italic indicates hosts for that year.
