= American Samoa women's national under-20 football team =

National youth association football team

American Samoa women's U-20
- Association: Football Federation American Samoa
- Confederation: OFC (Oceania)
- Head coach: Steve Settle
- Top scorer: Elcy Lui (2)
- Home stadium: Veterans Memorial Stadium
- FIFA code: ASA
First colors	Second colors

First international
- American Samoa 0–0 Fiji (Nuku'alofa, Tonga; 23 April 2002)

Biggest win
- American Samoa 3–2 Samoa (Matavera, Cook Islands; 3 September 2019)

Biggest defeat
- Tonga 16–0 American Samoa (‘Atele, Tonga; 13 March 2025)

World Cup
- Appearances: 0

OFC U-20 Women's Championship
- Appearances: 3 (first in 2002)
- Best result: Fourth place (2010)

The American Samoa women's national under-20 football team is the highest women's youth team of women's football in American Samoa and is controlled by the Football Federation American Samoa (FFAS).

== History ==
American Samoa is known as one of the worst football teams in the world. In that perspective their debut at the OFC U-20 Women's Championship was quite good. They made their debut in 2002 at the first tournament ever held. They managed to draw two times with only one loss: just 2–0 against giants New Zealand. The team managed to score two goals in their 2–2 draw against Samoa. They ended up 3 out of 4 in the group, above Fiji.

Eight years later, in 2010, the team struggled a whole lot more. They lost all their three games: two 4-0 defeats against Tonga and the Cook Islands and an 8–0 defeat against New Zealand.

After two tournaments the American Samoa team has never won and just scored two goals. However they will participate again in 2019.

== OFC Championship Record ==
OFC U-20 Women's Championship
Year	Round	Pld	W	D	L	GF	GA	GD
(Tonga) 2002	Group stage	3	0	2	1	2	4	-2
(Papua New Guinea) 2004	Did not Participate							
(Samoa) 2006	Did not Participate							
(New Zealand) 2010	Fourth Place	3	0	0	3	0	16	-16
(New Zealand) 2012	Did not Participate							
(New Zealand) 2014	Did not Participate							
(Tonga) 2015	Did not Participate							
(New Zealand) 2017	Did not Participate							
(Cook Islands) 2019	Group stage	3	1	0	2	3	21	-18
(Fiji) 2023	Did not Participate							
Total	3/10	9	1	2	6	5	41	-36

== Current squad ==
The following players were called up for the 2019 OFC U-19 Women's Championship from 30 August – 12 September in Avarua, Cook Islands.

Caps and goals updated as of 7 September 2019, after the game against New Zealand.

No.	Pos.	Player	Date of birth (age)	Caps	Goals	Club
1	GK	Malia Iolama	December 13, 2000 (age 25)	0	0	(Football Federation American Samoa) Ilaoa and To'omata
23	GK	Destiny Kapisi	December 30, 2002 (age 23)	3	0	(Football Federation American Samoa) Lion Heart
2	DF	Olivia Vaiomounga	February 12, 2001 (age 25)	3	0	(Football Federation American Samoa) Pago Youth
3	DF	Susanna Lutali	August 17, 2003 (age 23)	3	0	(Football Federation American Samoa) Pago Youth
4	DF	Veronica Iupati	August 25, 2003 (age 23)	3	0	(Football Federation American Samoa) Ilaoa and To'omata
5	DF	Tatiana Jackson	July 13, 2002 (age 24)	1	0	(Football Federation American Samoa) Lion Heart
15	DF	Pisita Lui	September 29, 2004 (age 22)	0	0	(Football Federation American Samoa) Lion Heart
17	DF	Grace Malaefono	April 5, 2004 (age 22)	2	0	(Football Federation American Samoa) Utulei Youth
18	DF	Latoya Lei	August 16, 2001 (age 25)	1	0	(Football Federation American Samoa) Tafuna Jets
6	MF	Aileen Ieremia	July 12, 2001 (age 25)	3	0	(Football Federation American Samoa) Lion Heart
8	MF	Precious Ieremia	September 11, 2003 (age 23)	3	0	(Football Federation American Samoa) Green Bay
9	MF	Elcy Lui	June 19, 2002 (age 24)	3	2	(Football Federation American Samoa) Lion Heart
10	MF	Eseta Enesi	October 26, 2002 (age 23)	3	0	(Football Federation American Samoa) Pago Youth
11	MF	Agnes Siaosi	November 27, 2002 (age 23)	1	0	(Football Federation American Samoa) Lion Heart
12	MF	Ama Faleao	February 28, 2003 (age 23)	3	0	(Football Federation American Samoa) Ilaoa and To'omata
14	MF	Eliza Berondo	April 18, 2002 (age 24)	2	0	(Football Federation American Samoa) PanSa East
7	FW	Aggie Pati	November 19, 2003 (age 22)	3	0	(Football Federation American Samoa) Black Roses
13	FW	Oloa Tofaeono	November 17, 2002 (age 23)	3	1	(Football Federation American Samoa) Lion Heart
16	FW	Precious Faamoana	January 15, 2003 (age 23)	0	0	(Football Federation American Samoa) Vaiala Tongan
