= Cook Islands women's national under-20 football team =

Cook Islands women's U-20
- Association: Cook Islands Football Association
- Confederation: OFC (Oceania)
- Head coach: (Netherlands) Judith Kuipers
- Top scorer: Regina Mustonen (5)
- Home stadium: Avarua Tereora Stadium
- FIFA code: COK
First colours	Second colours

First international
- Cook Islands 0–15 Australia (Nuku'alofa, Tonga; April 26, 2002)

Biggest win
- American Samoa 0–4 Cook Islands (Auckland, New Zealand; January 25, 2010)

Biggest defeat
- Cook Islands 0–15 Australia (Nuku'alofa, Tonga; April 26, 2002)

World Cup
- Appearances: 0

OFC U-20 Women's Championship
- Appearances: 4 (first in 2002)
- Best result: Second Place (2010)

The Cook Islands women's national under-20 football team is the highest women's youth team of women's football in the Cook Islands and is controlled by the Cook Islands Football Association (CIFA).

== History ==
The Cook Islands is with approximately 18.000 inhabitants one of the smallest nations in the world. Despite being such a small country they are quite good at the Women's football tournaments. Their under-20 team participated just twice at OFC U-20 Women's Championship so far. At the first ever edition of the tournament, in 2002, they managed to get a draw in their second game of the tournament: 1–1 against Tonga. The first game they ever played, a 15–0 loss against Australia, is still their biggest loss ever.

Eight years later, in 2010, they performed a lot better with grabbing their first victory ever: a 4–0 victory against American Samoa. After again 1–1 draw against Tonga and a 8–0 defeat against New Zealand they reached the second place, out of four teams. Notably was that all their five goals in this tournament were scored by Regina Mustonen which made her automatically the all-time top scorer of the Cook Islands Women's U-20.

In 2019 they will participate again.

== OFC Championship Record ==
OFC U-20 Women's Championship
Year	Round	Pld	W	D	L	GF	GA	GD
(Tonga) 2002	Group stage	2	0	1	1	1	16	-15
(Papua New Guinea) 2004	Did not Participate							
(Samoa) 2006	Did not Participate							
(New Zealand) 2010	Second Place	3	1	1	1	5	9	-4
(New Zealand) 2012	Did not Participate							
(New Zealand) 2014	Did not Participate							
(Tonga) 2015	Did not Participate							
(New Zealand) 2017	Did not Participate							
(Cook Islands) 2019	Group stage	3	1	0	2	1	2	-1
(Fiji) 2023	Fourth place	5	2	1	2	4	8	-4
Total	4/10	13	4	3	6	11	35	-24

== Current squad ==
The following players were called up for the 2019 OFC U-19 Women's Championship from 30 August–12 September in Avarua, the Cook Islands.

Caps and goals updated as of 6 September 2019, after the game against the Solomon Islands.

No.	Pos.	Player	Date of birth (age)	Caps	Goals	Club
1	GK	Daimzel Rongokea	29 July 2001 (age 25)	3	0	(Cook Islands Football Association) Puaikura
20	GK	Alma Ngametua	19 January 2003 (age 23)	0	0	(Cook Islands Football Association) Avatiu
2	DF	Merran Munro	22 August 2002 (age 24)	2	0	(Cook Islands Football Association) Puaikura
3	DF	Teretia Teinaki	23 January 2002 (age 24)	3	0	(Cook Islands Football Association) Tupapa Maraerenga
4	DF	Esther Potoru	26 May 2002 (age 24)	3	0	(Cook Islands Football Association) Puaikura
5	DF	Tiamarama Tuivaga	26 June 2001 (age 25)	0	0	(Cook Islands Football Association) Nikao Sokattack
13	DF	Tarita Mamanu	9 August 2001 (age 25)	1	0	(Cook Islands Football Association) Puaikura
14	DF	Eitiare Tangirere	8 September 2001 (age 25)	2	0	(Cook Islands Football Association) Titikaveka
17	DF	Tepaeru Ngaroi	9 August 2003 (age 23)	2	0	(Cook Islands Football Association) Avatiu
18	DF	Tineke De Jong	26 May 2002 (age 24)	0	0	(Cook Islands Football Association) Titikaveka
6	MF	Tehinnah Tatuava (captain)	15 April 2002 (age 24)	3	0	(Cook Islands Football Association) Titikaveka
7	MF	Piri Murare	16 August 2001 (age 25)	3	0	(Cook Islands Football Association) Avatiu
8	MF	Jessica Warmington	8 June 2001 (age 25)	3	0	(New Zealand Football) Papatoetoe
10	MF	Ngametua Taringa	3 February 2002 (age 24)	3	0	(Cook Islands Football Association) Tupapa Maraerenga
15	MF	Lyric Davison	11 April 2002 (age 24)	3	0	(New Zealand Football) Ellerslie
16	MF	Keana Maaka	10 October 2002 (age 24)	0	0	(Cook Islands Football Association) Avatiu
9	FW	Kuramaeva Mose	26 June 2004 (age 22)	3	0	(Cook Islands Football Association) Tupapa Maraerenga
11	FW	Moeroa Harmon	8 July 2000 (age 26)	3	0	(Cook Islands Football Association) Tupapa Maraerenga
12	FW	Ngamata Moekaa	24 May 2002 (age 24)	3	1	(Cook Islands Football Association) Puaikura
