= 2025 OFC U-19 Women's Championship qualification =

Tournament details
- Host country: Tonga
- Dates: 7–13 March 2025
- Teams: 3 (from 1 confederation)
- Venue(s): 1 (in 1 host city)

Tournament statistics
- Matches played: 3
- Goals scored: 24 (8 per match)

The qualification tournament for the 2025 OFC U-19 Women's Championship was held from 7 to 13 March 2025. The tournament was hosted by Tonga.

== Group stage ==
The draw for the group stage was held on 21 January 2025. The group winner will advance to the final tournament.

=== Standings ===
Pos	Team	Pld	W	D	L	GF	GA	GD	Pts	Qualification
1	Tonga (H)	2	2	0	0	17	0	+17	6	Qualify for Final tournament
2	Solomon Islands	2	1	0	1	7	1	+6	3	
3	American Samoa	2	0	0	2	0	23	−23	0	

Source: OFC
(H) Hosts
7 March 2025
14:00

Solomon Islands	0–1	Tonga
	Report	C. Filimoeatu 69'

Loto-Tonga Soka Centre, ‘Atele, Tonga
Attendance: 300

10 March 2025
14:00

Solomon Islands	7–0	American Samoa
	Report

Loto-Tonga Soka Centre, ‘Atele, Tonga

13 March 2025
14:00

Tonga	16–0	American Samoa
G. Filimoeatu 6'; Faletau 10', 19', 26', 30', 56', 64'; Malohifo'ou 17', 45', 86'; Makaafi 29'; C. Filimoeatu 45'; Pongi 62', 80'; Mavaega 70' (o.g.); Sime 71'	Report

Loto-Tonga Soka Centre, ‘Atele, Tonga
Attendance: 451
