= Vanuatu women's national under-20 football team =

Vanuatu Women's U-20
- Association: Vanuatu Football Federation
- Confederation: OFC (Oceania)
- Head coach: Benson Rarua
- Top scorer: Monica Melteviel (4)
- Home stadium: Luganville Soccer City Stadium
- FIFA code: VAN
First colours	Second colours

FIFA ranking
- Current: 148 ▼6
- Highest: 142 (Augustus 2015)

First international
- Tonga 4–1 Vanuatu (Apia, Samoa; March 31, 2006)

Biggest win
- Vanuatu 4–0 New Caledonia (‘Atele, Tonga; October 1, 2015); Vanuatu 4–0 Solomon Islands (Matavera, Cook Islands; September 2, 2019)

Biggest defeat
- New Zealand 18–0 Vanuatu (‘Atele, Tonga; October 5, 2015)

World Cup
- Appearances: 0

OFC U-20 Women's Championship
- Appearances: 5 (first in 2006)
- Best result: Third place (2015)

The Vanuatu women's national under-20 football team is the highest women's youth team of women's football in Vanuatu and is controlled by the Vanuatu Football Federation.

== OFC Championship Record ==
OFC U-20 Women's Championship
Year	Round	Pld	W	D	L	GF	GA	GD
(Tonga) 2002	Did not Participate							
(Papua New Guinea) 2004	Did not Participate							
(Samoa) 2006	Group stage	3	0	1	2	2	16	-14
(New Zealand) 2010	Did not Participate							
(New Zealand) 2012	Did not Participate							
(New Zealand) 2014	4th Place	3	0	0	3	0	20	-20
(Tonga) 2015	3rd Place	4	1	2	1	9	23	-14
(New Zealand) 2017	Did not Participate							
(Cook Islands) 2019	4th Place	5	2	0	3	6	16	-10
(Fiji) 2023	Quarter-finals	4	1	0	3	9	9	0
Total	5/10	19	4	3	12	26	84	-58

== Current squad ==
The following players were called up for the 2019 OFC U-19 Women's Championship from 30 August–12 September in Avarua, the Cook Islands.

Caps and goals updated as of 6 September 2019, after the game against Fiji.

No.	Pos.	Player	Date of birth (age)	Caps	Goals	Club
1	GK	Karine Manvoi	1 June 2003 (age 22)	1	0	(Vanuatu Football Federation)
2		Melanie Timatua	16 July 2000 (age 25)	2	0	(Vanuatu Football Federation)
7	MF	Rita Solomon (captain)	29 March 2001 (age 24)	3	0	(Vanuatu Football Federation) Erakor Golden Star
8		Bindy Erickan	30 July 2001 (age 24)	3	2	(Vanuatu Football Federation) Erakor Golden Star
9	FW	Cynthia Ngwele	21 September 2001 (age 24)	3	1	(Vanuatu Football Federation)
10	MF	Annie Rose Gere	31 January 2001 (age 25)	3	0	(Vanuatu Football Federation)
11	MF	Celestine Kalopong	30 May 2002 (age 23)	3	1	(Vanuatu Football Federation) Erakor Golden Star
12	MF	Nettie Kalsau	20 February 2001 (age 25)	3	0	(Vanuatu Football Federation)
13		Daina Sine	2 May 2001 (age 24)	3	1	(Vanuatu Football Federation)
14		Evana Tinwako	6 January 2002 (age 24)	3	0	(Vanuatu Football Federation)
15		Noeline Erickan	24 December 2001 (age 24)	2	0	(Vanuatu Football Federation) Erakor Golden Star
17		Limas Erickan	29 January 2002 (age 24)	3	0	(Vanuatu Football Federation) Erakor Golden Star
20		Carlie Tari	3 July 2002 (age 23)	2	0	(Vanuatu Football Federation)
21	GK	Rose Simon	12 April 2001 (age 24)	3	0	(Vanuatu Football Federation)
	GK	Cloe Tate	6 June 2000 (age 25)	0	0	(Vanuatu Football Federation)
	GK	Amelia Retty	8 March 2002 (age 24)	0	0	(Vanuatu Football Federation)
		Selena Poida	21 March 2002 (age 23)	0	0	(Vanuatu Football Federation)
		Vaina Alphonse	31 December 2002 (age 23)	0	0	(Vanuatu Football Federation)
		Anais Kalopong	20 January 2001 (age 25)	0	0	(Vanuatu Football Federation) Erakor Golden Star
		Dannie Wanemut		0	0	(Vanuatu Football Federation)
		Tiffany Sope		0	0	(Vanuatu Football Federation)
		Matilda Kalkau		0	0	(Vanuatu Football Federation)
		Suzanne Nawen		0	0	(Vanuatu Football Federation)
		Emma Wanemut		0	0	(Vanuatu Football Federation)
