= 2017 OFC U-19 Women's Championship =

Tournament details
- Host country: New Zealand
- City: Auckland
- Dates: 11–24 July 2017
- Teams: 6 (from 1 confederation)
- Venue: 1 (in 1 host city)

Final positions
- Champions: New Zealand (6th title)
- Runners-up: Fiji
- Third place: Papua New Guinea
- Fourth place: New Caledonia

Tournament statistics
- Matches played: 15
- Goals scored: 86 (5.73 per match)
- Attendance: 2,200 (147 per match)
- Top scorer: (New Zealand) Emma Main (11 goals)
- Best player: (Fiji) Luisa Tamanitoakula
- Best goalkeeper: (Fiji) Ateca Tuwa
- Fair play award: New Zealand

The 2017 OFC U-19 Women's Championship was the 8th edition of the OFC U-19/U-20 Women's Championship, the biennial international youth football championship organised by the Oceania Football Confederation (OFC) for the women's under-19/under-20 national teams of Oceania. The tournament was held in New Zealand between 11–24 July 2017.

For this tournament the age limit was lowered from under-20 to under-19. The winners of the tournament qualified for the 2018 FIFA U-20 Women's World Cup in France as the OFC representative.

== Teams ==
A total of six (out of 11) OFC member national teams entered the tournament.

Team	Appearance	Previous best performance
Fiji	3rd	Group stage (2002, 2006)
New Caledonia	4th	Third place (2012)
New Zealand (hosts)	7th	Champions (2006, 2010, 2012, 2014, 2015)
Papua New Guinea	5th	Runners-up (2004, 2012, 2014)
Samoa	5th	Fourth place (2002, 2006, 2012)
Tonga	6th	Runners-up (2006)

Did not enter

- American Samoa
- Cook Islands
- Solomon Islands
- Tahiti
- Vanuatu

== Venue ==
The matches were played at the Ngahue Reserve in Auckland.

== Squads ==
Players born on or after 1 January 1998 were eligible to compete in the tournament. Each team could name a maximum of 20 players.

== Matches ==
The tournament was played in round-robin format. There were three matches on each matchday. The draw for the fixtures was held on 31 May 2017 at the OFC Headquarters in Auckland, New Zealand.

All times were local, NZST (UTC+12).

Pos	Team	Pld	W	D	L	GF	GA	GD	Pts	Qualification
1	New Zealand (H)	5	5	0	0	48	1	+47	15	2018 FIFA U-20 Women's World Cup
2	Fiji	5	3	1	1	12	14	−2	10	
3	Papua New Guinea	5	2	1	2	14	17	−3	7	
4	New Caledonia	5	2	0	3	5	22	−17	6	
5	Samoa	5	0	3	2	4	11	−7	3	
6	Tonga	5	0	1	4	3	21	−18	1	

Source: OFC
(H) Hosts
11 July 2017
10:00

New Zealand	12–0	Papua New Guinea
Blake 16', 45+4', 87', 89'; Tawharu 30', 90+5' (pen.); Hand 45+1'; Stevens 52', 69', 75'; Main 54', 67'	Report

Ngahue Reserve (Field 2), Auckland
Attendance: 200
Referee: Tapaita Lelenga (Tonga)
11 July 2017
12:30

Tonga	0–4	Fiji
	Report	Nasau 30' (pen.), 65'; Tamanitoakula 45+1', 56' (pen.)

Ngahue Reserve (Field 2), Auckland
Attendance: 150
Referee: Rani Perry (Tahiti)
11 July 2017
15:00

New Caledonia	1–0	Samoa
Wenessia 53'	Report

Ngahue Reserve (Field 2), Auckland
Attendance: 100
Referee: Nadia Browning (New Zealand)

14 July 2017
10:00

Fiji	1–9	New Zealand
Nasau 65'	Report	Blake 5', 56'; Stevens 7', 83'; Hand 13'; Foster 20'; Main 40'; Tawharu 70', 72'

Ngahue Reserve (Field 2), Auckland
Attendance: 150
Referee: Tapaita Lelenga (Tonga)
14 July 2017
12:30

Papua New Guinea	7–0	New Caledonia
Maiyosi 30', 88'; Ageva 44', 60', 66', 70'; Padio 49'	Report

Ngahue Reserve (Field 2), Auckland
Attendance: 100
Referee: Morgan Archer (New Zealand)
14 July 2017
15:00

Samoa	1–1	Tonga
Talasinga 34' (o.g.)	Report	Lutu 88'

Ngahue Reserve (Field 2), Auckland
Attendance: 100
Referee: Torika Delai (Fiji)

17 July 2017
10:00

Papua New Guinea	4–1	Tonga
Unamba 26'; Padio 40', 51'; Ageva 88'	Report	Kafa 7'

Ngahue Reserve (Field 2), Auckland
Attendance: 150
Referee: Nadia Browning (New Zealand)
17 July 2017
12:30

New Caledonia	0–12	New Zealand
	Report	Tawharu 14', 45', 88'; Mettam 15'; Jackson 20', 42'; Main 22', 25', 55'; Stevens 50'; Foster 80'; Jale 83'

Ngahue Reserve (Field 2), Auckland
Attendance: 150
Referee: Rani Perry (Tahiti)
17 July 2017
15:00

Samoa	2–2	Fiji
Malaki 61'; Fiso 63'	Report	Nasau 54'; Tamanitoakula 90+1'

Ngahue Reserve (Field 2), Auckland
Attendance: 100
Referee: Morgan Archer (New Zealand)

21 July 2017
10:00

New Zealand	6–0	Samoa
Tawharu 21', 70'; Jale 30'; Ah Ki 56' (o.g.); Main 67'; Blake 82'	Report

Ngahue Reserve (Field 2), Auckland
Attendance: 200
Referee: Torika Delai (Fiji)
21 July 2017
12:30

Tonga	1–3	New Caledonia
Kafa 28'	Report	Wenessia 10'; Forest 12'; Palene 21'

Ngahue Reserve (Field 2), Auckland
Attendance: 100
Referee: Morgan Archer (New Zealand)
21 July 2017
15:00

Fiji	3–2	Papua New Guinea
Tamanitoakula 36', 55'; Diranuve 66'	Report	Ageva 56'; Maiyosi 64'

Ngahue Reserve (Field 2), Auckland
Attendance: 100
Referee: Tapaita Lelenga (Tonga)

24 July 2017
10:00

Tonga	0–9	New Zealand
	Report	Blake 9'; Main 13', 19', 20', 37'; Jackson 77'; Foster 84'; Jale 89'; Tahitua 90+1' (o.g.)

Ngahue Reserve (Field 2), Auckland
Attendance: 250
Referee: Rani Perry (Tahiti)
24 July 2017
12:30

Fiji	2–1	New Caledonia
Tamanitoakula 35', 39'	Report	Hnaweongo 55'

Ngahue Reserve (Field 2), Auckland
Attendance: 100
Referee: Nadia Browning (New Zealand)
24 July 2017
15:00

Samoa	1–1	Papua New Guinea
Malaki 45'	Report	Ageva 41'

Ngahue Reserve (Field 2), Auckland
Attendance: 250
Referee: Morgan Archer (New Zealand)

== Winners ==
2017 OFC U-19 Women's Championship

**New Zealand**
**Sixth title**

The following team from OFC qualified for the 2018 FIFA U-20 Women's World Cup.

Team	Qualified on	Previous appearances in FIFA U-20 Women's World Cup^{1}
New Zealand	21 July 2017	6 (2006, 2008, 2010, 2012, 2014, 2016)

^{1} Bold indicates champions for that year. Italic indicates hosts for that year.

== Awards ==
The following awards were given at the conclusion of the tournament.

Award	Player
Golden Ball	(Fiji) Luisa Tamanitoakula
Golden Boot	(New Zealand) Emma Main
Golden Gloves	(Fiji) Ateca Tuwa
Fair Play Award	New Zealand

== Goalscorers ==
11 goals

- (New Zealand) Emma Main

9 goals

- (New Zealand) Samantha Tawharu

8 goals

- (New Zealand) Hannah Blake

7 goals

- (Fiji) Luisa Tamanitoakula
- (Papua New Guinea) Nicollete Ageva

6 goals

- (New Zealand) Dayna Stevens

4 goals

- (Fiji) Cema Nasau

3 goals

- (New Zealand) Michaela Foster
- (New Zealand) Deven Jackson
- (New Zealand) Grace Jale
- (Papua New Guinea) Jacklyn Maiyosi
- (Papua New Guinea) Ramona Padio

2 goals

- (New Caledonia) Alice Wenessia
- (New Zealand) Jacqui Hand
- (Samoa) Hunter Malaki
- (Tonga) Mele Kafa

1 goal

- (Fiji) Asenaca Diranuve
- (New Caledonia) Oceane Forest
- (New Caledonia) Isabelle Hnaweongo
- (New Caledonia) Marie-Laure Palene
- (New Zealand) Nicole Mettam
- (Papua New Guinea) Selina Unamba
- (Samoa) Shalom Fiso
- (Tonga) Seini Lutu

1 own goal

- (Samoa) Mariecamilla Ah Ki (playing against New Zealand)
- (Tonga) Helen Tahitua (playing against New Zealand)
- (Tonga) Nipa Talasinga (playing against Samoa)
