= 2015 OFC U-20 Women's Championship =

Tournament details
- Host country: Tonga
- City: Nuku'alofa
- Dates: 1–10 October 2015
- Teams: 5 (from 1 confederation)
- Venue: 1 (in 1 host city)

Final positions
- Champions: New Zealand (5th title)
- Runners-up: Samoa
- Third place: Vanuatu
- Fourth place: New Caledonia

Tournament statistics
- Matches played: 10
- Goals scored: 102 (10.2 per match)
- Top scorer: (New Zealand) Emma Rolston (25 goals)
- Best player: (New Zealand) Jasmine Pereira
- Best goalkeeper: (Samoa) Katarina Ah Sui
- Fair play award: Tonga

The 2015 OFC U-20 Women's Championship was the 7th edition of the OFC U-20 Women's Championship, the biennial international youth football championship organised by the Oceania Football Confederation (OFC) for the women's under-20 national teams of Oceania. The tournament was held in Tonga between 1–10 October 2015. The tournament was originally scheduled to be held between 16–30 January 2016.

Same as previous editions, the tournament acted as the OFC qualifiers for the FIFA U-20 Women's World Cup. The winner of the tournament qualified for the 2016 FIFA U-20 Women's World Cup in Papua New Guinea as the OFC representative, besides Papua New Guinea who qualified automatically as hosts.

New Zealand were confirmed as champions for the fifth consecutive time on 8 October 2015, sealing their qualification to the World Cup.

== Teams ==
A total of five OFC member national teams entered the tournament.

Team	Appearance	Previous best performance
New Caledonia	3rd	Third place (2012)
New Zealand	6th	Champions (2006, 2010, 2012, 2014)
Samoa	4th	Fourth place (2002, 2006, 2012)
Tonga (hosts)	5th	Runners-up (2006)
Vanuatu	3rd	Fourth place (2012)

Did not enter

- American Samoa
- Cook Islands
- Fiji
- Papua New Guinea
- Solomon Islands
- Tahiti

== Venue ==
The matches were played at the Loto-Tonga Soka Centre in Nuku'alofa.

== Squads ==
Players born on or after 1 January 1996 were eligible to compete in the tournament.

== Matches ==
The tournament was played in round-robin format. There were two matches on each matchday, with one team having a bye. The draw for the fixtures was held on 2 September 2015 at the OFC Headquarters in Auckland, New Zealand.

All times were local, TOT (UTC+13).

Pos	Team	Pld	W	D	L	GF	GA	GD	Pts	Qualification
1	New Zealand	4	4	0	0	69	0	+69	12	2016 FIFA U-20 Women's World Cup
2	Samoa	4	1	2	1	12	18	−6	5	
3	Vanuatu	4	1	2	1	9	23	−14	5	
4	New Caledonia	4	1	0	3	5	38	−33	3	
5	Tonga (H)	4	0	2	2	7	23	−16	2	

Source: OFC
(H) Hosts
1 October 2015
13:00

Tonga	0–15	New Zealand
	Report	Rolston 19', 48', 69'; Pereira 30', 45+1', 64'; Coombes 32', 34', 44'; Cleverley 41', 75', 90+1'; Robertson 62'; Jale 78', 82'

Loto-Tonga Soka Centre, Nuku'alofa
Referee: George Time (Solomon Islands)
1 October 2015
15:30

Vanuatu	4–0	New Caledonia
Melteviel 53'; Batick 72'; Anis 77'; Senis 89'	Report

Loto-Tonga Soka Centre, Nuku'alofa
Referee: Salesh Chand (Fiji)

3 October 2015
13:00

New Zealand	26–0	New Caledonia
Rolston 2', 3', 5', 11', 14'; 20' (pen.), 22', 27', 28', 32', 45+6'; Satchell 8', 25', 49'; Pereira 15', 37', 50', 77', 82', 90+3'; Jale 34', 38', 64'; Parris 56'; Robertson 72'; Richards 79'	Report

Loto-Tonga Soka Centre, Nuku'alofa
Referee: Finau Vulivuli (Fiji)
3 October 2015
15:30

Tonga	3–3	Samoa
Tongia 39', 56', 90+2'	Report	Mad. Ah Ki 60'; Faasavalu 75'; Daniells 87'

Loto-Tonga Soka Centre, Nuku'alofa
Referee: Amos Anio (Papua New Guinea)

5 October 2015
13:00

New Caledonia	2–6	Samoa
Tchacko 12'; Oniary 82'	Report	Moaata 5'; Fiso 8', 23', 51'; Daniells 40'; Nielsen 76'

Loto-Tonga Soka Centre, Nuku'alofa
Referee: George Time (Solomon Islands)
5 October 2015
15:30

New Zealand	18–0	Vanuatu
Pereira 5', 15', 18', 22', 63', 77'; Rolston 8', 10', 40', 43'; 57', 65', 81', 82', 84'; Robertson 13', 45'; Cleverley 26'	Report

Loto-Tonga Soka Centre, Nuku'alofa
Referee: Finau Vulivuli (Fiji)

8 October 2015
13:00

Samoa	3–3	Vanuatu
Daniells 48', 90+6'; Mad. Ah Ki 54'	Report	Melteviel 6', 66'; Charley 22'

Loto-Tonga Soka Centre, Nuku'alofa
Referee: Salesh Chand (Fiji)
8 October 2015
15:30

New Caledonia	3–2	Tonga
Nyipie 24'; Tchacko 64'; I. Hace 83'	Report	Laakulu 67', 89'

Loto-Tonga Soka Centre, Nuku'alofa
Referee: Amos Anio (Papua New Guinea)

10 October 2015
13:00

Vanuatu	2–2	Tonga
Charley 23'; Melteviel 89'	Report	Laakulu 79'; Akolo 86'

Loto-Tonga Soka Centre, Nuku'alofa
Referee: Finau Vulivuli (Fiji)
10 October 2015
15:30

Samoa	0–10	New Zealand
	Report	Cleverley 18'; Rolston 40', 45+1'; Pereira 46'; Coombes 53'; Main 55', 58', 58', 74'; Robertson 80'

Loto-Tonga Soka Centre, Nuku'alofa
Referee: George Time (Solomon Islands)

== Winners ==
2015 OFC U-20 Women's Championship

**New Zealand**
**Fifth title**

New Zealand qualified for the FIFA U-20 Women's World Cup for the sixth consecutive time. With hosts Papua New Guinea also participating, this is the first tournament to feature two teams from OFC.

Team	Qualified on	Previous appearances in tournament^{1}
Papua New Guinea	20 March 2015	0 (Debut)
New Zealand	8 October 2015	5 (2006, 2008, 2010, 2012, 2014)

^{1} Bold indicates champion for that year. Italic indicates host for that year.

== Awards ==
The following awards were given at the conclusion of the tournament.

Award	Player
Golden Ball	(New Zealand) Jasmine Pereira
Golden Boot	(New Zealand) Emma Rolston
Golden Gloves	(Samoa) Katarina Ah Sui
Fair Play Award	Tonga

== Goalscorers ==
25 goals

- (New Zealand) Emma Rolston

16 goals

- (New Zealand) Jasmine Pereira

5 goals

- (New Zealand) Daisy Cleverley
- (New Zealand) Grace Jale
- (New Zealand) Michaela Robertson

4 goals

- (New Zealand) Isabella Coombes
- (New Zealand) Emma Main
- (Samoa) Matalena Daniells
- (Vanuatu) Monica Melteviel

3 goals

- (New Zealand) Paige Satchell
- (Samoa) Shalom Fiso
- (Tonga) Ofaloto Laakulu
- (Tonga) Malia Tongia

2 goals

- (New Caledonia) Marie-Luce Tchacko
- (Samoa) Madeleen Ah Ki
- (Vanuatu) Priscilla Charley

1 goal

- (New Caledonia) Isabelle Hace
- (New Caledonia) Lyndsay Nyipie
- (New Caledonia) Marlory Oniary
- (New Zealand) Jade Parris
- (New Zealand) Isabella Richards
- (Samoa) Matalena Faasavalu
- (Samoa) Vaaipu Moaata
- (Samoa) Marcella Nielsen
- (Tonga) Mele Akolo
- (Vanuatu) Brenda Anis
- (Vanuatu) Rina Batick
- (Vanuatu) Clemontine Senis
