= Matalena Daniells =

Samoan association football player

Matalena Daniells Johnson (born 16 August 1996) is a footballer who plays as a midfielder. Born in Australia, she has captained the Samoa women's national team. She is the sister of Samoan men's footballer Kevin Daniells.

Johnson was born in Innisfail, Queensland in Australia and was educated at the University of Queensland, graduating with a Bachelor of Health, Sport and Physical Education. She works as a schoolteacher in Brisbane, Australia. In 2020 she was a finalist for a Queensland TEACHX award.

In 2011 she played for Innisfail United. In August 2013 she was awarded a Pierre de Coubertin Award. In 2016 she played for Olympic FC. In 2018 she played for Moreton Bay United FC. In 2021 she played for Olympic FC and was nominated for Queensland Women's Player of the Year.

In 2015 she captained the Samoa women's national under-20 football team in the 2015 OFC U-20 Women's Championship. In 2018 she was selected for the Samoan Women's team to compete at the OFC Women's Nations Cup, and was appointed vice-captain. In June 2019 she captained the squad for the 2019 Pacific Games, which won a silver medal.
