= Solomon Islands women's national under-20 football team =

National association football team

Solomon Islands women's U-20
- Association: Solomon Islands Football Federation
- Confederation: OFC (Oceania)
- Head coach: (Solomon Islands) Patrick Miniti
- Top scorer: Laydah Samani, Vanessa Inifiri & Edith Nari (1)
- Home stadium: Lawson Tama Stadium
- FIFA code: SOL
| First colours | Second colours |

First international
- Papua New Guinea 0–0 Solomon Islands (Port Moresby, Papua New Guinea; 20 April 2004)

Biggest defeat
- New Zealand 19–0 Solomon Islands (Suva, Fiji; 2 July 2023)

World Cup
- Appearances: 0

OFC U-20 Women's Championship
- Appearances: 4 (first in 2004)
- Best result: Third Place (2004)

The Solomon Islands women's national under-20 football team is the highest women's youth team of women's football in the Solomon Islands and is controlled by the Solomon Islands Football Federation (SIFF).

== History ==
The Solomon Islands is known as one of the best footballing countries in the Pacific. However, that counts for the men's. The women's are still far behind. The Women's under-20 team participated just two times so far at the OFC U-20 Women's Championship: in 2004 and 2006. In both of these tournament they managed to get a draw: a 0–0 against Papua New Guinea and a 1–1 against Melanesian rivals Vanuatu. They suffered there biggest loss in 2004: a 13–0 loss against Australia. So far the Solomon Islands under-20 team has never won a single game. However, in 2019 they will get a new chance as they will participate again.

== OFC Championship Record ==
OFC U-20 Women's Championship
| Year | Round | Pld | W | D | L | GF | GA | GD |
|---|---|---|---|---|---|---|---|---|
| (Tonga) 2002 | Did not Participate | | | | | | | |
| (Papua New Guinea) 2004 | Third Place | 2 | 0 | 1 | 1 | 0 | 13 | -13 |
| (Samoa) 2006 | Group stage | 3 | 0 | 1 | 2 | 2 | 7 | -5 |
| (New Zealand) 2010 | Did not Participate | | | | | | | |
| (New Zealand) 2012 | Did not Participate | | | | | | | |
| (New Zealand) 2014 | Did not Participate | | | | | | | |
| (Tonga) 2015 | Did not Participate | | | | | | | |
| (New Zealand) 2017 | Did not Participate | | | | | | | |
| (Cook Islands) 2019 | Group stage | 3 | 1 | 0 | 2 | 2 | 7 | -5 |
| (Fiji) 2023 | Quarter-finals | 3 | 1 | 0 | 2 | 1 | 20 | -19 |
| Total | 4/10 | 11 | 2 | 2 | 7 | 5 | 40 | -35 |

== Current squad ==
The following players were called up for the 2019 OFC U-19 Women's Championship from 30 August–12 September in Avarua, the Cook Islands.

Caps and goals updated as of 6 September 2019, after the game against the Cook Islands.

| No. | Pos. | Player | Date of birth (age) | Caps | Goals | Club |
|---|---|---|---|---|---|---|
| 1 | GK | Serah Alpefolosia | 17 June 2001 (age 25) | 3 | 0 | (Solomon Islands Football Federation) Bula Frangipani |
| 12 | GK | Florence Ince | 9 February 2003 (age 23) | 0 | 0 | (Solomon Islands Football Federation) Bula Frangipani |
| 2 | DF | Edith Nari (captain) | 28 August 2003 (age 23) | 3 | 1 | (Solomon Islands Football Federation) Marist |
| 3 | DF | Debra Kali | 25 December 2002 (age 23) | 3 | 0 | (Solomon Islands Football Federation) Bula Frangipani |
| 5 | DF | Margaret Samani | 6 December 2002 (age 23) | 3 | 0 | (Solomon Islands Football Federation) Solomon Warriors |
| 8 | DF | Cathy Fonoisimae | 8 May 2002 (age 24) | 2 | 0 | (Solomon Islands Football Federation) Koloale FC Honiara |
| 13 | DF | Indy Ringo | 14 September 2001 (age 25) | 2 | 0 | (Solomon Islands Football Federation) Koloale FC Honiara |
| 15 | DF | Rose Arata | 25 November 2001 (age 24) | 1 | 0 | (Solomon Islands Football Federation) Bula Frangipani |
| 16 | DF | Sharoly Saeni | 25 January 2003 (age 23) | 3 | 0 | (Solomon Islands Football Federation) Solomon Warriors |
| 4 | MF | Sandra Wale | 11 September 2003 (age 23) | 2 | 0 | (Solomon Islands Football Federation) Solomon Warriors |
| 6 | MF | Cecilia Omearo | 20 December 2000 (age 25) | 0 | 0 | (Solomon Islands Football Federation) Bula Frangipani |
| 14 | MF | Mavis Wale | 1 July 2001 (age 25) | 1 | 0 | (Solomon Islands Football Federation) Bula Frangipani |
| 17 | MF | Rachel Rex | 30 March 2003 (age 23) | 1 | 0 | (Solomon Islands Football Federation) Solomon Warriors |
| 18 | MF | Alisha Donga | 12 April 2002 (age 24) | 3 | 0 | (Solomon Islands Football Federation) Solomon Warriors |
| 19 | MF | Mercy Wateobea | 1 June 2001 (age 25) | 1 | 0 | (Solomon Islands Football Federation) Kossa |
| 7 | FW | Madlyn Arukau | 1 April 2003 (age 23) | 3 | 0 | (Solomon Islands Football Federation) Kossa |
| 9 | FW | Dollin Usua | 8 May 2001 (age 25) | 2 | 0 | (Solomon Islands Football Federation) Bula Frangipani |
| 10 | FW | Daylin Kali | 25 December 2002 (age 23) | 3 | 0 | (Solomon Islands Football Federation) Bula Frangipani |
| 11 | FW | Jojo Ledi | 30 June 2000 (age 26) | 1 | 1 | (Solomon Islands Football Federation) Solomon Warriors |
| 20 | FW | Melissa Marei | 30 June 2001 (age 25) | 2 | 0 | (Solomon Islands Football Federation) Solomon Warriors |

=== Recent call-ups ===
The following players have been called up for the team in the last 12 months.

| No. | Pos. | Player | Date of birth (age) | Caps | Goals | Club |
|---|---|---|---|---|---|---|
| | GK | Meria Tebaua | | 0 | 0 | (Solomon Islands Football Federation) KGVI School |
| | GK | Gnishilda Forau | | 0 | 0 | (Solomon Islands Football Federation) |
| | DF | Eileen Ben | | 0 | 0 | (Solomon Islands Football Federation) Solomon Warriors |
| | DF | Margaret Namoi | | 0 | 0 | (Solomon Islands Football Federation) Bula Frangipani |
| | DF | Lilian Mafane | | 0 | 0 | (Solomon Islands Football Federation) Bula Frangipani |
| | DF | Veronica Samani | | 0 | 0 | (Solomon Islands Football Federation) Panatina |
| | MF | Kobira Gulua | | 0 | 0 | (Solomon Islands Football Federation) Solomon Warriors |
| | MF | Grace Molou | | 0 | 0 | (Solomon Islands Football Federation) Panatina |
| | MF | Mary Bae | | 0 | 0 | (Solomon Islands Football Federation) Kossa |
| | MF | Juliet Vili | | 0 | 0 | (Solomon Islands Football Federation) |
| | FW | Christina Yankie | | 0 | 0 | (Solomon Islands Football Federation) Bula Frangipani |
