= Samoa women's national under-20 football team =

National association football team

Samoa Women's U-20
- Association: Football Federation Samoa
- Confederation: OFC (Oceania)
- Head coach: (Guatemala) Juan José Chang
- Most caps: Epi Tafili, Mariecamillia Ah Ki, Shalom Fiso (9)
- Top scorer: Shalom Fiso, Suitupe Tafafa (6)
- Home stadium: Luganville Soccer City Stadium
- FIFA code: SAM
First colours	Second colours

First international
- New Zealand 10 – 0 Samoa (Nuku'alofa, Tonga; 23 April 2002)

Biggest win
- New Caledonia 2 – 6 Samoa (‘Atele, Tonga; 5 October 2015)

Biggest defeat
- New Zealand 30 – 0 Samoa (Matavera, Cook Islands; 31 August 2019)

World Cup
- Appearances: 0

OFC U-20 Women's Championship
- Appearances: 7 (first in 2002)
- Best result: Second place (2015)

The Samoa women's national under-20 football team is the highest women's youth team of women's football in Samoa and is controlled by the Samoan Football Federation.

== Records ==
=== OFC Championship Record ===
OFC U-20 Women's Championship
Year	Round	Pld	W	D	L	GF	GA
(Tonga) 2002	Fourth Place	4	1	1	2	4	15
(Papua New Guinea) 2004	Did not Participate						
(Samoa) 2006	Fourth Place	5	3	0	2	10	7
(New Zealand) 2010	Did not Participate						
(New Zealand) 2012	Fourth Place	3	0	1	2	2	18
(New Zealand) 2014	Did not Participate						
(Tonga) 2015	Second Place	4	1	2	1	12	18
(New Zealand) 2017	Fifth Place	5	0	3	2	4	11
(Cook Islands) 2019	Group stage	3	0	0	3	2	43
(Fiji) 2023	Third Place	6	4	1	1	10	9
(French Polynesia) 2025	Withdrew						
Total	7/10	30	6	8	13	44	121

== Current technical staff ==
Position	
Head coach	(Guatemala) Juan José Chang
Manager	(Samoa) Nafanua
Assistant Coach	(Samoa) Suitupe Iosefa
Technical Advisor	(Samoa) Silao Malo
Head of Delegation	(Samoa) Afamasaga Kapisi
Chief Scout	(New Zealand) Alastair McLae
Assistant Chief Scout	(England) Russ Gurr

== Current squad ==
The following players were called up for the 2019 OFC U-19 Women's Championship from 30 August–12 September in Avarua, the Cook Islands.

Caps and goals updated as of 7 September 2019, after the game against Tahiti.

No.	Pos.	Player	Date of birth (age)	Caps	Goals	Club
1	GK	Repeka Asofa Salele	25 December 2000 (age 25)	2	0	(Football Federation Samoa) Kiwi
23	GK	Alana Tualaulelei	24 January 2001 (age 25)	2	0	(United States Soccer Federation) Kaoi Soccer Club
2	DF	Michayla Chamberlain	24 March 2001 (age 25)	3	0	(New Zealand Football) Western Springs
3	DF	Paepae Tuitama	7 October 2001 (age 25)	2	0	(Football Federation Samoa) Faleasiu
4	DF	Vineta Faalena	26 January 2002 (age 24)	0	0	
8	DF	Mole Saofaiga	18 August 2000 (age 26)	4	0	(Football Federation Samoa) Kiwi
9	DF	Angela Von Heiderbrandt	9 March 2001 (age 25)	2	0	(Football Federation Samoa) Adidas
15	DF	Helina Paulo	6 January 2002 (age 24)	0	0	(Football Federation Samoa) Kiwi
16	DF	Lusia Schuster	7 November 2001 (age 24)	3	0	(Football Federation Samoa) Moataa
17	DF	Fofoga Samuela	4 June 2001 (age 25)	3	0	(Football Federation Samoa) Faleasiu
7	MF	Pisila Ionatana	3 February 2000 (age 26)	3	0	(Football Federation Samoa) Faatoia United
11	MF	Mata Taliu	24 January 2002 (age 24)	2	0	(Football Federation Samoa) Kiwi
12	MF	Tiare Tuimavave	13 June 2001 (age 25)	3	0	(United States Soccer Federation) Surf Soccer Hawaii
13	MF	Zoe Rubby	12 November 2001 (age 24)	3	2	(New Zealand Football) Eastern Suburbs
18	MF	Dawn Fetalaiga	23 January 2003 (age 23)	2	0	(Football Federation Samoa) Lotopa
19	MF	Nefu Wong	16 February 2002 (age 24)	0	0	(Football Federation Samoa) Lepea
5	FW	Afioga Faalogoaso	9 November 2000 (age 25)	0	0	(Football Federation Samoa) Lupe o le Soaga
6	FW	Lefiufinau Salu Finau	18 February 2002 (age 24)	3	0	(Football Federation Samoa) Salafai
10	FW	Madaleen Ah Ki	30 September 2002 (age 24)	7	2	(Football Australia) Queensland Lions
14	FW	Talaisea Mulitalo	7 February 2000 (age 26)	0	0	(Football Federation Samoa) Kiwi
