= New Caledonia women's national under-20 football team =

National association youth football team

New Caledonia women's U20
- Association: Fédération Calédonienne de Football
- Confederation: OFC (Oceania)
- Head coach: (New Caledonia) Coralie Bretegnier
- Top scorer: Marie Heutro (4)
- Home stadium: Stade Numa-Daly Magenta
- FIFA code: NCL
First colours	Second colours

First international
- Papua New Guinea 1–4 New Caledonia (Apia, Samoa; March 31, 2006)

Biggest win
- New Caledonia 8–0 Papua New Guinea (Matavera, Cook Islands; August 30, 2019)

Biggest defeat
- New Zealand 26–0 New Caledonia (‘Atele, Tonga; October 3, 2015)

OFC U-20 Women's Championship
- Appearances: 7 (first in 2006)
- Best result: Runners-up (2019, 2025)

FIFA U-20 Women's World Cup
- Appearances: 1 (first in 2026)
- Best result: Group stage (2026)

The New Caledonia women's national under-20 football team is the highest women's youth team of New Caledonia and is controlled by the Fédération Calédonienne de Football.

== Information ==
=== Football in Tonga ===
Tonga's greatest football triumph to date was their triumph in the first ever Polynesian Cup held in 1993 over Samoa and the Cook Islands. Although local players have not yet made their mark on big leagues abroad, the Chief Executive of the Tonga Football Association, Joe Topou, was appointed to the FIFA Executive Committee in 2002. The Tonga association is the only sports organization on the island that employs full-time administrative staff.

=== The second Goal project ===
Tonga's second Goal project will develop and improve the national football academy and the associations headquarters in Atele, Tongatapu, which was built in the country's first Goal project. This development work will ensure that all of the Tonga Football Associations needs are fully satisfied. Local matches will be held at the football academy, while the administration's requirements, including the needs of players, officials and spectators, will also be covered. The football school will be transformed into a House of Football.

== Records ==
=== OFC Championship Record ===
OFC U-20 Women's Championship
Year	Round	Pld	W	D	L	GF	GA	GD
(Tonga) 2002	Did not Participate							
(Papua New Guinea) 2004	Did not Participate							
(Samoa) 2006	Group stage	3	0	0	3	0	9	-9
(New Zealand) 2010	Did not Participate							
(New Zealand) 2012	Third Place	3	1	0	2	8	15	-7
(New Zealand) 2014	Did not Participate							
(Tonga) 2015	Fifth Place	4	1	0	3	5	38	-33
(New Zealand) 2017	Fourth Place	5	2	0	3	5	22	-17
(Cook Islands) 2019	2nd Place	4	3	0	1	15	7	+8
(Fiji) 2023	Quarter-finals	4	3	0	1	11	2	+9
Total	6/10	23	10	0	13	44	93	-49

=== FIFA U-20 Women's World Cup ===
FIFA U-20 Women's World Cup
Year	Result	Matches	Wins	Draws*	Losses	GF	GA	Squad
(Canada) 2002	Did not qualify							
(Thailand) 2004	Did not qualify							
(Russia) 2006	Did not qualify							
(Chile) 2008	Did not qualify							
(Germany) 2010	Did not qualify							
(Japan) 2012	Did not qualify							
(Canada) 2014	Did not qualify							
(Papua New Guinea) 2016	Did not qualify							
(France) 2018	Did not qualify							
(Costa Rica) 2022	Did not qualify							
(Colombia) 2024	Did not qualify							
(Poland) 2026	Group stage	3	0	0	3	1	26	Squad
Total:1/12	Group stage	3	0	0	3	1	26	-

== Current technical staff ==
Position	
Head coach	(New Caledonia) Coralie Bretegnier
Assistant Coach	(New Caledonia) Paulette Wejin
Head of Delegation	(France) Adrien Apikaoua

== 2017 squad ==
The following players were called up for the 2017 OFC U-19 Women's Championship

Caps and goals correct after the match against Fiji on July 24, 2017.

No.	Pos.	Player	Date of birth (age)	Caps	Goals	Club
1	GK	Karine Xozame	15 November 1999 (age 26)	5	0	(New Caledonian Football Federation) Wetr
20	GK	Kathleen Waunie	7 August 1999 (age 27)	0	0	(New Caledonian Football Federation) Lössi
2	DF	Darnelle Hace	16 October 2000 (age 25)	5	0	(New Caledonian Football Federation) Pole des Iles
3	DF	Josephine Sakilia	10 November 1999 (age 26)	4	0	(New Caledonian Football Federation) OMS Paita
4	DF	Ami-Nata Ajapuhnya	11 March 1999 (age 27)	4	0	(New Caledonian Football Federation) Wetr
5	DF	Sonia Hnanganyan	23 September 1998 (age 28)	5	0	(New Caledonian Football Federation) OMS Paita
7	DF	Oceane Forest	12 September 1998 (age 28)	5	1	(New Caledonian Football Federation) Lössi
11	DF	Jeanine Humunie	26 October 2000 (age 25)	2	0	(New Caledonian Football Federation) Pole des Iles
6	MF	Isabelle Llengo	29 July 2000 (age 26)	5	0	(New Caledonian Football Federation) Pole des Iles
8	MF	Shaya Ihmeling	9 January 1999 (age 27)	5	0	(New Caledonian Football Federation) Gaïtcha FCN
10	MF	Marie-Laure Palene	16 July 2001 (age 25)	4	1	(New Caledonian Football Federation) OMS Paita
12	MF	Johanna Takamatsu	11 December 1999 (age 26)	2	0	(New Caledonian Football Federation) OMS Paita
13	MF	Ivonne Xowi	22 July 2000 (age 26)	5	0	(New Caledonian Football Federation) Gaïtcha FCN
14	MF	Cassidy Cawa	5 April 2000 (age 26)	3	0	(New Caledonian Football Federation) Wetr
16	MF	Danatienne Baly	25 April 2000 (age 26)	1	0	(New Caledonian Football Federation) Pole des Iles
17	MF	Moisette Broustet	3 November 1999 (age 26)	4	0	(New Caledonian Football Federation) OMS Paita
19	MF	Marie Waneux	5 June 2000 (age 26)	1	0	(New Caledonian Football Federation) OMS Paita
9	FW	Alice Wenessia	24 July 1999 (age 27)	5	2	(New Caledonian Football Federation) Gaïtcha FCN
15	FW	Valerie Holue	2 December 1999 (age 26)	1	0	(New Caledonian Football Federation) Tiga Sports
18	FW	Isabelle Hnaweongo	18 February 1999 (age 27)	3	1	(New Caledonian Football Federation) Pole des Iles
