= Preeya Singh =

Fijian footballer (born 2001)

Personal information
- Full name: Preeya Chandra Singh
- Date of birth: August 19, 2004 (age 22)
- Place of birth: Manteca, California, U.S.
- Height: 1.58 m (5 ft 2 in)
- Position: Defender

Team information
- Current team: UC Merced Golden Bobcats

College career
| Years | Team | Apps | (Gls) |
| 2022– | UC Merced Golden Bobcats | 32 | (0) |

International career
| 2023– | Fiji | 6 | (1) |

Preeya Chandra Singh (born August 19, 2004) is a footballer who played as a defender for the UC Merced Golden Bobcats. Born in the United States, she is a Fiji international.

== Life and career ==
Singh was born in the United States. She grew up in Manteca, California. She is of Indian and Fijian descent. She started playing football at age four. She attended Sierra High School and played for their soccer team. She now studies biology at the University of California, Merced, where she is regarded as one of their most prominent football players.

Singh mainly operates as a defender, typically as a center-back or a full-back, although she occasionally serves as a midfielder. As a Fiji youth international, Singh played for the Fiji women's national under-20 football team at the 2023 OFC U-19 Women's Championship, and helped the team achieve second place. She then played for the Fiji women's national football team at the 2024 OFC Women's Olympic Qualifying Tournament. However, the team was unable to achieve qualification for the 2024 Summer Olympics.
