= Petria Rennie =

New Zealand footballer

Personal information
- Full name: Petria Rennie
- Date of birth: 17 June 1987 (age 39)
- Position: Defender

International career
Years	Team	Apps	(Gls)
2008	New Zealand	1	(0)

Petria Rennie (born 17 June 1987) is a former association football player who represented New Zealand at international level.

Rennie represented New Zealand U-20 at the 2006 FIFA U-20 Women's World Championship in Russia, playing two group games.

Rennie has made a single appearance for Football Ferns in a 0–6 loss to Japan on 21 May 2005.
