= Judith Kuipers =

Dutch football manager

Personal information
- Date of birth: November 9, 1972 (age 54)
- Place of birth: Netherlands
- Position: Defender

Senior career*
Years	Team	Apps	(Gls)
2007–2008	FC Utrecht		

Managerial career
- 2018–2019: VV Alkmaar
- 2019–: Cook Islands (women)
- * Club domestic league appearances and goals

Judith Kuipers (born 9 November 1972) is a Dutch football manager who serves as head coach of the Cook Islands women's national football team.

== Career ==
Kuipers started her managerial career with VV Alkmaar in 2018. In 2019, she was appointed head coach of the Cook Islands women's national football team.
