= Vahuariki Tufaunui =

Tahitian footballer (born 2002)

Personal information
- Full name: Vahuariki Tevahinerereata Danielle Tufaunui
- Date of birth: 5 September 2002 (age 24)
- Place of birth: Papeete, Tahiti
- Position: Midfielder

Team information
- Current team: Toulouse FC

International career
| Years | Team | Apps | (Gls) |
- Tahiti

Vahuariki Tevahinerereata Danielle Tufaunui (born 5 September 2002) is a Tahitian professional footballer who plays as a midfielder for Toulouse FC in the Division 1 Féminine and for the Tahiti women's national football team.

Tufaunui was born in Papeete. In Tahiti she played for A.S.Tefana.

In 2017 she was selected for the Tahiti women's national under-17 football team for the 2017 OFC U-16 Women's Championship. In 2018 she was selected for the Tahiti women's national football team for the 2018 OFC Women's Nations Cup. In February 2022 she was selected for Tahiti's friendly matches against Luxembourg and Andorra. In July 2022 she was named to the squad for the 2022 OFC Women's Nations Cup.

In 2020 she joined Toulouse FC.
