= Melissa Ray =

New Zealand footballer

Personal information
- Full name: Melissa Ray
- Date of birth: 25 April 1984 (age 42)

International career^{‡}
Years	Team	Apps	(Gls)
2003–2009	New Zealand	8	(0)
- ‡ National team caps and goals as of 23:53, 15 November 2009 (UTC)

Melissa Ray (born 25 April 1984) is an association football player who represented New Zealand at international level.

Ray made her Football Ferns début as a substitute in 9-0 World Cup qualifier win over Cook Islands on 9 April 2003, and finished her international career with eight caps to her credit.

Ray was one of the first New Zealand LGBT+ citizens to marry her then partner, Tash Vitali, after the Marriage (Definition of Marriage) Amendment Bill entered into law. The wedding made international news, but the marriage ended a year later.
