= Pip Meo =

New Zealand footballer

Personal information
- Full name: Pip Meo
- Date of birth: 6 January 1984 (age 42)

International career
Years	Team	Apps	(Gls)
2004	New Zealand	5	(0)

Pip Meo (born 6 January 1984) is a former association football player who represented New Zealand at international level.

Meo made her Football Ferns début in a 0–2 loss to Australia on 18 February 2004, and finished her international career with five caps to her credit.
