= Helen Collins =

New Zealand association footballer

Helen Arjomandi (née Collins)
Personal information
- Full name: Helen Arjomandi
- Date of birth: 30 October 1988 (age 38)
- Place of birth: Thames, New Zealand
- Height: 1.79 m (5 ft 10 1/2 in)
- Position: Striker

Team information
- Current team: Taupo AFC
- Number: 9

Senior career*
Years	Team	Apps	(Gls)
2011-2015	Claudelands Rovers		
2019-2022	Hamilton Wanderers FC		
2023-	Taupo AFC		

International career^{‡}
2006	New Zealand U-20	9	(7)
2013–2015	New Zealand	25	(6)
- * Club domestic league appearances and goals ‡ National team caps and goals as of 10 October 2013

Helen Arjomandi (née Collins) was born in Thames, New Zealand on 30 October 1988 and has represented New Zealand in association football at international level. She plays her club football with Taupo AFC.

Collins was a member of the New Zealand U-20 side at the 2006 FIFA U-20 Women's World Championship, making just two appearances at the finals in Russia.

Collins made her senior début in a 1–0 win over Scotland on 6 March 2013.

== International goals ==
No.	Date	Venue	Opponent	Score	Result	Competition
1.	25 October 2014	Kalabond Oval, Kokopo, Papua New Guinea	Tonga	5–0	16–0	2014 OFC Women's Nations Cup
2.	25 October 2014	Kalabond Oval, Kokopo, Papua New Guinea	Tonga	10–0	16–0	2014 OFC Women's Nations Cup
3.	25 October 2014	Kalabond Oval, Kokopo, Papua New Guinea	Tonga	12–0	16–0	2014 OFC Women's Nations Cup
4.	29 October 2014	Kalabond Oval, Kokopo, Papua New Guinea	Cook Islands	1–0	11–0	2014 OFC Women's Nations Cup
5.	29 October 2014	Kalabond Oval, Kokopo, Papua New Guinea	Cook Islands	4–0	11–0	2014 OFC Women's Nations Cup
