= Emma Rolston =

New Zealand association football player

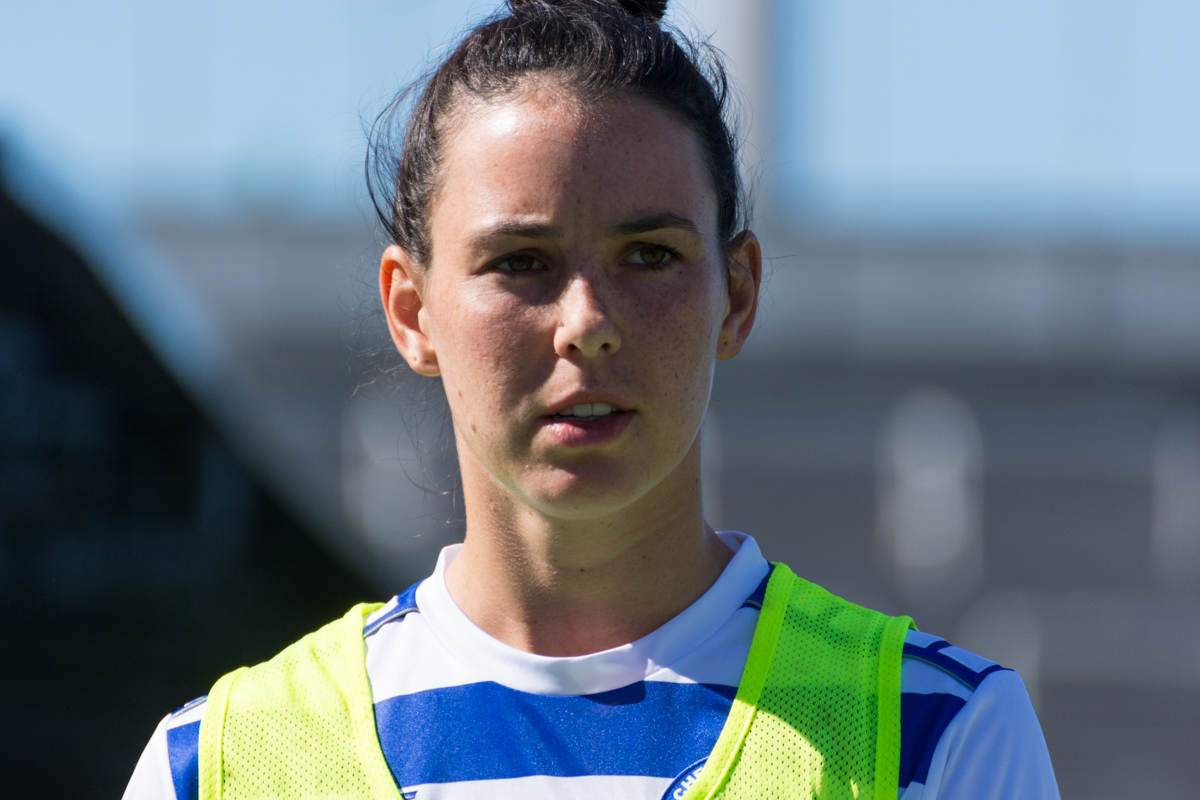

Personal information
- Full name: Emma Caitlin Rolston
- Date of birth: 10 November 1996 (age 30)
- Place of birth: Wellington, New Zealand
- Height: 1.68 m (5 ft 6 in)
- Position: Midfielder

Senior career*
Years	Team	Apps	(Gls)
2011–13	Waterside Karori	26	(59)
2014–16	Forrest Hill Milford	15	(24)
2017	Illawarra Stingrays	9	(13)
2017–2018	Sydney FC	2	(0)
2018	Wellington United	3	(8)
2018–2019	MSV Duisburg	5	(1)
2021	Arna-Bjørnar	7	(2)
2022	Avaldsnes IL	11	(1)
2022–2023	Wellington Phoenix	11	(0)
2025-	Auckland United FC		

International career
2011–2012	New Zealand U17	11	(6)
2014–2016	New Zealand U20	26	(32)
2018–	New Zealand	10	(6)
- * Club domestic league appearances and goals as of 10 August 2023

Emma Caitlin Rolston (born 10 November 1996) is a New Zealand professional football player. She currently plays for Auckland United FC in the NRFL Women's Premiership.

== Club career ==
=== Forrest Hill Milford ===
In 2016 Rolston was part of the winning team at Forrest Hill Milford in the Women's Knockout Cup, scoring in the final and beating Glenfield Rovers 4–3 on penalties (2–2 at full-time).

=== Illawarra Stingrays ===
In April 2017, Rolston moved from New Zealand to Australia to play for the Illawarra Stingrays in the NSW NPL.

=== Sydney FC ===
On 15 October 2017, Emma Rolston joined Sydney FC.

=== MSV Duisburg ===
On 25 May 2018, Rolston signed a 1-year contract with MSV Duisburg in the German Frauen-Bundesliga. After six appearances, she left the club following trouble with injuries.

=== Wellington Phoenix ===
On 1 November 2022, Emma Rolston Joined Wellington Phoenix FC (A-League Women). In August 2023, new coach Temple announced that Rolston and her team-mate Paige Satchell decided not to extend their time at the club.

== International career ==
Rolston has represented New Zealand at U-17 in 2010 and U-20 in 2012 and 2014 at the Women's World Cup. Rolston scored twice at the U-20 World Cup in 2014, once in the 2–0 win over Paraguay in group play and once in the 1–4 loss to Nigeria in the quarter-finals.

== International goals ==
No.	Date	Venue	Opponent	Score	Result	Competition
1.	22 November 2018	Stade Numa-Daly Magenta, Nouméa, New Caledonia	Cook Islands	2–0	6–0	2018 OFC Women's Nations Cup
2.	22 November 2018	Stade Numa-Daly Magenta, Nouméa, New Caledonia	Cook Islands	3–0	6–0	2018 OFC Women's Nations Cup
3.	25 November 2018	Stade Numa-Daly Magenta, Nouméa, New Caledonia	Fiji	9–0	10–0	2018 OFC Women's Nations Cup
4.	28 November 2018	Stade de Hnassé, Lifou, New Caledonia	New Caledonia	2–0	8–0	2018 OFC Women's Nations Cup
5.	28 November 2018	Stade de Hnassé, Lifou, New Caledonia	New Caledonia	3–0	8–0	2018 OFC Women's Nations Cup
6.	28 November 2018	Stade de Hnassé, Lifou, New Caledonia	New Caledonia	7–0	8–0	2018 OFC Women's Nations Cup

== Honours ==
=== Club ===
Forrest Hill Milford:

- Women's Knockout Cup: 2016

=== International ===
New Zealand U17

- OFC U-17s winners: 2012

New Zealand U20

- OFC U-20s winners: 2014, 2015
- FIFA U-20 quarter-finals: 2014
