= OFC U-19 Women's Championship =

- Founded: 2002
- Region: Oceania (OFC)
- Teams: Various
- Current champions: New Zealand (9th title)
- Most championships: New Zealand (9 titles)
- 2025 OFC U-19 Women's Championship

The OFC U-19 Women's Championship (previously the OFC U-20 Women's Championship or OFC Women's Under 20 Qualifying Tournament) is a football tournament held every two years to decide the only qualification spot for the Oceania Football Confederation (OFC) representative at the FIFA U-20 Women's World Cup.

Until 2006 it was an under-19 tournament. The most recent edition for 1 to 15 July 2017 was again an U-19 tournament, and the tournament was called the OFC U-19 Women's Championship.

== Summaries ==
Year	Host	Final			Third Place Match		
Year	Host	Champion	Score	Second Place	Third Place	Score	Fourth Place
First U19 era
2002 details	Tonga	Australia	6–0	New Zealand	Tonga	2–0	Samoa
2004 details	Papua New Guinea	Australia	RR	Papua New Guinea	Solomon Islands	RR	
U20 era
2006 details	Samoa	New Zealand	6–0	Tonga	Papua New Guinea	4–1	Samoa
2010 details	New Zealand	New Zealand	RR	Cook Islands	Tonga	RR	American Samoa
2012 details	New Zealand	New Zealand	RR	Papua New Guinea	New Caledonia	RR	Samoa
2014 details	New Zealand	New Zealand	RR	Papua New Guinea	Tonga	RR	Vanuatu
2015 details	Tonga	New Zealand	RR	Samoa	Vanuatu	RR	New Caledonia
Second U19 era
2017 details	New Zealand	New Zealand	RR	Fiji	Papua New Guinea	RR	New Caledonia
2019 details	Cook Islands	New Zealand	5–2	New Caledonia	Tahiti	4–1	Vanuatu
2022 details	Cancelled						
2023 details	Fiji	New Zealand	7–0	Fiji	Samoa	2–1	Cook Islands
2025 details	Tahiti	New Zealand	3–0	New Caledonia	Fiji	0–0(a.e.t.) (3–2 p)	Cook Islands

== Performances by countries ==
Team	Titles	Runners-up	Third-place	Fourth-place
New Zealand	9 (2006, 2010, 2012, 2014, 2015, 2017, 2019, 2023, 2025)	1 (2002)		
Australia	2 (2002, 2004)			
Papua New Guinea		3 (2004, 2012, 2014)	2 (2006, 2017)	
New Caledonia		2 (2019, 2025)	1 (2012)	2 (2015, 2017)
Fiji		2 (2017, 2023)	1 (2025)	
Tonga		1 (2006)	3 (2002, 2010, 2014)	
Samoa		1 (2015)	1 (2023)	3 (2002, 2006, 2012)
Cook Islands		1 (2010)		2 (2023, 2025)
Vanuatu			1 (2015)	2 (2014, 2019)
Solomon Islands			1 (2004)	
Tahiti			1 (2019)	
American Samoa				1 (2010)

== Participating nations ==
Legend

- 1st – Champions
- 2nd – Runners-up
- 3rd – Third place
- 4th – Fourth place
- SF – Semi-finals
- 5th–7th – Fifth to Seventh place
- GS – Group stage
- PR – Preliminary round
- q – Qualified
- – Hosts
- •• – Qualified but withdrew
- × – Did not enter
- • – Did not qualify
- × – Withdrew / Banned / Entry not accepted by FIFA
- — Country not affiliated to OFC at that time
- — Country did not exist or national team was inactive
- – Not affiliated to FIFA

Team	(Tonga) 2002	(Papua New Guinea) 2004	(Samoa) 2006	(New Zealand) 2010	(New Zealand) 2012	(New Zealand) 2014	(Tonga) 2015	(New Zealand) 2017	(Cook Islands) 2019	(Fiji) 2023	(French Polynesia) 2025	Total
American Samoa	GS	×	×	4th	×	×	×	×	GS	×	•	3
Australia	1st	1st	AFC member									2
Cook Islands	GS	×	×	2nd	×	×	×	×	GS	4th	4th	5
Fiji	GS	×	GS	×	×	×	×	2nd	GS	2nd	3rd	6
New Caledonia	×	×	GS	×	3rd	×	4th	4th	2nd	QF	2nd	7
New Zealand	2nd	×	1st	1st	1st	1st	1st	1st	1st	1st	1st	10
Papua New Guinea	×	2nd	3rd	×	2nd	2nd	× (Note: Papua New Guinea did not compete in 2015, as they had already qualified for the 2016 FIFA U-20 Women's World Cup as hosts.)	3rd	GS	GS	×	7
Samoa	4th	×	4th	×	4th	×	2nd	5th	GS	3rd	••	8
Solomon Islands	×	3rd	GS	×	×	×	×	×	GS	QF	•	4
Tahiti	×	×	×	×	×	×	×	×	3rd	QF	6th	3
Tonga	3rd	×	2nd	3rd	×	3rd	5th	6th	GS	GS	5th	9
Vanuatu	×	×	GS	×	×	4th	3rd	×	4th	QF	GS	6

== Women's U-20 World Cup record ==
Legend

- 1st – Champions
- 2nd – Runners-up
- 3rd – Third place
- 4th – Fourth place
- QF – Quarterfinals
- GS – Group stage
- – Hosts

Team	(Canada) 2002	(Thailand) 2004	(Russia) 2006	(Chile) 2008	(Germany) 2010	(Japan) 2012	(Canada) 2014	(Papua New Guinea) 2016	(France) 2018	(Costa Rica) 2022	(Colombia) 2024	(Poland) 2026	Total
Australia	QF	QF	AFC member										2
Fiji											GS		1
New Zealand			GS	GS	GS	GS	QF	GS	GS	GS	GS	GS	10
Papua New Guinea								GS					1
New Caledonia												GS	1
