= Caitlin Campbell =

New Zealand footballer

Personal information
- Full name: Caitlin Campbell
- Date of birth: 2 February 1991 (age 35)
- Place of birth: Hastings, New Zealand
- Height: 1.73 m (5 ft 8 in)
- Position: Midfielder

Team information
- Current team: Mt Druitt Town Rangers
- Number: 16

International career^{‡}
Years	Team	Apps	(Gls)
2008	New Zealand U-17		
2008	New Zealand U-20	18	(8)
2006–	New Zealand	5	(1)
- ‡ National team caps and goals as of 15 November 2009

Caitlin Campbell (born 2 February 1991) is a New Zealand association football player who represented her country.

She was a member of the New Zealand squad in the inaugural FIFA U-17 Women's World Cup, playing 2 group games; a 0–1 loss to Canada, and a 1–2 loss to Denmark.

Campbell also represented New Zealand at the 2008 FIFA U-20 Women's World Cup in Chile, playing all 3 group games; a 2–3 loss to Nigeria, a 4–3 win over hosts Chile, and a 1–1 draw with England.

Campbell made her senior Football Ferns début in a 0–3 loss to China on 14 November 2006.
