= Daisy Cleverley =

New Zealand footballer

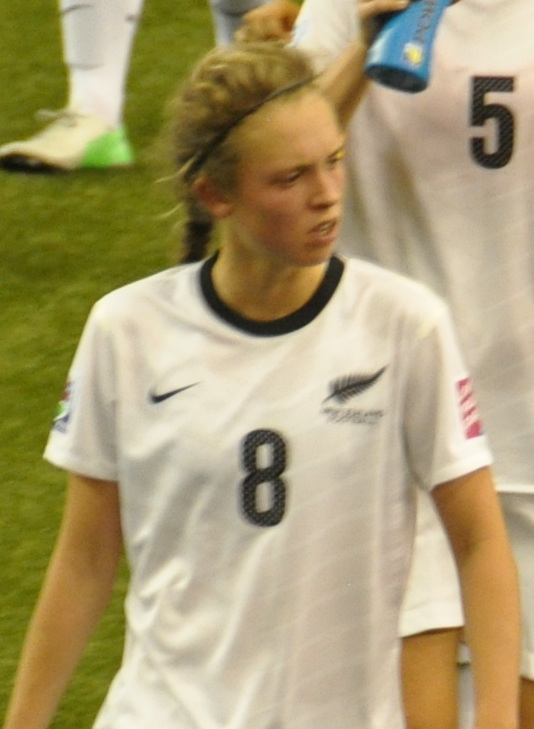

Personal information
- Full name: Daisy Grace Wilson Cleverley
- Date of birth: 30 April 1997 (age 29)
- Place of birth: Auckland, New Zealand
- Height: 1.67 m (5 ft 6 in)
- Position: Midfielder

Youth career
- Western Springs AFC
- Lynn-Avon United
- Eastern Suburbs AFC
- Forrest Hill-Milford United

College career
Years	Team	Apps	(Gls)
2017–2019	California Golden Bears	50	(1)
2020–2022	Georgetown Hoyas	14	(2)

Senior career*
Years	Team	Apps	(Gls)
2022–2024	HB Køge	35	(4)

International career^{‡}
2012–2014	New Zealand U17	14	(4)
2014–2016	New Zealand U20	8	(1)
2014–2024	New Zealand	39	(2)
- * Club domestic league appearances and goals as of 20 September 2024 ‡ National team caps and goals as of 20 September 2024

Daisy Grace Wilson Cleverley (born 30 April 1997) is a New Zealand former footballer who played as a midfielder.

== College ==
Cleverley enrolled at the University of California, Berkeley in spring 2017. She played 14 matches for the Golden Bears in her freshman year, scoring her first collegiate goal on 19 October 2017 in a 1–0 win over Oregon State before suffering a season-ending ACL injury.

== International career ==
=== Youth ===
Cleverley was a member of the New Zealand U-17 side at the 2012 FIFA U-17 Women's World Cup in Azerbaijan and again at the 2014 FIFA U-17 Women's World Cup in Costa Rica, playing all of New Zealand's group games at both tournaments.

At the 2014 FIFA U-20 Women's World Cup in Canada, Cleverley played in all three of New Zealand's group games and the quarter-final match which they lost to Nigeria.

=== Senior ===
On 25 October 2014, Cleverley made her senior international debut, starting in a 16–0 win over Tonga and scoring two goals.

She was part of New Zealand's squad at the 2015 FIFA Women's World Cup in Canada. In 2019, Cleverley was included in her second World Cup squad.

== International goals ==
No.	Date	Venue	Opponent	Score	Result	Competition
1.	25 October 2014	Kalabond Oval, Kokopo, Papua New Guinea	Tonga	1–0	16–0	2014 OFC Women's Nations Cup
2.	25 October 2014	Kalabond Oval, Kokopo, Papua New Guinea	Tonga	4–0	16–0	2014 OFC Women's Nations Cup
