= 2006 OFC U-20 Women's Championship =

2006 OFC Women's U-20 Championship
Tournament details
- Host country: Samoa
- Dates: 31 March–8 April 2006
- Teams: 8 (from 1 confederation)
- Venue: 1 (in 1 host city)

Final positions
- Champions: New Zealand (1st title)
- Runners-up: Tonga
- Third place: Papua New Guinea
- Fourth place: Samoa

Tournament statistics
- Matches played: 16
- Goals scored: 74 (4.63 per match)
- Top scorer(s): (Samoa) Suitupe Tafafa (New Zealand) Kirsty Yallop (6 goals)

The 2006 OFC Women's U-20 Championship was the 3rd edition of the OFC U-20 Women's Championship, a biennial international football competition for women's under-20 national teams organised by Oceania Football Confederation. The final tournament was hosted for the first time in Samoa from 31 March–8 April 2006.

Players born on or after 1 January 1986 were eligible to participate in the competition. Holders Australia were not eligible to defend their title after moving into the Asian Football Confederation.

In the final, New Zealand defeated Tonga 6–0. In doing so, the New Zealand team won their first title in this competition, having previously lost the 2002 final to Australia.

By winning the title, New Zealand also qualified for the 2006 FIFA U-20 Women's World Championship in Russia.

== Qualification ==
All members of the Oceania Football Confederation qualified automatically, however, Cook Islands and Tahiti withdrew before the tournament began.

=== Participating teams ===
The following teams participated in the 2006 OFC U-20 Women's Championship tournament:

Country	Previous appearances^{1}
Fiji	1 (2002)
New Caledonia	0 (debut)
New Zealand	1 (2002)
Papua New Guinea	1 (2004)
Samoa	1 (2002)
Solomon Islands	1 (2004)
Tonga	1 (2002)
Vanuatu	0 (debut)

^{1} Bold indicates champion for that year. Italic indicates host for that year.

== Venue ==
All matches were played at one venue: the Toleafoa JS Blatter Soccer Complex in Apia.

Apia
Toleafoa JS Blatter Soccer Complex
13°50′12″S 171°45′7″W
Capacity: **12,000**

== Group stage ==
=== Group A ===
Pos	Team	Pld	W	D	L	GF	GA	GD	Pts	Group stage result
1	New Zealand	3	3	0	0	22	0	+22	**9**	Advance to knockout stage
2	Tonga	3	2	0	1	6	9	−3	**6**	Advance to knockout stage
3	Solomon Islands	3	0	1	2	2	7	−5	**1**	
4	Vanuatu	3	0	1	2	2	16	−14	**1**	

Source: RSSSF
31 March 2006

New Zealand	4–0	Solomon Islands
Rishworth 51'; Percival 62', 79'; Riley 53'	Report

Toleafoa JS Blatter Soccer Complex, Apia
31 March 2006

Tonga	4–1	Vanuatu
Tuipulotu; Malua; Vaenuku	Report	Serveux

Toleafoa JS Blatter Soccer Complex, Apia

2 April 2006

New Zealand	11–0	Vanuatu
Erceg 30'; Gregorius 39'; Percival 41'; Bromley 42'; Leota 43'; Yallop 50', 57', 83'; Collins 46', 59'; Riley 60'	Report

Toleafoa JS Blatter Soccer Complex, Apia
2 April 2006

Solomon Islands	1–2	Tonga
Inifiri 61'	Report	Feke 39', 65'

Toleafoa JS Blatter Soccer Complex, Apia

4 April 2006

New Zealand	7–0	Tonga
Campbell 1'; Rennie 13'; Yallop 41', 63'; Harrison 43'; Riley 53'; Humphries 71'	Report

Toleafoa JS Blatter Soccer Complex, Apia
4 April 2006

Solomon Islands	1–1	Vanuatu
Samani 18'	Report	Masauvakalo 45'

Toleafoa JS Blatter Soccer Complex, Apia

=== Group B ===
Pos	Team	Pld	W	D	L	GF	GA	GD	Pts	Group stage result
1	Samoa (H)	3	3	0	0	7	0	+7	**9**	Advance to knockout stage
2	Papua New Guinea	3	2	0	1	9	2	+7	**6**	Advance to knockout stage
3	Fiji	3	1	0	2	4	9	−5	**3**	
4	New Caledonia	3	0	0	3	0	9	−9	**0**	

Source: RSSSF
(H) Hosts
31 March 2006

Papua New Guinea	3–0	New Caledonia
Turakaura 46'; Limbai 58'; Chalau 87'	Report

Toleafoa JS Blatter Soccer Complex, Apia
31 March 2006

Samoa	3–0	Fiji
Tafafa; J. Ane	Report

Toleafoa JS Blatter Soccer Complex, Apia

2 April 2006

Papua New Guinea	6–1	Fiji
Limbai 11', 18', 63', 66'; Nakas 12'; Winas 32'	Report	Ratu 83'

Toleafoa JS Blatter Soccer Complex, Apia
2 April 2006

Samoa	3–0	New Caledonia
Tafafa	Report

Toleafoa JS Blatter Soccer Complex, Apia

4 April 2006

Papua New Guinea	0–1	Samoa
	Report	Lam Sam 50'

Toleafoa JS Blatter Soccer Complex, Apia
4 April 2006

Fiji	3–0	New Caledonia
Marama 52'; Begum 77'; Ratu 82' (pen.)	Report

Toleafoa JS Blatter Soccer Complex, Apia

== Knockout stage ==
In the knockout stage, extra time and penalty shoot-out were used to decide the winner if necessary.

=== Bracket ===
Semi-finals
6 April
New Zealand	5
Papua New Guinea	1
6 April
Samoa	2
Tonga	3

Final
8 April
New Zealand	6
Tonga	0
Third place
8 April
Samoa	1
Papua New Guinea	4

=== Semi-finals ===
6 April 2006

New Zealand	5–1	Papua New Guinea
Campbell 6', 9', 18'; Yallop 40'; Riley 90'	Report	Leo 7'

Toleafoa JS Blatter Soccer Complex, Apia
Attendance: 1,000

6 April 2006

Samoa	2–3	Tonga
Taumua 11'; Tafafa 56'	Report	Utaatu 5' (pen.), 67' (pen.); Feke 73'

Toleafoa JS Blatter Soccer Complex, Apia
Attendance: 2,500

=== Third Place Match ===
8 April 2006

Samoa	1–4	Papua New Guinea
F. Ane 60'	Report	Chalau 6'; Leo 45', 83'; Winas 50'

Toleafoa JS Blatter Soccer Complex, Apia
Attendance: 4,500

=== Final ===
8 April 2006

New Zealand	6–0	Tonga
Campbell 8'; Riley 30'; Humphries 40'; Longo 44'; Collins 81'; Harrison 90'	Report

Toleafoa JS Blatter Soccer Complex, Apia
Attendance: 3,500

== Goalscorers ==
6 goals

- (New Zealand) Kirsty Yallop
- (Samoa) Suitupe Tafafa

5 goals

- (New Zealand) Caitlin Campbell
- (New Zealand) Ali Riley
- (Papua New Guinea) Zeena Limbai

3 goals

- (New Zealand) Helen Collins
- (New Zealand) Ria Percival
- (Papua New Guinea) Jennifer Leo
- (Tonga) Penateti Feke

2 goals

- (Fiji) Savaira Ratu
- (New Zealand) Emma Harrison
- (New Zealand) Emma Humphries
- (Papua New Guinea) Jacqueline Chalau
- (Papua New Guinea) Daisy Winas
- (Tonga) Marion Tuipulotu
- (Tonga) Karen Utaatu

1 goal

- (Fiji) Yashreen Begum
- (Fiji) Radalaite Marama
- (New Zealand) Hannah Bromley
- (New Zealand) Abby Erceg
- (New Zealand) Sarah Gregorius
- (New Zealand) Renee Leota
- (New Zealand) Annalie Longo
- (New Zealand) Petria Rennie
- (New Zealand) Hannah Rishworth
- (Papua New Guinea) Bridget Nakas
- (Papua New Guinea) Pauline Turakaura
- (Samoa) Frances Ane
- (Samoa) Josephone Ane
- (Samoa) Florence Lam Sam
- (Samoa) Faavae Taumua
- (Solomon Islands) Vanessa Inifiri
- (Solomon Islands) Layda Samani
- (Tonga) Kaati Malua
- (Tonga) Salome Vaenuku
- (Vanuatu) Leisoko Masauvakalo
- (Vanuatu) Fabrice Serveux

== Awards ==
- FairPlay Award: New Zealand
