= Tonga women's national under-20 football team =

National association football team

Tonga women's U20
- Association: Tonga Football Association
- Confederation: OFC (Oceania)
- Head coach: (Tonga) Tiane Koaneti
- Most caps: Meleseini Tufui (12)
- Top scorer: Malia Tongia (5)
- Home stadium: Teufaiva Sport Stadium
- FIFA code: TGA
First colours	Second colours

FIFA ranking
- Current: 123 ▼1
- Highest: 53 (2005)
- Lowest: 123 (June 2017)

First international
- Tonga 0–11 Australia (Nuku'alofa, Tonga; 24 April 2002)

Biggest win
- Tonga 16–0 American Samoa (‘Atele, Tonga; 13 March 2025)

Biggest defeat
- Tonga 0–15 New Zealand (‘Atele, Tonga; 1 October 2015)

OFC U-20 Women's Championship
- Appearances: 8 (first in 2002)
- Best result: Second place (2006)

The Tonga women's national under-20 football team is the highest women's youth team of Tonga and is controlled by the Tonga Football Association.

== Information ==
=== Football in Tonga ===
Tonga's greatest football triumph to date at this age level was their triumph over Samoa and the Cook Islands in the first ever Polynesian Cup held in 1993. Although local players have not yet made their mark on big leagues abroad, the Tonga Football Association Chief Executive, Joe Topou, was appointed to the FIFA Executive Committee in 2002. The Tonga association is the only sports organization on the island that employs full-time administrative staff.

=== The second Goal project ===
Tonga's second Goal project will develop and improve the national football academy and the associations headquarters in Atele, Tongatapu, which was built in the country's first Goal project. This development work will ensure that all of the Tonga Football Associations needs are fully satisfied. Local matches will be held at the football academy, while the administration's requirements, including the needs of players, officials and spectators, will also be covered. The football school will be transformed into a House of Football.

== Records ==
=== OFC Championship Record ===
OFC U-20 Women's Championship
Year	Round	Pld	W	D	L	GF	GA	GD
(Tonga) 2002	Third Place	4	1	1	2	3	27	-24
(Papua New Guinea) 2004	Did not enter							
(Samoa) 2006	Second Place	5	3	0	2	9	17	-8
(New Zealand) 2010	Third Place	3	1	1	1	5	12	-7
(New Zealand) 2012	Did not enter							
(New Zealand) 2014	Third Place	3	1	0	2	5	7	-2
(Tonga) 2015	Fifth Place	4	0	2	2	7	23	-16
(New Zealand) 2017	Sixth Place	5	0	1	4	3	21	-18
(Cook Islands) 2019	Group stage	2	0	0	2	2	6	-4
(Fiji) 2023	Group stage	3	0	0	3	1	14	-13
Total	8/10	29	6	5	18	35	127	-92

== Current technical staff ==
Position	
Head coach	(Tonga) Lafaele Moala
Assistant Coach	(Tonga) Ofa Talasinga
Goalkeeper Coach	(Tonga) Motekiai Faupula
Team Manager	(Tonga) Manatu Liava'a
Team Doctor	(Tonga) Saia Faupula

== Current squad ==
The following players were called up for the 2019 OFC U-19 Women's Championship from 30 August–12 September in Avarua, the Cook Islands.

Caps and goals updated as of 6 September 2019, before the game against Papua New Guinea.

No.	Pos.	Player	Date of birth (age)	Caps	Goals	Club
1	GK	Kalolaine Topui	20 November 2001 (age 24)	0	0	(Tonga Football Association) Navutoka
18	GK	Carollyne Fotu	13 May 2002 (age 24)	2	0	(Tonga Football Association) Nukuhetulu
2	DF	Meleseini Tufui	20 February 2000 (age 26)	12	0	(Tonga Football Association) Veitongo
5	DF	Litea Taukapo	14 June 2002 (age 24)	1	0	(Tonga Football Association) Mangia
7	DF	Sanilaiti Holika	5 January 2002 (age 24)	1	0	(Tonga Football Association) Lavengatonga
13	DF	Siunipa Talasinga	11 April 2002 (age 24)	9	0	(Tonga Football Association) Veitongo
14	DF	Kalolaine Tonga	3 July 2002 (age 24)	1	0	(Tonga Football Association) Fasi & Afi
15	DF	Ana Lauteau	6 August 2002 (age 24)	1	0	(Tonga Football Association) Veitongo
17	DF	Patiola Tonga	15 December 2003 (age 22)	2	0	(Tonga Football Association) Veitongo
4	MF	Kalolaine Taliauli	22 February 2000 (age 26)	4	0	(Tonga Football Association) Fasi & Afi
9	MF	Lositika Feke	10 April 2003 (age 23)	2	1	(Tonga Football Association) Longolongo
10	MF	Ana Polovili	4 March 2002 (age 24)	2	1	(Tonga Football Association) Veitongo
11	DF	Mele Kafa	20 January 2002 (age 24)	6	2	(Tonga Football Association) Navutoka
12	MF	Mafa Pasikala	7 September 2003 (age 23)	1	0	(Tonga Football Association) Talafo'ou
16	MF	Finehika Finau	3 July 2002 (age 24)	2	0	(Tonga Football Association) Marist Prems
3	FW	Lupe Vaea	12 February 2004 (age 22)	2	0	(Tonga Football Association) Fasi & Afi
6	FW	Seini Tulangi	24 February 2003 (age 23)	1	0	(Tonga Football Association) Fahefa
8	FW	Florence Hakalo	8 October 2003 (age 23)	2	0	(Tonga Football Association) Fasi & Afi
