= 2002 OFC Women's Under 19 Qualifying Tournament =

Tournament details
- Host country: Tonga
- Dates: 23 April–3 May 2002
- Teams: 7 (from 1 confederation)
- Venue: 1 (in 1 host city)

Final positions
- Champions: Australia (1st title)
- Runners-up: New Zealand
- Third place: Tonga
- Fourth place: Samoa

Tournament statistics
- Matches played: 13
- Goals scored: 91 (7 per match)
- Top scorer: (New Zealand) Amber Hearn (10 goals)

The 2002 OFC Women's Under 19 Qualifying Tournament was the inaugural edition of what would later be known as the OFC U-20 Women's Championship, a biennial international football competition for women's under-20 national teams organised by Oceania Football Confederation. It was hosted by Tonga from 23 April–3 May 2002.

Players born on or after 1 January 1983 were eligible to participate in the competition.

In the final, Australia defeated New Zealand 6–0.

By winning the tournament, Australia also qualified for the 2002 FIFA U-19 Women's World Championship, the inaugural FIFA U-20 Women's World Cup, in Canada.

== Qualification ==
All members of the Oceania Football Confederation qualified automatically, however, Papua New Guinea and Vanuatu withdrew before the tournament began.

=== Participating teams ===
The following teams participated in the 2006 OFC U-20 Women's Championship tournament:

Country
American Samoa
Australia
Cook Islands
Fiji
New Zealand
Samoa
Tonga

== Group stage ==
=== Group A ===
Pos	Team	Pld	W	D	L	GF	GA	GD	Pts	Group stage result
1	New Zealand	3	3	0	0	20	0	+20	9	Advance to knockout stage
2	Samoa	3	1	1	1	4	13	−9	4	Advance to knockout stage
3	American Samoa	3	0	2	1	2	4	−2	2	
4	Fiji	3	0	1	2	1	10	−9	1	

Source: RSSSF
23 April 2002

American Samoa	0–0	Fiji
	Report

Nukuʻalofa
23 April 2002

New Zealand	10–0	Samoa
Clapham; Hearn; Meo; Duncan; Yallop; Ray	Report

Nukuʻalofa

25 April 2002

New Zealand	2–0	American Samoa
Duncan; Hearn	Report

Nukuʻalofa
25 April 2002

Samoa	2–1	Fiji
	Report

Nukuʻalofa

27 April 2002

New Zealand	8–0	Fiji
Duncan; Hearn; McColl; Ray; Thompson	Report

Nukuʻalofa
27 April 2002

Samoa	2–2	American Samoa
	Report

Nukuʻalofa

=== Group B ===
Pos	Team	Pld	W	D	L	GF	GA	GD	Pts	Group stage result
1	Australia	2	2	0	0	26	0	+26	6	Advance to knockout stage
2	Tonga (H)	2	0	1	1	1	12	−11	1	Advance to knockout stage
3	Cook Islands	2	0	1	1	1	16	−15	1	

Source: RSSSF
(H) Hosts
24 April 2002

Tonga	0–11	Australia
	Report	Crawford 5'; McCallum 19', 88'; Davison 22'; Munoz 28'; Kuralay 44', 50', 67'; Slatyer 51'; Neilson 63'; Stocco 75'

Nukuʻalofa

26 April 2002

Cook Islands	0–15	Australia
	Report	Gill 7', 10'; Cannuli 20', 34', 45', 72'; Davison 22'; Mitchell 28'; McShea 37', 62'; Slatyer 64'; Canham 74', 89'; Kuralay 82'; Harch 90'

Nukuʻalofa

28 April 2002

Cook Islands	1–1	Tonga
	Report

Nukuʻalofa

== Knockout stage ==
In the knockout stage, extra time and penalty shoot-out were used to decide the winner if necessary.

=== Bracket ===
Semi-finals
1 May
New Zealand	15
Tonga	0
1 May
Australia	13
Samoa	0

Final
3 May
New Zealand	0
Australia	6
Third place
3 May
Tonga	2
Samoa	0

=== Semi-finals ===
1 May 2002

New Zealand	15–0	Tonga
Hearn; Clapham; Thompson; Duncan; Meo; McColl; Yallop	Report

Nukuʻalofa

1 May 2002

Australia	13–0	Samoa
Davison 2'; McCallum 3'; Crawford 11', 14', 42'; Harch 19'; Kuralay 37', 58', 64', 70', 84'; Cannuli 74'; Gill 77'	Report

Nukuʻalofa

=== Third-place match ===
3 May 2002

Samoa	0–2	Tonga
	Report

Nukuʻalofa

=== Final ===
3 May 2002

Australia	6–0	New Zealand
Munoz 30', 70'; McCallum 36'; Crawford 56'; Davison 61', 78'	Report

Nukuʻalofa

== Top goalscorers ==
10 goals

- (New Zealand) Amber Hearn

9 goals

- (Australia) Selin Kuralay

6 goals

- (New Zealand) Sara Clapham
- (New Zealand) Priscilla Duncan

5 goals

- (Australia) Catherine Cannuli
- (Australia) Hayley Crawford
- (Australia) Emma Davison
