= 2014 OFC U-20 Women's Championship =

Tournament details
- Host country: New Zealand
- Dates: 18–22 February 2014
- Teams: 4 (from 1 confederation)
- Venue: (in 1 host city)

Final positions
- Champions: New Zealand (4th title)
- Runners-up: Papua New Guinea
- Third place: Tonga
- Fourth place: Vanuatu

Tournament statistics
- Matches played: 6
- Goals scored: 31 (5.17 per match)
- Top scorer: (New Zealand) Emma Rolston
- Best player: (Papua New Guinea) Meagen Gunemba
- Best goalkeeper: (Tonga) Tangimausia Ma’afu
- Fair play award: Vanuatu

The 2014 OFC U-20 Women's Championship was the sixth edition of the OFC U-20 Women's Championship. The continent's association football youth tournament organised by the Oceania Football Confederation. The tournament takes place in Auckland, New Zealand from 18 to 22 February 2014. Four teams take part.

The Championship acts as the continent's qualifying event for the 2014 FIFA U-20 Women's World Cup that will take place Canada later in this year.

Oceania's two top ranked teams New Zealand and Papua New Guinea won their first two games and then played of for the title on the last matchday. New Zealand won 3–0 and qualified to the World Cup.

== Participating teams ==
Only four of OFC's eleven nations have entered a team. The official draw was held on 24 January at OFC headquarters.

- New Zealand (Hosts)
- Papua New Guinea
- Tonga
- Vanuatu

== Format ==
The four teams played a round-robin. The winner advanced to the World Cup.

== Officials ==
Nine referees and nine assistant referees were named for the tournament.

Referees

- (American Samoa) Uinifareti Aliva
- (Vanuatu) Robinson Banga
- (New Zealand) Anna-Marie Keighley
- (Cook Islands) Tupou Patia
- (Fiji) Finau Vulivuli

Assistant Referees

- (Fiji) Lonisa Dilioni
- (Solomon Islands) Nagarita Jimmy
- (Tonga) Lata Kaumatule
- (New Zealand) Jacqui Stephenson
- (Samoa) Maria Salamasina
- (Papua New Guinea) Wanting Yagum

== Matches ==
All times are local, UTC+13:00 (New Zealand Daylight saving time)

Team	Pld	W	D	L	GF	GA	GD	Pts
New Zealand	3	3	0	0	18	1	+17	9
Papua New Guinea	3	2	0	1	8	3	+5	6
Tonga	3	1	0	2	5	7	−2	3
Vanuatu	3	0	0	3	0	20	−20	0

18 February 2014
13:00

Tonga	0–4	Papua New Guinea
	Report	Awele 51'; Irakau 66'; Gabong 71'; Niaman 75'

Centre Park, Māngere
Referee: Anna-Marie Keighley (New Zealand)
18 February 2014
16:00

New Zealand	12–0	Vanuatu
Puketapu 7', 18', 43'; Rolston 15', 20', 45', 73'; Dabner 21'; Palmer 36', 45'; Pereira 80'; O'Brien 81'	Report

Centre Park, Māngere
Referee: Finau Vulivuli (Fiji)

20 February 2014
13:00

Vanuatu	0–4	Papua New Guinea
	Report	Gunemba 5', 12', 16'; Kaikas 39'

Centre Park, Māngere
Referee: Finau Vulivuli (Fiji)
20 February 2014
16:00

New Zealand	3–1	Tonga
Cleverley 7'; O'Brien 39'; Bott 90+1'	Report	Cleverley 24' (o.g.)

Centre Park, Māngere
Referee: Robinson Banga (Vanuatu)

22 February 2014
13:00

Vanuatu	0–4	Tonga
	Report	Tongia 30', 45'; Tahitu'a 35'; Malekamu 54'

Centre Park, Māngere
Referee: Anna-Marie Keighley (New Zealand)
22 February 2014
16:00

New Zealand	3–0	Papua New Guinea
Van Noorden 10'; Pereira 86'; Morris 90+3' (o.g.)	Report

Centre Park, Māngere
Referee: Robinson Banga (Vanuatu)

== Awards ==
2014 OFC Women's Under-20 Championship winners

New Zealand
Fourth title

- Golden Ball (MVP): Meagen Gunemba (PNG)
- Golden Boot (Leading Scorer): Emma Rolston (NZL)
- Golden Gloves (Best Goalkeeper): Tangimausia Ma’afu (TON)
- Fair Play Award: Vanuatu

== Goal scorers ==
4 goals

- (New Zealand) Emma Rolston

3 goals

- (New Zealand) Martine Puketapu
- (Papua New Guinea) Meagen Gunemba

2 goals

- (New Zealand) Briar Palmer
- (New Zealand) Jasmine Pereira
- (New Zealand) Tayla O'Brien
- (Tonga) Malia Tongia

1 goal

- (New Zealand) Catherine Bott
- (New Zealand) Daisy Cleverley
- (New Zealand) Lauren Dabner
- (New Zealand) Belinda Van Noorden
- (Papua New Guinea) Dinna Awele
- (Papua New Guinea) Yvonne Gabong
- (Papua New Guinea) Talitha Irakau
- (Papua New Guinea) Georgina Kaikas
- (Papua New Guinea) Nicola Niaman
- (Tonga) Ilisapeti Malekamu
- (Tonga) Unaloto Tahitu'a

Own goal

- (New Zealand) Daisy Cleverley
- (Papua New Guinea) Rumona Morris
