= 2012 OFC Women's Under 20 Qualifying Tournament =

Tournament details
- Host country: New Zealand
- Dates: 10–14 April
- Teams: 4 (from 1 confederation)
- Venue: (in 1 host city)

Final positions
- Champions: New Zealand (3rd title)
- Runners-up: Papua New Guinea
- Third place: New Caledonia
- Fourth place: Samoa

Tournament statistics
- Matches played: 6
- Goals scored: 43 (7.17 per match)
- Top scorer: Rosie White (8 goals)

2012 OFC Women's Under 20 Qualifying Tournament was the 5th edition of OFC Women's Under 20 Qualifying Tournament. The tournament took place in Auckland, New Zealand from 10 to 14 April. It was initially scheduled to be played in Auckland, New Zealand from 16–20 January 2012, but was postponed by Oceania Football Confederation due to two late entries. The Championship acted as the continent's qualifying event for the 2012 FIFA U-20 Women's World Cup that will take place Japan later in this year.

The tournament was won by New Zealand, who qualified to the World Cup.

The tournament was held alongside the 2012 OFC Women's Under 17 Qualifying Tournament, using the same venue and alternating matchdays.

== Participating teams ==
- New Zealand (hosts)
- Papua New Guinea
- Samoa
- New Caledonia

== Format ==
The four teams played a round-robin. The winner advanced to the World Cup.

== Matches ==
Team	Pld	W	D	L	GF	GA	GD	Pts
New Zealand	3	3	0	0	28	1	+27	9
Papua New Guinea	3	1	1	1	5	9	−4	4
New Caledonia	3	1	0	2	8	15	−7	3
Samoa	3	0	1	2	2	18	−16	1

10 April 2012
13:00

New Caledonia	5–1	Samoa
Maguire 12', 42', 72'; Heutro 68', 82'	Report	Malo 38'

Centre Park, Mangere
10 April 2012
15:00

New Zealand	6–0	Papua New Guinea
Loye 11'; Millynn 19'; White 23', 49'; Carter 79'; Rood 90+3'	Report

Centre Park, Mangere

12 April 2012
13:00

New Caledonia	1–10	New Zealand
Heutro 28'	Report	Rood 11', 54'; Wilkinson 12', 65'; White 25', 39'; Loye 38', 42'; G. Brown 68', 81'

Centre Park, Mangere
12 April 2012
15:00

Papua New Guinea	1–1	Samoa
Birum 68'	Report	Mulipola 67'

Centre Park, Mangere

14 April 2012
13:00

Papua New Guinea	4–2	New Caledonia
Birum 9', 37'; Lose 54'; Gunemba 90+3'	Report	Cagous 10'; Heutro 21'

Centre Park, Mangere
14 April 2012
15:00

Samoa	0–12	New Zealand
	Report	Chance 5', 20', 82'; Skilton 12', 16'; Berger 26'; White 31', 49', 75' (pen.), 79'; Smallfield 71'; Wilkilson 90'

Centre Park, Mangere

== Top goalscorers ==
players with at least two goals

8 goals

- (New Zealand) Rosie White

4 goals

- (New Caledonia) Marie Heutro

3 goals

- (New Caledonia) Kim Maguire
- (New Zealand) Olivia Chance
- (New Zealand) Kate Loye
- (New Zealand) Katie Rood
- (New Zealand) Hannah Wilkinson
- (Papua New Guinea) Sandra Birum

2 goals

- (New Zealand) Georgia Brown
- (New Zealand) Stephanie Skilton

== Awards ==
New Zealand's White was handed the golden boot for scoring eight goals. New Zealand’s Erin Naylor received the golden gloves as best goalkeeper of the tournament. The golden ball for best player was handed to New Zealand's Kate Loye . New Caledonia received the Fair Play Award.
