= 2004 OFC Women's Under 19 Qualifying Tournament =

2004 OFC Women's U-20 Qualifying Tournament
Tournament details
- Dates: 20 April – 24 April
- Teams: 3 (from 1 confederation)
- Venue: 1 (in 1 host city)

Final positions
- Champions: Australia (2nd title)
- Runners-up: Papua New Guinea
- Third place: Solomon Islands

Tournament statistics
- Matches played: 3
- Goals scored: 28 (9.33 per match)
- Attendance: 6,488 (2,163 per match)
- Top scorer(s): (Australia) Leena Khamis (Australia) Selin Kuralay (5 goals)

The 2004 OFC Women's Under 19 Qualifying Tournament was the second staging of the OFC Women's U-20 Qualifying Tournament. The tournament was hosted by Papua New Guinea, with matches played between 20 and 24 April 2004.

Australia won their second title after defeating the other two competitors (Papua New Guinea and Solomon Islands) in a round robin.

== Venues ==
All matches were played at Lloyd Robson Oval in Port Moresby, Papua New Guinea.

Port Moresby
Lloyd Robson Oval
9°28′6″S 147°11′54″E
Capacity: 12,000

== Format ==
With three teams participating, the tournament was played as a round robin, with each team playing each other once. The top team qualified for the 2004 FIFA U-19 Women's World Championship

== Squads ==
There was a maximum squad size of 20 players for the tournament.

== Referees ==
- Michael Afu (Solomon Islands)
- Paul Lynch (Cook Islands)
- Jacqui Melksham (Australia)

== Matches ==
Teams were awarded three points for a win, one point for a draw and no points for a defeat.

Team	Pld	W	D	L	GF	GA	GD	Pts
Australia	2	2	0	0	27	1	+26	6
Papua New Guinea	2	0	1	1	1	14	−13	1
Solomon Islands	2	0	1	1	0	13	−13	1

20 April 2004

Papua New Guinea	0–0	Solomon Islands
	Report

Lloyd Robson Oval, Port Moresby
Attendance: 800
Referee: Jacqui Melksham (Australia)

22 April 2004
15:00

Australia	13–0	Solomon Islands
Kuralay 1', 61'; Khamis 4', 18', 32', 57', 76'; Ledbrook 27'; Tristram 35'; Shipard 38'; Blayney 39', 45+2'; Cartwright 56'	Report

Lloyd Robson Oval, Port Moresby
Attendance: 1,473
Referee: Paul Lynch (Cook Islands)

24 April 2004
15:00

Papua New Guinea	1–14	Australia
Limbai 69' (pen.)	Report	Blayney 11', 90+5'; Reed 21'; Ledbrook 27', 45', 51'; Hilder 30'; Kuralay 35', 36', 49'; Cartwright 40'; Shipard 43'; Tristram 73', 78'

Lloyd Robson Oval, Port Moresby
Attendance: 4,215
Referee: Michael Afu (Solomon Islands)

== Goalscorers ==
5 goals

- (Australia) Leena Khamis
- (Australia) Selin Kuralay

4 goals

- (Australia) Leah Blayney
- (Australia) Kylie Ledbrook

3 goals

- (Australia) Jenna Tristram

2 goals

- (Australia) Renee Cartwright
- (Australia) Sally Shipard

1 goal

- (Australia) Katie Hilder
- (Australia) Alannah Reed
- (Papua New Guinea) Neilen Limbai
