= Colombia women's national under-20 football team =

National association football team

Colombia
- Nickname(s): Las Cafeteras (The Coffee Growers); Las Chicas Superpoderosas (The Powerpuff Girls)
- Association: Federación Colombiana de Fútbol (FCF)
- Confederation: CONMEBOL (South America)
- Head coach: Carlos Alberto Quintero
- Home stadium: Estadio Metropolitano Roberto Meléndez
- FIFA code: COL
First colours	Second colours

First international
- Ecuador 2–1 Colombia (Caracas, Venezuela; 13 May 2004)

Biggest win
- Colombia 9–0 Peru (Riobamba, Ecuador; 17 January 2018)

Biggest defeat
- Colombia 0–6 Brazil (Fray Bentos, Uruguay; 28 January 2014)

South American Under-20 Women's Football Championship
- Appearances: 11 (first in 2004)
- Best result: Runners-up (2010, 2022)

FIFA U-20 Women's World Cup
- Appearances: 4 (first in 2010)
- Best result: Third place (2026)
Medal record
FIFA U-20 Women's World Cup
Bronze medal – third place	2026 Poland	Team
South American Games
Silver medal – second place	2018 Cochabamba	Team
Bronze medal – third place	2022 Asunción	Team
Bolivarian Games
Gold medal – first place	2013 Trujillo	Team
Gold medal – first place	2017 Santa Marta	Team

The Colombia women's national under-20 football team represents Colombia in international women's football at under-20 competitions and are controlled by the Colombian Football Federation. They are a member of the CONMEBOL.

== Competitive record ==
*Draws include knockout matches decided on penalty kicks. **Gold background colour indicates that the tournament was won. ***Red border colour indicates tournament was held on home soil.

Champions Runners-up Third Place Fourth place

=== FIFA U-20 Women's World Cup ===
Year	Result	Pld	W	D*	L	GF	GA
(Canada) 2002	Did not enter						
(Thailand) 2004	Did not qualify						
(Russia) 2006	Did not qualify						
(Chile) 2008	Did not qualify						
(Germany) 2010	Fourth place	6	2	1	3	7	6
(Japan) 2012	Did not qualify						
(Canada) 2014	Did not qualify						
(Papua New Guinea) 2016	Did not qualify						
(France) 2018	Did not qualify						
(Costa Rica) 2022	Quarter-finals	4	1	2	1	3	3
(Colombia) 2024	Quarter-finals	5	4	1	0	7	2
(Poland) 2026	Third place	7	3	2	2	6	8
Total	4/12	22	10	6	6	23	19

* Draws include knockout matches decided via penalty shoot-out.

=== South American Under-20 Women's Football Championship ===
Year	Round	Position	Pld	W	D*	L	GF	GA
(Brazil) 2004	First stage	5th	2	1	0	1	4	2
(Chile) 2006	First stage	5th	4	2	0	2	10	8
(Brazil) 2008	First stage	5th	4	2	1	1	7	5
(Colombia) 2010	Runners-up	2nd	6	5	0	1	10	5
(Brazil) 2012	Third place	3rd	7	4	0	3	10	8
(Uruguay) 2014	Third place	3rd	7	3	2	2	9	9
(Brazil) 2015	Third place	3rd	7	2	3	2	8	4
(Ecuador) 2018	Third place	3rd	7	4	0	3	21	16
(Argentina) 2020	Cancelled due to COVID-19 pandemic in South America							
(Chile) 2022	Runners-up	2nd	7	4	2	1	13	4
(Ecuador) 2024	Third place	3rd	9	6	2	1	17	7
(Paraguay) 2026	Fourth place	4th	9	3	3	3	6	6
Total	Runners-up	11/11	62	34	10	18	107	70

=== Bolivarian Games ===
Bolivarian Games record
Year	Result	Pld	W	D*	L	GF	GA
2005 to 2009	Senior Team Tournament						
(Peru) 2013	Gold Medal	5	4	1	0	11	5
(Colombia) 2017	Gold Medal	4	4	1	0	20	2
(Colombia) 2022	Gold Medal	3	3	0	0	11	1
Total	3/11	12	11	2	0	42	188

== Head-to-head record ==
The following table shows Colombia's head-to-head record in the FIFA U-20 Women's World Cup.

Opponent	Pld	W	D	L	GF	GA	GD	Win %
Australia	1	1	0	0	2	0	+2	100.00
Brazil	1	0	0	1	0	1	−1	0.00
Cameroon	1	1	0	0	1	0	+1	100.00
Costa Rica	2	2	0	0	6	1	+5	100.00
France	1	0	1	0	1	1	+0	0.00
Germany	2	1	0	1	2	3	−1	50.00
Italy	1	0	1	0	1	1	+0	0.00
Mexico	2	1	1	0	1	0	+1	50.00
Netherlands	1	0	1	0	2	2	+0	0.00
New Zealand	1	0	1	0	2	2	+0	0.00
Nigeria	2	1	0	1	1	1	+0	50.00
North Korea	2	0	0	2	0	6	−6	0.00
Poland	1	1	0	0	1	0	+1	100.00
Portugal	1	0	1	0	0	0	+0	0.00
South Korea	2	1	0	1	1	1	+0	50.00
Sweden	1	1	0	0	2	0	+2	100.00
Total	22	10	6	6	23	19	+4	45.45

== Fixtures and results ==
Legend

Win Draw Loss Fixture

=== 2025 ===
17 December Friendly	Argentina	1–0	Colombia	Estadio Lionel Messi de Ezeiza, Ezeiza
13:00	Núñez 90'	Report

19 December Friendly	Argentina	1–0	Colombia	Estadio Lionel Messi de Ezeiza, Ezeiza
13:00	Núñez 90'	Report

=== 2026 ===
12 December Friendly	United States	0–1	Colombia	Arthur M. Blank U.S. Soccer National Training Center, Fayetteville
17:00		Report	Silva 22'

15 December Friendly	England	0–0 (5–4 p)	Colombia	Arthur M. Blank U.S. Soccer National Training Center, Fayetteville
10:00		Report

7 September World Cup GS	Costa Rica	1–3	Colombia	Stadion Miejski ŁKS Łódź, Łódź
18:00	Scott 6'	Report	Viáfara 26' (pen.); Silva 56'; Cortés 80'	Attendance: 358; Referee: Kim Yu-jeong (South Korea)

10 September World Cup GS	Colombia	0–0	Portugal	Stadion Miejski ŁKS Łódź, Łódź
18:00		Report		Attendance: 444; Referee: Emma Kocbek (Australia)

13 September World Cup GS	Colombia	0–3	North Korea	Stadion Miejski ŁKS Łódź, Łódź
18:00		Report	Choe Rim-jong 11'; Choe Yon-a 81' (pen.), 85' (pen.)	Attendance: 732; Referee: Maria Sole Ferrieri Caputi (Italy)

17 September World Cup R16	Poland	0–1	Colombia	Stadion Miejski Bielsko-Biała, Bielsko-Biała
18:30		Report	Bartczak 89' (o.g.)	Attendance: 5,026; Referee: Casey Reibelt (Australia)

20 September World Cup QF	Nigeria	0–1	Colombia	Stadion Miejski ŁKS Łódź, Łódź
15:00		Report	Loboa 90+2'	Attendance: 1,325; Referee: Marianela Araya (Costa Rica)

23 September World Cup SF	North Korea	3–0	Colombia	Stadion Miejski ŁKS Łódź, Łódź
18:30	Pak Ok-I 28'; Choe Rim-jong 35'; So Ryu-gyong 47'	Report		Attendance: 972; Referee: Casey Reibelt (Australia)

26 September World Cup 3rd place	Italy	1–1 (a.e.t.) (3–4 p)	Colombia	Stadion Miejski ŁKS Łódź, Łódź
18:00	Pellegrino Cimò 43'	Report	Cabezas 62'	Attendance: 1,205; Referee: Lizzet García (Mexico)
	Penalties
	Langella (penalty scored); Fadda (penalty scored); Ventriglia (penalty scored); Bressan (penalty missed); Gallo (penalty missed); Venturelli (penalty missed)		(penalty missed) Viáfara; (penalty scored) Loboa; (penalty scored) Torres; (penalty missed) Arboleda; (penalty scored) Cortés; (penalty scored) Martínez

== Current squad ==
The following 23 players were named for the 2026 FIFA U-20 Women's World Cup.

No.	Pos.	Player	Date of birth (age)	Caps	Goals	Club
1	GK	Luisa Agudelo	27 March 2007 (aged 19)	0	0	(United States Soccer Federation) San Diego Wave
2	DF	Sara Bohórquez	30 October 2006 (aged 19)	0	0	(Colombian Football Federation) Fortaleza
3	DF	Lina Arboleda	5 August 2006 (aged 20)	0	0	(Colombian Football Federation) Millonarios
4	DF	Mercedes Martinez	15 August 2007 (aged 19)	0	0	(Colombian Football Federation) Fortaleza
5	DF	Maria Torres	1 September 2006 (aged 20)	0	0	(Colombian Football Federation) Independiente Medellín
6	MF	Brenda Cardona	26 October 2008 (aged 17)	0	0	(Colombian Football Federation) Independiente Santa Fe
7	MF	Isabella Diaz	17 November 2007 (aged 18)	0	0	(Colombian Football Federation) Independiente Santa Fe
8	MF	Mariana Mosquera	18 April 2007 (aged 19)	0	0	(Colombian Football Federation) Atlético Nacional
9	FW	Valerin Loboa	3 July 2007 (aged 19)	0	0	(United States Soccer Federation) Portland Thorns
10	MF	Mariana Silva	21 August 2007 (aged 19)	0	0	(Royal Spanish Football Federation) Madrid CFF
11	FW	Maithe Lopez	24 January 2007 (aged 19)	0	0	(Canadian Soccer Association) Vancouver Rise
12	GK	Jimena Ospina	26 October 2006 (aged 19)	0	0	(Colombian Football Federation) Cortuluá
13	MF	Isabel Weiner	6 February 2007 (aged 19)	0	0	(United States Soccer Federation) Columbia Lions
14	DF	Fernanda Viafara	22 July 2006 (aged 20)	0	0	(Colombian Football Federation) Millonarios
15	DF	Samantha Rodriguez	8 October 2007 (aged 18)	0	0	(Colombian Football Federation) Atlético Bucaramanga
16	MF	Juana Ortegón	6 August 2006 (aged 20)	0	0	(Colombian Football Federation) Independiente Santa Fe
17	DF	Alejandra Baldovino	15 December 2008 (aged 17)	0	0	(Colombian Football Federation) Junior
18	MF	Catalina Cortes	27 May 2006 (aged 20)	0	0	(Colombian Football Federation) América de Cali
19	DF	Sintia Cabezas	1 May 2006 (aged 20)	0	0	(French Football Federation) Marseille
20	DF	Sofia Ortiz	10 May 2008 (aged 18)	0	0	(Colombian Football Federation) América de Cali
21	GK	Saray Marin	26 January 2007 (aged 19)	0	0	(Colombian Football Federation) América de Cali

== Honours ==
- FIFA U-20 Women's World Cup:
  - Third place (1): 2026
- South American Under-20 Women's Football Championship
  - Runners-up (2): 2010, 2022
  - Third place (5): 2012, 2014, 2015, 2018, 2024
- Bolivarian Games
  - Winners (3): 2013 Trujillo, 2017 Santa Marta, 2022 Valledupar
- South American Games
  - Runners-up (1): 2018 Cochabamba
  - Third place (1): 2022 Asunción
