= Luisa Agudelo =

Colombian footballer (born 2007)

- Agudelo with the San Diego Wave in 2026

Personal information
- Full name: Luisa Fernanda Agudelo Morelo
- Date of birth: 27 March 2007 (age 19)
- Place of birth: Cali, Colombia
- Height: 1.73 m (5 ft 8 in)
- Position: Goalkeeper

Team information
- Current team: San Diego Wave
- Number: 1

Senior career*
Years	Team	Apps	(Gls)
2021	Generaciones Palmiranas		(0)
2022	Cortuluá		(0)
2023–2025	Deportivo Cali	38	(0)
2026–	San Diego Wave	3	(0)

International career^{‡}
2022–2025	Colombia U17	9	(0)
2024–	Colombia U20	13	(0)
2021–	Colombia	2	(0)
Medal record
Women's football
Representing Colombia
Copa América Femenina
Runner-up	2025 Ecuador
FIFA U-20 Women's World Cup
Third place	2026 Poland
FIFA U-17 Women's World Cup
Runner-up	2022 India
- * Club domestic league appearances and goals as of 16:37, 15 November 2026 (UTC) ‡ National team caps and goals as of 25 July 2025

Luisa Fernanda Agudelo Morelo (born 27 March 2007) is a Colombian professional footballer who plays as a goalkeeper for San Diego Wave FC of the National Women's Soccer League (NWSL) and the Colombia national team.

She made her professional debut for Cortuluá during the 2022 Liga Femenina season at the age of 15 before joining Deportivo Cali in 2023. She became Cali's first-choice goalkeeper and helped the club win consecutive Liga Femenina titles in 2024 and 2025, saving a penalty in the 2025 final to secure the championship. In January 2026, Agudelo signed a contract with San Diego Wave of the NWSL through the 2028 season.

Agudelo made her international debut for Colombia's youth teams and was part of the squad that finished runners-up at the 2022 FIFA U-17 Women's World Cup. She also represented Colombia at the 2024 and 2026 editions of the FIFA U-20 Women's World Cup. At the 2026 tournament in Poland, she helped Colombia reach the semi-finals and then won the bronze-medal match against Italy on penalties, saving two attempts in the shoot-out.

== Early life ==
Agudelo was born in Cali, in Colombia's Valle del Cauca department. She first became involved in sport through roller skating, which she began at the age of seven after being encouraged by one of her teachers. She won a championship in the sport before turning her attention to football. She began playing football at the age of eight after being asked to take part in a friendly match involving her older sister, Sheila. Agudelo initially played as a forward before moving into defence. She later recalled that teammates mocked her performances in both positions, contributing to her decision to try goalkeeping after her father suggested that she play in goal. Agudelo began training at the Balón de Oro football school near her home. By the age of nine, she was reportedly training for approximately two hours each day while continuing her studies. She was initially one of the youngest players in her local football environment and often competed against boys before moving into more structured girls' football.

At the age of 10, Agudelo received her first call-up to the Valle del Cauca regional selection. She initially served as a reserve goalkeeper, reportedly ranking fifth among the team's goalkeepers, but the experience provided her with an early opportunity to train in a representative programme. She subsequently joined Sportings Club de Cali, where she continued her development in a girls' team and gained greater experience as a goalkeeper. She later entered the youth structure of Cortuluá, the club with which she began her transition towards senior football. As part of her specialist training, Agudelo also worked with the Escuela Carlos Sarmiento Lora and the goalkeeper-development school Guardianes del Arco. Her early training in those programmes helped establish the technical foundation of her game before she entered professional football. Agudelo's development was interrupted by a bone contusion in her hip, which kept her away from football for approximately a year and a half. After returning to training, she continued her progression through the Colombian women's football system and eventually made her senior debut for Cortuluá in 2022.

== Club career ==
=== Cortuluá ===
Agudelo made her professional debut for Cortuluá during the 2022 Liga Femenina season at the age of 15. Her debut came during the same year in which she represented Colombia at the 2022 FIFA U-17 Women's World Cup, making her one of the youngest goalkeepers to appear in the Colombian top flight. After progressing through youth football in the Valle del Cauca region, she was promoted to Cortuluá's senior squad and began gaining experience against established professional players.

=== Deportivo Cali ===
Agudelo joined Deportivo Cali in 2023, still aged 15, and quickly competed for the starting goalkeeper position. She made 38 regular-season league appearances for the club and developed into one of the youngest regular starters in the Liga Femenina. In her second season, Agudelo helped Deportivo Cali win the 2024 Liga Femenina title. The championship was the first of consecutive league titles for Cali and marked Agudelo's emergence from promising youth goalkeeper to an important senior player. Her performances also strengthened her position within the Colombian national-team setup, where she continued to compete in major youth tournaments.

Agudelo remained Cali's principal goalkeeper during the 2025 season. She recorded nine clean sheets and a reported save percentage of 86.9, while sharing some match duties with Andrea Vera. Agudelo played 17 of Cali's 26 league matches, and the two goalkeepers combined to help the club finish the campaign with the league's strongest defensive record, conceding 13 goals. Cali faced Independiente Santa Fe in the 2025 championship final. Santa Fe won the first leg 1–0, but Cali equalised the aggregate score by winning the return leg 1–0 at the Estadio Deportivo Cali in Palmaseca. Agudelo kept a clean sheet in the second leg, making important saves during the match and helping force the final to a penalty shoot-out. In the shoot-out, Agudelo saved Santa Fe's opening penalty, taken by Mariana Zamorano. She had spoken to Zamorano before the kick and correctly anticipated the direction of the attempt. Cali converted all five of its penalties and won the shoot-out 5–4, securing its second consecutive Liga Femenina championship. The save made Agudelo the decisive performer of the final and drew widespread attention in Colombian and international media.

After the final, Agudelo said that she had felt confident playing the shoot-out at home because of the support from the Cali supporters. She explained that she had expected to save one or two penalties and was pleased that the save contributed to the title alongside the successful efforts of her teammates. Agudelo left Deportivo Cali after the 2025 season having helped the club win consecutive league championships. During her time with Cali, she made 38 regular-season appearances and established herself as one of the most prominent young goalkeepers in Colombian football.

=== San Diego Wave ===
Agudelo with the San Diego Wave in August 2026

On 26 January 2026, Agudelo joined San Diego Wave FC of the National Women's Soccer League (NWSL) on a contract through the 2028 season. She joined San Diego as part of a rebuilt goalkeeping group alongside DiDi Haračić and Leah Freeman following the departure of Kailen Sheridan, who had been the club's starting goalkeeper since its inaugural season. After spending the first few months of the season as a backup behind Haračić and Freeman, she made her NWSL debut on 4 July, making four saves in a home cleansheet victory over Gotham FC. Her debut was praised by teammates and local media, including Trinity Armstrong, who described Agudelo as a hard worker and who had had taken advantage of her opportunity after working for several months to earn her first start. She made two more appearances in her debut season with San Diego.

== International career ==
=== Youth ===
Agudelo was Colombia's goalkeeper at the 2022 FIFA U-17 Women's World Cup in India, aged 15. In the semi-final against Nigeria she saved a penalty in the shootout to send Colombia into its first final at a FIFA tournament, which Spain won 1–0.

At 17, Agudelo was the youngest member of Colombia's squad for the 2024 FIFA U-20 Women's World Cup, held in Colombia, and kept goal as the team reached the quarter-finals, where it lost to the Netherlands on penalties.

Colombia qualified for the 2026 FIFA U-20 Women's World Cup through the 2026 South American Under-20 Women's Football Championship, held in Paraguay. The team finished fourth in the final six-team group, behind Brazil, Ecuador and Argentina, with the result securing one of South America's places at the world championship.

On 21 August 2026, head coach Carlos Paniagua named Agudelo in Colombia's 21-player squad for the 2026 FIFA U-20 Women's World Cup in Poland. As Colombia's first-choice goalkeeper, she played a central role in the team's run to the semi-finals. She kept a clean sheet in the quarter-final against Nigeria and was named the match's Visa Player of the Match by FIFA. Colombia finished the tournament in third place after defeating Italy in the bronze-medal match. The match ended 1–1 after extra time before Colombia won the penalty shoot-out 4–3, with Agudelo saving two of Italy's attempts. She was named the Visa Player of the Match and became the principal figure in Colombia's first top-three finish at the FIFA U-20 Women's World Cup.

=== Senior ===
Agudelo was called into Colombia's 23-player squad for the 2025 Copa América Femenina in Quito, Ecuador, following an injury to Natalia Giraldo. She did not appear in the tournament, in which Colombia finished as runners-up.

== Honours ==
Deportivo Cali

- Colombian Women's Football League: 2024, 2025

Colombia U17

- FIFA U-17 Women's World Cup runner-up: 2022

Colombia U20

- FIFA U-20 Women's World Cup third place: 2026

Colombia

- Copa América Femenina runner-up: 2025
