= 2010 OFC Women's Under 20 Qualifying Tournament =

Tournament details
- Host country: New Zealand
- Dates: 21–25 January
- Teams: 4 (from 1 confederation)
- Venue: 1 (in 1 host city)

Final positions
- Champions: New Zealand (2nd title)
- Runners-up: Cook Islands
- Third place: Tonga
- Fourth place: American Samoa

Tournament statistics
- Matches played: 6
- Goals scored: 37 (6.17 per match)
- Top scorer(s): (New Zealand) Rosie White (9 goals)

The 2010 OFC Women's Under 20 Qualifying Tournament was an association football tournament held in New Zealand from 21 to 25 January 2010. Four teams entered the continent's tournament that served as a qualifier to the 2010 FIFA U-20 Women's World Cup. All matches were played in the North Harbour Stadium in Auckland. New Zealand won the tournament with zero goals against.

== Matches ==
| Nation | Pts | Pld | W | D | L | GF | GA | GD |
|---|---|---|---|---|---|---|---|---|
| New Zealand | 9 | 3 | 3 | 0 | 0 | 27 | 0 | +27 |
| Cook Islands | 4 | 3 | 1 | 1 | 1 | 5 | 9 | −4 |
| Tonga | 4 | 3 | 1 | 1 | 1 | 5 | 12 | −7 |
| American Samoa | 0 | 3 | 0 | 0 | 3 | 0 | 16 | −16 |

2010-01-21

| New Zealand | 8–0 | American Samoa |
|---|---|---|
| Hannah Wilkinson 16', 21', 81'; Rosie White 25', 52'; Annalie Longo 42'; Briony Fisher 45+2', 64' |

North Harbour Stadium
2010-01-21

| Cook Islands | 1–1 | Tonga |
|---|---|---|
| Regina Mustonen 16' | | Heilala Loto'anui 72' |

North Harbour Stadium

2010-01-23

| Tonga | 4–0 | American Samoa |
|---|---|---|
| Penateti Feke 11', 38' (pen.), 90+4'; Heilala Loto'anui 88' |

North Harbour Stadium
2010-01-23

| New Zealand | 8–0 | Cook Islands |
|---|---|---|
| Elise Mamanu-Gray 36'; Rosie White 37', 41'; Hannah Wilkinson 57'; Liz Milne 59', 89'; Hannah Wall 66', 68' |

North Harbour Stadium

2010-01-25

| American Samoa | 0–4 | Cook Islands |
|---|---|---|
| | | Regina Mustonen 25', 32', 44', 89' |

North Harbour Stadium
2010-01-25

| Tonga | 0–11 | New Zealand |
|---|---|---|
| | | Rosie White 3', 10', 30', 43', 49'; Nadia Pearl 13'; Lauren Mathis 19'; Hannah Wilkinson 35'; Chelsey Wood 41'; Elise Mamanu-Gray 79'; Sarah McLaughlin 89' |

North Harbour Stadium
