= 2026 FIFA U-20 Women's World Cup =

Mistrzostwa Świata FIFA U-20 Kobiet Polska 2026
- Nowe gwiazdy na horyzoncie (Stars in the making)

Tournament details
- Host country: Poland
- Dates: 5–27 September
- Teams: 24 (from 6 confederations)
- Venues: 4 (in 4 host cities)

Final positions
- Champions: Spain (2nd title)
- Runners-up: North Korea
- Third place: Colombia
- Fourth place: Italy

Tournament statistics
- Matches played: 52
- Goals scored: 181 (3.48 per match)
- Attendance: 37,307 (717 per match)
- Top scorer(s): (Spain) Pau Comendador (6 goals)
- Best player: (Spain) Rosalía Domínguez
- Best goalkeeper: (Spain) Laia López
- Fair play award: United States

The 2026 FIFA U-20 Women's World Cup (Polish: Mistrzostwa Świata FIFA U-20 Kobiet Polska 2026) was the 12th edition of the FIFA U-20 Women's World Cup, the biennial international women's youth football championship contested by the under-20 national teams of the member associations of FIFA. It was hosted by Poland. It was the second time that Poland had hosted a FIFA tournament, having hosted the men's FIFA U-20 World Cup in 2019. It was the first time that Poland had hosted a FIFA women's tournament.

Spain were crowned champions, their second title in this tournament. North Korea were the defending champions, having won a joint-record third title in 2024, but lost to Spain in the final. Colombia defeated Italy in the bronze medal match to claim their first medal at the tournament.

== Host selection ==
Poland were announced as the 2026 Women's U-20 World Cup hosts following the FIFA Council meeting on 17 December 2023 in Jeddah, Saudi Arabia.

== Teams ==
=== Qualification ===
Teams qualified Teams failed to qualify Teams withdrew or suspended Did not enter Not a FIFA member

A total of 24 teams qualified for the final tournament. In addition to Poland, who qualified automatically as hosts, the other 23 teams qualified from six separate continental competitions. The slot allocation remained unchanged from the previous edition.

- AFC (Asia): 4 slots
- CAF (Africa): 4 slots
- CONCACAF (North, Central America and Caribbean): 4 slots
- CONMEBOL (South America): 4 slots
- OFC (Oceania): 2 slots
- UEFA (Europe): 6 slots (including hosts Poland)

The host nation Poland, along with Portugal, New Caledonia, Ecuador, Tanzania and Benin made their debut at the U-20 Women's World Cup, with New Caledonia and Benin also making their first appearance in a FIFA women's tournament.

For the first time ever Germany failed to qualify, having participated in all editions until 2024.

Qualifying tournament	Team	Qualification date	Appearance(s)				Previous best performance
Qualifying tournament	Team	Qualification date	Total	First	Last	Streak	Previous best performance
2026 AFC U-20 Women's Asian Cup	China	11 April 2026	7th	2004	2018	1	Runners-up (2004, 2006)
2026 AFC U-20 Women's Asian Cup	Japan	11 April 2026	9th	2002	2024	5	Champions (2018)
2026 AFC U-20 Women's Asian Cup	North Korea	12 April 2026	9th	2006	2024	2	Champions (2006, 2016, 2024)
2026 AFC U-20 Women's Asian Cup	South Korea	12 April 2026	8th	2004	2024	3	Third place (2010)
2026 African U-20 Women's World Cup qualification	Ghana	9 May 2026	8th	2010	2024	8	Group stage (seven times) (Note: Ghana played in the group stages in 2010, 2012, 2014, 2016, 2018, 2022 and 2024.)
2026 African U-20 Women's World Cup qualification	Nigeria	9 May 2026	12th	2002	2024	12	Runners-up (2010, 2014)
2026 African U-20 Women's World Cup qualification	Benin	10 May 2026	1st	Debut			
2026 African U-20 Women's World Cup qualification	Tanzania	10 May 2026	1st	Debut			
2025 CONCACAF Women's U-20 Championship	Canada	31 May 2025	10th	2002	2024	3	Runners-up (2002)
2025 CONCACAF Women's U-20 Championship	Mexico	31 May 2025	11th	2002	2024	10	Quarter-finals (2010, 2012, 2016, 2022)
2025 CONCACAF Women's U-20 Championship	United States	1 June 2025	12th	2002	2024	12	Champions (2002, 2008, 2012)
2025 CONCACAF Women's U-20 Championship	Costa Rica	3 June 2025	5th	2010	2024	3	Group stage (2010, 2014, 2022, 2024)
2026 South American U-20 Women's Championship	Brazil	22 February 2026	12th	2002	2024	12	Third place (2006, 2022)
2026 South American U-20 Women's Championship	Ecuador	22 February 2026	1st	Debut			
2026 South American U-20 Women's Championship	Argentina	28 February 2026	5th	2006	2024	2	Round of 16 (2024)
2026 South American U-20 Women's Championship	Colombia	28 February 2026	4th	2010	2024	3	Fourth place (2010)
2025 OFC U-19 Women's Championship	New Caledonia	1 October 2025	1st	Debut			
2025 OFC U-19 Women's Championship	New Zealand	1 October 2025	10th	2006	2024	10	Quarter-finals (2014)
Host nation	Poland	17 December 2023	1st	Debut			
2025 UEFA Women's U-19 Championship	France	18 June 2025	10th	2002	2024	6	Runners-up (2016)
2025 UEFA Women's U-19 Championship	Italy	18 June 2025	3rd	2004	2012	1	Group stage (2004, 2012)
2025 UEFA Women's U-19 Championship	England	21 June 2025	6th	2002	2018	1	Third place (2018)
2025 UEFA Women's U-19 Championship	Portugal	21 June 2025	1st	Debut			
2025 UEFA Women's U-19 Championship	Spain	21 June 2025	6th	2004	2024	5	Champions (2022)

=== Draw ===
The draw took place on 15 May 2026 at the EC1 Cultural Center in Łódź, Poland. The 24 teams were divided into four pots of 6, with hosts Poland automatically placed in Pot 1. The remaining teams were allocated according to a ranking based on performances in the last five editions of the FIFA U-20 Women's World Cup, with greater weight given to more recent tournaments.

Teams from Pots 1 to 4 were drawn into Groups A to F, with each pot emptied before moving to the next. Poland were assigned to position A1, while the remaining Pot 1 teams automatically occupied position 1 in Groups B to F.

For each draw, a team ball was drawn first, followed by a group-position ball determining its placement within the group. FIFA's general principle is to, whenever possible, avoid having more than one team from the same confederation in the same group.

Pots
Pot	Team	Confederation	2014	2016	2018	2022	2024	Total points
Pot	Team	Confederation	Points (20%)	Points (40%)	Points (60%)	Points (80%)	Points (100%)	Total points
1	Poland (H)	UEFA	Host nation, automatically assigned to Pot 1					
1	Japan	AFC	DNQ	4.8	9	10.4	18	42.2
1	Spain	UEFA	DNQ	2.4	7.8	12.8	12	35
1	North Korea	AFC	1.4	7.2	3.6	W	21	33.2
1	Brazil	CONMEBOL	0.2	1.6	0.6	10.4	12	24.8
1	France	UEFA	2.6	4.4	6.6	5.6	4	23.2
2	United States	CONCACAF	1.4	3.2	2.4	2.4	13	22.4
2	Nigeria	CAF	2.6	2.4	2.4	7.2	6	20.6
2	Colombia	CONMEBOL	DNQ	DNQ	DNQ	4	13	17
2	Mexico	CONCACAF	0.4	2.4	1.8	4	4	12.6
2	South Korea	AFC	1	1.2	DNQ	2.4	4	8.6
2	England	UEFA	0.4	DNQ	6.6	DNQ	DNQ	7
3	Ghana	CAF	1.2	0.8	1.8	0	3	6.8
3	Canada	CONCACAF	1.2	0	DNQ	0	4	5.2
3	New Zealand	OFC	1.2	1.2	0.6	1.6	0	4.6
3	Argentina	CONMEBOL	DNQ	DNQ	DNQ	DNQ	4	4
3	China	AFC	0.4	DNQ	2.4	DNQ	DNQ	2.8
3	Costa Rica	CONCACAF	0	DNQ	DNQ	0	0	0 (Note: Tied on Points, ranked based on the ranking point result for the whole of the respective confederation from the most recent edition.)
4	Italy	UEFA	DNQ	DNQ	DNQ	DNQ	DNQ	0
4	Portugal	UEFA	DNQ	DNQ	DNQ	DNQ	DNQ	0
4	Ecuador	CONMEBOL	DNQ	DNQ	DNQ	DNQ	DNQ	0
4	Benin	CAF	DNE	DNE	DNE	DNQ	DNQ	0
4	Tanzania	CAF	DNQ	DNQ	DNQ	DNQ	DNQ	0
4	New Caledonia	OFC	DNE	DNQ	DNQ	DNQ	DNQ	0

== Venues ==
Łódź, Katowice, Sosnowiec, and Bielsko-Biała were the cities nominated to host the competition on 8 May 2025. The official venues were announced by FIFA in 6 September 2025.

Location of the host cities of the FIFA U-20 Women's World Cup Poland.

- 1 Łódź
- 2 Katowice
- 3 Sosnowiec
- 4 Bielsko-Biała

2026 FIFA U-20 Women's World Cup venues
Łódź	Katowice
Stadion ŁKS	Arena Katowice
Capacity: 18,029	Capacity: 15,048
Sosnowiec	Bielsko-Biała
Zagłębie Sports Park	Stadion w Bielsku-Białej
Capacity: 11,600	Capacity: 15,316

== Marketing ==
=== Emblem ===
The official emblem was revealed on 6 September 2025.

=== Theme song ===
The competition's official song is titled "Yeyeyo" and is performed by Blanka. The song was released on 7 August 2026.

=== Mascot ===
Islana

The tournament's mascot is called "Islana". The mascot represented spirits from Slavic mythology and was shaped after a rusalka. It was unveiled on 5 May 2026.

== Squads ==
Players born between 1 January 2006 and 31 December 2010 were eligible to compete in the tournament.

== Match officials ==
On 23 June 2026, FIFA confirmed that a total of 68 match officials had been appointed for the competition: 18 referees, 36 assistant referees and 14 video match officials.

Confederation	Referee	Assistant referees	Video assistant referees
AFC	(Japan) Asaka Koizumi	(India) Riiohlang Dhar (United Arab Emirates) Amal Badhafari	(Thailand) Sivakorn Pu-udom
AFC	(Australia) Casey Reibelt	(Australia) Emma Kocbek (Australia) Madelaine Allum	(Thailand) Sivakorn Pu-udom
AFC	(South Korea) Kim Yu-jeong	(Palestine) Heba Saadia (Thailand) Supawan Hinthong	(Thailand) Sivakorn Pu-udom
CAF	(Uganda) Shamirah Nabadda	(Burundi) Fides Bangourabona (Mali) Fanta Kone	(Mauritius) Maria Rivet (Rwanda) Salima Mukansanga (Eswatini) Letticia Viana
CAF	(Namibia) Antsino Twanyanyukwa	(Cameroon) Carine Atezambong Fomo (Zambia) Diana Chikotesha	(Mauritius) Maria Rivet (Rwanda) Salima Mukansanga (Eswatini) Letticia Viana
CONCACAF	(United States) Alyssa Pennington	(Jamaica) Jassett Kerr-Wilson (United States) Meghan Mullen	(El Salvador) Ismael Cornejo (Mexico) Diana Pérez
CONCACAF	(Mexico) Lizzet García	(Mexico) Aranza Quero Aguilar (Mexico) Jéssica Morales	(El Salvador) Ismael Cornejo (Mexico) Diana Pérez
CONCACAF	(Costa Rica) Marianela Araya	(Honduras) Lourdes Noriega (Honduras) Shirley Perelló	(El Salvador) Ismael Cornejo (Mexico) Diana Pérez
CONCACAF	(Canada) Myriam Marcotte	(Canada) Gabrielle Lemieux (Suriname) Mijensa Rensch	(El Salvador) Ismael Cornejo (Mexico) Diana Pérez
CONMEBOL	(Uruguay) Anahí Fernández	(Uruguay) Daiana Fernández (Uruguay) Sofia Sarzay Castro	(Chile) Rodrigo Carvajal (Colombia) María Victoria Daza (Ecuador) Susana Corella (Venezuela) Stefani Escobar
CONMEBOL	(Brazil) Charly Straub	(Brazil) Anne Gomes de Sá (Brazil) Fernanda Gomes Antunes	(Chile) Rodrigo Carvajal (Colombia) María Victoria Daza (Ecuador) Susana Corella (Venezuela) Stefani Escobar
CONMEBOL	(Chile) Dione Rissios	(Chile) Leslie Vásquez (Chile) Yomara Salazar	(Chile) Rodrigo Carvajal (Colombia) María Victoria Daza (Ecuador) Susana Corella (Venezuela) Stefani Escobar
CONMEBOL	(Peru) Milagros Arruela	(Peru) Mariana Aquino (Peru) Vera Yupanqui	(Chile) Rodrigo Carvajal (Colombia) María Victoria Daza (Ecuador) Susana Corella (Venezuela) Stefani Escobar
UEFA	(Romania) Alina Peșu	(Finland) Heini Hyvönen (Romania) Daniela Constatinescu	(Greece) Angelos Evangelou (Hungary) Eszter Urbán (Portugal) Catarina Ferreira (Serbia) Jelena Jovanović-Džajić
UEFA	(Romania) Iuliana Demetrescu	(Lithuania) Irina Pozdejeva (Poland) Paulina Baranowska	(Greece) Angelos Evangelou (Hungary) Eszter Urbán (Portugal) Catarina Ferreira (Serbia) Jelena Jovanović-Džajić
UEFA	(Italy) Maria Sole Ferrieri Caputi	(England) Emily Carney (Italy) Stefania Signorelli	(Greece) Angelos Evangelou (Hungary) Eszter Urbán (Portugal) Catarina Ferreira (Serbia) Jelena Jovanović-Džajić
UEFA	(Spain) Marta Huerta de Aza	(Portugal) Andreia Sousa (Spain) Iragartze Fernández	(Greece) Angelos Evangelou (Hungary) Eszter Urbán (Portugal) Catarina Ferreira (Serbia) Jelena Jovanović-Džajić
UEFA	(Italy) Silvia Gasperotti	(Italy) Giulia Tempestilli (Ukraine) Svitlana Grushko	(Greece) Angelos Evangelou (Hungary) Eszter Urbán (Portugal) Catarina Ferreira (Serbia) Jelena Jovanović-Džajić

== Group stage ==
All times are local, CEST (UTC+2).

Tie-breaking criteria for group stage ranking
The ranking of teams in each group was determined by the points obtained in all group matches. If two or more teams were equal on points, the following criteria were used to determine the ranking:
1. Most points obtained in the group matches played between the teams concerned;
2. Superior goal difference in the group matches played between the teams concerned;
3. Most goals scored in the group matches played between the teams concerned;

If, after having applied criteria a to c, teams still had an equal ranking, criteria a to c were reapplied exclusively to the matches between the teams who were still level to determine their final rankings. (Note: When there were two or more teams tied on points, criteria a to c were applied. After these criteria were applied, they may have defined the position of some of the teams involved, but not all of them. For example, if there was a three-way tie on points, the application of the first three criteria may only have broken the tie for one of the teams, leaving the other two teams still tied. In this case, the tiebreaking procedure was resumed, from the beginning, for those teams that were still tied.) If this procedure did not lead to a decision, criteria d to h applied.

4. Superior goal difference in all group matches;
5. Most goals scored in all group matches;
6. Highest team conduct ("fair play") score in all group matches (only one deduction could be applied to a player or team coach/official in a single match):
  - Yellow card: −1 point;
  - Indirect red card (second yellow card): −3 points;
  - Direct red card: −4 points;
  - Yellow card and direct red card: −5 points;
7. Drawing of lots.

=== Group A ===
Pos	Team	Pld	W	D	L	GF	GA	GD	Pts	Qualification
1	Poland (H)	3	3	0	0	9	2	+7	9	Knockout stage
2	Argentina	3	2	0	1	11	5	+6	6	Knockout stage
3	Mexico	3	0	1	2	5	7	−2	1	
4	Benin	3	0	1	2	3	14	−11	1	

Source: FIFA
Rules for classification: Group stage tiebreakers
(H) Hosts
5 September 2026
15:00

Poland	3–0	Argentina
Związek 26'; Paz 30' (o.g.); Zielińska 90+5'	Report

Arena Katowice, Katowice
Attendance: 4,401
Referee: Myriam Marcotte (Canada)
5 September 2026
18:00

Mexico	2–2	Benin
Ali. Soto 21'; Saldívar 51'	Report	Gandonou 56' (pen.), 87'

Arena Katowice, Katowice
Attendance: 300
Referee: Maria Sole Ferrieri Caputi (Italy)

8 September 2026
15:00

Benin	0–8	Argentina
	Report	Vinhas 16'; Diz 32', 48'; Paz 45+7', 60', 63', 66'; Aguilar 80'

Arena Katowice, Katowice
Attendance: 374
Referee: Alyssa Pennington (United States)
8 September 2026
18:00

Poland	2–1	Mexico
Związek 9'; Witek 76' (pen.)	Report	Bartczak 5' (o.g.)

Arena Katowice, Katowice
Attendance: 2,832
Referee: Anahí Fernández (Uruguay)

11 September 2026
18:00

Benin	1–4	Poland
Gandonou 87'	Report	Grzywińska 26', 63', 70'; Wyrwas 31'

Stadion Miejski Bielsko-Biała, Bielsko-Biała
Attendance: 4,002
Referee: Milagros Arruela (Peru)
11 September 2026
18:00

Argentina	3–2	Mexico
Paz 29'; Velasco Heim 78'; Delgado 90+2'	Report	Ramírez 36', 42'

Arena Katowice, Katowice
Attendance: 483
Referee: Shamirah Nabadda (Uganda)

=== Group B ===
Pos	Team	Pld	W	D	L	GF	GA	GD	Pts	Qualification
1	Brazil	3	3	0	0	9	2	+7	9	Knockout stage
2	England	3	1	1	1	7	4	+3	4 (Note: Team conduct score: England −2, Canada −5.)	Knockout stage
3	Canada	3	1	1	1	7	4	+3	4	Knockout stage
4	Tanzania	3	0	0	3	2	15	−13	0	

Source: FIFA
Rules for classification: Group stage tiebreakers
Notes:
5 September 2026
15:00

Brazil	4–1	Tanzania
Thaynara 14'; Evelin 49', 68'; Vitorinha 81'	Report	Gerald 39' (pen.)

Stadion Miejski Bielsko-Biała, Bielsko-Biała
Attendance: 820
Referee: Marta Huerta (Spain)
5 September 2026
18:00

Canada	1–1	England
Chukwu 52'	Report	Maltby 89' (pen.)

Stadion Miejski Bielsko-Biała, Bielsko-Biała
Attendance: 637
Referee: Anahí Fernández (Uruguay)

8 September 2026
15:00

Brazil	3–0	Canada
Nogueira 7' (pen.); Vitorinha 49'; Brendha 52'	Report

Stadion Miejski Bielsko-Biała, Bielsko-Biała
Attendance: 367
Referee: Maria Sole Ferrieri Caputi (Italy)
8 September 2026
18:00

England	5–1	Tanzania
Ademiluyi 9'; Maltby 15' (pen.), 43' (pen.), 45+5'; Gale 74'	Report	Mnunduka 65'

Stadion Miejski Bielsko-Biała, Bielsko-Biała
Attendance: 627
Referee: Dione Rissios (Chile)

11 September 2026
15:00

England	1–2	Brazil
Dent 31'	Report	Clarinha 76' (pen.); Gisele 90+5'

Stadion Miejski Bielsko-Biała, Bielsko-Biała
Attendance: 1,005
Referee: Alyssa Pennington (United States)
11 September 2026
15:00

Tanzania	0–6	Canada
	Report	Maseke 7' (o.g.); Chisholm 49'; Chukwu 54', 66'; Hunter 76'; Tarasco 85'

Arena Katowice, Katowice
Attendance: 247
Referee: Kim Yu-jeong (South Korea)

=== Group C ===
Pos	Team	Pld	W	D	L	GF	GA	GD	Pts	Qualification
1	France	3	2	1	0	8	3	+5	7	Knockout stage
2	South Korea	3	1	1	1	5	6	−1	4	Knockout stage
3	Ecuador	3	1	0	2	7	6	+1	3	
4	Ghana	3	1	0	2	3	8	−5	3	

Source: FIFA
Rules for classification: Group stage tiebreakers
6 September 2026
15:00

France	1–1	South Korea
N. Traoré 36'	Report	Jo Hye-young 12'

Arena Sosnowiec, Sosnowiec
Attendance: 421
Referee: Charly Wendy Straub Deretti (Brazil)
6 September 2026
18:00

Ecuador	3–0	Ghana
Flores 4'; Arboleda 17', 70'	Report

Arena Sosnowiec, Sosnowiec
Attendance: 236
Referee: Silvia Gasperotti (Italy)

9 September 2026
15:00

Ghana	3–1	South Korea
Nyarko 52'; Osei Owusu 55'; Nam Seung-eun 84' (o.g.)	Report	Beom Ye-ju 90+5'

Arena Sosnowiec, Sosnowiec
Attendance: 215
Referee: Alina Pesu (Romania)
9 September 2026
18:00

France	3–2	Ecuador
Rouquet 22' (pen.); Bizet 48'; Lushimba Bilombi 87'	Report	Burgos 10'; Pico 42' (pen.)

Arena Sosnowiec, Sosnowiec
Attendance: 325
Referee: Asaka Koizumi (Japan)

12 September 2026
18:00

Ghana	0–4	France
	Report	Bertrand 59'; Rouquet 69', 86'; Graziani 81' (pen.)

Arena Sosnowiec, Sosnowiec
Attendance: 335
Referee: Dione Rissios (Chile)
12 September 2026
18:00

South Korea	3–2	Ecuador
Lee Ha-eun 22'; Park Ju-ha 72'; Kim Min-seo 74'	Report	Morán 57'; Burgos 90+2'

Stadion Miejski ŁKS Łódź, Łódź
Attendance: 200
Referee: Marianela Araya (Costa Rica)

=== Group D ===
Pos	Team	Pld	W	D	L	GF	GA	GD	Pts	Qualification
1	Italy	3	2	1	0	6	2	+4	7	Knockout stage
2	Japan	3	1	2	0	5	4	+1	5	Knockout stage
3	United States	3	1	1	1	12	4	+8	4	Knockout stage
4	New Zealand	3	0	0	3	1	14	−13	0	

Source: FIFA
Rules for classification: Group stage tiebreakers
6 September 2026
15:00

Japan	2–1	New Zealand
Matsunaga 49', 90+2' (pen.)	Report	L. Brazendale 59'

Stadion Miejski ŁKS Łódź, Łódź
Attendance: 385
Referee: Antsino Twanyanyukwa (Namibia)
6 September 2026
18:00

United States	1–2	Italy
M. Johnson 18'	Report	Fadda 40'; Pellegrino Cimò 59'

Stadion Miejski ŁKS Łódź, Łódź
Attendance: 267
Referee: Casey Reibelt (Australia)

9 September 2026
15:00

Italy	3–0	New Zealand
Ventriglia 78', 83'; Appiah 89'	Report

Stadion Miejski ŁKS Łódź, Łódź
Attendance: 287
Referee: Lizzet García (Mexico)
9 September 2026
18:00

Japan	2–2	United States
Tago 74'; Nakamura 83'	Report	McCammon 35'; Buck 75'

Stadion Miejski ŁKS Łódź, Łódź
Attendance: 718
Referee: Marta Huerta (Spain)

12 September 2026
15:00

Italy	1–1	Japan
Fadda 59' (pen.)	Report	Tago 80'

Stadion Miejski ŁKS Łódź, Łódź
Attendance: 515
Referee: Myriam Marcotte (Canada)
12 September 2026
15:00

New Zealand	0–9	United States
	Report	Buck 4', 58'; Fuller 6', 83', 90+2' (pen.); M. Johnson 38'; Ullmark 43'; Adames 60'; Strawn 87'

Arena Sosnowiec, Sosnowiec
Attendance: 375
Referee: Anahí Fernández (Uruguay)

=== Group E ===
Pos	Team	Pld	W	D	L	GF	GA	GD	Pts	Qualification
1	North Korea	3	3	0	0	9	0	+9	9	Knockout stage
2	Portugal	3	1	1	1	3	2	+1	4	Knockout stage
3	Colombia	3	1	1	1	3	4	−1	4	Knockout stage
4	Costa Rica	3	0	0	3	1	10	−9	0	

Source: FIFA
Rules for classification: Group stage tiebreakers
7 September 2026
15:00

North Korea	2–0	Portugal
Kang Ryu-mi 25' (pen.), 50'	Report

Stadion Miejski ŁKS Łódź, Łódź
Attendance: 242
Referee: Milagros Arruela (Peru)
7 September 2026
18:00

Costa Rica	1–3	Colombia
Scott 6'	Report	Viáfara 26' (pen.); Silva 56'; Cortés 80'

Stadion Miejski ŁKS Łódź, Łódź
Attendance: 358
Referee: Kim Yu-jeong (South Korea)

10 September 2026
15:00

North Korea	4–0	Costa Rica
Pak Ok-i 26'; Choe Yon-a 55', 85' (pen.); Ho Kyong 90+6'	Report

Stadion Miejski ŁKS Łódź, Łódź
Attendance: 223
Referee: Silvia Gasperotti (Italy)
10 September 2026
18:00

Colombia	0–0	Portugal
	Report

Stadion Miejski ŁKS Łódź, Łódź
Attendance: 444
Referee: Emma Kocbek (Australia)

13 September 2026
18:00

Colombia	0–3	North Korea
	Report	Choe Rim-jong 11'; Choe Yon-a 81' (pen.), 85' (pen.)

Stadion Miejski ŁKS Łódź, Łódź
Attendance: 732
Referee: Maria Sole Ferrieri Caputi (Italy)
13 September 2026
18:00

Portugal	3–0	Costa Rica
Marques 7', 58'; Tristão 34'	Report

Arena Sosnowiec, Sosnowiec
Attendance: 215
Referee: Asaka Koizumi (Japan)

=== Group F ===
Pos	Team	Pld	W	D	L	GF	GA	GD	Pts	Qualification
1	Spain	3	3	0	0	16	1	+15	9	Knockout stage
2	Nigeria	3	1	1	1	10	3	+7	4	Knockout stage
3	China	3	1	1	1	6	3	+3	4	Knockout stage
4	New Caledonia	3	0	0	3	1	26	−25	0	

Source: FIFA
Rules for classification: Group stage tiebreakers
7 September 2026
15:00

New Caledonia	0–5	China
	Report	Xiao Yafei 46'; Huang Jiaxin 71', 80', 83'; Zhou Xinyi 74'

Arena Sosnowiec, Sosnowiec
Attendance: 155
Referee: Shamirah Nabadda (Uganda)
7 September 2026
18:00

Spain	2–0	Nigeria
M. García 13'; Cerrato 70'	Report

Arena Sosnowiec, Sosnowiec
Attendance: 395
Referee: Marianela Araya (Costa Rica)

10 September 2026
15:00

Spain	11–0	New Caledonia
Comendador 10', 49'; M. García 17', 45+1'; Segura 33', 46', 53', 65' (pen.); Cerrato 43'; Julià 89'; Domínguez 90+4'	Report

Arena Sosnowiec, Sosnowiec
Attendance: 132
Referee: Antsino Twanyanyukwa (Namibia)
10 September 2026
18:00

China	0–0	Nigeria
	Report

Arena Sosnowiec, Sosnowiec
Attendance: 186
Referee: Charly Wendy Straub Deretti (Brazil)

13 September 2026
15:00

China	1–3	Spain
Huang Jiaxin 66'	Report	Agote 19' (pen.); Comendador 41', 45+1'

Arena Sosnowiec, Sosnowiec
Attendance: 715
Referee: Lizzet Garcia (Mexico)
13 September 2026
15:00

Nigeria	10–1	New Caledonia
Kareem 17' (pen.), 27', 64'; Adegbemile 19', 74'; Akekoromowei 23'; David 60', 75', 90+4'; Rafiu 70'	Report	Kourevi 89'

Stadion Miejski ŁKS Łódź, Łódź
Attendance: 402
Referee: Alina Pesu (Romania)

=== Ranking of third-placed teams ===
The four best third-placed teams from the six groups advance to the knockout stage along with the six group winners and six runners-up.

Pos	Grp	Team	Pld	W	D	L	GF	GA	GD	Pts	Qualification
1	D	United States	3	1	1	1	12	4	+8	4	Knockout stage
2	B	Canada	3	1	1	1	7	4	+3	4	Knockout stage
3	F	China	3	1	1	1	6	3	+3	4	Knockout stage
4	E	Colombia	3	1	1	1	3	4	−1	4	Knockout stage
5	C	Ecuador	3	1	0	2	7	6	+1	3	
6	A	Mexico	3	0	1	2	5	7	−2	1	

Source: FIFA
Rules for classification: 1) Points; 2) Goal difference; 3) Goals scored; 4) Team conduct ("fair play") score; 5) Drawing of lots.

== Knockout stage ==
In the knockout stage, if a match was level at the end of normal playing time, extra time was played (two periods of fifteen minutes each) and followed, if necessary, by a penalty shoot-out to determine the winner.

=== Bracket ===
Round of 16
16 September – Sosnowiec
Argentina	0
South Korea	1
16 September – Sosnowiec
Italy (p)	1 (5)
China	1 (4)
16 September – Katowice
Brazil (p)	1 (5)
United States	1 (4)
16 September – Katowice
Spain	2
Portugal	0
17 September – Łódź
North Korea	2
Japan	0
17 September – Łódź
France	1
Canada	3
17 September – Bielsko-Biała
England	0
Nigeria	3
17 September – Bielsko-Biała
Poland	0
Colombia	1

Quarter-finals
19 September – Sosnowiec
South Korea	1
Italy	3
19 September – Sosnowiec
Brazil	0
Spain	1
20 September – Łódź
North Korea	2
Canada	0
20 September – Łódź
Nigeria	0
Colombia	1

Semi-finals
23 September – Łódź
Italy	0
Spain	2
23 September – Łódź
North Korea	3
Colombia	0

Final
27 September – Łódź
Spain (p)	0 (4)
North Korea	0 (3)
Third place match
26 September – Łódź
Italy	1 (3)
Colombia (p)	1 (4)

=== Round of 16 ===
16 September 2026
15:00

Argentina	0−1	South Korea
	Report	Beom Ye-ju 33'

Arena Sosnowiec, Sosnowiec
Attendance: 141
Referee: Marta Huerta de Aza (Spain)

16 September 2026
15:00

Brazil	1–1 (a.e.t.)	United States
Sofia Couto 59'	Report	McCammon 63'
Penalties
Brendha (penalty scored); Gisele (penalty scored); Emilly Lucas (penalty scored); Aninha (penalty scored); Bianca (penalty scored)	5–4	(penalty missed) Adames; (penalty scored) McCammon; (penalty scored) Nguyen; (penalty scored) Joseph; (penalty scored) Alvarez

Arena Katowice, Katowice
Attendance: 314
Referee: Silvia Gasperotti (Italy)

16 September 2026
18:30

Italy	1–1 (a.e.t.)	China
Appiah 34'	Report	Belli 73' (o.g.)
Penalties
Cherubini (penalty scored); Ventriglia (penalty scored); Zamboni (penalty scored); Bressan (penalty scored); Langella (penalty scored)	5–4	(penalty scored) Ye Tong; (penalty scored) Huang Jiaxin; (penalty scored) Zhou Xinyi; (penalty scored) Xiao Yafei; (penalty missed) Li Chenyu

Arena Sosnowiec, Sosnowiec
Attendance: 302
Referee: Alyssa Pennington (United States)

16 September 2026
18:30

Spain	2–0	Portugal
M. García 9'; Pina 70' (o.g.)	Report

Arena Katowice, Katowice
Attendance: 491
Referee: Asaka Koizumi (Japan)

17 September 2026
15:00

France	1–3	Canada
Roche-Dufour 81'	Report	Hunter 28', 33', 70'

Stadion Miejski ŁKS Łódź, Łódź
Attendance: 225
Referee: Antsino Twanyanyukwa (Namibia)

17 September 2026
15:00

England	0–3	Nigeria
	Report	Rafiu 8'; Akekoromowei 47'; Mamudu 73'

Stadion Miejski Bielsko-Biała, Bielsko-Biała
Attendance: 615
Referee: Myriam Marcotte (Canada)

17 September 2026
18:30

North Korea	2–0	Japan
Furuta 65' (o.g.); Choe Yon-a 69'	Report

Stadion Miejski ŁKS Łódź, Łódź
Attendance: 551
Referee: Charly Straub (Brazil)

17 September 2026
18:30

Poland	0–1	Colombia
	Report	Bartczak 89' (o.g.)

Stadion Miejski Bielsko-Biała, Bielsko-Biała
Attendance: 5,026
Referee: Casey Reibelt (Australia)

=== Quarter-finals ===
19 September 2026
15:00

South Korea	1–3	Italy
Lee Ha-eun 43'	Report	Appiah 16', 48'; Fadda 63'

Arena Sosnowiec, Sosnowiec
Attendance: 449
Referee: Milagros Arruela (Peru)

19 September 2026
18:30

Brazil	0–1	Spain
	Report	Comendador 27'

Arena Sosnowiec, Sosnowiec
Attendance: 1,015
Referee: Lizzet García (Mexico)

20 September 2026
18:30

North Korea	2–0	Canada
Choe Rim-jong 90+2'; Ho Kyong 90+6'	Report

Stadion Miejski ŁKS Łódź, Łódź
Attendance: 669
Referee: Maria Sole Ferrieri Caputi (Italy)

20 September 2026
15:00

Nigeria	0–1	Colombia
	Report	Loboa 90+2'

Stadion Miejski ŁKS Łódź, Łódź
Attendance: 1,325
Referee: Marianela Araya (Costa Rica)

=== Semi-finals ===
23 September 2026
15:00

Italy	0–2	Spain
	Report	Belli 40' (o.g.); Comendador 56'

Stadion Miejski ŁKS Łódź, Łódź
Attendance: 650
Referee: Alina Peșu (Romania)

23 September 2026
18:30

North Korea	3–0	Colombia
Pak Ok-I 28'; Choe Rim-jong 35'; So Ryu-gyong 47'	Report

Stadion Miejski ŁKS Łódź, Łódź
Attendance: 972
Referee: Casey Reibelt (Australia)

=== Bronze final ===
26 September 2026
18:00

Italy	1–1 (a.e.t.)	Colombia
Pellegrino Cimò 43'	Report	Cabezas 62'
Penalties
Langella (penalty scored); Fadda (penalty scored); Ventriglia (penalty scored); Bressan (penalty missed); Gallo (penalty missed); Venturelli (penalty missed)	3–4	(penalty missed) Viáfara; (penalty scored) Loboa; (penalty scored) Torres; (penalty missed) Arboleda; (penalty scored) Cortés; (penalty scored) Martínez

Stadion Miejski ŁKS Łódź, Łódź
Attendance: 1,205
Referee: Lizzet García (Mexico)

=== Final ===
27 September 2026
18:00

Spain	0–0 (a.e.t.)	North Korea
	Report
Penalties
M. García (penalty scored); Segura (penalty scored); Julià (penalty scored); Agote (penalty scored)	4–3	(penalty scored) Ho Kyong; (penalty missed) Choe Yon-a; (penalty scored) Ri Pom; (penalty scored) Jon Il-chong; (penalty missed) Pak Il-sim

Stadion Miejski ŁKS Łódź, Łódź
Attendance: 8,047
Referee: Charly Straub (Brazil)

2026 FIFA U-20 Women's World Cup winners

Spain
Second title

== Awards ==
The following awards were given for performances at the tournament:

Golden Ball	Silver Ball	Bronze Ball
(Spain) Rosalía Domínguez	(North Korea) Ri Kuk-hyang	(Spain) Pau Comendador
Golden Boot	Silver Boot	Bronze Boot
(Spain) Pau Comendador	(Argentina) Annika Paz	(North Korea) Choe Yon-a
6 goals	5 goals, 1 assist	5 goals
Golden Glove
(Spain) Laia López
FIFA Fair Play Award
United States

== Statistics ==
=== Goalscorers ===
There were 181 goals scored in 52 matches, for an average of 3.48 goals per match.

6 goals

- (Spain) Pau Comendador

5 goals

- (Argentina) Annika Paz
- (North Korea) Choe Yon-a

4 goals

- (Canada) Kaylee Hunter
- (China) Huang Jiaxin
- (England) Rachel Maltby
- (Italy) Karen Appiah
- (Spain) Marísa García
- (Spain) Celia Segura

3 goals

- (Benin) Romaine Gandonou
- (Canada) Annabelle Chukwu
- (France) Justine Rouquet
- (Italy) Paola Fadda
- (Nigeria) Winner Onajite David
- (Nigeria) Ramotalahi Kareem
- (North Korea) Choe Rim-jong
- (Poland) Zuzanna Grzywińska
- (United States) Alex Buck
- (United States) Kennedy Fuller

2 goals

- (Argentina) Mercedes Diz
- (Brazil) Evelin
- (Brazil) Vitorinha
- (Ecuador) Doménica Arboleda
- (Ecuador) Evelyn Burgos
- (Italy) Giada Pellegrino Cimò
- (Italy) Rosanna Ventriglia
- (Japan) Miyu Matsunaga
- (Japan) Natsumi Tago
- (Mexico) Deiry Ramírez
- (Nigeria) Rebecca Adegbemile
- (Nigeria) Janet Akekoromowei
- (Nigeria) Tosin Rafiu
- (North Korea) Ho Kyong
- (North Korea) Kang Ryu-mi
- (North Korea) Pak Ok-i
- (Poland) Oliwia Związek
- (South Korea) Beom Ye-ju
- (Portugal) Anna Marques
- (Spain) Alba Cerrato
- (United States) Micayla Johnson
- (United States) Ainsley McCammon

1 goal

- (Argentina) Julieta Aguilar
- (Argentina) Dolo Delgado
- (Argentina) Alma Velasco Heim
- (Argentina) Julia Vinhas
- (Brazil) Brendha
- (Brazil) Clarinha
- (Brazil) Gisele
- (Brazil) Nogueira
- (Brazil) Thaynara
- (Brazil) Sofia Couto
- (Canada) Olivia Chisholm
- (Canada) Liana Tarasco
- (China) Xiao Yafei
- (China) Zhou Xinyi
- (Colombia) Sintia Cabezas
- (Colombia) Catalina Cortés
- (Colombia) Valerin Loboa
- (Colombia) Mariana Silva
- (Colombia) María Fernanda Viáfara
- (Costa Rica) Sheika Scott
- (Ecuador) Rosa Flores
- (Ecuador) Dariana Morán
- (Ecuador) Fiorella Pico
- (England) Princess Ademiluyi
- (England) Lily Dent
- (England) Jessie Gale
- (France) Clara Bertrand
- (France) Aude Bizet
- (France) Landryna Lushimba Bilombi
- (France) Ornella Graziani
- (France) Kenza Roche-Dufour
- (France) Naolia Traoré
- (Ghana) Sarah Nyarko
- (Ghana) Ivy Osei Owusu
- (Japan) Konoha Nakamura
- (Mexico) Montserrat Saldívar
- (Mexico) Alice Soto
- (New Caledonia) Joceline Kourevi
- (New Zealand) Lily Brazendale
- (Nigeria) Mary Mamadu
- (North Korea) So Ryu-gyong
- (Poland) Zuzanna Witek
- (Poland) Kinga Wyrwas
- (Poland) Maja Zielińska
- (Portugal) Carolina Tristão
- (South Korea) Jo Hye-young
- (South Korea) Kim Min-seo
- (South Korea) Lee Ha-eun
- (South Korea) Lee Ha-eun
- (South Korea) Park Ju-ha
- (Spain) Daniela Agote
- (Spain) Rosalía Domínguez
- (Spain) Carla Julià
- (Tanzania) Winfrida Gerald
- (Tanzania) Jamila Mnunduka
- (United States) Emeri Adames
- (United States) Sealey Strawn
- (United States) Linda Ullmark

1 own goal

- (Argentina) Annika Paz (against Poland)
- (Japan) Asako Furuta (against North Korea)
- (Portugal) Nair Pina (against Spain)
- (South Korea) Nam Seung-eun (against Ghana)
- (Tanzania) Ester Maseke (against Canada)

2 own goals

- (Italy) Elena Belli (against China and Spain)
- (Poland) Martyna Bartczak (against Mexico and Colombia)

=== Tournament ranking ===
Per statistical convention in soccer, matches decided in extra time were counted as wins and losses, while matches decided by penalty shootouts were counted as draws.

Pos	Grp	Team	Pld	W	D	L	GF	GA	GD	Pts	Final result
1	F	Spain	7	6	1	0	21	1	+20	19	Champions
2	E	North Korea	7	6	1	0	16	0	+16	19	Runners-up
3	E	Colombia	7	3	2	2	6	8	−2	11	Third place
4	D	Italy	7	3	3	1	11	7	+4	12	Fourth place
5	B	Brazil	5	3	1	1	10	4	+6	10	Eliminated in quarter-finals
6	F	Nigeria	5	2	1	2	13	4	+9	7	Eliminated in quarter-finals
7	B	Canada	5	2	1	2	10	7	+3	7	Eliminated in quarter-finals
8	C	South Korea	5	2	1	2	7	9	−2	7	Eliminated in quarter-finals
9	A	Poland (H)	4	3	0	1	9	3	+6	9	Eliminated in round of 16
10	C	France	4	2	1	1	9	6	+3	7	Eliminated in round of 16
11	A	Argentina	4	2	0	2	11	6	+5	6	Eliminated in round of 16
12	D	United States	4	1	2	1	13	5	+8	5	Eliminated in round of 16
13	F	China	4	1	2	1	7	4	+3	5	Eliminated in round of 16
14	D	Japan	4	1	2	1	5	6	−1	5	Eliminated in round of 16
15	B	England	4	1	1	2	7	7	0	4	Eliminated in round of 16
16	E	Portugal	4	1	1	2	3	4	−1	4	Eliminated in round of 16
17	C	Ecuador	3	1	0	2	7	6	+1	3	Eliminated in group stage
18	C	Ghana	3	1	0	2	3	8	−5	3	Eliminated in group stage
19	A	Mexico	3	0	1	2	5	7	−2	1	Eliminated in group stage
20	A	Benin	3	0	1	2	3	14	−11	1	Eliminated in group stage
21	E	Costa Rica	3	0	0	3	1	10	−9	0	Eliminated in group stage
22	B	Tanzania	3	0	0	3	2	15	−13	0	Eliminated in group stage
23	D	New Zealand	3	0	0	3	1	14	−13	0	Eliminated in group stage
24	F	New Caledonia	3	0	0	3	1	26	−25	0	Eliminated in group stage

Source: FIFA
(H) Hosts

== Controversies ==
=== UEFA boycott attempt ===
On 30 July 2026, following FIFA's announcement of FIFA Forward Enterprise (a proposal to sell stakes in FIFA's tournament operations, including for the U-20 Women's World Cup, to private investors), all 55 UEFA member associations agreed on an indefinite boycott of FIFA competitions until the proposal was shelved and assurances were made that such a proposal would not be tabulated again. As the boycott was announced with just over a month until the tournament would begin, it was unclear what the impact of the boycott would be on the five qualified UEFA teams, including hosts Poland. On 31 July 2026, the Polish Football Association stated that the tournament was expected to go ahead as normal and that no UEFA teams had indicated a potential withdrawal. That same day, FIFA scrapped the investment proposal, although UEFA stated that, regardless, it had 'lost confidence' in FIFA's governance. On 7 August, the French Football Federation stated that the France national team would still participate in the tournament. On 27 August, following written assurances that a similar private investment proposal wouldn't be brought up, UEFA provisionally suspended their boycott for the 2026–27 season, which included the FIFA U-20 Women's World Cup.

== See also ==
- 2026 FIFA U-17 Women's World Cup
