= New Zealand women's national under-20 football team =

New Zealand Women's U-20
- Nickname: Junior Football Ferns
- Association: New Zealand Football
- Confederation: OFC (Oceania)
- Head coach: Callum Holmes
- Most caps: Emma Rolston (26)
- Top scorer: Emma Rolston (32)
- FIFA code: NZL
First colours	Second colours

First international
- New Zealand 0–2 Australia (New Plymouth, New Zealand; 31 March 1994)

Biggest win
- New Zealand 30–0 Samoa (Matavera, Cook Islands; 31 August 2019)

Biggest defeat
- New Zealand 0–9 United States (Sosnowiec, Poland; 12 September 2026)

OFC U-19 Women's Championship
- Appearances: 10 (first in 2002)
- Best result: Champions (2006, 2010, 2012, 2014, 2015, 2017, 2019, 2023, 2025)

FIFA U-20 Women's World Cup
- Appearances: 10 (first in 2006)
- Best result: Quarter-finals (2014)

The New Zealand women's under-20 football team, informally known as the "Junior Football Ferns", is the representative team for New Zealand in international under-20 women's football.

== Fixtures and results ==
The following is a list of match results in the last 12 months, as well as any future matches that have been scheduled.

Win Draw Loss Fixture

=== 2026 ===
20 May Friendly	Australia	1–1	New Zealand	Canberra, Australia
	Trimis	Report	Bangalan 85'	Stadium: Australian Institute of Sport; Attendance: 0 (behind closed doors)

23 May Friendly	Australia	0–0	New Zealand	Canberra, Australia
		Report		Stadium: Australian Institute of Sport

6 September 2026 FIFA U-20 Women's World Cup Group D	Japan	2–1	New Zealand	Łódź, Poland
15:00 (CEST)	Matsunaga 49', 90+2' (pen.)	Report	L. Brazendale 59'	Stadium: Stadion Miejski ŁKS Łódź; Attendance: 385; Referee: Antsino Twanyanyukwa (Namibia)

9 September 2026 FIFA U-20 Women's World Cup Group D	Italy	3–0	New Zealand	Łódź, Poland
18:00 (CEST)	Ventriglia 78', 83'; Appiah 89'	Report		Stadium: Stadion Miejski ŁKS Łódź; Attendance: 287; Referee: Lizzet García (Mexico)

12 September 2026 FIFA U-20 Women's World Cup Group D	New Zealand	0–9	United States	Sosnowiec, Poland
15:00 (CEST)		Report	Buck 4', 58'; Fuller 6', 83', 90+2' (pen.); M. Johnson 38'; Ullmark 43'; Adames 60'; Strawn 87'	Stadium: Arena Sosnowiec; Attendance: 375; Referee: Anahí Fernández (Uruguay)

== Coaching staff ==
Position	Name
Head coach	(New Zealand) Callum Holmes

== Current squad ==
The following players were named to the squad for the 2026 FIFA U-20 Women's World Cup in Poland in September.

No.	Pos.	Player	Date of birth (age)	Club
1	GK	Brooke Neary	14 October 2007 (age 19)	(New Zealand Football) Wellington Phoenix
12	GK	Scarlett Gray	15 December 2007 (age 18)	(Football Australia) Sydney University
21	GK	Nienke Holland	8 July 2010 (age 16)	(Royal Dutch Football Association) AZ Alkmaar
3	DF	Mackenzie Greene	4 January 2006 (age 20)	(New Zealand Football) Wellington Phoenix
4	DF	Charli Dunn	20 March 2007 (age 19)	(United States Soccer Federation) Middle Tennessee Blue Raiders
5	DF	Alyssha Eglinton	16 January 2007 (age 19)	(New Zealand Football) Wellington Phoenix
13	DF	Freya Des Fountain	7 February 2008 (age 18)	(New Zealand Football) Wellington Phoenix
15	DF	Charley March	11 April 2008 (age 18)	(New Zealand Football) Auckland United
2	MF	Penny Brill	11 July 2006 (age 20)	(United States Soccer Federation) Xavier Musketeers
6	MF	Daisy Brazendale	12 March 2006 (age 20)	(New Zealand Football) Unattached
7	MF	Grace Bartlett	16 May 2007 (age 19)	(New Zealand Football) Auckland United
8	MF	Charlotte Mortlock	9 March 2006 (age 20)	(Football Australia) Northern Tigers
10	MF	Zoe Benson	14 August 2006 (age 20)	(New Zealand Football) Auckland United & Wellington Phoenix
14	MF	Mikaela Bangalan	30 March 2008 (age 18)	(New Zealand Football) Wellington Phoenix
16	MF	Amber De Wit	20 November 2007 (age 18)	(United States Soccer Federation) North Dakota State Bison
17	MF	Grace Duncan	3 April 2008 (age 18)	(United States Soccer Federation) Washington Huskies
9	FW	Pia Vlok	4 September 2008 (age 18)	(New Zealand Football) Wellington Phoenix FC
11	FW	Emily Lyon	17 July 2006 (age 20)	(New Zealand Football) West Coast Rangers
18	FW	Poppy O'Brien	26 February 2007 (age 19)	(United States Soccer Federation) Colorado State University
19	FW	Lily Brazendale	6 May 2006 (age 20)	(New Zealand Football) Wellington Phoenix
20	FW	Laura Bennett	18 November 2008 (age 17)	(New Zealand Football) Melville United

== Competitive record ==
=== OFC U-20 Women's Championship ===
OFC U-19 Women's Championship record
Year	Round	Pld	W	D	L	GF	GA
(Tonga) 2002	Runners-up	5	4	0	1	35	6
(Papua New Guinea) 2004	Did not enter						
(Samoa) 2006	Champions	5	5	0	0	33	1
(New Zealand) 2010	Champions	3	3	0	0	27	0
(New Zealand) 2012	Champions	3	3	0	0	28	1
(New Zealand) 2014	Champions	3	3	0	0	18	1
(Tonga) 2015	Champions	4	4	0	0	69	0
(New Zealand) 2017	Champions	5	5	0	0	48	1
(Cook Islands) 2019	Champions	5	5	0	0	63	2
(Fiji) 2023	Champions	5	5	0	0	45	0
(French Polynesia) 2025	Champions	5	5	0	0	33	0
Total	9 titles	43	42	0	1	399	12

=== FIFA U-20 Women's World Cup ===
Year	Round	Pld	W	D*	L	GF	GA	Squad
(Canada) 2002	Did not qualify							
(Thailand) 2004	Did not enter							
(Russia) 2006	Group stage	3	0	1	2	2	6	Squad
(Chile) 2008	Group stage	3	1	1	1	7	7	Squad
(Germany) 2010	Group stage	3	0	0	3	3	8	Squad
(Japan) 2012	Group stage	3	1	1	1	4	7	Squad
(Canada) 2014	Quarter-finals	4	2	0	2	6	8	Squad
(Papua New Guinea) 2016	Group stage	3	1	0	2	2	5	Squad
(France) 2018	Group stage	3	0	1	2	1	3	Squad
(Costa Rica) 2022	Group stage	3	0	2	1	3	6	Squad
(Colombia) 2024	Group stage	3	0	0	3	2	13	Squad
(Poland) 2026	Group stage	3	0	0	3	1	14	Squad
Total:10/12	Quarter-finals	31	5	6	18	31	77	–

==== FIFA U-20 Women's World Cup match history ====
===== 2006 =====
17 August 2006 Group stage	New Zealand	0–3	Australia	Petrovsky Stadium, Saint Petersburg
		Report	McCallum 39', 80'; Shipard 90+3'	Attendance: 1100; Referee: Gyoengyi Gaal (Hungary)

20 August 2006 Group stage	Russia	3–2	New Zealand	Petrovsky Stadium, Saint Petersburg
	Kozhnikova 5'; Terekhova 14'; Akimova 93'	Report	Erceg 18'; Humphries 56'	Attendance: 3400; Referee: Hong Eun-Ah (South Korea)

23 August 2006 Group stage	Brazil	0–0	New Zealand	Podmoskovie Stadium, Shchyolkovo
		Report		Attendance: 500; Referee: Shane De Silva (Trinidad and Tobago)

===== 2008 =====
19 November 2008 Group stage	New Zealand	2–3	Nigeria	Francisco Sánchez Rumoroso Stadium, Coquimbo
15:00	Percival 42', 52'	Report	Michael 31'; Chukwudi 35'; Chikwelu 90+2'	Referee: (Austria) Tanja Schett

22 November 2008 Group stage	Chile	3–4	New Zealand	Francisco Sánchez Rumoroso Stadium, Coquimbo
21:00	Mardones 50'; Pardo 83'; Zamora 90+2'	Report	White 20', 36' (pen.), 74'; Leota 66'	Attendance: 16,324; Referee: (Costa Rica) Érika Vargas

26 November 2008 Group stage	England	1–1	New Zealand	La Florida Stadium, La Florida
19:00	Duggan 90+4'	Report	McLaughlin 27'	Attendance: 8,661; Referee: (Japan) Sachiko Baba

===== 2010 =====
13 July 2010 Group stage	Sweden	2–1	New Zealand	Bielefelder Alm, Bielefeld
14:30	Görranson 56', 67'	Report	Wilkinson 33'	Attendance: 10,065; Referee: Carol Anne Chenard (Canada)

16 July 2010 Group stage	North Korea	2–1	New Zealand	Bielefelder Alm, Bielefeld
18:00	Yun Hyon-Hi 12'; Kim Un-Hyang 65' (pen.)	Report	Armstrong 90'	Attendance: 6,630; Referee: Mercy Tagoe (Ghana)

20 July 2010 Group stage	New Zealand	1–4	Brazil	Rudolf-Harbig-Stadion, Dresden
14:30	White 89'	Report	Ludmila 25'; Leah 59'; Débora 87', 90'	Attendance: 12,863; Referee: Dagmar Damkova (Czech Republic)

===== 2012 =====
19 August 2012 Group stage	New Zealand	2–1	Switzerland	Miyagi Stadium, Miyagi
16:20	Millynn 39'; White 52'	Report	Aigbogun 90+1'	Attendance: 9,542; Referee: Abirami Apbai (Singapore)

22 August 2012 Group stage	Japan	2–2	New Zealand	Miyagi Stadium, Miyagi
19:20	Tanaka 37'; Michigami 71'	Report	Nakada 11' (o.g.); White 15'	Attendance: 9,061; Referee: Silvia Spinelli (Italy)

26 August 2012 Group stage	Mexico	4–0	New Zealand	Kobe Universiade Memorial Stadium, Kobe
19:20	Sofia Huerta 47'; Natalia Gomez Junco 74'; Yamile Franco 85'; Olivia Jimenez 87'	Report		Referee: Teodora Albon (Romania)

===== 2014 =====
6 August 2014 Group stage	New Zealand	2–0	Paraguay	Olympic Stadium, Montreal
4:20	Rolston 40'; Skilton 43'	Report		Attendance: 4,812; Referee: Kateryna Monzul (Ukraine)

9 August 2014 Group stage	New Zealand	0–4	France	Olympic Stadium, Montreal
5:00		Report	Diani 22'; Lavogez 53'; Le Bihan 80', 82'	Attendance: 6,844; Referee: Therese Sagno (Guinean)

13 August 2014 Group stage	Costa Rica	0–3	New Zealand	National Soccer Stadium, Toronto
5:00		Report	Skilton 24'; Lee 69'; O'Brien 90+4'	Attendance: 6,914; Referee: Kiris Heikkinen (Finland)

17 August 2014 Quarter-finals	Nigeria	4–1	New Zealand	National Soccer Stadium, Toronto
5:00	Oshoala 1', 12'; Sunday 84', 90+'	Report	Rolston 89'	Attendance: 3,588; Referee: Sachiko Yamagishi (Japan)

===== 2016 =====
14 November 2016 Group stage	Ghana	0–1	New Zealand	PNG Football Stadium, Port Moresby
19:00		Report	Christensen 89'	Attendance: 2,877; Referee: Monika Mularczyk (Poland)

17 November 2016 Group stage	New Zealand	1–3	United States	PNG Football Stadium, Port Moresby
19:00	Coombes 76'	Report	Sanchez 3'; Pugh 8'; Watt 82'	Attendance: 2,399; Referee: Thérèse Neguel (Cameroon)

21 November 2016 Group stage	New Zealand	0–2	France	Bava Park, Port Moresby
16:00		Report	Léger 17'; Mateo 47'	Attendance: 995; Referee: Silvia Reyes (Peru)

===== 2018 =====
5 August 2018 Group stage	New Zealand	1–2	Netherlands	Stade de la Rabine, Vannes
16:30	Blake 44'	Report	Kalma 28'; Van Deursen 78'	Attendance: 2,042; Referee: Jana Adámková (Czech Republic)

8 August 2018 Group stage	France	0–0	New Zealand	Stade de la Rabine, Vannes
19:30		Report		Attendance: 5,031; Referee: Lidya Tafesse Abebe (Ethiopia)

12 August 2018 Group stage	Ghana	1–0	New Zealand	Stade Guy Piriou, Concarneau
16:30	Anima 75'	Report		Attendance: 1,056; Referee: Edina Alves Batista (Brazil)

===== 2022 =====
10 August 2022 Group stage	New Zealand	1–1	Mexico	Estadio Alejandro Morera Soto, Alajuela
14:00	Cazares 31' (o.g.)	Report	Vázquez 45'	Attendance: 1,007; Referee: Kim Yu-jeong (South Korea)

13 August 2022 Group stage	Germany	3–0	New Zealand	Estadio Alejandro Morera Soto, Alajuela
11:00 CST (UTC–6)	Fröhlich 58'; Weidauer 64' (pen.); Corley 90+4'	Report (FIFA)		Attendance: 1,391; Referee: Vincentia Amedome (Togo)

16 August 2022 Group stage	Colombia	2–2	New Zealand	Estadio Nacional de Costa Rica, San José
17:00 CST (UTC–6)	Caicedo 10', 63'	Report (FIFA)	Clegg 3'; Lancaster 71'	Attendance: 3,378; Referee: Tori Penso (United States)

===== 2024 =====
2 September 2024 Group stage	Japan	7–0	New Zealand	Estadio El Techo, Bogotá
20:00	Hijikata 16', 38'; Sasai 41', 90+1'; Oyama 45'; Koyama 60'; Hayama 75'	Report		Attendance: 1,045; Referee: Dione Rissios (Chile)

5 September 2024 Group stage	Austria	3–1	New Zealand	Estadio El Techo, Bogotá
20:00	Gutmann 10', 15'; Mädl 67'	Report	Clegg 90'	Attendance: 852; Referee: Akissi Konan (Côte d'Ivoire)

8 September 2024 Group stage	New Zealand	1–3	Ghana	Estadio Pascual Guerrero, Cali
18:00	Elliott 64'	Report	Abdulai 59', 72'; Twum 90+6'	Attendance: 1,613; Referee: María Victoria Daza (Colombia)

===== 2026 =====
6 September 2026 Group stage	Japan	2–1	New Zealand	Stadion Miejski ŁKS Łódź, Łódź, Poland
15:00 (CEST)	Matsunaga 49', 90+2' (pen.)	Report	L. Brazendale 59'	Attendance: 385; Referee: Antsino Twanyanyukwa (Namibia)

9 September 2026 Group stage	Italy	3–0	New Zealand	Stadion Miejski ŁKS Łódź, Łódź, Poland
18:00 (CEST)	Ventriglia 78', 83'; Appiah 89'	Report		Attendance: 287; Referee: Lizzet García (Mexico)

12 September 2026 Group stage	New Zealand	0–9	United States	Arena Sosnowiec, Sosnowiec, Poland
15:00 (CEST)		Report	Buck 4', 58'; Fuller 6', 83', 90+2' (pen.); M. Johnson 38'; Ullmark 43'; Adames 60'; Strawn 87'	Attendance: 375; Referee: Anahí Fernández (Uruguay)

== Head-to-head record ==
The following table shows New Zealand's head-to-head record in the FIFA U-20 Women's World Cup.

As of end of 2026 FIFA U-20 Women's World Cup.

Opponent	Pld	W	D	L	GF	GA	GD	Win %
Australia	1	0	0	1	0	3	−3	0.00
Austria	1	0	0	1	1	3	−2	0.00
Brazil	2	0	1	1	1	4	−3	0.00
Chile	1	1	0	0	4	3	+1	100.00
Colombia	1	0	1	0	2	2	+0	0.00
Costa Rica	1	1	0	0	3	0	+3	100.00
England	1	0	1	0	1	1	+0	0.00
France	3	0	1	2	0	6	−6	0.00
Germany	1	0	0	1	0	3	−3	0.00
Ghana	3	1	0	2	2	4	−2	33.33
Italy	1	0	0	1	0	3	−3	0.00
Japan	3	0	1	2	3	11	−8	0.00
Mexico	2	0	1	1	1	5	−4	0.00
Netherlands	1	0	0	1	1	2	−1	0.00
Nigeria	2	0	0	2	3	7	−4	0.00
North Korea	1	0	0	1	1	2	−1	0.00
Paraguay	1	1	0	0	2	0	+2	100.00
Russia	1	0	0	1	2	3	−1	0.00
Sweden	1	0	0	1	1	2	−1	0.00
Switzerland	1	1	0	0	2	1	+1	100.00
United States	2	0	0	2	1	14	−13	0.00
Total	31	5	6	20	31	77	−46	16.13
