= Choe Yon-a =

North Korean association footballer (born 2007)

Personal information
- Birth name: 최연아
- Date of birth: 1 January 2007 (age 19)
- Place of birth: North Korea
- Height: 1.62 m (5 ft 4 in)
- Position: Midfielder

Senior career*
Years	Team	Apps	(Gls)
2025–	Naegohyang		

International career^{‡}
2024	North Korea U17	6	(1)
2025–	North Korea U20	11	(8)
Medal record
Women's football
Representing North Korea
FIFA U-20 Women's World Cup
Runner-up	2026 Poland
FIFA U-17 Women's World Cup
Winner	2024 Dominican Rep.
AFC U-17 Women's Asian Cup
Winner	2024 Indonesia
- * Club domestic league appearances and goals as of 3 November 2024 ‡ National team caps and goals as of 12 April 2026

Choe Yon-a (Korean: 최연아; born 1 January 2007) is a North Korean footballer who plays as a midfielder or winger for Naegohyang in the DPR Korea Women's Premier League.

In 2024, as a member of the North Korea women's national under-17 team, she competed at the 2024 AFC U-17 Women's Asian Cup and the 2024 FIFA U-17 Women's World Cup, winning both tournaments.

== Club career ==
Choe made her senior club debut with Naegohyang on 9 November 2025, in a AFC Women's Champions League group stage match against Tokyo Verdy Beleza. On 23 May 2026, her club faced Tokyo Verdy Beleza for the final and won 1–0, qualifying to the 2027 FIFA Women's Champions Cup as the Asian representative.

== International career ==
Choe was part of the North Korea U17 squad that won the 2024 AFC U-17 Women's Asian Cup held in Indonesia. On 5 March 2024, she scored her only goal with the U17 team against China in the semifinal, while she also played in the final match, where her team won 1–0 over Japan and secured the championship. A few months later, Choe played in the 2024 FIFA U-17 Women's World Cup, where she was a member of the North Korean team that won the tournament in the Dominican Republic.

In March 2026, Choe was named in the squad for the 2026 AFC U-20 Women's Asian Cup, who were beaten in the final by Japan.

== Honours ==
Naegohyang

- AFC Champions League: 2025–26

North Korea U17

- AFC U-17 Women's Asian Cup: 2024
- FIFA U-17 Women's World Cup: 2024

North Korea U20

- FIFA U-20 Women's World Cup runner-up: 2026

Individual

- FIFA U-20 Women's World Cup Bronze Boot: 2026
