= Poland women's national under-20 football team =

National association football team

Poland Women's U-20
- Association: Polski Związek Piłki Nożnej (PZPN)
- Confederation: UEFA (Europe)
- Head coach: Marcin Kasprowicz
- FIFA code: POL

FIFA U-20 Women's World Cup
- Appearances: 1 (first in 2026)
- Best result: Round of 16 (2026)

Poland women's national under-20 football team is the football team representing Poland in competitions for under-20 year old players and is controlled by the Polish Football Association. The team managed to qualify once for the FIFA U-20 Women's World Cup in 2026 as host.

== Competitive record ==
=== FIFA U-20 Women's World Cup ===
FIFA U-20 Women's World Cup record
Year	Result	Position	Pld	W	D*	L	GF	GA	Squad
(Canada) 2002	Did not qualify								
(Thailand) 2004	Did not qualify								
(Russia) 2006	Did not qualify								
(Chile) 2008	Did not qualify								
(Germany) 2010	Did not qualify								
(Japan) 2012	Did not qualify								
(Canada) 2014	Did not qualify								
(Papua New Guinea) 2016	Did not qualify								
(France) 2018	Did not qualify								
(Costa Rica) 2022	Did not qualify								
(Colombia) 2024	Did not qualify								
(Poland) 2026	Round of 16	9th	4	3	0	1	9	3	Squad
Total: 1/12	Round of 16	9th	4	3	0	1	9	3	-

== Players ==
=== Current squad ===
The following players were called up for the 2026 FIFA U-20 Women's World Cup.

Caps and goals updated as of 17 September 2026, after the match against Colombia.

No.	Pos.	Player	Date of birth (age)	Caps	Goals	Club
1	GK	Julia Woźniak	15 April 2007 (age 19)	3	0	(Portuguese Football Federation) Sporting CP
12	GK	Zuzanna Błaszczyk	17 July 2008 (age 18)	0	0	(Polish Football Association) Śląsk Wrocław
21	GK	Hanna Wieczerzak	29 May 2007 (age 19)	1	0	(Royal Spanish Football Federation) Real Madrid
2	DF	Oliwia Łapińska	9 February 2007 (age 19)	3	0	(Polish Football Association) Czarni Sosnowiec
4	DF	Magda Piekarska	9 September 2007 (age 19)	3	0	(Italian Football Federation) Roma
6	DF	Iga Witkowska	27 March 2007 (age 19)	1	0	(Polish Football Association) Czarni Sosnowiec
13	DF	Zofia Pągowska	25 April 2007 (age 19)	4	0	(Polish Football Association) UKS SMS Łódź
18	DF	Martyna Bartczak	25 June 2007 (age 19)	3	0	(Polish Football Association) UKS SMS Łódź
5	MF	Emilia Sobierajska	22 August 2007 (age 19)	4	0	(Polish Football Association) Czarni Sosnowiec
7	MF	Krystyna Flis	4 January 2007 (age 19)	4	0	(Swiss Football Association) Basel
8	MF	Zuzanna Witek	19 September 2007 (age 19)	4	2	(Danish Football Association) HB Køge
10	MF	Maja Zielińska	11 August 2007 (age 19)	4	1	(Polish Football Association) Legia Warsaw
11	MF	Oliwia Zgoda	8 November 2007 (age 19)	2	0	(Polish Football Association) Czarni Sosnowiec
14	DF	Jagoda Cyraniak	23 May 2006 (age 20)	4	0	(French Football Federation) Marseille
15	MF	Weronika Araśniewicz	15 March 2008 (age 18)	3	0	(German Football Association) VfL Wolfsburg
17	MF	Lena Świrska	19 May 2009 (age 17)	4	0	(Polish Football Association) Pogoń Szczecin
20	MF	Inez Sikora	23 March 2006 (age 20)	4	0	(Polish Football Association) Górnik Łęczna
3	FW	Oliwia Związek	22 June 2007 (age 19)	3	2	(Polish Football Association) Lech Poznań UAM
9	FW	Julia Gutowska	17 February 2007 (age 19)	4	0	(Danish Football Association) HB Køge
16	FW	Zuzanna Grzywińska	23 June 2006 (age 20)	3	3	(German Football Association) 1. FC Nürnberg
19	FW	Kinga Wyrwas	21 January 2007 (age 19)	3	1	(Italian Football Federation) Sassuolo

== Head-to-head record ==
The following table shows Poland's head-to-head record in the FIFA U-20 Women's World Cup.

Opponent	Pld	W	D	L	GF	GA	GD	Win %
Argentina	1	1	0	0	3	0	+3	100.00
Benin	1	1	0	0	4	1	+3	100.00
Colombia	1	0	0	1	0	1	−1	0.00
Mexico	1	1	0	0	2	1	+1	100.00
Total	4	3	0	1	9	3	+6	75.00

== See also ==
- Poland women's national football team
- Poland women's national under-19 football team
- Poland women's national under-17 football team
- FIFA U-20 Women's World Cup
- UEFA Women's Under-19 Championship
