= Elise Mamanu-Gray =

New Zealand Professional Footballer

Eli Mamanu-Gray
Personal information
- Full name: Elise Mamanu-Gray
- Place of birth: Dunedin, New Zealand
- Position: Midfielder

College career
Years	Team	Apps	(Gls)
2010–2014	Indiana University / Purdue University Fort Wayne	51	(11)

Senior career*
Years	Team	Apps	(Gls)
- Roslyn-Wakari
- Dunedin Technical
2015–2018	Heidelberg United	58	(18)
2017	Southern United		

International career^{‡}
2008-2010	New Zealand U17		
2010-2012	New Zealand U20		
2012-2020	New Zealand		
- * Club domestic league appearances and goals as of 14 July 2018 ‡ National team caps and goals as of 25 November 2017

Eli Mamanu-Gray is a New Zealand Professional footballer who last played for NPLW side Southern United. They have represented New Zealand at senior and all age group levels since 2008.

== College career ==
After attending Queen's High School in Dunedin, Mamanu-Gray studied BSc Psychology at Indiana University / Purdue University in 2010.

== Club career ==
In 2017 Mamanu-Gray captained the Southern United side in the New Zealand Women's National League, during the NPL Victoria off season, to their first ever grand final.

Mamanu-Gray signed for Heidelberg United in 2015. They played there for four seasons earning 58 appearances and scoring 18 goals.

== International career ==
Mamanu-Gray has played for New Zealand at U-17, U-20, and women’s national team levels since 2008.

Mamana-Gray was called up to the New Zealand women's national football team in November 2012 for the friendlies against Thailand. She made her debut in the first game on 25 November 2015, which ended as a 0–0 draw.

== Career statistics ==
=== Club ===
As of match played on 14 July 2018.

Appearances and goals by club, season and competition
Club	Season	League			Cup		Others		Total	
Club	Season	Division	Apps	Goals	Apps	Goals	Apps	Goals	Apps	Goals
Heidelberg United	2015	National Premier Leagues Victoria Women	9	2	—		—		9	2
Heidelberg United	2016	National Premier Leagues Victoria Women	16	1	—		—		16	1
Heidelberg United	2017	National Premier Leagues Victoria Women	21	2	—		—		21	2
Heidelberg United	2018	National Premier Leagues Victoria Women	12	3	—		—		12	3
Career total			58	8	—		—		58	8

=== International ===
As of match played on 7 March 2014.

Appearances and goals by national team and year
National team	Year	Apps	Goals
New Zealand	2017	1	0
Total		1	0

== Honours ==
Heidelberg United

- Team App Cup: 2016
