= Germany women's national under-20 football team =

Germany
- Nickname(s): Die Nationalelf (The National Eleven)
- Association: German Football Association (Deutscher Fußball-Bund, DFB)
- Confederation: UEFA (Europe)
- Head coach: Kathrin Peter
- FIFA code: GER
First colours	Second colours

Biggest win
- Germany 9–1 Mexico (Moscow, Russia; 21 August 2006)

Biggest defeat
- United States 4–1 Germany (Saint Petersburg, Russia; 27 August 2006)

European Championship
- Appearances: 20 (first in 1998)
- Best result: Champions (2000, 2001, 2002, 2006, 2007, 2011)

FIFA U-20 Women's World Cup
- Appearances: 11 (first in 2002)
- Best result: Champions (2004, 2010, 2014)

The Germany women's national under-20 football team represents the female under-20s of Germany in the FIFA U-20 Women's World Cup, and is controlled by the German Football Association.

== History ==
=== The German U-20 team and Nordic Cup ===
The German U-20 team participated in the Nordic Cup since the early '90s. Winning the tournament in 1995. Nordic Cup was a U-20 competition from 1990 to 1997.

=== Change of U-18 to U-19 ===
The first three tournaments of the UEFA Women's Under-19 Championship were in the U-18 category. In 2001, the German Football Association decided to change the age limit from the U-18 team to U-19. The move was in preparation for 2002 UEFA Women's Under-19 Championship (competition that served as a qualifying tournament for the 2002 FIFA U-19 Women's World Championship).

=== Competing as a U-20 team ===
==== 2005 and 2006 ====
As the German Football Association did in 2001 prior to the introduction of the U-19 tournament, they raised the age of the squad from U-19 to U-20 in 2005. The move was, again, in response to FIFA's altering of the competition from U-19 to U-20.

== Fixtures and results ==
Legend

Win Draw Loss Fixture

== Players ==
Squad for 2018 FIFA U-20 Women's World Cup in France

Caps and goals as of 24 July 2018.

Head coach: Maren Meinert

No.	Pos.	Player	Date of birth (age)	Caps	Goals	Club
1	GK	Vanessa Fischer	18 April 1998 (age 28)	2	0	(German Football Association) 1. FFC Turbine Potsdam
14	DF	Janina Hechler	28 January 1999 (age 27)	2	0	(German Football Association) 1. FFC Frankfurt
4	DF	Sophia Kleinherne	12 April 2000 (age 26)	3	0	(German Football Association) 1. FFC Frankfurt
7	MF	Giulia Gwinn	2 July 1999 (age 27)	2	0	(German Football Association) SC Freiburg
16	MF	Luca Graf	19 March 1999 (age 27)	3	1	(German Football Association) 1. FFC Turbine Potsdam
15	DF	Nina Lange	14 July 1998 (age 28)	3	0	(German Football Association) MSV Duisburg
18	MF	Klara Bühl	7 December 2000 (age 25)	1	0	(German Football Association) SC Freiburg
10	FW	Laura Freigang	1 February 1998 (age 28)	13	5	(German Football Association) 1. FFC Frankfurt
6	MF	Janina Minge	11 June 1999 (age 27)	5	1	(German Football Association) SC Freiburg
12	GK	Janina Leitzig	16 April 1999 (age 27)	2	0	(German Football Association) TSG Hoffenheim
8	MF	Jana Feldkamp	15 March 1998 (age 28)	10	1	(German Football Association) SGS Essen
2	MF	Dina Orschmann	8 January 1998 (age 28)	9	1	(United States Soccer Federation) University of Central Florida
11	FW	Kristin Kögel	21 September 1999 (age 27)	4	0	(German Football Association) FC Bayern Munich
19	FW	Annalena Rieke	10 January 1999 (age 27)	3	0	(German Football Association) SGS Essen
9	FW	Stefanie Sanders	12 June 1998 (age 28)	12	4	(United States Soccer Federation) University of Central Florida
17	DF	Sjoeke Nüsken	22 January 2001 (age 25)	1	0	(German Football Association) Westfalia Rhynern
21	GK	Charlotte Voll	22 April 1999 (age 27)	0	0	(French Football Federation) Paris Saint-Germain
5	DF	Tanja Pawollek	18 January 1999 (age 27)	5	0	(German Football Association) 1. FFC Frankfurt
20	MF	Lena Oberdorf	19 December 2001 (age 24)	1	1	(German Football Association) SGS Essen
3	DF	Katja Orschmann	8 January 1998 (age 28)	4	0	(German Football Association) 1. FFC Turbine Potsdam
13	DF	Sarai Linder	26 October 1999 (age 27)	5	0	(German Football Association) TSG Hoffenheim

== Competitive record ==
=== FIFA U-20 Women's World Cup ===
The German team has participated in all tournaments until 2024. They have been champions in three opportunities (2004, 2010 and 2014)

Year	Result	Matches	Wins	Draws*	Losses	GF	GA
(Canada) 2002	Third place	6	3	1	2	9	8
(Thailand) 2004	Champions	6	4	2	0	19	5
(Russia) 2006	Quarter-finals	4	2	0	2	16	7
(Chile) 2008	Third place	6	4	0	2	16	9
(Germany) 2010	Champions	6	6	0	0	20	5
(Japan) 2012	Runners-up	6	5	0	1	15	1
(Canada) 2014	Champions	6	5	1	0	17	7
(Papua New Guinea) 2016	Quarter-finals	4	3	0	1	8	2
(France) 2018	Quarter-finals	4	3	0	1	7	5
(Costa Rica) 2022	Group stage	3	1	0	2	3	2
(Colombia) 2024	Quarter-finals	5	3	1	1	15	7
(Poland) 2026	Did not qualify						
Total	11/12	56	39	5	12	145	58

=== UEFA Women's Under-19 Championship ===
The German team has participated in the UEFA Women's Under-19 Championship 19 times; Winning it six times and setting the record for most titles.

Year	Result	Matches	Wins	Draws*	Losses	GF	GA
Two-legged final 1998	Semi-finals	4	2	1	1	5	4
(Sweden) 1999	Runner-up	3	2	0	1	4	2
(France) 2000	Champions	4	3	1	0	9	3
(Norway) 2001	Champions	2	2	0	0	5	2
(Sweden) 2002	Champions	5	5	0	0	10	3
(Germany) 2003	Group stage	3	1	0	2	7	4
(Finland) 2004	Runner-up	5	4	0	1	24	2
(Hungary) 2005	Semi-finals	4	3	0	1	11	6
(Switzerland) 2006	Champions	5	4	1	0	14	1
(Iceland) 2007	Champions	5	5	0	0	13	4
(France) 2008	Semi-finals	4	2	2	0	11	2
(Belarus) 2009	Group stage	3	2	0	1	11	4
(North Macedonia) 2010	Semi-finals	4	3	1	0	12	4
(Italy) 2011	Champions	5	5	0	0	17	4
(Turkey) 2012	Did not qualify						
(Wales) 2013	Semi-finals	4	2	1	1	9	3
(Norway) 2014	Did not qualify						
(Israel) 2015	Semi-finals	4	2	1	1	6	6
(Slovakia) 2016	Group stage	3	1	0	2	5	6
(Northern Ireland) 2017	Semi-finals	4	3	0	1	12	2
(Switzerland) 2018	Runner-up	5	3	0	2	5	2
(Scotland) 2019	Runner-up	5	3	1	1	11	4
(Czech Republic) 2022	Group stage	3	1	0	2	4	4
(Belgium) 2023	Runner-up	5	3	1	1	12	5
(Lithuania) 2024	Group stage	3	1	1	1	3	4
(Poland) 2025	Did not qualify						
Total	20/22	81	57	9	15	201	68

== Head-to-head record ==
The following table shows Germany's head-to-head record in the FIFA U-20 Women's World Cup.

Opponent	Pld	W	D	L	GF	GA	GD	Win %
Argentina	1	1	0	0	5	1	+4	100.00
Australia	1	1	0	0	4	0	+4	100.00
Brazil	4	2	1	1	9	5	+4	50.00
Canada	3	2	1	0	7	4	+3	66.67
China	4	3	1	0	13	5	+8	75.00
Colombia	2	1	0	1	3	2	+1	50.00
Costa Rica	1	1	0	0	4	2	+2	100.00
DR Congo	1	1	0	0	5	0	+5	100.00
France	5	4	0	1	13	6	+7	80.00
Ghana	1	1	0	0	1	0	+1	100.00
Haiti	1	1	0	0	3	2	+1	100.00
Japan	4	2	0	2	7	6	+1	50.00
Mexico	4	3	0	1	15	3	+12	75.00
New Zealand	1	1	0	0	3	0	+3	100.00
Nigeria	5	4	1	0	8	2	+6	80.00
North Korea	2	1	0	1	2	2	+0	50.00
Norway	1	1	0	0	4	0	+4	100.00
South Korea	3	2	0	1	7	2	+5	66.67
Switzerland	1	1	0	0	6	0	+6	100.00
Thailand	1	1	0	0	6	0	+6	100.00
United States	8	3	1	4	12	13	−1	37.50
Venezuela	2	2	0	0	8	3	+5	100.00
Total	56	39	5	12	145	58	+87	69.64

== See also ==
- Germany women's national football team
- Germany women's national under-19 football team
- Germany women's national under-17 football team
- FIFA U-20 Women's World Cup
- UEFA Women's Under-19 Championship
