= Karen Appiah =

Italian footballer (born 2007)

Personal information
- Full name: Karen Appiah Amoakoah
- Date of birth: 23 September 2007 (age 19)
- Place of birth: Brescia, Italy
- Height: 1.69 m (5 ft 7 in)
- Position: Striker

Team information
- Current team: Cesena
- Number: 19

Youth career
- Lumezzane
- 2023–2025: AC Milan

Senior career*
Years	Team	Apps	(Gls)
2025–	AC Milan	2	(0)
2026–	→ Cesena (loan)		

International career
2025–	Italy U20	11	(4)
- * Club domestic league appearances and goals as of 24 September 2026

Karen Appiah Amoakoah (born 23 September 2007) is an Italian professional footballer who plays as a striker for Cesena, on loan from AC Milan, and the Italy under-20 national team.

== Biography ==
=== Club career ===
Appiah started her youth career at Lumezzane. In the summer of 2023, she joined the youth setup of AC Milan. She made her official debut for the senior team on 6 September 2025 in a match against AS Roma. A few days later, she scored her first goal at the professional level against Ternana. In July 2026, AC Milan loaned her to Cesena.

=== International career ===
In August 2026, she was called up to the Italy under-20 team for the 2026 FIFA U-20 Women's World Cup. During the tournament, she finished as Italy's top scorer with four goals.

== Individual honours ==
- Player of the Match Italy vs South Korea at the 2026 FIFA U-20 Women's World Cup
