= Jo Hye-young =

South Korean footballer (born 2006)

Personal information
- Date of birth: 18 February 2006 (age 20)
- Place of birth: South Korea
- Height: 1.61 m (5 ft 3 in)
- Position: Forward

Team information
- Current team: Madrid CFF

Youth career
- Oju Middle School
- Gwangyang Girls' High School

College career
Years	Team	Apps	(Gls)
2025–2026	Korea University		

Senior career*
Years	Team	Apps	(Gls)
2026–	Madrid CFF		

International career
- South Korea U20
- * Club domestic league appearances and goals as of 22 June 2025

Jo Hye-young (Korean: 조혜영; born 18 February 2006) is a South Korean footballer who plays as a forward for Madrid CFF.

== Early life ==
Jo was born on 18 February 2006. Born in South Korea, she is a native of Jinju, South Korea. Growing up, she attended Oju Middle School in South Korea.

Following her stint there, she attended Gwangyang Girls' High School in South Korea. Subsequently, she attended Korea University in South Korea.

== Club career ==
In 2026, Jo signed for Spanish side Madrid CFF, becoming the third South Korean player to sign for the club.

== International career ==
Jo is a South Korea youth international. During the spring of 2024, she played for the South Korea women's national under-20 football team at the 2024 AFC U-20 Women's Asian Cup. The same year, she played for the South Korea women's national under-20 football team at the 2024 FIFA U-20 Women's World Cup, where she was the team's youngest player.

Two years later, she played for the South Korea women's national under-20 football team at the 2026 AFC U-20 Women's Asian Cup, where she captained the team before playing for the South Korea women's national under-20 football team at the 2026 FIFA U-20 Women's World Cup.

== Style of play ==
Jo plays as a forward. News website FIFA wrote in 2026 that she is "a winger capable of playing on either flank; she is an attacker who favors bold one-on-one dribbling, crossing, and cutting inside toward the center".
