= Marísa García =

Spanish footballer (born 2006)

Personal information
- Full name: María Luisa García Antolín
- Date of birth: 22 June 2006 (age 20)
- Place of birth: Madrid, Spain
- Position: Forward

Team information
- Current team: Deportivo A Coruña

Youth career
- 2011–2016: San Agustín
- 2016–2020: Madrid CFF B
- 2020–2022: Real Madrid

Senior career*
Years	Team	Apps	(Gls)
2022–2026	Real Madrid B	57	(28)
2023–2026	Real Madrid	3	(0)
2025–2026	→ Deportivo A Coruña (loan)	26	(2)
2026–	Deportivo A Coruña	0	(0)

International career
2023–2024	Spain U17		
2024–	Spain U19		
Medal record
Women's football
Representing Spain
FIFA U-20 Women's World Cup
Winner	2026 Poland
UEFA Women's Under-19 Championship
Winner	2024 Lithuania
Winner	2025 Poland
UEFA Women's Under-17 Championship
Runner-up	2023 Estonia
- * Club domestic league appearances and goals as of 08:50, 14 July 2026 (UTC)

María Luisa García Antolín (born 22 June 2006) is a Spanish professional footballer who plays as a forward for Liga F club Deportivo A Coruña.

== Club career ==
=== San Agustín ===
In 2011, García joined San Agustín and played for them until 2016.

=== Madrid CFF B ===
She joined Madrid CFF B in 2016 and played for them until 2020.

=== Real Madrid ===
García moved to Real Madrid in 2020. She was promoted to the first team in 2023.

=== Deportivo de La Coruña ===
She was loaned to Deportivo A Coruña in 2025.

== International career ==
=== Spain U17 ===
She played in 2023 UEFA Women's Under-17 Championship against Estonia where she scored three goals.

=== Spain U19 ===
García played for Spain in the 2024 UEFA Women's Under-19 Championship where he scored a goal in the final.

In 2025, she played in 2025 UEFA Women's Under-19 Championship.

== Honours ==
Real Madrid B

- Segunda Federacion: 2023–24

Spain U17

- UEFA Women's Under-17 Championship runner-up: 2023

Spain U19

- UEFA Women's Under-19 Championship: 2024, 2025

Spain U20

- FIFA U-20 Women's World Cup: 2026
