= Heini Hyvönen =

Finnish football assistant referee

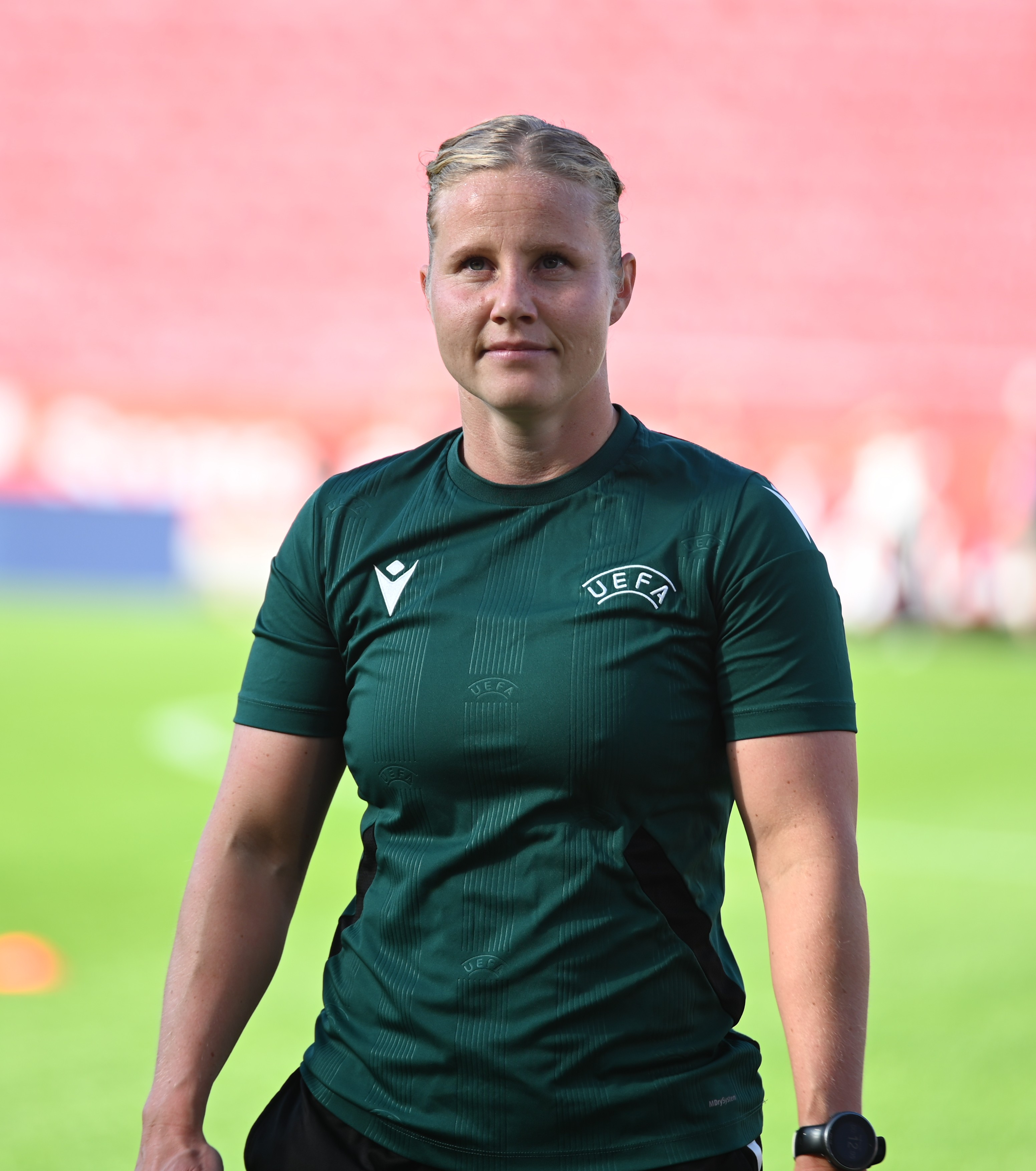
- Born: 12 March 1994 (age 32); Mikkeli, Finland

Domestic
Years	League	Role
2018–	Naisten Liiga/ Kakkonen	Assistant referee
2022–	Ykkönen	Assistant referee
2023–	Veikkausliiga	Assistant referee

International
Years	League	Role
2018–	FIFA listed	Assistant referee

Heini Hyvönen (born 12 March 1994) is a Finnish international football assistant referee.

== Career ==
Hyvönen has played football in Porrassalmen Urheilijat -62.

She started as assistant referee in 2009. In 2014, she first refereed in Finnish women's top tier Naisten Liiga and men's third tier Kakkonen.

On 8 July 2023, Hyvönen made history as the first female referee in men's top tier Veikkausliiga, when she named an assistant referee in a match between HJK Helsinki and Lahti.

In April 2025, Hyvönen was named an assistant referee for the UEFA Women's Euro 2025 final tournament.

== Personal life ==
Hyvönen is a teacher by profession.
