= Japan women's national under-20 football team =

National association football youth team of Japan

Japan
- Nickname: Young Nadeshiko (ヤングなでしこ)
- Association: JFA
- Confederation: AFC
- Sub-confederation: EAFF
- Head coach: Ijiri Akira
First colours	Second colours

FIFA U-20 Women's World Cup
- Appearances: 9 (first in 2002)
- Best result: Champions (2018)

AFC U-20 Women's Asian Cup
- Appearances: 12 (first in 2002)
- Best result: Champions (2002, 2009, 2011, 2015, 2017, 2019, 2026)

The Japan women's national under-20 football team is a national association football youth team of Japan and is controlled by the Japan Football Association.

The nickname of team is the Young Nadeshiko (ヤングなでしこ).

== Results and fixtures ==
Legend

Win Draw Lose Fixture

== Coaching staff ==
=== Current coaching staff ===
As of 18 April 2026

Role	Name
Head coach	(Japan) Ijiri Akira (JFA National Coaching Staff)
Assistant coach	(Japan) Tomomi Miyamoto (JFA National Coaching Staff)
Technical staff	(Japan) Kensuke Teraguchi (JFA National Coaching Staff)
Goalkeeping coach	(Japan) Toshihiro Nishiiri (JFA National Coaching Staff)
Physical coach	(Japan) Keisuke Otsuka (JFA National Coaching Staff)

== Players ==
=== Current U-20 squad ===
The following players were called up for the 2024 FIFA U-20 Women's World Cup, held in Colombia in August 2024.

No.	Pos.	Player	Date of birth (age)	Caps	Goals	Club
1	GK	Akane Okuma	15 September 2004 (aged 19)			(Japan Football Association) INAC Kobe Leonessa
2	DF	Nana Kashimura	15 April 2004 (aged 20)			(Japan Football Association) NTV Tokyo Verdy Beleza
3	DF	Raika Okamura	30 July 2005 (aged 19)			(Japan Football Association) Urawa Red Diamonds
4	DF	Hiromi Yoneda	2 October 2004 (aged 19)			(Japan Football Association) Cerezo Osaka Yanmar
5	MF	Manaka Hayashi (captain)	16 August 2004 (aged 20)			(United States Soccer Federation) Santa Clara Broncos
6	DF	Rio Sasaki	17 September 2004 (aged 19)			(Japan Football Association) Mynavi Sendai
7	MF	Fuka Tsunoda	24 October 2004 (aged 19)			(Japan Football Association) Urawa Red Diamonds
8	MF	Aemu Oyama	19 September 2004 (aged 19)			(Japan Football Association) Waseda University
9	FW	Chinari Sasai	12 October 2004 (aged 19)			(Japan Football Association) Nojima Stella Kanagawa Sagamihara
10	FW	Manaka Matsukubo	28 July 2004 (aged 20)			(United States Soccer Federation) North Carolina Courage
11	MF	Rihona Ujihara	8 July 2004 (aged 20)			(Japan Football Association) NTV Tokyo Verdy Beleza
12	MF	Mao Kubota	30 May 2005 (aged 19)			(Japan Football Association) INAC Kobe Leonessa
13	FW	Maya Hijikata	13 April 2004 (aged 20)			(Japan Football Association) NTV Tokyo Verdy Beleza
14	DF	Shinomi Koyama	31 January 2005 (aged 19)			(Swedish Football Association) Djurgården
15	MF	Miku Hayama	14 May 2005 (aged 19)			(Japan Football Association) Sanfrecce Hiroshima Regina
16	MF	Suzu Amano	18 February 2004 (aged 20)			(Swedish Football Association) Hammarby
17	DF	Uno Shiragaki	11 October 2005 (aged 18)			(Japan Football Association) Cerezo Osaka Yanmar
18	GK	Uruha Iwasaki	13 March 2006 (aged 18)			(Japan Football Association) Nojima Stella Kanagawa Sagamihara
19	MF	Miyu Matsunaga	8 June 2006 (aged 18)			(Japan Football Association) NTV Tokyo Verdy Beleza
20	MF	Mao Itamura	6 August 2006 (aged 18)			(Japan Football Association) JFA Academy Fukushima
21	GK	Jessica Yuri Wulf	20 May 2005 (aged 19)			(Japan Football Association) NTV Tokyo Verdy Beleza

=== Previous squads ===
FIFA U-20 World Cup

- 2002 FIFA U-19 World Championship
- 2008 FIFA U-20 World Cup
- 2010 FIFA U-20 World Cup
- 2012 FIFA U-20 World Cup
- 2016 FIFA U-20 World Cup
- 2018 FIFA U-20 World Cup
- 2022 FIFA U-20 World Cup
- 2024 FIFA U-20 World Cup

AFC U-20 Women's Asian Cup

== Competitive record ==
=== FIFA U-20 Women's World Cup ===
Year	Result	Pld	W	D*	L	GF	GA
(Canada) 2002	Quarter-finals	4	1	1	2	4	8
(Thailand) 2004	Did not qualify						
(Russia) 2006	Did not qualify						
(Chile) 2008	Quarter-finals	4	3	0	1	8	4
(Germany) 2010	Group stage	3	1	1	1	7	6
(Japan) 2012	Third place	6	4	1	1	15	8
(Canada) 2014	Did not qualify						
(Papua New Guinea) 2016	Third place	6	4	0	2	16	4
(France) 2018	Champions	6	5	0	1	15	3
(Costa Rica) 2022	Runners-up	6	4	1	1	12	8
(Colombia) 2024	Runners-up	7	6	0	1	18	3
(Poland) 2026	Round of 16	4	1	2	1	5	6
Total	9/12	46	29	6	11	100	50

* Draws include knockout matches decided on penalty kicks.

FIFA U-20 Women's World Cup history
Year	Round	Score	Result
2002	Group stage	Japan 1–1 Nigeria	Draw
2002	Group stage	Japan 0–4 Canada	Loss
2002	Group stage	Japan 2–1 Denmark	Win
2002	Quarter-finals	Japan 1–2 Germany	Loss
2008	Group stage	Japan 2–0 Canada	Win
2008	Group stage	Japan 2–1 Germany	Win
2008	Group stage	Japan 3–1 DR Congo	Win
2008	Quarter-finals	Japan 1–2 North Korea	Loss
2010	Group stage	Japan 3–3 Mexico	Draw
2010	Group stage	Japan 1–2 Nigeria	Loss
2010	Group stage	Japan 3–1 England	Win
2012	Group stage	Japan 4–1 Mexico	Win
2012	Group stage	Japan 2–2 New Zealand	Draw
2012	Group stage	Japan 4–0 Switzerland	Win
2012	Quarter-finals	Japan 3–1 South Korea	Win
2012	Semi-finals	Japan 0–3 Germany	Loss
2012	Third place match	Japan 2–1 Nigeria	Win
2016	Group stage	Japan 6–0 Nigeria	Win
2016	Group stage	Japan 0–1 Spain	Loss
2016	Group stage	Japan 5–0 Canada	Win
2016	Quarter-finals	Japan 3–1 Brazil	Win
2016	Semi-finals	Japan 1–2 France	Loss *
2016	Third place match	Japan 1–0 United States	Win
2018	Group stage	Japan 1–0 United States	Win
2018	Group stage	Japan 0–1 Spain	Loss
2018	Group stage	Japan 6–0 Paraguay	Win
2018	Quarter-finals	Japan 3–1 Germany	Win
2018	Semi-finals	Japan 2–0 England	Win
2018	Final	Japan 3–1 Spain	Win
2022	Group stage	Japan 1–0 Netherlands	Win
2022	Group stage	Japan 2–0 Ghana	Win
2022	Group stage	Japan 3–1 United States	Win
2022	Quarter-finals	Japan 3–3 France	Draw*
2022	Semi-finals	Japan 2–1 Brazil	Win
2022	Final	Japan 1–3 Spain	Loss
2024	Group stage	Japan 7–0 New Zealand	Win
2024	Group stage	Japan 4–1 Ghana	Win
2024	Group stage	Japan 2–0 Austria	Win
2024	Round of 16	Japan 2–1 Nigeria	Win
2024	Quarter-finals	Japan 1–0 Spain	Win
2024	Semi-finals	Japan 2–0 Netherlands	Win
2024	Final	Japan 0–1 North Korea	Loss
2026	Group stage	Japan 2–1 New Zealand	Win
2026	Group stage	Japan 2–2 United States	Draw
2026	Group stage	Japan 1–1 Italy	Draw
2026	Round of 16	Japan 0–2 North Korea	Loss

* (2016) France win after extra time.
* (2022) Japan won after winning on penalty shoot-out.

=== AFC U-20 Women's Asian Cup ===
AFC U-20 Women's Asian Cup								Qualification					
Hosts / Year	Result	M	W	D	L	GF	GA	M	W	D	L	GF	GA
(India) 2002	Champions	5	4	1	0	34	2	no qualification					
(China) 2004	Quarterfinals	3	2	0	1	28	1	no qualification					
(Malaysia) 2006	Fourth place	5	3	1	1	14	5	2	2	0	0	18	1
(China) 2007	Runners-up	5	2	1	2	10	4	automatically qualified					
(China) 2009	Champions	5	3	2	0	10	3	automatically qualified					
(Vietnam) 2011	Champions	5	4	1	0	13	3	automatically qualified					
(China) 2013	Fourth place	5	2	2	1	11	4	automatically qualified					
(China) 2015	Champions	5	4	1	0	12	2	automatically qualified					
(China) 2017	Champions	5	5	0	0	21	1	automatically qualified					
(Thailand) 2019	Champions	5	5	0	0	18	2	automatically qualified					
(Uzbekistan) 2024	Runners-up	5	3	0	2	18	4	automatically qualified					
(Thailand) 2026	Champions	6	6	0	0	20	2	3	3	0	0	32	0
Total:12/12	7 Titles	59	43	9	7	209	33	5	5	0	0	50	1

=== Sud Ladies Cup ===
(France) Sud Ladies Cup record
Year	Result	GP	W	D	L	GS	GA	GD
2019	Runners-up	5	4	0	1	18	3	+15

== Head-to-head record ==
The following table shows Japan's head-to-head record in the FIFA U-20 Women's World Cup and AFC U-20 Women's Asian Cup.

=== In FIFA U-20 Women's World Cup ===
Opponent	Pld	W	D	L	GF	GA	GD	Win %
Austria	1	1	0	0	2	0	+2	100.00
Brazil	2	2	0	0	5	2	+3	100.00
Canada	3	2	0	1	7	4	+3	66.67
Denmark	1	1	0	0	2	1	+1	100.00
DR Congo	1	1	0	0	3	1	+2	100.00
England	2	2	0	0	5	1	+4	100.00
France	2	0	1	1	4	5	−1	0.00
Germany	4	2	0	2	6	7	−1	50.00
Ghana	2	2	0	0	6	1	+5	100.00
Italy	1	0	1	0	1	1	+0	0.00
Mexico	2	1	1	0	7	4	+3	50.00
Netherlands	2	2	0	0	3	0	+3	100.00
New Zealand	3	2	1	0	11	3	+8	66.67
Nigeria	5	3	1	1	12	5	+7	60.00
North Korea	3	0	0	3	1	5	−4	0.00
Paraguay	1	1	0	0	6	0	+6	100.00
South Korea	1	1	0	0	3	1	+2	100.00
Spain	5	2	0	3	5	6	−1	40.00
Switzerland	1	1	0	0	4	0	+4	100.00
United States	4	3	1	0	7	3	+4	75.00
Total	46	29	6	11	100	50	+50	63.04

=== In AFC U-20 Women's Asian Cup ===
Opponent	Pld	W	D	L	GF	GA	GD	Win %
Australia	10	8	1	1	31	8	+23	80.00
China	10	4	5	1	18	10	+8	40.00
Chinese Taipei	3	3	0	0	9	1	+8	100.00
Guam	1	1	0	0	15	0	+15	100.00
India	3	3	0	0	21	0	+21	100.00
Malaysia	1	1	0	0	24	0	+24	100.00
Myanmar	3	3	0	0	20	0	+20	100.00
North Korea	11	5	2	4	11	9	+2	45.45
South Korea	9	7	1	1	19	5	+14	77.78
Uzbekistan	1	1	0	0	6	0	+6	100.00
Vietnam	5	5	0	0	32	0	+32	100.00
Total	57	41	9	7	206	33	+173	71.93

== See also ==
Women's

- International footballers
- National football team (Results)
- National under-20 football team
- National under-17 football team
- National futsal team

Men's

- International footballers
- National football team (Results (2020–present))
- National under-23 football team
- National under-20 football team
- National under-17 football team
- National futsal team
- National under-20 futsal team
- National beach soccer team
