= North Korea women's national under-20 football team =

National association football team

(North Korea) Korea DPR
- Association: DPR Korea Football Association
- Confederation: AFC (Asia)
- Sub-confederation: EAFF (East Asia)
- Head coach: Han Chol-hak
- Captain: Pak Ok-i
- FIFA code: PRK
First colours	Second colours

AFC U-20 Women's Asian Cup
- Appearances: 12 (first in 2002)
- Best result: Champions (2007, 2024)

FIFA U-20 Women's World Cup
- Appearances: 9 (first in 2006)
- Best result: Champions (2006, 2016, 2024)
Medal record
FIFA U-20 Women's World Cup
Gold medal – first place	2006 Russia
Gold medal – first place	2016 Papua New Guinea
Gold medal – first place	2024 Colombia
Silver medal – second place	2008 Chile
Silver medal – second place	2026 Poland
AFC U-20 Women's Asian Cup
Gold medal – first place	2007 China
Gold medal – first place	2024 Uzbekistan
Silver medal – second place	2006 Malaysia
Silver medal – second place	2006 Vietnam
Silver medal – second place	2013 China
Silver medal – second place	2015 China
Silver medal – second place	2017 China
Silver medal – second place	2019 Thailand
Bronze medal – third place	2004 China
Bronze medal – third place	2009 China

The North Korea women's national under-20 football team represents the Democratic People's Republic of Korea in international association football competitions in the FIFA U-20 Women's World Cup, the AFC U-20 Women's Asian Cup, and other under-20 women's international football tournaments. The team is governed by the DPR Korea Football Association.

They have won the FIFA U-20 Women's World Cup three times, in 2006, 2016 and 2024. Upon the former triumph, they became the first Asian team to win a FIFA women's tournament and the first Asian football team to win any FIFA tournaments since Saudi Arabia's victory in the 1989 FIFA U-16 World Championship.

They have also won the AFC U-20 Women's Asian Cup twice, in 2007 and again in 2024.

== Competitive record ==
=== FIFA U-20 Women's World Cup ===
Year	Round	Pld	W	D*	L	GF	GA
(Canada) 2002	Did not qualify						
(Thailand) 2004	Did not qualify						
(Russia) 2006	Champions	6	6	0	0	18	1
(Chile) 2008	Runners-up	6	4	0	2	15	10
(Germany) 2010	Quarter-finals	4	2	0	2	5	6
(Japan) 2012	Quarter-finals	4	3	0	1	16	5
(Canada) 2014	Fourth place	6	2	1	3	10	12
(Papua New Guinea) 2016	Champions	6	6	0	0	21	7
(France) 2018	Quarter-finals	4	2	0	2	5	6
(Costa Rica) 2022	Withdrew						
(Colombia) 2024	Champions	7	7	0	0	25	4
(Poland) 2026	Runners-up	7	6	1	0	16	0
Total:9/12	3 Titles	50	38	2	10	131	51

*Draws include knockout matches decided on penalty kicks.

=== AFC U-20 Women's Asian Cup ===
AFC U-20 Women's Asian Cup record
Year	Round	Position	Pld	W	D*	L	GF	GA
(India) 2002	Fourth place	4th	5	3	1	1	20	5
(China) 2004	Third place	3rd	6	5	1	0	51	1
(Malaysia) 2006	Runners-up	2nd	5	3	0	2	20	7
(China) 2007	Champions	1st	5	5	0	0	13	3
(China) 2009	Third place	3rd	5	4	0	1	14	1
(Vietnam) 2011	Runners-up	2nd	5	4	0	1	13	3
(China) 2013	Runners-up	2nd	5	3	1	1	10	4
(China) 2015	Runners-up	2nd	5	4	1	0	17	0
(China) 2017	Runners-up	2nd	5	4	0	1	16	1
(Thailand) 2019	Runners-up	2nd	5	4	0	1	15	5
(Uzbekistan) 2024	Champions	1st	5	4	1	0	13	2
(Thailand) 2026	Runners-up	2nd	6	5	0	1	25	1
Total:12/12	2 Titles		62	48	5	9	227	33

== Current squad ==
The following 23 players were called up for the 2026 AFC U-20 Women's Asian Cup in Thailand.

- Caps and goals are updated as of April 3, 2026 after the final match against Jordan.

No.	Pos.	Player	Date of birth (age)	Club
1	GK	Pak Ju-gyong	7 November 2007 (aged 18)	(DPR Korea Football Association) Naegohyang
2	FW	Kim Ju-hyang	11 November 2006 (aged 19)	(DPR Korea Football Association) Pyongyang
3	DF	Jong Pok-yong	20 January 2007 (aged 19)	(DPR Korea Football Association) February 8
5	DF	Ri Ye-gyong	10 November 2007 (aged 18)	(DPR Korea Football Association) February 8
6	MF	Pak Ok-i (captain)	12 April 2007 (aged 18)	(DPR Korea Football Association) February 8
7	MF	Jon Il-chong	12 March 2007 (aged 19)	(DPR Korea Football Association) Amnokgang
8	MF	So Ryu-gyong	10 November 2007 (aged 18)	(DPR Korea Football Association) Amnokgang
9	FW	Ri Su-jong	7 January 2007 (aged 19)	(DPR Korea Football Association) Naegohyang
10	FW	Choe Yon-a	1 January 2007 (aged 19)	(DPR Korea Football Association) Naegohyang
11	FW	Choe Rim-jong	27 January 2007 (aged 19)	(DPR Korea Football Association) Amnokgang
12	FW	Kang Ryu-mi	20 September 2007 (aged 18)	(DPR Korea Football Association) Rimyongsu
13	FW	Ho Kyong	28 February 2007 (aged 19)	(DPR Korea Football Association) February 8
14	DF	Pak Il-sim	20 May 2007 (aged 18)	(DPR Korea Football Association) Amnokgang
15	DF	Choe Chong-gum	15 September 2007 (aged 18)	(DPR Korea Football Association) February 8
16	DF	Yom Chol-nim	13 January 2007 (aged 19)	(DPR Korea Football Association) Wolmido
17	DF	Ri Kuk-hyang	7 October 2007 (aged 18)	(DPR Korea Football Association) Naegohyang
18	GK	Choe Kyong-mi	17 July 2007 (aged 18)	(DPR Korea Football Association) Amnokgang
19	MF	Ro Un-hyang	18 May 2007 (aged 18)	(DPR Korea Football Association) Naegohyang
20	MF	An Kyong-yong	27 August 2007 (aged 18)	(DPR Korea Football Association) February 8
21	GK	Ri Ok	5 January 2006 (aged 20)	(DPR Korea Football Association) February 8
23	MF	Ri Pom	3 March 2007 (aged 19)	(DPR Korea Football Association) Naegohyang

=== Recent call-ups ===
The following players have been called up for the team within the last 12 months and are still available for selection.

Pos.	Player	Date of birth (age)	Caps	Goals	Club	Latest call-up

== Honours ==
FIFA U-20 Women's World Cup

- (gold) Champions: 2006, 2016, 2024
- (silver) Runners-up: 2008

AFC U-20 Women's Asian Cup

- (gold) Champions: 2007, 2024
- (silver) Runners-up: 2006, 2011, 2013, 2015, 2017, 2019
- (bronze) Third place: 2004, 2009

== Head-to-head record ==
The following table shows North Korea's head-to-head record in the FIFA U-20 Women's World Cup and AFC U-20 Women's Asian Cup.

=== In FIFA U-20 Women's World Cup ===
Opponent	Pld	W	D	L	GF	GA	GD	Win %
Argentina	2	2	0	0	15	2	+13	100.00
Austria	1	1	0	0	5	2	+3	100.00
Brazil	6	5	0	1	11	6	+5	83.33
Canada	2	1	0	1	2	2	+0	50.00
China	1	1	0	0	5	0	+5	100.00
Colombia	1	1	0	0	3	0	+3	100.00
Costa Rica	2	2	0	0	13	0	+13	100.00
England	1	0	0	1	1	3	−2	0.00
Finland	1	1	0	0	2	1	+1	100.00
France	5	3	0	2	9	7	+2	60.00
Germany	2	1	0	1	2	2	+0	50.00
Ghana	1	1	0	0	3	0	+3	100.00
Japan	3	3	0	0	5	1	+4	100.00
Mexico	3	3	0	0	11	2	+9	100.00
Netherlands	1	1	0	0	2	0	+2	100.00
New Zealand	1	1	0	0	2	1	+1	100.00
Nigeria	1	0	0	1	2	6	−4	0.00
Norway	2	2	0	0	7	4	+3	100.00
Papua New Guinea	1	1	0	0	7	1	+6	100.00
Portugal	1	1	0	0	2	0	+2	100.00
Spain	1	1	0	0	3	2	+1	100.00
Sweden	2	1	0	1	4	3	+1	50.00
Switzerland	1	1	0	0	4	0	+4	100.00
United States	5	2	1	2	6	6	+0	40.00
Total	47	36	1	10	126	51	+75	76.60

=== In AFC U-20 Women's Asian Cup ===
Opponent	Pld	W	D	L	GF	GA	GD	Win %
Australia	6	6	0	0	21	6	+15	100.00
China	10	6	2	2	17	8	+9	60.00
Chinese Taipei	1	0	1	0	1	1	+0	0.00
India	2	2	0	0	24	0	+24	100.00
Iran	1	1	0	0	9	0	+9	100.00
Japan	11	4	2	5	9	11	−2	36.36
Myanmar	3	3	0	0	12	0	+12	100.00
Nepal	1	1	0	0	19	0	+19	100.00
South Korea	7	6	0	1	15	5	+10	85.71
Thailand	7	7	0	0	39	1	+38	100.00
Uzbekistan	3	3	0	0	16	0	+16	100.00
Vietnam	4	4	0	0	20	0	+20	100.00
Total	56	43	5	8	202	32	+170	76.79

== See also ==
- North Korea women's national football team
- North Korea women's national under-17 football team
