= Bielsko-Biała Stadium =

Football stadium, Poland

Coordinates: 49°49′03″N 19°03′15″E

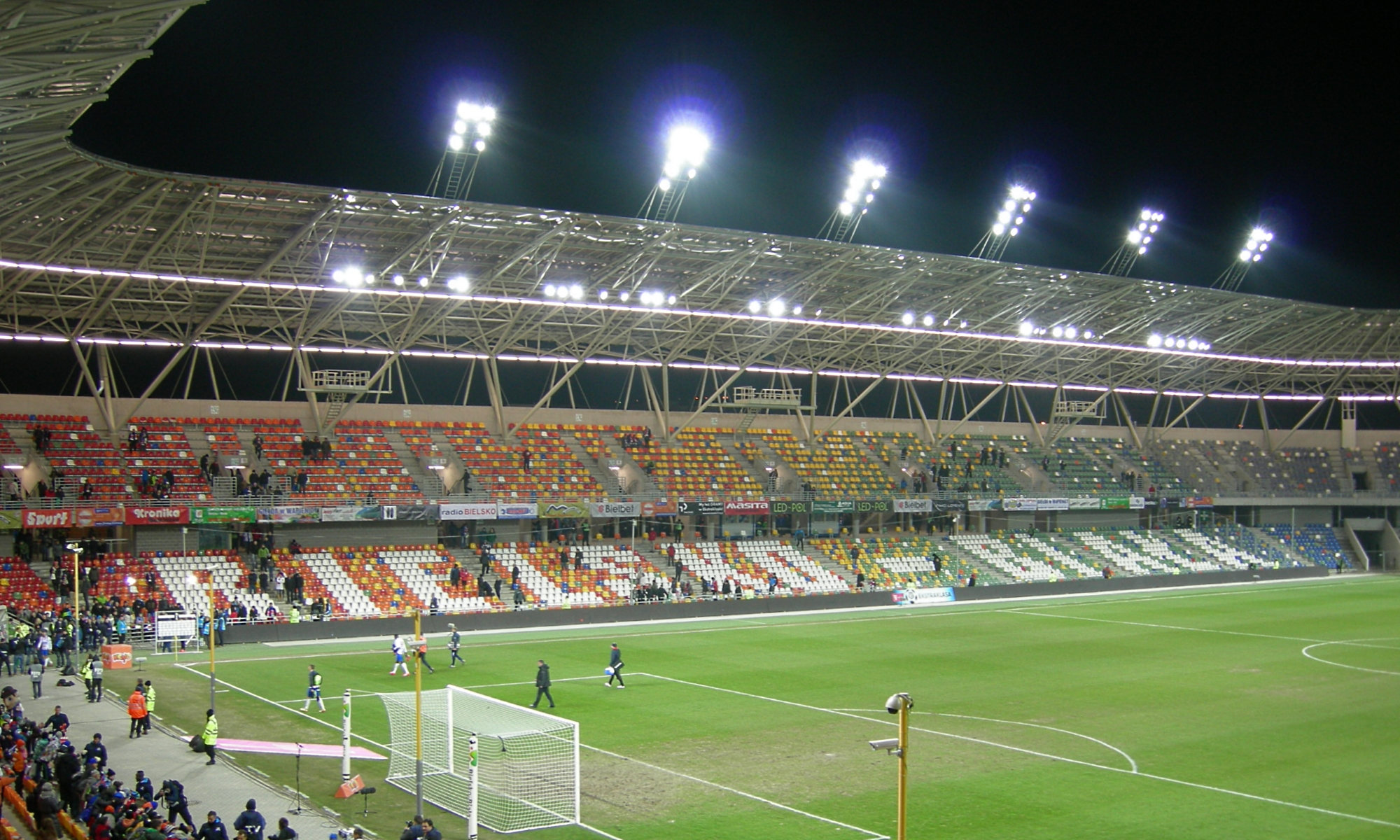
- Interactive map of Bielsko-Biała Stadium
- Location: Ulica Rychlińskiego 21, Bielsko-Biała, Poland
- Operator: Bielsko-Bialski Ośrodek Sportu i Rekreacji (BBOSiR)
- Capacity: 15,076
- Record attendance: 13,745 (Poland U-20 v. England U-20, 23 March 2018)

Construction
- Opened: 1927
- Renovated: 2012–2015

Tenants
- Podbeskidzie Bielsko-Biała; BKS Stal Bielsko Biała: Major sporting events hosted; 1978 UEFA European Under-18 Championship 2019 FIFA U-20 World Cup

Stadion Miejski w Bielsku-Białej (English: Bielsko-Biała Municipal Stadium) is a football stadium in Bielsko-Biała, Poland. It is the home ground of Podbeskidzie Bielsko-Biała (since 1999) and BKS Stal Bielsko-Biała.

The stadium is also known as the Stadion Podbeskidzia Bielsko-Biała (English: Podbeskidzie Bielsko-Biała Stadium) in connection with its most common host. Sometimes the stadium is called Stadion BBOSiR (English: BBOSiR Stadium) after the facility operator, but in fact the above-mentioned name refers to the stadium at ul. Młyńska 52 in Bielsko-Biała.

== History ==
It was built in 1927, reconstructed 30 years later and rebuilt in 2015. Now the stadium is football-specific, although in the past it had athletic track. Since August 2012 venue was under another reconstruction that cost 75 million zł. The stadium was finished in June 2015 (although officially opened in October 2016) and its capacity increased to 14,993 seats.

== International events ==
The stadium hosted two matches of 1978 UEFA European Under-18 Championship and several matches of the 2019 FIFA U-20 World Cup.
