= Władysław Król Municipal Stadium =

Football stadium in Łódź, Poland

Coordinates: 51°45′27.5″N 19°25′39″E

- Stadion ŁKS
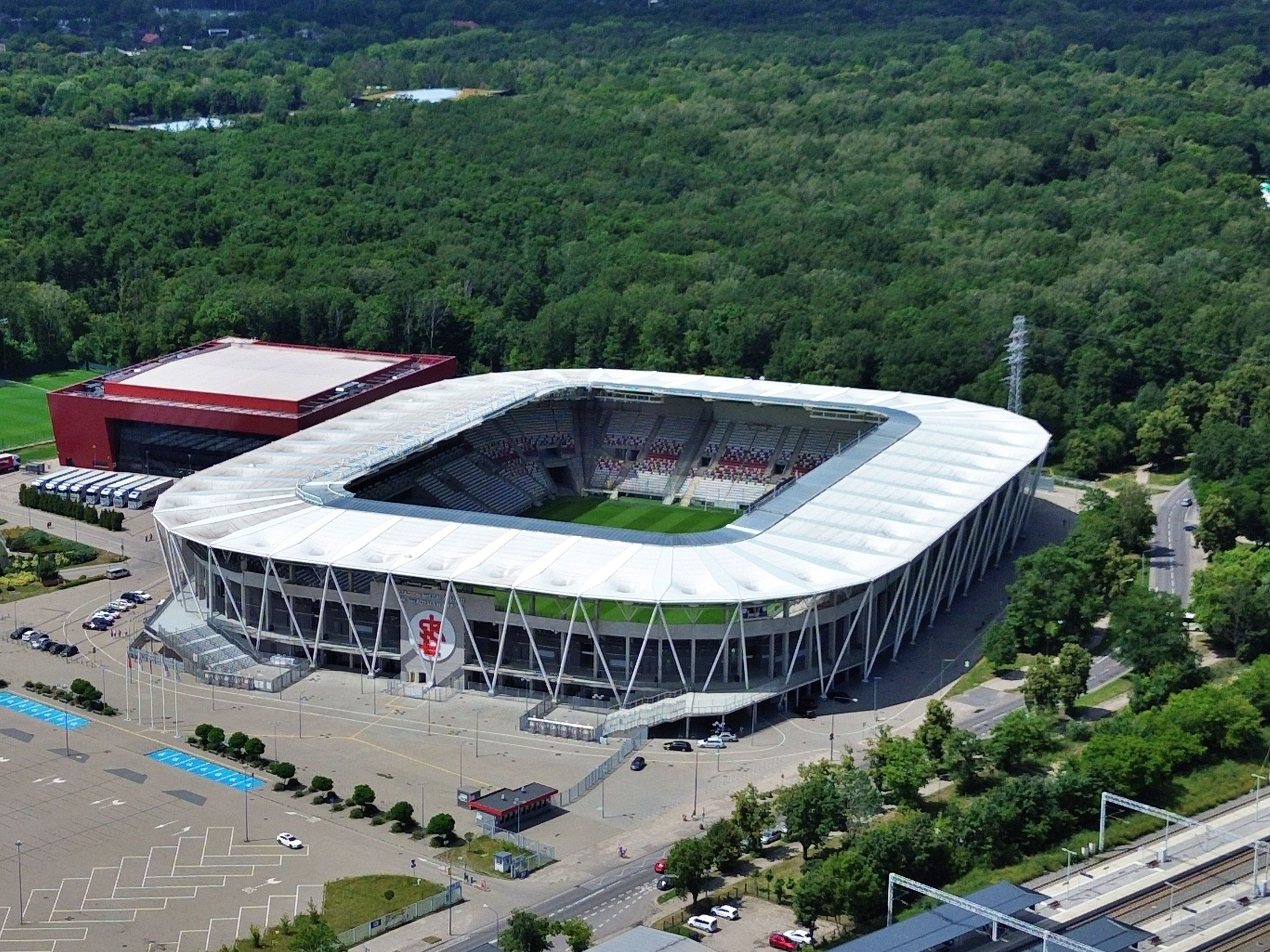
- Interactive map of Władysław Król Municipal Stadium
- Location: Łódź, Poland
- Owner: Łódź City Council
- Capacity: 18,029
- Surface: Grass
- Field size: 105 m × 68 m (344 ft × 223 ft)

Construction
- Opened: 1924; 2022

Tenant
- ŁKS Łódź

The Władysław Król Municipal Stadium (Polish: Stadion Miejski im. Władysława Króla), also known as the Stadion Miejski ŁKS Łódź (English: ŁKS Łódź Municipal Stadium), is a football stadium in Łódź, Poland. The stadium has a capacity of 18,029 seats.

== History ==
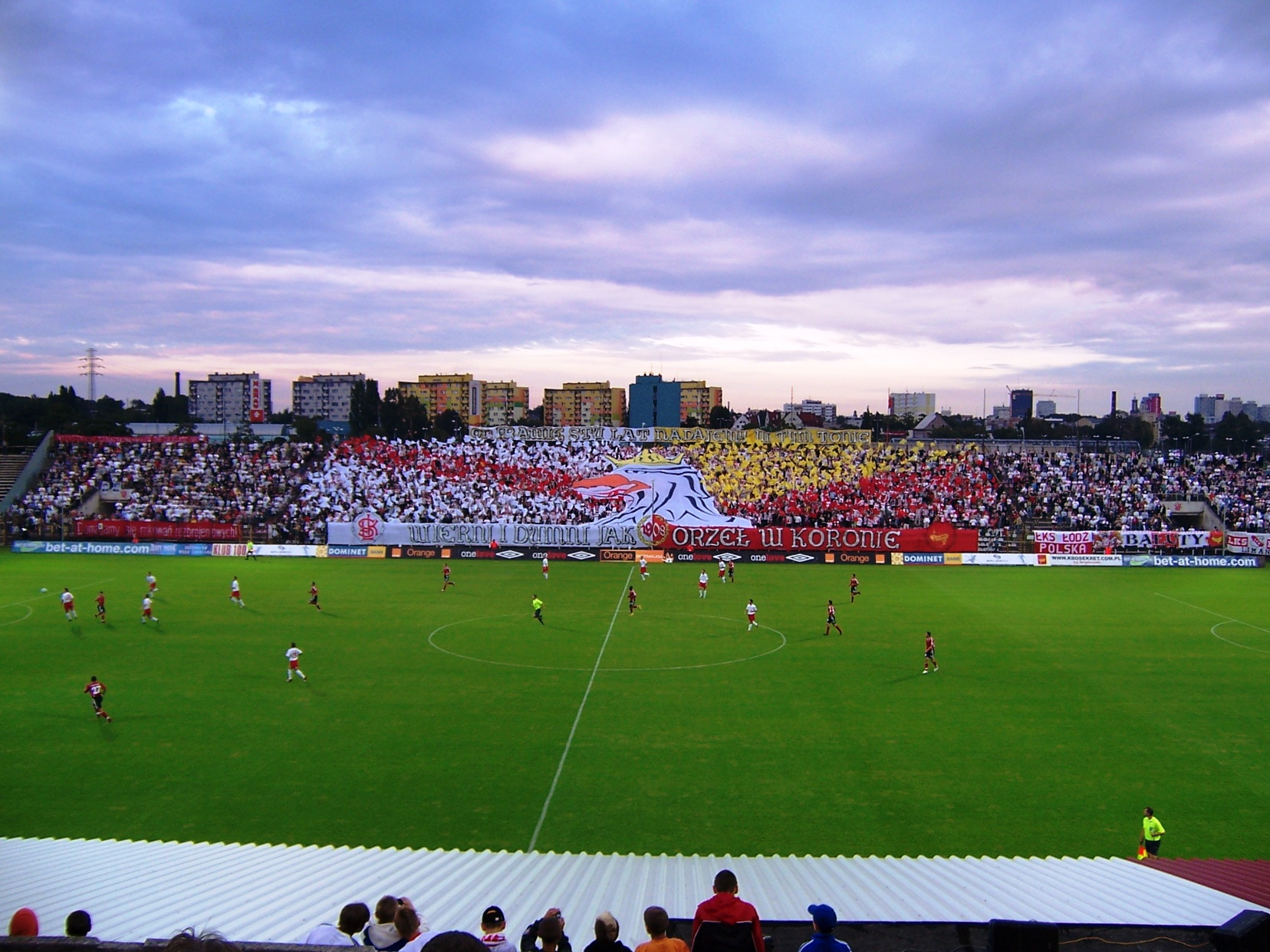
The original ground

The ground has hosted football games since 1924. The original stadium, built for association football club ŁKS Łódź, had a combination of grandstands and standing areas, and hosted a maximum crowd of 45,000 on August 21, 1971, when ŁKS Łódź and Polonia Bytom played to a 0–0 draw. The stands were renovated at various times, and by 2001 the field had seating for 12,160 fans, in sections built in various time periods.

A new stadium was planned on the same site. In November 2013 a contract was finally signed to begin construction of the new stadium with Mirbud, with completion within 20 months. Initially only one stand with a capacity of 5,700 seats was built.

The construction of the remaining three tribunes started in September 2019. The completed stadium was opened in 2022.

On 24 May 2021, the President of the City of Łódź Hanna Zdanowska signed a bylaw granting the Municipal Stadium named after pre-war footballer and hockey player Władysław Król.

The stadium hosted twenty matches of 2026 FIFA U-20 Women's World Cup, including the final; as a part of the four host cities.
