= Italy women's national under-19 football team =

National association football team

Italy Women's U-19
- Association: Italian Football Federation
- Confederation: UEFA (Europe)
- Head coach: Nicola Matteucci
- FIFA code: ITA

First international
- Netherlands 0–2 Italy, (15 April 2003)

Biggest win
- Cyprus 0–11 Italy, (17 September 2015)

Biggest defeat
- Italy 1–7 Iceland, (7 March 2020)

UEFA Women's Under-19 Championship
- Appearances: 11 (first in 2003)
- Best result: Winners (2008)

FIFA U-20 Women's World Cup
- Appearances: 3 (first in 2004)
- Best result: Fourth place (2026)

The Italian women's national under-19 football team represents Italy at the UEFA Women's Under-19 Championship and the FIFA U-20 Women's World Cup.

== Competitive record ==
=== FIFA U-20 Women's World Cup ===
Year	Result	Pld	W	D*	L	GF	GA
(Canada) 2002	Did not qualify						
(Thailand) 2004	Group stage	3	0	1	2	3	5
(Russia) 2006	Did not qualify						
(Chile) 2008	Did not qualify						
(Germany) 2010	Did not qualify						
(Japan) 2012	Group stage	3	0	1	2	1	7
(Canada) 2014	Did not qualify						
(Papua New Guinea) 2016	Did not qualify						
(France) 2018	Did not qualify						
(Costa Rica) 2022	Did not qualify						
(Colombia) 2024	Did not qualify						
(Poland) 2026	Fourth place	7	3	3	1	11	7
Total	3/12	13	3	5	5	15	19

*Draws include knockout matches decided on penalty kicks.

=== UEFA Women's Under-19 Championship ===
The Italian team has qualified for the UEFA Women's Under-19 Championship eight times, with their best performance being the winner of the 2008 edition.

Year	Result	Matches	Wins	Draws	Losses	GF	GA
Two-legged final 1998	did not qualify						
(Sweden) 1999	did not qualify						
(France) 2000	did not qualify						
(Norway) 2001	did not qualify						
(Sweden) 2002	did not qualify						
(Germany) 2003	Group-stage	3	1	1	1	6	6
(Finland) 2004	Semi-finals	4	1	1	2	7	5
(Hungary) 2005	did not qualify						
(Switzerland) 2006	did not qualify						
(Iceland) 2007	did not qualify						
(France) 2008	Champions	5	4	0	1	9	4
(Belarus) 2009	did not qualify						
(North Macedonia) 2010	Group-stage	3	0	1	2	5	9
(Italy) 2011	Semi-finals	4	3	0	1	8	5
(Turkey) 2012	did not qualify						
(Wales) 2013	did not qualify						
(Norway) 2014	did not qualify						
(Israel) 2015	did not qualify						
(Slovakia) 2016	did not qualify						
(Northern Ireland) 2017	Group-stage	3	0	1	2	5	11
(Switzerland) 2018	Group-stage	3	0	0	3	1	6
(Scotland) 2019	did not qualify						
(Georgia (country)) ~~2020~~	Cancelled due to the COVID-19 pandemic						
(Belarus) ~~2021~~	Cancelled due to the COVID-19 pandemic						
(Czech Republic) 2022	Group-stage	3	1	1	1	7	5
(Belgium) 2023	did not qualify						
(Lithuania) 2024	did not qualify						
(Poland) 2025	Semi-finals	4	1	1	3	3	5
(Bosnia and Herzegovina) 2026	Did not qualify						
(Hungary) 2027	TBD						
Total	11/26	32	11	6	15	51	50

== Head-to-head record ==
The following table shows Italy's head-to-head record in the FIFA U-20 Women's World Cup.

Opponent	Pld	W	D	L	GF	GA	GD	Win %
Brazil	2	0	1	1	2	3	−1	0.00
China	2	0	1	1	2	3	−1	0.00
Colombia	1	0	1	0	1	1	+0	0.00
Japan	1	0	1	0	1	1	+0	0.00
New Zealand	1	1	0	0	3	0	+3	100.00
Nigeria	2	0	1	1	1	5	−4	0.00
South Korea	2	1	0	1	3	3	+0	50.00
Spain	1	0	0	1	0	2	−2	0.00
United States	1	1	0	0	2	1	+1	100.00
Total	13	3	5	5	15	19	−4	23.08

== See also ==
- Italy women's national football team
- Italy women's national under-17 football team
- FIFA U-20 Women's World Cup
- UEFA Women's Under-19 Championship
