= 2024 UEFA Women's Under-19 Championship squads =

Player listing of women's football competition

This article describes about the squads for the 2024 UEFA Women's Under-19 Championship.

== Group A ==
=== England ===
The final squad was announced on 8 July 2024.

Head coach: (England) John Griffiths

No.	Pos.	Player	Date of birth (age)	Club
1	GK	Katie Cox	28 April 2006 (aged 18)	(The Football Association) Chelsea
13	GK	Hannah Poulter	26 April 2005 (aged 19)	Unattached
2	DF	Evie Rabjohn	28 April 2005 (aged 19)	(The Football Association) Manchester United
3	DF	Cerys Brown	22 June 2005 (aged 19)	(The Football Association) Chelsea
5	DF	Lucy Newell	2 October 2006 (aged 17)	(The Football Association) Manchester United
6	DF	Brooke Aspin	1 July 2005 (aged 19)	(The Football Association) Chelsea
17	DF	Ria Bose	7 February 2006 (aged 18)	Unattached
18	DF	Katie Reid	25 September 2006 (aged 17)	(The Football Association) Arsenal
20	DF	Araya Dennis	11 January 2006 (aged 18)	(The Football Association) Tottenham Hotspur
4	MF	Ashanti Akpan	24 November 2005 (aged 18)	(The Football Association) Chelsea
8	MF	Lexi Potter	17 August 2006 (aged 17)	(The Football Association) Chelsea
10	MF	Maddy Earl	3 November 2006 (aged 17)	(The Football Association) Arsenal
12	MF	Louanne Worsey	18 May 2005 (aged 19)	(The Football Association) Birmingham City
15	MF	Vivienne Lia	27 September 2006 (aged 17)	(The Football Association) Arsenal
7	FW	Mia Enderby	31 May 2005 (aged 19)	(The Football Association) Liverpool
9	FW	Michelle Agyemang	3 February 2006 (aged 18)	(The Football Association) Arsenal
11	FW	Freya Godfrey	7 May 2005 (aged 19)	(The Football Association) Arsenal
14	FW	Poppy Pritchard	3 December 2005 (aged 18)	(The Football Association) Manchester City
16	FW	Katy Watson	20 October 2005 (aged 18)	(The Football Association) Sunderland
19	FW	Georgia Mullett	16 September 2005 (aged 18)	(The Football Association) Aston Villa

=== France ===
The final squad was announced on 2 July 2024.

Head coach: (France) Philippe Joly

No.	Pos.	Player	Date of birth (age)	Club
1	GK	Féerine Belhadj	14 February 2005 (aged 19)	(French Football Federation) Olympique Lyonnais
16	GK	Alyssa Fernandes	1 January 2006 (aged 18)	(French Football Federation) PSG
2	DF	Céleste Delcroix	30 April 2006 (aged 18)	(French Football Federation) Lille
3	DF	Taëryne Job	10 July 2006 (aged 18)	(French Football Federation) Saint-Étienne
4	DF	Wassa Sangaré	16 March 2006 (aged 18)	(French Football Federation) Olympique Lyonnais
5	DF	Célia Delaby	20 December 2006 (aged 17)	(French Football Federation) Lille
6	DF	Lou Autin	25 January 2006 (aged 18)	(French Football Federation) Bordeaux
7	MF	Clara Bertrand	1 June 2006 (aged 18)	(French Football Federation) Orléans Loiret
8	MF	Nermyne Ben Khaled	14 May 2006 (aged 18)	(French Football Federation) Paris
14	MF	Charline Coutel	12 June 2006 (aged 18)	(French Football Federation) Olympique Lyonnais
15	MF	Landryna Lushimba Bilombi	14 March 2006 (aged 18)	(French Football Federation) PSG
17	MF	Fanny Rossi	8 November 2005 (aged 18)	(French Football Federation) PSG
18	MF	Julie Swierot	14 March 2006 (aged 18)	(French Football Federation) Olympique Lyonnais
9	FW	Camille Robillard	25 February 2005 (aged 19)	(French Football Federation) Nantes
10	FW	Lucie Calba	24 February 2005 (aged 19)	(French Football Federation) Metz
11	FW	Naolia Traoré	22 January 2006 (aged 18)	(French Football Federation) PSG
12	FW	Kadidia Traoré	13 May 2006 (aged 18)	(French Football Federation) Paris
13	FW	Almudena Sierra	27 April 2007 (aged 17)	(German Football Association) Hamburger
19	FW	Élisa Rambaud	24 July 2006 (aged 17)	(French Football Federation) Montpellier
20	FW	Lola Gstalter	13 July 2005 (aged 19)	(French Football Federation) Montpellier

=== Lithuania ===
The final squad was announced on 11 July 2024.

Head coach: (Belgium) Céderique Tulleners

No.	Pos.	Player	Date of birth (age)	Club
1	GK	Erneta Rinkevičiūtė	20 September 2006 (aged 17)	(Lithuanian Football Federation) MFA Žalgiris
22	GK	Darija Mikuckytė	16 April 2005 (aged 19)	(Lithuanian Football Federation) MFA Žalgiris
2	DF	Vanesa Vasiliauskaitė	31 August 2005 (aged 18)	(Lithuanian Football Federation) Hegelmann
3	DF	Karolina Jasaitytė	29 September 2005 (aged 18)	(Lithuanian Football Federation) TransINVEST
6	DF	Aivė Andriuškevičiūtė	10 February 2007 (aged 17)	(Lithuanian Football Federation) MFA Žalgiris
9	DF	Saulė Uždavinytė	9 October 2005 (aged 18)	(Lithuanian Football Federation) TransINVEST
12	DF	Ineta Šukštulytė	26 August 2005 (aged 18)	(Lithuanian Football Federation) MFA Žalgiris
13	DF	Kotryna Maželytė	27 March 2006 (aged 18)	(Lithuanian Football Federation) MFA Žalgiris
16	DF	Santa Lichareva	25 September 2005 (aged 18)	(Lithuanian Football Federation) MFA Žalgiris
4	MF	Rusnė Šešplaukytė	3 December 2005 (aged 18)	(Lithuanian Football Federation) MFA Žalgiris
8	MF	Gabrielė Skurdenytė	21 May 2006 (aged 18)	(Norwegian Football Federation) Herd
10	MF	Karina Klevinskaitė	27 July 2006 (aged 17)	(Lithuanian Football Federation) Kauno Žalgiris
11	MF	Atėnė Streckytė	11 April 2006 (aged 18)	(Lithuanian Football Federation) Banga Gargždai
14	MF	Žemyna Lekavičiūtė	16 August 2006 (aged 17)	(Lithuanian Football Federation) MFA Žalgiris
23	MF	Austėja Petkevičiūtė	20 June 2006 (aged 18)	(Lithuanian Football Federation) MFA Žalgiris
7	FW	Meida Proscevičiūtė	29 October 2005 (aged 18)	(Lithuanian Football Federation) Gintra
18	FW	Ema Kriaučiūnaitė	23 October 2005 (aged 18)	(Lithuanian Football Federation) Hegelmann
19	FW	Viltė Švarcaitė	21 February 2005 (aged 19)	(Lithuanian Football Federation) Banga Gargždai
20	FW	Patricja Penkauskaitė	5 May 2007 (aged 17)	(Lithuanian Football Federation) MFA Žalgiris
21	FW	Agnieška Kazarina	21 June 2006 (aged 18)	(Lithuanian Football Federation) Gintra

=== Serbia ===
The final squad was announced on 8 July 2024.

Head coach: (Serbia) Lidija Stojkanović

No.	Pos.	Player	Date of birth (age)	Club
1	GK	Ema Aleksić	10 October 2005 (aged 18)	(Football Association of Bosnia and Herzegovina) Sarajevo
12	GK	Jovana Đukić	26 January 2005 (aged 19)	(Football Association of Serbia) Vojvodina
2	DF	Milica Gaković	19 September 2005 (aged 18)	(Football Association of Serbia) Spartak Subotica
3	DF	Milica Šarić	13 August 2005 (aged 18)	(Football Association of Serbia) Spartak Subotica
4	DF	Anja Medić	10 October 2005 (aged 18)	(Football Association of Serbia) Sloga Zemun
5	DF	Mina Matijević	24 March 2006 (aged 18)	(German Football Association) Eintracht Frankfurt
6	DF	Milica Stojić	15 March 2005 (aged 19)	(Football Association of Serbia) Sloga Zemun
11	DF	Aleksandra Gajić	31 August 2006 (aged 17)	(Football Association of Serbia) Spartak Subotica
20	DF	Anđela Milovanović	14 June 2006 (aged 18)	(Football Association of Serbia) Crvena zvezda
8	MF	Lejla Sinanović	22 September 2006 (aged 17)	(German Football Association) Eintracht Frankfurt
10	MF	Aleksandra Ilić	14 September 2006 (aged 17)	(Football Association of Serbia) Crvena zvezda
14	MF	Milica Maljković	22 December 2006 (aged 17)	(Football Association of Serbia) Spartak Subotica
16	MF	Mina Čingelić	20 July 2006 (aged 17)	(Football Association of Serbia) Radnički
18	MF	Irena Majstorović	26 July 2005 (aged 18)	(Football Association of Serbia) Vojvodina
21	MF	Nađa Uvalin	4 February 2006 (aged 18)	(Football Association of Serbia) Spartak Subotica
7	FW	Sara Stokić	31 May 2005 (aged 19)	(Italian Football Federation) Milan
9	FW	Nina Matejić	8 February 2005 (aged 19)	(Football Association of Serbia) Crvena zvezda
15	FW	Sara Trbulin	24 November 2005 (aged 18)	(Football Association of Serbia) Vojvodina
17	FW	Monja Jošić	9 December 2005 (aged 18)	(Football Association of Serbia) Spartak Subotica
19	FW	Milica Babić	5 June 2005 (aged 19)	(Football Association of Serbia) Sturebi

== Group B ==
=== Germany ===
The final squad was announced on 4 July 2024.

Head coach: (Germany) Michael Urbansky

No.	Pos.	Player	Date of birth (age)	Club
1	GK	Anne Moll	6 April 2005 (aged 19)	(German Football Association) Bayer Leverkusen
12	GK	Thea Farwick	9 June 2006 (aged 18)	(German Football Association) SV Meppen
4	DF	Karla Brinkmann	31 October 2006 (aged 17)	(German Football Association) VfL Wolfsburg
5	DF	Emily Wallrabenstein	9 September 2006 (aged 17)	(German Football Association) Eintracht Frankfurt
7	DF	Nadine Bitzer	30 May 2006 (aged 18)	(German Football Association) TSG Hoffenheim
13	DF	Carlotta Schwoerer	24 March 2005 (aged 19)	(German Football Association) Bayern Munich
18	DF	Leni Wileschek	13 September 2006 (aged 17)	(German Football Association) TSG Hoffenheim
2	MF	Tessa Blumenberg	19 January 2005 (aged 19)	(German Football Association) VfL Wolfsburg
3	MF	Julia Mickenhagen	10 April 2005 (aged 19)	(German Football Association) Bayer Leverkusen
6	MF	Svea Stoldt	3 December 2005 (aged 18)	(German Football Association) Hamburger SV
14	MF	Melina Krüger	5 January 2006 (aged 18)	(German Football Association) Hamburger SV
15	MF	Lilith Schmidt	8 June 2006 (aged 18)	(German Football Association) 1. FC Köln
16	MF	Milena Röder	2 July 2006 (aged 18)	(German Football Association) TSG Hoffenheim
17	MF	Merle Hokamp	30 January 2007 (aged 17)	(German Football Association) FSV Gütersloh
8	FW	Paulina Bartz	9 May 2005 (aged 19)	(German Football Association) Bayer Leverkusen
9	FW	Melina Reuter	20 December 2005 (aged 18)	(German Football Association) Carl Zeiss Jena
10	FW	Estrella Merino Gonzalez	19 November 2006 (aged 17)	(German Football Association) Bayer Leverkusen
11	FW	Delice Boboy	30 October 2006 (aged 17)	(German Football Association) Bayer Leverkusen
19	FW	Leonie Schetter	18 July 2006 (aged 17)	(German Football Association) TSG Hoffenheim
20	FW	Laila Portella	7 May 2007 (aged 17)	(German Football Association) Bayern Munich

=== Netherlands ===
The final squad was announced on 3 July 2024.

Head coach: (Netherlands) Sherida van Bruggen

No.	Pos.	Player	Date of birth (age)	Club
1	GK	Danae van der Vliet	6 February 2007 (aged 17)	(Royal Dutch Football Association) Ajax
16	GK	Noa Tissingh	11 May 2007 (aged 17)	(Royal Dutch Football Association) Zwolle
2	DF	Daliyah de Klonia	18 March 2005 (aged 19)	(Royal Dutch Football Association) Ajax
3	DF	Karlijn Woons	13 July 2005 (aged 19)	(Royal Dutch Football Association) AZ
4	DF	Isa Kardinaal	31 March 2005 (aged 19)	(Royal Dutch Football Association) Ajax
5	DF	Anissa Chibani	11 April 2006 (aged 18)	(Royal Dutch Football Association) PSV
12	DF	Kyra Koopman	29 March 2007 (aged 17)	(Royal Dutch Football Association) Utrecht
13	DF	Maud Rutgers	24 August 2005 (aged 18)	(Royal Dutch Football Association) Zwolle
15	DF	Liv Rademaker	21 April 2006 (aged 18)	(Royal Dutch Football Association) Ajax
6	MF	Jasmijn van Uden	22 January 2006 (aged 18)	(Royal Dutch Football Association) AZ
8	MF	Sophie Proost	11 March 2007 (aged 17)	(Royal Dutch Football Association) Ajax
10	MF	Jade van Hensbergen	18 April 2006 (aged 18)	(Royal Dutch Football Association) Ajax
14	MF	Suus van der Weide	7 January 2006 (aged 18)	(Royal Dutch Football Association) Ajax
20	MF	Senne van de Velde	24 June 2005 (aged 19)	(Royal Dutch Football Association) Zwolle
7	FW	Lotte Keukelaar	25 September 2005 (aged 18)	(Royal Dutch Football Association) Ajax
9	FW	Danique Tolhoek	17 March 2005 (aged 19)	(Royal Dutch Football Association) Ajax
11	FW	Mirte van Koppen	13 April 2006 (aged 18)	(Royal Dutch Football Association) Ajax
17	FW	Lyanne Iedema	23 December 2006 (aged 17)	(Royal Dutch Football Association) Heerenveen
18	FW	Rose Ivens	21 December 2007 (aged 16)	(Royal Dutch Football Association) Twente
19	FW	Hanna Huizenga	4 July 2005 (aged 19)	(Royal Dutch Football Association) Zwolle

=== Republic of Ireland ===
The final squad was announced on 1 July 2024.

Head coach: (Republic of Ireland) Dave Connell

No.	Pos.	Player	Date of birth (age)	Club
1	GK	Katie Keane	27 July 2006 (aged 17)	(Football Association of Ireland) Athlone Town
16	GK	Jayne Merren	4 January 2005 (aged 19)	(Football Association of Ireland) Wexford
2	DF	Méabh Russell	24 March 2005 (aged 19)	(Football Association of Ireland) Wexford
4	DF	Kate Thompson	6 June 2005 (aged 19)	(Football Association of Ireland) Galway United
5	DF	Eve Dossen	11 June 2005 (aged 19)	(Football Association of Ireland) Galway United
6	DF	Aoife Kelly	1 March 2006 (aged 18)	(Football Association of Ireland) Shamrock Rovers
13	DF	Mary Phillips	20 May 2006 (aged 18)	(Football Association of Ireland) Athlone Town
15	DF	Aoife Turner	25 February 2006 (aged 18)	(United States Soccer Federation) MVLA Soccer
3	MF	Jodie Loughrey	15 September 2006 (aged 17)	(Football Association of Ireland) Sligo Rovers
8	MF	Jess Fitzgerald	12 July 2006 (aged 18)	(Football Association of Ireland) Peamount United
10	MF	Sophie Morrin	20 July 2005 (aged 18)	(United States Soccer Federation) UTSA
12	MF	Hannah Healy	18 December 2007 (aged 16)	(Football Association of Ireland) Shelbourne
14	MF	Freya Healy	5 November 2007 (aged 16)	(Football Association of Ireland) Peamount United
19	MF	Keri Loughrey	27 February 2005 (aged 19)	(Football Association of Ireland) Sligo Rovers
7	FW	Ellen Dolan	7 June 2006 (aged 18)	(Football Association of Ireland) Peamount United
9	FW	Joy Ralph	23 February 2006 (aged 18)	(Football Association of Ireland) Shamrock Rovers
11	FW	Lia O'Leary	26 March 2006 (aged 18)	(Football Association of Ireland) Shamrock Rovers
17	FW	Ceola Bergin	16 October 2006 (aged 17)	(Football Association of Ireland) Wexford
18	FW	Rola Olusola	22 May 2005 (aged 19)	(Football Association of Ireland) Galway United
20	FW	Hazel Donegan	22 May 2007 (aged 17)	(Football Association of Ireland) Athlone Town

=== Spain ===
The final squad was announced on 6 July 2024.

Head coach: (Spain) Sonia Bermúdez

No.	Pos.	Player	Date of birth (age)	Club
1	GK	Eunate Astralaga	30 November 2005 (aged 18)	(Royal Spanish Football Federation) Athletic Club
13	GK	Andrea Alonso	6 March 2006 (aged 18)	(Royal Spanish Football Federation) Real Madrid
2	DF	Judit Pujols	25 February 2005 (aged 19)	(Royal Spanish Football Federation) Barcelona
3	DF	Adriana Ranera	7 July 2005 (aged 19)	(Royal Spanish Football Federation) Barcelona
6	DF	Marina Artero	14 October 2005 (aged 18)	(Royal Spanish Football Federation) Athletic Club
7	DF	Noemí Bejarano	27 June 2006 (aged 18)	(Royal Spanish Football Federation) Real Madrid
12	DF	Aïcha Camara	11 December 2006 (aged 17)	(Royal Spanish Football Federation) Barcelona
18	DF	Núria Escoms	15 August 2006 (aged 17)	(Royal Spanish Football Federation) Levante
8	MF	Ainhoa Alguacil	8 January 2006 (aged 18)	(Royal Spanish Football Federation) Valencia
10	MF	Cristina Librán	11 January 2006 (aged 18)	(Royal Spanish Football Federation) Madrid
14	MF	Daniela Arques	21 March 2006 (aged 18)	(Royal Spanish Football Federation) Levante
15	MF	Intza Eguiguren	29 December 2005 (aged 18)	(Royal Spanish Football Federation) Real Sociedad
16	MF	Paula Rubio	28 August 2005 (aged 18)	(Royal Spanish Football Federation) Real Madrid
17	MF	Oihane San Martín	13 May 2005 (aged 19)	(Royal Spanish Football Federation) Athletic Club
9	FW	María García	22 June 2006 (aged 18)	(Royal Spanish Football Federation) Real Madrid
11	FW	Daniela Agote	27 August 2006 (aged 17)	(Royal Spanish Football Federation) Athletic Club
19	FW	Bárbara López	30 August 2005 (aged 18)	(Royal Spanish Football Federation) Sporting de Huelva
20	FW	Olga San Nicolás	23 March 2005 (aged 19)	(Royal Spanish Football Federation) Deportivo Alavés
21	FW	Paula Comendador	12 January 2007 (aged 17)	(Royal Spanish Football Federation) Real Madrid
22	FW	Raquel Gil	14 June 2005 (aged 19)	(Royal Spanish Football Federation) Valencia
