= 2023 Sud Ladies Cup squads =

List of squads of the 2023 Sud Ladies Cup

The 2023 Sud Ladies Cup was an international association football tournament held in Vaucluse, France. The four national teams involved in the tournament were required to register a squad of 24 players; only players in these squads were eligible to take part in the tournament.

The age listed for each player is on 16 June 2023, the first day of the tournament. The club listed is the club for which the player last played a competitive match prior to the tournament. The nationality for each club reflects the national association (not the league) to which the club is affiliated. A flag is included for coaches that are of a different nationality than their own national team.

== Cameroon ==
Cameroon announced the 20-player squad on 13 May 2023.

Head coach: Josephine Ndoumou Mike

== France ==
France announced the 22-player squad on 9 May 2023.

Head coach: Sandrine Ringler

No.	Pos.	Player	Date of birth (age)	Club
	GK	Inès Marques	25 March 2004 (age 20)	(France) Paris FC
	GK	Emma Francart	31 January 2004 (age 21)	(France) Metz
	DF	Marion Haelewyn	30 October 2004 (age 20)	(France) Bordeaux
	DF	Léa Notel	3 October 2004 (age 20)	(France) Reims
	DF	Jade Rastocle	12 July 2004 (age 20)	(France) Reims
	DF	Éloïse Sévenne	22 January 2003 (age 22)	(France) Rodez
	DF	Margaux Vairon	24 April 2003 (age 21)	(France) Dijon
	DF	Maïwen Renard	4 April 2003 (age 21)	(France) Guingamp
	MF	Chloé Neller (captain)	13 May 2004 (age 20)	(France) Paris FC
	MF	Inès Kbida	10 May 2003 (age 21)	(France) Marseille
	MF	Adja Binate Soumahoro	7 May 2003 (age 21)	(France) Paris FC
	MF	Faustine Bataillard	3 August 2004 (age 20)	(France) Saint-Étienne
	MF	Judith Coquet	5 August 2003 (age 21)	(France) Montpellier
	MF	Inès Benyahia	26 March 2003 (age 21)	(France) Lyon
	FW	Madeleine Yetna	9 April 2004 (age 20)	(France) Dijon
	FW	Louna Ribadeira	18 August 2004 (age 20)	(France) Paris FC
	FW	Airine Fontaine	20 August 2004 (age 20)	(France) Paris FC
	FW	Nesrine Bahlouli	20 February 2003 (age 22)	(France) Lyon
	FW	Pauline Haugou	29 September 2004 (age 20)	(France) Strasbourg
	FW	Noémie Mouchon	6 June 2003 (age 21)	(France) Lille

== Japan ==
Japan announced the 23-player squad on 1 May 2023. On 3 May, Seina Ikegami withdrew due to injury and was replaced by Yuka Kurimoto. On 8 May, Maho Konno withdrew due to injury.

Head coach: Michihisa Kano

No.	Pos.	Player	Date of birth (age)	Club
1	GK	Akane Okuma	15 September 2004 (age 20)	(Japan) JEF United Chiba
18	GK	Uruha Iwasaki	13 March 2006 (age 19)	(Japan) Nojima Stella Sagamihara Due
21	GK	Akari Kashima	7 July 2005 (age 19)	(Japan) JFA Academy Fukushima
2	DF	Nana Kashimura	15 April 2004 (age 20)	(Japan) Tokyo Verdy Beleza
3	DF	Hiromi Yoneda	2 October 2004 (age 20)	(Japan) Cerezo Osaka Yanmar
6	DF	Yurie Shirasawa	9 April 2004 (age 20)	(Japan) Albirex Niigata
16	DF	Rina Nakatani	27 April 2005 (age 19)	(Japan) Cerezo Osaka Yanmar
17	DF	Toko Koga	6 January 2006 (age 19)	(Japan) JFA Academy Fukushima
22	DF	Uno Shiragaki	11 October 2005 (age 19)	(Japan) Cerezo Osaka Yanmar
23	DF	Rui Yoshida	6 February 2006 (age 19)	(Japan) Cerezo Osaka Yanmar
5	MF	Manaka Hayashi (captain)	16 August 2004 (age 20)	(Japan) MVLA SC
7	MF	Kotono Sakakibara	11 October 2004 (age 20)	(Japan) Nagano Parceiro
8	MF	Fuka Tsunoda	24 October 2004 (age 20)	(Japan) Urawa Red Diamonds
11	MF	Haruna Oshima	29 March 2005 (age 19)	(Japan) Omiya Ardija Ventus
12	MF	Chinari Sasai	12 October 2004 (age 20)	(Japan) Nojima Stella Sagamihara
13	MF	Yuko Inose	6 March 2004 (age 21)	(Japan) MyNavi Sendai
14	MF	Momoko Tanikawa	7 May 2005 (age 19)	(Japan) JFA Academy Fukushima
24	MF	Moka Hiwatari	9 October 2005 (age 19)	(Japan) Tokyo Verdy Beleza
	MF	Maho Konno	20 December 2005 (age 19)	(Japan) Urawa Red Diamonds
4	FW	Momoko Nebu	28 May 2004 (age 20)	(Japan) Yamato Sylphid
9	FW	Rihona Ujihara	8 July 2004 (age 20)	(Japan) Tokyo Verdy Beleza
15	FW	Yuka Kurimoto	9 November 2006 (age 18)	(Japan) Cerezo Osaka Yanmar
20	FW	Yuki Ogawa	4 November 2004 (age 20)	(Japan) JEF United Chiba

== Panama ==
Panama announced the 20-player squad on 11 May 2023.

Head coach: Raiza Gutiérrez

No.	Pos.	Player	Date of birth (age)	Club
1	GK	Alejandra Garay	30 June 2005 (aged 17)	(Panama) Chorrillo FC
12	GK	Maritza Valdés	29 January 2005 (aged 18)	(Panama) Sporting SM
2	DF	Amayah Singleton	3 June 2005 (aged 17)	(United States) Wake FC
3	DF	Josselyn Montenegro	9 August 2005 (aged 17)	(Panama) Deportivo Chiriquí F.C.
4	DF	Dayane Madrid	31 March 2005 (aged 17)	(Panama) Sporting SM
5	DF	Meredith Rosas	29 September 2005 (aged 17)	(Panama) Sporting SM
16	DF	Mireilis Rojas	19 September 2005 (aged 17)	(Panama) Chorrillo FC
6	MF	Deysiré Salazar (captain)	4 May 2004 (aged 18)	(Panama) Tauro F.C.
7	MF	Sherline King	25 September 2005 (aged 17)	(Panama) Tauro F.C.
8	MF	Diana Pon		(United States) Penn State University
10	MF	Reggina Espino	2 July 2005 (aged 17)	(Panama) Sporting SM
11	MF	Aaliyah Gil	1 January 2005 (aged 18)	(Panama) Tauro F.C.
13	MF	Nicole Cargill	2 July 2005 (aged 17)	(United States) Forest Park Bruins
14	MF	Delineth Rivera	29 July 2005 (aged 17)	(Panama) Sporting SM
15	MF	Marissa Gross	1 January 2005 (aged 18)	(United States) Dallas Texans
17	MF	Amanda Goldstein		(United States) FC Stars
19	MF	Aida Name	1 January 2005 (aged 18)	(Panama) FC Stars
20	MF	Sara Nieto	22 November 2003 (aged 19)	(Panama) Sporting SM
9	FW	Daniela Hincapié	5 December 2005 (aged 17)	(Panama) CA Independiente
18	MF	Analía Arosemena		(Panama) Tauro F.C.

== See also ==
- 2023 Maurice Revello Tournament squads
