= Republic of Ireland women's national under-19 football team =

National association football team

Ireland Women's U-19
- Association: Football Association of Ireland
- Confederation: UEFA (Europe)
- Head coach: Chelsea Noonan
- FIFA code: IRL
First colours	Second colours

UEFA Women's Under-19 Championship
- Appearances: 2 (first in 2014)
- Best result: Semi-final, 2014

FIFA U-20 Women's World Cup
- Appearances: 0

The Republic of Ireland women's national under-19 football team represents Ireland at the UEFA Women's Under-19 Championship and the FIFA U-20 Women's World Cup.

== History ==
=== UEFA Women's Under-19 Championship ===
The Irish team has qualified for the UEFA Women's Under-19 Championship finals once, reaching the semi-finals in 2014. They lost 4–0 to the Netherlands, for whom Vivianne Miedema scored a hat-trick.

Year	Round	Pld	W	D	L	GF	GA	Squad
Two-legged final 1998	did not qualify							
(Sweden) 1999	did not qualify							
(France) 2000	did not qualify							
(Norway) 2001	did not qualify							
(Sweden) 2002	did not qualify							
(Germany) 2003	did not qualify							
(Finland) 2004	did not qualify							
(Hungary) 2005	did not qualify							
(Switzerland) 2006	did not qualify							
(Iceland) 2007	did not qualify							
(France) 2008	did not qualify							
(Belarus) 2009	did not qualify							
(North Macedonia) 2010	did not qualify							
(Italy) 2011	did not qualify							
(Turkey) 2012	did not qualify							
(Wales) 2013	did not qualify							
(Norway) 2014	Semi-finals	4	3	0	1	5	6	Squad
2015	did not qualify							
(Slovakia) 2016	did not qualify							
(Northern Ireland) 2017	did not qualify							
(Switzerland) 2018	did not qualify							
(Scotland) 2019	did not qualify							
(Georgia (country)) ~~2020~~	Cancelled due to the COVID-19 pandemic							
(Belarus) ~~2021~~	Cancelled due to the COVID-19 pandemic							
(Czech Republic) 2022	did not qualify							
(Belgium) 2023	did not qualify							
(Lithuania) 2024	Group stage	3	0	1	2	1	4	Squad
(Poland) 2025	did not qualify							
(Bosnia and Herzegovina) 2026	did not qualify							
(Hungary) 2027	TBD							
Total	2/26	7	3	1	3	6	10	

== Results and fixtures ==
The following is a list of match results in the last 12 months, as well as any future matches that have been scheduled.

Legend

Win Draw Lose Fixture

=== 2025 ===
26 November 2026 UEFA European Under-19 Championship qualification	Republic of Ireland	1–3	Sweden	Albena, Bulgaria
09:00 GMT (11:00 local time)	Lawlee 73'	Report	Lundin 4', 64'; J. Wrede 71'	Stadium: Albena 1 Referee: Olivia Tschon (Austria)

29 November 2026 UEFA European Under-19 Championship qualification	Poland	3–0	Republic of Ireland	Albena, Bulgaria
12:15 GMT (14:15 local time)	Araśniewicz 10'; Langosz 37'; Witek 43'	Report		Stadium: Albena 1 Referee: Lotta Vuorio (Finland)

2 December 2026 UEFA European Under-19 Championship qualification	Bulgaria	1–4	Republic of Ireland	Albena, Bulgaria
11:00 GMT (13:00 local time)	Boneva 45+2'	Report	Butler 16', 41'; Wollmer 25'; Healy 34'	Stadium: Albena 1 Referee: Anastasia Mylopoulou (Greece)

=== 2026 ===
10 April 2026 UEFA European Under-19 Championship qualification	Republic of Ireland	0–3	Germany	Essen, Germany
14:30 GMT (15:30 local time)		Report	L. Wrede 22'; Bäcker 62'; J. Wrede 71'	Stadium: Uhlenkrugstadion; Referee: Deborah Bianchi (Italy)

13 April 2026 UEFA European Under-19 Championship qualification	France	2–2	Republic of Ireland	Essen, Germany
11:00 GMT (12:00 local time)	Gay 34'; Morissaint 75'	Report	Newell 54'; Cowper-Gray 62'	Stadium: Uhlenkrugstadion; Referee: Michaela Pachtová (Czech Republic)

16 April 2026 UEFA European Under-19 Championship qualification	Slovakia	2–1	Republic of Ireland	Velbert, Germany
16:00 GMT (17:00 local time)	Šoltysová 61', 84'	Report	Donegan 42'	Stadium: IMS Arena; Referee: Merima Čelik (Bosnia and Herzegovina)

7 October 2027 UEFA European Under-19 Championship qualification	Republic of Ireland	11–0	Armenia	Albena
14:00	McGuane 3', 27'; Newell 18', 26'; Wollmer 20', 30'; Butler 38', 42', 50'; Finn 45'; Byrne 84'	Report		Referee: Farida Lutfaliyeva (Azerbaijan)

10 October 2027 UEFA European Under-19 Championship qualification	Republic of Ireland	7–0	Georgia	Albena
14:00	Butler 8', 34'; Jones 26'; Kelly 36'; Breslin 49', 89'; Devoy 82'	Report		Referee: Anna Adamska (Poland)

13 October 2027 UEFA European Under-19 Championship qualification	Bulgaria	0–2	Republic of Ireland	Albena
11:00		Report	McGuane 48'; Butler 68'	Referee: Anna Adamska (Poland)

== Current squad ==
The following players were named to the squad to take part in the 2027 UEFA European Under-19 Championship Qualifiers for the games against Bulgaria, Armenia & Georgia in October 2026.

Caps and goals correct as of 10 October 2026, after the match against Bulgaria.

No.	Pos.	Player	Date of birth (age)	Caps	Goals	Club
1	GK	Jenna Willoughby	20 August 2008 (age 18)	4	0	(Football Association of Ireland) Shelbourne
16	GK	Laura Fanning	31 August 2008 (age 18)	2	0	(Football Association of Ireland) Shamrock Rovers
2	DF	Holly O'Hagan	27 March 2009 (age 17)	3	0	(Football Association of Ireland) Cork City
3	DF	Amelia Fahey	10 March 2009 (age 17)	2	0	(The Football Association) Chelsea
4	DF	Kate Jones	26 September 2008 (age 18)	6	1	(Football Association of Ireland) Treaty United
11	DF	Ella Kelly	18 October 2008 (age 18)	13	1	(Football Association of Ireland) Shamrock Rovers
12	DF	Finley Newell	3 May 2008 (age 18)	12	3	(United States Soccer Federation) Georgetown Hoyas
15	DF	Emma Mooney	20 September 2009 (age 17)	4	0	(Football Association of Ireland) Athlone Town
18	DF	Aibhlinn Cotter	11 May 2008 (age 18)	5	0	(Football Association of Ireland) Treaty United
5	MF	Aoife Colbert Martin	21 December 2008 (age 17)	3	0	(The Football Association) Manchester City
6	MF	Tess Finn	10 April 2009 (age 17)	3	1	(The Football Association) Chelsea
7	MF	Sophie Byrne	26 May 2009 (age 17)	3	1	(Football Association of Ireland) Peamount United
8	MF	Madison McGuane	10 August 2009 (age 17)	10	3	(Football Association of Ireland) Treaty United
13	MF	Lauren Bowe	6 February 2008 (age 18)	9	0	(The Football Association) West Ham
14	MF	Beatrice Silickatie	18 January 2008 (age 18)	2	0	(Football Association of Ireland) Shamrock Rovers
17	MF	Alex Devoy	11 February 2009 (age 17)	3	1	(Football Association of Ireland) Bohemians
9	FW	Maeve Wollmer	26 February 2008 (age 18)	9	3	(Football Association of Ireland) Shelbourne
10	FW	Anna Butler	30 August 2008 (age 18)	9	8	(Football Association of Ireland) Shamrock Rovers
19	FW	Ciara Breslin	3 July 2008 (age 18)	2	2	(Football Association of Ireland) Treaty United
20	FW	Leah McGrath	7 December 2008 (age 17)	3	1	(Football Association of Ireland) Wexford

=== Coaches ===
- Susan Ronan (2000–2010)
- Dave Connell (2017–2026)
- Chelsea Noonan (2026–)

== See also ==
- Republic of Ireland women's national football team
- Republic of Ireland women's national under-17 football team
- FIFA U-20 Women's World Cup
- UEFA Women's Under-19 Championship
