= France women's national under-19 football team =

Selected team of French football players under 19 years

France
- Nickname: Les Bleuettes (The Little Blues)
- Association: France Football Federation
- Confederation: UEFA (Europe)
- Head coach: Philippe Joly (U19); Sandrine Ringler (U20)
- Captain: Louna Ribadeira (U19); Laurina Fazer (U20)
- FIFA code: FRA
First colours	Second colours

UEFA Women's Under-19 Championship
- Appearances: 19 (first in 1998)
- Best result: Champions (2003, 2010, 2013, 2016, 2019)

FIFA U-20 Women's World Cup
- Appearances: 10 (first in 2002)
- Best result: Runners-up (2016)

The France women's national under-19 football team represents France at UEFA Women's Under-19 Championship and FIFA U-20 Women's World Cup. Their first achievement was winning the 2003 UEFA Women's Under-19 Championship. They have then won four more UEFA Women's U-19 European Championships in 2010, 2013, 2016 and 2019. France hosted the FIFA U-20 Women's World Cup in 2018.

== Fixtures and results ==
Legend

Win Draw Lose Fixture

=== 2026 ===
10 April 2026 2026 UEFA Women's Under-19 Championship qualification Round 2	France	2–1	Slovakia	IMS Arena, Velbert
12:00	Rouquet 16'; Gay 61' (pen.)	Report	Havalec 74'	Referee: Merima Čelik (Bosnia and Herzegovina)

13 April 2026 2026 UEFA Women's Under-19 Championship qualification Round 2	France	2–2	Republic of Ireland	Uhlenkrugstadion, Essen
12:00	Gay 34'; Morissaint 75'	Report	Newell 54'; Cowper-Grey 62'	Referee: Michaela Pachtová (Czechia)

16 April 2026 2026 UEFA Women's Under-19 Championship qualification Round 2	Germany	2–1	France	Uhlenkrugstadion, Essen
17:00	Rückert 3'; Börner 79'	Report	Morissaint 66'	Referee: Michaela Pachtová (Czechia)

=== 2025 ===
2 April 2025 2025 UEFA Women's Under-19 Championship qualification Round 2	France	1–0	Wales	Stebonheath Park, Llanelli
17:00	Rouquet 37'	Report		Referee: Anastasia Mylopoulou (Greece)

5 April 2025 2025 UEFA Women's Under-19 Championship qualification Round 2	France	4–3	Serbia	Old Road Training Ground, Briton Ferry
17:00	Mé. Mendy 32'; Ma. Mendy 76'; Swierot 85'; Effa 89'	Report	Nikolić 12'; Čingelić 35'; Ninković 71'	Attendance: 103; Referee: Rasa Grigonė (Lithuania)

8 April 2025 2025 UEFA Women's Under-19 Championship qualification Round 2	Republic of Ireland	1–2	France	Ynys Park Stadium, Port Talbot
15:00	Brennan 22'	Report	Mendy 82' (pen.); Rouquet 90+3'	Referee: Rasa Grigonė (Lithuania)

15 June 2025 2025 UEFA Women's Under-19 Championship GS	France	3–0	Sweden	Stadium Rzeszów, Rzeszów
19:00	Joseph 26'; Effa Effa 63'; Graziani 70'	Report		Attendance: 283; Referee: Rasa Grigonė (Lithuania)

18 June 2025 2025 UEFA Women's Under-19 Championship GS	Poland	0–6	France	Stadium Mielec, Mielec
18:00		Report	Joseph 8', 34', 52'; Swierot 40'; Graziani 74'; Ma. Mendy 90+2'	Attendance: 2,264; Referee: Merima Čelik (Bosnia & Herzegovina)

21 June 2025 2025 UEFA Women's Under-19 Championship GS	Italy	1–2	France	Stadium Rzeszów, Rzeszów
16:00	Sciabica 60'	Report	Lushimba Bilombi 33'; Dufour 74'	Attendance: 238; Referee: Emilie Torkelsen (Norway)

24 June 2025 2025 UEFA Women's Under-19 Championship SF	France	4−3 (a.e.t.)	Portugal	Stadium Stalowa Wola, Stalowa Wola
20:00	Graziani 7'; Ma. Mendy 13', 92'; Mé. Mendy 113' (pen.)	Report	Gago 30' (pen.); Martins 74'; Costa 105+2'	Attendance: 275; Referee: Rasa Grigonė (Lithuania)

27 June 2025 2025 UEFA Women's Under-19 Championship F	France	0–4	Spain	Stadium Rzeszów, Rzeszów
20:00		Report	Librán 23'; Agote 35'; Serrajordi 69'; Bejarano 87'	Attendance: 1,198; Referee: Fabienne Michel (Germany)

26 November 2025 2026 UEFA Women's Under-19 Championship qualification Round 1	France	1–0	Turkey	Cardiff International Sports Campus, Cardiff
15:00 (14:00 UTC+0)	Rouquet 8'	Report		Referee: Lovisa Johansson (Sweden)

29 November 2025 2026 UEFA Women's Under-19 Championship qualification Round 1	France	3–2	Finland	Cardiff International Sports Campus, Cardiff
19:00 (18:00 UTC+0)	Mäkelä 28' (o.g.); Graziani 47'; Sierra 84'	Report	Kumpulainen 45+1'; Ulenius 72'	Referee: Michaela Pachtova (Czechia)

2 December 2025 2026 UEFA Women's Under-19 Championship qualification Round 1	Wales	1–3	France	Dragon Park, Newport
15:00 (14:00 UTC+0)	Em. Cole 75'	Report	Rafalski 26'; Rouquet 54'; Ebayilin 67'	Referee: Michaela Pachtova (Czechia)

== Players ==
=== Current U19 squad ===
The following players were named in the squad for 2022 UEFA Women's Under-19 Championship.

Caps and goals are correct as of 6 July 2022, after the match against Norway.

No.	Pos.	Player	Date of birth (age)	Caps	Goals	Club
1	GK	Inès Marques	25 March 2004 (age 22)	10	0	(French Football Federation) Paris FC
16	GK	Emma Francart	31 January 2004 (age 22)	4	0	(French Football Federation) Metz
2	DF	Marion Haelewyn	30 October 2004 (age 22)	5	0	(French Football Federation) Bordeaux
3	DF	Léa Notel	3 October 2004 (age 22)	4	0	(French Football Federation) Reims
4	DF	Jade Rastocle	12 July 2004 (age 22)	8	0	(French Football Federation) Reims
5	DF	Éloïse Sévenne	22 January 2003 (age 23)	5	0	(French Football Federation) Rodez
13	DF	Margaux Vairon	24 April 2003 (age 23)	3	0	(French Football Federation) Dijon
14	DF	Maïwen Renard	4 April 2003 (age 23)	1	0	(French Football Federation) Guingamp
6	MF	Chloé Neller	13 May 2004 (age 22)	9	1	(French Football Federation) Paris FC
8	MF	Inès Kbida	10 May 2003 (age 23)	9	0	(French Football Federation) Marseille
10	MF	Adja Binate Soumahoro	7 May 2003 (age 23)	10	0	(French Football Federation) Paris FC
15	MF	Faustine Bataillard	3 August 2004 (age 22)	5	2	(French Football Federation) Saint-Étienne
17	MF	Judith Coquet	5 August 2003 (age 23)	5	2	(French Football Federation) Montpellier
19	MF	Inès Benyahia	26 March 2003 (age 23)	5	1	(French Football Federation) Lyon
7	FW	Madeleine Yetna	9 April 2004 (age 22)	10	1	(French Football Federation) Dijon
9	FW	Louna Ribadeira (captain)	18 August 2004 (age 22)	14	8	(French Football Federation) Paris FC
11	FW	Airine Fontaine	20 August 2004 (age 22)	13	1	(French Football Federation) Paris FC
12	FW	Nesrine Bahlouli	20 February 2003 (age 23)	7	1	(French Football Federation) Lyon
18	FW	Pauline Haugou	29 September 2004 (age 22)	6	3	(French Football Federation) Strasbourg
20	FW	Noémie Mouchon	6 June 2003 (age 23)	7	2	(French Football Federation) Lille

=== Current U20 squad ===
The following players were named in the squad for 2022 FIFA U-20 Women's World Cup.

Caps and goals are correct as of 17 August 2022, after the match against South Korea.

No.	Pos.	Player	Date of birth (age)	Caps	Goals	Club
1	GK	Marie-Morgane Sieber	15 July 2002 (age 24)	5	0	(French Football Federation) Rodez
16	GK	Marie Petiteau	12 June 2002 (age 24)	9	0	(French Football Federation) Saint-Malo
21	GK	Océane Toussaint	20 February 2004 (age 22)	1	0	(French Football Federation) Paris Saint-Germain
2	DF	Célina Ould Hocine	3 February 2002 (age 24)	8	1	(French Football Federation) Paris FC
3	DF	Lou Bogaert	25 June 2004 (age 22)	5	0	(French Football Federation) Paris FC
4	DF	Alice Sombath	16 October 2003 (age 23)	10	0	(French Football Federation) Lyon
5	DF	Kysha Sylla	4 February 2004 (age 22)	6	0	(French Football Federation) Lyon
14	DF	Annaëlle Tchakounté	25 August 2003 (age 23)	9	0	(French Football Federation) Paris FC
15	DF	Thiniba Samoura	11 February 2004 (age 22)	6	0	(French Football Federation) Paris FC
18	DF	Jade Le Guilly	18 June 2002 (age 24)	11	0	(Royal Spanish Football Federation) Real Sociedad
6	MF	Cyrielle Blanc	23 January 2003 (age 23)	7	0	(French Football Federation) Montpellier
8	MF	Laurina Fazer (captain)	13 October 2003 (age 23)	7	1	(French Football Federation) Paris Saint-Germain
10	MF	Magnaba Folquet	3 November 2003 (age 23)	6	2	(French Football Federation) Paris Saint-Germain
17	MF	Océane Hurtré	17 February 2004 (age 22)	7	0	(French Football Federation) Dijon
20	MF	Mégane Hoeltzel	21 April 2003 (age 23)	8	1	(French Football Federation) Strasbourg
7	FW	Esther Mbakem-Niaro	7 January 2002 (age 24)	14	5	(French Football Federation) Montpellier
9	FW	Hawa Sangaré	20 July 2002 (age 24)	5	0	(Italian Football Federation) Pomigliano
11	FW	Vicki Bècho	3 October 2003 (age 23)	11	3	(French Football Federation) Lyon
12	FW	Jade Nassi	26 April 2003 (age 23)	8	1	(French Football Federation) Nantes
13	FW	Yrma Mze Issa	26 October 2003 (age 23)	6	2	(French Football Federation) Marseille
19	FW	Manssita Traoré	9 September 2003 (age 23)	10	0	(French Football Federation) Paris Saint-Germain

== Competitive record ==
=== FIFA U-20 Women's World Cup ===
Year	Result	GP	W	D*	L	GF	GA
(Canada) 2002	Group stage	3	1	0	2	2	7
(Thailand) 2004	Did not qualify						
(Russia) 2006	Quarter-finals	4	2	0	2	7	3
(Chile) 2008	Fourth place	6	3	0	3	12	13
(Germany) 2010	Group stage	3	1	1	1	4	5
(Japan) 2012	Did not qualify						
(Canada) 2014	Third place	6	4	1	1	16	5
(Papua New Guinea) 2016	Runners-up	6	3	2	1	8	6
(France) 2018	Fourth place	6	3	2	1	10	3
(Costa Rica) 2022	Quarter-finals	4	2	1	1	7	5
(Colombia) 2024	Round of 16	4	1	1	2	15	8
(Poland) 2026	Round of 16	4	2	1	1	9	6
Total:10/12	Runners-up	46	22	9	15	90	61

=== UEFA Women's Under-19 Championship ===
The French team has participated in the UEFA Women's Under-19 Championship 18 times; Winning it five times (2003, 2010, 2013, 2016 and 2019)

Year	Result	Matches	Wins	Draws*	Losses	GF	GA
Two-legged final 1998	Runners-up	6	4	0	2	8	6
(Sweden) 1999	did not qualify						
(France) 2000	Fourth place	3	0	0	3	4	9
(Norway) 2001	did not qualify						
(Sweden) 2002	Runners-up	5	2	1	2	6	7
(Germany) 2003	Champions	5	3	1	1	10	6
(Finland) 2004	Group stage	3	1	1	1	4	5
(Hungary) 2005	Runners-up	5	3	2	0	11	4
(Switzerland) 2006	Runners-up	5	4	0	1	9	4
(Iceland) 2007	Semi-finals	4	2	0	2	8	7
(France) 2008	Group stage	3	1	1	1	3	4
(Belarus) 2009	Semi-finals	4	2	0	2	8	7
(North Macedonia) 2010	Champions	5	3	1	1	10	5
(Italy) 2011	did not qualify						
(Turkey) 2012	did not qualify						
(Wales) 2013	Champions	5	4	1	0	10	2
(Norway) 2014	did not qualify						
(Israel) 2015	Semi-finals	4	3	1	0	7	1
(Slovakia) 2016	Champions	5	4	0	1	13	4
(Northern Ireland) 2017	Runners-up	5	3	0	2	11	7
(Switzerland) 2018	Group stage	3	0	1	2	3	5
(Scotland) 2019	Champions	5	4	1	0	13	7
(Georgia (country)) ~~2020~~	Cancelled due to COVID-19 pandemic						
(Belarus) ~~2021~~	Cancelled due to COVID-19 pandemic						
(Czech Republic) 2022	Semi-finals	4	1	2	1	6	4
(Belgium) 2023	Semi-finals	4	3	0	1	8	4
(Lithuania) 2024	Semi-finals	4	2	0	2	9	4
(Poland) 2025	Runners-up	5	4	0	1	15	8
(Bosnia and Herzegovina) 2026	Did not qualify						
(Hungary) 2027	TBD						
Total	21/26	92	53	13	26	176	110

== Head-to-head record ==
The following table shows France's head-to-head record in the FIFA U-20 Women's World Cup.

Opponent	Pld	W	D	L	GF	GA	GD	Win %
Argentina	2	2	0	0	8	1	+7	100.00
Brazil	2	0	0	2	0	7	−7	0.00
Canada	2	1	1	0	6	4	+2	50.00
China	1	1	0	0	2	0	+2	100.00
Colombia	1	0	1	0	1	1	+0	0.00
Costa Rica	2	2	0	0	7	1	+6	100.00
DR Congo	1	1	0	0	1	0	+1	100.00
Ecuador	1	1	0	0	3	2	+1	100.00
England	1	0	1	0	1	1	+0	0.00
Fiji	1	1	0	0	11	0	+11	100.00
Germany	5	1	0	4	6	13	−7	20.00
Ghana	3	2	1	0	10	3	+7	66.67
Japan	2	1	1	0	5	4	+1	50.00
Mexico	1	1	0	0	2	1	+1	100.00
Netherlands	2	1	0	1	5	2	+3	50.00
New Zealand	3	2	1	0	6	0	+6	66.67
Nigeria	2	1	0	1	3	3	+0	50.00
North Korea	5	2	0	3	7	9	−2	40.00
Paraguay	1	1	0	0	3	0	+3	100.00
South Korea	3	1	2	0	2	1	+1	33.33
Spain	1	0	0	1	0	1	−1	0.00
United States	3	0	1	2	0	4	−4	0.00
Total	45	22	9	14	89	58	+31	48.89

== See also ==
- France women's national football team
- France women's national under-17 football team
