= 2014 UEFA Women's Under-19 Championship squads =

Player listing of women's football competition

This article displays the squads for the 2014 UEFA Women's Under-19 Championship in Norway.

== Group A ==
=== Norway ===
Head coach: Jarl Torske

No.	Pos.	Player	Date of birth (age)	Club
1	GK	Cecilie Fiskerstrand	20 March 1996 (aged 18)	(Norwegian Football Federation) Fortuna Ålesund
12	GK	Aurora Mikalsen	21 March 1996 (aged 18)	(Norwegian Football Federation) Arna-Bjørnar
2	DF	Cecilie Redisch Kvamme	11 September 1995 (aged 18)	(Norwegian Football Federation) Arna-Bjørnar
3	DF	Marit Clausen	25 June 1996 (aged 18)	(Norwegian Football Federation) Rosenborg BK
4	DF	Ane Sund Walsøe	3 February 1995 (aged 19)	(Norwegian Football Federation) Medkila
5	DF	Andrine Tomter	5 February 1995 (aged 19)	(Norwegian Football Federation) Kolbotn
13	DF	Tuva Hansen	4 August 1997 (aged 16)	(Norwegian Football Federation) Arna-Bjørnar
6	MF	Lisa Naalsund	11 June 1995 (aged 19)	(Norwegian Football Federation) Arna-Bjørnar
7	MF	Vilde Bøe Risa	13 July 1995 (aged 19)	(Norwegian Football Federation) Arna-Bjørnar
8	MF	Synne Skinnes Hansen	12 August 1995 (aged 18)	(Norwegian Football Federation) Røa
9	MF	Sigrid Heien Hansen	3 November 1995 (aged 18)	(Norwegian Football Federation) Arna-Bjørnar
16	MF	Sara Johansen	17 September 1995 (aged 18)	(Norwegian Football Federation) Fløya
18	MF	Johanne Fridlund	24 July 1996 (aged 17)	(Norwegian Football Federation) Vålerenga
10	FW	Synne Jensen	15 February 1996 (aged 18)	(Norwegian Football Federation) Kolbotn
11	FW	Marie Markussen	15 February 1997 (aged 17)	(Norwegian Football Federation) Stabæk
14	FW	Camilla Ose	25 May 1996 (aged 18)	(Norwegian Football Federation) Kolbotn
15	FW	Karina Sævik	24 March 1996 (aged 18)	(Norwegian Football Federation) Avaldsnes
17	FW	Inger Bjerke	15 February 1995 (aged 19)	(Norwegian Football Federation) Røa

=== Belgium ===
Head coach: Kristiaan Van Der Haegen

No.	Pos.	Player	Date of birth (age)	Club
1	GK	Justien Odeurs	30 May 1997 (aged 17)	(Royal Belgian Football Association) Anderlecht
12	GK	Diede Lemey	7 October 1996 (aged 17)	(Royal Belgian Football Association) Anderlecht
2	DF	Karen Verrydt	12 April 1995 (aged 19)	(Royal Belgian Football Association) Lierse
7	DF	Elien Van Wynendaele	19 February 1995 (aged 19)	(Royal Belgian Football Association) Club Brugge
11	DF	Chloë Van Mingeroet	18 March 1997 (aged 17)	(Royal Belgian Football Association) Lierse
16	DF	Jody Vangheluwe	15 July 1997 (aged 17)	(Royal Belgian Football Association) Club Brugge
18	DF	Britt Vanhamel	29 December 1997 (aged 16)	(Royal Belgian Football Association) Anderlecht
21	DF	Sheryl Merchiers	22 January 1997 (aged 17)	(Royal Belgian Football Association) Zulte Waregem
22	DF	Pauline Windels	5 August 1995 (aged 18)	(Royal Belgian Football Association) Club Brugge
4	MF	Tine De Caigny	9 June 1997 (aged 17)	(Royal Belgian Football Association) Club Brugge
5	MF	Tinne Van den Bergh	14 January 1995 (aged 19)	(Royal Belgian Football Association) Lierse
6	MF	Elke Van Gorp	15 May 1995 (aged 19)	(Royal Belgian Football Association) Lierse
8	MF	Magali Dinon	23 November 1996 (aged 17)	(Royal Belgian Football Association) Standard Liège
10	MF	Silke Leynen	6 April 1995 (aged 19)	(Royal Belgian Football Association) Lierse
14	MF	Isabelle Iliano	2 March 1997 (aged 17)	(Royal Belgian Football Association) Gent
9	FW	Lucinda Michez	27 April 1995 (aged 19)	(Royal Belgian Football Association) Anderlecht
15	FW	Margaux Van Ackere	13 November 1996 (aged 17)	(Royal Belgian Football Association) Gent
17	FW	Lola Wajnblum	22 January 1996 (aged 18)	(Royal Belgian Football Association) Anderlecht

=== Netherlands ===
Head coach: Andre Koolhof

No.	Pos.	Player	Date of birth (age)	Club
1	GK	Jennifer Vreugdenhil	12 January 1995 (aged 19)	(Royal Dutch Football Association) ADO Den Haag
16	GK	Nienke Olthof	23 April 1995 (aged 19)	(Royal Dutch Football Association) Heerenveen
2	DF	Cornelia Peels	18 March 1996 (aged 18)	(Royal Dutch Football Association) PSV
3	DF	Dominique Janssen	17 January 1995 (aged 19)	(German Football Association) SGS Essen
4	DF	Danique Kerkdijk	1 May 1996 (aged 18)	(Royal Dutch Football Association) Twente
5	DF	Daniëlle Kuikstra	7 March 1995 (aged 19)	(Royal Dutch Football Association) Heerenveen
12	DF	Lucie Akkerman	11 August 1996 (aged 17)	(Royal Dutch Football Association) Heerenveen
15	DF	Lauren Delleman	14 January 1995 (aged 19)	(Royal Dutch Football Association) Ajax
6	MF	Kim Mourmans	1 April 1995 (aged 19)	(Royal Belgian Football Association) Standard Liège
8	MF	Inessa Kaagman	17 April 1996 (aged 18)	(Royal Dutch Football Association) Ajax
10	MF	Jill Roord	22 April 1997 (aged 17)	(Royal Dutch Football Association) Twente
17	MF	Sharon Bruinenberg	22 August 1996 (aged 17)	(Royal Dutch Football Association) PEC Zwolle
7	FW	Jeslynn Kuijpers	23 June 1995 (aged 19)	(Royal Dutch Football Association) PSV
9	FW	Vivianne Miedema	15 July 1996 (aged 18)	(German Football Association) Bayern Munich
11	FW	Lineth Beerensteyn	11 October 1996 (aged 17)	(Royal Dutch Football Association) ADO Den Haag
13	FW	Simone Kets	30 July 1996 (aged 17)	(Royal Dutch Football Association) PEC Zwolle
14	FW	Laura Strik	27 June 1996 (aged 18)	(Royal Dutch Football Association) PSV
18	FW	Sisca Folkertsma	21 May 1997 (aged 17)	(Royal Dutch Football Association) Heerenveen

=== Scotland ===
Head coach: Gareth Evans

No.	Pos.	Player	Date of birth (age)	Club
1	GK	Megan Cunningham	14 July 1995 (aged 19)	(Scottish Football Association) Hamilton Academical
12	GK	Jenna Fife	1 December 1995 (aged 18)	(Scottish Football Association) Hibernian
3	DF	Fiona Brown	31 March 1995 (aged 19)	(Scottish Football Association) Glasgow City
5	DF	Rachael O'Neil	5 May 1996 (aged 18)	(Scottish Football Association) Rangers
7	DF	Claire Williamson	1 June 1996 (aged 18)	(Scottish Football Association) Hibernian
16	DF	Emily McKerlie	2 January 1996 (aged 18)	(Scottish Football Association) Celtic
17	DF	Georgie Rafferty	11 June 1997 (aged 17)	(Scottish Football Association) Glasgow City
2	MF	Chloe Arthur	21 January 1995 (aged 19)	(Scottish Football Association) Celtic
4	MF	Lucy Graham	10 October 1996 (aged 17)	(Scottish Football Association) Hibernian
6	MF	Lizzie Arnot	1 March 1996 (aged 18)	(Scottish Football Association) Hibernian
8	MF	Caroline Weir	20 June 1995 (aged 19)	(The Football Association) Arsenal
10	MF	Hannah Stewart	28 December 1996 (aged 17)	(Scottish Football Association) Aberdeen
9	FW	Zoe Ness	24 March 1996 (aged 18)	(The Football Association) Durham
11	FW	Abbi Grant	11 December 1995 (aged 18)	(Scottish Football Association) Glasgow City
13	FW	Katey Turner	9 October 1996 (aged 17)	(Scottish Football Association) Hamilton Academical
14	FW	Rachel Halliday	8 June 1995 (aged 19)	(Scottish Football Association) Hamilton Academical
15	FW	Abi Harrison	7 December 1995 (aged 18)	(Scottish Football Association) Celtic
18	FW	Carolina Richardson	5 July 1995 (aged 19)	(Scottish Football Association) Hamilton Academical

== Group B ==
=== England ===
Head coach: Brent Hills

No.	Pos.	Player	Date of birth (age)	Club
1	GK	Sophie Baggaley	29 November 1996 (aged 17)	(The Football Association) Birmingham City
13	GK	Kirstie Levell	7 January 1997 (aged 17)	(The Football Association) Everton
2	DF	Rosella Ayane	16 March 1996 (aged 18)	(The Football Association) Chelsea
3	DF	Molly Bartrip	1 June 1996 (aged 18)	(The Football Association) Reading
9	DF	Rebecca Lloyd	15 March 1997 (aged 17)	(The Football Association) Birmingham City
11	DF	Ashleigh Mills	9 March 1996 (aged 18)	(The Football Association) Doncaster Rovers Belles
12	DF	Elisha N'Dow	13 October 1996 (aged 17)	(The Football Association) Aston Villa
15	DF	Vyan Sampson	2 July 1996 (aged 18)	(The Football Association) Arsenal
4	MF	Jodie Brett	9 March 1996 (aged 18)	(The Football Association) Chelsea
5	MF	Maddy Cusack	28 October 1995 (aged 18)	(The Football Association) Aston Villa
6	MF	Jenna Dear	29 May 1996 (aged 18)	(The Football Association) Chelsea
16	MF	Fran Steele	2 October 1996 (aged 17)	(The Football Association) Arsenal
17	MF	Millie Turner	7 July 1996 (aged 18)	(The Football Association) Everton
7	FW	Coral Haines	21 June 1996 (aged 18)	(The Football Association) Birmingham City
8	FW	Carla Humphrey	15 December 1996 (aged 17)	(The Football Association) Arsenal
10	FW	Sarah Mayling	20 March 1997 (aged 17)	(The Football Association) Aston Villa
14	FW	Jemma Purfield	21 February 1997 (aged 17)	(The Football Association) Doncaster Rovers Belles
18	FW	Claudia Walker	10 June 1996 (aged 18)	(The Football Association) Liverpool

=== Republic of Ireland ===
Head coach: Dave Connell

No.	Pos.	Player	Date of birth (age)	Club
1	GK	Brooke Dunne	27 February 1997 (aged 17)	(Football Association of Ireland) Peamount United
16	GK	Amanda McQuillan	24 March 1998 (aged 16)	(Football Association of Ireland) Shelbourne
2	DF	Grace Wright	18 February 1995 (aged 19)	(United States Soccer Federation) Texas A&M Aggies
3	DF	Savannah McCarthy	26 March 1997 (aged 17)	(Football Association of Ireland) UCD Waves
4	DF	Lauren Dwyer	25 September 1996 (aged 17)	(Football Association of Ireland) Raheny United
5	DF	Ciara O'Connell	9 June 1995 (aged 19)	(Football Association of Ireland) Cork City
7	DF	Keeva Keenan	16 August 1997 (aged 16)	(Football Association of Ireland) Raheny United
12	DF	Ciara McNamara	30 June 1996 (aged 18)	(Football Association of Ireland) Cork City
6	MF	Chloe Mustaki	29 July 1995 (aged 18)	(Football Association of Ireland) Peamount United
8	MF	Amy O'Connor	19 January 1996 (aged 18)	(Football Association of Ireland) Cork City
14	MF	Shannon Carson	23 March 1996 (aged 18)	(Football Association of Ireland) Cork City
15	MF	Hayley Nolan	7 March 1997 (aged 17)	(Football Association of Ireland) Peamount United
18	MF	Roma McLaughlin	6 March 1998 (aged 16)	(Football Association of Ireland) Greencastle
9	FW	Megan Connolly	7 March 1997 (aged 17)	(Football Association of Ireland) College Corinthians
10	FW	Clare Shine	18 May 1995 (aged 19)	(Football Association of Ireland) Raheny United
11	FW	Katie McCabe	21 September 1995 (aged 18)	(Football Association of Ireland) Raheny United
13	FW	Sarah Rowe	25 July 1995 (aged 18)	(Football Association of Ireland) Ballina Town
17	FW	Jessica Gargan	10 March 1997 (aged 17)	(Football Association of Ireland) Peamount United

=== Spain ===
Head coach: Jorge Vilda

No.	Pos.	Player	Date of birth (age)	Club
1	GK	Paula Canals	20 June 1996 (aged 18)	(Royal Spanish Football Federation) Espanyol
13	GK	Sara Serrat	15 September 1995 (aged 18)	(Royal Spanish Football Federation) Sporting de Huelva
2	DF	Celia Jiménez	20 June 1995 (aged 19)	(United States Soccer Federation) Iowa Western Reivers
3	DF	Marta Turmo Janssen	27 June 1996 (aged 18)	(Royal Spanish Football Federation) Sant Gabriel
4	DF	Garazi Murua	24 January 1995 (aged 19)	(Royal Spanish Football Federation) Athletic Club
5	DF	Núria Garrote	10 June 1997 (aged 17)	(Royal Spanish Football Federation) Levante Badalona
10	DF	Núria Mendoza	15 December 1995 (aged 18)	(Royal Spanish Football Federation) Espanyol
18	DF	Paola Soldevila	7 December 1996 (aged 17)	(Royal Spanish Football Federation) Sant Gabriel
6	MF	Leire Baños	29 November 1996 (aged 17)	(Royal Spanish Football Federation) Real Sociedad
9	MF	Maitane López	13 March 1995 (aged 19)	(Royal Spanish Football Federation) Collerense
14	MF	Sonia Fraile	22 April 1997 (aged 17)	(Royal Spanish Football Federation) SPA Alicante
15	MF	Ainoa Campo	17 June 1996 (aged 18)	(Royal Spanish Football Federation) Parquesol
16	MF	Andrea Falcón	28 February 1997 (aged 17)	(Royal Spanish Football Federation) Barcelona
7	FW	María Díaz Cirauqui	5 May 1995 (aged 19)	(Royal Spanish Football Federation) Athletic Club
8	FW	Mariona Caldentey	19 March 1996 (aged 18)	(Royal Spanish Football Federation) Collerense
11	FW	Sheila Guijarro	26 September 1996 (aged 17)	(Royal Spanish Football Federation) Levante
12	FW	Nahikari García	10 March 1997 (aged 17)	(Royal Spanish Football Federation) Real Sociedad
14	FW	Alba Redondo	27 August 1996 (aged 17)	(Royal Spanish Football Federation) Fundación Albacete

=== Sweden ===
Head coach: Calle Barrling

No.	Pos.	Player	Date of birth (age)	Club
1	GK	Zećira Mušović	26 May 1996 (aged 18)	(Swedish Football Association) Rosengård
12	GK	Emma Holmgren	13 May 1997 (aged 17)	(Swedish Football Association) Sirius
2	DF	Elin Björklund	28 July 1995 (aged 18)	(Swedish Football Association) Rosengård
3	DF	Julia Ekholm	17 June 1996 (aged 18)	(Swedish Football Association) Bollstanäs
4	DF	Elin Karlsson	9 July 1995 (aged 19)	(Swedish Football Association) Kristianstads DFF
5	DF	Nellie Karlsson	9 July 1995 (aged 19)	(Swedish Football Association) Kristianstads DFF
13	DF	Nathalie Björn	4 May 1997 (aged 17)	(Swedish Football Association) AIK
6	MF	Julia Wahlberg	29 September 1995 (aged 18)	(Swedish Football Association) BK Häcken
7	MF	Filippa Curmack	2 August 1995 (aged 18)	(Swedish Football Association) Jitex BK
8	MF	Fanny Andersson	27 February 1995 (aged 19)	(Swedish Football Association) Sirius
14	MF	Anna Oskarsson	3 November 1995 (aged 18)	(Swedish Football Association) Jitex BK
15	MF	Maja Norrhamn	24 August 1996 (aged 17)	(Swedish Football Association) Kristianstads DFF
16	MF	Filippa Angeldahl	14 July 1997 (aged 17)	(Swedish Football Association) AIK
17	MF	Emma Jansson	9 May 1996 (aged 18)	(Swedish Football Association) Hammarby
9	FW	Stina Blackstenius	5 February 1996 (aged 18)	(Swedish Football Association) Linköping
10	FW	Lina Hurtig	5 September 1995 (aged 18)	(Swedish Football Association) Umeå IK
11	FW	Lotta Ökvist	17 February 1997 (aged 17)	(Swedish Football Association) Piteå IF
18	FW	Julia Zigiotti Olme	24 December 1997 (aged 16)	(Swedish Football Association) Bollstanäs
