= Athenea del Castillo =

Spanish footballer (born 2000)

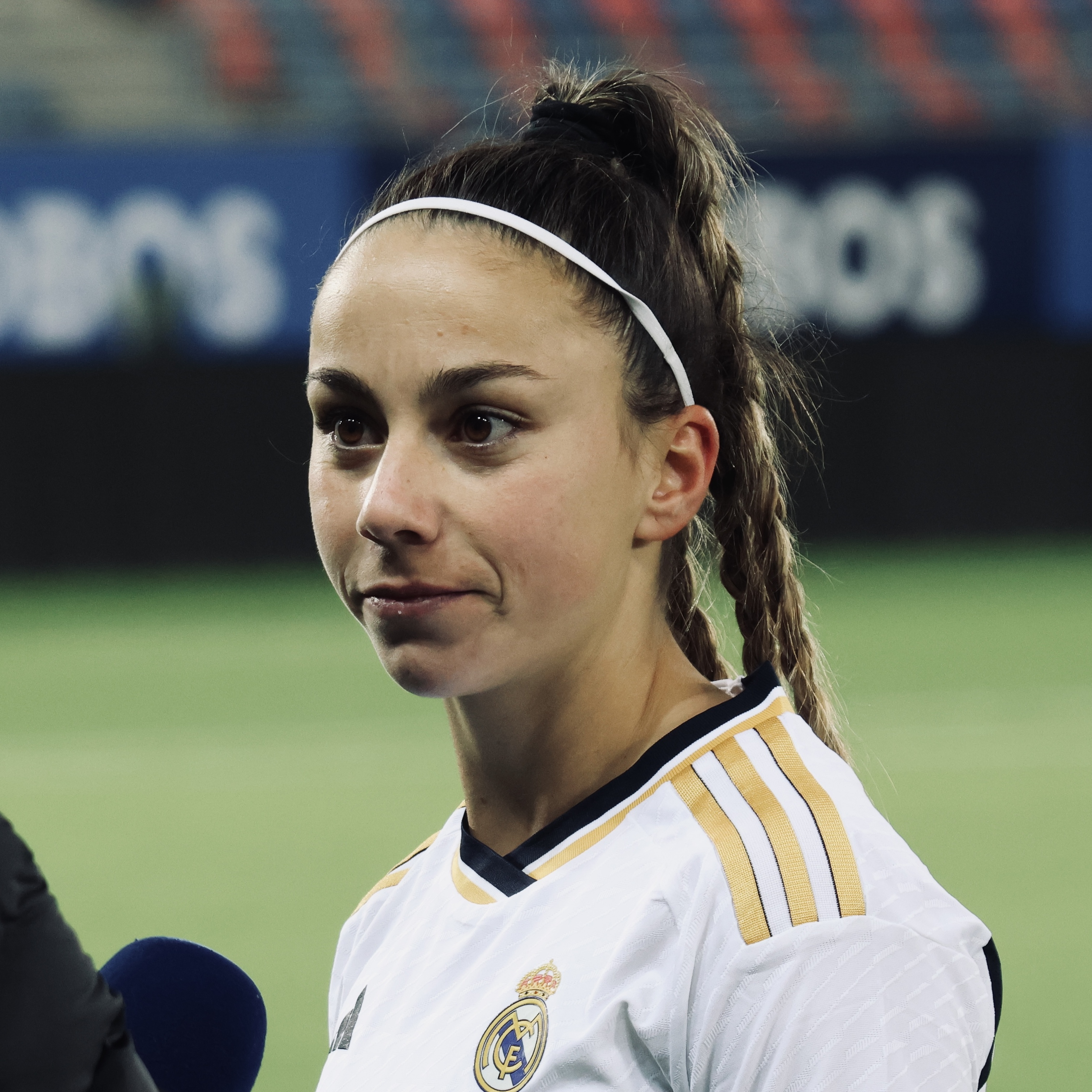
- Athenea with Real Madrid in 2023

Personal information
- Full name: Athenea del Castillo Beivide
- Date of birth: 24 October 2000 (age 26)
- Place of birth: Solares, Spain
- Height: 1.61 m (5 ft 3 in)
- Position: Winger

Team information
- Current team: Real Madrid
- Number: 10

Youth career
- 2011–2013: Reocín
- 2013–2017: Ave Fénix Racing

Senior career*
Years	Team	Apps	(Gls)
2017–2019	Racing Féminas	46	(37)
2019–2021	Deportivo	49	(11)
2021–	Real Madrid	149	(32)

International career^{‡}
2018–2019	Spain U19	13	(2)
2022	Spain U23	1	(1)
2019	Cantabria	1	(1)
2020–	Spain	70	(18)
Medal record
Women's football
Representing Spain
FIFA Women's World Cup
Winner	2023 Australia–New Zealand
UEFA Women's Championship
Runner-up	2025 Switzerland
UEFA Women's Nations League
Winner	2024 France–Netherlands–Spain
UEFA Women's Under-19 Championship
Winner	2018 Switzerland
- * Club domestic league appearances and goals as of 21:19, 24 October 2026 (UTC) ‡ National team caps and goals as of 21:19, 24 October 2026 (UTC)

Athenea del Castillo Beivide (born 24 October 2000), known as Athenea, is a Spanish professional footballer who plays as a winger for Liga F club Real Madrid CF and the Spain national team.

== Club career ==
=== Early career ===
Athenea started playing at Reocín in Cantabria at the age of 11. Later she moved to Ave Fénix Racing where she remained until the end of the 2018–19 Segunda División season, scoring 37 goals in 46 games. Her time there encompassed a 2017 merger whereby the team became part of Racing Santander.

=== Deportivo ===
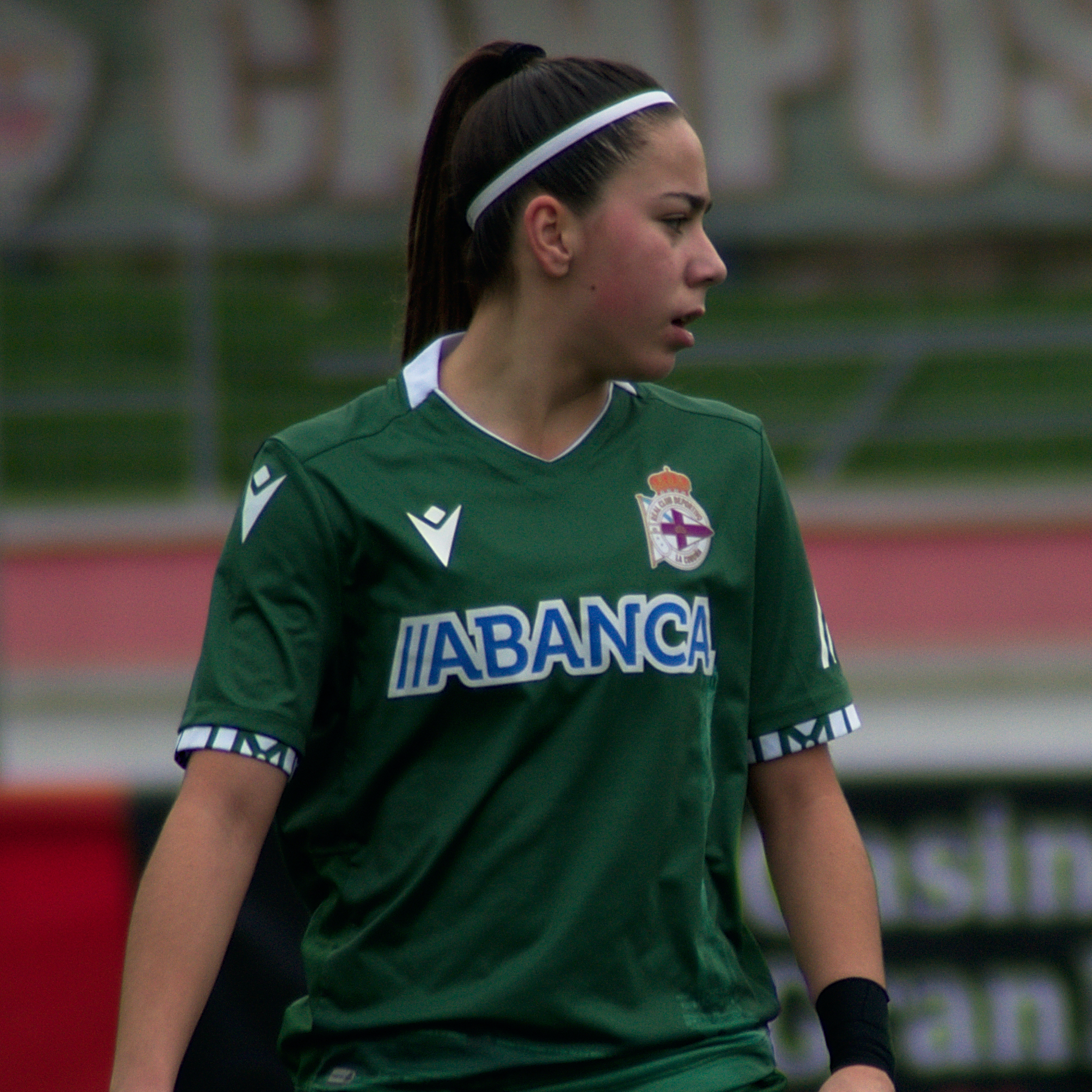
Athenea with Deportivo Abanca in 2019

In August 2019, it was announced that Athenea would be joining the newly promoted Primera División club, Deportivo Abanca, without the permission of her old club who tried to retain her registration, while the Galicians maintained their offer of a professional contract took precedence. Finally, in September, Racing Féminas formally allowed her transfer.

On 8 September 2019, Athenea made her Primera División debut for Deportivo against RCD Espanyol and scored her first goal on 19 January 2020. In its first season the team was one of the revelations of the championship and finished in fourth position. The following year, and after numerous casualties, the team suffered throughout the course until finally losing the category on the penultimate matchday after suffering a defeat against Real Betis. At the end of the championship and her contract, she signed for the Real Madrid, a team qualified to compete in the Champions League.

=== Real Madrid ===
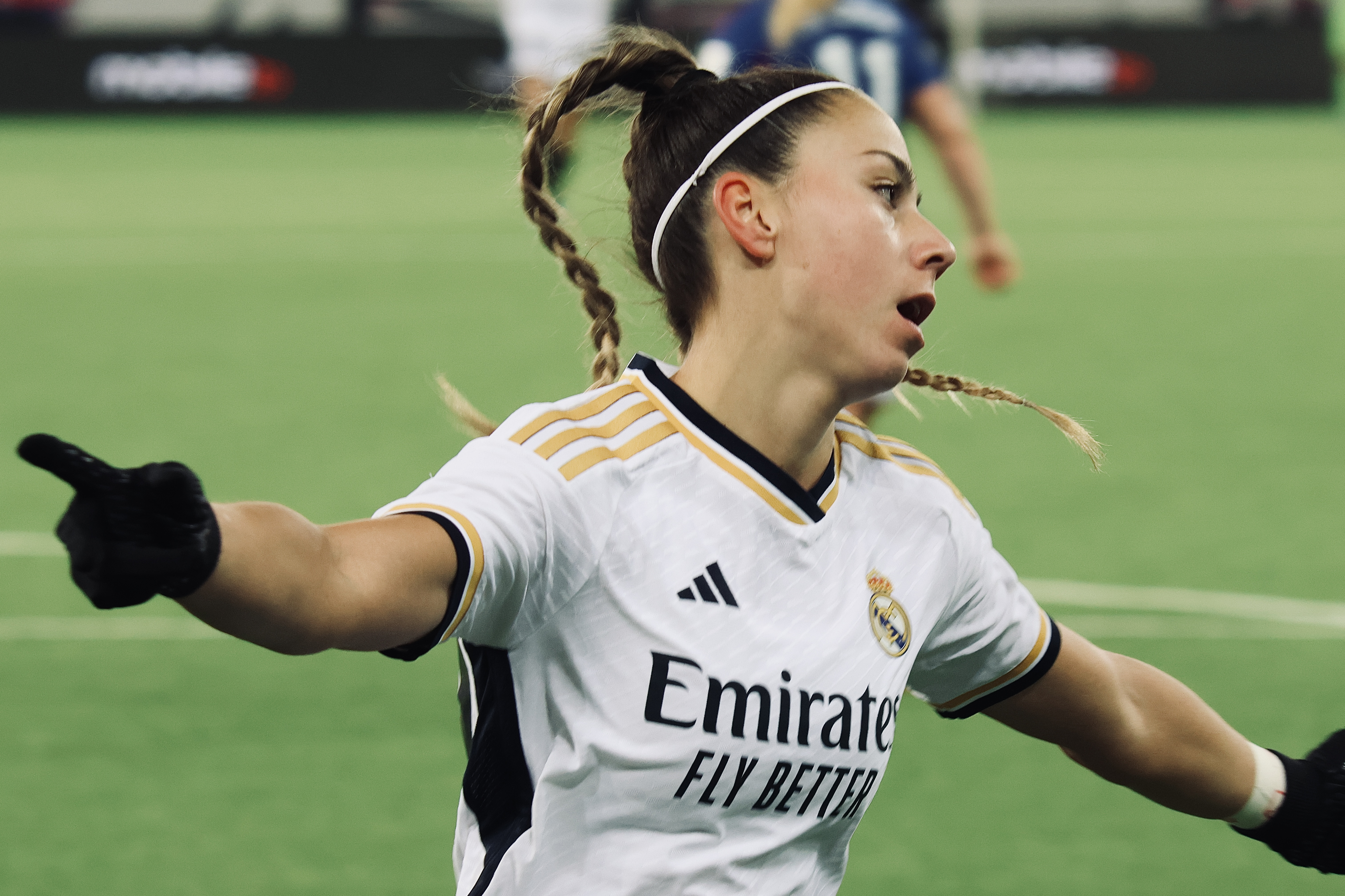
Athenea with Real Madrid in 2023

On 26 July 2021, following Deportivo's relegation, it was announced that she would be joining Real Madrid. Her debut with the Real Madrid took place in the continental competition. The first leg of the qualifying round against Manchester City ended with a 1–1 draw, where Athenea was named one of the most outstanding players in the match. Just a few days later she made her debut in the League Championship in the defeat against Levante UD. In an irregular performance of the team during the first months of competition, Athenea was one of the players with the best performance, being chosen by Real Madrid fans as the best player of the month of September. Her first goal as a Real Madrid player was on matchday eleven against Villarreal CF, opening scoring in the 2–0 victory.

Noted for her dominant verticality and dribbling in the championship, she and teammate Esther González were hailed for their performances in the 3–1 victory against Madrid CFF that seemed to certify the new direction of the team, more consolidated and tactically structured.

According to a statistical report published by the digital sports newspaper Relevo in October 2022, Athenea was the Liga F winger with the most successful dribbles.

By May 2026, Athenea had made over 200 appearances for Real Madrid, becoming the club’s second-most capped player. She had also scored more than 40 goals in all competitions, making her the club’s second-highest goalscorer.

== International career ==
Athenea was called into the Spain U19 squad for the 2018 UEFA Under-19 Championship in Switzerland, where the team won the title. She was also part of the squad that finished runners-up in the same competition a year later.

She made her senior international debut on October 23, 2020, coming on as an 86th-minute substitute in a match against Czechia, becoming the first serving Deportivo player to gain a full cap. On September 21, 2021, she scored her first international goal in the 7–0 victory against Hungary. In the friendly against Morocco she scored a double in a 3–0 victory.

In February 2022, after several consecutive call-ups with the senior team, she was left off the initial list for the 2022 Arnold Clark Cup, which would serve as preparation for Euro 2022. On those dates Athenea was called up with the under-23 team to play a friendly in Belgium. However, after Mariona Caldentey's injury in the first match of the tournament, Athenea was called to join the group. In Spain's second match in the tournament, Athenea played the second half and was chosen as best player of the match. After another good performance against Canada, Athenea was chosen as the best player of the tournament.

She was selected for the Euro 2022 squad. She played in all three group stage matches, coming on as a substitute twice and then starting in the third game. In the 2-1 quarter-final loss against eventual champions England, she assisted Esther González's goal.

Athenea made six appearances and scored one goal for Spain in the 2023 World Cup qualifiers. Athenea was called to the squad for the 2023 World Cup. She suffered a sprained ankle during the game against Zambia. She missed the next group stage match against Japan but returned to play after that. Spain won the final against England 1-0 and were declared world champions.

On 10 June 2025, Athenea was called up to the Spain squad for the UEFA Euro 2025.

== Career statistics ==
=== Club ===
As of match played 24 October 2026

Appearances and goals by club, season and competition
Club	Season	League			Copa de la Reina		Europe		Other		Total	
Club	Season	Division	Apps	Goals	Apps	Goals	Apps	Goals	Apps	Goals	Apps	Goals
CDE Racing Féminas	2017–18	Primera Federación	24	15	—		—		—		24	15
CDE Racing Féminas	2018–19	Primera Federación	22	22	—		—		—		22	22
CDE Racing Féminas	Total		46	37	—		—		—		46	37
Deportivo de La Coruña	2019–20	Liga F	17	2	2	1	—		—		19	3
Deportivo de La Coruña	2020–21	Liga F	32	9	0	0	—		—		32	9
Deportivo de La Coruña	Total		49	11	2	1	—		—		51	12
Real Madrid	2021–22	Liga F	29	5	3	0	10 (Note: Appearances in UEFA Women's Champions League)	0	1 (Note: Appearance(s) in Supercopa de España Femenina)	0	43	5
Real Madrid	2022–23	Liga F	30	6	4	1	8	3	1	0	43	10
Real Madrid	2023–24	Liga F	30	8	2	1	8	2	1	0	41	11
Real Madrid	2024–25	Liga F	27	6	4	0	8	2	2	0	41	8
Real Madrid	2025–26	Liga F	28	6	2	0	12	1	2	1	44	8
Real Madrid	2026–27	Liga F	5	1	0	0	2	0	0	0	7	1
Real Madrid	Total		149	32	15	2	48	8	7	1	219	43
Career total			244	80	17	3	48	8	7	1	316	92

=== International ===
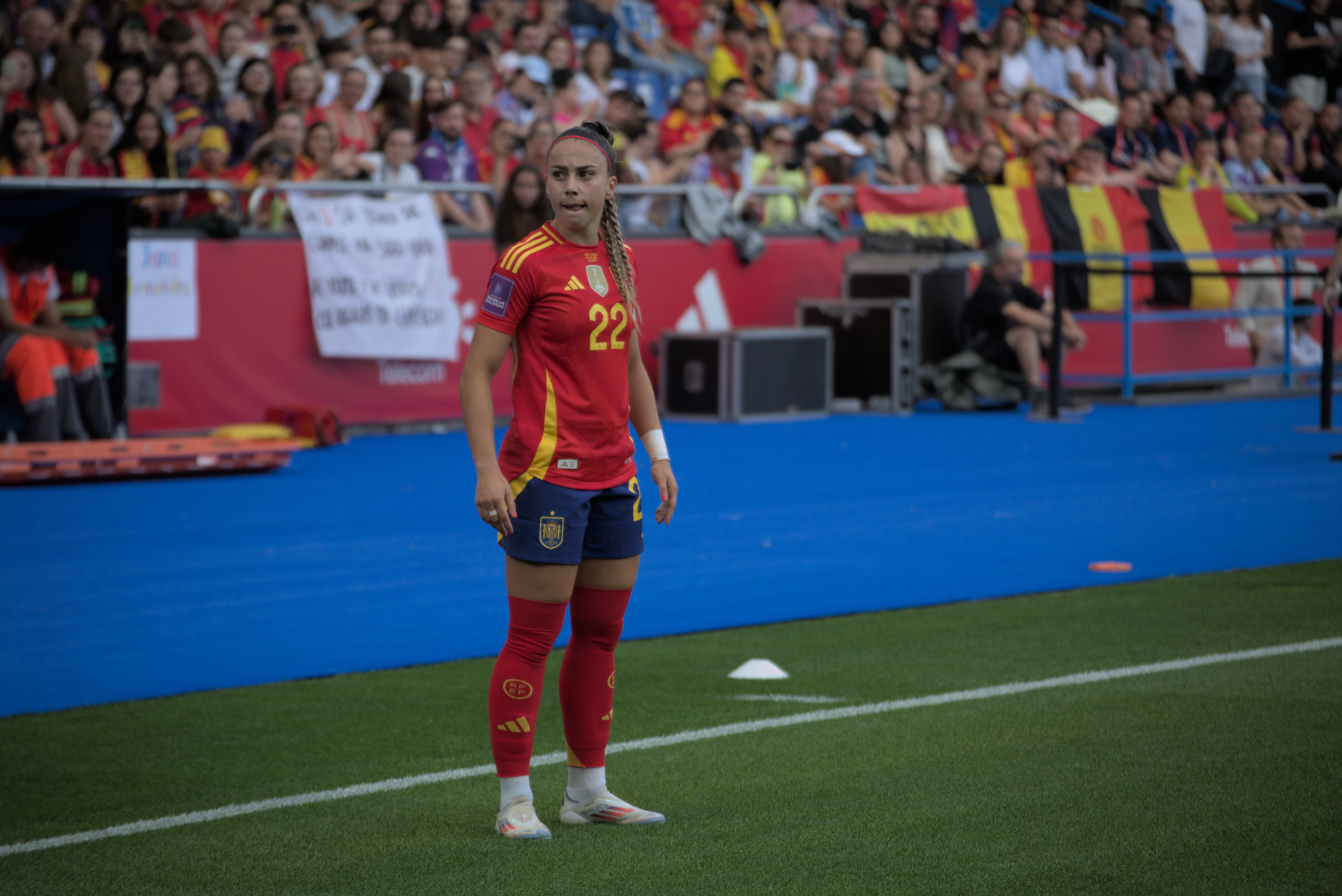
Athenea with Spain in 2025

As of match played 10 October 2026

Appearances and goals by national team and year
National team	Year	Apps	Goals
Spain	2020	1	0
Spain	2021	6	3
Spain	2022	14	1
Spain	2023	15	8
Spain	2024	17	1
Spain	2025	14	5
Spain	2026	3	0
Total		70	18

Scores and results list Spain's goal tally first, score column indicates score after each del Castillo goal.

List of international goals scored by Athenea del Castillo
No.	Date	Venue	Opponent	Score	Result	Competition
1	21 September 2021	Hidegkuti Nándor Stadion, Budapest, Hungary	Hungary	4–0	7–0	2023 FIFA Women's World Cup qualifying
2	21 October 2021	Estadio Príncipe Felipe, Cáceres, Spain	Morocco	1–0	3–0	Friendly
3	21 October 2021	Estadio Príncipe Felipe, Cáceres, Spain	Morocco	3–0	3–0	Friendly
4	11 November 2022	Estadio Municipal Álvarez Claro, Melilla, Spain	Argentina	6–0	7–0	Friendly
5	22 February 2023	McDonald Jones Stadium, Newcastle, Australia	Czech Republic	3–0	3–0	2023 Cup of Nations
6	11 April 2023	Estadi Municipal de Can Misses, Ibiza, Spain	China	1–0	3–0	Friendly
7	29 June 2023	Estadio Román Suárez Puerta, Avilés, Spain	Panama	7–0	7–0	Friendly
8	22 September 2023	Gamla Ullevi, Gothenburg, Sweden	Sweden	1–1	3–2	2023–24 UEFA Women's Nations League
9	31 October 2023	Stadion Letzigrund, Zürich, Switzerland	Switzerland	5–1	7–1	2023–24 UEFA Women's Nations League
10	31 October 2023	Stadion Letzigrund, Zürich, Switzerland	Switzerland	6–1	7–1	2023–24 UEFA Women's Nations League
11	1 December 2023	Estadio Municipal de Pasarón, Pontevedra, Spain	Italy	1–0	2–3	2023–24 UEFA Women's Nations League
12	5 December 2023	La Rosaleda Stadium, Málaga, Spain	Sweden	2–3	5–3	2023–24 UEFA Women's Nations League
13	31 July 2024	Nouveau Stade de Bordeaux, Bordeaux, France	Brazil	1–0	2–0	2024 Summer Olympics
14	30 May 2025	Den Dreef, Leuven, Belgium	Belgium	3–0	5–1	2025 UEFA Women's Nations League
15	30 May 2025	Den Dreef, Leuven, Belgium	Belgium	4–0	5–1	2025 UEFA Women's Nations League
16	27 June 2025	Butarque, Leganés, Spain	Japan	3–1	3–1	Friendly
17	11 July 2025	Stadion Wankdorf, Bern, Switzerland	Italy	1–1	3–1	UEFA Women's Euro 2025
18	18 July 2025	Stadion Wankdorf, Bern, Switzerland	Switzerland	1–0	2–0	UEFA Women's Euro 2025

== Honours ==
Spain

- FIFA Women's World Cup: 2023
- UEFA Women's Championship runner-up: 2025
- UEFA Women's Nations League: 2023–24, 2025

Spain U19

- UEFA Women's Under-19 Championship: 2018

Individual

- Primera División Team of the Year: 2023–24
- Liga F Player of the Month: January 2026
