= Ander Astralaga =

Spanish footballer (born 2004)

Personal information
- Full name: Ander Astralaga Aranguren
- Date of birth: 3 March 2004 (age 22)
- Place of birth: Berango, Spain
- Height: 1.90 m (6 ft 3 in)
- Position: Goalkeeper

Team information
- Current team: Atlético Madrid B

Youth career
- 2013–2014: Karabigane
- 2014–2018: Athletic Bilbao
- 2018–2023: Barcelona

Senior career*
Years	Team	Apps	(Gls)
2022–2026	Barcelona B	37	(0)
2025–2026	→ Granada (loan)	16	(0)
2026–	Atlético Madrid B	0	(0)

International career^{‡}
2021–2022	Spain U18	6	(0)
2022–2023	Spain U19	4	(0)
2025–	Spain U21	2	(0)
- * Club domestic league appearances and goals as of 28 July 2026 ‡ National team caps and goals as of 14 October 2025 (UTC)

Ander Astralaga Aranguren (born 3 March 2004) is a Spanish professional footballer who plays as a goalkeeper for Atlético Madrileño.

== Club career ==
Born in Berango, Biscay, Basque Country, Astralaga started his career with local club Karabigane FT. In 2014, he moved to Athletic Bilbao's youth academy. In the summer of 2018 Astralaga came to La Masia and joined the U16 team. There he continued to grow and, through the team's youth system, he played his first match for Barça Atlètic against Betis Deportivo on 27 March 2022.

On 28 January 2023 Astralaga was for the first time included in the match day squad against Girona FC. In April 2023 he reached an agreement with FC Barcelona to extend his contract until June 2025. In the final game of 2023, on 22 December in Dallas, he made his unofficial senior team debut during a friendly against Club America.

On 29 June 2025, Astralaga was loaned to Segunda División side Granada for one year. At the end of his loan spell, Barcelona allowed Astralaga's contract to expire.

On 23 July 2026, following the expiration of his contract at Barcelona, Astralaga signed with Atlético Madrileño on a two-year deal.

== International career ==
Ander Astralaga has represented Spain at international youth level. On 10 October 2021 he made his debut for Spain U18 against Romania U18. He played a total of six games, before being promoted to the U19 team. On 29 August 2022 Astralaga made his debut for the U19 team against Israel U19 in a friendly, which ended in a 0-0 draw. In his third match for the U19 team on 10 July 2023 he played against Norway U19 in the U19 European Championship, which ended in a 0-0 draw.

== Personal life ==
His younger sister Eunate (born 2005) is also a footballer and goalkeeper who was playing for Athletic Club Femenino B and for the Spain women's under-19 team in 2024.

== Career statistics ==
=== Club ===
As of 19 October 2024

Appearances and goals by club, season and competition
Club	Season	League			Copa del Rey		Continental		Other		Total	
Club	Season	Division	Apps	Goals	Apps	Goals	Apps	Goals	Apps	Goals	Apps	Goals
Barcelona B	2021–22	Primera División RFEF	1	0	—		—		—		1	0
Barcelona B	2022–23	Primera Federación	2	0	—		—		1 (Note: Appearance in 2023 Primera Federación play-offs)	0	3	0
Barcelona B	2023–24	Primera Federación	16	0	—		—		—		16	0
Barcelona B	2024–25	Primera Federación	4	0	—		—		—		4	0
Barcelona B	Total		23	0	0	0	0	0	1	0	24	0
Barcelona	2024–25	La Liga	0	0	0	0	0	0	—		0	0
Career total			23	0	0	0	0	0	1	0	24	0

== Honours ==
Barcelona

- Copa del Rey: 2024–25
- Supercopa de España: 2025
