= Olga San Nicolás =

Spanish footballer (born 2005)

Olga
Personal information
- Full name: Olga San Nicolás Rolando
- Date of birth: 23 March 2005 (age 21)
- Position: Forward

Team information
- Current team: Valencia
- Number: 26

Senior career*
Years	Team	Apps	(Gls)
2021–	Valencia	15	(1)

International career
	Spain U17	1	(0)
Medal record
Women's football
Representing Spain
UEFA Women's Under-19 Championship
Winner	2024 Lithuania
- * Club domestic league appearances and goals as of 15 May 2022

Olga San Nicolás Rolando (born 23 March 2005), simply known as Olga, is a Spanish professional footballer who plays as a forward for Liga F club Valencia CF.

== Club career ==
Olga has participated in 16 matches for Valencia (14 in the Women Spanish League and two in the Copa de Reina cup) for a total of minutes 528 minutes. She has scored one goal and assisted two in the 2021–22 season.

== Honours ==
Spain U19

- UEFA Women's Under-19 Championship: 2024
