= 2026–27 Real Madrid Femenino season =

Real Madrid Femenino
2026–27 season
- President: Florentino Pérez
- Coach: Pau Quesada
- Stadium: Alfredo Di Stéfano Stadium
- Liga F: Pre-season
- Copa de la Reina: Round of 16
- Supercopa de España: Semi-final
- UEFA Champions League: League phase
- Top goalscorer: League: Felicia Schröder (5); All: Felicia Schröder (8)
- Biggest win: Home: Real Madrid 3–2 Atlético Madrid (30 August 2026); Away: AFC Ajax 0–2 Real Madrid (26 August 2026)
- All statistics correct as of 3 September 2026.

The 2026–27 season is the eleventh in the history of Real Madrid Femenino and the club's seventh since being officially incorporated under the Real Madrid banner. During this campaign, the team will compete in the Primera División, the Copa de la Reina, the Supercopa de España, and the UEFA Champions League. Real Madrid Femenino hosts its home fixtures at the Alfredo Di Stéfano Stadium.

== Summary ==
On 10 June 2026, Real Madrid announced the departure of captain Misa Rodríguez after six years at the club. The following day, the club announced the signing of Elisa Senß from Eintracht Frankfurt on a contract until 2030. On 12 June, Real Madrid confirmed the departures of Caroline Weir and Teresa Abelleira, with Weir leaving as the club's all time leading goalscorer.

On 14 June, Real Madrid announced the signing of Andreia Jacinto from Real Sociedad on a four year contract. Later that day, the club also confirmed the departure of Yasmim Ribeiro. On 15 June, Real Madrid announced the departures of Rocío Gálvez after five years at the club and Naomie Feller after four years.

On 16 June, Real Madrid announced the signing of Lineth Beerensteyn on a three year contract. Two days later, on 18 June, Laia López was promoted from Real Madrid Femenino B to the first team. On 24 June, the club announced the signing of Felicia Schröder on a four year contract.

On 6 July, Real Madrid confirmed the departure of Hanna Bennison after one season at the club. On 11 July, the club announced the signing of Janou Levels from Wolfsburg on a four year contract. The following day, Sheila García departed after two years at the club. On 15 July, Silvia Cristóbal was promoted from Real Madrid Femenino B to the first team.

On 22 July, Alba Redondo left the club after two years, and on 28 July, Noe Bejarano was also promoted from Real Madrid Femenino B to the first team. On 6 August, Real Madrid announced the departure of Antônia Silva. On 24 August, Real Madrid announced the signing of Arianna Caruso on a four year contract. The following day, Irune Dorado was promoted from Real Madrid Femenino B to the first team.

== Kits ==
Home	Away	Third

Goalkeeper 1	Goalkeeper 2	Goalkeeper 3	Goalkeeper 4	Goalkeeper 5

== Players ==
=== Current squad ===
As of 3 August 2026

No.	Pos.	Nat.	Name	Age	Since
Goalkeepers
1	GK	(Germany)	Merle Frohms	31	2025
13	GK	(Spain)	Laia López	19	2023
Defenders
2	DF	(Spain)	Noe Bejarano	20	2023
3	DF	(Netherlands)	Janou Levels	26	2026
4	DF	(Spain)	Silvia Cristóbal	18	2021
14	DF	(Spain)	María Méndez	25	2024
21	DF	(Denmark)	Sara Holmgaard	27	2025
22	DF	(Sweden)	Bella Andersson	20	2025
23	DF	(France)	Maëlle Lakrar	26	2024
Midfielders
6	MF	(France)	Sandie Toletti	31	2022
8	MF	(Germany)	Sara Däbritz	31	2025
15	MF	(Spain)	Irune Dorado	18	2021
16	MF	(Sweden)	Filippa Angeldahl	29	2024
17	MF	(Portugal)	Andreia Jacinto	24	2026
20	MF	(Germany)	Elisa Senß	29	2026
24	MF	(Italy)	Arianna Caruso	27	2026
Forwards
5	FW	(Spain)	Paula Comendador	19	2021
7	FW	(Netherlands)	Lotte Keukelaar	21	2025
9	FW	(Denmark)	Signe Bruun	28	2023
10	FW	(Spain)	Athenea del Castillo (captain)	26	2021
11	FW	(Netherlands)	Lineth Beerensteyn	30	2026
12	FW	(Sweden)	Felicia Schröder	19	2026
18	FW	(Colombia)	Linda Caicedo	21	2023
19	FW	(Spain)	Eva Navarro	25	2024

== Transfers ==
=== In ===
Date	Pos.	Player	From	Type	Ref.
11 June 2026	MF	(Germany) Elisa Senß	(Germany) Eintracht Frankfurt	Free transfer	
14 June 2026	MF	(Portugal) Andreia Jacinto	(Spain) Real Sociedad	Free transfer	
16 June 2026	FW	(Netherlands) Lineth Beerensteyn	(Germany) VfL Wolfsburg	Free transfer	
18 June 2026	GK	(Spain) Laia López	(Spain) Real Madrid Femenino B	Promotion to the first team	
24 June 2026	FW	(Sweden) Felicia Schröder	(Sweden) BK Häcken	Transfer	
11 July 2026	DF	(Netherlands) Janou Levels	(Germany) VfL Wolfsburg	Transfer	
15 July 2026	DF	(Spain) Silvia Cristóbal	(Spain) Real Madrid Femenino B	Promotion to the first team	
28 July 2026	DF	(Spain) Noe Bejarano	(Spain) Real Madrid Femenino B	Promotion to the first team	
24 July 2026	MF	(Italy) Arianna Caruso	(Germany) Bayern Munich	Transfer	
25 July 2026	MF	(Spain) Irune Dorado	(Spain) Real Madrid Femenino B	Promotion to the first team	

=== Out ===
Date	Pos.	Player	To	Type	Ref.
10 June 2026	GK	(Spain) Misa Rodríguez	(England) Arsenal	End of contract	
12 June 2026	MF	(Scotland) Caroline Weir	(France) OL Lyonnes	End of contract	
12 June 2026	MF	(Spain) Teresa Abelleira		End of contract	
13 June 2025	DF	(Brazil) Yasmim		Contract termination	
15 June 2026	DF	(Spain) Rocío Gálvez	(Mexico) FC Juárez	End of contract	
15 June 2025	FW	(France) Naomie Feller	(France) PSG	End of contract	
6 July 2026	MF	(Sweden) Hanna Bennison	(Germany) Eintracht Frankfurt	Transfer	
12 July 2026	DF	(Spain) Sheila García	(Italy) Inter Milan	Transfer	
22 July 2026	FW	(Spain) Alba Redondo	(Italy) Juventus FC	Transfer	
6 August 2026	DF	(Brazil) Antônia Silva	(Brazil) Palmeiras	Transfer	

== Pre-season and friendlies ==
Win Draw Loss Fixtures

1 August 2026 1	Real Madrid (Spain)	2–0	(Spain) Madrid CFF	Madrid
	Méndez 69'; Comendador; 85'	Report		Stadium: Ciudad Real Madrid

5 August 2026 2	Real Madrid (Spain)	2–0	(England) Crystal Palace	Marbella
20:00 CEST	Keukelaar 32'; O'Brien 70' (o.g.)	Report		Stadium: Marbella Football Center

8 August 2026 3	Real Madrid (Spain)	2–4	(Spain) Sevilla	Marbella
20:00 CEST	Däbritz 88'; Schröder 90+4'	Report	Márquez 38'; Kanteh 64'; Gili 86'; Blom 90+2'	Stadium: Marbella Football Center

12 August 2026 4	Tottenham Hotspur (England)	1–2	(Spain) Real Madrid	Murcia
20:00 CEST	Hanson 5'	Report	Schröder 22'; Caicedo 25'	Stadium: Pinatar Arena

16 August 2026 5	Real Madrid (Spain)	2–1	(Spain) Deportivo	Madrid
20:00 CEST	Oihane 59'; Rubio 67'	Report	Pardo 57'	Stadium: Ciudad Real Madrid

== Statistics ==
=== Overall ===
As of 3 September 2026

No.	Position	Nationality	Player	Liga F		Copa de la Reina		Champions League		Supercopa de España	
No.	Position	Nationality	Player	Apps	Goals	Apps	Goals	Apps	Goals	Apps	Goals
1	GK	(Germany)	Merle Frohms	1	0	0	0	2	0	0	0
2	DF	(Spain)	Noe Bejarano	0	0	0	0	1	0	0	0
3	DF	(Netherlands)	Janou Levels	1	0	0	0	2	1	0	0
4	DF	(Spain)	Silvia Cristóbal	0	0	0	0	1	0	0	0
5	FW	(Spain)	Paula Comendador	0	0	0	0	1	0	0	0
6	MF	(France)	Sandie Toletti	1	1	0	0	1	0	0	0
7	FW	(Netherlands)	Lotte Keukelaar	1	0	0	0	2	0	0	0
8	MF	(Germany)	Sara Däbritz	0	0	0	0	0	0	0	0
9	FW	(Denmark)	Signe Bruun	0	0	0	0	0	0	0	0
10	FW	(Spain)	Athenea del Castillo	0	0	0	0	0	0	0	0
11	FW	(Netherlands)	Lineth Beerensteyn	1	0	0	0	2	0	0	0
12	FW	(Sweden)	Felicia Schröder	1	2	0	0	2	2	0	0
13	GK	(Spain)	Laia López	0	0	0	0	0	0	0	0
14	DF	(Spain)	María Méndez	1	0	0	0	2	0	0	0
15	MF	(Spain)	Irune Dorado	0	0	0	0	1	0	0	0
16	MF	(Sweden)	Filippa Angeldahl	1	0	0	0	2	0	0	0
17	MF	(Portugal)	Andreia Jacinto	1	0	0	0	2	0	0	0
18	FW	(Colombia)	Linda Caicedo	1	0	0	0	2	1	0	0
19	FW	(Spain)	Eva Navarro	1	0	0	0	2	0	0	0
20	MF	(Germany)	Elisa Senß	1	0	0	0	2	0	0	0
21	DF	(Denmark)	Sara Holmgaard	0	0	0	0	0	0	0	0
22	DF	(Sweden)	Bella Andersson	1	0	0	0	2	0	0	0
23	DF	(France)	Maëlle Lakrar	1	0	0	0	1	0	0	0
24	MF	(Italy)	Arianna Caruso	0	0	0	0	1	0	0	0

== Competitions ==
=== Overall record ===
Competition	First match	Last match	Starting round	Final position	Record							
Competition	First match	Last match	Starting round	Final position	Pld	W	D	L	GF	GA	GD	Win %
Liga F	30 August 2026	May 2027	Matchday 1	TBD	1	1	0	0	3	2	+1	100.00
Copa de la Reina	December 2026	TBD	Round of 16	TBD	0	0	0	0	0	0	+0	—
Supercopa de España	January 2027		Semi-finals	TBD	0	0	0	0	0	0	+0	—
UEFA Women's Champions League	26 August 2026	TBD	Third qualifying round	TBD	2	2	0	0	4	1	+3	100.00
Total					3	3	0	0	7	3	+4	100.00

Source: Soccerway

=== Liga F ===
==== League table ====
Pos	Team	Pld	W	D	L	GF	GA	GD	Pts	Qualification or relegation
1	Barcelona	11	9	1	1	42	6	+36	28	Qualification for the Champions League league phase
2	Real Madrid	11	7	3	1	26	21	+5	24	Qualification for the Champions League league phase
3	Atlético Madrid	11	7	1	3	24	13	+11	22	Qualification for the Champions League third qualifying round
4	Athletic Club	11	5	4	2	17	12	+5	19	
5	Tenerife	10	5	2	3	17	15	+2	17	

Updated to match(es) played on 15 November 2026. Source: LigaF.es
Rules for classification: 1) Points; 2) Head-to-head points; 3) Goal difference; 4) Number of goals scored

==== Results summary ====
Overall								Home						Away					
Pld	W	D	L	GF	GA	GD	Pts	W	D	L	GF	GA	GD	W	D	L	GF	GA	GD
9	7	1	1	22	17	+5	22	4	1	0	12	6	+6	3	0	1	10	11	−1

Last updated: 1 November 2026.
Source: La Liga

==== Results by round ====
Match	1	2	3	4	5	6	7	8	9	10	11	12	13	14	15	16	17	18	19	20	21	22	23	24	25	26	27	28	29	30
Ground	H	H	A	H	A	A	H	H	A																					
Result	W	D	W	W	W	L	W	W	W																					
Position	6	4	4	2	2	3	2																							

Updated to match(es) played on 1 November 2026. Source: La Liga
A = Away; H = Home; W = Win; D = Draw; L = Loss; P = Postponed

==== Matches ====
30 August 2026 1	Real Madrid	3–2	Atlético Madrid	Madrid
21:00 CEST (UTC+2)	Schröder 8', 44', (yellow card) 43' (red card); Toletti 15'	Report	Pérez (yellow card) 23'; Jensen 35', 45+6'; Giovana (red card) 68'	Stadium: Estadio Alfredo Di Stéfano; Attendance: 1,815; Referee: Alicia Espinosa Rios

6 September 2026 2	Real Madrid	0–0	Eibar	Madrid
20:30 CEST (UTC+2)	Zouhir (yellow card) 80'		Fernández (yellow card) 44'; Torrent (yellow card) 83'	Stadium: Estadio Alfredo Di Stéfano; Attendance: 816; Referee: Eugenia Gil Soriano

13 September 2026 3	Deportivo Abanca	0–2	Real Madrid	A Coruña
20:45 CEST (UTC+2)	Cabral (yellow card) 6'		Caideo (penalty missed) 9', 31'; Andersson (yellow card) 21', (goal) 39'	Stadium: ABANCA-RIAZOR; Referee: Elena Peláez Arnillas

20 September 2026 4	Real Madrid	3–1	Valencia	Paterna
20:30 CEST (UTC+2)	Senß 26'; Schröder 31'; del Castillo 90+4'		Pérez (yellow card) 37'; Prat (yellow card) 45'; Marcano 69'	Stadium: Estadio Antonio Puchades; Referee: Arantza Gallastegui Pérez

27 September 2026 5	Real Sociedad	3–5	Real Madrid	Zubieta
12:00 CEST (UTC+2)	Marcos 5', 50'; Laborde (yellow card) 39'; Fernández 85' (pen.), (yellow card) 90'		Beerensteyn 3'; Navarro (yellow card) 28'; Caicedo (yellow card) 63'; Däbritz 67', 70'; Andersson (yellow card) 79'; Schröder 87', 90+6'	Stadium: Estadio Zubieta XXI; Attendance: 725; Referee: Ainara Andrea Acevedo Dudley

4 October 2026 6	Barcelona	7–0	Real Madrid	Sant Joan Despí
19:00 CEST	Pina 4', 28', 32', 45'; Graham 33'; Pajor 55'; Schertenleib 88'		Navarro (yellow card) 19'; Caruso (yellow card) 52'; Caicedo (yellow card) 90'	Stadium: Estadi Johan Cruyff; Attendance: 40,533; Referee: María Gloria Planes

18 October 2026 7	Real Madrid	3–1	Espanyol	Madrid
20:30 CEST	Méndez (yellow card) 26'; Caicedo (yellow card) 40'; Däbritz 45+1'; Beerensteyn 70'; Schröder 80'		Torras (yellow card) 33'; García (yellow card) 57'; Iglesias 90+2'	Stadium: Estadio Alfredo Di Stéfano; Attendance: 1,003; Referee: Ágata Lopez

25 October 2026 8	Real Madrid	3–2	Tenerife	Madrid
16:00 CEST	Lakrar (yellow card) 22'; Beerensteyn 58'; Schröder 78'; Bruun 84'		Gramaglia 23' (pen.); Padilla 53'	Stadium: Estadio Alfredo Di Stéfano; Attendance: 1,005

1 November 2026 9	Sevilla	1–3	Real Madrid	Seville
18:00 CEST	Barrios 32'		Schröder 12'; Levels (yellow card) 48'; Caruso 86'; Beerensteyn 88'	Stadium: Estadio Jesús Navas; Referee: Jesús Gil Manzano

8 November 2026 10	Athletic Club	v	Real Madrid	Lezama
				Stadium: Instalaciones de Lezama Campo 2

15 November 2026 11	Real Madrid	v	Badalona Women	Madrid
				Stadium: Estadio Alfredo Di Stéfano

22 November 2026 12	Granada	v	Real Madrid	Granada
				Stadium: Ciudad Deportiva del Granada CF

9 December 2026 13	Real Madrid	v	Madrid CFF	Madrid
				Stadium: Estadio Alfredo Di Stéfano

13 December 2026 14	Alavés	v	Real Madrid	Vitoria-Gasteiz
				Stadium: Ciudad Deportiva José Luis Compañón

10 January 2027 15	Real Madrid	v	DUX Logroño	Madrid
				Stadium: Estadio Alfredo Di Stéfano

17 January 2027 16	Valencia	v	Real Madrid	Paterna
				Stadium: Estadio Antonio Puchades

24 January 2027 17	Real Madrid	v	Real Sociedad	Madrid
				Stadium: Estadio Alfredo Di Stéfano

31 January 2027 18	Tenerife	v	Real Madrid	Santa Cruz de Tenerife
				Stadium: Estadio Heliodoro Rodríguez López

7 February 2027 19	Real Madrid	v	Athletic Club	Madrid
				Stadium: Estadio Alfredo Di Stéfano

14 February 2027 20	Atlético Madrid	v	Real Madrid	Alcalá de Henares
				Stadium: Centro Deportivo Cívitas Alcalá de Henares

21 February 2027 21	Real Madrid	v	Barcelona	Madrid
				Stadium: Estadio Alfredo Di Stéfano

14 March 2027 22	Eibar	v	Real Madrid	Eibar
				Stadium: Ipurua Municipal Stadium

21 March 2027 23	Badalona Women	v	Real Madrid	Palamós
				Stadium: Nou Municipal de Palamós

28 March 2027 24	Real Madrid	v	Sevilla	Madrid
				Stadium: Estadio Alfredo Di Stéfano

4 April 2027 25	DUX Logroño	v	Real Madrid	Logroño
				Stadium: Estadio Las Gaunas

11 April 2027 26	Real Madrid	v	Deportivo Abanca	Madrid
				Stadium: Estadio Alfredo Di Stéfano

2 May 2027 27	Madrid CFF	v	Real Madrid	Fuenlabrada
				Stadium: Estadio Fernando Torres

9 May 2027 28	Real Madrid	v	Granada	Madrid
				Stadium: Estadio Alfredo Di Stéfano

19 May 2027 29	Espanyol	v	Real Madrid	Sant Adrià de Besòs
				Stadium: Ciudad Deportiva Dani Jarque

23 May 2027 30	Real Madrid	v	Alavés	Madrid
				Stadium: Estadio Alfredo Di Stéfano

=== Copa de la Reina ===
Madrid will enter the tournament in the Round of 16, as they qualified for the Copa de la Reina.

=== UEFA Champions League ===
==== Third Qualifying Round ====
The third round draw was held on 11 August 2026.

26 August 2026 First leg	AFC Ajax (Netherlands)	0–2	(Spain) Real Madrid	Duivendrecht
19:30 CEST		Report	Schröder 42'; Levels 73'	Stadium: Sportpark De Toekomst; Referee: Maria Sole Ferrieri Caputi (Italy)

2 September 2026 Second leg	Real Madrid (Spain)	2–1 (4–1 agg.)	(Netherlands) AFC Ajax	Madrid
20:00 CEST	Schröder 58'; Caicedo 90+7'	Report	Snoeijs 48'	Stadium: Alfredo Di Stéfano; Referee: Frida Klarlund (Denmark)

==== League phase ====
Pos	Team	Pld	W	D	L	GF	GA	GD	Pts	Qualification
5	(The Football Association) Chelsea	4	2	2	0	3	0	+3	8	Advance to the knockout phase play-offs (seeded)
6	(The Football Association) Manchester City	4	1	3	0	8	5	+3	6	Advance to the knockout phase play-offs (seeded)
7	(Royal Spanish Football Federation) Real Madrid	4	1	3	0	7	4	+3	6	Advance to the knockout phase play-offs (seeded)
8	(Italian Football Federation) Juventus	4	2	0	2	8	9	−1	6	Advance to the knockout phase play-offs (seeded)
9	(Portuguese Football Federation) Benfica	4	2	0	2	5	8	−3	6	Advance to the knockout phase play-offs (unseeded)

Updated to match(es) played on 12 November 2026. Source: UEFA
Rules for classification: League phase tiebreakers

Round	1	2	3	4	5	6
Ground	H	A	A	H	H	A
Result	D	D	D	W		
Position	11	12	9	7		
Points	1	2	3	6		

Source: UEFA
A = Away; H = Home; W = Win; D = Draw; L = Loss

22 September 2026 1	Real Madrid (Spain)	1–1	(France) PSG	Madrid
21:00 CEST	Schröder 2'; Senß (yellow card) 8'; Athenea (yellow card) 90+4'	Report	Karchaoui (yellow card) 41', (goal) 74' (pen.); Samoura (yellow card) 51'	Stadium: Estadio Alfredo Di Stéfano; Attendance: 1,228; Referee: Ivana Projkovska (Macedonia)

1 October 2026 2	Manchester City (England)	1–1	(Spain) Real Madrid	Manchester
21:00 CEST	Shaw 51'	Report	Caicedo 29'	Stadium: MCFC Academy Stadium; Referee: Silvia Gasperotti (Italy)

28 October 2026 3	Bayern Munich (Germany)	2–2	(Spain) Real Madrid	Unterhaching
18:45 CET	Imade 30'; Tanikawa 52'; Eriksson (yellow card) 84'; Amani (yellow card) 85'	Report	Athenea 7'; Beerensteyn 22'; Angeldal (yellow card) 28'; Däbritz (yellow card) 90'	Stadium: Stadion Am Sportpark; Referee: Eleni Antoniou (Greece)

10 November 2026 4	Real Madrid (Spain)	3-0	(France) Paris FC	Madrid
18:45 CET	Caruso 55'; Beerensteyn 65'; Caicedo 81'	Report		Stadium: Estadio Alfredo Di Stéfano; Attendance: 962; Referee: Emily Heaslip (England)

18 November 2026 5	Real Madrid (Spain)	v	(Italy) Inter	Madrid
18:45 CET		Report		Stadium: Estadio Alfredo Di Stéfano

16 December 2026 6	Roma (Italy)	v	(Spain) Real Madrid	Rome
21:00 CET		Report		Stadium: Stadio Tre Fontane
