= Justine Rouquet =

French footballer (born 2007)

Personal information
- Date of birth: 6 June 2007 (age 19)
- Place of birth: Béziers, France
- Height: 1.77 m (5 ft 10 in)
- Positions: Winger; forward

Team information
- Current team: Montpellier
- Number: 11

Youth career
- 2014: SC Saint-Thibérien
- 2014–2017: Stade Montblanais
- 2017–2018: AS Puissalicon-Magalas
- 2018–2019: RCO Agde
- 2019–2024: Montpellier

Senior career*
Years	Team	Apps	(Gls)
2024–	Montpellier	35	(13)

International career^{‡}
2023	France U16	9	(2)
2023–2024	France U17	14	(7)
2024–2026	France U19	25	(7)
2026–	France U20	5	(4)
Medal record
Women's football
Representing France
UEFA Women's Under-19 Championship
Runner-up	2025 Poland
- * Club domestic league appearances and goals as of 21 November 2026 ‡ National team caps and goals as of 17 September 2026

Justine Rouquet (born 6 June 2007) is a French professional footballer who plays as a winger or forward for Première Ligue club Montpellier.

== Early life ==
Rouquet was born on 6 June 2007 in Béziers, France.

== Club career ==
As a youth player, Rouquet joined the youth academy of Montpellier. Ahead of the 2024–25 season, she was promoted to the club's senior team.

== International career ==
Rouquet has represented France at various youth levels. During the summer of 2025, she played for the France under-19 team at the 2025 UEFA Women's Under-19 Championship.

In May 2026, Rouquet received her first call-up to the France national team.

== Style of play ==
Rouquet plays as a winger or forward. English newspaper The Guardian wrote in 2026 that she "dribbles well, plays cutting balls into the center of the penalty area, and creates shooting opportunities from thin air".

== Honours ==
France U19

- UEFA Women's Under-19 Championship runner-up: 2025

Individual

- UNFP Première Ligue young player of the year: 2025–26
- LFFP Première Ligue best young player: 2025–26
