= Sandrine Ringler =

French footballer (born 1973)

Personal information
- Full name: Sandrine Carole Ringler
- Date of birth: 10 September 1973 (age 53)
- Place of birth: Sélestat, France
- Position: Defender

Senior career*
Years	Team	Apps	(Gls)
1979-1985	US Heidolsheim		
1996–1998	FC Vendenheim		

International career
1988–1997	France	19	(0)
- * Club domestic league appearances and goals

Sandrine Carole Ringler (born 10 September 1973) is a French former footballer who played as a defender for FC Vendenheim of the Division 1 Féminine.

== International career ==
Sandrine Ringler represented France 19 times. Ringler was also part of the French team at the 1997 European Championships.

== Coaching career ==
Since retiring from professional football Ringler has become the coach of the France women's national under-19 football team.
