= Eunate Astralaga =

Spanish footballer (born 2005)

- Astralaga with Spain in 2026

Personal information
- Full name: Eunate Astralaga Aranguren
- Date of birth: 30 November 2005 (age 20)
- Place of birth: Berango, Spain
- Height: 1.86 m (6 ft 1 in)
- Position: Goalkeeper

Team information
- Current team: Athletic Bilbao

Youth career
- 2013–2017: Bizkerre
- 2017–2020: Athletic Bilbao

Senior career*
Years	Team	Apps	(Gls)
2020–2021	Athletic Bilbao C	13	(0)
2021–2024	Athletic Bilbao B	52	(0)
2024–	Athletic Bilbao	0	(0)
2024–2026	→ SD Eibar (loan)	44	(0)

International career^{‡}
2021–2022	Spain U17	3	(0)
2023–2024	Spain U19	8	(0)
2024	Spain U20	4	(0)
Medal record
Women's football
Representing Spain
FIFA U-17 Women's World Cup
Winner	2022 India
UEFA Women's Under-17 Championship
Runner-up	2022 Bosnia and Herzegovina
UEFA Women's Under-19 Championship
Winner	2024 Lithuania
- * Club domestic league appearances and goals as of 25 July 2025 ‡ National team caps and goals as of 13 May 2025

Eunate Astralaga Aranguren (born 30 November 2005) is a Spanish footballer who plays as a goalkeeper for Athletic Bilbao.

== Club career ==
Born in Berango (Biscay province, Basque Country), Astralaga started her career at Bizkerre FT in Getxo. She joined Athletic Bilbao in 2017 aged 11, working her way through the youth ranks culminating in a place with the B-team.

With high expectations for her future but behind international goalkeepers Adriana Nanclares and Mariasun Quiñones in the selection list at Athletic, in 2024 Astralaga agreed a contract extension running until 2027 but moved on loan to SD Eibar, where she initially alternated with María Miralles for the starting role.

== International career ==
Astralaga has featured for Spain at various youth levels, being a member of the squads which finished runners-up at the 2022 UEFA Women's Under-17 Championship then won the 2022 FIFA U-17 Women's World Cup. She subsequently moved up to the under 19s and won the 2024 UEFA Women's Under-19 Championship, also featuring at the 2024 FIFA U-20 Women's World Cup.

After showing strong form for Eibar, she received a first call-up for the senior Spain squad aged 19 in March 2025.

== Personal life ==
Her older brother Ander (born 2004) is also a footballer and goalkeeper who was playing for FC Barcelona Atlètic in 2025.

== Honours ==
Spain U17

- FIFA Under-17 Women's World Cup: 2022
- UEFA Women's Under-17 Championship runner-up: 2022

Spain U19

- UEFA Women's Under-19 Championship: 2024

Individual

- UEFA Women's Under-19 Championship Team of the Tournament: 2024
