= Dave Connell =

Irish footballer (born 1961)

Personal information
- Date of birth: 27 November 1961 (age 64)
- Place of birth: Dublin, Ireland
- Position: Right-back

Senior career*
| Years | Team | Apps | (Gls) |
| 1979–1985 | Bohemians | 103 | (1) |
| 1985–1988 | Dundalk | 29 | (1) |
| 1989–1992 | Shamrock Rovers | 95 | (5) |
| 1992–1993 | Ards | 22 | (1) |
| 1993–1994 | Drogheda United | 25 | (1) |
| 1994–1999 | Limerick | 79 | (0) |

Managerial career
- 1997–1998: Limerick
- 2001: Galway United
- 2011–: Republic of Ireland women's U17
- 2011–: Republic of Ireland women's U19
- * Club domestic league appearances and goals

Dave Connell (born 27 November 1961) was an Irish soccer player during the 1970s and 1980s. He is currently the head coach of the U19 Republic of Ireland women's national football team and works as a Football In Community Development Officer for the Football Association of Ireland.

== Sources ==
- Paul Doolan; Robert Goggins. The Hoops. ISBN 0-7171-2121-6.
