= 2024 UEFA Women's Under-19 Championship =

2024 m. Europos moterų U-19 futbolo čempionatas

Tournament details
- Host country: Lithuania
- Dates: 14–27 July 2024
- Teams: 8 (from 1 confederation)
- Venues: 3 (in 3 host cities)

Final positions
- Champions: Spain (6th title)
- Runners-up: Netherlands

Tournament statistics
- Matches played: 15
- Goals scored: 47 (3.13 per match)
- Top scorer(s): (Serbia) Nina Matejić (5 goals)
- Best player: (Spain) Daniela Agote

The 2024 UEFA Women's Under-19 Championship was the 21st edition (25th in U18 and U19) of the UEFA Women's Under-19 Championship, the annual international youth football championship organised by UEFA for the women's under-19 national teams of Europe. Lithuania hosted the tournament.

A total of eight teams played in the tournament, with players born on or after 1 January 2005 eligible to participate.

Spain were the two-time defending champions, and successfully defended the title after beating the Netherlands in the final.

== Venues ==
Lithuania
Jonava	Kaunas	Marijampolė
Central Stadium of Jonava	Darius and Girėnas Stadium	Sūduva Stadium
Capacity: 2,580	Capacity: 15,026	Capacity: 6,523
2024 UEFA Women's Under-19 Championship is located in Lithuania

== Qualification ==
52 (out of 55) UEFA nations entered the qualifying competition, with the hosts Lithuania also competing despite already qualifying automatically, and seven teams would qualify for the final tournament at the end of round 2 to join the hosts.

=== Qualified teams ===
The following teams qualified for the final tournament.

Team	Method of qualification	Appearance	Last appearance	Previous best performance
Lithuania	Hosts	1st	Debut	
Spain	Round 2 Group A1 winners	17th	2023 (Champions)	Champions (2004, 2017, 2018, 2022, 2023)
Republic of Ireland	Round 2 Group A2 winners	2nd	2014 (Semi-finals)	Semi-finals (2014)
England	Round 2 Group A3 winners	15th	2022 (Group stage)	Champions (2009)
France	Round 2 Group A4 winners	18th	2023 (Semi-finals)	Champions (2003, 2010, 2013, 2016, 2019)
Serbia	Round 2 Group A5 winners	2nd	2012 (Group stage)	Group stage (2012)
Netherlands	Round 2 Group A6 winners	11th	2023 (Semi-finals)	Champions (2014)
Germany	Round 2 Group A7 winners	19th	2023 (Runners-up)	Champions (2000, 2001, 2002, 2006, 2007, 2011)

== Group stage ==
The group winners and runners-up advanced to the semi-finals.

Tiebreakers

In the group stage, teams were ranked according to points (3 points for a win, 1 point for a draw, 0 points for a loss), and if tied on points, the following tiebreaking criteria were applied, in the order given, to determine the rankings (Regulations Articles 20.01 and 20.02):

1. Points in head-to-head matches among tied teams;
2. Goal difference in head-to-head matches among tied teams;
3. Goals scored in head-to-head matches among tied teams;
4. If more than two teams were tied, and after applying all head-to-head criteria above, a subset of teams were still tied, all head-to-head criteria above were reapplied exclusively to that subset of teams;
5. Goal difference in all group matches;
6. Goals scored in all group matches;
7. Penalty shoot-out if only two teams had the same number of points, and they met in the last round of the group and were tied after applying all criteria above (not used if more than two teams had the same number of points, or if their rankings were not relevant for qualification for the next stage);
8. Disciplinary points (red card = 3 points, yellow card = 1 point, expulsion for two yellow cards in one match = 3 points);
9. Higher position in the qualification round 2 league ranking

=== Group A ===
Pos	Team	Pld	W	D	L	GF	GA	GD	Pts	Qualification
1	England	3	2	1	0	12	1	+11	7	Knockout stage
2	France	3	2	0	1	9	2	+7	6	Knockout stage
3	Serbia	3	1	1	1	6	5	+1	4	
4	Lithuania (H)	3	0	0	3	1	20	−19	0	

Source: UEFA
Rules for classification: Group stage tiebreakers
(H) Hosts
14 July 2024
13:00

France	3–1	Serbia
Robillard 66'; Rossi 83'; Sangare 90+2'	Report	Matejić 34' (pen.)

Central Stadium of Jonava, Jonava
Referee: Olivia Tschon (Austria)
14 July 2024
16:00

Lithuania	0–10	England
	Report	Pritchard 5', 39', 46'; Watson 12'; Agyemang 14', 24', 55'; Lia 57'; Potter 68'; Earl 90+3'

Darius and Girėnas Stadium, Kaunas
Referee: Emanuela Rusta (Albania)

17 July 2024
13:00

Serbia	1–1	England
Matejić 68'	Report	Enderby 90' (pen.)

Sūduva Stadium, Marijampolė
Referee: Minka Vekkeli (Finland)
17 July 2024
17:00

Lithuania	0–6	France
	Report	Robillard 19', 30', 40'; Coutel 45'; Lushimba Bilombi 64'; Ben Khaled 90' (pen.)

Darius and Girėnas Stadium, Kaunas
Referee: Réka Molnár (Hungary)

20 July 2024
17:00

Serbia	4–1	Lithuania
Matejić 4', 33', 90+7'; Babić 90+4'	Report	Jasaitytė 14'

Darius and Girėnas Stadium, Kaunas
Referee: Anastasia Mylopoulou (Greece)
20 July 2024
17:00

England	1–0	France
Pritchard 78'	Report

Central Stadium of Jonava, Jonava
Referee: Caroline Lanssens (Belgium)

=== Group B ===
Pos	Team	Pld	W	D	L	GF	GA	GD	Pts	Qualification
1	Netherlands	3	2	1	0	4	1	+3	7	Knockout stage
2	Spain	3	1	1	1	2	1	+1	4 (Note: Head-to-head result: Germany 0-2 Spain)	Knockout stage
3	Germany	3	1	1	1	3	4	−1	4	
4	Republic of Ireland	3	0	1	2	1	4	−3	1	

Source: UEFA
Rules for classification: Group stage tiebreakers
Notes:
15 July 2024
13:00

Spain	0–0	Republic of Ireland
	Report

Sūduva Stadium, Marijampolė
Referee: Michalina Diakow (Poland)
15 July 2024
17:00

Netherlands	1–1	Germany
Huizenga 90'	Report	Krüger 75'

Central Stadium of Jonava, Jonava
Referee: Silvia Gasperotti (Italy)

18 July 2024
13:00

Republic of Ireland	1–2	Germany
O'Leary 32'	Report	Schetter 71'; Portella 77'

Central Stadium of Jonava, Jonava
Referee: Anastasia Mylopoulou (Greece)
18 July 2024
17:00

Netherlands	1–0	Spain
Keukelaar 87'	Report

Sūduva Stadium, Marijampolė
Referee: Caroline Lanssens (Belgium)

21 July 2024
13:00

Republic of Ireland	0–2	Netherlands
	Report	Woons 18'; Van Koppen 61'

Sūduva Stadium, Marijampolė
Referee: Olivia Tschon (Austria)
21 July 2024
13:00

Germany	0–2	Spain
	Report	Bejarano 14'; Comendador 86'

Central Stadium of Jonava, Jonava
Referee: Réka Molnár (Hungary)

== Knockout stage ==
In the knockout stage, extra time and penalty shoot-out were used to decide the winner if necessary.

=== Bracket ===
Semi-finals
24 July – Marijampolė
England	1
Spain	3
24 July – Kaunas
Netherlands	2
France	0

Final
27 July – Kaunas
Spain (a.e.t.)	2
Netherlands	1

=== Semi-finals ===
24 July 2024
13:00

England	1–3	Spain
Enderby 47'	Report	Agote 25'; Comendador 45'; Arques 69'

Sūduva Stadium, Marijampolė
Referee: Michalina Diakow (Poland)

24 July 2024
17:00

Netherlands	2–0	France
Woons 19'; Tolhoek 42'	Report

Darius and Girėnas Stadium, Kaunas
Referee: Emanuela Rusta (Albania)

=== Final ===
27 July 2024
17:00

Spain	2–1 (a.e.t.)	Netherlands
Marísa 6'; Eguiguren 118'	Report	Tolhoek 59'

Darius and Girėnas Stadium, Kaunas
Referee: Silvia Gasperotti (Italy)

== Goalscorers ==
There were 47 goals scored in 15 matches, for an average of 3.13 goals per match.

5 goals

- (Serbia) Nina Matejić

4 goals

- (England) Poppy Pritchard
- (France) Camille Robillard

3 goals

- (England) Michelle Agyemang

2 goals

- (Spain) Paula Comendador
- (England) Mia Enderby
- (Netherlands) Danique Tolhoek
- (Netherlands) Karlijn Woons

1 goal

- (England) Madison Earl
- (England) Vivienne Lia
- (England) Lexi Potter
- (England) Katy Watson
- (France) Nermyne Ben Khaled
- (France) Charline Coutel
- (France) Landryna Lushimba Bilombi
- (France) Fanny Rossi
- (France) Wassa Sangare
- (Germany) Melina Krüger
- (Germany) Laila Portella
- (Germany) Leonie Schetter
- (Republic of Ireland) Lia O'Leary
- (Lithuania) Karolina Jasaityte
- (Netherlands) Hanna Huizenga
- (Netherlands) Lotte Keukelaar
- (Netherlands) Mirte Van Koppen
- (Serbia) Milica Babić
- (Spain) Daniela Agote
- (Spain) Daniela Arques
- (Spain) Noemí Bejarano
- (Spain) Intza Eguiguren
- (Spain) Marísa García

== Awards ==
The following awards were given after the tournament:

- Player of the Tournament: (Spain) Daniela Agote
- Top Scorer: (Serbia) Nina Matejić (5 goals)

=== Team of the Tournament ===
After the tournament, the Under-19 Team of the Tournament was selected by the UEFA Technical Observer panel.

Position	Player
Goalkeeper	(Spain) Eunate Astralaga
Defenders	(Spain) Noemí Bejarano
Defenders	(Spain) Aïcha Camara
Defenders	(Netherlands) Karlijn Woons
Defenders	(England) Cerys Brown
Midfielders	(Spain) Ainhoa Alguacil
Midfielders	(Netherlands) Jade van Hensbergen
Midfielders	(France) Landryna Lushimba Bilombi
Forwards	(Spain) Daniela Agote
Forwards	(Serbia) Nina Matejić
Forwards	(Netherlands) Lotte Keukelaar
