= Daniela Agote =

Spanish footballer (born 2006)

Personal information
- Full name: Daniela Agote Aguirre
- Date of birth: 27 August 2006 (age 20)
- Place of birth: Castro Urdiales, Spain (de jure); Barakaldo, Spain (de facto)
- Position: Forward

Team information
- Current team: Athletic Bilbao
- Number: 17

Youth career
- 2018–2022: Athletic Bilbao

Senior career*
Years	Team	Apps	(Gls)
2021–2023	Athletic Bilbao C	46	(11)
2023–2024	Athletic Bilbao B	37	(5)
2024–	Athletic Bilbao	46	(9)

International career^{‡}
2023–	Spain U19	25	(14)
Medal record
Women's football
Representing Spain
FIFA U-20 Women's World Cup
Winner	2026 Poland
UEFA Women's Under-19 Championship
Winner	2024 Lithuania
Winner	2025 Poland
- * Club domestic league appearances and goals as of 25 July 2026 ‡ National team caps and goals as of 25 August 2026

Daniela Agote Aguirre (born 27 August 2006) is a Spanish professional footballer who plays as a forward for Liga F club Athletic Bilbao.

== Club career ==
A native of Castro Urdiales (Cantabria), her legal birthplace and where she was raised, with her birth taking place in Barakaldo (Biscay), Agote joined Athletic Bilbao in 2018, initially playing with the 'cadete' youth teams. She moved up to the C-team in the 2022–23 season, scoring 11 goals in 46 games, and had appeared for the B-team by the end of the same season; she went on to play 37 matches with five goals. Agote joined Athletic Bilbao in 2018, initially playing with the 'cadete' youth teams.

She made her debut for the senior team in November 2024, as a substitute in a 1–0 defeat to Real Sociedad at Anoeta Stadium. Two weeks later she scored her first goal in Liga F, the only player to find the net in a victory over Levante Badalona at Lezama.

== International career ==
=== Spain U19 ===
Agote was part of the Spain squad at the 2024 UEFA Women's Under-19 Championship where the team won the championship and she was named the tournament's best player. She was still young enough to compete at the subsequent 2025 UEFA Women's Under-19 Championship, where she scored in the final as Spain retained their title.

== Honours ==
Spain U19

- UEFA Women's Under-19 Championship: 2024, 2025

Spain U20

- FIFA U-20 Women's World Cup: 2026

Individual

- UEFA Women's Under-19 Championship Player of the Tournament: 2024
- UEFA Women's Under-19 Championship Team of the Tournament: 2024, 2025
