= Noemí Bejarano =

Spanish footballer (born 2006)

Personal information
- Full name: Noemí Bejarano Beltrán
- Date of birth: 27 June 2006 (age 20)
- Place of birth: Rota, Spain
- Position: Full-back

Team information
- Current team: Real Madrid
- Number: 2

Youth career
- 2009–2021: UD Roteña
- 2021–2023: Real Betis

Senior career*
Years	Team	Apps	(Gls)
2022–2023	Real Betis B	21	(2)
2023–2026	Real Madrid B	69	(6)
2025–	Real Madrid	10	(0)

International career^{‡}
2023–2023	Spain U17	12	(0)
2023–2025	Spain U19	25	(3)
2026–	Spain U20	9	(0)
Medal record
Women's football
Representing Spain
FIFA U-20 Women's World Cup
Winner	2026 Poland
UEFA Women's Under-19 Championship
Winner	2024 Lithuania
Winner	2025 Poland
UEFA Women's Under-17 Championship
Runner-up	2023 Estonia
- * Club domestic league appearances and goals as of 09:04, 02 November 2026 (UTC) ‡ National team caps and goals as of 00:27, 28 October 2026 (UTC)

Noemí Bejarano Beltrán (born 27 June 2006) is a Spanish professional footballer who plays as a full-back for Liga F club Real Madrid.

== Club career ==
Bejarano began her career in the youth categories of UD Roteña before moving to Real Betis in 2021, where she played for two years. She signed for Real Madrid B in 2023.

=== Real Madrid ===
In 2023, Bejarano joined Real Madrid B ahead of the start of the 2023–2024 season. She played her first match on 10 September, starting in the season opener against Rayo Vallecano which ended in a 2–0 win for Real Madrid. That season, Bejarano made two appearances for the Real Madrid Juvenil team and helped win Torneo Juvenil Femenino 2024. She was also part of the Real Madrid B squad that won the Segunda Federación and achieved promotion.

Bejarano made her first team debut on May 18, 2025 in the last game of the 2024-2025 season against Valencia, when Alberto Toril brought her on as a substitute for Olga Carmona in the 82nd minute. On October 8, 2025, Bejarano made her UEFA Women's Champions League debut, coming on as a substitute for Eva Navarro in a 6–2 win against Roma.

On 28 July 2026, Bejarano was officially promoted to the first team.

== International career ==
Bejarano has played for the Spain's U-17, U-19, and U-20 teams.

In 2023, she played in the 2023 UEFA Women's Under-17 Championship. She helped her team reach the final and was included in the Team of the Tournament thanks to her performances.

The next year, she played in the 2024 UEFA Women's Under-19 Championship, where Spain won for the third consecutive time. Bejarano scored Spain's first goal of the finals in a match that ended in a 2-0 win against Germany, which helped them qualify for the semi-finals. Thanks to her contributions to the Spanish team, particularly her activeness and her involvement in the attacks through the right channel, Bejarano was included in the Team of the Tournament alongside four of her teammates..

In 2025, she was selected as part of the squad for the 2025 UEFA Women's Under-19 Championship. Spain again went on to win the title with Bejarano scoring the last goal of the tournament. For her role, she was again included in the Team of the Tournament, this time highlighting not only her effective defensive work but also her good decisions and contribution to the team's attacking play.

Bejarano was part of the U-20 team that won the 2026 FIFA U-20 Women's World Cup.

== Career statistics ==
As of 15 November 2026

Appearances and goals by club, season and competition
Club	Season	League			Copa de la Reina		Continental		Other		Total	
Club	Season	Division	Apps	Goals	Apps	Goals	Apps	Goals	Apps	Goals	Apps	Goals
Real Betis B	2021–22	Segunda División	3	0	—		—		—		3	0
Real Betis B	2022–23	Segunda Federación	18	2	—		—		—		18	2
Real Betis B	Total		21	2	—		—		—		21	2
Real Madrid B	2023–24	Segunda Federación	25	1	—		—		2	0	25	1
Real Madrid B	2024–25	Primera Federación	21	2	—		—		—		21	2
Real Madrid B	2025–26	Primera Federación	20	3	—		—		—		20	3
Real Madrid B	Total		66	6	—		—		2	0	68	6
Real Madrid	2024–25	Liga F	1	0	0	0	0	0	0	0	1	0
Real Madrid	2025–26	Liga F	5	0	0	0	1 (Note: Appearance in UEFA Women's Champions League)	0	0	0	6	0
Real Madrid	2026–27	Liga F	3	0	0	0	2	0	0	0	4	0
Real Madrid	Total		9	0	0	0	3	0	0	0	11	0
Career total			96	8	0	0	3	0	2	0	101	8

== Honours ==
Real Madrid Juvenil

- Torneo Juvenil Femenino: 2024

Real Madrid B

- Segunda Federación: 2023–24

Spain U17

- UEFA Women's Under-17 Championship runner–up: 2023

Spain U19

- UEFA Women's Under-19 Championship: 2024 , 2025

Spain U20

- FIFA U-20 Women's World Cup: 2026

Individual

- UEFA Women's Under-17 Championship Team of the Tournament: 2023
- UEFA Women's Under-19 Championship Team of the Tournament: 2024, 2025
