= Julia Tunturi =

Finnish footballer (born 1996)

Personal information
- Full name: Julia Emma Maria Tunturi
- Date of birth: 25 April 1996 (age 30)
- Place of birth: Helsinki, Finland
- Height: 1.65 m (5 ft 5 in)
- Position: Midfielder

Team information
- Current team: Vittsjö GIK
- Number: 3

Youth career
- Pargas IF

Senior career*
Years	Team	Apps	(Gls)
2012–2014	TPS	63	(14)
2015–2016	Åland United	31	(5)
2017	TPS	16	(5)
2018–2020	Eskilstuna United	60	(9)
2021–2023	Vittsjö GIK	25	(0)
2023–2024	Brøndby IF	7	(0)
2024–	Vittsjö GIK	23	(1)

International career^{‡}
2011	Finland U17	3	(0)
2013–2015	Finland U19	15	(4)
2014	Finland U20	3	(0)
2015–	Finland	25	(0)
- * Club domestic league appearances and goals as of 15:40, 14 October 2024 (UTC) ‡ National team caps and goals as of 3 June 2020

Julia Emma Maria Tunturi (born 25 April 1996) is a Finnish footballer who plays as a midfielder for Vittsjö GIK and the Finland national team.

She previously played for TPS and Åland United of the Naisten Liiga.

== Club career ==
Tunturi made her league debut against FC Honka on 21 April 2012. She scored her first league goal against Pallokissat on 20 May 2012, scoring in the 77th minute. Tunturi briefly trained with Umeå IK in December 2013.

On 24 November 2014, Tunturi was announced at Åland United.

On 17 November 2016, Tunturi was announced at TPS.

In November 2017 Tunturi agreed a transfer from TPS to Eskilstuna United DFF of the Swedish Damallsvenskan. Calling the move "a step up" in her career, she described herself as a left-footed player who prefers a central midfield role. She signed a two-year, full-time professional contract with Eskilstuna United.

On 13 January 2023, Tunturi was announced at Brøndby IF on a contract that runs until Winter 2024.

On 15 February 2024, Tunturi was announced at Vittsjö GIK.

== International career ==
On 10 April 2012, Tunturi was called up to the Finland U17s for European qualifying matches.

On 19 August 2013, Tunturi started the match against Sweden U19s.

She was named in the 2013 UEFA Women's Under-19 Championship Team of the Tournament, after Finland reached the semi-finals. She was also a member of the Finland squad at the 2014 FIFA U-20 Women's World Cup in Canada.

Tunturi was called up to the Finland national team for the first time in January 2014.

Tunturi made her debut for the Finland women's national team on 6 March 2015, in a 0–0 draw with the Netherlands at the 2015 Cyprus Cup.

Tunturi was called up to the 2018 Cyprus Women's Cup squad.

Tunturi was called up to the 2019 Cyprus Women's Cup squad.

Tunturi was called up to the 2020 Cyprus Women's Cup squad.

== Personal life ==
On 23 May 2013, Tunturi was awarded a national Kesko scholarship.
