= Juliette Kemppi =

Finnish footballer (born 1994)

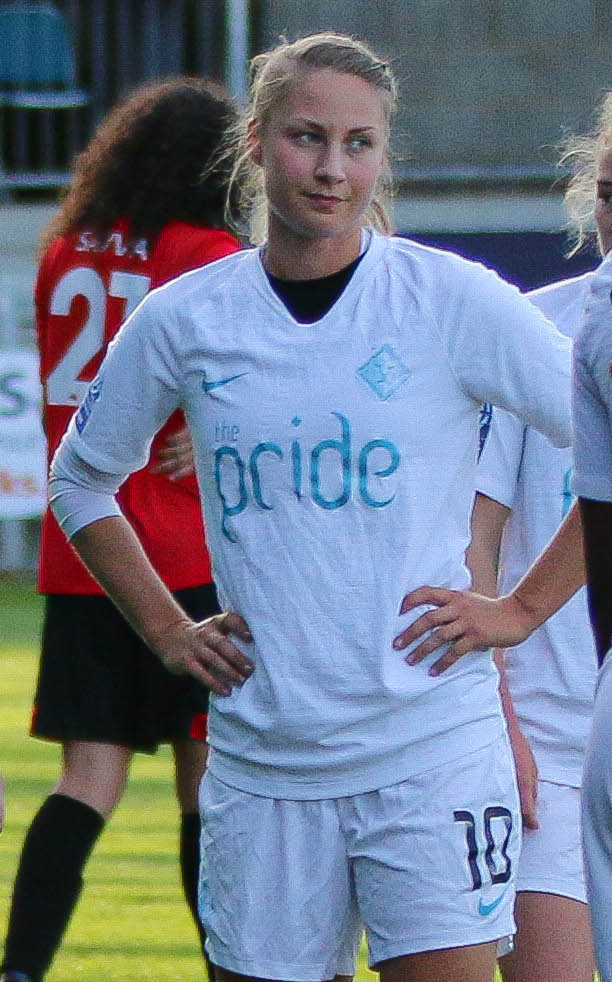
- Juliette Kemppi in October 2019

Personal information
- Full name: Juliette Mikaela Kemppi
- Date of birth: 14 May 1994 (age 32)
- Place of birth: Kaarina, Finland
- Height: 1.69 m (5 ft 7 in)
- Position: Forward

Team information
- Current team: Växjö DFF

Youth career
- –2009: KaaPo, Pyrkivä Turku

Senior career*
Years	Team	Apps	(Gls)
2010–2012	TPS Turku	61	(4)
2013–2014	Åland United	46	(26)
2015	AIK	17	(1)
2016–2017	Kolbotn	44	(11)
2018	LSK Kvinner	10	(0)
2018–2019	Bristol City	14	(1)
2019–2021	London City Lionesses	32	(0)
2021	Växjö DFF	10	(1)
2022	IFK Kalmar	24	(7)
2023	Växjö DFF	25	(2)

International career^{‡}
2010–2011	Finland U17		
2012–2013	Finland U19		
2014	Finland U20		
2013–	Finland	59	(5)
- * Club domestic league appearances and goals as of 01:41, 25 September 2024 (UTC) ‡ National team caps and goals as of 10 February 2022

Juliette Mikaela Kemppi (born 14 May 1994) is a Finnish professional footballer who plays as a forward.

She previously played for FA WSL team, Bristol City, LSK Kvinner FK in the Norwegian Toppserien, AIK in the Swedish Damallsvenskan, as well as TPS Turku and Åland United of the Finnish Naisten Liiga.

== Club career ==
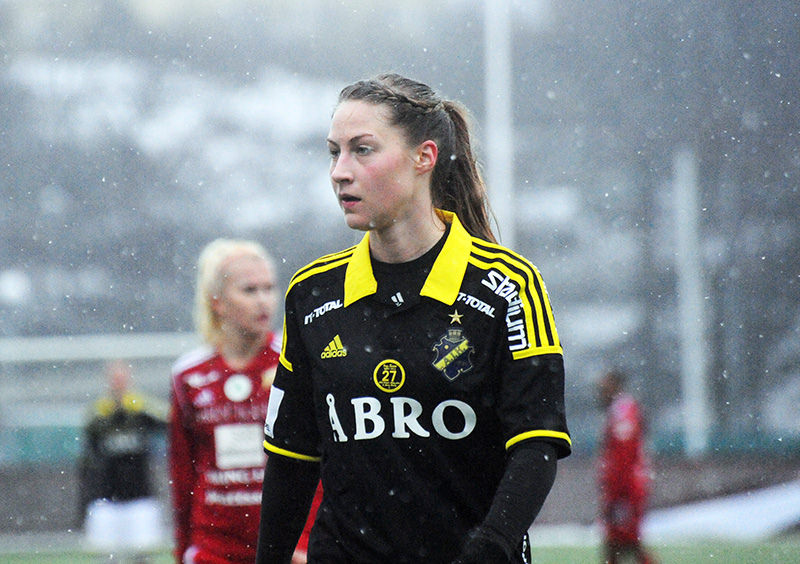
Kemppi in January 2015

=== Kolbotn ===
After leaving relegated AIK, Kemppi joined Kolbotn Fotball in December 2015.

=== LSK Kvinner ===
On 18 January 2018, Kemppi was announced at LSK Kvinner.

=== Bristol City ===
On 18 August 2018, Kemppi signed with Bristol City in the FA Women's Super League.

=== London City Lionesses ===
On 30 June 2020, it was announced that Kemppi would be staying with the club for the 2020/21 season. On May 28, 2021, it was announced that Kemppi would be leaving the club.

=== First spell at Växjö DFF ===
Kemppi was part of the 2021 Växjö side that was relegated from the Damallsvenskan.

=== IFK Kalmar ===
On 5 December 2021, Kemppi was announced at IFK Kalmar.

=== Second spell at Växjö DFF ===
On 13 December 2022, Kemppi was announced at Växjö DFF. On 1 December 2023, it was announced that Växjö would not be renewing her contract for the next season.

== International career ==
Kemppi made her debut for the Finland women's national team in September 2013 against Kazakhstan. She was also a member of the Finnish squad at the 2014 FIFA U-20 Women's World Cup in Canada and played at the 2013 UEFA Women's Under-19 Championship.

Kemppi has previously played floorball and was a member of Finland's U-19 World Championship winning squad in 2012.

Kemppi was called up to the 2019 Cyprus Women's Cup squad.

Kemppi was called up to the 2020 Cyprus Women's Cup squad.

Kemppi was called up to the UEFA Women's Euro 2022 squad.

== International goals ==
No.	Date	Venue	Opponent	Score	Result	Competition
1.	10 April 2014	Sonera Stadium, Helsinki, Finland	Hungary	2–0	4–0	2015 FIFA Women's World Cup qualification
2.	17 September 2014	Stade de l'Épopée, Calais, France	France	1–0	1–3	2015 FIFA Women's World Cup qualification
3.	11 March 2015	GSP Stadium, Nicosia, Cyprus	South Africa	1–0	2–1	2015 Cyprus Women's Cup
4.	27 February 2019	GSZ Stadium, Larnaca, Cyprus	South Africa	1–0	2–2	2019 Cyprus Women's Cup
5.	23 February 2021	AEK Arena – Georgios Karapatakis, Larnaca, Cyprus	Cyprus	5–0	5–0	UEFA Women's Euro 2022 qualifying

== Personal life ==
Kemppi's nickname is Juke.
