= Sini Laaksonen =

Finnish footballer (born 1996)

Personal information
- Full name: Sini Emilia Laaksonen
- Date of birth: 5 March 1996 (age 30)
- Place of birth: Masku, Finland
- Height: 5 ft 11 in (1.80 m)
- Position: Midfielder

Team information
- Current team: Ankara BB Fomget
- Number: 8

College career
Years	Team	Apps	(Gls)
2016	Nova Southeastern Sharks	18	(3)
2017–2019	UMass Minutewomen	54	(6)

Senior career*
Years	Team	Apps	(Gls)
2013–2017	TPS	89	(10)
2018	Honka	0	(0)
2019	TPS	11	(1)
2020	Ferencváros	2	(2)
2020–2021	Santa Teresa	10	(0)
2022–2023	Länk Vilaverdense	28	(2)
2023–2024	Racing Power	28	(3)
2024–	Ankara BB Fomget	19	(3)

International career
2014	Finland U20	2	(1)
- * Club domestic league appearances and goals as of 4 May 2025

Sini Emilia Laaksonen (born 5 March 1996) is a Finnish women's football midfielder who plays in the Turkish Super League for Ankara BB Fomget.

== Early life ==
Laaksonen was born in 1996 in Turku, Finland. She was seen as a Finnish football prospect from a young age.

== College career ==
Laaksonen enrolled in Nova Southeastern University in the United States, where she experienced Hurricane Matthew. She majored in biology. Altogether, she made fifty-four appearances and scored five goals and recorded seven assists for their women's soccer team.

After graduating from college, she had the opportunity to transfer to a Spanish side, but the transfer never happened. She instead returned to the Finnish side TPS.

== Club career ==
Laaksonen started her career with Finnish side TPS, quickly establishing herself in the team. In 2020, she signed for Hungarian side Ferencváros after making one hundred league appearances and scoring eleven goals for TPS.

After that, she signed for Spanish side Santa Teresa. In 2022, she signed for Portuguese side Länk Vilaverdense. On 14 August 2023, Laaksonen was announced at Racing Power.

In September 2024, she moved to Turkey, and signed a deal with Ankara BB Fomget to play in the 2024–25 Super League. In that season, she won the champions title.

== International career ==
Laaksonen represented Finland internationally at youth level at the U-19 European Championship. She also represented Finland internationally at the 2014 FIFA U-20 Women's World Cup.

== Style of play ==
Laaksonen mainly operates as a midfielder and is known for her vision and passing ability. She is also known for her tackling ability.

== Honours ==
Ankara BB Fomget

- Turkish Women's Football Super League: 2024–25
