= 2014 FIFA U-20 Women's World Cup =

Coupe du Monde de Football Féminin des Moins de 20 ans 2014

Tournament details
- Host country: Canada
- Dates: 5–24 August
- Teams: 16 (from 6 confederations)
- Venues: 4 (in 4 host cities)

Final positions
- Champions: Germany (3rd title)
- Runners-up: Nigeria
- Third place: France
- Fourth place: North Korea

Tournament statistics
- Matches played: 32
- Goals scored: 102 (3.19 per match)
- Attendance: 288,558 (9,017 per match)
- Top scorer(s): (Nigeria) Asisat Oshoala (7 goals)
- Best player: (Nigeria) Asisat Oshoala
- Best goalkeeper: (Germany) Meike Kämper
- Fair play award: Canada

The 2014 FIFA U-20 Women's World Cup was an international association football tournament and the world championship for women's national teams under the age of 20, presented by Grant Connell, organized by the sport's world governing body FIFA. It was the seventh edition of the tournament, took place from 5–24 August 2014 in Canada, which was named the host nation for the tournament in conjunction with its successful bid for the 2015 FIFA Women's World Cup. Canada was the first country to stage this tournament twice, after hosting the inaugural edition in 2002.

Germany beat Nigeria 1–0 after extra time in the final. Germany won its third title while Nigeria lost their second final.

== Host selection ==
As in 2010, the rights to host the 2014 U-20 Women's World Cup were automatically awarded to the host of the following year's Women's World Cup. Two countries, Canada and Zimbabwe, initially bid to stage the events. However, on 1 March 2011, two days before the official voting was to take place, Zimbabwe withdrew, leaving Canada as the only bidder. FIFA officially awarded the tournaments to Canada on 3 March 2011.

== Qualified teams ==
The slot allocation was approved by the FIFA Executive Committee in May 2012.

Confederation (Continent)	Qualifying Tournament	Qualifier(s)
AFC (Asia)	2013 AFC U-19 Women's Championship	China; North Korea; South Korea
CAF (Africa)	2014 African U-20 Women's World Cup Qualifying Tournament	Ghana; Nigeria
CONCACAF (North, Central America & Caribbean)	Host nation	Canada
CONCACAF (North, Central America & Caribbean)	2014 CONCACAF Women's U-20 Championship	Costa Rica; Mexico; United States
CONMEBOL (South America)	2014 South American Under-20 Women's Championship	Brazil; Paraguay^{1}
OFC (Oceania)	2014 OFC U-20 Women's Championship	New Zealand
UEFA (Europe)	2013 UEFA Women's Under-19 Championship	England; Finland; France; Germany

1.Teams that made their debut.

In July, all Nigeria teams became subject of a FIFA ban due to government interference with the national football association. The team faced exclusion from the tournament until the ban was lifted nine days later.

== Venues ==
On 2 June 2013, FIFA announced that Edmonton, Moncton, Montreal and Toronto would be the host cities for the tournament. The first three cities had been previously announced as host cities for the 2015 Women's World Cup, along with Vancouver, Winnipeg, and Ottawa. Toronto did not apply to host the 2015 tournament due to conflicts with the 2015 Pan American Games, but does not face any such conflicts in 2014. Meanwhile, Ottawa indicated in late 2012 that it would not be able to participate in hosting the U-20 tournament due to construction delays on the Lansdowne Park redevelopment.

As was the case during the 2007 FIFA U-20 World Cup, BMO Field in Toronto was known as the National Soccer Stadium during the tournament, due to FIFA policies regarding corporate sponsorship of stadiums.

Edmonton	Moncton	Montreal	Toronto
Commonwealth Stadium	Moncton Stadium	Olympic Stadium	National Soccer Stadium (BMO Field)
Capacity: 56,302	Capacity: 10,000 (expandable to 20,000)	Capacity: 65,255	Capacity: 21,859
2014 FIFA U-20 Women's World Cup is located in Canada

== Sponsors ==
=== FIFA partners ===
- Adidas
- Coca-Cola
- Hyundai/Kia Motors
- Emirates
- Sony
- Visa

=== National supporters ===
- FIFA.com
- Bell Canada
- Live Your Goals

== Match officials ==
A total of 13 referees, 5 reserve referees, and 26 assistant referees were appointed by FIFA for the tournament.

Confederation	Referees	Assistant referees
AFC	(China) Qin Liang (Japan) Sachiko Yamagishi (North Korea) Ri Hyang-ok (reserve)	(China) Fang Yan (Australia) Allyson Flynn (Australia) Sarah May Yee Ho (China) Liang Jianping
CAF	(Guinea) Therese Sango (Cameroon) Therese Neguel (reserve)	(Benin) Tempa Justine Fouti N'Da (Ethiopia) Trhas Gebreyohanis
CONCACAF	(Mexico) Quetzalli Alvarado Godinez (Canada) Carol Anne Chenard (United States) Margaret Domka (Canada) Michelle Pye (reserve)	(Canada) Marie-Josée Charbonneau (Mexico) Mayte Ivonne Chavez Garcia (United States) Marlene Duffy (Canada) Suzanne Morisset (Honduras) Shirley Susana Perello Lopez (United States) Veronica Perez
CONMEBOL	(Argentina) Jesica Salome Di Iorio (Uruguay) Claudia Ines Umpierrez Rodriguez (reserve)	(Uruguay) Mariana Betina Corbo Odone (Argentina) Maria Eugenia Rocco
OFC	(Fiji) Finau Vulivuli	(New Zealand) Jacqueline Stephenson (New Zealand) Sarah Walker
UEFA	(Finland) Kirsi Heikkinen (Ukraine) Kateryna Monzul (Switzerland) Esther Staubli (Germany) Bibiana Steinhaus (Italy) Carina Vitulano (Hungary) Katalin Kulcsár (reserve)	(Belgium) Ella De Vries (Finland) Anu Jokela (Greece) Chrysoula Kourompylia (England) Sian Massey (Sweden) Anna Nyström (Finland) Tonja Paavola (Spain) Yolando Pargo Rodriguez (Czech Republic) Lucie Ratajová (Germany) Katrin Rafalski (Germany) Marina Wozniak

== Squads ==
Each team named a squad of 21 players (three of whom must be goalkeepers) by the FIFA deadline. The squads were announced by FIFA on 25 July 2014.

== Final draw ==
The final draw was held on 1 March 2014 in Montreal. Confederation champions France, South Korea and United States were put in Pot 1 alongside the hosts Canada, who were automatically assigned to Position A1. The draw then made sure no teams of the same confederation could meet in the group stage.

Pot 1 (Seeded teams)	Pot 2 (AFC & CONCACAF)	Pot 3 (CAF & CONMEBOL)	Pot 4 (OFC & UEFA)
Canada; France; South Korea; United States	China; Costa Rica; Mexico; North Korea	Brazil; Ghana; Nigeria; Paraguay	England; Finland; Germany; New Zealand

== Group stage ==
The schedule of the tournament was announced on 6 August 2013.

The winners and runners-up of each group advance to the quarter-finals. The rankings of teams in each group are determined as follows:

1. points obtained in all group matches;
2. goal difference in all group matches;
3. number of goals scored in all group matches;

If two or more teams are equal on the basis of the above three criteria, their rankings are determined as follows:

1. points obtained in the group matches between the teams concerned;
2. goal difference in the group matches between the teams concerned;
3. number of goals scored in the group matches between the teams concerned;
4. drawing of lots by the FIFA Organising Committee.

Key to colours in group tables
Group winners and runners-up advance to the Quarter-finals

All times are local:

- Edmonton in Mountain Daylight Time (MDT) (UTC−6)
- Montreal and Toronto in Eastern Daylight Time (EDT) (UTC−4)
- Moncton in Atlantic Daylight Time (ADT) (UTC−3)

=== Group A ===
Team	Pld	W	D	L	GF	GA	GD	Pts
North Korea	3	2	0	1	5	2	+3	6
Canada	3	2	0	1	4	3	+1	6
Ghana	3	2	0	1	3	4	−1	6
Finland	3	0	0	3	4	7	−3	0

5 August 2014
17:00 EDT

Finland	1–2	North Korea
Laaksonen 28'	Report	Kim So-hyang 15'; Choe Yun-gyong 27'

National Soccer Stadium, Toronto
Attendance: 14,834
Referee: Quetzalli Alvarado (Mexico)
5 August 2014
20:00 EDT

Canada	0–1	Ghana
	Report	Sumaila 22'

National Soccer Stadium, Toronto
Attendance: 14,834
Referee: Bibiana Steinhaus (Germany)

8 August 2014
17:00 EDT

Ghana	0–3	North Korea
	Report	Ri Un-sim 6', 78'; Jon So-yon 90+4' (pen.)

National Soccer Stadium, Toronto
Attendance: 16,503
Referee: Carina Vitulano (Italy)
(replaced by Katalin Kulcsár (Hungary) in the 11th minute due to injury)
8 August 2014
20:00 EDT

Canada	3–2	Finland
Beckie 48'; Sanderson 50'; Prince 80'	Report	Kemppi 3', 21'

National Soccer Stadium, Toronto
Attendance: 16,503
Referee: Sachiko Yamagishi (Japan)

12 August 2014
19:00 EDT

North Korea	0–1	Canada
	Report	Beckie 65'

Olympic Stadium, Montreal
Attendance: 13,031
Referee: Esther Staubli (Switzerland)
12 August 2014
20:00 ADT

Ghana	2–1	Finland
Sumaila 71'; Cudjoe 86'	Report	Kemppi 50'

Moncton Stadium, Moncton
Attendance: 4,708
Referee: Salomé di Iorio (Argentina)

=== Group B ===
The 5–5 draw by Germany and China tied the tournament record for most goals in a match and set a new record for highest scoring draw.

Team	Pld	W	D	L	GF	GA	GD	Pts
Germany	3	2	1	0	12	6	+6	7
United States	3	2	0	1	4	2	+2	6
China	3	0	2	1	6	9	−3	2
Brazil	3	0	1	2	2	7	−5	1

5 August 2014
17:00 MDT

Germany	2–0	United States
Petermann 65'; Panfil 90'	Report

Commonwealth Stadium, Edmonton
Attendance: 10,101
Referee: Sachiko Yamagishi (Japan)
5 August 2014
20:00 MDT

China	1–1	Brazil
Zhang Zhu 89'	Report	Byanca 66'

Commonwealth Stadium, Edmonton
Attendance: 10,101
Referee: Esther Staubli (Switzerland)

8 August 2014
17:00 MDT

Germany	5–5	China
Bremer 10'; Däbritz 45+1', 68' (pen.); Panfil 51', 71'	Report	Zhu Beiyan 40', 62' (pen.); Tang Jiali 48'; Lei Jiahui 52'; Zhang Chen 80'

Commonwealth Stadium, Edmonton
Attendance: 10,025
Referee: Quetzalli Alvarado (Mexico)
8 August 2014
20:00 MDT

United States	1–0	Brazil
Horan 82'	Report

Commonwealth Stadium, Edmonton
Attendance: 10,025
Referee: Kirsi Heikkinen (Finland)

12 August 2014
16:00 EDT

Brazil	1–5	Germany
Carol 41'	Report	Däbritz 50', 78', 90+1'; Bremer 64', 90+3'

Olympic Stadium, Montreal
Attendance: 13,031
Referee: Carol Anne Chenard (Canada)
12 August 2014
17:00 ADT

United States	3–0	China
Horan 19', 38'; Lavelle 49'	Report

Moncton Stadium, Moncton
Attendance: 4,708
Referee: Katalin Kulcsár (Hungary)

=== Group C ===
Team	Pld	W	D	L	GF	GA	GD	Pts
Nigeria	3	2	1	0	5	3	+2	7
South Korea	3	1	1	1	4	4	0	4
England	3	0	2	1	3	4	−1	2 (Note: Tie on all criterias, alphabetical order was used.)
Mexico	3	0	2	1	3	4	−1	2

Notes:
6 August 2014
17:00 ADT

England	1–1	South Korea
Harris 68'	Report	Lee So-dam 15' (pen.)

Moncton Stadium, Moncton
Attendance: 3,587
Referee: Carol Anne Chenard (Canada)
6 August 2014
20:00 ADT

Mexico	1–1	Nigeria
Ibarra 23'	Report	Igbinovia 42'

Moncton Stadium, Moncton
Attendance: 3,587
Referee: Salomé di Iorio (Argentina)

9 August 2014
14:00 ADT

England	1–1	Mexico
Mead 36'	Report	Samarzich 70'

Moncton Stadium, Moncton
Attendance: 4,636
Referee: Finau Vulivuli (Fiji)
9 August 2014
17:00 ADT

South Korea	1–2	Nigeria
Kim So-yi 72'	Report	Dike 1'; Ihezuo 36'

Moncton Stadium, Moncton
Attendance: 4,636
Referee: Margaret Domka (United States)

13 August 2014
18:00 MDT

Nigeria	2–1	England
Ayila 41'; Oshoala 59' (pen.)	Report	Parris 5'

Commonwealth Stadium, Edmonton
Attendance: 7,301
Referee: Qin Liang (China)
13 August 2014
20:00 EDT

South Korea	2–1	Mexico
Lee Geum-min 43'; Lee So-dam 65' (pen.)	Report	Samarzich 74'

National Soccer Stadium, Toronto
Attendance: 6,914
Referee: Kateryna Monzul (Ukraine)

=== Group D ===
Team	Pld	W	D	L	GF	GA	GD	Pts
France	3	3	0	0	12	1	+11	9
New Zealand	3	2	0	1	5	4	+1	6
Paraguay	3	1	0	2	2	6	−4	3
Costa Rica	3	0	0	3	2	10	−8	0

6 August 2014
17:00 EDT

France	5–1	Costa Rica
Lavogez 7' (pen.), 38'; Robert 18'; F. Villalobos 22' (o.g.); Sarr 53'	Report	Herrera 90+1'

Olympic Stadium, Montreal
Attendance: 4,812
Referee: Qin Liang (China)
6 August 2014
20:00 EDT

New Zealand	2–0	Paraguay
Rolston 40'; Skilton 43'	Report

Olympic Stadium, Montreal
Attendance: 4,812
Referee: Kateryna Monzul (Ukraine)

9 August 2014
17:00 EDT

New Zealand	0–4	France
	Report	Diani 22'; Lavogez 53'; Le Bihan 80', 82'

Olympic Stadium, Montreal
Attendance: 6,844
Referee: Therese Sagno (Guinea)
9 August 2014
20:00 EDT

Paraguay	2–1	Costa Rica
Romero 4'; Mora 88' (pen.)	Report	Montero 29'

Olympic Stadium, Montreal
Attendance: 6,844
Referee: Bibiana Steinhaus (Germany)

13 August 2014
17:00 EDT

Costa Rica	0–3	New Zealand
	Report	Skilton 24'; Lee 69'; O'Brien 90+4'

National Soccer Stadium, Toronto
Attendance: 6,914
Referee: Kirsi Heikkinen (Finland)
13 August 2014
15:00 MDT

Paraguay	0–3	France
	Report	Robert 5' (pen.), 7'; Tarrieu 77'

Commonwealth Stadium, Edmonton
Attendance: 7,301
Referee: Margaret Domka (United States)

== Knockout stage ==
In the knockout stages, if a match is level at the end of normal playing time, extra time is played (two periods of 15 minutes each) and followed, if necessary, by a penalty shoot-out to determine the winner, except for the third place match where no extra time is played as the match is played directly before the final.

Quarter-finals
16 August — Toronto
North Korea (pen.)	1 (3)
United States	1 (1)
17 August — Moncton
Nigeria	4
New Zealand	1
16 August — Edmonton
Germany	2
Canada	0
17 August — Montreal
France (pen.)	0 (4)
South Korea	0 (3)

Semi-finals
20 August — Moncton
North Korea	2
Nigeria	6
20 August — Montreal
Germany	2
France	1

Final
24 August — Montreal
Nigeria	0
Germany (a.e.t.)	1
Third place
24 August — Montreal
North Korea	2
France	3

=== Quarter-finals ===
16 August 2014
17:00 EDT

North Korea	1–1 (a.e.t.)	United States
Jon So-yon 54' (pen.)	Report	Doniak 6'
Penalties
Jon So-yon (penalty scored); Choe Yun-gyong (penalty missed); Ri Kyong-hyang (penalty scored); Rim Se-ok (penalty scored)	3–1	(penalty missed) Jordan; (penalty missed) Horan; (penalty missed) Lavelle; (penalty scored) Amack

National Soccer Stadium, Toronto
Attendance: 7,854
Referee: Bibiana Steinhaus (Germany)

16 August 2014
18:00 MDT

Germany	2–0	Canada
Bremer 24'; Knaak 82'	Report

Commonwealth Stadium, Edmonton
Attendance: 22,421
Referee: Salomé di Iorio (Argentina)

17 August 2014
17:00 ADT

Nigeria	4–1	New Zealand
Oshoala 1', 12'; Sunday 84', 90'	Report	Rolston 89'

Moncton Stadium, Moncton
Attendance: 3,588
Referee: Sachiko Yamagishi (Japan)

17 August 2014
19:00 EDT

France	0–0 (a.e.t.)	South Korea
	Report
Penalties
Toletti (penalty scored); Dafeur (penalty missed); Mbock Bathy (penalty scored); Perisset (penalty scored); Lavogez (penalty scored)	4–3	(penalty missed) Jang Sel-gi; (penalty scored) Oh Yeon-hee; (penalty scored) Kim Hye-yeong; (penalty missed) Namgung Ye-ji; (penalty scored) Lee Su-bin

Olympic Stadium, Montreal
Attendance: 4,954
Referee: Quetzalli Alvarado (Mexico)

=== Semi-finals ===
20 August 2014
17:00 ADT

North Korea	2–6	Nigeria
Ri Un-sim 31'; Jon So-yon 62' (pen.)	Report	Dike 2'; Oshoala 24', 60', 68', 85'; Sunday 55'

Moncton Stadium, Moncton
Attendance: 4,871
Referee: Margaret Domka (United States)

20 August 2014
19:00 EDT

Germany	2–1	France
Bremer 12'; Petermann 81'	Report	Mbock Bathy 45'

Olympic Stadium, Montreal
Attendance: 6,634
Referee: Katalin Kulcsár (Hungary)

=== Third place match ===
24 August 2014
16:00 EDT

North Korea	2–3	France
Ri Un-yong 48'; Choe Un-hwa 68'	Report	Lavogez 53'; Diallo 66'; Tounkara 79'

Olympic Stadium, Montreal
Attendance: 15,822
Referee: Sachiko Yamagishi (Japan)

=== Final ===
The pairing Nigeria vs Germany is a repeat of the 2010 final which Germany won 2–0. Germany won their third title and joined USA in first place with three titles each.

24 August 2014
19:00 EDT

Nigeria	0–1 (a.e.t.)	Germany
	Report	Petermann 98'

Olympic Stadium, Montreal
Attendance: 15,822
Referee: Carol Anne Chenard (Canada)

2014 FIFA U-20 Women's World Cup winners

Germany
3rd title

== Awards ==
The following awards were given for the tournament:

Golden Ball	Silver Ball	Bronze Ball
(Nigeria) Asisat Oshoala	(France) Griedge Mbock Bathy	(France) Claire Lavogez
Golden Shoe	Silver Shoe	Bronze Shoe
(Nigeria) Asisat Oshoala	(Germany) Pauline Bremer	(Germany) Sara Däbritz
7 goals	5 goals	5 goals
Golden Glove
(Germany) Meike Kämper
FIFA Fair Play Award
Canada

== Goalscorers ==
7 goals

- (Nigeria) Asisat Oshoala

5 goals

- (Germany) Pauline Bremer
- (Germany) Sara Däbritz

4 goals

- (France) Claire Lavogez

3 goals

- (Finland) Juliette Kemppi
- (France) Faustine Robert
- (Germany) Theresa Panfil
- (Germany) Lena Petermann
- (Nigeria) Uchechi Sunday
- (North Korea) Jon So-yon
- (North Korea) Ri Un-sim
- (United States) Lindsey Horan

2 goals

- (Canada) Janine Beckie
- (China) Zhu Beiyan
- (France) Clarisse Le Bihan
- (Ghana) Sherifatu Sumaila
- (Mexico) Tanya Samarzich
- (New Zealand) Emma Rolston
- (New Zealand) Steph Skilton
- (Nigeria) Courtney Dike
- (South Korea) Lee So-dam

1 goal

- (Brazil) Byanca Brasil
- (Brazil) Carol Baiana
- (Canada) Nichelle Prince
- (Canada) Valerie Sanderson
- (China) Lei Jiahui
- (China) Tang Jiali
- (China) Zhang Chen
- (China) Zhang Zhu
- (Costa Rica) Melissa Herrera
- (Costa Rica) Michelle Montero
- (England) Martha Harris
- (England) Beth Mead
- (England) Nikita Parris
- (Finland) Sini Laaksonen
- (France) Aminata Diallo
- (France) Kadidiatou Diani
- (France) Griedge Mbock Bathy
- (France) Ouleymata Sarr
- (France) Mylaine Tarrieu
- (France) Aissatou Tounkara
- (Germany) Rebecca Knaak
- (Ghana) Jennifer Cudjoe
- (Mexico) Fabiola Ibarra
- (New Zealand) Megan Lee
- (New Zealand) Tayla O'Brien
- (Nigeria) Loveth Ayila
- (Nigeria) Osarenoma Igbinovia
- (Nigeria) Chinwendu Ihezuo
- (North Korea) Choe Un-hwa
- (North Korea) Choe Yun-gyong
- (North Korea) Kim So-hyang
- (North Korea) Ri Un-yong
- (Paraguay) Jennifer Mora
- (Paraguay) Silvana Romero
- (South Korea) Kim So-yi
- (South Korea) Lee Geum-min
- (United States) Makenzy Doniak
- (United States) Rose Lavelle

1 own goal

- (Costa Rica) Fabiola Villalobos (playing against France)

Source: FIFA
