= 2018 FIFA U-20 Women's World Cup =

Coupe du monde de football féminin des moins de 20 ans 2018 Kib vell-droad ar bed ur vaouez dindan 20 bloazioù 2018

Tournament details
- Host country: France
- Dates: 5–24 August
- Teams: 16 (from 6 confederations)
- Venue: 4 (in 4 host cities)

Final positions
- Champions: Japan (1st title)
- Runners-up: Spain
- Third place: England
- Fourth place: France

Tournament statistics
- Matches played: 32
- Goals scored: 98 (3.06 per match)
- Attendance: 75,748 (2,367 per match)
- Top scorer(s): (England) Georgia Stanway (Spain) Patricia Guijarro (6 goals each)
- Best player: (Spain) Patricia Guijarro
- Best goalkeeper: (England) Sandy MacIver
- Fair play award: Japan

The 2018 FIFA U-20 Women's World Cup was the ninth edition of the FIFA U-20 Women's World Cup, the biennial international women's youth football championship contested by the under-20 national teams of the member associations of FIFA, since its inception in 2002 as the FIFA U-19 Women's World Championship (age limit was raised from 19 to 20 in 2006).

The tournament was held in France between 5 and 24 August 2018, who would also host the 2019 FIFA Women's World Cup. Haiti and the Netherlands made their U-20 Women's World Cup debuts. North Korea were the defending champions but were eliminated by host France in the quarter-finals.

The final took place at Stade de la Rabine, Vannes between Spain and Japan, a rematch from the group stage. Japan won their first title, beating Spain 3–1 in the Final.

== Host selection ==
On 6 March 2014, FIFA announced that bidding had begun for the 2018 FIFA U-20 Women's World Cup. Member associations interested in hosting must submit a declaration of interest by 15 April 2014, and provide the complete set of bidding documents by 31 October 2014. The FIFA Executive Committee would select the hosts in 2015. In principle, FIFA preferred the 2019 FIFA Women's World Cup and the 2018 FIFA U-20 Women's World Cup to be hosted by the same member association, but if circumstances required, FIFA reserved the right to award the hosting of the events separately.

The following countries made official bids for hosting the 2018 FIFA U-20 Women's World Cup and the 2019 FIFA Women's World Cup by submitting their documents by 31 October 2014:

- France
- South Korea

The following countries withdrew their bid for hosting the 2018 FIFA U-20 Women's World Cup and the 2019 FIFA Women's World Cup:

- England - England registered an expression of interest by the April 2014 deadline, but in June 2014 it was announced that they would no longer proceed.
- New Zealand - New Zealand registered an expression of interest by the April 2014 deadline, but in June 2014 it was announced that they would no longer proceed.
- South Africa - South Africa registered an expression of interest by the April 2014 deadline, but in June 2014 it was announced that they would no longer proceed.

France were awarded the hosting rights of both tournaments by the FIFA Executive Committee on 19 March 2015.

== Qualified teams ==
A total of 16 teams qualified for the final tournament. In addition to France, which qualified automatically as hosts, the other 15 teams qualified from six separate continental competitions. The slot allocation was approved by the FIFA Council on 13–14 October 2016.

| Confederation | Qualifying tournament | Team | Appearance | Last appearance | Previous best performance |
|---|---|---|---|---|---|
| AFC (Asia) | 2017 AFC U-19 Women's Championship | China | 6th | 2014 | Runners-up (2004, 2006) |
| AFC (Asia) | 2017 AFC U-19 Women's Championship | Japan | 6th | 2016 | Third place (2012, 2016) |
| AFC (Asia) | 2017 AFC U-19 Women's Championship | North Korea | 7th | 2016 | Champions (2006, 2016) |
| CAF (Africa) | 2018 African U-20 Women's World Cup Qualifying Tournament | Ghana | 5th | 2016 | Group stage (2010, 2012, 2014, 2016) |
| CAF (Africa) | 2018 African U-20 Women's World Cup Qualifying Tournament | Nigeria | 9th | 2016 | Runners-up (2010, 2014) |
| CONCACAF (North, Central America & Caribbean) | 2018 CONCACAF Women's U-20 Championship | Haiti | 1st | None | Debut |
| CONCACAF (North, Central America & Caribbean) | 2018 CONCACAF Women's U-20 Championship | Mexico | 8th | 2016 | Quarter-finals (2010, 2012, 2016) |
| CONCACAF (North, Central America & Caribbean) | 2018 CONCACAF Women's U-20 Championship | United States | 9th | 2016 | Champions (2002, 2008, 2012) |
| CONMEBOL (South America) | 2018 South American U-20 Women's Championship | Brazil | 9th | 2016 | Third place (2006) |
| CONMEBOL (South America) | 2018 South American U-20 Women's Championship | Paraguay | 2nd | 2014 | Group stage (2014) |
| OFC (Oceania) | 2017 OFC U-19 Women's Championship | New Zealand | 7th | 2016 | Quarter-finals (2014) |
| UEFA (Europe) | Host nation | France | 7th | 2016 | Runners-up (2016) |
| UEFA (Europe) | 2017 UEFA Women's Under-19 Championship | England | 5th | 2014 | Quarter-finals (2002, 2008) |
| UEFA (Europe) | 2017 UEFA Women's Under-19 Championship | Germany | 9th | 2016 | Champions (2004, 2010, 2014) |
| UEFA (Europe) | 2017 UEFA Women's Under-19 Championship | Netherlands | 1st | None | Debut |
| UEFA (Europe) | 2017 UEFA Women's Under-19 Championship | Spain | 3rd | 2016 | Quarter-finals (2016) |

== Venues ==
The four host cities, all located in the region of Brittany, were announced on 7 September 2017. The opening match, semi-finals, third place match and final were played in Vannes.

| Vannes | Concarneau | Saint-Malo | Dinan-Léhon |
|---|---|---|---|
| Stade de la Rabine | Stade Guy Piriou | Stade de Marville | Stade du Clos Gastel |
| Capacity: 9,500 | Capacity: 5,800 | Capacity: 2,500 | Capacity: 2,000 |
| Location of the region of Brittany in France. | | Location of the host cities of the 2018 FIFA U-20 Women's World Cup in the region of Brittany. | |

== Branding ==
The official emblem was unveiled on 22 September 2017.

== Draw ==
The official draw was held on 8 March 2018, 11:00 CET (UTC+1), at the Rennes Opera House in Rennes. The teams were seeded based on their performances in previous U-20 Women's World Cups and confederation tournaments, with the hosts France automatically seeded and assigned to position A1. Teams of the same confederation could not meet in the group stage, except for UEFA with five teams so one group would contain two UEFA teams.

| Pot 1 | Pot 2 | Pot 3 | Pot 4 |
|---|---|---|---|
| France; Germany; North Korea; Japan | United States; Nigeria; Mexico; New Zealand | Brazil; Spain; Ghana; China | England; Paraguay; Haiti; Netherlands |

== Squads ==
Players born between 1 January 1998 and 31 December 2002 were eligible to compete in the tournament. Each team had to name a preliminary squad of 35 players. From the preliminary squad, the team had to name a final squad of 21 players (three of whom must be goalkeepers) by the FIFA deadline. Players in the final squad could be replaced due to serious injury up to 24 hours prior to kickoff of the team's first match.

== Match officials ==
A total of 15 referees and 30 assistant referees were appointed by FIFA for the tournament.

| Confederation | Referees | Assistant referees |
|---|---|---|
| AFC | (Australia) Kate Jacewicz (China) Qin Liang (North Korea) Ri Hyang-ok | (Australia) Renae Coghill (China) Fang Yan (China) Cui Yongmei (India) Uvena Fernandes (North Korea) Hong Kum-nyo (South Korea) Kim Kyoung-min |
| CAF | (Ethiopia) Lidya Tafesse Abebe (Zambia) Gladys Lengwe | (Malawi) Bernadettar Kwimbira (Kenya) Mary Njoroge (Madagascar) Lidwine Rakotozafinoro (Mauritius) Queency Victoire |
| CONCACAF | (Canada) Carol Anne Chenard (Honduras) Melissa Borjas | (Canada) Chantal Boudreau (Mexico) Yudilia Briones (United States) Kathryn Nesbitt (Honduras) Shirley Perelló |
| CONMEBOL | (Brazil) Edina Alves Batista (Uruguay) Claudia Umpiérrez | (Ecuador) Mónica Amboya (Brazil) Neuza Back (Uruguay) Luciana Mascaraña (Brazil) Tatiane Sacilotti |
| OFC | (New Zealand) Anna-Marie Keighley | (Tonga) Lata Kaumatule (Samoa) Maria Salamasina |
| UEFA | (Czech Republic) Jana Adámková (France) Stéphanie Frappart (Ukraine) Kateryna Monzul (Switzerland) Esther Staubli (Germany) Bibiana Steinhaus | (Romania) Petruta Iugulescu (Greece) Chrysoula Kourompylia (Switzerland) Susanne Küng (England) Sian Massey (France) Manuela Nicolosi (Republic of Ireland) Michelle O'Neill (Switzerland) Belinda Pierre (Germany) Katrin Rafalski (Croatia) Sanja Rodak (Ukraine) Maryna Striletska |

== Group stage ==
The official schedule was unveiled on 17 January 2018.

The top two teams of each group advanced to the quarter-finals. The rankings of teams in each group were determined as follows (regulations Article 17.7):

1. points obtained in all group matches;
2. goal difference in all group matches;
3. number of goals scored in all group matches;

If two or more teams were equal on the basis of the above three criteria, their rankings were determined as follows:

4. points obtained in the group matches between the teams concerned;
5. goal difference in the group matches between the teams concerned;
6. number of goals scored in the group matches between the teams concerned;
7. fair play points in all group matches:
  - first yellow card: minus 1 point;
  - indirect red card (second yellow card): minus 3 points;
  - direct red card: minus 4 points;
  - yellow card and direct red card: minus 5 points;
8. drawing of lots by the FIFA Organising Committee.

All times are local, CEST (UTC+2).

=== Group A ===
| Pos | Team | Pld | W | D | L | GF | GA | GD | Pts | Qualification |
|---|---|---|---|---|---|---|---|---|---|---|
| 1 | France (H) | 3 | 2 | 1 | 0 | 8 | 1 | +7 | 7 | Knockout stage |
| 2 | Netherlands | 3 | 2 | 0 | 1 | 6 | 5 | +1 | 6 | Knockout stage |
| 3 | Ghana | 3 | 1 | 0 | 2 | 2 | 8 | −6 | 3 | |
| 4 | New Zealand | 3 | 0 | 1 | 2 | 1 | 3 | −2 | 1 | |

Source: FIFA
Rules for classification: Group stage tiebreakers
(H) Hosts
5 August 2018
16:30

| New Zealand | 1–2 | Netherlands |
|---|---|---|
| Blake 44' | Report | Kalma 28'; Van Deursen 78' |

Stade de la Rabine, Vannes
Attendance: 2,042
Referee: Jana Adámková (Czech Republic)
5 August 2018
19:30

| France | 4–1 | Ghana |
|---|---|---|
| Laurent 6', 31'; Fercocq 27'; Baltimore 90+7' | Report | Owusu-Ansah 58' |

Stade de la Rabine, Vannes
Attendance: 4,889
Referee: Kateryna Monzul (Ukraine)

8 August 2018
16:30

| Netherlands | 4–0 | Ghana |
|---|---|---|
| Nouwen 21'; Kalma 28', 32'; Pelova 80' | Report |

Stade de la Rabine, Vannes
Attendance: 1,709
Referee: Ri Hyang-ok (North Korea)
8 August 2018
19:30

| France | 0–0 | New Zealand |
|---|---|---|
| | Report |

Stade de la Rabine, Vannes
Attendance: 5,031
Referee: Lidya Tafesse Abebe (Ethiopia)

12 August 2018
16:30

| Netherlands | 0–4 | France |
|---|---|---|
| | Report | Delabre 10', 31' (pen.), 33'; Laurent 72' |

Stade de Marville, Saint-Malo
Attendance: 2,262
Referee: Esther Staubli (Switzerland)
12 August 2018
16:30

| Ghana | 1–0 | New Zealand |
|---|---|---|
| Anima 75' | Report |

Stade Guy Piriou, Concarneau
Attendance: 1,056
Referee: Edina Alves Batista (Brazil)

=== Group B ===
| Pos | Team | Pld | W | D | L | GF | GA | GD | Pts | Qualification |
|---|---|---|---|---|---|---|---|---|---|---|
| 1 | England | 3 | 2 | 1 | 0 | 10 | 3 | +7 | 7 | Knockout stage |
| 2 | North Korea | 3 | 2 | 0 | 1 | 5 | 5 | 0 | 6 | Knockout stage |
| 3 | Mexico | 3 | 1 | 0 | 2 | 5 | 10 | −5 | 3 | |
| 4 | Brazil | 3 | 0 | 1 | 2 | 4 | 6 | −2 | 1 | |

Source: FIFA
Rules for classification: Group stage tiebreakers
5 August 2018
13:30

| Mexico | 3–2 | Brazil |
|---|---|---|
| Martínez 4'; Ovalle 52', 63' | Report | Kerolin 6', 17' |

Stade du Clos Gastel, Dinan-Léhon
Attendance: 1,127
Referee: Esther Staubli (Switzerland)
5 August 2018
16:30

| North Korea | 1–3 | England |
|---|---|---|
| Ja Un-yong 71' | Report | Russo 31', 73'; Stanway 60' |

Stade du Clos Gastel, Dinan-Léhon
Attendance: 1,464
Referee: Stéphanie Frappart (France)

8 August 2018
13:30

| Brazil | 1–1 | England |
|---|---|---|
| Ariadina 90+2' | Report | Stanway 11' (pen.) |

Stade du Clos Gastel, Dinan-Léhon
Attendance: 1,981
Referee: Melissa Borjas (Honduras)
8 August 2018
16:30

| North Korea | 2–1 | Mexico |
|---|---|---|
| Choe Kum-ok 14'; Kim Kyong-yong 85' | Report | Ovalle 12' |

Stade du Clos Gastel, Dinan-Léhon
Attendance: 1,591
Referee: Claudia Umpiérrez (Uruguay)

12 August 2018
13:30

| Brazil | 1–2 | North Korea |
|---|---|---|
| Geyse 68' | Report | Son Sun-im 44'; Choe Kum-ok 90+3' |

Stade Guy Piriou, Concarneau
Attendance: 1,056
Referee: Bibiana Steinhaus (Germany)
12 August 2018
13:30

| England | 6–1 | Mexico |
|---|---|---|
| Russo 49'; Kelly 53'; Hemp 62', 68', 80'; Stanway 64' | Report | Ovalle 37' |

Stade de Marville, Saint-Malo
Attendance: 1,362
Referee: Kate Jacewicz (Australia)

=== Group C ===
| Pos | Team | Pld | W | D | L | GF | GA | GD | Pts | Qualification |
|---|---|---|---|---|---|---|---|---|---|---|
| 1 | Spain | 3 | 2 | 1 | 0 | 7 | 3 | +4 | 7 | Knockout stage |
| 2 | Japan | 3 | 2 | 0 | 1 | 7 | 1 | +6 | 6 | Knockout stage |
| 3 | United States | 3 | 1 | 1 | 1 | 8 | 3 | +5 | 4 | |
| 4 | Paraguay | 3 | 0 | 0 | 3 | 1 | 16 | −15 | 0 | |

Source: FIFA
Rules for classification: Group stage tiebreakers
6 August 2018
16:30

| Paraguay | 1–4 | Spain |
|---|---|---|
| J. Martínez 62' | Report | Guijarro 40', 64', 90+6'; Pina 49' |

Stade Guy Piriou, Concarneau
Attendance: 1,587
Referee: Kate Jacewicz (Australia)
6 August 2018
19:30

| United States | 0–1 | Japan |
|---|---|---|
| | Report | Hayashi 76' |

Stade Guy Piriou, Concarneau
Attendance: 2,332
Referee: Gladys Lengwe (Zambia)

9 August 2018
16:30

| Spain | 1–0 | Japan |
|---|---|---|
| Menayo 16' | Report |

Stade Guy Piriou, Concarneau
Attendance: 2,332
Referee: Kateryna Monzul (Ukraine)
9 August 2018
19:30

| United States | 6–0 | Paraguay |
|---|---|---|
| Smith 15', 63'; DeMelo 39', 44', 78'; Sanchez 46' | Report |

Stade Guy Piriou, Concarneau
Attendance: 2,117
Referee: Qin Liang (China PR)

13 August 2018
13:30

| Spain | 2–2 | United States |
|---|---|---|
| Guijarro 7'; García 42' | Report | Smith 83'; DeMelo 87' |

Stade du Clos Gastel, Dinan-Léhon
Attendance: 1,681
Referee: Anna-Marie Keighley (New Zealand)
13 August 2018
13:30

| Japan | 6–0 | Paraguay |
|---|---|---|
| Takarada 5', 18', 61'; Ueki 44', 45+3', 60' | Report |

Stade de la Rabine, Vannes
Attendance: 1,525
Referee: Gladys Lengwe (Zambia)

=== Group D ===
| Pos | Team | Pld | W | D | L | GF | GA | GD | Pts | Qualification |
|---|---|---|---|---|---|---|---|---|---|---|
| 1 | Germany | 3 | 3 | 0 | 0 | 6 | 2 | +4 | 9 | Knockout stage |
| 2 | Nigeria | 3 | 1 | 1 | 1 | 2 | 2 | 0 | 4 | Knockout stage |
| 3 | China | 3 | 1 | 1 | 1 | 3 | 4 | −1 | 4 | |
| 4 | Haiti | 3 | 0 | 0 | 3 | 3 | 6 | −3 | 0 | |

Source: FIFA
Rules for classification: Group stage tiebreakers
6 August 2018
13:30

| Nigeria | 0–1 | Germany |
|---|---|---|
| | Report | Sanders 69' |

Stade de Marville, Saint-Malo
Attendance: 823
Referee: Anna-Marie Keighley (New Zealand)
6 August 2018
16:30

| Haiti | 1–2 | China |
|---|---|---|
| Mondésir 78' (pen.) | Report | Zhao Yujie 13'; Shen Mengyu 46' |

Stade de Marville, Saint-Malo
Attendance: 2,015
Referee: Edina Alves Batista (Brazil)

9 August 2018
13:30

| Germany | 2–0 | China |
|---|---|---|
| Gwinn 31'; Freigang 40' | Report |

Stade de Marville, Saint-Malo
Attendance: 1,194
Referee: Carol Anne Chenard (Canada)
9 August 2018
16:30

| Haiti | 0–1 | Nigeria |
|---|---|---|
| | Report | Ajibade 36' (pen.) |

Stade de Marville, Saint-Malo
Attendance: 1,801
Referee: Jana Adámková (Czech Republic)

13 August 2018
16:30

| Germany | 3–2 | Haiti |
|---|---|---|
| Freigang 18'; Kögel 49'; Bühl 60' | Report | Mondésir 63', 73' |

Stade de la Rabine, Vannes
Attendance: 2,752
Referee: Lidya Tafesse Abebe (Ethiopia)
13 August 2018
16:30

| China | 1–1 | Nigeria |
|---|---|---|
| Zhang Linyan 41' | Report | Dou Jiaxing 90+5' (o.g.) |

Stade du Clos Gastel, Dinan-Léhon
Attendance: 1,534
Referee: Stéphanie Frappart (France)

== Knockout stage ==
In the knockout stages, if a match was level at the end of normal playing time, extra time would be played (two periods of 15 minutes each) and followed, if necessary, by a penalty shoot-out to determine the winner. However, for the third place match, no extra time was played and the winner was determined by a penalty shoot-out if necessary.

=== Bracket ===
Quarter-finals
16 August – Concarneau
France | 1
North Korea | 0
16 August – Concarneau
Spain | 2
Nigeria | 1
17 August – Vannes
England | 2
Netherlands | 1
17 August – Vannes
Germany | 1
Japan | 3

Semi-finals
20 August – Vannes
France | 0
Spain | 1
20 August – Vannes
England | 0
Japan | 2

Final
24 August – Vannes
Spain | 1
Japan | 3
Third place
24 August – Vannes
France | 1 (2)
England (p) | 1 (4)

=== Quarter-finals ===
16 August 2018
16:00

| Spain | 2–1 | Nigeria |
|---|---|---|
| Bonmatí 13'; Guijarro 45+2' | Report | Efih 57' |

Stade Guy Piriou, Concarneau
Attendance: 1,829
Referee: Qin Liang (China PR)

16 August 2018
19:30

| France | 1–0 | North Korea |
|---|---|---|
| Delabre 29' (pen.) | Report |

Stade Guy Piriou, Concarneau
Attendance: 2,462
Referee: Carol Anne Chenard (Canada)

17 August 2018
16:00

| England | 2–1 | Netherlands |
|---|---|---|
| Stanway 20', 23' | Report | Pelova 12' |

Stade de la Rabine, Vannes
Attendance: 2,737
Referee: Ri Hyang-ok (North Korea)

17 August 2018
19:30

| Germany | 1–3 | Japan |
|---|---|---|
| Minge 82' | Report | Endo 59'; Ueki 70'; Takarada 73' |

Stade de la Rabine, Vannes
Attendance: 3,211
Referee: Edina Alves Batista (Brazil)

=== Semi-finals ===
20 August 2018
16:00

| England | 0–2 | Japan |
|---|---|---|
| | Report | Ueki 22' Endo 27' |

Stade de la Rabine, Vannes
Attendance: 2,807
Referee: Claudia Umpiérrez (Uruguay)

20 August 2018
19:30

| France | 0–1 | Spain |
|---|---|---|
| | Report | Guijarro 51' |

Stade de la Rabine, Vannes
Attendance: 5,324
Referee: Melissa Borjas (Honduras)

=== Third place match ===
24 August 2018
16:00

| France | 1–1 | England |
|---|---|---|
| Laurent 68' (pen.) | Report | Stanway 46' |
Penalties
| Thibaud (penalty scored); Bacha (penalty missed); Laurent (penalty scored); Delabre (penalty missed) | 2–4 | (penalty scored) Stanway; (penalty scored) Hemp; (penalty missed) Russo; (penalty scored) Peplow; (penalty scored) Allen |

Stade de la Rabine, Vannes
Attendance: 4,706
Referee: Gladys Lengwe (Zambia)

=== Final ===
24 August 2018
19:30 UTC+2

| Spain | 1–3 | Japan |
|---|---|---|
| Andújar 71' | Report | Miyazawa 38'; Takarada 57'; Nagano 65' |

Stade de la Rabine, Vannes
Attendance: 5,409
Referee: Stéphanie Frappart (France)

2018 FIFA U-20 Women's World Cup winners

Japan
1st title

== Awards ==
The following awards were given for the tournament:

| Golden Ball | Silver Ball | Bronze Ball |
|---|---|---|
| (Spain) Patricia Guijarro | (Japan) Saori Takarada | (Japan) Moeka Minami |
| Golden Boot | Silver Boot | Bronze Boot |
| (Spain) Patricia Guijarro | (England) Georgia Stanway | (Japan) Saori Takarada |
| 6 goals, 3 assists | 6 goals | 5 goals, 3 assists |
Golden Glove
(England) Sandy MacIver
FIFA Fair Play Award
Japan

== Goalscorers ==
There were 98 goals scored in 32 matches, for an average of 3.06 goals per match.

6 goals

- (England) Georgia Stanway
- (Spain) Patricia Guijarro

5 goals

- (Japan) Saori Takarada
- (Japan) Riko Ueki

4 goals

- (France) Amélie Delabre
- (France) Emelyne Laurent
- (Mexico) Jacqueline Ovalle
- (United States) Savannah DeMelo

3 goals

- (England) Lauren Hemp
- (England) Alessia Russo
- (Haiti) Nérilia Mondésir
- (Netherlands) Fenna Kalma
- (United States) Sophia Smith

2 goals

- (Brazil) Kerolin
- (Germany) Laura Freigang
- (Japan) Jun Endo
- (Netherlands) Victoria Pelova
- (North Korea) Choe Kum-ok

1 goal

- (Brazil) Ariadina
- (Brazil) Geyse
- (China) Shen Mengyu
- (China) Zhang Linyan
- (China) Zhao Yujie
- (England) Chloe Kelly
- (France) Sandy Baltimore
- (France) Hélène Fercocq
- (Germany) Klara Bühl
- (Germany) Giulia Gwinn
- (Germany) Kristin Kögel
- (Germany) Janina Minge
- (Germany) Stefanie Sanders
- (Ghana) Ruth Anima
- (Ghana) Sandra Owusu-Ansah
- (Japan) Honoka Hayashi
- (Japan) Hinata Miyazawa
- (Japan) Fuka Nagano
- (Mexico) Katty Martínez
- (Netherlands) Eva van Deursen
- (Netherlands) Aniek Nouwen
- (Nigeria) Rasheedat Ajibade
- (Nigeria) Peace Efih
- (New Zealand) Hannah Blake
- (North Korea) Ja Un-yong
- (North Korea) Kim Kyong-yong
- (North Korea) Son Sun-im
- (Paraguay) Jessica Martínez
- (Spain) Candela Andújar
- (Spain) Aitana Bonmatí
- (Spain) Lucía García
- (Spain) Carmen Menayo
- (Spain) Clàudia Pina
- (United States) Ashley Sanchez

1 own goal

- (China) Dou Jiaxing (against Nigeria)
