= Paige Williams (footballer) =

English footballer (born 1995)

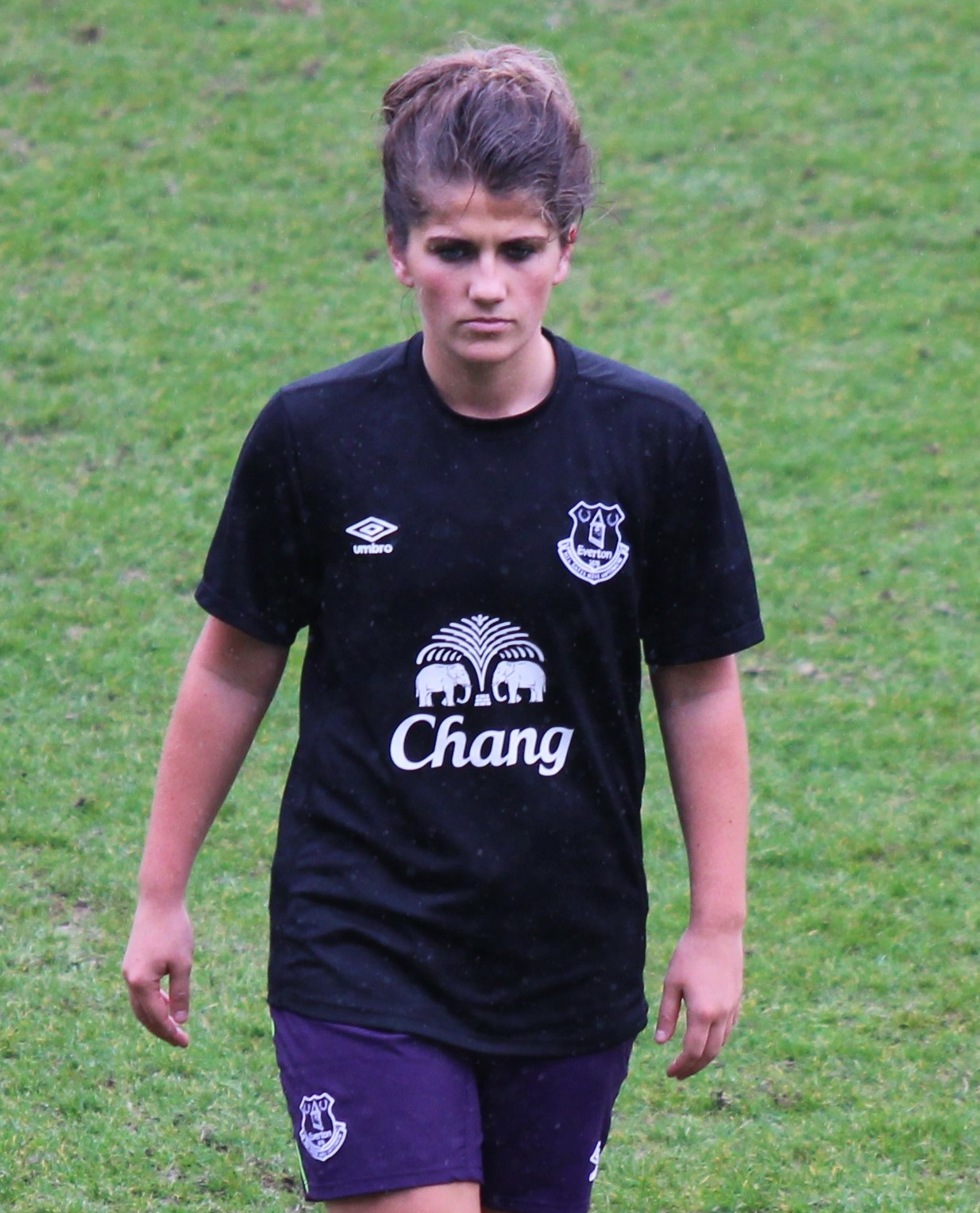

Personal information
- Full name: Paige Louise Williams
- Date of birth: 10 March 1995 (age 31)
- Place of birth: Liverpool, England
- Height: 1.74 m (5 ft 9 in)
- Position: Defender

Senior career*
Years	Team	Apps	(Gls)
2013–2014	Everton	10	(0)
2015–2016	ACF Brescia	14	(5)
2016–2017	AGSM Verona	7	(3)
2017–2019	Birmingham City	31	(0)

International career^{‡}
2010	England U15	2	(1)
2010–2012	England U17	13	(5)
2012–2013	England U19	11	(2)
2014	England U20	1	(0)
2014	England U23	8	(1)
- * Club domestic league appearances and goals as of 19:40, 20 November 2018 (UTC+1) ‡ National team caps and goals as of 10:44, 23 May 2017 (UTC)

Paige Louise Williams (10 March 1995) is a former English footballer who played as a defender. She previously played in the FA WSL and the Serie A, as well as representing England at youth level. She now works as a firefighter.

== Club career ==
A native of Liverpool, Williams joined the youth programme at Everton at age 14, later signing a professional contract with the club. She made her senior debut in 2013 but shortly afterwards suffered an anterior cruciate ligament injury that required surgery and forced her off the pitch for several months. In 2015, following a disappointing season for Everton in the FA WSL 2, Williams made the move to Italian side Brescia.

Following one season at Brescia, in which the club won the Serie A and the Italian Women's Cup, Williams made the move to Verona. In 2017 Williams returned to England, signing with Birmingham City. She left the club in 2019.

== International career ==
Williams has represented England on the under-15, under-17, under-19, under-20, and under-23 national teams. She was considered as one of England's most exciting emerging talents following strong performances at the 2013 UEFA Women's U-19 Championship, in which the team were runners-up. Her ACL injury threatened her chances of playing at the 2014 FIFA Women's U-20 World Cup but she recovered successfully in time to be selected. She went on to play for the U-23 side in several tournaments.

== After football ==
Following her departure from Birmingham, Williams experienced what she called "a bit of an identity crisis", working in a supermarket warehouse while contemplating her future in football. After the COVID-19 pandemic caused her to have further doubts, she decided to train as a firefighter. She took part in the 2024 British Firefighter Challenge.

== Personal life ==
Williams identifies as LGBT+ and is active in the Merseyside Fire and Rescue LGBT+ network. She has been in a relationship with MMA fighter Molly McCann.

== Honours ==
Brescia

- Serie A: 2015–16
- Italian Women's Cup: 2016

Everton

- Women's FA Cup runners up: 2013–14

England

- UEFA Women's Under-19 Championship - Runners Up 2013

Birmingham City

- Women's FA Cup: runners up 2016–17
