= François-Michel Le Tourneau =

French geographer

François-Michel Le Tourneau is a French geographer born in Léhon (Côtes d'Armor, France) in 1972. He is a senior research fellow at the French National Center for Scientific Research (CNRS). His work focuses on settlement and use of sparsely populated areas, especially the Brazilian Amazon. He studies indigenous people or traditional populations and their relationships with their territory. He has authored a number of papers in national and international scientific journals (list here on HAL-SHS, here on Researchgate or here on Academia.edu).

== Publications ==
Le Tourneau is the author of five main books:

1. Le Tourneau F.-M. Chercheurs d'or. L'orpaillage clandestin en Guyane française. Paris, CNRS Editions, 2020
2. Le Tourneau F.-M. (2019) "L'Amazonie, Histoire, Géographie, Environnement", Paris : CNRS Editions, 450 p. This book as awarded the Sophie Barluet 2019 prize and the 2020 Eugene Potron award by the French Geographical Society.
3. Le Tourneau F.-M. (2013) Le Jari, géohistoire d’un grand fleuve amazonien, Rennes : PUR, 248 p. This book as awarded the Louis Napoleon Bonaparte Wise award by the French Geographical Society in 2013.
4. Le Tourneau F.-M. (2010) Les Yanomami du Brésil, géographie d’un territoire amérindien. Belin : Paris, collection Mappemonde, 480 p.
5. Le Tourneau F.-M., Droulers M. (Dirs.) (2010) L’Amazonie brésilienne et le développement durable, Paris : Belin, 480 p.

== Expeditions ==
He organized a number of expeditions in remote and isolated regions of the Amazon and French Guiana, some of them were the subject of TV documentaries (see sources):

- 2021 : expedition Oyapock-Maroni: a 320 km trek from the eastern to the western side of French Guiana (blog)
- 2019 : expédition Camopi - Regina: a 450 km paddling expedition along two major French Guiana rivers in collaboration with the French Foreign Legion (blog, TV documentary film)
- 2015 : « le raid des 7 bornes », a 320 km hike along the border between French Guiana and Brazil, in collaboration with the French Foreign Legion (TV show, radio program, blog)
- 2013 : expédition Culari-Tampak, crossing between Brazil and French Guiana up the Jari and Culari rivers and then down the Tampak, (700 km of which 400 km canoeing) (radio program, interactive diary)
- 2011 : expédition Mapaoni, up the Jari and Mapaoni rivers in Brazil until the Trijonction point between Brazil, French Guiana and Suriname (1500 km) (TV show).

He has published on a blog in the French edition of the Huffington Post
