= 2018 FIFA U-20 Women's World Cup final =

- Event: 2018 FIFA U-20 Women's World Cup
Spain	Japan
(Spain)	(Japan)
1	3
- Date: 24 August 2018
- Venue: Stade de la Rabine, Vannes
- Referee: Stéphanie Frappart (France)
- Attendance: 5,409
- Weather: Cloudy; 19 °C (66 °F); 62% humidity

The 2018 FIFA U-20 Women's World Cup final was the final match of the 2018 FIFA U-20 Women's World Cup in France. The match was played at the Stade de la Rabine, located in Vannes, on 24 August 2018 and was contested by Spain and Japan. Japan won the match 3–1. It was Japan's first FIFA U-20 Women's World Cup title, making them the second Asian national team to ever win the trophy, after North Korea, who won it on 2006 and 2016. Coupled with North Korea's triumph in 2016, it was the only time where back-to-back tournaments were won by teams of the same confederation (AFC).

With this result, Japan become the first nation to win all FIFA Women's World Cup titles: U-17, U-20, and senior.

== Road to the final ==
Spain
Round
Japan
Opponent
Result
Group stage
Opponent
Result
Paraguay
4–1
Match 1
United States
1–0
Japan
1–0
Match 2
Spain
0–1
United States
2–2
Match 3
Paraguay
6–0
Group C winners

Pos	Team	Pld	Pts
1	Spain	3	7
2	Japan	3	6
3	United States	3	4
4	Paraguay	3	0

Source: FIFA
Final standings
Group C runners-up

Pos	Team	Pld	Pts
1	Spain	3	7
2	Japan	3	6
3	United States	3	4
4	Paraguay	3	0

Source: FIFA
Opponent
Result
Knockout stage
Opponent
Result
Nigeria
2–1
Quarter-finals
Germany
3–1
France
1–0
Semi-finals
England
2–0

== Match ==
=== Details ===
24 August 2018
19:30 UTC+2

Spain	1–3	Japan
Andújar 71'	Report	Miyazawa 38'; Takarada 57'; Nagano 65'

Stade de la Rabine, Vannes
Attendance: 5,409
Referee: Stéphanie Frappart (France)

Spain	Japan

GK	21	Cata Coll
RB	12	Lucía Rodríguez	(yellow card) 71'	(substituted off) 71'
CB	3	Berta Pujadas
CB	4	Laia Aleixandri	(yellow card) 78'
LB	11	Carmen Menayo
CM	8	Patri Guijarro (c)
CM	6	Damaris Egurrola
CM	18	Eva Navarro
RW	10	Maite Oroz		(substituted off) 80'
ST	20	Claudia Pina
LW	15	Candela Andújar
Substitutions:
MF	9	Paula Fernández		(substituted in) 71'
MF	19	Paula Sancho		(substituted in) 80'
Coach:
Pedro López

GK	16	Hannah Stambaugh
RB	13	Asato Miyagawa
CB	6	Hana Takahashi
CB	4	Moeka Minami (c)
LB	17	Nanami Kitamura
RM	9	Hinata Miyazawa
CM	7	Honoka Hayashi
CM	10	Fuka Nagano
LM	20	Jun Endo	(yellow card) 79'
ST	19	Riko Ueki
ST	11	Saori Takarada
Substitutions:
MF	14	Mami Muraoka		(substituted in) 90'
Coach:
Futoshi Ikeda

Assistant referees:
Manuela Nicolosi (France)
Michelle O'Neill (Ireland)
Fourth official:
Edina Alves Batista (Brazil)

Match rules:

- 90 minutes.
- 30 minutes of extra time if necessary.
- Penalty shoot-out if scores still level.
- Ten named eligible substitutes.
- Maximum of three substitutions, with a fourth allowed in extra time.
