= FIFA U-20 Women's World Cup =

International age group women's football tournament

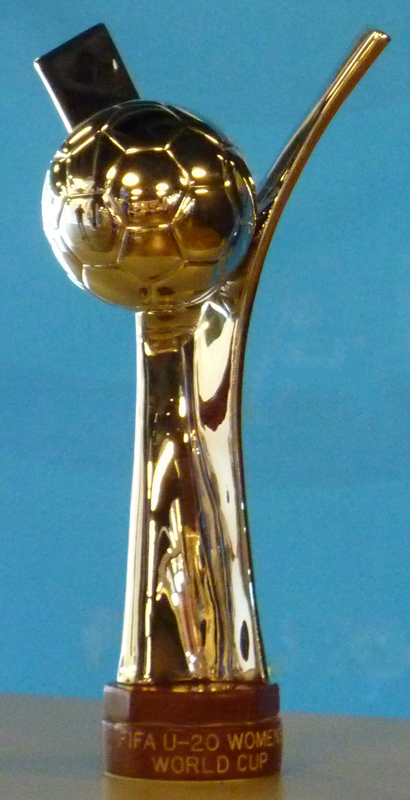
- The trophy awarded, base changed in 2012.
- Organiser(s): FIFA
- Founded: 2002; 24 years ago
- Region: International
- Teams: 24 (finals)
- Related competitions: FIFA U-20 World Cup; FIFA U-17 Women's World Cup
- Current champions: Spain (2nd title)
- Most championships: Germany; North Korea; United States (3 titles each)
- Website: fifa.com/u20womensworldcup
- 2028 FIFA U-20 Women's World Cup

The FIFA U-20 Women's World Cup is an international association football tournament, organized by FIFA (Fédération Internationale de Football Association), for national teams of women under the age of 20. The tournament is held in even-numbered years. It was first held in 2002 as the FIFA U-19 Women's World Championship with an upper age limit of 19. In 2006, the age limit was raised to the current 20. The event was renamed as a World Cup since the 2008 competition, making its name consistent with FIFA's other worldwide competitions for national teams.

Starting with the 2010 edition and ending with the 2018 edition, tournaments held in years immediately preceding the FIFA Women's World Cup were awarded as part of the bidding process for the Women's World Cup. In those years, the U-20 Women's World Cup served as a test event for the host nation of the Women's World Cup, a role similar to that of the former FIFA Confederations Cup in the men's game.

The current champions are Spain, who won their second title at the 2026 edition held in Poland.

== Qualification ==
Each continental governing body has its own qualifying tournament, but Africa does not determine a champion.

Confederation	Qualifier
AFC (Asia)	AFC U-20 Women's Asian Cup
CAF (Africa)	African U-20 Women's World Cup qualification
CONCACAF (North, Central America and Caribbean)	CONCACAF Women's U-20 Championship
CONMEBOL (South America)	CONMEBOL Sub 20 Femenino
OFC (Oceania)	OFC U-20 Women's Championship
UEFA (Europe)	UEFA Women's U-19 Championship

== History ==
The first women's world championship at the youth level, held as the 2002 FIFA U-19 Women's World Championship, with an age limit of 19, was hosted by Canada. The final, held at Commonwealth Stadium in Edmonton, drew a surprisingly large crowd of 47,000 to watch the hosts play the United States. The US defeated Canada 1–0 on a golden goal by Lindsay Tarpley. Canada's Christine Sinclair was the adidas Golden Ball recipient, as tournament MVP, and the Golden Shoe (10 goals) winner. The 2004 FIFA U-19 Women's World Championship was held in Thailand. For the second time in a row, the current holders of the senior World Cup, Germany, won the youth competition. The Golden Ball went to Brazilian star, Marta, while for the second time the Golden Boot went to a Canadian, Brittany Timko. In 2006, FIFA raised the women's youth championship age limit to 20 to match the men's, beginning with the 2006 FIFA U-20 Women's World Championship, held in Russia from 17 August through 3 September. The competition was held in four Moscow stadiums (Dinamo, Lokomotiv, Podmoskovie Stadium and Torpedo Stadion) and one in St. Petersburg (Petrovskiy Stadion). North Korea won the final 5–0 over China. The 2008 FIFA U-20 Women's World Championship was held in Chile, from 20 November to 7 December 2008. Six years after winning their first championship at the youth level in 2002, the United States reclaimed the trophy with a 2–1 win over defending champions Korea DPR. The Golden Ball and the Golden Shoe went to Sydney Leroux of the United States. The 2010 edition of the tournament was held in Germany from 13 July to 1 August 2010. The host nation defeated Nigeria in the final to claim its second championship. It was the first time that an African nation had advanced as far as the semifinals. It was also the first tournament in which four different confederations were represented in the semifinals. The Golden Ball and Golden Shoe awards both went to Alexandra Popp of Germany.

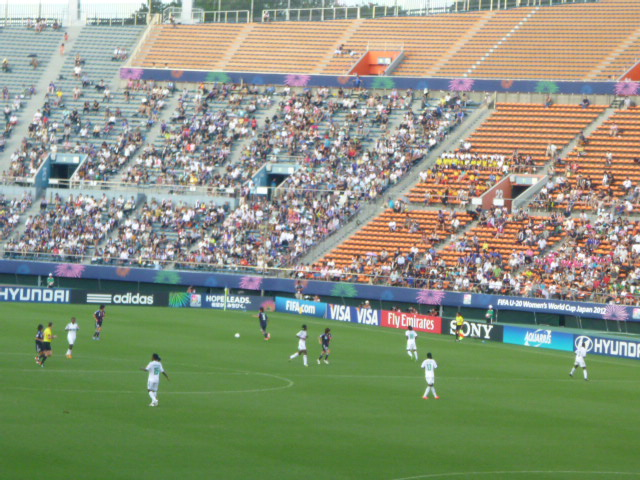
Third-place match between Japan and Nigeria at the 2012 edition

The 2012 FIFA U-20 Women's World Cup was played in Japan from 19 August to 8 September, after initially having a hosting bid from Vietnam withdrawn and a bid from Uzbekistan rejected. The Golden Ball went to Dzsenifer Marozsán of Germany, while the Golden Shoe went to Kim Un-hwa of North Korea. The 2014 FIFA U-20 Women's World Cup was held in Canada from 5–25 August 2014, who reprised its role as host after a Zimbabwean bid withdrew leaving the Canadian bid unopposed. The Golden Ball and Golden Shoe awards both went to Asisat Oshoala of Nigeria.

The 2016 FIFA U-20 Women's World Cup was expected to be held in South Africa, but due to the country's withdrawal, a new host was chosen on 19 March 2015, and it was Papua New Guinea. The 2018 FIFA U-20 Women's World Cup was held in France from 5–24 August 2018; a year later France would host the 2019 FIFA Women's World Cup. The Golden Ball and Golden Shoe awards both went to Patricia Guijarro of Spain.

The 2020 edition was initially to be hosted jointly by Costa Rica and Panama in August 2020. Due to the COVID-19 pandemic it has been postponed to January 2021, to be solely hosted by Costa Rica. Due to having the highest COVID-19 cases and deaths in the region, Panama withdrew from hosting this event along with the 2022 Central American and Caribbean Games. The tournament was initially postponed to 2021, subject to further monitoring. On 17 November 2020, FIFA announced that the 2020 edition of the tournament would be cancelled. Following the cancellation of the 2020 edition, Costa Rica were appointed as hosts of the tournament in 2022.

In 2024 the tournament expanded from 16 to 24 teams. Colombia was selected as host on 23 June 2023. Poland was selected as host on 17 December 2023.

== Results ==
Tournament name

- 2002–2004: "FIFA U-19 Women's World Championship"
- 2006: "FIFA U-20 Women's World Championship"
- 2008–present: "FIFA U-20 Women's World Cup"

Keys

- aet: after extra time
- p: penalty shoot-out

Ed.	Year	Host	Final			Third place game			Num. teams
Ed.	Year	Host	(gold) Champions	Score	(silver) Runners-up	(bronze) Third place	Score	Fourth place	Num. teams
1	2002	Canada	United States	1–0 (g.g.)	Canada	Germany	1–1 (4–3 p)	Brazil	12
2	2004	Thailand	Germany	2–0	China	United States	3–0	Brazil	12
3	2006	Russia	North Korea	5–0	China	Brazil	0–0 (a.e.t.) (6–5 p)	United States	16
4	2008	Chile	United States	2–1	North Korea	Germany	5–3	France	16
5	2010	Germany	Germany	2–0	Nigeria	South Korea	1–0	Colombia	16
6	2012	Japan	United States	1–0	Germany	Japan	2–1	Nigeria	16
7	2014	Canada	Germany	1–0 (a.e.t.)	Nigeria	France	3–2	North Korea	16
8	2016	Papua New Guinea	North Korea	3–1	France	Japan	1–0	United States	16
9	2018	France	Japan	3–1	Spain	England	1–1 (4–2 p)	France	16
10	2022	Costa Rica	Spain	3–1	Japan	Brazil	4–1	Netherlands	16
11	2024	Colombia	North Korea	1–0	Japan	United States	2–1 (a.e.t.)	Netherlands	24
12	2026	Poland	Spain	0–0 (a.e.t.) (4–3 p)	North Korea	Colombia	1–1 (a.e.t.) (4–3 p)	Italy	24
13	2028	TBD		TBD			–		24
14	2030	TBD		TBD			–		24

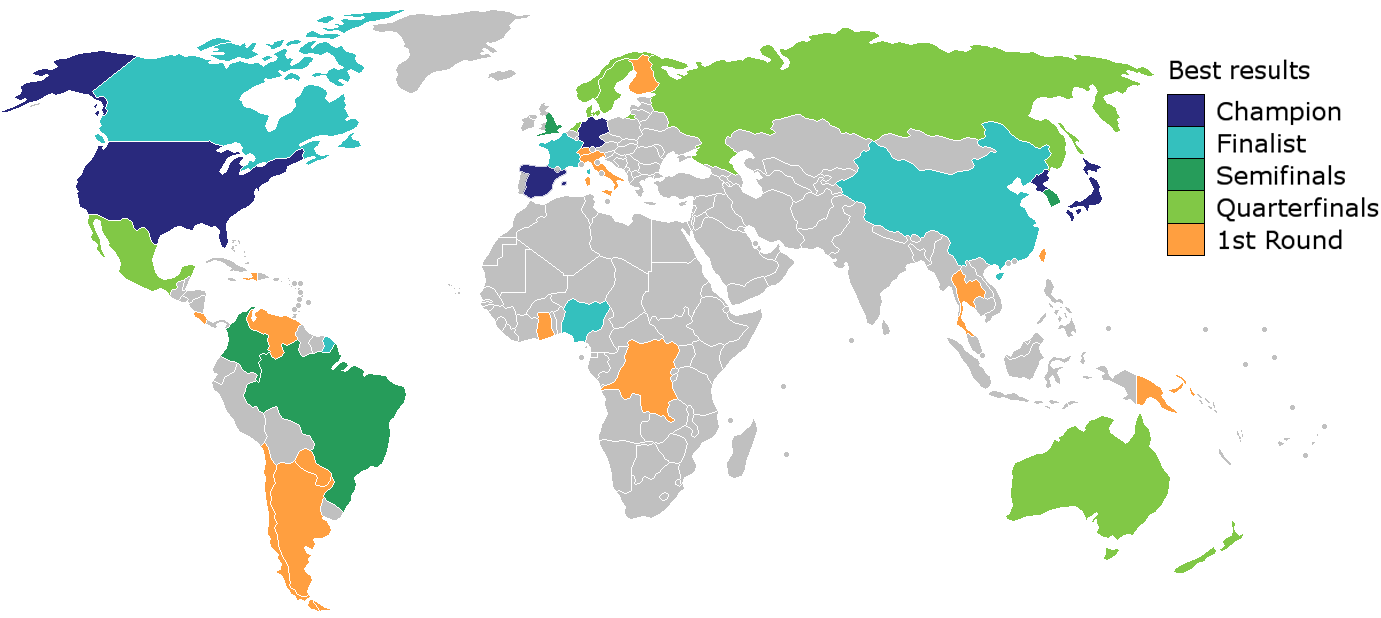
Map of countries' best results

== Debut of national teams ==
Year	Debuting teams		
Year	Teams	No.	Cum.
2002	Australia, Brazil, Canada, Chinese Taipei, Denmark, England, France, Germany, Japan, Mexico, Nigeria, United States	12	12
2004	China, Italy, Russia, South Korea, Spain, Thailand	6	18
2006	Argentina, DR Congo, Finland, New Zealand, North Korea, Switzerland	6	24
2008	Chile, Norway	2	26
2010	Colombia, Costa Rica, Ghana, Sweden	4	30
2012	None	0	30
2014	Paraguay	1	31
2016	Papua New Guinea, Venezuela	2	33
2018	Haiti, Netherlands	2	35
2022	None	0	35
2024	Austria, Cameroon, Fiji, Morocco	4	39
2026	Benin, Ecuador, New Caledonia, Poland, Portugal, Tanzania	6	45

== Teams reaching the top four ==
Team	Titles	Runners-up	Third place	Fourth place
United States	3 (2002, 2008, 2012)	—	2 (2004, 2024)	2 (2006, 2016)
Germany	3 (2004, 2010, 2014)	1 (2012)	2 (2002, 2008)	—
North Korea	3 (2006, 2016, 2024)	2 (2008, 2026)	—	1 (2014)
Spain	2 (2022, 2026)	1 (2018)	—	—
Japan	1 (2018)	2 (2022, 2024)	2 (2012, 2016)	—
China	—	2 (2004, 2006)	—	—
Nigeria	—	2 (2010, 2014)	—	1 (2012)
Canada	—	1 (2002)	—	—
France	—	1 (2016)	1 (2014)	2 (2008, 2018)
Brazil	—	—	2 (2006, 2022)	2 (2002, 2004)
Colombia	—	—	1 (2026)	1 (2010)
South Korea	—	—	1 (2010)	—
England	—	—	1 (2018)	—
Netherlands	—	—	—	2 (2022, 2024)
Italy	—	—	—	1 (2026)

== Comprehensive team results by tournament ==
Legend

- 1st — Champions
- 2nd — Runners-up
- 3rd — Third place
- 4th — Fourth place
- QF – Quarter-finals
- R2 – Round 2 (since 2024: knockout round of 16)
- R1 – Round 1 (group stage)
- • — Did not qualify
- × — Did not enter / Withdrew / To be determined
- XX — Country did not exist or national team was inactive
- — Hosts
- Q – Qualified for upcoming tournament

For each tournament, the flag of the host country and the number of teams in each finals tournament (in brackets) are shown.

Team	Confederation	2002 (Canada) (12)	2004 (Thailand) (12)	2006 (Russia) (16)	2008 (Chile) (16)	2010 (Germany) (16)	2012 (Japan) (16)	2014 (Canada) (16)	2016 (Papua New Guinea) (16)	2018 (France) (16)	2022 (Costa Rica) (16)	2024 (Colombia) (24)	2026 (Poland) (24)	Total
Argentina	CONMEBOL	•	•	R1	R1	•	R1	•	•	•	•	R2	R2	5
Australia	AFC (Note: Australia represented OFC before 2006.)	QF	QF	R1	•	•	•	•	•	•	R1	R1	•	5
Austria	UEFA	•	•	•	•	•	•	•	•	•	•	R2	•	1
Benin	CAF	•	•	•	•	•	•	•	•	•	•	•	R1	1
Brazil	CONMEBOL	4th	4th	3rd	QF	R1	R1	R1	QF	R1	3rd	QF	QF	12
Cameroon	CAF	×	×	•	•	×	•	×	•	•	•	R2	•	1
Canada	CONCACAF	2nd	QF	R1	R1	•	R1	QF	R1	•	R1	R2	QF	10
Chile	CONMEBOL	•	•	•	R1	•	•	•	•	•	•	•	•	1
China	AFC	•	2nd	2nd	R1	•	R1	R1	•	R1	•	•	R2	7
Chinese Taipei	AFC	R1	•	•	•	•	•	•	•	•	•	•	•	1
Colombia	CONMEBOL	•	•	•	•	4th	•	•	•	•	QF	QF	3rd	4
Costa Rica	CONCACAF	•	•	•	•	R1	•	R1	•	•	R1	R1	R1	5
Denmark	UEFA	QF	•	•	•	•	•	•	•	•	•	•	•	1
DR Congo	CAF	×	•	R1	R1	•	•	×	•	×	•	•	•	2
Ecuador	CONMEBOL	•	•	•	•	•	•	•	•	•	•	•	R1	1
England	UEFA	QF	•	•	QF	R1	•	R1	•	3rd	•	•	R2	6
Fiji	OFC	•	×	•	×	×	×	×	×	•	•	R1	•	1
Finland	UEFA	•	•	R1	•	•	•	R1	•	•	•	•	•	2
France	UEFA	R1	•	QF	4th	R1	•	3rd	2nd	4th	QF	R2	R2	10
Germany	UEFA	3rd	1st	QF	3rd	1st	2nd	1st	QF	QF	R1	QF	•	11
Ghana	CAF	×	×	•	•	R1	R1	R1	R1	R1	R1	R1	R1	8
Haiti	CONCACAF	•	×	•	•	×	•	×	•	R1	•	×	•	1
Italy	UEFA	•	R1	•	•	•	R1	•	•	•	•	•	4th	3
Japan	AFC	QF	•	•	QF	R1	3rd	•	3rd	1st	2nd	2nd	R2	9
Mexico	CONCACAF	R1	•	R1	R1	QF	QF	R1	QF	R1	QF	R2	R1	11
Morocco	CAF	•	•	•	×	×	•	•	×	•	•	R1	•	1
Netherlands	UEFA	•	•	•	•	•	•	•	•	QF	4th	4th	•	3
New Caledonia	OFC	×	×	•	•	×	•	×	•	•	•	•	R1	1
New Zealand	OFC	•	×	R1	R1	R1	R1	QF	R1	R1	R1	R1	R1	10
Nigeria	CAF	R1	QF	QF	QF	2nd	4th	2nd	R1	QF	QF	R2	QF	12
North Korea	AFC	•	•	1st	2nd	QF	QF	4th	1st	QF	×	1st	2nd	9
Norway	UEFA	•	•	•	R1	•	QF	•	•	•	•	•	•	2
Papua New Guinea	OFC	×	•	•	×	×	•	•	R1	•	•	•	×	1
Team	Confederation	2002 (Canada) (12)	2004 (Thailand) (12)	2006 (Russia) (16)	2008 (Chile) (16)	2010 (Germany) (16)	2012 (Japan) (16)	2014 (Canada) (16)	2016 (Papua New Guinea) (16)	2018 (France) (16)	2022 (Costa Rica) (16)	2024 (Colombia) (24)	2026 (Poland) (24)	Total
Paraguay	CONMEBOL	•	•	•	•	•	•	R1	•	R1	•	R1	•	3
Poland	UEFA	•	•	•	•	•	•	•	•	•	•	•	R2	1
Portugal	UEFA	•	•	•	•	•	•	•	•	•	•	•	R2	1
Russia	UEFA	•	QF	QF	•	•	•	•	•	•	•	×	×	2
South Korea	AFC	•	R1	•	•	3rd	QF	QF	R1	•	R1	R2	QF	8
Spain	UEFA	•	R1	•	•	•	•	•	QF	2nd	1st	QF	1st	6
Sweden	UEFA	•	•	•	•	QF	•	•	R1	•	•	•	•	2
Switzerland	UEFA	•	•	R1	•	R1	R1	•	•	•	•	•	•	3
Tanzania	CAF	•	•	•	•	•	•	•	•	•	•	•	R1	1
Thailand	AFC	•	R1	•	•	•	•	•	•	•	•	•	•	1
United States	CONCACAF	1st	3rd	4th	1st	QF	1st	QF	4th	R1	R1	3rd	R2	12
Venezuela	CONMEBOL	•	•	•	•	•	•	•	R1	•	•	R1	•	2
Team	Confederation	2002 (Canada) (12)	2004 (Thailand) (12)	2006 (Russia) (16)	2008 (Chile) (16)	2010 (Germany) (16)	2012 (Japan) (16)	2014 (Canada) (16)	2016 (Papua New Guinea) (16)	2018 (France) (16)	2022 (Costa Rica) (16)	2024 (Colombia) (24)	2026 (Poland) (24)	Total

== Results by confederation ==
— Hosts are from this confederation

=== Overview ===
Confederation	1st	2nd	3rd	4th	Top 8	Top 16
UEFA	5	3	4	5	33	11
AFC	4	6	3	1	22	7
CONCACAF	3	1	2	2	17	5
CAF	0	2	0	1	9	3
CONMEBOL	0	0	3	3	12	6
OFC	0	0	0	0	3	0

=== AFC ===
	2002 (Canada) (12)	2004 (Thailand) (12)	2006 (Russia) (16)	2008 (Chile) (16)	2010 (Germany) (16)	2012 (Japan) (16)	2014 (Canada) (16)	2016 (Papua New Guinea) (16)	2018 (France) (16)	2022 (Costa Rica) (16)	2024 (Colombia) (24)	2026 (Poland) (24)	Total
Teams	2	3	3	3	3	4	3	3	3	3	4	4	38
Top 16	—	—	—	—	—	—	—	—	—	—	3	4	7
Top 8	1	1	2	2	2	3	2	2	2	1	2	2	22
Top 4	0	1	2	1	1	1	1	2	1	1	2	1	14
Top 2	0	1	2	1	0	0	0	1	1	1	2	1	10
1st			(North Korea)					(North Korea)	(Japan)		(North Korea)		4
2nd		(China)	(China)	(North Korea)						(Japan)	(Japan)	(North Korea)	6
3rd					(South Korea)	(Japan)		(Japan)					3
4th							(North Korea)						1

=== CAF ===
	2002 (Canada) (12)	2004 (Thailand) (12)	2006 (Russia) (16)	2008 (Chile) (16)	2010 (Germany) (16)	2012 (Japan) (16)	2014 (Canada) (16)	2016 (Papua New Guinea) (16)	2018 (France) (16)	2022 (Costa Rica) (16)	2024 (Colombia) (24)	2026 (Poland) (24)	Total
Teams	1	1	2	2	2	2	2	2	2	2	4	4	26
Top 16	—	—	—	—	—	—	—	—	—	—	2	1	3
Top 8	0	1	1	1	1	1	1	0	1	1	0	1	9
Top 4	0	0	0	0	1	1	1	0	0	0	0	0	3
Top 2	0	0	0	0	1	0	1	0	0	0	0	0	2
1st													0
2nd					(Nigeria)		(Nigeria)						2
3rd													0
4th						(Nigeria)							1

=== CONCACAF ===
	2002 (Canada) (12)	2004 (Thailand) (12)	2006 (Russia) (16)	2008 (Chile) (16)	2010 (Germany) (16)	2012 (Japan) (16)	2014 (Canada) (16)	2016 (Papua New Guinea) (16)	2018 (France) (16)	2022 (Costa Rica) (16)	2024 (Colombia) (24)	2026 (Poland) (24)	Total
Teams	3	2	3	3	3	3	4	3	3	4	4	4	39
Top 16	—	—	—	—	—	—	—	—	—	—	3	2	5
Top 8	2	2	1	1	2	2	2	2	0	1	1	1	17
Top 4	2	1	1	1	0	1	0	1	0	0	1	0	8
Top 2	2	0	0	1	0	1	0	0	0	0	0	0	4
1st	(United States)			(United States)		(United States)							3
2nd	(Canada)												1
3rd		(United States)									(United States)		2
4th			(United States)					(United States)					2

=== CONMEBOL ===
	2002 (Canada) (12)	2004 (Thailand) (12)	2006 (Russia) (16)	2008 (Chile) (16)	2010 (Germany) (16)	2012 (Japan) (16)	2014 (Canada) (16)	2016 (Papua New Guinea) (16)	2018 (France) (16)	2022 (Costa Rica) (16)	2024 (Colombia) (24)	2026 (Poland) (24)	Total
Teams	1	1	2	3	2	2	2	2	2	2	5	4	28
Top 16	—	—	—	—	—	—	—	—	—	—	3	3	6
Top 8	1	1	1	1	1	0	0	1	0	2	2	2	12
Top 4	1	1	1	0	1	0	0	0	0	1	0	1	6
Top 2	0	0	0	0	0	0	0	0	0	0	0	0	0
1st													0
2nd													0
3rd			(Brazil)							(Brazil)		(Colombia)	3
4th	(Brazil)	(Brazil)			(Colombia)								3

=== OFC ===
	2002 (Canada) (12)	2004 (Thailand) (12)	2006 (Russia) (16)	2008 (Chile) (16)	2010 (Germany) (16)	2012 (Japan) (16)	2014 (Canada) (16)	2016 (Papua New Guinea) (16)	2018 (France) (16)	2022 (Costa Rica) (16)	2024 (Colombia) (24)	2026 (Poland) (24)	Total
Teams	1	1	1	1	1	1	1	2	1	1	2	2	15
Top 16	—	—	—	—	—	—	—	—	—	—	0	0	0
Top 8	1	1	0	0	0	0	1	0	0	0	0	0	3
Top 4	0	0	0	0	0	0	0	0	0	0	0	0	0
Top 2	0	0	0	0	0	0	0	0	0	0	0	0	0
1st													0
2nd													0
3rd													0
4th													0

=== UEFA ===
	2002 (Canada) (12)	2004 (Thailand) (12)	2006 (Russia) (16)	2008 (Chile) (16)	2010 (Germany) (16)	2012 (Japan) (16)	2014 (Canada) (16)	2016 (Papua New Guinea) (16)	2018 (France) (16)	2022 (Costa Rica) (16)	2024 (Colombia) (24)	2026 (Poland) (24)	Total
Teams	4	4	5	4	5	4	4	4	5	4	5	6	54
Top 16	—	—	—	—	—	—	—	—	—	—	5	6	11
Top 8	3	2	3	3	2	2	2	3	5	3	3	2	33
Top 4	1	1	0	2	1	1	2	1	3	2	1	2	17
Top 2	0	1	0	0	1	1	1	1	1	1	0	1	8
1st		(Germany)			(Germany)		(Germany)			(Spain)		(Spain)	5
2nd						(Germany)		(France)	(Spain)				3
3rd	(Germany)			(Germany)			(France)		(England)				4
4th				(France)					(France)	(Netherlands)	(Netherlands)	(Italy)	5

== Awards ==
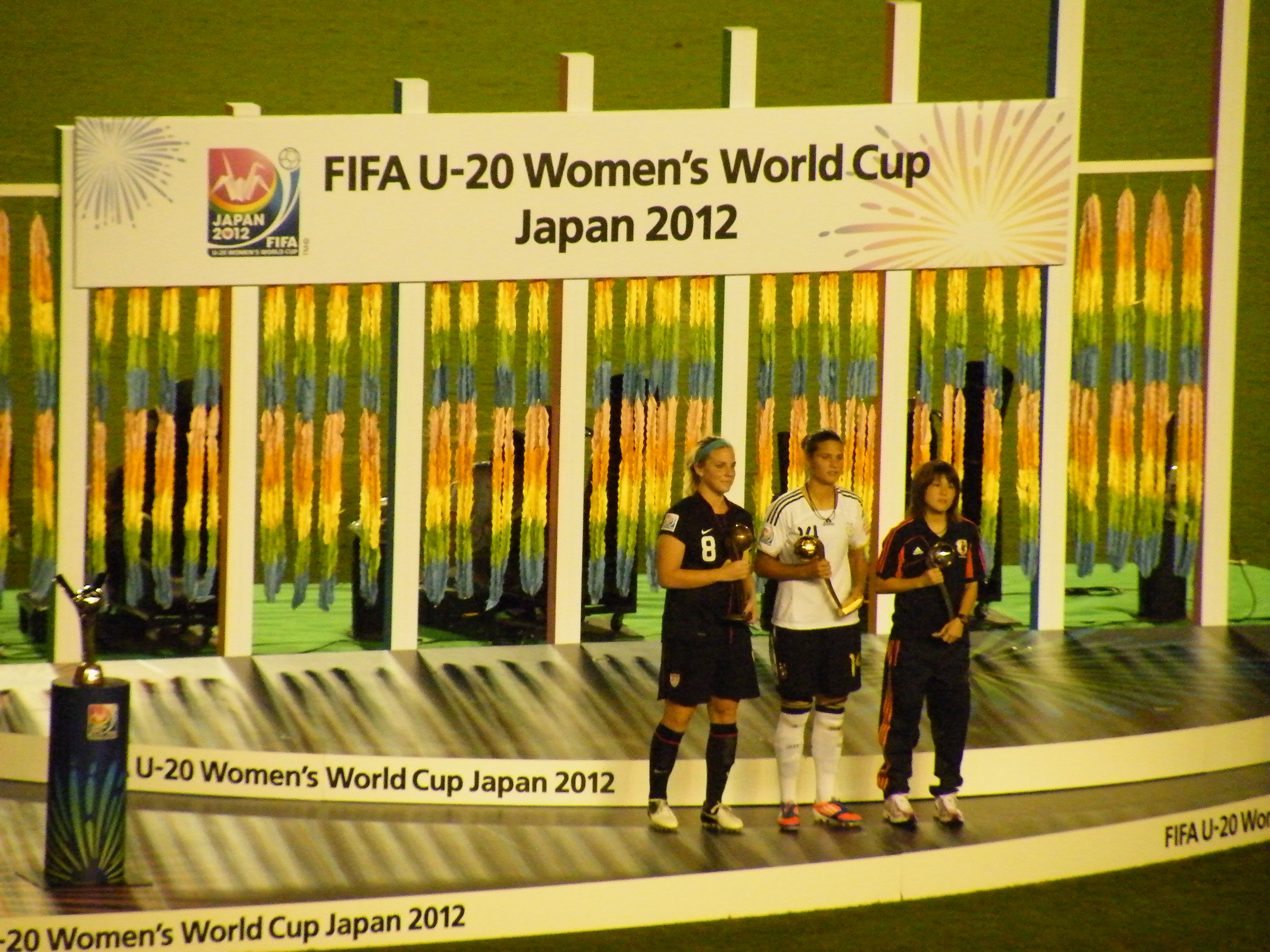
Julie Johnston, Dzsenifer Marozsán and Hanae Shibata with their awards at the 2012 edition.

Below are the award winners.

Golden Ball

Awarded to the best player of the tournament.

Tournament	Winner
2002 Canada	(Canada) Christine Sinclair
2004 Thailand	(Brazil) Marta
2006 Russia	(China) Ma Xiaoxu
2008 Chile	(United States) Sydney Leroux
2010 Germany	(Germany) Alexandra Popp
2012 Japan	(Germany) Dzsenifer Marozsán
2014 Canada	(Nigeria) Asisat Oshoala
2016 Papua New Guinea	(Japan) Hina Sugita
2018 France	(Spain) Patricia Guijarro
2022 Costa Rica	(Japan) Maika Hamano
2024 Colombia	(North Korea) Choe Il-son
2026 Poland	(Spain) Rosalía Domínguez

Golden Boot

The top goalscorer award.

Tournament	Winner	Goals
2002 Canada	(Canada) Christine Sinclair	11
2004 Thailand	(Canada) Brittany Timko	7
2006 Russia	(China) Ma Xiaoxu	5
2008 Chile	(United States) Sydney Leroux	5
2010 Germany	(Germany) Alexandra Popp	10
2012 Japan	(North Korea) Kim Un-hwa	7
2014 Canada	(Nigeria) Asisat Oshoala	7
2016 Papua New Guinea	(Japan) Mami Ueno	5
2018 France	(Spain) Patricia Guijarro	6
2022 Costa Rica	(Spain) Inma Gabarro	8
2024 Colombia	(North Korea) Choe Il-son	6
2026 Poland	(Spain) Pau Comendador	6

Golden Glove

Awarded to the best goalkeeper.

Tournament	Winner
2008 Chile	(United States) Alyssa Naeher
2010 Germany	(United States) Bianca Henninger
2012 Japan	(Germany) Laura Benkarth
2014 Canada	(Germany) Meike Kämper
2016 Papua New Guinea	(France) Mylène Chavas
2018 France	(England) Sandy MacIver
2022 Costa Rica	(Spain) Txell Font
2024 Colombia	(Netherlands) Femke Liefting
2026 Poland	(Spain) Laia López

FIFA Fair Play Trophy

Tournament	Winner
2002 Canada	Japan
2004 Thailand	United States
2006 Russia	North Korea; Russia (Note: The archived FIFA page for the 2006 event identifies a single winner, Russia. The November 2006 FIFA magazine and the Official event's Report and Statistics document identify two winners. According to FIFA Committee for Fair Play and Social Responsibility two teams won the Fair Play award after having the same points in all criteria.)
2008 Chile	United States
2010 Germany	South Korea
2012 Japan	Japan
2014 Canada	Canada
2016 Papua New Guinea	Japan
2018 France	Japan
2022 Costa Rica	Japan
2024 Colombia	Japan
2026 Poland	United States

Goal of the Tournament

Awarded to the best goal.

Tournament	Winner	Scored against
2008 Chile	(United States) Alex Morgan	North Korea
2010 Germany	(Colombia) Yoreli Rincón	Sweden
2012 Japan	(Mexico) Olivia Jiménez	Switzerland
2014 Canada	(Finland) Sini Laaksonen	North Korea
2016 Papua New Guinea	(Spain) Mariona Caldentey	Canada
2018 France	(Mexico) Jacqueline Ovalle	Brazil
2026 Poland	(Benin) Romaine Gandonou	Poland

== See also ==
- FIFA Women's World Cup
- FIFA U-17 Women's World Cup
- FIFA U-20 World Cup
