= Stephanie Skilton =

New Zealand footballer

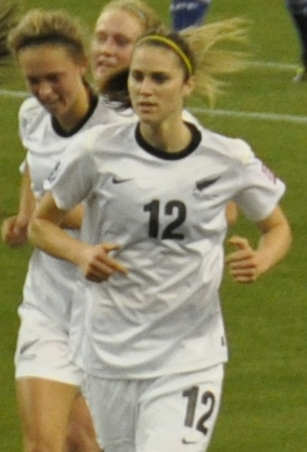
- Stephanie Skilton in August 2014

Personal information
- Full name: Stephanie Skilton
- Date of birth: 27 October 1994 (age 32)
- Place of birth: Auckland, New Zealand
- Height: 1.75 m (5 ft 9 in)
- Position: Forward

Team information
- Current team: Papakura City

Youth career
- Three Kings United
- Glenfield Rovers

College career
Years	Team	Apps	(Gls)
2013–2017	Syracuse Orange	75	(27)

Senior career*
Years	Team	Apps	(Gls)
2018-	Papakura City FC		

International career^{‡}
2010	New Zealand U-17	6	(2)
2012	New Zealand U-20	13	(5)
2014–	New Zealand	9	(0)
- * Club domestic league appearances and goals ‡ National team caps and goals as of 29 April 2019

Stephanie Skilton (born 27 October 1994 in Auckland, New Zealand) is an association footballer who plays for Papakura City and has represented New Zealand at international level by being capped in the New Zealand women's national football team.

== College career ==
Skilton played for the Syracuse Orange women's soccer team representing Syracuse University from 2013–2017.

== Career ==
Skilton was a member of the New Zealand U-17 side at the 2010 FIFA U-17 Women's World Cup in Trinidad and Tobago, making two appearances.

She played in all three of New Zealand's games at the 2012 FIFA U-20 Women's World Cup in Japan where they were eliminated at the group stages.

At the 2014 FIFA U-20 Women's World Cup in Canada, Skilton played in all three of New Zealand's group games and the quarter-final match which they lost to Nigeria.

Skilton made her senior début as a substitute in a 1–2 loss to Switzerland on 7 March 2014.
