= Jennifer Mora =

Paraguayan footballer (born 1996)

Personal information
- Full name: Jennifer Magalí Mora Cáceres
- Date of birth: 11 November 1996 (age 30)
- Height: 1.55 m (5 ft 1 in)
- Position: Defender

Senior career*
Years	Team	Apps	(Gls)
- Cerro Porteño

International career^{‡}
2014	Paraguay U20	3	(1)
2014	Paraguay	4	(0)
- * Club domestic league appearances and goals ‡ National team caps and goals as of 20 September 2014

Jennifer Magalí Mora Cáceres (born 11 November 1996) is a Paraguayan footballer who plays as a defender. She has been a member of the Paraguay women's national team and the national under-20 team.

== International career ==
Mora represented Paraguay at the 2014 FIFA U-20 Women's World Cup. At senior level, she played the 2014 Copa América Femenina.
