= 2013 UEFA Women's Under-19 Championship =

Tournament details
- Host country: Wales
- Dates: 19–31 August
- Teams: 8
- Venue: 4 (in 3 host cities)

Final positions
- Champions: France (3rd title)
- Runners-up: England

Tournament statistics
- Matches played: 15
- Goals scored: 40 (2.67 per match)
- Attendance: 7,798 (520 per match)
- Top scorer(s): (Germany) Pauline Bremer (6 goals)
- Best player: (France) Sandie Toletti

The UEFA Women's U-19 Championship 2013 Final Tournament was held in Wales between 19 and 31 August 2013. Players born after 1 January 1994 were eligible to participate in this competition.

It was the first time Wales played in the final tournament. The tournament also qualified four teams to the 2014 FIFA U-20 Women's World Cup, with England, Finland, France and Germany claiming Europe's four places by reaching the semi-finals.

== Tournament structure ==
The regulations make up for the following tournament structure:

	Teams entering in this round	Teams advancing from previous round	Competition format
First qualifying round (40 teams)	40 teams from associations ranked 4–53		10 groups of 4 teams, hosted by one nation, seeded into four pots by UEFA coefficient
Second qualifying round (24 teams)	Germany (ranked 1); France (ranked 2); England (ranked 3)	10 group winners and runners-up from 1st qualifying round; best group third-place finisher from 1st qualifying round	6 groups of 4 teams, hosted by one nation, seeded into four pots by UEFA coefficient
Final tournament (8 teams)	Wales (hosts)	6 group winners from 2nd qualifying round; best group runners-up from 2nd qualifying round	2 groups of 4 teams, semi-finals, final The four semifinalists qualify for the 2014 FIFA U-20 Women's World Cup

== Venues ==
Venues map
- Parc y Scarlets, Llanelli (capacity 14,870)
- Bridge Meadow Stadium, Haverfordwest (2,000)
- Stebonheath Park, Llanelli (1,005)
- Richmond Park, Carmarthen (1,000)

== Qualifications ==
There were two separate rounds of qualifications held before the Final Tournament.

=== First qualifying round ===
In the first qualifying round 40 teams were drawn into 10 groups. The top two of each group and the best third-place finisher, counting only matches against the top two in the group, advanced. The draw for this round was made on 15 November 2011.

=== Second qualifying round ===
In the second round the 21 teams from the first qualifying round were joined by top seeds Germany, France and England. The 24 teams of this round were drawn into six groups of four teams. The group winners and the runners-up team with the best record against the sides first and third in their group advanced to the final tournament.

== Match officials ==
UEFA named six referees and eight assistant referees to officiate matches at the final tournament. Additionally, two referees from the host nation were chosen as fourth officials.

Referees

- Olga Zadinová (Czech Republic)
- Eleni Lampadariou (Greece)
- Eszter Urbán (Hungary)
- Monika Mularczyk (Poland)
- Petra Chudá (Slovakia)
- Dilan Deniz Gökçek (Turkey)

Assistant referees

- Araksya Saribekyan (Armenia)
- Cindy Zeferino de Oliveira (Austria)
- Sanja Rodjak Karšić (Croatia)
- Giuliana Guarino (Italy)
- Yana Mazanova (Russia)
- Svetlana Bilić (Serbia)
- Rocío Puente Pino (Spain)
- Belinda Brem (Switzerland)

Fourth officials

- (Republic of Ireland) Paula Brady (Ireland)
- Lorraine Clark (Scotland)

== Group stage ==
The 7 teams advancing from the second qualifying round were joined by host nation Wales. The eight teams were drawn into two groups of four with the top two teams of each group advancing to the semifinals. The draw for the final tournament took place at Parc y Scarlets in Llanelli on 7 May 2013.

All kick-off times are local (WEST)

=== Group A ===
Team	Pld	W	D	L	GF	GA	GD	Pts
England	3	2	1	0	6	0	+6	7
France	3	2	1	0	6	1	+5	7
Denmark	3	1	0	2	2	6	−4	3
Wales	3	0	0	3	0	7	−7	0

19 August 2013
14:00

Wales	0–1	Denmark
	Report	Frandsen 61'

Parc y Scarlets, Llanelli
Referee: Eleni Lampadariou (Greece)
19 August 2013
19:00

England	0–0	France
	Report

Stebonheath Park, Llanelli
Referee: Monika Mularczyk (Poland)

22 August 2013
14:00

Wales	0–3	England
	Report	Lawley 63'; Parris 83'; Mead 89'

Richmond Park, Carmarthen
Referee: Dilan Deniz Gökçek (Turkey)
22 August 2013
19:00

Denmark	1–3	France
Frandsen 8' (pen.)	Report	Declercq 10'; Toletti 17'; Lavogez 26'

Stebonheath Park, Llanelli
Referee: Eszter Urbán (Hungary)

25 August 2013
15:00

France	3–0	Wales
Toletti 28'; Le Bihan 35', 47'	Report

Bridge Meadow Stadium, Haverfordwest
Referee: Petra Chudá (Slovakia)
25 August 2013
15:00

Denmark	0–3	England
	Report	Williams 34' (pen.); Parris 85'; Zelem 90'

Parc y Scarlets, Llanelli
Referee: Olga Zadinová (Czech Republic)

=== Group B ===
Team	Pld	W	D	L	GF	GA	GD	Pts
Germany	3	2	1	0	8	1	+7	7
Finland	3	1	2	0	3	2	+1	5
Norway	3	1	0	2	5	6	−1	3
Sweden	3	0	1	2	1	8	−7	1

19 August 2013
14:00

Sweden	1–1	Finland
Banušić 4'	Report	Kemppi 60'

Stebonheath Park, Llanelli
Referee: Dilan Deniz Gökçek (Turkey)
19 August 2013
19:00

Germany	5–0	Norway
Dallmann 12', 15'; Bremer 21', 39', 43'	Report

Parc y Scarlets, Llanelli
Referee: Olga Zadinová (Czech Republic)

22 August 2013
14:00

Sweden	0–2	Germany
	Report	Bremer 59', 84'

Bridge Meadow Stadium, Haverfordwest
Referee: Monika Mularczyk (Poland)
22 August 2013
19:00

Finland	1–0	Norway
Engman 78'	Report

Richmond Park, Carmarthen
Referee: Petra Chudá (Slovakia)

25 August 2013
15:00

Norway	5–0	Sweden
Jensen 41', 51'; Eikeland 48'; Tomter 69'; Skinnes Hansen 87'	Report

Stebonheath Park, Llanelli
Referee: Eszter Urban (Hungary)
25 August 2013
15:00

Finland	1–1	Germany
Kemppi 48'	Report	Tietge 20'

Richmond Park, Carmarthen
Referee: Eleni Lampadariou (Greece)

== Knockout round ==
All four teams qualify to the 2014 U20 World Cup.

=== Bracket ===
Semi-finals
28 August – Carmarthen
England	4
Finland	0
28 August – Llanelli
Germany	1
France	2

Final
31 August – Llanelli
England	0
France (a.e.t.)	2

=== Semi-finals ===
28 August 2013
12:30

Germany	1–2	France
Bremer 90+3' (pen.)	Report	Diani 62', 64'

Parc y Scarlets, Llanelli
Referee: Olga Zadinová (Czech Republic)

28 August 2013
19:00

England	4–0	Finland
Mead 15', 40'; Williams 34' (pen.); Sigsworth 66'	Report

Richmond Park, Carmarthen
Referee: Eleni Lampadariou (Greece)

=== Final ===
31 August 2013
15:00

England	0–2 (a.e.t.)	France
	Report	Toletti 95'; Diallo 114'

Parc y Scarlets, Llanelli
Attendance: 1,030
Referee: Monika Mularczyk (Poland)

2013 UEFA Women's U-19 European champions

France
Third title

== Goalscorers ==
6 goals

- (Germany) Pauline Bremer

3 goals

- (England) Bethany Mead
- (France) Sandie Toletti

2 goals

- (Denmark) Nikoline Frandsen
- (England) Nikita Parris
- (England) Paige Williams
- (Finland) Juliette Kemppi
- (France) Kadidiatou Diani
- (France) Clarisse Le Bihan
- (Germany) Linda Dallmann
- (Norway) Synne Jensen

1 goal

- (England) Melissa Lawley
- (England) Jessica Sigsworth
- (England) Katie Zelem
- (Finland) Adelina Engman
- (France) Léa Declercq
- (France) Aminata Diallo
- (France) Claire Lavogez
- (Germany) Johanna Tietge
- (Norway) Amalie Eikeland
- (Norway) Synne Skinnes Hansen
- (Norway) Andrine Tomter
- (Sweden) Marija Banušić
