= Dou Jiaxing =

Chinese association football player

Personal information
- Date of birth: 29 February 2000 (age 26)
- Place of birth: Jiangyin, China
- Height: 1.72 m (5 ft 8 in)
- Position: Defender

Team information
- Current team: Jiangsu

International career
Years	Team	Apps	(Gls)
2023–	China	2	(0)

Dou Jiaxing (Chinese: 窦加星, born 29 February 2000) is a Chinese professional association football player who plays as a defender for Chinese Women's Super League side Jiangsu. Dou Jiaxing was selected for the Chinese national team squad for the 2023 FIFA Women's World Cup.
