= Johanna Tietge =

German footballer (born 1996)

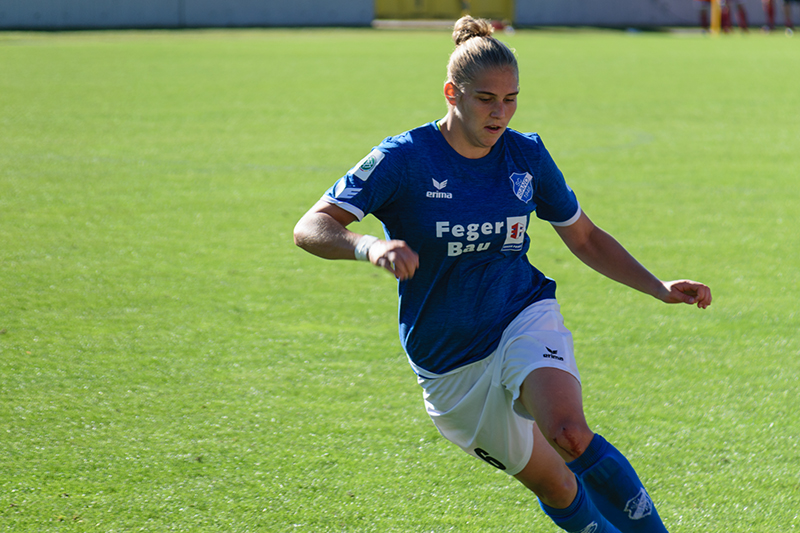

Personal information
- Date of birth: 16 April 1996 (age 30)
- Place of birth: Gifhorn, Germany
- Height: 1.67 m (5 ft 6 in)
- Position: Midfielder

Team information
- Current team: Wolfsburg

Johanna Tietge (born 16 April 1996) is a German footballer who played as a midfielder for Wolfsburg.
