= Theresa Panfil =

German footballer (born 1995)

Personal information
- Date of birth: 13 November 1995 (age 30)
- Place of birth: Fulda, Germany
- Height: 1.58 m (5 ft 2 in)
- Position: Midfielder

Theresa Panfil (born 13 November 1995) is a German former professional footballer who played as a midfielder.
