= Sherifatu Sumaila =

Ghanaian footballer

Personal information
- Date of birth: 30 November 1996 (age 29)
- Place of birth: Tamale, Ghana
- Height: 1.68 m (5 ft 6 in)
- Position: Striker

Team information
- Current team: Rayo Vallecano

College career
Years	Team	Apps	(Gls)
- Feather River Golden Eagles
2017	UMFK Bengals		

Senior career*
Years	Team	Apps	(Gls)
- California Storm
- LA Galaxy OC
2018	Djurgårdens IF	7	(0)
2019	Mallbackens IF	21	(12)
2020–2021	Kiryat Gat	12	(1)
2021–2022	Parquesol	28	(4)
2022–	Rayo Vallecano	0	(0)

International career
2010–2012	Ghana U17		
2014	Ghana U20		
- Ghana
- * Club domestic league appearances and goals as of 28 May 2022

Sherifatu Sumaila (born 30 November 1996) is a Ghanaian professional footballer who plays as an attacking midfielder and a attacker for Spanish Primera Federación club Rayo Vallecano. She previously played for Djurgården. She is also a former player for USA United Women's Soccer side LA Galaxy Orange County. Sherifatu is a member of the Ghana women's national football team, the Black Queens. Sherifatu made her debut for the national U17 squad, Black Maidens, in 2010 to begin representing Ghana.She played a significant role in the Black Maidens team's bronze-winning performance in the 2012 FIFA U17 Women's World Cup.

Since then, Sumaila has played frequently for the Black Princesses and is currently a member of the Black Queens.

== Education ==
Sherifatu graduated from Feather River Community College in Quincy, California.
