= Finland women's national under-20 football team =

National association football team

- Association: Football Association of Finland
- Confederation: UEFA (Europe)
- Head coach: (Finland) Marianne Miettinen
- FIFA code: FIN
First colours	Second colours

First international
- Norway 5–1 Finland (Uppsala, Sweden; 21 August 1990)

Finland women's national under-20 football team represents Finland at the FIFA U-20 Women's World Cup.

== FIFA U-20 Women's World Cup record ==
FIFA U-20 Women's World Cup record
Year	Round	GP	W	D	L	GF	GA
(Canada) 2002	Did not qualify						
(Thailand) 2004	Did not qualify						
(Russia) 2006	Group stage	3	0	0	3	1	12
(Chile) 2008	Did not qualify						
(Germany) 2010	Did not qualify						
(Japan) 2012	Did not qualify						
(Canada) 2014	Group Stage	3	0	0	3	4	7
(Papua New Guinea) 2016	Did not qualify						
(France) 2018	Did not qualify						
(Costa Rica) 2022	Did not qualify						
(Colombia) 2024	Did not qualify						
(Poland) 2026	To be determined						

== Head-to-head record ==
The following table shows Finland's head-to-head record in the FIFA U-20 Women's World Cup.

Opponent	Pld	W	D	L	GF	GA	GD	Win %
Canada	2	0	0	2	2	5	−3	0.00
China	1	0	0	1	1	2	−1	0.00
Ghana	1	0	0	1	1	2	−1	0.00
Nigeria	1	0	0	1	0	8	−8	0.00
North Korea	1	0	0	1	1	2	−1	0.00
Total	6	0	0	6	5	19	−14	0.00

== See also ==
- Finland women's national football team
- Finland women's national under-17 football team
- Women's association football around the world
- Finland men's national football team
