= Meike Kämper =

German association football player

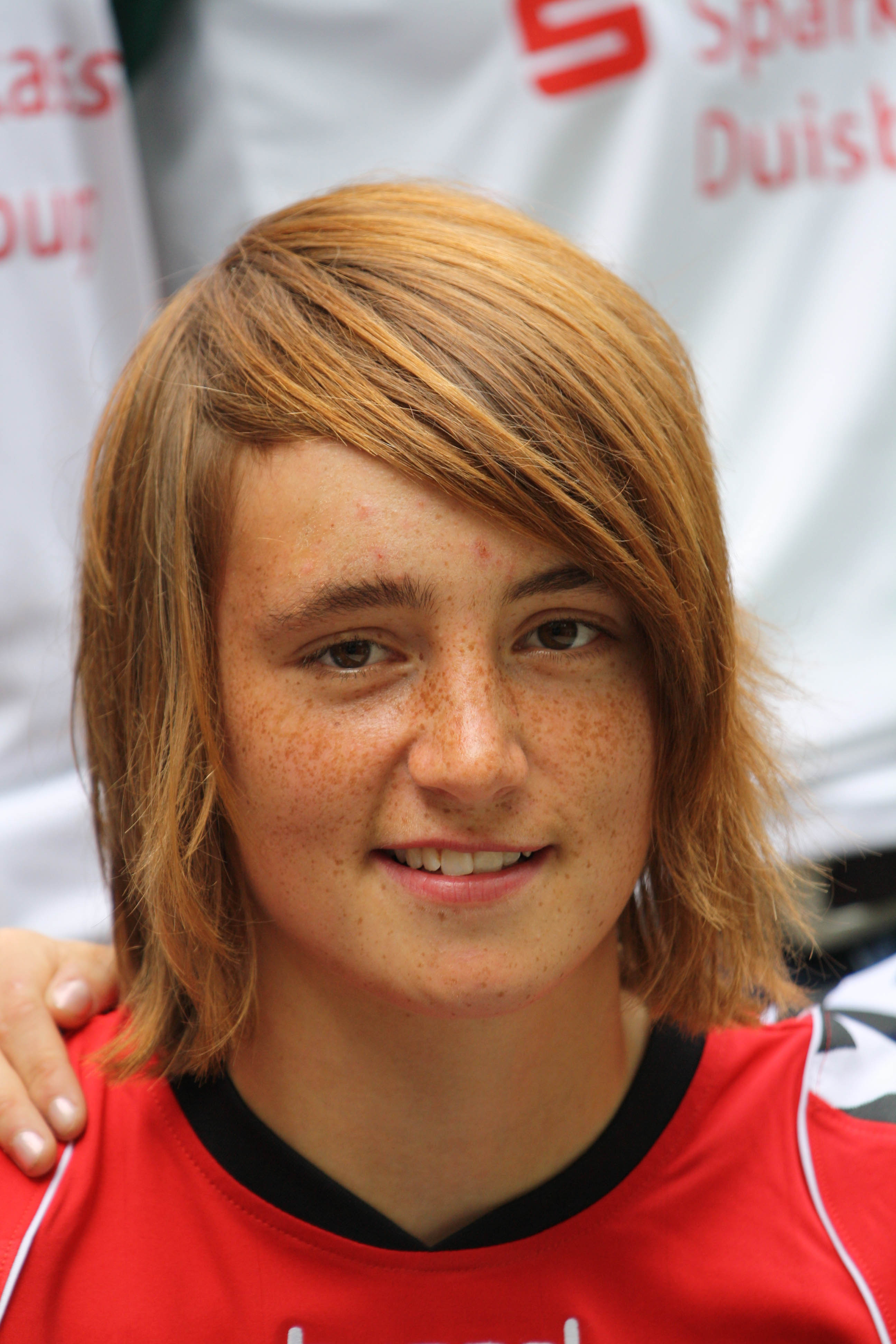

Personal information
- Date of birth: 23 May 1994 (age 32)
- Place of birth: Essen, Germany
- Height: 1.71 m (5 ft 7 in)
- Position: Goalkeeper

Senior career*
Years	Team	Apps	(Gls)
2011–2021	MSV Duisburg	114	(0)
2022	SGS Essen	1	(0)

International career
2008–2009	Germany U15	3	(0)
2010	Germany U16	6	(0)
2011	Germany U17	1	(0)
2011–2013	Germany U19	9	(0)
2014	Germany U20	5	(0)
- * Club domestic league appearances and goals

Meike Kämper (born 23 April 1994) is a German retired professional footballer who played as a goalkeeper for MSV Duisburg and SGS Essen.
