= Léhon =

Léhon Léhon
- Part of Dinan
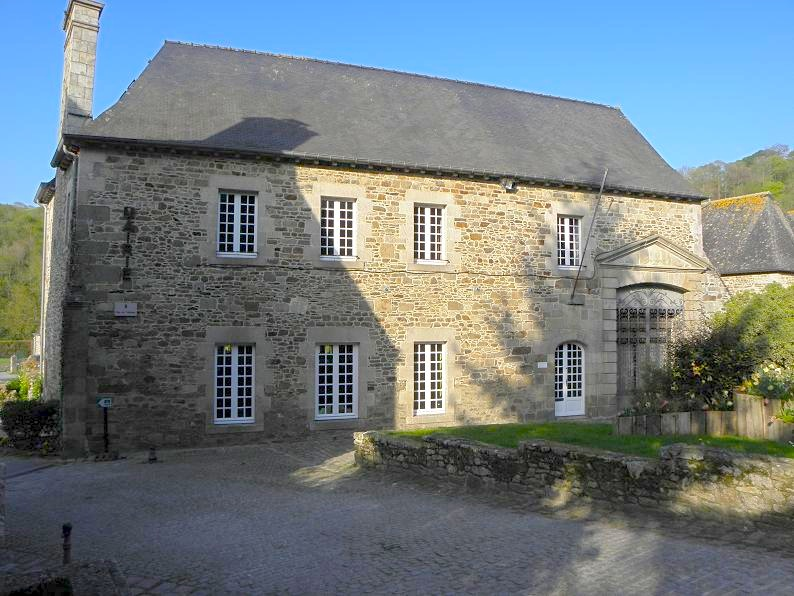
- Town hall

- Coat of arms
- Location of Léhon
- Location within France Location within Brittany
- Coordinates: 48°26′33″N 2°02′18″W
- Country: France
- Region: Brittany
- Department: Côtes-d'Armor
- Arrondissement: Dinan
- Canton: Dinan
- Commune: Dinan
- Area^{1}: 4.73 km^{2} (1.83 sq mi)
- Highest elevation: 132 m (433 ft)
- Lowest elevation: 7 m (23 ft)
- Population (2022): 3,147
  - Density: 665/km^{2} (1,720/sq mi)
- Time zone: UTC+01:00 (CET)
  - Summer (DST): UTC+02:00 (CEST)
- Postal code: 22100
- ^{1} French Land Register data, which excludes lakes, ponds, glaciers > 1 km^{2} (0.386 sq mi or 247 acres) and river estuaries.

Léhon (French pronunciation: [le.ɔ̃]; Breton: Lehon; Gallo: Léon) was a commune in the Côtes-d'Armor department of Brittany in northwestern France. On 1 January 2018, it was merged into the commune of Dinan.

== Population ==
Inhabitants of Léhon were called léhonnais in French.

== Personalities ==
- Almamy Schuman Bah, footballer

== See also ==
- Communes of the Côtes-d'Armor department
