= Turun Palloseura (women's football) =

Finnish women's football team

- Full name: Turun Palloseura Naiset
- Nicknames: Tepsi, Tepsimuijat
- Short name: TPS Naiset
- Founded: 1972
- Ground: Turun Urheilupuiston yläkenttä, Turku
- Capacity: 750
- Coordinates: 60°26′35″N 22°15′57″E
- Chairman: Teppo Virta
- Managers: Päivi Hämäläinen; Tommy Sandås
- Coach: Sami Haltia
- League: Kansallinen Liiga
- 2023: 9th
- Website: https://www.tpsjuniorijalkapallo.fi/joukkueet/7624
colours	colours

Turun Palloseura Naiset, commonly known as TPS Naiset, is a Finnish women's football team based in Turku. They represent Turun Palloseura in the Kansallinen Liiga (previously Naisten Liiga, Naisten SM-sarja), the top division of women's football in Finland. Their home ground is the upper field (Finnish: yläkenttä) of the Turun Urheilupuiston (Turku Sportspark), an artificial turf pitch with seating capacity for 750 spectators.

== History ==
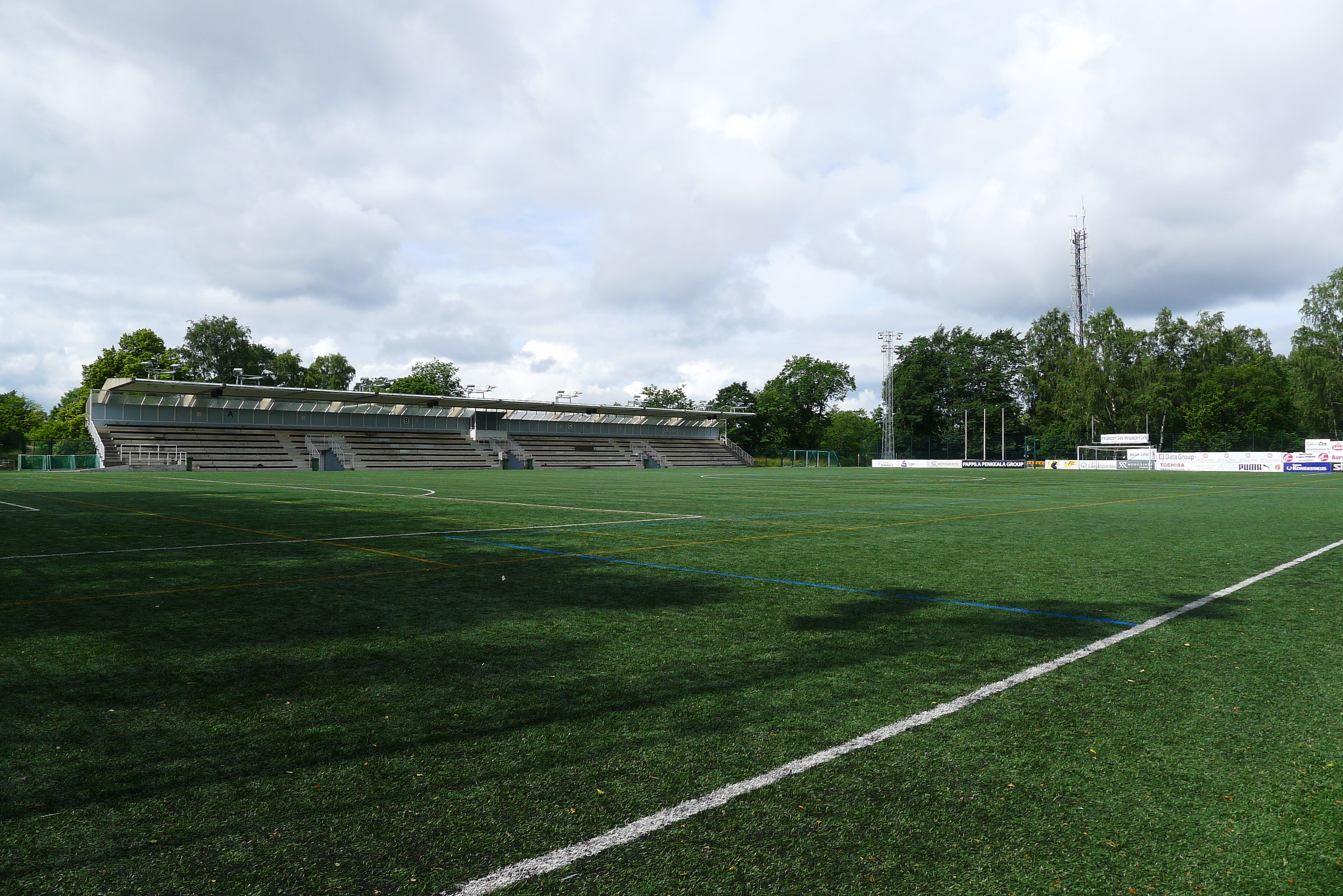
TPS' home ground, Turun Urheilupuiston yläkenttä, in 2015

TPS took part in the national championship for the first time in 1972, and won the title in 1978. After withdrawing from the top league in 1992, they returned in 2008. The 2016 campaign is team’s most successful season since returning to the top league, with TPS earning Finnish Championship silver.

== Honours ==
=== Finnish Championship ===
- (gold) Naisten SM-sarja Champions (1): 1978
- (silver) Runners-up (8):
  - Naisten SM-sarja Runners-up (7): 1974, 1975, 1977, 1979, 1980, 1983, 1984
  - Naisten Liiga Runners-up (1): 2016
- (bronze) Naisten SM-sarja Third Place (2): 1976, 1985
