= 2018 UEFA Women's Under-17 Championship qualification =

Tournament details
- Dates: Qualifying round: 22 September – 29 October 2017; Elite round: 8–31 March 2018
- Teams: 45 (from 1 confederation)

Tournament statistics
- Matches played: 108
- Goals scored: 441 (4.08 per match)
- Top scorer: (Spain) Clàudia Pina (15 goals)

The 2018 UEFA Women's Under-17 Championship qualifying competition was a women's under-17 football competition that determined the seven teams joining the automatically qualified hosts Lithuania in the 2018 UEFA Women's Under-17 Championship final tournament.

Apart from Lithuania, 45 of the remaining 54 UEFA member national teams entered the qualifying competition. Players born on or after 1 January 2001 are eligible to participate. Each match has a duration of 80 minutes, consisting of two halves of 40 minutes with a 15-minute half-time.

== Format ==
The qualifying competition consists of two rounds:

- Qualifying round: Apart from Germany, which receive a bye to the elite round as the team with the highest seeding coefficient, the remaining 44 teams are drawn into 11 groups of four teams. Each group is played in single round-robin format at one of the teams selected as hosts after the draw. The 11 group winners, the 11 runners-up, and the five third-placed teams with the best record against the first and second-placed teams in their group advance to the elite round.
- Elite round: The 28 teams are drawn into seven groups of four teams. Each group is played in single round-robin format at one of the teams selected as hosts after the draw. The seven group winners qualify for the final tournament.

Initially the elite round would consist of 24 teams, drawn into six groups of four teams, with the six group winners and the runner-up with the best record against the first and third-placed teams in their group qualifying for the final tournament. After the qualifying round draw was held, UEFA decided to expand the elite round from 24 to 28 teams, allowing four more third-placed teams to advance to the elite round.

The schedule of each mini-tournament is as follows (Regulations Article 20.04):

Matchday	Matches
Matchday 1	1 v 4, 3 v 2
Rest days (2 days)	—
Matchday 2	1 v 3, 2 v 4
Rest days (2 days)	—
Matchday 3	2 v 1, 4 v 3

=== Tiebreakers ===
In the qualifying round and elite round, teams are ranked according to points (3 points for a win, 1 point for a draw, 0 points for a loss), and if tied on points, the following tiebreaking criteria are applied, in the order given, to determine the rankings (Regulations Articles 14.01 and 14.02):

1. Points in head-to-head matches among tied teams;
2. Goal difference in head-to-head matches among tied teams;
3. Goals scored in head-to-head matches among tied teams;
4. If more than two teams are tied, and after applying all head-to-head criteria above, a subset of teams are still tied, all head-to-head criteria above are reapplied exclusively to this subset of teams;
5. Goal difference in all group matches;
6. Goals scored in all group matches;
7. Penalty shoot-out if only two teams have the same number of points, and they met in the last round of the group and are tied after applying all criteria above (not used if more than two teams have the same number of points, or if their rankings are not relevant for qualification for the next stage);
8. Disciplinary points (red card = 3 points, yellow card = 1 point, expulsion for two yellow cards in one match = 3 points);
9. UEFA coefficient for the qualifying round draw;
10. Drawing of lots.

To determine the five best third-placed teams from the qualifying round, the results against the teams in fourth place are discarded. The following criteria are applied (Regulations Article 15.01):

1. Points;
2. Goal difference;
3. Goals scored;
4. Disciplinary points;
5. UEFA coefficient for the qualifying round draw;
6. Drawing of lots.

== Qualifying round ==
=== Draw ===
The draw for the qualifying round was held on 11 November 2016, 09:10 CET (UTC+1), at the UEFA headquarters in Nyon, Switzerland.

The teams were seeded according to their coefficient ranking, calculated based on the following:

- 2014 UEFA Women's Under-17 Championship final tournament and qualifying competition (qualifying round and elite round)
- 2015 UEFA Women's Under-17 Championship final tournament and qualifying competition (qualifying round and elite round)
- 2016 UEFA Women's Under-17 Championship final tournament and qualifying competition (qualifying round and elite round)

Each group contained one team from Pot A, one team from Pot B, one team from Pot C, and one team from Pot D. For political reasons, Russia and Ukraine would not be drawn in the same group.

Final tournament hosts: Team / Coeff / Rank; **Lithuania** / 0.333 / —	Bye to elite round: Team / Coeff / Rank; **Germany** / 16.667 / 1

Teams entering qualifying round

Pot A
Team	Coeff	Rank
**Spain**	16.000	2
France	12.667	3
Norway	10.000	4
**Italy**	9.833	5
Austria	9.167	6
**England**	9.000	7
Republic of Ireland	8.500	8
Switzerland	8.167	9
Czech Republic	7.833	10
Sweden	7.667	11
Belgium	7.667	12

Pot B
Team	Coeff	Rank
**Finland**	7.333	13
**Netherlands**	7.167	14
Scotland	7.167	15
Denmark	7.000	16
**Poland**	6.500	17
Iceland	6.167	18
Serbia	5.833	19
Russia	5.667	20
Hungary	5.333	21
Greece	4.833	22
Portugal	4.833	23

Pot C
Team	Coeff	Rank
Belarus	4.000	24
Turkey	4.000	25
Northern Ireland	3.833	26
Slovenia	3.333	27
Slovakia	3.167	28
Wales	3.000	29
Bulgaria	3.000	30
Romania	2.833	31
Croatia	2.333	32
Ukraine	2.000	33
Azerbaijan	2.000	34

Pot D
Team	Coeff	Rank
Bosnia and Herzegovina	1.667	35
Macedonia	1.333	36
Montenegro	1.000	37
Latvia	1.000	38
Israel	1.000	39
Kazakhstan	0.333	40
Estonia	0.333	41
Moldova	0.333	42
Faroe Islands	0.000	43
Georgia	0.000	44
Malta	—	45

Notes

- Teams marked in **bold** have qualified for the final tournament.

Did not enter
Albania
Andorra
Armenia
Cyprus
Gibraltar
Kosovo
Liechtenstein
Luxembourg
San Marino

=== Groups ===
The qualifying round must be played between 1 August and 29 October 2017.

Times up to 28 October 2017 are CEST (UTC+2), thereafter times are CET (UTC+1).

==== Group 1 ====
Pos	Team	Pld	W	D	L	GF	GA	GD	Pts	Qualification
1	Poland (H)	3	3	0	0	10	2	+8	**9**	Elite round
2	Switzerland	3	2	0	1	10	2	+8	**6**	Elite round
3	Ukraine	3	1	0	2	7	9	−2	**3**	
4	Faroe Islands	3	0	0	3	1	15	−14	**0**	

Source: UEFA
Rules for classification: Qualification tiebreakers
(H) Hosts
10 October 2017
11:30

Switzerland	4–0	Faroe Islands
Kerr 35', 80+4'; Sturgess 46'; Messerli 55'	Report

Stadion Miejski im. Inowrocławskich Olimpijczyków, Inowrocław
Referee: Solen Dallongeville (France)
10 October 2017
15:30

Ukraine	1–3	Poland
Bilokur 4'	Report	Kozak 1'; Lukach 40' (o.g.); Oleksiak 60'

Stadion Miejski im. Inowrocławskich Olimpijczyków, Inowrocław
Referee: Araksya Saribekyan (Armenia)

13 October 2017
16:00

Switzerland	5–0	Ukraine
Messerli 2' (pen.), 10', 17'; Sturgess 27'; Kerr 45' (pen.)	Report

Stadion Miejski, Tuchola
Referee: Karoline Wacker (Germany)
13 October 2017
16:00

Poland	5–0	Faroe Islands
Buszewska 9'; Tomasiak 20'; Filipczak 39'; Achcińska 57'; Glinka 69'	Report

Stadion Miejski, Szubin
Referee: Araksya Saribekyan (Armenia)

16 October 2017
15:30

Poland	2–1	Switzerland
Filipczak 2'; Achcińska 63'	Report	Achcińska 16' (o.g.)

Stadion Miejski, Tuchola
Referee: Karoline Wacker (Germany)
16 October 2017
15:30

Faroe Islands	1–6	Ukraine
Tórolvsdóttir 26'	Report	Bilokur 46', 49'; Godunko 53'; Kotiash 59', 61'; Yanchuk 76'

Stadion Miejski, Szubin
Referee: Solen Dallongeville (France)

==== Group 2 ====
Pos	Team	Pld	W	D	L	GF	GA	GD	Pts	Qualification
1	England	3	3	0	0	19	0	+19	**9**	Elite round
2	Scotland	3	2	0	1	5	3	+2	**6**	Elite round
3	Slovakia	3	1	0	2	5	7	−2	**3**	
4	Latvia (H)	3	0	0	3	0	19	−19	**0**	

Source: UEFA
Rules for classification: Qualification tiebreakers
(H) Hosts
14 October 2017
10:00

Slovakia	0–1	Scotland
	Report	Fleming 29'

Rīgas Hanzas vidusskola, Riga
Attendance: 30
Referee: Merima Čelik (Bosnia and Herzegovina)
14 October 2017
14:00

England	10–0	Latvia
James 1', 15', 25', 53'; Park 23', 54', 78'; Salmon 33'; Griffin 36'; Blanchard 59'	Report

Rīgas Hanzas vidusskola, Riga
Attendance: 100
Referee: Kateryna Usova (Ukraine)

17 October 2017
11:00

Scotland	4–0	Latvia
Santoyo-Brown 8', 27'; Cross 40+2'; Mitchell 74' (pen.)	Report

Rīgas Hanzas vidusskola, Riga
Attendance: 70
Referee: Merima Čelik (Bosnia and Herzegovina)
17 October 2017
15:00

England	6–0	Slovakia
Griffin 5'; Salmon 36', 51'; Jhamat 50' (pen.); James 59' (pen.), 79'	Report

Rīgas Hanzas vidusskola, Riga
Attendance: 40
Referee: Alexandra Ponomareva (Russia)

20 October 2017
11:00

Scotland	0–3	England
	Report	Blanchard 31'; Park 59', 74'

Ogres pilsētas stadions, Ogre
Attendance: 70
Referee: Alexandra Ponomareva (Russia)
20 October 2017
11:00

Latvia	0–5	Slovakia
	Report	Tejová 20', 74'; Semanová 28'; Gaugere 51' (o.g.); Gašparovičová 56' (pen.)

Rīgas Hanzas vidusskola, Riga
Attendance: 65
Referee: Kateryna Usova (Ukraine)

==== Group 3 ====
Pos	Team	Pld	W	D	L	GF	GA	GD	Pts	Qualification
1	Spain	3	3	0	0	27	1	+26	**9**	Elite round
2	Iceland	3	2	0	1	8	2	+6	**6**	Elite round
3	Azerbaijan (H)	3	0	1	2	1	6	−5	**1**	Elite round
4	Montenegro	3	0	1	2	1	28	−27	**1**	

Source: UEFA
Rules for classification: Qualification tiebreakers
(H) Hosts
2 October 2017
13:00

Spain	22–0	Montenegro
Marín 11', 26'; Okoye 18', 47'; Pina 19', 28', 31', 44', 49', 50', 80+3'; Navarro 40', 40+3', 57', 72'; Vukanić 54' (o.g.); Vilamala 59', 64', 76'; López 66', 80'; Arana 67'	Report

Baku National Stadium 2, Baku
Referee: Lucie Šulcová (Czech Republic)
2 October 2017
17:00

Azerbaijan	0–2	Iceland
	Report	Hálfdánardóttir 9'; Sigurðardóttir 46'

Baku National Stadium 2, Baku
Referee: Hristiana Guteva (Bulgaria)

5 October 2017
13:00

Iceland	5–0	Montenegro
Jack 19'; Hákonardóttir 43'; Ramčilović 46' (o.g.); Jónsdóttir 59'; Sigurðardóttir 63'	Report

Dalga Arena, Baku
Referee: Hristiana Guteva (Bulgaria)
5 October 2017
17:00

Spain	3–0	Azerbaijan
Pina 14', 80+4' (pen.); Marín 20'	Report

Dalga Arena, Baku
Referee: Liliya Hasanova (Kazakhstan)

8 October 2017
17:00

Iceland	1–2	Spain
Vilhjálmsdóttir 32'	Report	Pina 13', 50'

Baku National Stadium 2, Baku
Referee: Liliya Hasanova (Kazakhstan)
8 October 2017
17:00

Montenegro	1–1	Azerbaijan
Nađa 5'	Report	Mirzaliyeva 21'

Dalga Arena, Baku
Referee: Lucie Šulcová (Czech Republic)

==== Group 4 ====
Pos	Team	Pld	W	D	L	GF	GA	GD	Pts	Qualification
1	Republic of Ireland	3	3	0	0	5	0	+5	**9**	Elite round
2	Bosnia and Herzegovina (H)	3	2	0	1	2	1	+1	**6**	Elite round
3	Romania	3	0	1	2	1	4	−3	**1 (Note: Ranked by disciplinary points (Romania: 2 pts; Greece: 3 pts).)**	Elite round
4	Greece	3	0	1	2	1	4	−3	**1**	

Source: UEFA
Rules for classification: Qualification tiebreakers
(H) Hosts
Notes:
24 September 2017
11:00

Romania	1–1	Greece
Marcu 5'	Report	Proxenou 80+4'

Bosnia and Herzegovina FA Training Centre, Zenica
Referee: Reelika Turi (Estonia)
24 September 2017
16:00

Republic of Ireland	1–0	Bosnia and Herzegovina
Mackey 77'	Report

Bosnia and Herzegovina FA Training Centre, Zenica
Referee: Katarzyna Lisiecka-Sęk (Poland)

27 September 2017
11:00

Republic of Ireland	2–0	Romania
Toland 40+2' (pen.); Atkinson 78' (pen.)	Report

Bosnia and Herzegovina FA Training Centre, Zenica
Referee: Tinna Høj Christensen (Denmark)
27 September 2017
16:00

Greece	0–1	Bosnia and Herzegovina
	Report	Gavrić 31'

Bosnia and Herzegovina FA Training Centre, Zenica
Referee: Reelika Turi (Estonia)

30 September 2017
16:00

Greece	0–2	Republic of Ireland
	Report	Fowler 21'; Masterson 75'

Stadion Mladost Kakanj, Kakanj
Referee: Tinna Høj Christensen (Denmark)
30 September 2017
16:00

Bosnia and Herzegovina	1–0	Romania
Krajšumović 24'	Report

Bosnia and Herzegovina FA Training Centre, Zenica
Referee: Katarzyna Lisiecka-Sęk (Poland)

==== Group 5 ====
Pos	Team	Pld	W	D	L	GF	GA	GD	Pts	Qualification
1	France	3	2	1	0	16	0	+16	**7**	Elite round
2	Denmark (H)	3	2	1	0	8	0	+8	**7**	Elite round
3	Wales	3	1	0	2	8	6	+2	**3**	
4	Kazakhstan	3	0	0	3	0	26	−26	**0**	

Source: UEFA
Rules for classification: Qualification tiebreakers
(H) Hosts
24 September 2017
15:00

Wales	0–2	Denmark
	Report	Møller Holdt 22'; Snerle 51'

Mosevejs Sportsplads, Kolding
Referee: Andromachi Tsiofliki (Greece)
24 September 2017
18:00

France	12–0	Kazakhstan
Zahot 3'; Roth 7', 18', 27', 52'; Craff 8', 62'; Bussy 16', 26'; Dufour 22'; Moreira 36'; Zubieta 73'	Report

Kolding Stadion, Kolding
Referee: Shona Shukrula (Netherlands)

27 September 2017
15:00

France	4–0	Wales
Le Mouël 15'; Roth 18', 35'; Craff 69'	Report

Mosevejs Sportsplads, Kolding
Referee: Marina Višnjić (Serbia)
27 September 2017
18:00

Denmark	6–0	Kazakhstan
Snerle 20'; Lykke 41', 48', 51', 57'; Christensen 62'	Report

Kolding Stadion, Kolding
Referee: Andromachi Tsiofliki (Greece)

30 September 2017
15:00

Denmark	0–0	France
	Report

Kolding Stadion, Kolding
Referee: Marina Višnjić (Serbia)
30 September 2017
15:00

Kazakhstan	0–8	Wales
	Report	Sibanda 6', 62'; Hughes 37', 43', 49'; Jones 39', 78'; Vine 52' (pen.)

Mosevejs Sportsplads, Kolding
Referee: Shona Shukrula (Netherlands)

==== Group 6 ====
Pos	Team	Pld	W	D	L	GF	GA	GD	Pts	Qualification
1	Sweden (H)	3	3	0	0	19	0	+19	**9**	Elite round
2	Russia	3	2	0	1	3	7	−4	**6**	Elite round
3	Israel	3	1	0	2	2	3	−1	**3**	Elite round
4	Croatia	3	0	0	3	1	15	−14	**0**	

Source: UEFA
Rules for classification: Qualification tiebreakers
(H) Hosts
16 October 2017
18:00

Sweden	1–0	Israel
Lang 19'	Report

Rimnersvallen, Uddevalla
Referee: Andromachi Tsiofliki (Greece)
16 October 2017
18:00

Croatia	0–2	Russia
	Report	Kulakova 36'; Komissarova 68'

Uddevalla Arena, Ljungskile
Referee: Valentina Finzi (Italy)

19 October 2017
18:00

Sweden	11–0	Croatia
Olsson 4', 28'; Paulsson 17' (pen.), 59', 64'; Lang 20'; Lilja Vidlund 29', 40', 79'; Walentowicz 48'; Sjögren 76'	Report

Uddevalla Arena, Ljungskile
Referee: Rebecca Welch (England)
19 October 2017
18:00

Russia	1–0	Israel
Solonovich 80+2'	Report

Rimnersvallen, Uddevalla
Referee: Valentina Finzi (Italy)

22 October 2017
13:00

Russia	0–7	Sweden
	Report	Lindell 1'; Ljung Klingwall 21' (pen.); Lilja Vidlund 23'; Olsson 29', 30', 48'; Lindwall 76'

Rimnersvallen, Uddevalla
Referee: Rebecca Welch (England)
22 October 2017
13:00

Israel	2–1	Croatia
Al Ramhe 19'; Nelson-Levy 69'	Report	Lucić 16'

Uddevalla Arena, Ljungskile
Referee: Andromachi Tsiofliki (Greece)

==== Group 7 ====
Pos	Team	Pld	W	D	L	GF	GA	GD	Pts	Qualification
1	Netherlands	3	3	0	0	15	0	+15	**9**	Elite round
2	Czech Republic	3	2	0	1	10	4	+6	**6**	Elite round
3	Turkey	3	1	0	2	5	5	0	**3**	Elite round
4	Estonia (H)	3	0	0	3	0	21	−21	**0**	

Source: UEFA
Rules for classification: Qualification tiebreakers
(H) Hosts
1 October 2017
12:00

Turkey	0–3	Netherlands
	Report	Leuchter 25'; Van der Linde 59'; Tromp 76' (pen.)

Kadriorg Stadium, Tallinn
Referee: Sandra Strub (Switzerland)
1 October 2017
15:00

Czech Republic	8–0	Estonia
Cvrčková 5', 72'; Šubrtová 6', 45'; Marcinková 50', 63'; Ličmanová 70'; Pochmanová 80+2'	Report

A. Le Coq Arena, Tallinn
Referee: Rasa Imanalijeva (Lithuania)

4 October 2017
15:00

Czech Republic	2–1	Turkey
Marcinková 35'; Cvrčková 49'	Report	Öztürk 55'

Kadriorg Stadium, Tallinn
Referee: Irina Turovskaya (Belarus)
4 October 2017
18:00

Netherlands	9–0	Estonia
Ravensbergen 4', 39', 42'; Van de Westeringh 15'; Leuchter 34', 45'; Tromp 66', 71', 76'	Report

A. Le Coq Arena, Tallinn
Referee: Rasa Imanalijeva (Lithuania)

7 October 2017
15:00

Netherlands	3–0	Czech Republic
Leuchter 38', 59'; Tromp 41'	Report

Kadriorg Stadium, Tallinn
Referee: Irina Turovskaya (Belarus)
7 October 2017
15:00

Estonia	0–4	Turkey
	Report	Taşkın 7'; Altıntaş 65', 80+3'; Keskin 66' (pen.)

A. Le Coq Arena, Tallinn
Referee: Sandra Strub (Switzerland)

==== Group 8 ====
Pos	Team	Pld	W	D	L	GF	GA	GD	Pts	Qualification
1	Hungary (H)	3	3	0	0	9	0	+9	**9**	Elite round
2	Norway	3	2	0	1	14	1	+13	**6**	Elite round
3	Bulgaria	3	1	0	2	1	10	−9	**3**	
4	Moldova	3	0	0	3	0	13	−13	**0**	

Source: UEFA
Rules for classification: Qualification tiebreakers
(H) Hosts
22 September 2017
16:00

Norway	9–0	Moldova
Østrem 3', 20', 60'; Terland 13', 40+2', 50'; Østenstad 62'; Huse 63', 79'	Report

Ménfői úti Stadion, Győr
Referee: Kateryna Usova (Ukraine)
22 September 2017
16:00

Bulgaria	0–5	Hungary
	Report	Szélpál 3', 15'; Nagy 12'; Pusztai 18'; Czellér 45'

Sportcentrum Bük, Bük
Referee: Irena Velevačkoska (Macedonia)

25 September 2017
16:00

Norway	5–0	Bulgaria
Bragstad 32', 42'; Østrem 40+2'; Hegg 53'; Fornes 61'	Report

Ménfői úti Stadion, Győr
Referee: Yuliya Larionova (Azerbaijan)
25 September 2017
16:00

Hungary	3–0	Moldova
Szélpál 33'; Pintye 49'; Stefán 59'	Report

Sportcentrum Bük, Bük
Referee: Irena Velevačkoska (Macedonia)

28 September 2017
16:00

Hungary	1–0	Norway
Fördős 7'	Report

Sportcentrum Bük, Bük
Referee: Yuliya Larionova (Azerbaijan)
28 September 2017
16:00

Moldova	0–1	Bulgaria
	Report	Naydenova 80+2'

Ménfői úti Stadion, Győr
Referee: Kateryna Usova (Ukraine)

==== Group 9 ====
Pos	Team	Pld	W	D	L	GF	GA	GD	Pts	Qualification
1	Serbia (H)	3	2	1	0	13	2	+11	**7**	Elite round
2	Belgium	3	2	1	0	12	2	+10	**7**	Elite round
3	Belarus	3	1	0	2	7	10	−3	**3**	
4	Macedonia	3	0	0	3	1	19	−18	**0**	

Source: UEFA
Rules for classification: Qualification tiebreakers
(H) Hosts
23 September 2017
16:00

Belgium	3–0	Macedonia
De Groote 7'; Knapen 30', 45'	Report

Stadion FK Žarkovo, Belgrade
Referee: María Dolores Martínez Madrona (Spain)
23 September 2017
16:00

Belarus	0–2	Serbia
	Report	Barjaktarović 23', 25'

Sports Center of FA of Serbia, Stara Pazova
Referee: Neslihan Muratdağı (Turkey)

26 September 2017
16:00

Belgium	7–0	Belarus
Teulings 6'; Knapen 16', 20'; Buabadi 22'; De Groote 28'; Schuilen 48'; Camps 69'	Report

Stadion FK Žarkovo, Belgrade
Referee: Frida Nielsen (Denmark)
26 September 2017
16:00

Serbia	9–0	Macedonia
Barjaktarović 11'; Bulatović 15'; Nikolova 29' (o.g.); Stupar 40'; Petrović 46', 49', 80+2' (pen.); Radić 72'; Krstić 77'	Report

Zemun Stadium, Belgrade
Referee: Neslihan Muratdağı (Turkey)

29 September 2017
16:00

Serbia	2–2	Belgium
Petrović 36' (pen.); Krstić 43'	Report	De Bondt 50', 69'

Stadion FK Žarkovo, Belgrade
Referee: Frida Nielsen (Denmark)
29 September 2017
16:00

Macedonia	1–7	Belarus
Velkova 60'	Report	Zheleznikova 14', 77'; Tikhvodova 55', 65' (pen.), 71', 80+2'; Stankevich 76'

Sports Center of FA of Serbia, Stara Pazova
Referee: María Dolores Martínez Madrona (Spain)

==== Group 10 ====
Pos	Team	Pld	W	D	L	GF	GA	GD	Pts	Qualification
1	Austria	3	3	0	0	24	1	+23	**9**	Elite round
2	Portugal (H)	3	2	0	1	14	3	+11	**6**	Elite round
3	Northern Ireland	3	1	0	2	3	11	−8	**3**	
4	Georgia	3	0	0	3	0	26	−26	**0**	

Source: UEFA
Rules for classification: Qualification tiebreakers
(H) Hosts
25 September 2017
15:00

Austria	13–0	Georgia
Kolb 8', 51'; Degen 17', 26', 33', 36', 70'; Wenger 29'; Plattner 38', 58' (pen.), 61'; Höbinger 49'; Frieser 78'	Report

Centro de Treino, Luso
Referee: Sabina Bolić (Croatia)
25 September 2017
17:00

Northern Ireland	1–2	Portugal
McEvoy 46'	Report	Encarnação 2', 54'

Complexo Desportivo da Tocha, Tocha
Referee: Iuliana Demetrescu (Romania)

28 September 2017
15:00

Austria	9–0	Northern Ireland
Degen 10'; Mittermair 35', 46', 58'; Frieser 45', 54'; Kofler 51' (pen.); Plattner 55'; Schasching 79'	Report

Centro de Treino, Luso
Referee: Irina Lyussina (Belgium)
28 September 2017
17:00

Portugal	11–0	Georgia
Encarnação 4', 5', 23'; Teles 14'; Santos 51', 80+2'; Marques 59'; Costa 63', 65', 71'; Dias 67'	Report

Complexo Desportivo da Tocha, Tocha
Referee: Iuliana Demetrescu (Romania)

1 October 2017
16:00

Portugal	1–2	Austria
Encarnação 40+1'	Report	Mittermair 35'; Kolb 55'

Estádio Municipal Carlos Duarte, Pampilhosa
Referee: Irina Lyussina (Belgium)
1 October 2017
16:00

Georgia	0–2	Northern Ireland
	Report	Bell 30', 49'

Estádio Municipal Sérgio Conceição, Coimbra
Referee: Sabina Bolić (Croatia)

==== Group 11 ====
Pos	Team	Pld	W	D	L	GF	GA	GD	Pts	Qualification
1	Italy	3	1	2	0	4	3	+1	**5 (Note: Head-to-head results: Slovenia 0–0 Finland, Italy 1–1 Slovenia, Finland 1–1 Italy. Head-to-head standings: Italy: 2 pts, 0 GD, 2 GF; Finland: 2 pts, 0 GD, 1 GF; Slovenia: 2 pts, 0 GD, 1 GF; Italy are ranked first on head-to-head goals scored. Finland and Slovenia are tied on their own head-to-head result, and are ranked on total goal difference.)**	Elite round
2	Finland	3	1	2	0	9	2	+7	**5**	Elite round
3	Slovenia (H)	3	1	2	0	3	1	+2	**5**	Elite round
4	Malta	3	0	0	3	2	12	−10	**0**	

Source: UEFA
Rules for classification: Qualification tiebreakers
(H) Hosts
Notes:
23 October 2017
11:30

Italy	2–1	Malta
Landa 32', 39'	Report	Grech 22'

NNC Brdo, Kranj
Referee: Meitar Shemesh (Israel)
23 October 2017
15:00

Slovenia	0–0	Finland
	Report

NNC Brdo, Kranj
Referee: Kristina Kozoroh (Ukraine)

26 October 2017
11:30

Finland	8–1	Malta
Huhta 15'; Kosola 18'; Vuorinen 37', 51'; Sciberras 48' (o.g.); Mäkinen 72'; Leskinen 74'; Juvonen 80+2'	Report	Farrugia 54'

NNC Brdo, Kranj
Referee: Kristina Kozoroh (Ukraine)
26 October 2017
15:00

Italy	1–1	Slovenia
Tomaselli 1'	Report	Korošec 13' (pen.)

NNC Brdo, Kranj
Referee: Lucie Šulcová (Czech Republic)

29 October 2017
15:00

Finland	1–1	Italy
Juvonen 3'	Report	Bellucci 57'

Stanko Mlakar Stadium, Kranj
Referee: Lucie Šulcová (Czech Republic)
29 October 2017
15:00

Malta	0–2	Slovenia
	Report	Milovič 25'; Žolek 35'

NNC Brdo, Kranj
Referee: Meitar Shemesh (Israel)

=== Ranking of third-placed teams ===
To determine the five best third-placed teams from the qualifying round which advance to the elite round, only the results of the third-placed teams against the first and second-placed teams in their group are taken into account.

Pos	Grp	Team	Pld	W	D	L	GF	GA	GD	Pts	Qualification
1	11	Slovenia	2	0	2	0	1	1	0	2	Elite round
2	6	Israel	2	0	0	2	0	2	−2	0	Elite round
3	4	Romania	2	0	0	2	0	3	−3	0	Elite round
4	7	Turkey	2	0	0	2	1	5	−4	0	Elite round
5	3	Azerbaijan	2	0	0	2	0	5	−5	0	Elite round
6	5	Wales	2	0	0	2	0	6	−6	0	
7	1	Ukraine	2	0	0	2	1	8	−7	0	
8	2	Slovakia	2	0	0	2	0	7	−7	0	
9	9	Belarus	2	0	0	2	0	9	−9	0	
10	10	Northern Ireland	2	0	0	2	1	11	−10	0	
11	8	Bulgaria	2	0	0	2	0	10	−10	0	

Source: UEFA
Rules for classification: 1) points; 2) goal difference; 3) goals scored; 4) disciplinary points; 5) coefficient; 6) drawing of lots.

== Elite round ==
=== Draw ===
The draw for the elite round was held on 24 November 2017, 11:45 CET (UTC+1), at the UEFA headquarters in Nyon, Switzerland.

The teams were seeded according to their results in the qualifying round. Germany, which received a bye to the elite round, were automatically seeded into Pot A. Each group contained one team from Pot A, one team from Pot B, one team from Pot C, and one team from Pot D. Winners and runners-up from the same qualifying round group could not be drawn in the same group, but the best third-placed teams could be drawn in the same group as winners or runners-up from the same qualifying round group.

Pos	Grp	Team	Pld	W	D	L	GF	GA	GD	Pts	Seeding
1	—	Germany	0	0	0	0	0	0	0	0	Pot A
2	3	Spain	3	3	0	0	27	1	+26	9	Pot A
3	10	Austria	3	3	0	0	24	1	+23	9	Pot A
4	2	England	3	3	0	0	19	0	+19	9 (Note: Ranked by disciplinary points (England: 1 pt; Sweden: 3 pts).)	Pot A
5	6	Sweden	3	3	0	0	19	0	+19	9	Pot A
6	7	Netherlands	3	3	0	0	15	0	+15	9	Pot A
7	8	Hungary	3	3	0	0	9	0	+9	9	Pot A
8	1	Poland	3	3	0	0	10	2	+8	9	Pot B
9	4	Republic of Ireland	3	3	0	0	5	0	+5	9	Pot B
10	5	France	3	2	1	0	16	0	+16	7	Pot B
11	9	Serbia	3	2	1	0	13	2	+11	7	Pot B
12	9	Belgium	3	2	1	0	12	2	+10	7	Pot B
13	5	Denmark	3	2	1	0	8	0	+8	7	Pot B
14	8	Norway	3	2	0	1	14	1	+13	6	Pot B
15	10	Portugal	3	2	0	1	14	3	+11	6	Pot C
16	1	Switzerland	3	2	0	1	10	2	+8	6	Pot C
17	7	Czech Republic	3	2	0	1	10	4	+6	6	Pot C
18	3	Iceland	3	2	0	1	8	2	+6	6	Pot C
19	2	Scotland	3	2	0	1	5	3	+2	6	Pot C
20	4	Bosnia and Herzegovina	3	2	0	1	2	1	+1	6	Pot C
21	6	Russia	3	2	0	1	3	7	−4	6	Pot C
22	11	Finland	3	1	2	0	9	2	+7	5	Pot D
23	11	Slovenia (Y)	3	1	2	0	3	1	+2	5	Pot D
24	11	Italy	3	1	2	0	4	3	+1	5	Pot D
25	7	Turkey (Y)	3	1	0	2	5	5	0	3	Pot D
26	6	Israel (Y)	3	1	0	2	2	3	−1	3	Pot D
27	4	Romania (Y)	3	0	1	2	1	4	−3	1	Pot D
28	3	Azerbaijan (Y)	3	0	1	2	1	6	−5	1	Pot D

Source: UEFA
Rules for classification: 1) points; 2) goal difference; 3) goals scored; 4) disciplinary points; 5) coefficient; 6) drawing of lots.
(Y) Third-placed teams from qualifying round (may be drawn with teams from same qualifying round group)

=== Groups ===
The elite round must be played between 1 February and 1 April 2018.

Times up to 24 March 2018 are CET (UTC+1), thereafter times are CEST (UTC+2).

==== Group 1 ====
Pos	Team	Pld	W	D	L	GF	GA	GD	Pts	Qualification
1	Netherlands (H)	3	3	0	0	8	2	+6	9	Final tournament
2	Portugal	3	2	0	1	10	2	+8	6	
3	Belgium	3	1	0	2	8	6	+2	3	
4	Romania	3	0	0	3	0	16	−16	0	

Source: UEFA
Rules for classification: Qualification tiebreakers
(H) Hosts
23 March 2018
15:30

Portugal	2–0	Belgium
Encarnação 72', 80+1'	Report

Sportpark De Hanen Weide, Veen
Referee: Yuliya Larionova (Azerbaijan)
23 March 2018
19:00

Netherlands	2–0	Romania
Tromp 2', 45'	Report

Sportpark De Watertoren, Zaltbommel
Referee: Henrikke Nervik (Norway)

26 March 2018
15:30

Belgium	6–0	Romania
Knapen 10'; Mertens 22'; Ciontos 26' (o.g.); Eurlings 29', 78'; Wils 53'	Report

Sportpark De Watertoren, Zaltbommel
Referee: Yuliya Larionova (Azerbaijan)
26 March 2018
19:00

Netherlands	2–0	Portugal
Leuchter 39'; Grant 68'	Report

Sportpark De Hanen Weide, Veen
Referee: Marina Višnjić (Serbia)

29 March 2018
19:00

Belgium	2–4	Netherlands
Camps 11'; Mertens 37' (pen.)	Report	Leuchter 5', 47'; Van de Westeringh 18'; Tromp 75'

Sportpark De Watertoren, Zaltbommel
Referee: Marina Višnjić (Serbia)
29 March 2018
19:00

Romania	0–8	Portugal
	Report	Jacinto 36', 79' (pen.); Silva 50', 62'; Encarnação 52', 80+4'; Teles 65'; Rusu 80+3' (o.g.)

Sportpark De Hanen Weide, Veen
Referee: Henrikke Nervik (Norway)

==== Group 2 ====
Pos	Team	Pld	W	D	L	GF	GA	GD	Pts	Qualification
1	Finland	3	2	1	0	11	3	+8	7	Final tournament
2	France (H)	3	2	1	0	11	4	+7	7	
3	Sweden	3	1	0	2	7	7	0	3	
4	Scotland	3	0	0	3	0	15	−15	0	

Source: UEFA
Rules for classification: Qualification tiebreakers
(H) Hosts
22 March 2018
14:00

Scotland	0–6	France
	Report	Kazadi Ntambwe 31', 40+2'; Revelli 44'; Schmeler 60'; Dufour 74'; Roth 79'

Stade André-Darrigade, Dax
Referee: Karoline Wacker (Germany)
22 March 2018
18:00

Sweden	1–4	Finland
Lang 27'	Report	Walentowicz 12' (o.g.); Siren 13'; Vuorinen 60'; Kantanen 80+1'

Plaine des Sports, Saint-Paul-lès-Dax
Referee: Catarina Campos (Portugal)

25 March 2018
15:00

France	2–2	Finland
Roth 56'; Boucly 67'	Report	Kantanen 23'; Topra 57'

Plaine des Sports, Saint-Paul-lès-Dax
Referee: Karoline Wacker (Germany)
25 March 2018
17:00

Sweden	4–0	Scotland
Lindwall 10'; Jontoft 33'; Johansson 45', 75'	Report

Stade André-Darrigade, Dax
Referee: Hannelore Onsea (Belgium)

28 March 2018
15:00

France	3–2	Sweden
Feller 19'; Boucly 38'; Dufour 48'	Report	Törnblom 51'; Olsson 60'

Plaine des Sports, Saint-Paul-lès-Dax
Referee: Hannelore Onsea (Belgium)
28 March 2018
15:00

Finland	5–0	Scotland
Topra 49', 68', 72'; Vuorinen 67', 75'	Report

Stade André-Darrigade, Dax
Referee: Catarina Campos (Portugal)

==== Group 3 ====
Pos	Team	Pld	W	D	L	GF	GA	GD	Pts	Qualification
1	Spain	3	3	0	0	12	0	+12	9	Final tournament
2	Denmark	3	2	0	1	4	2	+2	6	
3	Russia	3	0	1	2	2	8	−6	1	
4	Israel (H)	3	0	1	2	1	9	−8	1	

Source: UEFA
Rules for classification: Qualification tiebreakers
(H) Hosts
8 March 2018
14:00

Spain	7–0	Israel
Pina 6', 71' (pen.); Peña 11'; Vilamala 45'; Okoye 50'; López 58'; Esteve 74'	Report

Shefayim National Team Complex, Shefayim
Referee: Victoria Beyer (France)
8 March 2018
14:00

Russia	1–3	Denmark
Abdullina 36' (pen.)	Report	Pernille 70'; Hasbo 72'; Larsen 77'

Ramat Gan Stadium, Ramat Gan
Referee: Hristiana Guteva (Bulgaria)

11 March 2018
14:00

Spain	4–0	Russia
Navarro 13'; Pina 30'; Hernández 36'; Paralluelo 79'	Report

Ramat Gan Stadium, Ramat Gan
Referee: Katarzyna Lisiecka-sek (Poland)
11 March 2018
14:00

Denmark	1–0	Israel
Madsen 48'	Report

Shefayim National Team Complex, Shefayim
Referee: Hristiana Guteva (Bulgaria)

14 March 2018
14:00

Denmark	0–1	Spain
	Report	Pina 44'

Ramat Gan Stadium, Ramat Gan
Referee: Katarzyna Lisiecka-sek (Poland)
14 March 2018
14:00

Israel	1–1	Russia
Kuznezov 56'	Report	Komissarova 10'

Shefayim National Team Complex, Shefayim
Referee: Victoria Beyer (France)

==== Group 4 ====
Pos	Team	Pld	W	D	L	GF	GA	GD	Pts	Qualification
1	Italy	3	2	1	0	5	0	+5	7	Final tournament
2	Serbia	3	1	1	1	2	4	−2	4	
3	Hungary (H)	3	1	0	2	3	3	0	3	
4	Czech Republic	3	0	2	1	1	4	−3	2	

Source: UEFA
Rules for classification: Qualification tiebreakers
(H) Hosts
23 March 2018
15:00

Hungary	0–2	Italy
	Report	Tomaselli 70'; Ladu 75'

Sportcentrum Bük, Bük
Referee: Iuliana Demetrescu (Romania)
23 March 2018
15:00

Czech Republic	1–1	Serbia
Vorkapić 79' (o.g.)	Report	Plavšić 59'

Perutz Stadion, Pápa
Referee: Sandra Strub (Switzerland)

26 March 2018
16:00

Hungary	3–0	Czech Republic
Szélpál 9'; Nagy 39'; Vachter 79'	Report

Sportcentrum Bük, Bük
Referee: Frida Nielsen (Denmark)
26 March 2018
16:00

Serbia	0–3	Italy
	Report	Tamborini 29', 65'; Fracas 60'

Perutz Stadion, Pápa
Referee: Sandra Strub (Switzerland)

29 March 2018
16:00

Serbia	1–0	Hungary
Plavšić 30'	Report

Ménfői úti Stadion, Győr
Referee: Frida Nielsen (Denmark)
29 March 2018
16:00

Italy	0–0	Czech Republic
	Report

Sportcentrum Bük, Bük
Referee: Iuliana Demetrescu (Romania)

==== Group 5 ====
Pos	Team	Pld	W	D	L	GF	GA	GD	Pts	Qualification
1	England	3	2	1	0	6	0	+6	7	Final tournament
2	Norway (H)	3	2	0	1	6	2	+4	6	
3	Slovenia	3	1	1	1	2	2	0	4	
4	Switzerland	3	0	0	3	1	11	−10	0	

Source: UEFA
Rules for classification: Qualification tiebreakers
(H) Hosts
25 March 2018
13:00

England	0–0	Slovenia
	Report

Klepp Stadion, Kleppe
Referee: Ainara Andrea Acevedo Dudley (Spain)
25 March 2018
17:30

Switzerland	0–5	Norway
	Report	Terland 4'; Lillegård 17'; Blakstad 48'; Østenstad 51'; Hegg 59'

Klepp Stadion, Kleppe
Referee: Araksya Saribekyan (Armenia)

28 March 2018
13:00

England	4–0	Switzerland
Blanchard 28', 64'; Griffin 61'; Kearns 62'	Report

Ålgård stadion, Ålgård
Referee: Andromachi Tsiofliki (Greece)
28 March 2018
17:30

Norway	1–0	Slovenia
Lillegård 13'	Report

Ålgård stadion, Ålgård
Referee: Araksya Saribekyan (Armenia)

31 March 2018
15:00

Norway	0–2	England
	Report	Park 53'; Fossem 60' (o.g.)

Klepp Stadion, Kleppe
Referee: Andromachi Tsiofliki (Greece)
31 March 2018
15:00

Slovenia	2–1	Switzerland
Milovič 33'; Zajmi 40+1'	Report	Fölmli 40+2'

Ålgård stadion, Ålgård
Referee: Ainara Andrea Acevedo Dudley (Spain)

==== Group 6 ====
Pos	Team	Pld	W	D	L	GF	GA	GD	Pts	Qualification
1	Poland	3	3	0	0	8	1	+7	9	Final tournament
2	Austria	3	1	1	1	4	2	+2	4	
3	Turkey	3	0	2	1	2	4	−2	2	
4	Bosnia and Herzegovina (H)	3	0	1	2	2	9	−7	1	

Updated to match(es) played on 25 March 2018. Source: UEFA
Rules for classification: Qualification tiebreakers
(H) Hosts
19 March 2018
15:00

Austria	0–0	Turkey
	Report

Novi Gradski Stadion, Ugljevik
Referee: Lizzy van der Helm (Netherlands)
19 March 2018
15:00

Bosnia and Herzegovina	0–4	Poland
	Report	Tomasiak 9'; Achcińska 24' (pen.); Filipczak 72'; Glinka 80+4'

Stadion Etno Selo Stanišići, Bijeljina
Referee: Jurgita Mačikunytė (Lithuania)

22 March 2018
15:00

Austria	3–0	Bosnia and Herzegovina
Wagner 52'; Frieser 75'; Wurzer 80+1'	Report

Stadion Etno Selo Stanišići, Bijeljina
Referee: Valentina Finzi (Italy)
22 March 2018
15:00

Poland	2–0	Turkey
Tomasiak 29' (pen.); Legowski 69'	Report

Novi Gradski Stadion, Ugljevik
Referee: Jurgita Mačikunytė (Lithuania)

25 March 2018
15:00

Poland	2–1	Austria
Tomasiak 3'; Glinka 76'	Report	Wagner 21'

Stadion Etno Selo Stanišići, Bijeljina
Referee: Valentina Finzi (Italy)
25 March 2018
15:00

Turkey	2–2	Bosnia and Herzegovina
Öztürk 80+1', 80+4'	Report	Mujkić 2'; Velagić 18'

Novi Gradski Stadion, Ugljevik
Referee: Lizzy van der Helm (Netherlands)

==== Group 7 ====
Pos	Team	Pld	W	D	L	GF	GA	GD	Pts	Qualification
1	Germany (H)	3	3	0	0	10	1	+9	9	Final tournament
2	Iceland	3	2	0	1	6	5	+1	6	
3	Republic of Ireland	3	1	0	2	2	4	−2	3	
4	Azerbaijan	3	0	0	3	1	9	−8	0	

Source: UEFA
Rules for classification: Qualification tiebreakers
(H) Hosts
22 March 2018
12:00

Germany	5–0	Azerbaijan
Stegemann 8'; Corley 20'; Aehling 56'; Fudalla 57'; Bernhardt 76'	Report

neu.sw Stadion, Neubrandenburg
Referee: Anastasia Romanyuk (Ukraine)
22 March 2018
15:00

Iceland	2–1	Republic of Ireland
Vilhjálmsdóttir 22' (pen.); Jónsdóttir 69'	Report	Whelan 45'

Volksstadion Greifswald, Greifswald
Referee: Meitar Shemesh (Israel)

25 March 2018
11:00

Republic of Ireland	1–0	Azerbaijan
Boyle-Carr 47'	Report

Volksstadion Greifswald, Greifswald
Referee: Meitar Shemesh (Israel)
25 March 2018
15:00

Germany	3–1	Iceland
Stegemann 15'; Martinez 47'; Fudalla 61'	Report	Zomers 74'

neu.sw Stadion, Neubrandenburg
Referee: Reelika Turi (Estonia)

28 March 2018
12:00

Republic of Ireland	0–2	Germany
	Report	Bernhardt 14'; Fuso 40+3' (pen.)

Volksstadion Greifswald, Greifswald
Referee: Reelika Turi (Estonia)
28 March 2018
12:00

Azerbaijan	1–3	Iceland
Deli 59'	Report	Eiríksdóttir 8', 36'; Jack 47'

neu.sw Stadion, Neubrandenburg
Referee: Anastasia Romanyuk (Ukraine)

== Qualified teams ==
The following eight teams qualified for the final tournament.

Team	Qualified as	Qualified on	Previous appearances in Women's Under-17 Euro^{1}
Lithuania	Hosts	26 January 2015	0 (debut)
Netherlands	Elite round Group 1 winners	29 March 2018	2 (2010, 2017)
Finland	Elite round Group 2 winners	28 March 2018	0 (debut)
Spain	Elite round Group 3 winners	14 March 2018	8 (2009, **2010**, **2011**, 2013, 2014, **2015**, 2016, 2017)
Italy	Elite round Group 4 winners	26 March 2018	2 (2014, 2016)
England	Elite round Group 5 winners	31 March 2018	5 (2008, 2014, 2015, 2016, 2017)
Poland	Elite round Group 6 winners	25 March 2018	1 (**2013**)
Germany	Elite round Group 7 winners	28 March 2018	9 (**2008**, **2009**, 2010, 2011, **2012**, **2014**, 2015, **2016**, **2017**)

^{1} Bold indicates champions for that year. Italic indicates hosts for that year.

== Goalscorers ==
15 goals

- (Spain) Clàudia Pina

10 goals

- (Portugal) Telma Encarnação

8 goals

- (France) Madeline Roth
- (Netherlands) Romée Leuchter
- (Netherlands) Nikita Tromp

6 goals

- (Austria) Celina Degen
- (England) Lauren James
- (England) Jess Park
- (Sweden) Beata Olsson

5 goals

- (Belgium) Karlijn Knapen
- (Finland) Aino Vuorinen
- (Spain) Eva Navarro

4 goals

- (Austria) Jessica Frieser
- (Austria) Linda Mittermair
- (Austria) Maria Plattner
- (Belarus) Kristina Tikhvodova
- (Denmark) Kirstine Roland Lykke
- (England) Annabel Blanchard
- (Finland) Jenna Topra
- (Hungary) Nóra Szélpál
- (Norway) Anna Østrem
- (Norway) Elisabeth Terland
- (Poland) Paulina Tomasiak
- (Serbia) Emilija Ema Petrović
- (Spain) Bruna Vilamala
- (Switzerland) Chiara Messerli
- (Sweden) Sara Lilja Vidlund

3 goals

- (Austria) Lisa Kolb
- (Czech Republic) Klára Cvrčková
- (Czech Republic) Kateřina Marcinková
- (England) Hannah Griffin
- (England) Ebony Salmon
- (France) Malaury Craff
- (France) Julie Dufour
- (Netherlands) Jaimy Ravensbergen
- (Poland) Adriana Achcińska
- (Poland) Paulina Filipczak
- (Poland) Agnieszka Glinka
- (Portugal) Sónia Costa
- (Serbia) Ana Barjaktarović
- (Spain) Irene López
- (Spain) Ainhoa Marín
- (Spain) María Isabel Okoye
- (Sweden) Kajsa Lang
- (Sweden) Emma Paulsson
- (Switzerland) Anja Kerr
- (Turkey) Melike Öztürk
- (Ukraine) Oksana Bilokur
- (Wales) Elise Hughes

2 goals

- (Austria) Julia Wagner
- (Belarus) Anastasiya Zheleznikova
- (Belgium) Romy Camps
- (Belgium) Marith De Bondt
- (Belgium) Talitha De Groote
- (Belgium) Hannah Eurlings
- (Belgium) Zenia Mertens
- (Czech Republic) Anna Šubrtová
- (Denmark) Emma Snerle
- (Finland) Kaisa Juvonen
- (Finland) Jenni Kantanen
- (France) Maïté Boucly
- (France) Kessya Bussy
- (France) Grace Kazadi Ntambwe
- (Germany) Emilie Bernhardt
- (Germany) Vanessa Fudalla
- (Germany) Greta Stegemann
- (Hungary) Vanessza Nagy
- (Iceland) Arna Eiríksdóttir
- (Iceland) Karólína Jack
- (Iceland) Sveindís Jane Jónsdóttir
- (Iceland) Clara Sigurðardóttir
- (Iceland) Karólína Lea Vilhjálmsdóttir
- (Italy) Serena Landa
- (Italy) Sara Tamborini
- (Italy) Martina Tomaselli
- (Netherlands) Kirsten van de Westeringh
- (Northern Ireland) Megan Bell
- (Norway) Emilie Bragstad
- (Norway) Eline Hegg
- (Norway) Mia Rostad Huse
- (Norway) Runa Lillegård
- (Norway) Marthine Østenstad
- (Portugal) Andreia Jacinto
- (Portugal) Daniela Santos
- (Portugal) Francisca Silva
- (Portugal) Ana Isabel Teles
- (Russia) Kristina Komissarova
- (Scotland) Elena Santoyo-Brown
- (Serbia) Andjela Krstić
- (Serbia) Nikolina Plavšić
- (Slovakia) Alexandra Tejová
- (Slovenia) Ana Milovič
- (Sweden) Lisa Johansson
- (Sweden) Tilde Lindwall
- (Switzerland) Fiona Sturgess
- (Turkey) Benan Altıntaş
- (Ukraine) Iryna Kotiash
- (Wales) Emily Jones
- (Wales) Tamsyn Sibanda

1 goal

- (Austria) Marie Therese Höbinger
- (Austria) Jana Kofler
- (Austria) Annabel Schasching
- (Austria) Claudia Wenger
- (Austria) Laura Wurzer
- (Azerbaijan) Dilara Soley Deli
- (Azerbaijan) Nigar Mirzaliyeva
- (Belarus) Karina Stankevich
- (Belgium) Esther Buabadi
- (Belgium) Valérie Schuilen
- (Belgium) Jarne Teulings
- (Belgium) Tess Wils
- (Bosnia and Herzegovina) Andrea Gavrić
- (Bosnia and Herzegovina) Sofija Krajšumović
- (Bosnia and Herzegovina) Fadila Mujkić
- (Bosnia and Herzegovina) Đula Velagić
- (Bulgaria) Gabriela Naydenova
- (Croatia) Lara Lucić
- (Czech Republic) Tereza Ličmanová
- (Czech Republic) Aneta Pochmanová
- (Denmark) Cecilie Christensen
- (Denmark) Josefine Hasbo
- (Denmark) Olivia Møller Holdt
- (Denmark) Cecilie Larsen
- (Denmark) Julie Madsen
- (Denmark) Pedersen Pernille
- (England) Simran Jhamat
- (England) Missy Bo Kearns
- (Faroe Islands) Jensa Kannuberg Tórolvsdóttir
- (Finland) Annika Huhta
- (Finland) Katariina Kosola
- (Finland) Dana Leskinen
- (Finland) Marie Mäkinen
- (Finland) Oona Siren
- (France) Naomie Feller
- (France) Margaux Le Mouël
- (France) Clara Moreira
- (France) Manon Revelli
- (France) Orane Schmeler
- (France) Sarah Zahot
- (France) Chloé Zubieta
- (Germany) Anna Aehling
- (Germany) Gia Corley
- (Germany) Ivana Fuso
- (Germany) Shekiera Martinez
- (Greece) Dimitra Proxenou
- (Hungary) Dorottya Czellér
- (Hungary) Beatrix Fördős
- (Hungary) Vivien Pintye
- (Hungary) Sára Pusztai
- (Hungary) Bernadett Stefán
- (Hungary) Fanni Vachter
- (Iceland) Hildur Thóra Hákonardóttir
- (Iceland) Helena Ósk Hálfdánardóttir
- (Iceland) Diljá Ýr Zomers
- (Israel) Dima Al Ramhe
- (Israel) Irena Kuznezov
- (Israel) Eliana Jenny Nelson-Levy
- (Italy) Melissa Bellucci
- (Italy) Teresa Fracas
- (Italy) Maria Grazia Ladu
- (North Macedonia) Sara Velkova
- (Malta) Maria Farrugia
- (Malta) Celeste Grech
- (Montenegro) Đurđevac Nađa
- (Netherlands) Chasity Grant
- (Netherlands) Isa van der Linde
- (Northern Ireland) Leah McEvoy
- (Norway) Julie Blakstad
- (Norway) Sara Kanutte Fornes
- (Poland) Zofia Buszewska
- (Poland) Kinga Kozak
- (Poland) Alexis Legowski
- (Poland) Paulina Oleksiak
- (Portugal) Maria Dias
- (Portugal) Luana Marques
- (Republic of Ireland) Isibeal Atkinson
- (Republic of Ireland) Amy Boyle-Carr
- (Republic of Ireland) Ciara Fowler
- (Republic of Ireland) Megan Mackey
- (Republic of Ireland) Louise Masterson
- (Republic of Ireland) Tyler Toland
- (Republic of Ireland) Emily Whelan
- (Romania) Carmen Marcu
- (Russia) Alsu Abdullina
- (Russia) Anastasiya Kulakova
- (Russia) Daria Solonovich
- (Scotland) Morgan Cross
- (Scotland) Leah Fleming
- (Scotland) Sadie Mitchell
- (Serbia) Milica Bulatović
- (Serbia) Milica Radić
- (Serbia) Živana Stupar
- (Slovakia) Patrícia Gašparovičová
- (Slovakia) Stela Semanová
- (Slovenia) Kaja Korošec
- (Slovenia) Luana Zajmi
- (Slovenia) Vita Žolek
- (Spain) Paula Arana
- (Spain) Aida Esteve
- (Spain) Paola Hernández
- (Spain) Salma Paralluelo
- (Spain) Leire Peña
- (Sweden) Saga Jontoft
- (Sweden) Johanna Lindell
- (Sweden) Wilma Ljung Klingwall
- (Sweden) Ebba Sjögren
- (Sweden) Elsa Törnblom
- (Sweden) Julia Walentowicz
- (Switzerland) Svenja Fölmli
- (Turkey) Elif Keskin
- (Turkey) Dilan Yeşim Taşkın
- (Ukraine) Alina Godunko
- (Ukraine) Polina Yanchuk
- (Wales) Amina Vine

1 own goal

- (Latvia) Renāte Gaugere (against Slovakia)
- (North Macedonia) Ivana Nikolova (against Serbia)
- (Malta) Nicole Sciberras (against Finland)
- (Montenegro) Dženita Ramčilović (against Iceland)
- (Montenegro) Marija Vukanić (against Spain)
- (Norway) Lotte Fikseth Fossem (against England)
- (Poland) Adriana Achcińska (against Switzerland)
- (Romania) Ioana Edvina Ciontos (against Belgium)
- (Romania) Adelina Rusu (against Portugal)
- (Serbia) Natalija Vorkapić (against Czech Republic)
- (Sweden) Julia Walentowicz (against Finland)
- (Ukraine) Romana Lukach (against Poland)

Source: UEFA.com
