= Melike Öztürk =

Turkish footballer (born 2001)

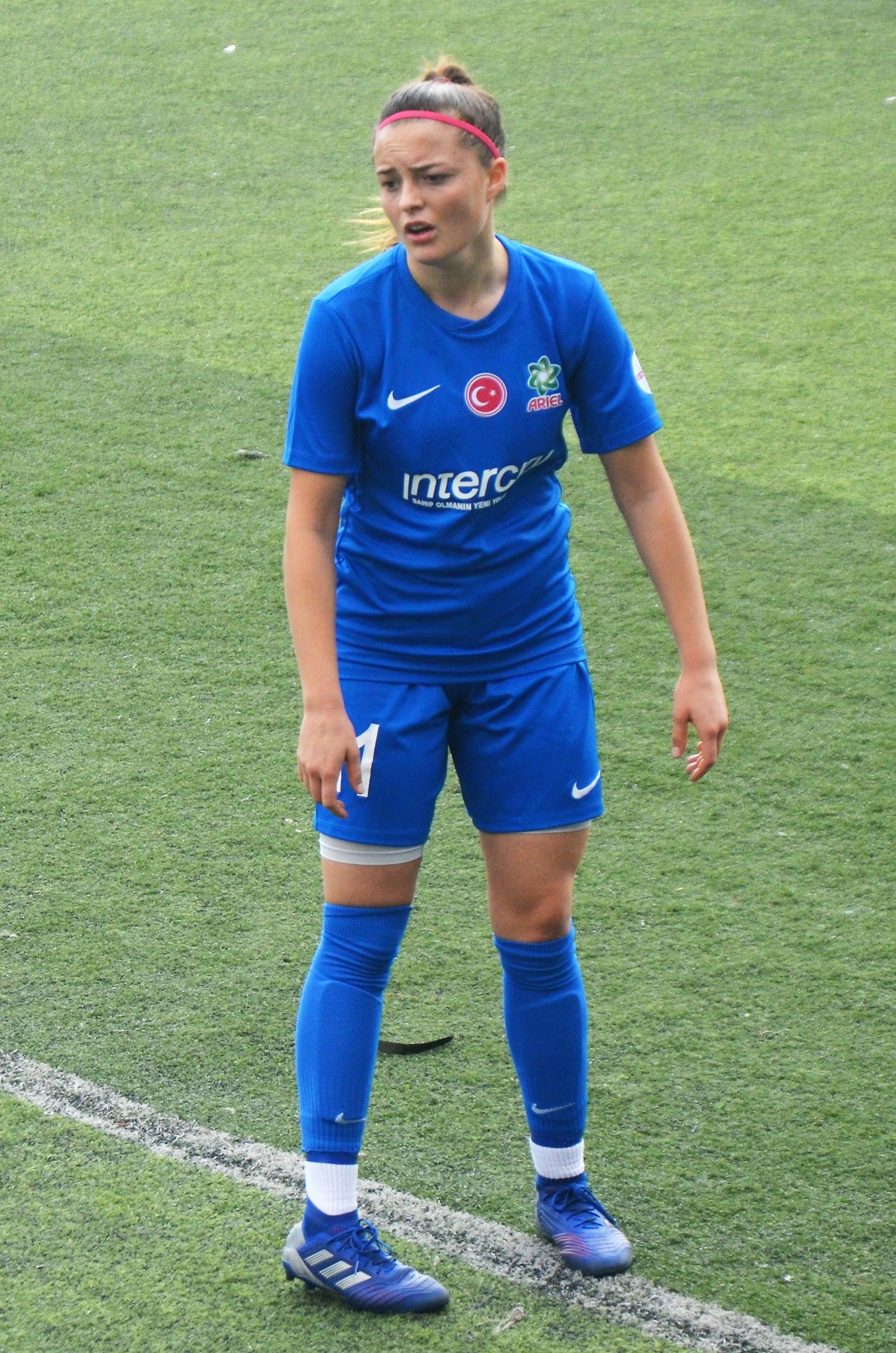
- Melike Öztürk of Ataşehir Belediyespor (2019–20 First League season)

Personal information
- Date of birth: 1 April 2001 (age 25)
- Place of birth: Gelibolu, Çanakkale, Turkey
- Position: Forward

Team information
- Current team: Galatasaray
- Number: 71

Senior career*
Years	Team	Apps	(Gls)
2015–2016	Denizli Pamukkale Üni GS	12	(24)
2016–2018	İncirliova Belediyespor	26	(67)
2018	Horozkent Spor	7	(16)
2018–2019	İncirliova Belediyespor	8	(13)
2019–2020	Ataşehir Belediyespor	15	(5)
2020–2022	Beşiktaş	23	(7)
2022–2022	Fatih Karagümrük	14	(0)
2024	Ankara BB Fomget	4	(0)
2024–2025	Fatih Vatan	14	(5)
2025–	Galatasaray	13	(3)

International career^{‡}
2016–2018	Turkey U-17	25	(13)
2018–2012	Turkey U-19	14	(2)
2020–	Turkey	10	(0)
- * Club domestic league appearances and goals as of 27 April 2025 ‡ National team caps and goals as of 30 May 2025

Melike Öztürk (born 1 April 2001) is a Turkish women's football forward, who plays in the First League for Galatasaray with jersey number 71. She was a member of the girls' national U-17 and women's U-19 teams before she was admitted to the Turkey women's team.

== Private life ==
Melike Öztürk was born in Gelibolu district of Çanakkale Province, Turkey on 1 April 2001.

== Club career ==
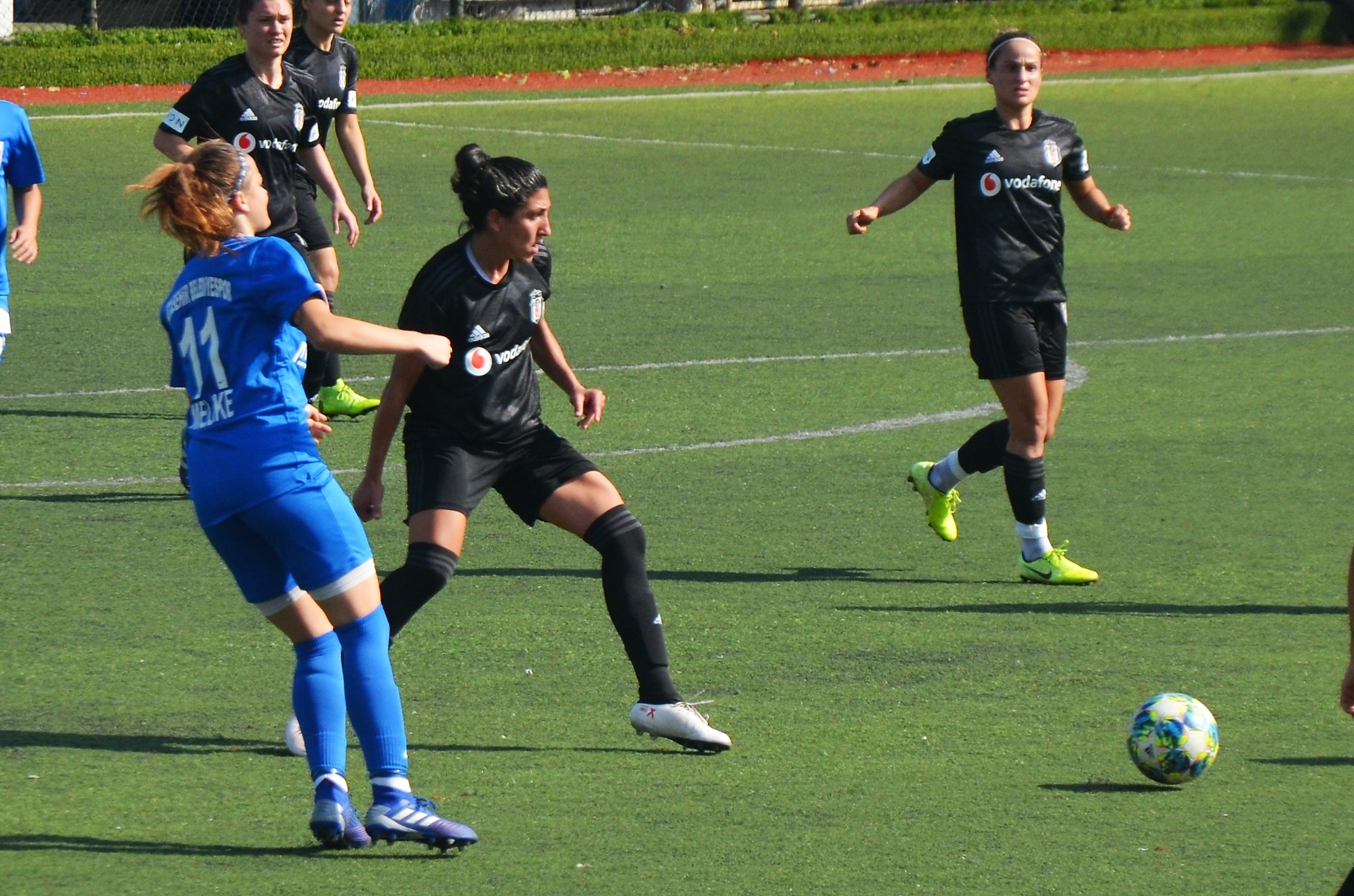
Melike Öztürk (blue) of Ataşehir Belediyespor in the 2019–20 Women's First League match against Beşiktaş J.K.

Öztürk received her license for Denizli Pamukkale Üniversitesi Gençlikspor on 13 November 2015. She capped in 12 matches for the Denizli-based university team in the 2015–16 Turkish Women's Third League season, and netted 24 goals. The next season, she moved to Aydın to join İncirliova Belediyespor. After scoring 67 goals in 26 games, she transferred to Horozkent Spor in Denizli in the second half of the 2017–18 Women's Third League season. After scoring 16 goals in seven matches for Horozkent, Öztürk returned to her former club İncirliova Belediyespor for the 2018–19 Third League season, where she netted 13 goals in eight games.

=== Ataşehir Belediyespor ===
By early August 2019, Öztürk signed with the Istanbul-based Ataşehir Belediyespor to play in the Women's First League. She scored five goals in 15 matches of the 2019-20 season, which was discontinued due to the outbreak of COVID-19 pandemic in Turkey.

=== Beşiktaş ===
In the 2021 Turkcell League season, she transferred to Beşiktaş J.K., and enjoyed her team's champions title. She played in two matches of the 2021–22 UEFA Women's Champions League qualifying rounds.

=== Galatasaray ===
On August 1, 2025, she signed a contract with the Turkish giant Galatasaray.

== International career ==
=== Turkey girls' U-17 ===
Öztürk was admitted to the Turkey girls' U-17 team debuting in the match against Portugal in the UEFA Development Tournament on 13 May 2016. She appeared in 2017 UEFA Women's U-17 Championship qualification - Group 7, 2018 UEFA Women's U-17 Championship qualification - Group 7 and Elite round Group 6 matches. She capped in a total of 25 matches and scored 13 goals for the Turkey girls' U-17 team.

=== Turkey women's U-19 ===
She was called up to the Turkey women's U-19 team for the friendly match against Poland on 28 August 2018. She took part at the 2019 UEFA Women's U-19 Championship qualification - Group 2 and Elite round Group 6 as well as 2020 UEFA Women's U-19 Championship qualification - Group 12 matches. She played in 14 games and scored two goals total.

=== Turkey women's ===
Öztürk was first named for the Turkey women's team in the beginning of Deceöber 2019. In the away match against Slovenia in the UEFA Women's Euro 2021 qualifying Group A, she sat on the bench. She played in the same tournament's home match against Kosovo on 23 October 2020.

== Career statistics ==
=== Club ===
As of match played 9 March 2022.

Club	Season	League			Continental		National		Total	
Club	Season	Division	Apps	Goals	Apps	Goals	Apps	Goals	Apps	Goals
Denizli Dumlupınar Üni. GS	2015–16	Third League	12	24	–	–	3	0	15	24
Denizli Dumlupınar Üni. GS	Total		12	24	–	–	3	0	15	24
İncirliova Belediyespor	2016–17	Third League	19	47	–	–	8	3	27	50
İncirliova Belediyespor	2017–18	Third League	7	20	–	–	11	8	18	28
İncirliova Belediyespor	Total		26	67	–	–	19	11	45	78
Horozkent Spor	2017–18	Third League	7	16	–	–	3	2	10	18
Horozkent Spor	Total		7	16	–	–	3	2	10	18
İncirliova Belediyespor	2018–19	Third League	8	13	–	–	10	2	18	15
İncirliova Belediyespor	Total		8	13	–	–	10	2	18	15
Ataşehir Belediyespor	2019-20	First League	15	5	–	–	4	0	19	5
Ataşehir Belediyespor	2020-21	First League	0	0	–	–	2	0	2	0
Ataşehir Belediyespor	Total		15	5	–	–	6	0	21	5
Beşiktaş J.K.	2020–21	First League	6	2	0	0	1	0	7	2
Beşiktaş J.K.	2021–22	Super League	11	3	2	0	6	0	19	3
Beşiktaş J.K.	Total		17	5	2	0	7	0	26	5
Career total			85	130	2	0	48	15	135	145

=== International ===
International goals (Friendly match goals not included)
Date	Venue	Opponent	Result	Competition	Scored
Turkey girls' U-17 team
12 May 2017	Municipal Stadium, Seia, Portugal	Russia	W 2–1	2017 UEFA Development Tournament	1
14 May 2017	Municipal Stadium, Seia, Portuga	Portugal	L 6-7	2017 UEFA Development Tournament	2
1 Luly 2017	Rīgas Hanzas vidusskola, Riga, Latvia	Latvia	W 7–0	2017 UEFA Development Tournament	2
4 October 2017	Kadrioru Stadium, Tallinn, Estonia	Czech Republic	L 1-2	2018 UEFA Women's U-17 Champ qualification Gr. 7	1
25 March 2018	Novi Gradski Stadion, Ugljevik, Bosnia Herzegovina	Bosnia and Herzegovina	D 2-2	2018 UEFA Women's U-17 Champ qualification - Elite round Gr. 6	2
Turkey women's U-19 team
3 October 2018	Arslan Zeki Demirci Sports Complex, Antalya, Turkey	Azerbaijan	W 2–0	2019 UEFA Women's U-19 Champ qualification - Gr. 2	2

== Honours ==
Turkish Women's First League

Beşiktaş J.K.
Winners (1): 2020–21
