= Portugal women's national under-17 football team =

National U-17 association football team

Portugal Women's U-17
- Association: FPF
- Confederation: UEFA (Europe)
- Head coach: José Paisana
- FIFA code: POR

First international
- Portugal 2–2 Hungary; Caldas da Rainha, Portugal; 7 May 2013

Biggest win
- Portugal 12–0 Ukraine; Tallinn, Estonia; 19 April 2015

Biggest defeat
- Portugal 0–6 Spain; Albena, Bulgaria; 11 May 2019

UEFA Women's Under-17 Championship
- Appearances: 3 (first in 2014)
- Best result: Semi-finals (2019)

The Portuguese women's national under-17 football team represents Portugal in international youth football competitions.

== FIFA U-17 Women's World Cup ==
The team has never qualified for the FIFA U-17 Women's World Cup

FIFA U-17 Women's World Cup record
Year	Result	Pld	W	D*	L	GF	GA
(New Zealand) 2008 – (Morocco) 2025	did not qualify						
(Morocco) 2026	To be determined						
Total	0/9	0	0	0	0	0	0

== UEFA Women's Under-17 Championship ==
Portugal have qualified for two UEFA Women's Under-17 Championships with their best performance being a semi-final finish in the UEFA Euro 2019.

UEFA Women's Under-17 Championship record
Year	Result	Pld	W	D*	L	GF	GA
2008-2013	did not qualify						
(England) 2014	Group stage	3	0	1	2	1	8
2015–2018	did not qualify						
(Bulgaria) 2019	Semi-finals	4	2	0	2	4	9
~~2020~~-~~2021~~	Cancelled						
(Bosnia and Herzegovina) 2022	did not qualify						
(Estonia) 2023	did not qualify						
(Sweden) 2024	Group stage	3	1	1	1	2	4
(Faroe Islands) 2025	Did not qualify						
(Northern Ireland) 2026	Did not qualify						
(Finland) 2027	to be determined						
(Belgium) 2028	to be determined						
(Turkey) 2029	to be determined						
Total	3/16	10	3	2	5	7	21
