= Nikolina Plavšić =

Serbian footballer (born 2001)

Personal information
- Date of birth: 19 December 2001 (age 24)
- Place of birth: Serbia, FR Yugoslavia
- Height: 1.73 m (5 ft 8 in)
- Position: Forward

Senior career*
| Years | Team | Apps | (Gls) |
| 2017–2022 | Vojvodina | | |
| 2022–2024 | Mura | | |
| 2024 | Vojvodina | 8 | (5) |
| 2024- | Amed | 11 | (2) |

International career
| 2017–2018 | Serbia U17 | | (1) |
| 2018–2019 | Serbia U19 | 5 | (3) |
- * Club domestic league appearances and goals as of 22 December 2024

Nikolina Plavšić (Serbian: Николина Плавшић; born 19 December 2001) is a Serbian women's football forward who plays for Amed in the Turkish Super League.

== Club career ==
Plavšić is 1.73 m (5 ft 8 in) tall. She plays in the center-forward position.

Plavšić started her football career entering Vojvodina Novi Sad in 2017. She played six years for the team until the end of the 2022 season.

In 2022, she moved to Slovenia, and signed with Mura from Murska Sobota, which had become champion of the Slovenian Women's League. She took part at the 2023–24 UEFA Women's Champions League qualifying rounds. She scored one penalty shoot-out goal in the overtime of the match against Samegrelo from Georgia. She netted two goals in the game with the Macedonian Ljuboten.

Returning home, she re-joined her club Vojvodin. She scored five goals in eight matches in the Serbian Super League.

In September 2024, Plavšić moved to Turkey, and signed with the Diyarbakır-based club Amed to play in the Super League.

== International career ==
Plavšić was admitted to the Serbia U17 team, and took part at the 2017 winter preparation camp. She played at the 2018 UEFA Women's Under-17 Championship qualification, and scored a goal against Czech Republic.

She became a member of the Serbia U19 team, and played at the 2019 UEFA Women's Under-19 Championship qualification scoring one goal against Liechtenstein. At the 2020 UEFA Women's Under-19 Championship qualification, she netted two goals against Belarus.
