= Kazakhstan women's national under-17 football team =

Kazakhstan Women's U-17
- Association: KFF
- Confederation: UEFA (Europe)
- Head coach: Orynbassar Daurenbekova
- FIFA code: KAZ

First international
- England 6–2 Kazakhstan (26 October 2009)

Biggest win
- Liechtenstein 0–8 Kazakhstan (24 October 2011)

Biggest defeat
- France 17–0 Kazakhstan (10 October 2016)

The Kazakhstan women's national under-17 football team represents Kazakhstan in international youth football competitions.

== FIFA U-17 Women's World Cup ==
The team has never qualified for the FIFA U-17 Women's World Cup

Year	Result	Matches	Wins	Draws*	Losses	GF	GA
(New Zealand) 2008	Did not qualify						
(Trinidad and Tobago) 2010	Did not qualify						
(Azerbaijan) 2012	Did not qualify						
(Costa Rica) 2014	Did not qualify						
(Jordan) 2016	Did not qualify						
(Uruguay) 2018	Did not qualify						
(India) 2022	Did not qualify						
(Dominican Republic) 2024	Did not qualify						
(Morocco) 2025	Did not qualify						
Total	0/9	0	0	0	0	0	0

== UEFA Women's Under-17 Championship ==
The team has never qualified

Year	Result	MP	W	D	L	GF	GA
(Switzerland) 2008	Did not enter						
(Switzerland) 2009	Did not enter						
(Switzerland) 2010	Did not qualify						
(Switzerland) 2011	Did not qualify						
(Switzerland) 2012	Did not qualify						
(Switzerland) 2013	Did not qualify						
(England) 2014	Did not qualify						
(Iceland) 2015	Did not qualify						
(Belarus) 2016	Did not qualify						
(Czech Republic) 2017	Did not qualify						
(Lithuania) 2018	Did not qualify						
(Bulgaria) 2019	Did not qualify						
(Sweden) ~~2020~~	Cancelled						
(Faroe Islands) ~~2021~~	Cancelled						
(Bosnia and Herzegovina) 2022	Did not qualify						
(Estonia) 2023	Did not qualify						
(Sweden) 2024	Did not qualify						
(Faroe Islands) 2025	Did not qualify						
(Northern Ireland) 2026	Did not qualify						
(Finland) 2027	to be determined						
(Belgium) 2028	to be determined						
(Turkey) 2029	to be determined						
Total	0/16	0	0	0	0	0	0

== UEFA Women's Under-17 Championship Qualification ==
#	Year	M	W	D	L	GF	GA	GD
1	2008 UEFA Women's Under-17 Championship	DNE						
2	2009 UEFA Women's Under-17 Championship	3	1	0	2	3	18	-15
3	2010 UEFA Women's Under-17 Championship	3	1	0	2	3	9	-6
4	2011 UEFA Women's Under-17 Championship	3	0	1	2	1	17	-16
5	2012 UEFA Women's Under-17 Championship qualification	3	0	0	3	0	17	-17
6	2013 UEFA Women's Under-17 Championship qualification	3	0	0	3	1	21	-20
7	2014 UEFA Women's Under-17 Championship qualification	3	0	0	3	0	21	-21
8	2015 UEFA Women's Under-17 Championship qualification	3	0	0	3	0	17	-17
9	2016 UEFA Women's Under-17 Championship qualification	3	0	1	2	1	7	-6
10	2017 UEFA Women's Under-17 Championship qualification	3	0	0	3	0	28	-28
11	2018 UEFA Women's Under-17 Championship qualification	3	0	0	3	0	26	-26
12	2019 UEFA Women's Under-17 Championship qualification	3	0	0	3	1	17	-16
13	2020 UEFA Women's Under-17 Championship qualification	3	0	0	3	0	25	-25
14	2021 UEFA Women's Under-17 Championship qualification	Cancelled						
15	2022 UEFA Women's Under-17 Championship qualification	5	1	1	3	6	29	-23
16	2023 UEFA Women's Under-17 Championship qualification	5	1	0	4	2	22	-20
17	2024 UEFA Women's Under-17 Championship qualification	6	1	0	5	9	9	0
18	2025 UEFA Women's Under-17 Championship qualification	TBD						
Total	15/16	52	5	3	44	27	283	-256

== See also ==
- Kazakhstan women's national football team
