= Velkov =

Velkov (Bulgarian: Велков) is a Bulgarian and Macedonian masculine surname, its feminine counterpart is Velkova. It may refer to

- Anton Velkov (born 1968), Bulgarian football player and manager
- Katrin Velkova (born 1991), Bulgarian rhythmic gymnast
- Kostadin Velkov (born 1989), Bulgarian football player
- Rositsa Velkova-Zheleva (born 1972), Bulgarian politician
- Sara Velkova (born 2002), Macedonian footballer
- Stefan Velkov (born 1996), Bulgarian football defender
