= Dženita =

Female given name

- Gender: Female

Origin
- Meaning: Heaven

Other names
- Variant forms: Dženet, Dženana, Dženisa, Đenita, Dženeta
- Nickname: Dženi

Dženita is a female given name.

In the Balkans, Dženita is popular among Bosniaks in the former Yugoslav nations. The name is derived from the Arabic word jannah (جَنَّة), which translates to "heaven."

== Given name ==
- Dženita Ramčilović (born 2001), Montenegrin footballer
- Dženita Zekić (born 1976), Bosnian singer-songwriter

== Places ==
- Dženita, famous Sarajevo restaurant located in Baščaršija
