= Maria Dias =

Maria Dias may refer to:

- Maria Dias (footballer), Brazilian footballer
- Maria Berenice Dias, Brazilian judge
- Maria Helena da Costa Dias, Portuguese writer
