= Dilan Yeşim Taşkın =

Turkish footballer (born 2001)

Personal information
- Date of birth: 17 October 2001 (age 25)
- Place of birth: Waidhofen an der Thaya, Lower Austria
- Height: 1.70 m (5 ft 7 in)
- Position: Defender

Team information
- Current team: Beşiktaş J.K.
- Number: 4

Senior career*
Years	Team	Apps	(Gls)
2015–2016	SV Neulengbach Juniors 18	21	(0)
2016–2018	SKN St. Pöltenn KM II	46	(2)
2019–2*2*	SV Horn	28	(1)
2022–	Beşiktaş J.K.	1	(0)

International career^{‡}
2017–2018	Turkey U17	10	(1)
2018–2019	Turkey U19	13	(0)
2020–	Turkey	3	(1)
- * Club domestic league appearances and goals as of 16 October 2022 ‡ National team caps and goals as of 30 November 2021

Dilan Yeşim Taşkın (born 17 October 2001) is a footballer who plays as a defender for Turkish Women's Super League club Beşiktaş J.K. and the Turkey women's national team. Born in Austria, she represents Turkey at international level.

== Early and personal life ==
Dilan Yeşim Taşkın was born to Turkish parents in Waidhofen an der Thaya, Lower Austria, Austria on 17 October 2001. She studied at "Höhere Lehranstalt für wirtschaftliche Berufe" (Public higher educational facility for professions in economics) in Sankt Pölten. She lives in Schrems, Lower Austria.

In March 2020, Taşkın started an insurance advisor business in Gmünd.

== Club career ==
Taşkın began playing football at the age of five. She played futsal in the girls' under-1010 team of JHG Waldviertel in Waldviertel, Lower Austria. Until the age of 13, she played for ASV Schrems in various age categories together with boys. In November 2014, she took part in the "Bundesländer Nachwuchs Meisterschaft Frauen U14" (Federal states young talent championship girls' under-14).

In 2015, she transferred to SV Neulengbach Juniors 18, and capped in 21 games. In May 2016, she played for NMS Schrems in the "Uniqa Landesfinale Niederösterreich" ("State finals Lower Austria"), and was named a member of the "dream team" after the match.

By October 2016, she joined SKN St. Pöltenn KM II, scoring two goals in 46 matches in two seasons. On 1 February 2019, she moved to SV Horn.

The 1.70 m (5 ft 7 in) tall sportswoman at 59 kg (130 lb) plays in defender position.

In September 2022, she moved to Turkey and joined Istanbul-based club Beşiktaş J.K. to play in the 2022-23 Women's Super League.

== International career ==
She was discovered for the Turkey national team by a Turkish talent scout during an away match of her team in Vienna. Without further examination, just based on what the talent scout had observed during the match in Vienna, she was called up to the women's national team of Turkey. Her mother Nilüfer supported the young girl in her decision.

By September 2017, she was called up to the Turkey girls' national under-15 team camp. However, she did not play in any competition that took place later, due to her advanced age.

She was admitted to the Turkey girls' national U17 team, debuting on 1 October 2017. She took part in three 2018 UEFA Women's U17 Championship qualification - Group 7 matches, and three Elite round - Group 6 matches. She scored one goal in ten games for the Turkey girls' U17 team.

On 30 August 2018, she played for the first time in the Turkey women's U19 team. She participated in two of the 2019 UEFA Women's U19 Championship qualification - Group 2 matches and three of the Elite round - Group 6 matches, as well as in two of the 2020 UEFA Women's U19 Championship qualification - Group 12 matches. She capped in 13 games for the Turkey women's U19 team.

By September 2020, she was called up to the Turkey women's national team. She debuted at the UEFA Women's Euro 2021 qualifying Group A match against Slovenia on 18 September 2020.

== Career statistics ==
No.	Date	Venue	Opponent	Score	Result	Competition
1.	30 November 2021	Mersin Arena, Mersin, Turkey	Israel	2–2	3–2	2023 FIFA Women's World Cup qualification

== Honours ==
By the end of February 2020, she was honored with the "Gute Seele des Sports" ("Good soul of sport") award of the Niederösterreichische Nachrichten (NÖN) in the women's category that is determined by the readers of the regional weekly newspaper.
