= Wales women's national under-17 football team =

National association football team

Wales Under-17
- Nickname: Young Dragons (Welsh: Dreigiau Ifanc)
- Association: Football Association of Wales (FAW)
- Confederation: UEFA (Europe)
- Head coach: Lauren Smith
- FIFA code: WAL
First colours	Second colours

First international
- Wales 10–0 Cyprus (Frauenfeld, Switzerland; 11 October 2007)

Biggest win
- Wales 10–0 Cyprus (Frauenfeld, Switzerland; 11 October 2007)

Biggest defeat
- Wales 1–7 Denmark (Brøndby, Denmark; 10 August 2013)

The Wales women's national under-17 football team represents Wales in international women's youth football competitions.

== FIFA U-17 Women's World Cup ==
The team has never qualified for the FIFA U-17 Women's World Cup

Year	Result	Matches	Wins	Draws*	Losses	GF	GA
(New Zealand) 2008	did not qualify						
(Trinidad and Tobago) 2010	did not qualify						
(Azerbaijan) 2012	did not qualify						
(Costa Rica) 2014	did not qualify						
(Jordan) 2016	did not qualify						
(Uruguay) 2018	did not qualify						
(India) 2022	did not qualify						
(Dominican Republic) 2024	did not qualify						
(Morocco) 2025	To be determined						
Total	0/8	0	0	0	0	0	0

== UEFA Women's Under-17 Championship ==
The team has never qualified for the UEFA Women's Under-17 Championship tournaments.

Year	Round	Position	GP	W	D	L
(Switzerland) 2008	did not qualify					
(Switzerland) 2009	did not qualify					
(Switzerland) 2010	did not qualify					
(Switzerland) 2011	did not qualify					
(Switzerland) 2012	did not qualify					
(Switzerland) 2013	did not qualify					
(England) 2014	did not qualify					
(Iceland) 2015	did not qualify					
(Belarus) 2016	did not qualify					
(Czech Republic) 2017	did not qualify					
(Lithuania) 2018	did not qualify					
(Bulgaria) 2019	did not qualify					
(Sweden) 2020	Cancelled due to the COVID-19 pandemic					
(Faroe Islands) 2021	Cancelled due to the COVID-19 pandemic					
(Bosnia and Herzegovina) 2022	did not qualify					
(Estonia) 2023	did not qualify					
(Sweden) 2024	did not qualify					
(Faroe Islands) 2025	did not qualify					
(Northern Ireland) 2026	did not qualify					
(Finland) 2027	to be determined					
(Belgium) 2028	to be determined					
(Turkey) 2029	to be determined					
Total	0/15	0	0	0	0	0

== See also ==
- Wales women's national under-19 football team
- Wales women's national football team
