= Bosnia and Herzegovina women's national under-17 football team =

National U-17 association football team

Bosnia and Herzegovina Women's U-17
- Association: Football Federation of Bosnia and Herzegovina
- Confederation: UEFA (Europe)
- Head coach: Ilija Lucić
- FIFA code: BIH
First colours	Second colours

Biggest win
- North Macedonia 0–7 Bosnia and Herzegovina (Skopje, North Macedonia; 26 September 2018)

Biggest defeat
- Republic of Ireland 12–1 Bosnia and Herzegovina (Ulyanovsk, Russia; 6 August 2013)

UEFA Women's Under-17 Championship
- Appearances: 1 (first in 2022)
- Best result: Group Stage (2022)

The Bosnia and Herzegovina women's national under-17 football team represents Bosnia and Herzegovina in international football's under-17 categories and is controlled by the Football Association of Bosnia and Herzegovina.

== Competitive record ==
=== UEFA Women's Under-17 Championship record ===
UEFA European U17 Championship record									UEFA European U17 Championship Qualification record					
Year	Round	Position	Pld	W	D	L	GF	GA	Pld	W	D	L	GF	GA
(Switzerland) 2008	Did not enter								–	–	–	–	–	–
(Switzerland) 2009	Did not enter								–	–	–	–	–	–
(Switzerland) 2010	Did not enter								–	–	–	–	–	–
(Switzerland) 2011	Did not enter								–	–	–	–	–	–
(Switzerland) 2012	Did not qualify								3	2	0	1	5	8
(Switzerland) 2013	Did not qualify								3	1	1	1	8	8
(England) 2014	Did not qualify								3	0	0	3	1	16
(Iceland) 2015	Did not qualify								3	1	0	2	1	13
(Belarus) 2016	Did not qualify								3	0	2	1	1	6
(Czech Republic) 2017	Did not qualify								3	2	0	1	9	5
(Lithuania) 2018	Did not qualify								6	2	1	3	4	10
(Bulgaria) 2019	Did not qualify								3	1	0	2	7	7
(Sweden) 2020	Did not qualify; tournament cancelled								3	0	1	2	2	7
(Faroe Islands) 2021	Cancelled								Qualification cancelled					
(Bosnia and Herzegovina) 2022	Group stage	8th	3	0	0	3	0	16	2	1	0	1	6	2
(Estonia) 2023	Did not qualify								3	0	1	2	0	4
(Sweden) 2024	Did not qualify								3	0	0	3	1	12
Total	Group stage	1/15	3	0	0	3	0	16	38	10	4	22	45	98

== Current squad ==
No.	Pos.	Player	Date of birth (age)	Caps	Goals	Club

== See also ==
- Bosnia and Herzegovina women's national football team
- Bosnia and Herzegovina women's national under-19 football team
- UEFA Women's Championship
- UEFA Women's Under-17 Championship
- FIFA U-17 Women's World Cup
- Football Association of Bosnia and Herzegovina
