= Anđela Krstić =

Serbian footballer (born 2001)

Personal information
- Date of birth: 4 June 2001 (age 25)
- Place of birth: Paraćin, Serbia
- Height: 1.76 m (5 ft 9 in)
- Position: Centre-back

Team information
- Current team: Paris Saint-Germain
- Number: 3

Youth career
- ŠF Vuk
- 2012–2016: Red Star Belgrade

Senior career*
Years	Team	Apps	(Gls)
2016–2024	Red Star Belgrade		
2024–2026	Basel	24	(2)
2026–	Paris Saint-Germain	0	(0)

International career^{‡}
- Serbia U17
- Serbia U19
2022–	Serbia	12	(0)
- * Club domestic league appearances and goals as of 9 September 2026 ‡ National team caps and goals as of 9 September 2026

Anđela Krstić (Serbian Cyrillic: Анђела Крстић; born 4 June 2001) is a Serbian professional footballer who plays as a centre-back for Première Ligue club Paris Saint-Germain and the Serbia national team. She has previously been a member of Serbian Women's Super League club Red Star Belgrade and Swiss Women's Super League club FC Basel.

== Club career ==
=== Red Star Belgrade ===
Krstić was born in Paraćin, Serbia. She was inspired by her brother to participate in football and played lots of indoor football as a child. Her first club was local team ŠF Vuk, where she played for the first 9 years of her career. Krstić then joined Red Star Belgrade, where she made her senior team debut at a young age. She became an official member of Belgrade's first team in 2016. Operating as a left-back, Krstić contributed both offensively and defensively and was Red Star Belgrade's second top scorer in the 2018–19 season. In her final season with the club, Krstić scored 11 goals in 14 games as Belgrade won both the Serbian Women's Super League and Serbian Women's Cup.

=== FC Basel ===
On 12 June 2024, Swiss Women's Super League club FC Basel announced the signing of Krstić on a two-season deal. She became a regular in defense for Basel over her two seasons in Switzerland. In her first campaign with Basel, she helped the club reach the league playoff semifinals; she scored an Olimpico goal in the eventual defeat to Grasshopper Club Zurich after opposing goalkeeper Lauren Kozal misjudged the flight of the ball.

In the 2025–26 season, Krstić contributed to another playoff run with Basel. In May 2026, she helped the team beat St. Gallen on penalties in the quarterfinal and subsequently celebrated with fans while holding a pyrotechnic device. However, Basel were prevented from moving onto the semifinals after having made a substitution error in the previous match. Once the summer arrived, Krstić departed from Basel upon the expiration of her contract. She had made 37 total appearances for the club, including 24 in the league and over 10 in the UEFA Women's Champions League, and had scored twice.

=== Paris Saint-Germain ===
In September 2026, French side Paris Saint-Germain signed Krstić to a three-year contract until June 2029.

== International career ==
Krstić has represented Serbia as a member of the under-17 and under-19 national teams. She earned her first experiences with the senior national team in 2022, while playing for Red Star Belgrade. She scored her first senior international goal on 7 April 2022, helping Serbia beat Israel, 4–0, in a FIFA Women's World Cup qualification match. Although Serbia would not end up qualifying for the 2023 World Cup, Krstić would end up playing for her country in the inaugural UEFA Women's Nations League that same year.

== Honours ==
Red Star Belgrade

- Serbian Women's Super League: 2023–24
- Serbian Women's Cup: 2024
