= Iceland women's national under-17 football team =

Iceland Women's U-17
- Association: KSI
- Confederation: UEFA (Europe)
- FIFA code: ISL

First international
- Iceland 7–1 Latvia; 17 September 2009

Biggest win
- Iceland 14–0 Lithuania; 20 September 2010

Biggest defeat
- Iceland 2–8 Germany; 31 July 2011

Iceland women's national under-17 football team represents Iceland in international youth football competitions.

== Competitive record ==
=== FIFA U-17 Women's World Cup ===
The team has never qualified for the FIFA U-17 Women's World Cup

Year	Result	Matches	Wins	Draws*	Losses	GF	GA
(New Zealand) 2008	Did not qualify						
(Trinidad and Tobago) 2010	Did not qualify						
(Azerbaijan) 2012	Did not qualify						
(Costa Rica) 2014	Did not qualify						
(Jordan) 2016	Did not qualify						
(Uruguay) 2018	Did not qualify						
(India) 2022	Did not qualify						
(Dominican Republic) 2024	Did not qualify						
(Morocco) 2025	Did not qualify						
(Morocco) 2026	Did not qualify						
(Morocco) 2027	To be determined						
(Morocco) 2028	To be determined						
(Morocco) 2029	To be determined						
Total	0/9	0	0	0	0	0	0

=== UEFA Women's Under-17 Championship ===
The team have qualified for the UEFA Women's Under-17 Championship twice in 2011 and 2015.

Year	Result	MP	W	D	L	GF	GA
(Switzerland) 2008	Did not qualify						
(Switzerland) 2009	Did not qualify						
(Switzerland) 2010	Did not qualify						
(Switzerland) 2011	Fourth place	2	0	0	2	2	12
(Switzerland) 2012	Did not qualify						
(Switzerland) 2013	Did not qualify						
(England) 2014	Did not qualify						
(Iceland) 2015	Group-stage	3	0	0	3	1	10
(Belarus) 2016	Did not qualify						
(Czech Republic) 2017	Did not qualify						
(Lithuania) 2018	Did not qualify						
(Bulgaria) 2019	Did not qualify						
(Sweden) ~~2020~~	Cancelled						
(Faroe Islands) ~~2021~~	Cancelled						
(Bosnia and Herzegovina) 2022	Did not qualify						
(Estonia) 2023	Did not qualify						
(Sweden) 2024	Did not qualify						
(Faroe Islands) 2025	Did not qualify						
(Northern Ireland) 2026	Did not qualify						
(Finland) 2027	TBD						
(Belgium) 2028	TBD						
(Turkey) 2029	TBD						
Total	2/16	5	0	0	5	3	22

== See also ==
- Iceland women's national football team
