= Emilie Bernhardt =

German association football player (born 2002)

Personal information
- Date of birth: 5 May 2002 (age 24)
- Place of birth: Ingolstadt, Germany
- Position: Defender

Team information
- Current team: 1. FFC Turbine Potsdam

Youth career
- 2017–2018: FC Ingolstadt 04

Senior career*
Years	Team	Apps	(Gls)
2018–2020	FC Bayern Munich II	28	(1)
2021	FC Ingolstadt 04	8	(1)
2021–2024	Werder Bremen	30	(0)
2024–	1. FFC Turbine Potsdam	20	(0)

International career
2016–2017	Germany U15	4	(0)
2017	Germany U16	3	(0)
2018–2019	Germany U17	24	(3)
2019–2020	Germany U19	5	(0)
2021–	Germany U20	2	(0)
- * Club domestic league appearances and goals

Emilie Bernhardt (born May 5, 2002, in Ingolstadt) is a German football defender for Bundesliga club 1. FFC Turbine Potsdam.

== Career ==
=== Club ===
Having emerged from the FC Ingolstadt 04 youth team, Bernhardt joined FC Bayern Munich's reserve team in 2018. By the end of the 2019/20 season, she had played 28 league matches in the single-tier 2. Bundesliga and scored one goal.

Afterwards, until the end of 2020, she began studying at the University of Central Florida and was announced as a member of their soccer team, the UCF Knights.

After returning to Germany, she played the second half of the 2020/21 season for FC Ingolstadt 04 in the two-tier 2. Bundesliga, where she played in eight league matches and immediately scored a goal in her first competitive match.

For the 2021/22 season, she was signed by Bundesliga club Werder Bremen, for whom she made her debut on August 29, 2021.

For the 2024/25 season, Bernhardt moved to first division newly promoted 1. FFC Turbine Potsdam.

=== National ===
From 2015 to 2017, Bernhardt played in a total of 14 matches for Bavarian state and regional teams in the U14, U16, and U18 age groups, scoring three goals and one in each age group.

On December 11, 2016, she made her first international appearance for the U15 Germany national team. She and her team won the friendly against Belgium in Tubize with a score of 2–0. From then on, she progressed through the youth national teams in the U16, U17, and U19 age groups. With the U17 national team, she took part in the 2018 European Championship held in Lithuania. She played in all five tournament matches, including the final on May 21, 2018, in Marijampolė, which was lost 2–0 to Spain. At the 2018 World Cup held in Uruguay, she played in all three group stage matches and the quarter-final in Montevideo, where they were eliminated in a 1–0 loss to Canada. She also took part in the 2019 European Championship, held in her home country, and contributed to her team's title win.

== Honours ==
Bayern Munich II

- 2. Frauen-Bundesliga: 2018–19

Germany

- UEFA Women's Under-17 Championship: 2019
