= Czech Republic women's national under-17 football team =

National association football team

Czechia Women's U-17
- Association: Fotbalová asociace České republiky (FAČR)
- Confederation: UEFA (Europe)
- Head coach: Michal Kolomazník
- Captain: Lucie Bendová
- FIFA code: CZE
First colours	Second colours

First international
- Poland 2–1 Czech Republic (Poland; July 29, 2000)

Biggest win
- Czech Republic 18–0 Lithuania (Marijampolė, Lithuania; 9 October 2009)

Biggest defeat
- Czech Republic 1–6 Finland (Prague, Czech Republic; 1 July, 2024)

UEFA Women's Under-17 Championship
- Appearances: 2 (first in 2016)
- Best result: Group stage (2016, 2017)

The Czech Republic women's national under-17 football team is the national under-17 football team of Czech Republic and is governed by the Fotbalová asociace České republiky (FAČR).

== Competitive record ==
=== FIFA Women's Under-17 World Cup ===
Year	Result	Matches	Wins	Draws*	Losses	GF	GA
(New Zealand) 2008	did not qualify						
(Trinidad and Tobago) 2010	did not qualify						
(Azerbaijan) 2012	did not qualify						
(Costa Rica) 2014	did not qualify						
(Jordan) 2016	did not qualify						
(Uruguay) 2018	did not qualify						
(India) 2022	did not qualify						
(Dominican Republic) 2024	did not qualify						
(Morocco) 2025	did not qualify						
Total	0/9	0	0	0	0	0	0

=== UEFA Women's Under-17 Championship ===
Year	Result	MP	W	D	L	GF	GA
(Switzerland) 2008	did not qualify						
(Switzerland) 2009	did not qualify						
(Switzerland) 2010	did not qualify						
(Switzerland) 2011	did not qualify						
(Switzerland) 2012	did not qualify						
(Switzerland) 2013	did not qualify						
(England) 2014	did not qualify						
(Iceland) 2015	did not qualify						
(Belarus) 2016	Group Stage	3	0	1	2	0	5
(Czech Republic) 2017	Group Stage	3	0	0	3	3	12
(Lithuania) 2018	did not qualify						
(Bulgaria) 2019	did not qualify						
(Sweden) ~~2020~~	Cancelled						
(Faroe Islands) ~~2021~~	Cancelled						
(Bosnia and Herzegovina) 2022	did not qualify						
(Estonia) 2023	did not qualify						
(Sweden) 2024	did not qualify						
(Faroe Islands) 2025	did not qualify						
(Northern Ireland) 2026	did not qualify						
(Finland) 2027	to be determined						
(Belgium) 2028	to be determined						
(Turkey) 2029	to be determined						
Total	2/16	6	0	1	5	3	17
