= Beatrix Fördős =

Hungarian footballer (born 2002)

Personal information
- Date of birth: 7 January 2002 (age 24)
- Place of birth: Szombathely, Hungary
- Position: Defender

Team information
- Current team: 1. FC Nürnberg; (on loan from Inter Milan)
- Number: 27

Senior career*
Years	Team	Apps	(Gls)
2021–2022	Lazio	20	(2)
2022–	Inter Milan	19	(0)
2025–	→ 1. FC Nürnberg (loan)	22	(1)

International career
2022–	Hungary	6	(0)
- * Club domestic league appearances and goals as of 16:07, 24 May 2026 (UTC)

Beatrix Fördős (born 7 January 2002) is a Hungarian footballer who plays as a defender for Frauen-Bundesliga club 1. FC Nürnberg on loan from Inter Milan and the Hungary national team.
