= Israel women's national under-17 football team =

National association football team

Israel Women's U-17
- Association: Israel Football Association
- Confederation: UEFA (Europe)
- Head coach: Guy Azouri
- Most caps: Noam Kedem (14)
- Top scorer: Gina Mishel (3)
- FIFA code: ISR
First colours	Second colours

UEFA Women's Under-17 Championship
- Appearances: 0

FIFA U-17 Women's World Cup
- Appearances: 0

Israel women's national under-17 football team is the football team representing Israel in competitions for under-17 year old players and is controlled by the Israel Football Association. The team is yet to appear in the UEFA Women's Under-17 Championship.

The team participated in the 2013 Maccabiah Games, in the junior girls tournament, winning the silver medals, after winning matches against Canada, Brazil, Sweden, South Africa and Australia and losing their final match against the U.S.A.

== Competitive record ==
=== UEFA Women's Under-17 Championship ===
UEFA Women's Under-17 Championship									Qualification record						
Year	Round	Pld	W	D	L	GF	GA	GD	Pld	W	D	L	GF	GA	GD
(Switzerland) 2008	Did not qualify								3	1	0	2	1	18	−17
(Switzerland) 2009	Did not qualify								3	0	1	2	0	8	−8
(Switzerland) 2010	Did not qualify								3	0	0	3	0	25	−25
(Switzerland) 2011	Did not qualify								3	0	1	2	2	13	−11
(Switzerland) 2012	Did not qualify								3	1	0	2	3	12	−9
(Switzerland) 2013	Did not qualify								3	0	0	3	1	14	−13
(England) 2014	Did not qualify								3	0	0	3	1	12	−11
(Iceland) 2015	Did not qualify								3	1	0	2	2	4	−2
(Belarus) 2016	Did not qualify								3	0	0	3	0	12	−12
(Czech Republic) 2017	Did not qualify								3	0	0	3	0	4	−4
(Lithuania) 2018	Did not qualify								6	1	1	4	3	12	−9
(Bulgaria) 2019	Did not qualify								3	0	0	3	0	8	−8
(Bosnia and Herzegovina) 2022	Did not qualify								2	1	0	1	5	7	−2
(Estonia) 2023	Did not qualify								2	1	0	1	4	5	−1
(Sweden) 2024	Did not qualify								3	2	0	1	11	5	+6
(Faroe Islands) 2025	Did not qualify								5	1	1	3	7	8	−1
Total	0/15	0	0	0	0	0	0	0	51	9	4	38	40	167	−127
