= Azerbaijan women's national under-17 football team =

Azerbaijan Women's U-17
- Nickname(s): Odlar Yurdu (The Land of Fire)
- Association: AFFA
- Confederation: UEFA (Europe)
- Head coach: Siyasat Asgarov
- FIFA code: AZE
First colours	Second colours

FIFA U-17 Women's World Cup
- Appearances: 1 (first in 2012)
- Best result: Group Stage (2012)

Republic of Azerbaijan women's national under-17 football team represents Azerbaijan in international youth football competitions.

== FIFA U-17 Women's World Cup ==
Year	Round	Pld	W	D	L	GF	GA
(New Zealand) 2008	Did not qualify						
(Trinidad and Tobago) 2010	Did not qualify						
(Azerbaijan) 2012	Group stage	3	0	0	3	0	16
(Costa Rica) 2014	Did not qualify						
(Jordan) 2016	Did not qualify						
(Uruguay) 2018	Did not qualify						
(India) 2022	Did not qualify						
(Dominican Republic) 2024	Did not qualify						
(Morocco) 2025	Did not qualify						
(Morocco) 2026	To be determined						
(Morocco) 2027	To be determined						
(Morocco) 2028	To be determined						
(Morocco) 2029	To be determined						
Total	1/13	3	0	0	3	0	16

== UEFA Women's Under-17 Championship ==
The team has never qualified

Year	Round	Position	GP	W	D	L
(Switzerland) 2008	Did not qualify					
(Switzerland) 2009	Did not qualify					
(Switzerland) 2010	Did not qualify					
(Switzerland) 2011	Did not qualify					
(Switzerland) 2012	Did not qualify					
(Switzerland) 2013	Did not qualify					
(England) 2014	Did not qualify					
(Iceland) 2015	Did not qualify					
(Belarus) 2016	Did not qualify					
(Czech Republic) 2017	Did not qualify					
(Lithuania) 2018	Did not qualify					
(Bulgaria) 2019	Did not qualify					
(Sweden) 2020	Cancelled					
(Faroe Islands) 2021	Cancelled					
(Bosnia and Herzegovina) 2022	Did not qualify					
(Estonia) 2023	Did not qualify					
(Sweden) 2024	Did not qualify					
(Faroe Islands) 2025	Did not qualify					
(Northern Ireland) 2026	Did not qualify					
(Finland) 2027	to be determined					
(Belgium) 2028	to be determined					
(Turkey) 2029	to be determined					
Total	0	0/16 app.	0	0	0	0

=== Previous squads ===
2012 FIFA U-17 Women's World Cup

== Head-to-head record ==
The following table shows Azerbaijan's head-to-head record in the FIFA U-17 Women's World Cup.

Opponent	Pld	W	D	L	GF	GA	GD	Win %
Canada	1	0	0	1	0	1	−1	0.00
Colombia	1	0	0	1	0	4	−4	0.00
Nigeria	1	0	0	1	0	11	−11	0.00
Total	3	0	0	3	0	16	−16	0.00

== See also ==
- Azerbaijan women's national football team
- Azerbaijan women's national under-20 football team
