= Anna Šubrtová =

Czech footballer

Personal information
- Date of birth: 1 November 2002 (age 23)
- Place of birth: Czech Republic
- Positions: Striker; midfielder

Team information
- Current team: Slovan Liberec
- Number: 32

Youth career
- Sadská
- Sparta Prague

Senior career*
Years	Team	Apps	(Gls)
2020–2024	Sparta Prague	57	(21)
2023	→ Slovan Liberec (loan)	9	(4)
2024–	Slovan Liberec	9	(1)

International career^{‡}
2023–	Czech Republic	3	(0)
- * Club domestic league appearances and goals as of 15:03, 27 May 2024 (UTC) ‡ National team caps and goals as of 20:37, 14 March 2026 (UTC)

Anna Šubrtová (born 1 November 2002) is a Czech footballer who plays as a midfielder for Slovan Liberec in the Czech Women's First League.

Šubrtová made her UEFA Women's Champions League debut in a 0–5 loss in a Round 16 match against Paris Saint-Germain.

On 18 January 2023, Šubrtová joined Slovan Liberec on a half-year loan deal. On 16 February 2024, Šubrtová left Sparta Prague and signed a contract with Slovan Liberec.

She is a member of the Czech national team. She made her debut for the national team on 22 September 2023 in a match against Slovenia.

== Personal life ==
She has two brothers and two sisters. Her hobbies include painting, playing the guitar and piano.

Šubrtová works as a school psychologist.
