= Leire Peña =

Spanish footballer (born 2001)

Personal information
- Full name: Leire Peña Ruiz
- Date of birth: 20 June 2001 (age 25)
- Place of birth: Madrid, Spain
- Height: 1.64 m (5 ft 5 in)
- Position: Midfielder

Team information
- Current team: Real Betis
- Number: 6

Senior career*
| Years | Team | Apps | (Gls) |
| 2016–2018 | Madrid CFF B | | |
| 2018–2021 | Atlético Madrid B | 60 | (9) |
| 2021– | Real Betis | 3 | (0) |
- * Club domestic league appearances and goals as of 20:02, 10 December 2021 (UTC)

Leire Peña Ruiz (born 20 June 2001) is a Spanish footballer who plays as a midfielder for Real Betis.

== Club career ==
Peña started her career at Madrid CFF B.
