= Greta Stegemann =

German footballer (born 2001)

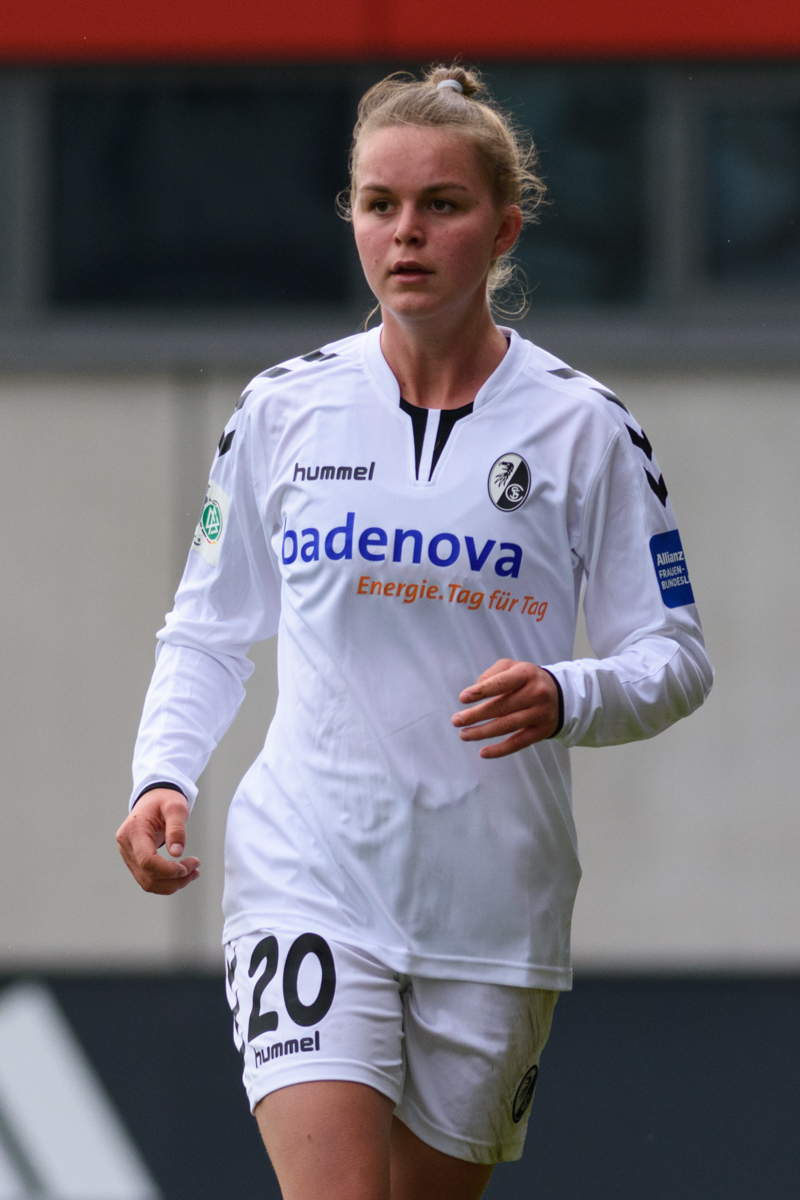

Personal information
- Full name: Greta Elisabeth Stegemann
- Date of birth: 12 February 2001 (age 25)
- Place of birth: Böblingen, Germany
- Height: 1.71 m (5 ft 7 in)
- Position: Defender

Team information
- Current team: VfB Stuttgart
- Number: 5

Youth career
- SC Freiburg

Senior career*
Years	Team	Apps	(Gls)
2017–2024	SC Freiburg II	17	(0)
2017–2026	SC Freiburg	119	(2)
2026–	VfB Stuttgart	10	(0)

International career^{‡}
2017–2018	Germany U17	24	(2)
2019–2021	Germany U19	14	(0)
2019	Germany U20	1	(0)
2025–	Germany U23	2	(0)
- * Club domestic league appearances and goals as of 22 November 2026 ‡ National team caps and goals as of 1 December 2025 (UTC)

Greta Elisabeth Stegemann (born 12 February 2001) is a German professional footballer who plays as a defender for Frauen-Bundesliga club VfB Stuttgart.
