= Finland women's national under-17 football team =

National women's under-17 football team representing Finland

Finland Women's U-17
- Association: Football Association of Finland
- Confederation: UEFA (Europe)
- Head coach: Marko Saloranta
- FIFA code: FIN
First colours	Second colours

First international
- Netherlands 1–2 Finland; 28 April 2012

Biggest win
- Finland 11–0 Georgia; 1 October 2012; Finland 11–0 Faroe Islands; 22 October 2015

Biggest defeat
- Norway 5–1 Finland; 2 October 2013

UEFA Women's Under-17 Championship
- Appearances: 2 (first in 2018)
- Best result: Third place (2018)

FIFA U-17 Women's World Cup
- Appearances: 1 (first in 2018)
- Best result: Group Stage (2018)

Finland women's national under-17 football team is the football team representing Finland in competitions for under-17 year old players and is controlled by the Finnish Football Association. The team qualified for the first time ever at the 2018 FIFA U-17 Women's World Cup in Uruguay.

== Competitive record ==
=== FIFA U-17 Women's World Cup ===
Due to their third place during the 2018 UEFA Women's Under-17 Championship, Finland had also qualified for the 2018 FIFA U-17 Women's World Cup.

Year	Result	Matches	Wins	Draws*	Losses	GF	GA
(New Zealand) 2008	did not qualify						
(Trinidad and Tobago) 2010	did not qualify						
(Azerbaijan) 2012	did not qualify						
(Costa Rica) 2014	did not qualify						
(Jordan) 2016	did not qualify						
(Uruguay) 2018	Group Stage	3	0	1	2	2	5
(India) 2022	did not qualify						
(Dominican Republic) 2024	did not qualify						
(Morocco) 2025	did not qualify						
(Morocco) 2026	To be determined						
(Morocco) 2027	To be determined						
(Morocco) 2028	To be determined						
(Morocco) 2029	To be determined						
Total	1/9	3	0	1	2	2	5

=== UEFA Women's Under-17 Championship ===
The team finished third in the 2018 UEFA Women's Under-17 Championship.

Year	Result	MP	W	D	L	GF	GA
(Switzerland) 2008	did not qualify						
(Switzerland) 2009	did not qualify						
(Switzerland) 2010	did not qualify						
(Switzerland) 2011	did not qualify						
(Switzerland) 2012	did not qualify						
(Switzerland) 2013	did not qualify						
(England) 2014	did not qualify						
(Iceland) 2015	did not qualify						
(Belarus) 2016	did not qualify						
(Czech Republic) 2017	did not qualify						
(Lithuania) 2018	Third place	5	3	0	2	9	5
(Bulgaria) 2019	did not qualify						
(Sweden) ~~2020~~	Cancelled due to the COVID-19 pandemic						
(Faroe Islands) ~~2021~~	Cancelled due to the COVID-19 pandemic						
(Bosnia and Herzegovina) 2022	Group stage	3	1	0	2	2	7
(Estonia) 2023	did not qualify						
(Sweden) 2024	did not qualify						
(Faroe Islands) 2025	did not qualify						
(Northern Ireland) 2026	Group stage	3	0	0	3	1	9
(Finland) 2027	Qualified as Host						
Total:4/18	Third place	11	4	0	7	12	21

== Head-to-head record ==
The following table shows Finland's head-to-head record in the FIFA U-17 Women's World Cup.

Opponent	Pld	W	D	L	GF	GA	GD	Win %
Ghana	1	0	0	1	1	3	−2	0.00
New Zealand	1	0	0	1	0	1	−1	0.00
Uruguay	1	0	1	0	1	1	+0	0.00
Total	3	0	1	2	2	5	−3	0.00

== See also ==
- Finland women's national football team
- Finland women's national under-20 football team
- Women's association football around the world
- Finland men's national football team
