= Maria Dias (footballer) =

Brazilian footballer

Personal information
- Full name: Maria São Pedro Dias de Jesus
- Date of birth: 29 June 1995 (age 31)
- Place of birth: Ipirá, Brazil
- Height: 1.61 m (5 ft 3 in)
- Position: Forward

Team information
- Current team: Real Brasília

Senior career*
Years	Team	Apps	(Gls)
2013–2016	São Francisco	22	(3)
2017–2018	Rio Preto	27	(6)
2019–2021	Santos	33	(3)
2022–	Real Brasília	31	(4)
- * Club domestic league appearances and goals as of 03:09, 23 April 2024 (UTC)

Maria São Pedro Dias de Jesus (born 29 June 1995), known as Maria Dias, is a Brazilian footballer who plays as a forward for Real Brasília.

== Club career ==
=== São Francisco ===
Maria Dias was born in Ipirá, Bahia, and made her senior debut with local side São Francisco in 2013. She made her league debut against Botafogo PB on 2 October 2013. Maria Dias scored her first league goal against América Mineiro on 13 September 2015, scoring in the 2nd minute.

=== Rio Preto ===
In 2017, she joined Rio Preto, and helped the side to win their second consecutive Campeonato Paulista de Futebol Feminino in that year. Maria Dias made her league debut against Ferroviária on 12 March 2017. She scored her first league goals against Ponte Preta on 19 April 2017, scoring in the 42nd and 48th minute.

=== Santos ===
On 18 January 2019, Maria Dias agreed to a contract with Santos. She made her league debut against Corinthians on 21 March 2019. Maria Dias scored her first league goal against EC Vitória on 10 July 2019, scoring in the 90th+3rd minute.

=== Real Brasília ===
Maria Dias made her league debut against Santos on 6 March 2022. She scored her first league goal against Palmeiras on 24 April 2022, scoring in the 21st minute.

== Honours ==
Rio Preto

- Campeonato Paulista de Futebol Feminino: 2017

Santos

- Copa Paulista de Futebol Feminino: 2020
