= 2009 UEFA Women's Under-17 Championship =

Tournament details
- Host country: Switzerland
- Dates: 22–25 June
- Teams: 4

Final positions
- Champions: Germany (2nd title)
- Runners-up: Spain
- Third place: France
- Fourth place: Norway

The 2009 UEFA Women's Under-17 Championship was the second edition of the UEFA Women's Under-17 Championship. Germany won the trophy for the second time in a row.

== Qualification ==
There were two qualifying rounds, and four teams qualified for the final round, played in Switzerland.

=== First qualifying round ===
The ten group winners and best six runners-up advanced to the second qualifying round. The host nations of the ten one-venue mini-tournament groups are indicated in the tables.

==== Group 1 ====
Team	Pld	W	D	L	GF	GA	GD	Pts
Belgium (H)	3	2	1	0	17	2	+15	7
Denmark	3	2	1	0	11	2	+9	7
Kazakhstan	3	1	0	2	3	18	−15	3
Georgia	3	0	0	3	0	9	−9	0

(H) Hosts

14 October 2008
Denmark	3–0	Georgia (awarded)
Belgium	12–0	Kazakhstan
16 October 2008
Kazakhstan	0–6	Denmark
Belgium	3–0	Georgia (awarded)
19 October 2008
Denmark	2–2	Belgium
Georgia	0–3	Kazakhstan (awarded)

==== Group 2 ====
Team	Pld	W	D	L	GF	GA	GD	Pts
France	3	3	0	0	12	0	+12	9
Italy (H)	3	2	0	1	4	6	−2	6
Iceland	3	0	1	2	0	2	−2	1
Azerbaijan	3	0	1	2	1	9	−8	1

(H) Hosts

7 October 2008
France	1–0	Iceland
Italy	3–1	Azerbaijan
9 October 2008
Azerbaijan	0–6	France
Italy	1–0	Iceland
12 October 2008
France	5–0	Italy
Iceland	0–0	Azerbaijan

==== Group 3 ====
Team	Pld	W	D	L	GF	GA	GD	Pts
Ukraine	3	3	0	0	20	1	+19	9
Hungary	3	2	0	1	20	7	+13	6
Lithuania	3	1	0	2	3	10	−7	3
Moldova (H)	3	0	0	3	0	25	−25	0

(H) Hosts

23 October 2008
Hungary	13–0	Moldova
Ukraine	4–0	Lithuania
25 October 2008
Hungary	6–0	Lithuania
Moldova	0–9	Ukraine
28 October 2008
Ukraine	7–1	Hungary
Lithuania	3–0	Moldova

==== Group 4 ====
Team	Pld	W	D	L	GF	GA	GD	Pts
Czech Republic	3	3	0	0	14	2	+12	9
Macedonia (H)	3	2	0	1	7	4	+3	6
Poland	3	1	0	2	7	5	+2	3
Latvia	3	0	0	3	1	18	−17	0

(H) Hosts

13 September 2008
Poland	2–3	Macedonia
Czech Rep.	10–1	Latvia
16 September 2008
Poland	5–0	Latvia
Macedonia	1–2	Czech Republic
18 September 2008
Poland	0–2	Czech Republic
Latvia	0–3	Macedonia

==== Group 5 ====
Team	Pld	W	D	L	GF	GA	GD	Pts
Netherlands	3	3	0	0	14	0	+14	9
Republic of Ireland	3	2	0	1	5	3	+2	6
Turkey (H)	3	1	0	2	5	6	−1	3
Faroe Islands	3	0	0	3	0	15	−15	0

(H) Hosts

18 October 2008
Netherlands	8–0	Faroe Islands
Ireland	2–1	Turkey
20 October 2008
Ireland	3–0	Faroe Islands
Turkey	0–4	Netherlands
23 October 2008
Netherlands	2–0	Ireland
Turkey	4–0	Faroe Islands

==== Group 6 ====
Team	Pld	W	D	L	GF	GA	GD	Pts
Germany	3	3	0	0	30	0	+30	9
Finland	3	1	1	1	8	10	−2	4
Serbia	3	1	1	1	8	13	−5	4
Bulgaria (H)	3	0	0	3	0	23	−23	0

(H) Hosts

16 September 2008
Finland	6–0	Bulgaria
Germany	11–0	Serbia
18 September 2008
Finland	2–2	Serbia
Germany	11–0	Bulgaria
21 September 2008
Germany	8–0	Finland
Serbia	6–0	Bulgaria

==== Group 7 ====
Team	Pld	W	D	L	GF	GA	GD	Pts
Sweden	3	2	1	0	22	1	+21	7
Russia	3	2	1	0	15	1	+14	7
Slovenia (H)	3	1	0	2	6	10	−4	3
Armenia	3	0	0	3	0	31	−31	0

(H) Hosts

15 October 2008
Russia	5–0	Slovenia
Sweden	16–0	Armenia
17 October 2008
Russia	9–0	Armenia
Slovenia	0–5	Sweden
20 October 2008
Sweden	1–1	Russia
Armenia	0–6	Slovenia

==== Group 8 ====
Team	Pld	W	D	L	GF	GA	GD	Pts
Switzerland	3	3	0	0	11	0	+11	9
Scotland	3	2	0	1	6	2	+4	6
Belarus (H)	3	0	1	2	0	7	−7	1
Israel	3	0	1	2	0	8	−8	1

(H) Hosts

18 October 2008
Scotland	5–0	Israel
Switzerland	6–0	Belarus
20 October 2008
Switzerland	3–0	Israel
Belarus	0–1	Scotland
23 October 2008
Scotland	0–2	Switzerland
Israel	0–0	Belarus

==== Group 9 ====
Team	Pld	W	D	L	GF	GA	GD	Pts
Spain	3	3	0	0	12	1	+11	9
Wales	3	2	0	1	9	2	+7	6
Croatia	3	0	1	2	1	5	−4	1
Romania (H)	3	0	1	2	1	15	−14	1

(H) Hosts

21 October 2008
Wales	7–0	Romania
Spain	3–0	Croatia
23 October 2008
Romania	0–7	Spain
Wales	1–0	Croatia
26 October 2008
Spain	2–1	Wales
Croatia	1–1	Romania

==== Group 10 ====
Team	Pld	W	D	L	GF	GA	GD	Pts
Norway	3	3	0	0	13	1	+12	9
England	3	2	0	1	8	2	+6	6
Greece	3	0	1	2	1	9	−8	1
Estonia (H)	3	0	1	2	1	11	−10	1

(H) Hosts

19 September 2008
England	4–0	Greece
Norway	7–0	Estonia
21 September 2008
Norway	4–0	Greece
Estonia	0–3	England
24 September 2008
England	1–2	Norway
Greece	1–1	Estonia

==== Ranking of second-placed teams ====
To determine the best six runner-up teams from the first qualifying round, only the results against the first and the third teams in each group were taken into account.

Grp	Team	Pld	W	D	L	GF	GA	GD	Pts
1	Denmark	2	1	1	0	8	2	+6	4
7	Russia	2	1	1	0	6	1	+5	4
10	England	2	1	0	1	5	2	+3	3
3	Hungary	2	1	0	1	7	7	0	3
4	Macedonia	2	1	0	1	4	4	0	3
9	Wales	2	1	0	1	2	2	0	3
5	Republic of Ireland	2	1	0	1	2	3	−1	3
8	Scotland	2	1	0	1	1	2	−1	3
2	Italy	2	1	0	1	1	5	−4	3
6	Finland	2	0	1	1	2	10	−8	1

=== Second qualifying round ===
The sixteen qualified teams from the first qualifying round were allocated in four groups of four teams each. The group winners advanced to the final tournament. The host nations of the four one-venue mini-tournament groups are indicated in italics.

==== Group 1 ====
Team	Pld	W	D	L	GF	GA	GD	Pts
Norway	3	2	1	0	12	3	+9	7
Sweden	3	2	1	0	6	0	+6	7
Ukraine	3	1	0	2	6	10	−4	3
Macedonia (H)	3	0	0	3	4	15	−11	0

(H) Hosts

8 April 2009
Ukraine	0–5	Sweden
Norway	9–2	Macedonia
10 April 2009
Ukraine	5–2	Macedonia
Sweden	0–0	Norway
13 April 2009
Norway	3–1	Ukraine
Macedonia	0–1	Sweden

==== Group 2 ====
Team	Pld	W	D	L	GF	GA	GD	Pts
Spain	3	3	0	0	10	1	+9	9
Czech Republic	3	2	0	1	3	3	0	6
England	3	0	1	2	1	4	−3	1
Belgium (H)	3	0	1	2	1	7	−6	1

(H) Hosts

5 April 2009
Belgium	0–1	Czech Republic
Spain	2–0	England
7 April 2009
Belgium	0–5	Spain
England	0–1	Czech Republic
10 April 2009
Spain	3–1	Czech Republic
England	1–1	Belgium

==== Group 3 ====
Team	Pld	W	D	L	GF	GA	GD	Pts
Germany	3	3	0	0	16	0	+16	9
Switzerland	3	2	0	1	3	7	−4	6
Russia	3	1	0	2	4	8	−4	3
Hungary (H)	3	0	0	3	2	10	−8	0

(H) Hosts

9 April 2009
Switzerland	1–0	Hungary
Germany	4–0	Russia
11 April 2009
Russia	1–2	Switzerland
Germany	6–0	Hungary
14 April 2009
Switzerland	0–6	Germany
Hungary	2–3	Russia

==== Group 4 ====
Team	Pld	W	D	L	GF	GA	GD	Pts
France	3	2	1	0	7	0	+7	7
Netherlands (H)	3	2	1	0	7	1	+6	7
Denmark	3	0	1	2	1	4	−3	1
Wales	3	0	1	2	2	12	−10	1

(H) Hosts

25 March 2009
France	5–0	Wales
Netherlands	1–0	Denmark
27 March 2009
Denmark	0–2	France
Netherlands	6–1	Wales
30 March 2009
France	0–0	Netherlands
Wales	1–1	Denmark

== Final tournament ==
2009 UEFA Women's Under-17 Championship teams and final tournament performance

The knockout stage was played in Switzerland.

Semi-finals
22 June 2009
Germany	4
France	1
22 June 2009
Norway	0
Spain	2

Final
25 June 2009
Germany	7
Spain	0
Third place
25 June 2009
Norway	1
France	3

Final

25 June 2009

Spain	0–7	Germany
	Report	Rolser 4'; Malinowski 17', 42', 45', 56', 80'; Elsig 67' (pen.)

Colovray Sports Centre, Nyon

2009 UEFA Women's Under-17 European champions

Germany
Second title
