= Dženita Ramčilović =

Montenegrin footballer

Personal information
- Date of birth: 27 March 2001 (age 25)
- Position: Forward

International career^{‡}
Years	Team	Apps	(Gls)
- Montenegro
- ‡ National team caps and goals as of 23:49, 31 August 2019 (UTC)

Dženita Ramčilović (born 27 March 2001) is a Montenegrin footballer who plays as a forward and has appeared for the Montenegro women's national team.

== Career ==
Ramčilović has been capped for the Montenegro national team, appearing for the team during the UEFA Women's Euro 2021 qualifying cycle.
