= Sara Velkova =

Macedonian footballer

Personal information
- Date of birth: 9 February 2002 (age 24)
- Position: Defender

International career^{‡}
Years	Team	Apps	(Gls)
2017–2018	North Macedonia U-17	6	(2)
2019	North Macedonia U-19	3	(0)
2020–	North Macedonia	1	(0)
- ‡ National team caps and goals as of 09:45, 19 September 2021 (UTC)

Sara Velkova (born 9 February 2002) is a Macedonian footballer who plays as a defender for the North Macedonia national team.

== International career ==
Velkova made her debut for the North Macedonia national team on 27 November 2020, coming on as a substitute for Afrodita Salihi against Kazakhstan.
