= Serbia women's national under-17 football team =

National association football team

Serbia Women's U-17
- Association: Football Association of Serbia
- Head coach: (Serbia) Suzana Stanojević
- FIFA code: SRB
First colours	Second colours

The Serbia women's national under-17 football team (Serbian Latin: Kadetska ženska reprezentacija Srbije) is the national under-17 football team of Serbia and is controlled by the Football Association of Serbia.

== Current squad ==
The following players were named in the squad for the 2016 UEFA Women's U-17 Championship in May 2016.

No.	Pos.	Player	Date of birth (age)	Caps	Goals	Club
1	GK	Tanja Đapić	4 July 1999 (age 27)	7	0	(Football Association of Serbia) Vojvodina
12	GK	Sara Cetinja	16 April 2000 (age 26)	4	0	(Football Association of Serbia) Spartak
3	DF	Isidora Vučković	9 May 1999 (age 27)	0	0	(Football Association of Serbia) Mašinac
5	DF	Dunja Mostarac	15 February 2000 (age 26)	4	0	(Football Association of Serbia) Spartak
6	DF	Jovana Miladinović	16 April 2000 (age 26)	8	0	(Football Association of Serbia) Crvena Zvezda
14	DF	Jelena Spasojević	19 March 2000 (age 26)	1	0	(Football Association of Serbia) Vojvodina
15	DF	Anastasija Nikolić	18 April 2000 (age 26)	3	0	(Football Association of Serbia) Vojvodina
17	DF	Milana Knežević	5 May 1999 (age 27)	13	1	(Football Association of Serbia) Metalmanija
4	MF	Aida Kardović	22 January 2000 (age 26)	3	1	(German Football Association) 1. FFC Turbine Potsdam
8	MF	Ivana Trbojević	26 July 2000 (age 26)	5	0	(Football Association of Serbia) Vojvodina
10	MF	Tijana Filipović	25 May 1999 (age 27)	2	0	(Football Association of Serbia) Spartak
13	MF	Anđela Kričak	13 February 1999 (age 27)	4	0	(Football Association of Serbia) Napredak
16	MF	Sara Savanović	12 August 2000 (age 26)	8	2	(Football Association of Serbia) Vojvodina
18	MF	Anđela Frajtović	8 June 1999 (age 27)	8	1	(Football Association of Serbia) Spartak
2	FW	Teodora Burkert	11 December 1999 (age 26)	5	0	(Football Association of Serbia) Spartak
7	FW	Allegra Poljak	15 February 1999 (age 27)	2	1	(Football Association of Serbia) Spartak
9	FW	Miljana Ivanović	17 May 2000 (age 26)	5	2	(Football Association of Serbia) Mašinac
11	FW	Jovana Agbaba	11 March 2000 (age 26)	6	0	(Football Association of Serbia) Crvena zvezda

== Competitive Record ==
=== FIFA World Youth Championship Record ===
Year	Result	GP	W	D*	L	GS	GA
(New Zealand) 2008	did not qualify						
(Trinidad and Tobago) 2010	did not qualify						
(Azerbaijan) 2012	did not qualify						
(Costa Rica) 2014	did not qualify						
(Jordan) 2016	did not qualify						
(Uruguay) 2018	did not qualify						
(India) 2022	did not qualify						
(Dominican Republic) 2024	did not qualify						
(Morocco) 2025	did not qualify						
(Morocco) 2026	did not qualify						
(Morocco) 2027	To be determined						
(Morocco) 2028	To be determined						
(Morocco) 2029	To be determined						
Total	0/9	0	0	0	0	0	0

=== UEFA European U-17 Championship Record ===
Year	Result	GP	W	D*	L	GS	GA
2008 to 2015	did not qualify						
(Belarus) 2016	Group stage	3	1	0	2	6	6
(Czech Republic) 2017	did not qualify						
(Lithuania) 2018	did not qualify						
(Bulgaria) 2019	did not qualify						
~~2020~~ to ~~2021~~	Cancelled						
(Bosnia and Herzegovina) 2022	did not qualify						
(Estonia) 2023	did not qualify						
(Sweden) 2024	did not qualify						
(Faroe Islands) 2025	did not qualify						
(Northern Ireland) 2026	did not qualify						
(Finland) 2027	TBD						
(Belgium) 2028	TBD						
(Turkey) 2029	TBD						
Total	1/13	3	1	0	2	6	6

*Draws include knockout matches decided by penalty shootout.

== See also ==
- Serbia women's national football team
- UEFA Women's U-17 Championship
