= 2008 UEFA Women's Under-17 Championship =

Tournament details
- Host country: Switzerland
- Dates: 20–23 May
- Teams: 4

Final positions
- Champions: Germany (1st title)
- Runners-up: France
- Third place: Denmark
- Fourth place: England

Tournament statistics
- Matches played: 88
- Goals scored: 424 (4.82 per match)

The 2008 UEFA Women's Under-17 Championship was the first edition of the UEFA Women's Under-17 Championship. Germany won the trophy for the first time ever.

== Qualification ==
There were two qualifying rounds, and four teams qualified for the final round, played in Switzerland.

=== First qualifying round ===
There were ten groups of four teams each. The ten group winners and best six runners-up advanced to the second qualifying round.

Teams in italics hosted the mini-tournament.

Key to colours in group tables
Team advances to the second qualifying round
Team eliminated in this round

==== Group 1 ====
Team	Pld	W	D	L	GF	GA	GD	Pts
Switzerland	3	2	1	0	11	2	+9	7
Wales	3	1	2	0	14	4	+10	5
Lithuania	3	1	1	1	4	7	−3	4
Cyprus	3	0	0	3	0	16	−16	0

11 October 2007

Wales	10 – 0	Cyprus

11 October 2007

Switzerland	5 – 0	Lithuania

13 October 2007

Switzerland	4 – 0	Cyprus

13 October 2007

Lithuania	2 – 2	Wales

16 October 2007

Wales	2 – 2	Switzerland

16 October 2007

Cyprus	0 – 2	Lithuania

==== Group 2 ====
Team	Pld	W	D	L	GF	GA	GD	Pts
Netherlands	3	3	0	0	7	0	+7	9
Poland	3	2	0	1	8	2	+6	6
Azerbaijan	3	1	0	2	2	7	−5	3
Greece	3	0	0	3	1	9	−8	0

8 October 2007

Netherlands	2 – 0	Azerbaijan

8 October 2007

Poland	4 – 0	Greece

10 October 2007

Poland	4 – 0	Azerbaijan

10 October 2007

Greece	0 – 3	Netherlands

13 October 2007

Netherlands	2 – 0	Poland

13 October 2007

Azerbaijan	2 – 1	Greece

==== Group 3 ====
Team	Pld	W	D	L	GF	GA	GD	Pts
Finland	3	3	0	0	24	2	+22	9
Belgium	3	2	0	1	10	4	+6	6
Faroe Islands	3	1	0	2	2	14	−12	3
Estonia	3	0	0	3	1	17	−16	0

11 September 2007

Belgium	5 – 1	Faroe Islands

11 September 2007

Finland	12 – 1	Estonia

13 September 2007

Finland	9 – 0	Faroe Islands

13 September 2007

Estonia	0 – 4	Belgium

16 September 2007

Belgium	1 – 3	Finland

16 September 2007

Estonia	0 – 1	Faroe Islands

==== Group 4 ====
Team	Pld	W	D	L	GF	GA	GD	Pts
Iceland	3	3	0	0	15	1	+14	9
Slovenia	3	1	1	1	5	7	−2	4
Ukraine	3	1	1	1	4	6	−2	4
Latvia	3	0	0	3	2	12	−10	0

17 September 2007

Ukraine	2 – 2	Slovenia

17 September 2007

Iceland	7 – 1	Latvia

19 September 2007

Ukraine	2 – 1	Latvia

19 September 2007

Slovenia	0 – 5	Iceland

22 September 2007

Iceland	3 – 0	Ukraine

22 September 2007

Latvia	0 – 3	Slovenia

==== Group 5 ====
Team	Pld	W	D	L	GF	GA	GD	Pts
France	3	3	0	0	31	0	+31	9
Denmark	3	2	0	1	30	4	+26	6
Macedonia	3	1	0	2	3	18	−15	3
Armenia	3	0	0	3	1	43	−42	0

16 October 2007

France	11 – 0	Macedonia

16 October 2007

Denmark	24 – 0	Armenia

18 October 2007

France	16 – 0	Armenia

18 October 2007

Macedonia	0 – 6	Denmark

21 October 2007

Denmark	0 – 4	France

21 October 2007

Armenia	1 – 3	Macedonia

==== Group 6 ====
Team	Pld	W	D	L	GF	GA	GD	Pts
Sweden	3	3	0	0	17	2	+15	9
Republic of Ireland	3	2	0	1	11	2	+9	6
Turkey	3	1	0	2	8	8	0	3
Moldova	3	0	0	3	0	24	−24	0

19 October 2007

Sweden	12 – 0	Moldova

19 October 2007

Republic of Ireland	5 – 0	Turkey

21 October 2007

Republic of Ireland	5 – 0	Moldova

21 October 2007

Turkey	1 – 3	Sweden
Elgalp 75'

24 October 2007

Sweden	2 – 1	Republic of Ireland

24 October 2007

Moldova	0 – 7	Turkey
		4', 20', 26' Elgalp; 14' Sabırlı; 38' Aydın; 40' Özkan; 46' Demiryol

==== Group 7 ====
Team	Pld	W	D	L	GF	GA	GD	Pts
Czech Republic	3	2	1	0	12	3	+9	7
Spain	3	1	2	0	14	2	+12	5
Italy	3	1	1	1	9	6	+3	4
Belarus	3	0	0	3	2	26	−24	0

5 November 2007

Italy	6 – 2	Belarus

5 November 2007

Czech Republic	1 – 1	Spain

7 November 2007

Italy	2 – 3	Czech Republic

7 November 2007

Spain	12 – 0	Belarus

10 November 2007

Spain	1 – 1	Italy

10 November 2007

Belarus	0 – 8	Czech Republic

==== Group 8 ====
Team	Pld	W	D	L	GF	GA	GD	Pts
Scotland	3	3	0	0	13	1	+12	9
Hungary	3	2	0	1	9	3	+6	6
Northern Ireland	3	0	1	2	0	8	−8	1
Croatia	3	0	1	2	0	10	−10	1

20 October 2007

Scotland	6 – 0	Northern Ireland

20 October 2007

Hungary	6 – 0	Croatia

22 October 2007

Scotland	4 – 0	Croatia

22 October 2007

Hungary	2 – 0	Northern Ireland

25 October 2007

Hungary	1 – 3	Scotland

25 October 2007

Croatia	0 – 0	Northern Ireland

==== Group 9 ====
Team	Pld	W	D	L	GF	GA	GD	Pts
Germany	3	3	0	0	24	1	+23	9
Norway	3	2	0	1	22	6	+16	6
Israel	3	1	0	2	1	18	−17	3
Bulgaria	3	0	0	3	0	22	−22	0

5 September 2007

Norway	11 – 0	Bulgaria

5 September 2007

Germany	8 – 0	Israel

9 September 2007

Germany	10 – 0	Bulgaria

9 September 2007

Norway	10 – 0	Israel

10 September 2007

Norway	1 – 6	Germany

10 September 2007

Bulgaria	0 – 1	Israel

==== Group 10 ====
Team	Pld	W	D	L	GF	GA	GD	Pts
England	3	3	0	0	17	1	+16	9
Russia	3	2	0	1	6	2	+4	6
Slovakia	3	1	0	2	8	6	+2	3
Georgia	3	0	0	3	0	22	−22	0

27 October 2007

Russia	3 – 1	Slovakia
24' Makarowa; 53', 73' Aborovichute		39' Mashlyaewa

27 October 2007

England	13 – 0	Georgia

29 October 2007

Georgia	0 – 3	Russia
		4', 50' Koltakova; 80' Ananiewa

29 October 2007

England	3 – 1	Slovakia

1 November 2007

Russia	0 – 1	England

1 November 2007

Slovakia	6 – 0	Georgia

==== Ranking of group runners-up ====
Only matches against 1st and 3rd placed teams were used in the ranking.

Grp		Pld	W	D	L	GF	GA	GD	Pts
9	Norway	2	1	0	1	11	6	+5	3
6	Republic of Ireland	2	1	0	1	6	2	+4	3
5	Denmark	2	1	0	1	6	4	+2	3
3	Belgium	2	1	0	1	6	4	+2	3
2	Poland	2	1	0	1	4	2	+2	3
10	Russia	2	1	0	1	3	2	+1	3
8	Hungary	2	1	0	1	3	3	0	3
1	Wales	2	0	2	0	4	4	0	2
7	Spain	2	0	2	0	2	2	0	2
4	Slovenia	2	0	1	1	2	7	–5	1

=== Second qualifying round ===
The sixteen qualified teams from the first qualifying round were allocated in four groups of four teams each. The group winners advanced to the final round.

Teams in italics hosted the mini-tournament.

Key to colours in group tables
Team advances to the final tournament
Team eliminated in this round

==== Group 1 ====
Team	Pld	W	D	L	GF	GA	GD	Pts
England	3	2	1	0	7	1	+6	7
Netherlands	3	1	2	0	3	1	+2	5
Czech Republic	3	1	0	2	3	7	−4	3
Belgium	3	0	1	2	3	7	−4	1

25 March 2008

England	4 – 0	Czech Republic

25 March 2008

Netherlands	1 – 1	Belgium

27 March 2008

England	3 – 1	Belgium

27 March 2008

Netherlands	2 – 0	Czech Republic

29 March 2008

Netherlands	0 – 0	England

29 March 2008

Belgium	1 – 3	Czech Republic

==== Group 2 ====
Team	Pld	W	D	L	GF	GA	GD	Pts
France	3	3	0	0	5	0	+5	9
Scotland	3	2	0	1	2	1	+1	6
Republic of Ireland	3	1	0	2	1	3	−2	3
Norway	3	0	0	3	0	4	−4	0

18 March 2008

Scotland	1 – 0	Republic of Ireland

18 March 2008

France	2 – 0	Norway

20 March 2008

France	2 – 0	Republic of Ireland

20 March 2008

Norway	0 – 1	Scotland

23 March 2008

Scotland	0 – 1	France

23 March 2008

Republic of Ireland	1 – 0	Norway

==== Group 3 ====
Team	Pld	W	D	L	GF	GA	GD	Pts
Germany	3	3	0	0	11	1	+10	9
Poland	3	1	1	1	3	4	−1	4
Sweden	3	0	2	1	3	6	−6	2
Switzerland	3	0	1	2	1	7	−6	1

10 April 2008

Sweden	1 – 1	Poland

10 April 2008

Germany	4 – 0	Switzerland

12 April 2008

Switzerland	1 – 1	Sweden

12 April 2008

Germany	3 – 0	Poland

15 April 2008

Sweden	1 – 4	Germany

15 April 2008

Poland	2 – 0	Switzerland

==== Group 4 ====
Team	Pld	W	D	L	GF	GA	GD	Pts
Denmark	3	2	1	0	6	2	+4	7
Finland	3	2	1	0	5	2	+3	7
Russia	3	1	0	2	4	6	−2	3
Iceland	3	0	0	3	7	12	−5	0

24 March 2008

Iceland	3 – 4	Russia

24 March 2008

Finland	0 – 0	Denmark

27 March 2008

Finland	1 – 0	Russia

27 March 2008

Denmark	4 – 2	Iceland

29 March 2008

Iceland	2 – 4	Finland

29 March 2008

Russia	0 – 2	Denmark

== Final tournament ==
2008 UEFA Women's Under-17 Championship teams and final tournament performance

The knockout stage was played in Switzerland. The four teams qualified to the 2008 FIFA U-17 Women's World Cup held in New Zealand.

Semi-finals
20 May 2008
Germany	1
Denmark	0
20 May 2008
England	1
France (a.e.t.)	3

Final
23 May 2008
Germany	3
France	0
Third place
23 May 2008
England	1
Denmark	4

2008 UEFA Women's Under-17 European champions

Germany
First title
