= 2027 UEFA Women's Under-17 Championship =

Jalkapallon alle 17-vuotiaiden naisten Euroopan-mestaruuskilpailut 2027 U17-Europamästerskapet i fotboll för damer 2027

Tournament details
- Host country: Finland
- Dates: 9–22 May
- Teams: 8 (from 1 confederation)

Tournament statistics
- Attendance: 0

The 2027 UEFA Women's Under-17 Championship will be the 18th edition of the UEFA Women's Under-17 Championship, the annual international youth football championship organised by UEFA for the women's under-17 national teams of Europe. Finland will be hosting the tournament. A total of eight teams will be playing in the tournament, with players born on or after 1 January 2010 eligible to participate.

This tournament will also act as UEFA's qualifier for the 2027 FIFA U-17 Women's World Cup in Morocco, with top five teams qualifying as the UEFA representatives.

== Qualification ==
50 (out of 55) UEFA nations entered the qualifying competition, with the hosts Finland also competing despite already qualifying automatically, and seven teams qualified for the final tournament at the end of round 2 to join the hosts.

Team	Method of qualification	Appearance	Last appearance	Previous best performance
Finland	Hosts	3rd	2022	Third place (2018)

== Qualified teams for FIFA U-17 Women's World Cup ==
The following three teams from UEFA qualified for the 2027 FIFA U-17 Women's World Cup in Morocco.

Team	Qualified on	Previous appearances in FIFA U-17 Women's World Cup^{1}

^{1} Bold indicates champions for that year. Italic indicates hosts for that year.
