= 2024 UEFA Women's Under-17 Championship qualification =

Tournament details
- Dates: Round 1: 2 October – 3 December 2023; Round 2: 17 February – 24 March 2024
- Teams: 50 (from 1 confederation)

Tournament statistics
- Matches played: 126
- Goals scored: 500 (3.97 per match)
- Top scorer(s): (England) Denny Draper (Spain) Alba Cerrato (10 goals each)
- All statistics correct as of 18 March 2024.

The 2024 UEFA Women's Under-17 Championship qualifying competition was a women's under-17 football competition that determined the seven teams joining the automatically qualified hosts Sweden in the final tournament.

50 teams, including hosts Sweden, entered the qualifying competition. Players born on or after 1 January 2007 are eligible to participate.

== Format ==
In the 2022 season, UEFA implemented a new format for the women's U17 and U19 Euros, based on a league-style qualifying format.

The teams were divided in two leagues: League A (28 teams) and League B (22 teams).

Each league played two rounds:

- Round 1: In each league, groups of 4 teams played mini-tournaments. The winners of each mini-tournament in league B and the best runner-up were promoted and the last-placed teams in league A mini-tournaments were relegated.
- Round 2: The seven winners of League A qualified for the final tournament. The six winners of mini-tournaments in league B and the best runner-up were promoted and the last-placed teams in league A were relegated for Round 1 of the next edition of the tournament.

=== Tiebreakers ===
In Round 1 and Round 2, teams are ranked according to points (3 points for a win, 1 point for a draw, 0 points for a loss), and if tied on points, the following tiebreaking criteria are applied, in the order given, to determine the rankings (Regulations Articles 17.01 and 17.02):

1. Points in head-to-head matches among tied teams;
2. Goal difference in head-to-head matches among tied teams;
3. Goals scored in head-to-head matches among tied teams;
4. If more than two teams are tied, and after applying all head-to-head criteria above, a subset of teams are still tied, all head-to-head criteria above are reapplied exclusively to this subset of teams;
5. Goal difference in all group matches;
6. Goals scored in all group matches;
7. Penalty shoot-out if only two teams have the same number of points, and they met in the last round of the group and are tied after applying all criteria above (not used if more than two teams have the same number of points, or if their rankings are not relevant for qualification for the next stage);
8. Disciplinary points (red card = 3 points, yellow card = 1 point, expulsion for two yellow cards in one match = 3 points);
9. Position in the applicable ranking:
  1. for teams in Round 1, position in 2021–22 Round 2 league rankings;
  2. for teams in Round 2, position in the Round 1 league ranking.

To determine the five best third-placed teams from the qualifying round, the results against the teams in fourth place are discarded. The following criteria are applied (Regulations Article 15.01):

1. Points;
2. Goal difference;
3. Goals scored;
4. Disciplinary points;
5. Position in the applicable ranking:
  1. for teams in Round 1, position in the coefficient rankings;
  2. for teams in Round 2, position in the Round 1 league ranking.

== Round 1 ==
=== Draw ===
The draw for the qualifying round was held on 16 June 2023, at the UEFA headquarters in Nyon, Switzerland.

The teams were seeded according to their final group standings of the 2022–23 competition (Regulations Article 13.01).

Each group contained one team from Pot A, one team from Pot B, one team from Pot C, and one team from Pot D. For political reasons, Belarus and Ukraine could not be drawn in the same group in League A as well as Armenia and Azerbaijan in League B.

To determine the 2022–23 Round 2 league rankings, the following criteria was followed:

1. higher position in the following classification:
  1. League A Round 2 group winners
  2. League A Round 2 group runners-up
  3. League A Round 2 third-placed teams
  4. Teams promoted from League B
  5. Teams relegated from League A
  6. League B Round 2 runners-up
  7. League B Round 2 third-placed teams
  8. League B Round 2 fourth-placed teams
2. higher number of points in all mini-tournament matches;
3. superior goal difference in all mini-tournament matches;
4. higher number of goals scored in all mini-tournament matches;
5. lower disciplinary points (red card = 3 points, yellow card = 1 point, expulsion for two yellow cards in one match = 3 points);
6. higher position in the 2022–23 Round 1 league rankings.

Teams entering League A

Pot 1
Team	Pos.	Pts.	GD	GS
Poland	1 (A)			
England	1 (A)			
Germany	1 (A)			
Switzerland	1 (A)			
France TH	1 (A)			
Spain	1 (A)			
Sweden	1 (A)			

Pot 2
Team	Pos.	Pts.	GD	GS
Romania	2 (A)			
Belgium	2 (A)			
Portugal	2 (A)			
Slovenia	2 (A)			
Republic of Ireland	2 (A)			
Denmark	2 (A)			
Netherlands	2 (A)			

Pot 3
Team	Pos.	Pts.	GD	GS
Czech Republic	3 (A)			
Norway	3 (A)			
Hungary	3 (A)			
Austria	3 (A)			
Italy	3 (A)			
Belarus	3 (A)			
Finland	3 (A)			

Pot 4
Team	Pos.	Pts.	GD	GS
Greece	1 (B)			
Bosnia and Herzegovina	1 (B)			
Scotland	1 (B)			
Iceland	1 (B)			
Northern Ireland	1 (B)			
Ukraine	1 (B)			
Bulgaria	2 (B)			

Teams entering League B

Pot 1
Team	Pos.	Pts.	GD	GS
Estonia	4 (A)			
Croatia	4 (A)			
Slovakia	4 (A)			
Kosovo	4 (A)			
Serbia	4 (A)			
Wales	4 (A)			

Pot 2
Team	Pos.	Pts.	GD	GS
North Macedonia	4 (A)			
Faroe Islands	2 (B)			
Montenegro	2 (B)			
Israel	2 (B)			
Luxembourg	2 (B)			
Turkey	2 (B)			

Pot 3
Team	Pos.	Pts.	GD	GS
Latvia	3 (B)			
Lithuania	3 (B)			
Azerbaijan	3 (B)			
Georgia	3 (B)			
Albania	3 (B)			
Armenia	3 (B)			
Moldova	4 (B)			
Kazakhstan	4 (B)			
Andorra	Didn't participate in the previous edition			
Malta	Didn't participate in the previous edition			

=== League A ===
Hosts were appointed for each mini-tournament. All the matches were played between 2 October and 3 December 2023.

==== Group A1 ====
Pos	Team	Pld	W	D	L	GF	GA	GD	Pts	Promotion
1	Spain	3	3	0	0	16	2	+14	9	Transfer to Round 2 (League A)
2	Portugal (H)	3	2	0	1	4	4	0	6	Transfer to Round 2 (League A)
3	Czech Republic	3	1	0	2	2	5	−3	3	Transfer to Round 2 (League A)
4	Bosnia and Herzegovina (R)	3	0	0	3	1	12	−11	0	Relegated to Round 2 (League B)

Source: UEFA
Rules for classification: Qualification tiebreakers
(H) Hosts; (R) Relegated
25 October 2023
16:00

Spain	8–1	Bosnia and Herzegovina
Segura 3', 47'; Gómez 12'; Comendador 14'; Torres 23'; Cerrato 75', 78', 82'	Report	Mirković 52'

Estádio João Soares Vieira, Braga
Attendance: 42
Referee: Louise Thompson (Northern Ireland)
25 October 2023
19:00

Czech Republic	0–1	Portugal
	Report	Valente 90'

Estádio Municipal de Fafe, Fafe
Attendance: 49
Referee: Nanna Løf Andersen (Denmark)

28 October 2023
16:00

Spain	4–1	Czech Republic
Gómez 24', 55', 68'; Cerrato 90+5'	Report	Kroupová 85' (pen.)

Estádio João Soares Vieira, Braga
Attendance: 68
Referee: Caroline Lanssens (Belgium)
28 October 2023
19:00

Portugal	3–0	Bosnia and Herzegovina
Melo 53'; Silva 64'; Vincente 70'	Report

Estádio Municipal de Fafe, Fafe
Attendance: 71
Referee: Nanna Løf Andersen (Denmark)

31 October 2023
12:00

Portugal	0–4	Spain
	Report	Segura 22'; Ortega 31' (pen.); Comendador 36'; Moreno 70'

Pista de Atletismo Gémeos Castro, Guimaraes
Attendance: 162
Referee: Caroline Lanssens (Belgium)
31 October 2023
12:00

Bosnia and Herzegovina	0–1	Czech Republic
	Report	Vojtěchová 39'

Estádio João Soares Vieira, Braga
Attendance: 15
Referee: Louise Thompson (Northern Ireland)

==== Group A2 ====
Pos	Team	Pld	W	D	L	GF	GA	GD	Pts	Promotion
1	Poland (H)	3	3	0	0	13	1	+12	9	Transfer to Round 2 (League A)
2	Norway	3	2	0	1	4	4	0	6	Transfer to Round 2 (League A)
3	Iceland	3	1	0	2	4	8	−4	3	Transfer to Round 2 (League A)
4	Republic of Ireland (R)	3	0	0	3	2	10	−8	0	Relegated to Round 2 (League B)

Source: UEFA
Rules for classification: Qualification tiebreakers
(H) Hosts; (R) Relegated
12 October 2023
12:00

Poland	4–0	Iceland
Witek 3'; Zwiazek 8'; Araśniewicz 39'; Einarsdóttir 50' (o.g.)	Report

GIEKSA Arena, Bełchatów
Attendance: 700
Referee: Rita Vehapi (Kosovo)
12 October 2023
15:00

Norway	1–0	Republic of Ireland
Lium 90+5'	Report

Concordia Piotrków Trybunalski, Piotrków Trybunalski
Attendance: 327
Referee: Teresa Oliveira (Portugal)

15 October 2023
12:00

Poland	3–0	Norway
Araśniewicz 1'; Zielińska 45'; Flis 83'	Report

GIEKSA Arena, Bełchatów
Attendance: 421
Referee: Anastasia Mylopoulou (Greece)
15 October 2023
15:00

Republic of Ireland	1–3	Iceland
Sena 27'	Report	R. Jónsdóttir 65'; H. Jónsdóttir 78'; Pálmadóttir 90+5'

Concordia Piotrków Trybunalski, Piotrków Trybunalski
Attendance: 572
Referee: Teresa Oliveira (Portugal)

18 October 2023
12:00

Republic of Ireland	1–6	Poland
Devereux 2'	Report	Ostrowska 12', 90+5'; Skrzypczyk 16'; Witek 31' (pen.); Zwiazek 55'; Lapinska 78'

Concordia Piotrków Trybunalski, Piotrków Trybunalski
Attendance: 1,283
Referee: Anastasia Mylopoulou (Greece)
18 October 2023
12:00

Iceland	1–3	Norway
Sagen 6' (o.g.)	Report	Cotrau 2'; Kerim-Lindland 17'; Ulstein 30'

GIEKSA Arena, Bełchatów
Attendance: 112
Referee: Rita Vehapi (Kosovo)

==== Group A3 ====
Pos	Team	Pld	W	D	L	GF	GA	GD	Pts	Promotion
1	France	3	3	0	0	15	3	+12	9	Transfer to Round 2 (League A)
2	Italy (H)	3	1	1	1	9	6	+3	4	Transfer to Round 2 (League A)
3	Scotland	3	1	1	1	5	6	−1	4	Transfer to Round 2 (League A)
4	Slovenia (R)	3	0	0	3	1	15	−14	0	Relegated to Round 2 (League B)

Source: UEFA
Rules for classification: Qualification tiebreakers
(H) Hosts; (R) Relegated
9 October 2023
11:00

France	3–0	Scotland
Graziani 28'; Rouquet 33'; Bacoul-Juillard 83'	Report

Real Cosenza, Cosenza
Attendance: 190
Referee: Marisca Overtoom (Netherlands)
9 October 2023
16:00

Italy	4–0	Slovenia
Ferraresi 6' (pen.), 57' (pen.); Ventriglia 48', 72'	Report

Stadium San Vito, Cosenza
Attendance: 257
Referee: Miriama Bočková (Slovakia)

12 October 2023
11:00

Slovenia	1–3	Scotland
Osolnik 43'	Report	Gray 13'; Martin 54', 65'

Real Cosenza, Cosenza
Attendance: 198
Referee: Miriama Bočková (Slovakia)
12 October 2023
17:00

France	4–3	Italy
Ouazar 23'; Tene 43', 45+5'; Graziani 86'	Report	Galli 17'; Romanelli 30'; Ferraresi 66' (pen.)

Stadium San Vito, Cosenza
Attendance: 868
Referee: Ioanna Allayiotou (Cyprus)

15 October 2023
11:00

Slovenia	0–8	France
	Report	Rafalski 38'; Abdourahim 53', 77', 83'; Sylejmani 69'; Ouazar 75'; Gay 90+1', 90+3'

Real Cosenza, Cosenza
Attendance: 20
Referee: Ioanna Allayiotou (Cyprus)
15 October 2023
11:00

Scotland	2–2	Italy
Berry 53'; Martin 59'	Report	Ventriglia 5'; Ferraresi 88' (pen.)

Stadium San Vito, Cosenza
Attendance: 683
Referee: Marisca Overtoom (Netherlands)

==== Group A4 ====
Pos	Team	Pld	W	D	L	GF	GA	GD	Pts	Promotion
1	Austria	3	3	0	0	13	1	+12	9	Transfer to Round 2 (League A)
2	Germany (H)	3	2	0	1	12	4	+8	6	Transfer to Round 2 (League A)
3	Ukraine	3	0	1	2	1	7	−6	1	Transfer to Round 2 (League A)
4	Romania (R)	3	0	1	2	1	15	−14	1	Relegated to Round 2 (League B)

Source: UEFA
Rules for classification: Qualification tiebreakers
(H) Hosts; (R) Relegated
14 October 2023
13:00

Germany	5–0	Ukraine
Köpp 27'; Rückert 33'; Hokamp 57'; Zimmermann 71', 85'	Report

Sportschule Wedau, Duisburg
Attendance: 406
Referee: Maral Mirzai Beni (Sweden)
14 October 2023
16:00

Austria	8–0	Romania
Krassnig 5', 39', 45+11', 65'; Frătuțescu 23' (o.g.); Illinger 44'; Bauer 88'; Bertsch 90'	Report

Leichtathletikstadion BZA Wedau III, Duisburg
Attendance: 90
Referee: Lisa Benn (England)

17 October 2023
13:00

Germany	0–3	Austria
	Report	Kerschbaumer 35'; Krassnig 40', 54'

Sportschule Wedau, Duisburg
Attendance: 225
Referee: Silvia Gasperotti (Italy)
17 October 2023
16:00

Romania	0–0	Ukraine
	Report

Leichtathletikstadion BZA Wedau III, Duisburg
Attendance: 10
Referee: Lisa Benn (England)

20 October 2023
13:00

Romania	1–7	Germany
Banciu 71'	Report	Köpp 20'; Rückert 36', 45+1'; Hokamp 42', 56'; Lionte 51' (o.g.); Schiffarth 70'

Sportschule Wedau, Duisburg
Attendance: 180
Referee: Silvia Gasperotti (Italy)
20 October 2023
13:00

Ukraine	1–2	Austria
Savkina 68'	Report	Pamminger 29', 37'

Leichtathletikstadion BZA Wedau III, Duisburg
Attendance: 52
Referee: Maral Mirzai Beni (Sweden)

==== Group A5 ====
Pos	Team	Pld	W	D	L	GF	GA	GD	Pts	Promotion
1	Finland	3	3	0	0	7	0	+7	9	Transfer to Round 2 (League A)
2	Netherlands	3	2	0	1	9	3	+6	6	Transfer to Round 2 (League A)
3	Switzerland	3	1	0	2	2	6	−4	3	Transfer to Round 2 (League A)
4	Bulgaria (H, R)	3	0	0	3	2	11	−9	0	Relegated to Round 2 (League B)

Source: UEFA
Rules for classification: Qualification tiebreakers
(H) Hosts; (R) Relegated
12 October 2023
10:00

Finland	1–0	Netherlands
Todoshchenko 23'	Report

Stadium Albena 1, Albena
Attendance: 35
Referee: Martina Molinaro (Italy)
12 October 2023
14:30

Switzerland	2–0	Bulgaria
Ebersold 15'; Keller 82'	Report

Stadium Albena 1, Albena
Attendance: 25
Referee: Michaela Pachtova (Czech Republic)

15 October 2023
10:00

Switzerland	0–3	Finland
	Report	Oksanen 30', 90'; Todoshchenko 41'

Stadium Albena 1, Albena
Attendance: 35
Referee: Jelena Kumer (Croatia)
15 October 2023
14:30

Netherlands	6–2	Bulgaria
Zuidberg 34', 79'; Ivens 76'; Huisman 88', 90+1', 90+4'	Report	Boyadzhieva 36'; Petrova 62'

Stadium Albena 1, Albena
Attendance: 70
Referee: Martina Molinaro (Italy)

18 October 2023
14:30

Netherlands	3–0	Switzerland
Verkooijen 11'; Derks 29', 63'	Report

Stadion Druzhba, Dobrich
Attendance: 50
Referee: Jelena Kumer (Croatia)
18 October 2023
14:30

Bulgaria	0–3	Finland
	Report	Wusu 40'; Oksanen 65'; Paavilainen 67'

Stadium Albena 1, Albena
Attendance: 20
Referee: Michaela Pachtova (Czech Republic)

==== Group A6 ====
Pos	Team	Pld	W	D	L	GF	GA	GD	Pts	Promotion
1	England	3	3	0	0	20	0	+20	9	Transfer to Round 2 (League A)
2	Hungary (H)	3	2	0	1	3	8	−5	6	Transfer to Round 2 (League A)
3	Belgium	3	1	0	2	4	7	−3	3	Transfer to Round 2 (League A)
4	Northern Ireland (R)	3	0	0	3	0	12	−12	0	Relegated to Round 2 (League B)

Source: UEFA
Rules for classification: Qualification tiebreakers
(H) Hosts; (R) Relegated
4 November 2023
13:00

England	6–0	Northern Ireland
Harbert 14'; Jones 26', 45+1'; Draper 29', 51'; Harwood 85'	Report

BSC Stadium, Budaörs
Attendance: 72
Referee: Cansu Tryak (Turkey)
4 November 2023
16:00

Hungary	1–0	Belgium
Szabó 44'	Report

Globall Football Park, Telki
Attendance: 120
Referee: Lotta Vuorio (Finland)

7 November 2023
13:00

Belgium	4–0	Northern Ireland
Careel 29', 82'; Vanluyten 58' (pen.), 84'	Report

BSC Stadium, Budaörs
Attendance: 35
Referee: Lotta Vuorio (Finland)
7 November 2023
16:00

England	8–0	Hungary
Jones 5'; Draper 8', 37', 53', 59'; Bánfi 39' (o.g.); Fisher 68', 90+3'	Report

Globall Football Park, Telki
Attendance: 140
Referee: Silvia Gasperotti (Italy)

10 November 2023
15:00

Belgium	0–6	England
	Report	Draper 12', 68'; Jones 15', 57'; Harwood 47'; Fisher 89'

BSC Stadium, Budaörs
Attendance: 36
Referee: Silvia Gasperotti (Italy)
10 November 2023
15:00

Northern Ireland	0–2	Hungary
	Report	Gégény 36'; Conway 85' (o.g.)

Globall Football Park, Telki
Attendance: 80
Referee: Cansu Tryak (Turkey)

==== Group A7 ====
The group matches were hosted by Albania.

Pos	Team	Pld	W	D	L	GF	GA	GD	Pts	Promotion
1	Sweden	3	3	0	0	8	2	+6	9	Transfer to Round 2 (League A)
2	Denmark	3	2	0	1	11	4	+7	6	Transfer to Round 2 (League A)
3	Greece	3	0	1	2	3	7	−4	1	Transfer to Round 2 (League A)
4	Belarus (R)	3	0	1	2	2	11	−9	1	Relegated to Round 2 (League B)

Source: UEFA
Rules for classification: Qualification tiebreakers
(R) Relegated
7 November 2023
11:00

Sweden	2–0	Greece
Rolfsson 61'; Lundin 70'	Report

Niko Dovana Stadium, Durrës
Attendance: 41
Referee: Kirsty Dowle (England)
7 November 2023
14:00

Belarus	0–6	Denmark
	Report	Uhd 16', 72'; Friis 24', 78'; Moesgaard 35'; Højer 87'

Elbasan Arena, Elbasan
Attendance: 25
Referee: Olivia Tschon (Austria)

10 November 2023
11:00

Denmark	3–1	Greece
Lund 86', 90+4'; Børkop 88' (pen.)	Report	Tzourtzevits 63'

Niko Dovana Stadium, Durrës
Referee: Olivia Tschon (Austria)
10 November 2023
14:00

Sweden	3–0	Belarus
Axelsson 51'; Lundin 67' (pen.), 84'	Report

Elbasan Arena, Elbasan
Attendance: 20
Referee: Fabienne Michel (Germany)

13 November 2023
11:00

Greece	2–2	Belarus
Mougiou 27'; Ntatis 54' (pen.)	Report	Katsynel 56'; Kavaliova 90+3'

Niko Dovana Stadium, Durrës
Attendance: 22
Referee: Kirsty Dowle (England)
13 November 2023
14:00

Denmark	2–3	Sweden
Lund 42'; Højer 81'	Report	Lundin 28'; Svensson 47'; Bartholdson 69'

Elbasan Arena, Elbasan
Attendance: 30
Referee: Fabienne Michel (Germany)

=== League B ===
==== Group B1 ====
Pos	Team	Pld	W	D	L	GF	GA	GD	Pts	Promotion
1	Kosovo (H, P)	3	2	1	0	4	1	+3	7	Promotion to Round 2 (League A)
2	North Macedonia (P)	3	2	0	1	10	2	+8	6	Promotion to Round 2 (League A)
3	Armenia	3	0	2	1	2	6	−4	2	Transfer to Round 2 (League B)
4	Georgia	3	0	1	2	2	9	−7	1	Transfer to Round 2 (League B)

Source: UEFA
Rules for classification: Qualification tiebreakers
(H) Hosts; (P) Promoted
3 October 2023
12:00

Georgia	0–5	North Macedonia
	Report	Grozdanova 9', 17', 67'; Trendova 24'; Popeski 38'

Zahir Pajaziti Stadium, Podujevo
Attendance: 50
Referee: Briet Bragadottir (Iceland)
3 October 2023
15:00

Kosovo	0–0	Armenia
	Report

Fadil Vokrri Stadium, Pristina
Attendance: 198
Referee: Jurgita Mačikunytė (Lithuania)

6 October 2023
12:00

Kosovo	2–0	Georgia
Januzi 5'; Kallaba 45+4' (pen.)	Report

Zahir Pajaziti Stadium, Podujevo
Attendance: 98
Referee: Frederikke Lydia Søkjær (Denmark)
6 October 2023
15:00

North Macedonia	4–0	Armenia
Grozdanova 18'; Sahakyan 40' (o.g.); Popeski 50'; Borizoska 61'	Report

Fadil Vokrri Stadium, Pristina
Attendance: 50
Referee: Briet Bragadottir (Iceland)

9 October 2023
12:00

North Macedonia	1–2	Kosovo
Popeski 10'	Report	Feka 27'; Hoxha 84'

Fadil Vokrri Stadium, Pristina
Attendance: 183
Referee: Frederikke Lydia Søkjær (Denmark)
9 October 2023
12:00

Armenia	2–2	Georgia
Nersesian 40'; Vardanyan 45+3'	Report	Bulia 25'; Mamporia 29'

Zahir Pajaziti Stadium, Podujevo
Attendance: 22
Referee: Jurgita Mačikunytė (Lithuania)

==== Group B2 ====
Pos	Team	Pld	W	D	L	GF	GA	GD	Pts	Promotion
1	Serbia (H, P)	3	3	0	0	18	2	+16	9	Promotion to Round 2 (League A)
2	Israel	3	2	0	1	11	5	+6	6	Transfer to Round 2 (League B)
3	Latvia	3	1	0	2	5	5	0	3	Transfer to Round 2 (League B)
4	Andorra	3	0	0	3	0	22	−22	0	Transfer to Round 2 (League B)

Source: UEFA
Rules for classification: Qualification tiebreakers
(H) Hosts; (P) Promoted

The matches in group B2 were originally planned for 5, 8 and 11 November 2023. Because of the safety concerns in light of the Gaza war, matches were postponed to 27 and 30 November, and 3 December, venues and times were kept the same.

27 November 2023
11:00

Andorra	0–7	Israel
	Report	Y. Mor 5'; Vodolazov 8', 16', 40'; T. Mor 20'; Tamar 37'; Ben Israel 39'

Serbian FA Sports Center, Stara Pazova
Attendance: 10
Referee: Tatyana Sorokopudova (Kazakhstan)
27 November 2023
14:30

Serbia	3–0	Latvia
Vasić 53', 75'; Popov 70'	Report

Serbian FA Sports Center, Stara Pazova
Attendance: 100
Referee: Audrey Gerbel (France)

30 November 2023
11:00

Israel	2–0	Latvia
Vodolazov 36'; Y. Mor 71'	Report

Serbian FA Sports Center, Stara Pazova
Attendance: 30
Referee: Tatyana Sorokopudova (Kazakhstan)
30 November 2023
14:30

Serbia	10–0	Andorra
Vasić 13', 35', 53'; Falco 16' (o.g.); Sinanović 34'; Kurtes 47' (pen.); Nikolić 62'; Todorović 83', 87'; Mitić 89'	Report

Serbian FA Sports Center, Stara Pazova
Attendance: 50
Referee: Zoe Stavrou (Cyprus)

3 December 2023
13:00

Israel	2–5	Serbia
Tamar 38' (pen.); Ben Israel 45+2'	Report	Sinanović 8'; Lukić 12'; Popović 34'; Vasić 50'; Kurtes 87'

Serbian FA Sports Center, Stara Pazova
Attendance: 160
Referee: Zoe Stavrou (Cyprus)
3 December 2023
13:00

Latvia	5–0	Andorra
Andersone 12'; S. Zālīte 44'; Meijere 55'; Dzene 67'; A. Baltrušaite 90+1'	Report

Serbian FA Sports Center, Stara Pazova
Attendance: 10
Referee: Audrey Gerbel (France)

==== Group B3 ====
Pos	Team	Pld	W	D	L	GF	GA	GD	Pts	Promotion
1	Croatia (H, P)	3	3	0	0	19	0	+19	9	Promotion to Round 2 (League A)
2	Malta	3	2	0	1	6	10	−4	6	Transfer to Round 2 (League B)
3	Luxembourg	3	1	0	2	2	5	−3	3	Transfer to Round 2 (League B)
4	Azerbaijan	3	0	0	3	1	13	−12	0	Transfer to Round 2 (League B)

Source: UEFA
Rules for classification: Qualification tiebreakers
(H) Hosts; (P) Promoted
2 October 2023
12:00

Croatia	8–0	Malta
Veseli 25'; Došen 40', 49'; Pestić 45+1', 85'; Lešić 74'; Vanjak 90+1'; A. Micallef 90+3' (o.g.)	Report

Stadion Branko Čavlović-Čavlek, Karlovac
Attendance: 40
Referee: Elena Gobjila (Moldova)
2 October 2023
15:30

Azerbaijan	0–1	Luxembourg
	Report	Alves 75'

Stadion Lučko, Zagreb
Attendance: 10
Referee: Erini Pingiou (Greece)

5 October 2023
12:00

Croatia	8–0	Azerbaijan
Tomić 5', 33'; Maričić 11'; Bandula 25', 79'; Pestić 26'; Došen 45+2'; Pešut 88'	Report

Stadion Branko Čavlović-Čavlek, Karlovac
Attendance: 27
Referee: Jana Van Laere (Belgium)
5 October 2023
15:30

Luxembourg	1–2	Malta
Cabral Tavares 31'	Report	Celeste 29'; Saliba 87'

Stadion Lučko, Zagreb
Attendance: 30
Referee: Erini Pingiou (Greece)

8 October 2023
12:00

Luxembourg	0–3	Croatia
	Report	Grdiša 48'; Oto 56'; Došen 68'

Stadion Branko Čavlović-Čavlek, Karlovac
Attendance: 80
Referee: Jana Van Laere (Belgium)
8 October 2023
12:00

Malta	4–1	Azerbaijan
K. Micallef 26'; Farrugia 47', 52'; Saliba 64'	Report	K. Asadova 4'

Stadion Lučko, Zagreb
Attendance: 20
Referee: Elena Gobjila (Moldova)

==== Group B4 ====
Pos	Team	Pld	W	D	L	GF	GA	GD	Pts	Promotion
1	Wales (P)	3	3	0	0	9	0	+9	9	Promotion to Round 2 (League A)
2	Faroe Islands	3	2	0	1	5	7	−2	6	Transfer to Round 2 (League B)
3	Albania (H)	3	1	0	2	1	5	−4	3	Transfer to Round 2 (League B)
4	Kazakhstan	3	0	0	3	1	4	−3	0	Transfer to Round 2 (League B)

Source: UEFA
Rules for classification: Qualification tiebreakers
(H) Hosts; (P) Promoted
24 November 2023
11:00

Kazakhstan	1–2	Faroe Islands
Katran 85' (pen.)	Report	Trier 1'; Zakariasardóttir 42'

House of Football Natural Pitch, Tirana
Attendance: 22
Referee: Jeļena Jermolajeva (Latvia)
24 November 2023
14:00

Wales	2–0	Albania
Lewis 39'; Bowen 42'	Report

Elbasan Arena, Elbasan
Attendance: 70
Referee: Oxana Cruc (Moldova)

27 November 2023
11:00

Wales	1–0	Kazakhstan
Gregson 77'	Report

House of Football Natural Pitch, Tirana
Attendance: 37
Referee: Anastasia Mylopoulou (Greece)
27 November 2023
14:00

Faroe Islands	3–0	Albania
Dalheim 3'; Zakariasardóttir 51', 66'	Report

Elbasan Arena, Elbasan
Attendance: 80
Referee: Jeļena Jermolajeva (Latvia)

30 November 2023
14:00

Faroe Islands	0–6	Wales
	Report	Salisbury-Williams 6'; Gregson 11', 17'; El. Cole 47'; Lewis 52', 60'

House of Football Natural Pitch, Tirana
Attendance: 42
Referee: Anastasia Mylopoulou (Greece)
30 November 2023
14:00

Albania	1–0	Kazakhstan
Ndoci 50'	Report

Elbasan Arena, Elbasan
Attendance: 50
Referee: Oxana Cruc (Moldova)

==== Group B5 ====
Pos	Team	Pld	W	D	L	GF	GA	GD	Pts	Promotion
1	Slovakia (P)	2	2	0	0	7	0	+7	6	Promotion to Round 2 (League A)
2	Montenegro	2	1	0	1	4	5	−1	3	Transfer to Round 2 (League B)
3	Lithuania (H)	2	0	0	2	1	7	−6	0	Transfer to Round 2 (League B)

Source: UEFA
Rules for classification: Qualification tiebreakers
(H) Hosts; (P) Promoted
4 November 2023
11:00

Lithuania	0–3	Slovakia
	Report	Sluková 8'; Šoltysová 39'; Kramlíková 72'

LFF Stadium, Vilnius
Attendance: 60
Referee: Martina Molinaro (Italy)

7 November 2023
11:00

Slovakia	4–0	Montenegro
Havalec 6', 43'; Sluková 56'; Kramlíková 69'	Report

LFF Stadium, Vilnius
Attendance: 10
Referee: Sofik Torosyan (Armenia)

10 November 2023
11:00

Montenegro	4–1	Lithuania
Čižek 5'; Tomašević 26' (pen.); Doknić 77'; Dresaj 83' (pen.)	Report	Jokubaitytė 45+2'

LFF Stadium, Vilnius
Attendance: 43
Referee: Ifeoma Kulmala (Finland)

==== Group B6 ====
Pos	Team	Pld	W	D	L	GF	GA	GD	Pts	Promotion
1	Turkey (H, P)	2	2	0	0	9	3	+6	6	Promotion to Round 2 (League A)
2	Estonia	2	0	1	1	4	6	−2	1	Transfer to Round 2 (League B)
3	Moldova	2	0	1	1	5	9	−4	1	Transfer to Round 2 (League B)

Source: UEFA
Rules for classification: Qualification tiebreakers
(H) Hosts; (P) Promoted
6 October 2023
14:00

Turkey	6–2	Moldova
Mutlu 21', 25', 38'; Pekgöz 34'; Ecemnur Öztürk 84'; Ersen 87'	Report	Rubanovici 14', 48'

MAKÜ Istiklal Stadium, Burdur
Attendance: 1,300
Referee: Fatemeh Zangeneh (Norway)

9 October 2023
14:00

Moldova	3–3	Estonia
A. Ceban 11'; Rubanovici 42'; M. Ceban 90+7' (pen.)	Report	Õispuu 66'; Valk 74'; Jotkina 83'

MAKÜ Istiklal Stadium, Burdur
Attendance: 110
Referee: Liudmyla Telbukh (Ukraine)

12 October 2023
14:00

Estonia	1–3	Turkey
Jotkina 89'	Report	Mutlu 18', 51'; Ersen 66' (pen.)

MAKÜ Istiklal Stadium, Burdur
Attendance: 1,400
Referee: Irena Velevačkoska (North Macedonia)

==== Ranking of second-placed teams ====
To determine the best runner-up, only the results of the runner-up teams against the first and third-placed teams in their group are taken into account.

Pos	Grp	Team	Pld	W	D	L	GF	GA	GD	Pts	Qualification
1	B1	North Macedonia (P)	2	1	0	1	5	2	+3	3	Promotion to Round 2 (League A)
2	B5	Montenegro	2	1	0	1	4	5	−1	3 (Note: Ranked on disciplinary points: Montenegro: –1, Israel: –2)	
3	B2	Israel	2	1	0	1	4	5	−1	3	
4	B4	Faroe Islands	2	1	0	1	3	6	−3	3	
5	B3	Malta	2	1	0	1	2	9	−7	3	
6	B6	Estonia	2	0	1	1	4	6	−2	1	

Source: UEFA
Rules for classification: 1) points; 2) goal difference; 3) goals scored; 4) disciplinary points; 5) coefficient ranking.
(P) Promoted

== Round 2 ==
=== Draw ===
The teams were seeded according to their results in the Round 1 (Regulations Article 15.01).

Teams entering League A

The 21 teams of Round 1 League A and the 7 teams of Round 1 League B (six group winners and the best runner-up) were drawn in seven groups of four teams. The draw for both leagues was held on 8 December 2023 at the UEFA headquarters in Nyon, Switzerland.

All group winners and the best runner-up of League B were automatically seeded into Pot D. Because League B has two groups with only 3 teams, the results of the group winners against the respective fourth-placed teams are disregarded for their ranking.

Pos	Grp	Team	Pld	W	D	L	GF	GA	GD	Pts	Seeding
1	A6	England	3	3	0	0	20	0	+20	9	Pot A
2	A1	Spain	3	3	0	0	16	2	+14	9	Pot A
3	A3	France	3	3	0	0	15	3	+12	9	Pot A
4	A2	Poland	3	3	0	0	13	1	+12	9 (Note: Ranked on coefficient rankings: Poland: Pot 1, Austria: Pot 3)	Pot A
5	A4	Austria	3	3	0	0	13	1	+12	9	Pot A
6	A5	Finland	3	3	0	0	7	0	+7	9	Pot A
7	A7	Sweden	3	3	0	0	8	2	+6	9	Pot A
8	A4	Germany	3	2	0	1	12	4	+8	6	Pot B
9	A7	Denmark	3	2	0	1	11	4	+7	6	Pot B
10	A5	Netherlands	3	2	0	1	9	3	+6	6	Pot B
11	A2	Norway	3	2	0	1	4	4	0	6 (Note: Ranked on disciplinary points: Norway: –1, Portugal: –4)	Pot B
12	A1	Portugal	3	2	0	1	4	4	0	6	Pot B
13	A6	Hungary	3	2	0	1	3	8	−5	6	Pot B
14	A3	Italy	3	1	1	1	9	6	+3	4	Pot B
15	A3	Scotland	3	1	1	1	5	6	−1	4	Pot C
16	A6	Belgium	3	1	0	2	4	7	−3	3	Pot C
17	A1	Czech Republic	3	1	0	2	2	5	−3	3	Pot C
18	A2	Iceland	3	1	0	2	4	8	−4	3	Pot C
19	A5	Switzerland	3	1	0	2	2	6	−4	3	Pot C
20	A7	Greece	3	0	1	2	3	7	−4	1	Pot C
21	A4	Ukraine	3	0	1	2	1	7	−6	1	Pot C
22	B3	Croatia	2	2	0	0	11	0	+11	6	Pot D
23	B4	Wales	2	2	0	0	8	0	+8	6	Pot D
24	B5	Slovakia	2	2	0	0	7	0	+7	6	Pot D
25	B6	Turkey	2	2	0	0	9	3	+6	6	Pot D
26	B2	Serbia	2	2	0	0	8	2	+6	6	Pot D
27	B1	Kosovo	2	1	1	0	2	1	+1	4	Pot D
28	B1	North Macedonia	2	1	0	1	5	2	+3	3	Pot D

Source: UEFA
Rules for classification: 1) Round 1 position; 2) points; 3) goal difference; 4) goals scored; 5) disciplinary points; 6) coefficient.
Notes:

Teams entering League B

The six best fourth-placed teams in League A were automatically seeded into Pot A, with the worst fourth-placed team being seeded into Pot B. The remaining second-, third- and fourth-placed teams from League B were seeded into Pots B, C and D, respectively.

As before, because League B has two groups with only 3 teams, the results against fourth-placed teams in Round 1 are disregarded for the ranking of teams placed second and third in League B Round 1.

Pos	Grp	Team	Pld	W	D	L	GF	GA	GD	Pts	Seeding
1	A7	Belarus	3	0	1	2	2	11	−9	1	Pot A
2	A4	Romania	3	0	1	2	1	15	−14	1	Pot A
3	A2	Republic of Ireland	3	0	0	3	2	10	−8	0	Pot A
4	A5	Bulgaria	3	0	0	3	2	11	−9	0	Pot A
5	A1	Bosnia and Herzegovina	3	0	0	3	1	12	−11	0	Pot A
6	A6	Northern Ireland	3	0	0	3	0	12	−12	0	Pot A
7	A3	Slovenia	3	0	0	3	1	15	−14	0	Pot B
8	B5	Montenegro	2	1	0	1	4	5	−1	3 (Note: Ranked on disciplinary points: Montenegro: –1, Israel: –2)	Pot B
9	B2	Israel	2	1	0	1	4	5	−1	3	Pot B
10	B4	Faroe Islands	2	1	0	1	3	6	−3	3	Pot B
11	B3	Malta	2	1	0	1	2	9	−7	3	Pot B
12	B6	Estonia	2	0	1	1	4	6	−2	1	Pot B
13	B6	Moldova	2	0	1	1	5	9	−4	1	Pot C
14	B1	Armenia	2	0	1	1	0	4	−4	1	Pot C
15	B3	Luxembourg	2	0	0	2	1	5	−4	0	Pot C
16	B2	Latvia	2	0	0	2	0	5	−5	0 (Note: Ranked on disciplinary points: Latvia: –4, Albania: –5)	Pot C
17	B4	Albania	2	0	0	2	0	5	−5	0	Pot C
18	B5	Lithuania	2	0	0	2	1	7	−6	0	Pot C
19	B1	Georgia	3	0	1	2	2	9	−7	1	Pot D
20	B4	Kazakhstan	3	0	0	3	1	4	−3	0	Pot D
21	B3	Azerbaijan	3	0	0	3	1	13	−12	0	Pot D
22	B2	Andorra	3	0	0	3	0	22	−22	0	Pot D

Source: UEFA
Rules for classification: 1) Round 1 position; 2) points; 3) goal difference; 4) goals scored; 5) disciplinary points; 6) coefficient.

=== League A ===
Times are CET/CEST, (Note: CET (UTC+1) for dates up to 26 March 2023, and CEST (UTC+2) for dates thereafter.) as listed by UEFA (local times, if different, are in parentheses).

==== Group A1 ====
Pos	Team	Pld	W	D	L	GF	GA	GD	Pts	Promotion
1	France	3	2	1	0	8	1	+7	7	Qualified for the final tournament
2	Germany (H)	3	1	1	1	3	2	+1	4	
3	Czech Republic	3	0	3	0	1	1	0	3	
4	Slovakia (R)	3	0	1	2	1	9	−8	1	Relegated to League B for the next tournament qualification

Source: UEFA
Rules for classification: Qualification tiebreakers
(H) Hosts; (R) Relegated
18 March 2024
12:30

Czech Republic	0–0	Germany
	Report

Eilenriedestadion, Hanover
Attendance: 304
Referee: Lotta Vuorio (Finland)
18 March 2024
16:30

France	6–0	Slovakia
Sylejmani 22' (pen.), 54'; Rouquet 49'; Gay 61'; Ahmadou 65'; Tene 77'	Report

Eilenriedestadion, Hanover
Attendance: 32
Referee: María Eugenia Gil Soriano (Spain)

21 March 2024
13:00

Germany	2–0	Slovakia
Memminger 5'; Winter 23'	Report

Wilhelm-Langrehr-Stadion, Garbsen
Attendance: 225
Referee: Lotta Vuorio (Finland)
21 March 2024
17:00

France	0–0	Czech Republic
	Report

Wilhelm-Langrehr-Stadion, Garbsen
Attendance: 67
Referee: Martina Molinaro (Italy)

24 March 2024
13:00

Germany	1–2	France
Winter 57'	Report	Bacoul-Juillard 45'; Rouquet 72'

Wilhelm-Langrehr-Stadion, Garbsen
Referee: Martina Molinaro (Italy)
24 March 2024
13:00

Slovakia	1–1	Czech Republic
Kramlíková 34'	Report	Trachtová 74'

August-Wenzel-Stadion, Barsinghausen
Referee: María Eugenia Gil Soriano (Spain)

==== Group A2 ====
Pos	Team	Pld	W	D	L	GF	GA	GD	Pts	Promotion
1	Portugal (H)	3	3	0	0	5	1	+4	9	Qualified for the final tournament
2	Finland	3	2	0	1	8	4	+4	6	
3	Iceland	3	1	0	2	5	3	+2	3	
4	Kosovo (R)	3	0	0	3	0	10	−10	0	Relegated to League B for the next tournament qualification

Source: UEFA
Rules for classification: Qualification tiebreakers
(H) Hosts; (R) Relegated
21 February 2024
12:00

Finland	5–0	Kosovo
Todoshchenko 7', 71', 76'; Oksanen 49'; Aalto 77'	Report

Estádio do Real SC, Queluz
Attendance: 52
Referee: Frederikke Lydia Søkjær (Denmark)
21 February 2024
16:00

Iceland	0–1	Portugal
	Report	Florentino 39'

Cidade do Futebol, Oeiras
Referee: Sofik Torosyan (Armenia)

24 February 2024
12:00

Portugal	1–0	Kosovo
Melo 64'	Report

Cidade do Futebol, Oeiras
Referee: Sofik Torosyan (Armenia)
24 February 2024
17:00

Finland	2–1	Iceland
Todoshchenko 15'; Jääskä 87'	Report	Knudsen 50'

Estádio do Real SC, Queluz
Referee: Louise Thompson (Northern Ireland)

27 February 2024
16:00

Portugal	3–1	Finland
Florentino 22'; Nave 66'; Simões 76' (pen.)	Report	Todoshchenko 30'

Cidade do Futebol, Oeiras
Referee: Louise Thompson (Northern Ireland)
27 February 2024
16:00

Kosovo	0–4	Iceland
	Report	Pálmadóttir 11'; R. Jónsdóttir 59'; H. Jónsdóttir 76', 87'

Estádio do Real SC, Queluz
Referee: Frederikke Lydia Søkjær (Denmark)

==== Group A3 ====
Pos	Team	Pld	W	D	L	GF	GA	GD	Pts	Promotion
1	Belgium	3	2	0	1	5	4	+1	6 (Note: Ranked on head-to-head points: Belgium: 3, Austria: 0)	Qualified for the final tournament
2	Austria	3	2	0	1	7	3	+4	6	
3	Croatia (H)	3	1	0	2	1	3	−2	3 (Note: Ranked on head-to-head points: Croatia: 3, Hungary: 0)	
4	Hungary (R)	3	1	0	2	2	5	−3	3	Relegated to League B for the next tournament qualification

Source: UEFA
Rules for classification: Qualification tiebreakers
(H) Hosts; (R) Relegated
Notes:
8 March 2024
12:30

Austria	2–0	Croatia
Pamminger 42'; Pestić 54' (o.g.)	Report

Stadion Hrvatski vitezovi, Dugopolje
Referee: Melek Dakan (Turkey)
8 March 2024
15:00

Belgium	1–2	Hungary
Careel 26'	Report	Gégény 8'; Brekovszki 74'

Andelko Marusic-Ferata, Omiš
Referee: Louise Thompson (Northern Ireland)

11 March 2024
15:00

Austria	2–3	Belgium
Krassnig 7'; Lueger 82'	Report	Heremans 5'; Haentjens 41'; Glabonjat 59' (o.g.)

Stadion Hrvatski vitezovi, Dugopolje
Referee: Lovisa Johansson (Sweden)
11 March 2024
12:30

Hungary	0–1	Croatia
	Report	Grdiša 41'

Andelko Marusic-Ferata, Omiš
Referee: Louise Thompson (Northern Ireland)

14 March 2024
12:30

Hungary	0–3	Austria
	Report	Krassnig 26', 90+4'; Pamminger 28'

Andelko Marusic-Ferata, Omiš
Referee: Lovisa Johansson (Sweden)
14 March 2024
12:30

Croatia	0–1	Belgium
	Report	Haentjens 90'

Stadion Hrvatski vitezovi, Dugopolje
Referee: Melek Dakan (Turkey)

==== Group A4 ====
Pos	Team	Pld	W	D	L	GF	GA	GD	Pts	Promotion
1	Norway (H)	3	2	1	0	4	2	+2	7	Qualified for the final tournament
2	Switzerland	3	2	0	1	5	3	+2	6	
3	Wales	3	0	2	1	3	5	−2	2	
4	Sweden (R)	3	0	1	2	1	3	−2	1	Relegated to League B for the next tournament qualification

Source: UEFA
Rules for classification: Qualification tiebreakers
(H) Hosts; (R) Relegated
11 March 2024
11:00

Sweden	1–1	Wales
Lundin 15'	Report	Scarlett 74'

Sandnes Stadion, Sandnes
Referee: Cansu Tryak (Turkey)
11 March 2024
16:00

Switzerland	1–2	Norway
Hinder 64'	Report	Kerim-Lindland 28', 55'

Sandnes Stadion, Sandnes
Referee: Michaela Pachtova (Czechia)

14 March 2024
11:00

Sweden	0–1	Switzerland
	Report	Hinder 16'

Sandnes Stadion, Sandnes
Referee: Caroline Lanssens (Belgium)
14 March 2024
16:00

Norway	1–1	Wales
Thorhallsson 13'	Report	El. Cole 72'

Sandnes Stadion, Sandnes
Referee: Michaela Pachtova (Czechia)

17 March 2024
13:00

Norway	1–0	Sweden
Kerim-Lindland 23'	Report

Sandnes Stadion, Sandnes
Referee: Caroline Lanssens (Belgium)
17 March 2024
13:00

Wales	1–3	Switzerland
Salisbury-Williams 78'	Report	Bianchi 39'; Ammann 72'; Looser 75'

Sandnes Stadion, Sandnes
Referee: Cansu Tryak (Turkey)

==== Group A5 ====
Pos	Team	Pld	W	D	L	GF	GA	GD	Pts	Promotion
1	Spain	3	3	0	0	14	1	+13	9	Qualified for the final tournament
2	Netherlands (H)	3	2	0	1	11	4	+7	6	
3	Turkey	3	1	0	2	2	15	−13	3	
4	Ukraine (R)	3	0	0	3	0	7	−7	0	Relegated to League B for the next tournament qualification

Source: UEFA
Rules for classification: Qualification tiebreakers
(H) Hosts; (R) Relegated
14 March 2024
19:00

Spain	9–0	Turkey
Segura 8'; Cerrato 14', 19', 31', 62', 64'; Comendador 37'; Arufe 42'; Cristóbal 83'	Report

Sportpark Juliana, 's-Gravenzande
Attendance: 236
Referee: Joanna Vassallo (Malta)
14 March 2024
20:00 (Note: The match, originally scheduled for 19:00, began one hour later due to floodlight failure in the stadium.)

Ukraine	0–4	Netherlands
	Report	Huisman 2'; Renfurm 44'; Zuidberg 45+1'; Ivens 59' (pen.)

Gemeentelijk Sportpark S.J.C., Noordwijk
Attendance: 450
Referee: Nanna Løf Andersen (Denmark)

17 March 2024
15:00

Netherlands	6–1	Turkey
Koopman 6', 54'; Scholten 24', 75'; Boerboom 32'; Lont 45+1' (pen.)	Report	Yetim 85'

Sportpark Juliana, 's-Gravenzande
Attendance: 1,783
Referee: Nanna Løf Andersen (Denmark)
17 March 2024
15:00 (Note: The matches on 17 and 20 March (except Netherlands vs. Turkey) were originally scheduled for 19:00, but were moved to 15:00 due to faulty floodlights in Gemeentelijk Sportpark S.J.C., Noordwijk.)

Spain	2–0	Ukraine
García 43'; Cerrato 68'	Report

Gemeentelijk Sportpark S.J.C., Noordwijk
Attendance: 115
Referee: Audrey Gerbel (France)

20 March 2024
15:00

Netherlands	1–3	Spain
Lont 90+4'	Report	Gómez 63'; Ortega 76'; Escot 85'

Gemeentelijk Sportpark S.J.C., Noordwijk
Referee: Audrey Gerbel (France)
20 March 2024
15:00

Turkey	1–0	Ukraine
Ersen 76'	Report

Sportpark Juliana, 's-Gravenzande
Referee: Joanna Vassallo (Malta)

==== Group A6 ====
Pos	Team	Pld	W	D	L	GF	GA	GD	Pts	Promotion
1	England	3	3	0	0	8	1	+7	9	Qualified for the final tournament
2	Italy	3	2	0	1	5	3	+2	6	
3	Greece	3	1	0	2	2	6	−4	3	
4	Serbia (H, R)	3	0	0	3	1	6	−5	0	Relegated to League B for the next tournament qualification

Source: UEFA
Rules for classification: Qualification tiebreakers
(H) Hosts; (R) Relegated
10 March 2024
11:00

Greece	0–3	Italy
	Report	Galli 13'; Ventriglia 60'; Guglielmini 79'

Serbian FA Sports Center, Stara Pazova
Referee: Miriama Bočková (Slovakia)
10 March 2024
14:30

England	3–0	Serbia
Jones 41'; Draper 81'; Brown 90+1'	Report

Serbian FA Sports Center, Stara Pazova
Referee: Karoline Marie Jensen (Norway)

13 March 2024
11:00

England	2–0	Greece
Draper 25'; Fisher 77'	Report

Serbian FA Sports Center, Stara Pazova
Referee: Olivia Tschon (Austria)
13 March 2024
14:30

Italy	1–0	Serbia
Galli 80'	Report

Serbian FA Sports Center, Stara Pazova
Referee: Miriama Bočková (Slovakia)

16 March 2024
13:00

Italy	1–3	England
Ferraresi 44'	Report	Jones 23'; Gray 47'; Brown 50'

Serbian FA Sports Center, Stara Pazova
Referee: Olivia Tschon (Austria)
16 March 2024
13:00

Serbia	1–2	Greece
Sinanović 90'	Report	Ntatis 79'; Nanou 82'

Serbian FA Sports Center, Stara Pazova
Referee: Karoline Marie Jensen (Norway)

==== Group A7 ====
Pos	Team	Pld	W	D	L	GF	GA	GD	Pts	Promotion
1	Poland (H)	3	3	0	0	17	1	+16	9	Qualified for the final tournament
2	Scotland	3	2	0	1	9	5	+4	6	
3	Denmark	3	1	0	2	3	4	−1	3	
4	North Macedonia (R)	3	0	0	3	0	19	−19	0	Relegated to League B for the next tournament qualification

Source: UEFA
Rules for classification: Qualification tiebreakers
(H) Hosts; (R) Relegated
13 March 2024
14:00

Poland	9–0	North Macedonia
Araśniewicz 15'; Dodevska 23' (o.g.); Zwiazek 29'; Lapinska 45+2'; Flis 50'; Witek 53' (pen.); Skrzypczyk 74'; Bartczak 84'; Wyrwas 88'	Report

Swarzedz, Swarzędz
Referee: Jelena Kumer (Croatia)
13 March 2024
14:00

Scotland	1–0	Denmark
Berry 45'	Report

Municipal Stadium, Śrem
Referee: Maïka Vanderstichel (France)

16 March 2024
14:00

Poland	5–1	Scotland
Lapinska 21', 27'; Araśniewicz 45+1'; Zwiazek 66', 86'	Report	Murray 41'

Plewiska Stadium, Plewiska
Referee: Ioanna Allayiotou (Cyprus)
16 March 2024
14:00

Denmark	3–0	North Macedonia
Højer 3', 7'; Thomsen 26'	Report

Miejski Września, Września
Referee: Maïka Vanderstichel (France)

19 March 2024
14:00

Denmark	0–3	Poland
	Report	Zwiazek 35'; Ostrowska 84'; Rogus 90+4'

Plewiska Stadium, Plewiska
Referee: Ioanna Allayiotou (Cyprus)
19 March 2024
14:00

North Macedonia	0–7	Scotland
	Report	McStay 32'; Berry 35', 45+1', 65' (pen.), 75'; Boyce 57'; McArthur 82'

Miejski Września, Września
Referee: Jelena Kumer (Croatia)

=== League B ===
==== Group B1 ====
Pos	Team	Pld	W	D	L	GF	GA	GD	Pts	Promotion
1	Belarus (P)	3	3	0	0	14	2	+12	9	Promoted to League A for the next tournament qualification
2	Montenegro (H)	3	2	0	1	6	8	−2	6	
3	Lithuania	3	1	0	2	5	6	−1	3	
4	Andorra	3	0	0	3	0	9	−9	0	

Source: UEFA
Rules for classification: Qualification tiebreakers
(H) Hosts; (P) Promoted
11 March 2024
14:00

Lithuania	2–3	Montenegro
Blaževičūtė 16', 90'	Report	Nikčević 7'; Čižek 17'; Lukovic 70'

Stadion pod Vrmcem, Kotor
Referee: Vanja Jankovic (Slovenia)
12 March 2024
11:30

Belarus	5–0	Andorra
Katsynel 1'; Pratasiuk 4', 19'; Marchuk 55', 90'	Report

Stadion Topolica, Bar
Referee: Farida Lutfaliyeva (Azerbaijan)

14 March 2024
11:30

Belarus	3–0	Lithuania
Bareika 6'; Pratasiuk 37'; Kavaliova 86'	Report

Stadion Topolica, Bar
Referee: Teresa Oliveira (Portugal)
14 March 2024
14:00

Montenegro	1–0	Andorra
Boričić 39'	Report

Stadion Mitar Mićo Goliš, Petrovac
Referee: Farida Lutfaliyeva (Azerbaijan)

17 March 2024
14:00

Montenegro	2–6	Belarus
Tomašević 14'; Dresaj 27'	Report	Rabrova 6', 10', 51'; Pratasiuk 7', 86'; Kaliuta 74'

Podgorica City Stadium, Podgorica
Referee: Teresa Oliveira (Portugal)
17 March 2024
14:00

Andorra	0–3	Lithuania
	Report	Jokubaitytė 73'; Blaževičūtė 81', 88'

Camp FSCG, Podgorica
Referee: Vanja Jankovic (Slovenia)

==== Group B2 ====
Pos	Team	Pld	W	D	L	GF	GA	GD	Pts	Promotion
1	Bulgaria (H, P)	3	2	1	0	13	2	+11	7	Promoted to League A for the next tournament qualification
2	Slovenia (P)	3	2	1	0	11	1	+10	7	Promoted to League A for the next tournament qualification
3	Azerbaijan	3	1	0	2	5	11	−6	3	
4	Moldova	3	0	0	3	1	16	−15	0	

Source: UEFA
Rules for classification: Qualification tiebreakers
(H) Hosts; (P) Promoted
14 March 2024
10:00

Moldova	0–6	Slovenia
	Report	Gerbec 6'; Šrot 8'; Zajc 18'; Osolnik 21', 69'; Omerza 90'

Stadion Hadzhi Dimitar, Sliven
Referee: Stacey Pearson (England)
14 March 2024
14:30

Bulgaria	6–1	Azerbaijan
Mihaleva 4'; Duleva 43'; Dimanova 49'; Baliova 50'; Salamzada 70' (o.g.); Mitova 90+2'	Report	Asadova 25'

Stadion Hadzhi Dimitar, Sliven
Referee: Laura Mauricio (Switzerland)

17 March 2024
10:00

Slovenia	4–0	Azerbaijan
Gerbec 12', 20'; Omerza 52'; Osolnik 84' (pen.)	Report

Stadion Hadzhi Dimitar, Sliven
Referee: Stacey Pearson (England)
17 March 2024
14:30

Bulgaria	6–0	Moldova
Halyanova 9'; Dimanova 18', 45', 88', 90+7' (pen.); Baliova 49'	Report

Stadion Hadzhi Dimitar, Sliven
Referee: Tatyana Sorokopudova (Kazakhstan)

20 March 2024
14:30

Slovenia	1–1	Bulgaria
Osolnik 23'	Report	Parnarova 37'

Stadion Hadzhi Dimitar, Sliven
Referee: Tatyana Sorokopudova (Kazakhstan)
20 March 2024
14:30

Azerbaijan	4–1	Moldova
Salamzada 7' (pen.); Alipashayeva 25', 63'; K. Asadova 78'	Report	Ceban 88'

Stadion Beroe, Stara Zagora
Referee: Laura Mauricio (Switzerland)

==== Group B3 ====
Pos	Team	Pld	W	D	L	GF	GA	GD	Pts	Promotion
1	Faroe Islands (H, P)	3	2	0	1	6	3	+3	6 (Note: Tied on head-to-head points (3). Head-to-head goal difference: Faroe Islands +1, Romania 0, Latvia −1.)	Promoted to League A for the next tournament qualification
2	Romania	3	2	0	1	5	4	+1	6	
3	Latvia	3	2	0	1	7	3	+4	6	
4	Georgia	3	0	0	3	1	9	−8	0	

Source: UEFA
Rules for classification: Qualification tiebreakers
(H) Hosts; (P) Promoted
Notes:
17 March 2024
14:00

Latvia	2–1	Faroe Islands
Andersone 41', 54'	Report	Trier 64'

Tórsvøllur, Tórshavn
Referee: Milica Milovanovic (Serbia)
17 March 2024
18:00

Romania	2–1	Georgia
Menard 16'; Niculescu 41'	Report	Tsikaridze 78'

Tórsvøllur, Tórshavn
Referee: Eglantina Pjetrushaj (Albania)

20 March 2024
14:00

Faroe Islands	2–0	Georgia
Zakariasardóttir 67', 86'	Report

Tórsvøllur, Tórshavn
Referee: Milica Milovanovic (Serbia)
20 March 2024
18:00

Romania	2–0	Latvia
Zamfir 29'; Niculescu 62'	Report

Tórsvøllur, Tórshavn
Referee: Andromachi Tsiofliki (Greece)

23 March 2024
18:00

Faroe Islands	3–1	Romania
Zakariasardóttir 16'; Le. Djurhuus 45+1'; Trier 58'	Report	Șipoș 90+2'

Tórsvøllur, Tórshavn
23 March 2024
18:00

Georgia	0–5	Latvia
	Report	Reinfelde 27', 56'; Dūmiņa 39'; Dzene 41', 90+1'

Gundadalur, Tórshavn

==== Group B4 ====
Pos	Team	Pld	W	D	L	GF	GA	GD	Pts	Promotion
1	Bosnia and Herzegovina (P)	3	3	0	0	14	1	+13	9	Promoted to League A for the next tournament qualification
2	Estonia	3	2	0	1	7	5	+2	6	
3	Kazakhstan (H)	3	1	0	2	8	5	+3	3	
4	Armenia	3	0	0	3	0	18	−18	0	

Source: UEFA
Rules for classification: Qualification tiebreakers
(H) Hosts; (P) Promoted
18 March 2024
08:00

Bosnia and Herzegovina	3–1	Kazakhstan
Milićević 42', 44' (pen.); Erkić 75'	Report	Akhmetzhan 24'

Sports and training base of the Kazakhstan Football Federation, Talgar
Attendance: 100
Referee: Jeļena Jermolajeva (Latvia)
18 March 2024
12:00

Armenia	0–5	Estonia
	Report	Smirnova 20'; Kelli 33'; Heide 45+5'; Tamm 57'; Männiste 61'

FC Kairat Academy, Almaty
Attendance: 77
Referee: Elena Gobjila (Moldova)

21 March 2024
12:00

Bosnia and Herzegovina	6–0	Armenia
Laketić 21'; Kekic 44', 49', 54', 68'; Jurić 71'	Report

FC Kairat Academy, Almaty
Attendance: 50
Referee: Fatemeh Zangeneh (Norway)
21 March 2024
08:00

Estonia	2–0	Kazakhstan
Männiste 57'; Uzjukina 81'	Report

Sports and training base of the Kazakhstan Football Federation, Talgar
Attendance: 120
Referee: Elena Gobjila (Moldova)

24 March 2024
09:00

Estonia	0–5	Bosnia and Herzegovina
	Report	Rankić 30', 87'; Kekic 41'; Mirković 53'; Erkić 71'

Attendance: FC Kairat Academy, Almaty
24 March 2024
09:00

Kazakhstan	7–0	Armenia
Rakhatzhan 8', 35'; Zeken 72' (p), 76'; Tuchina 83' (p); Tsyganova 88', 90'	Report

Sports and training base of the Kazakhstan Football Federation, Talgar

==== Group B5 ====
Pos	Team	Pld	W	D	L	GF	GA	GD	Pts	Promotion
1	Northern Ireland (P)	2	2	0	0	9	2	+7	6	Promoted to League A for the next tournament qualification
2	Luxembourg	2	0	1	1	2	5	−3	1	
3	Malta (H)	2	0	1	1	2	6	−4	1	

Source: UEFA
Rules for classification: Qualification tiebreakers
(H) Hosts; (P) Promoted
21 February 2024
11:00

Malta	1–5	Northern Ireland
Bartolo 24'	Report	Breen 5'; Boothroyd 15'; Conway 26'; Ferreira 84', 86'

Centenary Stadium, Ta' Qali
Attendance: 273
Referee: Oxana Crux (Moldova)

24 February 2024
11:00

Northern Ireland	4–1	Luxembourg
Boothroyd 45+1'; Conway 58'; Breen 81'; Moore 90+3'	Report	Alves 72'

Centenary Stadium, Ta' Qali
Referee: Rita Vehapi (Kosovo)

27 February 2024
11:00

Luxembourg	1–1	Malta
Morvilli 6'	Report	Saliba 52'

Centenary Stadium, Ta' Qali
Referee: Marisca Overtoom (Netherlands)

==== Group B6 ====
Pos	Team	Pld	W	D	L	GF	GA	GD	Pts	Promotion
1	Republic of Ireland (P)	2	2	0	0	10	1	+9	6	Promoted to League A for the next tournament qualification
2	Israel	2	1	0	1	3	4	−1	3	
3	Albania (H)	2	0	0	2	2	10	−8	0	

Source: UEFA
Rules for classification: Qualification tiebreakers
(H) Hosts; (P) Promoted
20 February 2024
14:00

Albania	1–7	Republic of Ireland
Ndoj 72'	Report	O'Brien 26', 90+2'; Dodd 50'; Lawlee 70'; Melia 75'; Sena 82'; Tierney 89'

Arena Kombëtare, Tirana
Attendance: 167
Referee: Farida Lutfaliyeva (Azerbaijan)

23 February 2024
11:30

Republic of Ireland	3–0	Israel
Butler 9'; O'Rourke 57'; Carmeli 90+4' (o.g.)	Report

Arena Kombëtare, Tirana
Referee: Jana Van Laere (Belgium)

26 February 2024
14:00

Albania	1–3	Israel
Ago 11'	Report	Ben Israel 23'; Elmaleh 34'; Cohen 37'

Arena Kombëtare, Tirana
Referee: Eirini Pingiou (Greece)

==== Ranking of second-placed teams ====
To determine the best runner-up, only the results of the runner-up teams against the first and third-placed teams in their group are taken into account.

Pos	Grp	Team	Pld	W	D	L	GF	GA	GD	Pts	Qualification
1	B2	Slovenia (P)	2	1	1	0	5	1	+4	4	Promoted to League A for the next tournament qualification
2	B3	Romania	2	1	0	1	3	3	0	3	
3	B6	Israel	2	1	0	1	3	4	−1	3	
4	B1	Montenegro	2	1	0	1	5	8	−3	3	
5	B4	Estonia	2	1	0	1	2	5	−3	3	
6	B5	Luxembourg	2	0	1	1	2	5	−3	1	

Source: UEFA
Rules for classification: 1) points; 2) goal difference; 3) goals scored; 4) disciplinary points; 5) coefficient; 6) drawing of lots.
(P) Promoted

== Qualified teams ==
Seven teams qualified for the final tournament along with hosts Sweden.

Team	Qualified as	Qualified on	Previous appearances in Under-17 Euro^{1} only U-17 era (since 2008)
Sweden	Hosts	19 April 2021	2 (2013, 2023)
France	Round 2 Group A1 winners	24 March 2024	9 (2008, 2009, 2011, 2012, 2014, 2015, 2017, 2022, **2023**)
Portugal	Round 2 Group A2 winners	27 February 2024	2 (2014, 2019)
Belgium	Round 2 Group A3 winners	14 March 2024	1 (2013)
Norway	Round 2 Group A4 winners	17 March 2024	5 (2009, 2015, 2016, 2017, 2022)
Spain	Round 2 Group A5 winners	20 March 2024	12 (2009, **2010**, **2011**, 2013, 2014, **2015**, 2016, 2017, **2018**, 2019, 2022, 2023)
England	Round 2 Group A6 winners	16 March 2024	8 (2008, 2014, 2015, 2016, 2017, 2018, 2019, 2023)
Poland	Round 2 Group A7 winners	19 March 2024	3 (**2013**, 2018, 2023)

^{1} Bold indicates champions for that year. Italic indicates hosts for that year.

== Goalscorers ==
In the 1st Round there were 300 goals scored in 72 matches, for an average of 4.17 goals per match.

In the 2nd Round there have been 200 goals scored in 54 matches, for an average of 3.7 goals per match (as of 18 March 2024).

In total, there have been 500 goals scored in 126 matches, for an average of 3.97 goals per match (as of 18 March 2024).

10 goals

- (England) Denny Draper
- (Spain) Alba Cerrato

9 goals

- (Austria) Tina Krassnig

7 goals

- (England) Vera Jones
- (Finland) Jelena Todoshchenko

6 goals

- (Serbia) Teodora Vasić

5 goals

- (Belarus) Darya Pratasiuk
- (Bulgaria) Nikol Dimanova
- (Italy) Eleonora Ferraresi
- (Poland) Oliwia Zwiazek
- (Sweden) Ella Lundin
- (Turkey) Elif Ceren Mutlu

4 goals

- (Austria) Alessia Pamminger
- (Croatia) Marija Došen
- (Denmark) Flora Højer
- (England) Isabella Fisher
- (Finland) Laura Oksanen
- (Israel) Sofia Vodolazov
- (Italy) Rosanna Ventriglia
- (Lithuania) Justina Blaževičūtė
- (Netherlands) Yada Huisman
- (North Macedonia) Melanija Grozdanova
- (Norway) Anny Kerim-Lindland
- (Poland) Weronika Araśniewicz
- (Poland) Oliwia Lapinska
- (Slovenia) Ula Osolnik
- (Spain) Ainoa Gómez
- (Spain) Celia Segura

3 goals

- (Belarus) Alena Rabrova
- (Belgium) Oona Careel
- (Croatia) Mia Pestić
- (Denmark) Amalie Lund
- (Faroe Islands) Brá Zakariasardóttir
- (France) Auryane Abdourahim
- (France) Lina Gay
- (France) Léa Sylejmani
- (France) Djenna-Léna Tene
- (Germany) Merle Hokamp
- (Germany) Rosa Rückert
- (Iceland) Hrefna Jónsdóttir
- Maayan Ben Israel
- (Italy) Giulia Galli
- (Latvia) Gabriela Annija Andersone
- (Malta) Sara Saliba
- (Moldova) Victoria Rubanovici
- (Netherlands) Zoe Zuidberg
- (North Macedonia) Kalina Popeski
- (Poland) Zuzanna Witek
- (Scotland) Sophia Martin
- (Serbia) Hana Sinanović
- (Slovenia) Špela Gerbec
- (Wales) Casi Gregson
- (Wales) Nia Lewis

2 goals

- (Azerbaijan) Khanim Asadova
- (Belarus) Dziyana Katsynel
- (Belarus) Anastasiya Kavaliova
- (Belarus) Lizaveta Marchuk
- (Belgium) Louize Haentjens
- (Belgium) Lola Vanluyten
- (Bosnia and Herzegovina) Bogdana Milićević
- (Bulgaria) Monika Baliova
- (Croatia) Petra Bandula
- (Croatia) Ana Grdiša
- (Croatia) Štefani Tomić
- (Denmark) Lærke Friis
- (Denmark) Josefine Hansen Uhd
- (England) Lola Brown
- (England) Sophie Harwood
- (Estonia) Anželika Jotkina
- (Faroe Islands) Silja Rasnarsdóttir Trier
- (France) Ornella Graziani
- (France) Ambre Ouazar
- (France) Justine Rouquet
- (Germany) Leonie Köpp
- (Germany) Tessa Zimmermann
- (Greece) Ioanna Ntatis
- (Hungary) Petra Gégény
- (Iceland) Ragnheiđur Þórunn Jónsdóttir
- (Iceland) Thelma Karen Pálmadóttir
- (Israel) Yarden Mor
- (Israel) Goren Tamar
- (Lithuania) Austėja Jokubaitytė
- (Luxembourg) Lena Alves
- (Malta) Lexine Farrugia
- (Montenegro) Darija Čižek
- (Montenegro) Angelina Dresaj
- (Montenegro) Maša Tomašević
- (Netherlands) Ranneke Derks
- (Netherlands) Rose Ivens
- (Netherlands) Kyra Ching Koopman
- (Netherlands) Kiki Scholten
- (Northern Ireland) Niamh Boothroyd
- (Northern Ireland) Rhianna Breen
- (Northern Ireland) Gracie Conway
- (Northern Ireland) Bernadette Ferreira
- (Poland) Krystyna Flis
- (Poland) Julia Ostrowska
- (Poland) Anna Skrzypczyk
- (Portugal) Mélanie Florentino
- (Portugal) Rita Melo
- (Portugal) Matilde Nave
- (Portugal) Carolina Simões
- (Republic of Ireland) Hannah O'Brien
- (Republic of Ireland) Kiera Sena
- (Scotland) Laura Berry
- (Serbia) Nevena Kurtes
- (Serbia) Lana Todorović
- (Slovakia) Victoria Havalec
- (Slovakia) Tamara Kramlíková
- (Slovakia) Matilda Sluková
- (Slovenia) Zala Omerza
- (Spain) Paula Comendador
- (Switzerland) Rahel Hinder
- (Turkey) Yaren Ersen
- (Wales) Elena Cole
- (Wales) Charlotte Salisbury-Williams

1 goal

- (Albania) Klesta Ago
- (Albania) Klevisa Ndoci
- (Albania) Xhesika Ndoj
- (Armenia) Isabela Maneh Nersesian
- (Armenia) Marianna Vardanyan
- (Austria) Giulia Bauer
- (Austria) Mia Bertsch
- (Austria) Valentina Illinger
- (Austria) Alina Kerschbaumer
- (Austria) Denise Lueger
- (Belarus) Palina Bareika
- (Belarus) Veranika Kaliuta
- (Belgium) Manon Heremans
- (Bosnia and Herzegovina) Irina Erkić
- (Bosnia and Herzegovina) Natalija Mirković
- (Bulgaria) Andrea Boyadzhieva
- (Bulgaria) Niya Duleva
- (Bulgaria) Gergana Halyanova
- (Bulgaria) Silyana Mihaleva
- (Bulgaria) Teodora Mitova
- (Bulgaria) Mariela Petrova
- (Croatia) Helena Lešić
- (Croatia) Lea Maričić
- (Croatia) Ivona Oto
- (Croatia) Marta Pešut
- (Croatia) Luana Vanjak
- (Croatia) Stela Veseli
- (Czech Republic) Lucie Kroupová
- (Czech Republic) Monika Vojtěchová
- (Denmark) Julie Børkop
- (Denmark) Carli Scheuer Moesgaard
- (Denmark) Frederikke Trolle Thomsen
- (England) Eva Gray
- (England) Laila Harbert
- (Estonia) Anna-Liisa Heide
- (Estonia) Nicole Kelli
- (Estonia) Loviise Männiste
- (Estonia) Elisabeth Ōispuu
- (Estonia) Dajana Smirnova
- (Estonia) Annamarii Tamm
- (Estonia) Ranele Valk
- (Faroe Islands) Eydna Dalheim
- (Finland) Bella Aalto
- (Finland) Veera Jääskä
- (Finland) Lotta Paavilainen
- (Finland) Anike Wusu
- (France) Messina Fouda Ahmadou
- (France) Kentissia Bacoul-Juillard
- (France) Romane Rafalski
- (Georgia (country)) Tako Bulia
- (Georgia (country)) Mariam Mamporia
- (Georgia (country)) Anano Tsikaridze
- (Germany) Julia Schiffarth
- (Greece) Maria Eleni Mougiou
- (Greece) Evangelia Nanou
- (Greece) Ilektra Tzourtzevits
- (Hungary) Julianna Brekovszki
- (Hungary) Dóra Szabó
- (Iceland) Brynja Rán Knudsen
- (Israel) Ayelet Cohen
- (Israel) Shay Elmaleh
- (Israel) Talya Mor
- (Italy) Alessia Guglielmini
- (Italy) Martina Romanelli
- (Kazakhstan) Danagul Akhmetzhan
- (Kazakhstan) Elnura Katran
- (Kosovo) Rita Feka
- (Kosovo) Liza Hoxha
- (Kosovo) Mirjeta Januzi
- (Kosovo) Riga Kallaba
- (Latvia) Alise Baltrušaite
- (Latvia) Paula Dzene
- (Latvia) Ance Meijere
- (Latvia) Samantha Nikola Zālīte
- (Luxembourg) Federica Morvilli
- (Luxembourg) Maylis Cabral Tavares
- (Malta) Francesca Bartolo
- (Malta) Nyorah Celeste
- (Malta) Kaysia Micallef
- (Moldova) Adela Ceban
- (Moldova) Maria Ceban
- (Montenegro) Vladana Boričić
- (Montenegro) Nađa Doknić
- (Montenegro) Amra Lukovic
- (Montenegro) Jelena Nikčević
- (Netherlands) Victoria Boerboom
- (Netherlands) Dechamaily Lont
- (Netherlands) Rosalie Renfurm
- (Netherlands) Fleur Verkooijen
- (North Macedonia) Ana Borizoska
- (North Macedonia) Nikica Trendova
- (Northern Ireland) Mia Moore
- (Norway) Luana Cotrau
- (Norway) Hedda Krogstad Lium
- (Norway) Henry Thorhallsson
- (Norway) Elle Ulstein
- (Poland) Martyna Bartczak
- (Poland) Kinga Wyrwas
- (Poland) Maja Zielińska
- (Portugal) Leticia Sofia Santos Pata Silva
- (Portugal) Joana Valente
- (Portugal) Caetana David Vincente
- (Republic of Ireland) Anna Butler
- (Republic of Ireland) Rebecca Devereux
- (Republic of Ireland) Keelin Dodd
- (Republic of Ireland) Katie Lawlee
- (Republic of Ireland) Sorcha Melia
- (Republic of Ireland) Lucy O'Rourke
- (Republic of Ireland) Amy Tierney
- (Romania) Mara-Miruna Banciu
- (Romania) Brooklyn Eva Menard
- (Romania) Alexia Niculescu
- (Scotland) Cara Gray
- (Scotland) Phoebe Murray
- (Serbia) Tamara Lukić
- (Serbia) Sara Mitić
- (Serbia) Ana Nikolić
- (Serbia) Katarina Popov
- (Serbia) Tijana Popović
- (Slovakia) Terézia Šoltysová
- (Slovenia) Zoja Šrot
- (Slovenia) Ajda Zajc
- (Spain) Amaya García
- (Spain) Lúa Arufe
- (Spain) Silvia Cristóbal
- (Spain) Emma Moreno
- (Spain) Noa Ortega
- (Spain) Emma Moreno Torres
- (Sweden) Isabelle Axelsson
- (Sweden) Fabienne Bartholdson
- (Sweden) Nova Rolfsson
- (Sweden) Moa Svensson
- (Switzerland) Lia Ammann
- (Switzerland) Giorgia Bianchi
- (Switzerland) Nayana Ebersold
- (Switzerland) Alyssa Keller
- (Switzerland) Giulia Looser
- (Turkey) Ecemnur Öztürk
- (Turkey) Berra Pekgöz
- (Turkey) Ela Yetim
- (Ukraine) Viktoriia Savkina
- (Wales) Ffion Bowen
- (Wales) Teagan Scarlett

1 own goal

- (Andorra) Júlia Rodriguez Falco (against Serbia)
- (Armenia) Susanna Sahakyan (against North Macedonia)
- (Austria) Victoria Glabonjat (against Belgium)
- (Azerbaijan) Ayshan Salamzada (against Bulgaria)
- (Croatia) Mia Pestić (against Austria)
- (Hungary) Gréta Bánfi (against England)
- (Iceland) Helga Rut Einarsdóttir (against Poland)
- (Israel) Shira Carmeli (against Ireland)
- (Malta) Aisha Micallef (against Croatia)
- (Northern Ireland) Gracie Conway (against Hungary)
- (North Macedonia) Mihaela Dodevska (against Poland)
- (Norway) Tuva Olaussen Sagen (against Iceland)
- (Romania) Rianna Frătuțescu (against Austria)
- (Romania) Anastasia Lionte (against Germany)

Source: UEFA
