= 2023 UEFA Women's Under-17 Championship qualification =

Tournament details
- Dates: Round 1: 22 September – 15 November 2022; Round 2: 8 – 30 March 2023
- Teams: 48 (from 1 confederation)

Tournament statistics
- Matches played: 130
- Goals scored: 421 (3.24 per match)
- Top scorer(s): (Montenegro) Maša Tomašević (9 goals)

The 2023 UEFA Women's Under-17 Championship qualifying competition was a women's under-17 football competition that determined the seven teams joining the automatically qualified hosts Estonia in the 2023 UEFA Women's Under-17 Championship final tournament.

48 teams, including hosts Estonia, entered the qualifying competition. Players born on or after 1 January 2006 are eligible to participate.

== Format ==
Last season, UEFA implemented a new format for the women's U17 and U19 Euros, based on a league-style qualifying format.

The teams are divided in two leagues: League A (28 teams) and League B (20 teams).

Each league will play two rounds:

- Round 1: In each league, groups of 4 teams will play mini-tournaments. The winners of each mini-tournament in league B and the best runner-up will be promoted and the last-placed teams in league A mini-tournaments will be relegated.
- Round 2: The seven winners of League A will qualify for the final tournament. The six winners of mini-tournaments in league B and the best runner-up will be promoted and the last-placed teams in league A will be relegated for Round 1 of the next edition of the tournament.

=== Tiebreakers ===
In Round 1 and Round 2, teams are ranked according to points (3 points for a win, 1 point for a draw, 0 points for a loss), and if tied on points, the following tiebreaking criteria are applied, in the order given, to determine the rankings (Regulations Articles 17.01 and 17.02):

1. Points in head-to-head matches among tied teams;
2. Goal difference in head-to-head matches among tied teams;
3. Goals scored in head-to-head matches among tied teams;
4. If more than two teams are tied, and after applying all head-to-head criteria above, a subset of teams are still tied, all head-to-head criteria above are reapplied exclusively to this subset of teams;
5. Goal difference in all group matches;
6. Goals scored in all group matches;
7. Penalty shoot-out if only two teams have the same number of points, and they met in the last round of the group and are tied after applying all criteria above (not used if more than two teams have the same number of points, or if their rankings are not relevant for qualification for the next stage);
8. Disciplinary points (red card = 3 points, yellow card = 1 point, expulsion for two yellow cards in one match = 3 points);
9. Position in the applicable ranking:
  1. for teams in round 1, position in 2021–22 round 2 league rankings;
  2. for teams in round 2, position in the round 1 league ranking.

To determine the five best third-placed teams from the qualifying round, the results against the teams in fourth place are discarded. The following criteria are applied (Regulations Article 15.01):

1. Points;
2. Goal difference;
3. Goals scored;
4. Disciplinary points;
5. Position in the applicable ranking:
  1. for teams in round 1, position in the coefficient rankings;
  2. for teams in round 2, position in the round 1 league ranking.

== Round 1 ==
=== Draw ===
The draw for the qualifying round was held on 31 May 2022, at the UEFA headquarters in Nyon, Switzerland.

The teams were seeded according to their final group standings of the 2021–22 competition (Regulations Article 13.01).

Each group contained one team from Pot A, one team from Pot B, one team from Pot C, and one team from Pot D. For political reasons, Armenia and Azerbaijan would not be drawn in the same group.

To determine the 2021–22 Round 2 league rankings, the following criteria was followed:

1. higher position in the following classification:
  1. League A Round 2 group winners
  2. League A Round 2 group runners-up
  3. League A Round 2 third-placed teams
  4. Teams promoted from League B
  5. Teams relegated from League A
  6. League B Round 2 runners-up
  7. League B Round 2 third-placed teams
  8. League B Round 2 fourth-placed teams
2. higher number of points in all mini-tournament matches;
3. superior goal difference in all mini-tournament matches;
4. higher number of goals scored in all mini-tournament matches;
5. lower disciplinary points (red card = 3 points, yellow card = 1 point, expulsion for two yellow cards in one match = 3 points);
6. higher position in the 2021–22 round 1 league rankings.

Teams entering League A

Pot 1
Team	Pos.	Pts.	GD	GS
Spain	1 (A)	3	6	6
Netherlands	1 (A)	3	3	3
Germany TH	1 (A)	3	1	3
France	1 (A)	3	1	2
Denmark	1 (A)	3	1	1
Finland	1 (A)	1	0	1
Norway	1 (A)	0	–1	2

Pot 2
Team	Pos.	Pts.	GD	GS
Serbia	2 (A)	3	1	3
Iceland	2 (A)	1	0	1
Austria	2 (A)	0	–1	2
England	2 (A)	0	–1	1
Greece	2 (A)	0	–1	0
Portugal	2 (A)	0	–3	0
Hungary	2 (A)	0	–6	0

Pot 3
Team	Pos.	Pts.	GD	GS
Sweden	3 (A)	3	–1	2
Italy	3 (A)	0	–3	2
Republic of Ireland	3 (A)	0	–4	2
Slovenia	3 (A)	0	–5	1
Czech Republic	3 (A)	0	–5	0
Poland	3 (A)	0	–6	1
Ukraine	4 (A)			

Pot 4
Team	Pos.	Pts.	GD	GS	DP
Scotland	1 (B)	6	15	15	0
Switzerland	1 (B)	6	15	15	1
Turkey	1 (B)	6	8	9	1
Belgium	1 (B)	6	8	9	2
Estonia	1 (B)	6	4	9	
Northern Ireland	1 (B)	6	3	4	
Bosnia and Herzegovina	2 (B)	3	4	6	

Teams entering League B

Pot 1
Team	Pos.	Pts.	GD	GS
Slovakia	4 (A)	1	–5	1
Kosovo	4 (A)	0	–12	1
Croatia	4 (A)	0	–18	0
Romania	4 (A)	0	–24	1
Montenegro	4 (A)	0	–29	1
Belarus	4 (A)			

Pot 2
Team	Pos.	Pts.	GD	GS
Lithuania	2 (B)	3	2	7
Israel	2 (B)	3	2	5
Bulgaria	2 (B)	3	0	4
Latvia	2 (B)	3	–2	3
Albania	2 (B)	3	–4	4
Georgia	3 (B)	0	–4	2

Pot 3
Team	Pos.	Pts.	GD	GS
Luxembourg	3 (B)	0	–5	2
Armenia	3 (B)	0	–6	0
North Macedonia	3 (B)	0	–11	2
Moldova	3 (B)	0	–12	0
Kazakhstan	3 (B)	0	–17	2
Faroe Islands	4 (B)	1	–5	0
Azerbaijan	4 (B)	0	–10	0
Wales	4 (B)			

=== League A ===
Hosts will be appointed for each mini-tournament. All the matches will be played between 1 August and 20 November 2022.

==== Group A1 ====
Pos	Team	Pld	W	D	L	GF	GA	GD	Pts	Promotion
1	Czech Republic	3	2	0	1	3	2	+1	6 (Note: Head-to-head result: Norway 1–2 Czech Republic.)	Transfer to Round 2 (League A)
2	Norway	3	2	0	1	5	2	+3	6	Transfer to Round 2 (League A)
3	Hungary (H)	3	1	1	1	1	1	0	4	Transfer to Round 2 (League A)
4	Bosnia and Herzegovina	3	0	1	2	0	4	−4	1	Relegated to Round 2 (League B)

Source: UEFA
Rules for classification: Qualification tiebreakers
(H) Hosts
Notes:
19 October 2022
14:00

Norway	3–0	Bosnia and Herzegovina
Svendheim 52', 90+1'; Strømnes 56'	Report

Grosics Stadion, Tatabánya
Attendance: 20
Referee: Cansu Tiryaki (Turkey)
19 October 2022
17:00

Czech Republic	0–1	Hungary
	Report	Szarvas 56'

Globall Football Park, Telki
Attendance: 70
Referee: Kateryna Usova (Ukraine)

22 October 2022
13:45

Norway	1–2	Czech Republic
Fenger 23'	Report	Jančářová 74'; Vojáčková 90+4'

Globall Football Park, Telki
Attendance: 40
Referee: Zoe Stavrou (Cyprus)
22 October 2022
17:00

Hungary	0–0	Bosnia and Herzegovina
	Report

Globall Football Park, Telki
Attendance: 130
Referee: Kateryna Usova (Ukraine)

25 October 2022
18:15

Hungary	0–1	Norway
	Report	Hjelmhaug 76'

Globall Football Park, Telki
Attendance: 90
Referee: Zoe Stavrou (Cyprus)
25 October 2022
18:15

Bosnia and Herzegovina	0–1	Czech Republic
	Report	Svobodová 23'

Grosics Stadion, Tatabánya
Attendance: 20
Referee: Cansu Tiryaki (Turkey)

==== Group A2 ====
Pos	Team	Pld	W	D	L	GF	GA	GD	Pts	Promotion
1	Spain (H)	3	3	0	0	12	0	+12	9	Transfer to Round 2 (League A)
2	Poland	3	2	0	1	4	3	+1	6	Transfer to Round 2 (League A)
3	Belgium	3	1	0	2	1	5	−4	3	Transfer to Round 2 (League A)
4	Greece	3	0	0	3	0	9	−9	0	Relegated to Round 2 (League B)

Source: UEFA
Rules for classification: Qualification tiebreakers
(H) Hosts
22 September 2022
13:30

Poland	3–0	Greece
Grzywińska 31'; Guzik 45+1'; Sikora 82'	Report

Estadi Olímpic Camilo Cano, La Nucia
Attendance: 51
Referee: Emanuela Rusta (Albania)
22 September 2022
21:00

Spain	4–0	Belgium
Redondo 15', 32'; Cubo Barroso 40'; Segura 86'	Report

Estadi Olímpic Camilo Cano, La Nucia
Attendance: 115
Referee: Martina Molinaro (Italia)

25 September 2022
11:30

Greece	0–1	Belgium
	Report	Pirenne 70'

Estadio Polideportivo Municipal Pau Gasol, L'Alfàs del Pi
Attendance: 32
Referee: Emanuela Rusta (Albania)
25 September 2022
18:00

Spain	3–0	Poland
Redondo 2'; López 9'; Arques 67'	Report

Estadio Polideportivo Municipal Pau Gasol, L'Alfàs del Pi
Attendance: 153
Referee: Minka Vekkeli (Finland)

28 September 2022
10:30

Belgium	0–1	Poland
	Report	Półrolniczak 45+6'

Estadio Polideportivo Municipal Pau Gasol, L'Alfàs del Pi
Attendance: 10
Referee: Martina Molinaro (Italia)
28 September 2022
18:00

Greece	0–5	Spain
	Report	Ortega Requena 41', 71'; Zagkli 43' (o.g.), 73' (o.g.); Segura 58'

Estadi Olímpic Camilo Cano, La Nucia
Attendance: 312
Referee: Minka Vekkeli (Finland)

==== Group A3 ====
Pos	Team	Pld	W	D	L	GF	GA	GD	Pts	Promotion
1	Republic of Ireland	3	2	0	1	4	3	+1	6 (Note: Head-to-head results: Republic of Ireland 0–1 Austria, Finland 2–3 Republic of Ireland, Austria 0–1 Finland. Head-to-head standings: Republic of Ireland: 3 pts, 0 GD (3 GF, 3 GA), Republic of Ireland won against Finland; Finland: 3 pts, 0 GD (3 GF, 3 GA), Finland lost against Republic of Ireland; Austria: 3 pts, 0 GD (1 GF, 1 GA))	Transfer to Round 2 (League A)
2	Finland	3	2	0	1	5	3	+2	6	Transfer to Round 2 (League A)
3	Austria	3	2	0	1	4	1	+3	6	Transfer to Round 2 (League A)
4	Northern Ireland (H)	3	0	0	3	0	6	−6	0	Relegated to Round 2 (League B)

Source: UEFA
Rules for classification: Qualification tiebreakers
(H) Hosts
Notes:
21 October 2022
15:00 (14:00 BST)

Republic of Ireland	0–1	Austria
	Report	Gutmann 58'

Seaview, Belfast
Attendance: 40
Referee: Jelena Kumer (Croatia)
21 October 2022
20:00 (19:00 BST)

Finland	2–0	Northern Ireland
Sarelius 50', 52'	Report

Seaview, Belfast
Attendance: 525
Referee: Deborah Anex (Switzerland)

24 October 2022
13:00 (12:00 BST)

Finland	2–3	Republic of Ireland
Hassinen 34'; Kiviranta 82' (pen.)	Report	Kelly 10'; Gallagher 28'; Loughrey 37'

Seaview, Belfast
Attendance: 75
Referee: Silvia Gasperotti (Italy)
24 October 2022
15:00 (14:00 BST)

Austria	3–0	Northern Ireland
Höcherl 50'; Gutmann 67'; Krassnig 84'	Report

Solitude, Belfast
Attendance: 72
Referee: Deborah Anex (Switzerland)

27 October 2022
15:00 (14:00 BST)

Austria	0–1	Finland
	Report	Lahikainen 36'

Solitude, Belfast
Attendance: 25
Referee: Silvia Gasperotti (Italy)
27 October 2022
15:00 (14:00 BST)

Northern Ireland	0–1	Republic of Ireland
	Report	McNeill 18' (o.g.)

Seaview, Belfast
Attendance: 352
Referee: Jelena Kumer (Croatia)

==== Group A4 ====
Pos	Team	Pld	W	D	L	GF	GA	GD	Pts	Promotion
1	Switzerland	3	3	0	0	7	3	+4	9	Transfer to Round 2 (League A)
2	France	3	2	0	1	11	8	+3	6	Transfer to Round 2 (League A)
3	Italy (H)	3	0	1	2	6	9	−3	1	Transfer to Round 2 (League A)
4	Iceland	3	0	1	2	8	12	−4	1	Relegated to Round 2 (League B)

Source: UEFA
Rules for classification: Qualification tiebreakers
(H) Hosts
4 October 2022
12:00

France	1–2	Switzerland
Policnik 40'	Report	Egli 30'; Arnold 82'

Stadio Germano Todoli, Cervia
Attendance: 40
Referee: Anastasia Mylopoulou (Greece)
4 October 2022
15:00

Italy	3–3	Iceland
Dragoni 33'; Girotto 44', 70'	Report	Óskarsdóttir 40'; Egilsdóttir 82'; Halldórsdóttir 83'

Stadio Comunale Giuseppe Capanni, Savignano sul Rubicone
Attendance: 350
Referee: Sofik Torosyan (Armenia)

7 October 2022
12:00

Iceland	1–3	Switzerland
Óskarsdóttir 45+1' (pen.)	Report	Schertenleib 7', 63'; Wandeler 49'

Stadio Valentino Mazzola, Santarcangelo di Romagna
Attendance: 52
Referee: Sofik Torosyan (Armenia)
7 October 2022
16:00

France	4–2	Italy
Ben Khaled 2'; Mendy 34' (pen.); Policnik 45+1'; Ebayilin 52'	Report	Pellegrino Cimò 49'; Razza 90+3'

Stadio Tullo Morgagni, Forlì
Attendance: 203
Referee: Frederikke Lydia Søkjær (Denmark)

10 October 2022
15:00

Iceland	4–6	France
Tryggvadóttir 27', 32', 37'; Helgadóttir 88'	Report	Mendy 12'; Ebayilin 45+2', 55', 57'; Camara 60'; Joseph 69'

Stadio Valentino Mazzola, Santarcangelo di Romagna
Attendance: 48
Referee: Frederikke Lydia Søkjær (Denmark)
10 October 2022
15:00

Switzerland	2–1	Italy
Stoob 20'; Egli 39'	Report	Pellegrino Cimò 56'

Stadio Tullo Morgagni, Forlì
Attendance: 145
Referee: Anastasia Mylopoulou (Greece)

==== Group A5 ====
Pos	Team	Pld	W	D	L	GF	GA	GD	Pts	Promotion
1	Germany	3	3	0	0	13	3	+10	9	Transfer to Round 2 (League A)
2	Slovenia (H)	3	1	1	1	4	2	+2	4	Transfer to Round 2 (League A)
3	Serbia	3	1	1	1	4	3	+1	4	Transfer to Round 2 (League A)
4	Turkey	3	0	0	3	2	15	−13	0	Relegated to Round 2 (League B)

Source: UEFA
Rules for classification: Qualification tiebreakers
(H) Hosts
19 October 2022
16:00

Germany	9–1	Turkey
Yiğit 5' (o.g.); Wileschek 8'; Sahiti 22'; Schetter 47'; Walheim 51', 73'; Merino Gonzalez 58'; Schneider 71'; Milz 90+6'	Report	Şentürk 41'

Matija Gubec Stadium, Krško
Attendance: 20
Referee: Oxana Cruc (Moldova)
19 October 2022
16:00

Slovenia	0–0	Serbia
	Report

Igrišče Terme Čatež, Čatež ob Savi
Attendance: 90
Referee: Alexandra Collin (France)

22 October 2022
16:00

Germany	2–1	Slovenia
Walheim 56'; Preuß 90+1'	Report	Testen 60'

Matija Gubec Stadium, Krško
Attendance: 637
Referee: Teresa Oliveira (Portugal)
22 October 2022
16:00

Serbia	3–1	Turkey
Uvalin 30'; Marković 40'; Vasić 70'	Report	Şentürk 15'

Igrišče Terme Čatež, Čatež ob Savi
Attendance: 75
Referee: Alexandra Collin (France)

25 October 2022
14:30

Serbia	1–2	Germany
Vasić 31'	Report	Merino Gonzalez 56'; Bünning 79'

Matija Gubec Stadium, Krško
Attendance: 30
Referee: Teresa Oliveira (Portugal)
25 October 2022
14:30

Turkey	0–3	Slovenia
	Report	Kramžar 9'; Omerza 46'; Testen 66'

Igrišče Terme Čatež, Čatež ob Savi
Attendance: 81
Referee: Oxana Cruc (Moldova)

==== Group A6 ====
Pos	Team	Pld	W	D	L	GF	GA	GD	Pts	Promotion
1	England	3	3	0	0	17	1	+16	9	Transfer to Round 2 (League A)
2	Denmark	3	2	0	1	12	4	+8	6	Transfer to Round 2 (League A)
3	Estonia (H)	3	0	1	2	0	10	−10	1	Transfer to Round 2 (League A)
4	Ukraine	3	0	1	2	1	15	−14	1	Relegated to Round 2 (League B)

Source: UEFA
Rules for classification: Qualification tiebreakers
(H) Hosts
7 October 2022
13:30

Ukraine	0–11	England
	Report	Baker 21', 28' (pen.), 45+1', 55'; Potter 29', 50'; Harbert 32'; Agyemang 33'; Earl 67', 71'; Lia 90+2'

Kadriorg Stadium, Tallinn
Attendance: 44
Referee: Merima Čelik (Bosnia and Herzegovina)
7 October 2022
17:00

Denmark	7–0	Estonia
Kaihøj 16'; Aagaard 37'; Nielsen 54'; Saini 63', 78'; Holt 83'; Lerche 90+3'	Report

Lilleküla Stadium, Tallinn
Attendance: 109
Referee: Gamze Durmuş (Turkey)

10 October 2022
13:30

Denmark	4–1	Ukraine
Antvorskov 15', 43'; Byrnak 45+1'; Nielsen 74'	Report	Astakhova 58'

Kadriorg Stadium, Tallinn
Attendance: 20
Referee: Ana Maria Alexandra Terteleac (Romania)
10 October 2022
17:00

England	3–0	Estonia
Baker 44'; Brown 89'; Earl 90+1'	Report

Lilleküla Stadium, Tallinn
Attendance: 144
Referee: Merima Čelik (Bosnia and Herzegovina)

13 October 2022
13:30

Estonia	0–0	Ukraine
	Report

Lilleküla Stadium, Tallinn
Attendance: 90
Referee: Gamze Durmuş (Turkey)
13 October 2022
13:30

England	3–1	Denmark
Earl 8'; Agyemang 18'; Baker 90+2'	Report	Aagaard 81'

Kadriorg Stadium, Tallinn
Attendance: 25
Referee: Ana Maria Alexandra Terteleac (Romania)

==== Group A7 ====
Pos	Team	Pld	W	D	L	GF	GA	GD	Pts	Promotion
1	Netherlands	3	3	0	0	11	2	+9	9	Transfer to Round 2 (League A)
2	Portugal (H)	3	2	0	1	3	3	0	6	Transfer to Round 2 (League A)
3	Sweden	3	1	0	2	4	7	−3	3	Transfer to Round 2 (League A)
4	Scotland	3	0	0	3	3	9	−6	0	Relegated to Round 2 (League B)

Source: UEFA
Rules for classification: Qualification tiebreakers
(H) Hosts
19 October 2022
16:00 (15:00 WEST)

Sweden	0–1	Portugal
	Report	Correia 44'

Campo da Mata, Caldas da Rainha
Attendance: 150
Referee: Ioanna Allayiotou (Cyprus)
19 October 2022
18:00 (17:00 WEST)

Netherlands	4–1	Scotland
Weiman 54'; Janssen 76', 90+4'; McArthur 90+1' (o.g.)	Report	Clark 66'

Estádio Municipal da Marinha Grande, Marinha Grande
Attendance: 72
Referee: Deborah Bianchi (Italy)

22 October 2022
16:00 (15:00 WEST)

Portugal	2–1	Scotland
Gago 66'; Correia 90+1'	Report	Berry 76'

Campo da Mata, Caldas da Rainha
Attendance: 186
Referee: Ioanna Allayiotou (Cyprus)
22 October 2022
18:00 (17:00 WEST)

Netherlands	5–1	Sweden
Björklund 9' (o.g.); Janssen 24'; van Hensbergen 26', 63'; Iedema 78'	Report	Björnberg 90+3'

Estádio Dr. Magalhães Pessoa, Leiria
Attendance: 73
Referee: Olatz Rivera Olmedo (Spain)

25 October 2022
16:00 (15:00 WEST)

Portugal	0–2	Netherlands
	Report	van Egmond 40'; Janssen 55'

Estádio Dr. Magalhães Pessoa, Leiria
Attendance: 160
Referee: Olatz Rivera Olmedo (Spain)
25 October 2022
16:00 (15:00 WEST)

Scotland	1–3	Sweden
McAuley 17'	Report	Gray 46' (o.g.); Sjödahl 68'; Pelgander 90'

Estádio Municipal da Marinha Grande, Marinha Grande
Attendance: 82
Referee: Deborah Bianchi (Italy)

=== League B ===
==== Group B1 ====
Pos	Team	Pld	W	D	L	GF	GA	GD	Pts	Promotion
1	Belarus	3	3	0	0	18	0	+18	9	Promotion to Round 2 (League A)
2	Luxembourg (H)	3	2	0	1	4	3	+1	6	Transfer to Round 2 (League B)
3	Armenia	3	1	0	2	3	7	−4	3	Transfer to Round 2 (League B)
4	Georgia	3	0	0	3	0	15	−15	0	Transfer to Round 2 (League B)

Source: UEFA
Rules for classification: Qualification tiebreakers
(H) Hosts
4 October 2022
17:00

Belarus	6–0	Armenia
Kavaliova 4', 84'; Karabanko 18' (pen.); Kalinouskaya 61'; Yatsynovich 81'; Belavus 84'	Report

Stade John Grün, Mondorf-les-Bains
Attendance: 50
Referee: Triinu Laos (Estonia)
4 October 2022
19:00

Luxembourg	3–0	Georgia
Schmit 66', 69', 89'	Report

Terrain Bousbierg stadium, Bissen
Attendance: 176
Referee: Olivia Tschon (Austria)

7 October 2022
17:00

Belarus	3–0	Luxembourg
Yatsynovich 5'; Kavaliova 40', 90+4'	Report

Stade John Grün, Mondorf-les-Bains
Attendance: 257
Referee: Irena Velevačkoska (North Macedonia)
7 October 2022
19:00

Georgia	0–3	Armenia
	Report	Nersesian 19' (pen.), 24'; Vardanyan 52'

Stade Alphonse Theis, Hesperange
Attendance: 100
Referee: Olivia Tschon (Austria)

10 October 2022
19:00

Georgia	0–9	Belarus
	Report	Siniauskaya 4', 61', 66', 73'; Kavaliova 32', 45'; Rabrova 75'; Maher 79'; Karachun 82'

Bousbierg stadium, Bissen
Attendance: 25
Referee: Irena Velevačkoska (North Macedonia)
10 October 2022
19:00

Armenia	0–1	Luxembourg
	Report	Alves 4'

Stade Alphonse Theis, Hesperange
Attendance: 451
Referee: Triinu Laos (Estonia)

==== Group B2 ====
Pos	Team	Pld	W	D	L	GF	GA	GD	Pts	Promotion
1	North Macedonia	3	3	0	0	9	3	+6	9	Promotion to Round 2 (League A)
2	Kosovo	3	2	0	1	16	2	+14	6	Promotion to Round 2 (League A)
3	Albania (H)	3	1	0	2	11	12	−1	3	Transfer to Round 2 (League B)
4	Moldova	3	0	0	3	1	20	−19	0	Transfer to Round 2 (League B)

Source: UEFA
Rules for classification: Qualification tiebreakers
(H) Hosts
18 October 2022
12:00

Kosovo	9–0	Moldova
Shabani 2', 17', 22', 78'; Feka 15'; Bela 28', 53'; Paci 70'; Mulliqi 74'	Report

Arena Egnatia, Rrogozhinë
Attendance: 15
Referee: Jelena Jermolajeva (Latvia)
18 October 2022
14:30

North Macedonia	5–2	Albania
Mitkovska 13'; Gjorgjieva 45+3'; J. Pavlovska 52', 72'; Vasileva 87'	Report	Methoxha 33'; Ago 34'

Elbasan Arena, Elbasan
Attendance: 100
Referee: Louise Thompson (Northern Ireland)

21 October 2022
12:00

Kosovo	1–2	North Macedonia
Paci 7'	Report	Mitkovska 35', 45+1'

Arena Egnatia, Rrogozhinë
Attendance: 50
Referee: Tatyana Sorokopudova (Kazakhstan)
21 October 2022
14:30

Albania	9–1	Moldova
Vasa 10', 45+3', 77'; Ago 11', 58', 64'; Ndoj 20'; Methoxha 71'; Brahaj 81'	Report	Nichifor 18'

Elbasan Arena, Elbasan
Attendance: 25
Referee: Louise Thompson (Northern Ireland)

24 October 2022
14:30

Albania	0–6	Kosovo
	Report	Paci 6', 54'; Shabani 10', 44'; Feka 49'; Ndoci 75' (o.g.)

Elbasan Arena, Elbasan
Attendance: 75
Referee: Tatyana Sorokopudova (Kazakhstan)
24 October 2022
14:30

Moldova	0–2	North Macedonia
	Report	Ibraimi 79'; Ilievska 82'

Arena Egnatia, Rrogozhinë
Attendance: 20
Referee: Jelena Jermolajeva (Latvia)

==== Group B3 ====
Pos	Team	Pld	W	D	L	GF	GA	GD	Pts	Promotion
1	Croatia	2	2	0	0	6	0	+6	6	Promotion to Round 2 (League A)
2	Faroe Islands	2	0	1	1	0	1	−1	1	Transfer to Round 2 (League B)
3	Bulgaria (H)	2	0	1	1	0	5	−5	1	Transfer to Round 2 (League B)

Source: UEFA
Rules for classification: Qualification tiebreakers
(H) Hosts
9 November 2022
13:30

Bulgaria	0–5	Croatia
	Report	Veseli 6'; Vračević 51'; Petković 55'; Lovrić 76' (pen.); Vunić 90+4' (pen.)

Albena 1 Stadium, Albena
Attendance: 57
Referee: Emanuela Rusta (Albania)

12 November 2022
13:30

Croatia	1–0	Faroe Islands
Lovrić 78'	Report

Albena 1 Stadium, Albena
Attendance: 49
Referee: Tanja Račić (Bosnia and Herzegovina)

15 November 2022
13:30

Faroe Islands	0–0	Bulgaria
	Report

Albena 1 Stadium, Albena
Attendance: 78
Referee: Deborah Bianchi (Italy)

==== Group B4 ====
Pos	Team	Pld	W	D	L	GF	GA	GD	Pts	Promotion
1	Slovakia	2	2	0	0	11	0	+11	6	Promotion to Round 2 (League A)
2	Latvia (H)	2	1	0	1	4	6	−2	3	Transfer to Round 2 (League B)
3	Azerbaijan	2	0	0	2	0	9	−9	0	Transfer to Round 2 (League B)

Source: UEFA
Rules for classification: Qualification tiebreakers
(H) Hosts
23 October 2022
18:00 (19:00 EEST)

Latvia	4–0	Azerbaijan
Sīpola 26', 35', 54'; Belova 59' (pen.)	Report

Salaspils BSS stadium, Salaspils
Attendance: 166
Referee: Lovisa Johansson (Sweden)

26 October 2022
12:00 (13:00 EEST)

Azerbaijan	0–5	Slovakia
	Report	Bučková 21'; Pajunková 42'; Gondová 46'; Straková 56'; Kramlíková 90'

Salaspils BSS stadium, Salaspils
Attendance: 21
Referee: Anastasiya Romanyuk (Ukraine)

29 October 2022
18:30 (19:30 EEST)

Slovakia	6–0	Latvia
Horváthová 10'; Sluková 20', 40', 82'; Martišková 24', 28'	Report

Salaspils BSS stadium, Salaspils
Attendance: 182
Referee: Emilie Torkelsen (Norway)

==== Group B5 ====
Pos	Team	Pld	W	D	L	GF	GA	GD	Pts	Promotion
1	Wales	2	2	0	0	8	0	+8	6	Promotion to Round 2 (League A)
2	Israel (H)	2	1	0	1	4	5	−1	3	Transfer to Round 2 (League B)
3	Montenegro	2	0	0	2	1	8	−7	0	Transfer to Round 2 (League B)

Source: UEFA
Rules for classification: Qualification tiebreakers
(H) Hosts
27 October 2022
14:00 (15:00 IDT)

Israel	4–1	Montenegro
Biru 17'; Moscovici 44'; Workou 45+3', 80'	Report	Čađenović 82'

National team complex, Shefayim
Attendance: 52
Referee: Viki de Cremer (Belgium)

30 October 2022
10:30 (11:30 IDT)

Montenegro	0–4	Wales
	Report	Cole 14' (pen.); Denham 77'; McMahon 82'; Perrott 86'

National team complex, Shefayim
Attendance: 32
Referee: Fabienne Michel (Germany)

2 November 2022
14:00 (15:00 IDT)

Wales	4–0	Israel
Cole 4', 17', 68'; Francis 46'	Report

National team complex, Shefayim
Attendance: 73
Referee: Jurgita Mačikunytė (Lithuania)

==== Group B6 ====
Pos	Team	Pld	W	D	L	GF	GA	GD	Pts	Promotion
1	Romania (H)	2	1	0	1	3	2	+1	3	Promotion to Round 2 (League A)
2	Kazakhstan	2	1	0	1	2	2	0	3	Transfer to Round 2 (League B)
3	Lithuania	2	1	0	1	1	2	−1	3	Transfer to Round 2 (League B)

Source: UEFA
Rules for classification: Qualification tiebreakers
(H) Hosts
5 October 2022
17:00

Romania	2–0	Lithuania
Szoke 30'; Filip 69'	Report

Football Centre FRF, Buftea
Attendance: 30
Referee: Caroline Lanssens (Belgium)

8 October 2022
17:00

Lithuania	1–0	Kazakhstan
Penkauskaitė 62'	Report

Football Centre FRF, Buftea
Attendance: 14
Referee: Zulema González González (Spain)

11 October 2022
17:00

Kazakhstan	2–1	Romania
Kozhabekova 21'; Orynbay 44'	Report	Dincă-Vuia 57'

Football Centre FRF, Buftea
Attendance: 20
Referee: Andromachi Tsiofliki (Greece)

==== Ranking of second-placed teams ====
To determine the best runner-up, only the results of the runner-up teams against the first and third-placed teams in their group are taken into account.

Pos	Grp	Team	Pld	W	D	L	GF	GA	GD	Pts	Qualification
1	B2	Kosovo	2	1	0	1	7	2	+5	3	Promotion to Round 2 (League A)
2	B6	Kazakhstan	2	1	0	1	2	2	0	3	
3	B5	Israel	2	1	0	1	4	5	−1	3	
4	B4	Latvia	2	1	0	1	4	6	−2	3	
5	B1	Luxembourg	2	1	0	1	1	3	−2	3	
6	B3	Faroe Islands	2	0	1	1	0	1	−1	1	

Source: UEFA
Rules for classification: 1) points; 2) goal difference; 3) goals scored; 4) disciplinary points; 5) coefficient ranking.

== Round 2 ==
=== Draw ===
The 21 teams of Round 1 League A and the 7 teams of Round 2 League B (six group winners and the best runner-up) are drawn in seven groups of four teams.

The teams were seeded according to their results in the round 1 (Regulations Article 15.01).

Teams entering League A

Pos	Grp	Team	Pld	W	D	L	GF	GA	GD	Pts	Seeding
1	A6	England	3	3	0	0	17	1	+16	9	Pot A
2	A2	Spain	3	3	0	0	12	0	+12	9	Pot A
3	A5	Germany	3	3	0	0	13	3	+10	9	Pot A
4	A7	Netherlands	3	3	0	0	11	2	+9	9	Pot A
5	A4	Switzerland	3	3	0	0	7	3	+4	9	Pot A
6	A3	Republic of Ireland	3	2	0	1	4	3	+1	6	Pot A
7	A1	Czech Republic	3	2	0	1	3	2	+1	6	Pot A
8	A6	Denmark	3	2	0	1	12	4	+8	6	Pot B
9	A4	France	3	2	0	1	11	8	+3	6	Pot B
10	A1	Norway	3	2	0	1	5	2	+3	6	Pot B
11	A3	Finland	3	2	0	1	5	3	+2	6	Pot B
12	A2	Poland	3	2	0	1	4	3	+1	6	Pot B
13	A7	Portugal	3	2	0	1	3	3	0	6	Pot B
14	A5	Slovenia	3	1	1	1	4	2	+2	4	Pot B
15	A3	Austria	3	2	0	1	4	1	+3	6	Pot C
16	A5	Serbia	3	1	1	1	4	3	+1	4	Pot C
17	A1	Hungary	3	1	1	1	1	1	0	4	Pot C
18	A7	Sweden	3	1	0	2	4	7	−3	3	Pot C
19	A2	Belgium	3	1	0	2	1	5	−4	3	Pot C
20	A4	Italy	3	0	1	2	6	9	−3	1	Pot C
21	A6	Estonia	3	0	1	2	0	10	−10	1	Pot C
22	B4	Slovakia	2	2	0	0	11	0	+11	6	Pot D
23	B1	Belarus	2	2	0	0	9	0	+9	6	Pot D
24	B5	Wales	2	2	0	0	8	0	+8	6	Pot D
25	B3	Croatia	2	2	0	0	6	0	+6	6	Pot D
26	B2	North Macedonia	2	2	0	0	7	3	+4	6	Pot D
27	B2	Kosovo	2	1	0	1	7	2	+5	3	Pot D
28	B6	Romania	2	1	0	1	3	2	+1	3	Pot D

Source: UEFA
Rules for classification: 1) round 1 position; 2) points; 3) goal difference; 4) goals scored; 5) disciplinary points; 6) coefficient.

=== League A ===
Times are CET/CEST, (Note: CET (UTC+1) for dates up to 26 March 2023, and CEST (UTC+2) for dates thereafter.) as listed by UEFA (local times, if different, are in parentheses).

==== Group A1 ====
Pos	Team	Pld	W	D	L	GF	GA	GD	Pts	Promotion
1	Poland	3	2	1	0	6	3	+3	7	Qualified for the final tournament
2	Romania (H)	3	2	0	1	6	5	+1	6	
3	Czech Republic	3	1	1	1	7	3	+4	4	
4	Estonia	3	0	0	3	3	11	−8	0	Relegated to League B for the next tournament qualification

Source: UEFA
Rules for classification: Qualification tiebreakers
(H) Hosts
8 March 2023
10:00 (11:00 EET)

Estonia	0–2	Poland
	Report	Gliszczyńska 18', 45+2'

Football Centre FRF, Buftea
Referee: Audrey Gerbel (France)
8 March 2023
15:00 (16:00 EET)

Czech Republic	0–1	Romania
	Report	Stancu 32'

Football Centre FRF, Buftea
Referee: Lotta Vuorio (Finland)

11 March 2023
10:00 (11:00 EET)

Czech Republic	5–0	Estonia
Krejčová 14'; Jakubů 35'; Kroupova 39'; Vithova 53' (pen.), 84'	Report

Football Centre FRF, Buftea
Referee: Oxana Cruc (Moldova)
11 March 2023
15:00 (16:00 EET)

Poland	2–1	Romania
Polrolniczak 64' (pen.); Grzywinska 82'	Report	Stancu 33'

Football Centre FRF, Buftea
Referee: Audrey Gerbel (France)

14 March 2023
15:00 (16:00 EET)

Romania	4–3	Estonia
Boboc 11'; Mihaescu 43', 57'; Stancu 67'	Report	Orlova 63' (pen.); Õispuu 79'; Mirjam 82'

Football Centre FRF, Buftea
Referee: Lotta Vuorio (Finland)
14 March 2023
15:00 (16:00 EET)

Poland	2–2	Czech Republic
Jagodzinska 27'; Kuprowska 90+6'	Report	Jancarova 39'; Kadlecová 81'

Concordia, Chiajna
Referee: Oxana Cruc (Moldova)

==== Group A2 ====
Pos	Team	Pld	W	D	L	GF	GA	GD	Pts	Promotion
1	England	3	2	1	0	9	1	+8	7	Qualified for the final tournament
2	Belgium	3	1	1	1	4	7	−3	4 (Note: Head-to-head result: Belgium 2–1 Norway.)	
3	Norway	3	1	1	1	4	3	+1	4	
4	Croatia (H)	3	0	1	2	2	8	−6	1	Relegated to League B for the next tournament qualification

Source: UEFA
Rules for classification: Qualification tiebreakers
(H) Hosts
Notes:
12 March 2023
11:00

England	4–0	Croatia
Round 4'; Agyemang 9', 39'; Lia 87'	Report

Gradski stadion, Sinj
Referee: Anastasia Mylopoulou (Greece)
12 March 2023
15:00

Belgium	2–1	Norway
Hubaut 78'; Demoulin 82'	Report	Andersson 55'

Hrvace, Hrvace
Referee: Minka Vekkeli (Finland)

15 March 2023
15:00

England	4–0	Belgium
Parkinson 17'; Potter 19', 56'; Baker 75'	Report

Gradski stadion - Sinj, Sinj
Referee: Kristina Georgieva (Bulgaria)

16 March 2023
11:00

Norway	2–0	Croatia
Stromnes 64' (pen.); Andersson 85'	Report

Hrvace, Hrvace
Referee: Minka Vekkeli (Finland)

18 March 2023
11:00

Norway	1–1	England
Svendheim 45+2'	Report	Baker 36' (pen.)

Hrvace, Hrvace
Referee: Kristina Georgieva (Bulgaria)
18 March 2023
11:00

Croatia	2–2	Belgium
Petković 47'; Gavrić 76'	Report	Van Besauw 34'; Vanluyten 87'

Gradski stadion, Sinj
Referee: Anastasia Mylopoulou (Greece)

==== Group A3 ====
Pos	Team	Pld	W	D	L	GF	GA	GD	Pts	Promotion
1	Germany	3	2	1	0	20	4	+16	7	Qualified for the final tournament
2	Portugal (H)	3	2	1	0	13	2	+11	7	
3	Hungary	3	1	0	2	9	9	0	3	
4	North Macedonia	3	0	0	3	0	27	−27	0	Relegated to League B for the next tournament qualification

Source: UEFA
Rules for classification: Qualification tiebreakers
(H) Hosts
23 March 2023
15:00 (14:00 WET)

Germany	13–0	North Macedonia
Merino Gonzalez 3', 29', 32', 42'; Schmidt 45+1'; Portella 47', 90+1'; Krüger 53', 54'; Röder 67'; Baum 69'; Scholz 71', 79'	Report

Real Sport Club, Queluz
Referee: Maria Ennsgraber (Austria)
23 March 2023
18:00 (17:00 WET)

Hungary	0–4	Portugal
	Report	Correia 16'; Martins 35', 50'; Machado 37'

Nacional Do Jamor, Oeiras
Referee: Caroline Lanssens (Belgium)

26 March 2023
15:00 (14:00 WET)

Germany	5–2	Hungary
Gonzalez 27', 43'; Acsádi 35' (o.g.); Boboy 81', 84'	Report	Gégény 49'; Murár 90+2'

Nacional Do Jamor, Oeiras
Referee: Deborah Bianchi (Italy)
26 March 2023
18:00 (17:00 WET)

Portugal	7–0	North Macedonia
Martins 19' (pen.), 34'; Tomaz 45+3'; Correia 68'; Marques 75', 90+1'; Bras 88'	Report

Cidade do Futebol, Oeiras
Referee: Caroline Lanssens (Belgium)

29 March 2023
16:00 (15:00 WET)

Portugal	2–2	Germany
Guedes 41'; Mariano 53'	Report	Schetter 56'; Scholz 66'

Cidade do Futebol, Oeiras
Referee: Deborah Bianchi (Italy)
29 March 2023
16:00 (15:00 WET)

North Macedonia	0–7	Hungary
	Report	Murár 33'; Kagyi 35'; Sinka 40', 79'; Acsádi 57'; Nagy 83', 90+5'

Real Sport Club, Queluz
Referee: Maria Ennsgraber (Austria)

==== Group A4 ====
Pos	Team	Pld	W	D	L	GF	GA	GD	Pts	Promotion
1	Switzerland	3	3	0	0	7	1	+6	9	Qualified for the final tournament
2	Slovenia (H)	3	2	0	1	3	3	0	6	
3	Austria	3	1	0	2	4	2	+2	3	
4	Slovakia	3	0	0	3	0	8	−8	0	Relegated to League B for the next tournament qualification

Source: UEFA
Rules for classification: Qualification tiebreakers
(H) Hosts
17 March 2023
15:30

Switzerland	3–0	Slovakia
Pfister 36', 84'; J. Egli 79'	Report

Brežice, Brežice
Referee: Michaela Pachtova (Czech Republic)
17 March 2023
15:30

Austria	0–1	Slovenia
	Report	Omerzu 51'

Igrišče Terme Čatež, Čatež ob Savi
Referee: Nanna Løf Andersen (Denmark)

20 March 2023
15:30

Switzerland	1–0	Austria
J. Egli 13'	Report

Brežice, Brežice
Referee: Olatz Rivera Olmedo (Spain)
20 March 2023
15:30

Slovenia	1–0	Slovakia
Plevel 90+4'	Report

Igrišče Terme Čatež, Čatež ob Savi
Referee: Nanna Løf Andersen (Denmark)

23 March 2023
15:30

Slovenia	1–3	Switzerland
Testen 18'	Report	Schertenleib 8'; Klingenstein 63'; J. Egli 90+1'

Igrišče Terme Čatež, Čatež ob Savi
Referee: Olatz Rivera Olmedo (Spain)
23 March 2023
15:30

Slovakia	0–4	Austria
	Report	Sisic 7'; Albrecht 35'; Illinger 49', 78'

Brežice, Brežice
Referee: Michaela Pachtova (Czech Republic)

==== Group A5 ====
Pos	Team	Pld	W	D	L	GF	GA	GD	Pts	Promotion
1	France (H)	3	3	0	0	14	2	+12	9	Qualified for the final tournament
2	Republic of Ireland	3	2	0	1	5	6	−1	6	
3	Italy	3	1	0	2	5	4	+1	3	
4	Kosovo	3	0	0	3	0	12	−12	0	Relegated to League B for the next tournament qualification

Source: UEFA
Rules for classification: Qualification tiebreakers
(H) Hosts
23 March 2023
13:00

Republic of Ireland	3–0	Kosovo
Bradley 8'; Ralph 25'; Fitzgerald 27'	Report

Jean André Maye, Tarnos
Referee: Teresa Oliveira (Portugal)
23 March 2023
16:00

Italy	1–3	France
Testa 52'	Report	N. Traoré 15'; Joseph 40'; Mendy 45'

Stade Didier Deschamps, Bayonne
Referee: Maral Mirzai Beni (Sweden)

26 March 2023
13:00

Republic of Ireland	1–0	Italy
Fitzgerald 25'	Report

Jean André Maye, Tarnos
Referee: Deborah Anex (Switzerland)
26 March 2023
16:00

France	5–0	Kosovo
Rambaud 18'; Ben Khaled 23'; Joseph 36'; N. Traoré 74'; Effa Effa 79'	Report

Stade Didier Deschamps, Bayonne
Referee: Maral Mirzai Beni (Sweden)

29 March 2023
15:00

France	6–1	Republic of Ireland
N. Traoré 9'; Joseph 61', 64'; Mendy 84', 88'; K. Traoré 90+5'	Report	Turner 37'

Jean André Maye, Tarnos
Referee: Deborah Anex (Switzerland)
29 March 2023
15:00

Kosovo	0–4	Italy
	Report	Sciabica 7'; Pizzuti 9'; Pellegrino Cimò 80', 81'

Stade Didier Deschamps, Bayonne
Referee: Teresa Oliveira (Portugal)

==== Group A6 ====
Pos	Team	Pld	W	D	L	GF	GA	GD	Pts	Promotion
1	Spain	3	3	0	0	14	1	+13	9	Qualified for the final tournament
2	Denmark	3	2	0	1	9	3	+6	6	
3	Belarus	3	0	1	2	0	9	−9	1	
4	Serbia (H)	3	0	1	2	0	10	−10	1	Relegated to League B for the next tournament qualification

Source: UEFA
Rules for classification: Qualification tiebreakers
(H) Hosts
12 March 2023
11:00

Spain	6–0	Belarus
Martínez García 19'; López 27', 82'; Librán 45'; Harshkova 62' (o.g.); Gómez Luna 77'	Report

Serbian FA Sports Center, Stara Pazova
Referee: Lisa Benn (England)
12 March 2023
14:00

Serbia	0–5	Denmark
	Report	Christensen 30'; Saini 67'; Pedersen 75'; Lerche 88', 90'

Serbian FA Sports Center, Stara Pazova
Referee: Triinu Laos (Estonia)

15 March 2023
11:00

Denmark	3–0	Belarus
Lerche 8'; Kaihoj 13'; Amby 90+2'	Report

Serbian FA Sports Center, Stara Pazova
Referee: Triinu Laos (Estonia)
15 March 2023
14:00

Spain	5–0	Serbia
Alguacil 34', 82'; López 38'; Segura 51'; Comendador 88'	Report

Serbian FA Sports Center, Stara Pazova
Referee: Michalina Diakow (Poland)

18 March 2023
14:00

Denmark	1–3	Spain
Nielsen 85'	Report	Alguacil 41', 45+1', 90+1'

Serbian FA Sports Center, Stara Pazova
Referee: Michalina Diakow (Poland)
18 March 2023
14:00

Belarus	0–0	Serbia
	Report

Serbian FA Sports Center, Stara Pazova
Referee: Lisa Benn (England)

==== Group A7 ====
Pos	Team	Pld	W	D	L	GF	GA	GD	Pts	Promotion
1	Sweden	3	3	0	0	6	2	+4	9	Qualified for the final tournament
2	Netherlands (H)	3	2	0	1	7	3	+4	6	
3	Finland	3	1	0	2	5	6	−1	3	
4	Wales	3	0	0	3	2	9	−7	0	Relegated to League B for the next tournament qualification

Source: UEFA
Rules for classification: Qualification tiebreakers
(H) Hosts
8 March 2023
19:00

Sweden	2–1	Finland
Pelgander 24'; Jensen 52'	Report	Walta 57'

Sportpark Bovenmolen, Oldebroek
Referee: Alexandra Collin (France)
8 March 2023
19:00

Netherlands	4–0	Wales
Oude Elberink 32', 52' (pen.); Weiman 49'; Iedema 82'	Report

Sportpark Vondersweijde, Oldenzaal
Referee: Réka Molnar (Hungary)

11 March 2023
16:00

Finland	2–1	Wales
Ulenius 6'; Ljesnjanin 82'	Report	Griffiths 66'

Sportpark Vondersweijde, Oldenzaal
Referee: Alexandra Collin (France)
11 March 2023
16:00

Netherlands	0–1	Sweden
	Report	Holmberg 75'

Sportpark Bovenmolen, Oldebroek
Referee: Michèle Schmölzer (Switzerland)

14 March 2023
19:00

Finland	2–3	Netherlands
Kiviranta 34'; Walta 58'	Report	Proost 55', 70'; Oude Elberink 67'

Sportpark Vondersweijde, Oldenzaal
Referee: Michèle Schmölzer (Switzerland)
14 March 2023
19:00

Wales	1–3	Sweden
Hughes 57' (pen.)	Report	Sjöblom 44'; Hultback Nattland 46'; Andersson 88'

Sportpark Bovenmolen, Oldebroek
Referee: Réka Molnar (Hungary)

=== League B ===
Times are CET/CEST, as listed by UEFA (local times, if different, are in parentheses).

==== Group B1 ====
Pos	Team	Pld	W	D	L	GF	GA	GD	Pts	Promotion
1	Greece	3	3	0	0	12	0	+12	9	Promoted to League A for the next tournament qualification
2	Faroe Islands	3	2	0	1	8	3	+5	6	
3	Lithuania (H)	3	1	0	2	6	7	−1	3	
4	Moldova	3	0	0	3	0	16	−16	0	

Source: UEFA
Rules for classification: Qualification tiebreakers
(H) Hosts
24 March 2023
10:00 (11:00 EET)

Lithuania	1–2	Faroe Islands
Penkauskaitė 84'	Report	Jakobsen 21'; Dalheim 30'

LFF Stadium, Vilnius
Referee: Jana Van Laere (Belgium)
24 March 2023
15:00 (16:00 EET)

Greece	5–0	Moldova
Fanouraki 14', 79'; Ivits 45+1'; Lazarakis 47', 48'	Report

LFF Stadium, Vilnius
Referee: Cansu Tryak (Turkey)

27 March 2023
10:00 (11:00 EEST)

Faroe Islands	6–0	Moldova
L.T. Johannesen 12'; Dalheim 13'; Mikkelsen 55', 74'; Godtfred 67'; Lazăr 71' (o.g.)	Report

LFF Stadium, Vilnius
Referee: Jana Van Laere (Belgium)
27 March 2023
16:00 (17:00 EEST)

Greece	5–0	Lithuania
Fakinou 7'; Kosta 32', 89'; Lazarakis 45'; Giovani 61' (pen.)	Report

LFF Stadium, Vilnius
Referee: Silvia Gasperotti (Italy)

30 March 2023
10:00 (11:00 EEST)

Faroe Islands	0–2	Greece
	Report	Fakinou 21'; Gianni 90+3'

LFF Stadium, Vilnius
Referee: Silvia Gasperotti (Italy)
30 March 2023
15:00 (16:00 EEST)

Moldova	0–5	Lithuania
	Report	Kazarina 11' (pen.), 29'; Lazăr 38' (o.g.); Jokubaitytė 52'; Medvedeva 83'

LFF Stadium, Vilnius
Referee: Cansu Tryak (Turkey)

==== Group B2 ====
Pos	Team	Pld	W	D	L	GF	GA	GD	Pts	Promotion
1	Bosnia and Herzegovina (H)	3	3	0	0	11	2	+9	9	Promoted to League A for the next tournament qualification
2	Montenegro	3	2	0	1	21	5	+16	6	
3	Azerbaijan	3	1	0	2	3	8	−5	3	
4	Kazakhstan	3	0	0	3	0	20	−20	0	

Source: UEFA
Rules for classification: Qualification tiebreakers
(H) Hosts
22 March 2023
14:00

Azerbaijan	2–0	Kazakhstan
Salamzada 17' (pen.); Hasanova 80'	Report

Novi Gradski, Ugljevik
Referee: Viki De Cremer (Belgium)
22 March 2023
14:00

Bosnia and Herzegovina	4–2	Montenegro
Muhić 9'; Hadžikadunić 17'; Radošević 45'; Pupić 51'	Report	Tomašević 41', 45+3'

Stadium Etno Selo Stanišići, Bijeljina
Referee: Elena Gobjila (Moldova)

25 March 2023
14:00

Kazakhstan	0–13	Montenegro
	Report	Tomašević 4', 7', 26', 28', 37'; Osmajić 6'; Čađenović 8', 90+3'; Đurković 19', 88'; Milović 25'; Boričić 31', 77'

Novi Gradski, Ugljevik
Referee: Viki De Cremer (Belgium)
25 March 2023
14:00

Bosnia and Herzegovina	2–0	Azerbaijan
Rankić 39', 45'	Report

Stadium Etno Selo Stanišići, Bijeljina
Referee: Ana Maria Alexandra Terteleac (Romania)

28 March 2023
14:00

Montenegro	6–1	Azerbaijan
Tomašević 10', 61'; Merdović 40'; Osmajić 54'; T. Milović 72'; V. Milović 76'	Report	Salamzada 34'

Stadium Etno Selo Stanišići, Bijeljina
Referee: Elena Gobjila (Moldova)
28 March 2023
14:00

Kazakhstan	0–5	Bosnia and Herzegovina
	Report	Rankić 16', 31' (pen.), 70'; Hadžikadunić 50'; Brnić 76'

Novi Gradski, Ugljevik
Referee: Ana Maria Alexandra Terteleac (Romania)

==== Group B3 ====
Pos	Team	Pld	W	D	L	GF	GA	GD	Pts	Promotion
1	Scotland (H)	2	2	0	0	8	0	+8	6	Promoted to League A for the next tournament qualification
2	Israel	2	1	0	1	3	6	−3	3	
3	Georgia	2	0	0	2	2	7	−5	0	

Source: UEFA
Rules for classification: Qualification tiebreakers
(H) Hosts
9 March 2023
16:00 (15:00 GMT)

Scotland	4–0	Israel
Taylor 3', 77'; Forrest 81'; Berry 90+3'	Report

Ainslie Park Stadium, Edinburgh
Referee: Marisca Overtoom (Netherlands)

12 March 2023
15:00 (14:00 GMT)

Israel	3–2	Georgia
Moscovici 57' (pen.); Goulden 69', 81'	Report	Vodolazov 45+1' (o.g.); Bukhrikidze 74'

Ainslie Park Stadium, Edinburgh
Referee: Fabienne Michel (Germany)

15 March 2023
13:00 (12:00 GMT)

Georgia	0–4	Scotland
	Report	Berry 1', 90'; Taylor 42' (pen.); Clark 71'

Ainslie Park Stadium, Edinburgh
Referee: Kateryna Usova (Ukraine)

==== Group B4 ====
Pos	Team	Pld	W	D	L	GF	GA	GD	Pts	Promotion
1	Iceland	2	2	0	0	19	0	+19	6	Promoted to League A for the next tournament qualification
2	Luxembourg	2	1	0	1	3	6	−3	3	
3	Albania (H)	2	0	0	2	0	16	−16	0	

Source: UEFA
Rules for classification: Qualification tiebreakers
(H) Hosts
15 March 2023
11:30

Albania	0–3	Luxembourg
	Report	Merlevede 14', 56'; Konsbruck 45+1' (pen.)

Arena Kombëtare, Tirana
Referee: Fatemeh Zangeneh (Norway)

18 March 2023
11:30

Luxembourg	0–6	Iceland
	Report	M. B. Kristinsdóttir 31', 46', 53'; Hlynsdóttir 45+2', 58'; Borruso 74' (o.g.)

Arena Kombëtare, Tirana
Referee: Zoe Stavrou (Cyprus)

21 March 2023
11:30

Iceland	13–0	Albania
M. B. Kristinsdóttir 7', 45', 52', 70'; Hlynsdóttir 8', 30'; Tryggvadóttir 19', 33'; Báðardóttir 48'; J. Halldórsdóttir 64'; Davíðsdóttir 84'; H. Halldórsdóttir 86', 90+2'	Report

Arena Kombëtare, Tirana
Referee: Jelena Kumer (Croatia)

==== Group B5 ====
Pos	Team	Pld	W	D	L	GF	GA	GD	Pts	Promotion
1	Northern Ireland	1	1	0	0	2	0	+2	3	Promoted to League A for the next tournament qualification
2	Turkey (H)	1	0	0	1	0	2	−2	0	
3	Armenia	0	0	0	0	0	0	0	0	Withdrew

Source: UEFA
Rules for classification: Qualification tiebreakers
(H) Hosts
24 March 2023
11:00

Turkey	0–2	Northern Ireland
	Report	Moore 62'; McIntyre 82'

Arslan Zeki Demirci Spor Kompleksi - Emir Hotels 1, Manavgat
Referee: Eirini Pingiou (Greece)

==== Group B6 ====
Pos	Team	Pld	W	D	L	GF	GA	GD	Pts	Promotion
1	Ukraine	2	2	0	0	7	1	+6	6	Promoted to League A for the next tournament qualification
2	Bulgaria (H)	2	1	0	1	4	3	+1	3	Promoted to League A for the next tournament qualification
3	Latvia	2	0	0	2	1	8	−7	0	

Source: UEFA
Rules for classification: Qualification tiebreakers
(H) Hosts
3 March 2023
13:30 (14:30 EET)

Bulgaria	1–2	Ukraine
Naydenova 35'	Report	Borovska 33'; Ptytsyna 38'

Stadion Hadzhi Dimitar, Sliven
Attendance: 250
Referee: Tanja Račić (Bosnia and Herzegovina)

6 March 2023
13:30 (14:30 EET)

Ukraine	5–0	Latvia
Mergupe-Kutraite 14' (o.g.); Zaborovets 45+1' (pen.); Iuzva 56'; Ptytsyna 78'; Borovska 88'	Report

Stadion Hadzhi Dimitar, Sliven
Attendance: 500
Referee: Emanuela Rusta (Albania)

9 March 2023
13:30 (14:30 EET)

Latvia	1–3	Bulgaria
Mihaylova 69' (o.g.)	Report	Dimanova 8'; Demirova 28'; Petrova 90+4'

Stadion Hadzhi Dimitar, Sliven
Referee: Frederikke Lydia Søkjær (Denmark)

==== Ranking of second-placed teams ====
To determine the best runner-up, only the results of the runner-up teams against the first-placed team in their group are taken into account.

Pos	Grp	Team	Pld	W	D	L	GF	GA	GD	Pts	Qualification
1	B6	Bulgaria	1	0	0	1	1	2	−1	0	Promotion to League A for the next tournament qualification
2	B2	Montenegro	1	0	0	1	2	4	−2	0	
3	B1	Faroe Islands	1	0	0	1	0	2	−2	0 (Note: Ranked by disciplinary points (Faroe Islands: 0 pt; Turkey: 2 pts).)	
4	B5	Turkey	1	0	0	1	0	2	−2	0	
5	B3	Israel	1	0	0	1	0	4	−4	0	
6	B4	Luxembourg	1	0	0	1	0	6	−6	0	

Source: UEFA
Rules for classification: 1) points; 2) goal difference; 3) goals scored; 4) disciplinary points; 5) higher position in the round 1 league ranking.

== Qualified teams ==
Seven teams will qualify for the final tournament along with hosts Estonia.

Team	Qualified as	Qualified on	Previous appearances in Under-17 Euro^{1} only U-17 era (since 2008)
Estonia	Hosts	19 April 2021	0 (debut)
Poland	Round 2 Group A1 winners	14 March 2023	2 (**2013**, 2018)
England	Round 2 Group A2 winners	18 March 2023	7 (2008, 2014, 2015, 2016, 2017, 2018, 2019)
Germany	Round 2 Group A3 winners	29 March 2023	12 (**2008**, **2009**, 2010, 2011, **2012**, **2014**, 2015, **2016**, **2017**, 2018, **2019**, **2022**)
Switzerland	Round 2 Group A4 winners	23 March 2023	2 (2012, 2015)
France	Round 2 Group A5 winners	29 March 2023	8 (2008, 2009, 2011, 2012, 2014, 2015, 2017, 2022)
Spain	Round 2 Group A6 winners	18 March 2023	11 (2009, **2010**, **2011**, 2013, 2014, **2015**, 2016, 2017, **2018**, 2019, 2022)
Sweden	Round 2 Group A7 winners	11 March 2023	1 (2013)

^{1} Bold indicates champions for that year. Italic indicates hosts for that year.

== Goalscorers ==
In the Round 1 there were 247 goals scored in 66 matches, for an average of 3.74 goals per match.

In the Round 2 there have been 174 goals scored in 64 matches, for an average of 2.72 goals per match (as of 30 March 2023).

In total, there have been 421 goals scored in 130 matches, for an average of 3.24 goals per match (as of 30 March 2023).

9 goals

- (Montenegro) Maša Tomašević

8 goals

- (England) Ava Baker
- (Germany) Estrella Merino Gonzalez

7 goals

- (Iceland) Margrét Brynja Kristinsdóttir

6 goals

- (Belarus) Anastasiya Kavaliova
- (Kosovo) Alba Shabani

5 goals

- (Bosnia and Herzegovina) Una Rankić
- (France) Liana Joseph
- (France) Maeline Mendy
- (Iceland) Ísabella Tryggvadóttir
- (Spain) Ainhoa Alguacil

4 goals

- (Albania) Klesta Ago
- (Belarus) Hanna Siniauskaya
- (Denmark) Mie Heftdal Lerche
- (England) Michelle Agyemang
- (England) Madison Earl
- (England) Alexia Potter
- (France) Anaïs Ebayilin
- (Iceland) Berglind Freyja Hlynsdóttir
- (Italy) Giada Pellegrino Cimò
- (Kosovo) Elona Paci
- (Netherlands) Aniek Janssen
- (Portugal) Leonete Correia
- (Portugal) Lara Martins
- (Scotland) Laura Berry
- (Spain) Vicky López
- (Wales) Elena Cole

3 goals

- (Albania) Rosela Vasa
- (Denmark) Emma Nielsen
- (Denmark) Anisa Saini
- (France) Naolia Traoré
- (Germany) Marina Scholz
- (Germany) Melina Walheim
- (Greece) Nicole Lazarakis
- (Iceland) Hrafnhildur Ása Halldórsdóttir
- (Latvia) Elīza Paula Sīpola
- (Luxembourg) Charlotte Schmit
- (Montenegro) Katarina Čađenović
- (North Macedonia) Emili Mitkovska
- (Netherlands) Eva Oude Elberink
- (Norway) Tomine Svendheim
- (Romania) Ioana Stancu
- (Scotland) Rebecca Taylor
- (Slovakia) Matilda Sluková
- (Slovenia) Tinkara Testen
- (Spain) Cristina Redondo
- (Spain) Celia Segura
- (Switzerland) Janina Egli
- (Switzerland) Sydney Joy Schertenleib

2 goals

- (Albania) Era Methoxha
- (Armenia) Isabela Maneh Nersesian
- (Austria) Sarah Gutmann
- (Austria) Valentina Illinger
- (Azerbaijan) Ayshan Salamzada
- (Belarus) Kseniya Yatsynovich
- (Bosnia and Herzegovina) Lina Hadžikadunić
- (Croatia) Lana Lovrić
- (Croatia) Paula Petković
- (Czech Republic) Markéta Jančářová
- (Czech Republic) Katerina Vithova
- (Denmark) Alma Aagaard
- (Denmark) Signe Antvorskov
- (Denmark) Mathilde Skøt Kaihøj
- (England) Vivienne Lia
- (Faroe Islands) Eydna Dalheim
- (Faroe Islands) Helga Mikkelsen
- (Finland) Milja Kiviranta
- (Finland) Kerttu Sarelius
- (Finland) Ilona Walta
- (France) Nermyne Ben Khaled
- (France) Valeryane Policnik
- (Germany) Delice Boboy
- (Germany) Melina Krüger
- (Germany) Laila Portella
- (Germany) Leonie Schetter
- (Greece) Argyro Fakinou
- (Greece) Maria Fanouraki
- (Greece) Zoi Amaryllis Kosta
- (Hungary) Viktória Murár
- (Hungary) Lili Nagy
- (Hungary) Napsugár Sinka
- (Iceland) Emelía Óskarsdóttir
- (Iceland) Ísabella Tryggvadóttir
- (Israel) Adee Goulden
- (Israel) Moran Moscovici
- (Israel) Michaelit Workou
- (Italy) Emma Girotto
- (Kosovo) Shenarta Bela
- (Kosovo) Rita Feka
- (Lithuania) Agnieška Kazarina
- (Lithuania) Patricja Penkauskaitė
- (Luxembourg) Gwendy Merlevede
- (Montenegro) Vladana Boričić
- (Montenegro) Larisa Đurković
- (Montenegro) Vlada Milović
- (Montenegro) Tatjana Osmajić
- (Netherlands) Jade Vienna van Hensbergen
- (Netherlands) Lyanne Baukje Iedema
- (Netherlands) Sophie Proost
- (Netherlands) Christina Cornelia Weiman
- (North Macedonia) Jovana Pavlovska
- (Norway) Tilde Andersson
- (Norway) Signe Amalie Strømnes
- (Poland) Anna Gliszczyńska
- (Poland) Zuzanna Grzywińska
- (Poland) Magdalena Półrolniczak
- (Portugal) Anna Marques
- (Republic of Ireland) Jessica Fitzgerald
- (Romania) Andra Mihaescu
- (Serbia) Teodora Vasić
- (Slovakia) Michaela Martišková
- (Scotland) Mason Clark
- (Spain) Noa Ortega Requena
- (Switzerland) Leela Egli
- (Switzerland) Emanuela Pfister
- (Sweden) Elsa Pelgander
- (Turkey) Tuana Şentürk
- (Ukraine) Diana Borovska
- (Ukraine) Maryna Ptytsyna

1 goal

- (Albania) Ornela Brahaj
- (Albania) Xhesika Ndoj
- (Armenia) Marianna Vardanyan
- (Austria) Selina Albrecht
- (Austria) Lara Höcherl
- (Austria) Tina Krassnig
- (Austria) Almedina Sisic
- (Azerbaijan) Aydan Hasanova
- (Belarus) Milana Belavus
- (Belarus) Renata Kalinouskaya
- (Belarus) Darya Karabanko
- (Belarus) Sofia Karachun
- (Belarus) Anastasiya Maher
- (Belarus) Alena Rabrova
- (Belgium) Siska Demoulin
- (Belgium) Léna Hubaut
- (Belgium) Flore Pirenne
- (Belgium) Axelle Van Besauw
- (Belgium) Lola Vanluyten
- (Bosnia and Herzegovina) Nina Brnić
- (Bosnia and Herzegovina) Samra Muhić
- (Bosnia and Herzegovina) Nina Pupić
- (Bosnia and Herzegovina) Ivona Radošević
- (Bulgaria) Polina Demirova
- (Bulgaria) Nikol Dimanova
- (Bulgaria) Silvia Naydenova
- (Bulgaria) Mirela Petrova
- (Croatia) Mia Gavrić
- (Croatia) Stela Veseli
- (Croatia) Tea Vračević
- (Croatia) Lucija Vunić
- (Czech Republic) Radka Jakubů
- (Czech Republic) Barbora Kadlecová
- (Czech Republic) Lucie Krejčová
- (Czech Republic) Lucie Kroupova
- (Czech Republic) Ester Svobodová
- (Czech Republic) Karolína Vojáčková
- (Denmark) Sara Amby
- (Denmark) Cecilie Carlberg Byrnak
- (Denmark) Signe Tigist Sondergard Christensen
- (Denmark) Emilie Liv Juul Luplau Holt
- (Denmark) Johanne Pedersen
- (England) Lola Brown
- (England) Laila Harbert
- (England) Erica Parkinson
- (England) Milly Round
- (Estonia) Elisabeth Õispuu
- (Estonia) Aleksandra Orlova
- (Estonia) Jane Mirjam
- (Faroe Islands) Súsanna Godtfred
- (Faroe Islands) Fríða Jakobsen
- (Faroe Islands) Lea Johannesen
- (Finland) Steffi Hassinen
- (Finland) Anelma Lahikainen
- (Finland) Anela Ljesnjanin
- (Finland) Olivia Ulenius
- (France) Kelly Camara
- (France) Chancelle Effa Effa
- (France) Elisa Rambaud
- (France) Kadidia Traoré
- (Georgia (country)) Nino Bukhrikidze
- (Germany) Lisa Baum
- (Germany) Melina Bünning
- (Germany) Amy Milz
- (Germany) Sarah Preuß
- (Germany) Milena Röder
- (Germany) Sara Sahiti
- (Germany) Lilith Schmidt
- (Germany) Maj Schneider
- (Germany) Leni Wileschek
- (Greece) Michaela Gianni
- (Greece) Natalia Giovani
- (Greece) Mila Ivits
- (Hungary) Petra Acsádi
- (Hungary) Petra Gégény
- (Hungary) Kira Kagyi
- (Hungary) Sára Szarvas
- (Iceland) Sigdís Eva Báðardóttir
- (Iceland) Sóley María Davíðsdóttir
- (Iceland) Katrín Rósa Egilsdóttir
- (Iceland) Jóhanna Elín Halldórsdóttir
- (Iceland) Harpa Helgadóttir
- (Israel) Orian Biru
- (Italy) Giulia Dragoni
- (Italy) Elena Pizzuti
- (Italy) Marta Razza
- (Italy) Manuela Sciabica
- (Italy) Sofia Testa
- (Kazakhstan) Ayazhan Kozhabekova
- (Kazakhstan) Assel Orynbay
- (Kosovo) Aurora Mulliqi
- (Latvia) Anna Belova
- (Lithuania) Austėja Jokubaitytė
- (Lithuania) Kamilė Medvedeva
- (Luxembourg) Lena Alves
- (Luxembourg) Olivia Konsbruck
- (Moldova) Evelina Nichifor
- (Montenegro) Jana Merdović
- (Montenegro) Tamara Milović
- (Netherlands) Bo Tess van Egmond
- (North Macedonia) Slagjana Gjorgjieva
- (North Macedonia) Dielza Ibraimi
- (North Macedonia) Anastasia Ilievska
- (North Macedonia) Vaska Vasileva
- (Northern Ireland) Mia Moore
- (Northern Ireland) Rachel McIntyre
- (Norway) Martine Trollsås Fenger
- (Norway) Kaja Bjelde Hjelmhaug
- (Poland) Paulina Guzik
- (Poland) Roksana Jagodzinska
- (Poland) Wiktoria Kuprowska
- (Poland) Inez Sikora
- (Portugal) Luisa Bras
- (Portugal) Marta Gago
- (Portugal) Neide Guedes
- (Portugal) Sofia Machado
- (Portugal) Mafalda Mariano
- (Portugal) Ana Tomaz
- (Republic of Ireland) Fiana Bradley
- (Republic of Ireland) Ruby Gallagher
- (Republic of Ireland) Jodie J. Loughrey
- (Republic of Ireland) Aoife Kelly
- (Republic of Ireland) Joy Ralph
- (Republic of Ireland) Aoife Turner
- (Romania) Alexandra Boboc
- (Romania) Alesia Dincă-Vuia
- (Romania) Anamaria Filip
- (Romania) Eszter Szoke
- (Scotland) Lisa Forrest
- (Scotland) Mia McAuley
- (Serbia) Anđela Marković
- (Serbia) Nađa Uvalin
- (Slovakia) Katarína Bučková
- (Slovakia) Dominika Gondová
- (Slovakia) Simona Horváthová
- (Slovakia) Tamara Kramlíková
- (Slovakia) Nikola Pajunková
- (Slovakia) Sára Straková
- (Slovenia) Zara Kramžar
- (Slovenia) Zala Omerza
- (Slovenia) Ula Omerzu
- (Slovenia) Jerca Plevel
- (Spain) Daniela Arques
- (Spain) Lorena Cubo Barroso
- (Spain) Paula Comendador
- (Spain) Ainoa Gómez Luna
- (Spain) Cristina Librán
- (Spain) Daniela Martínez García
- (Sweden) Bella Andersson
- (Sweden) Ida Björnberg
- (Sweden) Smilla Holmberg
- (Sweden) Bianca Hultback Nattland
- (Sweden) Novalie Jensen
- (Sweden) Olivia Sjöblom
- (Sweden) Hannah Sjödahl
- (Switzerland) Meret Arnold
- (Switzerland) Anja Klingenstein
- (Switzerland) Nevia Stoob
- (Switzerland) Leila Wandeler
- (Ukraine) Anastasiia Astakhova
- (Ukraine) Kateryna Iuzva
- (Ukraine) Lidiia Zaborovets
- (Wales) Ania Denham
- (Wales) Olivia Francis
- (Wales) Mared Griffiths
- (Wales) Evie Hughes
- (Wales) Chloe McMahon
- (Wales) Maddison Perrott

1 own goal

- (Albania) Klevisa Ndoci (against Kosovo)
- (Belarus) Darya Harshkova (against Spain)
- (Bulgaria) Mihaela Mihaylova (against Latvia)
- (Israel) Mariana Vodolazov (against Georgia)
- (Hungary) Petra Acsádi (against Germany
- (Latvia) Linda Mergupe-Kutraite (against Ukraine)
- (Luxembourg) Sofia Borruso (against Iceland)
- (Northern Ireland) Darcie McNeill (against the Republic of Ireland)
- (Scotland) Georgia Gray (against Sweden)
- (Scotland) Mia McArthur (against the Netherlands)
- (Sweden) Tilde Björklund (against the Netherlands)
- (Turkey) Canset Yiğit (against Germany)

2 own goals

- (Greece) Sofia Zagkli (against Spain)
- (Moldova) Ecaterina Lazăr (against Faroe Islands and Lithuania)

Source: UEFA.com
