= Gabriela Annija Andersone =

Latvian footballer (born 2008)

Personal information
- Date of birth: 31 October 2008 (age 18)
- Place of birth: Liepāja, Latvia
- Height: 1.68 m (5 ft 6 in)
- Position: Midfielder

Team information
- Current team: US Sassuolo Calcio

Youth career
- 2016-2022: FK Nīca
- 2022-2023: Liepājas FS

Senior career*
Years	Team	Apps	(Gls)
2023-2024	Liepājas FS	41	(41)
2024-2025	US Sassuolo Calcio U19		
2025-	US Sassuolo Calcio		

International career^{‡}
2020-2022	Latvia U-15	5	(3)
2023-2024	Latvia U-17	17	(6)
2024	Latvia U-19	2	(0)
2025-	Latvia	13	(2)
- * Club domestic league appearances and goals as of 17:38 18 February 2025 (UTC) ‡ National team caps and goals as of 9 June 2026 (UTC)

Gabriela Annija Andersone (born 31 December 2008) is a Latvian footballer who plays as a midfielder for US Sassuolo Calcio U19 women's team and the Latvia national team. In December 2024, Andersone signed her first contract abroad with the Italian club after a fantastic 2024 season in Latvia, during which she scored 17 goals in 21 matches. Andersone won the Latvian Football Federation's "Best Young Female Footballer of the Year" award twice in a row, in 2024 and 2023.

== International career ==
Andersone was called up to the Latvian women's national football team for the first time on February 18, 2025..

== International goals ==
List of international goals scored by Gabriela Annija Andersone.
No.	Date	Venue	Opponent	Score	Result	Competition
1.	27 October 2025	Raudondvaris Stadium, Raudondvaris, Lithuania	Lithuania	2–0	3–0	2025 Baltic Women's Cup
2.	7 March 2026	Helsinki Football Stadium, Helsinki, Finland	Finland	1–3	1–3	2027 FIFA Women's World Cup qualification

== Honours ==
Individual

- Young Footballer of the Year (Latvia): 2023, 2024
