= 2025 UEFA Women's Under-17 Championship qualification =

Tournament details
- Dates: Round 1: 1 October – 20 November 2024; Round 2: 19 February – 23 March 2025
- Teams: 49 (from 1 confederation)

Tournament statistics
- Matches played: 138
- Goals scored: 534 (3.87 per match)
- Top scorer(s): (Sweden) Filippa Sjöström (9 goals)

The 2025 UEFA Women's Under-17 Championship qualification was an under-17 women's national football team competition that determined the seven teams that would join the automatically qualified host team Faroe Islands in the 2025 UEFA Women's Under-17 Championship final tournament.

Five national teams decided not to participate in the event and Russia were excluded from the tournament due to the ongoing invasion of Ukraine. Therefore, including hosts Faroe Islands, 49 teams entered this qualification competition. The Round 1 of the qualification was played from 1 October to 20 November 2024, while the Round 2 was played from 19 February to 23 March 2025. Players born on or after 1 January 2008 were eligible to participate.

== Format ==
The qualification consisted of two rounds, both with teams playing in two tiered leagues. Each round league consisted of several groups, which were played as single-round-robin mini-tournaments, with one team from each group selected as the host after the draw.

- Round 1:
  - League A: 28 teams were drawn into seven groups of four. The top three teams from each group were transferred to Round 2 League A; teams that finished fourth were relegated to Round 2 League B.
  - League B: 21 teams were drawn into six groups of three or four. The group winners and the best runner-up team were promoted to Round 2 League A; the other teams were transferred to Round 2 League B.
- Round 2:
  - League A: 28 teams were drawn into seven groups of four. The group winners qualified for the final tournament. If Faroe Islands, as the host of the final tournament, had won one of these groups, the best runner-up team would also have qualified. Teams that finished fourth were relegated to Round 1 League B for the next season.
  - League B: 21 teams were drawn into six groups of three or four. The group winners and the best runner-up team were promoted to Round 1 League A for the next season.

=== Tiebreakers ===
In a group, teams are ranked according to points (3 points for a win, 1 point for a draw, 0 points for a loss), and if tied on points, the following tiebreaking criteria are applied, in the order given, to determine the rankings (Regulations Articles 17.01 and 17.02):

1. Points in head-to-head matches among tied teams;
2. Goal difference in head-to-head matches among tied teams;
3. Goals scored in head-to-head matches among tied teams;
4. If more than two teams are tied, and after applying all head-to-head criteria above, a subset of teams are still tied, all head-to-head criteria above are reapplied exclusively to this subset of teams;
5. Goal difference in all group matches;
6. Goals scored in all group matches;
7. Penalty shoot-out if only two teams have the same number of points, and they met in the last round of the group and are tied after applying all criteria above (not used if more than two teams have the same number of points, or if their rankings are not relevant for qualification for the next stage);
8. Disciplinary points (red card = 3 points, yellow card = 1 point, expulsion for two yellow cards in one match = 3 points);
9. Position in the applicable ranking:
  1. for teams in Round 1, position in the 2023–24 Round 2 league rankings;
  2. for teams in Round 2, position in the Round 1 league ranking.

To determine the best runner-up team in League B, the results against the teams in fourth place are discarded and the following criteria are applied (Regulations Articles 18.01 and 18.03):

1. Points;
2. Goal difference;
3. Goals scored;
4. Disciplinary points;
5. Position in the applicable ranking:
  1. for teams in Round 1, position in the 2023–24 Round 2 league rankings;
  2. for teams in Round 2, position in the Round 1 league rankings.

== Round 1 ==
=== Draw ===
The draw for the Round 1 was held on 7 June 2024, at the UEFA headquarters in Nyon, Switzerland.

The 49 participating teams were split into two Leagues (28 in League A, 21 in League B) according to their final group standings of Round 2 of the 2023–24 competition (Regulations Article 13.01). To determine this ranking, the following criteria were followed:

1. higher position in the following classification:
  1. Round 2 League A group winners
  2. Round 2 League A group runners-up
  3. Round 2 League A third-placed teams
  4. Teams promoted from Round 2 League B
  5. Teams relegated from Round 2 League A
  6. Round 2 League B runners-up
  7. Round 2 League B third-placed teams
  8. Round 2 League B fourth-placed teams
2. higher number of points in all mini-tournament matches;
3. superior goal difference in all mini-tournament matches;
4. higher number of goals scored in all mini-tournament matches;
5. lower disciplinary points (red card = 3 points, yellow card = 1 point, expulsion for two yellow cards in one match = 3 points);
6. higher position in the 2023–24 Round 1 league rankings.

Within each League, the teams were allocated to four drawing pots (seven teams per pot in League A; six teams in Pots 1 to 3 and three teams in Pot 4 in League B). Teams in the same pot would be drawn into different groups, with League A consisting of seven groups of four teams, and League B consisting of three groups of four and three groups of three teams.

Teams entering League A

The 21 teams of the previous season's Round 2 League A (top three teams in each group) and the seven teams of Round 2 League B (six group winners and the best runner-up) were drawn into seven groups of four teams. The Round 2 League A group winners were automatically seeded into Pot 1, the second- and third-placed teams into Pots 2 and 3, respectively. The previous season's Round 2 League B teams were seeded into Pot 4; their matches against the fourth-placed teams in their group did not count towards this ranking (Regulations Article 13.02).

Pos	Gr (Rk)	Team	Pld	W	D	L	GF	GA	GD	Pts	Seeding
1	A7 (1)	Poland	3	3	0	0	17	1	+16	9	Pot 1
2	A5 (1)	Spain	3	3	0	0	14	1	+13	9	Pot 1
3	A6 (1)	England	3	3	0	0	8	1	+7	9	Pot 1
4	A2 (1)	Portugal	3	3	0	0	5	1	+4	9	Pot 1
5	A1 (1)	France	3	2	1	0	8	1	+7	7	Pot 1
6	A4 (1)	Norway	3	2	1	0	4	2	+2	7	Pot 1
7	A3 (1)	Belgium	3	2	0	1	5	4	+1	6	Pot 1
8	A5 (2)	Netherlands	3	2	0	1	11	4	+7	6	Pot 2
9	A7 (2)	Scotland	3	2	0	1	9	5	+4	6	Pot 2
10	A2 (2)	Finland	3	2	0	1	8	4	+4	6	Pot 2
11	A3 (2)	Austria	3	2	0	1	7	3	+4	6	Pot 2
12=	A6 (2)	Italy	3	2	0	1	5	3	+2	6	Pot 2
12=	A4 (2)	Switzerland	3	2	0	1	5	3	+2	6	Pot 2
14	A1 (2)	Germany	3	1	1	1	3	2	+1	4	Pot 2
15	A2 (3)	Iceland	3	1	0	2	5	3	+2	3	Pot 3
16	A1 (3)	Czech Republic	3	0	3	0	1	1	0	3	Pot 3
17	A7 (3)	Denmark	3	1	0	2	3	4	−1	3	Pot 3
18	A3 (3)	Croatia	3	1	0	2	1	3	−2	3	Pot 3
19	A6 (3)	Greece	3	1	0	2	2	6	−4	3	Pot 3
20	A5 (3)	Turkey	3	1	0	2	2	15	−13	3	Pot 3
21	A4 (3)	Wales	3	0	2	1	3	5	−2	2	Pot 3
22	B6 (1)	Republic of Ireland	2	2	0	0	10	1	+9	6	Pot 4
23=	B1 (1)	Belarus	2	2	0	0	9	2	+7	6	Pot 4
23=	B5 (1)	Northern Ireland	2	2	0	0	9	2	+7	6	Pot 4
25	B4 (1)	Bosnia and Herzegovina	2	2	0	0	8	1	+7	6	Pot 4
26	B2 (1)	Bulgaria	2	1	1	0	7	2	+5	4	Pot 4
27	B3 (1)	Faroe Islands	2	1	0	1	4	3	+1	3	Pot 4
28	B2 (2)	Slovenia	2	1	1	0	5	1	+4	4	Pot 4

Source: UEFA
Rules for classification: 1) round 1 position; 2) points; 3) goal difference; 4) goals scored; 5) disciplinary points; 6) position in the applicable rankings.

Teams entering League B

The seven fourth-placed teams of the previous season's Round 2 League A and the 14 non-promoted teams of Round 2 League B were drawn into six groups of three or four teams. The best six fourth-placed teams of Round 2 League A were automatically seeded into Pot 1. The seventh fourth-placed team of Round 2 League A and the runner-up teams of Round 2 League B were seeded into Pot 2. The third- and fourth-placed teams of the previous season's Round 2 League B were seeded into Pots 3 and 4, respectively. The matches of the second- and third-placed teams of Round 2 League B against the fourth-placed teams in their group did not count towards this ranking (Regulations Article 13.02).

Pos	Gr (Rk)	Team	Pld	W	D	L	GF	GA	GD	Pts	Seeding
1	A3 (4)	Hungary	3	1	0	2	2	5	−3	3	Pot 1
2	A4 (4)	Sweden	3	0	1	2	1	3	−2	1	Pot 1
3	A1 (4)	Slovakia	3	0	1	2	1	9	−8	1	Pot 1
4	A6 (4)	Serbia	3	0	0	3	1	6	−5	0	Pot 1
5	A5 (4)	Ukraine	3	0	0	3	0	7	−7	0	Pot 1
6	A2 (4)	Kosovo	3	0	0	3	0	10	−10	0	Pot 1
7	A7 (4)	North Macedonia	3	0	0	3	0	19	−19	0	Pot 2
8	B3 (2)	Romania	2	1	0	1	3	3	0	3	Pot 2
9	B6 (2)	Israel	2	1	0	1	3	4	−1	3	Pot 2
10	B1 (2)	Montenegro	2	1	0	1	5	8	−3	3	Pot 2
11	B4 (2)	Estonia	2	1	0	1	2	5	−3	3	Pot 2
12	B5 (2)	Luxembourg	2	0	1	1	2	5	−3	1	Pot 2
13	B3 (3)	Latvia	2	1	0	1	2	3	−1	3	Pot 3
14	B5 (3)	Malta	2	0	1	1	2	6	−4	1	Pot 3
15	B1 (3)	Lithuania	2	0	0	2	2	6	−4	0	Pot 3
16	B4 (3)	Kazakhstan	2	0	0	2	1	5	−4	0	Pot 3
17	B6 (3)	Albania	2	0	0	2	2	10	−8	0	Pot 3
18	B2 (3)	Azerbaijan	2	0	0	2	1	10	−9	0	Pot 3
19	B3 (4)	Georgia	3	0	0	3	1	9	−8	0	Pot 4
20	B1 (4)	Andorra	3	0	0	3	0	9	−9	0	Pot 4
21	B2 (4)	Moldova	3	0	0	3	1	16	−15	0	Pot 4

Source: UEFA
Rules for classification: 1) round 1 position; 2) points; 3) goal difference; 4) goals scored; 5) disciplinary points; 6) position in the applicable rankings.

Did not enter

- Armenia
- Cyprus
- Gibraltar
- Liechtenstein
- San Marino

Banned

- Russia

=== League A ===
Times are CET/CEST, (Note: CEST (UTC+2) for dates up to 26 October 2024, and CET (UTC+1) for dates thereafter.) as listed by UEFA (local times, if different, are in parentheses).

==== Group A1 ====
Pos	Team	Pld	W	D	L	GF	GA	GD	Pts	Transfer or relegation
1	Switzerland	3	3	0	0	13	1	+12	9	Transferred to Round 2 League A
2	Portugal (H)	3	2	0	1	16	6	+10	6	Transferred to Round 2 League A
3	Wales	3	1	0	2	4	9	−5	3	Transferred to Round 2 League A
4	Slovenia	3	0	0	3	1	18	−17	0	Relegated to Round 2 League B

Source: www.sofascore.com
Rules for classification: Tiebreakers
(H) Hosts
23 October 2024
15:00

Wales	0–3	Switzerland
	Report	Looser 12'; Gmür 49'; Schmitz 69'

Nacional Do Jamor, Oeiras
Referee: Audrey Gerbel (France)
23 October 2024
18:00

Portugal	10–0	Slovenia
Íris Fernandes 8'; Francisca Castro 13'; Eva Carreira 20', 73'; Matilde Santos 31', 45+1'; Luana Bessa 35'; Carolina Tristão 42', 54'; Cristina Fernandes 90+3'	Report

Cidade do Futebol, Oeiras
Referee: Roxana Recorean (Romania)

26 October 2024
15:00

Switzerland	6–0	Slovenia
Looser 6', 10', 30', 32'; Mischler 82'; Kavaš 90+7' (o.g.)	Report

Nacional Do Jamor, Oeiras
Referee: Audrey Gerbel (France)
26 October 2024
18:00

Portugal	5–2	Wales
Eva Carreira 52', 90+5'; Carolina Tristão 53'; Carolina Simões 61' (pen.), 83' (pen.)	Report	Lewis 7'; Drury 31'

Cidade do Futebol, Oeiras
Referee: Olivia Tschon (Austria)

29 October 2024
12:00

Switzerland	4–1	Portugal
Bianchi 4'; Schmitz 23'; Von Euw 83'; Braun 89'	Report	Matilde Santos 79'

Cidade do Futebol, Oeiras
Referee: Olivia Tschon (Austria)
29 October 2024
12:00

Slovenia	1–2	Wales
Strgar 47'	Report	Marsh 63'; Hair 90+5' (pen.)

Nacional Do Jamor, Oeiras
Referee: Roxana Recorean (Romania)

==== Group A2 ====
Pos	Team	Pld	W	D	L	GF	GA	GD	Pts	Transfer or relegation
1	Germany	3	3	0	0	5	2	+3	9	Transferred to Round 2 League A
2	Belgium (H)	3	2	0	1	6	2	+4	6	Transferred to Round 2 League A
3	Turkey	3	1	0	2	3	5	−2	3	Transferred to Round 2 League A
4	Bosnia and Herzegovina	3	0	0	3	0	5	−5	0	Relegated to Round 2 League B

Source: www.sofascore.com
Rules for classification: Tiebreakers
(H) Hosts
3 November 2024
12:00

Belgium	2–0	Bosnia and Herzegovina
Haentjens 45+1'; Hens 54'	Report

National Training Centre, Tubize
Referee: Elena Gobjila (Moldova)
3 November 2024
19:00

Turkey	1–2	Germany
Taşucu 7'	Report	Maas 6'; Zähringer 90+4'

National Training Centre, Tubize
Referee: Emily Heaslip (England)

6 November 2024
12:00

Germany	1–0	Bosnia and Herzegovina
Zähringer 33' (pen.)	Report

National Training Centre, Tubize
Referee: Emily Heaslip (England)
6 November 2024
19:00

Belgium	3–0	Turkey
Delille 5'; van Bellingen 20' (pen.); van Neste 23'	Report

National Training Centre, Tubize
Referee: Frederikke Lydia Søkjær (Denmark)

9 November 2024
15:00

Germany	2–1	Belgium
Schick 5'; Haentjens 14' (o.g.)	Report	van der Haegen 2'

National Training Centre, Tubize
Referee: Frederikke Lydia Søkjær (Denmark)
9 November 2024
15:00

Bosnia and Herzegovina	0–2	Turkey
	Report	Ozsoy 30'; Ersen 48' (pen.)

Edmond Machtens Stadium, Brussels
Referee: Elena Gobjila (Moldova)

==== Group A3 ====
Pos	Team	Pld	W	D	L	GF	GA	GD	Pts	Transfer or relegation
1	England (H)	3	2	1	0	11	2	+9	7	Transferred to Round 2 League A
2	Czech Republic	3	2	0	1	12	4	+8	6	Transferred to Round 2 League A
3	Netherlands	3	1	1	1	11	5	+6	4	Transferred to Round 2 League A
4	Faroe Islands	3	0	0	3	0	23	−23	0	Relegated to Round 2 League B

Source: www.sofascore.com
Rules for classification: Tiebreakers
(H) Hosts
7 October 2024
13:00

England	7–0	Faroe Islands
Shooter 14'; Anderson 56', 58', 90+2'; Hendle 68'; Hebard 72'; Sarwie 78'	Report

St George's Park, Burton upon Trent
Referee: Vesna Miletic (Bosnia and Herzegovina)
7 October 2024
20:00

Czech Republic	3–2	Netherlands
Vavrlová 45'; Rancová 62'; Eiseltová 70'	Report	Dap 35'; Altena 57'

St George's Park, Burton upon Trent
Referee: Martina Molinaro (Italy)

10 October 2024
13:00

England	2–0	Czech Republic
Anderson 23'; Hendle 30'	Report

St George's Park, Burton upon Trent
Referee: Nanna Løf Andersen (Denmark)
10 October 2024
20:00

Netherlands	7–0	Faroe Islands
El Belati 5', 71', 82'; Vickers 31'; Altena 37'; Koster 40'; van der Vliet 59'	Report

St George's Park, Burton upon Trent
Referee: Martina Molinaro (Italy)

13 October 2024
13:00

Netherlands	2–2	England
Dap 62', 90+1'	Report	Anderson 15'; Koster 45+2' (o.g.)

St George's Park, Burton upon Trent
Referee: Nanna Løf Andersen (Denmark)
13 October 2024
13:00

Faroe Islands	0–9	Czech Republic
	Report	Pávková 19'; Csizmaziová 27'; Vaněčková 34', 55'; Veselá 39'; Daníčková 50', 66'; Šafářová 80'; Kučerová 82'

St George's Park, Burton upon Trent
Referee: Vesna Miletic (Bosnia and Herzegovina)

==== Group A4 ====
Pos	Team	Pld	W	D	L	GF	GA	GD	Pts	Transfer or relegation
1	Scotland (H)	3	3	0	0	5	1	+4	9	Transferred to Round 2 League A
2	Poland	3	2	0	1	7	2	+5	6	Transferred to Round 2 League A
3	Iceland	3	1	0	2	3	3	0	3	Transferred to Round 2 League A
4	Northern Ireland	3	0	0	3	0	9	−9	0	Relegated to Round 2 League B

Source: www.sofascore.com
Rules for classification: Tiebreakers
(H) Hosts
1 October 2024
12:30

Iceland	0–2	Scotland
	Report	English 8'; Mcdonald 58'

Broadwood Stadium, Cumbernauld
Referee: Emilie Torkelsen (Norway)
1 October 2024
16:30

Poland	5–0	Northern Ireland
Zając 7'; Madejczyk 28'; Skrzypczak 46'; Burzan 54'; Guzenda 83'	Report

Broadwood Stadium, Cumbernauld
Referee: María Eugenia Gil Soriano (Spain)

4 October 2024
12:30

Scotland	1–0	Northern Ireland
Burn 88'	Report

Broadwood Stadium, Cumbernauld
Referee: Emilie Torkelsen (Norway)
4 October 2024
16:30

Poland	1–0	Iceland
Guzenda 34'	Report

Broadwood Stadium, Cumbernauld
Referee: Jelena Kumer (Croatia)

7 October 2024
16:00

Scotland	2–1	Poland
Mcgoldrick 48'; Fraser 55'	Report	Guzenda 4'

Broadwood Stadium, Cumbernauld
Referee: Jelena Kumer (Croatia)
7 October 2024
16:00

Northern Ireland	0–3	Iceland
	Report	Kristjánsdóttir 24'; Brynjarsdóttir 56'; Jóhannesdóttir 79'

Falkirk Stadium, Falkirk
Referee: María Eugenia Gil Soriano (Spain)

==== Group A5 ====
Pos	Team	Pld	W	D	L	GF	GA	GD	Pts	Transfer or relegation
1	Italy	3	2	0	1	4	2	+2	6	Transferred to Round 2 League A
2	France	3	1	2	0	3	1	+2	5	Transferred to Round 2 League A
3	Croatia (H)	3	1	1	1	3	3	0	4	Transferred to Round 2 League A
4	Bulgaria	3	0	1	2	0	4	−4	1	Relegated to Round 2 League B

Source: www.sofascore.com
Rules for classification: Tiebreakers
(H) Hosts
1 November 2024
11:30

Croatia	0–2	Italy
	Report	Gianfico 39'; Galli 56'

Stadion Hrvatski vitezovi, Dugopolje
Referee: Jeļena Jermolajeva (Latvia)
1 November 2024
14:00

France	0–0	Bulgaria
	Report

Gradski stadion Hrvace, Hrvace
Referee: María Eugenia Gil Soriano (Spain)

4 November 2024
11:30

France	1–1	Croatia
Djoubri 22'	Report	Bandula 16'

Gradski stadion Hrvace, Hrvace
Referee: Caroline Lanssens (Belgium)
4 November 2024
14:00

Italy	2–0	Bulgaria
Galli 17'; Bedini 28'	Report

Stadion Hrvatski vitezovi, Dugopolje
Referee: Jeļena Jermolajeva (Latvia)

7 November 2024
11:30

Italy	0–2	France
	Report	Adedini 66'; Morissaint 84'

Gradski stadion Hrvace, Hrvace
Referee: Caroline Lanssens (Belgium)
7 November 2024
11:30

Bulgaria	0–2	Croatia
	Report	Grgić 29'; Bandula 43'

Stadion Hrvatski vitezovi, Dugopolje
Referee: María Eugenia Gil Soriano (Spain)

==== Group A6 ====
Pos	Team	Pld	W	D	L	GF	GA	GD	Pts	Transfer or relegation
1	Spain (H)	3	2	1	0	10	4	+6	7	Transferred to Round 2 League A
2	Austria	3	1	2	0	8	4	+4	5	Transferred to Round 2 League A
3	Denmark	3	1	1	1	4	6	−2	4	Transferred to Round 2 League A
4	Republic of Ireland	3	0	0	3	3	11	−8	0	Relegated to Round 2 League B

Source: www.sofascore.com
Rules for classification: Tiebreakers
(H) Hosts
14 November 2024
11:00

Spain	4–1	Republic of Ireland
Indias 25'; Navarro 35', 65' (pen.), 90+4'	Report	Mcgrath 80'

Estadio Municipal Guillermo Amor, Benidorm
Referee: Laura Mauricio (Switzerland)
14 November 2024
15:30

Denmark	1–1	Austria
Jørgensen 16'	Report	Lueger 77'

Estadio Polideportivo Municipal Pau Gasol, L'Alfàs del Pi
Referee: Anastasiya Romanyuk (Ukraine)

17 November 2024
11:00

Spain	3–0	Denmark
Carvajal 34'; Chacón 37', 66'	Report

Estadio Polideportivo Municipal Pau Gasol, L'Alfàs del Pi
Referee: Eglantina Pjetrushaj (Albania)
17 November 2024
17:00

Austria	4–0	Republic of Ireland
Newell 6' (o.g.); Osl 29' (pen.); Lueger 32'; Dike 89'	Report

Estadio Municipal Guillermo Amor, Benidorm
Referee: Anastasiya Romanyuk (Ukraine)

20 November 2024
11:00

Austria	3–3	Spain
Osl 28'; Pamminger 64'; Pötzl 69'	Report	Quer 45+1'; Carvajal 90+1'; Zuazo 90+2'

Estadio Municipal Guillermo Amor, Benidorm
Referee: Eglantina Pjetrushaj (Albania)
20 November 2024
11:00

Republic of Ireland	2–3	Denmark
Butler 71'; Kelly 90+3'	Report	Thierry 41', 57'; Domino 79'

Campo Municipal Antonio Solana, Alicante
Referee: Laura Mauricio (Switzerland)

==== Group A7 ====
Pos	Team	Pld	W	D	L	GF	GA	GD	Pts	Transfer or relegation
1	Norway (H)	3	3	0	0	14	0	+14	9	Transferred to Round 2 League A
2	Finland	3	2	0	1	5	4	+1	6	Transferred to Round 2 League A
3	Greece	3	1	0	2	3	6	−3	3	Transferred to Round 2 League A
4	Belarus	3	0	0	3	0	12	−12	0	Relegated to Round 2 League B

Source: www.sofascore.com
Rules for classification: Tiebreakers
(H) Hosts
23 October 2024
12:00

Greece	0–3	Finland
	Report	Mandelin 32'; Ahlroos 37'; Viljamaa 68'

Fredrikstad Stadion, Fredrikstad
Referee: Rita Vehapi (Kosovo)
23 October 2024
18:00

Norway	7–0	Belarus
Preus 27', 66'; Sødal 50', 60', 79'; Enger 55'; Herseth 90+3'	Report

Fredrikstad Stadion, Fredrikstad
Referee: Filipa Pereira Cunha (Portugal)

26 October 2024
16:00

Norway	3–0	Greece
Halbmayr 3'; Flø 41', 87'	Report

Sarpsborg Stadion, Sarpsborg
Referee: Louise Thompson (Northern Ireland)
26 October 2024
16:00

Finland	2–0	Belarus
Viljamaa 10'; Sipilä 45+1'	Report

Fredrikstad Stadion, Fredrikstad
Referee: Rita Vehapi (Kosovo)

29 October 2024
16:00

Finland	0–4	Norway
	Report	Gamst 10'; Sødal 13', 53', 74'

Sarpsborg Stadion, Sarpsborg
Referee: Louise Thompson (Northern Ireland)
29 October 2024
16:00

Belarus	0–3	Greece
	Report	Mara 10', 32'; Guzovskaya 48' (o.g.)

Fredrikstad Stadion, Fredrikstad
Referee: Filipa Pereira Cunha (Portugal)

=== League B ===
Times are CET/CEST, as listed by UEFA (local times, if different, are in parentheses).

==== Group B1 ====
Pos	Team	Pld	W	D	L	GF	GA	GD	Pts	Promotion or transfer
1	Slovakia (H)	3	3	0	0	8	0	+8	9	Promoted to Round 2 League A
2	Georgia	3	2	0	1	7	5	+2	6	Promoted to Round 2 League A
3	Latvia	3	1	0	2	6	9	−3	3	Transferred to Round 2 League B
4	Montenegro	3	0	0	3	2	9	−7	0	Transferred to Round 2 League B

Source: www.sofascore.com
Rules for classification: Tiebreakers
(H) Hosts
5 November 2024
12:00

Latvia	4–1	Montenegro
Haritonova 11'; Zviedre 43', 45+1'; Dzene 80'	Report	Spahić 86'

Spiš Aréna, Spišská Nová Ves
Referee: Marisca Overtoom (The Netherlands)
5 November 2024
16:00

Slovakia	2–0	Georgia
Havalec 2'; Melicharek 65'	Report

NTC Poprad, Poprad
Referee: Milica Milovanovic (Serbia)

8 November 2024
12:00

Montenegro	1–2	Georgia
Balevic 38'	Report	Khelashvili 56'; Kaloiani 90+5' (pen.)

Spiš Aréna, Spišská Nová Ves
Referee: Marisca Overtoom (The Netherlands)
8 November 2024
16:00

Slovakia	3–0	Latvia
Kerešová 61'; Bučková 64'; Suchoňová 89'	Report

NTC Poprad, Poprad
Referee: Lovisa Johansson (Sweden)

11 November 2024
12:00

Montenegro	0–3	Slovakia
	Report	Suchoňová 3'; Kerešová 19'; Šoltysová 59'

NTC Poprad, Poprad
Referee: Lovisa Johansson (Sweden)
11 November 2024
12:00

Georgia	5–2	Latvia
Tsikaridze 11', 45+2', 55', 90+2', 90+3'	Report	S. Zālīte 71'; Artemjeva 84'

Spiš Aréna, Spišská Nová Ves
Referee: Milica Milovanovic (Serbia)

==== Group B2 ====
Pos	Team	Pld	W	D	L	GF	GA	GD	Pts	Promotion or transfer
1	Ukraine	3	3	0	0	18	0	+18	9	Promoted to Round 2 League A
2	Romania	3	2	0	1	7	5	+2	6	Transferred to Round 2 League B
3	Moldova	3	1	0	2	3	9	−6	3	Transferred to Round 2 League B
4	Malta (H)	3	0	0	3	2	16	−14	0	Transferred to Round 2 League B

Source: www.sofascore.com
Rules for classification: Tiebreakers
(H) Hosts
13 November 2024
11:00

Malta	1–4	Romania
Axiak 13'	Report	Fulop 6'; Abela 14' (o.g.); Bogos 36'; Bortea 90+3'

Centenary Stadium, Ta' Qali
Referee: Stacey Pearson (England)
13 November 2024
14:30

Ukraine	5–0	Moldova
Kolodii 62', 76'; Avramenko 70'; Lespukh 75', 81'	Report

Centenary Stadium, Ta' Qali
Referee: Teona Sturua (Georgia)

16 November 2024
11:00

Ukraine	10–0	Malta
Kuptsova 6'; Ivanchenko 28'; Lespukh 30', 32'; Kolodii 43', 45'; Savkina 53', 64'; Konovalova 66'; Hladun 90+1'	Report

Centenary Stadium, Ta' Qali
Referee: Andromachi Tsiofliki (Greece)
16 November 2024
14:30

Romania	3–1	Moldova
Lionte 49' (pen.); Olah 56'; Fulop 81'	Report	Rubanovici 88'

Centenary Stadium, Ta' Qali
Referee: Stacey Pearson (England)

19 November 2024
11:00

Moldova	2–1	Malta
Borșci 63'; Belcencova 68'	Report	Axiak 33'

Centenary Stadium, Ta' Qali
Referee: Teona Sturua (Georgia)
19 November 2024
14:30

Romania	0–3	Ukraine
	Report	Kolodii 7'; Lespukh 45+1'; Bogos 53' (o.g.)

Centenary Stadium, Ta' Qali
Referee: Andromachi Tsiofliki (Greece)

==== Group B3 ====
Pos	Team	Pld	W	D	L	GF	GA	GD	Pts	Promotion or transfer
1	Hungary (H)	3	2	1	0	12	2	+10	7	Promoted to Round 2 League A
2	North Macedonia	3	1	2	0	4	3	+1	5	Transferred to Round 2 League B
3	Lithuania	3	1	1	1	2	4	−2	4	Transferred to Round 2 League B
4	Andorra	3	0	0	3	2	11	−9	0	Transferred to Round 2 League B

Source: www.sofascore.com
Rules for classification: Tiebreakers
(H) Hosts
2 November 2024
13:30

Lithuania	1–1	North Macedonia
Blaževičūtė 5'	Report	Grozdanova 13'

Globall Football Park, Telki
Referee: Sofiya Prychyna (Ukraine)
2 November 2024
16:00

Hungary	8–1	Andorra
Cañete 12' (o.g.); Pethe 29'; Wolff 41'; Gégény 49', 77'; Horváth 52'; Alasz 63' (pen.); Tóth 81'	Report	Pernia 40'

Globall Football Park, Telki
Referee: Tjaša Misja (Slovenia)

5 November 2024
13:30

North Macedonia	2–1	Andorra
Nakova 55'; Popeski 65'	Report	Ber 33'

Globall Football Park, Telki
Referee: Sofiya Prychyna (Ukraine)
5 November 2024
16:00

Hungary	3–0	Lithuania
Gégény 7', 69'; Horváth 53'	Report

Globall Football Park, Telki
Referee: Fatemeh Zangeneh (Norway)

8 November 2024
16:00

North Macedonia	1–1	Hungary
Popeski 83'	Report	Gégény 39'

Globall Football Park, Telki
Referee: Fatemeh Zangeneh (Norway)
8 November 2024
16:00

Andorra	0–1	Lithuania
	Report	Blaževičūtė 80'

Globall Football Park, Telki
Referee: Tjaša Misja (Slovenia)

==== Group B4 ====
Pos	Team	Pld	W	D	L	GF	GA	GD	Pts	Promotion or transfer
1	Kosovo	2	1	1	0	4	2	+2	4	Promoted to Round 2 League A
2	Albania (H)	2	1	0	1	3	4	−1	3	Transferred to Round 2 League B
3	Israel	2	0	1	1	2	3	−1	1	Transferred to Round 2 League B

Source: www.sofascore.com
Rules for classification: Tiebreakers
(H) Hosts
30 October 2024
14:00

Albania	1–3	Kosovo
Luari 88'	Report	Albonita 29' (pen.); Sinani 41'; Asllanaj 79'

Elbasan Arena, Elbasan
Referee: Ugne Šmitaite (Lithuania)

2 November 2024
11:30

Kosovo	1–1	Israel
Maqastena 73'	Report	Bokobza 89'

Elbasan Arena, Elbasan
Referee: Sofik Torosyan (Armenia)

5 November 2024
14:00

Israel	1–2	Albania
Cohen 90+3'	Report	Luari 27'; Mehmetaj 90+7'

Elbasan Arena, Elbasan
Referee: Joanna Vassallo (Malta)

==== Group B5 ====
Pos	Team	Pld	W	D	L	GF	GA	GD	Pts	Promotion or transfer
1	Serbia	2	2	0	0	13	1	+12	6	Promoted to Round 2 League A
2	Luxembourg (H)	2	1	0	1	4	3	+1	3	Transferred to Round 2 League B
3	Azerbaijan	2	0	0	2	0	13	−13	0	Transferred to Round 2 League B

Source: www.sofascore.com
Rules for classification: Tiebreakers
(H) Hosts
27 October 2024
13:30

Luxembourg	1–3	Serbia
Morvilli 29'	Report	Cenanovic 43'; Sinanović 83'; Mitić 90+7'

Municipal Stadium, Bettembourg
Referee: Eirini Pingiou (Greece)

30 October 2024
18:00

Serbia	10–0	Azerbaijan
Mitić 7'; Petrovic 18'; Cenanovic 25'; Miladinovic 38'; Sinanović 39'; Lukić 45+2'; Todorović 57', 61', 90', 90+4'	Report

Municipal Stadium, Bettembourg
Referee: Charlotte Carpenter (Wales)

2 November 2024
16:00

Azerbaijan	0–3	Luxembourg
	Report	Dietrich 14'; Morvilli 33'; Conte 38'

Municipal Stadium, Bettembourg
Referee: Mzevinari Sharashanidze (Georgia)

==== Group B6 ====
Pos	Team	Pld	W	D	L	GF	GA	GD	Pts	Promotion or transfer
1	Sweden (H)	2	2	0	0	23	1	+22	6	Promoted to Round 2 League A
2	Estonia	2	1	0	1	6	12	−6	3	Transferred to Round 2 League B
3	Kazakhstan	2	0	0	2	1	17	−16	0	Transferred to Round 2 League B

Source: www.sofascore.com
Rules for classification: Tiebreakers
(H) Hosts
23 October 2024
18:30

Sweden	12–0	Kazakhstan
Selin 4'; Sjöström 11', 24' (pen.), 58', 73', 75'; Widén 15', 82', 84'; Ahnberg 19'; Welin 67'; Krasniqi 71'	Report

Borås Arena, Borås
Referee: Oxana Cruc (Moldova)

26 October 2024
15:00

Kazakhstan	1–5	Estonia
Muratzhan 66'	Report	Kala 19'; Väärsi 30', 71'; Ränk 80'; Matson 90'

Borås Arena, Borås
Referee: Melek Dakan (Türkiye)

29 October 2024
18:30

Estonia	1–11	Sweden
Väärsi 18'	Report	Widén 21', 29', 81'; Sjöström 24', 67' (pen.), 68'; Welin 41', 45', 51'; Peterson 65'; Selin 78'

Borås Arena, Borås
Referee: Kathrin Huber (Austria)

==== Ranking of second-placed teams ====
To determine the best runner-up team, only the results of the runner-up teams against the first- and third-placed teams in their group were taken into account (Regulations Article 18.01).

Pos	Grp	Team	Pld	W	D	L	GF	GA	GD	Pts	Promotion
1	B1	Georgia	2	1	0	1	5	4	+1	3	Promoted to Round 2 League A
2	B5	Luxembourg	2	1	0	1	4	3	+1	3	
3	B2	Romania	2	1	0	1	3	4	−1	3 (Note: Ranked on disciplinary points: Romania: –3, Albania: –9)	
4	B4	Albania	2	1	0	1	3	4	−1	3	
5	B6	Estonia	2	1	0	1	6	12	−6	3	
6	B3	North Macedonia	2	0	2	0	2	2	0	2	

Source: UEFA
Rules for classification: 1) points; 2) goal difference; 3) goals scored; 4) disciplinary points; 5) position in the applicable rankings.

== Round 2 ==
=== Draw ===
The draw for the Round 2 was held on 6 December 2024, at the UEFA headquarters in Nyon, Switzerland.

The 49 participating teams were split into two Leagues (28 in League A, 21 in League B) according to their final group standings of Round 1 (Regulations Article 15.01). To determine this ranking, the following criteria were followed:

1. higher position in the following classification:
  1. Round 1 League A group winners
  2. Round 1 League A group runners-up
  3. Round 1 League A third-placed teams
  4. Teams promoted from Round 1 League B
  5. Teams relegated from Round 1 League A
  6. Round 1 League B runners-up
  7. Round 1 League B third-placed teams
  8. Round 1 League B fourth-placed teams
2. higher number of points in all mini-tournament matches;
3. superior goal difference in all mini-tournament matches;
4. higher number of goals scored in all mini-tournament matches;
5. lower disciplinary points (red card = 3 points, yellow card = 1 point, expulsion for two yellow cards in one match = 3 points);
6. higher position in the 2023–24 Round 2 league rankings.

Within each League, the teams were allocated to four drawing pots (seven teams per pot in League A; six teams in Pots 1 to 3 and three teams in Pot 4 in League B). Teams in the same pot would be drawn into different groups, with League A consisting of seven groups of four teams, and League B consisting of three groups of four and three groups of three teams.

Teams entering League A

The 21 teams of Round 1 League A (top three teams in each group) and the seven teams of Round 1 League B (six group winners and the best runner-up) were drawn into seven groups of four teams. The Round 1 League A group winners were automatically seeded into Pot 1, the second- and third-placed teams into Pots 2 and 3, respectively. The Round 1 League B teams were seeded into Pot 4; their matches against the fourth-placed teams in their group did not count towards this ranking (Regulations Article 15.01).

Pos	Gr (Rk)	Team	Pld	W	D	L	GF	GA	GD	Pts	Seeding
1	A7 (1)	Norway	3	3	0	0	14	0	+14	9	Pot 1
2	A1 (1)	Switzerland	3	3	0	0	13	1	+12	9	Pot 1
3	A4 (1)	Scotland	3	3	0	0	5	1	+4	9	Pot 1
4	A2 (1)	Germany	3	3	0	0	5	2	+3	9	Pot 1
5	A3 (1)	England	3	2	1	0	11	2	+9	7	Pot 1
6	A6 (1)	Spain	3	2	1	0	10	4	+6	7	Pot 1
7	A5 (1)	Italy	3	2	0	1	4	2	+2	6	Pot 1
8	A1 (2)	Portugal	3	2	0	1	16	6	+10	6	Pot 2
9	A3 (2)	Czech Republic	3	2	0	1	12	4	+8	6	Pot 2
10	A4 (2)	Poland	3	2	0	1	7	2	+5	6	Pot 2
11	A2 (2)	Belgium	3	2	0	1	6	2	+4	6	Pot 2
12	A7 (2)	Finland	3	2	0	1	5	4	+1	6	Pot 2
13	A6 (2)	Austria	3	1	2	0	8	4	+4	5	Pot 2
14	A5 (2)	France	3	1	2	0	3	1	+2	5	Pot 2
15	A3 (3)	Netherlands	3	1	1	1	11	5	+6	4	Pot 3
16	A5 (3)	Croatia	3	1	1	1	3	3	0	4	Pot 3
17	A6 (3)	Denmark	3	1	1	1	4	6	−2	4	Pot 3
18	A4 (3)	Iceland	3	1	0	2	3	3	0	3	Pot 3
19	A2 (3)	Turkey	3	1	0	2	3	5	−2	3	Pot 3
20	A7 (3)	Greece	3	1	0	2	3	6	−3	3	Pot 3
21	A1 (3)	Wales	3	1	0	2	4	9	−5	3	Pot 3
22	B6 (1)	Sweden	2	2	0	0	23	1	+22	6	Pot 4
23	B5 (1)	Serbia	2	2	0	0	13	1	+12	6	Pot 4
24	B2 (1)	Ukraine	2	2	0	0	8	0	+8	6	Pot 4
25	B1 (1)	Slovakia	2	2	0	0	5	0	+5	6	Pot 4
26	B3 (1)	Hungary	2	1	1	0	4	1	+3	4	Pot 4
27	B4 (1)	Kosovo	2	1	1	0	4	2	+2	4	Pot 4
28	B1 (2)	Georgia	2	1	0	1	5	4	+1	3	Pot 4

Source: UEFA
Rules for classification: 1) round 1 position; 2) points; 3) goal difference; 4) goals scored; 5) disciplinary points; 6) position in the applicable rankings.

Teams entering League B

The seven fourth-placed teams of Round 1 League A and the 14 non-promoted teams of Round 1 League B were drawn into six groups of three or four teams. The best six fourth-placed teams of Round 1 League A were automatically seeded into Pot 1. The seventh fourth-placed team of Round 1 League A and the runner-up teams of Round 1 League B were seeded into Pot 2. The third- and fourth-placed teams of Round 1 League B were seeded into Pots 3 and 4, respectively. The matches of the second- and third-placed teams of Round 1 League B against the fourth-placed teams in their group did not count towards this ranking (Regulations Article 15.01).

Pos	Gr (Rk)	Team	Pld	W	D	L	GF	GA	GD	Pts	Seeding
1	A5 (4)	Bulgaria	3	0	1	2	0	4	−4	1	Pot 1
2	A2 (4)	Bosnia and Herzegovina	3	0	0	3	0	5	−5	0	Pot 1
3	A6 (4)	Republic of Ireland	3	0	0	3	3	11	−8	0	Pot 1
4	A4 (4)	Northern Ireland	3	0	0	3	0	9	−9	0	Pot 1
5	A7 (4)	Belarus	3	0	0	3	0	12	−12	0	Pot 1
6	A1 (4)	Slovenia	3	0	0	3	1	18	−17	0	Pot 1
7	A3 (4)	Faroe Islands	3	0	0	3	0	23	−23	0	Pot 2
8	B5 (2)	Luxembourg	2	1	0	1	4	3	+1	3	Pot 2
9	B3 (2)	North Macedonia	2	0	2	0	2	2	0	2	Pot 2
10	B2 (2)	Romania	2	1	0	1	3	4	−1	3 (Note: Ranked on disciplinary points: Romania: –3, Albania: –9)	Pot 2
11	B4 (2)	Albania	2	1	0	1	3	4	−1	3	Pot 2
12	B6 (2)	Estonia	2	1	0	1	6	12	−6	3	Pot 2
13	B4 (3)	Israel	2	0	1	1	2	3	−1	1	Pot 3
14	B3 (3)	Lithuania	2	0	1	1	1	4	−3	1	Pot 3
15	B1 (3)	Latvia	2	0	0	2	2	8	−6	0	Pot 3
16	B2 (3)	Moldova	2	0	0	2	1	8	−7	0	Pot 3
17	B5 (3)	Azerbaijan	2	0	0	2	0	13	−13	0	Pot 3
18	B6 (3)	Kazakhstan	2	0	0	2	1	17	−16	0	Pot 3
19	B1 (4)	Montenegro	3	0	0	3	2	9	−7	0	Pot 4
20	B3 (4)	Andorra	3	0	0	3	2	11	−9	0	Pot 4
21	B2 (4)	Malta	3	0	0	3	2	16	−14	0	Pot 4

Source: UEFA
Rules for classification: 1) round 1 position; 2) points; 3) goal difference; 4) goals scored; 5) disciplinary points; 6) position in the applicable rankings.

=== League A ===
Times are CET (UTC+1) as listed by UEFA (local times, if different, are in parentheses).

==== Group A1 ====
Pos	Team	Pld	W	D	L	GF	GA	GD	Pts	Qualification or relegation
1	Spain (H)	3	3	0	0	7	2	+5	9	Qualified for the final tournament
2	Belgium	3	2	0	1	6	6	0	6	
3	Ukraine	3	1	0	2	3	5	−2	3	
4	Iceland	3	0	0	3	3	6	−3	0	Relegated to League B for the next season's qualification

Source: www.sofascore.com
Rules for classification: Tiebreakers
(H) Hosts
8 March 2025
12:00

Spain	2–1	Ukraine
Navarro 45+1'; Calo 67'	Report	Vorobei 90+2'

Pinatar Arena, Murcia
Referee: Abbie Hendry (Scotland)
8 March 2025
18:00

Iceland	2–3	Belgium
Brynjarsdóttir 18'; Pálmadóttir 89'	Report	Reynebeau 21'; Vanbellingen 37'; Bomie 74'

Pinatar Arena, Murcia
Referee: Tjaša Misja (Slovenia)

11 March 2025
12:00

Spain	1–0	Iceland
Barrios 66'	Report

Pinatar Arena, Murcia
Referee: Frederikke Lydia Søkjær (Denmark)
11 March 2025
18:00

Belgium	2–0	Ukraine
Reynebeau 4'; Hens 68'	Report

Pinatar Arena, Murcia
Referee: Tjaša Misja (Slovenia)

14 March 2025
15:00

Belgium	1–4	Spain
Bomie 56'	Report	Navarro 1', 65', 69' (pen.), 89'

Pinatar Arena, Murcia
Referee: Frederikke Lydia Søkjær (Denmark)
14 March 2025
15:00

Ukraine	2–1	Iceland
Lespukh 61'; Kolodii 87'	Report	Jóhannesdóttir 24'

Estadio Nueva Condomina, Murcia
Referee: Abbie Hendry (Scotland)

==== Group A2 ====
Pos	Team	Pld	W	D	L	GF	GA	GD	Pts	Qualification or relegation
1	France (H)	3	3	0	0	8	1	+7	9	Qualified for the final tournament
2	Scotland	3	1	1	1	5	4	+1	4	
3	Slovakia	3	1	1	1	3	4	−1	4	
4	Wales	3	0	0	3	0	7	−7	0	Relegated to League B for the next season's qualification

Source: www.sofascore.com
Rules for classification: Tiebreakers
(H) Hosts
5 March 2025
14:30

Wales	0–4	France
	Report	Belaid 31'; Morissaint 75', 90+9'; Laboucarie 76'

Stade Jacques Rimbault, Bourges
Referee: Eirini Pingiou (Greece)
5 March 2025
16:30

Scotland	2–2	Slovakia
Sharkey 14'; Burn 77'	Report	Havalec 34'; Melicharek 90'

Stade Henri Luquet, Saint-Germain-du-Puy
Referee: Hanna Laajanen (Sweden)

8 March 2025
14:30

France	2–0	Slovakia
Belaid 41'; Tordajiová 62' (o.g.)	Report

Stade Jacques Rimbault, Bourges
Referee: Eirini Pingiou (Greece)
8 March 2025
16:30

Scotland	2–0	Wales
Sharkey 56'; Gray 90+5'	Report

Stade Henri Luquet, Saint-Germain-du-Puy
Referee: Vanja Jankovic (Slovenia)

11 March 2025
16:00

France	2–1	Scotland
Adedini 6'; Marmillot 89'	Report	Bardet 77' (o.g.)

Stade Jacques Rimbault, Bourges
Referee: Vanja Jankovic (Slovenia)
11 March 2025
16:00

Slovakia	1–0	Wales
Šoltysová 12'	Report

Stade Henri Luquet, Saint-Germain-du-Puy
Referee: Hanna Laajanen (Sweden)

==== Group A3 ====
Pos	Team	Pld	W	D	L	GF	GA	GD	Pts	Qualification or relegation
1	Italy	3	2	1	0	6	0	+6	7	Qualified for the final tournament
2	Czech Republic	3	2	0	1	8	1	+7	6	
3	Croatia (H)	3	1	1	1	8	1	+7	4	
4	Georgia	3	0	0	3	0	20	−20	0	Relegated to League B for the next season's qualification

Source: www.sofascore.com
Rules for classification: Tiebreakers
(H) Hosts
8 March 2025
12:00

Croatia	0–1	Czech Republic
	Report	Veselá 1'

Gradski Stadion, Hrvace
Referee: Emilie Torkelsen (Norway)
8 March 2025
14:30

Italy	5–0	Georgia
Giudici 3'; Galli 21', 79'; Bressan 34'; Gianfico 58'	Report

Stadion Hrvatski vitezovi, Dugopolje
Referee: Cansu Tryak (Türkiye)

11 March 2025
12:00

Italy	0–0	Croatia
	Report

Gradski Stadion, Hrvace
Referee: Jana Van Laere (Belgium)
11 March 2025
14:30

Czech Republic	7–0	Georgia
Šafářová 28', 45+2'; Csizmaziová 47'; Kučerová 61'; Rancová 69' (pen.); Najvarová 83'; Stejskalová 89'	Report

Stadion Hrvatski vitezovi, Dugopolje
Referee: Emilie Torkelsen (Norway)

14 March 2025
12:00

Czech Republic	0–1	Italy
	Report	Copelli 23'

Stadion Hrvatski vitezovi, Dugopolje
Referee: Jana Van Laere (Belgium)
14 March 2025
12:00

Georgia	0–8	Croatia
	Report	Došen 23'; Grgić 27', 30', 45+2', 56'; Akrap 59' (pen.); Kalaš 68'; Šalić 74'

Gradski Stadion, Hrvace
Referee: Cansu Tryak (Türkiye)

==== Group A4 ====
Pos	Team	Pld	W	D	L	GF	GA	GD	Pts	Qualification or relegation
1	Poland	3	3	0	0	9	1	+8	9	Qualified for the final tournament
2	Switzerland	3	2	0	1	3	2	+1	6	
3	Hungary	3	1	0	2	6	6	0	3	
4	Turkey (H)	3	0	0	3	2	11	−9	0	Relegated to League B for the next season's qualification

Source: www.sofascore.com
Rules for classification: Tiebreakers
(H) Hosts
11 March 2025
10:00

Switzerland	2–0	Hungary
Edelmann 12'; Alioth 39'	Report

Arslan Zeki Demirci Sports Complex, Manavgat
Referee: Satu Miettunen (Finland)
11 March 2025
13:00

Turkey	0–5	Poland
	Report	Ostrowska 25'; Guzenda 62'; Skrzypczak 64'; Zgrzeba 81'; Sikora 84'

Arslan Zeki Demirci Sports Complex, Manavgat
Referee: Roxana Recorean (Romania)

14 March 2025
10:00

Poland	2–1	Hungary
Burzan 38'; Sikora 52'	Report	Turi 39'

Arslan Zeki Demirci Sports Complex, Manavgat
Referee: Roxana Recorean (Romania)
14 March 2025
13:00

Switzerland	1–0	Turkey
Looser 9'	Report

Arslan Zeki Demirci Sports Complex, Manavgat
Referee: Martina Molinaro (Italy)

17 March 2025
13:00

Poland	2–0	Switzerland
Świrska 72'; Sikora 85'	Report

Arslan Zeki Demirci Sports Complex, Manavgat
Referee: Martina Molinaro (Italy)
17 March 2025
13:00

Hungary	5–2	Turkey
Turi 13', 70'; Pethe 36', 45+4'; Horváth 75'	Report	Balci 14'; Şengül 18'

Arslan Zeki Demirci Sports Complex, Manavgat
Referee: Satu Miettunen (Finland)

==== Group A5 ====
Pos	Team	Pld	W	D	L	GF	GA	GD	Pts	Qualification or relegation
1	Netherlands	3	3	0	0	13	4	+9	9	Qualified for the final tournament
2	Finland (H)	3	1	1	1	5	7	−2	4	
3	England	3	1	0	2	5	9	−4	3	
4	Sweden	3	0	1	2	7	10	−3	1	Relegated to League B for the next season's qualification

Source: www.sofascore.com
Rules for classification: Tiebreakers
(H) Hosts
14 March 2025
12:30

Netherlands	4–0	Finland
Derks 13'; Renfurm 45+2' (pen.); Pennock 78'; Dap 85'	Report

Veritas Stadion, Turku
Referee: Tatyana Sorokopudova (Kazakhstan)
14 March 2025
17:30

England	3–2	Sweden
Bailey 18' (pen.); Hirons 36'; Jones 54'	Report	Welin 4'; Widén 90+3'

Veritas Stadion, Turku
Referee: Anna Adamska (Poland)

17 March 2025
12:30

England	1–4	Netherlands
Lewis 79'	Report	Koster 27'; Van Hunnik 29'; Van Der Vliet 56'; Derks 64'

Veritas Stadion, Turku
Referee: María Eugenia Gil Soriano (Spain)
17 March 2025
17:30

Finland	2–2	Sweden
Orava 20'; Hakola 78'	Report	Sjöström 33'; Krasniqi 36'

Veritas Stadion, Turku
Referee: Tatyana Sorokopudova (Kazakhstan)

20 March 2025
12:30

Finland	3–1	England
Cowley 35' (o.g.); Xiang 61'; Orava 68'	Report	Pierre 87'

Veritas Stadion, Turku
Referee: María Eugenia Gil Soriano (Spain)
20 March 2025
12:30

Sweden	3–5	Netherlands
Josefsson 48'; Migas 79'; Krasniqi 88'	Report	van Hunnik 15', 43'; El Belati 61', 74'; Meekelenkamp 85'

Salon Urheilupuisto, Salo
Referee: Anna Adamska (Poland)

==== Group A6 ====
Pos	Team	Pld	W	D	L	GF	GA	GD	Pts	Qualification or relegation
1	Norway (H)	3	3	0	0	7	1	+6	9	Qualified for the final tournament
2	Portugal	3	2	0	1	7	1	+6	6	
3	Serbia	3	1	0	2	2	9	−7	3	
4	Greece	3	0	0	3	1	6	−5	0	Relegated to League B for the next season's qualification

Source: www.sofascore.com
Rules for classification: Tiebreakers
(H) Hosts
12 March 2025
12:00

Greece	0–2	Portugal
	Report	Carreira 2'; Rakipi 50' (o.g.)

Sandnes Ulf Arena, Sandnes
Referee: Ugne Šmitaite (Lithuania)
12 March 2025
17:00

Norway	4–0	Serbia
Enger 24'; Preus 35'; Berg 42'; Senior-Hårvik 82'	Report

Sandnes Ulf Arena, Sandnes
Referee: Laura Mauricio (Switzerland)

15 March 2025
12:00

Portugal	5–0	Serbia
Carreira 12'; Tristão 30', 53'; Maia 36'; Vieira 56'	Report

Sandnes Ulf Arena, Sandnes
Referee: Ugne Šmitaite (Lithuania)
15 March 2025
17:00

Norway	2–1	Greece
Nygård 57' (pen.); Kolbjørnsen 66'	Report	Velissaridou 21'

Sandnes Ulf Arena, Sandnes
Referee: Audrey Gerbel (France)

18 March 2025
17:00

Portugal	0–1	Norway
	Report	Preus 29'

Sandnes Ulf Arena, Sandnes
Referee: Audrey Gerbel (France)
18 March 2025
17:00

Serbia	2–0	Greece
Topić 53'; Mitić 56'	Report

Viking Stadion, Stavanger
Referee: Laura Mauricio (Switzerland)

==== Group A7 ====
Pos	Team	Pld	W	D	L	GF	GA	GD	Pts	Qualification or relegation
1	Austria	3	2	1	0	8	0	+8	7	Qualified for the final tournament
2	Denmark	3	2	0	1	8	4	+4	6	
3	Germany (H)	3	1	1	1	10	1	+9	4	
4	Kosovo	3	0	0	3	0	21	−21	0	Relegated to League B for the next season's qualification

Source: www.sofascore.com
Rules for classification: Tiebreakers
(H) Hosts
17 March 2025
12:00

Germany	10–0	Kosovo
Wrede 4', 43' (pen.); Wrigge 13', 25'; Schick 30', 34'; Gmeineder 37'; Szaraz 48'; Arici 72'; Bäcker 86'	Report

DFB-Campus, Frankfurt
Referee: Elisabet Calvo Valentín (Spain)
17 March 2025
16:00

Denmark	0–4	Austria
	Report	Pamminger 39', 43', 70'; Lueger 46'

Sportpark Kelsterbach, Kelsterbach
Referee: Karoline Marie Jensen (Norway)

20 March 2025
12:00

Germany	0–1	Denmark
	Report	Strauss 72' (pen.)

DFB-Campus, Frankfurt
Referee: Ioanna Allayiotou (Cyprus)
20 March 2025
16:00

Austria	4–0	Kosovo
Szuchy 10'; Lueger 31'; Osl 87' (pen.), 92'	Report

DFB-Campus, Frankfurt
Referee: Karoline Marie Jensen (Norway)

23 March 2025
15:00

Austria	0–0	Germany
	Report

DFB-Campus, Frankfurt
Referee: Ioanna Allayiotou (Cyprus)
23 March 2025
15:00

Kosovo	0–7	Denmark
	Report	Karstensen 8'; Jørgensen 22'; Mott 49'; Strauss 51', 90+3'; Asllanaj 55' (o.g.); Lundberg 58' (pen.)

Sportpark Kelsterbach, Kelsterbach
Referee: Elisabet Calvo Valentín (Spain)

=== League B ===
Times are CET (UTC+1) as listed by UEFA (local times, if different, are in parentheses).

==== Group B1 ====
Pos	Team	Pld	W	D	L	GF	GA	GD	Pts	Promotion
1	Montenegro	3	2	1	0	6	3	+3	7	Promoted to League A for the next season's qualification
2	Estonia	3	0	3	0	5	5	0	3	
3	Northern Ireland (H)	3	0	2	1	5	6	−1	2	
4	Kazakhstan	3	0	2	1	5	7	−2	2	

Source: www.sofascore.com
Rules for classification: Tiebreakers
(H) Hosts
17 March 2025
13:30

Kazakhstan	2–2	Estonia
Akhmetzhan 21'; Yermagambetova 31'	Report	Gross 8'; J. Južaninova 52'

Seaview, Belfast
Referee: Briet Bragadottir (Iceland)
17 March 2025
18:30

Northern Ireland	1–2	Montenegro
McGuinness 6'	Report	Cebalovic 4'; Merdović 21'

Seaview, Belfast
Referee: Sapir Gaya Berman (Israel)

20 March 2025
13:30

Estonia	1–1	Montenegro
Pihlak 51'	Report	Damjanovic 12'

Seaview, Belfast
Referee: Briet Bragadottir (Iceland)
20 March 2025
17:00

Northern Ireland	2–2	Kazakhstan
McDermott 13'; Havern 25'	Report	Yermagambetova 45+4'; Zholbolat 71' (pen.)

Inver Park, Larne
Referee: Jeļena Jermolajeva (Latvia)

23 March 2025
18:30

Estonia	2–2	Northern Ireland
Kristiansen 48'; A. Južaninova 90+1'	Report	Smyth 37', 80'

Seaview, Belfast
Referee: Jeļena Jermolajeva (Latvia)
23 March 2025
18:30

Montenegro	3–1	Kazakhstan
Cebalovic 36'; Balevic 51'; Vlahovic 57'	Report	Muratzhan 80'

Inver Park, Larne
Referee: Sapir Gaya Berman (Israel)

==== Group B2 ====
Pos	Team	Pld	W	D	L	GF	GA	GD	Pts	Promotion
1	Bulgaria	3	2	0	1	11	3	+8	6 (Note: Ranked on head-to-head points: Bulgaria: 3, Luxembourg: 0)	Promoted to League A for the next season's qualification
2	Luxembourg	3	2	0	1	10	4	+6	6	
3	Malta	3	1	0	2	2	10	−8	3 (Note: Ranked on head-to-head points: Malta: 3, Azerbaijan: 0)	
4	Azerbaijan (H)	3	1	0	2	3	9	−6	3	

Source: www.sofascore.com
Rules for classification: Tiebreakers
(H) Hosts
Notes:
12 March 2025
08:00

Bulgaria	5–0	Malta
Boneva 15'; Ravnachka 22', 55'; Halyanova 64'; Filipova 76'	Report

Bayil Stadium, Baku
Referee: Filipa Pereira Cunha (Portugal)
12 March 2025
13:00

Azerbaijan	0–5	Luxembourg
	Report	Dietrich 7'; Magalhães 53'; Daffix 63'; Kirps 89'; Palazzo 90'

Bayil Stadium, Baku
Referee: Eglantina Pjetrushaj (Albania)

15 March 2025
08:00

Luxembourg	5–0	Malta
Dietrich 12'; Morvilli 43'; Magalhães 59', 83'; Rosenbrock 87'	Report

Bayil Stadium, Baku
Referee: Eglantina Pjetrushaj (Albania)
15 March 2025
13:00

Bulgaria	2–3	Azerbaijan
Baliova 45+2'; Ravnachka 90+1'	Report	Asadova 13', 74'; Salamzada 90+3'

Bayil Stadium, Baku
Referee: Mzevinari Sharashanidze (Georgia)

18 March 2025
10:00

Luxembourg	0–4	Bulgaria
	Report	Boneva 11'; Mihaleva 66'; Koeva 81', 87'

Bine Stadium, Baku
Referee: Mzevinari Sharashanidze (Georgia)
18 March 2025
10:00

Malta	2–0	Azerbaijan
Naudi 50', 53'	Report

Bayil Stadium, Baku
Referee: Filipa Pereira Cunha (Portugal)

==== Group B3 ====
Pos	Team	Pld	W	D	L	GF	GA	GD	Pts	Promotion
1	Belarus	3	2	1	0	11	2	+9	7	Promoted to League A for the next season's qualification
2	Andorra (H)	3	2	1	0	2	0	+2	7	Promoted to League A for the next season's qualification
3	Israel	3	1	0	2	5	5	0	3	
4	Albania	3	0	0	3	1	12	−11	0	

Source: www.sofascore.com
Rules for classification: Tiebreakers
(H) Hosts
4 March 2025
11:00

Israel	3–1	Albania
Zvi 23'; E. Fabian 90+1', 90+5'	Report	Reci 67'

Centre d’Entrenament FAF, Andorra la Vella
Referee: Reelika Turi (Estonia)
4 March 2025
15:00

Belarus	0–0	Andorra
	Report

Centre d’Entrenament FAF, Andorra la Vella
Referee: Andromachi Tsiofliki (Greece)

7 March 2025
11:00

Belarus	3–2	Israel
Katsynel 9'; Vasiliuk 40' (pen.); Yurchuk 80'	Report	E. Fabian 49'; K. Fabian 75' (pen.)

Centre d’Entrenament FAF, Andorra la Vella
Referee: Oxana Cruc (Moldova)
7 March 2025
15:00

Albania	0–1	Andorra
	Report	Quilez 32' (pen.)

Centre d’Entrenament FAF, Andorra la Vella
Referee: Reelika Turi (Estonia)

10 March 2025
12:00

Albania	0–8	Belarus
	Report	Yurchuk 5'; Butovich 20', 39'; Katsynel 44', 51'; Kupriyanchik 59'; Marchuk 79'; Guzovskaya 90'

Centre d’Entrenament FAF, Andorra la Vella
Referee: Oxana Cruc (Moldova)
10 March 2025
12:00

Andorra	1–0	Israel
Ber 1'	Report

Estadi Nacional, Andorra la Vella
Referee: Andromachi Tsiofliki (Greece)

==== Group B4 ====
Pos	Team	Pld	W	D	L	GF	GA	GD	Pts	Promotion
1	Romania (H)	2	2	0	0	4	0	+4	6	Promoted to League A for the next season's qualification
2	Bosnia and Herzegovina	2	1	0	1	2	2	0	3	
3	Latvia	2	0	0	2	0	4	−4	0	

Source: www.sofascore.com
Rules for classification: Tiebreakers
(H) Hosts
19 February 2025
11:00

Romania	2–0	Latvia
Olah 48'; Bucșa 62'	Report

Football Centre FRF, Buftea
Referee: Marta San Juan (Andorra)

22 February 2025
11:00

Latvia	0–2	Bosnia and Herzegovina
	Report	Hadžihajdarević 24'; Blagojević 80'

Football Centre FRF, Buftea
Referee: Sofik Torosyan (Armenia)

25 February 2025
11:00

Bosnia and Herzegovina	0–2	Romania
	Report	Lionte 45+1' (pen.); Olah 68'

Football Centre FRF, Buftea
Referee: Teona Sturua (Georgia)

==== Group B5 ====
Pos	Team	Pld	W	D	L	GF	GA	GD	Pts	Promotion
1	Republic of Ireland	2	2	0	0	8	5	+3	6	Promoted to League A for the next season's qualification
2	Lithuania (H)	2	1	0	1	5	5	0	3	
3	Faroe Islands	2	0	0	2	7	10	−3	0	

Source: www.sofascore.com
Rules for classification: Tiebreakers
(H) Hosts
9 March 2025
14:00

Lithuania	1–2	Republic of Ireland
Šapaitė 54'	Report	Butler 43', 87' (pen.)

VFA-Hanner stadium, Vilnius
Referee: Lovisa Johansson (Sweden)

12 March 2025
14:00

Republic of Ireland	6–4	Faroe Islands
Breslin 10'; Kelly 17'; Silickaite 20'; Leonard 23'; Mullins 65'; Butler 76'	Report	Benjaminsen 21', 58'; Sjóstein 41'; Hansdóttir 48'

VFA-Hanner stadium, Vilnius
Referee: Vesna Miletic (Bosnia and Herzegovina)

15 March 2025
13:00

Faroe Islands	3–4	Lithuania
Sigurðsson 5', 84'; Benjaminsen 10' (pen.)	Report	Jokubaitytė 52'; Valiukevicius 73'; Kelečiūtė 87'; Šapaitė 90+5' (pen.)

VFA-Hanner stadium, Vilnius
Referee: Kristina Kozoroh (Ukraine)

==== Group B6 ====
Pos	Team	Pld	W	D	L	GF	GA	GD	Pts	Promotion
1	North Macedonia (H)	2	2	0	0	6	0	+6	6	Promoted to League A for the next season's qualification
2	Slovenia	2	1	0	1	2	2	0	3	
3	Moldova	2	0	0	2	1	7	−6	0	

Source: www.sofascore.com
Rules for classification: Tiebreakers
(H) Hosts
6 March 2025
13:00

North Macedonia	5–0	Moldova
Nakova 29', 51', 77'; Popeski 54'; Velichkova 66'	Report

FFM Training Centre, Skopje
Referee: Teona Sturua (Georgia)

9 March 2025
13:00

Moldova	1–2	Slovenia
Mazur 24'	Report	Osolnik 58'; Žagar 86'

FFM Training Centre, Skopje
Referee: Liudmyla Telbukh (Ukraine)

12 March 2025
11:00

Slovenia	0–1	North Macedonia
	Report	Nakova 8'

FFM Training Centre, Skopje
Referee: Joanna Vassallo (Malta)

==== Ranking of second-placed teams ====
To determine the best runner-up team, only the results of the runner-up teams against the first- and third-placed teams in their group were taken into account (Regulations Article 18.01).

Pos	Grp	Team	Pld	W	D	L	GF	GA	GD	Pts	Promotion
1	B3	Andorra	2	1	1	0	1	0	+1	4	Promoted to League A for the next season's qualification
2	B2	Luxembourg	2	1	0	1	5	4	+1	3	
3	B5	Lithuania	2	1	0	1	5	5	0	3	
4	B4	Bosnia and Herzegovina	2	1	0	1	2	2	0	3	
4	B6	Slovenia	2	1	0	1	2	2	0	3	
6	B1	Estonia	2	0	2	0	3	3	0	2	

Source: UEFA
Rules for classification: 1) points; 2) goal difference; 3) goals scored; 4) disciplinary points; 5) position in the applicable rankings.

== Qualified teams ==
Team	Method of qualification	Appearance	Last appearance	Previous best performance
Faroe Islands	Hosts	1st	Debut	
France	Round 2 Group A2 winners	11th	2024 (Fourth place)	Champions (2023)
Spain	Round 2 Group A1 winners	14th	2024 (Champions)	Champions (2010, 2011, 2015, 2018, 2024)
Italy	Round 2 Group A3 winners	4th	2018 (Group stage)	Third place (2014)
Poland	Round 2 Group A4 winners	5th	2024 (Third place)	Champions (2013)
Netherlands	Round 2 Group A5 winners	6th	2022 (Fourth place)	Runners-up (2019)
Norway	Round 2 Group A6 winners	7th	2024 (Group stage)	Fourth place (2009, 2016), Semi-finals (2017)
Austria	Round 2 Group A7 winners	3rd	2019 (Group stage)	Group stage (2014, 2019)

== Goalscorers ==
In the Round 1, there have been 283 goals scored in 69 matches, for an average of 4.1 goals per match (as of 20 November 2024).

In the Round 2, there have been 251 goals scored in 69 matches, for an average of 3.64 goals per match (as of 23 March 2025).

In total, there have been 534 goals scored in 138 matches, for an average of 3.87 goals per match (as of 23 March 2025).

9 goals

- (Sweden) Filippa Sjöström

8 goals

- (Spain) Rosalía Navarro

7 goals

- (Sweden) Filippa Andersson Widén

6 goals

- (Norway) Karna Sæther Sødal
- (Portugal) Eva Carreira
- (Switzerland) Giulia Looser
- (Ukraine) Daria Kolodii
- (Ukraine) Karina Lespukh

5 goals

- (Croatia) Antonela Grgić
- (England) Jessica Anderson
- (Georgia (country)) Anano Tsikaridze
- (Hungary) Petra Gégény
- (Netherlands) Otylia El Belati
- (North Macedonia) Nastasja Nakova
- (Portugal) Carolina Tristão
- (Sweden) Thelma Persson Welin

4 goals

- (Austria) Denise Lueger
- (Austria) Alessia Pamminger
- (Italy) Giulia Galli
- (Netherlands) Rochelity Dap
- (Norway) Marie Moen Preus
- (Poland) Amelia Guzenda
- (Republic of Ireland) Anna Butler
- (Serbia) Lana Todorović

3 goals

- (Austria) Anna Osl
- (Belarus) Diana Katsynel
- (Bulgaria) Katerina-Maria Ravnachka
- (Czech Republic) Diana Šafářová
- (Denmark) Louise Strauss
- (Estonia) Rianna Väärsi
- (Faroe Islands) Sara Benjaminsen
- (France) Léa Morissaint
- (Germany) Zoe Schick
- (Hungary) Petra Horváth
- (Hungary) Olivia Pethe
- (Hungary) Bori Turi
- (Israel) Ella Esther Fabian
- (Luxembourg) Hannah Dietrich
- (Luxembourg) Charlie Jorge Magalhães
- (Luxembourg) Federica Morvilli
- (Netherlands) Sophie Christina Readine Van Hunnik
- (North Macedonia) Kalina Popeski
- (Poland) Julia Sikora
- (Portugal) Matilde Santos
- (Romania) Maria Isabel Olah
- (Serbia) Sara Mitić
- (Sweden) Rona Krasniqi

2 goals

- (Albania) Refjona Luari
- (Andorra) Carla Ber
- (Azerbaijan) Khanım Asadova
- (Belarus) Maryia Butovich
- (Belgium) Chloê van Bellingen
- (Belgium) Paola Tchidjo Bomie
- (Belgium) Marthe Hens
- (Belgium) Clementine Reynebeau
- (Bulgaria) Raya Boneva
- (Bulgaria) Zornitsa Koeva
- (Croatia) Petra Bandula
- (Czech Republic) Jana Csizmaziová
- (Czech Republic) Klára Daníčková
- (Czech Republic) Tereza Kučerová
- (Czech Republic) Denisa Rancová
- (Czech Republic) Alžaběta Vaněčková
- (Czech Republic) Tereza Veselá
- (Denmark) Hannah Jørgensen
- (Denmark) Andrea Leervad Thierry
- (England) Eva Hendle
- (Faroe Islands) Kára Askham Sigurðsson
- (Finland) Martta Orava
- (Finland) Rebecca Viljamaa
- (France) Rachael Adedini
- (France) Medina Belaid
- (Germany) Lotta Wrede
- (Germany) Amy Wrigge
- (Germany) Luzie Zähringer
- (Greece) Margarita Mara
- (Iceland) Rebekka Sif Brynjarsdóttir
- (Iceland) Fanney Lísa Jóhannesdóttir
- (Italy) Morena Maria Gianfico
- (Kazakhstan) Aizere Muratzhan
- (Kazakhstan) Aru Yermagambetova
- (Latvia) Keita Zviedre
- (Lithuania) Justina Blaževičūtė
- (Lithuania) Jotvilė Šapaitė
- (Malta) Kay Axiak
- (Malta) Nina-Lee Naudi
- (Montenegro) Aleka Balevic
- (Montenegro) Teodora Cebalovic
- (Netherlands) Aymee Altena
- (Netherlands) Ranneke Derks
- (Netherlands) Maud Koster
- (Netherlands) Tess van der Vliet
- (Northern Ireland) Abbie Smyth
- (Norway) Tomine Enger
- (Norway) Mille Helland Flø
- (Poland) Zofia Burzan
- (Poland) Wiktoria Skrzypczak
- (Portugal) Carolina Simões
- (Republic of Ireland) Ella Kelly
- (Romania) Boglarka Fulop
- (Romania) Anastasia Lionte
- (Scotland) Orla Burn
- (Scotland) Amy Sharkey
- (Serbia) Maja Elizabeth Cenanovic
- (Serbia) Hana Sinanović
- (Slovakia) Victoria Havalec
- (Slovakia) Sára Kerešová
- (Slovakia) Esther Melicharek
- (Slovakia) Terézia Šoltysová
- (Slovakia) Emily Suchoňová
- (Spain) María Carvajal
- (Spain) Carlota Chacón
- (Sweden) Nova Selin
- (Switzerland) Amélie Schmitz
- (Ukraine) Viktoriia Savkina

1 goal

- (Albania) Gurie Mehmetaj
- (Albania) Amelia Reci
- (Andorra) Ariadna Pernia
- (Andorra) Èlia Quilez
- (Austria) Dionna Dike
- (Austria) Valentina Pötzl
- (Austria) Alba Szuchy
- (Azerbaijan) Ayshan Salamzada
- (Belarus) Karolina Guzovskaya
- (Belarus) Maryia Kupriyanchik
- (Belarus) Lizaveta Marchuk
- (Belarus) Valeryia Vasiliuk
- (Belarus) Marharyta Yurchuk
- (Belgium) Gabrielle Delille
- (Belgium) Louize Haentjens
- (Belgium) Lotte van der Haegen
- (Belgium) Free van Neste
- (Bosnia and Herzegovina) Jelena Blagojević
- (Bosnia and Herzegovina) Uma Hadžihajdarević
- (Bulgaria) Monika Baliova
- (Bulgaria) Raya Filipova
- (Bulgaria) Gergana Halyanova
- (Bulgaria) Silyana Mihaleva
- (Croatia) Valentina Akrap
- (Croatia) Marija Došen
- (Croatia) Gia Kalaš
- (Croatia) Dana Šalić
- (Czech Republic) Ellen Eiseltová
- (Czech Republic) Barbora Najvarová
- (Czech Republic) Jolana Pávková
- (Czech Republic) Eliška Stejskalová
- (Czech Republic) Zuzana Vavrlová
- (Denmark) Carla Domino
- (Denmark) Selma Kjær Karstensen
- (Denmark) Sofie Zinn Lundberg
- (Denmark) Alberte Mott
- (England) Zara Bailey
- (England) Isabel Hebard
- (England) Freya Hirons
- (England) Vera Jones
- (England) Sacha Lewis
- (England) Jhanaie Pierre
- (England) Chloe Sarwie
- (England) Lois Shooter
- (Estonia) Grete Gross
- (Estonia) Anastasija Južaninova
- (Estonia) Jelizaveta Južaninova
- (Estonia) Marie Kala
- (Estonia) Bea Kristiansen
- (Estonia) Gerda Liisa Matson
- (Estonia) Gretlin Pihlak
- (Estonia) Reti Marleen Ränk
- (Faroe Islands) Sigrið Hansdóttir
- (Faroe Islands) Karla Sjóstein
- (Finland) Melissa Ahlroos
- (Finland) Lotta Hakola
- (Finland) Aada Mandelin
- (Finland) Jessi Sipilä
- (Finland) Queenie Xiang
- (France) Sofia Djoubri
- (France) Luna Laboucarie
- (France) Camille Marmillot
- (Georgia (country)) Lolita Kaloiani
- (Georgia (country)) Sophie Khelashvili
- (Germany) Miriam Arici
- (Germany) Lany Mia Bäcker
- (Germany) Marie Gmeineder
- (Germany) Mia-Lena Maas
- (Germany) Lina Szaraz
- (Greece) Sofia Eleni Velissaridou
- (Hungary) Hanna Alasz
- (Hungary) Ramóna Tóth
- (Hungary) Piroschka Wolff
- (Iceland) Edith Kristín Kristjánsdóttir
- (Iceland) Thelma Karen Pálmadóttir
- (Israel) Roni Dagan Bokobza
- (Israel) Ayelet Cohen
- (Israel) Karen Clarissa Fabian
- (Israel) Ella Ben Zvi
- (Italy) Benedetta Bedini
- (Italy) Martina Bressan
- (Italy) Anna Copelli
- (Italy) Rachele Giudici
- (Latvia) Anna Artemjeva
- (Latvia) Kasandra Reina Dzene
- (Latvia) Jekaterina Haritonova
- (Latvia) Samanta Nikola Zālīte
- (Lithuania) Austėja Jokubaitytė
- (Lithuania) Radvilė Kelečiūtė
- (Lithuania) Ema Valiukevicius
- (Luxembourg) Silvia Conte
- (Luxembourg) Lisa Daffix
- (Luxembourg) Carmen Kirps
- (Luxembourg) Martina Palazzo
- (Luxembourg) Clara Rosenbrock
- (Kazakhstan) Danagul Akhmetzhan
- (Kazakhstan) Assel Zholbolat
- (Kosovo) Statovci Albonita
- (Kosovo) Blerta Asllanaj
- (Kosovo) Olsa Maqastena
- (Kosovo) Adela Sinani
- (Moldova) Elisaveta Belcencova
- (Moldova) Adela Borșci
- (Moldova) Polina Mazur
- (Moldova) Victoria Rubanovici
- (Montenegro) Elena Damjanovic
- (Montenegro) Jana Merdović
- (Montenegro) Ena Spahić
- (Montenegro) Ana Vlahovic
- (Netherlands) Lotus Meekelenkamp
- (Netherlands) Liv Anne Pennock
- (Netherlands) Rosalie Renfurm
- (Netherlands) Jayda Vickers
- (Northern Ireland) Charlotte Havern
- (Northern Ireland) Ellen McDermott
- (Northern Ireland) Jessica McGuinness
- (North Macedonia) Melanija Grozdanova
- (North Macedonia) Eva Velichkova
- (Norway) Aida Bergnor
- (Norway) Heidi Steinsbø Halbmayr
- (Norway) Christina Louise Herseth
- (Norway) Sigrid Antonsen Gamst
- (Norway) Elida Holvik Kolbjørnsen
- (Norway) Sandra Pallesen Nygård
- (Norway) Serah Senior-Hårvik
- (Poland) Nicola Madejczyk
- (Poland) Julia Ostrowska
- (Poland) Lena Świrska
- (Poland) Blanka Zając
- (Poland) Wiktoria Zgrzeba
- (Portugal) Luana Bessa
- (Portugal) Francisca Castro
- (Portugal) Cristina Fernandes
- (Portugal) Íris Fernandes
- (Portugal) Constança Maia
- (Portugal) Francisca Vieira
- (Republic of Ireland) Ciara Breslin
- (Republic of Ireland) Sophia Leonard
- (Republic of Ireland) Leah Mcgrath
- (Republic of Ireland) Ava Mullins
- (Republic of Ireland) Beatrice Silickaite
- (Romania) Violeta Bogos
- (Romania) Sara Bortea
- (Romania) Aida- Maria Bucșa
- (Scotland) Mae English
- (Scotland) Kate Fraser
- (Scotland) Cara Gray
- (Scotland) Neve Mcdonald
- (Scotland) Sienna Mcgoldrick
- (Serbia) Tamara Lukić
- (Serbia) Iva Miladinovic
- (Serbia) Lorena Petrovic
- (Serbia) Jana Topić
- (Slovakia) Laura Bučková
- (Slovenia) Ula Osolnik
- (Slovenia) Taja Strgar
- (Slovenia) Neža Žagar
- (Spain) Claudia Barrios
- (Spain) Lua Calo
- (Spain) Claudia Indias
- (Spain) Anna Quer
- (Spain) Raquel Zuazo
- (Sweden) Klara Ahnberg
- (Sweden) Mollie Josefsson
- (Sweden) Emilia Migas
- (Sweden) Fanny Peterson
- (Switzerland) Alicia Alioth
- (Switzerland) Giorgia Bianchi
- (Switzerland) Emilia Braun
- (Switzerland) Olivia Edelmann
- (Switzerland) Lynn Von Euw
- (Switzerland) Siara Gmür
- (Switzerland) Aynoa Mischler
- (Turkey) Elvin Balci
- (Turkey) Yaren Ersen
- (Turkey) Buket Ozsoy
- (Turkey) Zeliya Nur Şengül
- (Turkey) Merve Taşucu
- (Ukraine) Anna Avramenko
- (Ukraine) Zoriana Hladun
- (Ukraine) Milena Ivanchenko
- (Ukraine) Sofiia Konovalova
- (Ukraine) Evelina Kuptsova
- (Ukraine) Kseniia Vorobei
- (Wales) Layla Drury
- (Wales) Skye Hair
- (Wales) Nia Lewis
- (Wales) Ellen Marsh

1 own goal

- (Andorra) Isabel Cañete (against Hungary)
- (Belgium) Louize Haentjens (against Germany)
- (Belarus) Karolina Guzovskaya (against Greece)
- (England) Isabella Cowley (against Finland)
- (France) Ludivine Bardet (against Scotland)
- (Greece) Eva Carreira (against Portugal)
- (Kosovo) Blerta Asllanaj (against Denmark)
- (Malta) Ilona Abela (against Romania)
- (Netherlands) Maud Koster (against England)
- (Republic of Ireland) Finley Newell (against Austria)
- (Romania) Violeta Bogos (against Ukraine)
- (Slovakia) Katarína Tordajiová (against France)
- (Slovenia) Lana Kavaš (against Switzerland)
