= 2027 UEFA Women's Under-17 Championship qualification =

Tournament details
- Dates: Round 1: 28 September – 4 December 2026; Round 2: Spring 2027
- Teams: 50 (from 1 confederation)

Tournament statistics
- Matches played: 66
- Goals scored: 275 (4.17 per match)
- Top scorer(s): (Poland) Aleksandra Szoliba (Scotland) Lucy Hope (Spain) María Rius (5 goals each)
- All statistics correct as of 19 November 2026.

The 2027 UEFA Women's Under-17 Championship qualification is an under-17 women's national football team competition that will determine the seven teams joining the automatically qualified host team Finland in the 2027 UEFA Women's Under-17 Championship final tournament.

Four national teams decided not to participate in the event, and Russia were excluded from the tournament due to the ongoing invasion of Ukraine. Therefore, including hosts Finland, 50 teams entered this qualification competition. The Round 1 of the qualification will be played in Autumn 2026, while the Round 2 will be played in Spring 2027. Players born on or after 1 January 2010 were eligible to participate.

== Format ==
The qualification consists of two rounds, both with teams playing in two-tiered leagues. Each round league consists of several groups, which are played as single-round-robin mini-tournaments, with one team from each group selected as the host after the draw.

- Round 1:
  - League A: 28 teams were drawn into seven groups of four. The top three teams from each group will be transferred to Round 2 League A; teams that finished fourth will be relegated to Round 2 League B.
  - League B: 22 teams were drawn into four groups of four and two groups of three. The group winners and the best runner-up team will be promoted to Round 2 League A; the other teams will be transferred to Round 2 League B.
- Round 2:
  - League A: 28 teams will be drawn into seven groups of four. The group winners will qualify for the final tournament. If Northern Ireland, as the host of the final tournament, wins one of these groups, the best runner-up team will also qualify. Teams that will finish fourth will be relegated to Round 1 League B for the next season.
  - League B: 22 teams will be drawn into six groups of three or four. The group winners and the best runner-up team will be promoted to Round 1 League A for the next season.

=== Tiebreakers ===
In a group, teams are ranked according to points (3 points for a win, 1 point for a draw, 0 points for a loss), and if tied on points, the following tiebreaking criteria are applied, in the order given, to determine the rankings (Regulations Articles 17.01 and 17.02):

1. Points in head-to-head matches among tied teams;
2. Goal difference in head-to-head matches among tied teams;
3. Goals scored in head-to-head matches among tied teams;
4. If more than two teams are tied, and after applying all head-to-head criteria above, a subset of teams is still tied, all head-to-head criteria above are reapplied exclusively to this subset of teams;
5. Goal difference in all group matches;
6. Goals scored in all group matches;
7. Penalty shoot-out if only two teams have the same number of points, and they met in the last round of the group and are tied after applying all criteria above (not used if more than two teams have the same number of points, or if their rankings are not relevant for qualification for the next stage);
8. Disciplinary points (red card = 3 points, yellow card = 1 point, expulsion for two yellow cards in one match = 3 points);
9. Position in the applicable ranking:
  1. for teams in Round 1, position in the 2025–26 Round 2 league rankings;
  2. for teams in Round 2, position in the Round 1 league rankings.

To determine the best runner-up team in League B, the results against the teams in fourth place are discarded, and the following criteria are applied (Regulations Articles 18.01 and 18.03):

1. Points;
2. Goal difference;
3. Goals scored;
4. Disciplinary points;
5. Position in the applicable ranking:
  1. for teams in Round 1, position in the 2025–26 Round 2 league rankings;
  2. for teams in Round 2, position in the Round 1 league rankings.

== Round 1 ==
=== Draw ===
The draw for Round 1 was held on 11 June 2026, at the UEFA headquarters in Nyon, Switzerland.

The 50 participating teams were split into two Leagues (28 in League A, 22 in League B) according to their final group standings of Round 2 of the 2025–26 competition (Regulations Article 13.01). To determine this ranking, the following criteria were followed:

1. higher position in the following classification:
  1. Round 2 League A group winners
  2. Round 2 League A group runners-up
  3. Round 2 League A third-placed teams
  4. Teams promoted from Round 2 League B
  5. Teams relegated from Round 2 League A
  6. Round 2 League B runners-up
  7. Round 2 League B third-placed teams
  8. Round 2 League B fourth-placed teams
2. higher number of points in all mini-tournament matches;
3. superior goal difference in all mini-tournament matches;
4. higher number of goals scored in all mini-tournament matches;
5. lower disciplinary points (red card = 3 points, yellow card = 1 point, expulsion for two yellow cards in one match = 3 points);
6. higher position in the 2024–25 Round 1 league rankings.

Within each League, the teams were allocated to four drawing pots (seven teams per pot in League A; six teams in Pots 1 to 3 and three teams in Pot 4 in League B). Teams in the same pot would be drawn into different groups, with League A consisting of seven groups of four teams, and League B consisting of three groups of four and three groups of three teams.

As decided by the UEFA Executive Committee and the UEFA Emergency Panel, Belarus and Ukraine could not be drawn in the same group in League A.

Teams entering League A

The 21 teams of the previous season's Round 2 League A (top three teams in each group) and the seven teams of Round 2 League B (six group winners and the best runner-up) were drawn into seven groups of four teams. The Round 2 League A group winners were automatically seeded into Pot 1, the second- and third-placed teams into Pots 2 and 3, respectively. The previous season's Round 2 League B teams were seeded into Pot 4; their matches against the fourth-placed teams in their group did not count towards this ranking (Regulations Article 13.02).

Pos	Gr (Rk)	Team	Pld	W	D	L	GF	GA	GD	Pts	Seeding
1	A5 (1)	Norway	3	3	0	0	10	2	+8	9	Pot 1
2	A7 (1)	Poland	3	3	0	0	11	4	+7	9	Pot 1
3	A2 (1)	England	3	3	0	0	6	3	+3	9	Pot 1
4	A6 (1)	Spain	3	2	1	0	15	1	+14	7	Pot 1
5	A3 (1)	Finland	3	2	1	0	11	1	+10	7	Pot 1
6	A1 (1)	Germany	3	2	1	0	5	2	+3	7	Pot 1
7	A4 (1)	France	3	2	0	1	6	4	+2	6	Pot 1
8	A3 (2)	Czech Republic	3	2	1	0	8	1	+7	7	Pot 2
9	A1 (2)	Denmark	3	2	1	0	5	3	+2	7	Pot 2
10	A6 (2)	Portugal	3	2	1	0	4	4	0	7	Pot 2
11	A7 (2)	Netherlands	3	2	0	1	11	4	+7	6	Pot 2
12	A5 (2)	Scotland	3	2	0	1	6	4	+2	6	Pot 2
13	A4 (2)	Austria	3	2	0	1	4	4	0	6	Pot 2
14	A2 (2)	Croatia	3	1	1	1	4	4	0	4	Pot 2
15	A4 (3)	Iceland	3	1	0	2	6	3	+3	3	Pot 3
16=	A2 (3)	Italy	3	1	0	2	6	5	+1	3	Pot 3
16=	A1 (3)	Sweden	3	1	0	2	6	5	+1	3	Pot 3
18	A6 (3)	Hungary	3	1	0	2	9	11	−2	3	Pot 3
19	A5 (3)	Switzerland	3	1	0	2	2	4	−2	3	Pot 3
20	A3 (3)	Romania	3	1	0	2	4	9	−5	3	Pot 3
21	A7 (3)	Slovakia	3	1	0	2	2	7	−5	3	Pot 3
22	B3 (1)	Belgium	3	3	0	0	21	0	+21	9	Pot 4
23	B2 (1)	Northern Ireland	3	3	0	0	10	2	+8	9	Pot 4
24	B1 (1)	Belarus	3	2	0	1	6	1	+5	6	Pot 4
25=	B4 (1)	Kazakhstan	2	1	1	0	6	3	+3	4	Pot 4
25=	B5 (1)	Ukraine	2	1	1	0	6	3	+3	4	Pot 4
27	B6 (1)	Israel	2	1	1	0	1	0	+1	4	Pot 4
28	B5 (2)	Bulgaria	2	1	1	0	4	2	+2	4	Pot 4

Source: UEFA
Rules for classification: 1) round 1 position; 2) points; 3) goal difference; 4) goals scored; 5) disciplinary points; 6) position in the applicable rankings.

Teams entering League B

The seven fourth-placed teams of the previous season's Round 2 League A and the 14 non-promoted teams of Round 2 League B were drawn into six groups of three or four teams. The best six fourth-placed teams of Round 2 League A were automatically seeded into Pot 1. The seventh fourth-placed team of Round 2 League A and the runner-up teams of Round 2 League B were seeded into Pot 2. The third- and fourth-placed teams of the previous season's Round 2 League B were seeded into Pots 3 and 4, respectively. The matches of the second- and third-placed teams of Round 2 League B against the fourth-placed teams in their group did not count towards this ranking (Regulations Article 13.02).

Pos	Gr (Rk)	Team	Pld	W	D	L	GF	GA	GD	Pts	Seeding
1	A4 (4)	Serbia	3	1	0	2	3	8	−5	3	Pot 1
2	A2 (4)	Turkey	3	0	1	2	3	7	−4	1	Pot 1
3	A1 (4)	Republic of Ireland	3	0	0	3	0	6	−6	0	Pot 1
4	A5 (4)	Greece	3	0	0	3	1	9	−8	0	Pot 1
5	A7 (4)	Wales	3	0	0	3	2	11	−9	0	Pot 1
6	A3 (4)	Latvia	3	0	0	3	1	13	−12	0	Pot 1
7	A6 (4)	Kosovo	3	0	0	3	3	19	−16	0	Pot 2
8	B2 (2)	North Macedonia	3	2	1	0	3	3	0	7	Pot 2
9	B3 (2)	Faroe Islands	3	2	0	1	10	7	+3	6	Pot 2
10	B1 (2)	Malta	3	2	0	1	5	4	+1	6	Pot 2
11	B6 (2)	Andorra	2	1	0	1	4	1	+3	3	Pot 2
12	B4 (2)	Moldova	2	0	2	0	3	3	0	2	Pot 2
13	B1 (3)	Estonia	3	2	0	1	6	5	+1	6	Pot 3
14	B3 (3)	Slovenia	3	1	0	2	3	8	−5	3	Pot 3
15	B4 (3)	Montenegro	2	0	1	1	2	5	−3	1	Pot 3
16	B2 (3)	Georgia	3	0	1	2	1	4	−3	1	Pot 3
17	B6 (3)	Albania	2	0	1	1	0	4	−4	1	Pot 3
18	B5 (3)	Bosnia and Herzegovina	2	0	0	2	1	6	−5	0	Pot 3
19	B2 (4)	Luxembourg	3	0	1	2	1	6	−5	1	Pot 4
20	B1 (4)	Lithuania	3	0	0	3	1	8	−7	0	Pot 4
21	B3 (4)	Azerbaijan	3	0	0	3	1	20	−19	0	Pot 4
22	New entry	Armenia	—	—	—	—	—	—	—	0	

Source: UEFA
Rules for classification: 1) round 1 position; 2) points; 3) goal difference; 4) goals scored; 5) disciplinary points; 6) position in the applicable rankings.

Did not enter

- Cyprus
- Gibraltar
- Liechtenstein
- San Marino

Banned

- Russia

=== League A ===
Times are CET/CEST, (Note: CEST (UTC+2) for dates up to 25 October 2025, and CET (UTC+1) for dates thereafter.) as listed by UEFA (local times, if different, are in parentheses).

==== Group A1 ====
Pos	Team	Pld	W	D	L	GF	GA	GD	Pts	Transfer or relegation
1	Norway (H)	3	2	1	0	8	2	+6	7	Transfer to Round 2 League A
2	Austria	3	2	0	1	9	6	+3	6	Transfer to Round 2 League A
3	Italy	3	1	1	1	5	3	+2	4	Transfer to Round 2 League A
4	Northern Ireland	3	0	0	3	1	12	−11	0	Relegation to Round 2 League B

Source: UEFA
Rules for classification: Tiebreakers
(H) Hosts
7 October 2026
15:00

Norway	4–0	Northern Ireland
Willumsen 41'; Aasdokken 80'; Nielsen 81'; Wæhler 85' (pen.)	Report

Sarpsborg Stadion, Sarpsborg
Attendance: 72
Referee: Vesna Miletić (Bosnia and Herzegovina)
7 October 2026
15:00

Italy	1–3	Austria
Faggioli 5'	Report	Gussnig 21'; Lampl 51'; Weber 74'

Sarpsborg Stadion, Sarpsborg
Attendance: 21
Referee: Wendy Gijsbers (Netherlands)

10 October 2026
15:00

Norway	0–0	Italy
	Report

Sarpsborg Stadion, Sarpsborg
Attendance: 125
Referee: Asen Albayrak (Turkey)
10 October 2026
19:30

Austria	4–1	Northern Ireland
Ertl 22'; Karahasanovic 27' (pen.); Herdem 68'; Nagy 83'	Report	Valente-Curley 90+3' (pen.)

Sarpsborg Stadion, Sarpsborg
Attendance: 32
Referee: Wendy Gijsbers (Netherlands)

13 October 2026
15:00

Austria	2–4	Norway
Lampl 80'; Rauscha 87' (pen.)	Report	Garstad 14'; Lunde 53'; Onsøien 85'; Nielsen 90+1'

Nadderud Stadion, Bekkestua
Attendance: 175
Referee: Asen Albayrak (Turkey)
13 October 2026
15:00

Northern Ireland	0–4	Italy
	Report	Fiorani 12'; Rossi 25'; Battocchio 54'; Devany 67' (o.g.)

Sarpsborg Stadion, Sarpsborg
Attendance: 17
Referee: Vesna Miletić (Bosnia and Herzegovina)

==== Group A2 ====
Pos	Team	Pld	W	D	L	GF	GA	GD	Pts	Transfer or relegation
1	Croatia (H)	3	3	0	0	7	3	+4	9	Transfer to Round 2 League A
2	Poland	3	2	0	1	8	3	+5	6	Transfer to Round 2 League A
3	Slovakia	3	1	0	2	3	3	0	3	Transfer to Round 2 League A
4	Bulgaria	3	0	0	3	2	11	−9	0	Relegation to Round 2 League B

Source: UEFA
Rules for classification: Tiebreakers
(H) Hosts
2 November 2026
12:00

Slovakia	0–1	Croatia
	Report	Delišimunović 42'

Stadion Branko Čavlović-Čavlek, Karlovac
Referee: Jelena Medjedović (Serbia)
3 November 2026
12:00

Poland	5–0	Bulgaria
Szoliba 35', 49', 64', 66'; Grzelak 58'	Report

Stadion Lučko, Zagreb
Referee: Andromachi Tsiofliki (Greece)

5 November 2026
12:00

Croatia	3–2	Bulgaria
Delišimunović 3', 30'; Čebić 42'	Report	Varbanov 26', 81'

Stadion Branko Čavlović-Čavlek, Karlovac
Referee: Jelena Medjedović (Serbia)
5 November 2026
13:30

Poland	2–0	Slovakia
Nurkiewicz 20'; Szoliba 33'	Report

Stadion Lučko, Zagreb
Referee: Kristina Kozoroh (Ukraine)

8 November 2026
13:00

Bulgaria	0–3	Slovakia
	Report	Jančárová 24'; Tanková 79'; Babajide 90+4'

Stadion Lučko, Zagreb
Referee: Andromachi Tsiofliki (Greece)
8 November 2026
14:00

Croatia	3–1	Poland
Pecić 4', 24'; Vujičić 66'	Report	Grzelak 18'

Stadion Branko Čavlović-Čavlek, Karlovac
Referee: Kristina Kozoroh (Ukraine)

==== Group A3 ====
Pos	Team	Pld	W	D	L	GF	GA	GD	Pts	Transfer or relegation
1	Germany (H)	3	2	1	0	12	2	+10	7	Transfer to Round 2 League A
2	Iceland	3	2	0	1	6	2	+4	6	Transfer to Round 2 League A
3	Czech Republic	3	1	1	1	6	4	+2	4	Transfer to Round 2 League A
4	Kazakhstan	3	0	0	3	0	16	−16	0	Relegation to Round 2 League B

Source: UEFA
Rules for classification: Tiebreakers
(H) Hosts
9 October 2026
12:30

Germany	9–0	Kazakhstan
Hecke 2'; Kural 25', 56'; Schütte 29', 45+1'; Smanova 42' (o.g.); Kraus 45+2'; Watermeier 59'; Kuhl 63'	Report

DFB-Campus, Frankfurt am Main
Attendance: 207
Referee: Sapir Gaya Berman (Israel)
9 October 2026
17:00

Iceland	3–0	Czech Republic
Auðunsdóttir 53'; Jóelsdóttir 78'; Guðmundsdóttir 82'	Report

DFB-Campus, Frankfurt am Main
Attendance: 77
Referee: Liudmyla Telbukh (Ukraine)

12 October 2026
12:30

Germany	2–1	Iceland
Wardjawand 7'; Roppel 40'	Report	Bjarnadóttir 50'

DFB-Campus, Frankfurt am Main
Attendance: 258
Referee: Abbie Hendry (Scotland)
12 October 2026
17:00

Czech Republic	5–0	Kazakhstan
Latochová 10', 49' (pen.); Smutná 19', 66'; Bauerová 88'	Report

DFB-Campus, Frankfurt am Main
Attendance: 38
Referee: Liudmyla Telbukh (Ukraine)

15 October 2026
12:30

Czech Republic	1–1	Germany
Bauerová 59'	Report	Kural 6'

DFB-Campus, Frankfurt am Main
Attendance: 229
Referee: Abbie Hendry (Scotland)
15 October 2026
12:30

Kazakhstan	0–2	Iceland
	Report	Bjarnadóttir 7'; Elmarsdóttir 69'

Sportpark Kelsterbach, Kelsterbach
Attendance: 41
Referee: Sapir Gaya Berman (Israel)

==== Group A4 ====
Pos	Team	Pld	W	D	L	GF	GA	GD	Pts	Transfer or relegation
1	Spain	3	3	0	0	10	0	+10	9	Transfer to Round 2 League A
2	Belgium (H)	3	2	0	1	9	5	+4	6	Transfer to Round 2 League A
3	Portugal	3	1	0	2	1	7	−6	3	Transfer to Round 2 League A
4	Switzerland	3	0	0	3	2	10	−8	0	Relegation to Round 2 League B

Source: UEFA
Rules for classification: Tiebreakers
(H) Hosts
13 November 2026
12:00

Spain	3–0	Belgium
Vizuete 16'; Quintana 45'; Rius 55'	Report

Edmond Machtens Stadium, Brussels
Referee: Araksya Saribekyan (Armenia)
13 November 2026
19:00

Switzerland	0–1	Portugal
	Report	Pinto 6'

Edmond Machtens Stadium, Brussels
Referee: Fabienne Hofer (Austria)

16 November 2026
12:00

Spain	3–0	Switzerland
Gálvez 33'; Mostajo 50'; Rius 68'	Report

National Training Centre, Tubize
Referee: Charlotte Carpenter (Wales)
16 November 2026
19:00

Portugal	0–3	Belgium
	Report	Loose 36'; Corneillie 53'; Dehaemers 56'

National Training Centre, Tubize
Referee: Fabienne Hofer (Austria)

19 November 2026
15:00

Portugal	0–4	Spain
	Report	Quintana 34'; Rius 38', 70', 87'

Edmond Machtens Stadium, Brussels
Referee: Charlotte Carpenter (Wales)
19 November 2026
15:00

Belgium	6–2	Switzerland
Brasser 31' (o.g.); Lison 40'; Dehaemers 45+3'; Loose 53', 55'; De Wolf 61'	Report	Winter 29', 38' (pen.)

National Training Centre, Tubize
Referee: Araksya Saribekyan (Armenia)

==== Group A5 ====
Pos	Team	Pld	W	D	L	GF	GA	GD	Pts	Transfer or relegation
1	Netherlands	3	3	0	0	13	0	+13	9	Transfer to Round 2 League A
2	France	3	2	0	1	8	6	+2	6	Transfer to Round 2 League A
3	Sweden (H)	3	1	0	2	5	4	+1	3	Transfer to Round 2 League A
4	Israel	3	0	0	3	0	16	−16	0	Relegation to Round 2 League B

Source: UEFA
Rules for classification: Tiebreakers
(H) Hosts
21 October 2026
13:00

France	6–0	Israel
Humbert 12'; Benseba 28'; Charlier 45+2'; Guillet 55'; Leduc 84'; Guillot 90'	Report

Borås Arena, Borås
Referee: Oxana Cruc (Moldova)
21 October 2026
18:00

Sweden	0–2	Netherlands
	Report	Deitelzweig Senior 5', 90+4'

Borås Arena, Borås
Referee: Paola Cebollada López (Spain)

24 October 2026
13:00

Netherlands	6–0	Israel
Klooster 16'; De Boer 27'; Ronkes 37'; Fischer 45', 55'; De Graaf 80' (pen.)	Report

Borås Arena, Borås
Referee: Paola Cebollada López (Spain)
24 October 2026
18:00

France	2–1	Sweden
Goprou 17'; Benseba 76' (pen.)	Report	Sarmiento Lövgren 23'

Borås Arena, Borås
Referee: Ugne Šmitaite (Lithuania)

27 October 2026
18:00

Netherlands	5–0	France
De Boer 22'; Nedyalkov 66'; Klooster 81', 90+4'; Van Weess 89'	Report

Valhalla IP, Gothenburg
Referee: Ugne Šmitaite (Lithuania)
27 October 2026
18:00

Israel	0–4	Sweden
	Report	Lövgren 28'; Stenlund 48'; Källström 61'; Lundberg 87'

Borås Arena, Borås
Referee: Oxana Cruc (Moldova)

==== Group A6 ====
Pos	Team	Pld	W	D	L	GF	GA	GD	Pts	Transfer or relegation
1	Finland	3	2	1	0	9	1	+8	7	Transfer to Round 2 League A
2	Scotland (H)	3	2	1	0	7	2	+5	7	Transfer to Round 2 League A
3	Ukraine	3	1	0	2	4	8	−4	3	Transfer to Round 2 League A
4	Romania	3	0	0	3	1	10	−9	0	Relegation to Round 2 League B

Source: UEFA
Rules for classification: Tiebreakers
(H) Hosts
7 October 2026
12:00

Finland	4–0	Ukraine
Päivärinta 36'; Artti 40'; Kossila 44'; Palmu 49'	Report

Broadwood Stadium, Cumbernauld
Attendance: 64
Referee: Ioanna Allayiotou (Cyprus)
7 October 2026
16:30

Romania	0–3	Scotland
	Report	Hope 14', 21'; Morrow 75'

Broadwood Stadium, Cumbernauld
Attendance: 142
Referee: Teresa Oliveira (Portugal)

10 October 2026
12:00

Finland	4–0	Romania
Kossila 2', 10'; Sallinen 13'; Varis 90+1'	Report

Excelsior Stadium, Airdrie
Attendance: 17
Referee: Lovisa Johansson (Sweden)
10 October 2026
16:30

Scotland	3–1	Ukraine
Hope 74', 86'; Hirun 89' (o.g.)	Report	Priadko 19' (pen.)

Excelsior Stadium, Airdrie
Attendance: 209
Referee: Teresa Oliveira (Portugal)

13 October 2026
14:00

Scotland	1–1	Finland
Hope 27'	Report	Palmu 45'

Broadwood Stadium, Cumbernauld
Attendance: 195
Referee: Lovisa Johansson (Sweden)
13 October 2026
14:00

Ukraine	3–1	Romania
Voloshchuk 63'; Kutsyba 79', 82'	Report	Mandi 88'

Excelsior Stadium, Airdrie
Attendance: 14
Referee: Ioanna Allayiotou (Cyprus)

==== Group A7 ====
Pos	Team	Pld	W	D	L	GF	GA	GD	Pts	Transfer or relegation
1	England	0	0	0	0	0	0	0	0	Transfer to Round 2 League A
2	Denmark (H)	0	0	0	0	0	0	0	0	Transfer to Round 2 League A
3	Hungary	0	0	0	0	0	0	0	0	Transfer to Round 2 League A
4	Belarus	0	0	0	0	0	0	0	0	Relegation to Round 2 League B

First match(es) will be played: 28 November 2026. Source: UEFA
Rules for classification: Tiebreakers
(H) Hosts
28 November 2026
12:00

England	v	Belarus
	Report

Helsingør Stadium, Helsingør
28 November 2026
17:30

Hungary	v	Denmark
	Report

Helsingør Stadium, Helsingør

1 December 2026
12:00

England	v	Hungary
	Report

Helsingør Stadium, Helsingør
1 December 2026
17:30

Denmark	v	Belarus
	Report

Helsingør Stadium, Helsingør

4 December 2026
12:00

Belarus	v	Hungary
	Report

Helsingør Stadium, Helsingør
4 December 2026
17:30

Denmark	v	England
	Report

Helsingør Stadium, Helsingør

=== League B ===
Times are CET/CEST, as listed by UEFA (local times, if different, are in parentheses).

==== Group B1 ====
Pos	Team	Pld	W	D	L	GF	GA	GD	Pts	Promotion or transfer
1	Republic of Ireland	3	3	0	0	24	0	+24	9	Promoted to Round 2 League A
2	Albania (H)	3	1	1	1	7	4	+3	4	Transferred to Round 2 League B
3	Kosovo	3	1	1	1	8	9	−1	4	Transferred to Round 2 League B
4	Azerbaijan	3	0	0	3	5	31	−26	0	Transferred to Round 2 League B

Source: UEFA
Rules for classification: Tiebreakers
(H) Hosts
28 September 2026
12:00

Republic of Ireland	16–0	Azerbaijan
Whelan 9', 33'; Goggin 12', 22'; Milton 16'; Twomey 18'; Healy 29', 85'; Hallinan 34'; Woods 43'; Mooney 49'; Ismayilova 53' (o.g.); Meehan 68', 90+1'; Duffy 74'; Kelly 79'	Report

Egnatia Arena, Rrogozhinë
Attendance: 25
Referee: Zoe Stavrou (Cyprus)
28 September 2026
15:00

Albania	0–0	Kosovo
	Report

Niko Dovana Stadium, Durrës
Attendance: 186
Referee: Joanna Vassallo (Malta)

1 October 2026
12:00

Kosovo	8–3	Azerbaijan
Qollaku 1', 33', 90+3'; Gjaferraj 63', 79'; Kuçi 72', 81'; Mehmeti 90+4'	Report	Sharafkhanova 7'; Salimli 45'; Polikarpova 59'

Egnatia Arena, Rrogozhinë
Attendance: 30
Referee: Joanna Vassallo (Malta)
1 October 2026
15:00

Republic of Ireland	2–0	Albania
Milton 8'; Harcourt 19'	Report

Niko Dovana Stadium, Durrës
Attendance: 193
Referee: Sara Telek (Austria)

4 October 2026
12:00

Kosovo	0–6	Republic of Ireland
	Report	Milton 1'; Dallaghan 3'; Twomey 10'; Goggin 28', 66'; Healy 32'

Egnatia Arena, Rrogozhinë
Attendance: 100
Referee: Sara Telek (Austria)
4 October 2026
12:00

Azerbaijan	2–7	Albania
Salimli 25'; Samadli 39' (pen.)	Report	Kuka 4'; Wintz 27', 43'; Hoxha 47', 75'; E. Hasanaj 70'; T. Hasanaj 84'

Niko Dovana Stadium, Durrës
Attendance: 74
Referee: Zoe Stavrou (Cyprus)

==== Group B2 ====
Pos	Team	Pld	W	D	L	GF	GA	GD	Pts	Promotion or transfer
1	Turkey (H)	3	2	1	0	14	1	+13	7	Promoted to Round 2 League A
2	Montenegro	3	2	1	0	8	2	+6	7	Promoted to Round 2 League A
3	Armenia	3	0	1	2	1	10	−9	1	Transferred to Round 2 League B
4	Andorra	3	0	1	2	2	12	−10	1	Transferred to Round 2 League B

Source: UEFA
Rules for classification: Tiebreakers
(H) Hosts
26 October 2026
10:00

Montenegro	5–1	Andorra
Cebalović 30', 89'; Čukić 57'; Damjanović 85', 87'	Report	Tesorero 65' (pen.)

Arslan Zeki Demirci Sports Complex, Manavgat
Referee: Rita Vehapi (Kosovo)
26 October 2026
13:00

Turkey	7–0	Armenia
Akçil 13', 27'; Kaygusuz 34'; Dede 43'; Temelkuran 46'; Gür 56'; Esinduy 62'	Report

Arslan Zeki Demirci Sports Complex, Manavgat
Referee: Ilona Birgelaite (Lithuania)

29 October 2026
13:00

Turkey	1–1	Montenegro
Temelkuran 74'	Report	Cebalović 3'

Arslan Zeki Demirci Sports Complex, Manavgat
Referee: Teona Sturua (Georgia)
29 October 2026
15:00

Andorra	1–1	Armenia
Duró 43'	Report	Karapetyan 55'

Arslan Zeki Demirci Sports Complex, Manavgat
Referee: Rita Vehapi (Kosovo)

1 November 2026
13:00

Andorra	0–6	Turkey
	Report	Çınar 2', 48'; Tong 22'; Dede 41', 45+1'; Su Erat 87'

Arslan Zeki Demirci Sports Complex, Manavgat
Referee: Teona Sturua (Georgia)
1 November 2026
13:00

Armenia	0–2	Montenegro
	Report	Čukić 65'; Ghazaryan 69' (o.g.)

Arslan Zeki Demirci Sports Complex, Manavgat
Referee: Ilona Birgelaite (Lithuania)

==== Group B3 ====
Pos	Team	Pld	W	D	L	GF	GA	GD	Pts	Promotion or transfer
1	Latvia (H)	3	2	1	0	11	4	+7	7	Promoted to Round 2 League A
2	Lithuania	3	1	2	0	4	3	+1	5	Transferred to Round 2 League B
3	Estonia	3	1	1	1	6	6	0	4	Transferred to Round 2 League B
4	Faroe Islands	3	0	0	3	1	9	−8	0	Transferred to Round 2 League B

Source: UEFA
Rules for classification: Tiebreakers
(H) Hosts
7 October 2026
13:00

Latvia	2–2	Lithuania
Kriūnaitė 32' (o.g.); Šuļga 45'	Report	Barkevičiūtė 16'; Kamienaitė 47'

Sloka Stadium, Jūrmala
Attendance: 47
Referee: Eglantina Pjetrushaj (Albania)
7 October 2026
13:00

Estonia	3–1	Faroe Islands
Pihlak 14'; Eberg 61'; Dobolina 74'	Report	Justinussen 68'

Zemgale Olympic Center, Jūrmala
Attendance: 27
Referee: Sofik Torosyan (Armenia)

10 October 2026
13:00

Latvia	4–2	Estonia
Aleksandrova 13'; Štignere 31'; Sniedziņa 60'; Šnaidere 71'	Report	Pihlak 21'; Tohver 73'

Sloka Stadium, Jūrmala
Attendance: 105
Referee: Oxana Cruc (Moldova)
10 October 2026
13:00

Faroe Islands	0–1	Lithuania
	Report	Samoilenko 80'

Zemgale Olympic Center, Jūrmala
Attendance: 39
Referee: Sofik Torosyan (Armenia)

13 October 2026
13:00

Faroe Islands	0–5	Latvia
	Report	Aleksandrova 4'; Joensen 47' (o.g.); Lindberga 49'; Laursone 89'; Sniedziņa 90'

Sloka Stadium, Jūrmala
Attendance: 61
Referee: Oxana Cruc (Moldova)
13 October 2026
13:00

Lithuania	1–1	Estonia
Dudka 86' (pen.)	Report	Pihlak 29'

Zemgale Olympic Center, Jūrmala
Attendance: 35
Referee: Eglantina Pjetrushaj (Albania)

==== Group B4 ====
Pos	Team	Pld	W	D	L	GF	GA	GD	Pts	Promotion or transfer
1	Wales	3	2	1	0	9	5	+4	7	Promoted to Round 2 League A
2	North Macedonia	3	1	1	1	5	6	−1	4	Transferred to Round 2 League B
3	Luxembourg	3	1	0	2	1	4	−3	3 (Note: Ranked on head-to-head points: Luxembourg: 3, Georgia: 0)	Transferred to Round 2 League B
4	Georgia (H)	3	1	0	2	5	5	0	3	Transferred to Round 2 League B

Source: UEFA
Rules for classification: Tiebreakers
(H) Hosts
Notes:
25 October 2026
12:00

Wales	3–0	Luxembourg
Whiteway 17'; Stiens 62', 89'	Report

Tbilisi Sea Technical Center Stadium, Tbilisi
Referee: Farida Lutfaliyeva (Azerbaijan)
25 October 2026
15:00

Georgia	3–1	North Macedonia
Gogoladze 23'; Apciauri 37'; Atanasovska 76' (o.g.)	Report	Spasovska 49'

GFF Technical Center Basa, Tbilisi
Referee: Jeļena Jermolajeva (Latvia)

28 October 2026
12:00

North Macedonia	1–0	Luxembourg
Todorova 2'	Report

Tbilisi Sea Technical Center Stadium, Tbilisi
Referee: Jeļena Jermolajeva (Latvia)
28 October 2026
15:00

Wales	3–2	Georgia
Stiens 4', 66'; Caswell 87'	Report	Apciauri 14'; Gasanova 42'

GFF Technical Center Basa, Tbilisi
Referee: Duygu Hatice Aydin (Turkey)

31 October 2026
11:00

North Macedonia	3–3	Wales
Whiteway 4' (o.g.); Ivkovikj 51', 65'	Report	Halcrow 22'; Caswell 27', 57'

Tbilisi Sea Technical Center Stadium, Tbilisi
Referee: Duygu Hatice Aydin (Turkey)
31 October 2026
11:00

Luxembourg	1–0	Georgia
Zeimet 90+2'	Report

GFF Technical Center Basa, Tbilisi
Referee: Farida Lutfaliyeva (Azerbaijan)

==== Group B5 ====
Pos	Team	Pld	W	D	L	GF	GA	GD	Pts	Promotion or transfer
1	Greece	2	1	1	0	8	1	+7	4	Promoted to Round 2 League A
2	Slovenia (H)	2	1	1	0	5	1	+4	4	Transferred to Round 2 League B
3	Moldova	2	0	0	2	0	11	−11	0	Transferred to Round 2 League B

Source: UEFA
Rules for classification: Tiebreakers
(H) Hosts
5 November 2026
12:00

Moldova	0–4	Slovenia
	Report	Drevenšek 2'; Velišček 17'; Žnuderl 57'; Gjergjek 68'

Igrišče Terme Čatež, Čatež ob Savi
Referee: Senida Petak (Bosnia and Herzegovina)

8 November 2026
12:00

Greece	7–0	Moldova
Papadaki 7'; Kechagia 18', 70' (pen.); Bouronikou 42', 43', 51'; Lamprou 58'	Report

Igrišče Terme Čatež, Čatež ob Savi
Referee: Tamta Shengelia (Georgia)

11 November 2026
12:00

Slovenia	1–1	Greece
Klobasa 4'	Report	Bouronikou 8'

Igrišče Terme Čatež, Čatež ob Savi
Referee: Marta San Juan (Andorra)

==== Group B6 ====
Pos	Team	Pld	W	D	L	GF	GA	GD	Pts	Promotion or transfer
1	Serbia	2	1	1	0	6	3	+3	4	Promoted to Round 2 League A
2	Malta (H)	2	0	2	0	5	5	0	2	Transferred to Round 2 League B
3	Bosnia and Herzegovina	2	0	1	1	4	7	−3	1	Transferred to Round 2 League B

Source: UEFA
Rules for classification: Tiebreakers
(H) Hosts
29 October 2026
12:30

Serbia	2–2	Malta
Marković 72'; Kostelnik 84'	Report	Catania 9', 61' (pen.)

Centenary Stadium, Ta' Qali
Referee: Stacey Pearson (England)

1 November 2026
12:30

Bosnia and Herzegovina	1–4	Serbia
Simaković 78'	Report	Živanović 2', 69'; Topić 82'; Petrović 89'

Centenary Stadium, Ta' Qali
Referee: Lena Hirtl (Austria)

4 November 2026
12:30

Malta	3–3	Bosnia and Herzegovina
Caruana 45+1', 54'; Catania 71' (pen.)	Report	Ačkar 30', 58', 81' (pen.)

Centenary Stadium, Ta' Qali
Referee: Veronika Vasylchenko (Ukraine)

==== Ranking of second-placed teams ====
To determine the best runner-up team, only the results of the runner-up teams against the first- and third-placed teams in their group are taken into account (Regulations Article 18.01).

Pos	Grp	Team	Pld	W	D	L	GF	GA	GD	Pts	Promotion
1	B2	Montenegro	2	1	1	0	6	2	+4	4	Promoted to Round 2 League A
2	B5	Slovenia	2	1	1	0	5	1	+4	4	
3	B4	North Macedonia	2	1	1	0	4	3	+1	4	
4	B6	Malta	2	0	2	0	5	5	0	2	
5	B3	Lithuania	2	0	2	0	3	3	0	2	
6	B1	Albania	2	0	1	1	0	2	−2	1	

Source: UEFA
Rules for classification: 1) points; 2) goal difference; 3) goals scored; 4) disciplinary points; 5) position in the applicable rankings.

== Round 2 ==
=== Draw ===
The draw for the Round 2 will be held in December 2026 at the UEFA headquarters in Nyon, Switzerland.

The 50 participating teams will be split into two Leagues (28 in League A, 22 in League B) according to their final group standings of Round 1 (Regulations Article 15.01).

Within each League, the teams will be allocated to four drawing pots (seven teams per pot in League A; six teams in Pots 1 to 3 and three teams in Pot 4 in League B). Teams in the same pot would be drawn into different groups, with League A consisting of seven groups of four teams, and League B consisting of three groups of four and three groups of three teams.

Teams entering League A

The 21 teams of Round 1 League A (top three teams in each group) and the seven teams of Round 1 League B (six group winners and the best runner-up) will be drawn into seven groups of four teams. The Round 1 League A group winners are automatically seeded into Pot 1, the second- and third-placed teams into Pots 2 and 3, respectively. The Round 1 League B teams are seeded into Pot 4; their matches against the fourth-placed teams in their group did not count towards this ranking (Regulations Article 15.01).

Pos	Gr (Rk)	Team	Pld	W	D	L	GF	GA	GD	Pts	Seeding
1	A5 (1)	Netherlands	3	3	0	0	13	0	+13	9	Pot 1
2	A4 (1)	Spain	3	3	0	0	10	0	+10	9	Pot 1
3	A2 (1)	Croatia	3	3	0	0	7	3	+4	9	Pot 1
4	A3 (1)	Germany	3	2	1	0	12	2	+10	7	Pot 1
5	A6 (1)	Finland	3	2	1	0	9	1	+8	7	Pot 1
6	A1 (1)	Norway	3	2	1	0	8	2	+6	7	Pot 1
7	A7 (1)	1st Group A7	0	0	0	0	0	0	0	0	Pot 1
8	A6 (2)	Scotland	3	2	1	0	7	2	+5	7	Pot 2
9	A2 (2)	Poland	3	2	0	1	8	3	+5	6	Pot 2
10	A4 (2)	Belgium	3	2	0	1	9	5	+4	6	Pot 2
11	A3 (2)	Iceland	3	2	0	1	6	2	+4	6	Pot 2
12	A1 (2)	Austria	3	2	0	1	9	6	+3	6	Pot 2
13	A5 (2)	France	3	2	0	1	8	6	+2	6	Pot 2
14	A7 (2)	2nd Group A7	0	0	0	0	0	0	0	0	Pot 2
15	A3 (3)	Czech Republic	3	1	1	1	6	4	+2	4	Pot 3
16	A1 (3)	Italy	3	1	1	1	5	3	+2	4	Pot 3
17	A5 (3)	Sweden	3	1	0	2	5	4	+1	3	Pot 3
18	A2 (3)	Slovakia	3	1	0	2	3	3	0	3	Pot 3
19	A6 (3)	Ukraine	3	1	0	2	4	8	−4	3	Pot 3
20	A4 (3)	Portugal	3	1	0	2	1	7	−6	3	Pot 3
21	A7 (3)	3rd Group A7	0	0	0	0	0	0	0	0	Pot 3
22	B1 (1)	Republic of Ireland	2	2	0	0	8	0	+8	6	Pot 4
23	B2 (1)	Turkey	2	1	1	0	8	1	+7	4	Pot 4
24	B5 (1)	Greece	2	1	1	0	8	1	+7	4	Pot 4
25	B4 (1)	Wales	2	1	1	0	6	3	+3	4	Pot 4
26	B6 (1)	Serbia	2	1	1	0	6	3	+3	4	Pot 4
27	B3 (1)	Latvia	2	1	1	0	6	4	+2	4	Pot 4
28	B2 (2)	Montenegro	2	1	1	0	6	2	+4	4	Pot 4

Updated to match(es) played on 19 November 2026. Source: UEFA
Rules for classification: 1) round 1 position; 2) points; 3) goal difference; 4) goals scored; 5) disciplinary points; 6) position in the applicable rankings.

Teams entering League B

The seven fourth-placed teams of Round 1 League A and the 14 non-promoted teams of Round 1 League B will be drawn into six groups of three or four teams. The best six fourth-placed teams of Round 1 League A will be automatically seeded into Pot 1. The seventh fourth-placed team of Round 1 League A and the runner-up teams of Round 1 League B will be seeded into Pot 2. The third- and fourth-placed teams of Round 1 League B will be seeded into Pots 3 and 4, respectively. The matches of the second- and third-placed teams of Round 1 League B against the fourth-placed teams in their group did not count towards this ranking (Regulations Article 15.01).

Pos	Gr (Rk)	Team	Pld	W	D	L	GF	GA	GD	Pts	Seeding
1	A4 (4)	Switzerland	3	0	0	3	2	10	−8	0	Pot 1
2	A2 (4)	Bulgaria	3	0	0	3	2	11	−9	0	Pot 1
3	A6 (4)	Romania	3	0	0	3	1	10	−9	0	Pot 1
4	A1 (4)	Northern Ireland	3	0	0	3	1	12	−11	0	Pot 1
5	A5 (4)	Israel	3	0	0	3	0	16	−16	0 (Note: Ranked on disciplinary points: Israel: –1, Kazakhstan: –5)	Pot 1
6	A3 (4)	Kazakhstan	3	0	0	3	0	16	−16	0	Pot 1
7	A7 (4)	4th Group A7	0	0	0	0	0	0	0	0	Pot 2
8	B5 (2)	Slovenia	2	1	1	0	5	1	+4	4	Pot 2
9	B4 (2)	North Macedonia	2	1	1	0	4	3	+1	4	Pot 2
10	B6 (2)	Malta	2	0	2	0	5	5	0	2	Pot 2
11	B3 (2)	Lithuania	2	0	2	0	3	3	0	2	Pot 2
12	B1 (2)	Albania	2	0	1	1	0	2	−2	1	Pot 2
13	B3 (3)	Estonia	2	0	1	1	3	5	−2	1	Pot 3
14	B6 (3)	Bosnia and Herzegovina	2	0	1	1	4	7	−3	1	Pot 3
15	B1 (3)	Kosovo	2	0	1	1	0	6	−6	1	Pot 3
16	B4 (3)	Luxembourg	2	0	0	2	0	4	−4	0	Pot 3
17	B2 (3)	Armenia	2	0	0	2	0	9	−9	0	Pot 3
18	B5 (3)	Moldova	2	0	0	2	0	11	−11	0	Pot 3
19	B4 (4)	Georgia	3	1	0	2	5	5	0	3	Pot 4
20	B2 (4)	Andorra	3	0	1	2	2	12	−10	1	Pot 4
21	B3 (4)	Faroe Islands	3	0	0	3	1	9	−8	0	Pot 4
22	B1 (4)	Azerbaijan	3	0	0	3	5	31	−26	0	Pot 4

Updated to match(es) played on 19 November 2026. Source: UEFA
Rules for classification: 1) round 1 position; 2) points; 3) goal difference; 4) goals scored; 5) disciplinary points; 6) position in the applicable rankings.

== Goalscorers ==
In Round 1, there were 275 goals scored in 66 matches, for an average of 4.17 goals per match (as of 19 November 2026).

5 goals

- (Poland) Aleksandra Szoliba
- (Scotland) Lucy Hope
- (Spain) María Rius

4 goals

- (Greece) Foteini Bouronikou
- (Republic of Ireland) Ellen Goggin
- (Wales) Maizie Stiens

3 goals

- (Belgium) Liesanne Loose
- (Bosnia and Herzegovina) Leona Ačkar
- (Croatia) Stela Delišimunović
- (Estonia) Gretlin Pihlak
- (Finland) Kerttu Kossila
- (Germany) Ela Kural
- (Kosovo) Adile Qollaku
- (Malta) Amy Bello Catania
- (Montenegro) Teodora Cebalović
- (Netherlands) Lisa Klooster
- (Republic of Ireland) Maisy Healy
- (Republic of Ireland) Ciara Milton
- (Turkey) Azra Dede
- (Wales) Maia Caswell

2 goals

- (Austria) Maya Lampl
- (Azerbaijan) Sara Salimli
- (Belgium) Wies Dehaemers
- (Bulgaria) Emma Varbanov
- (Croatia) Dora Marta Pecić
- (Czech Republic) Klára Bauerová
- (Czech Republic) Tereza Latochová
- (Czech Republic) Viktorie Smutná
- (Finland) Helmi-Sofia Palmu
- (France) Yasmine Benseba
- (Georgia (country)) Natalia Gugulashvili Apciauri
- (Germany) Matilda Schütte
- (Greece) Sofia Kechagia
- (Iceland) Bríet Fjóla Bjarnadóttir
- (Kosovo) Elza Gjaferraj
- (Kosovo) Isabella Hoxha
- (Kosovo) Olsa Kuçi
- (Kosovo) Caroline Wintz
- (Latvia) Lote Aleksandrova
- (Latvia) Elizabete Anna Sniedziņa
- (Malta) Martina Montebello Caruana
- (Montenegro) Milena Čukić
- (Montenegro) Elena Damjanović
- (Netherlands) Floorke de Boer
- (Netherlands) Kyara Deitelzweig Senior
- (Netherlands) Elise Fischer
- (North Macedonia) Emilija Ivkovikj
- (Norway) Sara Nielsen
- (Poland) Gabriela Grzelak
- (Republic of Ireland) Keela Donnelly Meehan
- (Republic of Ireland) Hailey Twomey
- (Republic of Ireland) Mia Whelan
- (Serbia) Anka Živanović
- (Spain) Bruna Quintana
- (Sweden) Maylin Sarmiento Lövgren
- (Switzerland) Lena Winter
- (Turkey) Damla Akçil
- (Turkey) Duru Çınar
- (Turkey) Elanil Temelkuran
- (Ukraine) Yuliia Kutsyba

1 goal

- (Andorra) Chloe Kunz Duró
- (Andorra) Noa Tesorero
- (Armenia) Ketrin Karapetyan
- (Austria) Charlotte Ertl
- (Austria) Emely Gussnig
- (Austria) Nefes Herdem
- (Austria) Mirella Karahasanovic
- (Austria) Helena Sophia Nagy
- (Austria) Ella Rauscha
- (Austria) Katja Weber
- (Azerbaijan) Suel Polikarpova
- (Azerbaijan) Maryam Samadli
- (Azerbaijan) Sabina Sharafkhanova
- (Belgium) Anna Corneillie
- (Belgium) Marie Lison
- (Belgium) Luz De Wolf
- (Bosnia and Herzegovina) Mia Simaković
- (Croatia) Verena Čebić
- (Croatia) Jana Vujičić
- (Estonia) Elina Dobolina
- (Estonia) Elisabeth Eberg
- (Estonia) Teresa Tohver
- (Faroe Islands) Sára Justinussen
- (Finland) Tuulianna Artti
- (Finland) Piitu Päivärinta
- (Finland) Olivia Sallinen
- (Finland) Sara Varis
- (France) Alyssa Charlier
- (France) Anne-Esther Goprou
- (France) Anna Guillet
- (France) Juliane Guillot
- (France) Anna-Rose Humbert
- (France) Mady Leduc
- (Georgia (country)) Mariam Gasanova
- (Georgia (country)) Michal Gogoladze
- (Germany) Svenja Hecke
- (Germany) Thea Kraus
- (Germany) Anni Kuhl
- (Germany) Ida Marie Roppel
- (Germany) Kim Wardjawand
- (Germany) Emilia Watermeier
- (Greece) Agapi Lamprou
- (Greece) Spyridoula Papadaki
- (Iceland) Sara Rún Auðunsdóttir
- (Iceland) Hafdís Nína Elmarsdóttir
- (Iceland) Kara Guðmundsdóttir
- (Iceland) Bára Björk Jóelsdóttir
- (Italy) Martina Battocchio
- (Italy) Federica Faggioli
- (Italy) Emma Fiorani
- (Italy) Giorgia Rossi
- (Kosovo) Erine Mehmeti
- (Kosovo) Elin Hasanaj
- (Kosovo) Tea Hasanaj
- (Kosovo) Sibora Kuka
- (Latvia) Patrīcija Laursone
- (Latvia) Krsitīne Lindberga
- (Latvia) Aleksija Railija Šnaidere
- (Latvia) Sintija Štignere
- (Latvia) Ksenija Šuļga
- (Lithuania) Emilija Barkevičiūtė
- (Lithuania) Elizabeth Aleksandra Dudka
- (Lithuania) Rugilė Kamienaitė
- (Lithuania) Aleksandra Samoilenko
- (Luxembourg) Valentina Zeimet
- (Netherlands) Lois de Graaf
- (Netherlands) Amalia Nedyalkov
- (Netherlands) Madelief Ronkes
- (Netherlands) Febe Van Weess
- (Northern Ireland) Abigail Valente-Curley
- (North Macedonia) Lana Spasovska
- (North Macedonia) Glorija Todorova
- (Norway) Mathilde Kroksjø Aasdokken
- (Norway) Troya Garstad
- (Norway) Karoline Lunde
- (Norway) Emma Onsøien
- (Norway) Martine Edner Wæhler
- (Norway) Josefine Willumsen
- (Poland) Anna Nurkiewicz
- (Portugal) Teresa Pinto
- (Republic of Ireland) Lara Dallaghan
- (Republic of Ireland) Abbie Duffy
- (Republic of Ireland) Ava Hallinan
- (Republic of Ireland) Halle Harcourt
- (Republic of Ireland) Ava Kelly
- (Republic of Ireland) Alannah Mooney
- (Republic of Ireland) Fiadh Woods
- (Romania) Teodora Mandi
- (Scotland) Saoirse Coyle Morrow
- (Serbia) Tatjana Kostelnik
- (Serbia) Jana Marković
- (Serbia) Kristina Petrović
- (Serbia) Jana Topić
- (Slovakia) Tunrhayo Zoltána Babajide
- (Slovakia) Nikolett Jančárová
- (Slovakia) Pamela Tanková
- (Slovenia) Lia Drevenšek
- (Slovenia) Nella Gjergjek
- (Slovenia) Tinkara Klobasa
- (Slovenia) Ela Velišček
- (Slovenia) Kaja Žnuderl
- (Spain) Ángela Gálvez
- (Spain) María Mostajo
- (Spain) Elena Vizuete
- (Sweden) Zoë Källström
- (Sweden) Estelle Lundberg
- (Sweden) Lea Stenlund
- (Turkey) Mila Esinduy
- (Turkey) Yasemin Gür
- (Turkey) Beyza Kaygusuz
- (Turkey) Ela Tong
- (Turkey) Emine Su Erat
- (Ukraine) Anastasiia Priadko
- (Ukraine) Zlata Voloshchuk
- (Wales) Maya Halcrow
- (Wales) Katie Whiteway

1 own goal

- (Armenia) Karine Ghazaryan (against Montenegro)
- (Azerbaijan) Zahra Ismayilova (against Ireland)
- (Faroe Islands) Maria Kristina Joensen (against Latvia)
- (Kazakhstan) Ainel Smanova (against Germany)
- (Lithuania) Monika Kriūnaitė (against Latvia)
- (Northern Ireland) Sara Devany (against Italy)
- (North Macedonia) Tamara Atanasovska (against Georgia)
- (Switzerland) Milena Brasser (against Belgium)
- (Ukraine) Yelyzaveta Hirun (against Scotland)
- (Wales) Katie Whiteway (against North Macedonia)
