= Lotta Wrede =

German footballer (born 2008)

Personal information
- Date of birth: 3 April 2008 (age 18)
- Place of birth: Uelzen, Germany
- Height: 1.73 m (5 ft 8 in)
- Positions: Forward; midfielder

Team information
- Current team: Hamburger SV
- Number: 32

Youth career
- VfL Suderberg
- –2022: SV Holdenstedt
- 2022–2024: TSV Bardowick
- 2024–2025: Hamburger SV

Senior career*
Years	Team	Apps	(Gls)
2024–	Hamburger SV	40	(6)

International career^{‡}
2023–2024	Germany U16	7	(4)
2024–2025	Germany U17	12	(4)
2025–	Germany U19	9	(3)
- * Club domestic league appearances and goals as of 21:49, 11 October 2026 (UTC) ‡ National team caps and goals as of 21:05, 27 June 2026 (UTC)

Lotta Wrede (born 3 April 2008) is a German professional footballer who plays as a forward or midfielder for Frauen-Bundesliga club Hamburger SV and the Germany under-19 national team.

== Youth career ==
Wrede was born in Veerßen, Germany, and grew up in the district of Uelzen. She began her youth career at VfL Suderberg before joining SV Holdenstedt. In 2022, Wrede moved to TSV Bardowick, where she competed in boy's teams for both football and futsal. She also represented Lower Saxony's under-16 district team; in 2024, she helped Lower Saxony win the regional championship for the first time in 23 years and was named the tournament's best player.

== Club career ==
In 2024, Wrede joined Hamburger SV. She initially spent time with HSV's under-20 Regionalliga squad, but was also called on to play for the first team in the 2. Frauen-Bundesliga. During the 2024–25 preseason, Wrede scored her first club goal in a friendly match against top-flight Frauen-Bundesliga opponent Werder Bremen. She made her 2. Bundesliga debut in August 2024, at the age of 16. Wrede went on to make 14 league appearances and 3 cup appearances for HSV's first team. Wrede helped her team reach the semifinals of the DFB-Pokal, but was not able to compete in the semifinal match due to youth national team duties. She scored a goal in a 2–0 win over SC Freiburg II that secured HSV's promotion to the Frauen-Bundesliga.

On 21 May 2025, Wrede signed her first professional contract with HSV, which would run until the summer of 2026. She made her Frauen-Bundesliga debut on 7 September 2025, against VfL Wolfsburg. Wrede scored her first Bundesliga goal in a 1–0 win over RB Leipzig that also marked HSV's first Bundesliga victory since 2012. She soon became a regular starter for her team, scoring 3 goals in 22 appearances before a foot injury in April 2026 curtailed her season early. In June 2026, Spanish newspaper Mundo Deportivo reported that Wrede was a "top-target" for reigning Women's Champions League winners FC Barcelona. The newspaper released footage of Wrede visiting Barcelona's training grounds. On 1 July 2026, Wrede signed a contract extension with HSV. According to Ángel Pérez, Mundo Deportivo's FC Barcelona correspondent, this was "due to personal and academic reasons", and the relationship between Wrede and Barcelona is ongoing.

== International career ==
In November 2023, she debuted for the under-U16 national team, coming on as a substitute and then scoring 4 goals within 12 minutes in a 6–0 win over Denmark.

Two years later, she participated in the U-17's unsuccessful 2025 UEFA Women's Under-17 Championship qualification campaign. Wrede received the under-17 silver Fritz Walter Medal at the end of 2025.
