= Luxembourg women's national under-17 football team =

Women's national association football team

Luxembourg Women's U-17
- Nickname(s): Rout Léiwinnen (The Red Lionesses)
- Association: FLF
- Confederation: UEFA (Europe)
- FIFA code: LUX

First international
- Belarus 2–0 Luxembourg; 24 September 2021

Biggest win
- Georgia 0–10 Luxembourg; 27 September 2021

Biggest defeat
- Luxembourg 0–6 Iceland; 18 March 2023

Luxembourg women's national under-17 football team represents Luxembourg in international youth football competitions and is controlled by the Luxembourg Football Federation.

== Competitive record ==
=== FIFA U-17 Women's World Cup ===
The team has never qualified for the FIFA U-17 Women's World Cup

Year	Result	GP	W	D*	L	GF	GA
(New Zealand) 2008	Did not exist						
(Trinidad and Tobago) 2010	Did not exist						
(Azerbaijan) 2012	Did not exist						
(Costa Rica) 2014	Did not exist						
(Jordan) 2016	Did not exist						
(Uruguay) 2018	Did not exist						
(India) 2022	Did not qualify						
(Dominican Republic) 2024	Did not qualify						
(Morocco) 2025	Did not qualify						
Total	0/3	0	0	0	0	0	0

*Draws include knockout matches decided by penalty shoot-outs.

=== UEFA Women's Under-17 Championship ===
The team has never qualified for the UEFA Women's Under-17 Championship.

Final tournament								Qualification							
Year	Result	P	W	D*	L	F	A	P	W	D	L	F	A	R1	R2
(Switzerland) 2008	Did not exist							-							
(Switzerland) 2009	Did not exist							-							
(Switzerland) 2010	Did not exist							-							
(Switzerland) 2011	Did not exist							-							
(Switzerland) 2012	Did not exist							-							
(Switzerland) 2013	Did not exist							-							
(England) 2014	Did not exist							-							
(Iceland) 2015	Did not exist							-							
(Belarus) 2016	Did not exist							-							
(Czech Republic) 2017	Did not exist							-							
(Lithuania) 2018	Did not exist							-							
(Bulgaria) 2019	Did not exist							-							
(Sweden) ~~2020~~	Cancelled / Did not enter							-							
(Faroe Islands) ~~2021~~	Cancelled / Did not enter							-							
(Bosnia and Herzegovina) 2022	Did not qualify							6	1	1	4	14	13	B1	B1
(Estonia) 2023	Did not qualify							5	3	0	2	7	9	B1	B4
(Sweden) 2024	Did not qualify							5	1	1	3	4	10	B3	B5
(Faroe Islands) 2025	Did not qualify							5	3	0	2	14	7	B5	B2
(Northern Ireland) 2026	Did not qualify							5	0	1	4	3	11	B4	B2
(Finland) 2027	To be determined							-							
Total	0/4	0	0	0	0	0	0	26	8	3	15	42	50		

*Draws include knockout matches decided by penalty shoot-outs.

== See also ==
- Luxembourg women's national football team
