= Nova Selin =

Swedish footballer (born 2008)

Personal information
- Full name: Nova Tilde Selin
- Date of birth: 1 April 2008 (age 18)
- Position: Attacking midfielder

Team information
- Current team: AIK
- Number: 10

Youth career
- 2014–2023: Vasalund
- 2023–2024: AIK

Senior career*
Years	Team	Apps	(Gls)
2023–	AIK	60	(10)

International career^{‡}
2023–2024	Sweden U-16		
2025	Sweden U-17	15	(3)
2025	Sweden U-18		
2025–	Sweden U-19	16	(1)
2026–	Sweden U-23	2	(2)
- * Club domestic league appearances and goals as of 31 October 2026 ‡ National team caps and goals as of 12 October 2026

Nova Tilde Selin (born 1 April 2008) is a Swedish professional footballer who plays as an attacking midfielder for Damallsvenskan club AIK.

== Club career ==
Selin grew up in the Stockholm suburb of Solna. She often played football with her older brother, joining him at local club Vasalund where she trained with boys. In the summer of 2023, at the age of 15, she moved to AIK where she trained with the girls' academy, boys' academy, and women's senior squads. On 30 September 2023, she made her first-team debut off the bench in the Elitettan, helping AIK win 1–0 over Alingsås. A week later, she scored her first senior goal to conclude a 6–1 victory over Jitex. On 19 December 2023, having played a part in the club's second-division championship, she signed a three-year contract with AIK through 2026.

On 14 April 2024, Selin made her Damallsvenskan debut in AIK's opening matchday where they lost 3–1 to Kristianstad. She spent the majority of the year playing for the club's under-19 side, winning the under-19 national title, and continued training with boys' academy teams.

Selin broke into the first-team lineup the following year. On 30 August 2025, she scored her first Damallsvenskan goal in a 3–0 victory over Kristianstad. On 19 December 2025, having finished the year with three Damallsvenskan goals, she signed a new three-year contract through 2028.

On 28 March 2026, Selin scored two minutes into the year's opening Damallsvenskan fixture, the only goal of the game against Norrköping. With four goals through six games, the 18-year-old was named Damallsvenskan Player of the Month for May 2026.

== Honors ==
AIK

- Elitettan: 2023
