= Albania women's national under-17 football team =

National U-17 association football team

Albania Women's U-17
- Association: FSHF
- Confederation: UEFA (Europe)
- FIFA code: ALB

First international
- Hungary 5–0 Albania (25 September 2009)

Biggest win
- Albania 9–1 Moldova (Elbasan, Albania; 21 October 2022)

Biggest defeat
- Albania 0–6 Kosovo (Elbasan, Albania; 24 October 2022)

Albania women's national under-17 football team represents Albania in international youth football competitions. The team recorded its biggest win, against Moldova, and its biggest defeat, against Kosovo, only two days apart in October 2022.

== FIFA U-17 Women's World Cup ==
The team has never qualified for the FIFA U-17 Women's World Cup

Year	Result	Matches	Wins	Draws*	Losses	GF	GA
(New Zealand) 2008	did not qualify						
(Trinidad and Tobago) 2010	did not qualify						
(Azerbaijan) 2012	did not qualify						
(Costa Rica) 2014	did not qualify						
(Jordan) 2016	did not qualify						
(Uruguay) 2018	did not qualify						
(India) 2022	did not qualify						
(Dominican Republic) 2024	did not qualify						
(Morocco) 2025	To be determined						
Total	0/8	0	0	0	0	0	0

== UEFA Women's Under-17 Championship ==
The team has never qualified

Year	Result	GP	W	D	L	GF	GA
(Switzerland) 2008	did not qualify						
(Switzerland) 2009	did not qualify						
(Switzerland) 2010	did not qualify						
(Switzerland) 2011	did not qualify						
(Switzerland) 2012	did not qualify						
(Switzerland) 2013	did not qualify						
(England) 2014	did not qualify						
(Iceland) 2015	did not qualify						
(Belarus) 2016	did not qualify						
(Czech Republic) 2017	did not qualify						
(Lithuania) 2018	did not qualify						
(Bulgaria) 2019	did not qualify						
(Sweden) ~~2020~~	Cancelled						
(Faroe Islands) ~~2021~~	Cancelled						
(Bosnia and Herzegovina) 2022	did not qualify						
(Estonia) 2023	did not qualify						
(Sweden) 2024	did not qualify						
(Faroe Islands) 2025	did not qualify						
(Northern Ireland) 2026	did not qualify						
(Finland) 2027	to be determined						
(Belgium) 2028	to be determined						
(Turkey) 2029	to be determined						
Total	0/16	0	0	0	0	0	0

== See also ==
- Albania women's national football team
