= 2025 UEFA Women's Under-17 Championship squads =

The following is a list of squads for each national team competing at the 2025 UEFA Women's Under-17 Championship in Faroe Islands. Each national team had to submit a squad of 20 players born on or after 1 January 2008.

== Group A ==
=== Austria ===
Head coach: Patrick Haidbauer

The squad was announced on 21 April 2025.

No.	Pos.	Player	Date of birth (age)	Club
1	GK	Vivien Grabenhofer	18 May 2008 (aged 16)	(Austrian Football Association) Neulengbach
23	GK	Mia Richter	18 January 2008 (aged 17)	(Austrian Football Association) Sturm Graz
2	DF	Alissa Zimmermann	1 February 2008 (aged 17)	(Austrian Football Association) Sturm Graz
3	DF	Piia Willimek	23 September 2008 (aged 16)	(Austrian Football Association) ÖFB Frauen-Akademie
5	DF	Emira Makalic	6 February 2008 (aged 17)	(Austrian Football Association) ÖFB Frauen-Akademie
17	DF	Anika Hofschweiger	5 May 2008 (aged 16)	(Austrian Football Association) BW Linz
4	MF	Mia Tomczak	20 March 2008 (aged 17)	(Austrian Football Association) First Vienna
6	MF	Anna Osl	20 September 2008 (aged 16)	(Austrian Football Association) ÖFB Frauen-Akademie
10	MF	Emma Heiplik	10 July 2008 (aged 16)	(Austrian Football Association) ÖFB Frauen-Akademie
11	MF	Alessia Pamminger	26 July 2008 (aged 16)	(Austrian Football Association) Bergheim
13	MF	Katie Richter	4 May 2008 (aged 17)	(United States Soccer Federation) North Carolina Courage
14	MF	Sara Grabovac	25 December 2008 (aged 16)	(Austrian Football Association) Bergheim
19	MF	Katharina Moser	12 June 2008 (aged 16)	(Austrian Football Association) Austria Wien
20	MF	Julia Grünwald	23 November 2008 (aged 16)	(Austrian Football Association) Bergheim
7	FW	Alina Kerschbaumer	27 July 2008 (aged 16)	(Austrian Football Association) ÖFB Frauen-Akademie
9	FW	Denise Lueger	31 July 2008 (aged 16)	(Austrian Football Association) ÖFB Frauen-Akademie
12	FW	Ella Rauscha	5 April 2010 (aged 15)	(Austrian Football Association) ÖFB Frauen-Akademie
15	FW	Dayna Tuppinger	21 October 2008 (aged 16)	(Austrian Football Association) ÖFB Frauen-Akademie
16	FW	Emily Schäfer	19 May 2008 (aged 16)	(Austrian Football Association) Austria Wien
22	FW	Alba Szuchy	14 May 2009 (aged 15)	(Austrian Football Association) ÖFB Frauen-Akademie

=== Faroe Islands ===
Head coach: Eyðvør Jakobsen

The squad was announced on 12 April 2025.

No.	Pos.	Player	Date of birth (age)	Club
1	GK	Hanna Ellefsen	14 November 2009 (aged 15)	(Danish Football Association) Køge
12	GK	Elmelund Hansen	29 March 2010 (aged 15)	(Faroe Islands Football Association) HB
2	DF	Tóra Olsen	30 March 2008 (aged 17)	(Faroe Islands Football Association) HB
3	DF	Hansina Nesá	29 March 2008 (aged 17)	(Faroe Islands Football Association) Víkingur
5	DF	Leona Djurhuus	16 May 2008 (aged 16)	(Faroe Islands Football Association) HB
15	DF	Halla Ejdesgaard	21 February 2008 (aged 17)	(Faroe Islands Football Association) HB
4	MF	Eyðna Gaard	23 July 2008 (aged 16)	(Faroe Islands Football Association) KÍ
7	MF	Sara Benjaminsen	19 July 2009 (aged 15)	(Faroe Islands Football Association) Skála
8	MF	Durita Vón Vidtfeldt	4 July 2008 (aged 16)	(Faroe Islands Football Association) HB
11	MF	Bjørk Akselsen	19 April 2008 (aged 17)	(Faroe Islands Football Association) 07 Vestur
13	MF	Sára Kristiansen	6 February 2008 (aged 17)	(Faroe Islands Football Association) KÍ
14	MF	Anna Poulsen	13 November 2009 (aged 15)	(Faroe Islands Football Association) Skála
17	MF	Margreta í Buð	10 April 2008 (aged 17)	(Faroe Islands Football Association) KÍ
18	MF	Nita á Lakjuni	23 April 2009 (aged 16)	(Faroe Islands Football Association) ÍF
19	MF	Emma Knudsen	17 November 2009 (aged 15)	(Faroe Islands Football Association) NSÍ
20	MF	Silja Ragnarsdóttir Trier	18 August 2008 (aged 16)	(Faroe Islands Football Association) HB
6	FW	Karla Sjóstein	11 September 2008 (aged 16)	(Faroe Islands Football Association) KÍ
9	FW	Kára Sigurðsson	11 August 2009 (aged 15)	(Danish Football Association) Nordsjælland
10	FW	Sigrið Hansdóttir	4 March 2010 (aged 15)	(Faroe Islands Football Association) B36
16	FW	Ranja Joensen	5 July 2008 (aged 16)	(Faroe Islands Football Association) KÍ

=== Netherlands ===
Head coach: Sherida van Bruggen

The squad was announced on 22 April 2025.

No.	Pos.	Player	Date of birth (age)	Club
1	GK	Maren Groothoff	25 February 2009 (aged 16)	(Royal Dutch Football Association) PEC Zwolle
16	GK	Linden Alkema	20 February 2008 (aged 17)	(Royal Dutch Football Association) De Graafschap
2	DF	Naomi van der Linden	6 December 2008 (aged 16)	(Royal Dutch Football Association) Ajax
3	DF	Maud Koster	2 February 2008 (aged 17)	(Royal Dutch Football Association) Twente
4	DF	Maud Thomassen	8 April 2008 (aged 17)	(Royal Dutch Football Association) PSV
5	DF	Kim Rietveld	22 July 2008 (aged 16)	(Royal Dutch Football Association) Feyenoord
12	DF	Kiki Horváth	15 February 2008 (aged 17)	(Royal Dutch Football Association) Ajax
13	DF	Leah Fuite	2 January 2008 (aged 17)	(Royal Dutch Football Association) Twente
6	MF	Rosalie Renfurm	22 January 2008 (aged 17)	(Royal Dutch Football Association) Utrecht
8	MF	Tess van der Vliet	16 July 2008 (aged 16)	(Royal Dutch Football Association) PSV
10	MF	Jayda Vinckers	28 February 2008 (aged 17)	(Royal Dutch Football Association) Feyenoord
14	MF	Kee Hubert	14 July 2008 (aged 16)	(Royal Dutch Football Association) De Graafschap
15	MF	Anne Gelevert	22 February 2009 (aged 16)	(Royal Dutch Football Association) Twente
7	FW	Liv Pennock	27 February 2008 (aged 17)	(Royal Dutch Football Association) Twente
9	FW	Ranneke Derks	29 April 2008 (aged 17)	(Royal Dutch Football Association) PSV
11	FW	Lina Touzani	28 January 2008 (aged 17)	(Royal Dutch Football Association) Ajax
17	FW	Lotus Meekelenkamp	14 December 2008 (aged 16)	(Royal Dutch Football Association) PSV
18	FW	Ayah Eloualidi	2 May 2009 (aged 16)	(Royal Dutch Football Association) AZ
19	FW	Otylia El Belati	19 November 2008 (aged 16)	(Royal Dutch Football Association) Feyenoord
20	FW	Rochelity Dap	2 May 2008 (aged 17)	(Royal Dutch Football Association) Utrecht

=== Norway ===
Head coach: Eline Kulstad-Torneus

The squad was announced on 16 April 2025.

No.	Pos.	Player	Date of birth (age)	Club
1	GK	Maria Kroken	17 January 2008 (aged 17)	(Norwegian Football Federation) Lyn
12	GK	Sara Holte	3 June 2008 (aged 16)	(Norwegian Football Federation) AaFK
2	DF	Ebba Niss	10 November 2008 (aged 16)	(Norwegian Football Federation) Kolbotn
3	DF	Nathalie Kolseth Skeide	16 November 2008 (aged 16)	(Norwegian Football Federation) Brann
4	DF	Mille Flø	4 September 2008 (aged 16)	(Norwegian Football Federation) Stabæk
5	DF	Lea Ellingsen	10 March 2008 (aged 17)	(Norwegian Football Federation) Kolbotn
13	DF	Sandra Pallesen	20 April 2008 (aged 17)	(Norwegian Football Federation) Stabæk
16	DF	Isa Bekken Lund	14 September 2009 (aged 15)	(Norwegian Football Federation) Brann
19	DF	Sunniva Hjertvik	27 November 2008 (aged 16)	(Norwegian Football Federation) Haugesund
6	MF	Aida Berg	7 March 2008 (aged 17)	(Norwegian Football Federation) Kolbotn
7	MF	Tomine Enger	12 April 2008 (aged 17)	(Norwegian Football Federation) Vålerenga
8	MF	Sigrid Gamst	28 August 2009 (aged 15)	(Norwegian Football Federation) Kolbotn
15	MF	Celia Halvorsen	17 January 2008 (aged 17)	(Norwegian Football Federation) Stabæk
18	MF	Serah Senior-Hårvik	22 November 2008 (aged 16)	(Norwegian Football Federation) AaFK
9	FW	Marie Preus	27 August 2008 (aged 16)	(Norwegian Football Federation) Vålerenga
10	FW	Heidi Halbmayr	24 July 2008 (aged 16)	(Norwegian Football Federation) Brann
11	FW	Christina Herseth	10 September 2008 (aged 16)	(Norwegian Football Federation) LSK
14	FW	Amalie Lia	15 May 2008 (aged 16)	(Norwegian Football Federation) Kolbotn
17	FW	Mie Hoem	9 August 2009 (aged 15)	(Norwegian Football Federation) Stabæk
20	FW	Elida Kolbjørnsen	8 August 2008 (aged 16)	(Norwegian Football Federation) Stabæk

== Group B ==
=== France ===
Head coach: Mickaël Ferreira

The squad was announced on 18 April 2025.

No.	Pos.	Player	Date of birth (age)	Club
1	GK	Lauryne Chevray	6 May 2008 (aged 16)	(French Football Federation) Montpellier
16	GK	Alexane Lambert	2 October 2008 (aged 16)	(French Football Federation) Lyon
2	DF	Océane Moreau-Tranchant	27 June 2008 (aged 16)	(French Football Federation) Lyon
3	DF	Oumou Sidibé	4 January 2008 (aged 17)	(French Football Federation) PFC
4	DF	Noémie Fatier	19 July 2008 (aged 16)	(French Football Federation) PSG
5	DF	Médina Belaïd	16 March 2008 (aged 17)	(French Football Federation) PSG
12	DF	Ludivine Bardet	7 June 2008 (aged 16)	(French Football Federation) Toulouse
13	DF	Emma Troter	8 July 2008 (aged 16)	(French Football Federation) Le Mans
6	MF	Tanté Diakité	2 June 2008 (aged 16)	(French Football Federation) PSG
7	MF	Bouchra Kharafi	7 February 2008 (aged 17)	(French Football Federation) Montpellier
8	MF	Maïssa Fathallah	9 April 2009 (aged 16)	(French Football Federation) Lyon
14	MF	Emmy Lefèvre	23 November 2008 (aged 16)	(French Football Federation) Le Havre
15	MF	Stella Grondin	12 May 2008 (aged 16)	(French Football Federation) Bordeaux
19	MF	Sofia Djoubri	27 June 2008 (aged 16)	(French Football Federation) PSG
9	FW	Léa Morissaint	12 July 2008 (aged 16)	(French Football Federation) PSG
10	FW	Rachael Adedini	20 June 2009 (aged 15)	(The Football Association) Manchester City
11	FW	Luna Laboucarie	28 April 2008 (aged 17)	(French Football Federation) Le Havre
17	FW	Nadia Ramdane	18 September 2008 (aged 16)	(French Football Federation) FFNMG
18	FW	Camille Marmillot	23 July 2008 (aged 16)	(French Football Federation) Lyon
20	FW	Lou Ruffien	22 October 2008 (aged 16)	(United States Soccer Federation) Minnesota Thunder

=== Italy ===
Head coach: Selena Mazzantini

The squad was announced on 24 April 2025.

No.	Pos.	Player	Date of birth (age)	Club
1	GK	Matilde Robbioni	20 June 2008 (aged 16)	(Italian Football Federation) Inter
12	GK	Viola Sossai	24 May 2008 (aged 16)	(Italian Football Federation) Juventus
2	DF	Elisa Bertero	16 November 2008 (aged 16)	(Italian Football Federation) Juventus
3	DF	Caterina Venturelli	15 October 2008 (aged 16)	(Italian Football Federation) Sassuolo
5	DF	Sofia Pomati	11 February 2008 (aged 17)	(Italian Football Federation) Milan
14	DF	Sara Terlizzi	9 September 2008 (aged 16)	(Italian Football Federation) Roma
15	DF	Sofia Verrini	13 November 2008 (aged 16)	(Italian Football Federation) Inter
16	DF	Martina Bressan	9 July 2008 (aged 16)	(Italian Football Federation) Inter
21	DF	Francesca Randazzo	21 March 2008 (aged 17)	(Italian Football Federation) Sassuolo
4	MF	Stella Ieva	4 January 2008 (aged 17)	(Italian Football Federation) Fiorentina
6	MF	Giulia Robino	18 January 2008 (aged 17)	(Italian Football Federation) Inter
8	MF	Benedetta Bedini	11 July 2008 (aged 16)	(Italian Football Federation) Fiorentina
10	MF	Rachele Giudici	10 November 2008 (aged 16)	(Italian Football Federation) Inter
18	MF	Anna Copelli	2 January 2008 (aged 17)	(Italian Football Federation) Juventus
23	MF	Valentina Piccardi	14 April 2008 (aged 17)	(Italian Football Federation) Juventus
7	FW	Giulia Galli	23 March 2008 (aged 17)	(Italian Football Federation) Roma
9	FW	Maria Gianfico	27 January 2008 (aged 17)	(Italian Football Federation) Napoli
17	FW	Martina Romanelli	6 October 2008 (aged 16)	(Italian Football Federation) Inter
19	FW	Giulia Guerzoni	9 July 2009 (aged 15)	(Italian Football Federation) Sassuolo
20	FW	Lucrezia Sasso	15 January 2008 (aged 17)	(Italian Football Federation) Inter

=== Poland ===
Head coach: Paulina Kawalec

The squad was announced on 14 April 2025.

No.	Pos.	Player	Date of birth (age)	Club
1	GK	Zuzanna Błaszczyk	17 July 2008 (aged 16)	(Polish Football Association) GKS Katowice
12	GK	Dominika Lemańczyk	24 July 2009 (aged 15)	(Polish Football Association) UKS SMS Łódź
4	DF	Alicja Wojas	23 August 2008 (aged 16)	(Polish Football Association) GKS Katowice
5	DF	Zofia Świtała	11 March 2009 (aged 16)	(Polish Football Association) Polonia Tychy
8	DF	Liwia Prochwicz	29 March 2009 (aged 16)	(Polish Football Association) Lech Poznań
20	DF	Julia Sikora	25 October 2008 (aged 16)	(Polish Football Association) Rekord Bielsko-Biała
6	MF	Wiktoria Zgrzeba	6 November 2009 (aged 15)	(Polish Football Association) Mały Piłkarz Sępólno Krajeńskie
10	MF	Małgorzata Rogus	15 April 2008 (aged 17)	(Polish Football Association) 1KS Ślęza Wrocław
11	MF	Natalia Skrok	2 November 2009 (aged 15)	(Polish Football Association) Rekord Bielsko-Biała
13	MF	Marta Kwiatkowska	18 January 2009 (aged 16)	(Polish Football Association) Lech Poznań
14	MF	Zofia Burzan	30 May 2009 (aged 15)	(Polish Football Association) Czarni Sosnowiec
15	MF	Lena Świrska	19 May 2009 (aged 15)	(Polish Football Association) Pogoń Szczecin
16	MF	Maria Ostopinka	17 June 2008 (aged 16)	(Polish Football Association) AP Orlen Gdańsk
18	MF	Kinga Klimczak	7 March 2008 (aged 17)	(Polish Football Association) AP Orlen Gdańsk
19	MF	Blanka Zając	5 January 2009 (aged 16)	(Polish Football Association) Iskra Tarnów
21	MF	Maja Leśkiewicz	7 June 2009 (aged 15)	(Polish Football Association) Pogoń Szczecin
3	FW	Wiktoria Skrzypczak	8 January 2009 (aged 16)	(Polish Football Association) Górnik Łęczna
7	FW	Julia Ostrowska	16 September 2008 (aged 16)	(Polish Football Association) Górnik Łęczna
9	FW	Natalie Bandura	15 March 2008 (aged 17)	(Scottish Football Association) Rangers
17	FW	Amelia Guzenda	6 February 2009 (aged 16)	(Polish Football Association) Lech Poznań

=== Spain ===
Head coach: Kenio Gonzalo

The squad was announced on 21 April 2025.

No.	Pos.	Player	Date of birth (age)	Club
1	GK	Alba Fuertes	5 April 2008 (aged 17)	(Royal Spanish Football Federation) Burgos
13	GK	Anna Álvarez	17 January 2008 (aged 17)	(Royal Spanish Football Federation) Levante
2	DF	Cristina López	2 September 2008 (aged 16)	(Royal Spanish Football Federation) Barcelona
3	DF	Iraia Fernández	26 July 2009 (aged 15)	(Royal Spanish Football Federation) Athletic
4	DF	Silvia Cristóbal	1 May 2008 (aged 17)	(Royal Spanish Football Federation) Real Madrid
5	DF	Julia Torres	15 January 2009 (aged 16)	(Royal Spanish Football Federation) Sevilla
7	DF	Noa Jiménez	28 March 2008 (aged 17)	(Royal Spanish Football Federation) Barcelona
12	DF	Ane Bordagaray	25 March 2008 (aged 17)	(Royal Spanish Football Federation) Athletic
15	DF	Andrea Gálvez	2 September 2008 (aged 16)	(Royal Spanish Football Federation) Sevilla
6	MF	Vera Molina	24 April 2009 (aged 16)	(Royal Spanish Football Federation) Granada
8	MF	Celia Gómez	29 September 2008 (aged 16)	(Royal Spanish Football Federation) Atlético
10	MF	Rosalía Domínguez	11 October 2008 (aged 16)	(Royal Spanish Football Federation) Barcelona
16	MF	María Carvajal	29 July 2008 (aged 16)	(Royal Spanish Football Federation) Sporting de Huelva
18	MF	Montserrat Alabart	20 May 2008 (aged 16)	(Royal Spanish Football Federation) Barcelona
19	MF	Claudia Barrios	3 December 2008 (aged 16)	(Royal Spanish Football Federation) Burgos
9	FW	Claudia Indias	27 March 2008 (aged 17)	(Royal Spanish Football Federation) Madrid CFF
11	FW	Anna Quer	30 May 2008 (aged 16)	(Royal Spanish Football Federation) Barcelona
14	FW	Lúa Arufe	6 September 2008 (aged 16)	(Royal Spanish Football Federation) Barcelona
17	FW	Candela Rodríguez	19 April 2009 (aged 16)	(Royal Spanish Football Federation) Real Madrid
20	FW	Carlota Chacón	4 April 2009 (aged 16)	(Royal Spanish Football Federation) Real Sociedad
