= Poland women's national under-17 football team =

Poland Women's U-17
- Association: Polish Football Association
- Confederation: UEFA (Europe)
- Head coach: Paulina Kawalec
- FIFA code: POL
| First colours | Second colours |

UEFA Women's Under-17 Championship
- Appearances: 5 (first in 2013)
- Best result: Champions (2013)

FIFA U-17 Women's World Cup
- Appearances: 2 (first in 2024)
- Best result: Quarter-finals (2024)

Poland women's national under-17 football team is the football team representing Poland in competitions for under-17 year old players and is controlled by the Polish Football Association. The team made its debut at the FIFA World Cup in 2024, reaching the quarterfinals. They previously won the 2013 UEFA Championship and secured a bronze medal in the 2024 edition.

== Competitive record ==
=== FIFA U-17 Women's World Cup ===
| Year | Result | Pld | W | D* | L | GF | GA | Squad |
|---|---|---|---|---|---|---|---|---|
| (New Zealand) 2008 | Did not qualify | | | | | | | |
| (Trinidad and Tobago) 2010 | Did not qualify | | | | | | | |
| (Azerbaijan) 2012 | Did not qualify | | | | | | | |
| (Costa Rica) 2014 | Did not qualify | | | | | | | |
| (Jordan) 2016 | Did not qualify | | | | | | | |
| (Uruguay) 2018 | Did not qualify | | | | | | | |
| (India) 2022 | Did not qualify | | | | | | | |
| (Dominican Republic) 2024 | Quarter-finals | 4 | 1 | 2 | 1 | 2 | 1 | Squad |
| (Morocco) 2025 | Did not qualify | | | | | | | |
| (Morocco) 2026 | Round of 16 | 4 | 2 | 1 | 1 | 12 | 12 | Squad |
| (Morocco) 2027 | To be determined | | | | | | | |
| (Morocco) 2028 | To be determined | | | | | | | |
| (Morocco) 2029 | To be determined | | | | | | | |
| Total | 2/13 | 8 | 3 | 3 | 2 | 14 | 13 | – |

* Draws include knockout matches decided by penalty shoot-out.

=== UEFA Women's Under-17 Championship ===
| Year | Result | Pld | W | D | L | GF | GA | Squad |
|---|---|---|---|---|---|---|---|---|
| (Switzerland) 2008 | Did not qualify | | | | | | | |
| (Switzerland) 2009 | Did not qualify | | | | | | | |
| (Switzerland) 2010 | Did not qualify | | | | | | | |
| (Switzerland) 2011 | Did not qualify | | | | | | | |
| (Switzerland) 2012 | Did not qualify | | | | | | | |
| (Switzerland) 2013 | Champions | 2 | 2 | 0 | 0 | 4 | 1 | – |
| (England) 2014 | Did not qualify | | | | | | | |
| (Iceland) 2015 | Did not qualify | | | | | | | |
| (Belarus) 2016 | Did not qualify | | | | | | | |
| (Czech Republic) 2017 | Did not qualify | | | | | | | |
| (Lithuania) 2018 | Group stage | 3 | 0 | 2 | 1 | 2 | 7 | Squad |
| (Bulgaria) 2019 | Did not qualify | | | | | | | |
| (Bosnia and Herzegovina) 2022 | Did not qualify | | | | | | | |
| (Estonia) 2023 | Group stage | 3 | 1 | 0 | 2 | 7 | 5 | Squad |
| (Sweden) 2024 | Third place | 5 | 1 | 2 | 2 | 4 | 6 | Squad |
| (Faroe Islands) 2025 | Group stage | 3 | 0 | 0 | 3 | 5 | 10 | Squad |
| (Northern Ireland) 2026 | Group stage | 4 | 2 | 0 | 2 | 4 | 9 | Squad |
| (Finland) 2027 | To be determined | | | | | | | |
| (Belgium) 2028 | To be determined | | | | | | | |
| (Turkey) 2029 | To be determined | | | | | | | |
| Total | 6/20 | 20 | 6 | 4 | 10 | 26 | 38 | – |

== Players ==
=== Current squad ===
The following players were called up for the 2026 FIFA U-17 Women's World Cup.

Caps and goals updated as of 28 October 2026, after the match against Brazil.

| No. | Pos. | Player | Date of birth (age) | Caps | Goals | Club |
|---|---|---|---|---|---|---|
| 1 | GK | Dominika Lemańczyk | 24 July 2009 (age 17) | 10 | 0 | (Polish Football Association) UKS SMS Łódź |
| 12 | GK | Amelia Sikora | 17 August 2009 (age 17) | 4 | 0 | (Polish Football Association) Kobiecy KP Bydgoszcz |
| 21 | GK | Hanna Buchta | 12 February 2009 (age 17) | 17 | 0 | (Polish Football Association) Rekord Bielsko-Biała |
| 3 | DF | Lena Saja | 25 December 2009 (age 16) | 18 | 0 | (Polish Football Association) Czarni Sosnowiec |
| 4 | DF | Zuzanna Zakrzewska | 10 April 2009 (age 17) | 11 | 1 | (Polish Football Association) Kobiecy KP Bydgoszcz |
| 5 | DF | Zofia Świtała | 11 March 2009 (age 17) | 25 | 1 | (Polish Football Association) Czarni Sosnowiec |
| 20 | DF | Maja Wiśniewska | 24 November 2009 (age 16) | 23 | 1 | (Polish Football Association) Kobiecy KP Bydgoszcz |
| 2 | MF | Laura Urbańczyk | 2009 (age 16–17) | 5 | 1 | (Polish Football Association) UKS SMS Łódź |
| 6 | MF | Michalina Wiśniewska | 18 March 2010 (age 16) | 19 | 0 | (Polish Football Association) Lech Poznań |
| 7 | MF | Oliwia Grewling | 17 October 2009 (age 17) | 9 | 0 | (Polish Football Association) Pogoń Szczecin |
| 8 | MF | Natalia Skrok | 2 November 2009 (age 17) | 14 | 1 | (Polish Football Association) Rekord Bielsko-Biała |
| 11 | MF | Nicola Gałuszka | 27 December 2009 (age 16) | 17 | 7 | (Polish Football Association) Czarni Sosnowiec |
| 13 | MF | Helena Zarzycka | 17 May 2010 (age 16) | 18 | 0 | (Italian Football Federation) Roma |
| 14 | MF | Zofia Burzan | 30 May 2009 (age 17) | 26 | 15 | (Polish Football Association) Czarni Sosnowiec |
| 15 | MF | Maja Leśkiewicz | 7 June 2009 (age 17) | 14 | 1 | (Polish Football Association) Pogoń Szczecin |
| 18 | MF | Marta Kwiatkowska | 18 January 2009 (age 17) | 25 | 2 | (Polish Football Association) Lech Poznań |
| 19 | MF | Blanka Zając | 5 January 2009 (age 17) | 29 | 6 | (Polish Football Association) Pogoń Szczecin |
| 9 | FW | Zofia Cendrowska | 2 November 2009 (age 17) | 19 | 5 | (Swedish Football Association) AIK |
| 10 | FW | Wiktoria Skrypczak | 8 January 2009 (age 17) | 19 | 7 | (Italian Football Federation) Parma |
| 16 | FW | Olga Polewska | 3 September 2009 (age 17) | 12 | 2 | (Polish Football Association) Śląsk Wrocław |
| 17 | FW | Julia Kania | 2009 (age 16–17) | 5 | 2 | (Polish Football Association) Rekord Bielsko-Biała |

=== Previous squads ===
- 2018 UEFA Women's Under-17 Championship
- 2023 UEFA Women's Under-17 Championship
- 2024 UEFA Women's Under-17 Championship
- 2025 UEFA Women's Under-17 Championship
- 2026 UEFA Women's Under-17 Championship
- 2024 FIFA U-17 Women's World Cup

== Head-to-head record ==
The following table shows Poland's head-to-head record in the FIFA U-17 Women's World Cup and UEFA Women's Under-17 Championship.

=== In FIFA U-17 Women's World Cup ===
| Opponent | Pld | W | D | L | GF | GA | GD | Win % |
|---|---|---|---|---|---|---|---|---|
| Brazil | 2 | 0 | 2 | 0 | 3 | 3 | +0 | 0.00 |
| Japan | 1 | 0 | 1 | 0 | 0 | 0 | +0 | 0.00 |
| Nigeria | 1 | 1 | 0 | 0 | 2 | 1 | +1 | 100.00 |
| North Korea | 2 | 0 | 0 | 2 | 1 | 7 | −6 | 0.00 |
| Puerto Rico | 1 | 1 | 0 | 0 | 6 | 2 | +4 | 100.00 |
| Zambia | 1 | 1 | 0 | 0 | 2 | 0 | +2 | 100.00 |
| Total | 8 | 3 | 3 | 2 | 14 | 13 | +1 | 37.50 |

=== In UEFA Women's Under-17 Championship ===
| Opponent | Pld | W | D | L | GF | GA | GD | Win % |
|---|---|---|---|---|---|---|---|---|
| Belgium | 2 | 2 | 0 | 0 | 4 | 1 | +3 | 100.00 |
| England | 4 | 1 | 1 | 2 | 5 | 6 | −1 | 25.00 |
| Finland | 1 | 1 | 0 | 0 | 1 | 0 | +1 | 100.00 |
| France | 4 | 0 | 1 | 3 | 3 | 13 | −10 | 0.00 |
| Italy | 2 | 0 | 1 | 1 | 3 | 4 | −1 | 0.00 |
| Portugal | 1 | 0 | 1 | 0 | 1 | 1 | +0 | 0.00 |
| Spain | 4 | 0 | 0 | 4 | 2 | 13 | −11 | 0.00 |
| Sweden | 2 | 2 | 0 | 0 | 7 | 0 | +7 | 100.00 |
| Total | 20 | 6 | 4 | 10 | 26 | 38 | −12 | 30.00 |
