= 2024 UEFA Women's Under-17 Championship squads =

Football tournament squads

The following is a list of squads for each national team competing at the 2024 UEFA Women's Under-17 Championship in Sweden. Each national team had to submit a squad of 20 players born on or after 1 January 2007.

== Group A ==
=== England ===
The final squad was announced on 4 May 2024.

Head coach: (England) Natalie Henderson

| No. | Pos. | Player | Date of birth (age) | Club |
|---|---|---|---|---|
| 1 | GK | Hope McSheffrey | 1 April 2008 (aged 16) | (The Football Association) Arsenal |
| 2 | DF | Nelly Las | 17 December 2007 (aged 16) | (The Football Association) Leicester City |
| 3 | DF | Rachel Maltby | 25 March 2007 (aged 17) | (The Football Association) Aston Villa |
| 4 | MF | Laila Harbert | 3 January 2007 (aged 17) | (The Football Association) Arsenal |
| 5 | DF | Simone Sherwood | 4 January 2007 (aged 17) | (The Football Association) Leicester City |
| 6 | DF | Cecily Wellesley-Smith | 4 January 2007 (aged 17) | (The Football Association) Oxford United |
| 7 | MF | Erica Parkinson | 18 April 2008 (aged 16) | (Portuguese Football Federation) Valadares Gaia |
| 8 | MF | Omotara Junaid | 4 October 2007 (aged 16) | (The Football Association) Arsenal |
| 9 | FW | Isabella Fisher | 14 May 2007 (aged 16) | (The Football Association) Arsenal |
| 10 | MF | Vera Jones | 18 February 2008 (aged 16) | (Football Association of Wales) Barry Town United |
| 11 | FW | Lola Brown | 31 October 2007 (aged 16) | (The Football Association) Chelsea |
| 12 | DF | Sophie Harrison | 17 July 2007 (aged 16) | (The Football Association) Arsenal |
| 13 | GK | Rebekah Dowsett | 31 May 2007 (aged 16) | (The Football Association) Leicester City |
| 14 | MF | Emily Cassap | 11 May 2007 (aged 16) | (The Football Association) Sunderland |
| 15 | DF | Niamh Peacock | 22 March 2008 (aged 16) | (The Football Association) Arsenal |
| 16 | FW | Olivia Johnson | 4 March 2007 (aged 17) | (The Football Association) Brighton & Hove Albion |
| 17 | DF | Eva Gray | 20 November 2007 (aged 16) | (The Football Association) Arsenal |
| 18 | FW | Mia Endacott | 5 September 2007 (aged 16) | (The Football Association) Plymouth Argyle |
| 19 | FW | Isabel Hebard | 27 October 2008 (aged 15) | (The Football Association) Devon ETC |
| 20 | FW | Jane Oboavwoduo | 29 December 2009 (aged 14) | (The Football Association) Manchester City |

=== France ===
The final squad was announced on 22 April 2024.

Head coach: (France) Cécile Locatelli

| No. | Pos. | Player | Date of birth (age) | Club |
|---|---|---|---|---|
| 1 | GK | Ambre Bouchard | 14 May 2007 (aged 16) | (French Football Federation) Lens |
| 2 | DF | Maëlle Richelandet | 16 September 2007 (aged 16) | (French Football Federation) Dijon |
| 3 | DF | Juliane Denizot | 15 October 2007 (aged 16) | (French Football Federation) Dijon |
| 4 | DF | Valentine Sellenet | 11 February 2007 (aged 17) | (French Football Federation) Olympique Lyonnais |
| 5 | DF | Olivia Romiti | 19 March 2007 (aged 17) | (French Football Federation) Paris Saint-Germain |
| 6 | MF | Anaïs Ebayilin | 17 December 2007 (aged 16) | (French Football Federation) Paris Saint-Germain |
| 7 | FW | Célia Chabod | 28 February 2007 (aged 17) | (French Football Federation) Dijon |
| 8 | MF | Ambre Ouazar | 9 April 2007 (aged 17) | (French Football Federation) Olympique Lyonnais |
| 9 | FW | Auryane Abdourahim | 17 October 2007 (aged 16) | (French Football Federation) Paris Saint-Germain |
| 10 | MF | Lina Gay | 17 November 2007 (aged 16) | (French Football Federation) Dijon |
| 11 | FW | Justine Rouquet | 6 June 2007 (aged 16) | (French Football Federation) Montpellier |
| 12 | DF | Médina Belaïd | 16 March 2008 (aged 16) | (French Football Federation) Paris Saint-Germain |
| 13 | DF | Élise Jean | 27 July 2007 (aged 16) | (French Football Federation) Montpellier |
| 14 | FW | Rachael Adedini | 20 June 2009 (aged 14) | (The Football Association) Manchester United |
| 15 | MF | Léa Sylejmani | 3 June 2007 (aged 16) | (French Football Federation) Strasbourg |
| 16 | GK | Ceylin Yilmaz | 9 March 2007 (aged 17) | (French Football Federation) Montpellier |
| 17 | MF | Kenza Dufour | 3 August 2007 (aged 16) | (French Football Federation) Paris FC |
| 18 | DF | Kentissia Bacoul-Juillard | 2 November 2007 (aged 16) | (French Football Federation) Montpellier |
| 19 | FW | Djenna-Léna Tene | 10 August 2007 (aged 16) | (French Football Federation) Saint-Étienne |
| 20 | FW | Mymithye Bironien | 3 December 2007 (aged 16) | (French Football Federation) Toulouse |

=== Norway ===
The final squad was announced on 19 April 2024.

Head coach: (Norway) Børje Sørensen

| No. | Pos. | Player | Date of birth (age) | Club |
|---|---|---|---|---|
| 1 | GK | Hanna Krog | 15 November 2007 (aged 16) | (Norwegian Football Federation) Rosenborg |
| 2 | DF | Ina Raaum Andreassen | 6 March 2007 (aged 17) | (Norwegian Football Federation) HamKam |
| 3 | DF | Nora Mjøs | 21 February 2007 (aged 17) | (Norwegian Football Federation) Åsane |
| 4 | DF | Josefine Lefdal | 24 April 2007 (aged 17) | (Norwegian Football Federation) Kolbotn |
| 5 | DF | Andrea Buberg | 21 February 2007 (aged 17) | (Norwegian Football Federation) Tiller |
| 7 | MF | Malin Dalsgård | 3 February 2007 (aged 17) | (Norwegian Football Federation) Arna-Bjørnar |
| 8 | MF | Linnea Moen | 31 December 2007 (aged 16) | (Norwegian Football Federation) HamKam |
| 9 | FW | Christina Herseth | 10 September 2008 (aged 15) | (Norwegian Football Federation) LSK Kvinner |
| 10 | FW | Anny Kerim-Lindland | 21 March 2007 (aged 17) | (Norwegian Football Federation) Start |
| 11 | MF | Estella Turflinger | 6 May 2007 (aged 16) | (Norwegian Football Federation) Øvrevoll |
| 12 | GK | Maria Kroken | 17 January 2008 (aged 16) | (Norwegian Football Federation) Lyn |
| 13 | FW | Thale Hauge | 26 July 2007 (aged 16) | (Norwegian Football Federation) Bodø/Glimt |
| 14 | DF | Estella Turflinger | 6 May 2007 (aged 16) | (Norwegian Football Federation) Øvrevoll |
| 15 | FW | Elle Ulstein | 21 May 2007 (aged 16) | (Norwegian Football Federation) KFUM |
| 16 | DF | Selma Jordfald | 3 October 2007 (aged 16) | (Norwegian Football Federation) KFUM |
| 17 | MF | Tomine Enger | 12 April 2008 (aged 16) | (Norwegian Football Federation) Start |
| 18 | FW | Linnea Haugen | 21 March 2007 (aged 17) | (Norwegian Football Federation) Kolbotn |
| 19 | MF | Karna Sødahl | 1 December 2008 (aged 15) | (Norwegian Football Federation) Rosenborg |
| 20 | FW | Mia Johannesen | 17 April 2007 (aged 17) | (Norwegian Football Federation) Sogndal |
| 21 | MF | Heidi Steinsbø | 24 July 2008 (aged 15) | (Norwegian Football Federation) Brann |

=== Sweden ===
The final squad was announced on 17 April 2024. Thea Staffansson was replaced by Nathalie Staaf due to injury on 30 April 2024.

Head coach: (Sweden) Lovisa Delby

| No. | Pos. | Player | Date of birth (age) | Club |
|---|---|---|---|---|
| 1 | GK | Saga Andersson | 25 July 2007 (aged 16) | (Swedish Football Association) KIF Örebro |
| 2 | DF | Wilma Ceder | 13 September 2007 (aged 16) | (Swedish Football Association) Malmö FF |
| 3 | DF | Alice Broman | 28 January 2007 (aged 17) | (Swedish Football Association) IF Elfsborg |
| 4 | MF | Fabienne Bartholdson | 5 November 2007 (aged 16) | (Swedish Football Association) FC Djursholm |
| 5 | DF | Thindra Mattsson | 22 October 2007 (aged 16) | (Swedish Football Association) IK Uppsala |
| 6 | DF | Nathalie Staaf | 1 January 2007 (aged 17) | (Swedish Football Association) BK Häcken FF |
| 7 | DF | Paula Broddner Klingspor | 15 April 2007 (aged 17) | (Swedish Football Association) IF Brommapojkarna |
| 8 | DF | Freja Lindwall | 9 June 2007 (aged 16) | (Swedish Football Association) IFK Norrköping |
| 9 | MF | Ella Alexandersson | 21 February 2007 (aged 17) | (Swedish Football Association) Jitex BK |
| 10 | MF | Maja Nilsson | 4 June 2007 (aged 16) | (Swedish Football Association) Husqvarna FF |
| 11 | MF | Augusta Priks | 18 June 2007 (aged 16) | (Swedish Football Association) IF Brommapojkarna |
| 12 | GK | Izabelle Bardosen | 4 May 2007 (aged 17) | (Swedish Football Association) Umeå IK |
| 13 | MF | Ella Lundin | 21 August 2007 (aged 16) | (Swedish Football Association) Linköping FC |
| 14 | MF | Lova Sternvik | 15 February 2007 (aged 17) | (Swedish Football Association) BK Häcken FF |
| 15 | MF | Carmen Cernjul | 14 June 2007 (aged 16) | (Swedish Football Association) Hammarby IF |
| 16 | MF | Saron Berhe | 18 October 2007 (aged 16) | (Swedish Football Association) IFK Göteborg |
| 17 | FW | Moa Svensson | 2 March 2007 (aged 17) | (Swedish Football Association) Kärra KIF |
| 18 | MF | Isabelle Goldmann | 20 January 2007 (aged 17) | (Swedish Football Association) Umeå IK |
| 19 | FW | Felicia Schröder | 13 April 2007 (aged 17) | (Swedish Football Association) BK Häcken FF |
| 20 | FW | Nova Rolfsson | 18 April 2007 (aged 17) | (Swedish Football Association) Malmö FF |

== Group B ==
=== Belgium ===
The final squad was announced on 30 April 2024.

Head coach: (Belgium) Lenie Onzia

| No. | Pos. | Player | Date of birth (age) | Club |
|---|---|---|---|---|
| 1 | GK | Aude Waldbillig | 2 June 2007 (aged 16) | (Royal Belgian Football Association) RSC Anderlecht |
| 2 | DF | Louize Haentjens | 27 July 2008 (aged 15) | (Royal Belgian Football Association) Oud-Heverlee Leuven |
| 3 | DF | Chionne Bonny | 4 February 2007 (aged 17) | (Royal Belgian Football Association) Club YLA |
| 5 | DF | Kiki Peeters | 9 December 2007 (aged 16) | (Royal Belgian Football Association) Oud-Heverlee Leuven |
| 6 | MF | Romy Wenning | 25 June 2007 (aged 16) | (Royal Belgian Football Association) Club YLA |
| 7 | MF | Megan Watson | 3 July 2007 (aged 16) | (Royal Belgian Football Association) Juventus Academy Shape |
| 8 | DF | Flo Hermans | 6 January 2008 (aged 16) | (Royal Belgian Football Association) Oud-Heverlee Leuven |
| 9 | FW | Manon Heremans | 22 September 2008 (aged 15) | (Royal Belgian Football Association) Oud-Heverlee Leuven |
| 10 | FW | Oliwia Loeman | 18 August 2007 (aged 16) | (Royal Belgian Football Association) Oud-Heverlee Leuven |
| 11 | MF | Finne Van Looveren | 28 August 2007 (aged 16) | (Royal Belgian Football Association) Oud-Heverlee Leuven |
| 12 | GK | Marie Pues | 22 May 2008 (aged 15) | (Royal Belgian Football Association) Club YLA |
| 13 | MF | Axelle Bamps | 29 June 2007 (aged 16) | (Royal Belgian Football Association) Oud-Heverlee Leuven |
| 14 | MF | Alexia Dooms | 4 June 2007 (aged 16) | (Royal Belgian Football Association) FC Fémina White Star Woluwe |
| 15 | MF | Fienelotte Valcke | 13 September 2007 (aged 16) | (Royal Belgian Football Association) SV Zulte Waregem |
| 16 | FW | Fleur Heyman | 5 March 2007 (aged 17) | (Royal Belgian Football Association) KAA Gent |
| 17 | DF | Lise Bal | 8 February 2007 (aged 17) | (Royal Belgian Football Association) KV Mechelen |
| 18 | DF | Febe Van Herreweghe | 18 June 2007 (aged 16) | (Royal Belgian Football Association) Club YLA |
| 19 | MF | Oona Careel | 19 July 2007 (aged 16) | (Royal Belgian Football Association) Club YLA |
| 20 | FW | Lola Vanluyten | 7 August 2007 (aged 16) | (Royal Belgian Football Association) Standard Liège |
| 22 | FW | Clementine Reynebeau | 19 February 2008 (aged 16) | (Royal Belgian Football Association) Club YLA |

=== Poland ===
The final squad was announced on 17 April 2024.

Head coach: (Poland) Marcin Kasprowicz

| No. | Pos. | Player | Date of birth (age) | Club |
|---|---|---|---|---|
| 1 | GK | Julia Woźniak | 15 April 2007 (aged 17) | (Polish Football Association) Medyk Konin |
| 2 | DF | Oliwia Łapińska | 9 February 2007 (aged 17) | (Polish Football Association) Orlen Gdańsk |
| 3 | FW | Aisha Nsangou | 2 April 2007 (aged 17) | (The Football Association) Everton |
| 4 | DF | Magda Piekarska | 9 September 2007 (aged 16) | (Polish Football Association) Rekord Bielsko-Biała |
| 5 | MF | Anna Krakowiak | 16 February 2007 (aged 17) | (Polish Football Association) Czarni Sosnowiec |
| 6 | DF | Iga Witkowska | 27 March 2007 (aged 17) | (Polish Football Association) Rekord Bielsko-Biała |
| 7 | MF | Krystyna Flis | 4 January 2007 (aged 17) | (Polish Football Association) Śląsk Wrocław |
| 8 | MF | Zuzanna Witek | 19 September 2007 (aged 16) | (Polish Football Association) Czarni Sosnowiec |
| 9 | MF | Anna Skrzypczyk | 8 November 2007 (aged 16) | (Polish Football Association) Orlen Gdańsk |
| 10 | DF | Maja Zielińska | 11 August 2007 (aged 16) | (Polish Football Association) Diamenty Warszawa |
| 11 | FW | Julia Ostrowska | 16 September 2008 (aged 15) | (Polish Football Association) Górnik Łęczna |
| 13 | DF | Zofia Pągowska | 25 April 2007 (aged 17) | (Polish Football Association) SMS Łódź |
| 14 | FW | Oliwia Związek | 22 June 2007 (aged 16) | (Polish Football Association) Śląsk Wrocław |
| 15 | MF | Weronika Araśniewicz | 15 March 2008 (aged 16) | (Polish Football Association) Diamenty Warszawa |
| 16 | MF | Małgorzata Rogus | 15 April 2008 (aged 16) | (Polish Football Association) Ślęza Wrocław |
| 17 | MF | Aleksandra Kuśmierczyk | 27 January 2007 (aged 17) | (Polish Football Association) Pogoń Szczecin |
| 18 | DF | Martyna Bartczak | 25 June 2007 (aged 16) | (Polish Football Association) Sportis Bydgoszcz |
| 19 | FW | Kinga Wyrwas | 21 January 2007 (aged 17) | (Polish Football Association) Sportis Bydgoszcz |
| 20 | MF | Lena Marczak | 11 March 2007 (aged 17) | (Polish Football Association) Górnik Łęczna |
| 22 | GK | Hanna Wieczerzak | 29 May 2007 (aged 16) | (Polish Football Association) Śląsk Wrocław |

=== Portugal ===
The final squad was announced on 23 April 2024.

Head coach: (Portugal) Carlos Sacadura

| No. | Pos. | Player | Date of birth (age) | Club |
|---|---|---|---|---|
| 1 | GK | Rafaela Mendonça | 1 February 2007 (aged 17) | (Portuguese Football Federation) Sporting CP |
| 2 | DF | Iara Lobo | 16 January 2008 (aged 16) | (Portuguese Football Federation) Sporting CP |
| 3 | DF | Carolina Machado | 31 January 2007 (aged 17) | (Portuguese Football Federation) Länk FC Vilaverdense |
| 4 | DF | Victória Leite | 9 July 2007 (aged 16) | (Portuguese Football Federation) SC Braga |
| 5 | DF | Francisca Castro | 10 July 2008 (aged 15) | (Portuguese Football Federation) SC Braga |
| 6 | MF | Joana Valente | 3 January 2007 (aged 17) | (Portuguese Football Federation) SL Benfica |
| 7 | FW | Cintia Martins | 29 June 2007 (aged 16) | (Italian Football Federation) AS Roma |
| 8 | MF | Rita Melo | 7 December 2007 (aged 16) | (Portuguese Football Federation) SC Braga |
| 9 | MF | Mélanie Florentino | 17 July 2007 (aged 16) | (Portuguese Football Federation) SL Benfica |
| 10 | MF | Matilde Vaz | 12 February 2007 (aged 17) | (Portuguese Football Federation) Sporting CP |
| 11 | MF | Leticia Silva | 6 August 2007 (aged 16) | (Portuguese Football Federation) GD Ilha |
| 12 | GK | Thaís Lima | 11 April 2008 (aged 16) | (Portuguese Football Federation) SL Benfica |
| 13 | DF | Carolina Simões | 13 March 2008 (aged 16) | (Portuguese Football Federation) SL Benfica |
| 14 | MF | Sofia Liu | 19 July 2007 (aged 16) | (Portuguese Football Federation) SL Benfica |
| 15 | DF | Matilde Sousa | 5 June 2007 (aged 16) | (Portuguese Football Federation) Sporting CP |
| 16 | DF | Luena Ferreira | 11 December 2007 (aged 16) | (Portuguese Football Federation) SL Benfica |
| 17 | MF | Carolina Tristão | 20 November 2008 (aged 15) | (Portuguese Football Federation) SC Braga |
| 18 | DF | Núria Ribeiro | 20 January 2007 (aged 17) | (Portuguese Football Federation) SC Rio Tinto |
| 19 | FW | Joana Reis | 7 February 2007 (aged 17) | (Portuguese Football Federation) Sporting CP |
| 20 | MF | Matilde Nave | 17 November 2007 (aged 16) | (Portuguese Football Federation) Sporting CP |

=== Spain ===
The final squad was announced on 24 April 2024.

Head coach: (Spain) Kenio Gonzalo

| No. | Pos. | Player | Date of birth (age) | Club |
|---|---|---|---|---|
| 1 | GK | Laia López | 29 January 2007 (aged 17) | (Royal Spanish Football Federation) Real Madrid |
| 2 | DF | Martina González | 9 December 2007 (aged 16) | (Royal Spanish Football Federation) FC Barcelona |
| 3 | DF | Nerea Carmona | 19 January 2007 (aged 17) | (Royal Spanish Football Federation) Levante Las Planas |
| 4 | DF | Claudia de la Cuerda | 5 June 2007 (aged 16) | (Royal Spanish Football Federation) Real Madrid |
| 5 | DF | Amaya García | 10 June 2007 (aged 16) | (Royal Spanish Football Federation) Real Madrid |
| 6 | MF | Lorena Cubo | 23 January 2007 (aged 17) | (Royal Spanish Football Federation) FC Barcelona |
| 7 | FW | Noa Ortega | 12 February 2007 (aged 17) | (Royal Spanish Football Federation) FC Barcelona |
| 8 | MF | Adriana Folgado | 1 April 2007 (aged 17) | (Royal Spanish Football Federation) Real Madrid |
| 9 | FW | Celia Segura | 10 March 2007 (aged 17) | (Royal Spanish Football Federation) FC Barcelona |
| 10 | MF | Ainoa Gómez | 13 April 2007 (aged 17) | (Royal Spanish Football Federation) FC Barcelona |
| 11 | MF | Irune Dorado | 22 March 2008 (aged 16) | (Royal Spanish Football Federation) Real Madrid |
| 12 | DF | Aiara Agirrezabala | 2 October 2008 (aged 15) | (Royal Spanish Football Federation) Real Sociedad |
| 13 | GK | Ziara Vega | 30 August 2007 (aged 16) | (Royal Spanish Football Federation) Athletic Club |
| 14 | FW | Lua Arufe | 6 September 2008 (aged 15) | (Royal Spanish Football Federation) Victoria CF |
| 15 | DF | Silvia Cristóbal | 1 May 2008 (aged 16) | (Royal Spanish Football Federation) Real Madrid |
| 16 | MF | Clara Serrajordi | 7 December 2007 (aged 16) | (Royal Spanish Football Federation) FC Barcelona |
| 17 | FW | Emma Moreno | 2 May 2007 (aged 17) | (Royal Spanish Football Federation) Atlético Madrid |
| 18 | MF | Lucía Rivas | 23 August 2007 (aged 16) | (Royal Spanish Football Federation) Deportivo de La Coruña |
| 19 | FW | Alba Cerrato | 1 January 2007 (aged 17) | (Royal Spanish Football Federation) Sevilla FC |
| 20 | FW | Natalia Escot | 8 February 2007 (aged 17) | (Royal Spanish Football Federation) Levante Las Planas |
