= Irati Martín =

Spanish footballer (born 2003)

Personal information
- Full name: Irati Martín Rodríguez
- Date of birth: 6 July 2003 (age 23)
- Place of birth: Durango, Biscay, Spain
- Position: Forward

Team information
- Current team: Eibar
- Number: 29

Youth career
- 2015–2018: Ezkurdi
- 2018–2019: Eibar

Senior career*
Years	Team	Apps	(Gls)
2019–	Eibar	4	(0)
- * Club domestic league appearances and goals as of 20:40, 30 October 2021 (UTC)

Irati Martín Rodríguez (born 6 July 2003) is a Spanish footballer who plays as a forward for Eibar.

== Club career ==
Martín started her career at Landako school, then she went to Ezkurdi.
