= 2026–27 Segunda Federación (women) =

Spanish women soccer 2nd division 26-27 season

Segunda Federación
- Season: 2026–27
- Dates: 5 September 2026 – 2 May 2027
- Teams: 42 teams (3 groups)
- Matches: 189
- Goals: 541 (2.86 per match)
- Top goalscorer: 4 players (7 goals)
- All statistics correct as of 15 November 2026.

The 2026–27 Segunda Federación de Futbol Femenino is the 5th edition of the third highest league tier of women's football in Spain using that name.

== Summary ==
42 teams are taking part in the league dispatched through 3 different groups of 14, according to their locations in Spain. For this 2026-2027 season, the first 5 teams of each group (or the highest eligible club in the event of a team being a reserve team) will be promoted to the 2027-2028 Primera Federación. No play-off promotion will be taking place, as a new format of the Primera Federación will involve 2 groups of 14 teams in 2027-28. Additionally, the last 2 teams of each group will be relegated to the 2027-2028 Tercera Federación.

== Teams ==
42 teams participating are split into 3 different groups of 14 teams each.

=== Changes ===
The following teams changed division since the 2025–26 season.

To Segunda Federación
▼ Relegated from Primera Federación
- SE AEM
- Europa
- Real Betis
- Real Oviedo
▲ Promoted from Tercera Federación
- CA Osasuna B
- AD Villaviciosa de Odón
- Valencia CF B
- Victoria CF
- UD Almería
- FC Barcelona C
- CD Arratia
- EMF Fuensalida
- Real Murcia CF

From Segunda Federación
▲ Promoted to Primera Federación
- Athletic Club B
- Real Unión Tenerife
- Sport Extremadura
- Real Sociedad B (through playoff)
▼ Relegated to Tercera Federación
- CD Olímpico de León
- Atlético Villalonga FF
- SE AEM B (Note: Relegated due to the relegation of SE AEM from Primera to Segunda.)
- Atlético Madrid C (Note: Relegated due to administrative reasons.)
- Dinamo Guadalajara
- Futbolellas CFF
- CD Juan Grande
- Real Betis B
- CF Unión Viera
- Real Avilés CF (not relegated) (Note: Not relegated due to the relegation of Atlético Madrid C.)
- Rayo Vallecano (not relegated) (Note: Not relegated due to the relegation of SE AEM B.)

== Group 1 ==
=== Standings ===
Pos	Team	Pld	W	D	L	GF	GA	GD	Pts	Promotion, qualification or relegation
1	Dépor Abanca B	9	7	1	1	27	6	+21	22	Promotion to Primera Federación
2	Real Oviedo	9	5	3	1	17	3	+14	18	Promotion to Primera Federación
3	Eibar B	9	5	3	1	12	4	+8	18	Promotion to Primera Federación
4	Sporting Gijón	9	4	4	1	14	9	+5	16	Promotion to Primera Federación
5	Celta Vigo	9	4	2	3	18	14	+4	14	Promotion to Primera Federación
6	Real Avilés	9	4	2	3	12	13	−1	14	
7	Burgos CF	9	3	3	3	15	5	+10	12	
8	Arratia	9	4	0	5	9	14	−5	12	
9	Racing Club	9	2	3	4	9	14	−5	9	
10	Osasuna B	9	3	0	6	7	20	−13	9	
11	Madrid CFF B	9	2	2	5	15	17	−2	8	
12	Victoria CF	9	2	2	5	12	19	−7	8	
13	Bizkerre	9	2	2	5	9	17	−8	8	Relegation to Tercera Federación
14	Rayo Vallecano	9	2	1	6	6	27	−21	7	Relegation to Tercera Federación

Updated to match(es) played on 15 November 2026. Source: RFEF
Rules for classification: 1) Points; 2) Head-to-head points; 3) Goal difference; 4) Number of goals scored

=== Results ===
Home \ Away	ARR	AVI	BIZ	BUR	CEL	DEP	EIB	MAD	OSA	OVI	RAC	RAY	SPO	VIC
Arratia			2–0		0–3	1–3					0–1			1–4
Real Avilés							1–1						1–1	1–0
Bizkerre	2–1	2–3		0–2					0–1		1–0			1–1
Burgos CF	0–1						0–1	1–1			0–0	7–0		
Celta Vigo		2–1				0–5			5–0			5–0	0–0	
Dépor Abanca B		3–2						4–1	3–0		4–0			
Eibar B					3–1	2–0				0–0				2–1
Madrid CFF B	0–1				2–2								2–3	5–0
Osasuna B	1–2	0–1		0–4				2–0		0–3				
Real Oviedo		3–0	5–0	0–0	3–0			1–2						
Racing Club							0–3	3–2		1–1		4–0	0–0	
Rayo Vallecano			2–4			0–5	0–0			0–1				
Sporting Gijón			1–1	2–1			1–0					1–3		
Victoria CF						0–0			2–3		3–1		1–5	

Updated to match(es) played on 15 November 2026. Source: RFEF
Legend: Blue = home team win; Yellow = draw; Red = away team win.

=== Top goalscorers ===
As of 15 November 2026

Rank	Player	Team	Goals
1	(Spain) Antía Mayo	Déportivo Abanca B	7
2	(Spain) Candela Vázquez	Victoria CF	6
2	(Spain) Nati Cano	Real Oviedo	6
2	(Spain) Andrea Albiol	Celta Vigo	6
5	(Spain) Izaro Tores	Burgos CF	4
5	(Spain) Daniela Valbuena	Dépor Abanca B	4
5	(Spain) Nuria Torres	Real Avilés	4

== Group 2 ==
=== Standings ===
Pos	Team	Pld	W	D	L	GF	GA	GD	Pts	Promotion, qualification or relegation
1	Ona Sant Adrià	9	8	0	1	29	6	+23	24	Promotion to Primera Federación
2	Barcelona C	9	6	2	1	25	9	+16	20	Promotion to Primera Federación
3	Espanyol B	9	5	1	3	16	9	+7	16	Promotion to Primera Federación
4	SE AEM	9	4	3	2	8	4	+4	15	Promotion to Primera Federación
5	Huesca	9	4	3	2	10	7	+3	15	Promotion to Primera Federación
6	Zaragoza CFF	9	4	3	2	11	10	+1	15	
7	Baleares	9	3	4	2	15	11	+4	13	
8	Europa	9	5	1	3	12	8	+4	13 (Note: The team was given a 3 points deduction, after the player Martina Rojo failed to comply a one game ban during matchday 1.)	
9	Valencia B	9	3	2	4	10	11	−1	11	
10	Elche	9	3	2	4	7	9	−2	11	
11	CD Samper	9	2	3	4	6	14	−8	9	
12	Levante B	9	1	2	6	6	17	−11	5	
13	Villaviciosa	9	1	0	8	10	26	−16	3	Relegation to Tercera Federación
14	Real Murcia	9	0	2	7	4	28	−24	2	Relegation to Tercera Federación

Updated to match(es) played on 15 November 2026. Source: RFEF
Rules for classification: 1) Points; 2) Head-to-head points; 3) Goal difference; 4) Number of goals scored

=== Results ===
Home \ Away	AEM	BAL	BAR	ELC	ESP	EUR	HUE	LEV	MUR	ONA	SAM	VAL	VIL	ZAR
SE AEM						0–0	1–0		4–0					0–1
Baleares			1–3	0–0				4–1		2–3		4–2		
Barcelona C	3–0				2–1								4–0	2–2
Elche	0–1				1–2	2–0		1–1					2–1	
Espanyol B		0–0				1–0		2–0	6–0		4–1			
Europa							3–1	1–0		3–1	2–0			
Huesca			1–1	1–0								1–0	3–0	1–1
Levante B	0–2	2–2					0–1			0–4		2–0		
Real Murcia			0–5				1–1				0–1	0–0		0–1
Ona Sant Adrià				3–0	3–0				6–0				2–0	
CD Samper	0–0	0–0								0–4		2–3	2–1	
Valencia B	0–0		3–1	0–1	2–0									
Villaviciosa		1–4				1–3			4–3					2–3
Zaragoza CFF		0–2				2–0				1–3	0–0			

Updated to match(es) played on 15 November 2026. Source: RFEF
Legend: Blue = home team win; Yellow = draw; Red = away team win.

=== Top goalscorers ===
As of 15 November 2026

Rank	Player	Team	Goals
1	(Netherlands) Isabelle Hoekstra	Ona Sant Adrià	7
2	(Spain) Nuria Pomer	Baleares	5
2	(Spain) Aitana Fernández	Ona Sant Adrià	5
4	(Morocco) Shara Codina	Espanyol B	4
4	(Spain) Cristina García	Valencia B	4
4	(Spain) Ivet Franch	Barcelona C	4

=== Hat-tricks ===
Player	For	Against	Minutes	Score after goals	Result	Date	Round
(Spain) Aitana Fernández Reyes	Ona Sant Adrià	CD Samper	43', 50', 67'	0–2, 0–3, 0–4	0-4 (A)	14 November 2026	9

(H) – Home; (A) – Away
^{4} – Player scored four goals.

== Group 3 ==
=== Standings ===
Pos	Team	Pld	W	D	L	GF	GA	GD	Pts	Promotion, qualification or relegation
1	Argual	9	8	1	0	25	2	+23	25	Promotion to Primera Federación
2	Real Betis	9	6	3	0	25	8	+17	21	Promotion to Primera Federación
3	Sporting de Huelva	9	6	2	1	21	9	+12	20	Promotion to Primera Federación
4	Málaga	9	6	2	1	20	8	+12	20	Promotion to Primera Federación
5	Femarguín	9	6	1	2	18	13	+5	19	Promotion to Primera Federación
6	Getafe	9	4	1	4	13	14	−1	13	
7	Olympia Las Rozas	9	2	5	2	13	14	−1	11	
8	Córdoba	9	3	1	5	10	19	−9	10	
9	Pozuelo Alarcón	9	2	3	4	9	12	−3	9	
10	Unión Viera	9	1	5	3	9	15	−6	8	
11	Guiniguada Apolinario	9	2	1	6	9	17	−8	7	
12	Cacereño	9	2	1	6	9	18	−9	7	
13	Almería	9	1	2	6	8	20	−12	5	Relegation to Tercera Federación
14	Fuensalida	9	0	0	9	3	23	−20	0	Relegation to Tercera Federación

Updated to match(es) played on 15 November 2026. Source: RFEF
Rules for classification: 1) Points; 2) Head-to-head points; 3) Goal difference; 4) Number of goals scored

=== Results ===
Home \ Away	ALM	ARG	BET	CAC	COR	FEM	FUE	GET	GUI	HUL	MAL	OLY	POZ	VIE
Almería						2–3		1–3	1–0			0–2		1–1
Argual	1–0						3–0			3–0		1–1		
Real Betis	1–1			4–0	6–0							3–2		
Cacereño	4–2				1–2						0–3	1–2	1–1	
Córdoba		0–2					1–0			1–2	0–2		1–2	
Femarguín		0–3	1–3	2–0				2–1						
Fuensalida			0–3			2–6		0–2			0–1			0–1
Getafe		0–5							2–0		1–3		2–0	1–1
Guiniguada Apolinario				0–2	2–3	1–1	2–1			1–5				
Sporting de Huelva			2–2	2–0			4–0	2–1						3–0
Málaga		1–2							2–0				3–0	3–3
Olympia Las Rozas					2–2				0–3	1–1	2–2			
Pozuelo Alarcón	3–0		1–2			0–1						1–1		
Unión Viera		0–3	1–1			1–2							1–1	

Updated to match(es) played on 15 November 2026. Source: RFEF
Legend: Blue = home team win; Yellow = draw; Red = away team win.

=== Top goalscorers ===
As of 15 November 2026

Rank	Player	Team	Goals
1	(Spain) María Ruiz	Real Betis	7
1	(Spain) María José Pérez	CD Argual	7
3	(Spain) Noe Correro	Femarguín	6
3	(Spain) Claudia Riumalló	Real Betis	6
5	(Spain) Belén Peralta	Olympia Las Rozas	5
5	(Spain) Lara Antunes	Getafe	5
5	(Spain) Milagros González	Cacereño	5
5	(Spain) Ana González	Real Betis	5
5	(Spain) Alba Quintana	Sporting de Huelva	5

=== Hat-tricks ===
Player	For	Against	Minutes	Score after goals	Result	Date	Round
(Spain) Clàudia Riumalló	Real Betis	Cacereño	22', 38', 44'	1–0, 2–0, 3–0	4-0 (H)	20 September 2026	3

(H) – Home; (A) – Away
^{4} – Player scored four goals.
