= 2023 UEFA Women's Under-17 Championship squads =

The following is a list of squads for each national team competing at the 2023 UEFA Women's Under-17 Championship in Estonia. Each national team had to submit a squad of 20 players born on or after 1 January 2006.

== Group A ==
=== Estonia ===
Head coach: Aleksandra Ševoldajeva

On 8 May 2023, a preliminary 23-player squad was announced. Four days later, the final 20-player squad was announced. On the day of the beginning of the tournament, Pilleriin Pohlak withdrew for health reasons and was replaced by Karmen Vapper.

No.	Pos.	Player	Date of birth (age)	Caps	Goals	Club
1	GK	Liisa Liimets	4 April 2006 (aged 17)	18	0	(Estonia) Viimsi
2	DF	Viktoria Toding	28 September 2006 (aged 16)	19	0	(Estonia) Flora
3	DF	Anni Iiris Ilisson	14 February 2007 (aged 16)	16	0	(Estonia) Tabasalu
4	DF	Ranele Valk	28 July 2007 (aged 15)	7	0	(Estonia) Viimsi
5	DF	Anna Mariin Juksar	2 June 2006 (aged 16)	21	0	(Estonia) Saku Sporting
6	DF	Karola Purgats	6 April 2006 (aged 17)	7	1	(Estonia) Flora
7	DF	Liisi Karilaid	22 September 2006 (aged 16)	16	0	(Estonia) Tabasalu
8	DF	Aliset Esna	24 July 2006 (aged 16)	3	0	(Spain) Cambrils
9	MF	Mirtel Kalamees	16 December 2006 (aged 16)	5	0	(Estonia) Elva
10	MF	Aleksandra Kelli	11 August 2006 (aged 16)	21	8	(Estonia) Tammeka
12	GK	Katarina Elisabeth Käpa	16 March 2006 (aged 17)	8	0	(Estonia) Flora
13	MF	Dajana Smirnova	21 March 2007 (aged 16)	9	0	(Estonia) Flora
14	MF	Mia-Lisette Sarapik	15 October 2006 (aged 16)	24	1	(Estonia) Tabasalu
15	FW	Kätrin Välba	17 August 2006 (aged 16)	17	1	(Estonia) Viimsi
16	MF	Lola Boberg	8 December 2007 (aged 15)	2	0	(Estonia) Tabasalu
17	MF	Karmen Vapper	16 August 2007 (aged 15)	3	0	(Estonia) Flora
18	DF	Annegret Kala	3 May 2006 (aged 17)	17	0	(Estonia) Tammeka
19	FW	Elisabeth Õispuu	19 November 2007 (aged 15)	17	1	(Estonia) Flora
20	MF	Egle-Eliise Kurg	4 May 2007 (aged 16)	12	1	(Estonia) Flora
23	FW	Jane Mirjam	28 July 2006 (aged 16)	24	3	(Estonia) Vaprus

=== Germany ===
Head coach: Sabine Loderer

The final 20-player squad was announced on 14 May 2023.

No.	Pos.	Player	Date of birth (age)	Caps	Goals	Club
1	GK	Thea Farwick	9 June 2006 (aged 16)	7	0	(Germany) SV Meppen
2	DF	Nadine Bitzer	30 May 2006 (aged 16)	10	0	(Germany) 1899 Hoffenheim
3	MF	Lisa Baum	25 November 2006 (aged 16)	9	1	(Germany) Hamburger SV
4	DF	Emily Wallrabenstein	9 September 2006 (aged 16)	18	0	(Germany) Eintracht Frankfurt
5	MF	Melina Bünning	29 July 2006 (aged 16)	10	1	(Germany) Hamburger SV
6	MF	Lilith Schmidt	8 June 2006 (aged 16)	16	1	(Germany) 1. FC Köln
7	MF	Melina Krüger	5 January 2006 (aged 17)	19	4	(Germany) Magdeburger FFC
8	MF	Marina Scholz	18 February 2006 (aged 17)	9	4	(Germany) 1. FC Nürnberg
9	MF	Georgia Stanti	14 May 2006 (aged 17)	0	0	(Germany) Eintracht Frankfurt
10	MF	Laila Portella	7 May 2007 (aged 16)	12	3	(Germany) FC Esslingen
11	MF	Estrella Merino Gonzalez	19 November 2006 (aged 16)	11	10	(Germany) Bayer Leverkusen
12	GK	Sina Tölzel	5 October 2006 (aged 16)	0	0	(Germany) 1. FC Nürnberg
13	DF	Leni Wileschek	13 September 2006 (aged 16)	8	1	(Germany) 1899 Hoffenheim
14	DF	Merita Gashi	10 March 2006 (aged 17)	4	0	(Germany) Bayern Munich
15	FW	Delice Boboy	30 October 2006 (aged 16)	4	3	(Germany) Bayer Leverkusen
16	MF	Milena Röder	2 July 2006 (aged 16)	7	1	(Germany) SV Bardenbach
17	MF	Maj Schneider	29 August 2007 (aged 15)	10	1	(Germany) SC Freiburg
18	FW	Olesja Arslan	5 January 2006 (aged 17)	2	0	(Germany) 1. FC Köln
19	FW	Melina Walheim	22 March 2006 (aged 17)	8	3	(Germany) SGS Essen
20	DF	Lina Backhaus	10 July 2006 (aged 16)	11	0	(Germany) 1899 Hoffenheim

=== Spain ===
Head coach: Kenio Gonzalo

The final 20-player squad was announced on 1 May 2023.

No.	Pos.	Player	Date of birth (age)	Club
1	GK	Alazne Estensoro	5 June 2006 (aged 16)	(Spain) Real Sociedad
2	DF	Martina González	9 December 2007 (aged 15)	(Spain) Barcelona
3	DF	Elena Vázquez	8 October 2007 (aged 15)	(Spain) Deportivo La Coruña
4	DF	Daniela Martínez	27 February 2007 (aged 16)	(Spain) Barcelona
5	DF	Amaya García	10 June 2007 (aged 15)	(Spain) Real Madrid
6	MF	Daniela Arques	21 March 2006 (aged 17)	(Spain) Alhama
7	FW	Noa Ortega	12 February 2007 (aged 16)	(Spain) Barcelona
8	MF	Ainhoa Alguacil	8 January 2006 (aged 17)	(Spain) Valencia
9	MF	Vicky López	26 July 2006 (aged 16)	(Spain) Barcelona
10	MF	Cristina Librán	11 January 2006 (aged 17)	(Spain) Madrid CFF
11	FW	Paula Comendador	12 January 2007 (aged 16)	(Spain) Real Madrid
12	DF	Aïcha Camara	11 December 2006 (aged 16)	(Spain) Barcelona
13	GK	Laia López	29 January 2007 (aged 16)	(Spain) Real Madrid
14	MF	Ainoa Gómez	13 April 2007 (aged 16)	(Spain) Barcelona
15	MF	Lorena Cubo	23 January 2007 (aged 16)	(Spain) Barcelona
16	FW	Marisa García	22 June 2006 (aged 16)	(Spain) Real Madrid
17	DF	Noemí Bejarano	27 June 2006 (aged 16)	(Spain) Real Betis
18	FW	Cristina Redondo	17 April 2006 (aged 17)	(Spain) Atlético Madrid
19	FW	Celia Segura	10 March 2007 (aged 16)	(Spain) Barcelona
20	FW	Alba Cerrato	1 January 2007 (aged 16)	(Spain) Sevilla

=== Switzerland ===
Head coach: Veronica Maglia

No.	Pos.	Player	Date of birth (age)	Club
1	GK	Yasmine Ammar	10 August 2006 (aged 16)	(Switzerland) BSC Young Boys
2	DF	Fiona Sperlich	8 October 2006 (aged 16)	(Switzerland) FC Luzern
3	DF	Chiara Wallin	18 June 2007 (aged 15)	(Switzerland) FC Meyrin
4	DF	Noemi Ivelj	1 November 2006 (aged 16)	(Switzerland) Grasshopper Club Zürich
5	DF	Emma Egli	21 July 2007 (aged 15)	(Switzerland) Grasshopper Club Zürich
6	MF	Lia Kamber	30 January 2006 (aged 17)	(Switzerland) FC Luzern
7	MF	Janina Egli	15 May 2006 (aged 16)	(Switzerland) Grasshopper Club Zürich
8	MF	Sydney Schertenleib	30 January 2007 (aged 16)	(Switzerland) FC Zürich
9	FW	Iman Beney	23 July 2006 (aged 16)	(Switzerland) BSC Young Boys
10	FW	Leela Egli	11 December 2006 (aged 16)	(Switzerland) FC Zürich
11	FW	Emanuela Pfister	12 April 2007 (aged 16)	(Switzerland) Grasshopper Club Zürich
12	GK	Tamara Biedermann	5 November 2006 (aged 16)	(Switzerland) BSC Young Boys
13	DF	Nathalie Widmer	16 April 2007 (aged 16)	(Switzerland) FC Zürich
14	DF	Mia Bennewitz	16 April 2006 (aged 17)	(Switzerland) FC St. Gallen 1879
15	DF	Lola Brügger	1 October 2006 (aged 16)	(Switzerland) FC Basel 1893
16	DF	Joana Dias	26 April 2006 (aged 17)	(Switzerland) FC Basel 1893
17	FW	Leila Wandeler	11 April 2006 (aged 17)	(Switzerland) FC Central FR
18	FW	Anja Klingenstein	28 January 2006 (aged 17)	(Switzerland) FC Aarau
19	MF	Nevia Stoob	3 July 2006 (aged 16)	(Switzerland) FC Rapperswil-Jona
20	FW	Anida Mujela	16 February 2007 (aged 16)	(Switzerland) FC Aarau

== Group B ==
=== England ===
Head coach: Mo Marley

The squad was announced on 11 May 2023.

No.	Pos.	Player	Date of birth (age)	Club
1	GK	Sophia Poor	25 June 2006 (aged 16)	(England) Leicester City
2	DF	Ria Bose	7 February 2006 (aged 17)	(England) Chelsea
3	DF	Mari Ward	3 January 2006 (aged 17)	(England) Bristol City
4	MF	Laila Harbert	3 January 2007 (aged 16)	(England) Arsenal
5	DF	Katie Reid	25 September 2006 (aged 16)	(England) Arsenal
6	DF	Zara Shaw	6 June 2007 (aged 15)	(England) Liverpool
7	FW	Araya Dennis	11 January 2006 (aged 17)	(England) Arsenal
8	MF	Lexi Potter	17 August 2006 (aged 16)	(England) Chelsea
9	FW	Michelle Agyemang	3 February 2006 (aged 17)	(England) Arsenal
10	MF	Lola Brown	31 October 2007 (aged 15)	(England) Chelsea
11	FW	Ava Baker	9 January 2006 (aged 17)	(England) Leicester City
12	FW	Milly Round	22 January 2006 (aged 17)	(England) Aston Villa
13	GK	Katie Cox	28 April 2006 (aged 17)	(England) Chelsea
14	MF	Holly Deering	1 February 2006 (aged 17)	(England) Manchester United
15	DF	Lucy Newell	2 October 2006 (aged 16)	(England) West Bromwich Albion
16	DF	Sophie Harwood	23 December 2007 (aged 15)	(England) Southampton
17	FW	Ruby-Rae Tucker	26 March 2006 (aged 17)	(England) Aston Villa
18	MF	Érica Parkinson	18 April 2008 (aged 15)	(Portugal) Leixões
19	MF	Vera Jones	18 February 2008 (aged 15)	(Wales) Barry Town
20	FW	Isabella Fisher	14 May 2007 (aged 16)	(England) Arsenal

=== France ===
Head coach: Peggy Provost

The final 20-player squad was announced on 2 May 2023.

No.	Pos.	Player	Date of birth (age)	Club
1	GK	Alyssa Fernandes	1 January 2006 (aged 17)	(France) Paris Saint-Germain
2	DF	Céleste Delcroix	30 April 2006 (aged 17)	(France) Lille
3	DF	Taeryne Job	10 July 2006 (aged 16)	(France) Saint-Étienne
4	DF	Marie Mulot	5 March 2006 (aged 17)	(France) Paris Saint-Germain
5	DF	Wassa Sangaré	16 March 2006 (aged 17)	(France) Lyon
6	DF	Lou Autin	25 January 2006 (aged 17)	(France) Bordeaux
7	FW	Naolia Traoré	22 January 2006 (aged 17)	(France) Paris Saint-Germain
8	FW	Mélinda Mendy	21 December 2006 (aged 16)	(France) Le Havre
9	FW	Liana Joseph	15 August 2006 (aged 16)	(France) Lyon
10	MF	Maeline Mendy	26 December 2006 (aged 16)	(France) Lyon
11	FW	Chancelle Effa Effa	14 September 2006 (aged 16)	(France) Le Havre
12	MF	Nermyne Ben Khaled	14 May 2006 (aged 17)	(France) Orléans
13	MF	Ornella Graziani	19 August 2007 (aged 15)	(France) Paris Saint-Germain
14	FW	Élisa Rambaud	24 July 2006 (aged 16)	(France) Montpellier
15	DF	Célia Delaby	20 December 2006 (aged 16)	(France) Lille
16	GK	Lou Marchal	3 January 2007 (aged 16)	(France) Ploërmel FC
17	MF	Kadidia Traoré	13 May 2006 (aged 17)	(France) Paris FC
18	MF	Julie Swierot	14 March 2006 (aged 17)	(France) Lyon
19	DF	Aude Bizet	14 March 2006 (aged 17)	(France) Fleury
20	MF	Landryna Lushimba Bilombi	14 March 2006 (aged 17)	(France) Paris Saint-Germain

=== Poland ===
Head coach: Marcin Kasprowicz

The final 20-player squad was announced on 24 April 2023.

No.	Pos.	Player	Date of birth (age)	Club
1	GK	Sandra Urbańczyk	25 April 2007 (aged 16)	(Poland) Górnik Łęczna
2	DF	Dominika Szkwarek	6 April 2006 (aged 17)	(Poland) Śląsk Wrocław
3	MF	Zuzanna Witek	19 September 2007 (aged 15)	(Poland) Czarni Sosnowiec
4	DF	Magda Piekarska	9 September 2007 (aged 15)	(Poland) Rekord Bielsko-Biała
5	DF	Iga Witkowska	27 March 2007 (aged 16)	(Poland) Rekord Bielsko-Biała
6	MF	Magdalena Półrolniczak	15 August 2006 (aged 16)	(Poland) Śląsk Wrocław
7	MF	Gabriela Lewicka	18 December 2006 (aged 16)	(Poland) Śląsk Wrocław
8	MF	Emilia Szymczak	17 June 2006 (aged 16)	(Poland) Górnik Łęczna
9	FW	Roksana Jagodzińska	21 November 2006 (aged 16)	(Poland) Warta Poznań
10	FW	Kinga Wyrwas	21 January 2007 (aged 16)	(Poland) KKP Bydgoszcz
11	MF	Paulina Guzik	13 June 2006 (aged 16)	(Poland) AZS UJ Kraków
12	GK	Julia Woźniak	15 April 2007 (aged 16)	(Poland) Medyk Konin
13	DF	Klaudia Kiełczewska	24 May 2006 (aged 16)	(Poland) UKS SMS Łódź
14	DF	Jagoda Cyraniak	23 May 2006 (aged 16)	(Poland) Górnik Łęczna
15	FW	Julia Gutowska	17 February 2006 (aged 17)	(Poland) Rekord Bielsko-Biała
16	FW	Zuzanna Grzywińska	23 June 2006 (aged 16)	(Poland) AP Orlen Gdańsk
17	MF	Zofia Dubiel	24 July 2007 (aged 15)	(Poland) Skra Częstochowa
18	MF	Wiktoria Kuprowska	15 May 2006 (aged 16)	(Netherlands) ADO Den Haag
19	MF	Weronika Araśniewicz	15 March 2008 (aged 15)	(Poland) Diamonds Academy
20	MF	Inez Sikora	23 March 2006 (aged 17)	(Poland) Górnik Łęczna

=== Sweden ===
Head coach: Lotta Hellenberg

The final 20-player squad was announced on 26 April 2023. The squad numbers were released on 13 May 2023.

No.	Pos.	Player	Date of birth (age)	Caps	Goals	Club
1	GK	Wilma Delerud	17 January 2006 (aged 17)	10	0	(Sweden) Eskilstuna United
2	DF	Annika Svensson	9 August 2006 (aged 16)	16	0	(Sweden) AIK
3	DF	Smilla Holmberg	11 October 2006 (aged 16)	14	1	(Sweden) Hammarby
4	DF	Maja Wangerheim	11 January 2006 (aged 17)	14	2	(Sweden) Kristianstad
5	DF	Emma Holmqvist	30 April 2006 (aged 17)	13	0	(Sweden) Husqvarna
6	DF	Bella Andersson	12 July 2006 (aged 16)	17	1	(Sweden) Hammarby
7	DF	Mikaela Stojanovska	28 November 2006 (aged 16)	16	0	(Sweden) Rosengård
8	MF	Alexandra Larsson	8 June 2006 (aged 16)	15	0	(Sweden) Häcken
9	MF	Elsa Pelgander	2 August 2006 (aged 16)	19	3	(Sweden) Örebro
10	FW	Nova Rolfsson	18 April 2007 (aged 16)	3	0	(Sweden) Halmstad
11	FW	Olivia Ländin Sjöblom	18 April 2006 (aged 17)	16	1	(Sweden) Djurgården
12	GK	Julia Cavander	10 December 2006 (aged 16)	7	0	(Sweden) Malmö
13	MF	Saga Fredgren	2 February 2006 (aged 17)	17	1	(Sweden) Rössö Uddevalla
14	MF	Ida Björnberg	31 December 2006 (aged 16)	17	1	(Sweden) Örebro
15	MF	Lykke Ihrfelt	31 March 2006 (aged 17)	9	0	(Sweden) Hammarby
16	DF	Vera Andersson	1 October 2006 (aged 16)	5	0	(Sweden) Kalmar
17	MF	Hannah Sjödahl	26 June 2006 (aged 16)	10	1	(Sweden) Vittsjö
18	MF	Novalie Jensen	18 March 2006 (aged 17)	13	1	(Sweden) Häcken
19	FW	Bianca Hultbäck Nattland	8 March 2006 (aged 17)	17	6	(Sweden) Jitex
20	FW	Felicia Schröder	13 April 2007 (aged 16)	7	2	(Sweden) Häcken
