= FC Barcelona C (women) =

FC Barcelona's women's reserve football team

Barcelona Femení "C"
- Full name: Futbol Club Barcelona Femení "C"
- Nicknames: Blaugranes, Culers
- Founded: 2022; 4 years ago
- Ground: Ciutat Esportiva Joan Gamper
- Capacity: 1,400
- President: Joan Laporta
- Head coach: Eric Sànchez
- League: Segunda Federación
- 2025–26: 1st (Tercera Federación)
- Website: Official website
Home colours	Away colours	Third colours

Futbol Club Barcelona Femení C is a Spanish football team based in Barcelona, in the autonomous community of Catalonia.

Founded in 2022, it is the second reserve team of FC Barcelona Femení, and currently plays in Segunda Federación, playing their home matches at the Ciutat Esportiva Joan Gamper.

Reserve teams in Spain play in the same league system as the main team, rather than in a separate league. They must play at least one level below their main side; Barcelona Femení C play in the third tier, behind the first and "B" teams in the first and second tiers. Barcelona Femení C achieved league promotion for the first four seasons of its existence, reaching the third tier and being unable to further progress.

== History ==
=== Current team ===
The Barcelona women's Juvenil-Cadet youth team were successful in their 2021–22 season, but with the B team still containing homegrown talent and signing more players from other clubs for the 2022–23 season, few of the youth players would be able to advance within Barcelona's structure. The club wanted to bridge the gap between the youth and senior teams, and expand the development programme. For the 2022–23 season, a third Barcelona women's team was registered. Four of the players registered had spent the 2021–22 season with one of Barcelona's girls' teams that came top of a boys' league, while three players were incorporated from the Tarragona-based F.F. Base Reus youth team that had won the girls' first division. As well as incorporating developing youth players, Viky Adrianova was also registered with the team, having played for the B team in the years prior. Magalí Capdevila played for the C and B teams, and was registered for the first team in the 2022–23 UEFA Women's Champions League.

Barcelona Femení C entered the Catalan league system, operated by the Catalan Football Federation (FCF), in the second division, where they competed in group 3 (subdivided by region). Though only in their first season and comprising young players, the team had an indomitable hold on the league, attracting much attention when their large goal differences were shared on social media. Despite this, none of the team finished the season as the league's top goalscorer. They mathematically won the league in April 2023, and were given a winner's reception at a sold-out Estadi Johan Cruyff on 30 April ahead of the first team match that saw them win the Liga F.

They were promoted to the FCF first division for their second season, competing in group 2 (subdivided by region). Both Adrianova and Magalí Capdevila received student grants to play college soccer in the United States in 2023, leaving ahead of the new season. In the absence of first team players who were at the 2023 FIFA Women's World Cup, much of the main C squad trained with the first and B teams during the 2023–24 preseason.

In May 2024 the team won their league, again with a perfect record, to achieve back-to-back promotions; in the top-level Catalan league, Barcelona C defeated Cerdanyola del Vallès 30–0 in one of football's largest scorelines. The team entered the national league system after again winning the league and promotion in 2025, joining group 5 of Tercera Federación. They won this league in 2026, then defeated Gijón FF 4–2 across two legs of the first promotion playoff to gain promotion to the national third tier (unable to further progress). Barcelona C's Weronika Araśniewicz, who had spent the 2025–26 season on loan at VfL Wolfsburg's second team, became the first known women's player outside of the top two leagues to command a transfer fee when Wolfsburg triggered the purchase option and promoted her to its first team in July 2026.

=== Predecessors ===
Prior to the 2006 restructure there was a Barcelona women's C team in senior competition, and it survived this overhaul. In the 2007–08 season, the team was part of the second division of regional football.

== Current squad ==
As of April 2026

Players marked with * also train or play with the B team. Note: Flags indicate national team as defined under FIFA eligibility rules; some limited exceptions apply. Players may hold more than one non-FIFA nationality.

No.	Pos.	Nation	Player
1	GK	ESP	Clara Raspall *
2	DF	ESP	Cristina López R.
3	DF	ESP	Carlota Martins
4	DF	ESP	Maria Torres
5	DF	ESP	Abril Rius S. *
6	MF	ESP	Mariona Señé
7	FW	ESP	Laia Guerrero
8	FW	ESP	Beatriz Pérez *
9	FW	ESP	Martina Romero
10	MF	ESP	Montse Alabart
11	MF	ESP	Ivet Franch
12	MF	ESP	Avril Serrano

No.	Pos.	Nation	Player
13	GK	ESP	Ariadna Ayats
14	MF	ESP	Laia Cabetas *
16	MF	USA	Siena Giselle Groo
17	DF	ESP	Nayara Nuñez
18	FW	ESP	Maria Rius V.
20	DF	ESP	Júlia Pastor
21	DF	ESP	Daniela Lopez G.
23	DF	ESP	Arlet Aguayo *
25	GK	ESP	Nuria Gonzalez
26	DF	ESP	Charlotta Ohlander (Note: Ohlander has played for Sweden but most recently Spain at youth level.) *
27	FW	ESP	Lidia Gibert
28	FW	SEN	Aissatou Traoré

=== Current technical staff ===
Position	Staff
Head coach	Eric Sànchez
Assistant coach	Marc Sayago
Goalkeeping coach	Carles Boch
Fitness coach	Jordi Dot & Marta Prieto

Last updated: 26 April 2026
Source: FC Barcelona

=== Transfers ===
For all current and former players with Wikipedia articles, see Category:FC Barcelona Femení C players

Summer	In	Out
2022	GK: Mar Pérez (promoted from the youth team), C. Garcia-Donas (Cornellà youth team); DF: A. Román, M. Calderón, E. Torbado, E. Garrigós, C. López (promoted from the youth team); MF: C. Casajuana, J. Sánchez, G. Blanco (promoted from the youth team), M. Torres (CE Europa youth team), N. Pon (Damm), M. Martín (Espanyol), I. Grao, M. Alabart (FF Base Reus youth team); FW: M. Capdevila, M. Henley, Andrea Cano (promoted from the youth team), V. Adrianova (Barcelona B), C. J. Garriga (FF Base Reus youth team)	
2023	GK: C. Raspall (promoted from the youth team), L. Oller (Sabadell); MF: R. Capdevila, M. Llorella, E. Gálvez, G. Cabello, P. Domínguez, C. Cortés, V. Fernández (promoted from the youth team); FW: Cèlia, M. Fernández, L. Suárez (promoted from the youth team), C. Gómez Martínez (Damm), D. Yazbeck Morell (Espanyol)	GK: Mar Pérez (CD Juan Grande), C. Garcia-Donas; DF: M. Calderón, E. Torbado, E. Garrigós, C. López; MF: N. Doña; FW: M. Capdevila (Penn Quakers), Andrea Cano (Espanyol), V. Adrianova (Jacksonville State Gamecocks), M. Henley (Florida Gulf Coast Eagles), C. J. Garriga
2024	GK: R. Romano (promoted from the youth team); DF: I. Lobo (Sporting), N. Jiménez (promoted from the youth team); MF: Rosalía (Sevilla), W. Araśniewicz (Warsaw Diamonds), C. Martins, L. Martín (promoted from the youth team); FW: Lúa (Victoria CF), B. Pérez, D. Martínez, K. Azraf, N. Ortega, L. Guerrero, N. Sandoval, M. Romero, È. Garrigós, A. Quer (promoted from the youth team)	GK: C. Raspall (promoted to Barcelona B), Emmeline Andersen; DF: Aina Román, Chloë Arrufat Wood, Lozen Ricard; MF: R. Capdevila (Zaragoza CFF), M. Llorella (promoted to Barcelona B/reserves), Núria Pon, Meritxell Martín, Júlia Sánchez, Izarbe Grau, Gisela Cabello, Paula Domínguez, Carla Cortés, Valentina Fernández, Abril Rius; FW: C. Segura (promoted to Barcelona B/reserves), Marta Fernández, Claudia Gómez Martínez
2025	GK: C. O'Dea (Espanyol), N. Gonzalez (promoted from the youth team); DF: J. Pastor (Marcet Football Academy), D. Lopez (CD Salamanca FF), A. Aguayo (OAR Vic), Charlotta Ohlander (promoted from the youth team); MF: S. Groo (Real Colorado)	GK: R. Romano (promoted to Barcelona B/reserves); DF: N. Jimenez, I. Lobo (promoted to Barcelona B); MF: W. Araśniewicz (on loan at VfL Wolfsburg), L. Martín (on loan at Villarreal), R. Domínguez, L. Cubo, A. Gómez (promoted to Barcelona B/reserves), E. Gálvez (promoted to Barcelona B); FW: L. Arufe, D. Yazbeck Morell, D. Martínez, K. Azraf, N. Ortega, È. Garrigós, A. Quer (promoted to Barcelona B)

== Season to season ==
Season	Division	Tier	Pos	Pld	W	D	L	GF	GA	GD	Pts	Manager	Top scorer
2022–23 (Note: The game corresponding to Barcelona C's final matchday of 2022–23 (7 May 2023) was abandoned by the other team, whom Barcelona C had defeated 24–0 earlier in the season; a 3–0 win was awarded to Barcelona C. The goals are counted in the season total.)	2ª Catalana	7	1.º	26	26	0	0	310	0	+310	78	Iván Molpeceres	Nuria Pon (40)
2023–24	1ª Catalana	6	1.º	30	30	0	0	230	14	+216	90	Iván Molpeceres	Dana Yazbeck Morell (49)
2024–25	Preferente Catalana	5	1.º	30	29	1	0	187	11	+176	88	Iván Molpeceres	Kautar Azraf (42)
2025–26	Tercera Federación	4	1.º	22	16	2	4	62	17	+45	50	Iván Molpeceres /Eric Sànchez (Note: Sànchez, as assistant coach, had taken charge of some games early in the season prior to Molpeceres formally leaving the team in November 2025 following a run of two draws and a loss.)	Siena Giselle Groo & Maria Rius (10)
2026–27	Segunda Federación	3										Eric Sànchez	
Last update 20 June 2026

== Juvenil Cadete squad ==
FC Barcelona Femení has several youth squads; the Femení Juvenil Cadete squad also compete in the Catalan leagues, as of 2023 in group 1 of the top youth division. Several of the Juvenil players are also registered with and have played for the senior teams.

As of June 2026

Players who were called up for the C team during the most recent season. Note: Flags indicate national team as defined under FIFA eligibility rules; some limited exceptions apply. Players may hold more than one non-FIFA nationality.

No.	Pos.	Nation	Player
33	GK	USA	Carmen O'Dea
—	DF	ESP	Georgina Morante
—	MF	ESP	Jana Muro
—	MF	ESP	Elena Vizuete

No.	Pos.	Nation	Player
—	MF	ESP	Noa Benito
—	FW	ESP	Bruna Quintana
—	FW	MAR	Mayssa Baha
