= Lúa Arufe =

Spanish footballer (born 2007)

Personal information
- Full name: Lúa Arufe Calo
- Date of birth: 6 September 2008 (age 18)
- Place of birth: Porto do Son, Spain
- Position: Forward

Team information
- Current team: FC Barcelona B
- Number: 18

Youth career
- 2020–2021: Noia CF Femenino
- 2021–2023: Victoria CF B Femenino

Senior career*
Years	Team	Apps	(Gls)
2023–2024	Victoria CF Femenino		
2024–2025	FC Barcelona C		
2025–	FC Barcelona B	28	(1)

International career
2024–	Spain U17		
Medal record
Women's football
Representing Spain
UEFA Women's Under-19 Championship
Winner	2026 Bosnia and Herzegovina
UEFA Women's Under-17 Championship
Winner	2024 Sweden
- * Club domestic league appearances and goals as of 11:29, 17 May 2026 (UTC)

Lúa Arufe Calo (born 6 September 2008) is a Spanish footballer who plays as a forward for FC Barcelona B.

== Club career ==
=== Noia CF Femenino ===
She joined Noia CF Femenino in the 2020–21 season.

=== Victoria CF Femenino ===
She joined Victoria CF B Femenino in 2021 until 2023 and played in the first team until 2024.

=== FC Barcelona C ===
She joined FC Barcelona C along with Rosalía Domínguez, Weronika Araśniewicz, and Iara Lobo in 2024.

== International career ==
=== Spain U17 ===
She was called up for the 2024 UEFA Under-17 Championship, won by Spain, where she scored three goals.

She was called up for the 2025 UEFA Under-17 Championship.

== Honours ==
Barcelona

- UEFA Women's Champions League: 2025–26

Spain U17

- UEFA Women's Under-17 Championship: 2024

Spain U19

- UEFA Women's Under-19 Championship: 2026
