= Marie Preus =

Norwegian footballer (born 2008)

Personal information
- Full name: Marie Moen Preus
- Date of birth: 27 August 2008 (age 18)
- Place of birth: Norway
- Position: Forward

Team information
- Current team: Vålerenga
- Number: 20

Youth career
- 2020–2023: KFUM
- 2023: Kolbotn

Senior career*
Years	Team	Apps	(Gls)
2023	Kolbotn 2	9	(13)
2023–2024	Kolbotn	41	(17)
2025–	Vålerenga	13	(3)

International career^{‡}
2022	Norway U14	2	(1)
2023	Norway U15	2	(2)
2024	Norway U16	10	(7)
2025–	Norway U17	8	(7)
2025–	Norway U18	1	(1)
Medal record
Women's football
Representing Norway
UEFA Women's Under-17 Championship
Runner-up	2025 Faroe Islands
- * Club domestic league appearances and goals as of 16 August 2025 ‡ National team caps and goals as of 25 June 2025

Marie Moen Preus (born 27 August 2008) is a Norwegian professional footballer who plays as a forward for Toppserien club Vålerenga.

== Club career ==
=== Kolbotn (2023–2024) ===
After playing age-appropriate football at KFUM Oslo, Preus signed for Kolbotn in April 2023. She made her debut in the 1. divisjon for Kolbotn at the age of 14 in April 2023. In her first season for the club, she played 17 league matches and scored seven goals in a season Kolbotn was promoted to the Toppserien.

In her first season in the Toppserien in 2024, she scored 10 goals in 24 matches and became Kolbotn's top scorer in the league. At the age of 16, she was nominated for "breakthrough of the year" and selected for the "team of the year" in the 2024 season by TV 2.

=== Vålerenga (2025–) ===
On 3 January 2025, Preus signed a three-year contract with reigning league and cup champions Vålerenga.

== International career ==
Preus was called up to the U17 squad for the UEFA Women's Under-17 Championship on 16 April 2025.

== Honours ==
Norway U17

- UEFA Women's Under-17 Championship runner-up: 2025

Individual

- UEFA Women's Under-17 Championship top scorer: 2025
- UEFA Women's Under-17 Championship Team of the Tournament: 2025
