= 2025 UEFA Women's Under-17 Championship =

2025 kvinnur U-17 dmeistaraheitið fótbólt UEFA U17-mesterskab for kvinder i 2025

Tournament details
- Host country: Faroe Islands
- Dates: 4–17 May
- Teams: 8 (from 1 confederation)
- Venues: 2 (in 2 host cities)

Final positions
- Champions: Netherlands (1st title)
- Runners-up: Norway

Tournament statistics
- Matches played: 16
- Goals scored: 73 (4.56 per match)
- Attendance: 5,923 (370 per match)
- Top scorer: (Norway) Marie Preus (5 goals)
- Best player: (Netherlands) Ranneke Derks

The 2025 UEFA Women's Under-17 Championship was the 16th edition of the UEFA Women's Under-17 Championship, the annual international youth football championship organised by UEFA for the women's under-17 national teams of Europe. Faroe Islands hosted the tournament. A total of eight teams played in the tournament, with players born on or after 1 January 2008 eligible to participate.

In the 2024 final, Spain won their fifth title by defeating England 4–0.

This tournament acted as a qualifier for the 2025 FIFA U-17 Women's World Cup in Morocco from 17 October to 8 November. UEFA's five berths were taken by the four WU17 Euro semi-finalists and the winner of a play-off between the two teams finishing third in their groups.

== Qualification ==
50 (out of 55) UEFA nations entered the qualifying competition, with the hosts Faroe Islands also competing despite already qualifying automatically, and seven teams qualified for the final tournament at the end of round 2 to join the hosts.

Team	Method of qualification	Appearance	Last appearance	Previous best performance
Faroe Islands	Hosts	1st	Debut	
France	Round 2 Group A2 winners	11th	2024 (Fourth place)	Champions (2023)
Spain	Round 2 Group A1 winners	14th	2024 (Champions)	Champions (2010, 2011, 2015, 2018, 2024)
Italy	Round 2 Group A3 winners	4th	2018 (Group stage)	Third place (2014)
Poland	Round 2 Group A4 winners	5th	2024 (Third place)	Champions (2013)
Netherlands	Round 2 Group A5 winners	6th	2022 (Fourth place)	Runners-up (2019)
Norway	Round 2 Group A6 winners	7th	2024 (Group stage)	Fourth place (2009, 2016), Semi-finals (2017)
Austria	Round 2 Group A7 winners	3rd	2019 (Group stage)	Group stage (2014, 2019)

== Venues ==
2025 UEFA Women's Under-17 Championship is located in Denmark Faroe Islands	Klaksvík	Tórshavn
2025 UEFA Women's Under-17 Championship is located in Denmark Faroe Islands	Við Djúpumýru (Klaksvík Stadium)	Tórsvøllur
2025 UEFA Women's Under-17 Championship is located in Denmark Faroe Islands	Capacity: 2500	Capacity: 6500

== Squads ==
Each national team had to submit a squad of 20 players, two of whom had to be goalkeepers.

== Group stage ==
The draw for the group stage was held on 26 March 2025 at 12:00 at the Philharmonic Hall in Varpið, Klaksvík. The group winners and runners-up advanced to the semi-finals and automatically qualified for the 2025 FIFA U-17 Women's World Cup. The third-placed teams in both groups qualified for the play-off match, with the winner also qualifying for the 2025 FIFA U-17 Women's World Cup.

Tie-breaking criteria for group play
The ranking of teams in the group stage was determined as follows:
1. Points obtained in all group matches;
2. Points in head-to-head matches among tied teams;
3. Goal difference in head-to-head matches among tied teams;
4. Goals scored in head-to-head matches among tied teams;
5. If more than two teams were tied, and after applying all head-to-head criteria above, a subset of teams were still tied, all head-to-head criteria above were reapplied exclusively to this subset of teams;
6. Goal difference in all group matches;
7. Goals scored in all group matches;
8. Penalty shoot-out if only two teams had the same number of points, and they met in the last round of the group and were tied after applying all criteria above (not used if more than two teams had the same number of points, or if their rankings were not relevant for qualification for the next stage);
9. Disciplinary points
  - Yellow card: −1 point;
  - Indirect red card (second yellow card): −3 points;
  - Direct red card: −3 points;
10. UEFA coefficient for the qualifying round draw;
11. Drawing of lots.

=== Group A ===
Pos	Team	Pld	W	D	L	GF	GA	GD	Pts	Qualification
1	Netherlands	3	3	0	0	15	1	+14	9	Knockout stage and qualification for 2025 FIFA U-17 Women's World Cup
2	Norway	3	1	1	1	10	2	+8	4	Knockout stage and qualification for 2025 FIFA U-17 Women's World Cup
3	Austria	3	1	1	1	10	4	+6	4	Play-off match for the 2025 FIFA U-17 Women's World Cup
4	Faroe Islands (H)	3	0	0	3	0	28	−28	0	

Source: UEFA
Rules for classification: Group stage tiebreakers
(H) Hosts
4 May 2025
15:00

Austria	1–4	Netherlands
Grabovac 30'	Report	Derks 7', 90'; Dap 14'; Grabovac 23' (o.g.)

Klaksvík Stadium, Klaksvík
Attendance: 136
Referee: Kirsty Dowle (England)
4 May 2025
18:00

Faroe Islands	0–10	Norway
	Report	Preus 1', 12', 35'; Herseth 6', 20'; Senior-Hårvik 13', 30'; Hoem 43'; Halbmayr 55', 65'

Tórsvøllur, Tórshavn
Attendance: 874
Referee: Vanja Janković (Slovenia)

7 May 2025
15:00

Faroe Islands	0–9	Austria
	Report	Lueger 6', 19'; Rauscha 12', 42', 69'; Grabovac 45+1'; Tuppinger 52'; Szuchy 86'; Richter 90+1'

Klaksvík Stadium, Klaksvík
Attendance: 731
Referee: Nanna Løf Andersen (Denmark)
7 May 2025
18:00

Netherlands	2–0	Norway
Eloualidi 75'; Derks 88'	Report

Tórsvøllur, Tórshavn
Attendance: 176
Referee: Laura Mauricio (Switzerland)

10 May 2025
15:00

Netherlands	9–0	Faroe Islands
Horváth 13', 65'; El Belati 18', 71'; Djurhuus 28' (o.g.); Vinckers 45+2'; Renfurm 63', 76'; Touzani 78'	Report

Tórsvøllur, Tórshavn
Attendance: 505
Referee: Jelena Kumer (Croatia)
10 May 2025
15:00

Norway	0–0	Austria
	Report

Klaksvík Stadium, Klaksvík
Attendance: 60
Referee: Vanja Janković (Slovenia)

=== Group B ===
Pos	Team	Pld	W	D	L	GF	GA	GD	Pts	Qualification
1	Italy	3	2	1	0	7	5	+2	7	Knockout stage and qualification for 2025 FIFA U-17 Women's World Cup
2	France	3	1	2	0	5	3	+2	5	Knockout stage and qualification for 2025 FIFA U-17 Women's World Cup
3	Spain	3	1	1	1	5	4	+1	4	Play-off match for the 2025 FIFA U-17 Women's World Cup
4	Poland	3	0	0	3	5	10	−5	0	

Source: UEFA
Rules for classification: Group stage tiebreakers
5 May 2025
15:00

Spain	1–1	France
Cristóbal 12'	Report	Adedini 24'

Klaksvík Stadium, Klaksvík
Attendance: 153
Referee: Franziska Wildfeuer (Germany)
5 May 2025
18:00

Poland	3–4	Italy
Świrska 47'; Klimczak 83'; Burzan 88'	Report	Romanelli 5'; Ostopinka 34' (o.g.); Giudici 42'; Galli 84'

Tórsvøllur, Tórshavn
Attendance: 200
Referee: Jana Van Laere (Belgium)

8 May 2025
15:00

Italy	1–1	France
Bedini 14'	Report	Adedini 39'

Tórsvøllur, Tórshavn
Attendance: 212
Referee: Jelena Kumer (Croatia)
8 May 2025
18:00

Spain	3–1	Poland
Quer 41'; Arufe 71'; Domínguez 76'	Report	Carvajal 74' (o.g.)

Klaksvík Stadium, Klaksvík
Attendance: 65
Referee: Milica Milovanović (Serbia)

11 May 2025
15:00

Italy	2–1	Spain
Galli 38', 71'	Report	Cristóbal 90+2'

Tórsvøllur, Tórshavn
Attendance: 255
Referee: Jana Van Laere (Belgium)
11 May 2025
15:00

France	3–1	Poland
Kharafi 19'; Bardet 32'; Lemańczyk 88' (o.g.)	Report	Świrska 51'

Klaksvík Stadium, Klaksvík
Attendance: 98
Referee: Nanna Løf Andersen (Denmark)

== Play-off match ==
The winner qualified for the 2025 FIFA U-17 Women's World Cup.

14 May 2025
12:00

Austria	1–6	Spain
Richter 30'	Report	Quer 23'; Carvajal 29'; Domínguez 52'; Gómez 59' (pen.); Arufe 64'; Jiménez 77'

Tórsvøllur, Tórshavn
Attendance: 408
Referee: Laura Mauricio (Switzerland)

== Knockout stage ==
In the knockout stage, a penalty shoot-out was used to decide the winner if necessary (no extra time was played).

=== Bracket ===
Semi-finals
14 May
Netherlands (p)	1 (4)
France	1 (3)
14 May
Italy	1
Norway	3

Final
17 May
Netherlands	2
Norway	1

=== Semi-finals ===
14 May 2025
15:00

Netherlands	1–1	France
Pennock 5'	Report	Ruffien 83'
Penalties
Renfurm (penalty scored); Derks (penalty missed); Thomassen (penalty scored); Vinckers (penalty scored); Touzani (penalty scored)	4–3	(penalty missed) Grondin; (penalty scored) Laboucarie; (penalty scored) Ramdane; (penalty scored) Moreau-Tranchant; (penalty missed) Fathallah

Klaksvík Stadium, Klaksvík
Attendance: 174
Referee: Franziska Wildfeuer (Germany)
14 May 2025
18:00

Italy	1–3	Norway
Giudici 49'	Report	Herseth 28'; Randazzo 41' (o.g.); Preus 86'

Tórsvøllur, Tórshavn
Attendance: 286
Referee: Milica Milovanović (Serbia)

=== Final ===
17 May 2025
18:00

Netherlands	2–1	Norway
Van der Vliet 4'; Derks 42'	Report	Preus 56'

Tórsvøllur, Tórshavn
Attendance: 708
Referee: Kirsty Dowle (England)

== Qualified teams for FIFA U-17 Women's World Cup ==
The following five teams from UEFA qualified for the 2025 FIFA U-17 Women's World Cup in Morocco.

Team	Qualified on	Previous appearances in FIFA U-17 Women's World Cup^{1}
Netherlands	7 May 2025	0 (debut)
Norway	10 May 2025	0 (debut)
France	11 May 2025	3 (2008, **2012**, 2022)
Italy	11 May 2025	1 (2014)
Spain	14 May 2025	6 (2010, 2014, 2016, **2018**, **2022**, 2024)

^{1} Bold indicates champions for that year.

== Goalscorers ==
There were 73 goals scored in 16 matches, for an average of 4.56 goals per match.

5 goals

- (Norway) Marie Preus

4 goals

- (Netherlands) Ranneke Derks

3 goals

- (Austria) Ella Rauscha
- (Italy) Giulia Galli
- (Norway) Christina Herseth

2 goals

- (Austria) Sara Grabovac
- (Austria) Denise Lueger
- (Austria) Katie Richter
- (France) Rachael Adedini
- (Italy) Rachele Giudici
- (Netherlands) Otylia El Belati
- (Netherlands) Kiki Horváth
- (Netherlands) Rosalie Renfurm
- (Norway) Heidi Halbmayr
- (Norway) Serah Senior-Hårvik
- (Poland) Lena Świrska
- (Spain) Lúa Arufe
- (Spain) Silvi Cristóbal
- (Spain) Rosalía Domínguez
- (Spain) Anna Quer

1 goal

- (Austria) Alba Szuchy
- (Austria) Dayna Tuppinger
- (France) Ludivine Bardet
- (France) Bouchra Kharafi
- (France) Lou Ruffien
- (Italy) Benedetta Bedini
- (Italy) Martina Romanelli
- (Netherlands) Rochelity Dap
- (Netherlands) Ayah Eloualidi
- (Netherlands) Liv Pennock
- (Netherlands) Lina Touzani
- (Netherlands) Jayda Vinckers
- (Netherlands) Tess van der Vliet
- (Norway) Mie Hoem
- (Poland) Zofia Burzan
- (Poland) Kinga Klimczak
- (Spain) María Carvajal
- (Spain) Celia Gómez
- (Spain) Noa Jiménez

1 own goal

- (Austria) Sara Grabovac (against the Netherlands)
- (Faroe Islands) Leona Djurhuus (against the Netherlands)
- (Italy) Randazzo (against Norway)
- (Poland) Dominika Lemańczyk (against France)
- (Poland) Maria Ostopinka (against Italy)
- (Spain) María Carvajal (against Poland)

== Awards ==
The following awards were given after the tournament:

- Player of the Tournament: (Netherlands) Ranneke Derks
- Top Scorer(s): (Norway) Marie Preus (5 goals)

=== Team of the Tournament ===
After the tournament, the Under-17 Team of the Tournament was selected by the UEFA Technical Observer panel.

Position	Player
Goalkeeper	(Netherlands) Maren Groothoff
Defenders	(Italy) Caterina Venturelli
Defenders	(Spain) Silvia Cristóbal
Defenders	(Norway) Mille Flø
Defenders	(Netherlands) Kim Rietveld
Midfielders	(Netherlands) Rosalie Renfurm
Midfielders	(Italy) Rachele Giudici
Midfielders	(France) Tanté Diakité
Forwards	(Netherlands) Liv Pennock
Forwards	(Norway) Marie Preus
Forwards	(Netherlands) Ranneke Derks
