= Iara Lobo =

Portuguese footballer (born 2008)

Personal information
- Full name: Iara Soares Martins Baptista Lobo
- Date of birth: 26 January 2008 (age 18)
- Place of birth: Faro, Portugal
- Height: 1.68 m (5 ft 6 in)
- Position: Right-back

Team information
- Current team: Parma (on loan from Barcelona B)

Youth career
- 2014–2019: Ferreiras
- 2019–2022: Sporting CP
- 2024–2025: Barcelona C

Senior career*
Years	Team	Apps	(Gls)
2022–2024	Sporting CP B	33	(1)
2025–	Barcelona B	19	(0)
2026–	→ Parma (loan)	0	(0)

International career^{‡}
2022–2023	Portugal U15	3	(0)
2023–2024	Portugal U17	25	(0)
2024–	Portugal U19	31	(0)
- * Club domestic league appearances and goals as of 14:17, 10 August 2026 (UTC) ‡ National team caps and goals as of 09:24, 4 September 2026 (UTC)

Iara Soares Martins Baptista Lobo (born 16 January 2008) is a Portuguese professional footballer who plays as a right-back for Serie A club Parma, on loan from Primera Federación club FC Barcelona B.

== Club career ==
=== Ferreiras ===
She joined F.C. Ferreiras in 2014 for the U-7s, passing through Prebenjamines U-9s in 2015 and Escolar U-11 in 2017.

=== Sporting CP ===
Lobo joined Sporting CP in 2019.

=== FC Barcelona C ===
Lobo joined Barcelona C in 2024. She was presented alongside Rosalía Domínguez, Lúa Arufe and Weronika Araśniewicz.

== International career ==
=== Portugal U15 ===
Lobo made her debut for Portugal under-15 team in a 1–1 draw with Belgium on 3 March 2022.

=== Portugal U17 ===
She earned her first cap for Portugal U17 in the 2023 UEFA Women's Under-17 Championship qualifiers in 2023 against Hungary.

She was called up for the 2024 UEFA Women's Under-17 Championship.

=== Portugal U19 ===
She made her first appearance for the Portugal U19s in 2024. She played in 2025 UEFA Women's Under-19 Championship qualifiers. At the 2025 UEFA Women's Under-19 Championship, she scored an own goal against England.
