= Ranneke Derks =

Dutch footballer (born 2008)

Personal information
- Full name: Ranneke Johanna Elisabeth Derks
- Date of birth: 29 April 2008 (age 18)
- Place of birth: Oss, Netherlands
- Position: Striker

Team information
- Current team: Ajax
- Number: 7

Youth career
- –2023: UDI '19
- 2023–2024: PSV

Senior career*
Years	Team	Apps	(Gls)
2024–2025	PSV	9	(1)
2025–	Ajax	16	(8)

International career^{‡}
2023	Netherlands U15	4	(1)
2023–2024	Netherlands U16	4	(5)
2023–2025	Netherlands U17	24	(8)
2026–	Netherlands U19	6	(0)
Medal record
Women's football
Representing Netherlands
FIFA U-17 Women's World Cup
Runner-up	2025 Morocco
UEFA Women's Under-17 Championship
Winner	2025 Faroe Islands
- * Club domestic league appearances and goals as of 22 May 2026 ‡ National team caps and goals as of 17 April 2026

Ranneke Johanna Elisabeth Derks (born 29 April 2008) is a Dutch professional footballer who plays as a striker for Eredivisie Vrouwen club Ajax.

== Club career ==
=== PSV Eindhoven ===
Derks played for UDI '19 from Uden in her youth. In 2023, she transferred to the PSV youth academy.

At the end of 2023, Derks was included in a list of the greatest talents in the Netherlands by the NOS. On 11 May 2024, she made her debut for PSV in the Eredivisie Vrouwen in a home match against Excelsior. Derks was allowed to substitute for Laura Strik in the 79th minute. Derks provided the assist for an own goal by Veerle van Spijk in the 93rd minute, which allowed PSV to win the match.

By the 2024–25 season, Derks gained a permanent place in the selection of the Eindhoven team. On 18 January 2025, she scored her first goal in the Women's Eredivisie in a home game against Excelsior by determining the final score at 4–0 on an assist from Fleur Stoit.

=== Ajax ===
After the 2024–25 season, Derks transferred to Ajax, where she signed a contract until mid-2028. She made the switch due to a lack of opportunities for young talent at PSV, which mainly opts for experienced players.

== International career ==
Derks made her debut for the Dutch U15 team on 11 May 2023 in an away match against Belgium. She also made her debut for the Netherlands under 16 in 2023 and with this youth selection she played at the Nordic Tournament a year later. In the same year she also made her debut for the Netherlands U17, for which she played in the qualifying series for the UEFA Women's Under-17 Championship in the Faroe Islands in 2025. Derks was part of the Netherlands U17 team that became European champions for the first time at this final tournament. Thanks to a goal by Derks in the final, they managed to beat Norway 2–1. She was also named "player of the tournament".

Derks also played with the Dutch team for the FIFA U-17 Women's World Cup, where her team lost to North Korea in the final.

== Honours ==
Netherlands U17

- FIFA U-17 Women's World Cup runner-up: 2025
- UEFA Women's Under-17 Championship: 2025

Individual

- UEFA Women's Under-17 Championship Player of the Tournament: 2025
- UEFA Women's Under-17 Championship Team of the Tournament: 2025
