= 2026 UEFA Women's Under-17 Championship squads =

Player listing of women's football competition

The following is a list of squads for each national team competing at the 2026 UEFA Women's Under-17 Championship in Northern Ireland. Each national team had to submit a squad of 20 players born on or after 1 January 2009.

== Group A ==
=== Northern Ireland ===
Head coach: Gail Redmond

The squad was announced on 29 April 2026.

No.	Pos.	Player	Date of birth (age)	Club
1	GK	Sophie Glover	15 May 2009 (aged 16)	(Irish Football Association) Crusaders Strikers
12	GK	Ifeoma Agoha	21 September 2011 (aged 14)	(Irish Football Association) Derry City
2	DF	Daisy Moore	1 May 2009 (aged 17)	(Irish Football Association) Crusaders Strikers
3	DF	Holly Hilton	30 November 2009 (aged 16)	(Irish Football Association) Lisburn Rangers
5	DF	Chloe Beckinsale	19 October 2009 (aged 16)	(Irish Football Association) Crusaders Strikers
14	DF	Ellie McGarrigle	6 October 2009 (aged 16)	(Irish Football Association) Sion Swifts
15	DF	Zion Donnan	20 February 2011 (aged 15)	(Irish Football Association) Crusaders Strikers
19	DF	Sara Devany	26 April 2011 (aged 15)	(Irish Football Association) Glentoran
20	DF	Grace Steele	2 April 2010 (aged 16)	(Irish Football Association) Glentoran
4	MF	Mirjana Karrabecaj	30 April 2009 (aged 17)	(Irish Football Association) Linfield
6	MF	Heidi Curran	15 September 2009 (aged 16)	(Irish Football Association) Crusaders Strikers
7	MF	Emilee Leacock	27 February 2009 (aged 17)	(Irish Football Association) Crusaders Strikers
8	MF	Charlotte Havern	16 October 2009 (aged 16)	(Irish Football Association) Cliftonville
11	MF	Siún Kirby	26 March 2008 (aged 18)	(Football Association of Ireland) Dundalk
13	MF	Leah Hepburn	17 December 2011 (aged 14)	(Irish Football Association) Loughgall Lakers
9	FW	Maja Stachura	25 April 2009 (aged 17)	(Irish Football Association) Crusaders Strikers
10	FW	Abbie Smyth	16 April 2009 (aged 17)	(Irish Football Association) Lisburn Rangers
16	FW	Anna Rose Robinson	14 July 2010 (aged 15)	(Irish Football Association) Cliftonville
17	FW	Ava Hurl	1 February 2009 (aged 17)	(Irish Football Association) Crusaders Strikers
18	FW	Sydney Wilson	1 December 2009 (aged 16)	(Canadian Soccer Association) Pickering

=== England ===
Head coach: Kerri Welsh

The squad was announced on 29 April 2026.

No.	Pos.	Player	Date of birth (age)	Club
1	GK	Evie Mitchell	19 December 2009 (aged 16)	(The Football Association) Manchester United
13	GK	Victoria Rudz	10 September 2010 (aged 15)	(The Football Association) Chelsea
	GK	Billie Price (Note: Despite the squad limit of 20, England named 21 players in their squad with Billie Price being listed as a training player.)		(The Football Association) Brighton & Hove Albion
2	DF	Zoe Ciccardini	29 January 2010 (aged 16)	(The Football Association) Chelsea
3	DF	Katie Scott	24 September 2009 (aged 16)	(The Football Association) Aston Villa
5	DF	Lucy Robinson	1 April 2009 (aged 17)	(The Football Association) Manchester United
6	DF	Amarachukwu Nwankwo	22 July 2010 (aged 15)	(The Football Association) Manchester City
12	DF	Maisie Brickell	13 November 2009 (aged 16)	(The Football Association) Chelsea
15	DF	Isabella Cowley	20 August 2009 (aged 16)	(The Football Association) Arsenal
4	MF	Romia Gagliano	24 August 2009 (aged 16)	(Swiss Football Association) FC Basel
8	MF	Bryony Brodie	28 May 2009 (aged 16)	(The Football Association) Arsenal
10	MF	Kyri Teer-Hutchins	30 March 2009 (aged 17)	(The Football Association) Arsenal
11	MF	Mia Dixon	31 January 2010 (aged 16)	(The Football Association) Arsenal
14	MF	Gabriella Storey	26 November 2009 (aged 16)	(The Football Association) Chelsea
16	MF	Lottie Day	15 September 2009 (aged 16)	(The Football Association) Sheffield United
7	FW	Cairo Antoine	21 June 2009 (aged 16)	(The Football Association) Arsenal
9	FW	Freya Hirons	31 July 2009 (aged 16)	(The Football Association) Manchester City
17	FW	Sophia Burton	15 April 2009 (aged 17)	(The Football Association) Manchester City
18	FW	Phoebe De Bohan	19 May 2009 (aged 16)	(The Football Association) Arsenal
19	FW	Chelsea N’Drin	11 September 2009 (aged 16)	(The Football Association) Liverpool
20	FW	Abbie Jones	2 June 2009 (aged 16)	(The Football Association) Sheffield United

=== Germany ===
Head coach: Sabine Loderer

The squad was announced on 21 April 2026.

No.	Pos.	Player	Date of birth (age)	Club
1	GK	Mirja Kropp	8 July 2009 (aged 16)	(German Football Association) RB Leipzig
12	GK	Annika Dübel	16 May 2009 (aged 16)	(German Football Association) 1. FC Köln
2	DF	Eva Hell	18 November 2009 (aged 16)	(German Football Association) Eintracht Frankfurt
3	DF	Muriel Dürr	15 January 2009 (aged 17)	(German Football Association) VfB Stuttgart
4	DF	Laura Ernst	16 April 2009 (aged 17)	(German Football Association) SC Freiburg
13	DF	Valentina Lutz	10 May 2009 (aged 16)	(Austrian Football Association) Red Bull Salzburg
14	DF	Lynn Feiertag	21 July 2009 (aged 16)	(German Football Association) SC Freiburg
15	DF	Laura Dafinger	12 March 2009 (aged 17)	(German Football Association) Bayern Munich
18	DF	Laura Fühler	27 August 2009 (aged 16)	(German Football Association) Bayern Munich
6	MF	Fiona Itgenshorst	15 February 2009 (aged 17)	(German Football Association) Borussia Mönchengladbach
7	MF	Victoria Säring	30 May 2009 (aged 16)	(German Football Association) TSG 1899 Hoffenheim
8	MF	Johanna Hebben	26 May 2009 (aged 16)	(German Football Association) SC Freiburg
16	MF	Dana Keßler	30 January 2009 (aged 17)	(German Football Association) SV 67 Weinberg
17	MF	Marie Kleemann	12 September 2009 (aged 16)	(German Football Association) Eintracht Frankfurt
20	MF	Greta Hohensee	18 February 2009 (aged 17)	(German Football Association) FSV Gütersloh 2009
23	MF	Lena Joy Martens	18 February 2009 (aged 17)	(German Football Association) Hamburger SV
10	FW	Johanna Putzer	30 March 2009 (aged 17)	(German Football Association) SC Freiburg
11	FW	Mia Giesen	27 March 2009 (aged 17)	(German Football Association) Borussia Mönchengladbach
19	FW	Mia Kuhn	4 February 2009 (aged 17)	(German Football Association) SC Freiburg
22	FW	Clara Choisy	10 May 2009 (aged 16)	(German Football Association) Bayern Munich

=== Norway ===
Head coach: Elise Brotangen

The squad was announced on 13 April 2026.

No.	Pos.	Player	Date of birth (age)	Club
1	GK	Erla Braathen	1 March 2009 (aged 17)	(Norwegian Football Federation) Hønefoss BK
12	GK	Mille Viken	21 May 2009 (aged 16)	(Norwegian Football Federation) Stabæk
2	DF	Erle Ødegaard	27 August 2009 (aged 16)	(Norwegian Football Federation) Røa IL
3	DF	Vilde Riis Vinje	22 March 2009 (aged 17)	(Norwegian Football Federation) Odds BK
4	DF	Isa Lund	14 September 2009 (aged 16)	(Norwegian Football Federation) SK Brann
5	DF	Selma Igesund Saga	6 July 2009 (aged 16)	(Italian Football Federation) Como
13	DF	Agnes Stølan	19 March 2009 (aged 17)	(Norwegian Football Federation) Stabæk
18	DF	Lina Mørch	6 February 2009 (aged 17)	(Norwegian Football Federation) Øvrevoll Hosle IL
6	MF	Isabella Lepore	26 February 2009 (aged 17)	(Norwegian Football Federation) Lillestrøm SK
7	MF	Jenny Storsletten	26 January 2009 (aged 17)	(Norwegian Football Federation) FK Bodø/Glimt
8	MF	Stine Ariell Solemdal	18 March 2010 (aged 16)	(Norwegian Football Federation) Medkila IL
14	MF	Davis Lundhaug	10 November 2009 (aged 16)	(Norwegian Football Federation) Viking FK
15	MF	Sofia Norebø	1 December 2009 (aged 16)	(Norwegian Football Federation) Lillestrøm SK
16	MF	Elisha Berisha	22 January 2009 (aged 17)	(Norwegian Football Federation) Røa IL
9	FW	Hanne Nesse	22 June 2009 (aged 16)	(Norwegian Football Federation) Bryne FK
10	FW	Mie Hoem	9 August 2009 (aged 16)	(Norwegian Football Federation) Stabæk
11	FW	Maia Melgård	21 March 2009 (aged 17)	(Norwegian Football Federation) Lyn Fotball
17	FW	Live Balmforth	16 April 2010 (aged 16)	(Norwegian Football Federation) Viking FK
19	FW	Johanna Fedeler	2 August 2009 (aged 16)	(Norwegian Football Federation) IK Start
20	FW	Emile Strand Blindheim	21 October 2009 (aged 16)	(Norwegian Football Federation) Aalesunds FK

== Group B ==
=== Finland ===
Head coach: Akan Okomoh

The squad was announced on 20 April 2026.

No.	Pos.	Player	Date of birth (age)	Club
1	GK	Ronja Leppämäki	4 January 2009 (aged 17)	(Football Association of Finland) HJK
12	GK	Kaisla Lyytikäinen	3 April 2009 (aged 17)	(Football Association of Finland) FC Espoo
2	DF	Helmi Kupila	5 January 2009 (aged 17)	(Football Association of Finland) PK-35 Vantaa
4	DF	Ulrika Sarelius	26 November 2009 (aged 16)	(Football Association of Finland) HJK
5	DF	Elin Brandt	8 July 2009 (aged 16)	(Football Association of Finland) HJK
18	DF	Karla Kivimäki	23 May 2009 (aged 16)	(Football Association of Finland) FC Honka
3	MF	Matilda Krause	18 June 2009 (aged 16)	(Football Association of Finland) HJK
6	MF	Miona Selkälä	10 July 2009 (aged 16)	(Football Association of Finland) ONS
7	MF	Aada Mandelin	23 June 2009 (aged 16)	(Football Association of Finland) HJK
8	MF	Tuulianna Artti	14 March 2010 (aged 16)	(Football Association of Finland) PKKU
13	MF	Moona Nurminen	25 March 2009 (aged 17)	(Football Association of Finland) HPS
14	MF	Matilda Eskola	7 January 2010 (aged 16)	(Football Association of Finland) HJK
15	MF	Aino Lamberg	3 April 2009 (aged 17)	(Football Association of Finland) HPS
16	MF	Hertta Ahonen	4 October 2010 (aged 15)	(Football Association of Finland) Ilves
20	MF	Iida Surakka	30 June 2009 (aged 16)	(Football Association of Finland) PKKU
9	FW	Isabella Ylätalo	22 May 2009 (aged 16)	(Football Association of Finland) HJK
10	FW	Juliet Välkky	22 November 2009 (aged 16)	(Royal Spanish Football Federation) CF Damm
17	FW	Anni Pulkkanen	30 April 2009 (aged 17)	(Football Association of Finland) KuPS
19	FW	Mira Säikkö	10 June 2010 (aged 15)	(Football Association of Finland) HJK
21	FW	Olivia Oulasvirta	25 December 2010 (aged 15)	(Football Association of Finland) HJK

=== France ===
Head coach: Franck Plenecassagne

The squad was announced on 20 April 2026.

No.	Pos.	Player	Date of birth (age)	Club
1	GK	Clélia Ducreux	19 August 2009 (aged 16)	(French Football Federation) Dijon
16	GK	Garance Dekyndt	28 August 2009 (aged 16)	(French Football Federation) Le Havre
2	DF	Emma Motyka	1 April 2009 (aged 17)	(French Football Federation) OL Lyonnes
3	DF	Mayre Bento	12 July 2009 (aged 16)	(French Football Federation) Toulouse
4	DF	Noelie Chovin	27 August 2009 (aged 16)	(French Football Federation) Saint-Étienne
5	DF	Elen Roux	14 April 2009 (aged 17)	(French Football Federation) Stade Rennais
13	DF	Angéline Girardot	13 May 2009 (aged 16)	(French Football Federation) Dijon
15	DF	Rosie Olando	23 January 2009 (aged 17)	(French Football Federation) OL Lyonnes
6	MF	Odélia Tae	23 December 2009 (aged 16)	(French Football Federation) Paris
7	MF	Léa Motyka	1 April 2009 (aged 17)	(French Football Federation) OL Lyonnes
8	MF	Diénébou Niakate	1 March 2009 (aged 17)	(French Football Federation) PSG
10	MF	Maelys Ane	20 March 2009 (aged 17)	(French Football Federation) OL Lyonnes
11	MF	Elsa Prezelin	13 November 2009 (aged 16)	(French Football Federation) Nantes
12	MF	Elise Dhalluin	22 May 2009 (aged 16)	(French Football Federation) Lille
14	MF	Sharlie Yerro	7 February 2009 (aged 17)	(French Football Federation) Paris
17	MF	Lisa Mabilon	7 September 2009 (aged 16)	(French Football Federation) Montpellier
9	FW	Margot Collin	12 June 2009 (aged 16)	(French Football Federation) Le Havre
18	FW	Candice Thomas	6 April 2009 (aged 17)	(French Football Federation) PSG
19	FW	Méhisane Zidi	6 April 2009 (aged 17)	(French Football Federation) OL Lyonnes
20	FW	Rachael Adedini	20 June 2009 (aged 16)	(The Football Association) Manchester City

=== Poland ===
Head coach: Paulina Kawalec

The squad was announced on 23 April 2026.

No.	Pos.	Player	Date of birth (age)	Club
1	GK	Dominika Lemańczyk	24 July 2009 (aged 16)	(Polish Football Association) UKS SMS Łódź
22	GK	Hanna Buchta	12 February 2009 (aged 17)	(Polish Football Association) Rekord Bielsko-Biała
3	DF	Lena Saja	21 August 2009 (aged 16)	(Polish Football Association) Czarni Sosnowiec
4	DF	Zuzanna Zakrzewska	10 April 2009 (aged 17)	(Polish Football Association) Tęcza Bydgoszcz
5	DF	Zofia Świtała	11 March 2009 (aged 17)	(Polish Football Association) Czarni Sosnowiec
13	DF	Helena Zarzycka	17 May 2010 (aged 15)	(Polish Football Association) Diamenty Warszawa
20	DF	Maja Wiśniewska	24 November 2009 (aged 16)	(Polish Football Association) KKP Bydgoszcz
21	DF	Michalina Wiśniewska	18 March 2010 (aged 16)	(Polish Football Association) Lech Poznań
6	MF	Wiktoria Zgrzeba	6 November 2009 (aged 16)	(Polish Football Association) Pogoń Szczecin
7	MF	Oliwia Grewling	17 October 2009 (aged 16)	(Polish Football Association) Pogoń Szczecin
10	MF	Hanna Blicharska	16 August 2010 (aged 15)	(German Football Association) Bayern Munich
11	MF	Nikola Gałuszka	27 December 2009 (aged 16)	(Polish Football Association) Czarni Sosnowiec
14	MF	Zofia Burzan	30 May 2009 (aged 16)	(Polish Football Association) Czarni Sosnowiec
16	MF	Lena Januszyńska	18 February 2010 (aged 16)	(Polish Football Association) Górnik Łęczna
18	MF	Marta Kwiatkowska	18 January 2009 (aged 17)	(Polish Football Association) Lech Poznań
19	MF	Blanka Zając	5 January 2009 (aged 17)	(Polish Football Association) Pogoń Szczecin
9	FW	Sofia Cendrowska	2 November 2010 (aged 15)	(Swedish Football Association) Djursholm
15	FW	Lidia Kulka	3 May 2009 (aged 17)	(Polish Football Association) UJ Kraków
17	FW	Amelia Guzenda	6 February 2009 (aged 17)	(Polish Football Association) Lech Poznań
23	FW	Maja Grzechnik	4 May 2010 (aged 16)	(Polish Football Association) Rekord Bielsko-Biała

=== Spain ===
Head coach: Milagros Martínez Domínguez

The squad was announced on 20 April 2026.

No.	Pos.	Player	Date of birth (age)	Club
1	GK	Antia Veiga	9 May 2009 (aged 16)	(Royal Spanish Football Federation) Deportivo La Coruña
13	GK	Goiatz Ferráz	11 January 2010 (aged 16)	(Royal Spanish Football Federation) Athletic Club
2	DF	Maialen Valladares	20 January 2010 (aged 16)	(Royal Spanish Football Federation) Athletic Club
3	DF	Charlotta Ohlander	22 June 2010 (aged 15)	(Royal Spanish Football Federation) Barcelona
4	DF	Abril Díaz	8 February 2010 (aged 16)	(Royal Spanish Football Federation) Real Madrid
5	DF	Abril Rius	6 April 2009 (aged 17)	(Royal Spanish Football Federation) Barcelona
17	DF	Iraia Fernández	26 July 2009 (aged 16)	(Royal Spanish Football Federation) Athletic Club
18	DF	Maddi Martín Iglesias	11 July 2010 (aged 15)	(Royal Spanish Football Federation) Athletic Club
6	MF	Avril Serrano	16 February 2009 (aged 17)	(Royal Spanish Football Federation) Barcelona
8	MF	Laia Cabetas	6 August 2009 (aged 16)	(Royal Spanish Football Federation) Barcelona
10	MF	Vera Molina	24 April 2009 (aged 17)	(Royal Spanish Football Federation) Granada
12	MF	Ángela Gálvez	22 June 2010 (aged 15)	(Royal Spanish Football Federation) Real Betis
15	MF	Carolina Ferrera	20 February 2010 (aged 16)	(Royal Spanish Football Federation) Barcelona
16	MF	Elena Vizuete	19 February 2010 (aged 16)	(Royal Spanish Football Federation) Barcelona
7	FW	Ángela Vieco	18 March 2009 (aged 17)	(Royal Spanish Football Federation) Atlético Madrid
9	FW	Lidia Gibert	19 March 2010 (aged 16)	(Royal Spanish Football Federation) Barcelona
11	FW	Candela Rodríguez	19 April 2009 (aged 17)	(Royal Spanish Football Federation) Real Madrid
14	FW	María Aymerich	14 August 2009 (aged 16)	(Royal Spanish Football Federation) Madrid CFF
19	FW	Rocío Elaine	30 March 2009 (aged 17)	(Royal Spanish Football Federation) Atlético Madrid
20	FW	Carlota Chacón	4 April 2009 (aged 17)	(Royal Spanish Football Federation) Real Sociedad
