= Liv Pennock =

Dutch footballer (born 2008)

Personal information
- Full name: Liv Anne Pennock
- Date of birth: 27 February 2008 (age 18)
- Height: 1.81 m (5 ft 11 in)
- Position: Forward

Team information
- Current team: FC Barcelona
- Number: 37

Youth career
- VV Bennekom
- Twente

Senior career*
| Years | Team | Apps | (Gls) |
| 2026– | Twente | 10 | (2) |

International career^{‡}
| 2023 | Netherlands U15 | 4 | (0) |
| 2024 | Netherlands U16 | 9 | (1) |
| 2024–2025 | Netherlands U17 | 17 | (2) |
| 2026– | Netherlands U19 | 6 | (3) |
Medal record
Women's football
Representing Netherlands
FIFA U-17 Women's World Cup
| Runner-up | 2025 Morocco |
UEFA Women's Under-17 Championship
| Winner | 2025 Faroe Islands |
- * Club domestic league appearances and goals as of 8 May 2026 ‡ National team caps and goals as of 17 April 2026

Liv Anne Pennock (born 27 February 2008) is a Dutch footballer who plays as a forward for Vrouwen Eredivisie club Twente. She helped lead the Netherlands under-17 team to the 2025 FIFA U-17 Women's World Cup final.

== Club career ==
Pennock played for the academy of VV Bennekom before joining FC Twente at age 15. On 17 January 2026, she made her first-team debut for Twente, equalizing off the bench in a 1–1 draw with Ajax.

On 30 March 2026, it was announced that Pennock would join Barcelona B in the 2026–27 season.

== International career ==
Pennock helped lead the Netherlands under-17 team to win the 2025 UEFA Women's Under-17 Championship, the program's first title in this category. In the semifinals, she opened the scoring against France. Later that year, she led the squad to the 2025 FIFA U-17 Women's World Cup final, scoring twice at the tournament.

== Honours ==
Netherlands U17

- UEFA Women's Under-17 Championship: 2025
- FIFA U-17 Women's World Cup runner-up: 2025

Individual

- UEFA Women's Under-17 Championship Team of the Tournament: 2025
