= Weronika Araśniewicz =

Polish footballer (born 2008)

Personal information
- Date of birth: 15 March 2008 (age 18)
- Place of birth: Warsaw, Poland
- Height: 1.72 m (5 ft 8 in)
- Position: Midfielder

Team information
- Current team: VfL Wolfsburg
- Number: 15

Youth career
- –2022: UKS SP11 Ursus Warsaw
- 2022–2023: Diamenty Warsaw

Senior career*
Years	Team	Apps	(Gls)
2023–2024	Diamenty Warsaw	2	(4)
2024–2026	FC Barcelona C		
2025–2026	→ VfL Wolfsburg II (loan)	15	(4)
2026–	VfL Wolfsburg	2	(1)

International career^{‡}
2022	Poland U15	3	(2)
2023–2024	Poland U17	28	(10)
2025–	Poland U19	15	(8)
2026–	Poland U20	3	(0)
2026–	Poland	3	(0)
Medal record
Women's football
Representing Poland
2024 UEFA Under-17 Championship
Third place	2024 Sweden
- * Club domestic league appearances and goals as of 21:45, 8 September 2026 (UTC) ‡ National team caps and goals as of 18:45, 13 September 2026 (UTC)

Weronika Araśniewicz (born 15 March 2008) is a Polish professional footballer who plays as a midfielder for Frauen-Bundesliga club VfL Wolfsburg and the Poland national team.

== Club career ==
=== Diamenty Warsaw ===
Araśniewicz joined Diamenty Warsaw in 2022.

=== FC Barcelona C ===
On 31 July 2024, Spanish side FC Barcelona C announced the signing of Araśniewicz.

=== Wolfsburg ===
On 2 July 2025, Araśniewicz was sent on a season-long to German club VfL Wolfsburg, joining their under-20 team in the 2. Frauen-Bundesliga.

On 16 July 2026, VfL Wolfsburg activated the buy option in Araśniewicz's loan deal, and promoted her to the senior team after signing a two-year deal.

== International career ==
Araśniewicz participated in the 2024 UEFA Women's Under-17 Championship, leading Poland under-17s to third place.

During the 2025 UEFA Women's Under-19 Championship, she scored three goals in three games as Poland exited the tournament at the group stage.

Araśniewicz made her debut for the senior national team on 7 March 2026 in a 4–1 loss to France in a 2027 FIFA World Cup qualifier.

== Career statistics ==
=== International ===
As of match played 5 June 2026

Appearances and goals by national team and year
National team	Year	Apps	Goals
Poland
Poland	2026	3	0
Total		3	0

== Honours ==
Diamenty Warsaw

- III liga, group I: 2023–24

Poland U17

- UEFA Women's Under-17 Championship third place: 2024

Individual

- UEFA Women's Under-17 Championship Team of the Tournament: 2024
