= 2012 UEFA Women's Under-17 Championship qualification =

Football tournament qualification stage

The 2012 UEFA Women's Under-17 Championship qualification were two rounds of qualifying tournaments for the 2012 UEFA Women's Under-17 Championship, which was held in Switzerland.

With the debut of Bosnia and Herzegovina a new record of 42 participating nations was set. The 42 UEFA members with the exception of Germany and Netherlands, which received a bye, were divided into 10 groups of four teams, with each group being contested as a mini-tournament, hosted by one of the group's teams. After all matches were played, the 10 group winners and the four best runners-up advanced to the second round.

The draw was made on 16 November 2010. Matches were played from 29 September 2011 to 22 October 2011.

== First round ==
=== Seeding ===
The seedings were assigned according to the Under-17 coefficient ranking. There were three pots, with the ten highest ranked teams in Pot A, the next ten in Pot B and the rest in Pot C.

- Pot A

France, Spain, Norway, Sweden, England, Republic of Ireland, Denmark, Switzerland, Czech Republic, Scotland

- Pot B

Finland, Hungary, Ukraine, Italy, Belgium, Poland, Russia, Wales, Iceland, Turkey

- Pot C

Serbia, Macedonia, Austria, Slovenia, Lithuania, Faroe Islands, Kazakhstan, Croatia, Belarus, Israel, Romania, Azerbaijan, Latvia, Greece, Estonia, Northern Ireland, Bulgaria, Moldova, Georgia, Bosnia and Herzegovina

The hosts of the eleven one-venue mini-tournament groups are indicated below in italics.

=== Tiebreakers ===
Tie-breakers between teams with the same number of points are:

1. Higher number of points obtained in the matches played between the teams in question
2. Superior goal difference resulting from the matches played between the teams in question
3. Higher number of goals scored in the matches played between the teams in question

If now two teams still are tied, reapply tie-breakers 1–3, if this does not break the tie, go on.

1. Superior goal difference in all group matches
2. Higher number of goals scored in all group matches
3. Drawing of lots

=== Group 1 ===
Team	Pld	W	D	L	GF	GA	GD	Pts
Switzerland	3	3	0	0	34	2	+32	9
Poland	3	2	0	1	19	2	+17	6
Latvia	3	1	0	2	1	21	−20	3
Georgia	3	0	0	3	1	30	−29	0

15 October 2011
12:00

Poland	6–0	Latvia
Pajor 5', 34', 69'; Ņikiforova 32' (o.g.); Szaj 63' (pen.); Jaszek 79'	Report

Miejski Osrodek Sportu, Biała Podlaska
Attendance: 200
Referee: Zuzana Strpkova (Slovakia)
15 October 2011
15:00

Switzerland	17–1	Georgia
Ribeaud 1', 43', 52', 64', 73'; Stöckli 4', 28'; Wuichet 6', 13', 20', 31'; Pulver 8', 70'; Sac 24'; Guchmanidze 40' (o.g.); Deplazes 57', 62'	Report	Cheminava 54'

Stadion Miejski, Radzyń
Attendance: 150
Referee: Kadriye Gökçek (Turkey)

17 October 2011
15:00

Switzerland	15–0	Latvia
Sac 6', 15', 33'; Stöckli 13', 22', 61', 79'; Ribeaud 18', 51'; Wuichet 39', 49', 72'; Pulver 53'; Calo 74', 75'	Report

Stadion Miejski, Radzyń
Attendance: 200
Referee: Zuzana Strpkova (Slovakia)
17 October 2011
15:00

Georgia	0–12	Poland
	Report	Pajor 3', 30', 64'; Wróblewska 7'; Sobkowicz 8', 51', 69'; Szaj 24', 38', 41', 44'; Kaletka 40'

AWF, Biała Podlaska
Attendance: 350
Referee: Evgenia Kaskantiri (Greece)

20 October 2011
15:00

Poland	1–2	Switzerland
Wróblewska 43'	Report	Maritz 35'; Pulver 62'

AWF, Biała Podlaska
Attendance: 500
Referee: Kadriye Gökçek (Turkey)
20 October 2011
15:00

Latvia	1–0	Georgia
Fedotova 3'	Report

Stadion Miejski, Radzyń
Attendance: 50
Referee: Evgenia Kaskantiri (Greece)

=== Group 2 ===
Team	Pld	W	D	L	GF	GA	GD	Pts
Republic of Ireland	3	2	1	0	10	3	+7	7
Romania	3	2	0	1	11	6	+5	6
Italy	3	1	1	1	9	4	+5	4
Macedonia	3	0	0	3	1	18	−17	0

10 October 2011

Republic of Ireland	3–2	Romania
Shine 15'; McCabe 76' (pen.); McGuinness 79'		Lunca 57'; Nica 80'

10 October 2011

Italy	6–0	Macedonia
Malatesta 45'; Barbieri 54', 56', 79'; Montecucco 72', 75'

12 October 2011

Romania	3–2	Italy
Obreja 16'; Lunca 29'; Cosma 78'		Galli 17'; Barbieri 59'

12 October 2011

Republic of Ireland	6–0	Macedonia
Barrett 7'; Shine 15', 44', 79'; McGuinness 18'; Monaghan 81'

15 October 2011

Italy	1–1	Republic of Ireland
Montecuicco 72'		Piacezzi 54' (o.g.)

15 October 2011

Macedonia	1–6	Romania
Jakovska 16'		Lunca 4', 14', 20', 71'; Obreja 46'; Filler 63'

=== Group 3 ===
Team	Pld	W	D	L	GF	GA	GD	Pts
Sweden	3	3	0	0	21	0	+21	9
Hungary	3	2	0	1	7	5	+2	6
Croatia	3	0	1	2	2	12	−10	1
Bulgaria	3	0	1	2	2	15	−13	1

17 October 2011

Hungary	3–0	Bulgaria
Diószegi 9' (pen.), 51'; Zeller 25'

17 October 2011

Sweden	6–0	Croatia
F. Andersson 16', 34'; Banušić 21' (pen.), 28'; Hedell 33'; Hurtig 50'

19 October 2011

Croatia	0–4	Hungary
		Diószegi 19' (pen.); Zeller 34'; Vöfély 43'; Kókany 70'

19 October 2011

Sweden	10–0	Bulgaria
Banušić 6', 12', 14', 19', 38', 80'; Magnusson 13'; Törnros 16'; Mal. Andersson 28'; F. Andersson 50'

22 October 2011

Bulgaria	2–2	Croatia
Popadinova 24', 55'		Conjar 27'; Gaiser 73'

22 October 2011

Hungary	0–5	Sweden
		Banušić 12', 55', 68'; Hurtig 33'; Skyltbäck 72'

=== Group 4 ===
Team	Pld	W	D	L	GF	GA	GD	Pts
Norway	3	3	0	0	17	1	+16	9
Russia	3	2	0	1	6	4	+2	6
Slovenia	3	1	0	2	7	8	−1	3
Lithuania	3	0	0	3	0	17	−17	0

2 October 2011

Norway	4–1	Slovenia
Jensen 21'; Wedaa 49'; Naalsund 60', 73'		Rupreht 46'

2 October 2011

Russia	2–0	Lithuania
Samoylova 28'; Belomyttseva 46'

4 October 2011

Slovenia	2–4	Russia
Rogan 36'; Kos 73' (pen.)		Samoylova 3'; Piskunova 13', 33', 53'

4 October 2011

Norway	11–0	Lithuania
Åsland 6'; Wedaa 11', 15', 20'; Sævik 13'; Eikeland 34', 40', 55', 65'; Tomter 40'; Hansen 77'

7 October 2011

Lithuania	0–4	Slovenia
		Rupreht 9', 15'; Lombar 18', 49'

7 October 2011

Russia	0–2	Norway
		Eikeland 52'; Åsland 79'

=== Group 5 ===
Team	Pld	W	D	L	GF	GA	GD	Pts
France	3	3	0	0	23	1	+22	9
Wales	3	1	0	2	1	6	−5	3
Moldova	3	1	0	2	2	9	−7	3
Faroe Islands	3	1	0	2	1	11	−10	3

14 October 2011

France	10–0	Faroe Islands
Blanchard 8', 9'; Toletti 11'; Saulnier 17'; Declercq 35'; Gearain 46', 78'; Cousin 48'; Diani 66', 68'

14 October 2011

Wales	0–1	Moldova
		Cerescu 63'

16 October 2011

Faroe Islands	0–1	Wales
		Hignett 66'

16 October 2011

France	8–1	Moldova
Mbock 20'; Declercq 33', 36'; Toletti 48', 83'; Diani 72', 81'; Gearain 80'		Gurdiși 52'

19 October 2011

Moldova	0–1	Faroe Islands
		Jacobsen 10'

19 October 2011

Wales	0–5	France
		Diani 3'; Cousin 13', 41'; Declercq 20'; Toletti 58'

=== Group 6 ===
Team	Pld	W	D	L	GF	GA	GD	Pts
England	3	3	0	0	10	4	+6	9
Finland	3	2	0	1	13	6	+7	6
Israel	3	1	0	2	3	12	−9	3
Northern Ireland	3	0	0	3	4	8	−4	0

11 October 2011

England	4–1	Israel
Zelem 23', 46'; Fergusson 36'; Williams 55'		Fleitman 32'

11 October 2011

Finland	4–2	Northern Ireland
Säppi 10' (pen.); Lönnqvist 17'; Kuikka 21'; Lindgren 39'		Brennan 40'; Curran 72' (pen.)

13 October 2011

Israel	0–7	Finland
		Säppi 7', 33'; Saastamoinen 12', 53'; Ritvanen 16'; Lindgren 21'; Koivula 62'

13 October 2011

England	2–1	Northern Ireland
Zelem 7'; Stringer 69'		Foy 44'

16 October 2011

Finland	2–4	England
Kuikka 25'; Koivula 58'		Ayane 6'; Zelem 9'; Stringer 11'; Kelsh 29'

16 October 2011

Northern Ireland	1–2	Israel
Feehan 19'		Awad 7'; Foy 43' (o.g.)

=== Group 7 ===
Team	Pld	W	D	L	GF	GA	GD	Pts
Denmark	3	2	1	0	11	3	+8	7
Serbia	3	2	1	0	9	5	+4	7
Turkey	3	1	0	2	6	7	−1	3
Greece	3	0	0	3	0	11	−11	0

29 September 2011

Denmark	6–0	Greece
Jakobsen 11', 51', 55'; Hansen 64', 67'; Brøndum-Jensen 79'

29 September 2011
15:30

Turkey	3–4	Serbia
Topçu 11', 68'; Duran 74'	Report	28' Delić; 37' Čanković; 49', 75' Đorđević

Stadion Mirko Vučurević, Banatski Dvor
Referee: Irina Turovskaya (Belarus)

1 October 2011

Denmark	2–2	Serbia
Hansen 18'; Brøndum-Jensen 80'		Milivojević 37'; Djordjević 73'

1 October 2011
15:30

Greece	0–2	Turkey
	Report	53' Başkol; 58' Aydın

Karađoredev Park, Zrenjanin
Referee: Irina Turovskaya (Belarus)

4 October 2011
15:30

Turkey	1–3	Denmark
Topçu 37' (pen.)	Report	4' Brøndum Jensen; 40', 77' Hansen

Stadion Mirko Vučurević, Banatski Dvor
Referee: Amy Rayner (England)
4 October 2011

Serbia	3–0	Greece
Čanković 44'; Djordjević 72'; Lazarević 80'

=== Group 8 ===
Team	Pld	W	D	L	GF	GA	GD	Pts
Belgium	3	2	1	0	12	0	+12	7
Czech Republic	3	2	1	0	11	0	+11	7
Belarus	3	1	0	2	4	9	−5	3
Estonia	3	0	0	3	0	18	−18	0

30 September 2011

Czech Republic	5–0	Belarus
Krejčiříková 2'; Svitková 39', 67'; Hloupá 53'; Rychtarova 55'

30 September 2011

Belgium	8–0	Estonia
Vilipuu 4' (o.g.); Aertsen 9', 40', 50'; Leynen 38'; Wajnblum 45', 75'; Van Wynendaele 79'

2 October 2011

Belarus	0–4	Belgium
		Michez 17', 67'; Wajnblum 24', 29'

2 October 2011

Czech Republic	6–0	Estonia
Krejčiříková 10'; Dlasková 31'; Hloupá 46'; Winterová 47'; Svitková 58', 80'

5 October 2011

Estonia	0–4	Belarus
		Duben 16'; Krasnova 32', 42', 78'

5 October 2011

Belgium	0–0	Czech Republic

=== Group 9 ===
Team	Pld	W	D	L	GF	GA	GD	Pts
Spain	3	3	0	0	20	0	+20	9
Bosnia and Herzegovina	3	2	0	1	5	8	−3	6
Ukraine	3	1	0	2	4	10	−6	3
Azerbaijan	3	0	0	3	1	12	−11	0

30 September 2011

Ukraine	3–0	Azerbaijan
Kozyrenko 31' (pen.), 69'; Malakhova 53'

30 September 2011

Spain	6–0	Bosnia and Herzegovina
Núria Mendoza 34' (pen.), 38'; Carla Puiggrós 39', 68'; Alba Pomares 59'; Ana López 72'

2 October 2011

Bosnia and Herzegovina	3–1	Ukraine
Zukić 17'; Omerović 40'; Šešlija 66'		Korsun 50'

2 October 2011

Spain	7–0	Azerbaijan
Sonia Fraile 9', 60' (pen.); Blanca Rubio 30'; Mapi León 45'; Alba Pomares 52'; Gabriela Morales 55'; Mónica 74'

5 October 2011

Ukraine	0–7	Spain
		Alba Pomares 4', 13'; Sonia Fraile 11', 17', 43' (pen.); Carla Puiggrós 24', 34'

5 October 2011

Azerbaijan	1–2	Bosnia and Herzegovina
Sarialtin 7'		Kapetanović 2'; Semić 69'

=== Group 10 ===
Team	Pld	W	D	L	GF	GA	GD	Pts
Iceland	3	2	1	0	7	3	+4	7
Scotland	3	1	2	0	6	3	+3	5
Austria	3	1	1	1	13	3	+10	4
Kazakhstan	3	0	0	3	0	17	−17	0

7 October 2011

Scotland	3–0	Kazakhstan
Richardson 44'; Graham 61'; Weir 76'

7 October 2011

Iceland	2–1	Austria
Einarsdóttir 45'; Guðmundsdóttir 51'		Gatea 65'

9 October 2011

Kazakhstan	0–3	Iceland
		Viggósdóttir 19', 50'; Eliasdóttir 80'

9 October 2011

Scotland	1–1	Austria
Arnott 28'		Billa 14'

12 October 2011

Iceland	2–2	Scotland
Hannesdóttir 17'; Agustsdottir 61'		Weir 71'; Ness 75'

12 October 2011

Austria	11–0	Kazakhstan
Billa 4', 26', 35', 45', 63', 70', 80'; Schwarzlmüller 24'; Stockinger 36'; Maierhofer 41', 76'

=== Ranking of Runners-up teams ===
To determine the four best runners-up from the first qualifying round, only the results against the winners and third-placed teams in each group were taken into account.

The following criteria are applied to determine the rankings:

1. higher number of points obtained in these matches
2. superior goal difference from these matches
3. higher number of goals scored in these matches
4. fair play conduct of the teams in all group matches in the first qualifying round
5. drawing of lots

Grp	Team	Pld	W	D	L	GF	GA	GD	Pts
8	Czech Republic	2	1	1	0	5	0	+5	4
7	Serbia	2	1	1	0	6	5	+1	4
6	Finland	2	1	0	1	9	4	+5	3
1	Poland	2	1	0	1	7	2	+5	3
2	Romania	2	1	0	1	5	5	0	3
4	Russia	2	1	0	1	4	4	0	3
3	Hungary	2	1	0	1	4	5	−1	3
9	Bosnia and Herzegovina	2	1	0	1	3	7	−4	3
10	Scotland	2	0	2	0	3	3	0	2
5	Wales	2	0	0	2	0	6	−6	0

== Second round ==
The ten group winners and the four best runners-up joined Germany and the Netherlands in the second round. There were four groups of four teams each. The four group winners advanced to the final round. The draw was held on 15 November 2011. The second round was played from 19 March 2012 to 1 May 2012.

Hosts of each mini-tournament are marked in italics.

=== Group 1 ===
Team	Pld	W	D	L	GF	GA	GD	Pts
Switzerland	3	2	1	0	5	3	2	7
Iceland	3	2	0	1	4	2	2	6
England	3	1	0	2	1	2	−1	3
Belgium	3	0	1	2	4	7	−3	1

13 April 2012
15:00

Switzerland	3–3	Belgium
Pulver 6'; Stöckli 80'; Castignetti 80+2'	Report	Aertsen 17', 77'; Van De Voorde 41'

SW Harelbeke, Harelbeke
Referee: Konstantina Mpoumpouri (Greece)

13 April 2012
18:00

England	0–1	Iceland
	Report	Jessen 14'

KVK Ypres, Ypres
Referee: Eszter Urban (Hungary)

15 April 2012
15:00

Switzerland	1–0	Iceland
Ribeaud 47'	Report

KFC Popereinge, Poperinge
Referee: Ana Jovanović (Serbia)

15 April 2012
17:30

Belgium	0–1	England
	Report	Williams 21'

KVK Ypres, Ypres
Referee: Eszter Urban (Hungary)

18 April 2012
18:00

England	0–1	Switzerland
	Report	Ribeaud 40'

SW Harelbeke, Harelbeke
Referee: Konstantina Mpoumpouri (Greece)

18 April 2012
18:00

Iceland	3–1	Belgium
Jensen 4', 40'; Sigurdardóttir 73'	Report	Koenig 68'

KFC Popereinge, Poperinge
Referee: Ana Jovanović (Serbia)

=== Group 2 ===
Team	Pld	W	D	L	GF	GA	GD	Pts
France	3	3	0	0	12	0	+12	9
Norway	3	2	0	1	3	4	−1	6
Republic of Ireland	3	1	0	2	1	6	−5	3
Poland	3	0	0	3	0	6	−6	0

19 March 2012
14:00

France	4–0	Republic of Ireland
Toletti 56'; Bathy 61'; Atamaniuk 66'; Declercq 80+3'	Report

Briskebyen Park, Hamar
Referee: Giovanna Farinelli (Italy)

19 March 2012
17:15

Norway	1–0	Poland
Eikeland 33'	Report

Briskebyen Park, Hamar
Referee: Olga Zadinová (Czech Republic)

21 March 2012
14:00

France	4–0	Poland
Toletti 26' (pen.); Blanchard 35', 65'; Atamaniuk 74'	Report

Briskebyen Park, Hamar
Referee: Eleni Lampadariou (Greece)
21 March 2012
17:15

Republic of Ireland	0–2	Norway
	Report	Eikeland 13'; Kvamme 39'

Briskebyen Park, Hamar
Referee: Olga Zadinová (Czech Republic)

24 March 2012
13:00

Norway	0–4	France
	Report	Romanelli 5'; Declercq 12', 70'; Blanchard 74'

Gjemselund Stadion, Kongsvinger
Referee: Giovanna Farinelli (Italy)

24 March 2012
13:00

Poland	0–1	Republic of Ireland
	Report	Farrell 28'

Briskebyen Park, Hamar
Referee: Eleni Lampadariou (Greece)

=== Group 3 ===
Team	Pld	W	D	L	GF	GA	GD	Pts
Denmark	3	2	1	0	5	1	+4	7
Sweden	3	1	1	1	4	4	0	4
Netherlands	3	1	0	2	4	5	−1	3
Finland	3	1	0	2	4	7	−3	3

26 April 2012
15:00

Sweden	3–2	Finland
Hedell 28'; Törnros 36'; Hallin 54'	Report	Saastamoinen 53'; Peltonen 76'

Brøndby Stadium, Brøndby
Referee: Evgenia Kaskantiri (Greece)

26 April 2012
18:00

Netherlands	1–2	Denmark
Miedema 6'	Report	Poulsen 16'; Hansen 23' (pen.)

Gentofte Stadium, Gentofte
Referee: Kadriye Gökçek (Turkey)

28 April 2012
12:00

Netherlands	1–2	Finland
Drost 37'	Report	Tunturi 18'; Janssen 80' (o.g.)

Ballerup Stadium, Ballerup
Referee: Nelli Stepanyan (Armenia)

28 April 2012
15:00

Denmark	0–0	Sweden
	Report

Brøndby Stadium, Brøndby
Referee: Evgenia Kaskantiri (Greece)

1 May 2012
16:00

Sweden	1–2	Netherlands
Hallin 10'	Report	A. Bosveld 72'; Miedema 80+3'

Gentofte Stadium, Gentofte
Referee: Kadriye Gökçek (Turkey)

1 May 2012
16:00

Finland	0–3	Denmark
	Report	Hansen 3', 68'; Fisker 80+4'

Ballerup Stadium, Ballerup
Referee: Nelli Stepanyan (Armenia)

=== Group 4 ===
Team	Pld	W	D	L	GF	GA	GD	Pts
Germany	3	3	0	0	9	0	+9	9
Spain	3	2	0	1	9	5	+4	6
Czech Republic	3	0	1	2	2	6	−4	1
Serbia	3	0	1	2	4	13	−9	1

10 April 2012
16:00

Germany	2–0	Czech Republic
Leluschko 45', 79'	Report

Pabellón de la Ciudad del Fútbol, Madrid
Referee: Sara Persson (Sweden)

10 April 2012
18:00

Spain	7–2	Serbia
Sánchez 3'; Fraile 32', 40+2'; Esteban 43', 44'; Maitane López 54'; Fernández 73'	Report	Djordjević 5', 16'

Pabellón de la Ciudad del Fútbol, Madrid
Referee: Cristina Bujor (Romania)

12 April 2012
16:00

Germany	4–0	Serbia
Däbritz 23' (pen.), 75'; Wilde 49'; Spengler 73'	Report

Pabellón de la Ciudad del Fútbol, Madrid
Referee: Sharon Sluyts (Belgium)

12 April 2012
18:00

Czech Republic	0–2	Spain
	Report	Esteban 53', 65'

Pabellón de la Ciudad del Fútbol, Madrid
Referee: Cristina Bujor (Romania)

15 April 2012
11:30

Spain	0–3	Germany
	Report	Däbritz 9', 79' (pen.); Wilde 80+3'

Pabellón de la Ciudad del Fútbol, Madrid
Referee: Sara Persson (Sweden)

15 April 2012
11:30

Serbia	2–2	Czech Republic
Pantelić 31', 59'	Report	Hloupá 29'; Svitková 80+2'

Pabellón de la Ciudad del Fútbol, Madrid
Referee: Sharon Sluyts (Belgium)

== Goalscorers ==
11 goals

- (Sweden) Marija Banušić

9 goals

- (Switzerland) Sabrina Ribeaud

8 goals

- (Austria) Nicole Billa
- (Denmark) Sarah Dyrehauge Hansen

7 goals

- (France) Léa Declercq
- (Norway) Amalie Vevle Eikeland
- (Spain) Sonia Fraile
- (Switzerland) Aline Stöckli
- (Switzerland) Audrey Wuichet

6 goals

- (France) Sandie Toletti
- (Poland) Ewa Pajor
- (Romania) Alexandra Lunca
- (Serbia) Tijana Djordjević

5 goals

- (Belgium) Lotte Aertsen
- (Czech Republic) Kateřina Svitková
- (France) Laura Blanchard
- (France) Kadidiatou Diani
- (Poland) Magdalena Szaj
- (Switzerland) Carmen Pulver

4 goals

- (Belgium) Lola Wajnblum
- (England) Katie Zelem
- (Germany) Sara Däbritz
- (Republic of Ireland) Clare Shine
- (Italy) Raffaella Barbieri
- (Norway) Ine Marie Thoresen Wedaa
- (Spain) Andrea Esteban
- (Spain) Alba Pomares
- (Spain) Carla Puiggrós
- (Switzerland) Chantal Sac

3 goals

- (Belarus) Tatiana Krasnova
- (Czech Republic) Lucie Hloupá
- (Denmark) Emilie Brøndum-Jensen
- (Denmark) Laura Jakobsen
- (Finland) Vera Saastamoinen
- (Finland) Julia Säppi
- (France) Pauline Cousin
- (France) Johana Gearain
- (Hungary) Fanni Diószegi
- (Italy) Arianna Montecucco
- (Poland) Agata Sobkowicz
- (Russia) Elmira Piskunova
- (Slovenia) Marija Rupreht
- (Sweden) Fanny Andersson
- (Turkey) Ebru Topçu

2 goals

- (Austria) Sophie Maierhofer
- (Belgium) Lucinda Michez
- (Bulgaria) Evdokiya Popadinova
- (Czech Republic) Tereza Krejčiříková
- (England) Abbey-Leigh Stringer
- (England) Paige Williams
- (Finland) Melinda Koivula
- (Finland) Natalia Kuikka
- (Finland) Taru Lindgren
- (France) Alexandra Atamaniuk
- (France) Griedge Mbock Bathy
- (Germany) Laura Leluschko
- (Germany) Manjou Wilde
- (Hungary) Dóra Zeller
- (Iceland) Elín Metta Jensen
- (Iceland) Glódís Perla Viggósdóttir
- (Republic of Ireland) Gemma McGuinness
- (Netherlands) Vivianne Miedema
- (Norway) Therese Sessy Åsland
- (Norway) Lisa Fjeldstad Naalsund
- (Poland) Joanna Wróblewska
- (Romania) Iulia Obreja
- (Russia) Elina Samoylova
- (Scotland) Caroline Weir
- (Serbia) Jelena Čanković
- (Serbia) Kristina Pantelić
- (Slovenia) Nika Lombar
- (Spain) Núria Mendoza
- (Sweden) Linda Hallin
- (Sweden) Moa Hedell
- (Sweden) Lina Hurtig
- (Sweden) Sandra Törnros
- (Switzerland) Barla Deplazes
- (Switzerland) Francesca Calo
- (Ukraine) Tetyana Kozyrenko

1 goal

- (Austria) Jelena Gatea
- (Austria) Valentina Schwarzlmüller
- (Austria) Adriana Stockinger
- (Azerbaijan) Melis Sarialtin
- (Belarus) Yuliya Duben
- (Belgium) Johanna Koenig
- (Belgium) Silke Leynen
- (Belgium) Laura Van De Voorde
- (Belgium) Elien Van Wynendaele
- (Bosnia and Herzegovina) Selma Kapetanović
- (Bosnia and Herzegovina) Selma Omerović
- (Bosnia and Herzegovina) Merima Semić
- (Bosnia and Herzegovina) Anđela Šešlija
- (Bosnia and Herzegovina) Melisa Zukić
- (Croatia) Monika Conjar
- (Croatia) Gabrijela Gaiser
- (Czech Republic) Anna Dlasková
- (Czech Republic) Eva Rychtarova
- (Czech Republic) Lucie Winterová
- (Denmark) Anna Fisker
- (Denmark) Mille Poulsen
- (England) Rosella Ayane
- (England) Olivia Fergusson
- (England) Hollie Kelsh
- (Faroe Islands) Marianna Jacobsen
- (Finland) Hanna Lönnqvist
- (Finland) Tiia Peltonen
- (Finland) Marika Ritvanen
- (Finland) Julia Tunturi
- (France) Marion Romanelli
- (France) Laurie Saulnier
- (Georgia (country)) Ana Cheminava
- (Germany) Jana Spengler
- (Hungary) Regina Kókany
- (Hungary) Noémi Vöfély
- (Iceland) Berglind Ros Agustsdóttir
- (Iceland) Lára Einarsdóttir
- (Iceland) Eva Lind Eliasdóttir
- (Iceland) Svava Rós Guðmundsdóttir
- (Iceland) Hanna Kristin Hannesdóttir
- (Iceland) Sandra Jessen
- (Iceland) Ingibjörg Sigurdardóttir
- (Republic of Ireland) Amber Barrett
- (Republic of Ireland) Michelle Farrell
- (Republic of Ireland) Katie McCabe
- (Republic of Ireland) Ann Monaghan
- (Israel) Marian Awad
- (Israel) Soffer Fleitman
- (Italy) Aurora Galli
- (Italy) Matilde Malatesta
- (Latvia) Renāte Fedotova
- (North Macedonia) Eli Jakovska
- (Moldova) Cristina Cerescu
- (Moldova) Victoria Gurdiși
- (Netherlands) Anne Bosveld
- (Netherlands) Chelly Drost
- (Northern Ireland) Lauren Brennan
- (Northern Ireland) Aoife Curran
- (Northern Ireland) Moya Feehan
- (Northern Ireland) Jessica Foy
- (Norway) Sigrid Heien Hansen
- (Norway) Synne Jensen
- (Norway) Cecilie Kvamme
- (Norway) Karina Sævik
- (Norway) Andrine Tomter
- (Poland) Dżesika Jaszek
- (Poland) Nikola Kaletka
- (Romania) Loredana Cosma
- (Romania) Katalina Filler
- (Romania) Alexandra Nica
- (Russia) Anna Belomyttseva
- (Scotland) Elizabeth Arnott
- (Scotland) Lucy Graham
- (Scotland) Zoe Ness
- (Scotland) Carolina Richardson
- (Serbia) Adrijana Delić
- (Serbia) Aleksandra Lazarević
- (Serbia) Nevena Milivojević
- (Slovenia) Lucija Kos
- (Slovenia) Manja Rogan
- (Spain) Judith Fernández
- (Spain) Mapi León
- (Spain) Ana López
- (Spain) Maitane López
- (Spain) Gabriela Morales
- (Spain) Mónica Orteu
- (Spain) Blanca Rubio Landart
- (Spain) Andrea Sánchez Falcón
- (Sweden) Malin Andersson
- (Sweden) Irma Magnusson
- (Sweden) Amanda Skyltbäck
- (Switzerland) Alessa Castignetti
- (Switzerland) Noelle Maritz
- (Turkey) Kübra Aydın
- (Turkey) Hilal Başkol
- (Turkey) Eda Duran
- (Ukraine) Kateryna Korsun
- (Ukraine) Yana Malakhova
- (Wales) Rachel Hignett

1 own goal

- (Estonia) Anett Vilipuu (against Belgium)
- (Georgia (country)) Juna Guchmanidze (against Switzerland)
- (Italy) Eleonora Piacezzi (against Republic of Ireland)
- (Latvia) Jūlija Ņikiforova (against Poland)
- (Netherlands) Dominique Janssen (against Finland)
- (Northern Ireland) Jessica Foy (against Israel)
