= Greece women's national under-17 football team =

National association football team

Greece Women's U-17
- Association: HFF
- Confederation: UEFA (Europe)
- Head coach: Christos Angelis
- FIFA code: GRE

First international
- Norway 5–0 Greece; 12 September 2009

Biggest win
- Armenia 0–8 Greece; 25 October 2015

Biggest defeat
- Denmark 6–0 Greece; 29 September 2011; Greece 0–6 Spain; 28 October 2015

Greece women's national under-17 football team represents Greece in international youth football competitions.

== Results and fixtures ==
- The following is a list of match results in the last 12 months, as well as any future matches that have been scheduled.

Legend

Win Draw Lose Fixture

=== 2026 ===
10 February 2026 Friendly	Greece	1–3	Portugal	Paiania, Greece
11:00 EET	Vlachonikoli 57'	Report	Ropoki 18' (o.g.); Fontes 86'; Miranda 90+4'	Stadium: EPO Training Ground; Referee: Eleni Antoniou (Greece)

12 February 2026 Friendly	Greece	1–2	Portugal	Paiania, Greece
10:00 EET	Lamprou 58'	Report	Coelho 41'; Delgado 73' (pen.)	Stadium: EPO Training Ground; Referee: Stavroula Lampropoulou (Greece)

12 March 2026 2026 UEFA Women's Under-17 Championship qualification	Switzerland	1–0	Greece	Sarpsborg, Norway
19:00 EET	Steffen 27'	Report		Stadium: Sarpsborg Stadion; Referee: Senida Petak (Bosnia and Herzegovina)

15 March 2026 2026 UEFA Women's Under-17 Championship qualification	Norway	5–0	Greece	Fredrikstad, Norway
14:00 EET	Klæboe–Solemdal 13'; Kechagia 43' (o.g.); Mørch 45+1'; Blindheim 75'; Melgård 86'	Report		Stadium: Fredrikstad Stadion; Referee: Audrey Gerbel (France)

18 March 2026 2026 UEFA Women's Under-17 Championship qualification	Greece	1–3	Scotland	Sarpsborg, Norway
14:00 EET	Velissaridou 75' (pen.)	Report	Taylor 11', 23'; O’Brien 68'	Stadium: Sarpsborg Stadion; Referee: Senida Petak (Bosnia and Herzegovina)

10 September 2026 Friendly	Greece	1–1	Switzerland	Paiania, Greece
11:00 EEST	Chatziioannou 45'	Report	Lecoultre 2'	Stadium: Paiania Training Center

13 September 2026 Friendly	Greece	0–2	Switzerland	Paiania, Greece
11:00 EEST		Report	Winter 20'; Raymond 39'	Stadium: Paiania Training Center

8 November 2026 2027 UEFA Women's Under-17 Championship qualification	Greece	7–0	Moldova	Čatež ob Savi, Slovenia
13:00 EET	Papadaki 7'; Kechagia 18', 70'; Bouronikou 42', 43', 51'; Lamprou 58'	Report		Stadium: Igrišče Terme Čatež; Referee: Tamta Shengelia (Georgia

11 November 2026 2027 UEFA Women's Under-17 Championship qualification	Slovenia	1–1	Greece	Čatež ob Savi, Slovenia
13:00 EET	Klobasa 4'	Report	Bouronikou 8'	Stadium: Igrišče Terme Čatež; Referee: Marta San Juan (Andorra)

Official results and fixtures

== Players ==
=== Current squad ===
As of 11 November 2026

The following 20 players were called up for the 2027 UEFA Women's Under-17 Championship qualification matches to be played on 8 and 11 November 2026 in Slovenia.

No.	Pos.	Player	Date of birth (age)	Caps	Goals	Club
1	GK	Anastasia Kouventari	14 October 2010 (age 16)	14	0	(Hellenic Football Federation) Seirines Grevenon
12	GK	Maria Tsakiri	29 May 2010 (age 16)	0	0	(Hellenic Football Federation) PAOK
2	DF	Spyridoula Papadaki	26 May 2011 (age 15)	4	1	(Hellenic Football Federation) Panathinaikos
3	DF	Myrto Stathakou	19 December 2010 (age 15)	2	0	(Hellenic Football Federation) Asteras Tripolis
4	DF	Afroditi Stefani	15 October 2010 (age 16)	6	0	(Hellenic Football Federation) Volos
5	DF	Marilia Koukoumanou	20 February 2010 (age 16)	7	0	(Hellenic Football Federation) Feidon Argous
8	DF	Eleni Loukoumi	30 May 2011 (age 15)	0	0	(Hellenic Football Federation) Feidon Argous
16	DF	Smaragda Balasi	21 June 2011 (age 15)	4	0	(Hellenic Football Federation) Kifisia
6	MF	Dora Preka	8 February 2010 (age 16)	2	0	(Hellenic Football Federation) Agia Paraskevi
9	MF	Sofia Kechagia (captain)	17 December 2010 (age 15)	13	2	(Hellenic Football Federation) Volos
10	MF	Fenia Moumtzi	23 June 2011 (age 15)	2	0	(Hellenic Football Federation) Diethnis Akadimia 3B
11	MF	Viktoria Spatharaki	16 September 2010 (age 16)	5	0	(Hellenic Football Federation) OFI
14	MF	Alexandra Zanou	17 December 2011 (age 14)	3	0	(Hellenic Football Federation) Atlas Epirus
18	MF	Aggeliki Kotsiri	3 May 2011 (age 15)	2	0	(Hellenic Football Federation) AO Vrilission
20	MF	Anastasia Argyropoulou	1 September 2011 (age 15)	1	0	(Hellenic Football Federation) PAOK
21	MF	Foteini Bouronikou	22 February 2011 (age 15)	4	4	(Hellenic Football Federation) PAOK
7	FW	Maria Nteremidou	15 June 2011 (age 15)	2	0	(Hellenic Football Federation) Doxa 2016
15	FW	Athina Koutsolamprou	4 April 2011 (age 15)	3	0	(Hellenic Football Federation) Elpides Karditsas
17	FW	Agapi Lamprou	17 June 2010 (age 16)	13	3	(Hellenic Football Federation) Agia Paraskevi
19	FW	Marianthi Ropoki	9 January 2011 (age 15)	9	0	(Hellenic Football Federation) Odysseas Moschatou

== Coaching staff ==
=== Current coaching staff ===
Position	Name	Ref.
Head Coach	Christos Angelis	
Goalkeeper Coach	Eleni Peletidou	

== FIFA U-17 Women's World Cup ==
The team has never qualified for the FIFA U-17 Women's World Cup

Year	Result	Matches	Wins	Draws*	Losses	GF	GA
(New Zealand) 2008	Did not qualify						
(Trinidad and Tobago) 2010	Did not qualify						
(Azerbaijan) 2012	Did not qualify						
(Costa Rica) 2014	Did not qualify						
(Jordan) 2016	Did not qualify						
(Uruguay) 2018	Did not qualify						
(India) 2022	Did not qualify						
(Dominican Republic) 2024	Did not qualify						
(Morocco) 2025	Did not qualify						
Total	0/9	0	0	0	0	0	0

== UEFA Women's Under-17 Championship ==
The team has never qualified

Year	Result	GP	W	D	L	GF	GA
(Switzerland) 2008	Did not qualify						
(Switzerland) 2009	Did not qualify						
(Switzerland) 2010	Did not qualify						
(Switzerland) 2011	Did not qualify						
(Switzerland) 2012	Did not qualify						
(Switzerland) 2013	Did not qualify						
(England) 2014	Did not qualify						
(Iceland) 2015	Did not qualify						
(Belarus) 2016	Did not qualify						
(Czech Republic) 2017	Did not qualify						
(Lithuania) 2018	Did not qualify						
(Bulgaria) 2019	Did not qualify						
(Sweden) ~~2020~~	Cancelled						
(Faroe Islands) ~~2021~~	Cancelled						
(Bosnia and Herzegovina) 2022	Did not qualify						
(Estonia) 2023	Did not qualify						
(Sweden) 2024	Did not qualify						
(Faroe Islands) 2025	Did not qualify						
(Northern Ireland) 2026	Did not qualify						
(Finland) 2027	to be determined						
(Belgium) 2028	to be determined						
(Turkey) 2029	to be determined						
Total	0/16	0	0	0	0	0	0

== See also ==
- Greece women's national football team
- Greece women's national under-19 football team
