= Switzerland women's national under-17 football team =

Switzerland Women's U-17
- Nickname: La Nati
- Association: Swiss Football Association
- Confederation: UEFA (Europe)
- Head coach: William Niederhauser
- Most caps: 14 – Audrey Wuichet
- Top scorer: 9 – Sabrina Ribeaud, Audrey Wuichet, Viola Calligaris
- FIFA code: SUI
First colours	Second colours

First international
- Switzerland 5–0 Lithuania (Muttenz, Switzerland, Oct 11, 2007)

Biggest win
- Switzerland 23–0 Georgia (Frauenfeld, Switzerland, Oct 16, 2009)

Biggest defeat
- France 10–2 Switzerland (Tallinn, Estonia, May 23, 2023)

UEFA Women's Under-17 Championship
- Appearances: 3 (first in 2012)
- Best result: Runners-up (2015)

The Switzerland women's national under-17 football team is the national under-17 football team of Switzerland and is governed by the Swiss Football Association.

== FIFA Women's Under-17 World Cup ==
Year	Result	Matches	Wins	Draws*	Losses	GF	GA
(New Zealand) 2008	did not qualify						
(Trinidad and Tobago) 2010	did not qualify						
(Azerbaijan) 2012	did not qualify						
(Costa Rica) 2014	did not qualify						
(Jordan) 2016	did not qualify						
(Uruguay) 2018	did not qualify						
(India) 2022	did not qualify						
(Dominican Republic) 2024	did not qualify						
(Morocco) 2025	did not qualify						
Total	0/9	0	0	0	0	0	0

== UEFA Women's Under-17 Championship ==
Year	Result	MP	W	D	L	GF	GA
(Switzerland) 2008	did not qualify						
(Switzerland) 2009	did not qualify						
(Switzerland) 2010	did not qualify						
(Switzerland) 2011	did not qualify						
(Switzerland) 2012	Fourth place	2	0	1	1	1	5
(Switzerland) 2013	did not qualify						
(England) 2014	did not qualify						
(Iceland) 2015	Runners-up	5	3	1	1	8	8
(Belarus) 2016	did not qualify						
(Czech Republic) 2017	did not qualify						
(Lithuania) 2018	did not qualify						
(Bulgaria) 2019	did not qualify						
(Sweden) ~~2020~~	Cancelled						
(Faroe Islands) ~~2021~~	Cancelled						
(Bosnia and Herzegovina) 2022	did not qualify						
(Estonia) 2023	Semi-finals	4	2	0	2	8	14
(Sweden) 2024	did not qualify						
(Faroe Islands) 2025	did not qualify						
(Northern Ireland) 2026	TBD						
(Finland) 2027	TBD						
(Belgium) 2028	TBD						
(Turkey) 2029	TBD						
Total	2/16	7	3	2	2	9	13

== Results at official competitions ==
Friendly matches are not included. Win Draw Loss

Venue	Date	Opponent	Result	Scorers
2008 UEFA Championship First qualifying round – Group 1
Switzerland; Frauenfeld, Wil and Weinfelden
Switzerland; Frauenfeld, Wil and Weinfelden	Oct 11, 2007	Lithuania	5–0	Kiwic 8', 34', Spahr 29', 64', 84'
Switzerland; Frauenfeld, Wil and Weinfelden	Oct 13, 2007	Cyprus	4–0	Jörg 18', Dzeladini 72', Heer 76', Ruchet 80'
Switzerland; Frauenfeld, Wil and Weinfelden	Oct 16, 2007	Wales	2–2	Kiwic 4', Spahr 8'
2008 UEFA Championship Second qualifying round – Group 3
Germany; Essen and Bottrop
Germany; Essen and Bottrop	Apr 10, 2008	Germany	0–4	
Germany; Essen and Bottrop	Apr 12, 2008	Sweden	1–1	Kiwic 20'
Germany; Essen and Bottrop	Apr 15, 2008	Poland	0–2	
2009 UEFA Championship First qualifying round – Group 8
Belarus; Minsk
Belarus; Minsk	Oct 18, 2008	Belarus	6–0	Canetta 27', Jörg 44', Lentejas 48', Baker 53', 61', Herzog 67'
Belarus; Minsk	Oct 20, 2008	Israel	3–0	Herzog 2', Lentejas 67', 80'
Belarus; Minsk	Oct 23, 2008	Scotland	2–0	Jörg 54', Wälti 56'
2009 UEFA Championship Second qualifying round – Group 3
Hungary; Sopron and Bük
Hungary; Sopron and Bük	Apr 9, 2009	Hungary	1–0	Canetta 51'
Hungary; Sopron and Bük	Apr 11, 2009	Russia	2–1	Canetta 3', 63'
Hungary; Sopron and Bük	Apr 14, 2009	Germany	0–6	
2010 UEFA Championship First qualifying round – Group 2
Switzerland; Muttenz
Switzerland; Muttenz	Oct 16, 2009	Georgia	23–0	Herzog 3', 27', 36', Fimian 9', 14', 20', 30' (pen.), 38', Schenkel 15', 32', Fässler 23', 37', Eichenberger 40', Mehr 43', 45', 53', Frey 46', 64', 66', Rutishauser 60', Gensetter 61', Fai 73', 80+2'
Switzerland; Muttenz	Oct 18, 2009	Faroe Islands	7–0	Herzog 26', Fässler 37', 70', 80+1', Fimian 46', Frey 60', 81'
Switzerland; Muttenz	Oct 21, 2009	Italy	2–1	Trajkovska 50', Schenkel 80+6'
2010 UEFA Championship Second qualifying round – Group 2
Spain; Madrid
Spain; Madrid	Apr 10, 2010	Belgium	0–0	
Spain; Madrid	Apr 12, 2010	Denmark	0–2	
Spain; Madrid	Apr 15, 2010	Spain	0–0	
2011 UEFA Championship First qualifying round – Group 9
Latvia; Salaspils and Ogre
Latvia; Salaspils and Ogre	Oct 14, 2010	Latvia	6–0	Sac 21', Rochaix 47', Fischer 55', Bernet 59', Ehrenbolger 70', Calo 78'
Latvia; Salaspils and Ogre	Oct 16, 2010	Estonia	6–0	Calo 6', 66', Heule 26', Wuichet 43', 76', Sac 51'
Latvia; Salaspils and Ogre	Oct 19, 2010	Poland	1–0	Nosalik 3' (o.g.)
2011 UEFA Championship Second qualifying round – Group 4
Switzerland; Küsnacht, Freienbach and Rapperswil-Jona
Switzerland; Küsnacht, Freienbach and Rapperswil-Jona	Apr 9, 2011	Wales	1–1	Brülhart 68'
Switzerland; Küsnacht, Freienbach and Rapperswil-Jona	Apr 11, 2011	France	0–2	
Switzerland; Küsnacht, Freienbach and Rapperswil-Jona	Apr 14, 2011	Scotland	0–3	
2012 UEFA Championship First qualifying round – Group 1
Poland; Biała Podlaska and Radzyń Podlaski
Poland; Biała Podlaska and Radzyń Podlaski	Okt 15, 2011	Georgia	17–1	Ribeaud 1', 43', 52', 64', 73', Stöckli 4', 28', Wuichet 6', 13', 20', 31', Pulver 8', 70', Sac 24', Guchmanidze 40' (o.g.), Deplazes 57', 62'
Poland; Biała Podlaska and Radzyń Podlaski	Oct 17, 2011	Latvia	15–0	Sac 6', 15', 33', Stöckli 13', 22', 61', 79', Ribeaud 18', 51', Wuichet 39', 49', 72', Pulver 53', Calo 74', 75'
Poland; Biała Podlaska and Radzyń Podlaski	Oct 20, 2011	Poland	2–1	Maritz 35', Pulver 62'
2012 UEFA Championship Second qualifying round – Group 1
Belgium; Harelbeke and Poperinge
Belgium; Harelbeke and Poperinge	Apr 13, 2012	Belgium	3–3	Pulver 6', Stöckli 80', Castignetti 80+2'
Belgium; Harelbeke and Poperinge	Apr 15, 2012	Iceland	1–0	Ribeaud 47'
Belgium; Harelbeke and Poperinge	Apr 18, 2012	England	1–0	Ribeaud 40'
2012 UEFA Championship
Switzerland; Nyon
Switzerland; Nyon	Jun 26, 2012	France	1–5	Pulver 13'
Switzerland; Nyon	Jun 29, 2012	Denmark	0–0 (4–5 pen.)	
2013 UEFA Championship First qualifying round – Group 1
Moldova; Orhei and Vadul lui Vodă
Moldova; Orhei and Vadul lui Vodă	Okt 19, 2012	Bulgaria	11–0	Calligaris 17', 32', 37', 58', 64' (pen.), Wyder 29', Müller 31', Vienne 39', Mauron 42', Rossire 49', 70'
Moldova; Orhei and Vadul lui Vodă	Okt 21, 2012	Moldova	8–0	Stierli 6', Calligaris 36', 51' (pen.), 53', Mauron 46', Schmoutz 48', 58', 80+2'
Moldova; Orhei and Vadul lui Vodă	Okt 24, 2012	Belgium	2–1	Calligaris 11', Stierli 36'
2013 UEFA Championship Second qualifying round – Group 4
Czech Republic; Slaný and Prague
Czech Republic; Slaný and Prague	Apr 9, 2013	Sweden	0–1	
Czech Republic; Slaný and Prague	Apr 11, 2013	Italy	2–1	Stierli 53', 66'
Czech Republic; Slaný and Prague	Apr 14, 2013	Czech Republic	0–2	
2014 UEFA Championship First qualifying round – Group 4
Bulgaria; Dobrich and Kavarna
Bulgaria; Dobrich and Kavarna	Jul 2, 2013	Bulgaria	6–0	Widmer 21', Germanier 27', Imhof 38', Fasel 42' (pen.), Geissbühler 44', Stierli 80+1'
Bulgaria; Dobrich and Kavarna	Jul 4, 2013	North Macedonia	12–0	Ameti 3', 80+2', Stierli 16', 32', Zehnder 28', Germanier 36', 49', Villiger 53', 75', Geissbühler 66', 72', Skerlevska 77' (o.g.)
Bulgaria; Dobrich and Kavarna	Jul 7, 2013	Italy	1–5	Ameti 13'
2014 UEFA Championship Second qualifying round – Group 6
Germany; Schweinfurt and Bamberg
Germany; Schweinfurt and Bamberg	Oct 11, 2013	Germany	0–6	
Germany; Schweinfurt and Bamberg	Oct 13, 2013	Belgium	1–1	Lucchini 74'
Germany; Schweinfurt and Bamberg	Oct 16, 2013	Netherlands	1–3	Stierli 48'
2015 UEFA Championship First qualifying round – Group 3
Bulgaria; Bük and Szombathely
Bulgaria; Bük and Szombathely	Oct 11, 2014	Azerbaijan	5–0	Mégroz 8', Surdez 11', 15', Schürch 36', Hoti 52'
Bulgaria; Bük and Szombathely	Oct 13, 2014	Portugal	2–1	Dubs 22', Surdez 80+1'
Bulgaria; Bük and Szombathely	Oct 16, 2014	Hungary	3–0	Felder 35', Jenzer 57', Dubs 80+1'
2015 UEFA Championship Second qualifying round – Group 1
Turkey; Adana
Turkey; Adana	Apr 11, 2015	Serbia	8–1	4', 10', 26', 51' Surdez, 47' Reuteler, 55' Stampfli, 78' Jenzer, 80+1' Lienhard 80+1'
Turkey; Adana	Apr 13, 2015	Turkey	4–0	7' Lienhard, 18' Surdez, 25' Mégroz, 44' Reuteler
Turkey; Adana	Apr 16, 2015	Finland	4–0	34' Reuteler, 47' (pen.) Mégroz, 53' Surdez, 61' Lehmann
2016 UEFA Championship First qualifying round – Group 9
Slovenia; Stara Pazova and Jakovo
Slovenia; Stara Pazova and Jakovo	Oct 16, 2015	Lithuania	6–1	Arfaoui 27', 30', Reuteler 38', 59', Lehmann 60', Haller 74'
Slovenia; Stara Pazova and Jakovo	Oct 18, 2015	Slovenia	0–1	
Slovenia; Stara Pazova and Jakovo	Oct 21, 2015	Serbia	3–0	Schegg 20', Haller 69', Lehmann 80+3'

== See also ==
- Switzerland women's national football team
- Switzerland women's national beach soccer team
