= Kadriye Gökçek =

Turkish football referee

- Other occupation: Civil servant

Domestic
Years	League	Role
1996-98	A2 Ligi	assistant referee
1999-2012	TFF Third League	referee
1998-2012	A2 Ligi	referee
2008-12	Turkish Women's First Football League	referee
2010-12	Turkish Regional Amateur League	referee

International
Years	League	Role
2009-12	UEFA Women's Under-19 Championship	referee
2010-12	UEFA Women's Under-17 Championship	referee

Kadriye Gökçek is a Turkish retired referee, and civil servant from profession. She was a FIFA listed woman referee since 2008.

== Early years ==
Gökçek's interest in football began through her elder brother. Six sisters used to watch all football matches with their elder brother, and listen to his comments. Inspired by the Turkish woman football referees Lale Orta and Hilal Tuba Tosun Ayer, she decided to become a football referee. As Kadriye attended a referee course, her two-years younger sister Dilan Deniz Gökçek also followed her footsteps. In the beginning, both sisters faced objection by their parents because this occupation is not coupled with social security. After completing her study in physical education at Gazi University in Ankara, she pursued a civil servant profession as a sports expert at the General Directorate of Youth and Sports, a subunit of the Ministry of Youth and Sports.

== Referee career ==
Kadriye Gökçek began her sport career as an assistant referee on August 10, 1996, in the A2 Ligi. After serving one and half years as an assistant referee in the TFF Third League, she qualified to supervise matches as referee in that league on January 17, 1999. Since then, she oversees in various levels of competitions.

In 2008, Gökçek qualified to bear the FIFA badge. She supervised matches in the Group 8 of the 2010 UEFA Women's U-19 Championship First qualifying round held in Hungary between September 19 and 24, 2009. She served as referee at the first round of the 2011 UEFA Women's U-17 Championship qualifying competition held from October 15 to 22, 2010 in Northern Ireland. At the 2012 UEFA Women's Under-17 Championship qualification, she officiated four games in total. The matches of Group 1 played in Poland, the game Switzerland against Georgia on October 15, 2011, and the match Poland against Switzerland on October 20, 2011, followed by the Group 3 matches held in Denmark, between Netherlands and Denmark on April 26, 2012, as well as between Finland and Netherlands on May 1, 2012. The final match of the 2012 World Deaf Football Championships played between the Russian and the American women's teams in Ankara, Turkey on July 18, 2012, was supervised by Kadriye Gökçek. In 2012, she oversaw the 2013 UEFA Women's U-19 Championship First qualifying round matches of Switzerland against Israel on October 20 and Netherlands against Israel on October 22 in Cham, Switzerland. In 2011 and 2012, she was one of the three woman referees with FIFA badge in Turkey along with her sister Dilan Deniz and Hilal Tuba Tosun Ayer.

On January 10, 2013, it was reported that Kadriye Gökçek retired from active referee career on her own will after serving 17-years long.
