= Manjou Wilde =

German footballer (born 1995)

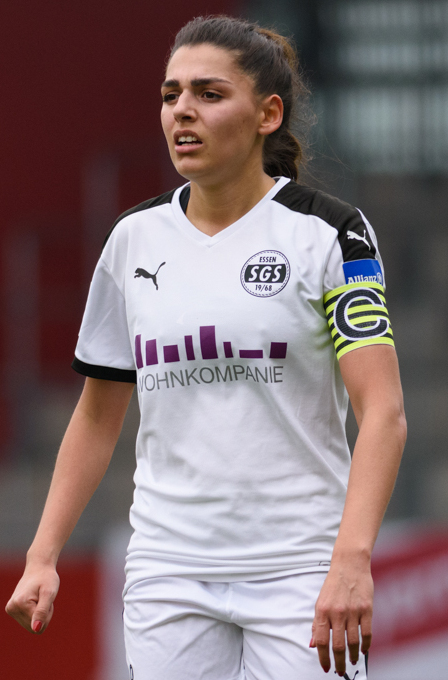
- Wilde with SGS Essen in 2019

Personal information
- Date of birth: 19 April 1995 (age 31)
- Place of birth: Bremen, Germany
- Height: 1.64 m (5 ft 5 in)
- Position: Midfielder

Team information
- Current team: Braga
- Number: 37

Senior career*
Years	Team	Apps	(Gls)
2012–2014	Werder Bremen		
2014–2015	SC Freiburg		
2016	Werder Bremen		
2016–2021	SGS Essen		
2021–2024	Köln		
2024–	Braga	9	(0)

International career
2012	Germany U17	1	(0)
2014	Germany U20	6	(0)
- * Club domestic league appearances and goals

Manjou Sabrina Wilde (German pronunciation: [manˈʒuː zaˈbʁiːna ˈvɪldə]; born 19 April 1995) is a German footballer who plays as a midfielder for Braga. She has represented Germany at the youth level internationally.

== Club career ==
Wilde has represented clubs Werder Bremen, SC Freiburg and SGS Essen. In 2021, she joined 1. FC Köln, and represented them until 2024.

== International career ==
Wilde was part of the Germany U17 squad which won the UEFA U17 Championship in 2012. Two years later she won the FIFA U-20 Women's World Cup in 2014.

== Personal life ==
Born in Germany, Wilde is of Indian descent from her father's side while her mother is German.

== Honours ==
Germany U20

- FIFA U-20 Women's World Cup: 2014

Germany U17

- UEFA U-17 European Championship: 2012
