= Šešlija =

Šešlija is a surname. Notable people with the surname include:

- Anđela Šešlija (born 1995), Bosnian footballer
- Milomir Šešlija (born 1964), Bosnian footballer
- Radoš Šešlija (born 1992), Serbian basketball player
