= 2017 Cyprus Women's Cup =

Tournament details
- Host country: Cyprus
- Dates: 1–8 March
- Teams: 12 (from 3 confederations)
- Venue(s): 5 (in 3 host cities)

Final positions
- Champions: Switzerland (1st title)
- Runners-up: South Korea
- Third place: North Korea
- Fourth place: Republic of Ireland

Tournament statistics
- Matches played: 24
- Goals scored: 65 (2.71 per match)

The 2017 Cyprus Women's Cup was the tenth edition of the Cyprus Women's Cup, an invitational women's football tournament held annually in Cyprus.

== Format ==
The tournament consisted of a group stage, held over three match days followed by a single day of classification matches to determine the final standings.

For the group stage, the twelve teams were split into three groups of four teams. Each group played a round-robin tournament with each team playing one match against each other team in its group.

== Venues ==
Stadium	City	Capacity
GSZ Stadium	Larnaca	13,032
Tasos Markos Stadium	Paralimni	5,800
Ammochostos Stadium	Larnaca	5,500
GSP Stadium	Nicosia	22,859
AEK Arena	Larnaca	7,400

== Teams ==
Team	FIFA Rankings (December 2016)
North Korea	10
Italy	16
Switzerland	17
South Korea	18
New Zealand	19
Scotland	21
Austria	24
Belgium	25
Czech Republic	33
Republic of Ireland	34
Wales	36
Hungary	40

== Group stage ==
=== Group A ===
Team	Pld	W	D	L	GF	GA	GD	Pts
Switzerland	3	2	1	0	9	2	+7	7
North Korea	3	2	0	1	7	2	+5	6
Belgium	3	1	1	1	7	7	0	4
Italy	3	0	0	3	1	13	−12	0

1 March 2017
14:30

North Korea	3–0	Italy
Kim Yun-mi 3'; Ri Kyong-hyang 48'; Ho Un-byol 50'	Report

GSZ Stadium
1 March 2017
17:30

Belgium	2–2	Switzerland
Mermans 31'; Cayman 78'	Report	Abbé 26'; Kuster 88'

GSZ Stadium
Referee: Barbara Poxhofer (Austria)

3 March 2017
14:30

Switzerland	1–0	North Korea
Kiwic 88'	Report

Ammochostos Stadium
3 March 2017
17:30

Italy	1–4	Belgium
Sabatino 9'	Report	Wullaert 10' (pen.); Van Wynendaele 39'; Coutereels 64'; Philtjens 81'

Ammochostos Stadium
Referee: Marta Huerta De Aza (Spain)

6 March 2017
14:30

Italy	0–6	Switzerland
	Report	Humm 6'; Reuteler 22', 50'; Wälti 32'; Crnogorčević 82', 84' (pen.)

Ammochostos Stadium
6 March 2017
14:30

North Korea	4–1	Belgium
Kim Nam-hui 7'; Ho Un-byol 30'; Wi Jong-sim 57'; Ri Kyong-hyang 71'	Report	Vanmechelen 62'

GSZ Stadium
Referee: Marte Sørø (Norway)

=== Group B ===
Team	Pld	W	D	L	GF	GA	GD	Pts
South Korea	3	2	1	0	4	0	+4	7
Scotland	3	2	0	1	6	5	+1	6
Austria	3	1	1	1	4	3	+1	4
New Zealand	3	0	0	3	2	8	−6	0

1 March 2017
14:30

New Zealand	2–3	Scotland
White 20'; Hearn 90+2'	Report	J. Ross 9'; Cuthbert 83'; Little 87'

Ammochostos Stadium
1 March 2017
17:30

South Korea	0–0	Austria
	Report

Ammochostos Stadium

3 March 2017
14:30

Austria	3–0	New Zealand
Billa 19'; Aschauer 53'; Eder 77'	Report

GSP Stadium
3 March 2017
17:30

Scotland	0–2	South Korea
	Report	Ji So-yun 48'; Cho So-hyun 74' (pen.)

GSP Stadium
Referee: Barbara Poxhofer (Austria)

6 March 2017
17:30

Austria	1–3	Scotland
Billa 65'	Report	J. Ross 58'; L. Ross 78'; Evans 90'

GSZ Stadium
6 March 2017
17:30

New Zealand	0–2	South Korea
	Report	Kang Yu-mi 50'; Ji So-yun 52'

Ammochostos Stadium

=== Group C ===
Team	Pld	W	D	L	GF	GA	GD	Pts
Republic of Ireland	3	2	1	0	3	0	+3	7
Wales	3	1	1	1	2	1	+1	4
Hungary	3	1	1	1	2	3	−1	4
Czech Republic	3	0	1	2	1	4	−3	1

1 March 2017
14:30

Czech Republic	0–2	Republic of Ireland
	Report	Roche 25'; O'Gorman 87'

Tasos Markos Stadium
1 March 2017
17:30

Hungary	0–2	Wales
	Report	Ward 34'; Estcourt 66'

Tasos Markos Stadium

3 March 2017
14:30

Wales	0–0	Czech Republic
	Report

Tasos Markos Stadium
3 March 2017
17:30

Republic of Ireland	0–0	Hungary
	Report

Tasos Markos Stadium

6 March 2017
14:30

Republic of Ireland	1–0	Wales
McCabe 20'	Report

Tasos Markos Stadium
6 March 2017
17:30

Czech Republic	1–2	Hungary
Martínková 86'	Report	Németh 27'; Zeller 88'

Tasos Markos Stadium

== Place matches stage ==
=== Eleventh place match ===
8 March 2017
11:00

Italy	6–2	Czech Republic
Girelli 38', 40'; Parisi 45'; Bonansea 49'; Gabbiadini 55'; Giugliano 90+3'	Report	Chlastáková 9'; Svitková 83' (pen.)

GSZ Stadium, Larnaca

=== Ninth place match ===
8 March 2017
11:00

New Zealand	3–1	Hungary
Pereira 36'; White 50', 90+3'	Report	Németh 25'

Tasos Markos Stadium, Paralimni

=== Seventh place match ===
8 March 2017
14:30

Belgium	1–1	Austria
Wullaert 63'	Report	Aschauer 78'
Penalties
	4–3

GSZ Stadium, Larnaca

=== Fifth place match ===
8 March 2017
14:30

Scotland	0–0	Wales
	Report
Penalties
J. Ross (penalty scored); Evans (penalty scored); Arnot (penalty scored); Crichton (penalty scored); Weir (penalty missed); Fi. Brown (penalty scored); Fr. Brown (penalty scored)	6–5	(penalty missed) Ladd; (penalty missed) Vine

Tasos Markos Stadium, Paralimni
Referee: Eszter Urban (Hungary)

=== Third place match ===
8 March 2017
14:30

North Korea	2–0	Republic of Ireland
Wi Jong-sim 73'; Kim Ryu-song 85'	Report

AEK Arena, Larnaca

=== Final ===
8 March 2017
18:30

Switzerland	1–0	South Korea
Dickenmann 58'	Report

AEK Arena, Larnaca
Referee: Marta Huerta de Aza (Spain)

== Final standings ==
Rank	Team
1st place, gold medalist(s)	Switzerland
2nd place, silver medalist(s)	South Korea
3rd place, bronze medalist(s)	North Korea
4	Republic of Ireland
5	Scotland
6	Wales
7	Belgium
8	Austria
9	New Zealand
10	Hungary
11	Italy
12	Czech Republic
