= Marion Romanelli =

French football player (born 1996)

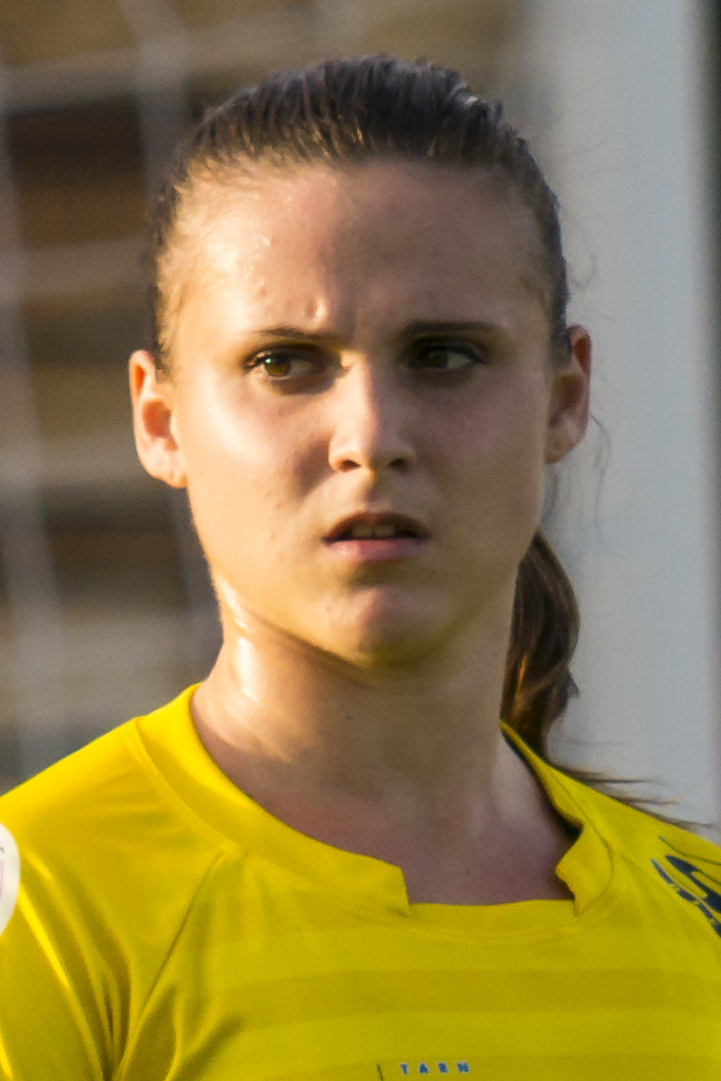

Personal information
- Date of birth: 24 July 1996 (age 30)
- Place of birth: Aix-en-Provence, France
- Height: 1.62 m (5 ft 4 in)
- Position: Defender

Youth career
- 2002–2004: FC Lambescain
- 2004–2005: US Pélican
- 2005–2011: Luynes S

Senior career*
Years	Team	Apps	(Gls)
2011–2014	FCF Monteux	57	(8)
2014–2015	ASPTT Albi	20	(1)
2015–2020	Montpellier HSC	38	(0)

International career^{‡}
2011–2013	France U17	19	(1)
2013–2015	France U19	11	(0)
- * Club domestic league appearances and goals as of 22 April 2019 ‡ National team caps and goals as of 7 July 2015

Marion Romanelli (born 24 July 1996) is a French football player.

== Honours ==
=== International ===
- France U17
  - FIFA U-17 Women's World Cup winner in Azerbaijan, 2012
  - UEFA Women's Under-17 Championship runner-up in Switzerland, 2012
