= Ieva Kibirkštis =

Canadian-Lithuanian footballer and manager

Ieva Cederström (Kibirkštis)
Personal information
- Full name: Ieva Melanija Cederström (Kibirkštis)
- Date of birth: 2 April 1991 (age 35)
- Place of birth: Pointe-Claire, Quebec, Canada
- Height: 1.70 m (5 ft 7 in)
- Position: Defender

Youth career
- 2004–2008: ESDS Jaguars
- 2005–2008: Lakers du Lac Saint-Louis

College career
Years	Team	Apps	(Gls)
2008–2011	Mount St. Mary's Mountaineers	44	(1)

Senior career*
Years	Team	Apps	(Gls)
2013	Jyväskylän Pallokerho		
2013-2015	SV Eintracht Leipzig-Süd		

International career^{‡}
2007	Lithuania U17	4	(2)
2008	Lithuania U19	3	(1)
2011–2013	Lithuania	6	(0)

Managerial career
- 2013–2014: SV Eintracht Leipzig-Süd (women)
- 2015–2017: Kristianstads DFF (women)
- 2018: Lithuania U17 (women)
- 2019–2020: Hittarps IK (women)
- 2021: FC Rosengård B (women)
- 2021-2024: FC Rosengård (women)
- * Club domestic league appearances and goals ‡ National team caps and goals as of 9 April 2013

Ieva Cederström (Kibirkštis) (born 2 April 1991) is a football manager and a former player who played as a defender. Born in Canada, she played for the Lithuania women's national team.

== Early life ==
Ieva was raised in Pointe-Claire, Quebec.
