= Pauline Cousin =

French footballer (born 1995)

Personal information
- Date of birth: 4 February 1995 (age 31)
- Place of birth: Dunkirk, France
- Height: 1.60 m (5 ft 3 in)
- Position: Forward

Team information
- Current team: Orléans
- Number: 19

Youth career
- 2001–2010: US Saint-Omer
- 2010–2011: Hénin-Beaumont

Senior career*
Years	Team	Apps	(Gls)
2011–2014	Hénin-Beaumont	53	(28)
2014–2017	Marseille	58	(18)
2017–2018	Dijon	21	(2)
2018–2023	Lens	79	(24)
2023–	Orléans	33	(7)

International career
2011–2012	France U17	15	(9)
2013	France U19	2	(1)
Medal record
Women's football
Representing France
FIFA U-17 Women's World Cup
Winner	2012 Azerbaijan
UEFA Women's Under-17 Championship
Runner-up	2012 Switzerland
- * Club domestic league appearances and goals as of 20 April 2025

Pauline Cousin (born 4 February 1995) is a French footballer who plays as a forward for Seconde Ligue club Orléans.
