= Maja Hagemann =

Danish footballer (born 2005)

Personal information
- Full name: Maja Merete Hagemann
- Date of birth: 7 October 2005 (age 21)
- Place of birth: Denmark
- Position: Midfielder

Team information
- Current team: Sassuolo
- Number: 14

Youth career
- 2020: HSK Football

Senior career*
Years	Team	Apps	(Gls)
2021–2023	Fortuna Hjørring	2	(0)
2023–2024	HB Køge	8	(0)
2024–	Sassuolo	14	(0)

International career^{‡}
2021	Denmark U16	3	(0)
2021–2022	Denmark U17	10	(1)
2023–2024	Denmark U19	12	(0)
2025–	Denmark U23	7	(0)
- * Club domestic league appearances and goals as of 30 March 2025 ‡ National team caps and goals as of 16 April 2026

Maja Merete Hagemann (born 7 October 2005) is a Danish professional footballer who plays as a midfielder for Serie A club Sassuolo. She previously played for Fortuna Hjørring.

Hagemann has represented Denmark at youth level.
