= Camille Surdez =

Swiss footballer (born 1998)

Personal information
- Date of birth: 13 January 1998 (age 28)
- Place of birth: Muriaux, Switzerland
- Position: Forward

Youth career
- 2006-2008: FC Dombresson
- 2008-2012: FC Serrières
- 2012-2014: Neuchâtel Xamax

Senior career*
Years	Team	Apps	(Gls)
2014–2017	Yverdon	14	(3)
2017–2018	YB Frauen	16	(4)
2018	Yverdon	6	(0)
2018–2020	Bordeaux	12	(0)
2020–2022	Basel	31	(17)

International career^{‡}
2013–2015	Switzerland U17	9	(9)
2016–2017	Switzerland U19	10	(6)
2019–2022	Switzerland	3	(0)
- * Club domestic league appearances and goals as of 31 July 2023 ‡ National team caps and goals as of 31 July 2023

Camille Surdez (born 13 January 1998) is a Swiss former footballer who played as a forward for the Switzerland national team.

== Club career ==
Surdez started football at the age of 8 at FC Dombresson, in a boys' team. She then joined the juniors of FC Serrières, then FC Yverdon, with whom she made her debut in the National League A. She then joined BSC Young Boys.

In July 2018, Surdez signed up for two years at the Girondins de Bordeaux.

== International ==
In 2016, Surdez was part of the Swiss semi-finalist team for 2016 U19 European Championship.
