= Sarah Dyrehauge Hansen =

Danish footballer

Sarah Dyrehauge
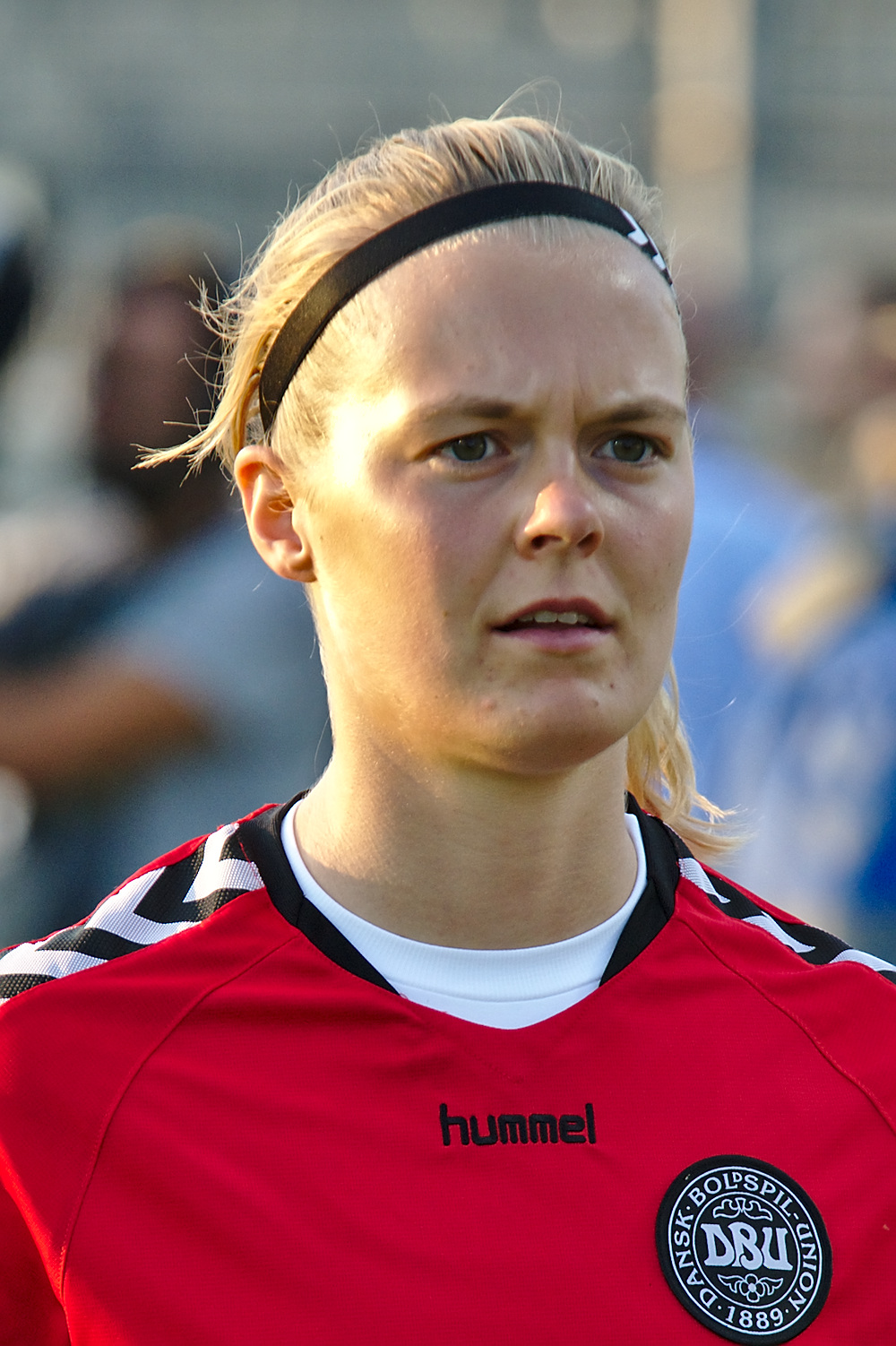
- Sarah Dyrehauge Hansen in July 2017

Personal information
- Full name: Sarah Dyrehauge Hansen
- Date of birth: 14 September 1996 (age 30)
- Place of birth: Denmark
- Position: Midfielder

Team information
- Current team: Fortuna Hjørring
- Number: 9

Youth career
- Vinding FF

Senior career*
Years	Team	Apps	(Gls)
2013	Vejle B	19	
2013	Skovbakken		
2014–2015	KoldingQ		
2015–2019	Fortuna Hjørring	13	(4)
2019–2021	FC Thy-Thisted Q	29	(11)
2021	Rosenborg	10	(0)
2022	Kolbotn		
2023–2025	AGF		
2025–	Fortuna Hjørring		

International career^{‡}
2011	Denmark U16	6	(3)
2011–2013	Denmark U17	22	(15)
2013–2015	Denmark U19	28	(11)
2016–2017	Denmark U23	2	(2)
2016–2017	Denmark	9	(2)
Medal record
Women's football
Representing Denmark
UEFA Women's Championship
Silver medal – second place	2017 Netherlands	Team
- * Club domestic league appearances and goals ‡ National team caps and goals as of 18:42, 31 August 2026 (UTC)

Sarah Dyrehauge Hansen (born 14 September 1996) is a Danish footballer who plays as a midfielder for A-Liga club Fortuna Hjørring and for the Denmark national team.

== Club career ==
Dyrehauge started her senior career at 15 years old in 2011 with A-Liga club Vejle B, coming on in the match against IK Skovbakken. Vejle withdrew from the league following the 2012–13 season and she signed with top-flight side IK Skovbakken.In 2014 she joined KoldingQ mid-season, where she played until 2015. Dyrehauge signed with Fortuna Hjørring where she played for four seasons from 2015 to 2019. With Fortuna, she won the Danish league and cup in the 2015–16 season.

== International career ==
Dyrehauge played for several Danish Youth Teams. First joining the U16 team in 2011 and in the same year debuting for the U17, where she became an important part of the team, playing important competitions, including the 2012 UEFA Under-17 European Championship, when Denmark finished third. On 29 July 2013, she debuted for the U-19 team in a friendly match against Norway. Dyrehauge also played a pivotal role in this team, being part of the squad that represented Denmark at the 2013 UEFA European Under-19 Championship elite qualification, 2014 UEFA European Under-19 Championship elite round and 2015 UEFA European Under-19 Championship qualification.

On 22 January 2016, Dyrehauge debuted for the Danish Senior Team in a friendly match against Netherlands. In the same year, she was part of the squad that played the 2016 Algarve Cup. She also represented Denmark at the 2017 Algarve Cup. While, still with the senior team, she played once for the Denmark U23 team in a match against Finland. In 2017, she was part of the group that represented Denmark at the UEFA European Championship 2017.
