= Eleni Peletidou =

Greek footballer

Personal information
- Date of birth: 28 June 1980 (age 46)
- Position: Goalkeeper

Team information
- Current team: Greece U19 and U17 (goalkeeping coach)

Senior career*
Years	Team	Apps	(Gls)
1994–2001	PAOK Kozanis		
2001–2008	PAOK		
2011–2014	Odysseas Glyfadas		
2014–2018	PAOK		
2018–2019	Odysseas Glyfadas		

International career^{‡}
1997–2018	Greece		

Managerial career
- 2019–2020: Greece (goalkeeping coach)
- 2019–: Greece U19 (goalkeeping coach)
- 2019–: Greece U17 (goalkeeping coach)
- 2020–2021: Iraklis Psachna (goalkeeping coach)
- * Club domestic league appearances and goals as of 23 June 2023 ‡ National team caps and goals as of 19:38, 30 August 2019 (UTC)

Eleni Peletidou (Greek: Ελένη Πελετίδου; born 28 June 1980) is a Greek footballer who plays as a goalkeeper and has appeared for the Greece women's national team.

== Career ==
Peletidou has been capped for the Greece national team, appearing for the team during the 2019 FIFA Women's World Cup qualifying cycle.
