= Géraldine Reuteler =

Swiss footballer (born 1999)

- Reuteler in 2026

Personal information
- Full name: Géraldine Joséphine Reuteler
- Date of birth: 21 April 1999 (age 27)
- Place of birth: Nidwalden, Switzerland
- Height: 1.64 m (5 ft 5 in)
- Position: Midfielder

Team information
- Current team: Arsenal
- Number: 14

Senior career*
Years	Team	Apps	(Gls)
2014–2018	Luzern	43	(28)
2018–2026	Eintracht Frankfurt	146	(40)
2026–	Arsenal	3	(0)

International career^{‡}
2015–2016	Switzerland U17	20	(13)
2016–2018	Switzerland U19	14	(4)
2017–	Switzerland	93	(19)
- * Club domestic league appearances and goals as of 1 November 2026 ‡ National team caps and goals as of 14 October 2026

Géraldine Joséphine Reuteler (born 21 April 1999) is a Swiss professional footballer who plays for Women's Super League club Arsenal and the Switzerland national team. She has previously played for Swiss Women's Super League club FC Luzern and German Frauen-Bundesliga club Eintracht Frankfurt.

== Club career ==
Reuteler started her career in 2008 at FC Stans before moving to FC Luzern in February 2014. In Lucerne, after just four months, she was promoted to the first team in the summer of 2014 and made her Nationalliga A debut at the age of just 15 in a 1–0 win over FC Zürich on 30 August that year. She made 43 league appearances and scored 28 goals in four years.

On 21 March 2018, Reuteler signed a two-year contract with 1. FFC Frankfurt. In July 2020, 1. FFC Frankfurt merged with the men's football club Eintracht Frankfurt and thus formed that club's women's football department. In early 2022, she extended her contract with Eintracht Frankfurt until June 2024. At the end of March 2021, Reuteler suffered a cruciate ligament rupture and missed almost a year of action. On 13 February 2024, Reuteler extended her contract once more by two years to remain at Frankfurt until June 2026. In the 2024–25 season, Reuteler scored ten league goals for the first time in the Frauen-Bundesliga and helped Eintracht to a third-place finish. She went on to record 53 goals and 45 assists in 183 matches across all competitions before departing from Frankfurt in the summer of 2026.

On 8 July 2026, it was announced that Reuteler had joined Women's Super League side Arsenal.

== International career ==
Reuteler completed the 2015 European Championship for Switzerland's U-17s and reached the final. In June 2016 followed the European Championship semi-finals with the U-19s of Switzerland, which, however, lost to France. In 2017, Reuteler received her first call-up to the Swiss senior team and made her debut on 10 June 2017 when she came on as a 60th-minute substitute for Martina Moser against England. She played for Switzerland at Euro 2017 and was the youngest player in the squad.

Reuteler took part in the Cyprus Cup for Switzerland in the spring of 2018. In July 2018, she took part in the U-19 European Championship in Switzerland. Reuteler scored two goals at the tournament, but the Swiss team was eliminated after the preliminary round.

Reuteler took part in Euro 2022 and was in the starting line-up for all three of the Swiss' group games. In the decisive third game against the Netherlands, she scored a 53rd-minute equaliser but Switzerland eventually lost 4–1 and were eliminated in the group stages.

Reuteler established herself as a key player for her national team and her strong performances saw her win the Swiss Women's Player of the Year award for 2024.

On 23 June 2025, Reuteler was called up to the Swiss squad for the UEFA Women's Euro 2025, which was held in Switzerland. She was one of the host nation's best performers at the tournament, scoring in a 2–0 win over Iceland and assisting Riola Xhemaili's dramatic equalising goal against Finland which sent Switzerland through to the quarter-finals of a Euros for the very first time. They lost 2–0 to world champions and eventual finalists Spain in the quarter-final. As of December 2025, Reuteler is her country's sixth all-time top scorer.

== Personal life ==
Reuteler learned at the Talents School FREI'S schools and graduated there in 2018 as a businesswoman.

== Career statistics ==
=== International ===
As of match played 13 October 2026

Appearances and goals by national team and year
National team	Year	Apps	Goals
Switzerland	2017	11	3
Switzerland	2018	10	1
Switzerland	2019	10	3
Switzerland	2020	6	0
Switzerland	2021	2	0
Switzerland	2022	10	5
Switzerland	2023	16	0
Switzerland	2024	8	1
Switzerland	2025	12	3
Switzerland	2026	8	3
Total		93	19

Scores and results list Switzerland's goal tally first, score column indicates score after each Reuteler goal.

List of international goals scored by Géraldine Reuteler
No.	Date	Venue	Opponent	Score	Result	Competition
1	6 March 2017	Ammochostos Stadium, Larnaca, Cyprus	Italy	2–0	6–0	2017 Cyprus Women's Cup
2	6 March 2017	Ammochostos Stadium, Larnaca, Cyprus	Italy	4–0	6–0	2017 Cyprus Women's Cup
3	24 November 2017	Wefox Arena Schaffhausen, Schaffhausen, Switzerland	Belarus	3–0	3–0	2019 FIFA Women's World Cup qualification
4	9 October 2018	Tissot Arena, Biel/Bienne, Switzerland	Belgium	1–0	1–1	2019 FIFA Women's World Cup qualification – UEFA play-offs
5	9 April 2019	Stadion Schützenwiese, Winterthur, Switzerland	Slovakia	1–0	1–0	Friendly
6	29 May 2019	Stadio Paolo Mazza, Ferrara, Italy	Italy	1–2	1–3	Friendly
7	8 October 2019	Stockhorn Arena, Thun, Switzerland	Croatia	2–0	2–0	UEFA Women's Euro 2022 qualifying
8	17 July 2022	Bramall Lane, Sheffield, England	Netherlands	1–1	1–4	UEFA Women's Euro 2022
9	6 September 2022	Stade de la Tuilière, Lausanne, Switzerland	Moldova	7–0	15–0	2023 FIFA Women's World Cup qualification
10	6 September 2022	Stade de la Tuilière, Lausanne, Switzerland	Moldova	8–0	15–0	2023 FIFA Women's World Cup qualification
11	6 September 2022	Stade de la Tuilière, Lausanne, Switzerland	Moldova	15–0	15–0	2023 FIFA Women's World Cup qualification
12	11 November 2022	Wefox Arena Schaffhausen, Schaffhausen, Switzerland	Denmark	1–0	1–2	Friendly
13	25 October 2024	Letzigrund, Zürich, Switzerland	Australia	1–1	1–1	Friendly
14	8 April 2025	Valbjarnarvöllur/Thróttarvöllur, Reykjavík, Iceland	Iceland	1–0	3–3	2025 UEFA Women's Nations League
15	26 June 2025	Stadion Schützenwiese, Winterthur, Switzerland	Czech Republic	2–1	4–1	Friendly
16	6 July 2025	Stadion Wankdorf, Bern, Switzerland	Iceland	1–0	2–0	UEFA Women's Euro 2025
17	5 June 2026	Cornaredo Stadium, Lugano, Switzerland	Malta	6–1	6–1	2027 FIFA Women's World Cup qualification
18	9 June 2026	Mourneview Park, Lurgan, Northern Ireland	Northern Ireland	1–0	2–1	2027 FIFA Women's World Cup qualification
19	9 October 2026	Mezőkövesdi Városi Stadion, Mezőkövesd, Hungary	Israel	1–0	7–3	2027 FIFA Women's World Cup qualification play-offs

== Honours ==
Individual

- Swiss Women's Player of the Year: 2024
