= 2012 UEFA Women's Under-17 Championship =

Tournament details
- Host country: Switzerland
- Dates: 26–29 June
- Teams: 4

Final positions
- Champions: Germany (3rd title)
- Runners-up: France
- Third place: Denmark
- Fourth place: Switzerland

The 2012 UEFA Women's Under-17 Championship was the fifth edition of the UEFA Women's Under-17 Championship. The tournament serves as a qualifier to the 2012 FIFA U-17 Women's World Cup. The first qualifying matches were played on 29 September 2011, the final was played on 29 June 2012.

With 42 participating nations a new U-17 record was set.

== Qualification ==
	Teams entering in this round	Teams advancing from previous round	Competition format
First qualifying round (40 teams)	40 teams from associations ranked 3–43		10 groups of 4 teams, hosted by one country, seeded into four pots by UEFA coefficient
Second qualifying round (16 teams)	Germany (ranked 1); Netherlands (ranked 2)	10 group winners from 1st qualifying round; 4 best group runners-up from 1st qualifying round	4 groups of 4 teams, hosted by one country, seeded into four pots by UEFA coefficient
Final tournament (4 teams)		4 group winners from 2nd qualifying round	Semifinals, Final

== Final round ==
2012 UEFA Women's Under-17 Championship teams and final round performance

The four qualifying group winners played the knockout stage in the Centre sportif de Colovray Nyon, Switzerland from 26 to 29 June 2012. There were two semifinals, a third place match and the final. The third place match as well as the final were decided by penalties. No extra time was played.

Semi-finals
26 June 2012
Switzerland	1
France	5
26 June 2012
Denmark	0
Germany	2

Final
29 June 2012
France	1 (3)
Germany	1 (4)
Third place
29 June 2012
Switzerland	0 (4)
Denmark	0 (5)

=== Semi-finals ===
26 June 2012
11:00 CET

Switzerland	1–5	France
Pulver 13'	Report	Toletti 14'; Blanchard 19'; Cousin 40'; Diani 52'; Karchouni 80+4' (pen.)

Centre sportif de Colovray Nyon, Nyon
Referee: Marte Sørø (Norway)

26 June 2012
15:00 CET

Denmark	0–2	Germany
	Report	Bremer 71'; Däbritz 80+3'

Centre sportif de Colovray Nyon, Nyon
Referee: Amy Rayner (England)

=== Third place match ===
29 June 2012
11:00 CET

Switzerland	0–0	Denmark
	Report
Penalties
Bruderer (penalty scored); Wuichet (penalty scored); Ribeaud (penalty scored); Vienne (penalty missed); Calo (penalty missed); Deplazes (penalty scored); Studer (penalty missed)	4–5	(penalty scored) Hansen; (penalty scored) Beck; (penalty missed) Poulsen; (penalty missed) Thestrup; (penalty scored) Kildemoes; (penalty scored) Christiansen; (penalty scored) Nederby

Centre sportif de Colovray Nyon, Nyon
Referee: Marte Sørø (Norway)

=== Final ===
29 June 2012
15:00 CET

France	1–1	Germany
Diani 57'	Report	Bremer 67'
Penalties
Toletti (penalty scored); Saulnier (penalty scored); Gherbi (penalty scored); Froment (penalty missed); Karchouni (penalty missed)	3–4	(penalty missed) Däbritz; (penalty scored) Beil; (penalty scored) Panfil; (penalty scored) Streng; (penalty scored) Lückel

Centre sportif de Colovray Nyon, Nyon
Referee: Amy Rayner (England)

2012 UEFA Women's Under-17 European champions

Germany
Third title
