= Jana Spengler =

German footballer (born 1995)

Personal information
- Date of birth: 30 January 1995 (age 31)
- Place of birth: Germany
- Height: 1.76 m (5 ft 9 in)
- Position: Forward

Team information
- Current team: VfB Stuttgart
- Number: 18

Youth career
- 2003–2012: VfL Sindelfingen
- 2013–2015: South Florida Bulls

Senior career*
Years	Team	Apps	(Gls)
2011–2013	VfL Sindelfingen	17	(3)
2017–2022	VfL Sindelfingen	58	(20)
2022–2023	VfL Herrenberg	23	(8)
2023–	VfB Stuttgart	25	(13)

International career^{‡}
2010	Germany U-15	1	(0)
2011	Germany U-16	1	(0)
2011–2012	Germany U-17	5	(2)
- * Club domestic league appearances and goals as of 20 October 2024 ‡ National team caps and goals as of 3 July 2025

Jana Spengler (born 30 January 1995) is a German footballer who plays as a forward for VfB Stuttgart.

== Club career ==
Spengler began her career at VfL Sindelfingen, aged eight. She went through all junior divisions, reaching the finals of the German U-17 championship and scoring both goals in a 2-3 loss to Turbine Potsdam.

Her maiden first-team appearance came on 4 December 2011 in a 2. Bundesliga fixture versus ETSV Würzburg. Sindelfingen won the title that year and got promoted to the Bundesliga, as Spengler played five matches despite being plagued by injuries. During the 2012–13 Bundesliga season Spengler scored her first Bundesliga goal in a win against Freiburg. Spengler left Sindelfingen in the summer of 2013 to join South Florida Bulls, the college team of University of South Florida.

She returned to Sindelfingen in 2017. Her next move came in 2022, when she joined VfL Herrenberg. A season later, Spengler transferred to VfB Stuttgart. She scored 12 goals in her first season, the second-most alongside Mandy Islacker and behind Jana Beuschlein (21 goals), helping Stuttgart to take the Oberliga Württemberg title. She also extended her contract until 2026. In 2024–25, Stuttgart continued its run through the divisions, winning the Regionalliga Süd.
