= Paiania (training ground) =

Paiania Athletic Centre "Yiorgos Vardinogiannis"
- Interactive map of Paiania Athletic Centre "Yiorgos Vardinogiannis"
- Address: Paiania, East Attica , Greece
- Location: Pellinis & Karelas Avenue, Paiania, Attica
- Coordinates: 37°56′05″N 23°51′26″E
- Owner: Vardinogiannis family (1981-2025); Hellenic Football Federation (2025-present)
- Operator: Hellenic Football Federation
- Type: Training Ground
- Public transit: 1st Bus Stop Karelas, close to Defunct Railway Station Karelas

Construction
- Opened: 1981

Tenants
- Panathinaikos F.C. (1981-2024); Greek National Football Teams (2025-present)

The Paiania Athletic Centre "Yiorgos Vardinogiannis" is a football training ground and the new training center of the Greece national football team. The training center houses The Greek national team as well as the youth and women's teams. It is dubbed the "Home of the National Teams."

It was officially opened on June 19, 1981.

Located in the Athenian municipality of Paiania, the facility covers 70 acres and has historically been owned by the Vardinogiannis family. I March 2025, they sold it for €21.5 million to the Hellenic Football Federation.

The previous owner was businessman Yiorgos Vardinogiannis, hence its namesake.

The Greek national team began using the ground in September 2025 for their 2026 FIFA World Cup qualifying campaign.

== Facilities ==
- Hotel accommodations which consist of 27 double rooms, restaurant, bar, TV room, indoor pool, sauna, recreation hall, play rooms, storage areas and conference room;
- three floodlit football fields with natural grass turf;
- three floodlit football fields with artificial turf for special preparation;
- a fully equipped gymnasium with medical facilities, physiotherapy room, and dressing rooms for the professional team and the academy;
- office space.

Following the purchase of the training center, the Hellenic Football Federation decided to extensively renovate the facility, which is estimated to cost €3 million.
