= Lola Wajnblum =

Belgian footballer

Personal information
- Full name: Lola Wajnblum
- Date of birth: 22 January 1996 (age 30)
- Place of birth: Belgium
- Height: 1.61 m (5 ft 3 in)
- Position: Forward

Team information
- Current team: Standard Liège
- Number: 7

Senior career*
Years	Team	Apps	(Gls)
2012–2013	Standard Liège	19	(4)
2013–2017	Anderlecht	42	(3)
2018–2022	Standard Liège	12	(4)
2021–2022	OH Leuven	16	(2)
2022–2024	Anderlecht		
2024–	Standard Liège		

International career^{‡}
2019–	Belgium	8	(0)
- * Club domestic league appearances and goals as of 20 August 2022 (UTC) ‡ National team caps and goals as of 8 November 2021

Lola Wajnblum (born 22 January 1996) is a Belgian footballer who plays as a forward and has appeared for the Belgium women's national team.

== Career ==
Wajnblum has been capped for the Belgium national team, appearing for the team during the 2019 FIFA Women's World Cup qualifying cycle.
