= Lithuania women's national under-17 football team =

Lithuania Women's U-17
- Association: Lithuanian Football Federation
- Confederation: UEFA (Europe)
- Head coach: (Lithuania) Ieva Kibirkštis (2018)
- Captain: Gintarė Blažytė (2018)
- FIFA code: LTU
First colours	Second colours

Biggest win
- Lithuania 3–0 Moldova (Chișinău, Moldova; 28 October 2008)

Biggest defeat
- Czech Republic 18–0 Lithuania (Marijampolė, Lithuania; 9 October 2009)

UEFA Women's Under-17 Championship
- Appearances: 1 (first in 2018)
- Best result: Group stage (2018)

The Lithuania women's national under-17 football team is the national under-17 football team of Lithuania and is governed by the Lithuanian Football Federation.

Lithuania women's national under-17 football team is set to compete in 2018 UEFA Women's Under-17 Championship which will be held in Lithuania.

== FIFA Women's Under-17 World Cup ==
Year	Result	GP	W	D	L	GF	GA
(New Zealand) 2008	did not qualify						
(Trinidad and Tobago) 2010	did not qualify						
(Azerbaijan) 2012	did not qualify						
(Costa Rica) 2014	did not qualify						
(Jordan) 2016	did not qualify						
(Uruguay) 2018	did not qualify						
(India) 2022	did not qualify						
(Dominican Republic) 2024	did not qualify						
(Morocco) 2025	did not qualify						
Total	0/9	0	0	0	0	0	0

== UEFA Women's Under-17 Championship ==
Year	Result	GP	W	D	L	GF	GA
(Switzerland) 2008	did not qualify						
(Switzerland) 2009	did not qualify						
(Switzerland) 2010	did not qualify						
(Switzerland) 2011	did not qualify						
(Switzerland) 2012	did not qualify						
(Switzerland) 2013	did not qualify						
(England) 2014	did not qualify						
(Iceland) 2015	did not qualify						
(Belarus) 2016	did not qualify						
(Czech Republic) 2017	did not qualify						
(Lithuania) 2018	Group Stage	3	0	0	3	0	21
(Bulgaria) 2019	did not qualify						
(Sweden) ~~2020~~	Cancelled						
(Faroe Islands) ~~2021~~	Cancelled						
(Bosnia and Herzegovina) 2022	did not qualify						
(Estonia) 2023	did not qualify						
(Sweden) 2024	did not qualify						
(Faroe Islands) 2025	did not qualify						
(Northern Ireland) 2026	did not qualify						
(Finland) 2027	to be determined						
(Belgium) 2028	to be determined						
(Turkey) 2029	to be determined						
Total	1/16	3	0	0	3	0	21

== See also ==
- Lithuania women's national football team
