= Chloé Froment =

French association footballer (born 1995)

Personal information
- Date of birth: 30 July 1995 (age 31)
- Place of birth: Lyon, France
- Height: 1.70 m (5 ft 7 in)
- Position: Defender

Team information
- Current team: Grenoble
- Number: 29

College career
Years	Team	Apps	(Gls)
2016–2018	Long Beach State	60	(0)

Senior career*
Years	Team	Apps	(Gls)
2019	Fylkir	2	(0)
2020–	Grenoble	20	(0)

International career
2011	France U16	4	(0)
2011–2012	France U17	6	(0)
2012	France U19	2	(0)
- * Club domestic league appearances and goals

Chloé Froment (born 30 July 1995) is a French defender who plays for Grenoble.

Froment signed with Icelandic side Fylkir in February 2019. However, she suffered a season-ending knee injury in just her second appearance with the team.
