= Jessica Foy =

Northern Irish footballer

Personal information
- Date of birth: 7 June 1995 (age 31)
- Place of birth: Northern Ireland,
- Position: Forward

Team information
- Current team: Glentoran
- Number: 3

International career^{‡}
Years	Team	Apps	(Gls)
- Northern Ireland
- ‡ National team caps and goals as of 19:46, 30 August 2019 (UTC)

Jessica Foy (born 7 June 1995) is a Northern Irish footballer who plays as a forward and has appeared for the Northern Ireland women's national team.

== Career ==
Foy has been capped for the Northern Ireland national team, appearing for the team during the 2019 FIFA Women's World Cup qualifying cycle.
