= Kristina Pantelić =

Serbian footballer (born 1997)

Personal information
- Date of birth: 9 October 1997 (age 29)
- Place of birth: Valjevo, Serbia, FR Yugoslavia
- Height: 1.65 m (5 ft 5 in)
- Position: Midfielder

Team information
- Current team: Saint-Étienne
- Number: 8

Senior career*
Years	Team	Apps	(Gls)
- Crvena zvezda
2015–2018	ASPTT Albi	40	(0)
2018–2019	Vendenheim	20	(1)
2019–	Saint-Étienne	5	(0)

International career^{‡}
2012–2013	Serbia U17	9	(3)
2014–2015	Serbia U19	11	(4)
2017–	Serbia	8	(0)
- * Club domestic league appearances and goals as of 04:20, 13 February 2021 (UTC) ‡ National team caps and goals as of 12 April 2022

Kristina Pantelić (Serbian Cyrillic: Кристина Пантелић; born 9 October 1997) is a Serbian footballer who plays as a midfielder for French club Saint-Étienne and the Serbia national team.

== International career ==
Pantelić has been capped for the Serbia national team, appearing for the team during the 2019 FIFA Women's World Cup qualifying cycle.
