= Victoria Țurcanu =

Moldovan footballer

Personal information
- Birth name: Victoria Gurdiş
- Date of birth: 22 February 1996 (age 30)
- Positions: Defender; goalkeeper

Senior career*
Years	Team	Apps	(Gls)
- Goliador Chișinău
- ARF Criuleni

International career^{‡}
2011	Moldova U17	3	(1)
2012–2014	Moldova U19	9	(0)
2015–	Moldova	7	(0)
- * Club domestic league appearances and goals ‡ National team caps and goals as of 7 March 2020

Victoria Țurcanu (née Gurdiş; born 22 February 1996) is a Moldovan footballer who plays as a defender for the Moldova women's national team.
