= Linda Hallin =

Swedish footballer

Personal information
- Full name: Linda Hallin
- Date of birth: March 14, 1996 (age 30)
- Place of birth: Sweden
- Position: Midfielder

Youth career
- 2002–2009: IFK Kumla
- 2009–2011: KIF Örebro DFF

Senior career*
Years	Team	Apps	(Gls)
2012–2017	KIF Örebro DFF	55	(3)
2018	Hammarby IF	4	(0)
2019	Sköllersta IF		
2020–2023	AIK	65	(5)
2024	Eskilstuna United	3	(0)

International career^{‡}
2012	Sweden U17	6	(7)
2014	Sweden U19	6	(1)
- * Club domestic league appearances and goals as of 6 May 2024 ‡ National team caps and goals as of 09:51, 21 May 2016 (UTC)

Linda Hallin (born 14 March 1996) is a Swedish football midfielder.

== Honours ==
KIF Örebro DFF

- Damallsvenskan Runner-up: 2014

Sweden U19

- UEFA Women's Under-19 Championship: 2015
