= Lauren Brennan =

Northern Irish footballer

Personal information
- Date of birth: 1 January 1995 (age 31)
- Position: Forward

Senior career*
Years	Team	Apps	(Gls)
- Sion Swifts
2016–2017	Grindavik	32	(9)
2019	Sion Swifts		
2020	Forfar Farmington		
2020–	Sion Swifts		

International career^{‡}
2015–	Northern Ireland		
- * Club domestic league appearances and goals as of 19:46, 30 August 2019 (UTC) ‡ National team caps and goals as of 19:46, 30 August 2019 (UTC)

Lauren Brennan (born 1 January 1995) is a Northern Irish footballer who plays as a forward and has appeared for the Northern Ireland women's national team.

== Career ==
In February 2020 Brennan was signed by Forfar Farmington. She had been playing for Sion Swifts, having spent two years in Iceland with Grindavik. A subsequent spell in Australia was curtailed by an anterior cruciate ligament injury.

Brennan has been capped for the Northern Ireland national team, appearing for the team during the 2019 FIFA Women's World Cup qualifying cycle.
