= Eleonora Piacezzi =

Italian footballer (born 1995)

Personal information
- Date of birth: 9 November 1995 (age 30)
- Height: 1.75 m (5 ft 9 in)
- Position: Defender

Senior career*
Years	Team	Apps	(Gls)
2012–2015	Sassari Torres		
2016–2017	Cuneo		
2017–2019	Atalanta		

International career
2011	Italy U17		
2012–2013	Italy U19		
2018	Italy U23		
2015–2016	Italy	3	(0)
- * Club domestic league appearances and goals

Eleonora Piacezzi (born 9 November 1995) is an Italian professional footballer who plays as a defender.
