= Tiia Peltonen =

Finnish football player (born 1995)

Personal information
- Full name: Tiia Katariina Peltonen
- Date of birth: 8 June 1995 (age 31)
- Place of birth: Helsinki, Finland
- Position: Defender

Team information
- Current team: Bologna
- Number: 5

Senior career*
Years	Team	Apps	(Gls)
2013–2018	PK-35 Vantaa	90	(0)
2019–2020	Åland United	41	(3)
2021–2022	FC Nordsjælland	27	(0)
2022–2026	Fortuna Hjørring	52	(3)

International career^{‡}
2011–2013	Finland U17	8	(1)
2013–2014	Finland U19	16	(0)
2019–	Finland	7	(0)
- * Club domestic league appearances and goals as of 17:58, 10 October 2024 (UTC) ‡ National team caps and goals as of 3 June 2020

Tiia Katariina Peltonen (born 8 June 1995) is a Finnish footballer who plays as a defender for Bologna and for the Finland women's national team.

During her entire career so far, Peltonen has won 5 Finnish Championships, winning them in 2014, 2015, 2016, 2018 and 2020.

== Career ==
After suffering from injuries at the beginning of 2015, Peltonen was able to return to playing in May 2015.

On 3 November 2018, Peltonen was awarded the Defender of the Year award.

On 6 November 2018, Peltonen was announced at Åland United for the 2019 season, with her joining in January 2019.

On 19 February 2021, Peltonen was announced at FC Nordsjælland.

On 3 July 2022, Peltonen was announced at Fortuna Hjørring. On 2 May 2024, she signed a new two-year contract with the club. On 3 September 2024, Peltonen was selected in the Danish league's Team of the Month.

== International career ==
Peltonen was called up to the 2018 Cyprus Women's Cup She made her international debut in the 2018 Cyprus Women's Cup on 2 March 2018, playing the full match.

Peltonen has appeared for the team during the 2019 FIFA Women's World Cup qualifying cycle.

Peltonen was part of the Finland squad that won the 2023 Cyprus Women's Cup for the first time.

Peltonen was part of the Finland squad that won the 2024 Pinatar Cup for the first time.
