= Adrijana Delić =

Serbian footballer (born 1996)

Personal information
- Date of birth: 21 February 1996 (age 30)
- Position: Forward

International career^{‡}
Years	Team	Apps	(Gls)
- Serbia
- ‡ National team caps and goals as of 19:48, 30 August 2019 (UTC)

Adrijana Delić (Serbian Cyrillic: Адријана Делић; born 21 February 1996) is a Serbian footballer who plays as a forward and has appeared for the Serbia women's national team.

== Career ==
Delić has been capped for the Serbia national team, appearing for the team during the 2019 FIFA Women's World Cup qualifying cycle.
