= Elien Van Wynendaele =

Belgian footballer

Personal information
- Full name: Elien Van Wynendaele
- Date of birth: 19 February 1995 (age 31)
- Place of birth: Belgium
- Height: 1.70 m (5 ft 7 in)
- Position: Midfielder

Youth career
- K. Racing Club Bambrugge

Senior career*
Years	Team	Apps	(Gls)
2011	RSC Anderlecht		
2011–2013	Club Brugge KV	22	(2)
2013–2019	AA Gent	72	(6)
2019–2020	Eendracht Aalst		

International career^{‡}
2010	Belgium U15	1	(0)
2010–2012	Belgium U17	17	(1)
2012–2014	Belgium U19	16	(1)
2014	Belgium U21	1	(1)
2015–2017	Belgium	19	(1)
- * Club domestic league appearances and goals as of 28 September 2022 ‡ National team caps and goals as of 28 September 2022

Elien Van Wynendaele (born 19 February 1995) is a former Belgian soccer midfielder who last played for Eendracht Aalst in Belgium's First Division.

== Club career ==
Van Wynendaele started her career at the age of 4, with the youth team of the East Flemish Bambrugge. She then moved to Club Brugge KV via RSC Anderlecht, in 2011. In 2013, she joined AA Gent.

Having struggled with knee injuries since the Euro 2017 tournament, Van Wynendaele decided to step down from top-tier football and signed for D1 team E. Aalst Ladies in 2019. She captained her last game for Gent during the final match of Play-Off 1 against KRC Genk Ladies.

In early 2020, after only a few months at Aalst, Van Wynendaele was again injured and ended her career definitely, at age 24.

== International career ==
On 7 June 2010, Van Wynendaele started her international career playing for Belgium U15 in a friendly match against the Netherlands. Between 2010 and 2012, she played 17 games for the Belgium U17 team and scored one goal. Her first game for the U17 side was on 28 August against Wales. On 19 September 2012, Van Wynendaele debuted for Belgium U19 team against Finland in Tammela, Finland. On 21 June 2014 she played her last match for the U19 side against the Netherlands in Mjøndalen. On 26 November 2014, Van Wynendaele played her first and only match for Belgium U21 team against Turkey in Tubize.

Van Wynendaele was part of the group who represented Belgium at the 2017 Cyprus Women's Cup and at the UEFA Women's Euro 2017.

== After football ==
Van Wynendaele works as a physiotherapist at the Medical Sports Centre in the municipality of Lebbeke.

== Career statistics ==
=== International ===
Appearances and goals by national team and year
National team	Year	Apps	Goals
U15	2010	1	0
Total		1	0
U17	2010	5	0
U17	2011	6	1
U17	2012	6	0
Total		17	1
U19	2012	5	1
U19	2013	5	0
U19	2014	6	0
Total		16	1
U21	2014	1	0
Total		1	0
Belgium	2015	5	0
Belgium	2016	7	0
Belgium	2017	7	1
Total		19	1

Scores and results list Belgium's goal tally first, score column indicates score after each Belgium goal.

List of international goals scored by Elien Van Wynendaele
No.	Date	Venue	Opponent	Score	Result	Competition	Ref.
1	3 March 2017	Antonis Papadopoulos Stadium, Larnaca, Cyprus	Italy	2–1	4–1	2017 Cyprus Cup	
