= Joanna Wróblewska =

Polish footballer

Personal information
- Date of birth: 27 December 1995 (age 30)
- Place of birth: Ciechanów, Poland
- Position: Midfielder

Team information
- Current team: Śląsk Wrocław
- Number: 27

Youth career
- 2007–2010: Trójka Ciechanów
- 2010–2011: MKS Ciechanów
- 2011–2013: AZS Wrocław

Senior career*
Years	Team	Apps	(Gls)
2013–2018	AZS Wrocław	118	(17)
2018–2020	GKS Katowice	30	(7)
2020–	Śląsk Wrocław	108	(29)

International career^{‡}
2011–2012	Poland U17	6	(2)
2012–2014	Poland U19	8	(1)
2016–	Poland	14	(0)
- * Club domestic league appearances and goals as of 21:54, 2 June 2026 (UTC) ‡ National team caps and goals as of 24 November 2024

Joanna Wróblewska (born 27 December 1995) is a Polish professional footballer who plays as a midfielder for Ekstraliga club Śląsk Wrocław.

A full international, she has earned 14 caps for the Poland women's national team.

== Career statistics ==
=== International ===
As of match played 22 February 2022

Appearances and goals by national team and year
National team	Year	Apps	Goals
Poland	2016	4	0
Poland	2017	1	0
Poland	2018	1	0
Poland	2020	2	0
Poland	2021	4	0
Poland	2022	2	0
Total		14	0
