= Magdalena Szaj =

Polish footballer

Personal information
- Full name: Magdalena Szaj
- Date of birth: 12 February 1995 (age 31)
- Place of birth: Poland
- Position: Midfielder

Youth career
- Surma Barczewo

Senior career*
Years	Team	Apps	(Gls)
2011–2014	AZS Wrocław	47	(21)
2014–2016	Turbine Potsdam II	4	(0)
2014–2016	Turbine Potsdam	4	(0)
Total		55	(21)

International career
2010–2012	Poland U17	9	(8)
2012–2014	Poland U19	8	(1)
2013–2014	Poland	10	(3)
- * Club domestic league appearances and goals

Magdalena Szaj (born 12 February 1995) is a Polish former footballer who played as a midfielder.

Due to injuries sustained while playing for 1. FFC Turbine Potsdam, she retired in 2016 at the age of 20 to focus on coaching.

== Career statistics ==
=== International ===
Appearances and goals by national team and year
National team	Year	Apps	Goals
Poland	2013	3	1
Poland	2014	7	2
Total		10	3
