= Laura Blanchard =

French association footballer (born 1995)

Personal information
- Date of birth: 3 August 1995 (age 31)
- Place of birth: Langres, France
- Position: Midfielder

Team information
- Current team: Dijon FCO

International career
Years	Team	Apps	(Gls)
- France (women U-19)

Laura Blanchard (born 3 August 1995) is a French professional footballer who plays as a midfielder. She plays as a midfielder for who has previously played for Dijon FCO.

== Honours ==
=== International ===
- France U17
  - 2012 FIFA U-17 Women's World Cup winner in Azerbaijan, 2012
