= Norway women's national under-17 football team =

Selected team of Norwegian football players under 17 years

Norway Women's U-17
- Association: Football Association of Norway (Norges Fotballforbund)
- Confederation: UEFA (Europe)
- Head coach: Elise Brotangen
- Most caps: Frida Maanum (24)
- Top scorer: Signe Gaupset (8)
- FIFA code: NOR
First colours	Second colours

UEFA Women's Under-17 Championship
- Appearances: 8 (first in 2009)
- Best result: Runners-up (2025)

FIFA U-17 Women's World Cup
- Appearances: 2 (first in 2025)
- Best result: Group stage (2025, 2026)

The Norway women's national under-17 football team represents Norway at the UEFA Women's Under-17 Championship and the FIFA U-17 Women's World Cup.

== Tournament record ==
=== UEFA Women's Under-17 Championship ===
The Norwegian team has participated in five of the thirteen UEFA Women's Under-17 Championships to date. The best result was reaching the semi-final in 2017, where no third place play-off was held.

Year	Result	Matches	Wins	Draws	Losses	GF	GA
(Switzerland) 2008	did not qualify						
(Switzerland) 2009	Fourth place	2	0	0	2	1	5
(Switzerland) 2010	did not qualify						
(Switzerland) 2011	did not qualify						
(Switzerland) 2012	did not qualify						
(Switzerland) 2013	did not qualify						
(England) 2014	did not qualify						
(Iceland) 2015	Group stage	3	1	1	1	4	4
(Belarus) 2016	Fourth place	5	2	0	3	6	9
(Czech Republic) 2017	Semi-finals	4	2	1	1	5	4
(Lithuania) 2018	did not qualify						
(Bulgaria) 2019	did not qualify						
(Sweden) ~~2020~~	Cancelled						
(Faroe Islands) ~~2021~~	Cancelled						
(Bosnia and Herzegovina) 2022	Group stage	3	0	0	3	1	7
(Estonia) 2023	did not qualify						
(Sweden) 2024	Group stage	3	1	0	2	2	11
(Faroe Islands) 2025	Runners-up	5	2	1	2	14	5
(Northern Ireland) 2026	Semi-finals	4	1	2	1	6	5
(Finland) 2027	TBD						
(Belgium) 2028	TBD						
(Turkey) 2029	TBD						
Total:8/16	Runners-up	29	9	5	15	39	50

=== FIFA U-17 Women's World Cup ===
Year	Round	Pld	W	D	L	GF	GA
(New Zealand) 2008	Did not qualify						
(Trinidad and Tobago) 2010	Did not qualify						
(Azerbaijan) 2012	Did not qualify						
(Costa Rica) 2014	Did not qualify						
(Jordan) 2016	Did not qualify						
(Uruguay) 2018	Did not qualify						
(India) 2022	Did not qualify						
(Dominican Republic) 2024	Did not qualify						
(Morocco) 2025	Group stage	3	0	0	3	0	12
(Morocco) 2026	Group stage	3	1	0	2	5	6
(Morocco) 2027	To be determined						
(Morocco) 2028	To be determined						
(Morocco) 2029	To be determined						
Total:2/13	Group stage	6	1	0	5	5	18

== Players ==
The following 20 players were called up by head coach Elise Brotangen for the 2022 UEFA Women's Under-17 Championship in May 2022.

No.	Pos.	Player	Date of birth (age)	Club
1	GK	Maria Sandvik	14 January 2005 (aged 17)	(Norwegian Football Federation) Viking FK
2	DF	Mia Hambro Svendsen	27 July 2005 (aged 16)	(Norwegian Football Federation) Røa IL
3	DF	Mathilde Eidissen Karlsen	11 January 2005 (aged 17)	(Norwegian Football Federation) Medkila IL
4	DF	Tilja Ellingsen	13 May 2005 (aged 16)	(Norwegian Football Federation) Klepp IL
5	DF	Anna Lervik	24 June 2005 (aged 16)	(Norwegian Football Federation) AaFK Fortuna
6	MF	Vilde H. Grøseth	12 March 2005 (aged 17)	(Norwegian Football Federation) Rosenborg BK
7	MF	Sarah Martinussen	17 March 2005 (aged 17)	(Norwegian Football Federation) Medkila IL
8	MF	Signe Gaupset	18 June 2005 (aged 16)	(Norwegian Football Federation) SK Brann
9	FW	Mawa Sesay	15 April 2005 (aged 17)	(Norwegian Football Federation) Strømsgodset IF
10	MF	Cille Nilsen	7 January 2006 (aged 16)	(Norwegian Football Federation) Avaldsnes IL
11	MF	Kamilla Melgård	16 December 2005 (aged 16)	(Norwegian Football Federation) Lyn Fotball
12	GK	Pia Grinde Hansen	12 February 2006 (aged 16)	(Norwegian Football Federation) Øvrevoll Hosle IL
13	DF	Ingrid Rame	31 May 2005 (aged 16)	(Norwegian Football Federation) Klepp IL
14	DF	Madelen Eid	31 March 2005 (aged 17)	(Norwegian Football Federation) AaFK Fortuna
15	MF	Amalie Isabell Taraldsen	16 August 2005 (aged 16)	(Norwegian Football Federation) Røa IL
16	MF	Tuva Henriksen	17 September 2005 (aged 16)	(Norwegian Football Federation) Lyn Fotball
17	MF	Ida Mortensen Natvik	15 November 2005 (aged 16)	(Norwegian Football Federation) Avaldsnes IL
18	MF	Ragnhild Eikeland Skage	4 January 2005 (aged 17)	(Norwegian Football Federation) FK Fyllingsdalen
19	FW	Mina Bell Folland	3 August 2005 (aged 16)	(Norwegian Football Federation) Arna-Bjørnar
20	FW	Linneah Rene Henriquez Rasmussen	15 August 2005 (aged 16)	(Norwegian Football Federation) FK Haugesund

== Head-to-head record ==
The following table shows Norway's head-to-head record in the FIFA U-17 Women's World Cup.

Opponent	Pld	W	D	L	GF	GA	GD	Win %
China	1	0	0	1	0	5	−5	0.00
Ecuador	1	0	0	1	0	2	−2	0.00
United States	1	0	0	1	0	5	−5	0.00
Total	3	0	0	3	0	12	−12	0.00

== See also ==
- Norway women's national football team
- Norway women's national under-19 football team
- FIFA U-17 Women's World Cup
- UEFA Women's Under-17 Championship
