= Anđela Šešlija =

Bosnia and Herzegovina footballer

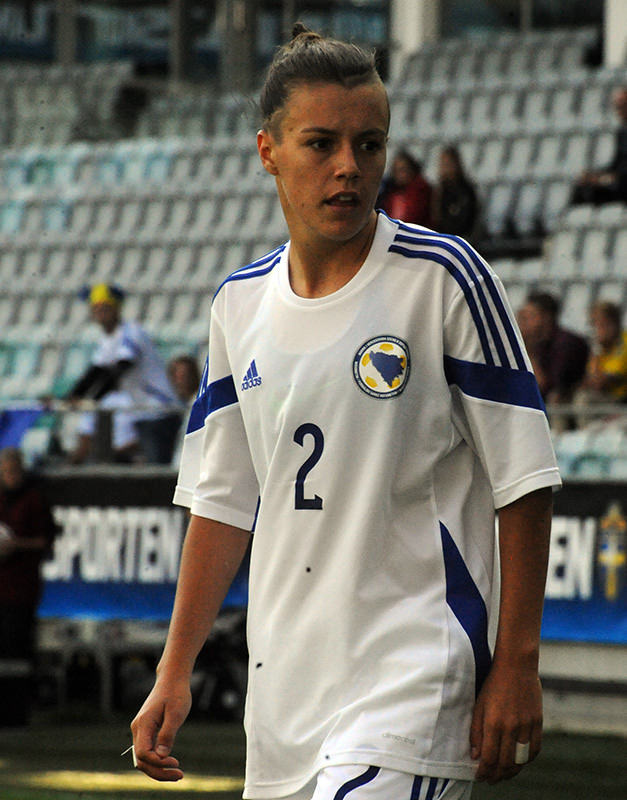

Personal information
- Date of birth: 15 September 1995 (age 31)
- Place of birth: Sarajevo, Bosnia and Herzegovina
- Height: 5 ft 4 in (1.63 m)
- Position: Defender

College career
Years	Team	Apps	(Gls)
2015–2018	Holy Cross Crusaders	67	(13)

Senior career*
Years	Team	Apps	(Gls)
2011–2014	SFK Sarajevo		

International career
2012–	Bosnia and Herzegovina		
- * Club domestic league appearances and goals

Anđela Šešlija (born 15 September 1995) is a Bosnian football defender currently playing in the Bosnian Championship for SFK 2000 Sarajevo, with which she has also played the UEFA Champions League. She is a member of the Bosnian national team.

Šešlija lived in Minnesota from 2006 to 2010, at which point she and her family moved back to Bosnia. She later returned to the United States to play a postgraduate year at Worcester Academy in Worcester, Massachusetts, recording 14 goals and five assists.
