= Barla Deplazes =

Swiss footballer (born 1995)

Personal information
- Full name: Barla Catrina Deplazes
- Date of birth: 14 November 1995 (age 30)
- Place of birth: Zürich, Switzerland
- Height: 1.73 m (5 ft 8 in)
- Position: Forward

Youth career
- FC Turicum
- 2005–2010: SV Höngg

Senior career*
Years	Team	Apps	(Gls)
2010–2020	FC Zürich		

International career^{‡}
2011–2012	Switzerland U17		
2012–2013	Switzerland U19		
2015–2017	Switzerland	1	(0)
- * Club domestic league appearances and goals as of 5 June 2015 ‡ National team caps and goals as of 23 June 2015

Barla Catrina Deplazes (born 14 November 1995) is a retired Swiss football forward, who played for FC Zürich of Switzerland's Nationalliga A. Since her debut in March 2015, a 4–1 defeat by Brazil, she has been a member of the Switzerland national team.
