= Laurie Saulnier =

French footballer (born 1995)

Personal information
- Date of birth: 8 May 1995 (age 31)
- Place of birth: Avignon, France
- Height: 1.68 m (5 ft 6 in)
- Position: Midfielder

International career
Years	Team	Apps	(Gls)
- France (women U-19)

Laurie Saulnier (born 8 May 1995) is a French footballer. Saulnier played for Football féminin Nîmes Métropole Gard.

== Honours ==
=== International ===
- France U17
  - 2012 FIFA U-17 Women's World Cup winner in Azerbaijan, 2012
