= Germany women's national under-17 football team =

National association football team

Germany Women's U-17
- Nickname(s): Die Nationalelf (The National Eleven)
- Association: German Football Association (Deutscher Fußball-Bund, DFB)
- Confederation: UEFA (Europe)
- Head coach: Sabine Loderer
- Most caps: Marie Pollmann (30)
- Top scorer: Kyra Malinowski (22)
- FIFA code: GER
First colours	Second colours

First international
- Germany 3–0 Norway (Steinfurt, Germany; 12 June 1992)

Biggest win
- Germany 13–0 North Macedonia (Queluz, Portugal; 23 March 2023)

Biggest defeat
- Sweden 4–0 Germany (Sandviken, Sweden; 9 June 1999); Spain 4–0 Germany (Hinckley, England; 2 December 2013); Germany 0–4 Spain (Akranes, Iceland; 25 June 2015); Spain 4–0 Germany (Marbella, Spain; 12 January 2023); Spain 4–0 Germany (Alicante, Spain; 9 January 2025)

European Championship
- Appearances: 13 (first in 2008)
- Best result: Champions (2008, 2009, 2012, 2014, 2016, 2017, 2019, 2022)

FIFA U-17 Women's World Cup
- Appearances: 8 (first in 2008)
- Best result: Third place (2008)
Medal record
FIFA U-17 Women's World Cup
Bronze medal – third place	2008 New Zealand
UEFA Women's Championship
Gold medal – first place	2008 Switzerland
Gold medal – first place	2009 Switzerland
Gold medal – first place	2012 Switzerland
Gold medal – first place	2014 England
Gold medal – first place	2016 Belarus
Gold medal – first place	2017 Czech Republic
Gold medal – first place	2019 Bulgaria
Gold medal – first place	2022 Bosnia and Herzegovina

The Germany women's national under-17 football team (German: Deutsche Fußballnationalmannschaft (U-17-Juniorinnen)) represents Germany in international women's association football and is governed by the German Football Association (DFB). The national team was founded in 1992 as U-16 national team. Since the summer of 2001, the age limit is 17.

== Current squad ==
=== Previous squads ===
- 2008 FIFA U-17 Women's World Cup
- 2010 FIFA U-17 Women's World Cup
- 2012 FIFA U-17 Women's World Cup
- 2014 FIFA U-17 Women's World Cup
- 2016 FIFA U-17 Women's World Cup
- 2018 FIFA U-17 Women's World Cup

== Competitive record ==
=== FIFA U-17 Women's World Cup ===
The German team participated 8 tournaments until 2026. Their best result was third place in 2008.

Year	Result	Pld	W	D*	L	GF	GA
(New Zealand) 2008	Third place	6	4	1	1	16	6
(Trinidad and Tobago) 2010	Quarter-finals	4	3	0	1	22	2
(Azerbaijan) 2012	Fourth place	6	3	1	2	11	8
(Costa Rica) 2014	Group stage	3	0	1	2	5	7
(Jordan) 2016	Quarter-finals	4	2	1	1	6	4
(Uruguay) 2018	Quarter-finals	4	2	0	2	8	3
(India) 2022	Fourth place	6	4	1	1	16	6
(Dominican Republic) 2024	Did not qualify						
(Morocco) 2025	Did not qualify						
(Morocco) 2026	Round of 16	4	3	0	1	8	4
(Morocco) 2027	To be determined						
(Morocco) 2028	To be determined						
(Morocco) 2029	To be determined						
Total	8/13	37	21	5	11	92	40

* Draws include knockout matches decided by penalty shoot-out.

=== UEFA Women's Under-17 Championship ===
The German team has participated in eleven of the twelve UEFA Women's Under-17 Championship winning 7 times and establishing a record for most european titles.

Year	Result	Pld	W	D	L	GF	GA
(Switzerland) 2008	Champions	2	2	0	0	4	0
(Switzerland) 2009	Champions	2	2	0	0	11	1
(Switzerland) 2010	Third place	2	1	0	1	3	1
(Switzerland) 2011	Third place	2	1	1	0	10	4
(Switzerland) 2012	Champions	2	1	1	0	3	1
(Switzerland) 2013	did not qualify						
(England) 2014	Champions	5	3	1	1	10	7
(Iceland) 2015	Semi-finals	4	2	0	2	10	5
(Belarus) 2016	Champions	5	2	3	0	10	5
(Czech Republic) 2017	Champions	5	3	2	0	12	4
(Lithuania) 2018	Runners-up	5	3	1	1	20	5
(Bulgaria) 2019	Champions	5	3	1	1	12	5
(Sweden) ~~2020~~	Cancelled						
(Faroe Islands) ~~2021~~	Cancelled						
(Bosnia and Herzegovina) 2022	Champions	5	4	1	0	9	2
(Estonia) 2023	Group stage	3	1	0	2	6	4
(Sweden) 2024	did not qualify						
(Faroe Islands) 2025	did not qualify						
(Northern Ireland) 2026	Champions	5	3	1	1	5	2
(Finland) 2027	to be determined						
(Belgium) 2028	to be determined						
(Turkey) 2029	to be determined						
Total:14/16	9 Titles	52	31	12	9	125	46

=== Nordic Cup ===
From 1988 to 1997 and 2008 to present (U16 national team); from 1998 to 2007 (U-17 national team)

Host / Year	Position
Denmark 1988	No participation
Norway 1989	5th place*
Sweden 1990	No participation
Finland 1991	No participation
Denmark 1992	No participation
Netherlands 1993	No participation
Iceland 1994	No participation
Norway 1995	No participation
Finland 1996	No participation
Sweden 1997	4th place (U-16)
Denmark 1998	Champions (U-17)
Netherlands 1999	4th place (U-17)
Finland 2000	Runners-up (U-17)
Norway 2001	Champions (U-17)
Iceland 2002	6th place (U-17)
Sweden 2003	Runners-up (U-17)
Denmark 2004	Third Place (U-17)
Norway 2005	Champions (U-17)
Finland 2006	Third Place (U-17)
Norway 2007	Third Place (U-17)
Iceland 2008	Champions (U-16)
Sweden 2009	Runners-up (U-16)
Denmark 2010	Runners-up (U-16)
Finland 2011	7th place (U-16)
Norway 2012	5th place (U-16)
Iceland 2013	Champions (U-16)
Sweden 2014	Champions (U-16)
Denmark 2015	Runners-up (U-16)
Norway 2016	Runners-up (U-16)
2017	Third Place (U-16)
Total	21/30

(*) Note Norway 1989: Participated the selection of the Hessian Football Association

== Head-to-head record ==
The following table shows Germany's head-to-head record in the FIFA U-17 Women's World Cup.

Opponent	Pld	W	D	L	GF	GA	GD	Win %
Argentina	1	1	0	0	2	1	+1	100.00
Brazil	2	2	0	0	4	1	+3	100.00
Cameroon	2	1	0	1	2	1	+1	50.00
Canada	4	1	2	1	6	5	+1	25.00
China	1	0	1	0	1	1	+0	0.00
Chile	1	1	0	0	6	0	+6	100.00
Costa Rica	1	1	0	0	5	0	+5	100.00
England	1	1	0	0	3	0	+3	100.00
Ghana	4	2	0	2	5	5	+0	50.00
Mexico	1	1	0	0	9	0	+9	100.00
Morocco	1	1	0	0	4	2	+2	100.00
New Zealand	2	2	0	0	5	1	+4	100.00
Nigeria	2	1	1	0	5	4	+1	50.00
North Korea	5	1	1	3	9	9	+0	20.00
South Africa	1	1	0	0	10	1	+9	100.00
South Korea	1	1	0	0	3	0	+3	100.00
Spain	2	0	0	2	1	3	−2	0.00
United States	2	1	0	1	5	2	+3	50.00
Uruguay	1	1	0	0	5	2	+3	100.00
Venezuela	2	1	0	1	2	2	+0	50.00
Total	37	21	5	11	92	40	+52	56.76

== See also ==
- Germany women's national football team
- Germany women's national under-20 football team
- Germany women's national under-19 football team
- FIFA U-17 Women's World Cup
- UEFA Women's Under-17 Championship
