= Carmen Pulver =

Swiss footballer (born 1995)

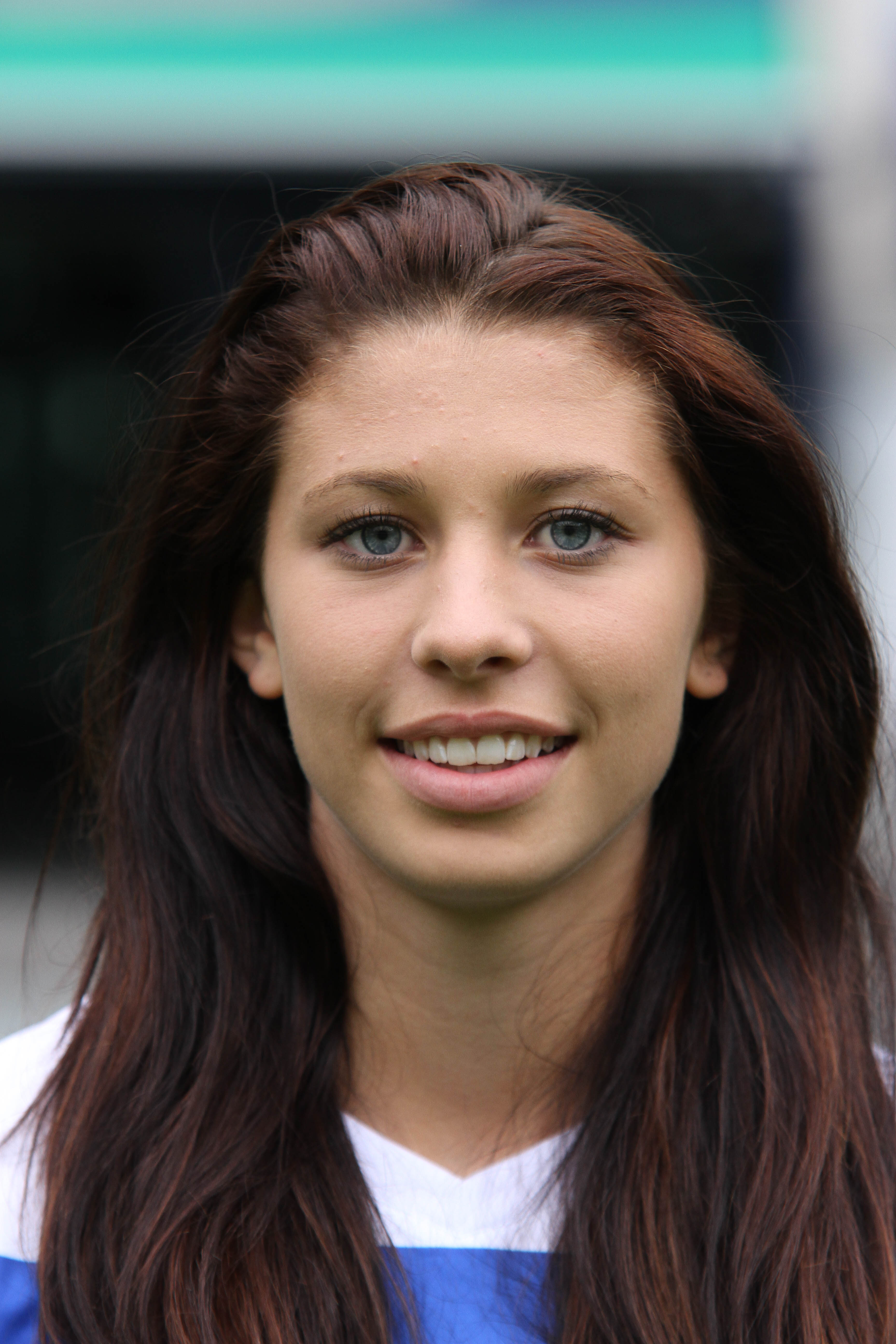
- Pulver at MSV Duisburg in 2014

Personal information
- Date of birth: 18 September 1995 (age 31)
- Place of birth: Herrliberg, Switzerland
- Height: 1.60 m (5 ft 3 in)
- Position: Midfielder

International career
Years	Team	Apps	(Gls)
- Switzerland

Carmen Pulver (born 18 September 1995) is a Swiss former professional footballer who played as a midfielder.
