= Audrey Wuichet =

Swiss footballer

Personal information
- Date of birth: 29 June 1995 (age 31)
- Position: Midfielder

Team information
- Current team: Yverdon

Audrey Wuichet is a Swiss footballer who plays for the Swiss side Yverdon.
