= Denmark women's national under-17 football team =

National U-17 association football team

Denmark Women's U-17
- Nickname(s): De Rød-Hvide (The Red and White); Danish Dynamite
- Association: Danish Football Association
- Confederation: UEFA (Europe)
- Head coach: Claus Struck
- Most caps: Line Sigvardsen Jensen (25)
- Top scorer: Signe Bruun (19)
- FIFA code: DEN
First colours	Second colours

UEFA Women's Under-17 Championship
- Appearances: 4 (first in 2008)
- Best result: Semi-finals (2008, 2012)

FIFA U-17 Women's World Cup
- Appearances: 1 (first in 2008)
- Best result: Quarter-finals (2008)

Denmark women's national under-17 football team represents Denmark in international youth football competitions.

== FIFA U-17 Women's World Cup ==
The team has qualified in 2008

Year	Result	Matches	Wins	Draws*	Losses	GF	GA
(New Zealand) 2008	Quarter-finals	4	1	2	1	3	6
(Trinidad and Tobago) 2010	did not qualify						
(Azerbaijan) 2012	did not qualify						
(Costa Rica) 2014	did not qualify						
(Jordan) 2016	did not qualify						
(Uruguay) 2018	did not qualify						
(India) 2022	did not qualify						
(Dominican Republic) 2024	did not qualify						
(Morocco) 2025	did not qualify						
(Morocco) 2026	did not qualify						
Total	1/10	4	1	2	1	3	6

== UEFA Women's Under-17 Championship ==
The team has participated in 2008 and 2012

Year	Result	GP	W	D	L	GF	GA
(Switzerland) 2008	Third place	2	1	0	1	4	2
(Switzerland) 2009	did not qualify						
(Switzerland) 2010	did not qualify						
(Switzerland) 2011	did not qualify						
(Switzerland) 2012	Third place	2	0	1	1	0	2
(Switzerland) 2013	did not qualify						
(England) 2014	did not qualify						
(Iceland) 2015	did not qualify						
(Belarus) 2016	did not qualify						
(Czech Republic) 2017	did not qualify						
(Lithuania) 2018	did not qualify						
(Bulgaria) 2019	Group stage	3	1	1	1	2	1
(Sweden) ~~2020~~	Cancelled						
(Faroe Islands) ~~2021~~	Cancelled						
(Bosnia and Herzegovina) 2022	Group stage	3	1	1	1	7	3
(Estonia) 2023	did not qualify						
(Sweden) 2024	did not qualify						
(Faroe Islands) 2025	did not qualify						
(Northern Ireland) 2026	did not qualify						
(Finland) 2027	to be determined						
(Belgium) 2028	to be determined						
(Turkey) 2029	to be determined						
Total	4/16	10	3	3	4	13	8

=== Previous squads ===
2008 FIFA U-17 Women's World Cup

== Players ==
=== Current squad ===
The following players were selected for the 2022 UEFA Women's Under-17 Championship in Bosnia-Herzegovina.

Head coach: Claus Struck

No.	Pos.	Player	Date of birth (age)	Caps	Goals	Club
1	GK	Camilla Bech Bonde	20 February 2005 (aged 17)	5	0	(Danish Football Association) AGF
16	GK	Liva Petersson	22 June 2005 (aged 16)	1	0	(Danish Football Association) FC Thy-Thisted Q
2	DF	Celine Kampmann	8 March 2005 (aged 17)	2	0	(Danish Football Association) Odense Q
3	DF	Ida Marie Jǿrgensen	3 March 2005 (aged 17)	11	1	(Danish Football Association) Kolding IF
4	DF	Meryem Baskaya	14 July 2005 (aged 16)	8	0	(Danish Football Association) Brøndby IF
5	DF	Laura Kjærsgård	17 February 2005 (aged 17)	10	0	(Danish Football Association) AGF
11	DF	Frida Nautrup	23 May 2006 (aged 15)	3	0	(Danish Football Association) FC Thy-Thisted Q
12	DF	Kamma Meldgaard	17 May 2005 (aged 16)	8	0	(Danish Football Association) SIF Q
13	DF	Mille Larsen	6 September 2005 (aged 16)	2	0	(Danish Football Association) Odense Q
6	MF	Caroline Nicolaisen	23 June 2005 (aged 16)	6	0	(Danish Football Association) Odense Q
7	MF	Josefine Valvik	24 June 2006 (aged 15)	8	0	(Danish Football Association) Fortuna Hjørring
8	MF	Pernille Sanvig	26 November 2005 (aged 16)	11	1	(Danish Football Association) Kolding IF
10	MF	Jóhanna Sørensen	28 November 2005 (aged 16)	11	3	(Danish Football Association) FC Nordsjælland
14	MF	Karoline Olesen	3 February 2005 (aged 17)	5	0	(Danish Football Association) Fortuna Hjørring
17	MF	Maja Hagemann	7 October 2005 (aged 16)	9	1	(Danish Football Association) Fortuna Hjørring
20	MF	Alma Aagaard	29 January 2006 (aged 16)	4	2	(Danish Football Association) FC Nordsjælland
9	FW	Emilía Ásgeirsdóttir (captain)	31 January 2005 (aged 17)	11	8	(Danish Football Association) FC Nordsjælland
15	FW	Clara La Cour	28 January 2005 (aged 17)	11	3	(Danish Football Association) FC Nordsjælland
18	FW	Elvira Nejmann	19 February 2006 (aged 16)	9	0	(Danish Football Association) AGF
19	FW	Elisabeth Nielsen	6 January 2005 (aged 17)	8	0	(Danish Football Association) Odense Q

== See also ==
- Denmark women's national football team
