= UEFA Women's Under-17 Championship =

- Organiser(s): UEFA
- Founded: 2007
- Region: Europe
- Teams: 8 (finals); Maximum of 55 (qualifiers)
- Related competitions: UEFA Women's Under-19 Championship
- Current champions: Germany (9th title)
- Most championships: Germany (9 titles)
- Website: uefa.com/womensunder17
- 2026 UEFA Women's Under-17 Championship

The UEFA European Women's Under-17 Championship or simply UEFA Women's Under-17 Championship, is an annual European championship football tournament, organized by UEFA, for national teams of women under age seventeen. The tournament was first played out in 2007–08, having been approved by the UEFA Executive Committee on 22 May 2006. It is also a FIFA U-17 Women's World Cup qualifying competition. National under-17 teams whose countries belong to the European governing body UEFA can register to enter the competition. Germany is the most successful team in this competition, having won nine titles, and are the current champions.

== Format ==
The Championship has three phases: two qualifying rounds open to all eligible nations and the finals phase which is composed of 8 qualified teams.

In 2011 it was announced that the tournament will be expanded to eight teams, and beginning with the 2014 edition the eight qualified teams play round-robin in two groups of four.

== Results ==
Edition	Year	Host	Final			Third place match/Losing semi-finalists		
Edition	Year	Host	Champions	Score	Runners-up	Third place	Score	Fourth place
1	2008	Switzerland	Germany	3–0	France	Denmark	4–1	England
2	2009	Switzerland	Germany	7–0	Spain	France	3–1	Norway
3	2010	Switzerland	Spain	0–0 (4–1 p.)	Republic of Ireland	Germany	3–0	Netherlands
4	2011	Switzerland	Spain	1–0	France	Germany	8–2	Iceland
5	2012	Switzerland	Germany	1–1 (4–3 p.)	France	Denmark	0–0 (5–4 p.)	Switzerland
6	2013	Switzerland	Poland	1–0	Sweden	Spain	4–0	Belgium
7	2014	England	Germany	1–1 (3–1 p.)	Spain	Italy	0–0 (4–3 p.)	England
8	2015	Iceland	Spain	5–2	Switzerland	France and Germany		
9	2016	Belarus	Germany	0–0 (3–2 p.)	Spain	England	2–1	Norway
10	2017	Czech Republic	Germany	0–0 (3–1 p.)	Spain	Netherlands and Norway		
11	2018	Lithuania	Spain	2–0	Germany	Finland	2–1	England
12	2019	Bulgaria	Germany	1–1 (3–2 p.)	Netherlands	Portugal and Spain		
-	~~2020~~	~~Sweden~~	Cancelled due to COVID-19 pandemic					
-	~~2021~~	~~Faroe Islands~~	Cancelled due to COVID-19 pandemic					
13	2022	Bosnia and Herzegovina	Germany	2–2 (3–2 p.)	Spain	France	2–0	Netherlands
14	2023	Estonia	France	3–2	Spain	England and Switzerland		
15	2024	Sweden	Spain	4–0	England	Poland	2–2 (4–2 p.)	France
16	2025	Faroe Islands	Netherlands	2–1	Norway	France and Italy		
17	2026	Northern Ireland	Germany	1–0	France	Norway and Spain		
18	2027	Finland						
19	2028	Belgium						
20	2029	Turkey						

- Key:
  - p.: match ended by penalty shoot-out

== Teams reaching the top four ==
Country	Winners	Runners-up	Third-place	Fourth-place	Losing semi-finalists	Total (top four)
Germany	9 (2008, 2009, 2012, 2014, 2016, 2017, 2019, 2022, 2026)	1 (2018)	2 (2010, 2011)		1 (2015)	13
Spain	5 (2010, 2011, 2015, 2018, 2024)	6 (2009, 2014, 2016, 2017, 2022, 2023)	1 (2013)		2 (2019, 2026)	14
France	1 (2023)	4 (2008, 2011, 2012, 2026)	2 (2009, 2022)	1 (2024)	2 (2015, 2025)	10
Netherlands	1 (2025)	1 (2019)		2 (2010, 2022)	1 (2017)	5
Poland	1 (2013)		1 (2024)			2
England		1 (2024)	1 (2016)	3 (2008, 2014, 2018)	1 (2023)	6
Norway		1 (2025)		2 (2009, 2016)	2 (2017, 2026)	5
Switzerland		1 (2015)		1 (2012)	1 (2023)	3
Republic of Ireland		1 (2010)				1
Sweden		1 (2013)				1
Denmark			2 (2008, 2012)			2
Italy			1 (2014)		1 (2025)	2
Finland			1 (2018)			1
Iceland				1 (2011)		1
Belgium				1 (2013)		1
Portugal					1 (2019)	1
Total	16	16	11	11	12	66

== Comprehensive team results by tournament ==
Legend

- 1st – Champions
- 2nd – Runners-up
- 3rd – Third place
- 4th – Fourth place
- SF – Semi-finalists
- GS – Group stage (from 2014 onwards)
- • – Did not qualify
- × – Did not enter / Withdrew
- Q – Qualified for upcoming tournament
- — Hosts

For each tournament, the number of teams in each finals tournament (in brackets) are shown.

Team	2008 (Switzerland) (4)	2009 (Switzerland) (4)	2010 (Switzerland) (4)	2011 (Switzerland) (4)	2012 (Switzerland) (4)	2013 (Switzerland) (4)	2014 (England) (8)	2015 (Iceland) (8)	2016 (Belarus) (8)	2017 (Czech Republic) (8)	2018 (Lithuania) (8)	2019 (Bulgaria) (8)	2022 (Bosnia and Herzegovina) (8)	2023 (Estonia) (8)	2024 (Sweden) (8)	2025 (Faroe Islands) (8)	2026 (Northern Ireland) (8)	Total
Austria	×	×	•	•	•	•	GS	•	•	•	•	GS	•	•	•	GS	•	3
Belarus	•	•	•	•	•	•	•	•	GS	•	•	•	×	•	•	•	•	1
Belgium	•	•	•	•	•	4th	•	•	•	•	•	•	•	•	GS	•	•	2
Bosnia and Herzegovina	×	×	×	×	•	•	•	•	•	•	•	•	GS	•	•	•	•	1
Bulgaria	•	•	•	•	•	•	•	•	•	•	•	GS	•	•	•	•	•	1
Czech Republic	•	•	•	•	•	•	•	•	GS	GS	•	•	•	•	•	•	•	2
Denmark	3rd	•	•	•	3rd	•	•	•	•	•	•	GS	GS	•	•	•	•	4
England	4th	•	•	•	•	•	4th	GS	3rd	GS	4th	GS	•	SF	2nd	•	GS	10
Estonia	•	•	•	•	•	•	•	•	•	•	•	•	•	GS	•	•	•	1
Faroe Islands	•	•	•	•	•	•	•	•	•	•	•	•	•	•	•	GS	•	1
Finland	•	•	•	•	•	•	•	•	•	•	3rd	•	GS	•	•	•	GS	3
France	2nd	3rd	•	2nd	2nd	•	GS	SF	•	GS	•	•	3rd	1st	4th	SF	2nd	12
Germany	1st	1st	3rd	3rd	1st	•	1st	SF	1st	1st	2nd	1st	1st	GS	•	•	1st	14
Iceland	•	•	•	4th	•	•	•	GS	•	•	•	•	•	•	•	•	•	2
Italy	•	•	•	•	•	•	3rd	•	GS	•	GS	•	•	•	•	SF	•	4
Lithuania	•	•	•	•	•	•	•	•	•	•	GS	•	•	•	•	•	•	1
Netherlands	•	•	4th	•	•	•	•	•	•	SF	GS	2nd	4th	•	•	1st	•	6
Northern Ireland	•	•	•	•	•	•	•	•	•	•	•	•	•	•	•	•	GS	1
Norway	•	4th	•	•	•	•	•	GS	4th	SF	•	•	GS	•	GS	2nd	SF	8
Poland	•	•	•	•	•	1st	•	•	•	•	GS	•	•	GS	3rd	GS	GS	6
Portugal	×	×	×	×	×	×	GS	•	•	•	•	SF	•	•	GS	•	•	3
Republic of Ireland	•	•	2nd	•	•	•	•	GS	•	GS	•	•	•	•	•	•	•	3
Scotland	•	•	•	•	•	•	GS	•	•	•	•	•	•	•	•	•	•	1
Serbia	×	•	•	•	•	•	•	•	GS	•	•	•	•	•	•	•	•	1
Spain	•	2nd	1st	1st	•	3rd	2nd	1st	2nd	2nd	1st	SF	2nd	2nd	1st	GS	SF	15
Sweden	•	•	•	•	•	2nd	•	•	•	•	•	•	•	GS	GS	•	•	3
Switzerland	•	•	•	•	4th	•	•	2nd	•	•	•	•	•	SF	•	•	•	3

== Player of the Tournament ==
For certain tournaments, the official website UEFA.com chose a Golden Player. Starting from 2023 a Player of the Tournament has been chosen by UEFA's Technical Observer panel.

Year	Player
2008	(Germany) Alexandra Popp
2009	(Germany) Kyra Malinowski
2010	(Spain) Lola Gallardo
2011	(Spain) Alba Pomares
2012	(France) Sandie Toletti
2013	(Poland) Ewa Pajor
2014	(Spain) Andrea Falcón
2015	(Germany) Stefanie Sanders
2016	(Germany) Caroline Siems
2017	(Germany) Lena Oberdorf
2018	None awarded
2019	None awarded
2022	None awarded
2023	(Spain) Vicky López
2024	(Spain) Alba Cerrato
2025	(Netherlands) Ranneke Derks
2026	(Germany) Mirja Kropp

== Number of teams ==
Year of tournament	Number of teams	Format
2008–2013	4	Semi-finals, third place play-off and final
2014–2024	8	Two groups of four team, semi-finals, third place play-off (only in even years, for qualifying to FIFA U-17 Women's World Cup) and final
2025–present	8	Two groups of four team, semi-finals, and final

== See also ==
- FIFA Women's World Cup
- FIFA U-17 Women's World Cup
- FIFA U-20 Women's World Cup
- UEFA Women's Under-19 Championship
- UEFA Women's Championship
- UEFA Women's Champions League
- UEFA Women's Europa Cup
