= 2015 UEFA Women's Under-17 Championship qualification =

2015 UEFA Women's Under-17 Championship qualifying competition

Tournament details
- Dates: 25 September – 31 October 2014 (qualifying round); 22 March – 16 April 2015 (elite round)
- Teams: 43 (from 1 confederation)

Tournament statistics
- Matches played: 96
- Goals scored: 355 (3.7 per match)
- Top scorer: (Denmark) Signe Bruun (10 goals)

The 2015 UEFA Women's Under-17 Championship qualifying competition was a women's under-17 football competition played in 2014 and 2015 to determine the seven teams joining Iceland, who qualified automatically as hosts, in the 2015 UEFA Women's Under-17 Championship final tournament. A total of 43 UEFA member national teams entered the qualifying competition.

Each match lasted 80 minutes, consisting of two halves of 40 minutes, with an interval of 15 minutes.

== Format ==
The qualifying competition consisted of two rounds:

- Qualifying round: Apart from Germany, France and Spain, which receive byes to the elite round as the three teams with the highest seeding coefficient, the remaining 40 teams were drawn into 10 groups of four teams. Each group was played in single round-robin format at one of the teams selected as hosts after the draw. The 10 group winners, the 10 runners-up, and the third-placed team with the best record against the first and second-placed teams in their group advanced to the elite round.
- Elite round: The 24 teams were drawn into six groups of four teams. Each group was played in single round-robin format at one of the teams selected as hosts after the draw. The six group winners and the runner-up with the best record against the first and third-placed teams in their group qualified for the final tournament.

=== Tiebreakers ===
If two or more teams were equal on points on completion of a mini-tournament, the following tie-breaking criteria were applied, in the order given, to determine the rankings:

1. Higher number of points obtained in the mini-tournament matches played among the teams in question;
2. Superior goal difference resulting from the mini-tournament matches played among the teams in question;
3. Higher number of goals scored in the mini-tournament matches played among the teams in question;
4. If, after having applied criteria 1 to 3, teams still had an equal ranking, criteria 1 to 3 were reapplied exclusively to the mini-tournament matches between the teams in question to determine their final rankings. If this procedure did not lead to a decision, criteria 5 to 9 applied;
5. Superior goal difference in all mini-tournament matches;
6. Higher number of goals scored in all mini-tournament matches;
7. If only two teams had the same number of points, and they were tied according to criteria 1 to 6 after having met in the last round of the mini-tournament, their rankings were determined by a penalty shoot-out (not used if more than two teams had the same number of points, or if their rankings were not relevant for qualification for the next stage).
8. Lower disciplinary points total based only on yellow and red cards received in the mini-tournament matches (red card = 3 points, yellow card = 1 point, expulsion for two yellow cards in one match = 3 points);
9. Drawing of lots.

To determine the best third-placed team from the qualifying round and the best runner-up from the elite round, the results against the teams in fourth place were discarded. The following criteria were applied:

1. Higher number of points;
2. Superior goal difference;
3. Higher number of goals scored;
4. Lower disciplinary points total based only on yellow and red cards received (red card = 3 points, yellow card = 1 point, expulsion for two yellow cards in one match = 3 points);
5. Drawing of lots.

== Qualifying round ==
=== Draw ===
The draw for the qualifying round was held at UEFA headquarters in Nyon, Switzerland on 20 November 2013 at 09:00 CET (UTC+1).

The teams were seeded according to their coefficient ranking, calculated based on the following:

- 2011 UEFA Women's Under-17 Championship final tournament and qualifying competition (qualifying round and elite round)
- 2012 UEFA Women's Under-17 Championship final tournament and qualifying competition (qualifying round and elite round)
- 2013 UEFA Women's Under-17 Championship final tournament and qualifying competition (qualifying round and elite round)

Each group contained one team from Pot A, one team from Pot B, and two teams from Pot C.

Bye to elite round
Team	Coeff	Rank
Germany	13.333	1
France	11.333	2
Spain	10.667	3

Pot A
Team	Coeff	Rank
Denmark	9.167	4
Switzerland	8.333	5
Sweden	8.167	6
Poland	7.667	7
Belgium	7.333	8
Norway	7.333	9
Czech Republic	7.167	10
Republic of Ireland	6.333	11
Netherlands	6.167	12
England	6.000	13

Pot B
Team	Coeff	Rank
Finland	5.667	14
Russia	5.667	15
Scotland	5.333	16
Italy	5.167	17
Austria	5.000	18
Serbia	4.500	19
Hungary	4.333	20
Wales	4.000	21
Turkey	4.000	22
Slovenia	4.000	23

Pot C
Team	Coeff	Rank
Romania	3.333	24
Bosnia and Herzegovina	3.333	25
Northern Ireland	3.167	26
Belarus	3.000	27
Greece	2.333	28
Ukraine	2.000	29
Montenegro	2.000	30
Bulgaria	1.333	31
Israel	1.333	32
Latvia	1.000	33
Faroe Islands	1.000	34
Moldova	1.000	35
Estonia	1.000	36
Lithuania	1.000	37
Azerbaijan	1.000	38
Slovakia	1.000	39
Croatia	0.667	40
Kazakhstan	0.333	41
Macedonia	0.000	42
Portugal	—	43

Notes

- Iceland (Coeff: 1.000) qualified automatically for the final tournament as hosts.
- Albania, Andorra, Armenia, Cyprus, Georgia, Gibraltar, Liechtenstein, Luxembourg, Malta, and San Marino did not enter.

=== Groups ===
Times up to 25 October 2014 were CEST (UTC+2), thereafter times were CET (UTC+1).

==== Group 1 ====
Pos	Team	Pld	W	D	L	GF	GA	GD	Pts	Qualification
1	England	3	3	0	0	18	1	+17	9	Elite round
2	Russia	3	2	0	1	9	5	+4	6	Elite round
3	Bulgaria (H)	3	1	0	2	2	6	−4	3	
4	Moldova	3	0	0	3	1	18	−17	0	

Source: UEFA
Rules for classification: Qualification tiebreakers
(H) Hosts
26 October 2014
14:00

England	9–0	Moldova
Plumptre 19', 54'; Kelly 31', 65'; Russo 33'; Brown 51'; Pacheco 53'; Catline 77'; Stanway 80'	Report

Albena 1, Albena
Referee: Silvia Domingos (Portugal)
26 October 2014
14:00

Russia	1–0	Bulgaria
Trikina 50'	Report

Kavarna Stadium, Kavarna
Referee: Melis Özçiğdem (Turkey)

28 October 2014
14:00

England	5–0	Bulgaria
Cain 13'; Fisk 30', 57'; Stanway 72', 75'	Report

Kavarna Stadium, Kavarna
Referee: Melis Özçiğdem (Turkey)
28 October 2014
14:00

Moldova	1–7	Russia
Țabur 32'	Report	Trikina 5'; Voloshina 43'; Drozdova 54'; Bespalikova 62'; Zarubina 72', 79', 80+2'

Albena 1, Albena
Referee: Justina Lavrenovaite (Lithuania)

31 October 2014
14:00

Russia	1–4	England
Shvedova 32' (pen.)	Report	Kelly 6'; Stanway 27', 66', 80+5'

Albena 1, Albena
Referee: Silvia Domingos (Portugal)
31 October 2014
14:00

Bulgaria	2–0	Moldova
Angelova 4' (pen.); Petrova 77'	Report

Kavarna Stadium, Kavarna
Referee: Justina Lavrenovaite (Lithuania)

==== Group 2 ====
Pos	Team	Pld	W	D	L	GF	GA	GD	Pts	Qualification
1	Finland	3	3	0	0	19	0	+19	9	Elite round
2	Poland	3	2	0	1	9	2	+7	6	Elite round
3	Bosnia and Herzegovina	3	1	0	2	1	13	−12	3	
4	Estonia (H)	3	0	0	3	0	14	−14	0	

Source: UEFA
Rules for classification: Qualification tiebreakers
(H) Hosts
17 October 2014
14:00

Poland	5–0	Estonia
Miłek 20', 29'; Botor 36'; Jędrzejewicz 57'; Turkiewicz 80+2'	Report

Kadriorg Stadium, Tallinn
Referee: Beatriz Gil (Spain)
17 October 2014
14:00

Finland	9–0	Bosnia and Herzegovina
Summanen 5' (pen.); Kröger 14', 40', 77', 80+2'; Ukkonen 20', 26', 31'; Kosunen 43'	Report

Rakvere Stadium, Rakvere
Referee: Elvira Nurmustafina (Kazakhstan)

19 October 2014
14:00

Poland	4–0	Bosnia and Herzegovina
Zawistowska 12'; Miłek 21', 31'; Fil 54'	Report

Rakvere Stadium, Rakvere
Referee: Ivana Martinčić (Croatia)
19 October 2014
14:00

Estonia	0–8	Finland
	Report	Rantala 3', 47', 56', 64'; Ukkonen 6', 43'; Räämet 44' (o.g.); Rantanen 58'

Kadriorg Stadium, Tallinn
Referee: Elvira Nurmustafina (Kazakhstan)

22 October 2014
14:00

Finland	2–0	Poland
Rantanen 22'; Kröger 80+1'	Report

Rakvere Stadium, Rakvere
Referee: Beatriz Gil (Spain)
22 October 2014
14:00

Bosnia and Herzegovina	1–0	Estonia
Tereštšenkova 72' (o.g.)	Report

Kadriorg Stadium, Tallinn
Referee: Ivana Martinčić (Croatia)

==== Group 3 ====
Pos	Team	Pld	W	D	L	GF	GA	GD	Pts	Qualification
1	Switzerland	3	3	0	0	10	1	+9	9	Elite round
2	Hungary (H)	3	2	0	1	5	4	+1	6	Elite round
3	Portugal	3	1	0	2	3	4	−1	3	
4	Azerbaijan	3	0	0	3	1	10	−9	0	

Source: UEFA
Rules for classification: Qualification tiebreakers
(H) Hosts
11 October 2014
13:30

Switzerland	5–0	Azerbaijan
Mégroz 8'; Surdez 11', 15'; Schürch 36'; Hoti 52'	Report

Bük, Bük
Referee: Julia-Stefanie Baier (Austria)
11 October 2014
13:30

Hungary	2–0	Portugal
Kocsán 34', 53'	Report

Király Sportcentre, Szombathely
Referee: Eliska Kramlova (Czech Republic)

13 October 2014
13:30

Switzerland	2–1	Portugal
Dubs 22'; Surdez 80+1'	Report	Cheganças 13'

Király Sportcentre, Szombathely
Referee: Dimitrina Milkova (Bulgaria)
13 October 2014
13:30

Azerbaijan	1–3	Hungary
Ozdemir 52'	Report	Magyarics 39', 71'; C. Krascsenics 77'

Bük, Bük
Referee: Eliska Kramlova (Czech Republic)

16 October 2014
13:30

Hungary	0–3	Switzerland
	Report	Felder 35'; Jenzer 57'; Dubs 80+1'

Király Sportcentre, Szombathely
Referee: Julia-Stefanie Baier (Austria)
16 October 2014
13:30

Portugal	2–0	Azerbaijan
Seca 40+1'; Marques 55'	Report

Bük, Bük
Referee: Dimitrina Milkova (Bulgaria)

==== Group 4 ====
Pos	Team	Pld	W	D	L	GF	GA	GD	Pts	Qualification
1	Republic of Ireland	3	2	1	0	5	1	+4	7	Elite round
2	Serbia (H)	3	1	2	0	6	3	+3	5	Elite round
3	Romania	3	0	2	1	4	6	−2	2	Elite round
4	Lithuania	3	0	1	2	4	9	−5	1	

Source: UEFA
Rules for classification: Qualification tiebreakers
(H) Hosts
17 October 2014
14:00

Republic of Ireland	2–0	Lithuania
McKevitt 12'; Finn 42'	Report

Gradski Stadium, Subotica
Referee: Virginie Derouaux (Belgium)
17 October 2014
14:00

Serbia	1–1	Romania
Kovačević 65'	Report	Golubović 8' (o.g.)

Backa Stadium, Subotica
Referee: Irina Turovskaya (Belarus)

19 October 2014
14:00

Republic of Ireland	2–0	Romania
Farrelly 18'; McKevitt 56'	Report

Backa Stadium, Subotica
Referee: Liudmyla Telbukh (Ukraine)
19 October 2014
14:00

Lithuania	1–4	Serbia
Gedminaitė 62'	Report	Poljak 55', 73'; Knežević 64'; Burkert 70'

Gradski Stadium, Subotica
Referee: Irina Turovskaya (Belarus)

22 October 2014
14:00

Romania	3–3	Lithuania
Indrei 8', 59', 71'	Report	Sarkanaitė 1'; Zabolotnaja 29'; Potapova 56'

Gradski Stadium, Subotica
Referee: Liudmyla Telbukh (Ukraine)
22 October 2014
14:00

Serbia	1–1	Republic of Ireland
Kovačević 54'	Report	Beirne 33'

Backa Stadium, Subotica
Referee: Virginie Derouaux (Belgium)

==== Group 5 ====
Pos	Team	Pld	W	D	L	GF	GA	GD	Pts	Qualification
1	Austria (H)	3	3	0	0	13	2	+11	9	Elite round
2	Czech Republic	3	2	0	1	6	3	+3	6	Elite round
3	Northern Ireland	3	1	0	2	3	10	−7	3	
4	Ukraine	3	0	0	3	6	13	−7	0	

Source: UEFA
Rules for classification: Qualification tiebreakers
(H) Hosts
18 October 2014
15:00

Czech Republic	4–2	Ukraine
Dubcová 29'; Stárová 39'; Dubcová 54' (pen.); Veselá 69'	Report	Kovtun 3'; Ruban 20' (pen.)

Sportzentrum, Trumau
Referee: Sarah Garratt (England)
18 October 2014
15:00

Austria	6–0	Northern Ireland
Baine 15' (o.g.); Kofler 36'; Klein 37', 44'; Pinther 51'; Krumböck 56'	Report

Lindabrunn Stadium, Enzesfeld-Lindabrunn
Referee: Vivian Peeters (Netherlands)

20 October 2014
11:00

Czech Republic	2–0	Northern Ireland
Dubcová 45'; Příkaská 72'	Report

Lindabrunn Stadium, Enzesfeld-Lindabrunn
Referee: Viola Raudziņa (Latvia)
20 October 2014
18:00

Ukraine	2–6	Austria
Kovtun 21'; Polyukhovych 37'	Report	Hartl 1'; Pinther 41', 52' (pen.), 71'; Krumböck 78'; Klein 80+4'

Sport- und Freizeitzentrum Traiskirchen, Traiskirchen
Referee: Vivian Peeters (Netherlands)

23 October 2014
15:15

Austria	1–0	Czech Republic
Mayr 6'	Report

Lindabrunn Stadium, Enzesfeld-Lindabrunn
Referee: Sarah Garratt (England)
23 October 2014
18:00

Northern Ireland	3–2	Ukraine
Connolly 21'; Bassett 24'; Orr 55'	Report	Ruban 40+2'; Fomych 43'

Sportzentrum, Trumau
Referee: Viola Raudziņa (Latvia)

==== Group 6 ====
Pos	Team	Pld	W	D	L	GF	GA	GD	Pts	Qualification
1	Scotland	3	3	0	0	15	1	+14	9	Elite round
2	Sweden	3	2	0	1	12	4	+8	6	Elite round
3	Croatia (H)	3	1	0	2	3	8	−5	3	
4	Montenegro	3	0	0	3	0	17	−17	0	

Source: UEFA
Rules for classification: Qualification tiebreakers
(H) Hosts
9 October 2014
11:00

Sweden	5–1	Croatia
Rulander 13'; Larsson 43'; Finndell 60'; Filekovic 67'; Strömblad 79'	Report	Tomić 18' (pen.)

Veli Jozc, Poreč
Referee: Agnieszka Plaskocinska (Poland)
9 October 2014
15:00

Scotland	9–0	Montenegro
Whyte 10', 37', 59'; Gallacher 22'; Cuthbert 26'; Hay 48'; Boyce 56', 73'; Brown 79'	Report

Veli Jozc, Poreč
Referee: Kseniya Goryacheva (Russia)

11 October 2014
11:00

Sweden	6–0	Montenegro
Rulander 22'; Wieder 39', 64', 65'; Larsson 45'; Korhonen 68'	Report

Veli Jozc, Poreč
Referee: Galiya Echeva (Bulgaria)
11 October 2014
15:00

Croatia	0–3	Scotland
	Report	Brown 12'; Hay 19'; Cuthbert 67'

Veli Jozc, Poreč
Referee: Kseniya Goryacheva (Russia)

14 October 2014
11:00

Montenegro	0–2	Croatia
	Report	Mihić 43', 47'

Stadion Lako, Novigrad
Referee: Galiya Echeva (Bulgaria)
14 October 2014
11:00

Scotland	3–1	Sweden
Cuthbert 19'; Boyce 49'; Kerr 54'	Report	Filekovic 65'

Veli Jozc, Poreč
Referee: Agnieszka Plaskocinska (Poland)

==== Group 7 ====
Pos	Team	Pld	W	D	L	GF	GA	GD	Pts	Qualification
1	Belgium	3	3	0	0	10	0	+10	9	Elite round
2	Belarus	3	2	0	1	8	2	+6	6	Elite round
3	Wales	3	1	0	2	3	7	−4	3	
4	Latvia (H)	3	0	0	3	0	12	−12	0	

Source: UEFA
Rules for classification: Qualification tiebreakers
(H) Hosts
6 October 2014
11:00

Wales	0–2	Belarus
	Report	Dranovskaya 30', 33'

Rīgas Hanzas vidusskola, Riga
Attendance: 20
Referee: Ivana Vlaić (Bosnia and Herzegovina)
6 October 2014
15:00

Belgium	3–0	Latvia
Wijnants 58'; De Schrijver 65'; Guns 80+2'	Report

Rīgas Hanzas vidusskola, Riga
Attendance: 30
Referee: Barbara Bollenberg (Austria)

8 October 2014
11:00

Belgium	2–0	Belarus
Soree 22'; Guns 37'	Report

Rīgas Hanzas vidusskola, Riga
Attendance: 30
Referee: Marta Frias Acedo (Spain)
8 October 2014
15:00

Latvia	0–3	Wales
	Report	Chivers 53', 70', 80+3'

Rīgas Hanzas vidusskola, Riga
Attendance: 75
Referee: Ivana Vlaić (Bosnia and Herzegovina)

11 October 2014
13:00

Wales	0–5	Belgium
	Report	Abdulai Toloba 6', 23'; Soree 12', 27'; Dhont 80+2'

Olaines pilsētas stadions, Olaine
Attendance: 55
Referee: Barbara Bollenberg (Austria)
11 October 2014
13:00

Belarus	6–0	Latvia
Yushko 6', 44'; Kakoshina 25'; Goncharova 63'; Stezhko 71', 76'	Report

Rīgas Hanzas vidusskola, Riga
Attendance: 39
Referee: Marta Frias Acedo (Spain)

==== Group 8 ====
Signe Bruun's eight goals against Kazakhstan equalled a competition record set by Vivianne Miedema against Kazakhstan as well in 2012.

Pos	Team	Pld	W	D	L	GF	GA	GD	Pts	Qualification
1	Denmark	3	3	0	0	23	0	+23	9	Elite round
2	Turkey	3	2	0	1	10	2	+8	6	Elite round
3	Macedonia (H)	3	1	0	2	1	15	−14	3	
4	Kazakhstan	3	0	0	3	0	17	−17	0	

Source: UEFA
Rules for classification: Qualification tiebreakers
(H) Hosts
16 October 2014
13:30

Denmark	10–0	Macedonia
Bruun 10', 26'; Klitgaard 12', 13', 20'; Møller Thomsen 33'; Lauridsen 64'; Abildå 75'; Frank 78' (pen.); Hymøller 80'	Report

FFM Training Centre, Skopje
Referee: Ifeoma Kulmala (Finland)
16 October 2014
13:30

Turkey	5–0	Kazakhstan
Civelek 40+2'; Hançar 54', 80'; Türkoğlu 58'; Arhan 80+2'	Report

Boris Trajkovski, Skopje
Referee: Aleksandra Česen (Slovenia)

18 October 2014
13:30

Denmark	11–0	Kazakhstan
Bruun 11', 21', 25', 27', 40', 44', 47', 71'; Struck 52'; Kjærsig Sunesen 68'; Frank 75'	Report

Boris Trajkovski, Skopje
Referee: Ruzanna Petrosyan (Armenia)
18 October 2014
13:30

Macedonia	0–5	Turkey
	Report	Arhan 7'; Kilinç 35'; Hançar 63'; Civelek 77'; Manya 79'

FFM Training Centre, Skopje
Referee: Aleksandra Česen (Slovenia)

21 October 2014
13:30

Turkey	0–2	Denmark
	Report	Frank 15'; Kjærsig Sunesen 60'

Boris Trajkovski, Skopje
Referee: Ifeoma Kulmala (Finland)
21 October 2014
13:30

Kazakhstan	0–1	Macedonia
	Report	Petrovska 77'

FFM Training Centre, Skopje
Referee: Ruzanna Petrosyan (Armenia)

==== Group 9 ====
Pos	Team	Pld	W	D	L	GF	GA	GD	Pts	Qualification
1	Italy	3	3	0	0	7	0	+7	9	Elite round
2	Norway	3	2	0	1	5	2	+3	6	Elite round
3	Greece	3	1	0	2	3	2	+1	3	
4	Faroe Islands (H)	3	0	0	3	0	11	−11	0	

Source: UEFA
Rules for classification: Qualification tiebreakers
(H) Hosts
25 September 2014
14:00

Italy	4–0	Faroe Islands
Serturini 3', 16', 29'; Pezzotta 31'	Report

Tórsvøllur, Tórshavn
Referee: Lois Otte (Belgium)
25 September 2014
19:00

Norway	1–0	Greece
Nautnes 5'	Report

Tórsvøllur, Tórshavn
Referee: Tania Fernandes Morais (Luxembourg)

27 September 2014
14:00

Norway	4–0	Faroe Islands
Kvernvolden 18'; Nautnes 29'; Willmann 33'; Døvle 69'	Report

Tórsvøllur, Tórshavn
Referee: Irena Velevackoska (Macedonia)
27 September 2014
19:00

Greece	0–1	Italy
	Report	Marinelli 45'

Tórsvøllur, Tórshavn
Referee: Lois Otte (Belgium)

30 September 2014
12:00

Italy	2–0	Norway
Peressotti 49'; Mascarello 58'	Report

Tórsvøllur, Tórshavn
Referee: Tania Fernandes Morais (Luxembourg)
30 September 2014
12:00

Faroe Islands	0–3	Greece
	Report	Chatzinikolaou 2', 52'; Gatsiou 74'

Svangaskarð, Toftir
Referee: Irena Velevackoska (Macedonia)

==== Group 10 ====
Pos	Team	Pld	W	D	L	GF	GA	GD	Pts	Qualification
1	Netherlands	3	2	1	0	7	3	+4	7	Elite round
2	Slovakia	3	2	0	1	4	3	+1	6	Elite round
3	Israel	3	1	0	2	2	4	−2	3	
4	Slovenia (H)	3	0	1	2	3	6	−3	1	

Source: UEFA
Rules for classification: Qualification tiebreakers
(H) Hosts
22 October 2014
15:00

Netherlands	3–0	Israel
Nouwen 19'; De Beer 30'; Van Velzen 38'	Report

ŠRC Bakovci Stadium, Bakovci
Referee: Lorraine Clark (Scotland)
22 October 2014
15:00

Slovenia	1–2	Slovakia
Kuštrin 36'	Report	Čeriová 8'; Mikolajová 52'

Sportni Park, Beltinci
Referee: Valentina Garoffolo (Italy)

24 October 2014
15:00

Netherlands	2–1	Slovakia
Kalma 14', 65'	Report	Šurnovská 80'

Sportni Park, Beltinci
Referee: Sabayel Gurbanova (Azerbaijan)
24 October 2014
15:00

Israel	2–0	Slovenia
Goor 59'; Hazan 67'	Report

ŠRC Bakovci Stadium, Bakovci
Referee: Valentina Garoffolo (Italy)

27 October 2014
14:00

Slovenia	2–2	Netherlands
Kolbl 17'; De Sanders 69' (o.g.)	Report	Nouwen 2'; De Sanders 46'

Sportni Park, Beltinci
Referee: Lorraine Clark (Scotland)
27 October 2014
14:00

Slovakia	1–0	Israel
Šurnovská 70' (pen.)	Report

ŠRC Bakovci Stadium, Bakovci
Referee: Sabayel Gurbanova (Azerbaijan)

=== Ranking of third-placed teams ===
To determine the best third-placed team from the qualifying round which advanced to the elite round, only the results of the third-placed teams against the first and second-placed teams in their group were taken into account.

Pos	Grp	Team	Pld	W	D	L	GF	GA	GD	Pts	Qualification
1	4	Romania	2	0	1	1	1	3	−2	1	Elite round
2	9	Greece	2	0	0	2	0	2	−2	0	
3	3	Portugal	2	0	0	2	1	4	−3	0	
4	10	Israel	2	0	0	2	0	4	−4	0	
5	1	Bulgaria	2	0	0	2	0	6	−6	0	
6	6	Croatia	2	0	0	2	1	8	−7	0	
7	7	Wales	2	0	0	2	0	7	−7	0	
8	5	Northern Ireland	2	0	0	2	0	8	−8	0	
9	2	Bosnia and Herzegovina	2	0	0	2	0	13	−13	0	
10	8	Macedonia	2	0	0	2	0	15	−15	0	

Source: UEFA
Rules for classification: 1) points; 2) goal difference; 3) number of goals scored; 4) disciplinary points; 5) drawing of lots.

== Elite round ==
=== Draw ===
The draw for the elite round was held at UEFA headquarters in Nyon, Switzerland on 19 November 2014 at 12:15 CET (UTC+1).

The teams were seeded according to their results in the qualifying round. Germany, France and Spain, which received byes to the elite round, were automatically seeded into Pot A. Each group contained one team from Pot A, one team from Pot B, one team from Pot C, and one team from Pot D. Teams from the same qualifying round group could not be drawn in the same group.

Pos	Grp	Team	Pld	W	D	L	GF	GA	GD	Pts	Seeding
1	—	Germany	0	0	0	0	0	0	0	0	Pot A
2	—	France	0	0	0	0	0	0	0	0	Pot A
3	—	Spain	0	0	0	0	0	0	0	0	Pot A
4	8	Denmark	3	3	0	0	23	0	+23	9	Pot A
5	2	Finland	3	3	0	0	19	0	+19	9	Pot A
6	1	England	3	3	0	0	18	1	+17	9	Pot A
7	6	Scotland	3	3	0	0	15	1	+14	9	Pot B
8	5	Austria	3	3	0	0	13	2	+11	9	Pot B
9	7	Belgium	3	3	0	0	10	0	+10	9	Pot B
10	3	Switzerland	3	3	0	0	10	1	+9	9	Pot B
11	9	Italy	3	3	0	0	7	0	+7	9	Pot B
12	10	Netherlands	3	2	1	0	7	3	+4	7	Pot B
13	4	Republic of Ireland	3	2	1	0	5	1	+4	7	Pot C
14	6	Sweden	3	2	0	1	12	4	+8	6	Pot C
15	8	Turkey	3	2	0	1	10	2	+8	6	Pot C
16	2	Poland	3	2	0	1	9	2	+7	6	Pot C
17	7	Belarus	3	2	0	1	8	2	+6	6	Pot C
18	1	Russia	3	2	0	1	9	5	+4	6	Pot C
19	5	Czech Republic	3	2	0	1	6	3	+3	6	Pot D
20	9	Norway	3	2	0	1	5	2	+3	6	Pot D
21	3	Hungary	3	2	0	1	5	4	+1	6	Pot D
22	10	Slovakia	3	2	0	1	4	3	+1	6	Pot D
23	4	Serbia	3	1	2	0	6	3	+3	5	Pot D
24	4	Romania	3	0	2	1	4	6	−2	2	Pot D

Source: UEFA
Rules for classification: 1) points; 2) goal difference; 3) number of goals scored; 4) fair play ranking; 5) drawing of lots.

=== Groups ===
Times up to 28 March 2015 were CET (UTC+1), thereafter times were CEST (UTC+2).

==== Group 1 ====
Pos	Team	Pld	W	D	L	GF	GA	GD	Pts	Qualification
1	Switzerland	3	3	0	0	16	1	+15	9	Final tournament
2	Serbia	3	1	0	2	4	10	−6	3	
3	Finland	3	1	0	2	3	7	−4	3	
4	Turkey (H)	3	1	0	2	2	7	−5	3	

Source: UEFA
Rules for classification: Qualification tiebreakers
(H) Hosts
11 April 2015
13:00

Finland	1–2	Turkey
Peltoniemi 62'	Report	Hançar 52', 69'

Tarsus Stadium, Tarsus
Referee: Sarah Garratt (England)
11 April 2015
13:00

Switzerland	8–1	Serbia
Surdez 4', 10', 26', 51'; Reuteler 47'; Stampfli 55'; Jenzer 78'; Lienhard 80+1'	Report	Filipović 40'

Adana 5 Ocak Stadium, Adana
Referee: Barbara Bollenberg (Austria)

13 April 2015
13:00

Finland	2–1	Serbia
Lassas 24'; Rantanen 80+4'	Report	Filipović 44'

Tarsus Stadium, Tarsus
Referee: Eliska Kramlova (Czech Republic)
13 April 2015
13:00

Turkey	0–4	Switzerland
	Report	Lienhard 7'; Surdez 18'; Mégroz 25'; Reuteler 44'

Adana 5 Ocak Stadium, Adana
Referee: Barbara Bollenberg (Austria)

16 April 2015
13:00

Switzerland	4–0	Finland
Reuteler 34'; Mégroz 47' (pen.); Surdez 53'; Lehmann 61'	Report

Adana 5 Ocak Stadium, Adana
Referee: Sarah Garratt (England)
16 April 2015
13:00

Serbia	2–0	Turkey
Frajtović 43'; Ivanović 74'	Report

Tarsus Stadium, Tarsus
Referee: Eliska Kramlova (Czech Republic)

==== Group 2 ====
Pos	Team	Pld	W	D	L	GF	GA	GD	Pts	Qualification
1	England	3	2	0	1	6	3	+3	6	Final tournament
2	Republic of Ireland (H)	3	1	2	0	2	0	+2	5	Final tournament
3	Netherlands	3	1	1	1	5	3	+2	4	
4	Hungary	3	0	1	2	2	9	−7	1	

Source: UEFA
Rules for classification: Qualification tiebreakers
(H) Hosts
9 April 2015
16:00

Netherlands	5–1	Hungary
Kalma 5', 27'; Van den Heuval 7', 34'; Altelaar 67'	Report	C. Krascsenics 76'

St Colman's Park, Cobh
Referee: Ifeoma Kulmala (Finland)
9 April 2015
20:00

England	0–2	Republic of Ireland
	Report	Doyle 15'; Noonan 34'

Turners Cross, Cork
Referee: Dimitrina Milkova (Bulgaria)

11 April 2015
16:00

Republic of Ireland	0–0	Netherlands
	Report

Turners Cross, Cork
Referee: Ifeoma Kulmala (Finland)
11 April 2015
19:00

England	4–1	Hungary
Kelly 12'; Patten 24'; Parker 48'; Allen 77'	Report	Kocsán 42'

St Colman's Park, Cobh
Referee: Ivana Projkovska (Macedonia)

14 April 2015
13:00

Netherlands	0–2	England
	Report	Wubben-Moy 2'; Stanway 70'

St Colman's Park, Cobh
Referee: Dimitrina Milkova (Bulgaria)
14 April 2015
13:00

Hungary	0–0	Republic of Ireland
	Report

Turners Cross, Cork
Referee: Ivana Projkovska (Macedonia)

==== Group 3 ====
Pos	Team	Pld	W	D	L	GF	GA	GD	Pts	Qualification
1	Germany	3	3	0	0	16	1	+15	9	Final tournament
2	Czech Republic	3	2	0	1	6	6	0	6	
3	Italy (H)	3	1	0	2	2	6	−4	3	
4	Belarus	3	0	0	3	1	12	−11	0	

Source: UEFA
Rules for classification: Qualification tiebreakers
(H) Hosts
9 April 2015
16:00

Germany	6–0	Belarus
Sanders 18', 61', 66'; Hipp 33'; Kardesler 45' (pen.); Dallmann 62'	Report

Stadio Artemio Franchi, Siena
Referee: Vivian Peeters (Netherlands)
9 April 2015
16:00

Italy	0–1	Czech Republic
	Report	Dubcová 4'

Stadio Comunale B. Bonelli, Montepulciano
Referee: Désirée Grundbacher (Switzerland)

11 April 2015
12:00

Germany	5–1	Czech Republic
Feldkamp 19'; Čížková 38' (o.g.); Gwinn 40'; Kardesler 68' (pen.); Sanders 73'	Report	Dubcová 79'

Stadio Comunale B. Bonelli, Montepulciano
Referee: Silvia Domingos (Portugal)
11 April 2015
16:30

Belarus	0–2	Italy
	Report	Serturini 40', 56'

Stadio Comunale B. Bonelli, Montepulciano
Referee: Désirée Grundbacher (Switzerland)

14 April 2015
15:00

Italy	0–5	Germany
	Report	Minge 4', 20', 34', 68'; Möller 65'

Stadio Artemio Franchi, Siena
Referee: Vivian Peeters (Netherlands)
14 April 2015
15:00

Czech Republic	4–1	Belarus
Szewieczková 65', 70', 73'; Ducháčková 80+6'	Report	Dranouskaya 8'

Stadio Comunale B. Bonelli, Montepulciano
Referee: Silvia Domingos (Portugal)

==== Group 4 ====
Pos	Team	Pld	W	D	L	GF	GA	GD	Pts	Qualification
1	Spain	3	3	0	0	12	0	+12	9	Final tournament
2	Belgium	3	2	0	1	6	4	+2	6	
3	Romania	3	1	0	2	5	12	−7	3	
4	Russia (H)	3	0	0	3	2	9	−7	0	

Source: UEFA
Rules for classification: Qualification tiebreakers
(H) Hosts
22 March 2015
10:00

Belgium	5–0	Romania
Asselberghs 4'; Moraru 14' (o.g.); Guns 31', 40+2'; Wijnants 46'	Report

Sputnik-Sport, Sochi
Referee: Ivana Vlaić (Bosnia and Herzegovina)
22 March 2015
14:00

Spain	3–0	Russia
Aleixandri López 25'; Menayo 54'; García Córdoba 67'	Report

Sputnik-Sport, Sochi
Referee: Henrikke Nervik (Norway)

24 March 2015
10:00

Spain	5–0	Romania
Guijarro 37'; Batlle 59'; Oroz 60', 62'; Montilla 66'	Report

Sputnik-Sport, Sochi
Referee: Elvira Nurmustafina (Kazakhstan)
24 March 2015
14:00

Russia	0–1	Belgium
	Report	De Priester 64'

Sputnik-Sport, Sochi
Referee: Ivana Vlaić (Bosnia and Herzegovina)

27 March 2015
14:00

Belgium	0–4	Spain
	Report	Oroz 2'; Montilla 37'; Guijarro 51' (pen.); Bonmati 74' (pen.)

Sochi Central Stadium, Sochi
Referee: Henrikke Nervik (Norway)
27 March 2015
14:00

Romania	5–2	Russia
Petre 37'; Ciolacu 42', 56', 69'; Meluță 73' (pen.)	Report	Bespalikova 26'; Drozdova 35' (pen.)

Sputnik-Sport, Sochi
Referee: Elvira Nurmustafina (Kazakhstan)

==== Group 5 ====
Pos	Team	Pld	W	D	L	GF	GA	GD	Pts	Qualification
1	Norway	3	2	1	0	5	3	+2	7	Final tournament
2	Sweden	3	1	2	0	3	2	+1	5	
3	Austria (H)	3	1	0	2	3	4	−1	3	
4	Denmark	3	0	1	2	1	3	−2	1	

Source: UEFA
Rules for classification: Qualification tiebreakers
(H) Hosts
11 April 2015
11:00

Denmark	1–1	Sweden
Abildå 26'	Report	Kullashi 54'

Stadion Lindabrunn, Enzesfeld-Lindabrunn
Referee: Viola Raudziņa (Latvia)
11 April 2015
18:00

Austria	2–3	Norway
Krumböck 27'; Pinther 80+2'	Report	Kvernvolden 50'; Løfshus 78'; Ellingsen 80' (pen.)

Voithplatz, St Pölten
Referee: Ivana Martinčić (Croatia)

13 April 2015
11:00

Denmark	0–1	Norway
	Report	Wilmann 25'

Stadion Lindabrunn, Enzesfeld-Lindabrunn
Referee: Beatriz Gil Gozalo (Spain)
13 April 2015
18:00

Sweden	1–0	Austria
Persson 78'	Report

Voithplatz, St Pölten
Referee: Ivana Martinčić (Croatia)

16 April 2015
18:00

Austria	1–0	Denmark
Pinther 34'	Report

Voithplatz, St Pölten
Referee: Viola Raudziņa (Latvia)
16 April 2015
18:00

Norway	1–1	Sweden
Persson 6' (o.g.)	Report	Kullashi 19'

Stadt Sportanlage, St Pölten
Referee: Beatriz Gil Gozalo (Spain)

==== Group 6 ====
Pos	Team	Pld	W	D	L	GF	GA	GD	Pts	Qualification
1	France	3	3	0	0	6	1	+5	9	Final tournament
2	Scotland	3	2	0	1	4	3	+1	6	
3	Poland (H)	3	1	0	2	2	3	−1	3	
4	Slovakia	3	0	0	3	0	5	−5	0	

Source: UEFA
Rules for classification: Qualification tiebreakers
(H) Hosts
23 March 2015
15:00

Scotland	2–0	Slovakia
Gallacher 11', 53'	Report

ZOS Bałtyk Koszalin, Koszalin
Referee: Lois Otte (Belgium)
23 March 2015
18:00

France	2–0	Poland
Katoto 72' (pen.), 77'	Report

MOSIR, Kołobrzeg
Referee: Graziella Pirriatore (Italy)

25 March 2015
15:00

Poland	0–1	Scotland
	Report	Cornet 65'

ZOS Bałtyk Koszalin, Koszalin
Referee: Lois Otte (Belgium)
25 March 2015
18:00

France	1–0	Slovakia
Ould Braham 46'	Report

MOSIR, Kołobrzeg
Referee: Melis Özçiğdem (Turkey)

28 March 2015
15:00

Scotland	1–3	France
Ould Braham 21' (o.g.)	Report	Katoto 25'; Ould Braham 38'; Boutaleb 39'

ZOS Bałtyk Koszalin, Koszalin
Referee: Graziella Pirriatore (Italy)
28 March 2015
15:00

Slovakia	0–2	Poland
	Report	Marszewska 24'; Zawistowska 69'

MOSIR, Kołobrzeg
Referee: Melis Özçiğdem (Turkey)

=== Ranking of second-placed teams ===
To determine the best second-placed team from the elite round which qualified for the final tournament, only the results of the second-placed teams against the first and third-placed teams in their group were taken into account.

Pos	Grp	Team	Pld	W	D	L	GF	GA	GD	Pts	Qualification
1	2	Republic of Ireland	2	1	1	0	2	0	+2	4	Final tournament
2	5	Sweden	2	1	1	0	2	1	+1	4	
3	4	Belgium	2	1	0	1	5	4	+1	3	
4	6	Scotland	2	1	0	1	2	3	−1	3	
5	3	Czech Republic	2	1	0	1	2	5	−3	3	
6	1	Serbia	2	0	0	2	2	10	−8	0	

Source: UEFA
Rules for classification: 1) points; 2) goal difference; 3) number of goals scored; 4) disciplinary points; 5) drawing of lots.

== Qualified teams ==
The following eight teams qualified for the final tournament.

Team	Qualified as	Qualified on	Previous appearances in tournament^{1}
Iceland	Hosts	20 March 2012	1 (2011)
Switzerland	Elite round Group 1 winners	16 April 2015	1 (2012)
England	Elite round Group 2 winners	14 April 2015	2 (2008, 2014)
Germany	Elite round Group 3 winners	14 April 2015	6 (**2008**, **2009**, 2010, 2011, **2012**, **2014**)
Spain	Elite round Group 4 winners	27 March 2015	5 (2009, **2010**, **2011**, 2013, 2014)
Norway	Elite round Group 5 winners	16 April 2015	1 (2009)
France	Elite round Group 6 winners	28 March 2015	5 (2008, 2009, 2011, 2012, 2014)
Republic of Ireland	Elite round best runners-up	14 April 2015	1 (2010)

^{1} Bold indicates champion for that year. Italic indicates host for that year.

== Top goalscorers ==
The following players scored four goals or more in the qualifying competition.

10 goals

- (Denmark) Signe Bruun

9 goals

- (Switzerland) Camille Surdez

7 goals

- (England) Georgia Stanway

6 goals

- (Austria) Viktoria Pinther

5 goals

- (Finland) Aino Kröger
- (Finland) Emilia Ukkonen
- (Italy) Annamaria Serturini
- (Turkey) Kader Hançar

4 goals

- (Belgium) Celien Guns
- (Czech Republic) Michela Dubcová
- (England) Chloe Kelly
- (Finland) Jutta Rantala
- (Germany) Janina Minge
- (Germany) Stefanie Sanders
- (Netherlands) Fenna Kalma
- (Poland) Klaudia Miłek
