= 2017 UEFA Women's Under-19 Championship qualification =

Tournament details
- Dates: Qualifying round: 8 September – 25 October 2016; Elite round: 4 April – 12 June 2017
- Teams: 45 (from 1 confederation)

Tournament statistics
- Matches played: 101
- Goals scored: 438 (4.34 per match)
- Top scorer: (Spain) Lucía García (11 goals)

The 2017 UEFA Women's Under-19 Championship qualifying competition was a women's under-19 football competition that determined the seven teams joining the automatically qualified hosts Northern Ireland in the 2017 UEFA Women's Under-19 Championship final tournament.

A total of 47 UEFA member national teams entered the qualifying competition. Players born on or after 1 January 1998 are eligible to participate.

== Format ==
The qualifying competition consists of two rounds:

- Qualifying round: Apart from France, England and Germany, which receive byes to the elite round as the teams with the highest seeding coefficient, the remaining 44 teams are drawn into 11 groups of four teams. Each group is played in single round-robin format at one of the teams selected as hosts after the draw. The 11 group winners and the 10 runners-up with the best record against the first and third-placed teams in their group advance to the elite round.
- Elite round: The 24 teams are drawn into six groups of four teams. Each group is played in single round-robin format at one of the teams selected as hosts after the draw. The six group winners and the runner-up with the best record against the first and third-placed teams in their group qualify for the final tournament.

=== Tiebreakers ===
The teams are ranked according to points (3 points for a win, 1 point for a draw, 0 points for a loss). If two or more teams are equal on points on completion of a mini-tournament, the following tie-breaking criteria are applied, in the order given, to determine the rankings (Regulations Articles 14.01 and 14.02):

1. Higher number of points obtained in the mini-tournament matches played among the teams in question;
2. Superior goal difference resulting from the mini-tournament matches played among the teams in question;
3. Higher number of goals scored in the mini-tournament matches played among the teams in question;
4. If, after having applied criteria 1 to 3, teams still have an equal ranking, criteria 1 to 3 are reapplied exclusively to the mini-tournament matches between the teams in question to determine their final rankings. If this procedure does not lead to a decision, criteria 5 to 9 apply;
5. Superior goal difference in all mini-tournament matches;
6. Higher number of goals scored in all mini-tournament matches;
7. If only two teams have the same number of points, and they are tied according to criteria 1 to 6 after having met in the last round of the mini-tournament, their rankings are determined by a penalty shoot-out (not used if more than two teams have the same number of points, or if their rankings are not relevant for qualification for the next stage).
8. Lower disciplinary points total based only on yellow and red cards received in the mini-tournament matches (red card = 3 points, yellow card = 1 point, expulsion for two yellow cards in one match = 3 points);
9. Higher position in the coefficient ranking list used for the qualifying round draw;
10. Drawing of lots.

To determine the ten best runners-up from the qualifying round and the best runner-up from the elite round, the results against the teams in fourth place are discarded. The following criteria are applied (Regulations Article 15.01):

1. Higher number of points;
2. Superior goal difference;
3. Higher number of goals scored;
4. Lower disciplinary points total based only on yellow and red cards received (red card = 3 points, yellow card = 1 point, expulsion for two yellow cards in one match = 3 points);
5. Higher position in the coefficient ranking list used for the qualifying round draw;
6. Drawing of lots.

== Qualifying round ==
=== Draw ===
The draw for the qualifying round was held on 13 November 2015, 09:55 CET (UTC+1), at the UEFA headquarters in Nyon, Switzerland.

The teams were seeded according to their coefficient ranking, calculated based on the following:

- 2013 UEFA Women's Under-19 Championship final tournament and qualifying competition (qualifying round and elite round)
- 2014 UEFA Women's Under-19 Championship final tournament and qualifying competition (qualifying round and elite round)
- 2015 UEFA Women's Under-19 Championship final tournament and qualifying competition (qualifying round and elite round)

Each group contained one team from Pot A, one team from Pot B, one team from Pot C, and one team from Pot D. For political reasons, Armenia and Azerbaijan (due to the disputed status of Nagorno-Karabakh), as well as Russia and Ukraine (due to the Russian military intervention in Ukraine), could not be drawn in the same group.

Final tournament hosts
Team	Coeff	Rank
**Northern Ireland**	4.667	—

Bye to elite round
Team	Coeff	Rank
**France**	14.000	1
**England**	14.000	2
**Germany**	13.667	3

Teams entering qualifying round

Pot A
Team	Coeff	Rank
**Spain**	12.000	4
Sweden	11.500	5
Norway	10.000	6
Denmark	9.833	7
Belgium	9.333	8
**Netherlands**	9.167	9
Finland	9.167	10
**Scotland**	8.833	11
Switzerland	8.000	12
Republic of Ireland	7.833	13
Russia	7.000	14

Pot B
Team	Coeff	Rank
**Italy**	6.500	15
Portugal	6.333	16
Czech Republic	6.167	17
Austria	6.000	18
Iceland	5.833	19
Serbia	5.167	20
Ukraine	4.833	21
Romania	4.333	22
Slovenia	4.167	23
Turkey	4.000	24
Hungary	4.000	25

Pot C
Team	Coeff	Rank
Poland	3.833	26
Croatia	3.833	27
Wales	3.667	28
Greece	3.667	29
Bosnia and Herzegovina	3.333	30
Slovakia	2.333	31
Moldova	2.000	32
Belarus	1.833	33
Cyprus	1.667	34
Faroe Islands	1.333	35
Azerbaijan	1.333	36

Pot D
Team	Coeff	Rank
Macedonia	1.333	37
Estonia	1.000	38
Bulgaria	1.000	39
Israel	0.000	40
Kazakhstan	0.000	41
Latvia	0.000	42
Lithuania	0.000	43
Montenegro	0.000	44
Georgia	0.000	45
Albania	0.000	46
Armenia	—	47

Notes

- Teams marked in **bold** have qualified for the final tournament.

Did not enter
Andorra
Gibraltar
Liechtenstein
Luxembourg
Malta
San Marino

=== Groups ===
The qualifying round must be played on the following FIFA International Match Calendar dates unless all four teams agree to play on another date:

- 12–20 September 2016
- 17–25 October 2016

All times are CEST (UTC+2).

==== Group 1 ====
Pos	Team	Pld	W	D	L	GF	GA	GD	Pts	Qualification
1	Poland (H)	3	3	0	0	8	0	+8	**9**	Elite round
2	Norway	3	2	0	1	15	2	+13	**6**	Elite round
3	Romania	3	1	0	2	7	9	−2	**3**	
4	Armenia	3	0	0	3	0	19	−19	**0**	

Source: UEFA
Rules for classification: Qualification tiebreakers
(H) Hosts
15 September 2016
16:00

Norway	8–0	Armenia
Nautnes 6', 17', 29'; Kvernvolden 16'; Rasmussen 42'; Haug 71', 90+1'; Sand 88'	Report

Stadion GOSiR Komorniki, Plewiska
Referee: Melis Özçiğdem (Turkey)
15 September 2016
16:00

Poland	2–0	Romania
Jędrzejewicz 47'; Ratajczyk 70'	Report

Stadion Amica, Wronki
Referee: Olga Tereshko (Belarus)

17 September 2016
16:00

Norway	0–2	Poland
	Report	Parczewska 35' (pen.); Grabowska 49'

Stadion GOSiR Komorniki, Plewiska
Referee: Ana Aguiar (Portugal)
17 September 2016
16:00

Romania	7–0	Armenia
Bartalis 23'; Petre 31'; Ambruș 40'; Ciolacu 51', 72'; Boroș 63', 75'	Report

Stadion Dyskobolia, Grodzisk Wielkopolski
Referee: Olga Tereshko (Belarus)

20 September 2016
14:00

Romania	0–7	Norway
	Report	Maanum 7'; Kvernvolden 25'; Wilmann 36'; Gered 41' (o.g.); Norheim 48', 74'; Ellingsen 59'

Stadion Dyskobolia, Grodzisk Wielkopolski
Referee: Ana Aguiar (Portugal)
20 September 2016
14:00

Armenia	0–4	Poland
	Report	Grabowska 22'; Woś 27'; Jędrzejewicz 77'; Olszewska 90+5'

Stadion Amica, Wronki
Referee: Melis Özçiğdem (Turkey)

==== Group 2 ====
Pos	Team	Pld	W	D	L	GF	GA	GD	Pts	Qualification
1	Republic of Ireland	3	3	0	0	14	0	+14	**9**	Elite round
2	Italy	3	2	0	1	10	2	+8	**6**	Elite round
3	Wales	3	1	0	2	2	8	−6	**3**	
4	Macedonia (H)	3	0	0	3	0	16	−16	**0**	

Source: UEFA
Rules for classification: Qualification tiebreakers
(H) Hosts
18 October 2016
14:30

Republic of Ireland	10–0	Macedonia
Kiernan 10', 45', 63', 74'; Prior 19', 58'; Finn 24'; Kavanagh 67', 90'; Ryan-Doyle 69'	Report

Training Centre Petar Miloševski, Skopje
Referee: Virginie Derouaux (Belgium)
18 October 2016
14:30

Wales	0–6	Italy
	Report	Serturini 12'; Del Stabile 33', 70', 84', 86'; Lancaster 76' (o.g.)

Boris Trajkovski Stadium, Skopje
Referee: Dimitrina Milkova (Bulgaria)

20 October 2016
14:30

Republic of Ireland	2–0	Wales
Kiernan 25', 46'	Report

Boris Trajkovski Stadium, Skopje
Referee: Tess Olofsson (Sweden)
20 October 2016
14:30

Italy	4–0	Macedonia
Serturini 7'; Cantore 70'; Santoro 74'; Caruso 85'	Report

Training Centre Petar Miloševski, Skopje
Referee: Dimitrina Milkova (Bulgaria)

23 October 2016
14:30

Italy	0–2	Republic of Ireland
	Report	Noonan 33'; Moloney 58'

Boris Trajkovski Stadium, Skopje
Referee: Tess Olofsson (Sweden)
23 October 2016
14:30

Macedonia	0–2	Wales
	Report	Kitanova 86' (o.g.); Chivers 90' (pen.)

Training Centre Petar Miloševski, Skopje
Referee: Virginie Derouaux (Belgium)

==== Group 3 ====
Pos	Team	Pld	W	D	L	GF	GA	GD	Pts	Qualification
1	Belgium	3	3	0	0	14	2	+12	**9**	Elite round
2	Austria	3	1	1	1	4	2	+2	**4**	
3	Belarus (H)	3	1	1	1	5	4	+1	**4**	
4	Lithuania	3	0	0	3	1	16	−15	**0**	

Source: UEFA
Rules for classification: Qualification tiebreakers
(H) Hosts
20 October 2016
15:00

Belarus	0–0	Austria
	Report

City Stadium, Orsha
Referee: Elvira Nurmustafina (Kazakhstan)
20 October 2016
18:00

Belgium	9–0	Lithuania
Van Belle 9'; Missipo 29', 78'; Minnaert 30', 53'; Abdulai Toloba 51'; Dhont 58'; Guns 72', 88'	Report

Spartak Stadium, Mogilev
Referee: Ivana Vlaić (Bosnia and Herzegovina)

22 October 2016
15:00

Belgium	3–1	Belarus
Gorniak 3' (pen.); Henneuse 19'; Asselberghs 90+3'	Report	Kazakevich 89' (pen.)

City Stadium, Orsha
Referee: Elvira Nurmustafina (Kazakhstan)
22 October 2016
18:00

Austria	3–0	Lithuania
Klein 33'; Pinther 36'; Pireci 67'	Report

Spartak Stadium, Mogilev
Referee: Eleni Antoniou (Greece)

25 October 2016
14:00

Austria	1–2	Belgium
Krumböck 50'	Report	Guns 23', 40'

Spartak Stadium, Mogilev
Referee: Eleni Antoniou (Greece)
25 October 2016
14:00

Lithuania	1–4	Belarus
Gedminaitė 61'	Report	Lodyga 13'; Kubichnaya 22', 87'; Zhitko 44'

City Stadium, Orsha
Referee: Ivana Vlaić (Bosnia and Herzegovina)

==== Group 4 ====
Pos	Team	Pld	W	D	L	GF	GA	GD	Pts	Qualification
1	Serbia	3	3	0	0	15	0	+15	**9**	Elite round
2	Scotland	3	2	0	1	19	3	+16	**6**	Elite round
3	Albania (H)	3	1	0	2	2	20	−18	**3**	
4	Cyprus	3	0	0	3	0	13	−13	**0**	

Source: UEFA
Rules for classification: Qualification tiebreakers
(H) Hosts
14 September 2016
12:00

Cyprus	0–3	Serbia
	Report	Poljak 17'; Savanović 66', 83'

Niko Dovana Stadium, Durrës
Referee: Cathrine Eide (Norway)
14 September 2016
14:00

Scotland	11–0	Albania
Cuthbert 3', 15', 30', 48', 63'; Hanson 32', 38'; Adams 34'; Kerr 67'; Cornet 87'; Boyce 90'	Report

Selman Stërmasi Stadium, Tirana
Referee: Valentina Garoffolo (Italy)

16 September 2016
12:00

Scotland	8–0	Cyprus
Gallacher 33', 61'; Whyte 56', 66'; Brown 64'; Boyce 69'; Cornet 79'; Kerr 80'	Report

Niko Dovana Stadium, Durrës
Referee: Kateryna Zora (Ukraine)
16 September 2016
14:00

Serbia	9–0	Albania
Mišeljić 25' (pen.); Savanović 28'; Filipović 71', 86', 87'; Ivanović 80', 88', 90+5'; Kovačević 84'	Report

Selman Stërmasi Stadium, Tirana
Referee: Cathrine Eide (Norway)

19 September 2016
14:00

Serbia	3–0 Awarded	Scotland
	Report

Niko Dovana Stadium, Durrës
Referee: Kateryna Zora (Ukraine)

The Serbia v Scotland match was not played as scheduled due to illness within the Scotland squad. The match was awarded by UEFA as a 3–0 win for Serbia due to Scotland's "refusal to play" the match.

19 September 2016
14:00

Albania	2–0	Cyprus
Koldashi 21', 34'	Report

Selman Stërmasi Stadium, Tirana
Referee: Valentina Garoffolo (Italy)

==== Group 5 ====
Pos	Team	Pld	W	D	L	GF	GA	GD	Pts	Qualification
1	Slovenia (H)	3	2	1	0	6	2	+4	**7**	Elite round
2	Russia	3	1	1	1	7	7	0	**4**	Elite round
3	Greece	3	1	0	2	3	6	−3	**3**	
4	Israel	3	0	2	1	1	2	−1	**2**	

Source: UEFA
Rules for classification: Qualification tiebreakers
(H) Hosts
8 September 2016
15:30

Russia	1–1	Israel
Voloshina 85' (pen.)	Report	Cabrera 64'

Bakovci Stadium, Bakovci
Referee: Rebecca Welch (England)
8 September 2016
15:30

Greece	0–2	Slovenia
	Report	Bratuša 45+1'; Pleterski 68'

Lendava Sports Park, Lendava
Referee: Ivana Martinčić (Croatia)

10 September 2016
15:30

Russia	4–2	Greece
Bespalikova 1', 82'; Zarubina 9'; Kuropatkina 50'	Report	Chatzinikolaou 73', 90+1' (pen.)

Bakovci Stadium, Bakovci
Referee: Elia Martínez (Spain)
10 September 2016
15:30

Slovenia	0–0	Israel
	Report

Lendava Sports Park, Lendava
Referee: Ivana Martinčić (Croatia)

13 September 2016
15:30

Slovenia	4–2	Russia
Kolbl 34', 57'; Godina 50'; Turk 54'	Report	Yakovleva 36'; Voloshina 86' (pen.)

Lendava Sports Park, Lendava
Referee: Elia Martínez (Spain)
13 September 2016
15:30

Israel	0–1	Greece
	Report	Giannou 65'

Bakovci Stadium, Bakovci
Referee: Rebecca Welch (England)

==== Group 6 ====
Pos	Team	Pld	W	D	L	GF	GA	GD	Pts	Qualification
1	Finland (H)	3	3	0	0	18	0	+18	**9**	Elite round
2	Iceland	3	2	0	1	15	3	+12	**6**	Elite round
3	Faroe Islands	3	1	0	2	2	13	−11	**3**	
4	Kazakhstan	3	0	0	3	0	19	−19	**0**	

Source: UEFA
Rules for classification: Qualification tiebreakers
(H) Hosts
15 September 2016
14:00

Finland	7–0	Kazakhstan
Ikonen 4'; Ketola 7', 11', 48'; Tulkki 32', 80'; Mikkola 87'	Report

Eerikkilä Areena, Tammela
Referee: Viola Raudziņa (Latvia)
15 September 2016
18:00

Faroe Islands	0–5	Iceland
	Report	Albertsdóttir 26', 36'; Pálsdóttir 42'; Thorisson 90'; G. Árnadóttir 90+4'

Eerikkilä Areena, Tammela
Referee: Andromachi Tsiofliki (Greece)

17 September 2016
12:00

Iceland	10–0	Kazakhstan
Pétursdóttir 41', 50', 80', 90+2'; Magnúsdóttir 52'; Albertsdóttir 63', 73', 85', 90+4'; Halldórsdóttir 66'	Report

Eerikkilä Areena, Tammela
Referee: Andromachi Tsiofliki (Greece)
17 September 2016
17:00

Finland	8–0	Faroe Islands
Tulkki 7', 18'; Peuhkurinen 15', 67', 81'; Rantala 28', 33'; Ketola 51' (pen.)	Report

Eerikkilä Areena, Tammela
Referee: Barbara Poxhofer (Austria)

20 September 2016
14:00

Iceland	0–3	Finland
	Report	Lehtola 15'; Ketola 32'; Ikonen 86'

Keskusliikuntapuisto, Kaarina
Referee: Barbara Poxhofer (Austria)
20 September 2016
14:00

Kazakhstan	0–2	Faroe Islands
	Report	Lakjuni 27'; Hummeland 79'

Eerikkilä Areena, Tammela
Referee: Viola Raudziņa (Latvia)

==== Group 7 ====
Pos	Team	Pld	W	D	L	GF	GA	GD	Pts	Qualification
1	Sweden	3	3	0	0	10	1	+9	**9**	Elite round
2	Portugal	3	2	0	1	5	1	+4	**6**	Elite round
3	Bosnia and Herzegovina (H)	3	1	0	2	2	8	−6	**3**	
4	Georgia	3	0	0	3	0	7	−7	**0**	

Source: UEFA
Rules for classification: Qualification tiebreakers
(H) Hosts
18 October 2016
14:00

Sweden	4–0	Georgia
Westin 17'; Strömblad 29'; Olofsson 62'; Ollerstam 86'	Report

Gradski stadion, Bijeljina
Referee: Rachel Cohen (Israel)
18 October 2016
14:00

Bosnia and Herzegovina	0–3	Portugal
	Report	Monteiro 13'; Cheganças 40' (pen.); Amado 64'

Stadion Etno Selo Stanišići, Bijeljina
Referee: Lois Otte (Belgium)

20 October 2016
14:00

Sweden	5–1	Bosnia and Herzegovina
Simonsson 31'; Lilja 56', 90+3'; Westin 66'; Hed 82'	Report	Medić 21'

Stadion Etno Selo Stanišići, Bijeljina
Referee: Sarah Garratt (England)
20 October 2016
14:00

Portugal	2–0	Georgia
Besugo 34'; Cheganças 58'	Report

Gradski stadion, Bijeljina
Referee: Lois Otte (Belgium)

23 October 2016
14:00

Portugal	0–1	Sweden
	Report	Hed 67'

Stadion Etno Selo Stanišići, Bijeljina
Referee: Sarah Garratt (England)
23 October 2016
14:00

Georgia	0–1	Bosnia and Herzegovina
	Report	Bagarić 90'

Gradski stadion, Bijeljina
Referee: Rachel Cohen (Israel)

==== Group 8 ====
Pos	Team	Pld	W	D	L	GF	GA	GD	Pts	Qualification
1	Spain	3	3	0	0	30	0	+30	**9**	Elite round
2	Ukraine	3	2	0	1	7	8	−1	**6**	Elite round
3	Azerbaijan (H)	3	1	0	2	5	9	−4	**3**	
4	Latvia	3	0	0	3	2	27	−25	**0**	

Source: UEFA
Rules for classification: Qualification tiebreakers
(H) Hosts
15 September 2016
13:00

Spain	18–0	Latvia
Oroz 25', 38', 90+3'; García 33', 36', 51', 70'; Guijarro 45', 65'; Bonmatí 61', 75', 84'; Menayo 71', 87'; Montilla 81'; Azcona 82', 90+2'; Ņikitina 90+1' (o.g.)	Report

Baku National Stadium 2, Baku
Attendance: 10
Referee: Chryso Georgiou (Cyprus)
15 September 2016
17:00

Azerbaijan	1–2	Ukraine
Bakarandze 13'	Report	Rybalkina 26'; Shevchuk 62'

Baku National Stadium, Baku
Attendance: 80
Referee: Cristina Bujor (Romania)

17 September 2016
09:00

Spain	7–0	Azerbaijan
Sierra 24', 58', 77'; García 31', 85'; Bonmatí 56'; Guijarro 61'	Report

Baku National Stadium, Baku
Attendance: 20
Referee: Graziella Pirriatore (Italy)
17 September 2016
13:00

Ukraine	5–2	Latvia
Polyukhovych 36'; Kumeda 57'; Shevchuk 63'; Hryb 81', 90+2'	Report	Krūmiņa 26'; Štube 90+1'

Baku National Stadium 2, Baku
Attendance: 10
Referee: Cristina Bujor (Romania)

20 September 2016
17:00

Ukraine	0–5	Spain
	Report	García 31'; Montagut 41'; Mérida 63'; Portales 67'; Oroz 84'

Baku National Stadium 2, Baku
Attendance: 50
Referee: Graziella Pirriatore (Italy)
20 September 2016
17:00

Latvia	0–4	Azerbaijan
	Report	M. Ozdemir 15', 50'; Mollayeva 27'; Mammadaliyeva 44'

Dalga Arena, Baku
Attendance: 30
Referee: Chryso Georgiou (Cyprus)

==== Group 9 ====
Pos	Team	Pld	W	D	L	GF	GA	GD	Pts	Qualification
1	Czech Republic	3	2	1	0	19	3	+16	**7**	Elite round
2	Switzerland	3	2	1	0	17	3	+14	**7**	Elite round
3	Croatia	3	1	0	2	2	17	−15	**3**	
4	Estonia (H)	3	0	0	3	1	16	−15	**0**	

Source: UEFA
Rules for classification: Qualification tiebreakers
(H) Hosts
18 October 2016
14:00

Croatia	0–7 Awarded	Czech Republic
	Report	Veselá 12', 22'; Skálová 30'; Dubcová 42' (pen.), 49', 65'; Vojtková 64'

Kadriorg Stadium, Tallinn
Referee: Yuliya Larionova (Azerbaijan)

The Croatia v Czech Republic match was completed with a 0–7 scoreline before a default victory was awarded.

18 October 2016
17:00

Switzerland	5–0	Estonia
Surdez 44'; Lehmann 50'; Ahmedova 66' (o.g.); Schegg 71'; Mégroz 82'	Report

A. Le Coq Arena, Tallinn
Referee: Cheryl Foster (Wales)

20 October 2016
14:00

Switzerland	9–0	Croatia
Lehmann 10', 37', 54'; Schegg 11', 49'; Hamidi 45'; Mégroz 45+1', 79' (pen.); Surdez 80'	Report

Kadriorg Stadium, Tallinn
Referee: Tania Fernandes Morais (Luxembourg)
20 October 2016
17:00

Czech Republic	9–0	Estonia
Ducháčková 15'; Čížková 23', 90+2'; Dubcová 34'; Janíková 54'; Karasová 68', 70'; Skálová 69', 75'	Report

A. Le Coq Arena, Tallinn
Referee: Yuliya Larionova (Azerbaijan)

23 October 2016
14:00

Czech Republic	3–3	Switzerland
Veselá 20'; Klímová 24'; Dubcová 60'	Report	Lehmann 13'; Mégroz 31'; Reuteler 41'

Kadriorg Stadium, Tallinn
Referee: Tania Fernandes Morais (Luxembourg)
23 October 2016
14:00

Estonia	1–2	Croatia
Pušelj Drezga 29' (o.g.)	Report	Schafer-Hansen 43'; Balić 65'

A. Le Coq Arena, Tallinn
Referee: Cheryl Foster (Wales)

==== Group 10 ====
Pos	Team	Pld	W	D	L	GF	GA	GD	Pts	Qualification
1	Netherlands	3	3	0	0	11	0	+11	**9**	Elite round
2	Turkey	3	2	0	1	4	1	+3	**6**	Elite round
3	Bulgaria (H)	3	1	0	2	1	9	−8	**3**	
4	Moldova	3	0	0	3	0	6	−6	**0**	

Source: UEFA
Rules for classification: Qualification tiebreakers
(H) Hosts
19 October 2016
13:00

Netherlands	6–0	Bulgaria
Noordam 32', 35', 38'; Weerden 45+2'; Sabajo 82'; De Sanders 86'	Report

Albena Stadium, Albena
Referee: Knarik Grigoryan (Armenia)
19 October 2016
13:00

Moldova	0–1	Turkey
	Report	Koçer 70'

Stadion Balchik, Balchik
Referee: Désirée Grundbacher (Switzerland)

21 October 2016
13:00

Netherlands	4–0	Moldova
Sabajo 37', 43'; Kenton 59'; Van Dooren 69'	Report

Stadion Balchik, Balchik
Referee: Julia-Stefanie Baier (Austria)
21 October 2016
13:00

Turkey	3–0	Bulgaria
Civelek 45+1'; Türkoğlu 59'; Koçer 67'	Report

Albena Stadium, Albena
Referee: Désirée Grundbacher (Switzerland)

24 October 2016
13:00

Turkey	0–1	Netherlands
	Report	Weerden 7'

Stadion Balchik, Balchik
Referee: Julia-Stefanie Baier (Austria)
24 October 2016
13:00

Bulgaria	1–0	Moldova
Petrova 90+2'	Report

Albena Stadium, Albena
Referee: Knarik Grigoryan (Armenia)

==== Group 11 ====
Pos	Team	Pld	W	D	L	GF	GA	GD	Pts	Qualification
1	Hungary	3	2	1	0	9	1	+8	**7**	Elite round
2	Denmark	3	2	0	1	17	3	+14	**6**	Elite round
3	Slovakia	3	1	1	1	6	13	−7	**4**	
4	Montenegro (H)	3	0	0	3	2	17	−15	**0**	

Source: UEFA
Rules for classification: Qualification tiebreakers
(H) Hosts
20 October 2016
13:00

Denmark	7–0	Montenegro
Møller Thomsen 23'; Nielsen 43', 57'; Gejl 44'; Meldgaard Petersen 60'; Bruun 63', 87'	Report

Stadion pod Malim brdom, Petrovac
Referee: Nelli Stepanyan (Armenia)
20 October 2016
13:00

Slovakia	1–1	Hungary
Sluková 86'	Report	Krascsenics 66'

Camp FSCG, Podgorica
Referee: Marta Huerta de Aza (Spain)

22 October 2016
13:00

Denmark	10–1	Slovakia
Gejl 10'; Møller 38', 42', 74'; Bruun 48' (pen.), 83'; K. Holmgaard 51', 80'; Svava 67'; Frank 90'	Report	Fabová 30'

Camp FSCG, Podgorica
Referee: Justina Lavrenovaitė (Lithuania)
22 October 2016
13:00

Hungary	6–0	Montenegro
Gelb 15', 43'; Krascsenics 19'; Csigi 54'; Gruber 64', 66'	Report

Grbalj Training Stadium, Budva
Referee: Marta Huerta De Aza (Spain)

25 October 2016
13:00

Hungary	2–0	Denmark
Gelb 70'; Süle 73'	Report

Camp FSCG, Podgorica
Referee: Justina Lavrenovaitė (Lithuania)
25 October 2016
13:00

Montenegro	2–4	Slovakia
Vraneš 36'; Stanović 44'	Report	Šurnovská 22'; Mikolajová 70', 71'; Fabová 82'

Stadion pod Malim brdom, Petrovac
Referee: Nelli Stepanyan (Armenia)

=== Ranking of second-placed teams ===
To determine the ten best second-placed teams from the qualifying round which advance to the elite round, only the results of the second-placed teams against the first and third-placed teams in their group are taken into account.

Pos	Grp	Team	Pld	W	D	L	GF	GA	GD	Pts	Qualification
1	9	Switzerland	2	1	1	0	12	3	+9	4	Elite round
2	4	Scotland	2	1	0	1	11	3	+8	3	Elite round
3	11	Denmark	2	1	0	1	10	3	+7	3	Elite round
4	1	Norway	2	1	0	1	7	2	+5	3	Elite round
5	2	Italy	2	1	0	1	6	2	+4	3	Elite round
6	6	Iceland	2	1	0	1	5	3	+2	3	Elite round
7	7	Portugal	2	1	0	1	3	1	+2	3 (Note: Tie broken by disciplinary points.)	Elite round
8	10	Turkey	2	1	0	1	3	1	+2	3	Elite round
9	5	Russia	2	1	0	1	6	6	0	3	Elite round
10	8	Ukraine	2	1	0	1	2	6	−4	3	Elite round
11	3	Austria	2	0	1	1	1	2	−1	1	

Source: UEFA
Rules for classification: 1) points; 2) goal difference; 3) goals scored; 4) disciplinary points; 5) coefficient; 6) drawing of lots.

== Elite round ==
=== Draw ===
The draw for the elite round was held on 11 November 2016, 11:00 CET (UTC+1), at the UEFA headquarters in Nyon, Switzerland.

The teams were seeded according to their results in the qualifying round. France, England and Germany, which received byes to the elite round, were automatically seeded into Pot A. Each group contained one team from Pot A, one team from Pot B, one team from Pot C, and one team from Pot D. Teams from the same qualifying round group could not be drawn in the same group.

Pos	Grp	Team	Pld	W	D	L	GF	GA	GD	Pts	Seeding
1	—	France	0	0	0	0	0	0	0	0	Pot A
2	—	England	0	0	0	0	0	0	0	0	Pot A
3	—	Germany	0	0	0	0	0	0	0	0	Pot A
4	8	Spain	3	3	0	0	30	0	+30	9	Pot A
5	6	Finland	3	3	0	0	18	0	+18	9	Pot A
6	4	Serbia	3	3	0	0	15	0	+15	9	Pot A
7	2	Republic of Ireland	3	3	0	0	14	0	+14	9	Pot B
8	3	Belgium	3	3	0	0	14	2	+12	9	Pot B
9	10	Netherlands	3	3	0	0	11	0	+11	9	Pot B
10	7	Sweden	3	3	0	0	10	1	+9	9	Pot B
11	1	Poland	3	3	0	0	8	0	+8	9	Pot B
12	9	Czech Republic	3	2	1	0	19	3	+16	7	Pot B
13	9	Switzerland	3	2	1	0	17	3	+14	7	Pot C
14	11	Hungary	3	2	1	0	9	1	+8	7	Pot C
15	5	Slovenia	3	2	1	0	6	2	+4	7	Pot C
16	4	Scotland	3	2	0	1	19	3	+16	6	Pot C
17	11	Denmark	3	2	0	1	17	3	+14	6	Pot C
18	1	Norway	3	2	0	1	15	2	+13	6	Pot C
19	6	Iceland	3	2	0	1	15	3	+12	6	Pot D
20	2	Italy	3	2	0	1	10	2	+8	6	Pot D
21	7	Portugal	3	2	0	1	5	1	+4	6	Pot D
22	10	Turkey	3	2	0	1	4	1	+3	6	Pot D
23	8	Ukraine	3	2	0	1	7	8	−1	6	Pot D
24	5	Russia	3	1	1	1	7	7	0	4	Pot D

Source: UEFA
Rules for classification: 1) points; 2) goal difference; 3) goals scored; 4) disciplinary points; 5) coefficient; 6) drawing of lots.

=== Groups ===
The elite round must be played on the following FIFA International Match Calendar dates unless all four teams agree to play on another date:

- 3–11 April 2017
- 5–13 June 2017

All times are CEST (UTC+2).

==== Group 1 ====
Pos	Team	Pld	W	D	L	GF	GA	GD	Pts	Qualification
1	Spain	3	3	0	0	9	2	+7	9	Final tournament
2	Belgium	3	2	0	1	7	3	+4	6	
3	Hungary (H)	3	1	0	2	1	6	−5	3	
4	Russia	3	0	0	3	1	7	−6	0	

Source: UEFA
Rules for classification: Qualification tiebreakers
(H) Hosts
26 May 2017
16:00

Spain	3–1	Russia
García 36' (pen.); Bonmatí 45'; Guijarro 47'	Report	Kuropatkina 64'

Városi Stadion, Dabas
Referee: Solen Dallongeville (France)
26 May 2017
16:00

Hungary	0–3	Belgium
	Report	Guns 30', 65'; Dhont 67'

Hidegkuti Nándor Stadion, Budapest
Referee: Cheryl Foster (Wales)

28 May 2017
16:00

Spain	3–0	Hungary
Egurrola 27'; García 35'; Marcos Moral 78'	Report

Hidegkuti Nándor Stadion, Budapest
Referee: Julia-Stefanie Baier (Austria)
28 May 2017
16:00

Belgium	3–0 Awarded	Russia
Guns 14'; Abdulai Toloba 32'; Dhont 66'	Report

Városi Stadion, Dabas
Referee: Cheryl Foster (Wales)

The Belgium v Russia match was completed with a 3–0 scoreline before a default victory was awarded.

31 May 2017
16:00

Belgium	1–3	Spain
Dhont 90+2'	Report	García 48', 71'; Ramos 54'

Városi Stadion, Dabas
Referee: Julia-Stefanie Baier (Austria)
31 May 2017
16:00

Russia	0–1	Hungary
	Report	Krascsenics 6'

Hidegkuti Nándor Stadion, Budapest
Referee: Solen Dallongeville (France)

==== Group 2 ====
Pos	Team	Pld	W	D	L	GF	GA	GD	Pts	Qualification
1	England	3	3	0	0	12	0	+12	9	Final tournament
2	Denmark	3	2	0	1	10	2	+8	6	
3	Turkey (H)	3	0	1	2	2	10	−8	1	
4	Czech Republic	3	0	1	2	2	14	−12	1	

Source: UEFA
Rules for classification: Qualification tiebreakers
(H) Hosts
5 April 2017
11:00

England	3–0	Turkey
Cross 19'; Brazil 22'; Stanway 77'	Report

Arslan Zeki Demirci Spor Kompleksi – Emir Hotels 1, Manavgat
Referee: María Dolores Martinez Madrona (Spain)
5 April 2017
14:30

Denmark	5–0	Czech Republic
Gejl 11', 16'; Møller 33' (pen.); Hovmark 64', 83'	Report

Arslan Zeki Demirci Spor Kompleksi – Emir Hotels 2, Manavgat
Referee: Olga Tereshko (Belarus)

7 April 2017
11:00

England	2–0	Denmark
Finnigan 48'; Stanway 80'	Report

Arslan Zeki Demirci Spor Kompleksi – Emir Hotels 1, Manavgat
Referee: Lois Otte (Belgium)
7 April 2017
14:30

Czech Republic	2–2	Turkey
Kodadová 9'; Skálová 90+1'	Report	Civelek 39', 57'

Arslan Zeki Demirci Spor Kompleksi – Emir Hotels 2, Manavgat
Referee: Olga Tereshko (Belarus)

10 April 2017
14:30

Czech Republic	0–7	England
	Report	Rouse 18', 38', 39'; Dean 22', 90'; Stanway 26'; Cross 67'

Arslan Zeki Demirci Spor Kompleksi – Emir Hotels 2, Manavgat
Referee: Lois Otte (Belgium)
10 April 2017
14:30

Turkey	0–5	Denmark
	Report	Holt Andersen 9', 72'; Hovmark 44', 56'; Møller 54'

Arslan Zeki Demirci Spor Kompleksi – Emir Hotels 1, Manavgat
Referee: María Dolores Martinez Madrona (Spain)

==== Group 3 ====
Pos	Team	Pld	W	D	L	GF	GA	GD	Pts	Qualification
1	Netherlands (H)	3	2	1	0	10	0	+10	7	Final tournament
2	France	3	2	1	0	7	1	+6	7	Final tournament
3	Portugal	3	0	1	2	2	9	−7	1	
4	Slovenia	3	0	1	2	1	10	−9	1	

Source: UEFA
Rules for classification: Qualification tiebreakers
(H) Hosts
6 April 2017
17:00

France	3–1	Portugal
Boussaha 70'; Fercocq 80'; De Almeida 87'	Report	Ferreira Silva 56'

Sportpark Kerschoten, Apeldoorn
Referee: Irina Lyussina (Kazakhstan)
6 April 2017
19:30

Slovenia	0–5	Netherlands
	Report	Doejaaren 9'; Weerden 42'; Smits 45+4', 53', 72' (pen.)

Sportpark Puttereng, Putten
Referee: Tess Olofsson (Sweden)

8 April 2017
13:00

France	4–0	Slovenia
Diop 31'; Boussaha 36'; Pierel 42' (pen.), 56'	Report

Sportpark Puttereng, Putten
Referee: Justina Lavrenovaite (Lithuania)
8 April 2017
16:00

Netherlands	5–0	Portugal
Smits 37', 82'; Van Deursen 62'; Sabajo 66', 79'	Report

Sportpark Kerschoten, Apeldoorn
Referee: Tess Olofsson (Sweden)

11 April 2017
19:00

Netherlands	0–0	France
	Report

Sportpark Puttereng, Putten
Referee: Justina Lavrenovaite (Lithuania)
11 April 2017
19:00

Portugal	1–1	Slovenia
Besugo 24'	Report	Kolbl 90+1'

Sportpark Kerschoten, Apeldoorn
Referee: Irina Lyussina (Kazakhstan)

==== Group 4 ====
Pos	Team	Pld	W	D	L	GF	GA	GD	Pts	Qualification
1	Scotland	3	3	0	0	9	2	+7	9	Final tournament
2	Finland	3	2	0	1	9	3	+6	6	
3	Republic of Ireland (H)	3	1	0	2	4	5	−1	3	
4	Ukraine	3	0	0	3	0	12	−12	0	

Source: UEFA
Rules for classification: Qualification tiebreakers
(H) Hosts
4 April 2017
16:00

Finland	5–0	Ukraine
Tulkki 17', 47'; Rantala 26', 77'; Ketola 54'	Report

Jackman Park, Limerick
Referee: Hristiana Guteva (Bulgaria)
4 April 2017
20:00

Scotland	2–1	Republic of Ireland
Cuthbert 14', 90+7' (pen.)	Report	Farrelly 51'

Markets Field, Limerick
Referee: Angelika Söder (Germany)

6 April 2017
16:00

Finland	1–2	Scotland
Tulkki 56'	Report	Boyce 48'; Cuthbert 71' (pen.)

Jackman Park, Limerick
Referee: Ivana Martinčić (Croatia)
6 April 2017
20:00

Republic of Ireland	2–0	Ukraine
McCartan 1'; Noonan 89'	Report

Markets Field, Limerick
Referee: Angelika Soeder (Germany)

9 April 2017
15:00

Republic of Ireland	1–3	Finland
Prior 88'	Report	Ketola 26'; Summanen 57'; Rantala 61'

Markets Field, Limerick
Referee: Ivana Martinčić (Croatia)
9 April 2017
15:00

Ukraine	0–5	Scotland
	Report	Boyce 13', 60'; Cuthbert 34', 61'; Cornet 58'

Jackman Park, Limerick
Referee: Hristiana Guteva (Bulgaria)

==== Group 5 ====
Pos	Team	Pld	W	D	L	GF	GA	GD	Pts	Qualification
1	Italy	3	2	0	1	5	3	+2	6	Final tournament
2	Norway (H)	3	1	1	1	5	4	+1	4	
3	Sweden	3	1	1	1	4	4	0	4	
4	Serbia	3	1	0	2	2	5	−3	3	

Source: UEFA
Rules for classification: Qualification tiebreakers
(H) Hosts
5 April 2017
14:00

Serbia	0–3	Italy
	Report	Caruso 16'; Del Stabile 68'; Glionna 82'

Sarpsborg Stadion, Sarpsborg
Referee: Karoline Wacker (Germany)
5 April 2017
18:30

Norway	2–2	Sweden
Norheim 15'; Syrstad Engen 30'	Report	Kullashi 48', 90+2'

Sarpsborg Stadion, Sarpsborg
Referee: Eleni Antoniou (Greece)

7 April 2017
14:00

Sweden	2–0	Italy
Piazza 35' (o.g.); Kullashi 54'	Report

Fredrikstad Stadion, Fredrikstad
Referee: Eleni Antoniou (Greece)
7 April 2017
18:30

Serbia	0–2	Norway
	Report	Norheim 5', 54'

Fredrikstad Stadion, Fredrikstad
Referee: Vivian Peeters (Netherlands)

10 April 2017
16:00

Sweden	0–2	Serbia
	Report	Filipović 63'; Ivanović 80'

Fredrikstad Stadion, Fredrikstad
Referee: Vivian Peeters (Netherlands)
10 April 2017
16:00

Italy	2–1	Norway
Glionna 78'; Mascarello 90+3' (pen.)	Report	Suphellen 21'

Sarpsborg Stadion, Sarpsborg
Referee: Karoline Wacker (Germany)

==== Group 6 ====
Pos	Team	Pld	W	D	L	GF	GA	GD	Pts	Qualification
1	Germany (H)	3	3	0	0	13	1	+12	9	Final tournament
2	Poland	3	1	1	1	3	8	−5	4	
3	Switzerland	3	0	2	1	2	4	−2	2	
4	Iceland	3	0	1	2	3	8	−5	1	

Source: UEFA
Rules for classification: Qualification tiebreakers
(H) Hosts
7 June 2017
16:30

Germany	4–0	Iceland
Bühl 8'; Minge 52'; Gwinn 55'; Freigang 88'	Report

Friedensstadion, Halberstadt
Referee: Valentina Finzi (Italy)
7 June 2017
18:00

Switzerland	0–0	Poland
	Report

Stadion im Sport- und Freizeitzentrum, Sandersdorf-Brehna
Referee: Dimitrina Milkova (Bulgaria)

9 June 2017
16:30

Germany	2–0	Switzerland
Gwinn 60' (pen.); Fellhauer 62'	Report

Friedensstadion, Halberstadt
Referee: Viola Raudziņa (Latvia)
9 June 2017
19:45

Poland	2–1	Iceland
Lefeld 6'; Jędrzejewicz 81'	Report	Halldórsdóttir 58'

Friedensstadion, Halberstadt
Referee: Dimitrina Milkova (Bulgaria)

12 June 2017
12:00

Poland	1–7	Germany
Grabowska 53'	Report	Freigang 24', 56', 59'; Gwinn 28', 82' (pen.); Siems 43'; Pawollek 90+4'

Stadion im Sport- und Freizeitzentrum, Sandersdorf-Brehna
Referee: Viola Raudziņa (Latvia)
12 June 2017
12:00

Iceland	2–2	Switzerland
Halldórsdóttir 4'; K. Árnadóttir 89'	Report	Surdez 29', 68'

Friedensstadion, Halberstadt
Referee: Valentina Finzi (Italy)

=== Ranking of second-placed teams ===
To determine the best second-placed team from the elite round which qualify for the final tournament, only the results of the second-placed teams against the first and third-placed teams in their group are taken into account.

Pos	Grp	Team	Pld	W	D	L	GF	GA	GD	Pts	Qualification
1	3	France	2	1	1	0	3	1	+2	4	Final tournament
2	2	Denmark	2	1	0	1	5	2	+3	3	
3	4	Finland	2	1	0	1	4	3	+1	3 (Note: Tie broken by disciplinary points.)	
4	1	Belgium	2	1	0	1	4	3	+1	3	
5	5	Norway	2	0	1	1	3	4	−1	1	
6	6	Poland	2	0	1	1	1	7	−6	1	

Source: UEFA
Rules for classification: 1) points; 2) goal difference; 3) goals scored; 4) disciplinary points; 5) coefficient; 6) drawing of lots.

== Qualified teams ==
The following eight teams qualify for the final tournament.

Team	Qualified as	Qualified on	Previous appearances in tournament^{1} only U-19 era (since 2002)
Northern Ireland	Hosts	26 January 2015	0 (debut)
Spain	Elite round Group 1 winners	31 May 2017	11 (2002, 2003, **2004**, 2007, 2008, 2010, 2011, 2012, 2014, 2015, 2016)
England	Elite round Group 2 winners	7 April 2017	11 (2002, 2003, 2005, 2007, 2008, **2009**, 2010, 2012, 2013, 2014, 2015)
Netherlands	Elite round Group 3 winners	11 April 2017	6 (2003, 2006, 2010, 2011, **2014**, 2016)
Scotland	Elite round Group 4 winners	6 April 2017	4 (2005, 2008, 2010, 2014)
Italy	Elite round Group 5 winners	10 April 2017	5 (2003, 2004, **2008**, 2010, 2011)
Germany	Elite round Group 6 winners	12 June 2017	13 (**2002**, 2003, 2004, 2005, **2006**, **2007**, 2008, 2009, 2010, **2011**, 2013, 2015, 2016)
France	Elite round best runners-up	9 June 2017	12 (2002, **2003**, 2004, 2005, 2006, 2007, 2008, 2009, **2010**, **2013**, 2015, **2016**)

^{1} Bold indicates champion for that year. Italic indicates host for that year.

== Top goalscorers ==
The following players scored four goals or more in the qualifying competition:

11 goals

- (Spain) Lucía García

10 goals

- (Scotland) Erin Cuthbert

7 goals

- (Belgium) Celien Guns
- (Finland) Juuli Ketola
- (Finland) Emmaliina Tulkki

6 goals

- (Iceland) Agla María Albertsdóttir
- (Republic of Ireland) Leanne Kiernan

5 goals

- (Czech Republic) Kamila Dubcová
- (Denmark) Caroline Møller
- (Finland) Jutta Rantala
- (Italy) Sofia Del Stabile
- (Netherlands) Quinty Sabajo
- (Netherlands) Joëlle Smits
- (Norway) Andrea Norheim
- (Scotland) Carla Boyce
- (Spain) Aitana Bonmatí
- (Switzerland) Alisha Lehmann

4 goals

- (Belgium) Elena Dhont
- (Czech Republic) Denisa Skálová
- (Denmark) Signe Bruun
- (Denmark) Mille Gejl
- (Denmark) Maria Hovmark
- (Germany) Laura Freigang
- (Germany) Giulia Gwinn
- (Iceland) Anna Pétursdóttir
- (Serbia) Tijana Filipović
- (Serbia) Miljana Ivanović
- (Spain) Patricia Guijarro
- (Spain) Maite Oroz
- (Switzerland) Naomi Mégroz
- (Switzerland) Camille Surdez

Source: UEFA.com
