= 2015 UEFA Women's Under-17 Championship =

European football tournament

2015 UEFA U17 ára meistaramót kvenna

Tournament details
- Host country: Iceland
- Dates: 22 June – 4 July
- Teams: 8 (from 1 confederation)
- Venues: 6 (in 4 host cities)

Final positions
- Champions: Spain (3rd title)
- Runners-up: Switzerland

Tournament statistics
- Matches played: 15
- Goals scored: 45 (3 per match)
- Attendance: 6,369 (425 per match)
- Top scorer: (Germany) Stefanie Sanders (6 goals)
- Best player: (Germany) Stefanie Sanders

The 2015 UEFA Women's Under-17 Championship was the eighth edition of the UEFA Women's Under-17 Championship, the annual European youth football competition contested by the women's under-17 national teams of the member associations of UEFA. Iceland hosted the tournament. Players born on or after 1 January 1998 were eligible to participate in this competition.

Each match lasted 80 minutes, consisting of two halves of 40 minutes, with an interval of 15 minutes.

== Qualification ==
A total of 44 UEFA nations entered the competition, and with the hosts Iceland qualifying automatically, the other 43 teams competed in the qualifying competition to determine the remaining seven spots in the final tournament. The qualifying competition consisted of two rounds: Qualifying round, which took place in autumn 2014, and Elite round, which took place in spring 2015.

=== Qualified teams ===
The following eight teams qualified for the final tournament.

Team	Method of qualification	Finals appearance	Last appearance	Previous best performance
Iceland	Hosts	2nd	2011	Fourth place (2011)
Switzerland	Elite round Group 1 winners	2nd	2012	Fourth place (2012)
England	Elite round Group 2 winners	3rd	2014	Fourth place (2008, 2014)
Republic of Ireland	Elite round Group 2 runners-up	2nd	2010	Runners-up (2010)
Germany	Elite round Group 3 winners	7th	2014	Champions (2008, 2009, 2012, 2014)
Spain	Elite round Group 4 winners	6th	2014	Champions (2010, 2011)
Norway	Elite round Group 5 winners	2nd	2009	Fourth place (2009)
France	Elite round Group 6 winners	6th	2014	Runners-up (2008, 2011, 2012)

Notes

1. The best runners-up among all six elite round groups qualified for the final tournament.

=== Final draw ===
The final draw was held in Reykjavík, Iceland on 29 April 2015, 11:30 WET (UTC±0). The eight teams were drawn into two groups of four teams. There were no seeding except that the hosts Iceland were assigned to position A1 in the draw.

== Venues ==
The competition was played at six venues in four host cities.

- Grindavíkurvöllur, Grindavík
- Kópavogsvöllur, Kópavogur
- Akranesvöllur, Akranes
- Vikingsvöllur, Reykjavík
- Fylkisvöllur, Reykjavík
- Valsvöllur, Reykjavík

== Squads ==
Each national team had to submit a squad of 18 players.

== Match officials ==
A total of 6 referees, 8 assistant referees and 2 fourth officials were appointed for the final tournament.

Referees

- Barbara Bollenberg (Austria)
- Ivana Martinčić (Croatia)
- Vivian Peeters (Netherlands)
- Graziella Pirriatore (Italy)
- (North Macedonia) Ivana Projkovska (Macedonia)
- Viola Raudziņa (Latvia)

Assistant referees

- Liana Grigoryan (Armenia)
- Aleksandra Kojović (Serbia)
- Julia Magnusson (Sweden)
- Slavomira Majkuthová (Slovakia)
- Androniki Nioti (Greece)
- Rúna Stefánsdóttir (Iceland)
- Maryna Striletska (Ukraine)
- Bjorn Valdimarsson (Iceland)

Fourth officials

- Dimitrina Milkova (Bulgaria)
- Lois Otte (Belgium)

== Group stage ==
2015 UEFA Women's Under-17 Championship teams and final tournament performance

Group winners and runners-up advanced to the semi-finals.

Tiebreakers

if two or more teams were equal on points on completion of the group matches, the following tie-breaking criteria were applied, in the order given, to determine the rankings:

1. Higher number of points obtained in the group matches played among the teams in question;
2. Superior goal difference resulting from the group matches played among the teams in question;
3. Higher number of goals scored in the group matches played among the teams in question;
4. If, after having applied criteria 1 to 3, teams still had an equal ranking, criteria 1 to 3 were reapplied exclusively to the group matches between the teams in question to determine their final rankings. If this procedure did not lead to a decision, criteria 5 to 9 applied;
5. Superior goal difference in all group matches;
6. Higher number of goals scored in all group matches;
7. If only two teams had the same number of points, and they were tied according to criteria 1 to 6 after having met in the last round of the group stage, their rankings were determined by a penalty shoot-out (not used if more than two teams had the same number of points, or if their rankings were not relevant for qualification for the next stage).
8. Lower disciplinary points total based only on yellow and red cards received in the group matches (red card = 3 points, yellow card = 1 point, expulsion for two yellow cards in one match = 3 points);
9. Drawing of lots.

All times were local, WET (UTC±0).

=== Group A ===
Pos	Team	Pld	W	D	L	GF	GA	GD	Pts	Qualification
1	Spain	3	2	1	0	7	1	+6	7	Advance to knockout stage
2	Germany	3	2	0	1	10	4	+6	6	Advance to knockout stage
3	England	3	1	1	1	4	7	−3	4	
4	Iceland (H)	3	0	0	3	1	10	−9	0	

Source: UEFA
(H) Hosts
22 June 2015
13:00

England	1–1	Spain
Cross 51'	Report	García 54'

Grindavíkurvöllur, Grindavík
Attendance: 271
Referee: Ivana Martinčić (Croatia)
22 June 2015
19:00

Iceland	0–5	Germany
	Report	Krug 5'; Sanders 35', 43'; Dallmann 70'; Orschmann 73'

Grindavíkurvöllur, Grindavík
Attendance: 707
Referee: Barbara Bollenberg (Austria)

25 June 2015
13:00

Germany	0–4	Spain
	Report	García 9', 21', 36'; Bonmati 90+4'

Akranesvöllur, Akranes
Attendance: 372
Referee: Vivian Peeters (Netherlands)
25 June 2015
19:00

Iceland	1–3	England
Pálsdóttir 66'	Report	Plumptre 28'; Devlin 44'; Allen 78'

Akranesvöllur, Akranes
Attendance: 713
Referee: Ivana Projkovska (Macedonia)

28 June 2015
19:00

Spain	2–0	Iceland
Guijarro 17'; Sierra 63'	Report

Kópavogsvöllur, Kópavogur
Attendance: 415
Referee: Ivana Projkovska (Macedonia)
28 June 2015
19:00

Germany	5–0	England
Pawollek 2'; Sanders 37', 46', 72', 80'	Report

Fylkisvöllur, Reykjavík
Attendance: 243
Referee: Barbara Bollenberg (Austria)

=== Group B ===
Pos	Team	Pld	W	D	L	GF	GA	GD	Pts	Qualification
1	Switzerland	3	2	1	0	5	3	+2	7	Advance to knockout stage
2	France	3	2	0	1	4	2	+2	6	Advance to knockout stage
3	Norway	3	1	1	1	4	4	0	4	
4	Republic of Ireland	3	0	0	3	0	4	−4	0	

Source: UEFA
22 June 2015
13:00

Republic of Ireland	0–1	France
	Report	Laurent 65'

Kópavogsvöllur, Kópavogur
Attendance: 227
Referee: Vivian Peeters (Netherlands)
22 June 2015
19:00

Switzerland	2–2	Norway
Reuteler 36'; Jenzer 48'	Report	Kvernvolden 10'; Wilmann 51'

Kópavogsvöllur, Kópavogur
Attendance: 240
Referee: Viola Raudziņa (Latvia)

25 June 2015
13:00

Republic of Ireland	0–1	Switzerland
	Report	Lehmann 55'

Vikingsvöllur, Reykjavík
Attendance: 317
Referee: Graziella Pirriatore (Italy)
25 June 2015
19:00

France	2–0	Norway
Katoto 20'; Fercocq 36'	Report

Vikingsvöllur, Reykjavík
Attendance: 283
Referee: Ivana Martinčić (Croatia)

28 June 2015
13:00

Norway	2–0	Republic of Ireland
Norem 19'; Kvernvolden 40'	Report

Kópavogsvöllur, Kópavogur
Attendance: 205
Referee: Viola Raudziņa (Latvia)
28 June 2015
13:00

France	1–2	Switzerland
De Almeida 9'	Report	Reuteler 66'; Stampfli 80+2'

Fylkisvöllur, Reykjavík
Attendance: 233
Referee: Graziella Pirriatore (Italy)

== Knockout stage ==
In the knockout stage, penalty shoot-out was used to decide the winner if necessary (no extra time was played).

There was no third place match for this edition of the tournament as it was not used as a qualifier for the FIFA U-17 Women's World Cup (since expansion to eight teams).

=== Bracket ===
Semi-finals
1 July – Reykjavík
Spain (p)	1 (4)
France	1 (3)
1 July – Reykjavík
Switzerland	1
Germany	0

Final
4 July – Reykjavík
Spain	5
Switzerland	2

=== Semi-finals ===
1 July 2015
13:00

Spain	1–1	France
Montilla 79'	Report	Galera 63'
Penalties
Rodríguez (penalty scored); Montilla (penalty scored); Bonmati (penalty scored); Guijarro (penalty missed); García (penalty scored)	4–3	(penalty scored) Lebastard; (penalty scored) Laplacette; (penalty missed) Boutaleb; (penalty missed) Galera; (penalty scored) Katoto

Valsvöllur, Reykjavík
Attendance: 807
Referee: Vivian Peeters (Netherlands)

1 July 2015
19:00

Switzerland	1–0	Germany
Arfaoui 80'	Report

Valsvöllur, Reykjavík
Attendance: 579
Referee: Ivana Martinčić (Croatia)

=== Final ===
4 July 2015
16:00

Spain	5–2	Switzerland
García 6'; Felder 13' (o.g.); Mégroz 50' (o.g.); Menayo 64'; Navarro 90+2'	Report	Reuteler 55'; Arfaoui 78'

Valsvöllur, Reykjavík
Attendance: 757
Referee: Barbara Bollenberg (Austria)

== Goalscorers ==
6 goals

- (Germany) Stefanie Sanders

5 goals

- (Spain) Lucía García

3 goals

- (Switzerland) Géraldine Reuteler

2 goals

- (Norway) Ingrid Kvernvolden
- (Switzerland) Amira Arfaoui

1 goal

- (England) Georgia Allen
- (England) Zoe Cross
- (England) Charlotte Devlin
- (England) Ashleigh Plumptre
- (France) Élisa De Almeida
- (France) Hélène Fercocq
- (France) Sarah Galera
- (France) Marie-Antoinette Katoto
- (France) Emelyne Laurent
- (Germany) Jule Dallmann
- (Germany) Victoria Krug
- (Germany) Dina Orschmann
- (Germany) Tanja Pawollek
- (Iceland) Andrea Mist Pálsdóttir
- (Norway) Jenny Norem
- (Norway) Andrea Wilmann
- (Spain) Aitana Bonmati
- (Spain) Patricia Guijarro
- (Spain) Carmen Menayo
- (Spain) Natalia Montilla
- (Spain) Lorena Navarro
- (Spain) Andrea Sierra
- (Switzerland) Lara Jenzer
- (Switzerland) Alisha Lehmann
- (Switzerland) Jolanda Stampfli

Own goal

- (Switzerland) Luisa Felder (playing against Spain)
- (Switzerland) Naomi Mégroz (playing against Spain)

Source: UEFA.com

== Team of the tournament ==
Goalkeepers

- (Switzerland) Nadja Furrer
- (Spain) Amaia Peña

Defenders

- (Germany) Anna Gerhardt
- (Spain) Berta Pujadas
- (Switzerland) Luisa Felder
- (Spain) Laia Aleixandri
- (France) Sarah Galera
- (Spain) Lucía Rodríguez

Midfielders

- (Germany) Giulia Gwinn
- (Spain) Patricia Guijarro
- (Switzerland) Lara Jenzer
- (Spain) Maite Oroz
- (Spain) Aitana Bonmati

Forwards

- (Norway) Ingrid Kvernvolden
- (Germany) Stefanie Sanders
- (Switzerland) Géraldine Reuteler
- (Spain) Natalia Montilla
- (Spain) Lucía García

Source: UEFA Technical Report

Golden player: (Germany) Stefanie Sanders
