= Koçer =

Koçer is a Turkish surname. The word consists of "Koç for ram" and "er for man, soldier". Together, "Koçer" means the brave man or soldier.

- Guido Koçer (born 1988), German-Turkish footballer
- Zeynep Gamze Koçer (born 1998), Turkish footballer
