= Tarsus City Stadium =

Football stadium in Mersin Province, Turkey

- Tarsus Şehir Stadyumu
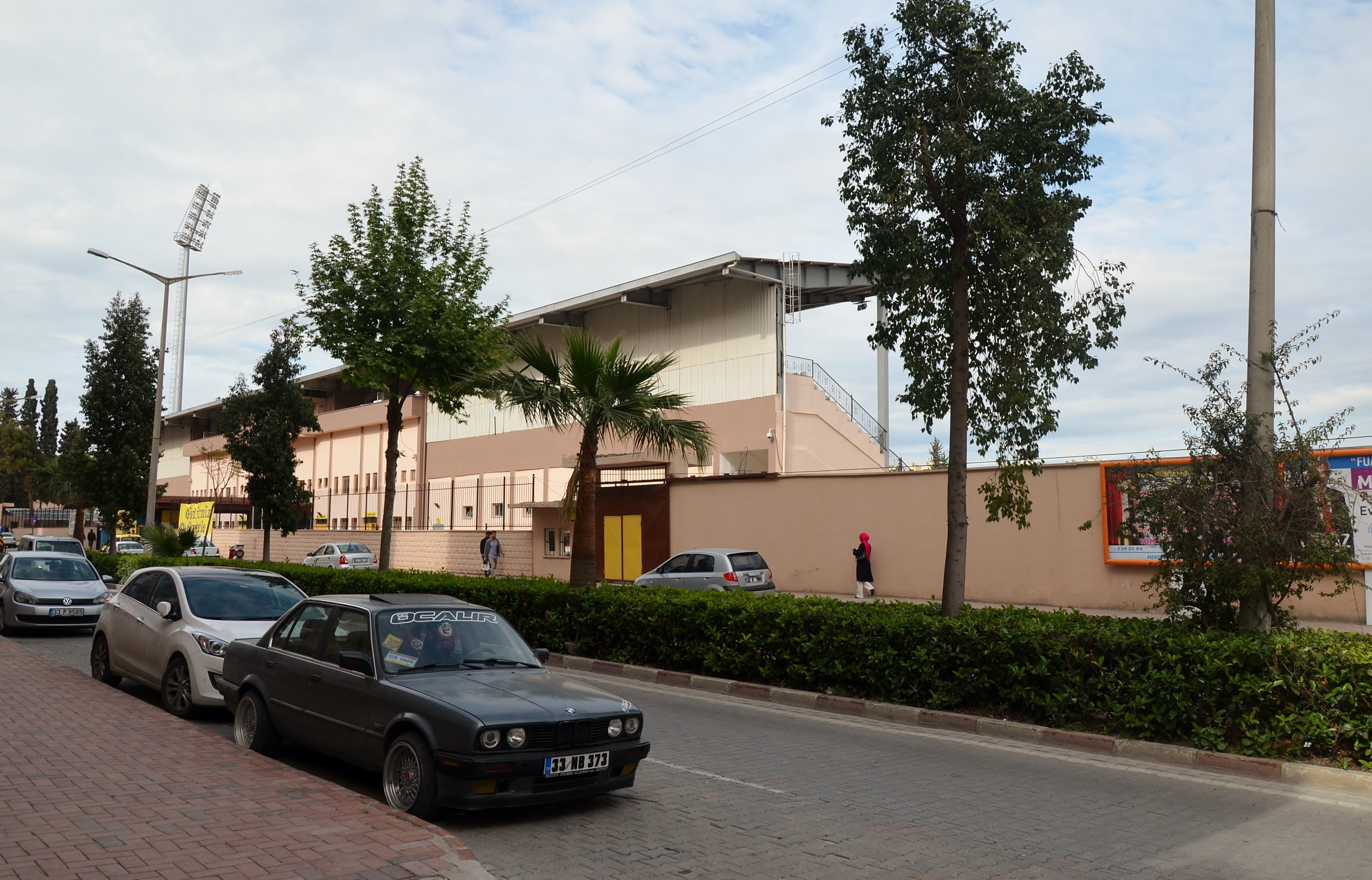
- Interactive map of Tarsus City Stadium
- Location: Tarsus, Mersin, Turkey
- Coordinates: 36°54′49″N 34°53′10″E
- Operator: Directorate of Mersin Youth Services and Sports
- Capacity: 4,189

Tenant
- Tarsus İdman Yurdu

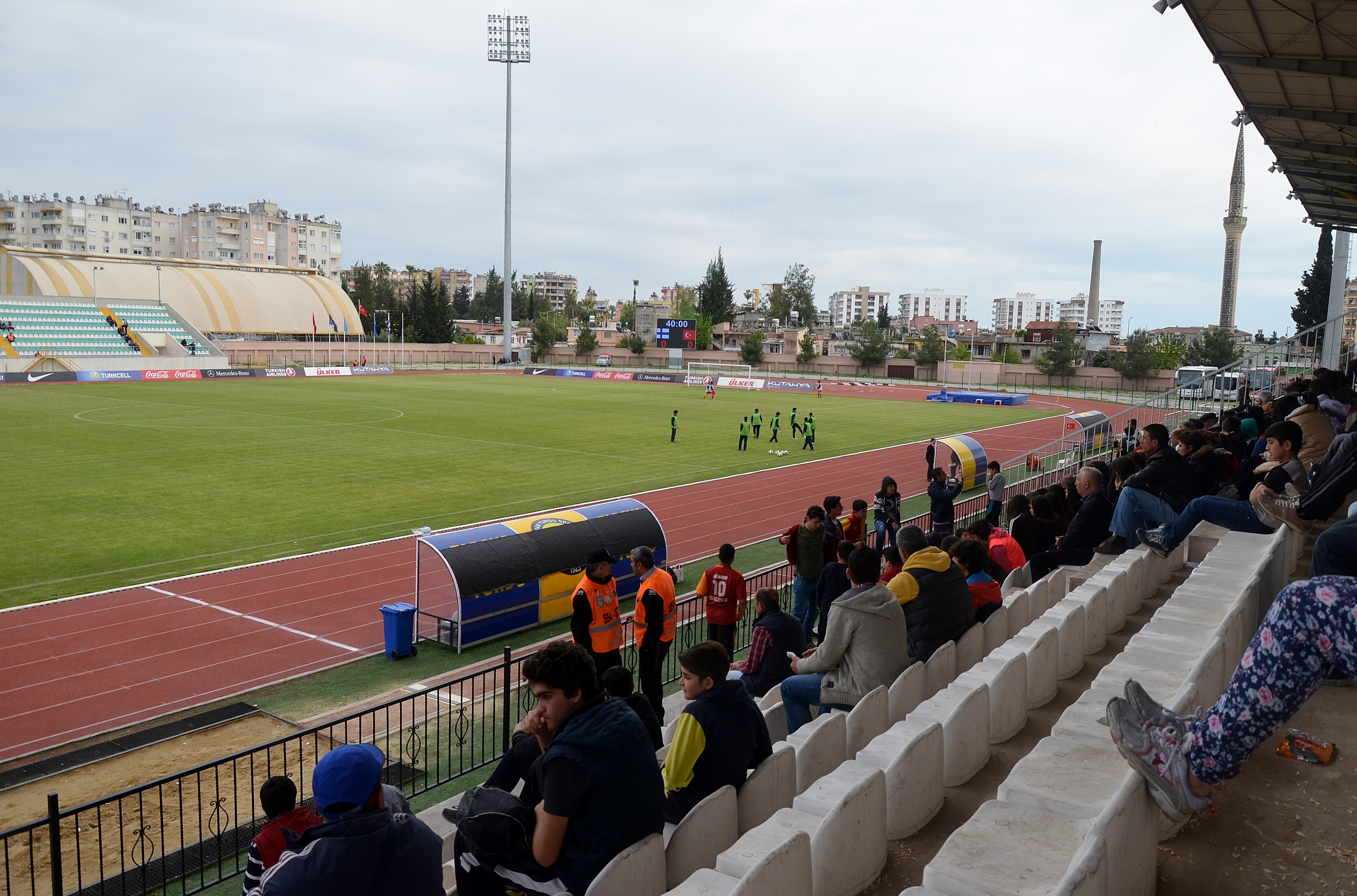
Tarsus City Stadium (April 2015).

Tarsus City Stadium (Turkish: Tarsus Şehir Stadyumu), is a football stadium in Tarsus in Mersin Province, Turkey. It is operated by Directorate of Mersin Youth Services and Sports.

It was completely renovated including the rebuilding of the covered stands. Tarsus İdman Yurdu football team play their home matches in the Tarsus City Stadium.

== International events hosted ==
2013 Mediterranean Game

The stadium hosted nine out of 20 football matches played in 2013 Mediterranean Games between June 19 and 27.

2015 UEFA Women's Under-17 Championship qualification

From April 11 to 16, three of the six 2015 UEFA Women's Under-17 Championship qualification - Elite round Group 1 games were played in the stadium.
