= Darya Stezhko =

Belarusian footballer

Personal information
- Date of birth: 17 February 1998 (age 28)
- Place of birth: Minsk, Belarus
- Height: 1.86 m (6 ft 1 in)
- Position: Midfielder

Team information
- Current team: Dinamo-BGU

Senior career*
Years	Team	Apps	(Gls)
2014–2019	Zorka-BDU	55	(47)
2020–	Dinamo-BGU	26	(9)

International career^{‡}
2013–2015	Belarus U17	8	(4)
2019–	Belarus	3	(0)
- * Club domestic league appearances and goals as of 3 November 2019 ‡ National team caps and goals as of 8 October 2019

Darya Stezhko (born 17 February 1998) is a Belarusian footballer who plays as a forward for Premier League club FC Dinamo Minsk and the Belarus women's national team.
