= Zeynep Koçer =

Turkish footballer (born 1998)

Zeynep Gamze Koçer
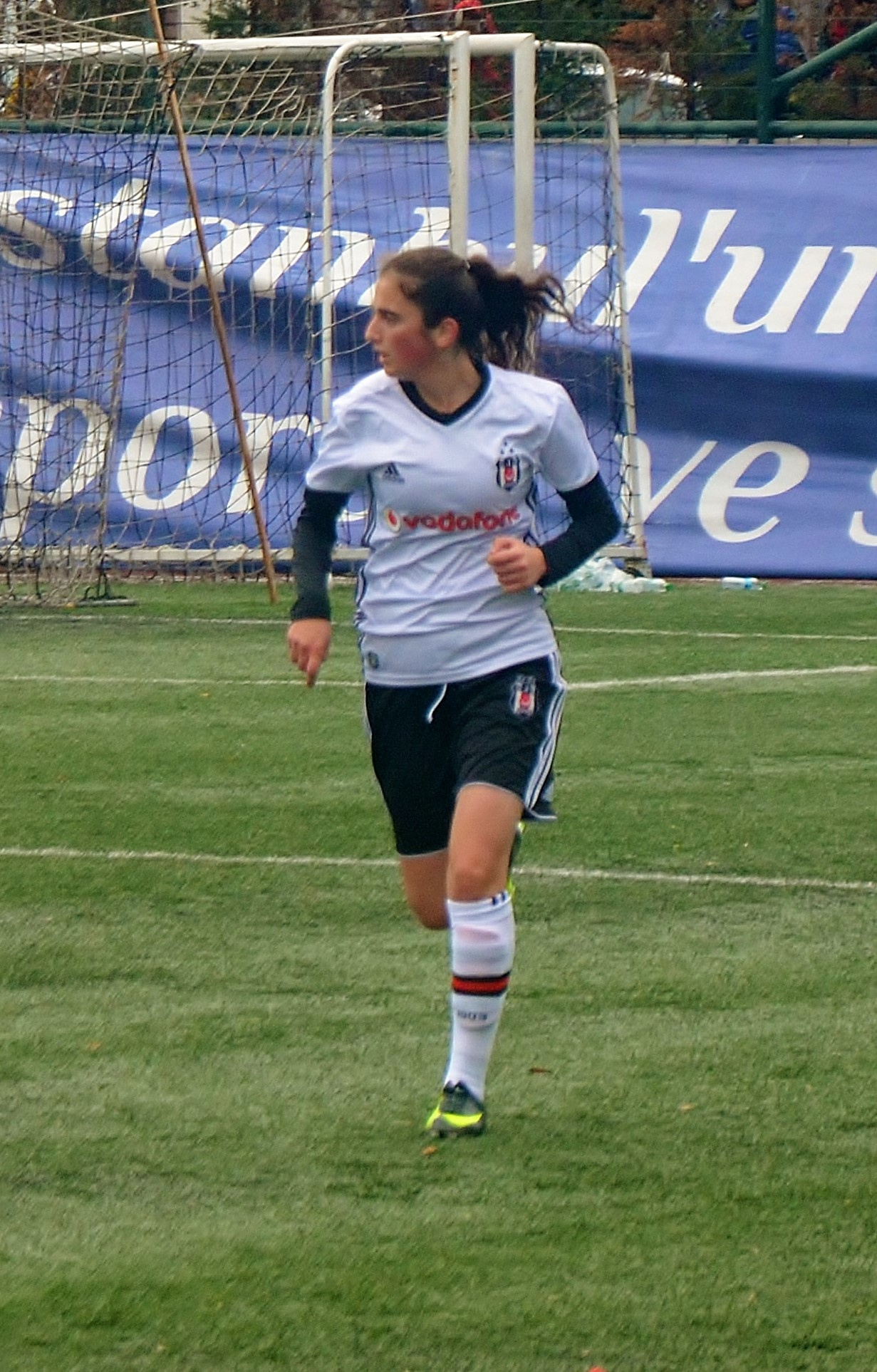
- Zeynep Gamze Koçer playing for Beşiktaş J.K.

Personal information
- Date of birth: 15 April 1998 (age 28)
- Place of birth: Bakırköy, Istanbul, Turkey
- Position: Forward

Team information
- Current team: Fatih Vatan
- Number: 23

Senior career*
Years	Team	Apps	(Gls)
2010–2012	Kaynarcaspor	16	(1)
2014–2023	Beşiktaş	140	(53)
2023–22024	Kdz. Ereğli	28	(7)
2024–	Fatih Vatan	12	(2)

International career^{‡}
2015–2017	Turkey U-19	13	(6)
- * Club domestic league appearances and goals as of 15 December 2022 ‡ National team caps and goals as of 10 April 2017

Zeynep Gamze Koçer (born 15 April 1998) is a Turkish women's football forward who plays in the Turkish Super League for Fatih Vatan with jersey number 23. She is a member of the Turkey national U-19 team.

== Club career ==
Koçer joined Beşiktaş J.K. in the 2014–15, which competed in the Women's Regional League. She enjoyed her team's champion title in two successive seasons getting promoted finally to the First League. She enjoyed the champion title of her team in the 2018–19 season. Following her team's champions title in the 2020–21 Turkcell League season, she played inonematces of the 2021–22 UEFA Women's Champions League qualifying rounds.

End August 2*023, she transferred to Kdz. Ereğli to play in the 2023–24 Turkish Super League. She scored seven goals in 28 matches played.

After one season, she moved to Fatih Vatan in Istanbul.

== International career ==
Koçer was admitted to the Turkey national U-19 team debuting in the friendly match against Russia on 8 December 2015. She was part of the team, which became champion of the 2016 UEFA Women's Under-19 Development Toırnament. She took part in every three matches of the 2017 UEFA Women's Under-19 Championship qualification – Group 10 and Elite round – Group 2.

International goals (Friendly matches not included)
Date	Venue	Opponent	Competition	Result	Scored
Turkey women's national U-19 team
9 June 2016	Buftea, Romania	Slovenia	UEFA Development Tournament	W 8–0	2
10 June 2016	Mogoșoaia, Romania	Romania	UEFA Development Tournament	W 8–1	1
19 October 2016	Balchik, Bulgaria	Moldova	2017 UEFA U-19 Championship qualification – Group 10	W 1–0	1
21 October 2016	Albena, Bulgaria	Bulgaria	2017 UEFA U-19 Championship qualification – Group 10	W 3–0	1

== Personal life ==
Growing up, Koçer was a fan of Spanish footballer Fernando Torres.

== Career statistics ==
As of 15 December 2024.

Club	Season	League			Continental		National		Total	
Club	Season	Division	Apps	Goals	Apps	Goals	Apps	Goals	Apps	Goals
Kaynarcaspor	2010–11	Regional League	10	1	–	–	0	0	10	1
Kaynarcaspor	2011–12	Second League	6	0	–	–	0	0	6	0
Kaynarcaspor	Total		16	1	–	–	0	0	16	1
Beşiktaş	2014–15	Third League	18	12	–	–	0	0	18	12
Beşiktaş	2015–16	Second League	20	13	–	–	5	4	25	17
Beşiktaş	2016–17	First League	21	7	–	–	8	2	29	9
Beşiktaş	2017–18	First League	19	1	–	–	0	0	19	1
Beşiktaş	2018–19	First League	14	6	–	–	0	0	14	6
Beşiktaş	2019–20	First League	12	3	–	–	0	0	12	3
Beşiktaş	2020–21	First League	2	0	–	–	0	0	2	0
Beşiktaş	2021–22	Super League	21	9	1	0	0	0	22	9
Beşiktaş	2022–23	Super League	13	2	0	0	0	0	13	2
Beşiktaş	Total		140	53	1	0	13	6	154	59
Kdz. Ereğli	2023–24	Super League	28	7	1	0			28	7
Fatih Vatan	2024–25	Super League	12	2	0	0	0	0	12	2
Career total			196	63	1	0	13	6	212	69

== Honours ==
=== Club ===
Turkish First League

Beşiktaş
Champions (2): 2018–19, 2020–21
Runners-up (2): 2016–17, 2017–18

Turkish Second League

beşiktaş
Champions (1): 2015–16

Turkish Third League

Beşiktaş
Champions (1): 2014–15

=== International ===
UEFA Development Tournament

Turkey women's U-19
Winners (1): 2016
