= Nadja Furrer =

Swiss footballer (born 1998)

Personal information
- Full name: Nadja Ramona Furrer
- Date of birth: 30 April 1998 (age 28)
- Place of birth: Zürich, Switzerland
- Position: Goalkeeper

Team information
- Current team: Grasshoppers
- Number: 35

Senior career*
Years	Team	Apps	(Gls)
2013–	Grasshoppers		

International career^{‡}
2014–2015	Switzerland U17	5	(0)
2015–2017	Switzerland U19	9	(0)
2017–	Switzerland	2	(0)
- * Club domestic league appearances and goals ‡ National team caps and goals as of 00:09, 13 March 2021 (UTC)

Nadja Furrer (born 30 April 1998) is a Swiss footballer who plays as a goalkeeper for Grasshoppers and the Switzerland national team.

== International career ==
Furrer made her debut for the Switzerland national team on 4 March 2019, as a starter against Portugal.
