= Anna Rakel Pétursdóttir =

Icelandic footballer

Personal information
- Full name: Anna Rakel Pétursdóttir
- Date of birth: 24 August 1998 (age 28)
- Place of birth: Iceland,
- Positions: Defender; midfielder

Team information
- Current team: Valur
- Number: 11

Senior career*
Years	Team	Apps	(Gls)
2014–2018	Þór/KA	81	(10)
2019	Linköpings FC	18	(0)
2020	IK Uppsala	20	(0)
2021–	Valur	12	(2)

International career^{‡}
2018–	Iceland	6	(0)
- * Club domestic league appearances and goals as of 15:46, 29 December 2019 (UTC) ‡ National team caps and goals as of 19:28, 24 June 2019 (UTC)

Anna Rakel Pétursdóttir (born 24 August 1998) is an Icelandic footballer who plays as a defender for Valur and the Iceland national team. She had previously played for Linköpings FC and the Icelandic club Þór/KA.

== Club career ==
In December 2018 Anna Rakel signed a two-year professional contract with Swedish Damallsvenskan club Linköpings FC. She agreed a transfer to newly-promoted Damallsvenskan club IK Uppsala in December 2019, signing a one-year contract.

== International career ==
Anna Rakel made her senior debut for the Iceland national team in January 2018, playing in a 2–1 friendly defeat by Norway at La Manga Club.

== Honours ==
Þór/KA

Winner

- Úrvalsdeild: 2017
- Icelandic Women's Super Cup: 2018
