= Margarita Yushko =

Belarusian footballer

Personal information
- Date of birth: 23 August 1998 (age 28)
- Place of birth: Belarus,
- Position: Defender

Team information
- Current team: ABFF U19

Senior career*
Years	Team	Apps	(Gls)
2014-2019	FC Minsk	51	(7)
2020-	ABFF U19	0	(0)

International career^{‡}
- Belarus
- * Club domestic league appearances and goals as of 16:40, 10 May 2020 (UTC) ‡ National team caps and goals as of 19:27, 30 August 2019 (UTC)

Margarita Yushko (born 23 August 1998) is a Belarusian footballer who plays as a defender and has appeared for the Belarus women's national team.

== Career ==
Yushko has been capped for the Belarus national team, appearing for the team during the 2019 FIFA Women's World Cup qualifying cycle.
