= Michaela Dubcová =

Czech footballer

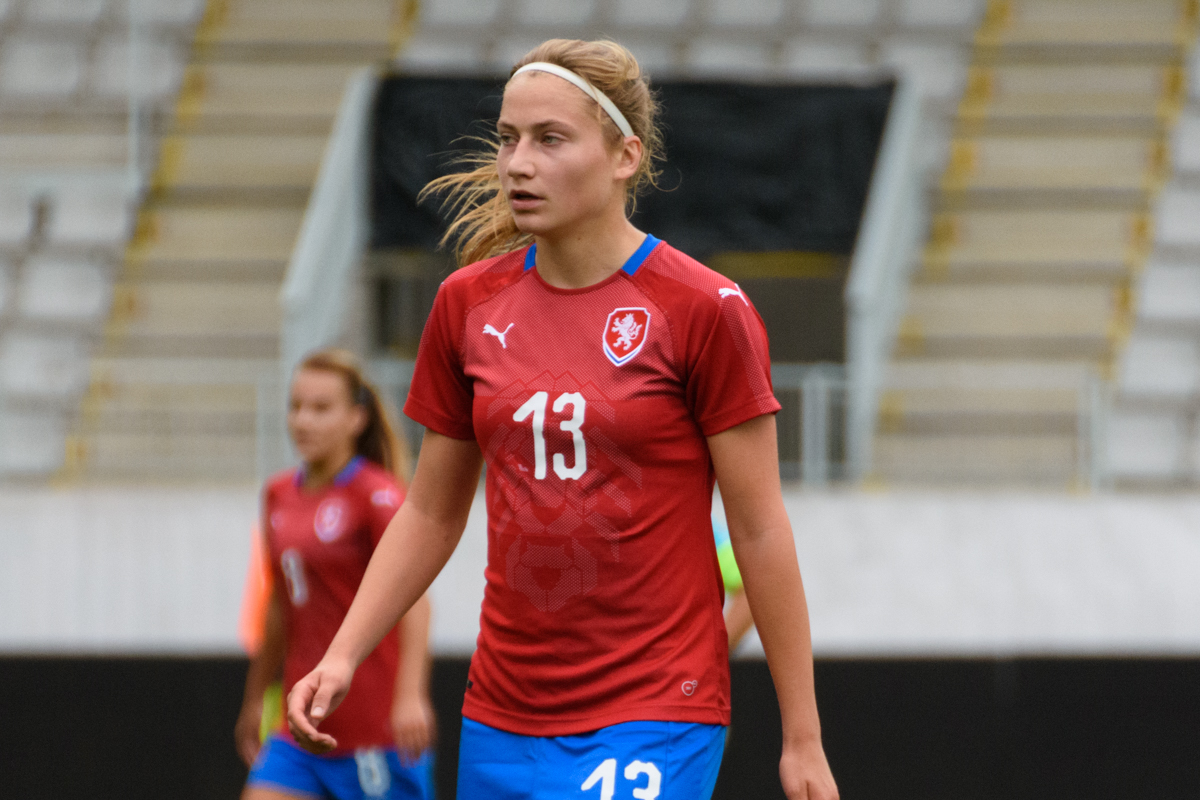
- Dubcová playing for the Czech Republic in 2018

Personal information
- Date of birth: 17 January 1999 (age 27)
- Place of birth: Valašské Meziříčí, Czech Republic
- Position: Midfielder

Youth career
- Slovácko

Senior career*
Years	Team	Apps	(Gls)
2017–2018	Slovácko		
2018–2019	Slavia Praha	17	(19)
2019–2022	Sassuolo	52	(18)
2022–2023	AC Milan	20	(1)

International career^{‡}
2018–2023	Czech Republic	11	(0)

Managerial career
- 2023–: AC Milan (assistant)
- * Club domestic league appearances and goals as of 24 July 2023 ‡ National team caps and goals as of 24 July 2023

Michaela Dubcová (born 17 January 1999) is a Czech football coach and former professional footballer who played as a midfielder for Serie A club AC Milan and the Czech Republic women's national team. She's the twin sister of Kamila Dubcová who is also professional footballer.

Dubcová made the surprise move in 2023 to retire as a player at age of 25 to join the AC Milan coaching staff as assistant first-team coach.

== Career ==
Dubcová has been capped for the Czech Republic national team, appearing for the team during the 2019 FIFA Women's World Cup qualifying cycle.
