= Zoé Magyarics =

Hungarian footballer

Personal information
- Date of birth: 5 June 1998 (age 28)
- Position: Forward

International career^{‡}
Years	Team	Apps	(Gls)
2015–	Hungary	19	(1)
- ‡ National team caps and goals as of 19:39, 1 December 2020 (UTC)

Zoé Magyarics (born 5 June 1998) is a Hungarian footballer who plays as a forward and has appeared for the Hungary women's national team.

== Career ==
Magyarics has been capped for the Hungary national team, appearing for the team during the 2019 FIFA Women's World Cup qualifying cycle.
