= Giulia Pezzotta =

Italian footballer

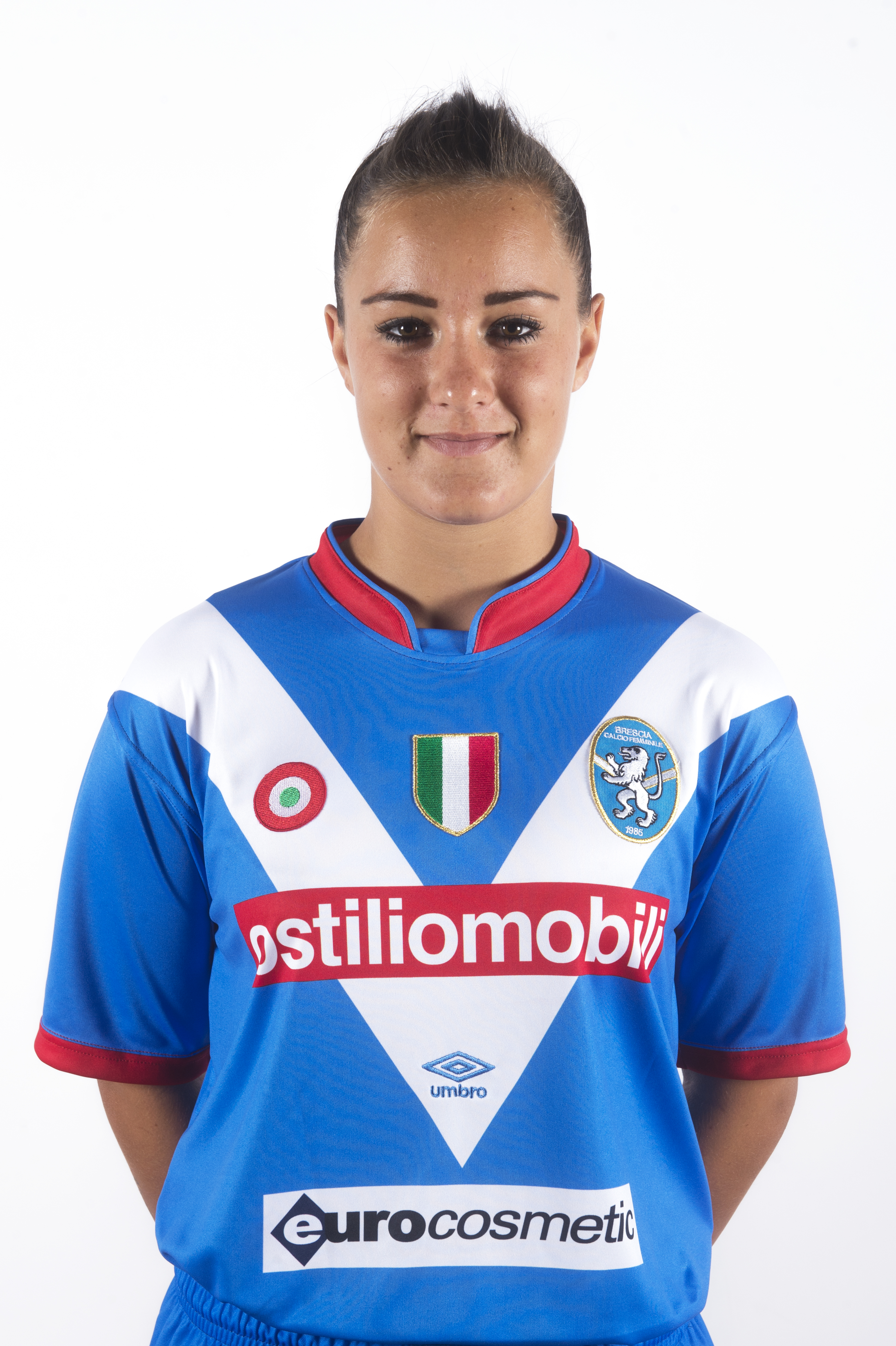

Personal information
- Position: Defender

Team information
- Current team: Brescia

Giulia Pezzotta is an Italian professional footballer who plays as a defender for Brescia.
