= Quinty Sabajo =

Surinamese footballer (born 1999)

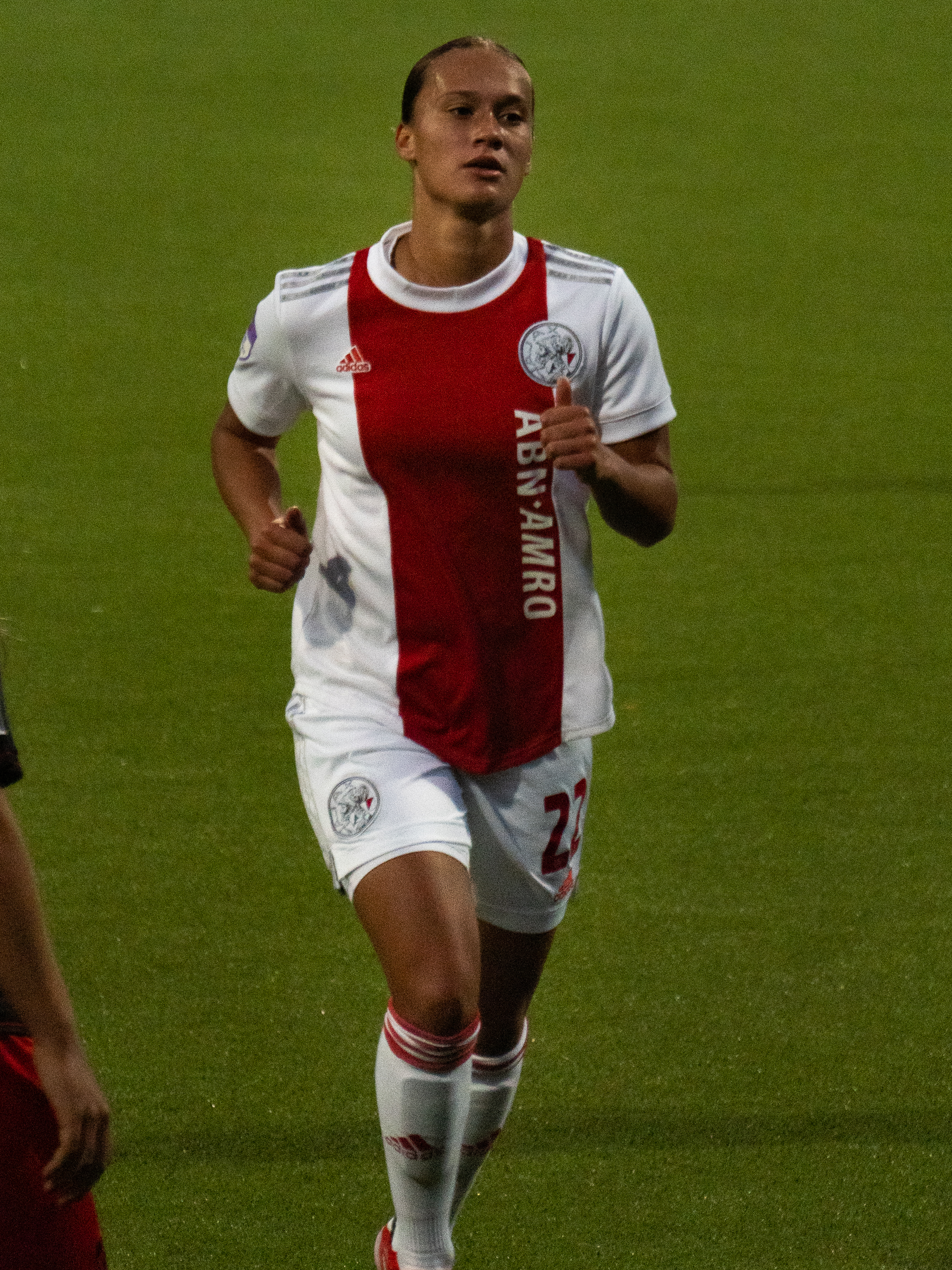
- Sabajo with Ajax in 2021

Personal information
- Full name: Quinty Zoë Serena Sabajo
- Date of birth: 1 August 1999 (age 27)
- Place of birth: Maarssen, Netherlands
- Position: Midfielder

Team information
- Current team: ABB Fomget
- Number: 3

Youth career
- VV OSM '75

Senior career*
Years	Team	Apps	(Gls)
2017–2020	Heerenveen	33	(10)
2020–2025	Ajax	75	(12)
2025–2026	Rangers	5	(3)
2026–	ABB Fomget	0	(0)

International career^{‡}
2015	Netherlands U16	5	(1)
2015–2016	Netherlands U17	8	(2)
2016–2018	Netherlands U19	24	(5)
2018	Netherlands U20	4	(0)
2019	Netherlands U23	6	(0)
2025–	Suriname	1	(0)
- * Club domestic league appearances and goals as of 7 June 2026 ‡ National team caps and goals as of 2 December 2025

Quinty Zoë Serena Sabajo (born 1 August 1999) is a professional footballer who plays as a midfielder for Turkish Women's Football Super League club ABB Fomget. Born in the Netherlands and having previously represented the Netherlands at the youth national level, she plays for the Suriname national team. Sabajo has previously played for Eredivisie clubs Heerenveen and Ajax, in addition to Scottish Women's Premier League club Rangers.

== Club career ==
As a child, Sabajo took up football without requiring any motivation from her parents. She played with boys' teams up until she was 15 years old. She was a member of local youth club VV OSM '75, which played in her hometown of Maarssen. Sabajo joined professional club Heerenveen in 2017 and made her Eredivisie debut one year later. She recorded 10 goals for the club in 33 matches .

Sabajo transferred from Heerenveen to Ajax in the summer of 2020. She debuted for the club on 6 September 2020, playing in a 3–1 victory over FC Twente. The following month, she scored her first goal for Ajax against her former team, Heerenveen. Over the course of the season, Sabajo played in 18 league games and scored twice, helping Ajax win its sixth KNVB Cup. She also signed a one-year contract extension after the conclusion of the campaign. On 30 October 2023, Sabajo scored a first half hat-trick in a 6–1 win over VV Alkmaar. Her contributions throughout the 2022–23 Eredivisie eventually ended up helping Ajax clinch its first league title in five years. Sabajo spent two more years at Ajax, reaching 100 matches across all competitions in March 2025. Her milestone came in a full-circle moment, as she played her 100th game against her first professional club, Heerenveen. Two of her final three Ajax goals came in a win over Excelsior Rotterdam that brought Ajax on level points with league-leaders Twente heading into the Eredivisie's winter break. However, FC Twente had the last laugh, ultimately winning the title nevertheless. At the end of the 2024–25 season, Sabajo's contract expired and she subsequently departed from Ajax.

On 19 September 2025, Sabajo signed a one-year deal with Scottish Women's Premier League club Rangers. She scored her first SWPL goal on 23 November 2025, contributing to a 3–0 win over Motherwell. After completing her season-long contract, Sabajo departed from Rangers in June 2026.

Sabajo joined Turkish club ABB Fomget in October 2026.

== International career ==
Sabajo has played for various Netherlands youth national teams. She was named in the Dutch squad for the 2018 FIFA U-20 Women's World Cup, where the Netherlands advanced to the knockout stages before being eliminated in the quarterfinals by England. In November 2019, Sabajo was a late addition to the Netherlands under-23 team after Joëlle Smits was promoted to the senior squad.

Born in the Netherlands, Sabajo is of Surinamese descent. She was called up to the Suriname national team in November 2025. On 1 December 2025, Sabajo's request to switch international allegiance to Suriname was approved by FIFA. She made her debut a day later.

== Honours ==
Ajax

- Eredivisie: 2022–23
- KNVB Cup: 2021–22, 2023–24
