= Ásdís Halldórsdóttir =

Icelandic footballer (born 1999)

Personal information
- Full name: Ásdís Karen Halldórsdóttir
- Date of birth: 20 December 1999 (age 26)
- Place of birth: Iceland
- Height: 1.76 m (5 ft 9 in)
- Position: Forward

Team information
- Current team: Braga
- Number: 10

Senior career*
Years	Team	Apps	(Gls)
2018–2019	Valur		
2019–2020	KR		
2020–2023	Valur		
2024	LSK Kvinner FK	11	(0)
2025	Madrid CFF	11	(0)
2025–	Braga	11	(2)

International career
2015–2016	Iceland U17		(0)
2016–2018	Iceland U18		
- Iceland
- * Club domestic league appearances and goals as of 20:06, 10 March 2026 (UTC)

Ásdís Karen Halldórsdóttir (born 20 December 1999) is an icelandic professional footballer who plays as a forward for Portuguese club Braga and the Iceland national team.

== Career ==
Ásdís' international career started in 2015, where she was in the Iceland U17 national team until 2016. From 2016 to 2018 she was in the Iceland U18. In 2022 Ásdís joined the national team of iceland with which she most recently participated in the UEFA Women's Euro 2025.

Ásdís' club career started with Valur (2018–2019). After playing for KR (2019–2020) she returned to Valur in 2020 for three more years until 2023. In 2024 she joined Norwegian side LSK Kvinner FK until 2025. For one season in 2025 she played for Madrid CFF. Ásdís moved to Portuguese club Braga in July 2025.

== Personal life ==
Apart from Ásdís' achievements in football, she has a bachelor's degree in financial engineering.
