= Freja Abildå =

Danish footballer (born 1998)

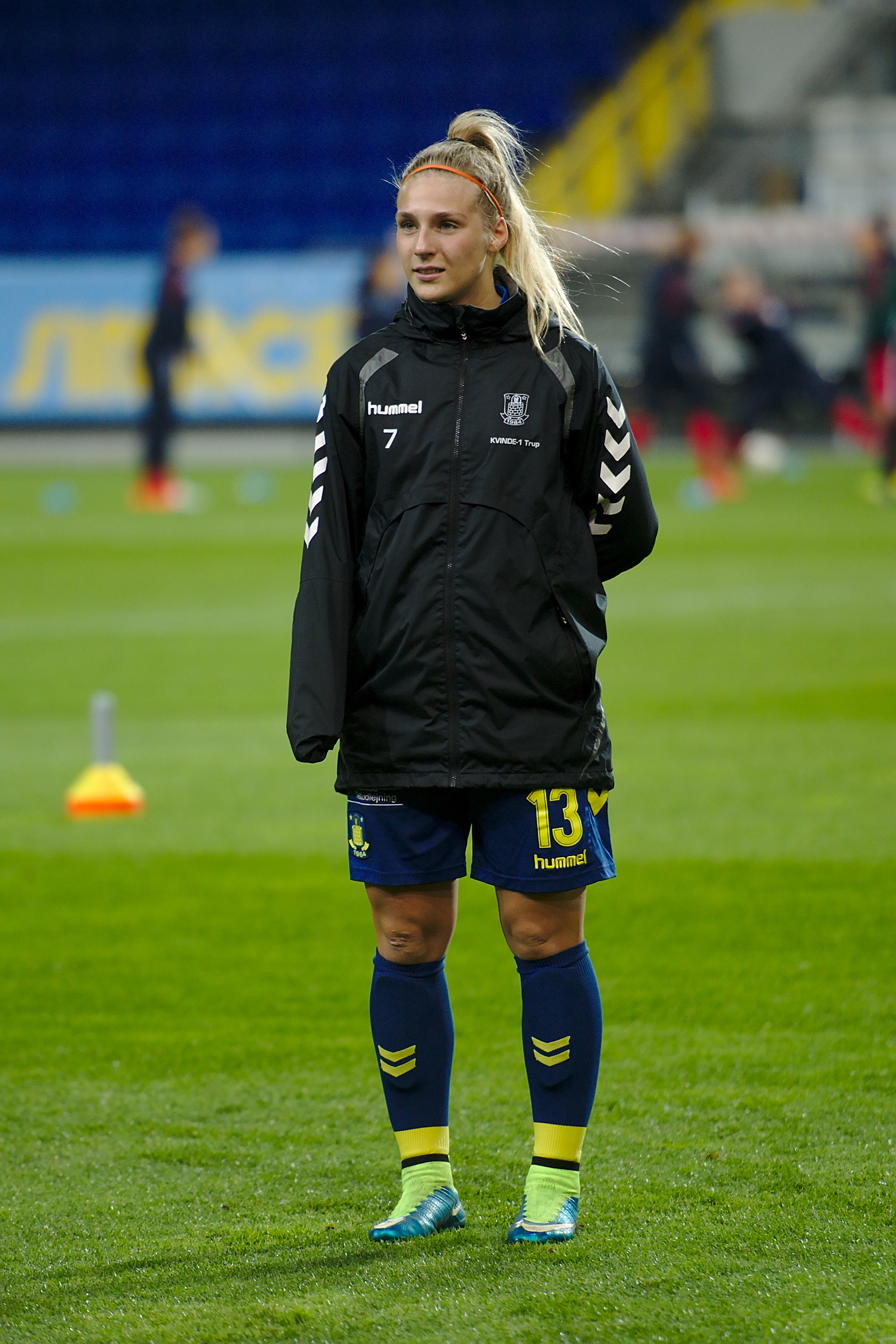
- Abildå with Brøndby in 2016

Personal information
- Full name: Freja Sørensen Abildå
- Date of birth: 11 May 1998 (age 28)
- Place of birth: Brøndby, Denmark
- Height: 1.68 m (5 ft 6 in)
- Position: Midfielder

Team information
- Current team: B.93

Senior career*
Years	Team	Apps	(Gls)
2017–2021	Brøndby IF	37	(2)
2021–2022	Sporting de Huelva	23	
2022–2024	Brøndby IF	12	(1)
2025–	B.93		

International career
2013	Denmark U16	6	(0)
2013–2015	Denmark U17	14	(2)
2015–2017	Denmark U19	16	(2)
- * Club domestic league appearances and goals

Freja Sørensen Abildå (born 11 May 1998) is a Danish professional footballer who plays as a midfielder for B-Liga side B.93.

== Club career ==
Abildå played youth football with Brøndby IF before being promoted to the senior squad in 2017. She played four seasons with Brøndby before joining Liga F side Sporting de Huelva for the 2021–22 season. In 2022, Abildå returned to Brøndby for two and a half years amid sustained periods of injuries. Abildå made 83 appearances total for Brøndby. In January 2025 she transferred to B.93, where she currently captains the B-Liga side.
