= Urška Bratuša =

Slovenian footballer

Personal information
- Date of birth: 7 September 1999 (age 27)
- Position: Midfielder

International career^{‡}
Years	Team	Apps	(Gls)
- Slovenia
- ‡ National team caps and goals as of 19:50, 30 August 2019 (UTC)

Urška Bratuša (born 7 September 1999) is a Slovenian footballer who plays as a midfielder and has appeared for the Slovenia women's national team.

== Career ==
Bratuša has been capped for the Slovenia national team, appearing for the team during the 2019 FIFA Women's World Cup qualifying cycle.
