= Agnieszka Jędrzejewicz =

Polish footballer

Personal information
- Date of birth: 6 June 1998 (age 28)
- Place of birth: Poland
- Position: Midfielder

Team information
- Current team: Unia Lublin (on loan from Górnik Łęczna)
- Number: 8

Youth career
- Huragan Międzyrzec Podlaski

Senior career*
Years	Team	Apps	(Gls)
2013	AZS PSW Biała Podlaska		
2013–2020	Górnik Łęczna		
2020–2022	Czarni Sosnowiec	41	(16)
2023–2024	Olimpija Ljubljana	1	(0)
2024–	Górnik Łęczna	8	(0)
2026–	→ Unia Lublin (loan)	9	(2)

International career
2018–2020	Poland	6	(0)
- * Club domestic league appearances and goals as of 21:57, 2 June 2026 (UTC)

Agnieszka Jędrzejewicz (born 6 June 1998) is a Polish professional footballer who plays as a midfielder for I liga club Unia Lublin, on loan from Górnik Łęczna.

== Career ==
Jędrzejewicz has been capped for the Poland national team, appearing for the team during the 2019 FIFA Women's World Cup qualifying cycle.

== Career statistics ==
=== International ===
Appearances and goals by national team and year
National team	Year	Apps	Goals
Poland	2018	5	0
Poland	2020	1	0
Total		6	0

== Honours ==
Górnik Łęczna

- Ekstraliga: 2017–18, 2018–19, 2019–20
- Polish Cup: 2017–18, 2019–20

Czarni Sosnowiec

- Ekstraliga: 2020–21
- Polish Cup: 2020–21, 2021–22
