= Maria Møller Thomsen =

Danish footballer

Personal information
- Date of birth: 24 October 1998 (age 28)
- Position: Defender

International career
Years	Team	Apps	(Gls)
2013–2014	Denmark U16	10	(0)
2014–2015	Denmark U17	8	(1)
2015–2017	Denmark U19	22	(1)
2017–2019	Denmark U23	2	(0)

Maria Møller Thomsen (born 24 October 1998) is a Danish footballer who plays as a defender.
