= Laura Frank =

Danish footballer (born 1998)

Personal information
- Full name: Laura Frank
- Date of birth: 3 August 1998 (age 28)
- Place of birth: Denmark
- Position: Defender

Team information
- Current team: Fortuna Hjørring
- Number: 18

Senior career*
Years	Team	Apps	(Gls)
2015–2019	Fortuna Hjørring	26	(3)
2020–2021	AaB	12	(0)
2021–	Fortuna Hjørring	20	(1)

International career^{‡}
2014	Denmark U17	3	(3)
2015–2017	Denmark U19	11	(3)
2018	Denmark	2	(0)
- * Club domestic league appearances and goals as of 22 August 2020 ‡ National team caps and goals as of 7 March 2018

Laura Frank (born 3 August 1998) is a Danish footballer who plays as a defender for A-Liga club Fortuna Hjørring. She has been a member of the Denmark women's national team.
