= Andrea Mist Pálsdóttir =

Icelandic footballer

Personal information
- Full name: Andrea Mist Pálsdóttir
- Date of birth: 25 October 1998 (age 28)
- Place of birth: Iceland,
- Position: Forward

Team information
- Current team: Växjö DFF
- Number: 23

Senior career*
Years	Team	Apps	(Gls)
2014–2019	Þór/KA	96	(14)
2019	Orobica	3	(0)
2020-2021	FH	11	(4)
2021	→ Breiðablik (loan)	0	(0)
2021-	Växjö DFF	17	(0)

International career^{‡}
2013–2014	Iceland U16	13	(1)
2013–2015	Iceland U17	7	(1)
2015–2017	Iceland U19	10	(1)
2018–2019	Iceland	3	(0)
- * Club domestic league appearances and goals as of 24 August 2020 ‡ National team caps and goals as of 9 April 2019

Andrea Mist Pálsdóttir (born 25 October 1998) is an Icelandic footballer who plays as a forward for Damallsvenskan club Växjö DFF and the Iceland women's national team.

In January 2021, Andrea was loaned to Breiðablik. She appeared in one match with Breiðablik in the Icelandic League Cup on 13 February but signed with Växjö DFF a week later.
