= Hélène Fercocq =

French association footballer (born 1998)

Personal information
- Full name: Hélène Jeanne Claudette Fercocq
- Date of birth: 27 August 1998 (age 28)
- Place of birth: Paris, France
- Height: 1.77 m (5 ft 10 in)
- Positions: Defender; midfielder

Team information
- Current team: Sassuolo
- Number: 4

Senior career*
| Years | Team | Apps | (Gls) |
| 2018–2019 | Metz | 34 | (0) |
| 2020–2024 | Dijon | 56 | (0) |
| 2024–2025 | Guingamp | 21 | (0) |
| 2025– | Sassuolo | 3 | (0) |

International career
| 2015 | France U17 | 10 | (1) |
| 2017 | France U19 | 9 | (1) |
| 2017–2018 | France U20 | 4 | (1) |
| 2021 | France U23 | 1 | (0) |
- * Club domestic league appearances and goals as of 17:48, 21 December 2025 (UTC)

Hélène Jeanne Claudette Fercocq (born 27 August 1998) is a French professional footballer who plays as a defender or midfielder for Italian Serie A club Sassuolo.

== Club career ==
Fercocq made her league debut against Bordeaux on 30 October 2018.

On 17 June 2020, Fercocq was announced at Dijon on a two year contract. She made her league debut against Issy on 12 September 2020. On 9 December 2023, she played her 100th D1 match against Bordeaux.

On 22 July 2024, Fercocq was announced at Guingamp. She made her league debut against Paris FC on 22 September 2024.

In July 2025, Fercocq signed for Italian Serie A club Sassuolo.

== International career ==
Fercocq took part in the U20 World Cup. During the tournament, she scored against Ghana U20s on 5 August 2018, scoring in the 27th minute.

On 22 March 2022, Fercocq was called up to the French U23s for two matches against Belgium U23s.

== Style of play ==
Fercocq enjoys playing as a defensive midfielder, but can also play as a centre midfielder.

== Personal life ==
Fercocq is studying accounting and management.
