= Natalia Montilla =

Spanish footballer (born 1998)

Natalia Montilla Martínez (born October 18, 1998) is a Spanish footballer who plays as a midfielder for Real Betis.

== Early life ==
Montilla started playing football at the age of four. She is a native of Córdoba, Spain.

== Career ==
Montilla played futsal.

== Style of play ==
Montilla mainly operates as a midfielder and has been described as "stands out for her mental speed to make the right decision at every moment of the game. She tap, tap and more tap to kill on the last pass. Her undoubted quality allows her to assist her teammates with excellence, but she also runs and presses in defense like no other".

== Personal life ==
Montilla is the daughter of Spanish footballer Francisco Montilla. She has a brother.
