= 2016 UEFA Women's Under-19 Championship qualification =

Tournament details
- Dates: Qualifying round: 15–20 September 2015; Elite round: 5–10 April 2016
- Teams: 46 (from 1 confederation)

Tournament statistics
- Matches played: 102
- Goals scored: 435 (4.26 per match)
- Top scorer: (Netherlands) Sippie Folkertsma (9 goals)

The 2016 UEFA Women's Under-19 Championship qualification was a women's under-19 football competition organised by UEFA to determine the seven national teams joining the automatically qualified hosts Slovakia in the 2016 UEFA Women's Under-19 Championship final tournament.

A total of 46 national teams entered this qualifying competition, which was played in two rounds between September 2015 and April 2016. Players born on or after 1 January 1997 were eligible to participate.

== Format ==
The qualifying competition consisted of two rounds:

- Qualifying round: Apart from England and Spain, which received byes to the elite round as the two teams with the highest seeding coefficient, the remaining 44 teams were drawn into 11 groups of four teams. Each group was played in single round-robin format at one of the teams selected as hosts after the draw. The 11 group winners and the 11 runners-up advanced to the elite round.
- Elite round: The 24 teams were drawn into six groups of four teams. Each group was played in single round-robin format at one of the teams selected as hosts after the draw. The six group winners and the runner-up with the best record against the first and third-placed teams in their group qualified for the final tournament.

=== Tiebreakers ===
The teams were ranked according to points (3 points for a win, 1 point for a draw, 0 points for a loss). If two or more teams were equal on points on completion of a mini-tournament, the following tie-breaking criteria were applied, in the order given, to determine the rankings:

1. Higher number of points obtained in the mini-tournament matches played among the teams in question;
2. Superior goal difference resulting from the mini-tournament matches played among the teams in question;
3. Higher number of goals scored in the mini-tournament matches played among the teams in question;
4. If, after having applied criteria 1 to 3, teams still had an equal ranking, criteria 1 to 3 were reapplied exclusively to the mini-tournament matches between the teams in question to determine their final rankings. If this procedure did not lead to a decision, criteria 5 to 9 applied;
5. Superior goal difference in all mini-tournament matches;
6. Higher number of goals scored in all mini-tournament matches;
7. If only two teams had the same number of points, and they were tied according to criteria 1 to 6 after having met in the last round of the mini-tournament, their rankings were determined by a penalty shoot-out (not used if more than two teams had the same number of points, or if their rankings were not relevant for qualification for the next stage).
8. Lower disciplinary points total based only on yellow and red cards received in the mini-tournament matches (red card = 3 points, yellow card = 1 point, expulsion for two yellow cards in one match = 3 points);
9. Drawing of lots.

To determine the best runner-up from the elite round, the results against the teams in fourth place were discarded. The following criteria were applied:

1. Higher number of points;
2. Superior goal difference;
3. Higher number of goals scored;
4. Lower disciplinary points total based only on yellow and red cards received (red card = 3 points, yellow card = 1 point, expulsion for two yellow cards in one match = 3 points);
5. Drawing of lots.

== Qualifying round ==
=== Draw ===
The draw for the qualifying round was held on 19 November 2014, 10:15 CET (UTC+1), at the UEFA headquarters in Nyon, Switzerland.

The teams were seeded according to their coefficient ranking, calculated based on the following:

- 2012 UEFA Women's Under-19 Championship final tournament and qualifying competition (qualifying round and elite round)
- 2013 UEFA Women's Under-19 Championship final tournament and qualifying competition (qualifying round and elite round)
- 2014 UEFA Women's Under-19 Championship final tournament and qualifying competition (qualifying round and elite round)

Each group contained one team from Pot A, one team from Pot B, one team from Pot C, and one team from Pot D. For political reasons, Russia and Ukraine (due to the Russian military intervention in Ukraine) could not be drawn in the same group.

Bye to elite round
Team	Coeff	Rank
England	14.667	1
Spain	12.000	2

Pot A
Team	Coeff	Rank
Sweden	11.833	3
France	11.667	4
Germany	11.333	5
Norway	10.333	6
Denmark	9.500	7
Finland	9.000	8
Belgium	8.833	9
Scotland	8.667	10
Republic of Ireland	8.500	11
Netherlands	8.000	12
Switzerland	7.500	13

Pot B
Team	Coeff	Rank
Portugal	7.000	14
Czech Republic	6.667	15
Serbia	6.667	16
Romania	6.167	17
Italy	6.167	18
Austria	6.000	19
Iceland	6.000	20
Russia	5.167	21
Northern Ireland	4.833	22
Wales	4.500	23
Poland	4.333	24

Pot C
Team	Coeff	Rank
Turkey	4.333	25
Ukraine	4.333	26
Hungary	4.333	27
Greece	4.000	28
Croatia	3.833	29
Slovenia	3.667	30
Bosnia and Herzegovina	3.000	31
Macedonia	2.000	32
Cyprus	1.667	33
Belarus	1.500	34
Estonia	1.333	35

Pot D
Team	Coeff	Rank
Faroe Islands	1.333	36
Bulgaria	1.000	37
Azerbaijan	1.000	38
Moldova	0.667	39
Latvia	0.000	40
Lithuania	0.000	41
Israel	0.000	42
Kazakhstan	0.000	43
Montenegro	0.000	44
Georgia	0.000	45
Albania	0.000	46

Notes

- Slovakia (Coeff: 2.333) qualified automatically for the final tournament as hosts.
- Andorra, Armenia, Gibraltar, Liechtenstein, Luxembourg, Malta, and San Marino did not enter.

=== Groups ===
All times were CEST (UTC+2).

==== Group 1 ====
Switzerland's 23–0 win against Georgia was the biggest margin in competition history.

Pos	Team	Pld	W	D	L	GF	GA	GD	Pts	Qualification
1	Switzerland (H)	3	3	0	0	32	0	+32	9	Elite round
2	Greece	3	2	0	1	9	8	+1	6	Elite round
3	Iceland	3	1	0	2	7	5	+2	3	
4	Georgia	3	0	0	3	1	36	−35	0	

Source: UEFA
Rules for classification: Qualification tiebreakers
(H) Hosts
15 September 2015
15:00

Iceland	6–1	Georgia
Magnúsdóttir 3'; Thorisson 34'; H. Arnarsdóttir 39'; I. Sigurdardóttir 69', 73'; Thórólfsdóttir 90+3'	Report	Nakvetauri 40'

Colovray Sports Centre, Nyon
Referee: Henrikke Nervik (Norway)
15 September 2015
18:00

Switzerland	7–0	Greece
Stierli 24'; Widmer 28'; Glaser 44', 71', 90'; Hurni 45+1'; Imhof 62'	Report

Colovray Sports Centre, Nyon
Referee: Ana Minić (Serbia)

17 September 2015
15:00

Greece	2–1	Iceland
Sarri 44', 88'	Report	I. Sigurdardóttir 65'

Colovray Sports Centre, Nyon
Referee: Henrikke Nervik (Norway)
17 September 2015
18:00

Switzerland	23–0	Georgia
Stierli 2'; Glaser 5', 13', 23', 45+1'; Ramseier 8', 50', 68' (pen.), 71', 80'; Peromingo 22', 39', 45', 73'; Hoti 25', 42'; Baumann 36'; Imhof 53', 61', 74', 86'; Widmer 83', 89'	Report

Colovray Sports Centre, Nyon
Referee: Irina Turovskaya (Belarus)

20 September 2015
15:00

Iceland	0–2	Switzerland
	Report	Hofmann 20'; Widmer 81'

Colovray Sports Centre, Nyon
Referee: Ana Minić (Serbia)
20 September 2015
15:00

Georgia	0–7	Greece
	Report	Kaldaridou 34'; Moraitou 38'; Sarri 53', 86'; Zerva 64', 75'; Chkhartishvili 66' (o.g.)

Colovray Sports Centre, Nyon
Referee: Irina Turovskaya (Belarus)

==== Group 2 ====
Pos	Team	Pld	W	D	L	GF	GA	GD	Pts	Qualification
1	France	3	3	0	0	15	0	+15	9	Elite round
2	Czech Republic	3	2	0	1	9	7	+2	6	Elite round
3	Bosnia and Herzegovina (H)	3	1	0	2	1	7	−6	3	
4	Faroe Islands	3	0	0	3	1	12	−11	0	

Source: UEFA
Rules for classification: Qualification tiebreakers
(H) Hosts
15 September 2015
16:00

France	2–0	Bosnia and Herzegovina
D. Cascarino 54'; Clerac 86'	Report

Stadion Etno Selo Stanišići, Bijeljina
Referee: Barbara Bollenberg (Austria)
15 September 2015
16:00

Czech Republic	4–1	Faroe Islands
Szewieczková 49'; Chlumová 50'; Křivská 77'; Skálová 83'	Report	Simonsen 54'

Gradski stadion, Bijeljina
Referee: Justina Lavrenovaite (Lithuania)

17 September 2015
16:00

France	7–0	Faroe Islands
Uffren 5', 90+5'; Clerac 9'; Legrout 15'; Pugnetti 45+4', 90'; Matéo 69'	Report

Gradski stadion, Bijeljina
Referee: Nelli Stepanyan (Armenia)
17 September 2015
16:00

Bosnia and Herzegovina	0–5	Czech Republic
	Report	Veselá 49'; Houzarová 57'; Szewieczková 59' (pen.); Křivská 72'; Stárová 90+1'

Stadion Etno Selo Stanišići, Bijeljina
Referee: Justina Lavrenovaite (Lithuania)

20 September 2015
16:00

Czech Republic	0–6	France
	Report	D. Cascarino 32'; Matéo 35'; Lahmari 52', 68'; Geyoro 61'; Pugnetti 80'

Stadion Etno Selo Stanišići, Bijeljina
Referee: Barbara Bollenberg (Austria)
20 September 2015
16:00

Faroe Islands	0–1	Bosnia and Herzegovina
	Report	Mujkić 13'

Gradski stadion, Bijeljina
Referee: Nelli Stepanyan (Armenia)

==== Group 3 ====
Pos	Team	Pld	W	D	L	GF	GA	GD	Pts	Qualification
1	Azerbaijan	3	3	0	0	9	2	+7	9	Elite round
2	Belgium	3	2	0	1	10	3	+7	6	Elite round
3	Croatia	3	1	0	2	4	8	−4	3	
4	Wales (H)	3	0	0	3	3	13	−10	0	

Source: UEFA
Rules for classification: Qualification tiebreakers
(H) Hosts
15 September 2015
13:00

Wales	1–4	Azerbaijan
Holland 22'	Report	Bakarandze 24'; Relea 34', 72'; Jalilli 62'

Park Hall, Oswestry
Referee: Ana Aguiar (Portugal)
15 September 2015
17:00

Belgium	4–0	Croatia
Drezga 45+2' (o.g.); Velde 61'; Baldewijns 68'; Awete 90+5'	Report

Park Hall, Oswestry
Referee: Ivana Projkovska (Macedonia)

17 September 2015
13:00

Croatia	3–2	Wales
Bošnjak 10'; Mihić 22'; Radoš 68'	Report	Holland 38'; Estcourt 56'

Park Hall, Oswestry
Referee: Ana Aguiar (Portugal)
17 September 2015
17:00

Belgium	0–3	Azerbaijan
	Report	Relea 29', 45'; Aliyeva 67'

Park Hall, Oswestry
Referee: Katarzyna Lisiecka-Sęk (Poland)

20 September 2015
12:00

Wales	0–6	Belgium
	Report	Awete 16'; Guns 45+1'; Maximus 66', 78'; Velde 81'; Iliano 90+3'

Park Hall, Oswestry
Referee: Ivana Projkovska (Macedonia)
20 September 2015
12:00

Azerbaijan	2–1	Croatia
Jalilli 9'; Relea 61'	Report	Drezga 11'

The Airfield, Broughton
Referee: Katarzyna Lisiecka-Sęk (Poland)

==== Group 4 ====
Pos	Team	Pld	W	D	L	GF	GA	GD	Pts	Qualification
1	Finland (H)	3	3	0	0	16	3	+13	9	Elite round
2	Poland	3	2	0	1	12	7	+5	6	Elite round
3	Turkey	3	1	0	2	1	5	−4	3	
4	Lithuania	3	0	0	3	0	14	−14	0	

Source: UEFA
Rules for classification: Qualification tiebreakers
(H) Hosts
15 September 2015
12:00

Poland	5–0	Lithuania
Ostrowska 13'; Kaminska 17'; Lefeld 19'; Jerzak 25', 51'	Report

Eerikkilä Areena, Tammela
Referee: Graziella Pirriatore (Italy)
15 September 2015
16:00

Finland	1–0	Turkey
Collin 49'	Report

Eerikkilä Areena, Tammela
Referee: Vesna Budimir (Croatia)

17 September 2015
14:00

Finland	8–0	Lithuania
Collin 3', 63'; Kollanen 11', 14', 49', 80', 89'; Bröijer 90+3'	Report

Eerikkilä Areena, Tammela
Referee: Liudmyla Telbukh (Ukraine)
17 September 2015
18:00

Turkey	0–4	Poland
	Report	Michalczyk 58'; Grabowska 81'; Cieśla 86'; Mesjasz 90+1'

Eerikkilä Areena, Tammela
Referee: Graziella Pirriatore (Italy)

20 September 2015
14:00

Poland	3–7	Finland
Grabowska 6'; Jędrzejewicz 79'; Ostrowska 84'	Report	Kuoksa 8', 49', 86'; Kollanen 26', 65'; Roth 40'; Miettunen 71'

Kaurialan kenttä, Hämeenlinna
Referee: Vesna Budimir (Croatia)
20 September 2015
14:00

Lithuania	0–1	Turkey
	Report	Sivrikaya 84'

Eerikkilä Areena, Tammela
Referee: Liudmyla Telbukh (Ukraine)

==== Group 5 ====
Pos	Team	Pld	W	D	L	GF	GA	GD	Pts	Qualification
1	Germany	3	3	0	0	15	1	+14	9	Elite round
2	Hungary (H)	3	2	0	1	6	2	+4	6	Elite round
3	Serbia	3	1	0	2	3	7	−4	3	
4	Kazakhstan	3	0	0	3	0	14	−14	0	

Source: UEFA
Rules for classification: Qualification tiebreakers
(H) Hosts
15 September 2015
16:00

Germany	2–0	Hungary
Sanders 61', 83'	Report

Király Sportlétesítmény, Szombathely
Referee: Vivian Peeters (Netherlands)
15 September 2015
16:00

Serbia	2–0	Kazakhstan
Stefanović 82'; Pantelić 88'	Report

Sportcentrum Bük, Bük
Referee: Lois Otte (Belgium)

17 September 2015
16:00

Germany	7–0	Kazakhstan
Zakaryayeva 31' (o.g.); Ott 34', 41'; Walkling 47', 56'; Gasper 51'; Sanders 80'	Report

Sportcentrum Bük, Bük
Referee: Tanja Subotič (Slovenia)
17 September 2015
16:00

Hungary	1–0	Serbia
Farádi-Szabó 40'	Report

Király Sportlétesítmény, Szombathely
Referee: Lois Otte (Belgium)

20 September 2015
16:00

Serbia	1–6	Germany
Pantelić 57'	Report	Walkling 2', 9'; Sanders 27', 55'; Ott 30'; Schwalm 90+1'

Király Sportlétesítmény, Szombathely
Referee: Vivian Peeters (Netherlands)
20 September 2015
16:00

Kazakhstan	0–5	Hungary
	Report	Kaján 16', 35'; Szakonyi 40'; Gelb 44'; Turányi 73'

Sportcentrum Bük, Bük
Referee: Tanja Subotič (Slovenia)

==== Group 6 ====
Pos	Team	Pld	W	D	L	GF	GA	GD	Pts	Qualification
1	Sweden	3	3	0	0	12	0	+12	9	Elite round
2	Northern Ireland	3	1	1	1	5	4	+1	4	Elite round
3	Montenegro	3	1	1	1	4	6	−2	4	
4	Macedonia (H)	3	0	0	3	1	12	−11	0	

Source: UEFA
Rules for classification: Qualification tiebreakers
(H) Hosts
15 September 2015
11:00

Sweden	3–0	Macedonia
Löfqvist 41'; Björn 74'; Persson 88'	Report

Boris Trajkovski Stadium, Skopje
Referee: Zuzana Štrpková (Slovakia)
15 September 2015
11:00

Northern Ireland	0–0	Montenegro
	Report

Training Centre Petar Miloševski, Skopje
Referee: Eliska Kramlova (Czech Republic)

17 September 2015
11:00

Sweden	5–0	Montenegro
Zigiotti Olme 2'; Löfqvist 23'; M. Micunović 45+3' (o.g.); Blomqvist 49'; Angeldal 54' (pen.)	Report

Training Centre Petar Miloševski, Skopje
Referee: Elvira Nurmustafina (Kazakhstan)
17 September 2015
11:00

Macedonia	0–5	Northern Ireland
	Report	McGlade 7'; Nikolovska 11' (o.g.); McGivern 45+1'; T. Burns 89'; Kelly 90+3'

Boris Trajkovski Stadium, Skopje
Referee: Eliska Kramlova (Czech Republic)

20 September 2015
11:00

Northern Ireland	0–4	Sweden
	Report	Persson 18'; Göthberg 81'; Anvegård 83', 88'

Training Centre Petar Miloševski, Skopje
Referee: Zuzana Štrpková (Slovakia)
20 September 2015
11:00

Montenegro	4–1	Macedonia
Bojat 10', 89' (pen.); M. Knezević 16'; Božić 70'	Report	Bojku 61'

Boris Trajkovski Stadium, Skopje
Referee: Elvira Nurmustafina (Kazakhstan)

==== Group 7 ====
Pos	Team	Pld	W	D	L	GF	GA	GD	Pts	Qualification
1	Netherlands (H)	3	2	1	0	22	1	+21	7	Elite round
2	Italy	3	2	1	0	21	1	+20	7	Elite round
3	Moldova	3	1	0	2	2	22	−20	3	
4	Cyprus	3	0	0	3	1	22	−21	0	

Source: UEFA
Rules for classification: Qualification tiebreakers
(H) Hosts
15 September 2015
17:30

Italy	9–0	Moldova
Marinelli 10'; Bergamaschi 18', 51', 68', 90'; Simonetti 24', 50' (pen.); Vigilucci 36'; Piemonte 70'	Report

Sportpark Skoatterwâld, Heerenveen
Referee: Angelika Soeder (Germany)
15 September 2015
19:30

Netherlands	9–0	Cyprus
Hendriks 2', 21'; Folkertsma 16', 37' (pen.), 40'; Raaijmakers 26', 28'; Van den Goorbergh 48'; Noordam 67'	Report

Sportpark Marsdijk, Assen
Referee: Tania Fernandes Morais (Luxembourg)

17 September 2015
17:30

Cyprus	0–11	Italy
	Report	Antoniou 8' (o.g.); Marinelli 30', 62', 66'; Mella 41', 69'; Mascarello 55' (pen.), 76'; Serturini 85'; Pisani 88'; Mellano 90+1'

Sportpark Skoatterwâld, Heerenveen
Referee: Angelika Soeder (Germany)
17 September 2015
19:30

Netherlands	12–0	Moldova
Van Velzen 29', 84'; Admiraal 38'; Sanders 45+4'; Noordam 50'; Verhoeve 60', 75', 90+5'; Koster 69', 78'; Van der Linden 82' (pen.); Raaijmakers 90+2'	Report

Sportpark Marsdijk, Assen
Referee: Sabayel Gurbanova (Azerbaijan)

20 September 2015
14:30

Italy	1–1	Netherlands
Boattin 66'	Report	Raaijmakers 27'

Sportpark Skoatterwâld, Heerenveen
Referee: Tania Fernandes Morais (Luxembourg)
20 September 2015
14:30

Moldova	2–1	Cyprus
Arnautu 80'; Culcițchi 89'	Report	Demetriou 54' (pen.)

Sportpark Marsdijk, Assen
Referee: Sabayel Gurbanova (Azerbaijan)

==== Group 8 ====
Pos	Team	Pld	W	D	L	GF	GA	GD	Pts	Qualification
1	Norway	3	2	1	0	15	2	+13	7	Elite round
2	Portugal (H)	3	2	1	0	8	3	+5	7	Elite round
3	Israel	3	0	1	2	3	11	−8	1	
4	Estonia	3	0	1	2	2	12	−10	1	

Source: UEFA
Rules for classification: Qualification tiebreakers
(H) Hosts
15 September 2015
16:00

Norway	6–0	Estonia
Kvernvolden 3', 43', 53'; Hasund 4', 38'; Døvle 18'	Report

Estádio Municipal de Seia, Seia
Referee: Lorraine Clark (Scotland)
15 September 2015
17:00

Portugal	2–1	Israel
Amado 20'; Cristo 79'	Report	Sofer 64'

Estádio Municipal Serra da Esgalhada, Fornos de Algodres
Referee: Vera Opeykina (Russia)

17 September 2015
16:00

Norway	7–0	Israel
Døvle 14'; Hiim 38'; Fjelldal 49', 72'; Lie 53'; Hansen 56' (pen.); Kvernvolden 88'	Report

Estádio Municipal da Guarda, Guarda
Referee: Ivana Vlaić (Bosnia and Herzegovina)
17 September 2015
17:00

Estonia	0–4	Portugal
	Report	I. Silva 27'; Cristo 46'; Amado 51'; Cordeiro 90'

Estádio Municipal de Seia, Seia
Referee: Vera Opeykina (Russia)

20 September 2015
17:00

Portugal	2–2	Norway
Cardoso 4'; Cristo 16'	Report	Fjelldal 74', 80'

Estádio Municipal da Guarda, Guarda
Referee: Lorraine Clark (Scotland)
20 September 2015
17:00

Israel	2–2	Estonia
Cabrera 40'; Avital 54'	Report	Tereštšenkova 80', 88'

Estádio Municipal Serra da Esgalhada, Fornos de Algodres
Referee: Ivana Vlaić (Bosnia and Herzegovina)

==== Group 9 ====
Pos	Team	Pld	W	D	L	GF	GA	GD	Pts	Qualification
1	Denmark	3	3	0	0	11	1	+10	9	Elite round
2	Belarus (H)	3	2	0	1	11	3	+8	6	Elite round
3	Romania	3	1	0	2	9	4	+5	3	
4	Latvia	3	0	0	3	0	23	−23	0	

Source: UEFA
Rules for classification: Qualification tiebreakers
(H) Hosts
15 September 2015
15:00

Denmark	2–1	Belarus
Hansen 6'; Henriksen 25'	Report	Kazakevich 64'

City Stadium, Orsha
Attendance: 2100
Referee: Ivana Martinčić (Croatia)
15 September 2015
15:00

Romania	8–0	Latvia
Ciolacu 17', 44', 58'; Vasile 25', 30'; Ambruș 34'; Popa 54'; Barabași 82' (pen.)	Report

Spartak Stadium, Mogilev
Attendance: 900
Referee: Sarah Garratt (England)

17 September 2015
15:00

Denmark	8–0	Latvia
Sørensen 7', 17', 29', 37'; Hansen 20', 61'; Henriksen 24'; Jørup 72'	Report

Spartak Stadium, Mogilev
Attendance: 400
Referee: Galiya Echeva (Bulgaria)
17 September 2015
15:00

Belarus	3–1	Romania
Sergeychik 16', 28'; Dranovskaya 51'	Report	Popa 63'

City Stadium, Orsha
Attendance: 1400
Referee: Sarah Garratt (England)

20 September 2015
15:00

Romania	0–1	Denmark
	Report	Henriksen 22'

Spartak Stadium, Mogilev
Attendance: 500
Referee: Ivana Martinčić (Croatia)
20 September 2015
15:00

Latvia	0–7	Belarus
	Report	Shuppo 12', 63', 72', 90'; Dranovskaya 17', 52'; Kazakevich 64'

City Stadium, Orsha
Attendance: 1300
Referee: Galiya Echeva (Bulgaria)

==== Group 10 ====
Pos	Team	Pld	W	D	L	GF	GA	GD	Pts	Qualification
1	Russia	3	3	0	0	13	2	+11	9	Elite round
2	Republic of Ireland	3	2	0	1	10	2	+8	6	Elite round
3	Slovenia (H)	3	1	0	2	4	10	−6	3	
4	Bulgaria	3	0	0	3	0	13	−13	0	

Source: UEFA
Rules for classification: Qualification tiebreakers
(H) Hosts
15 September 2015
16:00

Republic of Ireland	3–0 Awarded	Slovenia
Connolly 30'	Report	Kolbl 84'

Stadion Gornja Radgona, Gornja Radgona
Referee: Marta Frias Acedo (Spain)

The match was completed with a 1–1 scoreline before a 3–0 default victory was awarded to the Republic of Ireland due to Slovenia fielding an ineligible player.

15 September 2015
16:00

Russia	4–0	Bulgaria
Fedorova 36', 66', 85'; Andreeva 38'	Report

Stadion Bakovci, Bakovci
Referee: Melis Özçiğdem (Turkey)

17 September 2015
16:00

Republic of Ireland	6–0	Bulgaria
Connolly 9', 55', 79' (pen.), 83'; McCarthy 12'; J. Nolan 65'	Report

Stadion Gornja Radgona, Gornja Radgona
Referee: Cristina Bujor (Romania)
17 September 2015
16:00

Slovenia	1–7	Russia
Jelen 37'	Report	Andreeva 6', 84'; Fedorova 17', 59', 63' (pen.); Mashina 54', 84'

Stadion Bakovci, Bakovci
Referee: Melis Özçiğdem (Turkey)

20 September 2015
16:00

Russia	2–1	Republic of Ireland
Andreeva 56'; Fedorova 71'	Report	J. Nolan 4'

Stadion Gornja Radgona, Gornja Radgona
Referee: Marta Frias Acedo (Spain)
20 September 2015
16:00

Bulgaria	0–3	Slovenia
	Report	Kolbl 58', 59'; Godina 76'

Stadion Bakovci, Bakovci
Referee: Cristina Bujor (Romania)

==== Group 11 ====
Pos	Team	Pld	W	D	L	GF	GA	GD	Pts	Qualification
1	Scotland	3	3	0	0	9	5	+4	9	Elite round
2	Austria (H)	3	2	0	1	10	3	+7	6	Elite round
3	Ukraine	3	1	0	2	5	5	0	3	
4	Albania	3	0	0	3	4	15	−11	0	

Source: UEFA
Rules for classification: Qualification tiebreakers
(H) Hosts
15 September 2015
11:00

Scotland	3–2	Ukraine
Harrison 17'; Cuthbert 47'; Tweedie 75'	Report	Lymar 41'; Matviyishyn 90+4'

Sportschule Lindabrunn, Enzesfeld-Lindabrunn
Referee: Viola Raudziņa (Latvia)
15 September 2015
18:00

Austria	8–1	Albania
Lackner 5', 14', 90'; Dunst 41', 68'; Naschenweng 56'; Wasserbauer 59', 65'	Report	Gjegji 85'

Sportarena Bad Erlach, Bad Erlach
Referee: Tess Petersson (Sweden)

17 September 2015
11:00

Scotland	4–2	Albania
Tweedie 9'; Howat 20'; Hanson 41'; Boyce 74'	Report	Franja 25'; Gjegji 45+3'

Sportschule Lindabrunn, Enzesfeld-Lindabrunn
Referee: Viola Raudziņa (Latvia)
17 September 2015
18:00

Ukraine	0–1	Austria
	Report	Pinther 87' (pen.)

Sportarena Bad Erlach, Bad Erlach
Referee: Tess Petersson (Sweden)

20 September 2015
17:00

Austria	1–2	Scotland
Egretzberger 23'	Report	Tweedie 22'; Cuthbert 35'

Sportarena Bad Erlach, Bad Erlach
Referee: Viola Raudziņa (Latvia)
20 September 2015
17:00

Albania	1–3	Ukraine
Behluli 90+1'	Report	Budaieva 43'; Polyukhovych 45+1'; Kadolli 67' (o.g.)

Stadt Sportanlage, Sankt Pölten
Referee: Tess Petersson (Sweden)

== Elite round ==
=== Draw ===
The draw for the elite round was held on 13 November 2015, 11:00 CET (UTC+1), at the UEFA headquarters in Nyon, Switzerland.

The teams were seeded according to their results in the qualifying round. England and Spain, which received byes to the elite round, were automatically seeded into Pot A. Each group contained one team from Pot A, one team from Pot B, one team from Pot C, and one team from Pot D. Teams from the same qualifying round group could not be drawn in the same group.

Pos	Grp	Team	Pld	W	D	L	GF	GA	GD	Pts	Seeding
1	—	England	0	0	0	0	0	0	0	0	Pot A
2	—	Spain	0	0	0	0	0	0	0	0	Pot A
3	1	Switzerland	3	3	0	0	32	0	+32	9	Pot A
4	2	France	3	3	0	0	15	0	+15	9	Pot A
5	5	Germany	3	3	0	0	15	1	+14	9	Pot A
6	4	Finland	3	3	0	0	16	3	+13	9	Pot A
7	6	Sweden	3	3	0	0	12	0	+12	9	Pot B
8	10	Russia	3	3	0	0	13	2	+11	9	Pot B
9	9	Denmark	3	3	0	0	11	1	+10	9	Pot B
10	3	Azerbaijan	3	3	0	0	9	2	+7	9	Pot B
11	11	Scotland	3	3	0	0	9	5	+4	9	Pot B
12	7	Netherlands	3	2	1	0	22	1	+21	7	Pot B
13	7	Italy	3	2	1	0	21	1	+20	7	Pot C
14	8	Norway	3	2	1	0	15	2	+13	7	Pot C
15	8	Portugal	3	2	1	0	8	3	+5	7	Pot C
16	9	Belarus	3	2	0	1	11	3	+8	6	Pot C
17	10	Republic of Ireland	3	2	0	1	10	2	+8	6	Pot C
18	11	Austria	3	2	0	1	10	3	+7	6 (Note: Tie broken by disciplinary points.)	Pot C
19	3	Belgium	3	2	0	1	10	3	+7	6	Pot D
20	4	Poland	3	2	0	1	12	7	+5	6	Pot D
21	5	Hungary	3	2	0	1	6	2	+4	6	Pot D
22	2	Czech Republic	3	2	0	1	9	7	+2	6	Pot D
23	1	Greece	3	2	0	1	9	8	+1	6	Pot D
24	6	Northern Ireland	3	1	1	1	5	4	+1	4	Pot D

Source: UEFA
Rules for classification: 1) points; 2) goal difference; 3) goals scored; 4) disciplinary points; 5) coefficient; 6) drawing of lots.

=== Groups ===
All times were CEST (UTC+2).

==== Group 1 ====
Pos	Team	Pld	W	D	L	GF	GA	GD	Pts	Qualification
1	Germany	3	3	0	0	9	2	+7	9	Final tournament
2	Republic of Ireland (H)	3	2	0	1	5	1	+4	6	
3	Poland	3	0	1	2	1	5	−4	1	
4	Azerbaijan	3	0	1	2	1	8	−7	1	

Source: UEFA
Rules for classification: Qualification tiebreakers
(H) Hosts
5 April 2016
15:00

Azerbaijan	0–0	Poland
	Report

Carlisle Grounds, Bray
Referee: Ana Minić (Serbia)
5 April 2016
20:30

Germany	1–0	Republic of Ireland
Schwalm 31'	Report

Tallaght Stadium, Dublin
Referee: Lois Otte (Belgium)

7 April 2016
15:00

Germany	3–1	Poland
Ehegötz 73', 90+4'; Gieseke 78'	Report	Wierzbicka 51'

UCD Bowl, Dublin
Referee: Eleni Antoniou (Greece)
7 April 2016
20:30

Republic of Ireland	3–0	Azerbaijan
McLaughlin 15'; H. Nolan 59' (pen.); Prior 70'	Report

Tallaght Stadium, Dublin
Referee: Ana Minić (Serbia)

10 April 2016
15:00

Azerbaijan	1–5	Germany
Aliyeva 28'	Report	Gasper 31'; Hartig 61'; Gieseke 75', 78'; Schwalm 80'

Tolka Park, Dublin
Referee: Lois Otte (Belgium)
10 April 2016
15:00

Poland	0–2	Republic of Ireland
	Report	H. Nolan 49' (pen.); Beirne 87'

Tallaght Stadium, Dublin
Referee: Eleni Antoniou (Greece)

==== Group 2 ====
Pos	Team	Pld	W	D	L	GF	GA	GD	Pts	Qualification
1	Austria	3	2	0	1	3	1	+2	6	Final tournament
2	Sweden (H)	3	1	1	1	2	2	0	4	
3	England	3	1	1	1	1	1	0	4	
4	Belgium	3	1	0	2	2	4	−2	3	

Source: UEFA
Rules for classification: Qualification tiebreakers
(H) Hosts
5 April 2016
14:30

England	1–0	Austria
George 33'	Report

Linköping Arena, Linköping
Referee: Ivana Martinčić (Croatia)
5 April 2016
18:00

Sweden	2–1	Belgium
Anvegård 38'; Vandenbussche 45+1' (o.g.)	Report	Baldewijns 88'

Linköping Arena, Linköping
Referee: Marta Frias Acedo (Spain)

7 April 2016
14:30

England	0–1	Belgium
	Report	Gorniak 40'

Linköping Arena, Linköping
Referee: Vera Opeykina (Russia)
7 April 2016
18:00

Austria	1–0	Sweden
Kofler 61'	Report

Linköping Arena, Linköping
Referee: Marta Frias Acedo (Spain)

10 April 2016
16:00

Sweden	0–0	England
	Report

Linköping Arena, Linköping
Referee: Ivana Martinčić (Croatia)
10 April 2016
16:00

Belgium	0–2	Austria
	Report	Pinther 35'; Wasserbauer 65'

Nya Parken, Norrköping
Referee: Vera Opeykina (Russia)

==== Group 3 ====
Pos	Team	Pld	W	D	L	GF	GA	GD	Pts	Qualification
1	Netherlands (H)	3	2	1	0	11	3	+8	7	Final tournament
2	Czech Republic	3	2	0	1	6	8	−2	6	
3	Finland	3	1	1	1	4	4	0	4	
4	Belarus	3	0	0	3	1	7	−6	0	

Source: UEFA
Rules for classification: Qualification tiebreakers
(H) Hosts
5 April 2016
15:30

Finland	2–1	Belarus
Laakkonen 14'; Kollanen 28' (pen.)	Report	Vasilyeva 75'

Sportpark De Bijenkamp, Eibergen
Referee: Julia-Stefanie Baier (Austria)
5 April 2016
19:30

Netherlands	7–2	Czech Republic
Majerová 7' (o.g.); Roord 17'; Folkertsma 21', 43', 78' (pen.), 86'; Admiraal 90+1'	Report	Waltrová 60'; Stárová 79' (pen.)

Sportpark De Bijenkorf, Hengelo
Referee: Sarah Garratt (England)

7 April 2016
15:30

Finland	1–2	Czech Republic
Savolainen 2'	Report	Ducháčková 19', 44'

Sportpark De Bijenkamp, Eibergen
Referee: Ana Aguiar (Portugal)
7 April 2016
19:30

Belarus	0–3	Netherlands
	Report	Folkertsma 7'; Van der Wal 52'; Noordam 69'

Sportpark De Bijenkorf, Hengelo
Referee: Sarah Garratt (England)

10 April 2016
14:30

Netherlands	1–1	Finland
Folkertsma 90+3' (pen.)	Report	Collin 53'

Sportpark De Bijenkamp, Eibergen
Referee: Julia-Stefanie Baier (Austria)
10 April 2016
14:30

Czech Republic	2–0	Belarus
Ducháčková 55'; Skálová 80'	Report

Sportpark De Bijenkorf, Hengelo
Referee: Ana Aguiar (Portugal)

==== Group 4 ====
Pos	Team	Pld	W	D	L	GF	GA	GD	Pts	Qualification
1	Spain	3	3	0	0	13	2	+11	9	Final tournament
2	Denmark (H)	3	1	1	1	7	4	+3	4	
3	Italy	3	1	1	1	4	4	0	4	
4	Northern Ireland	3	0	0	3	1	15	−14	0	

Source: UEFA
Rules for classification: Qualification tiebreakers
(H) Hosts
5 April 2016
13:00

Spain	3–0	Italy
García 20'; N. Garrote 61'; Hernández 90+3'	Report

DS Arena, Hobro
Referee: Vivian Peeters (Netherlands)
5 April 2016
15:45

Denmark	5–0	Northern Ireland
Abildå 32', 90+2'; Barut 48'; Frank 78'; Hymøller 84'	Report

Viborg Stadion, Viborg
Referee: Viola Raudziņa (Latvia)

7 April 2016
13:00

Spain	7–1	Northern Ireland
Hernández 20', 86'; García 29', 76'; P. Garrote 33', 58'; Oroz 81'	Report	Holloway 61'

Skive Stadion, Skive
Referee: Cathrine Eide (Norway)
7 April 2016
17:00

Italy	1–1	Denmark
Serturini 70'	Report	Frank 87'

DS Arena, Hobro
Referee: Viola Raudziņa (Latvia)

10 April 2016
15:00

Denmark	1–3	Spain
Krum 90+3'	Report	Oroz 48', 89'; Falcón 79'

Skive Stadion, Skive
Referee: Vivian Peeters (Netherlands)
10 April 2016
15:00

Northern Ireland	0–3	Italy
	Report	Simonetti 38' (pen.); Serturini 52'; Piemonte 90+4'

Viborg Stadion, Viborg
Referee: Cathrine Eide (Norway)

==== Group 5 ====
Pos	Team	Pld	W	D	L	GF	GA	GD	Pts	Qualification
1	France	3	3	0	0	11	0	+11	9	Final tournament
2	Portugal (H)	3	1	1	1	3	4	−1	4	
3	Scotland	3	1	1	1	2	3	−1	4	
4	Greece	3	0	0	3	0	9	−9	0	

Source: UEFA
Rules for classification: Qualification tiebreakers
(H) Hosts
5 April 2016
15:00

Scotland	1–0	Greece
Gallacher 63'	Report

Estádio Municipal Fernando Cabrita, Lagos
Referee: Désirée Grundbacher (Switzerland)
5 April 2016
17:00

France	3–0	Portugal
Condon 42'; Katoto 54'; Clerac 81'	Report

Estádio da Nora, Ferreiras
Referee: Ivana Projkovska (Macedonia)

7 April 2016
15:00

France	6–0	Greece
Katoto 12'; Elisor 30', 45'; Legrout 41'; Matéo 90', 90+2'	Report

Estádio da Nora, Ferreiras
Referee: Valentina Garoffolo (Italy)
7 April 2016
17:00

Portugal	1–1	Scotland
Faria 65'	Report	Brown 21'

Estádio Municipal da Bela Vista, Parchal
Referee: Désirée Grundbacher (Switzerland)

10 April 2016
17:00

Scotland	0–2	France
	Report	Greboval 58'; Geyoro 64'

Estádio Municipal da Bela Vista, Parchal
Referee: Ivana Projkovska (Macedonia)
10 April 2016
17:00

Greece	0–2	Portugal
	Report	Capeta 39'; Seca 53'

Estádio Algarve, Faro-Loulé
Referee: Valentina Garoffolo (Italy)

==== Group 6 ====
Pos	Team	Pld	W	D	L	GF	GA	GD	Pts	Qualification
1	Switzerland	3	2	1	0	7	2	+5	7	Final tournament
2	Norway	3	2	1	0	4	2	+2	7	Final tournament
3	Russia	3	0	1	2	1	3	−2	1	
4	Hungary (H)	3	0	1	2	1	6	−5	1	

Source: UEFA
Rules for classification: Qualification tiebreakers
(H) Hosts
5 April 2016
14:00

Switzerland	2–2	Norway
Zehnder 9'; Mégroz 80' (pen.)	Report	Hansen 48'; Lie 71'

Sportcentrum Bük, Bük
Referee: Barbara Poxhofer (Austria)
5 April 2016
14:00

Russia	1–1	Hungary
Khotyreva 8'	Report	Kaján 56'

Király Sportlétesítmény, Szombathely
Referee: Zuzana Valentová (Slovakia)

7 April 2016
14:00

Switzerland	4–0	Hungary
Zehnder 3', 27'; Widmer 45+1'; Mégroz 82'	Report

Király Sportlétesítmény, Szombathely
Referee: Galiya Echeva (Bulgaria)
7 April 2016
14:00

Norway	1–0	Russia
Døvle 88'	Report

Sportcentrum Bük, Bük
Referee: Zuzana Valentová (Slovakia)

10 April 2016
14:00

Russia	0–1	Switzerland
	Report	Zehnder 59'

Sportcentrum Bük, Bük
Referee: Barbara Poxhofer (Austria)
10 April 2016
14:00

Hungary	0–1	Norway
	Report	Lund 23'

Király Sportlétesítmény, Szombathely
Referee: Galiya Echeva (Bulgaria)

=== Ranking of second-placed teams ===
To determine the best second-placed team from the elite round qualifying for the final tournament, only the results of the second-placed teams against the first and third-placed teams in their group were taken into account.

Pos	Grp	Team	Pld	W	D	L	GF	GA	GD	Pts	Qualification
1	6	Norway	2	1	1	0	3	2	+1	4	Final tournament
2	1	Republic of Ireland	2	1	0	1	2	1	+1	3	
3	3	Czech Republic	2	1	0	1	4	8	−4	3	
4	2	Sweden	2	0	1	1	0	1	−1	1	
5	4	Denmark	2	0	1	1	2	4	−2	1	
6	5	Portugal	2	0	1	1	1	4	−3	1	

Source: UEFA
Rules for classification: 1) points; 2) goal difference; 3) goals scored; 4) disciplinary points; 5) drawing of lots.

== Qualified teams ==
The following eight teams qualified for the final tournament:

Team	Qualified as	Qualified on	Previous appearances in tournament^{1} only U-19 era (since 2002)
Slovakia	Hosts	20 March 2012	0 (debut)
Germany	Elite round Group 1 winners	7 April 2016	12 (**2002**, 2003, 2004, 2005, **2006**, **2007**, 2008, 2009, 2010, **2011**, 2013, 2015)
Austria	Elite round Group 2 winners	10 April 2016	0 (debut)
Netherlands	Elite round Group 3 winners	10 April 2016	5 (2003, 2006, 2010, 2011, **2014**)
Spain	Elite round Group 4 winners	10 April 2016	10 (2002, 2003, **2004**, 2007, 2008, 2010, 2011, 2012, 2014, 2015)
France	Elite round Group 5 winners	10 April 2016	11 (2002, **2003**, 2004, 2005, 2006, 2007, 2008, 2009, **2010**, **2013**, 2015)
Switzerland	Elite round Group 6 winners	10 April 2016	6 (2002, 2004, 2005, 2006, 2009, 2011)
Norway	Elite round best runners-up	10 April 2016	10 (2002, 2003, 2004, 2007, 2008, 2009, 2011, 2013, 2014, 2015)

^{1} Bold indicates champion for that year. Italic indicates host for that year.

== Top goalscorers ==
The following players scored four goals or more in the qualifying competition:

9 goals

- (Netherlands) Sippie Folkertsma

8 goals

- (Finland) Heidi Kollanen

7 goals

- (Russia) Marina Fedorova
- (Switzerland) Julia Glaser

5 goals

- (Azerbaijan) Yaiza Relea
- (Germany) Stefanie Sanders
- (Republic of Ireland) Megan Connolly
- (Switzerland) Céline Imhof
- (Switzerland) Lesley Ramseier
- (Switzerland) Marilena Widmer

4 goals

- (Belarus) Anastasia Shuppo
- (Denmark) Nicoline Sørensen
- (Finland) Kaisa Collin
- (France) Clara Mateo
- (Germany) Ricarda Walkling
- (Greece) Veatriki Sarri
- (Italy) Valentina Bergamaschi
- (Italy) Gloria Marinelli
- (Netherlands) Pleun Raaijmakers
- (Norway) Vilde Fjelldal
- (Norway) Ingrid Kvernvolden
- (Russia) Alena Andreeva
- (Switzerland) Vanessa Peromingo
- (Switzerland) Cinzia Zehnder
