= 2016 UEFA Women's Under-19 Championship =

Majstrovstvá Európy vo futbale žien do 19 rokov 2016

Tournament details
- Host country: Slovakia
- Dates: 19–31 July
- Teams: 8 (from 1 confederation)
- Venues: 4 (in 4 host cities)

Final positions
- Champions: France (4th title)
- Runners-up: Spain

Tournament statistics
- Matches played: 15
- Goals scored: 55 (3.67 per match)
- Attendance: 9,902 (660 per match)
- Top scorer: (France) Marie-Antoinette Katoto (6 goals)
- Best player: (France) Marie-Antoinette Katoto

The 2016 UEFA Women's Under-19 Championship was the 15th edition of the UEFA Women's Under-19 Championship (19th edition if the Under-18 era is included), the annual European international youth football championship contested by the women's under-19 national teams of UEFA member associations. Slovakia, which were selected by UEFA on 20 March 2012, hosted the tournament between 19 and 31 July 2016.

A total of eight teams played in the tournament, with players born on or after 1 January 1997 eligible to participate.

== Qualification ==
The national teams from 47 UEFA member associations entered the competition. With Slovakia automatically qualified as hosts, the other 46 teams contested a qualifying competition to determine the remaining seven spots in the final tournament. The qualifying competition consisted of two rounds: the qualifying round, which took place in autumn 2015, and the elite round, which took place in spring 2016.

=== Qualified teams ===
The following eight teams qualified for the final tournament:

Note: All appearance statistics include only U-19 era (since 2002).

Team	Method of qualification	Finals appearance	Last appearance	Previous best performance
Slovakia	Hosts	1st	—	Debut
Germany	Elite round Group 1 winners	13th	2015	Champions (2002, 2006, 2007, 2011)
Austria	Elite round Group 2 winners	1st	—	Debut
Netherlands	Elite round Group 3 winners	6th	2014	Champions (2014)
Spain	Elite round Group 4 winners	11th	2015	Champions (2004)
France	Elite round Group 5 winners	12th	2015	Champions (2003, 2010, 2013)
Switzerland	Elite round Group 6 winners	7th	2011	Semi-finals (2009, 2011)
Norway	Elite round Group 6 runners-up	11th	2015	Runners-up (2003, 2008, 2011)

Notes

1. The best runners-up among all six elite round groups qualified for the final tournament.

=== Final draw ===
The final draw was held on 24 May 2016, 10:00 CEST (UTC+2), at the Hotel Gate One in Bratislava, Slovakia. The eight teams were drawn into two groups of four teams. There was no seeding, except that hosts Slovakia were assigned to position A1 in the draw.

== Venues ==
The tournament was hosted in four venues:

- NTC Senec, Senec
- Štadión FC ViOn, Zlaté Moravce
- OMS ARENA Senica, Senica
- Stadium Myjava, Myjava

== Squads ==
Each national team had to submit a squad of 18 players.

== Match officials ==
A total of 6 referees, 8 assistant referees and 2 fourth officials were appointed for the final tournament.

Referees

- Linn Andersson (Sweden)
- Tania Fernandes Morais (Luxembourg)
- Ivana Martinčić (Croatia)
- Lois Otte (Belgium)
- (North Macedonia) Ivana Projkovska (Macedonia)
- Eszter Urbán (Hungary)

Assistant referees

- Gulyana Guvandiyeva (Azerbaijan)
- Ekaterina Marinova (Bulgaria)
- Kylie McMullan (Scotland)
- Dora Myrianthea (Cyprus)
- Lisa Rashid (England)
- Maryna Striletska (Ukraine)
- Sabina Valieva (Russia)
- Veronica Vettorel (Italy)

Fourth officials

- Petra Pavlíková Chudá (Slovakia)
- Zuzana Valentová (Slovakia)

== Group stage ==
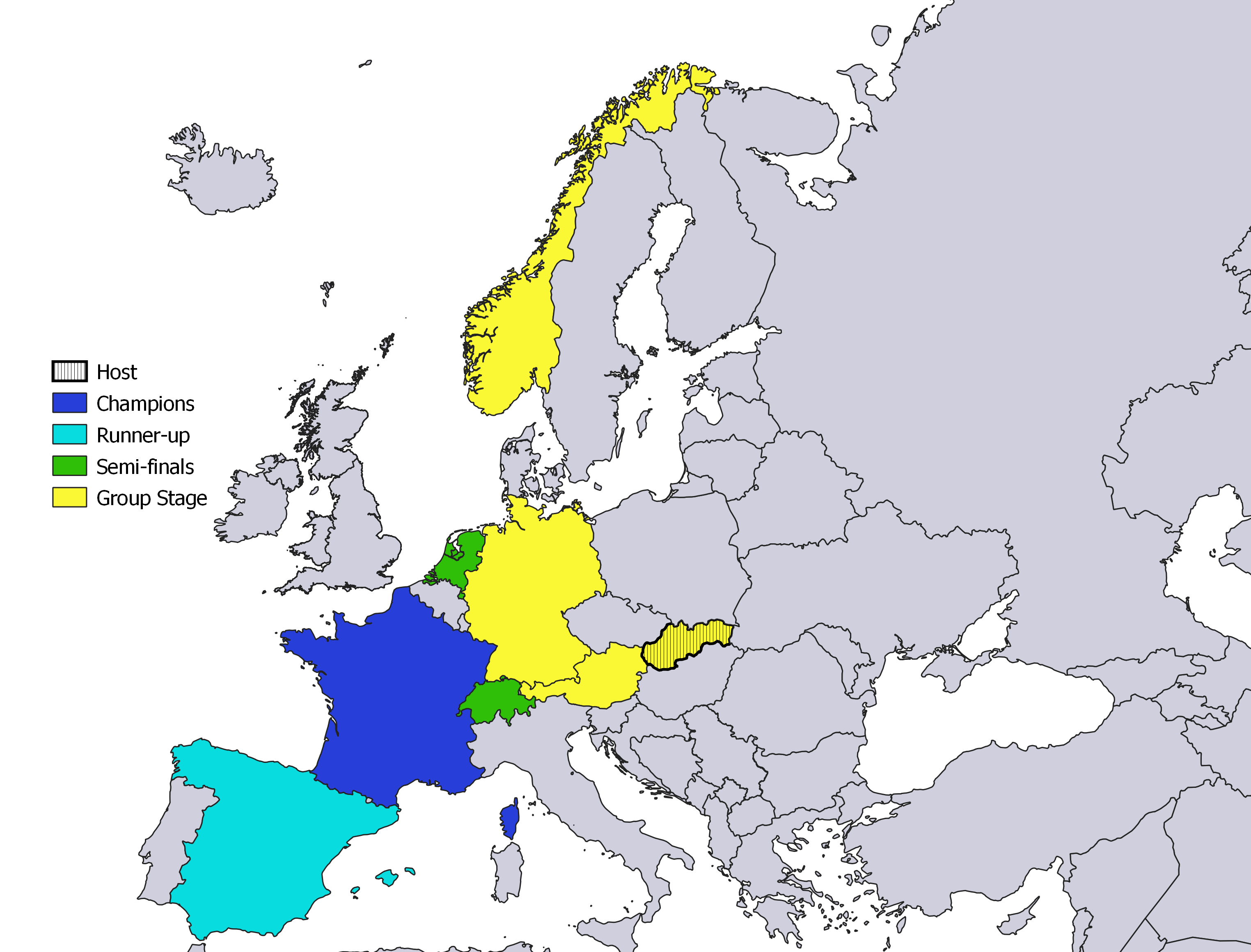
Results of teams participating at the 2016 UEFA Women's Under-17 Championship

The final tournament schedule was confirmed on 1 June 2016.

The group winners and runners-up advanced to the semi-finals.

Tiebreakers

The teams were ranked according to points (3 points for a win, 1 point for a draw, 0 points for a loss). If two or more teams were equal on points on completion of the group matches, the following tie-breaking criteria were applied, in the order given, to determine the rankings:

1. Higher number of points obtained in the group matches played among the teams in question;
2. Superior goal difference resulting from the group matches played among the teams in question;
3. Higher number of goals scored in the group matches played among the teams in question;
4. If, after having applied criteria 1 to 3, teams still had an equal ranking, criteria 1 to 3 were reapplied exclusively to the group matches between the teams in question to determine their final rankings. If this procedure did not lead to a decision, criteria 5 to 9 applied;
5. Superior goal difference in all group matches;
6. Higher number of goals scored in all group matches;
7. If only two teams have the same number of points, and they were tied according to criteria 1 to 6 after having met in the last round of the group stage, their rankings were determined by a penalty shoot-out (not used if more than two teams had the same number of points, or if their rankings were not relevant for qualification for the next stage).
8. Lower disciplinary points total based only on yellow and red cards received in the group matches (red card = 3 points, yellow card = 1 point, expulsion for two yellow cards in one match = 3 points);
9. Drawing of lots.

All times were local, CEST (UTC+2).

=== Group A ===
Pos	Team	Pld	W	D	L	GF	GA	GD	Pts	Qualification
1	France	3	2	0	1	8	2	+6	6 (Note: Head-to-head points: France 3, Netherlands 0.)	Knockout stage
2	Netherlands	3	2	0	1	8	2	+6	6	Knockout stage
3	Norway	3	1	1	1	1	1	0	4	
4	Slovakia (H)	3	0	1	2	0	12	−12	1	

Source: UEFA
Rules for classification: Group stage tiebreakers
(H) Hosts
Notes:
19 July 2016
17:00

Slovakia	0–6	Netherlands
	Report	Folkertsma 23' (pen.); Roord 37', 57', 74'; Deszathová 40' (o.g.); Hendriks 69'

NTC Senec, Senec
Attendance: 1,023
Referee: Ivana Martinčić (Croatia)
19 July 2016
18:00

France	0–1	Norway
	Report	Jørgensen 36'

Štadión FC ViOn, Zlaté Moravce
Attendance: 520
Referee: Eszter Urbán (Hungary)

22 July 2016
18:00

Netherlands	1–0	Norway
Folkertsma 56'	Report

Štadión FC ViOn, Zlaté Moravce
Attendance: 426
Referee: Lois Otte (Belgium)
22 July 2016
19:00

Slovakia	0–6	France
	Report	Katoto 49', 53', 68'; Matéo 51'; Morroni 65'; D. Cascarino 90'

NTC Senec, Senec
Attendance: 1,300
Referee: Ivana Projkovska (Macedonia)

25 July 2016
17:00

Norway	0–0 Abandoned	Slovakia
	Report

Štadión FC ViOn, Zlaté Moravce
Attendance: 1,230
Referee: Linn Andersson (Sweden)

The match was abandoned after 50 minutes with the score 0–0 after heavy rain made the pitch unplayable. With France beating the Netherlands 2–1 elsewhere in the final round of group games, neither Norway nor Slovakia could have finished in the top two and reached the semi-finals. The match was therefore not concluded and the result stands at 0–0.

25 July 2016
17:00

Netherlands	1–2	France
Roord 60'	Report	Katoto 18'; Geyoro 24' (pen.)

NTC Senec, Senec
Attendance: 350
Referee: Tania Fernandes Morais (Luxembourg)

=== Group B ===
Pos	Team	Pld	W	D	L	GF	GA	GD	Pts	Qualification
1	Spain	3	3	0	0	10	0	+10	9	Knockout stage
2	Switzerland	3	2	0	1	8	7	+1	6	Knockout stage
3	Germany	3	1	0	2	5	6	−1	3	
4	Austria	3	0	0	3	1	11	−10	0	

Source: UEFA
Rules for classification: Group stage tiebreakers
19 July 2016
18:00

Spain	1–0	Germany
N. García 62'	Report

OMS ARENA Senica, Senica
Attendance: 591
Referee: Linn Andersson (Sweden)
19 July 2016
18:00

Austria	0–4	Switzerland
	Report	Zehnder 19', 88'; Mégroz 60'; Jenzer 77'

Stadium Myjava, Myjava
Attendance: 317
Referee: Lois Otte (Belgium)

22 July 2016
18:00

Spain	4–0	Austria
Falcón 5', 29'; L. García 69'; Bonmati 83' (pen.)	Report

Stadium Myjava, Myjava
Attendance: 483
Referee: Tania Fernandes Morais (Luxembourg)
22 July 2016
18:00

Germany	2–4	Switzerland
Sanders 3'; Freigang 70'	Report	Mégroz 6'; Surdez 64', 72'; Zehnder 90+1'

OMS ARENA Senica, Senica
Attendance: 503
Referee: Ivana Martinčić (Croatia)

25 July 2016
18:00

Switzerland	0–5	Spain
	Report	N. García 15', 47'; Hernández 36'; L. García 52', 74'

Stadium Myjava, Myjava
Attendance: 384
Referee: Ivana Projkovska (Macedonia)
25 July 2016
18:00

Germany	3–1	Austria
Ehegötz 43'; Freigang 58'; Sanders 73'	Report	Feric 84'

OMS ARENA Senica, Senica
Attendance: 576
Referee: Eszter Urbán (Hungary)

== Knockout stage ==
In the knockout stage, extra time and penalty shoot-out were used to decide the winner if necessary.

On 2 May 2016, the UEFA Executive Committee agreed that the competition would be part of the International Football Association Board's trial to allow a fourth substitute to be made during extra time.

=== Bracket ===
Semi-finals
28 July – Senec
France	3
Switzerland	1
28 July – Senec
Spain	4
Netherlands	3

Final
31 July – Senec
France	2
Spain	1

=== Semi-finals ===
28 July 2016
16:00

France	3–1	Switzerland
Matéo 46', 54'; Katoto 50'	Report	Reuteler 44'

NTC Senec, Senec
Attendance: 657
Referee: Lois Otte (Belgium)

28 July 2016
20:30

Spain	4–3	Netherlands
Hernández 25', 68', 81'; Cazalla 73'	Report	Admiraal 22'; Roord 59'; Hendriks 84'

NTC Senec, Senec
Attendance: 518
Referee: Linn Andersson (Sweden)

=== Final ===
The final was interrupted after the first half due to heavy rain and the resulting unfit terrain, and the second half began following a two-hour delay.

31 July 2016
19:00

France	2–1	Spain
Geyoro 36'; Katoto 66'	Report	L. García 84'

NTC Senec, Senec
Attendance: 1,024
Referee: Eszter Urbán (Hungary)

== Goalscorers ==
6 goals

- (France) Marie-Antoinette Katoto

5 goals

- (Netherlands) Jill Roord

4 goals

- (Spain) Lucía García
- (Spain) Sandra Hernández

3 goals

- (France) Clara Matéo
- (Spain) Nahikari García
- (Switzerland) Cinzia Zehnder

2 goals

- (France) Grace Geyoro
- (Germany) Laura Freigang
- (Germany) Stefanie Sanders
- (Netherlands) Sisca Folkertsma
- (Netherlands) Michelle Hendriks
- (Spain) Andrea Falcón
- (Switzerland) Naomi Mégroz
- (Switzerland) Camille Surdez

1 goal

- (Austria) Ivana Feric
- (France) Delphine Cascarino
- (France) Perle Morroni
- (Germany) Nina Ehegötz
- (Netherlands) Suzanne Admiraal
- (Norway) Katrine W. Jørgensen
- (Spain) Aitana Bonmati
- (Spain) Marta Cazalla
- (Switzerland) Lara Jenzer
- (Switzerland) Géraldine Reuteler

1 own goal

- (Slovakia) Stephanie Deszathová (playing against Netherlands)

Source: UEFA.com

== Team of the Tournament ==
Goalkeepers

- (France) Mylène Chavas
- (Netherlands) Paulina Quaye

Defenders

- (France) Théa Greboval
- (Netherlands) Vita van der Linden
- (Netherlands) Ashleigh Weerden
- (Spain) Beatriz Beltrán
- (Spain) Carmen Menayo

Midfielders

- (France) Grace Geyoro
- (France) Perle Morroni
- (Netherlands) Michelle Hendriks
- (Spain) Lucía García
- (Spain) Patricia Guijarro
- (Spain) Sandra Hernández
- (Spain) Andrea Falcón

Forwards

- (France) Marie-Antoinette Katoto
- (France) Clara Matéo
- (Netherlands) Jill Roord
- (Switzerland) Géraldine Reuteler

Source: UEFA Technical Report
