= Hayley Nolan =

Irish footballer

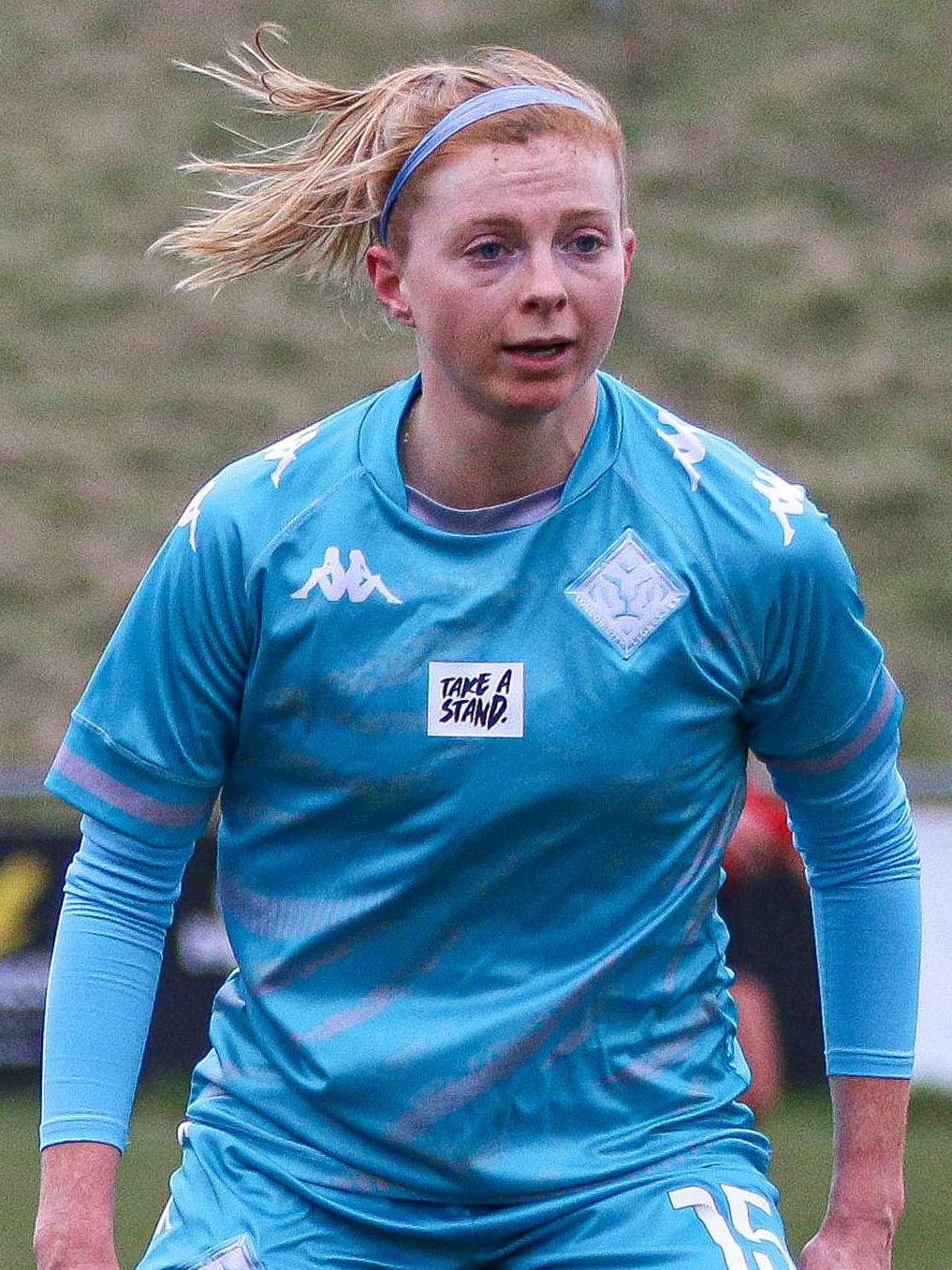
- Nolan in 2021

Personal information
- Full name: Hayley Rebecca Nolan
- Date of birth: 7 March 1997 (age 29)
- Place of birth: County Kildare, Ireland
- Height: 1.73 m (5 ft 8 in)
- Positions: Midfielder; defender

Team information
- Current team: Crystal Palace
- Number: 15

Youth career
- 2003–2009: Kill Celtic
- 2009–2015: Peamount United

College career
Years	Team	Apps	(Gls)
2015–2018	Hartford Hawks	70	(6)

Senior career*
Years	Team	Apps	(Gls)
2013–2015	Peamount United	16	(5)
2018–2019	Connecticut Fusion	6	(3)
2020–2023	London City Lionesses	51	(0)
2023–	Crystal Palace	47	(3)

International career^{‡}
2013–2014	Republic of Ireland U17	12	(0)
2014–2017	Republic of Ireland U19	13	(2)
2021–	Republic of Ireland	7	(0)
- * Club domestic league appearances and goals as of 3 May 2026 ‡ National team caps and goals as of 18 October 2026

Hayley Rebecca Nolan (born 7 March 1997) is an Irish professional footballer who plays as a midfielder for Crystal Palace in the Women's Super League and the Republic of Ireland national team.

== Early life ==
Nolan was raised in County Kildare, Ireland, and is the daughter of Caroline Kelly and John Nolan. Her father was the coach of Johnstown United and, after Nolan began to show potential, he encouraged her to sign for local boys club Kill Celtic at the age of six. She played with the boys' teams until under-12 level before signing for her first women's team, Peamount United. Nolan also grew up playing gaelic football, representing Kill GAA at U12, U14, U16 and minor.

Playing football as a schoolgirl, Nolan won honours at provincial and national level representing both Peamount United and her high school, St. Marys College Naas. In September 2013, she was named player of the match as Peamount beat Salthill Devon in the 2013 FAI Umbro Women's U16 Cup final.

In 2013, Nolan was promoted to Peamount United senior women's side in Women's National League. In 2015 she played all 120 minutes in a 3–2 WNL Cup final defeat to Raheny United after extra-time.

== College career ==
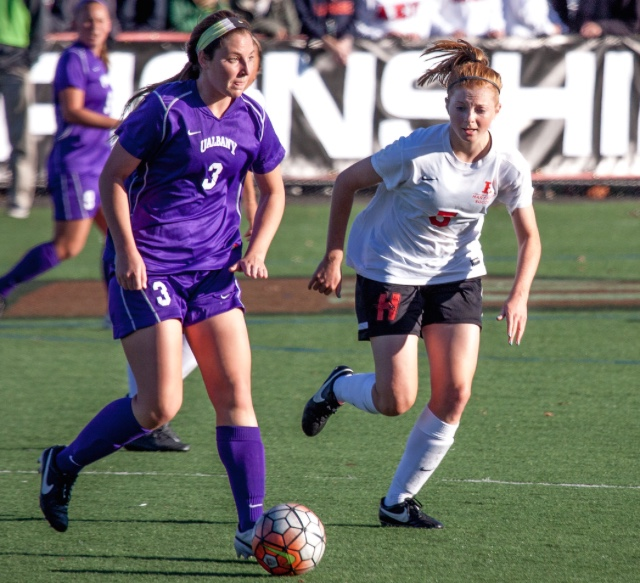
Nolan (white) in the 2015 America East Final.

Having originally planned at attend University College Dublin, Nolan was recruited by the University of Hartford and accepted a four-year scholarship to play college soccer and study economics and finance. She played four seasons for Hartford Hawks including two as team captain in 2017 and 2018. As a freshman Nolan was named to the America East All-Rookie Team and also received America East All-Championship Team honors, something she went on to replicate in all four seasons. Her first career goal was a game-winner against conference opponents Stony Brook on 1 October 2015.

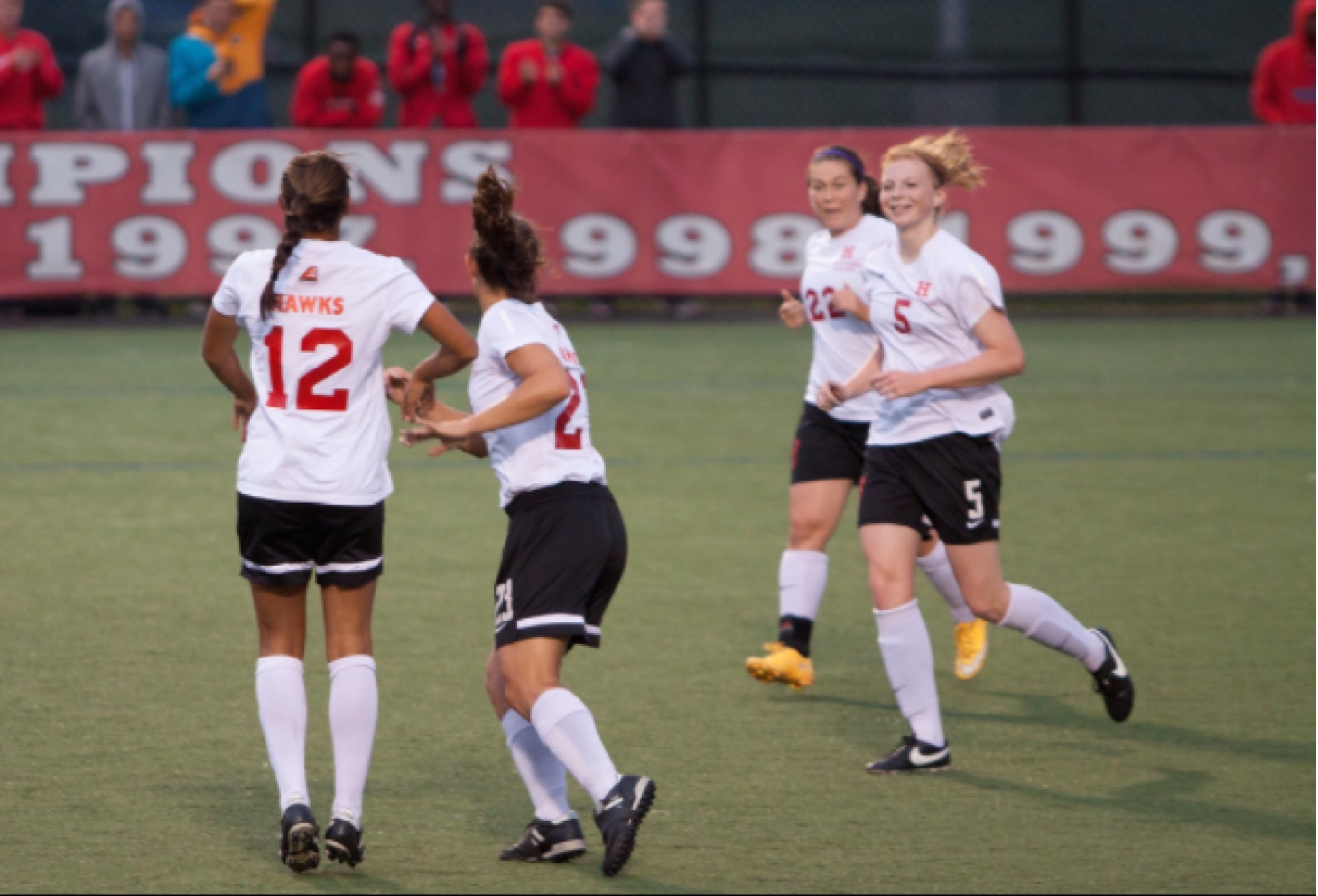
Nolan celebrating her first goal for the Hartford Hawks against Stony Brook in October 2015.

Nolan was named captain at the start of her junior year in 2017. She also changed position, moving from midfield to defense. She was named to the America East All-Conference First Team for the first time and, alongside teammate Sierra Stone, was also named to the Second Team All-East Region.

As a senior, Nolan scored a career-high three goals and helped the defense post a conference-best 0.92 goals-against average. She was named an America East All-Conference First Team selection for the second consecutive year, was an NEILA All-New England First Team selection and United Soccer Coaches All-East Region Second Team pick.

In total, Nolan finished her collegiate career with six goals and three assists, helping contribute to 24 shutouts in 70 appearances and 68 starts.

== Club career ==
On 18 March 2018, Nolan was one of the first six players signed to Connecticut Fusion ahead of their inaugural season in the second-tier UWS. She made six appearances, scoring three goals.

On 28 August 2020, Nolan signed for London City Lionesses of the English Championship. While with the club, Nolan was one of 31 footballers selected to take part in BT Sport series Ultimate Goal and compete for a chance to play in front of scouts in autumn 2020. in July 2023 Nolan left the club to join fellow Championship side Crystal Palace

== International career ==
=== Youth ===
Nolan has represented the Republic of Ireland at under-15, under-16, under-17, and under-19 level.

She was part of the Ireland team that reached the semi-finals at the 2014 UEFA Women's Under-19 Championship before eventually losing to Netherlands 4–0. Later that year she was nominated for the Under-19 Women's International Player of the Year at the FAI International Football Awards. In April 2016, Nolan scored in victories over Azerbaijan and Poland during the Elite Round of 2016 UEFA Women's Under-19 Championship qualification.

=== Senior ===
In October 2019, Nolan received her first call up to the senior team by newly appointed manager Vera Pauw for a UEFA Women's Euro 2021 qualifier against Ukraine. Nolan was involved as an unused substitute in six matchday squads throughout qualification. She made her debut on 11 April 2021 as a 74th-minute substitute for Megan Connolly in a 1–0 friendly defeat to Belgium.

== Career statistics ==
=== Club ===
As of match played 2 May 2026.

Appearances and goals by club, season and competition
Club	Season	League			National Cup		League Cup		Total	
Club	Season	Division	Apps	Goals	Apps	Goals	Apps	Goals	Apps	Goals
Connecticut Fusion	2018	UWS	6	3	—		0	0	6	3
London City Lionesses	2020–21	Championship	18	0	1	0	2	0	21	0
London City Lionesses	2021–22	Championship	11	0	1	0	0	0	12	0
London City Lionesses	2022–23	Championship	22	0	2	0	2	0	26	0
London City Lionesses	Total		51	0	4	0	4	0	59	0
Crystal Palace	2023–24	Championship	22	2	2	1	2	0	26	3
Crystal Palace	2024–25	WSL	10	0	0	0	1	0	11	0
Crystal Palace	2025–26	Championship	15	0	1	0	4	0	20	0
Career total			104	5	7	1	11	0	112	6

=== International ===
As of 13 October 2026

Appearances and goals by national team and year
National team	Year	Apps	Goals
Republic of Ireland	2021	1	0
Republic of Ireland	2022	1	0
Republic of Ireland	2023	1	0
Republic of Ireland	2025	2	0
Republic of Ireland	2026	2	0
Total		7	0
