= Pleun Raaijmakers =

Dutch footballer

Personal information
- Date of birth: 15 April 1997 (age 29)
- Place of birth: Oirschot, Netherlands
- Position: Midfielder

Team information
- Current team: ADO Den Haag
- Number: 6

Senior career*
| Years | Team | Apps | (Gls) |
| 2016–2019 | PSV | 33 | (3) |
| 2019– | ADO Den Haag | 63 | (1) |

International career^{‡}
| 2015-2016 | Netherlands U19 | 11 | (4) |
- * Club domestic league appearances and goals as of 13:59, 20 June 2024 (UTC) ‡ National team caps and goals as of 13:59, 20 June 2024 (UTC)

Pleun Raaijmakers (born 15 April 1997) is a Dutch footballer who plays as a midfielder for ADO Den Haag in the Eredivisie.

== Club career ==
=== PSV ===
On 10 June 2016, Raaijmakers was announced at PSV. She made her league debut against Ajax on 9 September 2016. Raaijmakers scored her first league goal against Achilles '29 on 17 February 2017, scoring in the 69th minute.

=== ADO Den Haag ===
On 3 June 2019, Raaijmakers was announced at ADO Den Haag. She made her league debut against PEC Zwolle on 23 August 2019. On 20 May 2021, Raaijmakers extended her contract for one season. On 26 May 2023, she signed a new one-year deal. Raaijmakers scored her first league goal against PEC Zwolle on 30 September 2023, scoring in the 12th minute. On 31 May 2024, she extended her contract for one season.

== International career ==
Raaijmakers scored on her Netherlands U19 debut on 15 September 2015, scoring a brace against Cyprus U19s in the 26th and 28th minute.

== Personal life ==
Raaijmakers is in a relationship with Gwyneth Hendriks, who plays for PSV.
