= Marilena Widmer =

Swiss footballer (born 1997)

Personal information
- Date of birth: 7 August 1997 (age 29)
- Position: Defender

Team information
- Current team: Grasshopper
- Number: 6

Senior career*
Years	Team	Apps	(Gls)
2018–2019	1. FFC Frankfurt		
2019–2021	BSC YB Frauen		
2021-	Grasshopper		

International career^{‡}
2017–	Switzerland	17	(1)
- * Club domestic league appearances and goals as of 19:21, 30 August 2019 (UTC) ‡ National team caps and goals as of 19:21, 30 August 2019 (UTC)

Marilena Widmer (born 7 August 1997) is a Swiss footballer who plays as a defender for Grasshopper Club Zürich and has appeared for the Switzerland national team.

== Career ==
Widmer has been capped for the Switzerland national team, appearing for the team during the 2019 FIFA Women's World Cup qualifying cycle.
