= Austria women's national under-19 football team =

Austrian Women's Football Team

Austria Women's U-19
- Association: Österreichischer Fußball-Bund (ÖFB)
- Confederation: UEFA (Europe)
- Head coach: Markus Hackl
- FIFA code: AUT
First colours	Second colours

First international
- Czech Republic 3–0 Austria; 22 June 2001

Biggest win
- Austria 12–0 Estonia; 25 October 2025

Biggest defeat
- Austria 0–7 Switzerland; 23 June 2002

UEFA Women's Under-19 Championship
- Appearances: 3 (first in 2016)
- Best result: Semi-Finals (2026)

FIFA U-20 Women's World Cup
- Appearances: 1 (first in 2024)
- Best result: Round of 16

Austria women's national under-19 football team is the football team representing Austria in competitions for under-19 year old players and is controlled by the Austrian Football Association. The team managed to qualify once for the UEFA Women's Under-19 Championship in 2016.

== Competitive record ==
=== FIFA U-20 Women's World Cup ===
FIFA U-20 Women's World Cup record
Year	Result	Pld	W	D	L	GF	GA
(Canada) 2002	Did not qualify						
(Thailand) 2004	Did not qualify						
(Russia) 2006	Did not qualify						
(Chile) 2008	Did not qualify						
(Germany) 2010	Did not qualify						
(Japan) 2012	Did not qualify						
(Canada) 2014	Did not qualify						
(Papua New Guinea) 2016	Did not qualify						
(France) 2018	Did not qualify						
(Costa Rica) 2022	Did not qualify						
(Colombia) 2024	Round of 16	4	2	0	2	7	9
(Poland) 2026	did not qualify						
Total	1/12	4	2	0	2	7	9

=== UEFA Women's Under-19 Championship ===
UEFA Women's Under-19 Championship record
Year	Result	Pld	W	D*	L	GF	GA
(Sweden) 2002	Did not qualify						
(Germany) 2003	Did not qualify						
(Finland) 2004	Did not qualify						
(Hungary) 2005	Did not qualify						
(Switzerland) 2006	Did not qualify						
(Iceland) 2007	Did not qualify						
(France) 2008	Did not qualify						
(Belarus) 2009	Did not qualify						
(North Macedonia) 2010	Did not qualify						
(Italy) 2011	Did not qualify						
(Turkey) 2012	Did not qualify						
(Wales) 2013	Did not qualify						
(Norway) 2014	Did not qualify						
(Israel) 2015	Did not qualify						
(Slovakia) 2016	Group stage	3	0	0	3	1	11
(Northern Ireland) 2017	Did not qualify						
(Switzerland) 2018	Did not qualify						
(Scotland) 2019	Did not qualify						
(Georgia (country)) ~~2020~~	Cancelled						
(Belarus) ~~2021~~	Cancelled						
(Czech Republic) 2022	Did not qualify						
(Belgium) 2023	Group stage	3	1	1	1	4	9
(Lithuania) 2024	Did not qualify						
(Poland) 2025	Did not qualify						
(Bosnia and Herzegovina) 2026	Semi-Finals	4	2	0	2	7	4
(Hungary) 2027	TBD						
Total	3/26	10	3	1	6	12	24

*Draws include knockout matches decided on penalty kicks.

== Results and fixtures ==
- The following is a list of match results in the last 12 months, as well as any future matches that have been scheduled.

Legend

Win Draw Lose Fixture

== Head-to-head record ==
The following table shows Austria's head-to-head record in the FIFA U-20 Women's World Cup.

Opponent	Pld	W	D	L	GF	GA	GD	Win %
Ghana	1	1	0	0	2	1	+1	100.00
Japan	1	0	0	1	0	2	−2	0.00
New Zealand	1	1	0	0	3	1	+2	100.00
North Korea	1	0	0	1	2	5	−3	0.00
Total	4	2	0	2	7	9	−2	50.00

== See also ==
- Austria women's national football team
- Austria women's national under-17 football team
- Women's association football around the world
- Austria men's national football team
