= Shkjipe Bojku =

Macedonian footballer

Personal information
- Date of birth: 21 September 1997 (age 29)
- Position: Forward

International career^{‡}
| Years | Team | Apps | (Gls) |
| 2012–2013 | North Macedonia U-17 | 5 | (0) |
| 2014–2015 | North Macedonia U-19 | 6 | (1) |
| 2015–2016 | North Macedonia | 5 | (0) |
- ‡ National team caps and goals as of 11:19, 21 September 2021 (UTC)

Shkjipe Bojku (born 21 September 1997) is a Macedonian footballer who plays as a forward for the North Macedonia national team.

== International career ==
Bojku made her debut for the North Macedonia national team on 27 October 2015, against Scotland.
