= Nathalie Persson =

Swedish footballer (born 1997)

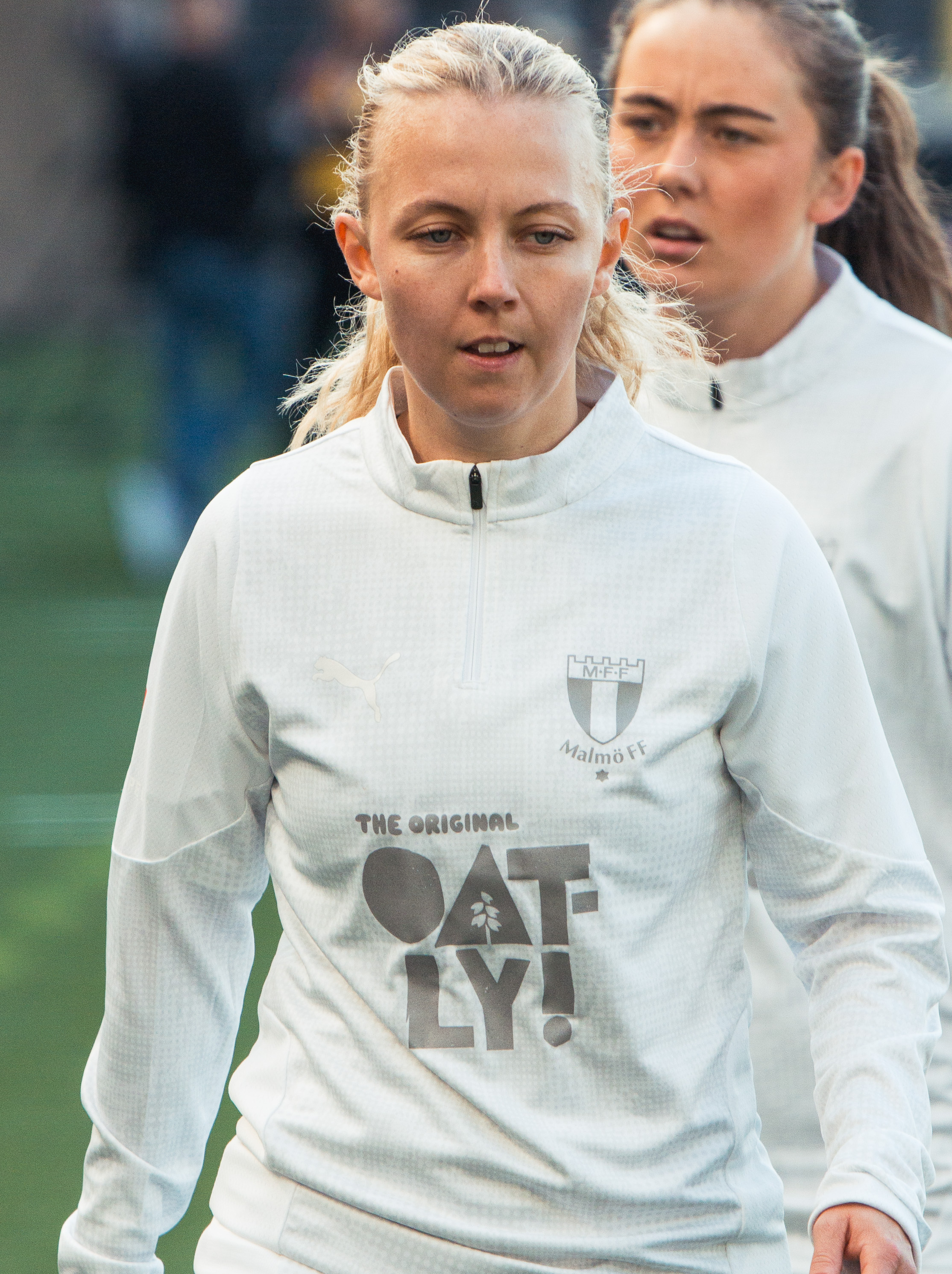
- Persson with Malmö FF in 2025

Personal information
- Full name: Anna Nathalie Hoff Persson
- Date of birth: 18 April 1997 (age 29)
- Place of birth: Sweden
- Position: Midfielder

Team information
- Current team: Malmö FF
- Number: 2

Youth career
- IF Limhamn Bunkeflo
- FC Rosengård

Senior career*
Years	Team	Apps	(Gls)
2014–2015	FC Rosengård	31	(3)
2016–2018	Kopparbergs/Göteborg FC	47	(1)
2018	Sporting CP		
2019	IF Limhamn Bunkeflo	21	(2)
2020–2023	KIF Örebro	86	(0)
2024–	Malmö FF	23	(2)

International career^{‡}
2013	Sweden U17	6	(1)
2014–2016	Sweden U19	9	(3)
- * Club domestic league appearances and goals as of 7 February 2025 ‡ National team caps and goals as of 15:29, 21 May 2016 (UTC)

Anna Nathalie Hoff Persson (born 18 April 1997) is a Swedish football midfielder who plays for Damallsvenskan club Malmö FF.

== Honours ==
Rosengård

- Damallsvenskan: 2013, 2014, 2015
- Svenska Supercupen: 2015
- Svenska Cupen runner-up: 2014–15

Sweden U19

- UEFA Women's Under-19 Championship: 2015
