= Viktoria Schwalm =

German footballer (born 1997)

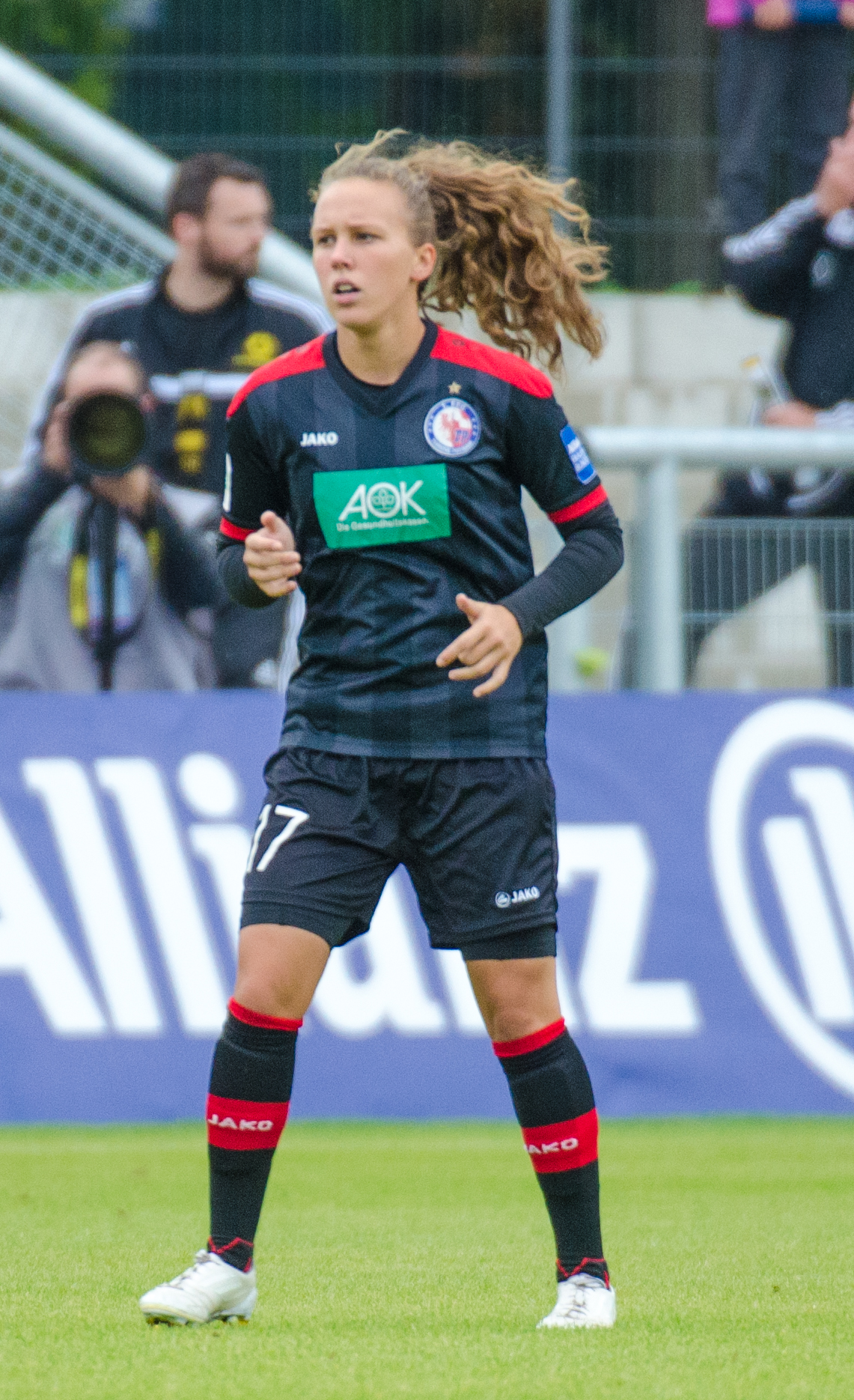

Personal information
- Full name: Viktoria Schwalm
- Date of birth: 9 December 1997 (age 28)
- Place of birth: Alsfeld, Germany
- Height: 1.65 m (5 ft 5 in)
- Position: Forward

Team information
- Current team: Hamburger SV
- Number: 23

Senior career*
Years	Team	Apps	(Gls)
2014–2023	Turbine Potsdam II	19	(12)
2015–2025	Turbine Potsdam	109	(29)
2025–	Hamburger SV	8	(0)
2025–	Hamburger SV II	2	(1)

International career^{‡}
2015–2016	Germany U19	7	(3)
- * Club domestic league appearances and goals as of 21 November 2026 ‡ National team caps and goals as of 10 April 2016

Viktoria Schwalm (born 9 December 1997) is a German professional footballer who plays as a forward for Hamburger SV in the German Bundesliga.
