= Nahikari García =

Spanish footballer

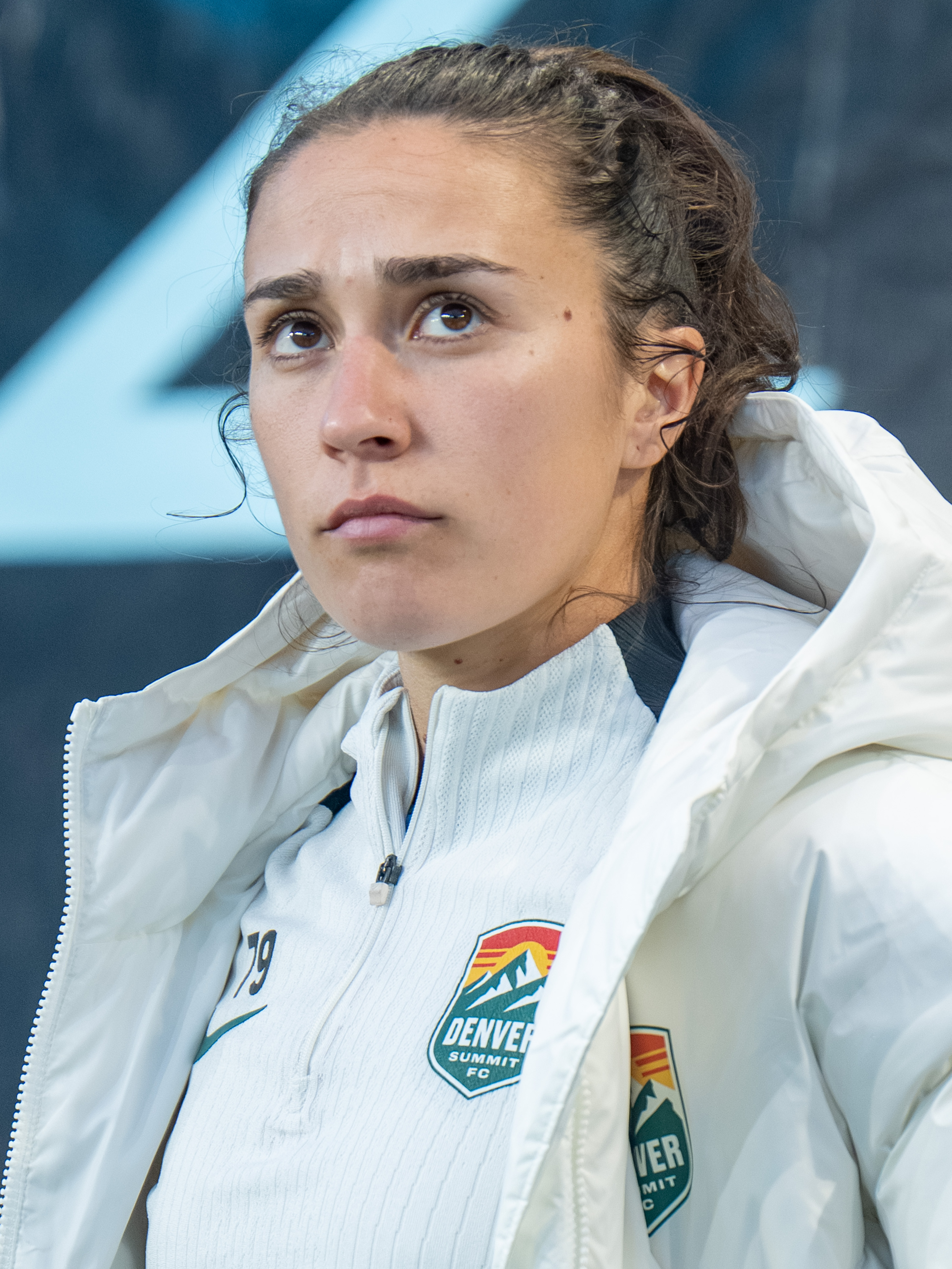
- García with the Denver Summit in 2026

Personal information
- Full name: Nahikari García Pérez
- Date of birth: 10 March 1997 (age 29)
- Place of birth: Urnieta, Spain
- Height: 1.59 m (5 ft 3 in)
- Position: Forward

Team information
- Current team: Denver Summit
- Number: 79

Youth career
- 2007–2012: Añorga

Senior career*
Years	Team	Apps	(Gls)
2012–2014	Añorga		
2014–2021	Real Sociedad	187	(99)
2021–2023	Real Madrid	45	(11)
2023–2025	Athletic Bilbao	57	(10)
2026–	Denver Summit	1	(0)
2025	→ Nottingham Forest (loan)	10	(2)

International career^{‡}
2012–2014	Spain U17	21	(16)
2014–2016	Spain U19	26	(19)
2015–2023	Basque Country	3	(1)
2016	Spain U20	4	(1)
2018–	Spain	18	(3)
- * Club domestic league appearances and goals as of 21 March 2026 ‡ National team caps and goals as of 21 November 2022

Nahikari García Pérez (born 10 March 1997) is a Spanish professional footballer who plays as a forward for Denver Summit FC of the National Women's Soccer League (NWSL) and the Spain national team.

García began her professional career with Añorga KKE before joining Real Sociedad in 2014. She went on to make over 200 appearances and holds the club's record for the most goals scored in a single season with her return of 16 goals in 2016. During her time with Real, she was nominated for the Primera División Forward of the Season award and helped the club win its first ever Copa de la Reina in 2019. She joined Real Madrid in 2021 after eight years at Real Sociedad. García returned to the Basque Country when she signed with Athletic Bilbao in 2023.

García also represented Spain at various youth levels, reaching three major tournament finals, and captained the U19 team before making her senior debut in 2018.

== Club career ==
=== Early career ===
García started playing football at the age of nine in San Sebastián when she joined a sports programme with her local side in Urnieta. The programme wasn't solely football based, however, which prompted to her to leave to sign for Añorga KKE where she spent seven years.

=== Real Sociedad ===
In the 2013–14 winter transfer market Real Sociedad completed the signing of García, who was only sixteen at the time, from Añorga. On 5 January, just days after signing for the club, she was handed her Primera División debut by manager Unai Gazpio against Levante. She ended that season with four goals to her name in nine matches, and the 2014–15 campaign with nine goals from 26 appearances.

In the following 2015–16 season García recorded a record-breaking tally of 16 goals, the most ever in a single season by a Real Sociedad player. Her haul included a notable goal against rivals Athletic Bilbao and a hat-trick against Levante during December which propelled the Txuri-urdin to a fifth-place finish in the Primera División, the club's highest placing since its formation in 2004. Real Sociedad also made the quarter-finals of the Copa de la Reina where they were eliminated 5–1 by eventual runners-up Barcelona, with García netting her side's only goal. Her form throughout the season saw her nominated for the Primera División Forward of the Season award.

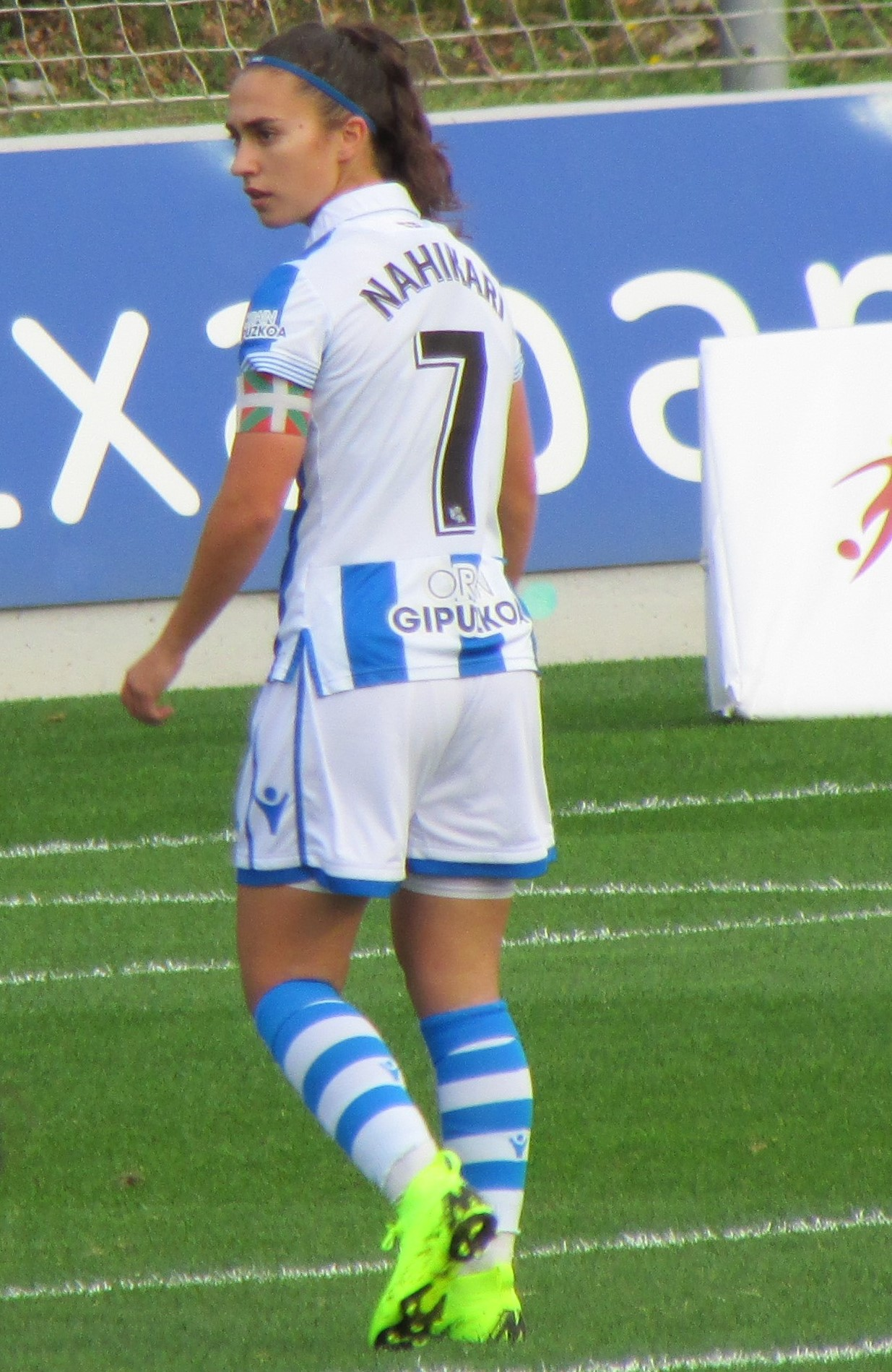
García represented Real Sociedad for eight years, from the age of 16.

Early in September 2016, García appeared alongside Charlyn Corral, Alexia Putellas, Iraia Iturregi and Amanda Sampedro in a video promoting the buildup to 2016–17. She scored her first hat-trick for the season on 9 December in a 4–0 league victory over Oiartzun and in April the following year signed a new two-year deal with the club. A goal from García on the final match-day of the campaign against Atlético Madrid was not enough to prevent the opposition from being crowned champions, as Real Sociedad went down 2–1.

Real Sociedad struggled during the first half of the following season and in November the club sacked manager Juanjo Arregi. García was quick to dismiss criticism of her former coach in an interview with Mundo Deportivo, stating that she was saddened by his departure and that the players should shoulder some of the blame. The following month, she scored five goals in a 6–1 win over Zaragoza and in the process helped the club move clear of the relegation zone. She ultimately scored 17 goals for the season as the team improved to end the campaign in seventh. Following the conclusion of the season, she was afforded the opportunity to sign for French side Paris Saint-Germain but elected to remain with Real Sociedad and continue her medical studies in Spain.

On 17 February 2019, García assisted teammate Kiana Palacios in Real Sociedad's 3–1 win over Sevilla and in doing so helped the club qualify for the final of the Copa de la Reina for the first time in its history. The final took place on 11 May where García scored the winning goal in a 2–1 victory over Atlético Madrid to guide the club to its first-ever Cup win.

=== Real Madrid ===
On 1 July 2021, García signed for Real Madrid.

=== Athletic Bilbao ===
After scoring 11 goals in two seasons for Real Madrid, García joined Athletic Bilbao on a free transfer through 2025. At the end of that contract she confirmed her departure, having scored 12 goals in 61 league and cup appearances.

=== Denver Summit FC ===
On 4 September 2025, it was announced that García had signed with Denver Summit of the National Women's Soccer League (NWSL). García was loaned to Nottingham Forest Women F.C., as Summit FC will not begin play until 2026.

== International career ==
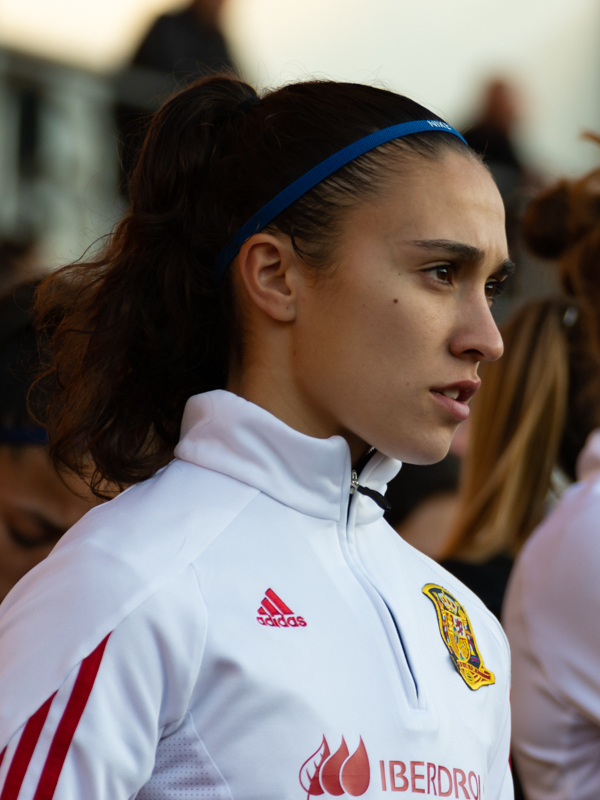
García with senior Spain squad in 2018

García has worn the number 7 jersey for both club and country during the course of her career. She credits former Real Madrid and Spain men's captain Raúl for her decision to wear the number, citing his style of play and on-field mentality as motivation in her own game.

=== Spain national youth teams ===
García's first exposure to the Spanish youth teams came when she was just fifteen-years old when she was called up to replace a player who was unable to travel with the U17 team.

In 2013 García, while representing Spain's U17 side, was awarded the Golden Boot award at the 2013 UEFA Women's Under-17 Championship, ending the tournament as the top goal scorer and only player to have scored more than once. Spain were ultimately eliminated by Sweden in the semi-finals but ended the tournament in third after beating Belgium in the third place playoff. She was again part of the squad for the 2014 edition of the tournament where Spain went one step further, this time ending as runners-up to Germany. It was the second time in the same year that Spain had ended a major competition as runners-up, having lost to Japan in the final of the FIFA U-17 Women's World Cup in April.

In July 2016 García, who was Real Sociedad's only representative in the squad, captained Spain to a silver medal at the UEFA Women's Under-19 Championship, losing 2–1 in the final to hosts France. She had two opportunities to draw Spain level but found herself the victim of a waterlogged pitch, missing a penalty in the opening half before 'skying' a near-open goal opportunity in injury-time as a result of the on-field conditions. The match was suspended for over two hours after half-time due to the weather conditions and upon the players' return to the pitch certain sections of the field were entirely waterlogged. García was ridiculed by large sections of the media for the miss but received overwhelming support from her fan-base, prompting her to take to Instagram following the tournament to thank those who stood behind her and the team. The showpiece match was her third appearance in a continental final, having previously ended as runner-up in the tournament's previous edition and as well as in the UEFA Women's Under-17 Championship in 2014. The record is one which she shares with teammates Andrea Sánchez Falcón and Naria Garrote.

Later that year, García was selected as one of the captains for the 2016 FIFA U-20 Women's World Cup to be held in Papua New Guinea. She made her debut on 13 November in Spain's opening match of the tournament, a 5–0 victory over Canada. García scored her first and only goal for the tournament on 24 November in a 3–2 loss to South Korea that saw Spain eliminated in the quarter-finals.

=== Spain senior national team ===
In August 2018, García was called up to the senior Spain squad for the first time by manager Jorge Vilda. She made her debut on 31 August and scored within eight minutes of coming on as a second-half substitute in a 5–1 win over Finland.

In 2019, García was called up for the 2019 World Cup.

== Sponsorships ==
García is currently sponsored by Spanish sportswear manufacturer Joma.

== Personal life ==
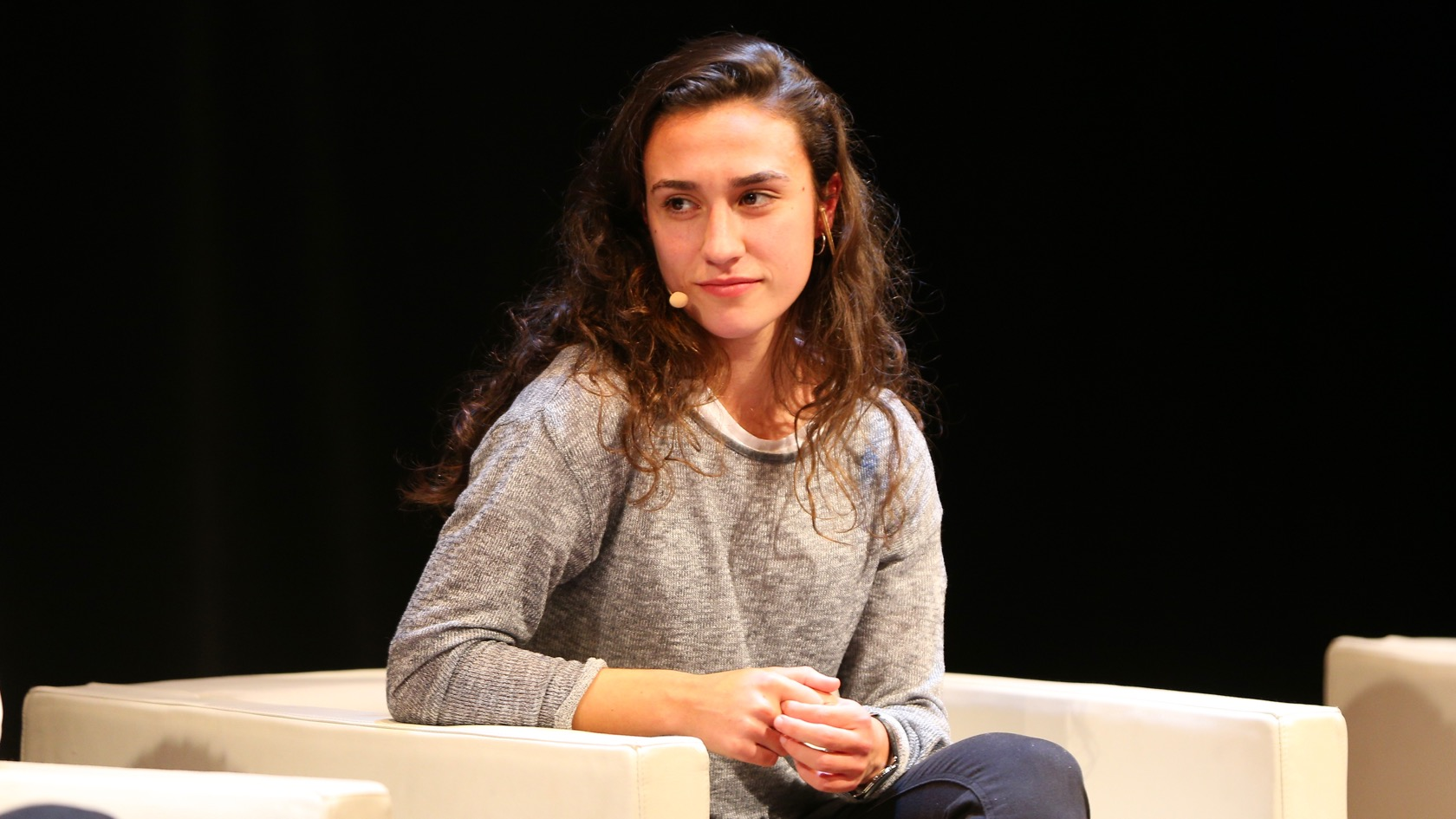
García during a discussion on women's football in 2019

García's first name, Nahikari, derives from her Basque origin and represents the values of nobility, loyalty and intelligence. Aside from football, she also studied towards a degree in medicine, completing her first course in 2016. In an interview with AS in the same year she explained that while it was "a little crazy" to combine her degree with football, she felt that football helped her with her studies and vice versa.

=== Superstition ===
García is fastidious when it comes to pre-match rituals. She plays with the same tape, wears two pairs of socks and always enters the field of play with her right foot first.

== Career statistics ==
=== Club ===
As of 10 January 2026

Appearances and goals by club, season and competition
Club	Season	League			National cup (Note: Includes Copa de la Reina de Fútbol, Women's FA Cup)		League cup (Note: Includes Women's League Cup)		Other (Note: Includes Supercopa de España)		Total	
Club	Season	Division	Apps	Goals	Apps	Goals	Apps	Goals	Apps	Goals	Apps	Goals
Real Sociedad	2013–14	Primera División	8	4	1	0	—		—		9	4
Real Sociedad	2014–15	Primera División	26	9	—		—		—		26	9
Real Sociedad	2015–16	Primera División	27	16	1	1	—		—		28	17
Real Sociedad	2016–17	Primera División	25	15	1	0	—		—		26	15
Real Sociedad	2017–18	Primera División	30	17	2	1	—		—		32	18
Real Sociedad	2018–19	Primera División	29	16	4	3	—		—		33	19
Real Sociedad	2019–20	Primera División	14	11	1	0	—		2	0	17	11
Real Sociedad	2020–21	Primera División	28	11	1	0	—		—		29	11
Real Sociedad	Total		187	99	11	5	0	0	2	0	200	104
Real Madrid	2021–22	Primera División	24	4	3	0	—		1	0	38	4
Real Madrid	2022–23	Liga F	21	7	3	1	—		1	0	25	8
Real Madrid	Total		45	11	6	1	0	0	2	0	53	12
Athletic Bilbao	2023–24	Liga F	27	5	4	2	—		—		31	7
Athletic Bilbao	2024–25	Liga F	30	5	0	0	—		—		30	5
Athletic Bilbao	Total		57	10	4	2	0	0	0	0	61	12
Nottingham Forest	2025–26	Women's Super League 2	10	2	1	0	3	0	—		14	2
Nottingham Forest	Total		10	2	1	0	3	0	0	0	14	2
Career total			299	122	22	8	3	0	4	0	328	130

=== International ===
As of match played 31 August 2019

National team	Season	Friendly		Competitive		Total		
National team	Season	Apps	Goals	Apps	Goals	Apps	Goals	Ratio
Spain	2018–19	8	0	5	1	13	1	0.07
Spain	2019–20	1	0	0	0	1	0	0

Scores and results list Spain's goal tally first, score column indicates score after each García goal.

List of international goals scored by Nahikari García
No.	Date	Venue	Opponent	Score	Result	Competition
1	31 August 2018	El Sardinero, Santander, Spain	Finland	15–1	5–1	2019 FIFA Women's World Cup qualification
2	13 April 2021	Estadio Municipal de Marbella, Marbella, Spain	Mexico	12–0	3–0	Friendly
3	13 April 2021	Estadio Municipal de Marbella, Marbella, Spain	Mexico	13–0	3–0	Friendly

== Honours ==
Real Sociedad

- Copa de la Reina: 2018–19

Spain U17

- UEFA Women's Under-17 Championship runner-up: 2013, 2014
- FIFA U-17 Women's World Cup runner-up: 2014

Spain U19

- UEFA Women's Under-19 Championship runner-up: 2015, 2016

Individual

- UEFA Women's Under-17 Championship: Golden Boot 2013
