= Viktoriya Kazakevich =

Belarusian footballer

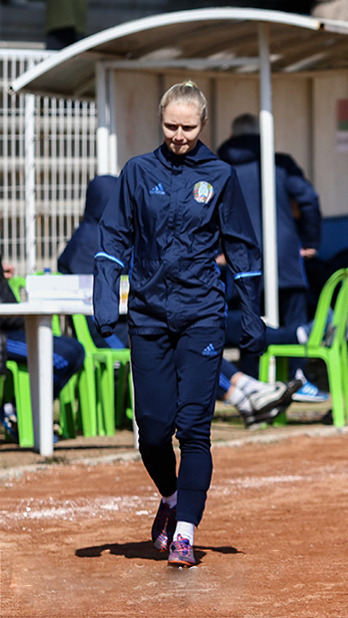

Personal information
- Date of birth: 12 May 1998 (age 28)
- Place of birth: Minsk, Belarus
- Height: 1.71 m (5 ft 7 in)
- Position: Defender

Team information
- Current team: FC Minsk
- Number: 20

Senior career*
Years	Team	Apps	(Gls)
2014–2018	Zorka-BDU	62	(35)
2019	Isloch-RGUOR	20	(5)
2020–2021	Dinamo-BGU	43	(9)
2022-2023	FC Minsk	36	(11)
2023–2024	Saint-Étienne		
2024–	FC Minsk		

International career^{‡}
2016-	Belarus	13	(0)
- * Club domestic league appearances and goals as of 23:50, 31 December 2024 (UTC) ‡ National team caps and goals as of 00:55, 4 May 2020 (UTC)

Viktoriya Kazakevich (born 12 May 1998) is a Belarusian footballer who plays as a defender for Belarusian Premier League club FC Minsk and the Belarus women's national team.

== Career ==
Kazakevich has been capped for the Belarus national team, appearing for the team during the 2019 FIFA Women's World Cup qualifying cycle.
