= Lesley Ramseier =

Swiss association football player

Personal information
- Date of birth: 5 June 1997 (age 29)
- Position: Midfielder

Lesley Ramseier (born 5 June 1997) is a Swiss footballer who plays for the Swiss side FC Zurich.
