= Stefanie Sanders =

German footballer (born 1998)

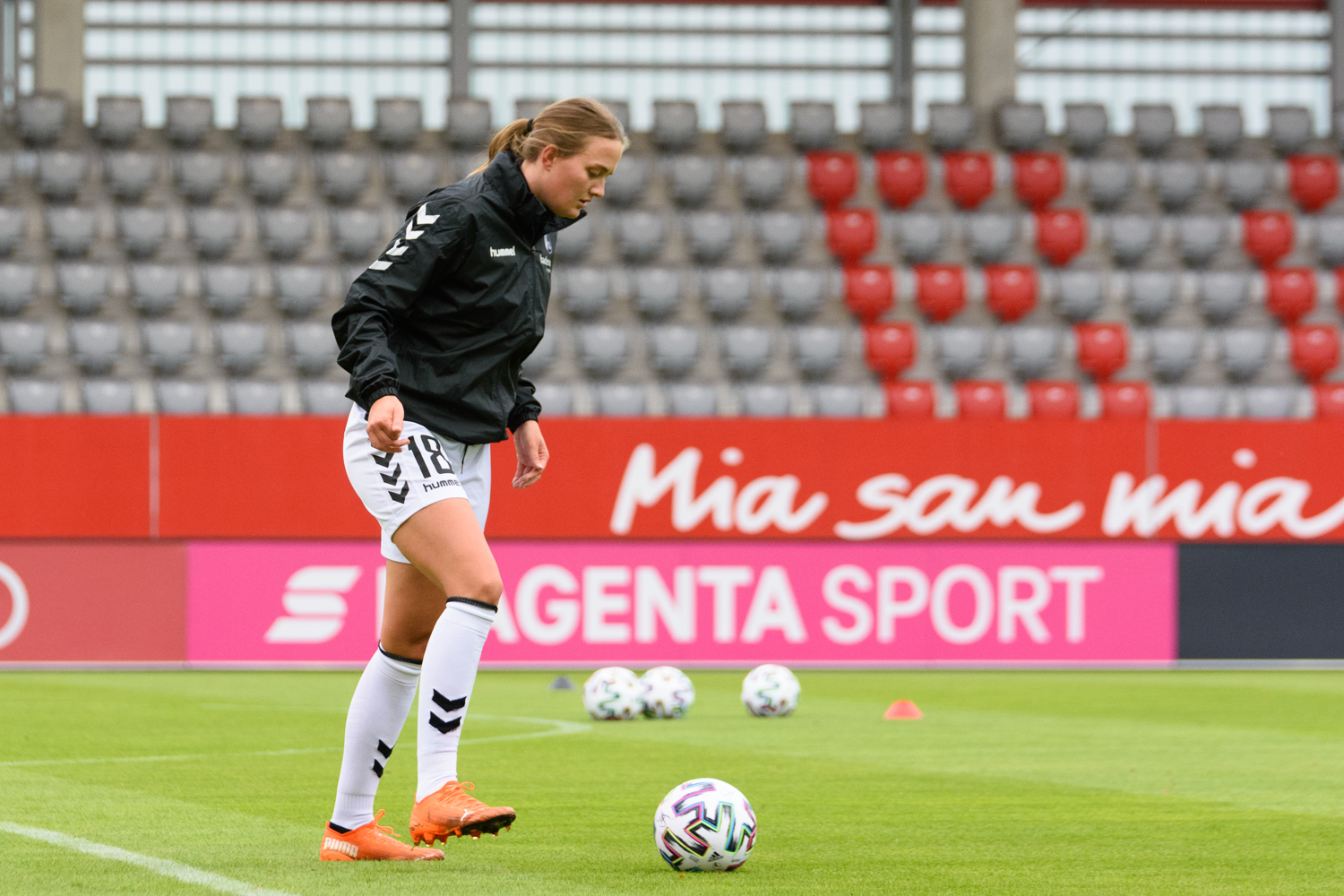
- Sanders warming up in 2020

Personal information
- Full name: Stefanie Antonia Sanders
- Date of birth: 12 June 1998 (age 28)
- Place of birth: Hamburg, Germany
- Height: 1.78 m (5 ft 10 in)
- Position: Forward

Youth career
- 2013–2015: Werder Bremen

College career
Years	Team	Apps	(Gls)
2017–2018	UCF Knights		

Senior career*
Years	Team	Apps	(Gls)
2015–2017	Werder Bremen	35	(19)
2019–2021	SC Freiburg	34	(8)
2019–2021	SC Freiburg II		
2021–2023	FC Rosengård	38	(11)
2023	Werder Bremen	10	(0)
2023–2024	OH Leuven		
2024–2025	Odense Boldklub Q	0	(0)

International career
2012–2013	Germany U15	5	(7)
2013–2014	Germany U16	7	(7)
2014–2015	Germany U17	14	(14)
2015–2017	Germany U19	9	(7)
2016–2018	Germany U20	16	(5)
- * Club domestic league appearances and goals as of 7 September 2023

Stefanie Antonia Sanders (born 12 June 1998) is a German footballer who plays as a forward. She previously played for Werder Bremen, UCF Knights, SC Freiburg, FC Rosengård, and OH Leuven. She is a former Germany youth international.

== Club career ==
A youth product of the club, Sanders made her senior debut with Werder Bremen.

In January 2019, she joined Frauen-Bundesliga club SC Freiburg from UCF Knights.

She moved to Damallsvenskan side FC Rosengård in January 2021.

In January 2023, Sanders returned to former club Werder Bremen from FC Rosengård.

She moved to Belgian Women's Super League side OH Leuven in September 2023, having agreed a one-year contract.

== International career ==
Sanders has represented Germany at internationally at youth levels U15 through U20. She played at the 2016 FIFA U-20 Women's World Cup in Papua New Guinea, helping the Germany U20 reach the quarterfinals and scoring three goals in the group stage.
