= Naomi Mégroz =

Swiss footballer (born 1998)

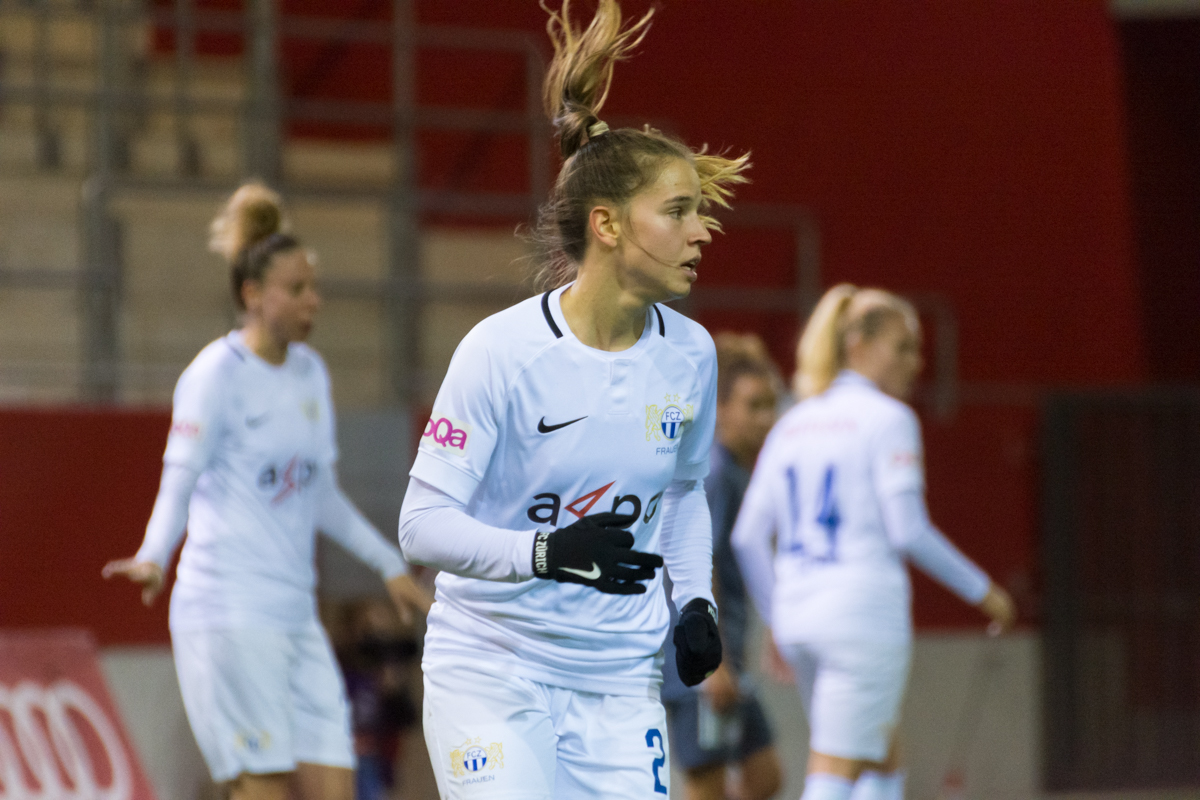
- Mégroz in 2018

Personal information
- Date of birth: 6 August 1998 (age 28)
- Place of birth: Zürich, Switzerland
- Height: 1.68 m (5 ft 6 in)
- Position: Defender

Team information
- Current team: Zürich
- Number: 2

Senior career*
Years	Team	Apps	(Gls)
2016–2019	Zürich		
2019–2021	SC Freiburg	26	(4)
2021–	Zürich	35	(5)

International career^{‡}
2017–	Switzerland	13	(1)
- * Club domestic league appearances and goals as of 16 March 2024 ‡ National team caps and goals as of 19:50, 30 August 2019 (UTC)

Naomi Mégroz (born 6 August 1998) is a Swiss footballer who plays as a defender for FC Zürich and has appeared for the Switzerland national team.

== Career ==
Mégroz has been capped for the Switzerland national team, appearing for the team during the 2019 FIFA World Cup qualifying cycle.
