= Sisca Folkertsma =

Dutch footballer

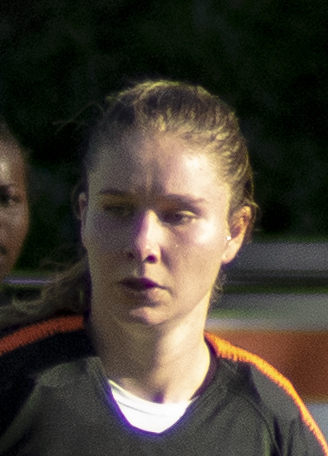
- Folkertsma in 2018

Personal information
- Full name: Sippie Catharine Folkertsma
- Date of birth: 21 May 1997 (age 29)
- Place of birth: Sloten, Netherlands
- Height: 1.71 m (5 ft 7 in)
- Position: Forward

Team information
- Current team: PSV
- Number: 6

Senior career*
Years	Team	Apps	(Gls)
2012–2015	SC Heerenveen	60	(14)
2015–2017	PSV	48	(10)
2017–2018	Ajax	13	(1)
2018–2021	Twente	39	(3)
2021–2023	Bordeaux	15	(1)
2023–2024	Feyenoord	15	(0)
2024–	PSV	6	(1)

International career^{‡}
2012	Netherlands U15	3	(1)
2013	Netherlands U16	6	(2)
2013	Netherlands U17	7	(3)
2014–2016	Netherlands U19	22	(17)
2016–	Netherlands	16	(0)
Medal record
Women's football
Representing the Netherlands
UEFA Women's Championship
Winner	2017 Netherlands
UEFA Women's Under-19 Championship
Winner	2014 Norway
- * Club domestic league appearances and goals as of 18:05, 10 November 2024 ‡ National team caps and goals as of 26 October 2021

Sippie Catharine "Sisca" Folkertsma (Dutch pronunciation: [ˈsɪskaː ˈfɔlkərtsmaː]; born 21 May 1997) is a Dutch footballer who plays as a forward for Dutch Vrouwen Eredivisie club PSV and the Netherlands national team.

== Career ==
=== SC Heerenveen ===
Folkertsma made her league debut against Utrecht on 30 November 2012. She scored her first league goal against VV Alkmaar on 22 March 2013, scoring in the 90th+3rd minute.

=== PSV ===
Folkertsma made her league debut against PEC Zwolle on 21 August 2015. She scored her first league goal against ADO Den Haag on 28 August 2015, scoring in the 11th minute. Folkerstma scored a hattrick against Alkmaar on 16 October 2015.

=== Ajax ===
On 16 June 2017, Folkertsma was announced at Ajax. She made her league debut against Achilles '29 on 3 September 2017. Folkertsma scored her first league goal against ADO Den Haag on 15 December 2017, scoring in the 20th minute.

=== Twente ===
Folkertsma made her league debut against PSV on 7 September 2018. She scored her first league goal against PEC Zwolle on 14 September 2018, scoring in the 36th minute. On 16 April 2019, it was announced that her contract had been extended.

=== Bordeaux ===
In June 2021, while she was preparing for the 2020 Olympics it was revealed Folkertsma had agreed contract terms with French club Bordeaux. She made her league debut against Saint-Étienne on 28 August 2021. Folkertsma scored her first league goal against Soyaux on 4 September 2021, scoring in the 2nd minute.

=== Feyenoord ===
In May 2023, Dutch club Feyenoord announced that it had reached a deal with Folkertsma for her to join the club from the start of the upcoming season. She made her league debut against Twente on 1 October 2023. She will share captain duties with Jacintha Weimar and Esmee de Graaf from the 2024–25 season.

== International career ==
Folkertsma score a hattrick against Cyprus U19s on 15 September 2015. She also scored a hattrick against Czech Republic U19s on 5 April 2016.

She was a member of the team that became champions at the UEFA Women's Euro 2017. After the tournament, the whole team was honoured by the Prime Minister Mark Rutte and Minister of Sport Edith Schippers and made Knights of the Order of Orange-Nassau.

On 28 March 2023, Folkertsma was called up to the national team.

== Career statistics ==
=== International ===
As of match played 26 October 2021

Appearances and goals by national team and year
National team	Year	Apps	Goals
Netherlands	2016	1	0
Netherlands	2017	6	0
Netherlands	2018	0	0
Netherlands	2019	1	0
Netherlands	2020	1	0
Netherlands	2021	7	0
Total		16	0

== Honours ==
Netherlands

- UEFA Women's Championship: 2017

Individual

- Knight of the Order of Orange-Nassau: 2017
