= Nina Ehegötz =

German footballer (born 1997)

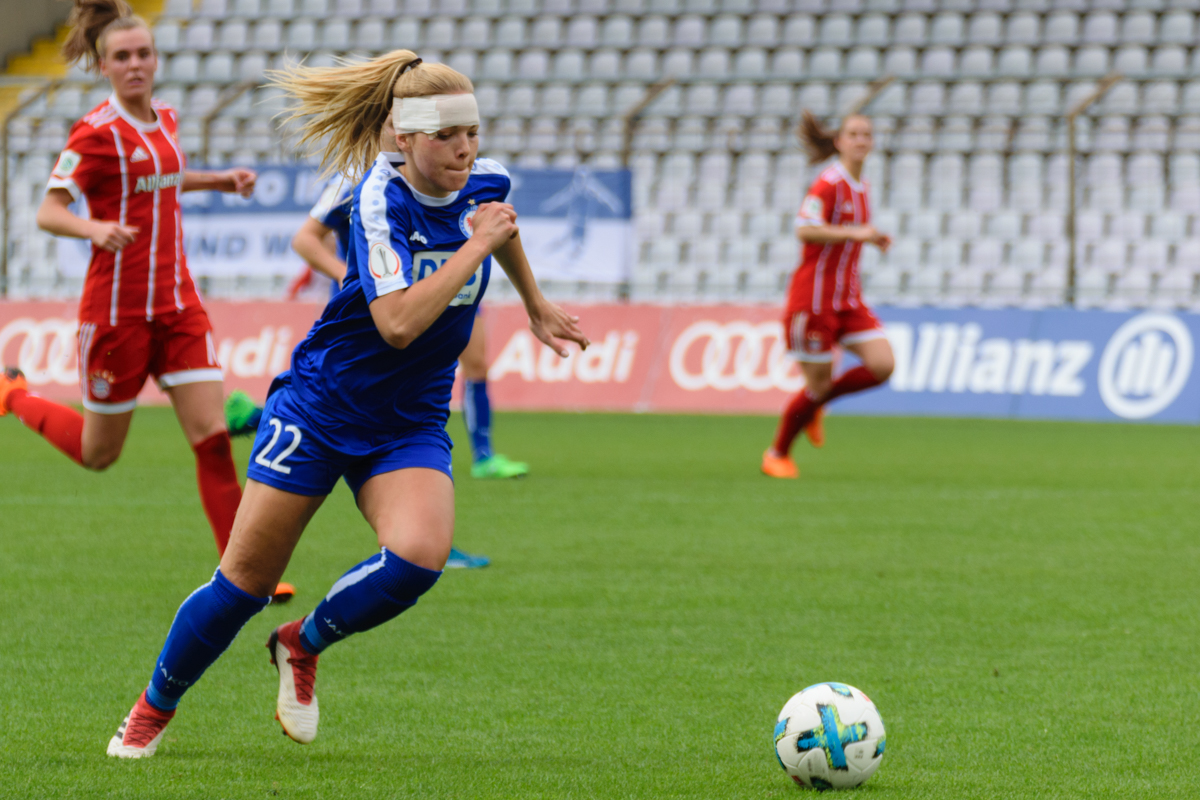
- Ehegötz in 2018

Personal information
- Date of birth: 22 February 1997 (age 29)
- Place of birth: Dortmund, Germany
- Height: 1.72 m (5 ft 8 in)
- Position: Defender

Team information
- Current team: Viktoria Berlin
- Number: 29

Senior career*
Years	Team	Apps	(Gls)
2013–2015	FSV Gütersloh 2009	29	(12)
2015–2016	1. FC Köln	21	(0)
2016–2017	Bayer 04 Leverkusen	5	(0)
2017–2022	1. FFC Turbine Potsdam	76	(16)
2022–	Viktoria Berlin	77	(33)

International career
2012	Germany U15	1	(1)
2012–2013	Germany U16	6	(5)
2012–2014	Germany U17	18	(4)
2014–2016	Germany U19	18	(7)
2015–2016	Germany U20	4	(1)
- * Club domestic league appearances and goals as of 22 November 2026

Nina Ehegötz (born 22 February 1997) is a German footballer who played as a midfielder for Viktoria Berlin.

== International career ==
Ehegötz has represented Germany at youth level.
