= Cinzia Zehnder =

Swiss footballer (born 1997)

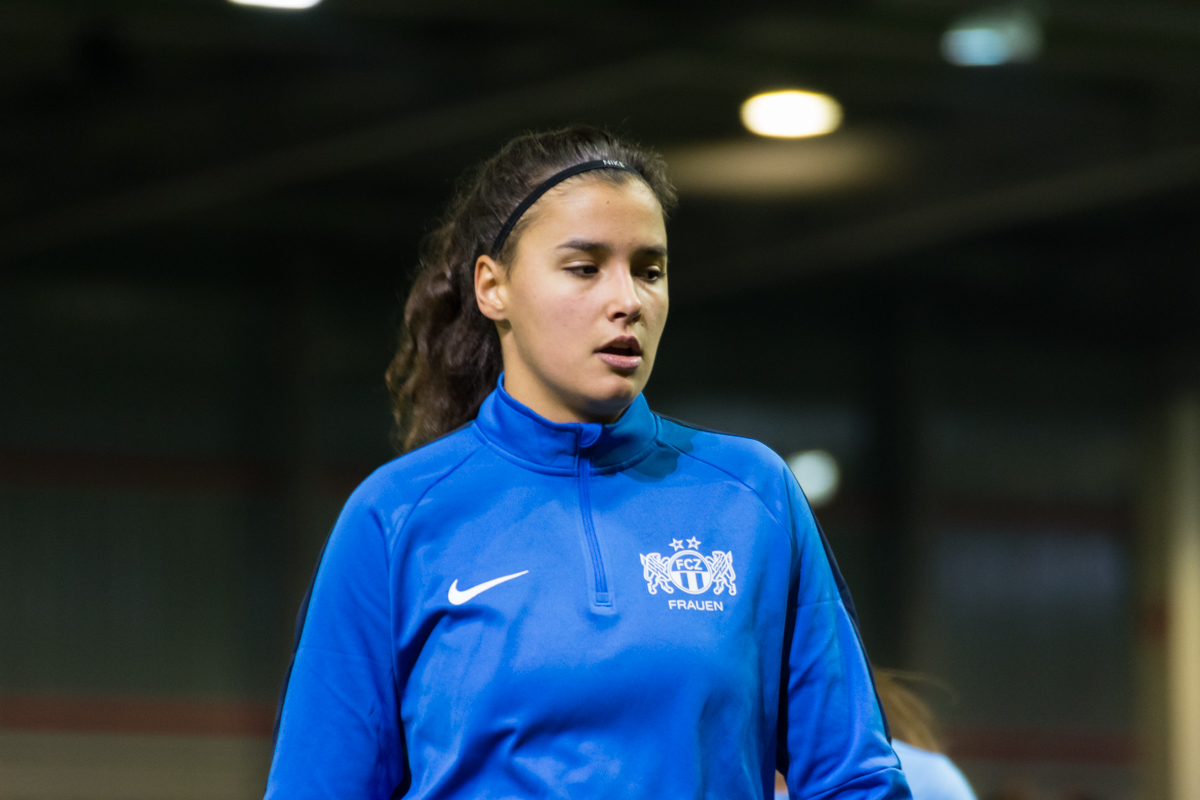

Personal information
- Full name: Cinzia Vittoria Zehnder
- Date of birth: 4 August 1997 (age 29)
- Place of birth: Zurich, Switzerland
- Height: 1.83 m (6 ft 0 in)
- Position: Midfielder

Team information
- Current team: SV Höngg

Youth career
- 2005–2011: FC Wil

Senior career*
Years	Team	Apps	(Gls)
2011–2012	FC Kirchberg		
2012–2015	FC Zürich	67	(27)
2015–2017	Freiburg	42	(3)
2017–2020	FC Zürich	60	(4)
2020–2021	FC Bayern Munich II	16	(2)
2023–2025	FC Oerlikon/Polizei ZH	13	(4)
2025–	SV Höngg		

International career^{‡}
2014–2020	Switzerland	27	(0)
- * Club domestic league appearances and goals as of 10:15, 5 July 2022 (UTC) ‡ National team caps and goals as of 4 September 2018

Cinzia Vittoria Zehnder (born 4 August 1997) is a Swiss professional footballer who plays as a midfielder for SV Höngg. Since her debut in June 2014, a 7–0 win over Serbia, she has been a member of the Switzerland national team.

Zehnder came to the attention of FC Zürich after playing against them in a friendly for FC Kirchberg. She signed for FC Zürich as a youth prospect but quickly made her first-team debut on her 15th birthday, registering an assist. Playing alongside Zürich's veteran German duo Inka Grings and Sonja Fuss aided Zehnder's development. National coach Martina Voss-Tecklenburg called her up to the national team and in summer 2015 was reportedly helping her to secure a transfer to the professional German Bundesliga for a higher standard of club football. In May 2015, Zehnder joined SC Freiburg. In June 2017 she returned to Zurich as she continued her studies in medicine.
