= 2015 UEFA Women's Under-19 Championship qualification =

Tournament details
- Dates: 13–18 September 2014 (qualifying round); 4–9 April 2015 (elite round)
- Teams: 47 (from 1 confederation)

Tournament statistics
- Matches played: 102
- Goals scored: 454 (4.45 per match)
- Top scorer: (Sweden) Stina Blackstenius (14 goals)

The 2015 UEFA Women's Under-19 Championship qualifying competition was a women's under-19 football competition played in 2014 and 2015 to determine the seven teams joining Israel, who qualified automatically as hosts, in the 2015 UEFA Women's Under-19 Championship final tournament. A total of 47 UEFA member national teams entered the qualifying competition.

The final tournament also acted as the UEFA qualifier for the 2016 FIFA U-20 Women's World Cup in Papua New Guinea, with the four semi-finalists qualifying.

== Format ==
The qualifying competition consisted of two rounds:

- Qualifying round: Apart from Germany, England and France, which received byes to the elite round as the three teams with the highest seeding coefficient, the remaining 44 teams were drawn into 11 groups of four teams. Each group was played in single round-robin format at one of the teams selected as hosts after the draw. The 11 group winners and the 10 runners-up with the best record against the first and third-placed teams in their group advanced to the elite round.
- Elite round: The 24 teams were drawn into six groups of four teams. Each group was played in single round-robin format at one of the teams selected as hosts after the draw. The six group winners and the runner-up with the best record against the first and third-placed teams in their group qualified for the final tournament.

=== Tiebreakers ===
If two or more teams were equal on points on completion of a mini-tournament, the following tie-breaking criteria were applied, in the order given, to determine the rankings:

1. Higher number of points obtained in the mini-tournament matches played among the teams in question;
2. Superior goal difference resulting from the mini-tournament matches played among the teams in question;
3. Higher number of goals scored in the mini-tournament matches played among the teams in question;
4. If, after having applied criteria 1 to 3, teams still had an equal ranking, criteria 1 to 3 were reapplied exclusively to the mini-tournament matches between the teams in question to determine their final rankings. If this procedure did not lead to a decision, criteria 5 to 9 applied;
5. Superior goal difference in all mini-tournament matches;
6. Higher number of goals scored in all mini-tournament matches;
7. If only two teams had the same number of points, and they were tied according to criteria 1 to 6 after having met in the last round of the mini-tournament, their rankings were determined by a penalty shoot-out (not used if more than two teams had the same number of points, or if their rankings were not relevant for qualification for the next stage).
8. Lower disciplinary points total based only on yellow and red cards received in the mini-tournament matches (red card = 3 points, yellow card = 1 point, expulsion for two yellow cards in one match = 3 points);
9. Drawing of lots.

To determine the ten best runners-up from the qualifying round and the best runner-up from the elite round, the results against the teams in fourth place were discarded. The following criteria were applied:

1. Higher number of points;
2. Superior goal difference;
3. Higher number of goals scored;
4. Lower disciplinary points total based only on yellow and red cards received (red card = 3 points, yellow card = 1 point, expulsion for two yellow cards in one match = 3 points);
5. Drawing of lots.

== Qualifying round ==
=== Draw ===
The draw for the qualifying round was held at UEFA headquarters in Nyon, Switzerland on 20 November 2013 at 10:45 CET (UTC+1).

The teams were seeded according to their coefficient ranking, calculated based on the following:

- 2011 UEFA Women's Under-19 Championship final tournament and qualifying competition (qualifying round and elite round)
- 2012 UEFA Women's Under-19 Championship final tournament and qualifying competition (qualifying round and elite round)
- 2013 UEFA Women's Under-19 Championship final tournament and qualifying competition (qualifying round and elite round)

Each group contained one team from Pot A, one team from Pot B, one team from Pot C, and one team from Pot D.

Bye to elite round
Team	Coeff	Rank
Germany	13.667	1
England	12.667	2
France	12.000	3

Pot A
Team	Coeff	Rank
Norway	10.500	4
Denmark	10.333	5
Sweden	10.167	6
Spain	10.000	7
Italy	8.667	8
Finland	8.500	9
Switzerland	8.333	10
Belgium	8.233	11
Portugal	7.000	12
Czech Republic	7.000	13
Netherlands	7.000	14

Pot C
Team	Coeff	Rank
Poland	4.167	26
Greece	4.000	27
Turkey	3.833	28
Croatia	3.500	29
Slovenia	3.333	30
Bosnia and Herzegovina	2.000	31
Macedonia	2.000	32
Cyprus	1.333	33
Slovakia	1.333	34
Moldova	1.333	35
Faroe Islands	1.333	36

Pot B
Team	Coeff	Rank
Iceland	6.833	15
Scotland	6.667	16
Austria	6.500	17
Serbia	6.333	18
Russia	6.000	19
Republic of Ireland	6.000	20
Wales	5.167	21
Romania	5.167	22
Northern Ireland	4.833	23
Ukraine	4.333	24
Hungary	4.333	25

Pot D
Team	Coeff	Rank
Lithuania	1.200	37
Bulgaria	1.000	38
Belarus	0.333	39
Estonia	0.333	40
Kazakhstan	0.000	41
Latvia	0.000	42
Azerbaijan	0.000	43
Georgia	0.000	44
Albania	—	45
Malta	—	46
Montenegro	—	47

Notes

- Israel (Coeff: 1.000) qualified automatically for the final tournament as hosts.
- Andorra, Armenia, Gibraltar, Liechtenstein, Luxembourg, and San Marino did not enter.

=== Groups ===
All times were CEST (UTC+2).

==== Group 1 ====
Pos	Team	Pld	W	D	L	GF	GA	GD	Pts	Qualification
1	Spain	3	3	0	0	23	1	+22	9	Elite round
2	Iceland	3	2	0	1	10	2	+8	6	Elite round
3	Croatia	3	1	0	2	3	10	−7	3	
4	Lithuania (H)	3	0	0	3	2	25	−23	0	

Source: UEFA
Rules for classification: Qualification tiebreakers
(H) Hosts
13 September 2014
15:00

Spain	7–0	Croatia
Falcón 12', 27', 37'; Caldentey 16', 41'; García 43'; García Boa 44'	Report

Marijampolé Football Club Stadium, Marijampolė
Referee: Eszter Urban (Hungary)
13 September 2014
15:00

Iceland	8–0	Lithuania
I. Sigurðardóttir 7'; E. Arnarsdóttir 12'; G. Sigurðardóttir 23', 54', 69'; Hlynsdóttir 67'; Hauksdóttir 84'; S. Sigurðardóttir 87'	Report

Darius and Girėnas Stadium, Kaunas
Referee: Julia-Stefanie Baier (Austria)

15 September 2014
15:00

Spain	14–0	Lithuania
Garrote 3', 36', 67', 75'; Falcón 7', 66', 82'; García Boa 18'; Caldentey 24', 26', 60'; Baños 33'; García 38', 58'	Report

Darius and Girėnas Stadium, Kaunas
Referee: Eliska Kramlova (Czech Republic)
15 September 2014
15:00

Croatia	0–1	Iceland
	Report	I. Sigurðardóttir 5'

Marijampolé Football Club Stadium, Marijampolė
Referee: Julia-Stefanie Baier (Austria)

18 September 2014
15:00

Iceland	1–2	Spain
H. Arnarsdóttir 78'	Report	García 17'; Caldentey 90+1'

Marijampolé Football Club Stadium, Marijampolė
Referee: Eszter Urban (Hungary)
18 September 2014
15:00

Lithuania	2–3	Croatia
Veličkaitė 2'; Ruzgutė 90+3'	Report	Šćukanec-Hopinski 28'; Maltašić 31'; Dokuzović 45+1'

Darius and Girėnas Stadium, Kaunas
Referee: Eliska Kramlova (Czech Republic)

==== Group 2 ====
Pos	Team	Pld	W	D	L	GF	GA	GD	Pts	Qualification
1	Denmark	3	3	0	0	10	1	+9	9	Elite round
2	Ukraine	3	2	0	1	5	5	0	6	Elite round
3	Azerbaijan (H)	3	0	1	2	0	4	−4	1	
4	Cyprus	3	0	1	2	1	6	−5	1	

Source: UEFA
Rules for classification: Qualification tiebreakers
(H) Hosts
13 September 2014
08:00

Ukraine	1–0	Azerbaijan
Holovach 64'	Report

Bayil Stadium, Baku
Referee: Ivana Vlaić (Bosnia and Herzegovina)
13 September 2014
16:00

Denmark	3–0	Cyprus
Arngrimsen 19', 41', 63'	Report

Bayil Stadium, Baku
Referee: Graziella Pirriatore (Italy)

15 September 2014
13:00

Cyprus	1–3	Ukraine
Violari 39'	Report	Mokhnach 58'; Kozyrenko 61'; Holovach 82'

Bayil Stadium, Baku
Referee: Ivana Vlaić (Bosnia and Herzegovina)
15 September 2014
16:00

Denmark	3–0	Azerbaijan
Sørensen 8', 58'; Arngrimsen 35'	Report

Bayil Stadium, Baku
Referee: Désirée Grundbacher (Switzerland)

18 September 2014
08:00

Ukraine	1–4	Denmark
Kozyrenko 2' (pen.)	Report	Schioldan 45+2'; Madsen 52'; Andersen 79'; Arngrimsen 90+3'

Dalga Arena, Baku
Referee: Graziella Pirriatore (Italy)
18 September 2014
08:00

Azerbaijan	0–0	Cyprus
	Report

Bayil Stadium, Baku
Referee: Désirée Grundbacher (Switzerland)

==== Group 3 ====
Pos	Team	Pld	W	D	L	GF	GA	GD	Pts	Qualification
1	Norway	3	2	1	0	14	0	+14	7	Elite round
2	Scotland	3	2	1	0	11	1	+10	7	Elite round
3	Poland	3	1	0	2	6	6	0	3	
4	Albania (H)	3	0	0	3	0	24	−24	0	

Source: UEFA
Rules for classification: Qualification tiebreakers
(H) Hosts
13 September 2014
12:00

Norway	3–0	Poland
Markussen 9'; Sævik 50'; Jensen 90+1'	Report

Loni Papuçiu Stadium, Fier
Referee: Knarik Grigoryan (Armenia)
13 September 2014
15:00

Scotland	8–0	Albania
Howat 17', 51'; Arnot 37'; Ness 45', 60'; McLauchlan 67'; McKerlie 74'; Graham 90+4'	Report

Flamurtari Stadium, Vlorë
Referee: Tanja Subotič (Slovenia)

15 September 2014
12:00

Poland	1–3	Scotland
Zapała 46'	Report	Graham 35'; Harrison 40', 42'

Loni Papuçiu Stadium, Fier
Referee: Tanja Subotič (Slovenia)
15 September 2014
15:00

Norway	11–0	Albania
Hiim 12', 45+2', 66', 80', 85'; Jensen 41', 49'; Andreassen 53'; Fridlund 74'; Lund 89'; Lie 90+4'	Report

Flamurtari Stadium, Vlorë
Referee: Eleni Antoniou (Greece)

18 September 2014
15:00

Scotland	0–0	Norway
	Report

Loni Papuçiu Stadium, Fier
Referee: Knarik Grigoryan (Armenia)
18 September 2014
15:00

Albania	0–5	Poland
	Report	Grabowska 17'; Bolko 38'; Wiankowska 49', 69'; Matysik 86'

Flamurtari Stadium, Vlorë
Referee: Eleni Antoniou (Greece)

==== Group 4 ====
Pos	Team	Pld	W	D	L	GF	GA	GD	Pts	Qualification
1	Italy	3	3	0	0	12	0	+12	9	Elite round
2	Turkey (H)	3	1	1	1	7	3	+4	4	Elite round
3	Wales	3	1	1	1	4	5	−1	4	
4	Kazakhstan	3	0	0	3	2	17	−15	0	

Source: UEFA
Rules for classification: Qualification tiebreakers
(H) Hosts
13 September 2014
13:00

Wales	3–1	Kazakhstan
Murphy 17'; Evans 34'; Lloyd 66'	Report	Saparova 42'

Minareliçavuş Spor Tesisleri, Bursa
Referee: Ivana Projkovska (Macedonia)
13 September 2014
15:00

Italy	1–0	Turkey
Giugliano 59'	Report

Şehir Stadium, İnegöl
Referee: Kateryna Zora (Ukraine)

15 September 2014
13:00

Italy	8–0	Kazakhstan
Giugliano 3', 64' (pen.); Garavelli 6'; Bergamaschi 42', 53'; Pittaccio 76'; Goldoni 80'; Vergani 84'	Report

Minareliçavuş Spor Tesisleri, Bursa
Referee: Sarah Garratt (England)
15 September 2014
13:00

Turkey	1–1	Wales
Erdoğan 3'	Report	Hosford 34'

Şehir Stadium, İnegöl
Referee: Ivana Projkovska (Macedonia)

18 September 2014
13:00

Wales	0–3	Italy
	Report	Evans 14' (o.g.); Galli 52'; Bergamaschi 79'

Minareliçavuş Spor Tesisleri, Bursa
Referee: Kateryna Zora (Ukraine)
18 September 2014
13:00

Kazakhstan	1–6	Turkey
Bortnikova 68'	Report	Topçu 2', 15' (pen.), 70'; Baturay 67'; Dişli 80'; Sivrikaya 88' (pen.)

Şehir Stadium, İnegöl
Referee: Sarah Garratt (England)

==== Group 5 ====
Pos	Team	Pld	W	D	L	GF	GA	GD	Pts	Qualification
1	Netherlands	3	3	0	0	21	1	+20	9	Elite round
2	Serbia (H)	3	2	0	1	11	5	+6	6	Elite round
3	Faroe Islands	3	1	0	2	5	14	−9	3	
4	Latvia	3	0	0	3	1	18	−17	0	

Source: UEFA
Rules for classification: Qualification tiebreakers
(H) Hosts
13 September 2014
16:00

Netherlands	9–0	Faroe Islands
Roord 6', 17', 52', 88'; Folkertsma 24'; Strik 43'; Beerensteyn 61', 76'; Hendriks 85'	Report

FK Srem, Jakovo
Attendance: 20
Referee: Justina Lavrenovaite (Lithuania)
13 September 2014
16:00

Serbia	5–1	Latvia
Petrov 17', 75'; Delić 49', 69'; Pantelić 68'	Report	Strautiņa 78'

Sports Center of FA of Serbia, Stara Pazova
Attendance: 50
Referee: Galiya Echeva (Bulgaria)

15 September 2014
16:00

Netherlands	10–0	Latvia
Kaagman 22'; Roord 26' (pen.), 71', 82', 90+2'; Van Der Linden 37'; Folkertsma 50', 73'; Bruinenberg 59'; Hendriks 86'	Report

Sports Center of FA of Serbia, Stara Pazova
Attendance: 30
Referee: Cristina Bujor (Romania)
15 September 2014
16:00

Faroe Islands	2–5	Serbia
Simonsen 13', 44'	Report	Racić 30'; Petrov 50'; Pantelić 57'; Matić 62'; Stevanović 90+2'

Suvača Sportcenter, Pećinci
Attendance: 60
Referee: Galiya Echeva (Bulgaria)

18 September 2014
16:00

Serbia	1–2	Netherlands
Petrov 65'	Report	Kaagman 76'; Roord 88'

Sports Center of FA of Serbia, Stara Pazova
Attendance: 110
Referee: Justina Lavrenovaite (Lithuania)
18 September 2014
16:00

Latvia	0–3	Faroe Islands
	Report	Á. Johannesen 16'; J. Olsen 46'; Lervig 65'

Suvača Sportcenter, Pećinci
Attendance: 30
Referee: Cristina Bujor (Romania)

==== Group 6 ====
Pos	Team	Pld	W	D	L	GF	GA	GD	Pts	Qualification
1	Sweden (H)	3	3	0	0	20	1	+19	9	Elite round
2	Republic of Ireland	3	1	1	1	5	6	−1	4	
3	Moldova	3	1	1	1	4	6	−2	4	
4	Montenegro	3	0	0	3	2	18	−16	0	

Source: UEFA
Rules for classification: Qualification tiebreakers
(H) Hosts
13 September 2014
15:00

Sweden	3–0	Moldova
Almqvist 2'; Blackstenius 20'; Björn 43'	Report

Vilans IP, Kristianstad
Referee: Vesna Budimir (Croatia)
13 September 2014
15:00

Republic of Ireland	3–0	Montenegro
Carroll 21', 55'; Connolly 43' (pen.)	Report

Staffanstorp, Staffanstorp
Referee: Barbara Bollenberg (Austria)

15 September 2014
15:00

Moldova	1–1	Republic of Ireland
Tonu 87'	Report	Connolly 8'

Vilans IP, Kristianstad
Referee: Barbara Bollenberg (Austria)
15 September 2014
18:00

Sweden	12–0	Montenegro
Bojat 1' (o.g.); Almqvist 22'; Blackstenius 27', 36', 42', 82', 90', 90+1' (pen.); Zigiotti Olme 56'; Persson 57'; Göthberg 84'; Norrhamn 87'	Report

Vångavallen, Trelleborg
Referee: Beatriz Gil Gozalo (Spain)

18 September 2014
14:00

Republic of Ireland	1–5	Sweden
Connolly 21'	Report	Blackstenius 45+4', 46', 60', 83'; Hallin 89'

Staffanstorp, Staffanstorp
Referee: Vesna Budimir (Croatia)
18 September 2014
14:00

Montenegro	2–3	Moldova
Bojat 31', 41'	Report	Culcițchi 59'; Mițul 79' (pen.); Loghin 82'

Vångavallen, Trelleborg
Referee: Beatriz Gil Gozalo (Spain)

==== Group 7 ====
Pos	Team	Pld	W	D	L	GF	GA	GD	Pts	Qualification
1	Czech Republic	3	2	0	1	8	1	+7	6	Elite round
2	Romania	3	1	2	0	2	1	+1	5	Elite round
3	Bosnia and Herzegovina (H)	3	1	1	1	5	4	+1	4	
4	Malta	3	0	1	2	1	10	−9	1	

Source: UEFA
Rules for classification: Qualification tiebreakers
(H) Hosts
13 September 2014
15:00

Czech Republic	2–0	Bosnia and Herzegovina
Jablončíková 17'; Křivská 37'	Report

Asim Ferhatović Hase Stadium, Sarajevo
Referee: Marte Sørø (Norway)
13 September 2014
15:00

Romania	0–0	Malta
	Report

Stadion Otoka, Sarajevo
Referee: Marta Frias Acedo (Spain)

15 September 2014
15:00

Czech Republic	6–0	Malta
Hloupá 7'; Černá 17', 40'; Jablončíková 56'; Němečková 86'; Chlumová 90+2'	Report

Stadion Otoka, Sarajevo
Referee: Lorraine Clark (Scotland)
15 September 2014
15:00

Bosnia and Herzegovina	1–1	Romania
Šakotić 76'	Report	Bistrian 90+5'

Asim Ferhatović Hase Stadium, Sarajevo
Referee: Marta Frias Acedo (Spain)

18 September 2014
15:00

Romania	1–0	Czech Republic
Bistrian 34'	Report

Stadion Otoka, Sarajevo
Referee: Marte Sørø (Norway)
18 September 2014
15:00

Malta	1–4	Bosnia and Herzegovina
B. Borg 67'	Report	Radeljić 24'; Aleksić 42' (pen.); Koprena 52'; Kamerić 60'

Asim Ferhatović Hase Stadium, Sarajevo
Referee: Lorraine Clark (Scotland)

==== Group 8 ====
Pos	Team	Pld	W	D	L	GF	GA	GD	Pts	Qualification
1	Russia	3	3	0	0	14	0	+14	9	Elite round
2	Portugal (H)	3	2	0	1	15	1	+14	6	Elite round
3	Macedonia	3	0	1	2	2	15	−13	1	
4	Belarus	3	0	1	2	2	17	−15	1	

Source: UEFA
Rules for classification: Qualification tiebreakers
(H) Hosts
13 September 2014
15:00

Russia	9–0	Belarus
Chernomyrdina 20', 43'; Andreeva 29'; Smirnova 48', 50', 79'; Berezina 59', 63'; Belomyttseva 90+1'	Report

Estádio do Fontelo, Viseu
Referee: Valentina Garoffolo (Italy)
13 September 2014
17:00

Portugal	9–0	Macedonia
Cardoso 7', 47'; Malho 32', 90'; Norton 45', 62', 74'; Pinto 64'; Azevedo 90+2'	Report

Estádio João Cardoso, Tondela
Referee: Marija Kurtes (Germany)

15 September 2014
15:00

Macedonia	0–4	Russia
	Report	Berezina 1', 20'; Belomyttseva 18'; Chernomyrdina 90+2'

Municipal, Santa Comba Dão
Referee: Valentina Garoffolo (Italy)
15 September 2014
17:00

Portugal	6–0	Belarus
Figueiras 41', 79'; Malho 43', 85'; Norton 49'; I. Silva 76'	Report

Parque Desportivo de Sant Ana, Penalva do Castelo
Referee: Henrikke Nervik (Norway)

18 September 2014
17:00

Russia	1–0	Portugal
Belomyttseva 15'	Report

Nelas Municipal Stadium, Nelas
Referee: Marija Kurtes (Germany)
18 September 2014
17:00

Belarus	2–2	Macedonia
Shuppo 2', 36'	Report	Levkova 17'; Krstanovska 40'

Mangualde Municipal Stadium, Mangualde
Referee: Henrikke Nervik (Norway)

==== Group 9 ====
Pos	Team	Pld	W	D	L	GF	GA	GD	Pts	Qualification
1	Belgium	3	3	0	0	7	1	+6	9	Elite round
2	Slovenia	3	2	0	1	5	6	−1	6	Elite round
3	Hungary (H)	3	1	0	2	5	3	+2	3	
4	Estonia	3	0	0	3	2	9	−7	0	

Source: UEFA
Rules for classification: Qualification tiebreakers
(H) Hosts
13 September 2014
13:00

Belgium	4–0	Slovenia
Van Ackere 13', 45+2', 59'; Maximus 47'	Report

Bük Stadium, Bük
Referee: Irina Turovskaya (Belarus)
13 September 2014
18:00

Hungary	4–0	Estonia
D. Szabó 27'; Nagypál 36'; V. Szabó 41'; Dencz 82'	Report

Bük Stadium, Bük
Referee: Vivian Peeters (Netherlands)

15 September 2014
12:30

Belgium	1–0	Estonia
Iliano 19'	Report

Bük Stadium, Bük
Referee: Lina Lehtovaara (Finland)
15 September 2014
16:30

Slovenia	1–0	Hungary
Predanič 60'	Report

Bük Stadium, Bük
Referee: Irina Turovskaya (Belarus)

18 September 2014
15:30

Hungary	1–2	Belgium
Csorbai 74' (pen.)	Report	Baldewijns 45+3'; Maximus 55'

Perutz Stadion, Pápa
Referee: Lina Lehtovaara (Finland)
18 September 2014
15:30

Estonia	2–4	Slovenia
Vilipuu 4', 28'	Report	Uueda 43' (o.g.); Kos 45'; Kržan 55'; Ivanuša 90+1'

Bük Stadium, Bük
Referee: Vivian Peeters (Netherlands)

==== Group 10 ====
Pos	Team	Pld	W	D	L	GF	GA	GD	Pts	Qualification
1	Finland (H)	3	3	0	0	14	0	+14	9	Elite round
2	Northern Ireland	3	2	0	1	9	3	+6	6	Elite round
3	Greece	3	1	0	2	8	5	+3	3	
4	Georgia	3	0	0	3	0	23	−23	0	

Source: UEFA
Rules for classification: Qualification tiebreakers
(H) Hosts
13 September 2014
12:00

Finland	4–0	Greece
Kollanen 43', 70'; Hakala 64'; Tunturi 81'	Report

Eerikkilä Areena, Tammela
Referee: Ana Minić (Serbia)
13 September 2014
16:00

Northern Ireland	8–0	Georgia
Feehan 7', 25', 55' (pen.); Timoney 30'; Mcglade 37', 90'; Kelly 48'; Carleton 63'	Report

Eerikkilä Areena, Tammela
Referee: Aleksandra Česen (Slovenia)

15 September 2014
13:00

Greece	0–1	Northern Ireland
	Report	Feehan 56'

Eerikkilä Areena, Tammela
Referee: Aleksandra Česen (Slovenia)
15 September 2014
18:00

Finland	7–0	Georgia
Ahtinen 5', 44', 67'; Heikkilä 37'; Kollanen 48'; Savolainen 86'; Tunturi 90+3' (pen.)	Report

Eerikkilä Areena, Tammela
Referee: Elvira Nurmustafina (Kazakhstan)

18 September 2014
15:00

Northern Ireland	0–3	Finland
	Report	Heikkilä 26', 67', 71'

Keskusliikuntapuisto, Kaarina
Referee: Ana Minić (Serbia)
18 September 2014
15:00

Georgia	0–8	Greece
	Report	Sakellari 9', 12', 45+2', 80'; Plyta 33'; Gkatsou 59'; Kaldaridou 71'; Moraitou 83' (pen.)

Eerikkilä Areena, Tammela
Referee: Elvira Nurmustafina (Kazakhstan)

==== Group 11 ====
Pos	Team	Pld	W	D	L	GF	GA	GD	Pts	Qualification
1	Switzerland	3	3	0	0	16	0	+16	9	Elite round
2	Austria	3	2	0	1	11	2	+9	6	Elite round
3	Slovakia	3	1	0	2	7	10	−3	3	
4	Bulgaria (H)	3	0	0	3	2	24	−22	0	

Source: UEFA
Rules for classification: Qualification tiebreakers
(H) Hosts
13 September 2014
16:00

Switzerland	5–0	Slovakia
Glaser 21', 64'; Selimi 53'; Widmer 82'; Zehnder 83'	Report

Albena 1, Albena
Referee: Florence Guillemin (France)
13 September 2014
16:00

Austria	8–0	Bulgaria
Malle 5'; Krammer 20'; Aufhauser 29', 30', 44', 66'; Dunst 45+1'; Maierhofer 74'	Report

Kavarna Stadium, Kavarna
Referee: Ivana Martinčić (Croatia)

15 September 2014
16:00

Switzerland	9–0	Bulgaria
Calligaris 4', 10'; Glaser 12', 51', 85'; Stierli 14' (pen.); Zehnder 36', 90+2'; Ramseier 45+2'	Report

Kavarna Stadium, Kavarna
Referee: Ifeoma Kulmala (Finland)
15 September 2014
16:00

Slovakia	0–3	Austria
	Report	Georgieva 20' (pen.); Mahr 73'; Krammer 90' (pen.)

Albena 1, Albena
Referee: Ivana Martinčić (Croatia)

18 September 2014
16:00

Austria	0–2	Switzerland
	Report	Glaser 23'; Müller 69'

Albena 1, Albena
Referee: Florence Guillemin (France)
18 September 2014
16:00

Bulgaria	2–7	Slovakia
Bandeva 43'; Popadiynova 64'	Report	Švecová 31'; Čopíková 54', 77', 90+2'; Nižňanská 68', 69'; Moťovská 75'

Kavarna Stadium, Kavarna
Referee: Ifeoma Kulmala (Finland)

=== Ranking of second-placed teams ===
To determine the ten best second-placed teams from the qualifying round which advanced to the elite round, only the results of the second-placed teams against the first and third-placed teams in their group were taken into account.

Pos	Grp	Team	Pld	W	D	L	GF	GA	GD	Pts	Qualification
1	3	Scotland	2	1	1	0	3	1	+2	4	Elite round
2	7	Romania	2	1	1	0	2	1	+1	4	Elite round
3	8	Portugal	2	1	0	1	9	1	+8	3	Elite round
4	5	Serbia	2	1	0	1	6	4	+2	3	Elite round
5	11	Austria	2	1	0	1	3	2	+1	3	Elite round
6	1	Iceland	2	1	0	1	2	2	0	3	Elite round
7	2	Ukraine	2	1	0	1	2	4	−2	3	Elite round
8	10	Northern Ireland	2	1	0	1	1	3	−2	3	Elite round
9	9	Slovenia	2	1	0	1	1	4	−3	3	Elite round
10	4	Turkey	2	0	1	1	1	2	−1	1	Elite round
11	6	Republic of Ireland	2	0	1	1	2	6	−4	1	

Source: UEFA
Rules for classification: 1) points; 2) goal difference; 3) number of goals scored; 4) disciplinary points; 5) drawing of lots.

== Elite round ==
=== Draw ===
The draw for the elite round was held at UEFA headquarters in Nyon, Switzerland on 19 November 2014 at 11:30 CET (UTC+1).

The teams were seeded according to their results in the qualifying round. Germany, England and France, which received byes to the elite round, were automatically seeded into Pot A. Each group contained one team from Pot A, one team from Pot B, one team from Pot C, and one team from Pot D. Teams from the same qualifying round group could not be drawn in the same group.

Before the draw UEFA confirmed that, for political reasons, Ukraine and Russia could not be drawn in the same group due to the Russian military intervention in Ukraine.

Pos	Grp	Team	Pld	W	D	L	GF	GA	GD	Pts	Seeding
1	—	Germany	0	0	0	0	0	0	0	0	Pot A
2	—	England	0	0	0	0	0	0	0	0	Pot A
3	—	France	0	0	0	0	0	0	0	0	Pot A
4	1	Spain	3	3	0	0	23	1	+22	9	Pot A
5	5	Netherlands	3	3	0	0	21	1	+20	9	Pot A
6	6	Sweden	3	3	0	0	20	1	+19	9	Pot A
7	11	Switzerland	3	3	0	0	16	0	+16	9	Pot B
8	10	Finland	3	3	0	0	14	0	+14	9 (Note: Tie broken by fair play ranking.)	Pot B
9	8	Russia	3	3	0	0	14	0	+14	9	Pot B
10	4	Italy	3	3	0	0	12	0	+12	9	Pot B
11	2	Denmark	3	3	0	0	10	1	+9	9	Pot B
12	9	Belgium	3	3	0	0	7	1	+6	9	Pot B
13	3	Norway	3	2	1	0	14	0	+14	7	Pot C
14	3	Scotland	3	2	1	0	11	1	+10	7	Pot C
15	8	Portugal	3	2	0	1	15	1	+14	6	Pot C
16	11	Austria	3	2	0	1	11	2	+9	6	Pot C
17	1	Iceland	3	2	0	1	10	2	+8	6	Pot C
18	7	Czech Republic	3	2	0	1	8	1	+7	6	Pot C
19	5	Serbia	3	2	0	1	11	5	+6	6	Pot D
20	10	Northern Ireland	3	2	0	1	9	3	+6	6	Pot D
21	2	Ukraine	3	2	0	1	5	5	0	6	Pot D
22	9	Slovenia	3	2	0	1	5	6	−1	6	Pot D
23	7	Romania	3	1	2	0	2	1	+1	5	Pot D
24	4	Turkey	3	1	1	1	7	3	+4	4	Pot D

Source: UEFA
Rules for classification: 1) points; 2) goal difference; 3) number of goals scored; 4) fair play ranking; 5) drawing of lots.

=== Groups ===
All times were CEST (UTC+2).

==== Group 1 ====
Pos	Team	Pld	W	D	L	GF	GA	GD	Pts	Qualification
1	Spain	3	3	0	0	13	0	+13	9	Final tournament
2	Portugal (H)	3	1	1	1	2	3	−1	4	
3	Finland	3	0	2	1	3	9	−6	2	
4	Turkey	3	0	1	2	2	8	−6	1	

Source: UEFA
Rules for classification: Qualification tiebreakers
(H) Hosts
4 April 2015
15:00

Finland	2–2	Turkey
Collin 48'; Kollanen 66'	Report	Topçu 36'; Bakır 90+2'

Estádio Fernando Cabrita, Lagos
Referee: Séverine Zinck (France)
4 April 2015
17:00

Spain	2–0	Portugal
García 15'; Domínguez 90+4'	Report

Estádio da Nora, Ferreiras
Referee: Eleni Lampadariou (Greece)

6 April 2015
15:00

Spain	5–0	Turkey
García 6', 32'; Falcón 43', 51'; Turmo 76'	Report

Estádio Algarve, Faro-Loulé
Referee: Rhona Daly (Republic of Ireland)
6 April 2015
17:00

Portugal	1–1	Finland
Malho 19' (pen.)	Report	Kollanen 81'

Municipal Stadium Bela Vista, Parchal
Referee: Séverine Zinck (France)

9 April 2015
17:00

Finland	0–6	Spain
	Report	Ortega 12', 29'; Caldentey 31'; Redondo 46', 79'; Domínguez 77'

Municipal Stadium Bela Vista, Parchal
Referee: Eleni Lampadariou (Greece)
9 April 2015
17:00

Turkey	0–1	Portugal
	Report	Marchão 63'

Estádio da Nora, Ferreiras
Referee: Rhona Daly (Republic of Ireland)

==== Group 2 ====
Pos	Team	Pld	W	D	L	GF	GA	GD	Pts	Qualification
1	Sweden	3	2	1	0	6	3	+3	7	Final tournament
2	Italy	3	2	0	1	8	6	+2	6	
3	Austria	3	1	1	1	7	4	+3	4	
4	Serbia (H)	3	0	0	3	5	13	−8	0	

Source: UEFA
Rules for classification: Qualification tiebreakers
(H) Hosts
4 April 2015
15:00

Sweden	0–0	Austria
	Report

Stadion Srem Jakovo, Jakovo
Referee: Anastasia Pustovoitova (Russia)
4 April 2015
15:00

Italy	4–2	Serbia
Giugliano 4', 37'; Bergamaschi 10'; Mellano 63'	Report	Petrov 34'; Matić 50'

Sports Center of FA of Serbia, Stara Pazova
Referee: Karolina Radzik-Johan (Poland)

6 April 2015
15:00

Sweden	4–2	Serbia
Zigiotti Olme 14'; Blackstenius 29', 43'; Jansson 83'	Report	Poljak 24', 90+3'

Suvača Sportcenter, Pećinci
Referee: Marta Frias Acedo (Spain)
6 April 2015
15:00

Austria	2–3	Italy
Billa 87'; Mahr 89'	Report	Piemonte 35'; Mellano 77'; Bergamaschi 83'

Sports Center of FA of Serbia, Stara Pazova
Referee: Karolina Radzik-Johan (Poland)

9 April 2015
15:00

Italy	1–2	Sweden
Bergamaschi 22'	Report	Blackstenius 64'; E. Andersson 89'

Suvača Sportcenter, Pećinci
Referee: Anastasia Pustovoitova (Russia)
9 April 2015
15:00

Serbia	1–5	Austria
Poljak 65'	Report	Billa 10'; Leitner 25', 45+2'; Schwarzlmüller 28'; Dunst 81'

Sports Center of FA of Serbia, Stara Pazova
Referee: Marta Frias Acedo (Spain)

==== Group 3 ====
Pos	Team	Pld	W	D	L	GF	GA	GD	Pts	Qualification
1	France (H)	3	3	0	0	8	0	+8	9	Final tournament
2	Russia	3	2	0	1	6	2	+4	6	
3	Iceland	3	1	0	2	4	9	−5	3	
4	Romania	3	0	0	3	0	7	−7	0	

Source: UEFA
Rules for classification: Qualification tiebreakers
(H) Hosts
4 April 2015
16:00

France	5–0	Iceland
Lahmari 28'; Léger 41', 53', 58'; Cascarino 68'	Report

Stade Municipal, Melun
Referee: Esther Azzopardi (Malta)
4 April 2015
18:00

Russia	2–0	Romania
Chernomyrdina 28'; David 85' (o.g.)	Report

Stade des 3 sapins, Ozoir-la-Ferrière
Referee: Lorraine Clark (Scotland)

6 April 2015
16:00

France	2–0	Romania
Salomon 7'; Léger 76'	Report

Stade des 3 sapins, Ozoir-la-Ferrière
Referee: Vesna Budimir (Croatia)
6 April 2015
18:00

Iceland	1–4	Russia
Hlynsdóttir 45'	Report	Chernomyrdina 17', 58' (pen.); Andreeva 25', 35'

Stade Municipal, Melun
Referee: Lorraine Clark (Scotland)

9 April 2015
18:00

Russia	0–1	France
	Report	Léger 75' (pen.)

Stade Municipal, Melun
Referee: Esther Azzopardi (Malta)
9 April 2015
18:00

Romania	0–3	Iceland
	Report	H. Arnarsdóttir 16'; H. Sigurjonsdóttir 23'; H. Jónsdóttir 89'

Stade des 3 sapins, Ozoir-la-Ferrière
Referee: Vesna Budimir (Croatia)

==== Group 4 ====
Pos	Team	Pld	W	D	L	GF	GA	GD	Pts	Qualification
1	England	3	2	1	0	14	4	+10	7	Final tournament
2	Norway	3	2	1	0	12	3	+9	7	Final tournament
3	Switzerland	3	1	0	2	2	5	−3	3	
4	Northern Ireland (H)	3	0	0	3	2	18	−16	0	

Source: UEFA
Rules for classification: Qualification tiebreakers
(H) Hosts
4 April 2015
21:00

England	2–2	Norway
Ayane 88'; Williamson 90+6' (pen.)	Report	Fjelldal 59'; Bartrip 86' (o.g.)

Seaview, Belfast
Referee: Marija Kurtes (Germany) and Kateryna Zora (Ukraine)

In the 4 April game between England and Norway, the referee Marija Kurtes disallowed a penalty for England in the 90+6th minute (Norway were leading 2–1 at that time) due to encroachment, but instead of the penalty being retaken, which should have happened under the laws of the game, a free kick to Norway was awarded. England appealed the decision after the match and UEFA ruled that the match was to be replayed starting from the penalty kick. The match was replayed on 9 April 2015, 22:45 CEST (after the third round of matches was completed earlier in the day), with the same players who were on the field at the time of the penalty but under a different referee, Kateryna Zora (as the original referee had been sent home due to the error). England converted the penalty to tie the match at 2–2, and this remained the final score.

4 April 2015
21:00

Switzerland	1–0	Northern Ireland
Calligaris 31'	Report

Solitude, Belfast
Referee: Elia Martínez (Spain)

6 April 2015
14:00

Norway	2–0	Switzerland
Hasund 3', 24'	Report

Solitude, Belfast
Referee: Elia Martínez (Spain)
6 April 2015
17:00

England	9–1	Northern Ireland
Brett 27'; Flint 30', 33', 40'; Williamson 37' (pen.), 87' (pen.); Mayling 50'; Zelem 59'; Turner 90+1'	Report	Mackin 10'

Seaview, Belfast
Referee: Kateryna Zora (Ukraine)

9 April 2015
16:00

Switzerland	1–3	England
Widmer 29'	Report	Dear 27', 83'; Williamson 61' (pen.)

Seaview, Belfast
Referee: Elia Martínez (Spain)
9 April 2015
16:00

Northern Ireland	1–8	Norway
Mackin 15'	Report	Rafferty 8' (o.g.); Fridlund 8'; Fjelldal 14'; Markussen 30'; Lie 58'; Lund 74', 89'; Velta 90+3'

Solitude, Belfast
Referee: Kateryna Zora (Ukraine)

==== Group 5 ====
Pos	Team	Pld	W	D	L	GF	GA	GD	Pts	Qualification
1	Germany (H)	3	3	0	0	18	1	+17	9	Final tournament
2	Belgium	3	1	1	1	4	5	−1	4	
3	Scotland	3	1	1	1	5	8	−3	4	
4	Ukraine	3	0	0	3	0	13	−13	0	

Source: UEFA
Rules for classification: Qualification tiebreakers
(H) Hosts
4 April 2015
11:00

Belgium	1–0	Ukraine
Maximus 84'	Report

Waldseestadion, Forst
Referee: Marte Sørø (Norway)
4 April 2015
14:00

Germany	6–0	Scotland
Schüller 10', 33'; Freigang 17', 40', 50', 60'	Report

Waldseestadion, Forst
Referee: Olga Zadinová (Czech Republic)

6 April 2015
11:00

Scotland	2–2	Belgium
Arnot 48', 80'	Report	Maximus 45+3'; Hannecart 67'

Stadion SV 98 Schwetzingen, Schwetzingen
Referee: Marte Sørø (Norway)
6 April 2015
14:00

Germany	9–0	Ukraine
Freigang 14'; Rauch 33' (pen.); Ehegötz 39'; Kravchuk 57' (o.g.); Gier 59', 64'; Schüller 74', 82'; Knaak 89'	Report

Stadion SV 98 Schwetzingen, Schwetzingen
Referee: Tania Fernandes Morais (Luxembourg)

9 April 2015
11:00

Belgium	1–3	Germany
Maximus 90+2'	Report	Vanwynsberghe 16' (o.g.); Vangheluwe 60' (o.g.); Gier 79'

Waldseestadion, Forst
Referee: Olga Zadinová (Czech Republic)
9 April 2015
11:00

Ukraine	0–3	Scotland
	Report	Howat 44'; Arnot 57'; Stewart 77'

Stadion SV 98 Schwetzingen, Schwetzingen
Referee: Tania Fernandes Morais (Luxembourg)

==== Group 6 ====
Pos	Team	Pld	W	D	L	GF	GA	GD	Pts	Qualification
1	Denmark	3	3	0	0	7	1	+6	9	Final tournament
2	Netherlands (H)	3	2	0	1	9	1	+8	6	
3	Czech Republic	3	1	0	2	3	8	−5	3	
4	Slovenia	3	0	0	3	0	9	−9	0	

Source: UEFA
Rules for classification: Qualification tiebreakers
(H) Hosts
4 April 2015
15:00

Netherlands	6–0	Czech Republic
Admiraal 5', 42'; Sanders 14'; Kubicová 34' (o.g.); Kaagman 53' (pen.); Van Der Linden 77'	Report

Sportpark Marsana, Meerssen
Referee: Lina Lehtovaara (Finland)
4 April 2015
17:00

Denmark	4–0	Slovenia
Henriksen 14'; Bruun 43'; Andersen 66'; Vangsgaard 82'	Report

Sportcomplex Strijthagen, Landgraaf
Referee: Florence Guillemin (France)

6 April 2015
15:00

Netherlands	3–0	Slovenia
Hoekstra 50'; Folkertsma 52', 74'	Report

Sportcomplex Strijthagen, Landgraaf
Referee: Ana Minić (Serbia)
6 April 2015
17:00

Czech Republic	1–2	Denmark
Křivská 68'	Report	Sevecke 20'; Bruun 83'

Sportpark Marsana, Meerssen
Referee: Florence Guillemin (France)

9 April 2015
18:00

Denmark	1–0	Netherlands
Bruun 6'	Report

Sportpark Marsana, Meerssen
Referee: Lina Lehtovaara (Finland)
9 April 2015
18:00

Slovenia	0–2	Czech Republic
	Report	Křivská 4'; Černá 53'

Sportcomplex Strijthagen, Landgraaf
Referee: Ana Minić (Serbia)

=== Ranking of second-placed teams ===
To determine the best second-placed team from the elite round which qualified for the final tournament, only the results of the second-placed teams against the first and third-placed teams in their group were taken into account.

Pos	Grp	Team	Pld	W	D	L	GF	GA	GD	Pts	Qualification
1	4	Norway	2	1	1	0	4	2	+2	4	Final tournament
2	6	Netherlands	2	1	0	1	6	1	+5	3	
3	3	Russia	2	1	0	1	4	2	+2	3	
4	2	Italy	2	1	0	1	4	4	0	3	
5	5	Belgium	2	0	1	1	3	5	−2	1	
6	1	Portugal	2	0	1	1	1	3	−2	1	

Source: UEFA
Rules for classification: 1) points; 2) goal difference; 3) number of goals scored; 4) disciplinary points; 5) drawing of lots.

== Qualified teams ==
The following eight teams qualified for the final tournament.

Team	Qualified as	Qualified on	Previous appearances in tournament^{1} only U-19 era (since 2002)
Israel	Hosts	20 March 2012	0 (debut)
Spain	Elite round Group 1 winners	6 April 2015	9 (2002, 2003, **2004**, 2007, 2008, 2010, 2011, 2012, 2014)
Sweden	Elite round Group 2 winners	9 April 2015	8 (2002, 2003, 2006, 2008, 2009, **2012**, 2013, 2014)
France	Elite round Group 3 winners	9 April 2015	10 (2002, **2003**, 2004, 2005, 2006, 2007, 2008, 2009, **2010**, **2013**)
England	Elite round Group 4 winners	9 April 2015	10 (2002, 2003, 2005, 2007, 2008, **2009**, 2010, 2012, 2013, 2014)
Germany	Elite round Group 5 winners	9 April 2015	11 (**2002**, 2003, 2004, 2005, **2006**, **2007**, 2008, 2009, 2010, **2011**, 2013)
Denmark	Elite round Group 6 winners	9 April 2015	5 (2002, 2006, 2007, 2012, 2013)
Norway	Elite round best runners-up	9 April 2015	9 (2002, 2003, 2004, 2007, 2008, 2009, 2011, 2013, 2014)

^{1} Bold indicates champion for that year. Italic indicates host for that year.

== Top goalscorers ==
The following players scored four goals or more in the qualifying competition.

14 goals

- (Sweden) Stina Blackstenius

9 goals

- (Netherlands) Jill Roord

8 goals

- (Spain) Andrea Falcón

7 goals

- (Spain) Mariona Caldentey
- (Spain) Nahikari García

6 goals

- (Italy) Valentina Bergamaschi
- (Russia) Margarita Chernomyrdina
- (Switzerland) Julia Glaser

5 goals

- (Belgium) Amber Maximus
- (Denmark) Tanya Arngrimsen
- (Finland) Heidi Kollanen
- (France) Marie-Charlotte Léger
- (Germany) Laura Freigang
- (Italy) Manuela Giugliano
- (Netherlands) Sippie Folkertsma
- (Norway) Maria Hiim
- (Portugal) Vanessa Malho
- (Serbia) Nataša Petrov

4 goals

- (Austria) Katharina Aufhauser
- (England) Leah Williamson
- (Finland) Emma Heikkilä
- (Germany) Lea Schüller
- (Greece) Georgia Sakellari
- (Northern Ireland) Moya Feehan
- (Portugal) Andreia Norton
- (Russia) Anastasiya Berezina
- (Scotland) Elizabeth Arnot
- (Spain) Pilar Garrote
- (Turkey) Ebru Topçu
