= Russia women's national under-17 football team =

National association football team

Russia Women's U-17
- Nickname: bears
- Association: Football Union of Russia
- Confederation: UEFA (Europe)
- Head coach: (Russia) Alexandr Schagov
- Captain: (Russia) Jana Litvinenko
- Top scorer: 7 - Alena Andreeva
- FIFA code: RUS
First colours	Second colours

First international
- Russia 3–1 Slovakia (Rustavi, Georgia; October 27, 2007)

Biggest win
- Russia 19–0 Armenia (Tabanovac, Serbia; October 24, 2009)

Biggest defeat
- Russia 0–9 Germany (Esbjerg, Denmark; April 23, 2011)

The Russia women's national under-17 football team is the national under-17 football team of Russia and is governed by the Football Union of Russia. On 28 February 2022, due to the 2022 Russian invasion of Ukraine and in accordance with a recommendation by the International Olympic Committee (IOC), FIFA and UEFA suspended the participation of Russia, including in the Qatar 2022 World Cup. The Russian Football Union unsuccessfully appealed the FIFA and UEFA bans to the Court of Arbitration for Sport, which upheld the bans. In October 2023, FIFA and UEFA lifted the ban on the team, allowing them to return to competitions. This was met with opposition from Ukraine and some other UEFA members. England, Poland, Latvia, Lithuania, Sweden, Denmark, Finland, Ireland, Norway, and Romania announced that they would not play the team if it was allowed back. UEFA later axed the plan.

== Competitive record ==
=== FIFA U-17 Women's World Cup ===
The team has never qualified for the FIFA U-17 Women's World Cup

Year	Result	Matches	Wins	Draws*	Losses	GF	GA
(New Zealand) 2008	Did not qualify						
(Trinidad and Tobago) 2010	Did not qualify						
(Azerbaijan) 2012	Did not qualify						
(Costa Rica) 2014	Did not qualify						
(Jordan) 2016	Did not qualify						
(Uruguay) 2018	Did not qualify						
(India) 2022	Suspended						
(Dominican Republic) 2024	Suspended						
(Morocco) 2025	Suspended						
(Morocco) 2026	Suspended						
(Morocco) 2027	Suspended						
(Morocco) 2028	To be determined						
(Morocco) 2029	To be determined						
Total	0/11	0	0	0	0	0	0

=== UEFA Women's Under-17 Championship ===
The team has never qualified for the UEFA Women's Under-17 Championship

Year	Result	MP	W	D	L	GF	GA
(Switzerland) 2008	Did not qualify						
(Switzerland) 2009	Did not qualify						
(Switzerland) 2010	Did not qualify						
(Switzerland) 2011	Did not qualify						
(Switzerland) 2012	Did not qualify						
(Switzerland) 2013	Did not qualify						
(England) 2014	Did not qualify						
(Iceland) 2015	Did not qualify						
(Belarus) 2016	Did not qualify						
(Czech Republic) 2017	Did not qualify						
(Lithuania) 2018	Did not qualify						
(Bulgaria) 2019	Did not qualify						
(Sweden) ~~2020~~	Cancelled						
(Faroe Islands) ~~2021~~	Cancelled						
(Bosnia and Herzegovina) 2022	Suspended						
(Estonia) 2023	Suspended						
(Sweden) 2024	Suspended						
(Faroe Islands) 2025	Suspended						
(Northern Ireland) 2026	Suspended						
(Finland) 2027	Suspended						
Total	0/19	0	0	0	0	0	0

== Results at official competitions ==
Friendly matches are not included. Win Draw Loss

Venue	Date	Opponent	Result	Scorers
2008 UEFA Championship First qualifying round – Group 10
Georgia
Georgia	Oct 27, 2007	Slovakia	3-1	Makarova 24', Aborovichute 53', 73'
Georgia	Oct 29, 2007	Georgia	3-0	Koltakova, Ananieva
Georgia	Nov 1, 2007	England	0–1	
2008 UEFA Championship Second qualifying round – Group 4
Denmark
Denmark	Mar 24, 2008	Iceland	4-3	Zinovieva, Gasparyan, Akimova
Denmark	Mar 26, 2008	Finland	0–1	
Denmark	Mar 29, 2008	Denmark	0–2	
2009 UEFA Championship First qualifying round – Group 7
Slovenia
Slovenia	Oct 15, 2008	Slovenia	5-0	Koltakova, Zinovieva, Frolova
Slovenia	Oct 17, 2008	Armenia	9-0	Deleva 11', 37', Kalacheva 13', Ananieva 26', 55', Zinovieva 38', 49', Cholovyaga 58', Soboleva 80'
Slovenia	Oct 20, 2008	Sweden	1-1	Zinovieva 18'
2009 UEFA Championship Second qualifying round – Group 3
Hungary
Hungary	Apr 9, 2009	Germany	0–4	
Hungary	Apr 11, 2009	Switzerland	1–2	Soboleva 60'
Hungary	Apr 14, 2009	Hungary	3-2	Frolova 20', Pozdeeva 30', Soboleva 65'
2010 UEFA Championship First qualifying round – Group 10
Serbia
Serbia	Oct 24, 2009	Armenia	19-0	Astankova 3', 50', Kobeleva 7', 11', 24', 54', 82', Efimova 17', Veselukha 31', 33', 65', Pozdeeva 35', 80', Odincova 38', Kiskonen 48', 63', Pasishnuk 62', Orlova 69', 72'
Serbia	Oct 26, 2009	Serbia	1–2	Kobeleva 7'
Serbia	Oct 29, 2009	Spain	0–3	
2011 UEFA Championship First qualifying round – Group 10
Russia
Russia	Sep 26, 2010	Greece	3-2	Piskunova 10', Veselukha 53', Kiskonen 66'
Russia	Sep 28, 2010	Faroe Islands	2-0	Kiskonen 12', Veselukha 29'
Russia	Oct 1, 2010	Wales	2-2	Piskunova 8', Veselukha 80+3' (pen.)
2011 UEFA Championship Second qualifying round – Group 3
Denmark
Denmark	Apr 21, 2011	Denmark	0–5	
Denmark	Apr 23, 2011	Germany	0–9	
Denmark	Apr 26, 2011	Finland	0–2	
2012 UEFA Championship First qualifying round – Group 4
Lithuania
Lithuania	Okt 2, 2011	Lithuania	2-0	Samoilova 28', Belomyttseva 45'
Lithuania	Oct 4, 2011	Slovenia	4-2	Samoilova 3', Piskunova 13', 33', 53'
Lithuania	Oct 7, 2011	Norway	0–2	
UEFA Women's Under-17 Development Cup
Switzerland
Switzerland	Apr 14, 2012	Scotland	0–3	
Switzerland	Apr 17, 2012	Montenegro	4-0	Kovalenko 16', Piskunova 24', Chernomyrdina 27', 80'
2013 UEFA Championship First qualifying round – Group 7
Greece
Greece	Okt 29, 2012	Romania	6-1	Andreeva 8', 50', 53', Bychkova 49', Belomyttseva 63', Chernomyrdina 80+1'
Greece	Okt 31, 2012	Greece	2-1	Danilova 39', Andreeva 52'
Greece	Nov 3, 2012	Germany	1–7	Belomyttseva 48'
International Women's Under-17 Tournament
Montenegro
Montenegro	Apr 16, 2013	Albania	12-0	Mashina 3', 10', Khotyreva 9', 29', Schahnazarova 17', 31', 32', Kolesnikova 24', Zelenova 49', 60', Bocharkina 61', 69'
Montenegro	Apr 18, 2013	Montenegro	2-1	Chernova 15', Khotyreva 25'
Belarus
Belarus	May 21, 2013	Ukraine	3-0	Khotyreva 15', 38', Aniskina 20'
Belarus	May 22, 2013	Belarus	3-0	Aniskina 15', Khotyreva 29', Simanovskaya 73'
Belarus	May 24, 2013	Kazakhstan	5-0	Bocharkina 7', Bichkova 14', Sokolova 19', Mashina 58', Khotyreva 73'
2014 UEFA Championship First qualifying round – Group 4
Russia
Russia	Aug 6, 2013	Turkey	1-0	Voloshina 44'
Russia	Aug 8, 2013	Bosnia and Herzegovina	1-0	Khotyreva 60'
Russia	Aug 11, 2013	Republic of Ireland	1-0	Khotyreva 42'
2014 UEFA Championship Second qualifying round – Group 2
Austria
Austria	Oct 8, 2013	Belarus	3-2	Andreeva 25', 27', Bichkova 76'
Austria	Oct 10, 2013	Greece	1-1	Zerva 52' (o.g.)
Austria	Oct 13, 2013	Austria	1–5	Andreeva 3'
International Women's Under-17 Tournament
Estonia
Estonia	May 2, 2014	Finland	0–4	
Estonia	May 3, 2014	Sweden	0–1	
Estonia	May 5, 2014	Estonia	10-0	Yakovleva 3', Voloshina 18', Drozdova 19', 46', 48', Carenkova 29', Trikina 43', Pahesh 52', 61', Kovalenko 71'
2015 UEFA Championship First qualifying round – Group 1
Bulgaria
Bulgaria	Oct 26, 2014	Bulgaria	1-0	Trikina 50'
Bulgaria	Oct 28, 2014	Moldova	7-1	Trikina 5', Voloshina 43', Drozdova 54', Bespalikova 62', Zarubina 72', 79', 80+2'
Bulgaria	Oct 31, 2014	England	1–4	Shvedova 32' (pen.)
2015 UEFA Championship Second qualifying round – Group 4
Russia
Russia	Mar 22, 2015	Spain	0–3	
Russia	Mar 24, 2015	Belgium	0–1	
Russia	Mar 27, 2015	Romania	2–5	Drozdova 35' (pen.), Bespalikova 26'
2016 UEFA Championship First qualifying round – Group 8
Romania
Romania	Oct 12, 2015	Romania	4-0	Guseva 49', 62', 69', Maksimova 75'
Romania	Oct 14, 2015	Slovakia	3-0	Dronova 11' (pen.), Guseva 29', Zarubina 50'
Romania	Oct 17, 2015	Sweden	0–2	
2016 UEFA Championship Second qualifying round – Group 1
Austria
Austria	Mar 19, 2016	Austria	0–4	
Austria	Mar 21, 2016	Germany	0–3	
Austria	Mar 24, 2016	Switzerland	1–4	Ruzina 7'

== Player history ==
=== Top goalscorers in the European Championships ===
Goalscorers with an equal number of goals are ranked in chronological order of reaching the milestone. Bold indicates still active players. As of 15 May 2014

#	Name	Career	Goals
1	Andreeva	2012–2013	7
2	Veselukha	2009–2010	6
3	Zinovieva	2008	6
4	Kobeleva	2009	6
