= 2020–21 Turkish Women's Football League =

Turkcell Women's Football League
- Season: 2020–21
- Dates: 17 April 2021 – 5 May 2021
- Champions: Beşiktaş J.K.
- Promoted: 1207 Antalya Spor; Dudullu Spor; İlkadım Belediyesi; Kayseri Gençler Birliği
- Champions League: Beşiktaş J.K.
- Matches: 32
- Goals: 116 (3.63 per match)
- Best Player: (Turkey) Cansu Nur Kaya
- Top goalscorer: (Turkey) Zelal Baturay
- Best goalkeeper: (Turkey) Fatma Şahin
- Highest scoring: 8-1
- All statistics correct as of 5 May 2021.

The 2020–21 Turkcell Women's Football League is the 25th season of Turkey's premier women's footballleague. The league, formerly called the Turkish Women's First Football League (Turkish: Kadınlar 1. Futbol LigiĬ), was renamed to Turkscell Women's Football League after a sponsorship agreement was signed on 8 March 2021, the International Women's Day, between the Turkish Football Federation and the mobile phone operator Turkcell. The 2020–21 season was dedicated to healthcare Workers and was officially named(Turkish: Sağlık Çalışanları Sezonu).

Due to ongoing COVID-19 pandemic in Turkey, the regular season, which is used to start in the Fall and to conclude in the next year's Spring, was postponed to Spring with changed competition format. The 2020–21 season starts on 17 April and ends on 5 May. The number of participating teams increased to 16, including all the 12 teams from the 2019-20 First League season and additional 4 top teams promoted from the 2019-20 Second League season. The 16 teams are divided in four groups of four teams. Each of the four promoted Second-League teams are assigned to one group. Each team in a group plays three matches in total. The first two top teams of each group are qualified for quarterfinals in a single-elimination tournament. The team winning the final match will represent Turkey at the 2021–22 UEFA Women's Champions League .

== Teams ==
=== Team changes ===
| Relegated from 2019–20 First League | Promoted from 2019–20 Second League |
|---|---|
| None | 1207 Antalya Spor; Dudullu Spor; İlkadım Belediyesi; Kayseri Gençler Birliği |

Location of teams in the 2020–21 season of Turkcell Women's Football League

Season 2019–20
| Team | Hometown | Ground | Capacity | 2019–20 finish |
|---|---|---|---|---|
| 1207 Antalya Spor | Antalya | Zeytinköy Stadium's Field #2. | | 3rd (Second League) |
| Adana İdmanyurduspor | Adana | Gençlik Stadium | 2,000 | 11th |
| ALG Spor | Gaziantep | Batur Stadium | | 1st |
| Amed Sportif Faaliyetler | Diyarbakır | Talaytepe Sports Facility | | 10th |
| Ataşehir Belediyespor | Istanbul | Yeni Sahra Stadium | 700 | 4th |
| Beşiktaş J.K. | Istanbul | İsmet İnönü Stadium | 800 | 2nd |
| Dudullu Spor | Istanbul | Dudullu Stadium | | 2nd (Second League) |
| Fatih Vatan Spor | Istanbul | Fatih Mimar Sinan Stadium | 800 | 5th |
| Fomget Gençlik ve Spor | Ankara | Batıkent Stadium | | 12th |
| Hakkarigücü Spor | Hakkari | Merzan City Football Field | | 6th |
| İlkadım Belediyesi | Samsun | İlkadım Derebahçe Stadıum | | 1st (Second League) |
| Kdz. Ereğlispor | Karadeniz Ereğli | Beyçayir Football Field | | 7th |
| Kayseri Gençler Birliği | Kayseri | Argıncık Stadium, Field No. 2 | | 6th (Second League) |
| Kireçburnu Spor | Istanbul | Çayırbaşı Stadium | 5,000 | 8th |
| Kocaeli Bayan FK | İzmit | Mehmet Ali Kağıtçı Stadium | | 9th |
| Konak Belediyespor | İzmir | Atatürk Stadyum 1 no'lu Yan Saha | | 3rd |

== Qualifying stage ==
All matches of the four groups are played at the Emirhan Sport Complex in Manavgat district of Antalya Province between 17 and 24 April 2021.

=== Group A ===
| Pos | Team | Pld | W | D | L | GF | GA | GD | Pts | Qualification | BJK | FAT | ILK | AMD |
|---|---|---|---|---|---|---|---|---|---|---|---|---|---|---|
| 1 | Beşiktaş | 3 | 3 | 0 | 0 | 16 | 1 | +15 | 9 | Quarterfinals | — | 1–0 | 8–1 | 7–0 |
| 2 | Fatih Vatan | 3 | 2 | 0 | 1 | 11 | 1 | +10 | 6 | Quarterfinals | | — | 3–0 | 8–0 |
| 3 | İlkadım | 3 | 1 | 0 | 2 | 4 | 13 | −9 | 3 | | | | — | |
| 4 | Amed | 3 | 0 | 0 | 3 | 2 | 18 | −16 | 0 | | | | 2–3 | — |

=== Group B ===
| Pos | Team | Pld | W | D | L | GF | GA | GD | Pts | Qualification | ADA | ATA | ANT | HAK |
|---|---|---|---|---|---|---|---|---|---|---|---|---|---|---|
| 1 | Adana | 3 | 2 | 1 | 0 | 4 | 2 | +2 | 7 | Quarterfinals | — | | 1–0 | |
| 2 | Ataşehir | 3 | 1 | 2 | 0 | 7 | 2 | +5 | 5 | Quarterfinals | 1–1 | — | 1–1 | 5–0 |
| 3 | 1207 Antalya | 3 | 0 | 2 | 1 | 2 | 3 | −1 | 2 | | | | — | |
| 4 | Hakkari | 3 | 0 | 1 | 2 | 2 | 8 | −6 | 1 | | 1–2 | | 1–1 | — |

=== Group C ===
| Pos | Team | Pld | W | D | L | GF | GA | GD | Pts | Qualification | ALG | FOM | KIR | DUD |
|---|---|---|---|---|---|---|---|---|---|---|---|---|---|---|
| 1 | ALG | 3 | 3 | 0 | 0 | 15 | 0 | +15 | 9 | Quarterfinals | — | 1–0 | 7–0 | 7–0 |
| 2 | Fomget | 3 | 2 | 0 | 1 | 9 | 4 | +5 | 6 | Quarterfinals | | — | | 3–0 |
| 3 | Kireçburnu | 3 | 1 | 0 | 2 | 6 | 15 | −9 | 3 | | | 3–6 | — | 3–2 |
| 4 | Dudullu | 3 | 0 | 0 | 3 | 2 | 13 | −11 | 0 | | | | | — |

=== Group D ===
| Pos | Team | Pld | W | D | L | GF | GA | GD | Pts | Qualification | IKON | KAY | KDZ | KOC |
|---|---|---|---|---|---|---|---|---|---|---|---|---|---|---|
| 1 | Konak | 3 | 2 | 1 | 0 | 3 | 0 | +3 | 7 | Quarterfinals | — | 0–0 | 1–0 | 2–0 |
| 2 | Kayseri | 3 | 1 | 2 | 0 | 3 | 2 | +1 | 5 | Quarterfinals | | — | | |
| 3 | Kdz. Ereğli | 3 | 1 | 0 | 2 | 2 | 3 | −1 | 3 | | | 0–1 | — | 2–1 |
| 4 | Kocaeli | 3 | 0 | 1 | 2 | 3 | 6 | −3 | 1 | | | 2–2 | | — |

== Knockout stage ==
Quarterfinals
A1 | Beşiktaş | 3
B2 | Ataşehir | 1
C1 | ALG | 2
D2 | Kayseri | 0
B1 | Adana | 1
C2 | Fomget | 2
D1 | Konak | 1 (3)
A2 | Fatih Vatan | 1 (4)

Semifinals
Beşiktaş (pen.) | 0 (2)
ALG | 0 (1)
Fomget | 0
Fatih Vatan | 1

Finals
Beşiktaş | 2
Fatih Vatan | 0
Third place
ALG | 3
Fomget | 0

== Honours ==
The Turkish Football Federation awarded following sportspeople for the league season following the final match.

- Top goalscorer: Zelal Baturay of Fatih Vatan Spor (7 goals),
- Best goalkeeper: Fatma Şahin of Beşiktaş J.K.,
- Most valuable player: Cansu Nur Kaya of Fatih Vatan Spor,
- Best manager: Efe Mehmet Aydın of Fatih Vatan Spor.

Additionally, the referees of the final matches, Melis Özçiğdem, Deybet Gök, Betül Nur Yılmaz, Cansu Tiryaki and Özlem Yapaklar as well as the organizers Dr. Esin Nur Taşdemir and Dr. İsmail Başöz were honored with a plaque.

== Top goalscorers ==
As of 5 May 2021.

| Rank | Player | Team | GS | Pld | AG |
|---|---|---|---|---|---|
| 1 | (Turkey) Zelal Baturay | Fatih Vatan Spor | 7 | 6 | 1.17 |
| 2 | (Mali) Bassira Touré | ALG Spor | 6 | 5 | 1.20 |
| 3 | (Turkey) Elanur Laçin | Kireçburnu Spor | 4 | 3 | 1.33 |
| 3 | (Turkey) Ebru Topçu | ALG Spor | 4 | 6 | 0.67 |

== Hat-tricks and more ==
| Player | Scored | For | Against | Result | Date |
|---|---|---|---|---|---|
| (Turkey) Elanur Laçin | 3 | Kireçburnu Spor | Dudullu Spor | 3-2 | 21 April 2021 |
| (Mali) Bassira Touré | 4 | ALG Spor | Kireçburnu Spor | 7-0 | 24 April 2021 |
