= Anastasia Pozdeeva =

Russian footballer (born 1993)

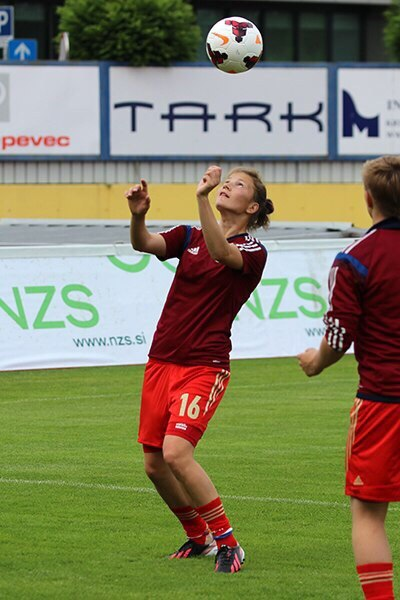

Personal information
- Full name: Anastasia Pozdeeva
- Date of birth: 12 June 1993 (age 33)
- Place of birth: Samara, Russia
- Height: 1.71 m (5 ft 7 in)
- Position: Midfielder

Team information
- Current team: Zenit

Senior career*
Years	Team	Apps	(Gls)
2009–2010	CSK VVS Samara	28	(18)
2011	Krylia Sovetov	18	(14)
2012–2018	Zvezda 2005 Perm	91	(8)
2019-2021	CSKA Moscow	54	(8)
2022-	Zenit	13	(0)

International career^{‡}
2009	Russia U-17	16	(5)
2010–2012	Russia U-19	37	(4)
2013–	Russia	5	(0)
- * Club domestic league appearances and goals as of 19:25, 13 August 2022 (UTC) ‡ National team caps and goals as of 14 July 2013

Anastasia Pozdeeva (born 12 June 1993) is a Russian footballer. She plays as a midfielder for Zenit and the Russia national team.

== Club career ==
She played for Zvezda 2005 Perm since 2012. She won her first title at her debutant season by winning the 2013 edition of the Russian Women's Cup.

== International career ==
She took part in 2011 UEFA Women's U-19 Championship. She was called up to be part of the national team for the UEFA Women's Euro 2013.

== Personal life ==
Pozdeeva was born in Samara.

== Honours ==
Zvezda 2005 Perm

Winner

- Russian Women's Cup: 2013

=== Meaningful goals ===
Data	Match	Result	Status	Goal
14.04.2009	Russia U-17-Hungary U-17	3-2	UEFA Women's Under-17 Championship	30'
24.10.2009	Russia U-17-Armenia U-17	19-0	UEFA Women's Under-17 Championship	35', 81'
14.03.2010	Russia U-19-Estonia U-19	4–0	Friendly match	28'
16.09.2010	Russia U-19-Republic of Ireland U-19	3–0	UEFA Women's Under-19 Championship	4'
06.03.2011	Russia U-19-Estonia U-19	3–0	Friendly match	23'
01.07.2013	Russia-Wales U-19	6–0	Friendly match	90+3'
16.10.2014	Zvezda 2005 Perm (Russia) -Stjarnan Women (Iceland)	3–1	UEFA Women's Champions League	64'
