= Anastasiya Berezina =

Russian footballer (1997–2019)

Anastasia Berezina

Personal information
- Date of birth: 29 September 1997
- Place of birth: Moscow
- Date of death: 4 August 2019 (aged 21)

Senior career*
Years	Team	Apps	(Gls)
2017	Chertanovo		

International career
2013–2014	Russia U19		
- * Club domestic league appearances and goals

Anastasia Igorevna Berezina (29 September 1997 – 4 August 2019) was a Russian football player. She was a midfielder who played for the Chertanovo football club and the Russian National under 19 team. She died of cardiac arrest in her sleep at the age of 21.

== Career ==
Berezina was born in Moscow in 1997. She joined the Chertanovo football club and trained at the club for more than ten years, Her first coach was Natalya Titkova.

She played in the 2015 UEFA Women's Under-19 Championship qualification and scored four goals.

Berezina made her debut for the Chertanova main team in the Russian Premier League on 18 April 2017 in a match against CSKA. She was brought on to replace Alsu Abdullina in the 71st minute. She was included in the starting lineup shortly afterwards on 30 April 2017 when Chertanova were playing the Ryazan-Airborne Forces club. In total, she played six matches for Chertanovo in the major league, all in the first half of the 2017 season. With her club, she became the finalist of the Russian Cup in 2017, scored a goal in the 1/8 final game against the Yaroslavl Youth Sports School-13 (18: 0), but did not play in the final match.

She played for the junior and youth national teams of Russia, spent 22 matches in all and scored 9 goals. She twice did a double in the matches of the qualifying tournament of the European Youth Championship, against Belarus and Macedonia. Her team was the winner of the 2014 Kuban Spring tournament.

She died on 4 August 2019, at the age of 22, from cardiac arrest in her sleep.
