= Minareliçavuş Spor Tesisleri =

Sports facility

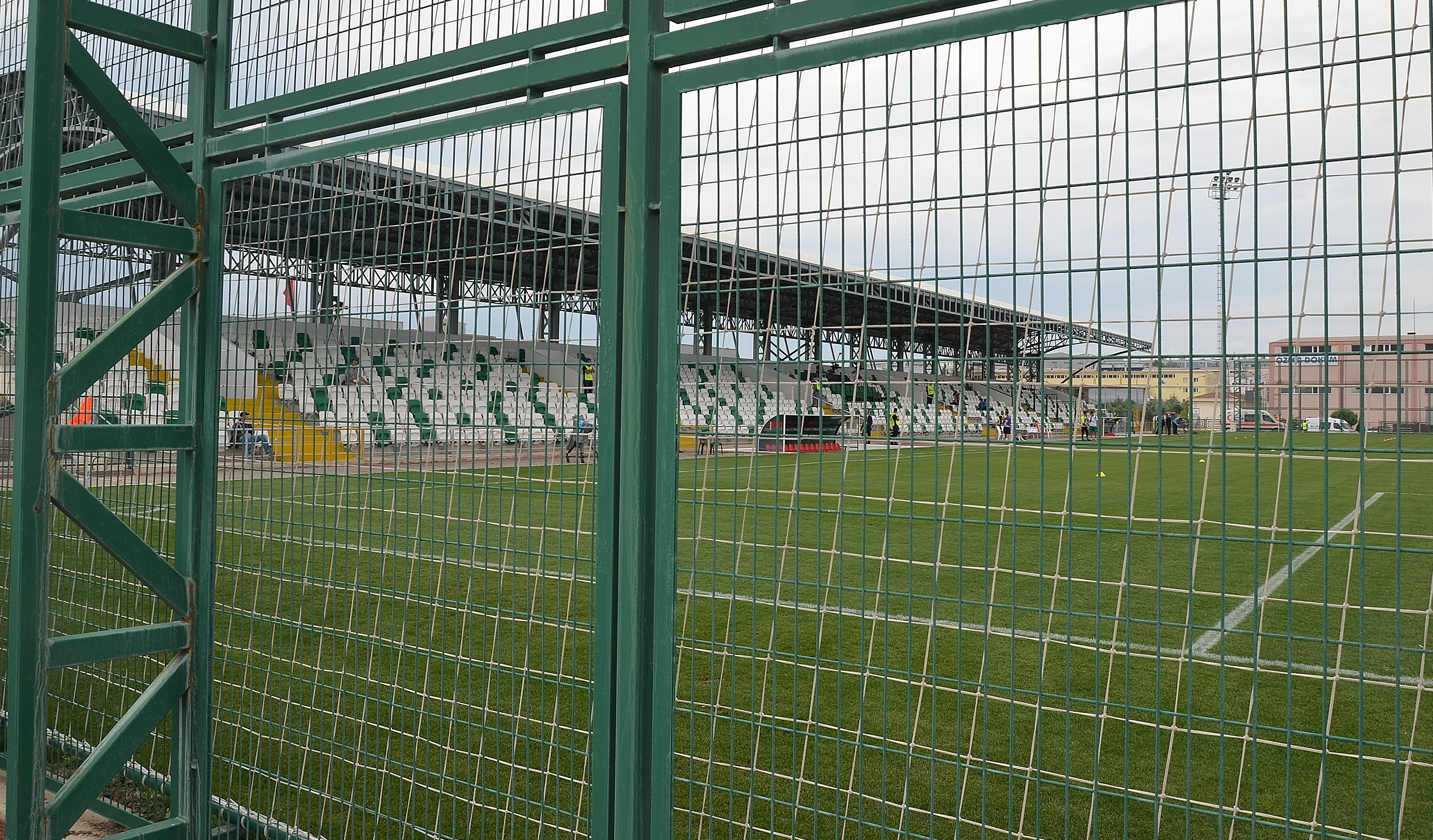
- Minareli Çavuş Stadium at Nilüfer, Bursa in Turkey.
- Interactive map of Minareliçavuş Spor Tesisleri
- Location: Nilüfer, Bursa, Turkey
- Coordinates: 40.23396°N 28.94211°E
- Owner: Bursa Metropolitan Municipality
- Capacity: 1,000
- Surface: Grass and artificial turf

Construction
- Opened: January 4, 2014; 12 years ago
- Cost: almost ₺4 million

Tenant
- Yeşil Bursa AŞ

Minareliçavuş Spor Tesisleri, opened in 2014, is a sports facility for football matches in Bursa, Turkey.

Situated inside the Nilüfer Industrial Zone (Turkish: Nilüfer Organize Sanayi Bölgesi, NOSAB) at Minareliçavuş neighborhood of Nilüfer district in Bursa, the sports facility was built by Bursa Metropolitan Municipality and opened on January 4, 2014. It consists of two football fields with dimensions of 72 m × 105 m (236 ft × 344 ft) in FIFA standards, one of with grass ground and the other with artificial turf. It hosts matches of amateur clubs in addition to regular league matches. The stadium has a spectator capacity of 1,000. The construction cost almost ₺4 million.

The facility is home to Yeşil Bursa AŞ, formerly Oyak Renault G.S.D., which play in the TFF Third League.

== Notable events ==
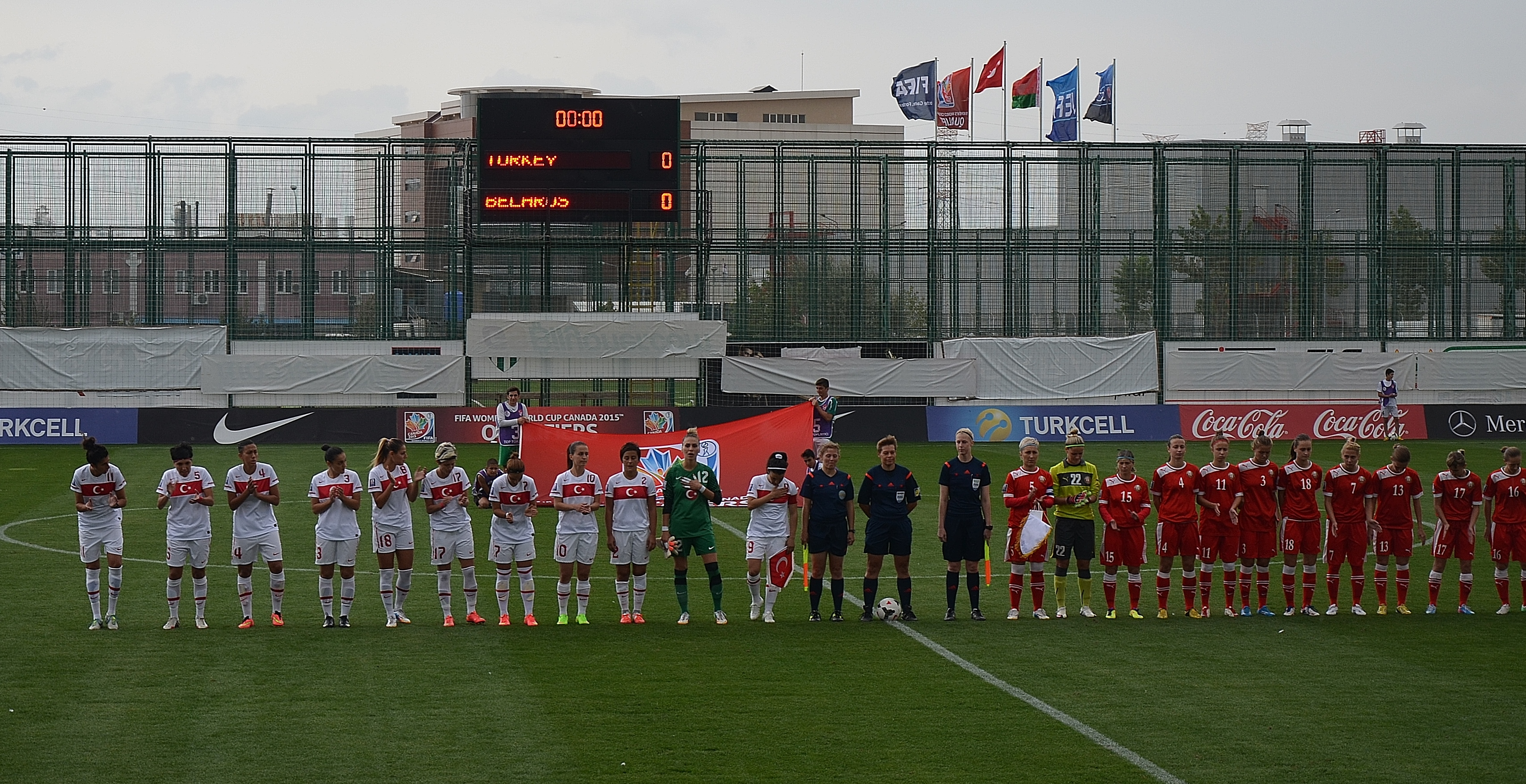
2015 FIFA Women's World Cup qualification – UEFA Group 6 match Turkey vs Belarus on September 17, 2014

On September 17, 2014, Turkey women's national football team played their 2015 FIFA Women's World Cup qualification – UEFA Group 6 match against Belarus at this venue.

The stadium hosted three of the six 2015 UEFA Women's Under-19 Championship qualification Group 4 matches between September 13–18, 2014.

== See also ==
- List of football stadiums in Turkey
