= Cansu Nur Kaya =

Turkish footballer (born 2000)

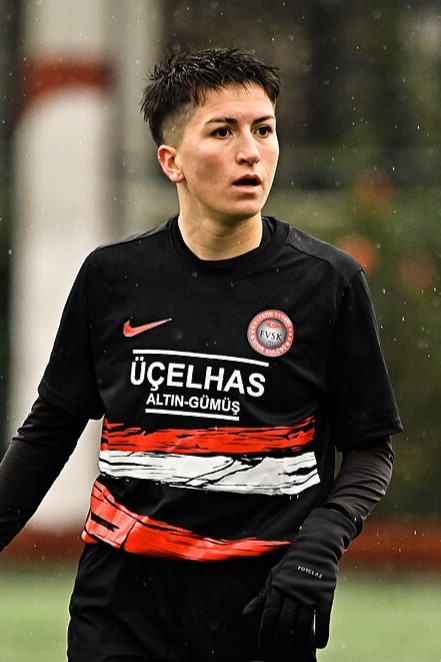
- Cansu Nur Kaya of Fatih Vatan Spor in the 2023-24 Turkish Women's Football Super League

Personal information
- Date of birth: 28 February 2000 (age 26)
- Place of birth: Kartal, Istanbul, Turkey
- Position: Defender

Team information
- Current team: Fatih Vatan
- Number: 20

Senior career*
Years	Team	Apps	(Gls)
2016–2020	Pendik Çamlik	58	(38)
2021	Fatih Vatan	5	(0)
2021–2022	Beşiktaş	14	(0)
2022–	Fatih Vatan	73	(7)

International career^{‡}
2017	Turkey U-17	2	(1)
2017–2019	Turkey U-19	20	(0)
2020–	Turkey	8	(0)
- * Club domestic league appearances and goals as of 15 October 2025 ‡ National team caps and goals as of 17 July 2023

Cansu Nur Kaya (born 28 February 2000) is a Turkish women's football defender, who plays in the Turkish Super League for Fatih Vatan Spor with jersey number 20. She played for the Turkey girls' U-17 and women's U1-19 teams before she became a member of the Turkey women's national team.

== Club career ==
Cansu Nur Kaya obtained her license from Pendik Çamlık Spor on 30 April 2015. She debuted in the 2016–17 Third League. She played four seasons in the Third League for Pendik Çamlık Spor netting 38 goals in 58 öatches. In the 2020-21First League season, she transferred to Fatih Vatan Spor. Her team became runner-up losing to Beşiktaş J.K. in the play-off final. She was honored the award of Most Valuable Player of the league.

Kaya transferred to Beşiktaş J.K. end June 2021, and played in one match of the 2021–22 UEFA Women's Champions League qualifying rounds. For the 2022–23 Sıper League season, she returned to her former club Fatih Vatan Spor.

== International career ==
In 2017, Kaya was admitted to the Turkey women's national U-17 team, and capped in two games of the 2017 UEFA Development Tournament.

The same year, she joined the Turkey women's U-19 team. She participated at all three matches of the 2018 UEFA Women's U-19 Championship qualification – Group 10 and all three games of the Elite round. She appeared also in all three matches of 2019 UEFA Women's U-19 Championship qualification – Group 2. and all three matches of the Elite round. She capped in total 20 times.

In 2020, she became a member of the Turkey women's national team. She played her first official international match for the senior team at the UEFA Women's Euro 2022 qualifying Group A against Estonia on 27 November 2020.

== Career statistics ==
As of match played on 6 October 2024.

Club	Season	League			Continental		National		Total	
Club	Season	Division	Apps	Goals	Apps	Goals	Apps	Goals	Apps	Goals
Pendik Çamlık	2016–2017	Third League	23	17	–	–	–	-	23	17
Pendik Çamlık	2017–2018	Third League	11	5	–	–	12	1	23	6
Pendik Çamlık	2018–2019	Third League	11	9	–	–	10		21	9
Pendik Çamlık	2019–2020	Third League	13	7	–	–	1		14	7
Pendik Çamlık	Tota		58	38	–	–	23	1	81	39
Fatih Vatan	202–21	First League	5	0	–	–	1	0	6	0
Beşiktaş	2021–22	Super League	14	0	1	0	2	0	17	0
Fatih Vatan	2022–23	Super League	18	3	0	0	4	0	22	3
Fatih Vatan	2023–24	Super League	27	2	0	0	0	0	27	2
Fatih Vatan	2024–25	Super League	5	0	0	0	0	0	5	0
Fatih Vatan	Total		50	5	0	0	4	0	54	5
Career total			127	43	1	0	30	1	158	44

== Honours ==
=== Club ===
Turkish Women's First League

Fatih Vatan Spor
Runners-up (1): 2020–21

=== Individual ===
- Most Valuable Player: 2020–21 with Fatih Vatan Spor
