= Anna Belomyttseva =

Russian footballer (born 1996)

Anna Ivanovna Belomyttseva
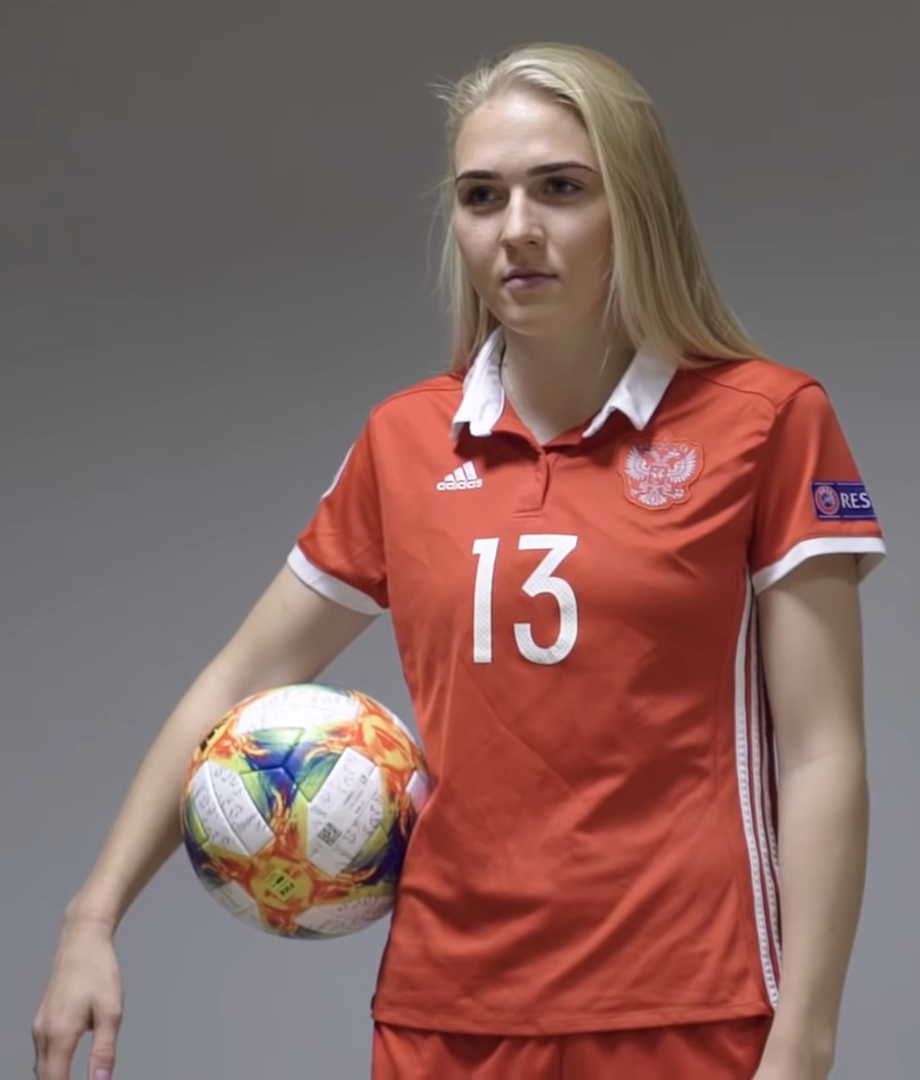
- Belomyttseva in 2019

Personal information
- Full name: Anna Ivanovna Belomyttseva
- Date of birth: 24 November 1996 (age 29)
- Place of birth: Troitskoye, Russia
- Height: 1.74 m (5 ft 9 in)
- Position: Defender

Team information
- Current team: Lokomotiv Moscow
- Number: 15

Senior career*
Years	Team	Apps	(Gls)
2013–2018	Ryazan	47	(6)
2019-	Lokomotiv Moscow	56	(11)

International career
2011–2013	Russia U17	9	(3)
2013–2015	Russia U19	11	(3)
2016–	Russia	16	(1)
- * Club domestic league appearances and goals as of 2:25, 28 June 2019 (UTC)

Anna Belomyttseva (born November 24, 1996) is a Russian footballer who plays as a defender for Lokomotiv Moscow at the Russian Women's Football Championship.

Belomyttseva represented Russia at several youth levels, including the U17 and U19 national teams. She debuted with the Russian senior national team in 2016 and was in the 23-players squad that represented Russia at the UEFA Women's Euro 2017, although she didn't play any of the team's matches in the competition. After the tournament, she became an important part of the Russian team, featuring in several matches for the team.

== International goals ==
No.	Date	Venue	Opponent	Score	Result	Competition
1.	28 February 2018	Albufeira Municipal Stadium, Albufeira, Portugal	South Korea	1–0	1–3	2018 Algarve Cup
2.	1 December 2020	Arslan Zeki Demirci Sports Complex, Manavgat, Turkey	Turkey	1–0	2–1	UEFA Women's Euro 2022 qualifying
3.	21 September 2021	Sportivnyy Gorodok, Moscow, Russia	Montenegro	5–0	5–0	2023 FIFA Women's World Cup qualification
4.	21 October 2021	Arena Khimki, Khimki, Russia	Malta	3–0	3–0	2023 FIFA Women's World Cup qualification
5.	27 February 2024	Belek Football Training Camp, Antalya, Turkey	Botswana	1–0	4–0	Friendly
6.	27 February 2024	Belek Football Training Camp, Antalya, Turkey	Botswana	4–0	4–0	Friendly
7.	4 April 2024	Sueno Hotels Deluxe Belek, Serik, Turkey	Ecuador	2–0	4–0	Friendly
8.	8 April 2024	Sueno Hotels Deluxe Belek, Serik, Turkey	Ecuador	1–1	3–2	Friendly
