= Azize Erdoğan =

Turkish footballer (born 1996)

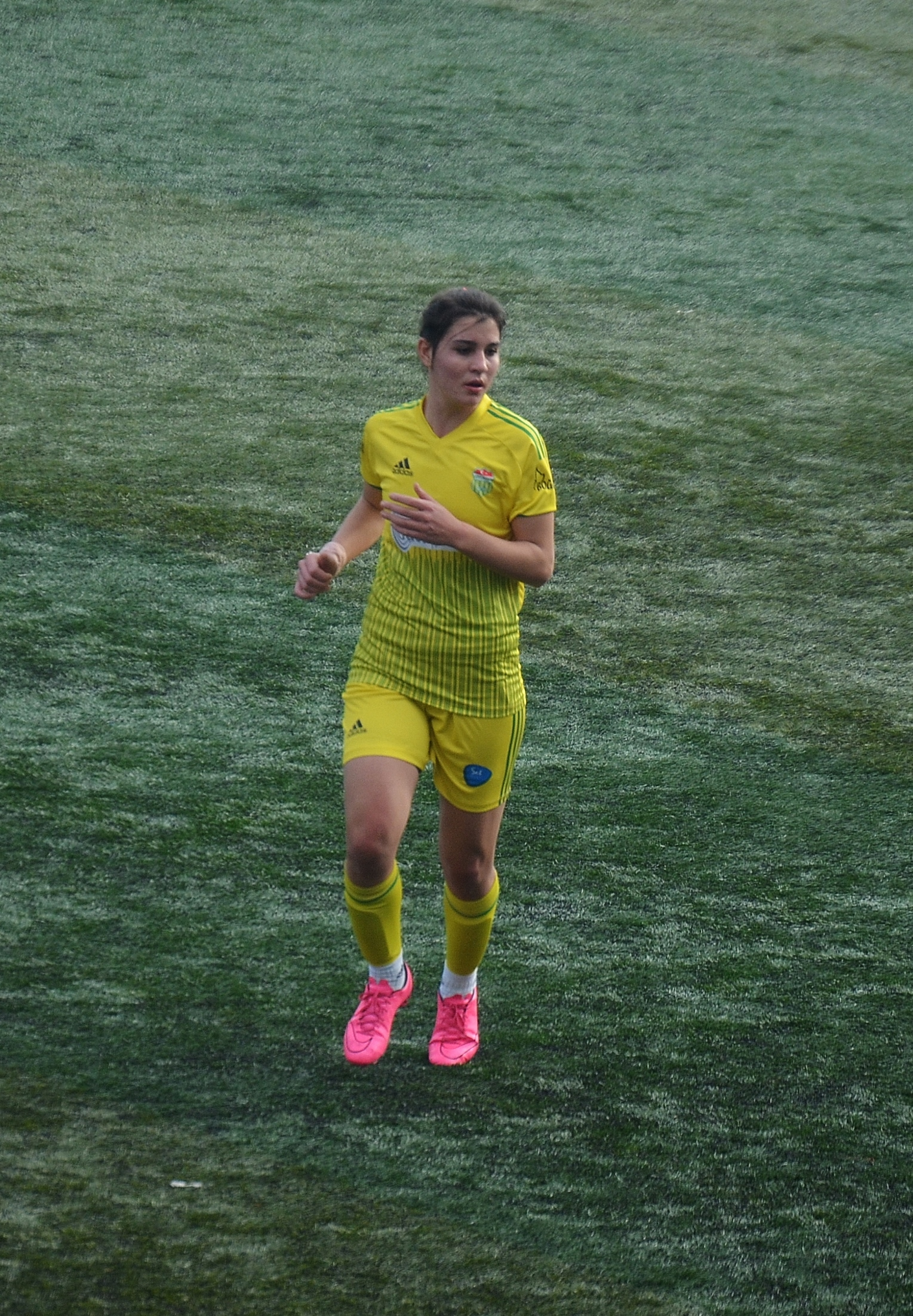
- Azize Erdoğan for Kireçburnu Spor in the 2015–16 season

Personal information
- Date of birth: August 5, 1996 (age 30)
- Place of birth: Aydın, Turkey
- Position: Attacking midfielder

Team information
- Current team: Ataşehir Belediyespor
- Number: 77

Senior career*
Years	Team	Apps	(Gls)
2010–2014	7 Eylül Gençlik Spor	37	(47)
2014–2016	Kireçburnu Spor	43	(45)
2017–	Ataşehir Belediyespor	7	(0)
Total		87	(92)

International career^{‡}
2013–2015	Turkey U-19	12	(6)
- * Club domestic league appearances and goals as of May 14, 2017 ‡ National team caps and goals as of April 11, 2015

Azize Erdoğan (born August 5, 1996) is a Turkish women's football attacking midfielder, who last played in the Women's First League for Ataşehir Belediuespor with jersey number 77. She is a member of the Turkey Women's National U-19 Team.

== Early years ==
Azize Erdoğan was born in the western Turkish city of Aydın on August 5, 1996. She graduated from İncirliova Sports High School in her hometown, and began studying at Marmara University in Istanbul.

== Playing career ==
=== Club ===
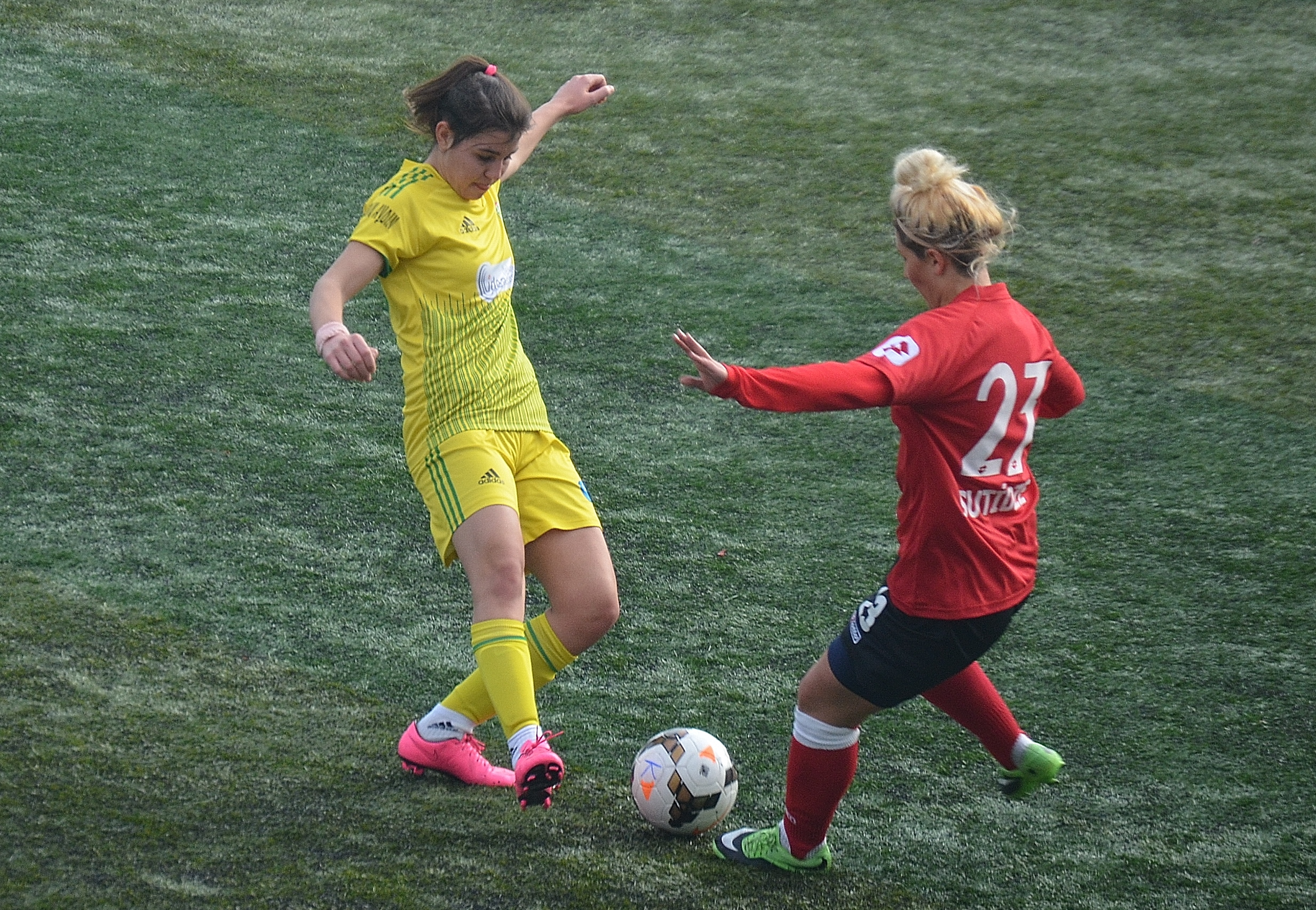
Azize Erdoğan (yellow/green) played in the home match of the 2015–16 season against Konak Belediyespor.

Azize Erdoğan received her license for her hometown club 7 Eylül Gençlik Spor in Aydın on June 16, 2009. She began playing in the 2010–11 season of the Women's Regional League. After one season, the team was promoted to the Women's Second League. She continued to appear until the end of the 2013–14 season. She scored 47 goals in 37 games played for 7 Eylül Gençlik Spor.

By August 2014, Erdoğan signed a contract with the Istanbul-based club Kireçburnu Spor, who also competed in the Women's Second League. Her new team finished the 2014–15 season as runners-up, and were promoted to the Women's First League. With 35 goals scored, she was the top scorer of the Women's Second League in the 2014–15 season, followed by Hatice Yaşar, who netted 22 goals in total. In the second half of the 2016–17 First League Season, Erdoğan transferred to Ataşehir Belediyespor. At the end of the season, she retired.

=== International ===
Azize Erdoğan debuted in the Turkey Women's National U-19 Team in the Kuban Spring Tournament appearing in the match against Slovakia on March 6, 2013. She took part in the 2015 UEFA Women's Under-19 Championship Qualification Group 4 and Elite round matches.

== Career statistics ==
As of match played May 14, 2017.

Club	Season	League			Continental		National		Total	
Club	Season	Division	Apps	Goals	Apps	Goals	Apps	Goals	Apps	Goals
7 Eylül Gençlik Spor	2010–11	Regöonal League	9	11	–	–	–	–	9	11
7 Eylül Gençlik Spor	2011–12	Second League	6	9	–	–	–	–	6	9
7 Eylül Gençlik Spor	2012–13	Second League	10	8	–	–	2	0	12	8
7 Eylül Gençlik Spor	2013–14	Second League	12	19	–	–	0	0	12	19
7 Eylül Gençlik Spor	Total		37	47	-	–	2	0	39	47
Kireçburnu Spor	2014–15	Second League	22	35	–	–	10	6	32	41
Kireçburnu Spor	2015–16	First League	15	9	–	–	0	0	15	9
Kireçburnu Spor	2016–17	First League	6	1	–	–	0	0	6	1
Kireçburnu Spor	Total		43	45	–	–	10	6	53	51
Ataşehir Belediyespor	2016–17	First League	7	0	–	–	0	0	7	0
Ataşehir Belediyespor	Total		7	0	–	–	0	0	7	0
Career total			87	92	–	–	12	6	99	98

== Honours ==
=== Club ===
Turkish Women's Second League

Kireçburnu Spor
Runners-up (1): 2014–15, promoted to the Women's First League.

Turkish Women's First League

Ataşehir Belediyespor
Third places (1): 2016–17

=== Individual ===
Turkish Women's Second League
Topscorer (35 goals) 2014–15 season with Kireçburnu Spor.
