= Zelal Baturay =

Turkish association football player

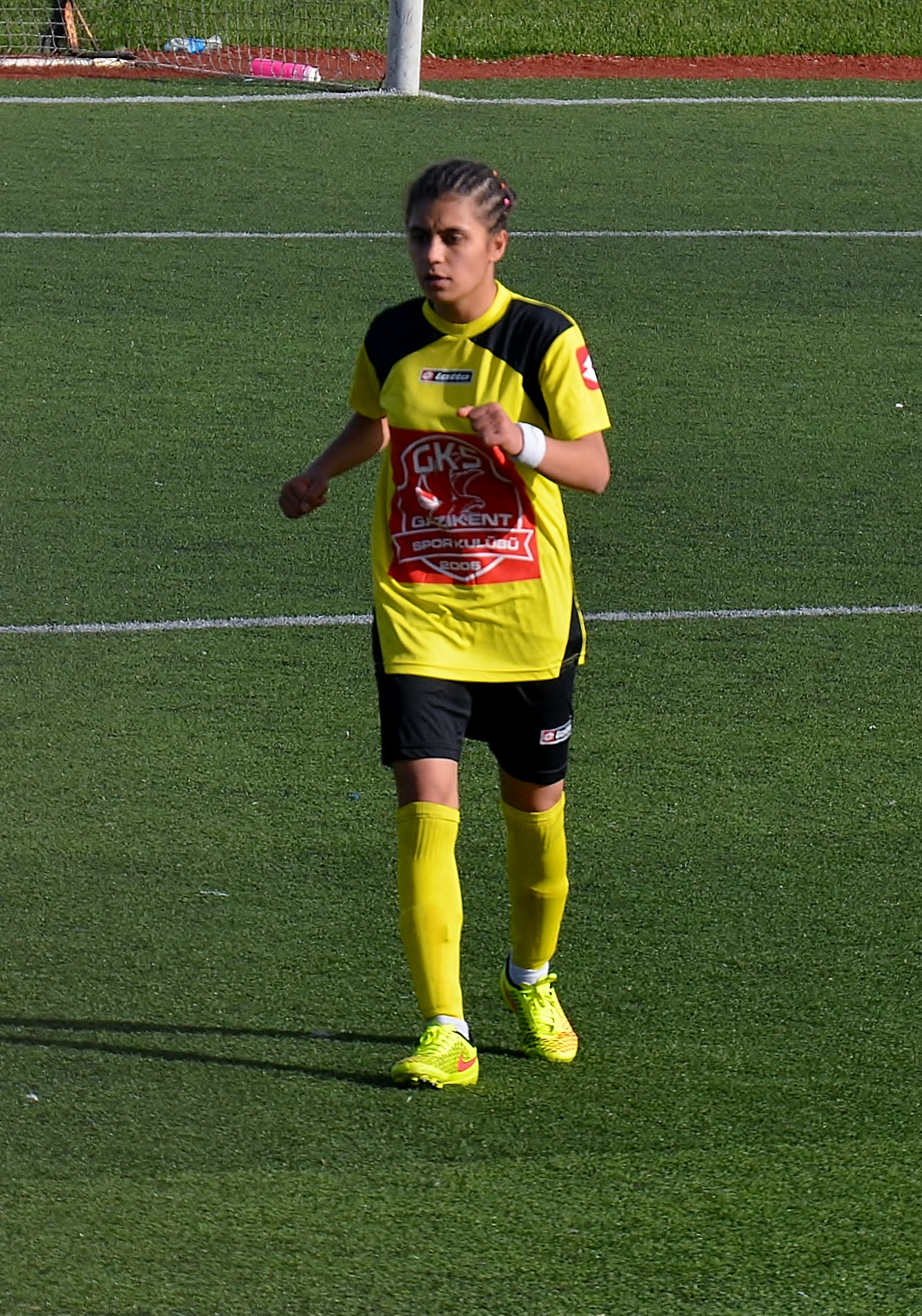
- Zelal Baturay for Gazikentspor in 2015

Personal information
- Date of birth: 7 July 1996 (age 30)
- Place of birth: Eğil, Diyarbakır Province, Turkey
- Position: Forward

Team information
- Current team: Fatih Vatan Spor
- Number: 21

Senior career*
| Years | Team | Apps | (Gls) |
| 2011–2014 | Diyarbakır B.B. Spor | 30 | (84) |
| 2014–2015 | Gazikentspor | 14 | (4) |
| 2015–2016 | Maraşgücü Spor | 10 | (28) |
| 2016–2020 | Amed S.K. | 57 | (26) |
| 2020– | Fatih Vatan Spor | 42 | (16) |

International career^{‡}
| 2013–2015 | Turkey U-19 | 13 | (4) |
- * Club domestic league appearances and goals as of 5 February 2023 ‡ National team caps and goals as of 19 March 2015

Zelal Baturay (born 7 July 1996) is a Turkish women's footballer who plays as a forward in the Women's Super League for Fatih Vatan Spor. She is a member of the Turkey women's national U-19 team.

== Club career ==
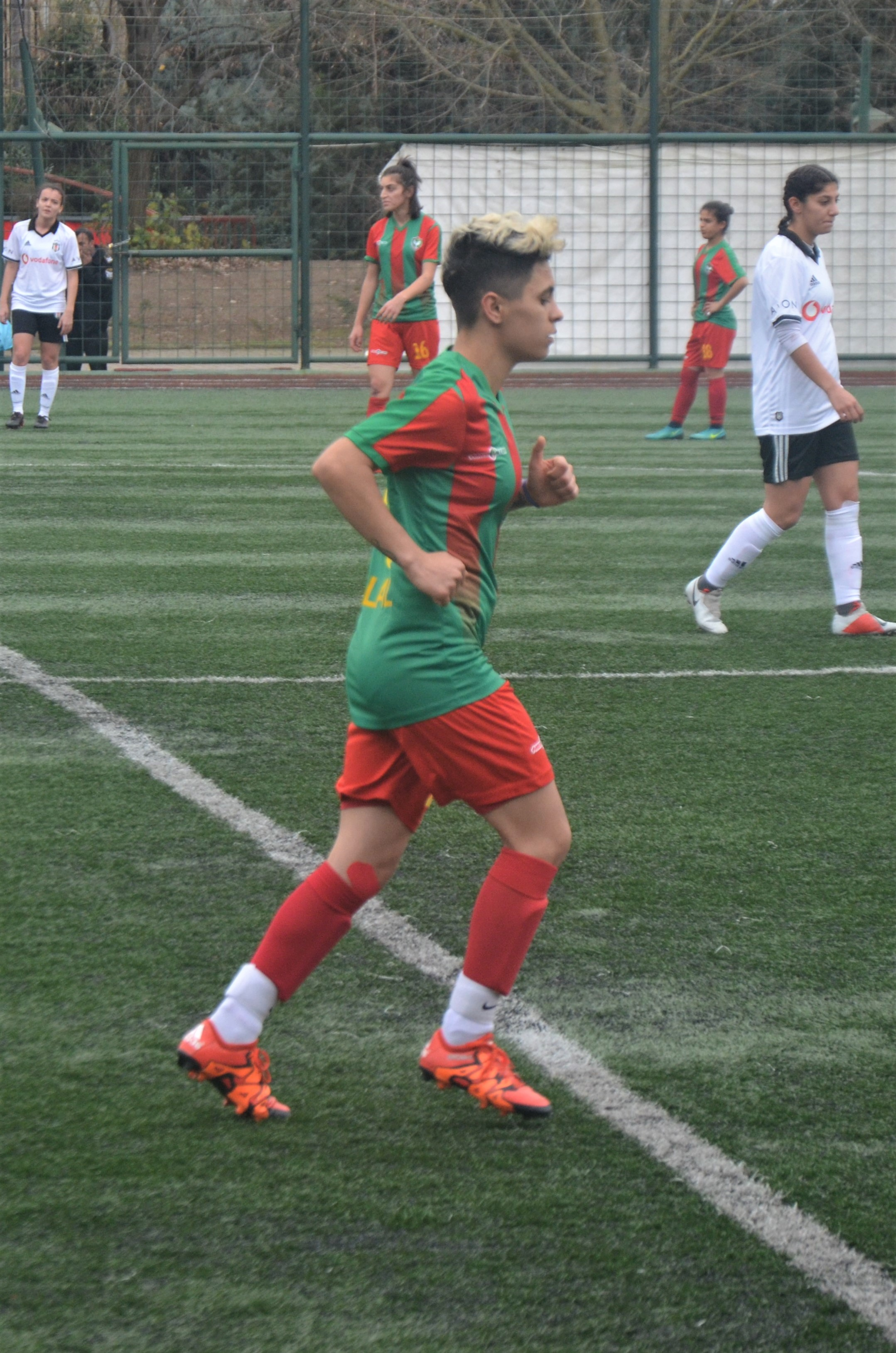
Zelal Baturay of Amed S.K. in the 2018–19 Women's First League

Zelal Baturay was discovered by Filiz Atay, the female manager of the women's football team Diyarbakır Büyükşehir Belediyespor, renamed later to Amed Sportif Faaliuetler, as she was playing football with boys on the street in Diyarbakır. Atay was hard put to persuade her parents for Baturay's football playing.

She obtained her license on 7 April 2011 for her hometown club Diyarbakır Büyükşehir Belediyespor. After playing three seasons in the Second League, at which she scored 84 goals in 30 games, she was transferred by Gazikentspor of Gaziantep in the 2014–15 season to play in the Women's First League.

In the 2012–13 season, Zelal Baturay became top scorer of the Second League's Division of Southeast Anatolia-Mediterranean Region with 33 goals in 10 matches.

After three seasons with her hometown club Diyabakır B.B. Spor in the Second League, she transferred to Gazikentspor of Gaziantep in the 2014–15 season, which was newly promoted to the First League. With her team's relegation in the 2015–16 season, she moved to the Third-League team Maraşgücü Spor in Kahramanmaraş. In the 2016–17 season, Baturay returned to her hometown to play for Amed S.K. in the Second League.

In the second half of the 2019–20 Women's First League season, Baturay moved to the Istanbul-based club Fatih Vatan Spor. In the 3030–21 season, her team became runner-up losing to Beşiktaş J.K. in the play-off final match. She was honored with award of Top Goalscorer of the season.

== International career ==
Baturay was called up to the Tırkey women's national U-19 team, and debuted in the friendly match against Azerbaijan on 26 November 2013. She took part at the 2015 UEFA Women's Under-19 Championship qualification – Group 4 matches, and scored one goal. Baturay capped 11 times and scored 4 goals so far for the national U-19 team.

International goals (Friendly matches not included)
| Date | Venue | Opponent | Competition | Result | Scored |
Turkey women's national U-19 football team
| August 1, 2014 | Zimbru Stadium, Chișinău, Moldova | Romania | 2014 UEFA Women's Under-19 Development Tournament | W 7–0 | 1 |
| August 30, 2014 | Zimbru Stadium, Chișinău, Moldova | Ukraine | 2014 UEFA Women's Under-19 Development Tournament | W 2–1 | 1 |
| September 18, 2014 | İnegöl İlçe Stadium, Bursa, Turkey | Kazakhstan | 2015 UEFA Women's Under-19 Championship qualification round – Group 4 | W 6–1 | 1 |

== Career statistics ==
As of 5 February 20232.

| Club | Season | League | | | Continental | | National | | Total | |
| Club | Season | Division | Apps | Goals | Apps | Goals | Apps | Goals | Apps | Goals |
|---|---|---|---|---|---|---|---|---|---|---|
| Diyarbakır B.B. Spor | 2011–12 | Second League | 8 | 15 | – | – | 0 | 0 | 8 | 15 |
| Diyarbakır B.B. Spor | 2012–13 | Second League | 10 | 33 | – | – | 0 | 0 | 10 | 33 |
| Diyarbakır B.B. Spor | 2013–14 | Second League | 12 | 36 | – | – | 6 | 1 | 18 | 37 |
| Diyarbakır B.B. Spor | Total | | 30 | 84 | – | – | 6 | 1 | 36 | 85 |
| Gazikentspor | 2014–15 | First League | 14 | 4 | – | – | 7 | 3 | 21 | 7 |
| Gazikentspor | Total | | 14 | 4 | – | – | 7 | 3 | 21 | 7 |
| Maraşgücü Spor | 2015–16 | Third League | 10 | 28 | – | – | 0 | 0 | 10 | 28 |
| Maraşgücü Spor | Total | | 10 | 28 | – | – | 0 | 0 | 10 | 28 |
| Amed S.K. | 2016–17 | Second League | 17 | 13 | – | – | 0 | 0 | 17 | 13 |
| Amed S.K. | 2017–18 | First League | 16 | 2 | – | – | 0 | 0 | 16 | 2 |
| Amed S.K. | 2018–19 | First League | 16 | 7 | – | – | 0 | 0 | 16 | 7 |
| Amed S.K. | 2019–20 | First League | 8 | 4 | – | – | 0 | 0 | 8 | 4 |
| Amed S.K. | Total | | 57 | 26 | – | – | 0 | 0 | 57 | 26 |
| Fatih Vatan Spor | 2019–20 | First League | 4 | 2 | – | – | 0 | 0 | 4 | 2 |
| Fatih Vatan Spor | 2020–21 | First League | 6 | 7 | – | – | 0 | 0 | 6 | 7 |
| Fatih Vatan Spor | 2021–22 | Super League | 21 | 9 | – | – | 0 | 0 | 21 | 9 |
| Fatih Vatan Spor | 2022–23 | Super League | 11 | 0 | – | – | 0 | 0 | 12 | 0 |
| Fatih Vatan Spor | Total | | 42 | 18 | – | – | 0 | 0 | 42 | 18 |
| Career total | | | 153 | 160 | – | – | 13 | 4 | 166 | 164 |

== Honours ==
=== Club ===
Turkish Women's First League

Fatih Vatan Spor
Runners-up (1): 2020–21

=== Individual ===
- Top goalscorer: 2020–21 with Fatih Vatan Spor
