= Julia Glaser =

Swiss association football player

Personal information
- Date of birth: 7 October 1997 (age 29)
- Place of birth: Basel, Switzerland
- Height: 1.73 m (5 ft 8 in)
- Position: Forward

Youth career
- 2006-2008: Stade Nyonnais
- 2008-2012: FV Lörrach
- 2012-2014: SC Freiburg

College career
Years	Team	Apps	(Gls)
2016-2018	Fresno State Bulldogs	39	(22)
2018-2020	Point Loma Sea Lions	37	(27)

Senior career*
Years	Team	Apps	(Gls)
2014-2016	Basel	35	(9)
2020-2021	Roma CF		
2021-2022	Lazio		
2023-2024	SC Freiburg II	20	(15)
2024-	VfB Stuttgart	36	(14)
- * Club domestic league appearances and goals as of 12 July 2026

Julia Glaser (born October 7, 1997) is a Swiss footballer who plays for VfB Stuttgart. She has previously played for Lazio and FC Basel.
