= Tamara Bojat =

Montenegrin footballer

Personal information
- Full name: Tamara Bojat
- Date of birth: 11 April 1997 (age 29)
- Place of birth: Montenegro, FR Yugoslavia
- Position: Forward

Team information
- Current team: SFK 2000
- Number: 9

Senior career*
Years	Team	Apps	(Gls)
- SFK 2000

International career^{‡}
- Montenegro
- * Club domestic league appearances and goals as of 19:45, 30 August 2019 (UTC) ‡ National team caps and goals as of 19:45, 30 August 2019 (UTC)

Tamara Bojat (Serbian Cyrillic: Тамара Бојат; born 11 April 1997) is a Montenegrin footballer who plays as a forward and has appeared for the Montenegro women's national team.

== Career ==
Bojat has been capped for the Montenegro national team, appearing for the team during the 2019 FIFA Women's World Cup qualifying cycle.
