= Samantha Kelly =

Northern Irish footballer

Personal information
- Date of birth: 1 August 1997 (age 29)
- Place of birth: Northern Ireland,
- Position: Midfielder

Team information
- Current team: Glentoran
- Number: 15

Senior career*
Years	Team	Apps	(Gls)
	Glentoran	0	(0)

International career^{‡}
	Northern Ireland	5	(0)
- * Club domestic league appearances and goals as of 20:01, 29 August 2019 (UTC) ‡ National team caps and goals as of 20:01, 29 August 2019 (UTC)

Samantha Kelly (born 1 August 1997) is a Northern Irish footballer who plays as a midfielder and has appeared for the Northern Ireland women's national team.

== Career ==
Kelly has been capped for the Northern Ireland national team, appearing for the team during the 2019 FIFA Women's World Cup qualifying cycle.
