= Betül Nur Yılmaz =

Turkish football referee and school teacher

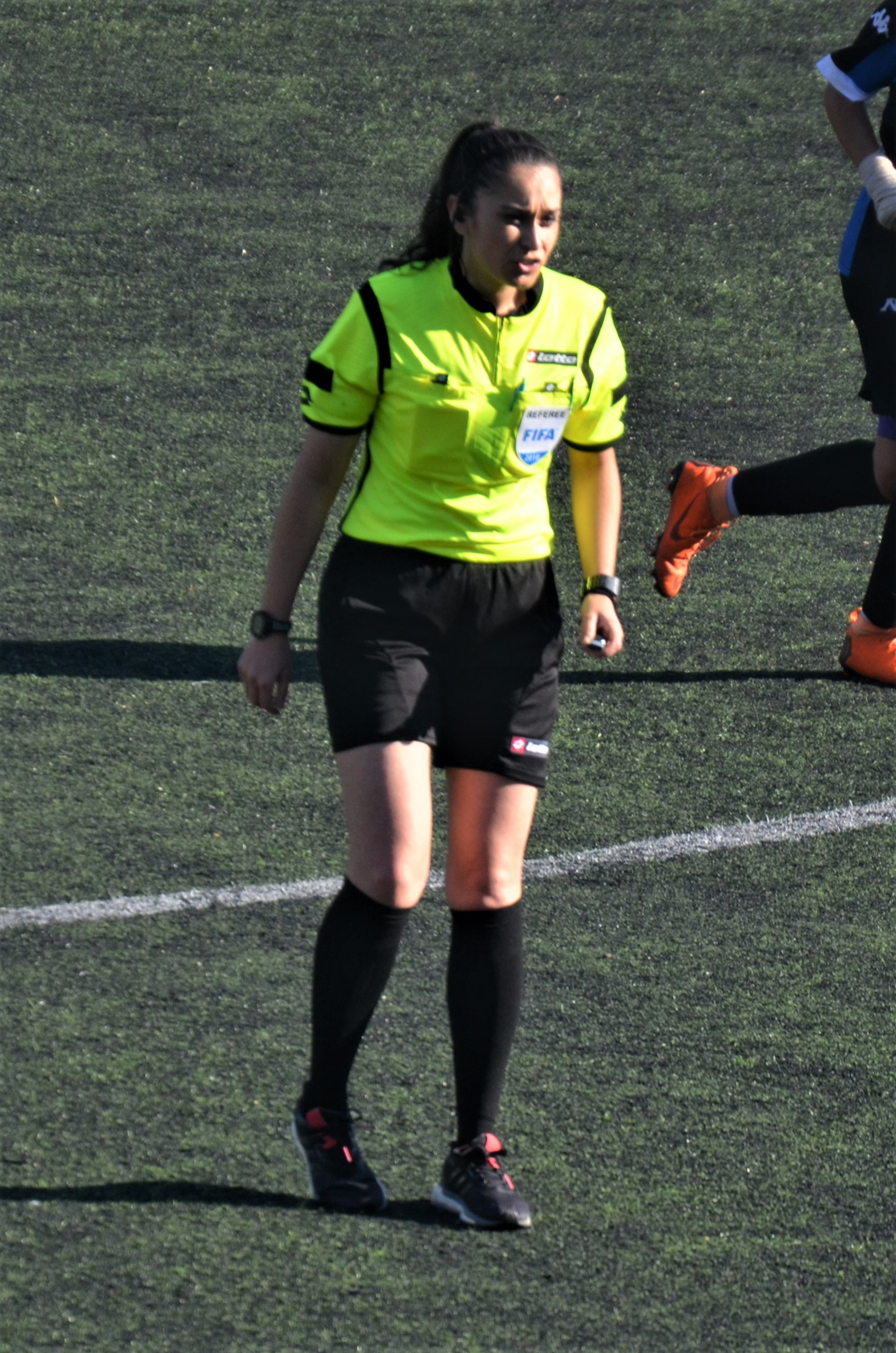
- Betül Nur Yılmaz (October 2018)
- Born: Turkey
- Other occupation: Teacher

Domestic
Years	League	Role
2009–2017	Amateur leagues for boys (U14, U15, U16, U17, U18)	assistant referee
2009–	Regional Amateur League	assistant referee
2012–2014	A2 Lig	assistant referee
2015–	Amateur leagues for boys (U19, U21)	assistant referee
2016–	Third League	assistant referee
2010–2017	Women's Regional League, Women's Third League	assistant referee, referee
2010–	Women's First League	assistant referee
2012–2015	Amateur leagues for boys (U15)	referee

International
Years	League	Role
2017–	UEFA Women's Championship; UEFA Women's Champions League; FIFA Women's World Cup; UEFA Women's Under-17 Championship	assistant referee

Betül Nur Yılmaz is a Turkish woman football referee and school teacher. She is a FIFA listed woman assistant referee.

Yılmaz started her officiating career as an assistant referee in the Amateur league for boys in 2009. She served at this position in almost all amateur league. From 2010 on, she takes the assistant referee role in Women's Third and First League matches. On 25 September 2012, she debuted in a match of U15 boys teams as referee.

Yılmaz was named FIFA listed woman assistant referee for 2016, and continued to bear this title in 2017. She debuted in this role at the 2017–18 UEFA Women's Champions League qualifying round match between ŽNK Osijek and ŽFK Istatov on 22 August 2017. She assisted her countrywoman referee Melis Özçiğdem at the 2019 FIFA Women's World Cup qualification – UEFA Group 4 match between Sweden and Hungary on 24 October 2017, and Group 7 match between Finland and Israel on 26 November 2017.

Yılmaz kept her FIFA-badge for 2018. She served as assistant referee alongside Turkish Melis Özçiğdem at the 2018–19 UEFA Women's Champions League - Round of 32 match between AFC Ajax and AC Sparta Praha on 12 September 2018. She was assistant to her countrywoman referee Neslihan Muratdağı in three matches at the 2019 UEFA Women's Under-17 Championship qualification – Group 8 matches in September 2018.
