= Emma Heikkilä =

Finnish association football player

Personal information
- Date of birth: 23 February 1996 (age 30)
- Place of birth: Tornio, Finland
- Height: 5 ft 5 in (1.65 m)
- Position: Forward

Emma Heikkilä (born 23 February 1996) is a Finnish footballer who played for Hibs.

== International career ==
Heikkilä has represented Finland whilst playing Futsal.
