= Michaela Moťovská =

Slovak footballer

Personal information
- Full name: Michaela Moťovská
- Date of birth: 24 September 1997 (age 29)
- Place of birth: Slovakia, Šaľa
- Height: 1.76 m (5 ft 9 in)
- Position: Defender

Youth career
- Matúškovo
- Slovan Duslo Šaľa
- 2013–2015: Sparta Prague

Senior career*
Years	Team	Apps	(Gls)
2015–2021	Sparta Prague	13	(1)
2017–2018	→ Slovan Liberec (loan)		
2019–2021	→ Slovan Liberec (loan)		
2021–2022	Slovan Liberec		

International career^{‡}
2015–2022	Slovakia	1	(0)
- * Club domestic league appearances and goals ‡ National team caps and goals as of 7 April 2017

Michaela Moťovská is a former Slovak football defender who last played for Slovan Liberec in the Czech Women's First League.

She was a member of the Slovakia national under-19 team, which she captained at the 2016 UEFA Women's Under-19 Championship. She made her debut for the Slovakia national team on 7 August 2015 in a match against United Arab Emirates.
