= Nora Lie Eghdami =

Norwegian footballer

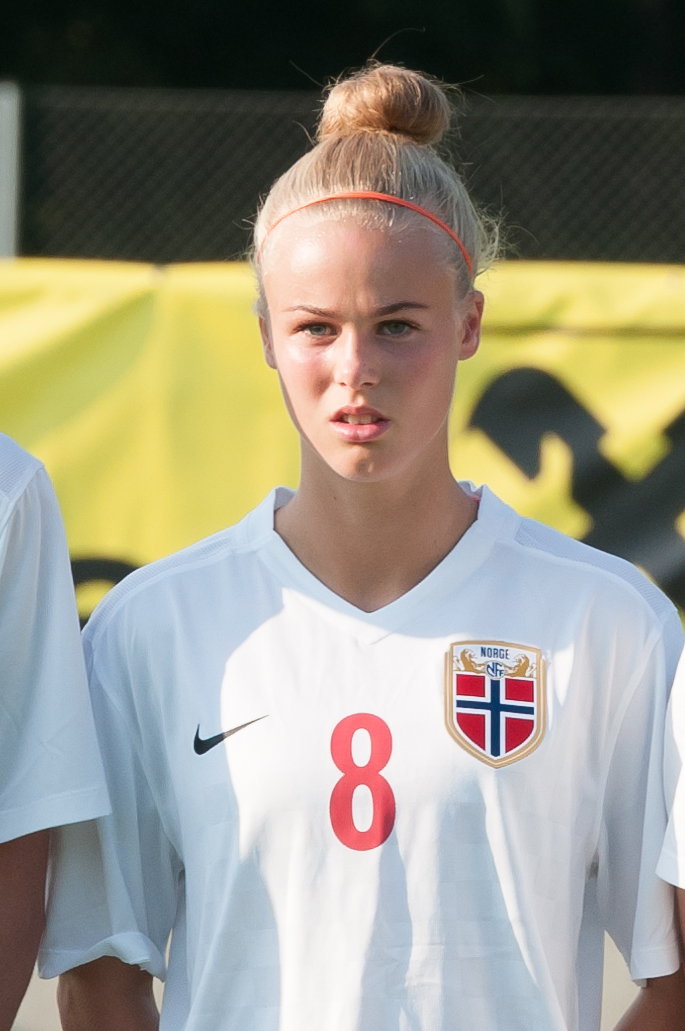

Personal information
- Date of birth: 22 April 1997 (age 29)
- Position: Midfielder

Team information
- Current team: Brann
- Number: 18

Youth career
- Ørnes
- Grand Bodø
- Urædd

Senior career*
Years	Team	Apps	(Gls)
2012–2016	Urædd		
2017–2019	Kolbotn	52	(9)
2020–2021	LSK	32	(6)
2022–2026	Brann	67	(16)
2026–	Genoa	11	(0)

International career^{‡}
2012	Norway U15	2	(0)
2013	Norway U16	8	(4)
2013–2014	Norway U17	7	(1)
2014–2016	Norway U19	25	(4)
2017–2020	Norway U23	12	(0)
- * Club domestic league appearances and goals as of 25 January 2024 ‡ National team caps and goals as of 25 January 2024

Nora Lie Eghdami née Eide Lie (born 22 April 1997) is a Norwegian footballer who plays as a midfielder for Toppserien club SK Brann.

== Career ==
Lie hails from Ørnes and started her youth career in Ørnes IL. She also played youth football for IK Grand Bodø before her family moved to Porsgrunn during her 9th grade year. Lie joined the club Urædd FK and attended the Telemark School of Elite Sport, among others together with the Odds BK boys' team players. She dreamt of the prospect of earning a living wage through football, preferably in the French or German league. When no transfer abroad materialized, Lie studied jurisprudence at the University of Oslo. She graduated in 2023.

Lie was a prolific goalscorer for youth international teams, especially Norway U19, for whom she played 25 times. Lie was first called up to the Norway women's national football team in 2017, as Martin Sjögren selected his very first squad as national team manager. Sjögren labelled her "a very exciting player for the future". Having received signals that she was to be called up again in 2019, to a national team training camp at La Manga, she injured herself before the callup came. Lie was called up yet again in March 2022.

Lie started her senior career in the Norwegian First Division with Urædd FK, and when the team managed to win promotion to the 2016 Toppserien, she stayed with the club for the time being. Urædd struggled in Toppserien, and already in July 2016 she signed for Kolbotn IL. The transfer would take place after the season.

Following two seasons in LSK Kvinner FK, Lie signed for reigning champions IL Sandviken, which was to be rebranded as SK Brann Kvinner. Lie scored the first goal in the 2022 Norwegian Women's Cup final, which Brann eventually won 3–1 over Stabæk.

She took part in Brann's international breakthrough during the 2023–24 UEFA Women's Champions League qualifying rounds, when she scored one of the goals that secured Brann a place in the 2023–24 UEFA Women's Champions League group stage. The team even progressed to the next round.
