= Alena Andreeva =

Russian footballer (born 1997)

Personal information
- Full name: Alena Sergeyevna Andreeva
- Date of birth: 21 November 1997 (age 28)
- Place of birth: Kamensk-Uralsky, Russia
- Position: Forward

Team information
- Current team: Chertanovo Moscow
- Number: 8

Senior career*
Years	Team	Apps	(Gls)
2014	Izmailovo	6	(1)
2015–	Chertanovo Moscow	55	(4)

International career^{‡}
2014–	Russia	15	(0)
- * Club domestic league appearances and goals as of 19:10, 30 August 2019 (UTC) ‡ National team caps and goals as of 19:10, 30 August 2019 (UTC)

Alena Sergeyevna Andreeva (Russian: Алёна Сергеевна Андреева; born 21 November 1997) is a Russian footballer who plays as a forward and has appeared for the Russia women's national team.

== Career ==
Andreeva has been capped for the Russia national team, appearing for the team during the 2019 FIFA Women's World Cup qualifying cycle.

== International goals ==
No.	Date	Venue	Opponent	Score	Result	Competition
1.	25 November 2021	Dalga Arena, Baku, Azerbaijan	Azerbaijan	3–0	4–0	2023 FIFA Women's World Cup qualification
2.	1 July 2025	Serbian FA Sports Center, Stara Pazova, Serbia	Serbia	3–0	3–0	Friendly
