= Russia women's national under-20 football team =

National U-20 association football team

Russia Women's U-20
- Association: Russian Football Union
- Confederation: UEFA (Europe)
- FIFA code: RUS
First colours	Second colours

FIFA U-20 Women's World Cup
- Appearances: 2 (first in 2004)
- Best result: Quarter-finals (2004, 2006)

The Russian U-20 women's national football team is the national under-20 women's association football team of Russia, which is controlled by the Russian Football Union (RFS). They have won the UEFA European Women's Under-19 Championship in 2005 defeating France on penalties.

On 28 February 2022, due to the 2022 Russian invasion of Ukraine and in accordance with a recommendation by the International Olympic Committee (IOC), FIFA and UEFA suspended the participation of Russia, including in the Qatar 2022 World Cup. The Russian Football Union unsuccessfully appealed the FIFA and UEFA bans to the Court of Arbitration for Sport, which upheld the bans.

== Records ==
=== U-20 World Cup record ===
Year	Result	Matches	Wins	Draws	Losses	GF	GA
(Canada) 2002	Did not qualify						
(Thailand) 2004	Quarter-finals	4	1	0	3	9	9
(Russia) 2006	Quarter-finals	4	1	2	1	4	7
(Chile) 2008 to (Costa Rica) 2022	Did not qualify						
(Colombia) 2024	Suspended						
(Poland) 2026	Suspended						
2028	Suspended						
Total	2/13	8	2	2	4	13	16

== Honours ==
=== FIFA U-20 Women's World Cup ===
- FIFA Fair Play Award: 2006

=== UEFA Women's Under-19 Championship ===
- Winners: 2005

Individual

- Golden Player: Elena Danilova (2005)
- Top Scorer: Elena Danilova (2005, 2006)

== Head-to-head record ==
The following table shows Russia's head-to-head record in the FIFA U-20 Women's World Cup.

Opponent	Pld	W	D	L	GF	GA	GD	Win %
Australia	1	0	1	0	1	1	+0	0.00
Brazil	2	0	1	1	2	4	−2	0.00
China	1	0	0	1	0	4	−4	0.00
New Zealand	1	1	0	0	3	2	+1	100.00
South Korea	1	0	0	1	0	2	−2	0.00
Spain	1	1	0	0	4	1	+3	100.00
United States	1	0	0	1	1	4	−3	0.00
Total	8	2	2	4	11	18	−7	25.00

== See also ==
- Russia women's national football team (Senior)
- Russia women's national under-17 football team
- Russia men's national under-20 football team
- Football in Russia
