= 2018 Turkish Women's Cup =

Tournament details
- Host country: Turkey
- Dates: 27 February 2018– 7 March 2018
- Teams: 10 (from 2 confederations)
- Venue: 2 (in 2 host cities)

Final positions
- Champions: France B
- Runners-up: Mexico
- Third place: Ukraine
- Fourth place: Poland

Tournament statistics
- Matches played: 20
- Goals scored: 58 (2.9 per match)
- Attendance: 2,050 (103 per match)
- All statistics correct as of 7 March 2018.

The 2018 Turkish Women's Cup was the second edition of the Turkish Women's Cup, an invitational women's football tournament held annually in Turkey. It took place from 27 February to 7 March 2018.

== Format ==
The twelve invited teams were split into three groups to play a round-robin tournament. Points awarded in the group stage follow the standard formula of three points for a win, one point for a draw and zero points for a loss. In the case of two teams being tied on the same number of points in a group, their head-to-head result determine the higher place.

== Teams ==
Team	FIFA Rankings (December 2017)
Mexico	26
Ukraine	27
Poland	30
Romania	39
Jordan	50
Northern Ireland	55
Kazakhstan	67
Latvia	82
Kosovo	97
France B	—

== Squads ==
=== Kosovo ===
Kosovo

Coach: (Kosovo) Afërdita Fazlija

No.	Pos.	Player	Date of birth (age)	Caps	Goals	Club
	GK	Florentina Kolgeci	30 October 2000 (aged 17)	9	0	(Football Federation of Kosovo) Mitrovica
	GK	Besarta Leci	14 October 1993 (aged 24)	3	0	(German Football Association) VfL Sindelfingen
	GK	Diellza Musa	29 November 1997 (aged 20)	1	0	(Football Federation of Kosovo) Hajvalia
	DF	Liridona Syla	5 February 1986 (aged 32)	8	0	(Football Federation of Kosovo) Mitrovica
	DF	Fjolla Shala	20 March 1993 (aged 24)	5	0	(Football Association of Iceland) Breiðablik
	DF	Valentina Tërnava	6 January 2001 (aged 17)	2	0	(Football Federation of Kosovo) Kosova (P)
	DF	Gjenifer Pjetri	22 April 2001 (aged 16)	2	0	(Football Federation of Kosovo) Dukagjini
	DF	Endrina Elezaj^{GUE}	2 January 1997 (aged 21)	0	0	(Football Federation of Kosovo) Mitrovica
	MF	Blerta Shala	3 December 1998 (aged 19)	11	1	(Football Federation of Kosovo) Mitrovica
	MF	Edona Kryeziu	3 October 1995 (aged 22)	11	0	(Football Federation of Kosovo) Mitrovica
	MF	Feride Kastrati	23 May 1993 (aged 24)	10	0	(Football Federation of Kosovo) Hajvalia
	MF	Qendresa Bajra	11 May 1992 (aged 25)	9	1	(Football Federation of Kosovo) Mitrovica
	MF	Ilirjana Vllasaliu	16 June 1999 (aged 18)	5	0	(Swedish Football Association) IFK Värnamo
	MF	Gresa Berisha	26 April 1998 (aged 19)	4	0	(Football Federation of Kosovo) Mitrovica
	MF	Verona Berisha	5 April 2000 (aged 17)	3	0	(Football Federation of Kosovo) Kosova (P)
	MF	Rina Arifi	29 July 2000 (aged 17)	0	0	(Royal Belgian Football Association) Hoger Op Wolvertem
	FW	Valentina Limani	2 February 1997 (aged 21)	11	1	(German Football Association) 1. FFC Frankfurt
	FW	Agnesa Rexha	4 October 1994 (aged 23)	10	2	(Football Federation of Kosovo) Mitrovica
	FW	Kaltrina Biqkaj	5 August 2000 (aged 17)	10	1	(Football Federation of Kosovo) Intelektualet
	FW	Mirela Jakupi	16 January 2000 (aged 18)	5	2	(Swiss Football Association) Aïre-le-Lignon
	FW	Leonora Ejupi	7 February 2000 (aged 18)	4	0	(German Football Association) Warendorf
	FW	Besjana Reçica	13 April 1996 (aged 21)	3	0	(German Football Association) 1.FFC Recklinghausen 2003
	FW	Leutrime Bushati	18 July 1993 (aged 24)	1	0	(Swiss Football Association) Kloten

Notes

- ^{GUE} = Guest player.

== Group stage ==
The groups and schedule were announced on 22 February 2018.

=== Group A ===
Pos	Team	Pld	W	D	L	GF	GA	GD	Pts
1	Mexico	3	3	0	0	11	1	+10	9
2	Poland	3	2	0	1	4	1	+3	6
3	Jordan	3	1	0	2	4	9	−5	3
4	Latvia	3	0	0	3	2	10	−8	0

Source: Womenssoccerunited
Rules for classification: 1) Points; 2) Goal difference; 3) Goals scored
28 February 2018
11:00

Poland	2–0	Jordan
Guściora 51'; Wiankowska 65'

Alanya
Attendance: 50
Referee: Sturmilov Andrei
28 February 2018
16:00

Mexico	5–0	Latvia
Corral 3', 30'; Mayor 27'; Nieto 71'; Gómez-Junco 90+3'

Alanya
Attendance: 50
Referee: Berladean Vasile

2 March 2018
11:00

Latvia	0–2	Poland
		Winczo 71'; Grabowska 87'

Side, Turkey
Attendance: 100
Referee: Bosca Igor
2 March 2018
16:00

Jordan	1–5	Mexico
Al-Masri 27'		Cuéllar 25'; Johnson 63'; Corral 67'; Mayor 73', 83'

Alanya
Attendance: 70
Referee: Berladean Vasile

4 March 2018
11:00

Jordan	3–2	Latvia
Al-Naber 3'; Jbarah 38'; Jebreen 88'		Fjodorova 57'; Giržda 89'

Side, Turkey
Attendance: 100
Referee: Sturmilov Andrei
4 March 2018
15:00

Mexico	1–0	Poland
Johnson 89'

Alanya
Attendance: 100
Referee: Berladean Vasile

=== Group B ===
Pos	Team	Pld	W	D	L	GF	GA	GD	Pts
1	France B	3	3	0	0	15	0	+15	9
2	Kosovo	3	0	1	2	1	9	−8	1
3	Kazakhstan	3	0	1	2	1	9	−8	1

Source: Womenssoccerunited
Rules for classification: 1) Points; 2) Goal difference; 3) Goals scored
28 February 2018
13:00

France	6–0	Kosovo
Tolmais 3', 37'; Lavogez 12'; Cascarino 42'; Clérac 74'; Nadjim 85'

Alanya
Attendance: 100
Referee: Bosca Igor

2 March 2018
10:00

Kazakhstan	0–6	France
		Nadjim 18'; Dali 31', 50'; Thomas 54'; Butel 67'; Tolmais 89'

Alanya
Attendance: 50
Referee: Leu Stanislav

4 March 2018
15:00

Kosovo	1–1	Kazakhstan
Jakupi 65'		Kirgizbayeva 71'

Side, Turkey
Attendance: 70
Referee: Sturmilov Andrei

=== Group C ===
Pos	Team	Pld	W	D	L	GF	GA	GD	Pts
1	Ukraine	3	2	1	0	5	1	+4	7
2	Northern Ireland	3	1	1	1	4	4	0	4
3	Romania	3	0	2	1	1	4	−3	2

Source: Womenssoccerunited
Rules for classification: 1) Points; 2) Goal difference; 3) Goals scored
28 February 2018
15:00

Ukraine	0–0	Romania

Side, Turkey
Attendance: 150
Referee: Leu Stanislav

2 March 2018
13:00

Romania	1–1	Northern Ireland
Herczeg 62'		Bell 25'

Alanya
Attendance: 100
Referee: Sturmilov Andrei

4 March 2018
13:00

Ukraine	3–1	Northern Ireland
Kalinina 54', 58'; Apanashchenko 68'		McGuinness 65'

Alanya
Attendance: 70
Referee: Leu Stanislav

=== Additional matches ===
28 February 2018
11:00

Northern Ireland	2–0	Kazakhstan
McGuinness 4'; Wade 18'

Side, Turkey
Attendance: 50
Referee: Leu Stanislav
2 March 2018
15:00

Kosovo	0–2	Ukraine
		Apanashchenko 33'; Kravets 45+3'

Side, Turkey
Attendance: 200
Referee: Bosca Igor
4 March 2018
10:00

France	3–0	Romania
Lavogez 15'; Cascarino 26'; Mateo 40'

Alanya
Attendance: 150
Referee: Bosca Igor

=== Ranking of teams for placement matches ===
Rank	Team	Group	Pos	Pld	Pts	GD	GF	Qualification
1	France B	B	1	3	9	+15	15	Final
2	Mexico	A	1	3	9	+10	11	Final
3	Ukraine	C	1	3	7	+4	5	Third place game
4	Poland	A	2	3	6	+3	4	Third place game
5	Northern Ireland	C	2	3	4	0	4	Fifth place game
6	Kosovo	B	2	3	1	−8	1	Fifth place game
7	Jordan	A	3	3	3	−5	4	Seventh place game
8	Romania	C	3	3	2	−3	1	Seventh place game
9	Kazakhstan	B	3	3	1	−8	1	Ninth place game
10	Latvia	A	4	3	0	−8	2	Ninth place game

== Placement matches ==
=== Ninth place game ===
6 March 2018
09:00

Kazakhstan	1–2	Latvia
Nurusheva 60'		Voitāne 79', 90'

Side, Turkey
Attendance: 70
Referee: Berladean Vasile

=== Seventh place game ===
6 March 2018
09:00

Jordan	1–2	Romania
Jbarah 53'		Carp 9'; Voicu 16'

Alanya
Attendance: 50
Referee: Sturmilov Andrei

=== Fifth place game ===
6 March 2018
11:00

Northern Ireland	0–1	Kosovo
		Bajra 86'

Side, Turkey
Attendance: 50
Referee: Berladean Vasile

=== Third place game ===
6 March 2018
11:00

Poland	0–0	Ukraine
Penalties
	1–3

Alanya
Attendance: 70
Referee: Leu Stanislav

=== Final ===
6 March 2018
13:30

France	2–1	Mexico
Cascarino 12'; Butel 40'		Ocampo 82'

Alanya Oba Stadium
Attendance: 400
Referee: Bosca Igor
