= Kosovo women's national football team results (2015–2019) =

This is a list of Kosovo women's national football team results from 2015 to 2019.

== History ==
=== First steps: Participating in a tournament ===
Kosovo before the start of World Cup qualifications participated at 2017 Turkish Women's Cup, Kosovo lost all three matches of this tournament against Poland (0–5), which was also her first international match as a FIFA member, against Romania (0–3) and against the host Turkey (2–4).

=== Debut in World Cup and Euro qualifications ===
Kosovo began to make their debut in the 2019 FIFA Women's World Cup qualification, where Kosovo was drawn with Albania, Greece and Malta. The Kosovars despite the efforts failed to qualify and finished last in the group with three losses.

After failing to qualify for the 2019 FIFA Women's World Cup, Kosovo participated in the UEFA Women's Euro 2021 qualifying, together with Estonia, Russia, Slovenia, Turkey and 2019 World Cup runners-up finisher Netherlands, the Kosovars created their first big surprise, defeating Turkey in a 2–0 home win, which was also the team's first-ever competitive win, victory which increased the enthusiasm which unfortunately did not last long and after the positive results began to experience a decline which resulted in disqualification.

== Fixtures and results ==
=== 2015–2016 ===
19 September 2015 Friendly	Albania	2–2	Kosovo	Durrës, Albania
	Doçi 40'; Bajraktari 43'	Report	Bajramaj 10'; Kaqiu 38'

17 February 2016 Friendly	Albania	1–3	Kosovo	Elbasan, Albania
	Beluli 30'	Report	Kryeziu 17'; Rexha 70', 82'	Stadium: Elbasan Arena

=== 2017 ===
1 March 2017 Turkish Women's Cup	Kosovo	0–5	Poland	Alanya, Turkey
		Report	Winczo 7'; Sikora 26'; Znyrowska 62'; Grabowska 64', 90+2' (pen.)	Stadium: Soccer 2nd Field of Goldcity Hotel

3 March 2017 Turkish Women's Cup	Kosovo	0–3	Romania	Alanya, Turkey
		Report	Carp 6'; Bâtea 19', 28'	Stadium: Soccer 2nd Field of Goldcity Hotel

5 March 2017 Turkish Women's Cup	Kosovo	2–4	Turkey	Alanya, Turkey
	Musa 67'; Krasniqi 72'	Report	Işık 3'; Korkmaz 64'; Altinkulak 73'; Çınar 77'	Stadium: Soccer 2nd Field of Goldcity Hotel

6 April 2019 FIFA Women's World Cup qualification	Albania	3–2	Kosovo	Elbasan, Albania
12:00	Bajraktari 17'; Velaj 75'; Musa 90+6' (o.g.)	Report	Rexha 35', 59'	Stadium: Elbasan Arena; Attendance: 1,500; Referee: Lorraine Clark (Scotland)

8 April 2019 FIFA Women's World Cup qualification	Greece	6–0	Kosovo	Tirana, Albania
12:00	Markou 33'; Chatzigiannidou 39'; Kakambouki 51'; Nati 57', 76'; Sidira 82'	Report		Stadium: Selman Stërmasi Stadium; Attendance: 100; Referee: Amy Rayner (England)

11 April 2019 FIFA Women's World Cup qualification	Kosovo	1–3	Malta	Tirana, Albania
14:00	Shala 80'	Report	Cuschieri 12'; Flask 27'; Theuma 38'	Stadium: Selman Stërmasi Stadium; Attendance: 100; Referee: Amy Rayner (England)

26 November Friendly	Kosovo	3–2	Montenegro	Mitrovica, Kosovo
13:00	Limani 30'; Jakupi 41'; Biqkaj 74'	Report (FFK); Report (FSCG)	Kuč 26'; Bulatović 71'	Stadium: Adem Jashari Olympic Stadium; Referee: Genc Nuza (Kosovo)

=== 2018 ===
28 February 2018 Turkish Women's Cup	France	6–0	Kosovo	Alanya, Turkey
15:00	Tolmais 3', 37'; Lavogez 12'; Cascarino 42'; Clérac 74'; Nadjim 85'	Report (FFF); Report (FFK)
Note: France play with the B team, which consisted of players playing in French championship.

2 March 2018 Turkish Women's Cup	Kosovo	0–2	Ukraine	Alanya, Turkey
17:00		Report	Apanaschenko 33'; Kravets 45+2'

4 March 2018 Turkish Women's Cup	Kosovo	1–1	Kazakhstan	Alanya, Turkey
	Jakupi 66'	Report	Kirgizbaeva 71' (pen.)

6 March 2018 Turkish Women's Cup	Kosovo	1–0	Northern Ireland	Alanya, Turkey
	Bajra 87'	Report

30 August Friendly	Macedonia	0–0	Kosovo	Skopje, Macedonia
17:00		Report		Stadium: Training Centre Petar Miloševski; Referee: Besa Lleshi (Macedonia)

2 September Friendly	Macedonia	0–2	Kosovo	Skopje, Macedonia
17:00		Report	Reçica 73'; Ejupi 86'	Stadium: Training Centre Petar Miloševski; Referee: Irena Velevachkovska (Macedonia)

9 November Friendly	Kosovo	1–4	Ukraine	Antalya, Turkey
	Ejupi 48'	Report	Apanaschenko 10'; Pantsulaia 13'; Derkach 80'; Malakhova 87'

12 November Friendly	Ukraine	4–0	Kosovo	Antalya, Turkey
	Kunin 29' (pen.); Romanenko 34'; Andrukhiv 73'; Kochneva 78'	Report

=== 2019 ===
25 February Friendly	Bulgaria	1–2	Kosovo	Sofia, Bulgaria
	Georgieva 35'	Report	Reçica 10'; Bajra 85'	Stadium: Boyana National Football Center

28 February Friendly	Bulgaria	1–4	Kosovo	Sofia, Bulgaria
	unknown 8'	Report	Asllanaj 49'; Biqkaj 60'; Reçica 71'; Ejupi 78'	Stadium: Boyana National Football Center

5 April Friendly	Kosovo	3–1	North Macedonia	Gjakova, Kosovo
15:00	Uka 21'; Limani 30'; Reçica 90+1'	Report	Dimovska 78'	Stadium: Gjakova City Stadium; Attendance: 500; Referee: Kreshnik Vula (Kosovo)

8 April Friendly	Kosovo	3–3	North Macedonia	Pristina, Kosovo
15:00	Uka 41'; Reçica 54'; Memeti 90+4'	Report	Krstanovska 69'; Ristovska 71' (pen.); Nikolovska 90+3'	Stadium: Fadil Vokrri Stadium

30 August UEFA Women's Euro 2021 qualifying	Kosovo	2–0	Turkey	Pristina, Kosovo
20:00	Uka 33'; L. Syla 39'	Report		Stadium: Fadil Vokrri Stadium; Referee: Emilie Dokset (Norway)

3 September UEFA Women's Euro 2021 qualifying	Slovenia	5–0	Kosovo	Dravograd, Slovenia
	Prašnikar 14', 62'; Zver 41', 56'; Kolbl 48'	Report		Stadium: Dravograd Sports Centre; Referee: Rasa Imanalijeva (Lithuania)

8 October UEFA Women's Euro 2021 qualifying	Estonia	1–2	Kosovo	Tartu, Estonia
18:15 (19:15 EEST)	Loo 22' (pen.)	Report	Uka 41', 56'	Stadium: Tamme Stadium; Referee: Iuliana Demetrescu (Romania)

9 November Friendly	Luxembourg	0–5	Kosovo	Bissen, Luxembourg
16:00		Report	Reçica; Memeti unknown o.g.' Ejupi	Stadium: Terrain ZAC Klengbousbierg; Attendance: 384

== Kosovo versus other countries ==
As of 9 November 2019
Head-to-head records are included only matches as FIFA member.

Team	Pld	W	D	L	GF	GA	GD	Win %
Albania	1	0	0	1	2	3	−1	0.00
Bulgaria	2	2	0	0	6	2	+4	100.00
Estonia	1	1	0	0	2	1	+1	100.00
France	1	0	0	1	0	6	−6	0.00
Greece	1	0	0	1	0	6	−6	0.00
Kazakhstan	1	0	1	0	1	1	+0	0.00
Luxembourg	1	1	0	0	5	0	+5	100.00
Malta	1	0	0	1	1	3	−2	0.00
Montenegro	1	1	0	0	3	2	+1	100.00
North Macedonia	4	2	2	0	8	4	+4	50.00
Northern Ireland	1	1	0	0	1	0	+1	100.00
Poland	1	0	0	1	0	5	−5	0.00
Romania	1	0	0	1	0	3	−3	0.00
Slovenia	1	0	0	1	0	5	−5	0.00
Turkey	2	1	0	1	4	4	+0	50.00
Ukraine	2	0	0	2	1	6	−5	0.00
16 Countries	22	9	3	10	34	51	−17	40.91

== Notes and references ==
=== Notes ===
1. The Kosovo v Macedonia match, originally scheduled for 12 June 2018 at the Adem Jashari Olympic Stadium in Mitrovica was postponed on 9 June due to the death of Fadil Vokrri, the president of the Football Federation of Kosovo. The match was later rescheduled for 30 August and played at the Petar Miloševski Training Centre in Skopje.
2. The Kosovo v Macedonia match, originally scheduled for 14 June 2018 at the Adem Jashari Olympic Stadium in Mitrovica was postponed on 9 June due to the death of Fadil Vokrri, the president of the Football Federation of Kosovo. The match was later rescheduled for 2 September and played at the Petar Miloševski Training Centre in Skopje.
