= 2017 Turkish Women's Cup =

Tournament details
- Host country: Turkey
- Dates: 1–7 March 2017
- Teams: 4 (from 1 confederation)
- Venue: 1 (in 1 host city)

Final positions
- Champions: Poland
- Runners-up: Romania
- Third place: Turkey
- Fourth place: Kosovo

Tournament statistics
- Matches played: 6
- Goals scored: 25 (4.17 per match)
- All statistics correct as of 8 March 2020.

The 2017 Alanya Gold City Cup or 2017 Turkish Women's Cup was the first edition of the Turkish Women's Cup, an invitational women's football tournament held annually in Turkey. It took place from 1 to 7 March 2017.

== Format ==
The four invited teams played a round-robin tournament. Points awarded in the group stage follow the standard formula of three points for a win, one point for a draw and zero points for a loss. In the case of two teams being tied on the same number of points in a group, their head-to-head result determine the higher place, or in case of a tie, the goal difference.

== Teams ==
Team	FIFA Rankings (December 2016)
Kosovo	-
Poland	31
Romania	37
Turkey	56

== Squads ==
=== Kosovo ===
Kosovo

Coach: (Kosovo) Afërdita Fazlija

No.	Pos.	Player	Date of birth (age)	Club
	GK	Diellza Musa	29 November 1997 (aged 19)	(Football Federation of Kosovo) Mitrovica
	GK	Florentina Kolgeci	30 October 2000 (aged 16)	(Football Federation of Kosovo) Hajvalia
	DF	Liridona Syla	5 February 1986 (aged 31)	(Football Federation of Kosovo) Mitrovica
	MF	Besmira Morina	24 June 1987 (aged 29)	(Swedish Football Association) Falköpings
	DF	Fitore Govori	3 August 1987 (aged 29)	(Football Federation of Kosovo) Kosova Prishtinë
	DF	Marigona Durguti	4 May 1995 (aged 21)	(Swedish Football Association) Falköpings
	DF	Antigona Miftari	5 May 1995 (aged 21)	(Football Federation of Kosovo) Mitrovica
	DF	Donjeta Haxha	14 May 1996 (aged 20)	(Football Federation of Kosovo) Mitrovica
	MF	Blerta Kaqiu	24 February 1992 (aged 25)	(Football Federation of Kosovo) Hajvalia
	MF	Feride Kastrati	23 May 1993 (aged 23)	(Football Federation of Kosovo) Llapi
	MF	Qendresa Krasniqi	28 June 1994 (aged 22)	(Swiss Football Association) Yverdon
	MF	Blerina Musa	24 October 1994 (aged 22)	(Football Federation of Kosovo) Mitrovica
	MF	Jehona Ademi	23 September 1995 (aged 21)	(Football Federation of Kosovo) Mitrovica
	MF	Antigona Behluli	15 August 1998 (aged 18)	(Swiss Football Association) Zürich
	MF	Blerta Shala	3 December 1998 (aged 18)	(Swiss Football Association) Zürich
	MF	Marigonë Tahiri	25 February 1999 (aged 18)	(Football Federation of Kosovo) Mitrovica
	FW	Qendresa Bajra	11 May 1992 (aged 24)	(Football Federation of Kosovo) Hajvalia
	FW	Agnesa Rexha	4 October 1994 (aged 22)	(Football Federation of Kosovo) Mitrovica
	FW	Arta Rama	19 April 1995 (aged 21)	(Football Federation of Kosovo) Mitrovica
	FW	Edona Kryeziu	3 October 1995 (aged 21)	(Football Federation of Kosovo) Mitrovica
	FW	Valentina Limani	2 February 1997 (aged 20)	(German Football Association) 1. FFC Frankfurt
	FW	Egzona Zeka	25 April 1997 (aged 19)	(Swiss Football Association) Lugano
	FW	Mimoza Islami	24 February 1998 (aged 19)	(Football Federation of Kosovo) Mitrovica
	FW	Kaltrina Biqkaj	5 August 2000 (aged 16)	(Football Federation of Kosovo) Intelektualet

== Results ==
Pos	Team	Pld	W	D	L	GF	GA	GD	Pts
1	Poland	3	2	1	0	9	3	+6	7
2	Romania	3	2	1	0	8	3	+5	7
3	Turkey	3	1	0	2	6	7	−1	3
4	Kosovo	3	0	0	3	2	12	−10	0

Source: ScoresPro
Rules for classification: 1) Points; 2) Goal difference; 3) Goals scored

Turkey 1–3 Romania

Kosovo 2–4 Turkey

Poland 2–1 Turkey

[Mar 1]

Turkey 1-3 Romania

Kosovo 0-5 Poland

[Mar 3]

Kosovo 0-3 Romania

[Mar 5]

Turkey 4-2 Kosovo

Poland 2-2 Romania

[Mar 7]

Turkey 1-2 Poland
