= 2024 Turkish Women's Cup squads =

List of players competing at the 8th edition of the Turkish Women's Cup

This article lists the squads for the 2024 Turkish Women's Cup, the 8th edition of the Turkish Women's Cup. The cup consisted of a series of friendly games, and was held in Turkey from 21 to 27 February 2024. The four national teams involved in the tournament registered a squad of 23 players.

The age listed for each player is on 21 February 2024, the first day of the tournament. The numbers of caps and goals listed for each player do not include any matches played after the start of tournament. The club listed is the club for which the player last played a competitive match prior to the tournament. The nationality for each club reflects the national association (not the league) to which the club is affiliated. A flag is included for coaches that are of a different nationality than their own national team.

== Squads ==
=== Estonia ===
Coach: Anastassia Morkovkina and Sirje Kapper

The final 22-player squad was announced on 16 February 2024.

No.	Pos.	Player	Date of birth (age)	Caps	Goals	Club
1	GK	Victoria Vihman	5 August 2004 (aged 19)	0	0	(Estonia) Flora
2	DF	Eva-Maria Niit	5 February 2002 (aged 22)	9	0	(Poland) Medyk Konin
3	DF	Siret Räämet	31 December 1999 (aged 24)	37	0	(Estonia) Flora
4	DF	Maarja Saulep	9 May 1991 (aged 32)	22	1	(Estonia) Flora
5	DF	Rahel Repkin	17 June 1998 (aged 25)	10	0	(Austria) Wacker Innsbruck
6	DF	Kristiina Tullus	12 September 1998 (aged 25)	13	0	(Estonia) Flora
7	MF	Liisa Merisalu	15 January 2002 (aged 22)	32	3	(Estonia) Tammeka
8	MF	Kairi Himanen (captain)	11 November 1992 (aged 31)	72	5	(Estonia) Saku Sporting
9	MF	Katrin Kirpu	9 October 2004 (aged 19)	7	1	(Finland) Åland United
10	MF	Jaanika Volkov	20 February 2005 (aged 19)	16	0	(Estonia) Flora
11	FW	Kirkeliis Lillemets	7 December 2005 (aged 18)	0	0	(Estonia) Tammeka
13	GK	Karina Kork	23 February 1995 (aged 28)	40	0	(Estonia) Tabasalu
14	FW	Lisette Tammik	14 October 1998 (aged 25)	65	14	(Estonia) Flora
15	MF	Anette Salei	28 September 2005 (aged 18)	5	0	(Estonia) Tabasalu
16	DF	Kelly Rosen	23 November 1995 (aged 28)	76	1	(Estonia) Flora
17	MF	Mari-Liis Lillemäe	1 September 2000 (aged 23)	48	2	(Austria) Wacker Innsbruck
18	DF	Annegret Kala	3 May 2006 (aged 17)	5	0	(Estonia) Tammeka
19	MF	Vlada Kubassova	23 August 1995 (aged 28)	65	10	(Hungary) Ferencváros
20	MF	Lisandra Rannasto	13 January 2004 (aged 20)	0	0	(Estonia) Saku Sporting
21	MF	Grete Daut	4 January 2000 (aged 24)	23	0	(Norway) Fyllingsdalen
22	FW	Kristina Teern	13 November 2004 (aged 19)	3	0	(Estonia) Flora
23	FW	Aleksandra Kelli	11 August 2006 (aged 17)	0	0	(Estonia) Tammeka

=== Hong Kong ===
Coach: (Brazil) José Ricardo Rambo

The final 19-player squad was announced on 11 February 2024.

No.	Pos.	Player	Date of birth (age)	Caps	Goals	Club
1	GK	Ng Cheuk Wai	19 March 1997 (aged 26)			(Japan) Zebra ladies Iwate
2	DF	Sin Chung Yee	8 August 1992 (aged 31)			(Hong Kong) Grace Citizen
3	DF	Ma Chak Shun	2 March 1996 (aged 27)			(Hong Kong) Chelsea
4	DF	Chu So Kwan	3 March 2004 (aged 19)			(Hong Kong) Kitchee
7	FW	Au Tsz Cheuk Annabelle	24 July 2006 (aged 17)			(Hong Kong) Grace Citizen
8	DF	Wu Choi Yiu	10 September 2004 (aged 19)			(Hong Kong) Chelsea
9	DF	Chung Pui Ki	2 February 1998 (aged 26)			(Hong Kong) Kitchee
10	FW	Leung Hong Kiu Anke	29 September 2006 (aged 17)			(Hong Kong) Chelsea
11	FW	Kwan Wing Yu	6 August 2003 (aged 20)			(Hong Kong) Grace Citizen
12	MF	Wei Lan	21 May 2006 (aged 17)			(Hong Kong) Grace Citizen
13	MF	Tsang Lai Mae Halasan	11 September 2001 (aged 22)			(Hong Kong) 247 FC
14	MF	Cham Ching Man	1 May 1996 (aged 27)			(Hong Kong) Kitchee
15	MF	Fung Sharon	16 July 1999 (aged 24)			(Hong Kong) WSE
18	GK	Chow Kam Yee	11 November 1999 (aged 24)			(Hong Kong) WSE
19	GK	Leung Wai Nga	24 August 1988 (aged 35)			(Hong Kong) Kitchee
20	DF	Wong Hei Tung	8 January 2001 (aged 23)			(Hong Kong) Grace Citizen
21	DF	So Hoi Lam	2 November 1999 (aged 24)			(Hong Kong) Kitchee
22	MF	Chan Yee Hing	28 April 1997 (aged 26)			(Hong Kong) Chelsea
23	MF	Ho Mui Mei	15 March 1993 (aged 30)			(Hong Kong) Kitchee

=== India ===
Coach: Langam Chaoba Devi

The final 23-player squad was announced on 18 February 2024.

No.	Pos.	Player	Date of birth (age)	Caps	Goals	Club
1	GK	Shreya Hooda	25 May 1999 (aged 24)			(India) Odisha
2	DF	Juli Kishan	10 April 2000 (aged 23)			(India) Odisha
3	DF	Hemam Shilky Devi	23 November 2005 (aged 18)			(India) Gokulam Kerala
4	DF	Loitongbam Ashalata Devi (captain)	3 July 1993 (aged 30)			(India) Gokulam Kerala
5	DF	Astam Oraon	5 February 2005 (aged 19)			(India) Odisha
6	MF	Sangita Basfore	12 July 1996 (aged 27)			(India) Sashastra Seema Bal
7	FW	Soumya Guguloth	18 July 2001 (aged 22)			(India) Gokulam Kerala
8	FW	Sanju Yadav	12 September 1997 (aged 26)			(India) Odisha
9	MF	Anju Tamang	22 December 1995 (aged 28)			(India) Gokulam Kerala
10	FW	Pyari Xaxa	18 May 1997 (aged 26)			(India) Odisha
11	FW	Grace Dangmei	5 February 1996 (aged 28)			(India) Gokulam Kerala
12	MF	Indumathi Kathiresan	5 June 1994 (aged 29)			(India) Odisha
13	FW	Sandhiya Ranganathan	20 May 1998 (aged 25)			(India) Gokulam Kerala
14	DF	Sorokhaibam Ranjana Chanu	10 March 1999 (aged 24)			(India) Gokulam Kerala
15	FW	Jyoti Chouhan	6 July 1999 (aged 24)			(Croatia) Dinamo Zagreb
16	MF	Manisha Kalyan	27 November 2001 (aged 22)			(Cyprus) Apollon
17	DF	Dalima Chhibber	30 August 1997 (aged 26)			(India) Kickstart
18	FW	Karishma Shirvoikar	4 August 2001 (aged 22)			(India) Kickstart
19	FW	Kaviya Pakkirisamy	23 December 2002 (aged 21)			(India) Sethu
20	GK	Monalisha Devi	3 July 2006 (aged 17)			(India) Odisha
21	GK	Elangbam Panthoi Chanu	1 February 1996 (aged 28)			(India) Eastern Sporting Union
22	MF	Kajol D'Souza	28 April 2006 (aged 17)			(India) Sethu
23	MF	Karthika Angamuthu	21 November 1999 (aged 24)			(India) Odisha

=== Kosovo ===
Coach: (Sweden) Karin Anneli Andersen

The final 24-player squad was announced on 19 February 2024.

No.	Pos.	Player	Date of birth (age)	Caps	Goals	Club
1	GK	Florentina Kolgeci	30 October 2000 (aged 23)	17	0	(Albania) Tirana
2	DF	Rrezona Ramadani	5 September 2002 (aged 21)	9	1	(Albania) Vllaznia Shkodër
3	DF	Gresa Berisha	26 April 1998 (aged 25)	1	0	(Albania) Tirana
4	MF	Donjeta Halilaj	12 March 2000 (aged 23)	33	7	(Turkey) Beşiktaş
5	DF	Blerta Smaili	8 May 2002 (aged 21)	18	0	(Switzerland) Basel
6	MF	Lumbardha Misini	3 May 2003 (aged 20)	19	0	(Kosovo) Mitrovica
7	FW	Erëleta Memeti (captain)	30 June 1999 (aged 24)	27	10	(Germany) TSG Hoffenheim
8	MF	Blerta Shala	3 December 1998 (aged 25)	41	1	(Kosovo) Mitrovica
9	FW	Kaltrina Biqkaj	5 August 2000 (aged 23)	47	8	(Kosovo) Mitrovica
10	FW	Valentina Limani	2 February 1997 (aged 27)	36	4	(Germany) Eintracht Frankfurt
11	DF	Edona Kryeziu	3 October 1995 (aged 28)	45	0	(Kosovo) Mitrovica
12	GK	Rajmonda Spahiu	25 March 2006 (aged 17)	0	0	(Kosovo) Mitrovica
13	MF	Elizabeta Ejupi	21 April 1994 (aged 29)	6	1	(England) Sunderland
14	MF	Valentina Metaj	3 October 2004 (aged 19)	10	5	(Sweden) IFK Kalmar
15	DF	Fatlinda Ramaj	1 October 2000 (aged 23)	15	0	(Kosovo) EP-COM Hajvalia
16	GK	Djellza Mehmeti	27 October 2006 (aged 17)	0	0	(Kosovo) EP-COM Hajvalia
17	FW	Egzona Zeka	25 April 1997 (aged 26)	6	0	(Kosovo) Mitrovica
18	DF	Feride Kastrati	23 May 1993 (aged 30)	21	1	(Kosovo) EP-COM Hajvalia
19	MF	Loreta Lulaj	24 June 2003 (aged 20)	12	0	(Germany) Wacker München
20	MF	Viola Avduli	22 November 1999 (aged 24)	16	0	(Switzerland) Zürich
21	DF	Agnesa Gashi	21 May 1998 (aged 25)	12	0	(Kosovo) Mitrovica
22	MF	Vanesa Hoti	3 August 1998 (aged 25)	0	0	(Switzerland) Basel
23	FW	Modesta Uka	23 May 1999 (aged 24)	19	6	(Austria) Sturm Graz
24	DF	Laureta Temaj	13 June 2002 (aged 21)	1	0	(Germany) VfB Stuttgart

== Player representation ==
=== By club ===
Clubs with 3 or more players represented are listed.

Players	Club
8	(Estonia) Flora, (India) Odisha
7	(India) Gokulam Kerala, (Kosovo) Mitrovica
6	(Hong Kong) Kitchee
5	(Hong Kong) Grace Citizen
4	(Estonia) Tammeka, (Hong Kong) Chelsea
3	(Kosovo) EP-COM Hajvalia

=== By club nationality ===
Players	Clubs
21	India
18	Hong Kong
16	Estonia
10	Kosovo
4	Germany
3	Albania, Austria, Switzerland
1	Croatia, Cyprus, England, Finland, Hungary, Japan, Norway, Poland, Sweden, Turkey

=== By club federation ===
Players	Federation
48	UEFA
40	AFC

=== By representatives of domestic league ===
National squad	Players
India	21
Hong Kong	18
Estonia	16
Kosovo	10
