= Lumbardha Misini =

Kosovan footballer

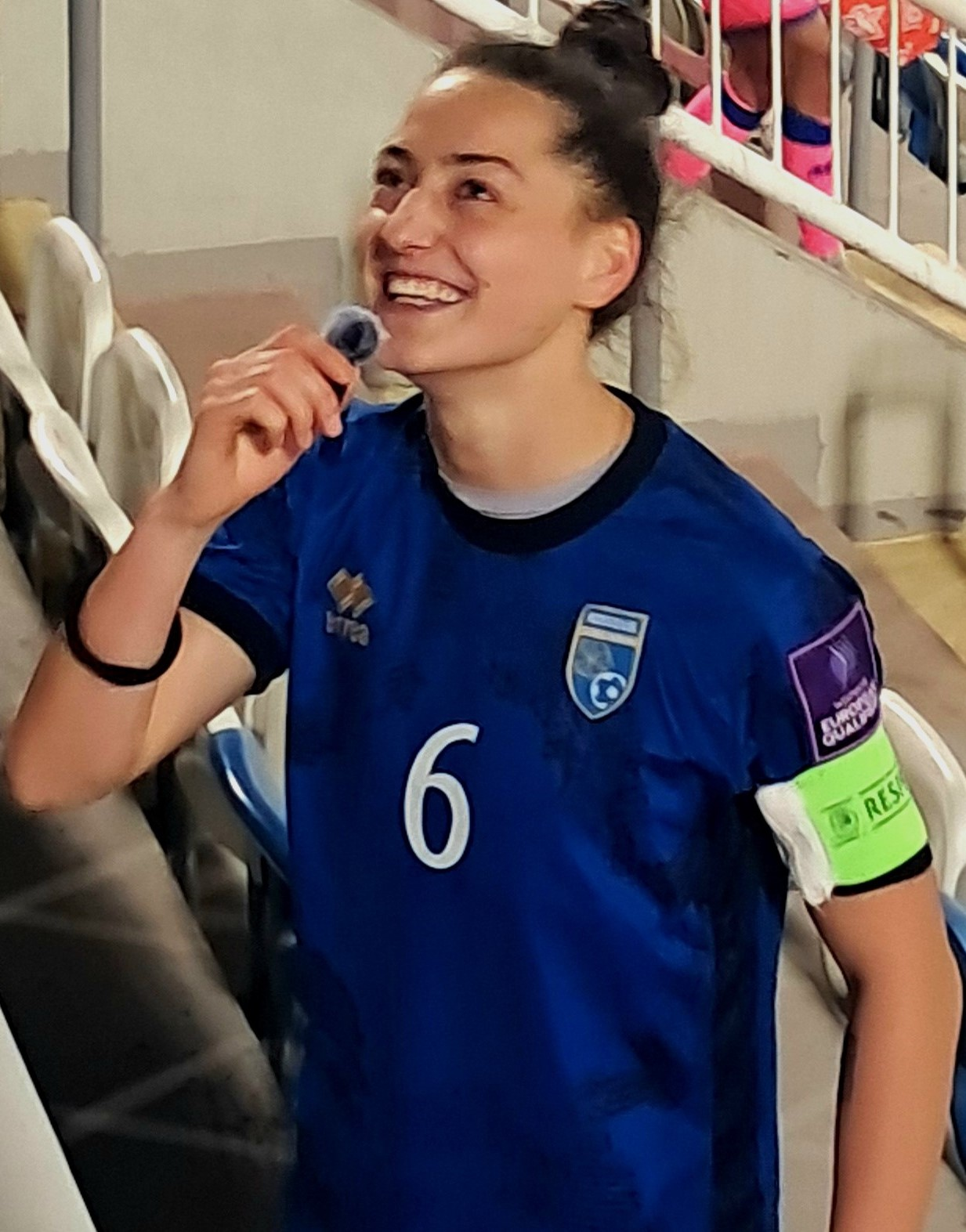
- Misini with Kosovo in 2026

Personal information
- Date of birth: 2 April 2003 (age 23)
- Place of birth: Pristina, Kosovo under UN administration
- Height: 1.68 m (5 ft 6 in)
- Position: Midfielder

Team information
- Current team: Bayer Leverkusen
- Number: 34

Senior career*
Years	Team	Apps	(Gls)
–2021	Vizioni		
2021–2024	EP-COM Hajvalia		
2024	Mitrovica		
2024–2025	Trabzonspor	22	(1)
2025–2026	Servette Chênois	15	(1)
2026–	Bayer Leverkusen	21	(1)

International career^{‡}
2019–2022	Kosovo U19	7	(0)
2019–	Kosovo	28	(0)
- * Club domestic league appearances and goals as of 18 November 2026 ‡ National team caps and goals as of 3 March 2026

Lumbardha Misini (born 2 April 2003) is a Kosovan footballer who plays as a midfielder for Frauen-Bundesliga club Bayer Leverkusen and the Kosovo national team.

== Club career ==
=== Early career ===
Misini began her senior career with Vizioni, where she played until August 2021, when she joined Kosovo League club EP-COM Hajvalia, while shortly after the transfer she was sent on a short-term loan to Albanian Kategoria Superiore club Vllaznia, only for European competition matches. Her debut for Vllaznia came on 20 August 2021 in the 2021–22 UEFA Champions League first qualifying round against Ferencváros after being named in the starting line-up.

After completing the European matches with Vllaznia and returning from her loan spell, Misini became a key player for EP-COM Hajvalia, helping the club win the league title in two consecutive seasons, 2021–22, and 2022–23.

On 30 January 2024, Misini joined Kosovo Superleague side Mitrovica, a rival of EP-COM Hajvalia and one of the main contenders for the league title, where she continued her good form and helped the club regain the league championship after two years.

=== Trabzonspor ===
On 5 September 2024, Misini joined Turkish Super League side Trabzonspor. His debut with Trabzonspor came three days later in a 3–0 away win against Kdz. Ereğlispor after being named in the starting line-up.

=== Servette Chênois ===
On 19 July 2025, Misini joined Swiss Super League side Servette Chênois, on a one-year deal with an option for an additional year extension, and received squad number 6.

=== Bayer Leverkusen ===
On 9 July 2026, Misini joined Frauen-Bundesliga club Bayer Leverkusen on a three-year contract to 30 June 2029.

== Personal life ==
Misini was born in Pristina, Kosovo under UN administration, to Kosovo Albanian parents from Ferizaj.

== Honours ==
EP-COM Hajvalia

- Kosovo League/Superleague: 2021–22, 2022–23

Mitrovica

- Kosovo Superleague: 2023–24
- Kosovar Cup: 2023–24

Kosovo

- Turkish Women's Cup: 2023, 2024
