= Kosovo women's national under-17 football team =

Kosovo Women's U-17
- Nickname: Dardanet (Dardanians)
- Association: Federata e Futbollit të Kosovës (FFK)
- Confederation: UEFA (Europe)
- Head coach: Kushtrim Munishi
- Captain: Rotation
- Top scorer: Aurona Racaj (7)
- Home stadium: FFK National Educational Camp
- FIFA code: KVX
First colours	Second colours	Third colours

First international
- Kosovo 13–0 Georgia (Bascharage, Luxembourg; 24 September 2021)

Biggest win
- Kosovo 13–0 Georgia (Bascharage, Luxembourg; 24 September 2021)

Biggest defeat
- Germany 10–0 Kosovo (Frankfurt, Germany; 19 March 2025)

The Kosovo women's national under-17 football team (Albanian: Kombëtarja e futbollit të femrave të Kosovës nën 17 vjeç; Serbian: Женска фудбалска репрезентација Косова до 17. године, romanized: Ženska fudbalska reprezentacija Kosova do 17. godine) is the national under-17 women's football team of Kosovo and is controlled by the Football Federation of Kosovo.

== History ==
=== Permitting by FIFA to play friendlies ===
On 6 February 2013, FIFA gave the permission to play international friendly games against other member associations. Whereas, on 13 January 2014, there was a change of this permit that forbade Kosovo to play against the national teams of the countries of the former Yugoslavia. Club teams were also allowed to play friendlies and this happened after a FIFA Emergency Committee meeting. However, it was stipulated that clubs and representative teams of the Football Federation of Kosovo may not display national symbols as flags, emblems, etc. or play national anthems. The go-ahead was given after meetings between the Football Association of Serbia and Sepp Blatter.

=== Membership in UEFA and FIFA ===
In September 2015 at an UEFA Executive Committee meeting in Malta was approved the request from the federation to the admission in UEFA to the next Ordinary Congress to be held in Budapest. On 3 May 2016, at the Ordinary Congress. Kosovo were accepted into UEFA after members voted 28–24 in favor of Kosovo. Ten days later, Kosovo was accepted in FIFA during their 66th congress in Mexico with 141 votes in favour and 23 against.

== Competitive record ==
=== UEFA European Championship ===
UEFA European Championship record										UEFA European Championship qualifying						
Year	Round	Pos	Pld	W	D	L	GF	GA	Squad	Pos	Pld	W	D	L	GF	GA
(Switzerland) 2008 to (Faroe Islands) 2021	Team did not exist															
(Bosnia and Herzegovina) 2022	Did not qualify									4th	6	2	1	3	19	16
(Estonia) 2023	Did not qualify									4th	6	2	0	4	16	14
(Sweden) 2024	Did not qualify									4th	6	2	1	3	4	11
(Faroe Islands) 2025	Did not qualify									4th	5	1	1	3	4	23
(Northern Ireland) 2026	To be determined															
(Finland) 2027	To be determined															
Total	—	0/1	0	0	0	0	0	0	—	4/4	23	7	3	13	43	64

== Players ==
=== Current squad ===
- The following players have been called up for the 2022 UEFA Women's Under-17 Championship qualifications.
- All caps and goals as of 30 September 2021 after match against Luxembourg, only competitive matches are included.

No.	Pos.	Player	Date of birth (age)	Caps	Goals	Club
12	GK	Djellza Mehmeti	2007 (age 18–19)	3	0	unknown
1	GK	Alma Demiri	2005 (age 20–21)	2	0	(German Football Association) 1. FC Köln
2	DF	Esma Bytyqi	2005 (age 20–21)	3	0	(Football Federation of Kosovo) Vizioni
3	DF	Shyhrete Racaj (captain)	2005 (age 20–21)	3	0	(Football Federation of Kosovo) Dukagjini
4	DF	Elsa Raci	2005 (age 20–21)	3	0	(Football Federation of Kosovo) Dukagjini
5	DF	Kreshnike Ramaja	2005 (age 20–21)	3	0	(Football Federation of Kosovo) Dukagjini
20	DF	Dorinë Qorri	2005 (age 20–21)	2	0	(Football Federation of Kosovo) 16 Qershori
10	MF	Eriola Delija	2005 (age 20–21)	3	2	(Swiss Football Association) Basel
22	MF	Bardha Gjonbalaj	2005 (age 20–21)	3	1	(Football Federation of Kosovo) Kosova VR Prishtinë
6	MF	Vesa Paqarizi	2005 (age 20–21)	3	0	(Football Federation of Kosovo) Malisheva
8	MF	Albina Berisha	2005 (age 20–21)	2	0	(Football Federation of Kosovo) Malisheva
13	FW	Aurona Racaj	2005 (age 20–21)	3	7	(Football Federation of Kosovo) Dukagjini
7	FW	Rreze Gashi	2005 (age 20–21)	3	4	(Football Federation of Kosovo) Malisheva
9	FW	Rinesa Alija	2005 (age 20–21)	3	3	(German Football Association) SG 99 Andernach
19	FW	Antigona Shabani	2005 (age 20–21)	3	1	(Football Federation of Kosovo) Presingu
14	FW	Olsa Musliu	2005 (age 20–21)	3	0	(Football Federation of Kosovo) Kosova VR Prishtinë
21	FW	Sahare Berisha	2006 (age 19–20)	1	0	(Football Federation of Kosovo) Kosova VR Prishtinë
18	FW	Shkurta Llumnica	2005 (age 20–21)	0	0	(Football Federation of Kosovo) Kosova VR Prishtinë
23	FW	Ariola Grainca	2005 (age 20–21)	0	0	(Football Federation of Kosovo) Vizioni
15	FW	Alba Shabani	2006 (age 19–20)	0	0	(Football Federation of Kosovo) Presingu

== See also ==
Women's

- National team
- Under-19
Men's

- National team
- Under-21
- Under-19
- Under-17
- Futsal

== Notes and references ==
=== Notes ===
1. The club listed is the club for which the player last played a competitive match prior to the call-up.
