= Fatlinda Ramaj =

Kosovan footballer (born 2000)

Personal information
- Date of birth: 30 September 2000 (age 26)
- Place of birth: Drenas, Kosovo
- Position: Midfielder

Team information
- Current team: Trabzon
- Number: 8

Senior career*
Years	Team	Apps	(Gls)
- A&N
	Feronikeli	= 15	
2022–24	Hajvalia		
2024–25	Mitrovica		
2025–	Trabzon	= 15	(3)

International career^{‡}
2020–	Kosovo	10	(0)
- * Club domestic league appearances and goals as of 15 October 2025 ‡ National team caps and goals as of 17 July 2025

Fatlinda Ramaj (born 30 September 2000) is a Kosovan professional women's football midfielder who plays for the Turkish Super League club Trabzon, and the Kosovo women's national team.

== Club career ==
Ramaj played for the clubs A&N, Feronikeli and from 2022 on for Hajvalia, before she transferred to Mitrovica on 1 August 2024.

After six months with Mitrovica, she moved to Turkey in January 2025, and signed with the Super League club Trabzon to play in the second half of the 2024–25 Turkish Women's Football Super League. Her contract was extended for the next season.

== International career ==
Ramaj has been a member of the Kosovo national team since 2020. She played at the UEFA Women's Euro 2022 qualifying Group A, 2023 FIFA Women's World Cup qualification – UEFA Group F and 2024–25 UEFA Women's Champions League qualifying rounds matches.

== See also ==
- List of Kosovo women's international footballers
