= Syla =

Syla is a surname. Notable people with the surname include:

- Alberina Syla (born 1997), German-born Kosovan footballer
- Brilant Syla (born 1991), Albanian footballer
- Liridona Syla (born 1986), Kosovan footballer

== See also ==
- Deities of Slavic religion
