= Suada Jashari =

Kosovan–Albanian football player and manager

Personal information
- Full name: Suada Samir Jashari
- Date of birth: 9 October 1988 (age 38)
- Place of birth: Pristina, SFR Yugoslavia (now Kosovo)
- Position: Midfielder

Team information
- Current team: Mitrovica (manager)

Senior career*
Years	Team	Apps	(Gls)
2005–2012	Kosova Prishtinë		
2012–2013	Juban Danja	8	(6)
2013–2014	Tirana AS	5	(4)
2014–2018	Vllaznia Shkodër	51	(12)
2018–2021	Mitrovica		
Total		64	(22)

International career
2013–2020	Albania	22	(2)

Managerial career
- 2021–: Mitrovica
- * Club domestic league appearances and goals

Suada Samir Jashari (born 9 October 1988) is a Kosovan-born Albanian football former player and current manager who coaches Kosovo Women's Football League club KFF Mitrovica. A midfielder during her playing career, she has been a member of the Albania women's national team.

== Club career ==
Jashari started playing football in Kosova Prishtinë at the age of 15. On 18 October 2012, Jashari joined Albanian Women's National Championship side Juban Danja. Two days later, she made her debut in a 1–1 home draw against Tirana AS after being named in the starting line-up. Jashari then continued her career in Albanian Women's National Championship clubs like Tirana AS (2013–2014) and Vllaznia Shkodër (2014–2018). On 26 January 2018, Jashari returned to her homeland and joined Kosovo Women's Football League club Mitrovica.

== International career ==
On 4 April 2013, Jashari made her debut with Albania in the 2015 FIFA Women's World Cup qualification preliminary round match against Malta after being named in the starting line-up. Her last international match was on 1 December 2020 against Portugal in Lisbon.

== Managerial career ==
=== Mitrovica ===
On 12 January 2021, Jashari was appointed manager of Kosovo Women's Football League club Mitrovica. On 28 February 2021, she had her first match as Mitrovica manager in a 0–0 home draw against A&N.

== Personal life ==
Jashari was born in Pristina, SFR Yugoslavia to Kosovo Albanian parents from Mitrovica. On 11 July 2012, he obtained an Albanian passport.

== See also ==
- List of Albania women's international footballers
