= 2021 UEFA Women's Under-17 Championship qualification =

Tournament details
- Dates: Qualifying round: Cancelled (originally February 2021); Elite round: Abolished; Play-offs: Cancelled (originally March 2021)
- Teams: 48 (from 1 confederation)

The 2021 UEFA Women's Under-17 Championship qualifying competition is a women's under-17 football competition that will determine the seven teams joining the automatically qualified hosts Faroe Islands in the 2021 UEFA Women's Under-17 Championship final tournament. Players born on or after 1 January 2004 were eligible to participate.

Apart from the Faroe Islands, 48 of the remaining 54 UEFA member national teams entered the qualifying competition, where the original format consisted of two rounds: Qualifying round, which would have take place in autumn 2020, and Elite round, which would also have taken place in spring 2021. However, due to the COVID-19 pandemic in Europe, UEFA announced on 13 August 2020 that after consultation with the 55 member associations, the qualifying round was delayed to February 2021, and the elite round was abolished and replaced by play-offs, contested in March 2021 by the 12 qualifying round group winners and two best runners-up to determine the teams qualifying for the final tournament.

On 18 December 2020, the UEFA Executive Committee announced that the tournament had been cancelled after consultation with all 55 member associations due to the ongoing COVID-19 pandemic.

== Format ==
The qualifying competition originally consisted of the following two rounds:

- Qualifying round: The 48 teams were to be drawn into 12 groups of four teams. Each group would have been played in single round-robin format at one of the teams selected as hosts after the draw. The 12 group winners, the 12 runners-up, and the four third-placed teams with the best record against the first and second-placed teams in their group were to advance to the elite round.
- Elite round: The 28 teams were to be drawn into seven groups of four teams. Each group would have been played in single round-robin format at one of the teams selected as hosts after the draw. The seven group winners were to qualify for the final tournament.

After the format change, the qualifying competition consisted of the following two rounds:

- Qualifying round: The draw remained the same as before. The 12 group winners and the two runners-up with the best record against the first and third-placed teams in their group were to advance to the play-offs.
- Play-offs: The 14 teams were to be drawn into seven ties. The seven winners would have qualified for the final tournament.

== Qualifying round ==
=== Draw ===
The draw for the qualifying round was held on 29 November 2019, 09:00 CET (UTC+1), at the UEFA headquarters in Nyon, Switzerland.

The teams were seeded according to their coefficient ranking, calculated based on the following:

- 2016 UEFA Women's Under-17 Championship final tournament and qualifying competition (qualifying round and elite round)
- 2017 UEFA Women's Under-17 Championship final tournament and qualifying competition (qualifying round and elite round)
- 2018 UEFA Women's Under-17 Championship final tournament and qualifying competition (qualifying round and elite round)
- 2019 UEFA Women's Under-17 Championship final tournament and qualifying competition (qualifying round and elite round)

Each group contained one team from Pot A, one team from Pot B, one team from Pot C, and one team from Pot D. Based on the decisions taken by the UEFA Emergency Panel, the following pairs of teams could not be drawn in the same group: Russia and Ukraine, Russia and Kosovo, Serbia and Kosovo, Bosnia and Herzegovina and Kosovo, Azerbaijan and Armenia.

Final tournament hosts
Team	Coeff.	Rank
**Faroe Islands**	1.000	—

Teams entering qualifying round

Pot A
Team	Coeff.	Rank
Germany	33.167	1
Spain	30.056	2
England	23.444	3
Netherlands	22.056	4
Norway	19.278	5
Denmark	15.389	6
Italy	15.056	7
France	14.278	8
Poland	13.722	9
Republic of Ireland	13.722	10
Austria	13.611	11
Finland	13.500	12

Pot B
Team	Coeff.	Rank
Czech Republic	12.389	13
Serbia	12.333	14
Portugal	12.333	15
Belgium	11.667	16
Iceland	11.000	17
Sweden	11.000	18
Hungary	10.500	19
Switzerland	10.000	20
Slovenia	9.667	21
Russia	8.667	22
Scotland	8.167	23
Greece	8.167	24

Pot C
Team	Coeff.	Rank
Bulgaria	6.000	25
Wales	5.833	26
Bosnia and Herzegovina	5.833	27
Northern Ireland	5.500	28
Ukraine	5.500	29
Belarus	5.000	30
Turkey	4.833	31
Slovakia	4.333	32
Azerbaijan	3.500	33
Lithuania	3.333	34
Romania	3.167	35
Croatia	2.333	36

Pot D
Team	Coeff.	Rank
Georgia	1.667	37
Israel	1.667	38
Estonia	1.333	39
Montenegro	1.333	40
Latvia	1.000	41
Malta	1.000	42
Moldova	0.333	43
Kazakhstan	0.333	44
North Macedonia	0.333	45
Albania	0.000	46
Armenia	0.000	47
Kosovo	—	48

Notes

- Teams marked in **bold** have qualified for the final tournament.

Did not enter
Andorra	Cyprus	Gibraltar
Liechtenstein	Luxembourg	San Marino

=== Groups ===
The qualifying round was originally scheduled to be played by 8 November 2020, but some groups were later rescheduled to late November. However, due to the COVID-19 pandemic in Europe, UEFA announced on 13 August 2020 that after consultation with the 55 member associations, the qualifying round was delayed to February 2021.

Times are CET (UTC+1), as listed by UEFA (local times, if different, are in parentheses).

==== Group 1 ====
Originally scheduled to be played between 8–14 October, later rescheduled to 10–16 November 2020.

Pos	Team	Pld	W	D	L	GF	GA	GD	Pts	Qualification
1	Finland	0	0	0	0	0	0	0	**0**	Play-offs
2	Hungary	0	0	0	0	0	0	0	**0**	Play-offs if among two best runners-up
3	Turkey (H)	0	0	0	0	0	0	0	**0**	
4	Israel	0	0	0	0	0	0	0	**0**	

Source: UEFA
Rules for classification: Tiebreakers
(H) Hosts
17 February 2021

Finland	Cancelled	Israel
	Report

17 February 2021

Turkey	Cancelled	Hungary
	Report

20 February 2021

Finland	Cancelled	Turkey
	Report

20 February 2021

Hungary	Cancelled	Israel
	Report

23 February 2021

Hungary	Cancelled	Finland
	Report

23 February 2021

Israel	Cancelled	Turkey
	Report

==== Group 2 ====
Originally scheduled to be played between 3–9 September, later rescheduled to 2–8 November 2020.

Pos	Team	Pld	W	D	L	GF	GA	GD	Pts	Qualification
1	Germany	0	0	0	0	0	0	0	**0**	Play-offs
2	Belgium	0	0	0	0	0	0	0	**0**	Play-offs if among two best runners-up
3	Azerbaijan	0	0	0	0	0	0	0	**0**	
4	Malta (H)	0	0	0	0	0	0	0	**0**	

Source: UEFA
Rules for classification: Tiebreakers
(H) Hosts
10 February 2021

Germany	Cancelled	Malta
	Report

10 February 2021

Azerbaijan	Cancelled	Belgium
	Report

13 February 2021

Germany	Cancelled	Azerbaijan
	Report

13 February 2021

Belgium	Cancelled	Malta
	Report

16 February 2021

Belgium	Cancelled	Germany
	Report

16 February 2021

Malta	Cancelled	Azerbaijan
	Report

==== Group 3 ====
Originally scheduled to be played between 2–8 November, later rescheduled to 16–22 November 2020.

Pos	Team	Pld	W	D	L	GF	GA	GD	Pts	Qualification
1	Republic of Ireland	0	0	0	0	0	0	0	**0**	Play-offs
2	Portugal (H)	0	0	0	0	0	0	0	**0**	Play-offs if among two best runners-up
3	Wales	0	0	0	0	0	0	0	**0**	
4	North Macedonia	0	0	0	0	0	0	0	**0**	

Source: UEFA
Rules for classification: Tiebreakers
(H) Hosts
18 February 2021

Republic of Ireland	Cancelled	North Macedonia
	Report

18 February 2021

Wales	Cancelled	Portugal
	Report

21 February 2021

Republic of Ireland	Cancelled	Wales
	Report

21 February 2021

Portugal	Cancelled	North Macedonia
	Report

24 February 2021

Portugal	Cancelled	Republic of Ireland
	Report

24 February 2021

North Macedonia	Cancelled	Wales
	Report

==== Group 4 ====
Originally scheduled to be played between 3–9 October 2020.

Pos	Team	Pld	W	D	L	GF	GA	GD	Pts	Qualification
1	Denmark	0	0	0	0	0	0	0	**0**	Play-offs
2	Switzerland (H)	0	0	0	0	0	0	0	**0**	Play-offs if among two best runners-up
3	Slovakia	0	0	0	0	0	0	0	**0**	
4	Kazakhstan	0	0	0	0	0	0	0	**0**	

Source: UEFA
Rules for classification: Tiebreakers
(H) Hosts
9 February 2021

Denmark	Cancelled	Kazakhstan
	Report

9 February 2021

Slovakia	Cancelled	Switzerland
	Report

12 February 2021

Denmark	Cancelled	Slovakia
	Report

12 February 2021

Switzerland	Cancelled	Kazakhstan
	Report

15 February 2021

Switzerland	Cancelled	Denmark
	Report

15 February 2021

Kazakhstan	Cancelled	Slovakia
	Report

==== Group 5 ====
Originally scheduled to be played between 2–8 October, later rescheduled to 31 October – 6 November 2020.

Pos	Team	Pld	W	D	L	GF	GA	GD	Pts	Qualification
1	Spain	0	0	0	0	0	0	0	**0**	Play-offs
2	Russia	0	0	0	0	0	0	0	**0**	Play-offs if among two best runners-up
3	Bulgaria (H)	0	0	0	0	0	0	0	**0**	
4	Armenia	0	0	0	0	0	0	0	**0**	

Source: UEFA
Rules for classification: Tiebreakers
(H) Hosts
7 February 2021

Spain	Cancelled	Armenia
	Report

7 February 2021

Bulgaria	Cancelled	Russia
	Report

10 February 2021

Spain	Cancelled	Bulgaria
	Report

10 February 2021

Russia	Cancelled	Armenia
	Report

13 February 2021

Russia	Cancelled	Spain
	Report

13 February 2021

Armenia	Cancelled	Bulgaria
	Report

==== Group 6 ====
Originally scheduled to be played between 1–7 October, later rescheduled to 25–31 October 2020.

Pos	Team	Pld	W	D	L	GF	GA	GD	Pts	Qualification
1	England	0	0	0	0	0	0	0	**0**	Play-offs
2	Slovenia	0	0	0	0	0	0	0	**0**	Play-offs if among two best runners-up
3	Northern Ireland (H)	0	0	0	0	0	0	0	**0**	
4	Moldova	0	0	0	0	0	0	0	**0**	

Source: UEFA
Rules for classification: Tiebreakers
(H) Hosts
4 February 2021

England	Cancelled	Moldova
	Report

4 February 2021

Northern Ireland	Cancelled	Slovenia
	Report

7 February 2021

England	Cancelled	Northern Ireland
	Report

7 February 2021

Slovenia	Cancelled	Moldova
	Report

10 February 2021

Slovenia	Cancelled	England
	Report

10 February 2021

Moldova	Cancelled	Northern Ireland
	Report

==== Group 7 ====
Originally scheduled to be played between 28 September – 4 October, later rescheduled to 15–21 November 2020.

Pos	Team	Pld	W	D	L	GF	GA	GD	Pts	Qualification
1	France	0	0	0	0	0	0	0	**0**	Play-offs
2	Iceland	0	0	0	0	0	0	0	**0**	Play-offs if among two best runners-up
3	Ukraine	0	0	0	0	0	0	0	**0**	
4	Estonia (H)	0	0	0	0	0	0	0	**0**	

Source: UEFA
Rules for classification: Tiebreakers
(H) Hosts
February 2021

France	Cancelled	Estonia
	Report

February 2021

Ukraine	Cancelled	Iceland
	Report

February 2021

France	Cancelled	Ukraine
	Report

February 2021

Iceland	Cancelled	Estonia
	Report

February 2021

Iceland	Cancelled	France
	Report

February 2021

Estonia	Cancelled	Ukraine
	Report

==== Group 8 ====
Originally scheduled to be played between 10–16 October, later rescheduled to 21–27 October 2020.

Pos	Team	Pld	W	D	L	GF	GA	GD	Pts	Qualification
1	Poland	0	0	0	0	0	0	0	**0**	Play-offs
2	Serbia	0	0	0	0	0	0	0	**0**	Play-offs if among two best runners-up
3	Croatia (H)	0	0	0	0	0	0	0	**0**	
4	Montenegro	0	0	0	0	0	0	0	**0**	

Source: UEFA
Rules for classification: Tiebreakers
(H) Hosts
9 February 2021

Poland	Cancelled	Montenegro
	Report

9 February 2021

Croatia	Cancelled	Serbia
	Report

12 February 2021

Poland	Cancelled	Croatia
	Report

12 February 2021

Serbia	Cancelled	Montenegro
	Report

15 February 2021

Serbia	Cancelled	Poland
	Report

15 February 2021

Montenegro	Cancelled	Croatia
	Report

==== Group 9 ====
Originally scheduled to be played between 7–13 October, later rescheduled to 1–7 November 2020.

Pos	Team	Pld	W	D	L	GF	GA	GD	Pts	Qualification
1	Netherlands	0	0	0	0	0	0	0	**0**	Play-offs
2	Sweden	0	0	0	0	0	0	0	**0**	Play-offs if among two best runners-up
3	Romania	0	0	0	0	0	0	0	**0**	
4	Albania (H)	0	0	0	0	0	0	0	**0**	

Source: UEFA
Rules for classification: Tiebreakers
(H) Hosts
7 February 2021

Netherlands	Cancelled	Albania
	Report

7 February 2021

Romania	Cancelled	Sweden
	Report

10 February 2021

Netherlands	Cancelled	Romania
	Report

10 February 2021

Sweden	Cancelled	Albania
	Report

13 February 2021

Sweden	Cancelled	Netherlands
	Report

13 February 2021

Albania	Cancelled	Romania
	Report

==== Group 10 ====
Originally scheduled to be played between 14–20 October 2020.

Pos	Team	Pld	W	D	L	GF	GA	GD	Pts	Qualification
1	Italy	0	0	0	0	0	0	0	**0**	Play-offs
2	Scotland	0	0	0	0	0	0	0	**0**	Play-offs if among two best runners-up
3	Belarus (H)	0	0	0	0	0	0	0	**0**	
4	Latvia	0	0	0	0	0	0	0	**0**	

Source: UEFA
Rules for classification: Tiebreakers
(H) Hosts
February 2021

Italy	Cancelled	Latvia
	Report

February 2021

Belarus	Cancelled	Scotland
	Report

February 2021

Italy	Cancelled	Belarus
	Report

February 2021

Scotland	Cancelled	Latvia
	Report

February 2021

Scotland	Cancelled	Italy
	Report

February 2021

Latvia	Cancelled	Belarus
	Report

==== Group 11 ====
Originally scheduled to be played between 21–27 October 2020.

Pos	Team	Pld	W	D	L	GF	GA	GD	Pts	Qualification
1	Norway	0	0	0	0	0	0	0	**0**	Play-offs
2	Czech Republic	0	0	0	0	0	0	0	**0**	Play-offs if among two best runners-up
3	Bosnia and Herzegovina (H)	0	0	0	0	0	0	0	**0**	
4	Georgia	0	0	0	0	0	0	0	**0**	

Source: UEFA
Rules for classification: Tiebreakers
(H) Hosts
18 February 2021

Norway	Cancelled	Georgia
	Report

18 February 2021

Bosnia and Herzegovina	Cancelled	Czech Republic
	Report

21 February 2021

Norway	Cancelled	Bosnia and Herzegovina
	Report

21 February 2021

Czech Republic	Cancelled	Georgia
	Report

24 February 2021

Czech Republic	Cancelled	Norway
	Report

24 February 2021

Georgia	Cancelled	Bosnia and Herzegovina
	Report

==== Group 12 ====
Originally scheduled to be played between 8–14 October, later rescheduled to 8–14 November 2020.

Pos	Team	Pld	W	D	L	GF	GA	GD	Pts	Qualification
1	Austria	0	0	0	0	0	0	0	**0**	Play-offs
2	Greece	0	0	0	0	0	0	0	**0**	Play-offs if among two best runners-up
3	Lithuania (H)	0	0	0	0	0	0	0	**0**	
4	Kosovo	0	0	0	0	0	0	0	**0**	

Source: UEFA
Rules for classification: Tiebreakers
(H) Hosts
February 2021

Austria	Cancelled	Kosovo
	Report

February 2021

Lithuania	Cancelled	Greece
	Report

February 2021

Austria	Cancelled	Lithuania
	Report

February 2021

Greece	Cancelled	Kosovo
	Report

February 2021

Greece	Cancelled	Austria
	Report

February 2021

Kosovo	Cancelled	Lithuania
	Report

=== Ranking of second-placed teams ===
To determine the two best second-placed teams from the qualifying round which would have advanced to the play-offs, only the results of the second-placed teams against the first and third-placed teams in their group were to be taken into account.

Pos	Grp	Team	Pld	W	D	L	GF	GA	GD	Pts	Qualification
1	1	Group 1 second place	0	0	0	0	0	0	0	0	Play-offs
2	2	Group 2 second place	0	0	0	0	0	0	0	0	Play-offs
3	3	Group 3 second place	0	0	0	0	0	0	0	0	
4	4	Group 4 second place	0	0	0	0	0	0	0	0	
5	5	Group 5 second place	0	0	0	0	0	0	0	0	
6	6	Group 6 second place	0	0	0	0	0	0	0	0	
7	7	Group 7 second place	0	0	0	0	0	0	0	0	
8	8	Group 8 second place	0	0	0	0	0	0	0	0	
9	9	Group 9 second place	0	0	0	0	0	0	0	0	
10	10	Group 10 second place	0	0	0	0	0	0	0	0	
11	11	Group 11 second place	0	0	0	0	0	0	0	0	
12	12	Group 12 second place	0	0	0	0	0	0	0	0	

Source: UEFA
Rules for classification: 1) points; 2) goal difference; 3) goals scored; 4) disciplinary points; 5) coefficient ranking; 6) drawing of lots.

== Elite round ==
The draw for the elite round would originally be held on 8 December 2020 at the UEFA headquarters in Nyon, Switzerland, and the matches were originally scheduled to be played in spring 2021. However, due to the COVID-19 pandemic in Europe, UEFA announced on 13 August 2020 that after consultation with the 55 member associations, the elite round was abolished and replaced by play-offs.

== Play-offs ==
The 14 teams were to be drawn into seven ties. The seven winners would have qualified for the final tournament. The play-offs were scheduled to be played in March 2021.

Qualified teams

- Group 1 winner
- Group 2 winner
- Group 3 winner
- Group 4 winner
- Group 5 winner
- Group 6 winner
- Group 7 winner
- Group 8 winner
- Group 9 winner
- Group 10 winner
- Group 11 winner
- Group 12 winner
- 1st best runner-up
- 2nd best runner-up

Times up to 27 March 2021 are CET (UTC+1), thereafter times are CEST (UTC+2), as listed by UEFA (local times, if different, are in parentheses).

== Qualified teams ==
The following eight teams were to qualify for the final tournament.

Team	Qualified as	Qualified on	Previous appearances in Women's Under-17 Euro^{1}
Faroe Islands	Hosts	24 September 2019	0 (debut)
TBD	Play-off winners	March 2021	
TBD	Play-off winners	March 2021	
TBD	Play-off winners	March 2021	
TBD	Play-off winners	March 2021	
TBD	Play-off winners	March 2021	
TBD	Play-off winners	March 2021	
TBD	Play-off winners	March 2021	

^{1} Bold indicates champions for that year. Italic indicates hosts for that year.
