= Donjeta Haxha =

Kosovan footballer

Personal information
- Date of birth: 14 May 1996 (age 30)
- Place of birth: Mitrovica, FR Yugoslavia (now Kosovo)
- Position: Defender

Senior career*
Years	Team	Apps	(Gls)
2017	Mitrovica		
2017	Hajvalia		

International career^{‡}
2014	Albania U19	2	(0)
2017	Kosovo	3	(0)
- * Club domestic league appearances and goals ‡ National team caps and goals as of 5 March 2017

Donjeta Haxha (born 14 May 1996) is a Kosovan footballer who plays as a defender. She has been a member of the Kosovo women's national team.

== Club career ==
Haxha has played for KFF Mitrovica and KFF Hajvalia in Kosovo.

== International career ==
Haxha is of Albanian descent. In 2014, she represented Albania at the 2015 UEFA Women's Under-19 Championship qualification. In March 2017, she played for the senior Kosovo women's team at the four-nation Turkish Women's Cup.

== See also ==
- List of Kosovo women's international footballers
