= Donika Grajqevci =

Kosovan footballer

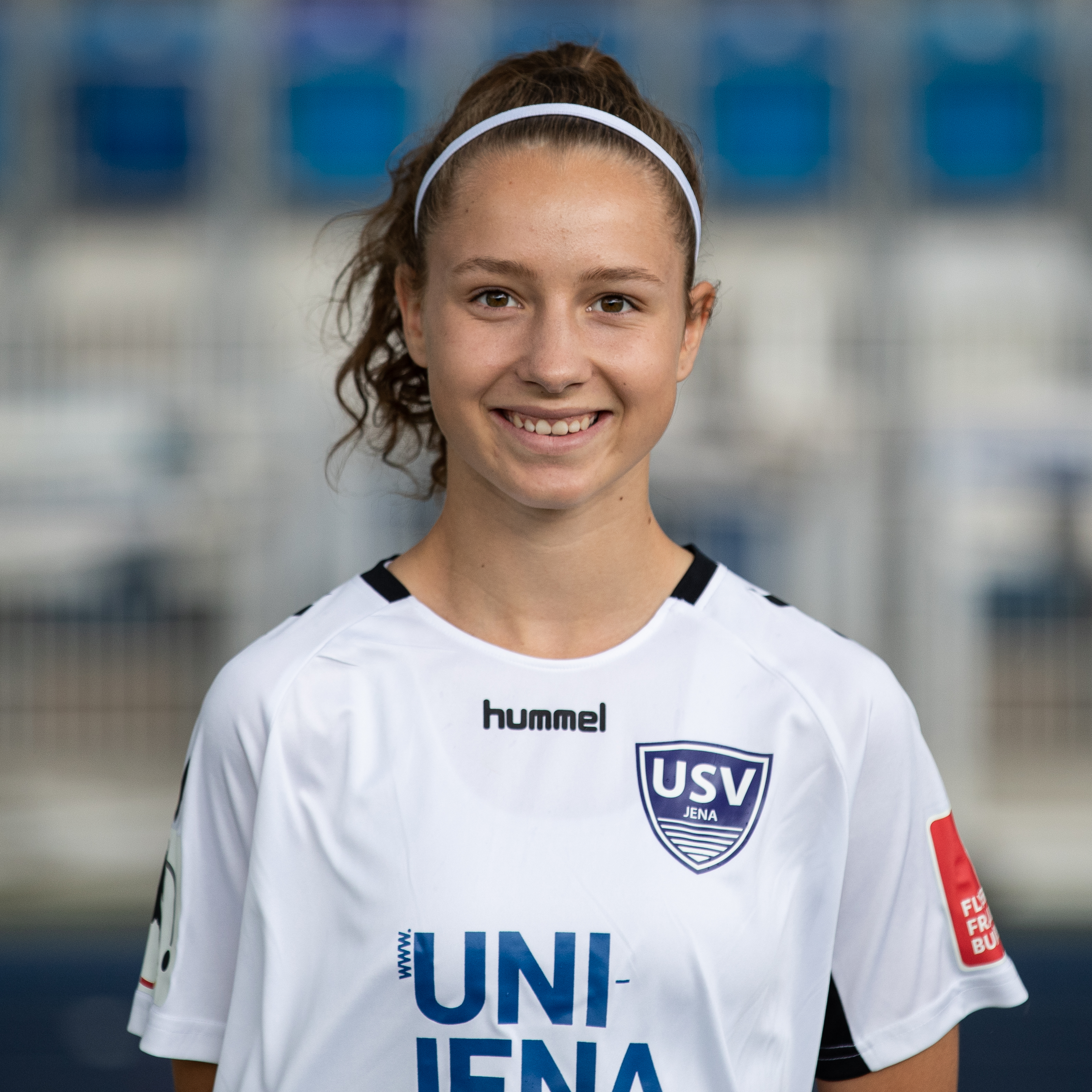

Personal information
- Full name: Donika Grajqevci
- Date of birth: 14 November 2002 (age 23)
- Place of birth: Germany,
- Height: 1.52 m (5 ft 0 in)
- Position: Midfielder

Team information
- Current team: Carl Zeiss Jena
- Number: 9

Youth career
- –2019: Magdeburger

Senior career*
Years	Team	Apps	(Gls)
2019	Magdeburger	3	(1)
2019–	Carl Zeiss Jena (Note: Known until the 2019-20 season as FF USV Jena.)	30	(2)

International career^{‡}
2019	Kosovo U19	3	(0)
2020–	Kosovo	10	(0)
- * Club domestic league appearances and goals as of 3 April 2021 ‡ National team caps and goals as of 8 April 2021

Donika Grajqevci (born 14 November 2002) is a Kosovan footballer who plays as a midfielder for 2. Frauen-Bundesliga club, FC Carl Zeiss Jena and the Kosovo national team. She has also played for the Kosovo U19 team.

== See also ==
- List of Kosovo women's international footballers
