= KFF Jakova =

Women's football club in Kosovo

- Full name: Klubi Futbollistik për Femra Jakova
- Founded: 2010; 15 years ago
- Ground: Gjakova City Stadium
- Capacity: 6,000
- League: Kosovo Superleague
- 2021–22: Kosovo League, 8th of 13

KFF Jakova (Albanian: Klubi Futbollistik për Femra Jakova) is a women's football club based in Gjakova, Kosovo. The club competes in Kosovo Women's Football League which is the top tier of women's football in the country. Their home ground is the Gjakova City Stadium which has a seating capacity of 6,000.

== See also ==
- List of football clubs in Kosovo
