= KFF Liria Prizren =

Women's football club in Kosovo

KFF Liria
- Full name: Klubi Futbollistik për Femra Liria
- Founded: 1 February 1930; 95 years ago
- Ground: Përparim Thaçi Stadium
- Manager: Rexhep Gaxholli
- League: Kosovo First League
- 2021–22: Kosovo League, 10th of 13 (relegated)

KFF Liria (Albanian: Klubi Futbollistik për Femra Liria) is a women's football club based in Prizren, Kosovo. The club has competed in the Kosovo Women's Football League, which is the top tier of women's football in the country, since the 2017/18 season. Their home ground is the Përparim Thaçi Stadium, which has a seating capacity of 10,000.

== See also ==
- List of football clubs in Kosovo
