= Kosovo women's national under-19 football team =

Kosovo Women's Under-19
- Nickname: Dardanët (Dardanians)
- Association: Federata e Futbollit të Kosovës (FFK)
- Confederation: UEFA (Europe)
- Head coach: Albina Rrahmani
- Captain: Rotation
- Most caps: As FIFA member: Diellza Hyseni Kaltrina Biqkaj Leonora Ejupi Aulona Xhema Verona Berisha (6)
- Top scorer: As FIFA member
- Home stadium: FFK National Educational Camp
- FIFA code: KVX
First colours	Second colours	Third colours

First international
- Germany 3–0 Kosovo (Duisburg, Germany; 12 September 2017)

Biggest win
- Kosovo 7–0 Gibraltar (Pristina, Kosovo; 8 November 2022)

Biggest defeat
- Germany 6–0 Kosovo (Dungannon, Northern Ireland; 2 October 2018)

The Kosovo women's national under-19 football team (Albanian: Kombëtarja e futbollit të femrave të Kosovës nën 19 vjeç; Serbian: Женска фудбалска репрезентација Косова до 19. године, romanized: Ženska fudbalska reprezentacija Kosova do 19. godine) is the national under-19 women's football team of Kosovo and is controlled by the Football Federation of Kosovo.

== History ==
=== Permitting by FIFA to play friendlies ===
On 6 February 2013, FIFA gave the permission to play international friendly games against other member associations. Whereas, on 13 January 2014, there was a change of this permit that forbade Kosovo to play against the national teams of the countries of the former Yugoslavia. Club teams were also allowed to play friendlies and this happened after a FIFA Emergency Committee meeting. However, it was stipulated that clubs and representative teams of the Football Federation of Kosovo may not display national symbols as flags, emblems, etc. or play national anthems. The go-ahead was given after meetings between the Football Association of Serbia and Sepp Blatter.

=== Membership in UEFA and FIFA ===
In September 2015 at an UEFA Executive Committee meeting in Malta was approved the request from the federation to the admission in UEFA to the next Ordinary Congress to be held in Budapest. On 3 May 2016, at the Ordinary Congress. Kosovo were accepted into UEFA after members voted 28–24 in favor of Kosovo. Ten days later, Kosovo was accepted in FIFA during their 66th congress in Mexico with 141 votes in favour and 23 against.

== Competitive record ==
=== UEFA European Championship ===
UEFA European Championship record										Qualification record							
Era	Year	Round	Pos	Pld	W	D	L	GF	GA	Year	Pos	Pld	W	D	L	GF	GA
Under-18	1998 to (Sweden) 1999	Part of Serbia and Montenegro								—							
Under-18	(France) 2000 to (Norway) 2001	Not a UEFA member								—							
Under-19	(Sweden) 2002 to (Israel) 2015	Not a UEFA member								—							
Under-19	(Slovakia) 2016 to (Northern Ireland) 2017	Could not enter								—							
Under-19	(Switzerland) 2018	Did not qualify								(Switzerland) 2018	3rd	3	0	1	2	1	6
Under-19	(Scotland) 2019	Did not qualify								(Scotland) 2019	3rd	3	1	1	1	5	7
Under-19	(Georgia (country)) ~~2020~~	Cancelled								(Georgia (country)) 2020	4th	3	0	1	2	3	16
Under-19	(Belarus) ~~2021~~	Cancelled								(Belarus) ~~2021~~	Cancelled						
Under-19	(Czech Republic) 2022	Did not qualify								(Czech Republic) 2022	2nd	6	4	0	2	11	7
Under-19	(Belgium) 2023	Did not qualify								(Belgium) 2023	2nd	2	1	0	1	7	1
Under-19	(Lithuania) 2024	Did not qualify								(Lithuania) 2024	1st (B)	6	5	0	1	19	6
Under-19	(Poland) 2025	Did not qualify								(Poland) 2025	1st (B)	6	3	0	3	12	10
Under-19	(Bosnia and Herzegovina) 2026	TBD								(Bosnia and Herzegovina) 2026	TBD						
Under-19	(Hungary) 2027	TBD								(Hungary) 2027	TBD						
Total		0/26		0	0	0	0	0	0	Total	7/7	29	14	3	12	58	53

== Players ==
=== Current squad ===
- The following players have been called up for the 2019 UEFA Women's Under-19 Championship qualifications.
- All caps and goals as of 8 October 2018 after match against Estonia, only competitive matches are included.
- Players in **bold** are call up or have played at least one full international match with national A team.

No.	Pos.	Player	Date of birth (age)	Caps	Goals	Club
1	GK	**Florentina Kolgeci**	30 October 2000 (age 26)	5	0	(Football Federation of Kosovo) Mitrovica
12	GK	Erda Podvorica	3 June 2000 (age 26)	2	0	(Football Federation of Kosovo) Bazeli 2015
4	DF	**Valentina Tërnava**	6 January 2001 (age 25)	6	0	(Football Federation of Kosovo) Kosova (P)
3	DF	Diellza Hyseni	11 October 2001 (age 25)	6	0	(Football Federation of Kosovo) Bazeli 2015
5	DF	**Gjenifer Pjetri**	22 April 2001 (age 25)	5	0	(Football Federation of Kosovo) Dukagjini
2	DF	Bleona Zhabari	10 March 2001 (age 25)	4	0	(Football Federation of Kosovo) Mitrovica
13	DF	Albulena Fejza	5 September 2002 (age 24)	2	0	(Football Federation of Kosovo) Dukagjini
10	MF	**Verona Berisha** (Captain)	5 April 2000 (age 26)	6	0	(Football Federation of Kosovo) Kosova (P)
6	MF	**Erjona Emërllahu**	20 July 2001 (age 25)	3	0	unknown
18	MF	Rrezona Ramadani	5 September 2002 (age 24)	3	0	(Football Federation of Kosovo) AFF TSC Kosova
19	MF	**Anjeza Rexhepi**	7 August 2001 (age 25)	2	0	(Danish Football Association) Vejle
20	MF	**Argnesa Rexhepi**	23 November 2000 (age 25)	1	0	unknown
21	MF	Liridona Leka	9 October 2002 (age 24)	1	0	unknown
8	MF	Aulona Xhema	17 August 2004 (age 22)	4	0	(The Football Association) West Ham United
15	MF	Sabrije Krasniqi	27 May 2001 (age 25)	0	0	(German Football Association) MSV Duisburg
7	FW	**Leonora Ejupi**	7 February 2000 (age 26)	6	0	(German Football Association) Warendorf
14	FW	Jehona Shala	28 May 2001 (age 25)	5	1	(Albanian Football Federation) Vllaznia Shkodër
17	FW	**Flaka Asllanaj**	14 May 2001 (age 25)	3	2	(German Football Association) Borussia Mönchengladbach
16	FW	**Fleta Musaj**	7 May 2000 (age 26)	3	1	(Football Federation of Kosovo) Liria

== Coaching staff ==
Position	Name
Head coach	(Kosovo) Albina Rrahmani
Assistant coach	(Kosovo) Megzon Visoka
Goalkeeping coach	(Kosovo) Labinot Qosa
Physiotherapists	(Kosovo) Mentor Sfishta
Doctor	(Kosovo) Milazim Gjoci

== See also ==
Women's

- National team
- Under-17
Men's

- National team
- Under-21
- Under-19
- Under-17
- Futsal

== Notes and references ==
=== Notes ===
1. The club listed is the club for which the player last played a competitive match prior to the call-up.
