= KFF Bazeli =

Women's football club in Kosovo

- Full name: Klubi Futbollistik për Femra Bazeli
- Founded: 2005; 20 years ago
- Ground: Biçec Sports Field
- Capacity: 500
- League: Kosovo Superleague
- 2023–2024: 8th

KFF Bazeli (Albanian: Klubi Futbollistik për Femra Bazeli) is a women's football club based in Biçec, Kosovo. The club competes in Kosovo Women's Football League which is the top tier of women's football in the country. Their home ground is the Biçec Sports Field which has a viewing capacity of 500.

== See also ==
- List of football clubs in Kosovo
