= Diellza Musa =

Kosovo Albanian footballer

Personal information
- Full name: Diellza Musa
- Date of birth: 29 November 1997 (age 28)
- Place of birth: Mitrovica, FR Yugoslavia
- Position: Goalkeeper

Team information
- Current team: Kosovo (goalkeeping coach)

Senior career*
| Years | Team | Apps | (Gls) |
| 2014 | Mitrovica | | |
| 2014 | Kinostudio | 3 | (0) |
| 2014–2015 | Mitrovica | | |
| 2015–2017 | Vllaznia Shkodër | | |
| 2017 | Hajvalia | | |
| 2017–2018 | Yverdon | | |
| 2018 | Hajvalia | | |
| 2018–2019 | Feronikeli | | |
| 2019–2021 | Mitrovica | | |
| Total | | +3 | (0) |

International career
| 2015 | Albania U19 | 3 | (0) |
| 2017 | Kosovo | 1 | (0) |

Managerial career
- 2022–: Kosovo (goalkeeping coach)
- * Club domestic league appearances and goals

Diellza Musa (born 29 November 1997) is a Kosovan professional football coach and former player who is the current goalkeeping coach of the Kosovo national team.

== International career ==
=== Albania ===
On 15 September 2015, Musa made her debut with Albania U19 in a UEFA Euro 2016 qualification match against Austria U19 after being named in the starting line-up.

=== Kosovo ===
On 27 February 2017, Musa was named as part of the Kosovo squad for 2017 Alanya Goldcity Women's Cup. On 3 March 2017, she made her debut with Kosovo in a match against Romania after being named in the starting line-up.

== See also ==
- List of Kosovo women's international footballers
