= KFF Malisheva =

Women's football club in Kosovo

- Full name: Klubi Futbollistik për Femra Malisheva
- Founded: 2010; 15 years ago
- Ground: Liman Gegaj Stadium
- Capacity: 1,800
- League: Kosovo Superleague
- 2024–2025: 3rd

KFF Malisheva (Albanian: Klubi Futbollistik për Femra Malisheva) is a women's football club based in Mališevo, Kosovo. The club competes in Kosovo Women's Football League which is the top tier of women's football in the country. Their home ground is the Liman Gegaj Stadium which has a seating capacity of 1,800.

== See also ==
- List of football clubs in Kosovo
