= 2021 UEFA Women's Under-17 Championship =

Tournament details
- Host country: Faroe Islands
- Dates: Cancelled (originally 2–14 May)
- Teams: 8 (from 1 confederation)
- Venue(s): 2 (in 2 host cities)

The 2021 UEFA Women's Under-17 Championship (also known as UEFA Women's Under-17 Euro 2021) was originally to be held as the 13th edition of the UEFA Women's Under-17 Championship, the annual international youth football championship organised by UEFA for the women's under-17 national teams of Europe. The Faroe Islands were originally scheduled to host the tournament between 2 and 14 May 2021. A total of eight teams were to play in the tournament, with players born on or after 1 January 2004 eligible to participate. On 18 December 2020, UEFA announced the tournament was cancelled due to the COVID-19 pandemic in Europe.

Germany were to be the defending champions, having won the last tournament held in 2019, with the 2020 edition cancelled due to the COVID-19 pandemic in Europe.

On 18 December 2020, the UEFA Executive Committee announced that the tournament was cancelled after consultation with all 55 member associations due to the ongoing COVID-19 pandemic.

== Host selection ==
The timeline of host selection was as follows:

- 11 January 2019: bidding procedure launched
- 28 February 2019: deadline to express interest
- 27 March 2019: Announcement by UEFA that declaration of interest were received from 17 member associations to host one of the UEFA national team youth final tournaments (UEFA European Under-19 Championship, UEFA Women's Under-19 Championship, UEFA European Under-17 Championship, UEFA Women's Under-17 Championship) in 2021 and 2022 (although it was not specified which association were interested in which tournament)
- 28 June 2019: Submission of bid dossiers
- 24 September 2019: Selection of successful host associations by the UEFA Executive Committee at its meeting in Ljubljana

For the UEFA European Women's Under-17 Championship final tournaments of 2021 and 2022, the Faroe Islands and Bosnia and Herzegovina were selected as hosts respectively.

== Qualification ==
A total of 49 UEFA nations entered the competition, and with the hosts Faroe Islands qualifying automatically, the original format would have seen the other 48 teams competing in the qualifying competition, which once consisted of two rounds: Qualifying round, which was to take place in autumn 2020, and Elite round, which was also to take place in spring 2021, to determine the remaining seven spots in the final tournament. However, due to the COVID-19 pandemic in Europe, UEFA announced on 13 August 2020 that after consultation with the 55 member associations, the qualifying round was delayed to February 2021, and the elite round was abolished and replaced by play-offs, contested in March 2021 by the 12 qualifying round group winners and two best runners-up to determine the teams qualifying for the final tournament.

=== Qualified teams ===
The following teams originally qualified for the final tournament.

Team	Method of qualification	Appearance (planned)	Last appearance	Previous best performance
Faroe Islands	Hosts	1st	—	Debut
N/A	Play-off winners			
N/A	Play-off winners			
N/A	Play-off winners			
N/A	Play-off winners			
N/A	Play-off winners			
N/A	Play-off winners			
N/A	Play-off winners			

== Venues ==
Tórshavn	Toftir
Tórsvøllur	Svangaskarð
Capacity: 5,000	Capacity: 6,000
