= Brilant Syla =

Albanian association football player

Personal information
- Full name: Brilant Syla
- Date of birth: 27 February 1991 (age 35)
- Place of birth: Tetovo, SFR Yugoslavia
- Position: Striker

Senior career*
Years	Team	Apps	(Gls)
2009–2010	Renova	0	(0)
2010–2011	Shkëndija	0	(0)
2011	Drita		
2011	Gjilani		
2012	Korabi		
2013–2014	Vrapčište		
2014	Gostivari		
2015	Elbasani	7	(0)
2015-	Vëllazërimi		
- * Club domestic league appearances and goals

Brilant Syla (born 27 February 1991) is an ethnic Albanian professional football player from the Republic of Macedonia who played for KF Elbasani in the Albanian Superliga.
