= Florentina Kolgeci =

Kosovar footballer (born 2000)

Personal information
- Full name: Florentina Kolgeci
- Date of birth: 30 October 2000 (age 26)
- Place of birth: Vraniq, Kosovo under UN administration
- Height: 1.77 m (5 ft 10 in)
- Position: Goalkeeper

Team information
- Current team: Amed
- Number: 1

Youth career
- 2012: 13 Qershori
- 2012: Feranda

Senior career*
Years	Team	Apps	(Gls)
2012–2016	13 Qershori		
2016–2017	Hajvalia		
2017–2023	Mitrovica		
2023–2024	Tirana	19	(0)
2024–2025	Gramshi	21	(0)
2025–	Amed	31	(0)

International career^{‡}
2017–2018	Kosovo U19	5	(0)
2017–	Kosovo	16	(0)
- * Club domestic league appearances and goals as of 14 November 2026 ‡ National team caps and goals as of 30 November 2020

Florentina Kolgeci (born 30 October 2000) is a Kosovan professional footballer who plays as a goalkeeper for Turkish Super League club Amed, and the Kosovo national team.

== Club career ==
She began her football journey at the age of 13 with the club 13 Qershori of Suva Reka, after receiving a special permit to play in the Kosovo League. At that time, there were no youth teams for girls, and she often played against much older opponents. Initially, Kolgeci played as a winger and forward, before later switching to the goalkeeper position after being asked to fill in during a match.

Kolgeci's early club career included stints with Feranda and 13 Qershori, before joining Hajvalia at age 15. She made her debut in the 2016–17 UEFA Champions League with Hajvalia, appearing against Apollon Limassol. She then joined Mitrovica, where she spent five seasons, winning league titles and cups, and gaining recognition for her performances. With Mitrovica, she faced top European clubs, including Vfl Wolfsburg, and contributed to several historic results for her team.

In 2023, Kolgeci moved to Albanian Kategoria Superiore, signing for Tirana, and later joined Gramshi. During her time in Albania, she was part of a memorable victory over Vllaznia, handing the champions their first loss in 12 years.

Kolgeci moved to Turkey in September 2025, and signed with the Diyarbakır-based club Amed to play in the 2025–26 Turkish Super League.

== International career ==
Kolgeci has been capped for the Kosovo national team, appearing for the team during the 2019 FIFA Women's World Cup qualifying cycle. She has also represented Kosovo at the U19 level.

== See also ==
- List of Kosovo women's international footballers
