= Dominika Grabowska =

Polish footballer (born 1998)

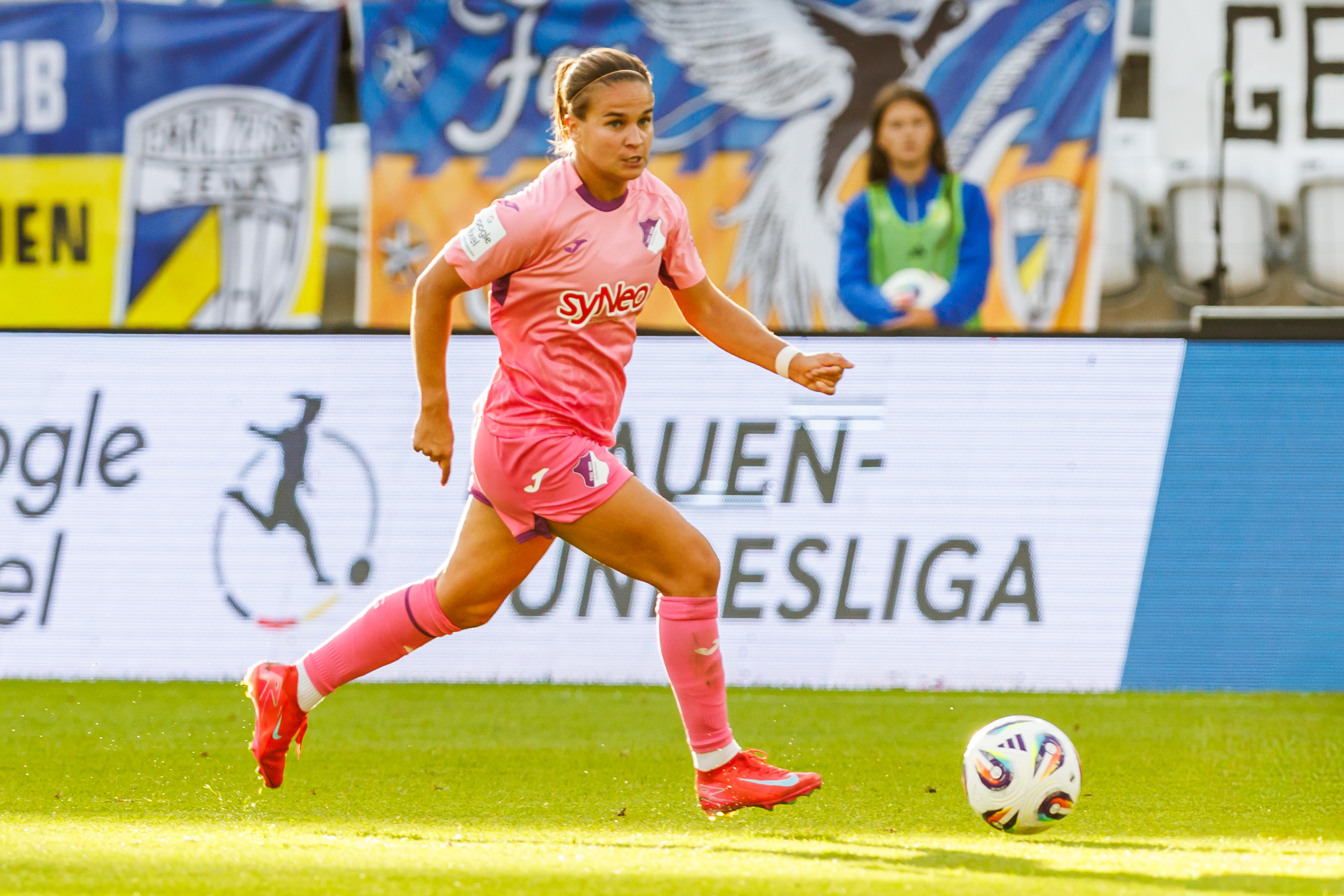
- Grabowska with TSG Hoffenheim in 2025

Personal information
- Date of birth: 26 December 1998 (age 27)
- Place of birth: Pruszków, Poland
- Position: Midfielder

Team information
- Current team: Legia Warsaw
- Number: 8

Senior career*
Years	Team	Apps	(Gls)
–2014	Praga Warsaw		
2014–2017	KŚ AZS Wrocław		
2017–2020	Górnik Łęczna	62	(21)
2020–2024	Fleury	65	(13)
2024–2026	TSG Hoffenheim	29	(3)
2026–	Legia Warsaw	6	(1)

International career^{‡}
2013	Poland U17	6	(4)
2014–2017	Poland U19	11	(7)
2014–	Poland	91	(9)
- * Club domestic league appearances and goals as of 21:38, 19 November 2026 (UTC) ‡ National team caps and goals as of 19:52, 2 December 2025 (UTC)

Dominika Grabowska (born 26 December 1998) is a Polish professional footballer who plays as a midfielder for Ekstraliga club Legia Warsaw.

== Career statistics ==
=== International ===
As of match played 2 December 2025

Appearances and goals by national team and year
National team	Year	Apps	Goals
Poland	2014	1	0
Poland	2015	8	4
Poland	2016	8	0
Poland	2017	3	0
Poland	2018	11	1
Poland	2019	9	1
Poland	2020	6	0
Poland	2021	10	1
Poland	2022	8	1
Poland	2023	6	0
Poland	2024	11	1
Poland	2025	10	0
Total		91	9

Scores and results list Poland's goal tally first, score column indicates score after each Grabowska goal.

List of international goals scored by Dominika Grabowska
No.	Date	Venue	Opponent	Score	Result	Competition
1	11 February 2015	Lipót, Hungary	Hungary	5–2	7–2	Friendly
2	6 April 2015	Eerikkilä, Tammela, Finland	Finland	3–1	3–1	Friendly
3	22 October 2015	Stadion Miejski, Tychy, Poland	Slovakia	2–0	2–0	UEFA Euro 2017 qualifying
4	27 November 2015	CSR Orhei, Orhei, Moldova	Moldova	3–0	3–1	UEFA Euro 2017 qualifying
5	2 March 2018	Side, Turkey	Latvia	1–0	2–0	2018 Turkish Women's Cup
6	3 October 2019	Dimotiko Gipedo Agia Napa, Ayia Napa, Cyprus	Cyprus	3–0	5–1	Friendly
7	11 June 2021	Pinatar Arena Football Center, San Pedro del Pinatar, Spain	Finland	1–2	2–2	Friendly
8	7 April 2022	Stadion Miejski, Gdynia, Poland	Armenia	5–0	12–0	2023 FIFA World Cup qualification
9	4 June 2024	Stadion Miejski, Gdynia, Poland	Germany	1–0	1–3	UEFA Euro 2025 qualifying

== Honours ==
Górnik Łęczna

- Ekstraliga: 2017–18, 2018–19, 2019–20
- Polish Cup: 2017–18, 2019–20
