= KFF Llapi =

Women's football club in Kosovo

- Full name: Klubi Futbollistik për Femra Llapi
- Founded: 2015; 10 years ago
- Ground: Zahir Pajaziti Stadium
- Capacity: 5,000
- League: Kosovo Superleague
- 2024–2025: 5th

KFF Llapi (Albanian: Klubi Futbollistik për Femra Llapi) is a women's football club based in Podujevo, Kosovo. The club competes in Kosovo Women's Football League which is the top tier of women's football in the country. Their home ground is the Zahir Pajaziti Stadium which has a seating capacity of 5,000.

== See also ==
- List of football clubs in Kosovo
