= Qendresa Krasniqi =

Albanian footballer (born 1994)

Personal information
- Date of birth: 28 June 1994 (age 32)
- Place of birth: Pristina, FR Yugoslavia (now Kosovo)
- Position: Midfielder

Team information
- Current team: FC Basel Frauen
- Number: 10

Senior career*
Years	Team	Apps	(Gls)
2016–2017	Hajvalia		
2017–2020	Yverdon	84	(17)
2020–2021	Aarau	5	(6)
2021–2022	Vllaznia		
2022–2024	EP-Com Hajvalia		
2024–	Basel	7	(0)

International career^{‡}
2017	Kosovo	3	(1)
2016–	Albania	26	(4)
- * Club domestic league appearances and goals as of 13 August 2024 ‡ National team caps and goals as of 17 January 2024

Qendresa Krasniqi (born 28 June 1994) is a footballer who plays as a midfielder for Swiss Women's Super League club Basel. Born in Kosovo, she plays for the Albania national team. She also represented Kosovo in a 2017 FIFA international window.

== Club career ==
Krasniqi has played for KFF Hajvalia and Swiss club Yverdon.

== International career ==
Born in Kosovo, Krasniqi is of Albanian descent. She made her debut for Albania in an official match on 2 June 2016, shortly before Kosovo was accepted as a member of both UEFA and FIFA, so she could play for Kosovo despite her previous official appearance for Albania. In March 2017, she played for Kosovo at the Turkish Women's Cup, a friendly competition. A month later, she played three new official matches for Albania, so she became definitely cap-tied to Albania.

=== International goals ===
Scores and results list Kosovo's goal tally first

No.	Date	Venue	Opponent	Score	Result	Competition	Ref.
1	5 March 2017	Goldcity Spor Kompleksi, Antalya, Turkey	Turkey	2–2	2–4	2017 Turkish Women's Cup	

Scores and results list Albania's goal tally first

No.	Date	Venue	Opponent	Score	Result	Competition	Ref.
1	28 November 2017	Tissot Arena, Biel/Bienne, Switzerland	Switzerland	1–1	1–5	2019 FIFA Women's World Cup qualification	
2	30 November 2021	Fadil Vokrri Stadium, Pristina, Kosovo	Kosovo	3–1	3–1	2023 FIFA Women's World Cup qualification	
3	1 September 2022	Elbasan Arena, Elbasan, Albania	Poland	1–0	1–2	2023 FIFA Women's World Cup qualification	
4	22 September 2023	Loro Boriçi Stadium, Shkodër, Albania	Hungary	1–0	1–1	2023–24 UEFA Women's Nations League	

== See also ==
- List of Albania women's international footballers
- List of Kosovo women's international footballers
