= Fjolla Shala =

Kosovar footballer

Personal information
- Full name: Fjolla Shala
- Date of birth: 20 March 1993 (age 33)
- Place of birth: Kosovo
- Position: Defender

Youth career
- Leiknir Reykjavík

Senior career*
Years	Team	Apps	(Gls)
2007	Leiknir Reykjavík	6	(0)
2007	→ Fjölnir	4	(0)
2009–2011	Fylkir	39	(6)
2012–2020	Breiðablik	93	(2)
2021	Fylkir	14	(0)

International career^{‡}
2008–2009	Iceland U16	8	(1)
2008–2009	Iceland U17	4	(0)
2010–2012	Iceland U19	19	(2)
2017–2020	Kosovo	13	(0)
- * Club domestic league appearances and goals as of 11 May 2021 ‡ National team caps and goals as of 10 March 2020

Fjolla Shala (born 20 March 1993) is a footballer who last played as a defender for Icelandic club Fylkir. She has played for the Icelandic junior national teams and in 2017 debuted for the Kosovo national team.

== Early life ==
Shala was born in Kosovo but moved to Germany when she was around six months old. In 1998, when she was five years old, the family moved to Iceland. At the age of nine, she started playing football with Leiknir Reykjavík's junior teams.

== Club career ==
Shala started her senior team career with Leiknir in 2007. Later that season, she was loaned to Fjölnir where she appeared in 4 matches in the Icelandic top-tier Úrvalsdeild kvenna. In November 2008, she signed with Fylkir.

In 2012, Shala signed with Breiðablik. In May 2012, Shala broke her jaw in two places in a game after colliding with another player in the League Cup final. Despite the injury, she returned to the game after brief medical examination and played the last 20 minutes of the game. In her first start since the injury, on 24 June, she suffered a vertebral fracture after an opposing player collided and fell on her, ending her season.

She missed the 2017 season after tearing her cruciate ligaments.

After missing the 2020 season due to pregnancy, Shala signed with Fylkir in May 2021.

== National team career ==
Shala played for the Icelandic junior national teams from 2008 to 2012. In 2017, she was selected to the Kosovo national team for a friendly game against Montenegro. She appeared for the team during the UEFA Women's Euro 2021 qualifying cycle.

== Honours ==
=== Club ===
- Icelandic Champion (2): 2015, 2018
- Icelandic Cup (3): 2013, 2016, 2018
- Icelandic Super Cup (3): 2014, 2016, 2019
- Icelandic League Cup: 2019

== See also ==
- List of Kosovo women's international footballers
