= Turkish Women's Cup =

Türkiye Kadınlar Kupası
- Founded: 2017
- Region: Turkey
- Teams: 4
- Current champions: Puerto Rico (1st title)
- Most championships: France B Kosovo (2 titles)
- 2025 Turkish Women's Cup

The Turkish Women's Cup (Turkish: Türkiye Kadınlar Kupası) is the annual cup competition of women's football teams in Turkey. The tournament is also known as Alanya Gold City Cup, as the tournament is held at the Gold City in Alanya, Turkey.

It is played in late February or early March, at the same time as the Algarve Cup, the Arnold Clark Cup, the Cup of Nations, the Cyprus Women's Cup, the Istria Cup, the Pinatar Cup, the SheBelieves Cup, the Tournoi de France and the Women's Revelations Cup.

== Results ==
The list of finals:

| Season | Champions | Final Result | Runners-up |
|---|---|---|---|
| 2017 | Poland | Round-robin | Romania |
| 2018 | France B | 2–1 | Mexico |
| 2019 | France B | 7–0 | Romania |
| 2020 | Chile | Round-robin | Hungary |
| 2021 | Nigeria | Round-robin | Uzbekistan |
| 2022 | Ukraine | Round-robin | Venezuela |
| 2023 | Slovenia; Kosovo | Round-robin | South Africa; Bulgaria |
| 2024 | Kosovo | Round-robin | India |
| 2025 | Puerto Rico | Round-robin | Iran |

== Comprehensive team results by tournament ==
Champions Runners-up Third place Tournament played fully or partially on home soil

| Team | 2017 | 2018 | 2019 | 2020 | 2021 | 2022 | 2023 | 2024 | 2025 | Years |
|---|---|---|---|---|---|---|---|---|---|---|
| Belarus | – | – | – | 4^{A} | – | – | – | – | – | 1 |
| Bulgaria | – | – | – | – | – | 6th | 2nd^{B} | – | – | 2 |
| Chile | – | – | – | 1st | – | – | – | – | – | 1 |
| Equatorial Guinea | – | – | – | – | 4th | – | – | – | – | 1 |
| Estonia | – | – | – | – | – | – | 4^{B} | 3rd | 3rd | 3 |
| France B | – | 1st | 1st | – | – | – | – | – | – | 2 |
| Ghana | – | – | – | 3rd | – | – | – | – | – | 1 |
| Hong Kong | – | – | – | 5^{A} | – | – | 5^{B} | 4th | – | 3 |
| Hungary | – | – | – | 2nd | – | – | – | – | – | 1 |
| India | – | – | 6th | – | F | – | – | 2nd | – | 3 |
| Iran | – | – | – | – | – | – | – | – | 2nd | 1 |
| Jordan | – | 8th | 7th | – | – | – | WD | – | – | 2 |
| Kazakhstan | – | 10th | 5th | – | – | – | – | – | – | 2 |
| Kenya | – | – | – | 3^{B} | – | – | – | – | – | 1 |
| Kosovo | 4th | 5th | – | – | – | – | 1st^{B} | 1st | – | 4 |
| Latvia | – | 9th | – | – | – | 4th | – | – | – | 2 |
| Lithuania | – | – | – | – | – | 5th | – | – | – | 1 |
| Mexico | – | 2nd | – | – | – | – | – | – | – | 1 |
| Nigeria | – | – | – | – | 1st | – | – | – | – | 1 |
| North Macedonia | – | – | – | – | – | – | 3^{B} | – | – | 1 |
| Northern Ireland | – | 6th | 3rd | – | – | – | – | – | – | 2 |
| Northern Ireland U19 | – | – | – | 4^{B} | – | – | – | – | – | 1 |
| Poland | 1st | 4th | – | – | – | – | – | – | – | 2 |
| Puerto Rico | – | – | – | – | – | – | – | – | 1st | 1 |
| Romania | 2nd | 7th | 2nd | 4th | – | – | – | – | – | 4 |
| Russia | – | – | – | – | F | – | – | – | – | 1 |
| Serbia | – | – | – | – | F | – | – | – | – | 1 |
| Slovenia | – | – | – | – | – | – | 1st^{A} | – | – | 1 |
| South Africa | – | – | – | – | – | – | 2nd^{A} | – | – | 1 |
| Turkey | 3rd | – | – | – | – | – | WD | – | – | 1 |
| Turkmenistan | – | – | 8th | – | – | – | – | – | – | 1 |
| Ukraine | – | 3rd | – | – | F | 1st | – | – | – | 3 |
| Uzbekistan | – | – | 4th | – | 2nd | 3rd | 4^{A} | – | – | 4 |
| Venezuela | – | – | – | WD | – | 2nd | WD | – | – | 1 |
| Zambia | – | – | – | – | WD | – | 3^{A} | – | – | 1 |
| Total | 4 | 10 | 8 | 8 | 8 | 6 | 12 | 4 | 3 | — |

Notes

- ^{A} = Group A.
- ^{B} = Group B.
- ^{F} = Just played friendly matches.
- ^{WD} = Withdrew.
