= Nadjma Ali Nadjim =

French footballer (born 1994)

Personal information
- Date of birth: 19 September 1994 (age 32)
- Place of birth: Marseille, France
- Height: 1.61 m (5 ft 3 in)
- Position: Forward

Team information
- Current team: Saint-Étienne
- Number: 19

Youth career
- 2011–2012: Lyon

Senior career*
| Years | Team | Apps | (Gls) |
| 2009 | Lyon B | 5 | (9) |
| 2013–2017 | Grenoble (Note: Known until the 2014–15 season as Claix and during the 2015–16 season as Grenoble Claix.) | 39 | (38) |
| 2017–2018 | Bordeaux | 22 | (5) |
| 2018–2019 | Fleury | 15 | (1) |
| 2019 | Marseille | 7 | (0) |
| 2020 | Nancy | 2 | (1) |
| 2020–2021 | Thonon Évian | 4 | (3) |
| 2021–2024 | Le Havre | 53 | (23) |
| 2024– | Saint-Étienne | 2 | (0) |

International career
| 2018 | France U23 | 4 | (2) |
| 2017 | France | 1 | (0) |
- * Club domestic league appearances and goals as of 2 October 2025

Nadjma Ali Nadjim (born 19 September 1994) is a French footballer who plays as a forward for Division 1 Féminine club Saint-Étienne. She has been a member of the France women's national team. She also holds Comorian citizenship.
