= KFF Intelektualet =

Women's football club in Kosovo

- Full name: Klubi Futbollistik për Femra Intelektualet
- Founded: 2010; 15 years ago
- Ground: Gjilan City Stadium
- Capacity: 8,900
- League: Kosovo First League
- 2021–22: Kosovo League, 12th of 13 (relegated)

KFF Intelektualet (Albanian: Klubi Futbollistik për Femra Intelektualet) is a women's football club based in Gjilan, Kosovo. The club competes in Kosovo Women's Football League which is the top tier of women's football in the country. Their home ground is the Gjilan City Stadium which has a seating capacity of 8,900.

== See also ==
- List of football clubs in Kosovo
