= KFF Feronikeli =

Women's football club in Kosovo

- Full name: Klubi Futbollistik për Femra Feronikeli
- Founded: 2006; 19 years ago
- Ground: Rexhep Rexhepi Stadium
- Capacity: 6,000
- League: Kosovo First League (returned)
- 2019–20 (last): Kosovo League, 2nd of 12 (withdraw)

KFF Feronikeli (Albanian: Klubi Futbollistik për Femra Feronikeli) is a women's football club based in Drenas, Kosovo. The club competes in Kosovo Women's Football League which is the top tier of women's football in the country. Their home ground is the Rexhep Rexhepi Stadium which has a seating capacity of 6,000.

== Honours ==
- Kosovo Women's Football League:
  - Runners-Up: 2018-19,

== See also ==
- List of football clubs in Kosovo
