= KFF Vizioni =

Women's football club in Kosovo

- Full name: Klubi Futbollistik për Femra Vizioni
- Founded: 2004; 21 years ago
- Ground: Ismet Shabani Stadium
- Capacity: 2,000
- League: Kosovo First League
- 2021–22: Kosovo League, 9th of 13 (relegated)

KFF Vizioni (Albanian: Klubi Futbollistik për Femra Vizioni) is a women's football club based in Ferizaj, Kosovo. The club competes in Kosovo Women's Football League which is the top tier of women's football in the country. Their home ground is the Ismet Shabani Stadium which has a seating capacity of 500.

== See also ==
- List of football clubs in Kosovo
