= Liridona Syla =

Kosovar footballer

Personal information
- Date of birth: 5 February 1986 (age 40)
- Place of birth: Skenderaj, SFR Yugoslavia
- Position: Defender

Team information
- Current team: Mitrovica
- Number: 5

Senior career*
Years	Team	Apps	(Gls)
–2015	Prishtina		
2015–2017	Hajvalia		
2017–2018	Mitrovica		
2018	Drenica		
2018–	Mitrovica		

International career^{‡}
2017–	Kosovo	29	(4)
Volleyball career
Career
Years	Team
2006–2011	Skenderaj
- * Club domestic league appearances and goals as of 19:42, 30 August 2019 (UTC) ‡ National team caps and goals as of 19:42, 30 August 2019 (UTC)

Liridona Syla (born 5 February 1986) is a Kosovan professional footballer who plays as a defender for Kosovan club Mitrovica and the Kosovo national team.

== Club career ==
=== Hajvalia ===
==== 2016–17 season ====
Syla opened the 2017–18 season by playing in the qualifying round in the 2016–17 UEFA Women's Champions League, she played in the opening game of the 2016–17 UEFA Women's Champions League campaign against PAOK in a 1–1 draw.

== International career ==
On 27 February 2017, Syla was named as part of the Kosovo squad for 2017 Turkish Women's Cup. On 1 March 2017, she made her debut with Kosovo in a match against Poland after coming on as a substitute.

=== International goals ===
No.	Date	Venue	Opponent	Score	Result	Competition	Ref.
1.	30 August 2019	Fadil Vokrri Stadium, Pristina, Kosovo	Turkey	2–0	2–0	UEFA Women's Euro 2021 qualifying	
2.	11 April 2021	Petar Miloševski Training Centre, Skopje, North Macedonia	North Macedonia	1–0	1–0	Friendly	
3.	26 October 2021	Vazgen Sargsyan Republican Stadium, Yerevan, Armenia	Armenia	1–0	1–0	2023 FIFA Women's World Cup qualification	
4.	25 November 2021	Fadil Vokrri Stadium, Pristina, Kosovo	Poland	1–0	1–2	2023 FIFA Women's World Cup qualification	

== See also ==
- List of Kosovo women's international footballers
