= Women's Football Superleague of Kosovo =

Women's top division association football league in Kosovo

- Organising body: FFK Competitions Commission
- Founded: 2010; 16 years ago; 4 August 2022; 4 years ago (current form)
- First season: 2010–11
- Country: Kosovo
- Confederation: UEFA
- Number of clubs: Various by season, currently 8
- Level on pyramid: 1
- Relegation to: Women's First Football League of Kosovo
- Domestic cup: Kosovo Women's Cup
- International cup: UEFA Women's Champions League
- Current champions: Mitrovica (7th title) (2025–26)
- Most championships: Mitrovica (7 titles)
- Broadcaster: FIFA+
- Website: Official website
- Current: 2026–27

The Women's Football Superleague of Kosovo (Albanian: Superliga e Futbollit për Femra të Kosovës), also known as the SIGURIA Women's Superleague (Albanian: SIGURIA Superliga e Femrave) for sponsorship reasons, is the top women's association football division of the women's football league system in Kosovo. The league is organised by the Football Federation of Kosovo (FFK) through its competitions commission and, since a 2022 reorganisation, has operated as an eight-team national championship at the apex of a multi-tier women's league structure.

The champions qualify for the qualifying rounds of the UEFA Women's Champions League, subject to meeting UEFA licensing criteria, giving Kosovar clubs a pathway into European competition. Mitrovica are the most successful club in the league's history, having won six titles, while sides such as Kosova VR Prishtinë, Hajvalia and EP-COM Hajvalia have also claimed national championships.

== History ==
=== Foundation and early years ===
Organised women's league football in Kosovo began in 2010, when the FFK established the Kosovo Women's Football League (Albanian: Liga e Futbollit për Femra të Kosovës) as the first nationwide competition for women's clubs. The inaugural 2010–11 season was won by Kosova Prishtinë, who repeated their success the following year, before other clubs from Pristina and elsewhere in Kosovo began to challenge for the title. During this period the league's format and number of participating teams varied, reflecting the developing infrastructure of women's football in the country.

Through the 2010s the league remained the only senior women's competition at national level. Pristina-based sides, including different incarnations of Kosova and Prishtina, dominated the early seasons, before Hajvalia and later Mitrovica emerged as the leading forces.

=== UEFA eligibility and European participation ===
Kosovo's admission to UEFA and FIFA in 2016 enabled its women's champions to enter the UEFA Women's Champions League for the first time, beginning with the 2016–17 season. Hajvalia became the first Kosovar women's club to take part in the competition when they entered the qualifying round that year, playing against teams from Cyprus, Greece and the Faroe Islands.

In 2017–18 Mitrovica won the domestic title for the first time and subsequently became the second Kosovar representative in the Women's Champions League, making their European debut in the 2018–19 qualifying round. Since then Mitrovica have appeared regularly in UEFA competition, reaching the round of 32 in 2019–20, while champions EP-COM Hajvalia have also participated in the qualifying rounds.

=== Reorganisation as Superleague ===
In August 2022 the FFK approved a new structure for the women's game, creating a two-tier league system and rebranding the top division as the Women's Football Superleague of Kosovo (Albanian: Superliga e Futbollit për Femra të Kosovës). Under this reform, the eight highest-ranked clubs were placed in the Superleague, while the remaining teams formed the newly established Women's First Football League of Kosovo, with promotion and relegation between the two tiers.

The same reform modernised competition regulations and match organisation, aligning them more closely with those used in the men's Football Superleague. It also formalised the pathway from youth and regional competitions into the national league structure and clarified the licensing criteria for clubs seeking to play at Superleague level.

== Competition format ==
Since the 2022–23 season the Women's Football Superleague has consisted of eight clubs drawn from across Kosovo. The exact number of rounds has varied by campaign, but the competition is played as a league system in which each team faces the others multiple times during the season. Teams are awarded three points for a win, one for a draw and none for a loss. Rankings in the table are determined by total points gained, followed where necessary by goal difference and goals scored.

At the end of each season the lowest-placed clubs are relegated to the Women's First Football League of Kosovo, while the best-placed teams from the second tier gain promotion to the Superleague, either directly or via promotion play-offs, depending on the regulations adopted for that season. The league champions qualify for the qualifying rounds of the UEFA Women's Champions League, representing Kosovo in European competition, provided they obtain a UEFA licence from the FFK.

== Clubs (2022–23) ==
Locations of the Kosovo Women's Football League teams

Note: Table lists in alphabetical order.

#	Club	Location
1	Bazeli	Kaçanik
2	Dukagjini	Klina
3	EP-COM Hajvalia	Hajvalia
4	Jakova	Gjakova
5	Kosova VR Prishtinë	Pristina
6	Llapi	Podujevë
7	Malisheva	Malisheva
8	Mitrovica	Mitrovica

== Season standings ==
=== Current season ===
Pos	Team	Pld	W	D	L	GF	GA	GD	Pts	Qualification
1	Bazeli	0	0	0	0	0	0	0	0	Qualification for the Champions League qualifying round
2	Dukagjini	0	0	0	0	0	0	0	0	
3	EP-COM Hajvalia	0	0	0	0	0	0	0	0	
4	Jakova	0	0	0	0	0	0	0	0	
5	Kosova VR Prishtinë	0	0	0	0	0	0	0	0	
6	Llapi	0	0	0	0	0	0	0	0	
7	Malisheva	0	0	0	0	0	0	0	0	Qualification for the relegation play-offs
8	Mitrovica	0	0	0	0	0	0	0	0	Relegation to Women's First Football League of Kosovo

Updated to match(es) played on unknown. Source: Soccerway

=== Previous seasons ===
Previous seasons as Kosovo Women's Football League

2021–22

Pos	Team	Pld	W	D	L	GF	GA	GD	Pts	Qualification
1	EP-COM Hajvalia (C)	24	23	1	0	163	10	+153	70	Qualification for the Champions League qualifying round
2	Mitrovica	24	22	1	1	193	2	+191	67	
3	Kosova VR Prishtinë	24	18	2	4	123	20	+103	56	
4	Malisheva	24	16	2	6	145	49	+96	50	
5	Llapi	24	15	3	6	101	41	+60	48	
6	Dukagjini	24	14	0	10	108	51	+57	42	
7	Bazeli	24	10	3	11	68	62	+6	33	
8	Jakova	24	10	0	14	51	108	−57	30	
9	Vizioni (R)	24	6	3	15	40	80	−40	21	Relegation to Women's First Football League of Kosovo
10	Liria (R)	24	6	3	15	30	95	−65	21	Relegation to Women's First Football League of Kosovo
11	Presingu (R)	24	4	2	18	34	148	−114	14	Relegation to Women's First Football League of Kosovo
12	Intelektualet (R)	24	2	0	22	28	202	−174	6	Relegation to Women's First Football League of Kosovo
13	Heroinat (R)	24	0	0	24	3	219	−216	0	Relegation to Women's First Football League of Kosovo

Source: Soccerway
(C) Champions; (R) Relegated

2020–21

Pos	Team	Pld	W	D	L	GF	GA	GD	Pts	Qualification
1	Mitrovica (C)	20	19	1	0	165	4	+161	58	Qualification for the Champions League qualifying round
2	Kosova VR Prishtinë	20	16	2	2	75	28	+47	50	
3	A&N	20	15	2	3	102	11	+91	47	
4	Malisheva	20	12	1	7	72	45	+27	37	
5	Jakova	20	10	3	7	56	49	+7	33	
6	Llapi	20	8	3	9	50	46	+4	27	
7	Bazeli	20	7	3	10	45	72	−27	24	
8	Intelektualet	20	5	2	13	37	122	−85	17	
9	Vizioni	20	4	3	13	29	69	−40	15	
10	Kijeva	20	3	0	17	15	103	−88	9	
11	Liria	20	1	0	19	7	104	−97	3	

Source: Soccerway
(C) Champions

2019–20

Pos	Team	Pld	W	D	L	GF	GA	GD	Pts	Qualification
1	Mitrovica (Note: Mitrovica was declared champion after winning the supplementary match against Feronikeli.) (C)	12	11	1	0	106	1	+105	34	Qualification for the Champions League first qualifying round
2	Feronikeli	12	10	1	1	65	4	+61	31	Club was withdraw from the league after losing the supplementary match
3	Malisheva	11	9	0	2	42	25	+17	27	
4	A&N	11	8	0	3	41	22	+19	24	
5	Bazeli	11	5	0	6	29	56	−27	15	
6	Kosova (P)	11	5	0	6	21	24	−3	15	
7	Llapi	11	4	0	7	25	31	−6	12	
8	Intelektualet	11	3	0	8	16	57	−41	9	
9	Vizioni	11	2	0	9	19	51	−32	6	
10	Jakova	10	2	0	8	17	45	−28	6	
11	Liria	11	1	0	10	5	70	−65	3	
12	Drenica	5	0	0	5	2	32	−30	0	Club was withdraw from the league

Source: Soccerway
(C) Champions
Notes:

2018–19

Pos	Team	Pld	W	D	L	GF	GA	GD	Pts	Qualification
1	Mitrovica (C)	24	22	1	1	263	5	+258	67	Qualification for the Champions League qualifying round
2	Feronikeli	24	21	1	2	149	11	+138	64	
3	Malisheva	24	18	2	4	91	27	+64	56	
4	Dukagjini	24	16	1	7	64	47	+17	49	
5	Kosova (P)	24	15	3	6	65	32	+33	48	
6	Liria	24	12	1	11	57	72	−15	37	
7	Bazeli	24	10	1	13	52	75	−23	31	
8	Llapi	24	9	1	14	51	73	−22	28	
9	Intelektualet	24	8	2	14	55	133	−78	26	
10	Vizioni	24	7	1	16	46	72	−26	22	
11	Jakova	24	6	1	17	29	137	−108	19	
12	Ulpiana	24	4	1	19	26	120	−94	13	
13	Drenica	24	0	0	24	13	157	−144	0	

Source: Soccerway
(C) Champions

2017–18

Pos	Team	Pld	W	D	L	GF	GA	GD	Pts	Qualification
1	Mitrovica (Note: Mitrovica was declared champion after winning the supplementary match against Hajvalia.) (C)	25	23	2	0	208	7	+201	71	Qualification for the Champions League qualifying round
2	Hajvalia	25	22	2	1	260	11	+249	68	
3	Dukagjini	24	18	1	5	100	51	+49	55	
4	Kosova (P)	24	18	1	5	83	34	+49	55	
5	Llapi	24	12	1	11	70	63	+7	37	
6	Malisheva	24	11	3	10	67	80	−13	36	
7	Vizioni	24	11	1	12	89	98	−9	34	
8	Bazeli	24	9	2	13	41	80	−39	29	
9	Intelektualet	24	7	2	15	64	118	−54	23	
10	Ulpiana	24	7	1	16	40	132	−92	22	
11	Liria	24	4	2	18	49	142	−93	14	
12	13 Qershori	24	4	2	18	39	161	−122	14	
13	Drenica	24	0	2	22	8	141	−133	2	

Source: Soccerway
(C) Champions
Notes:

2016–17

Pos	Team	Pld	W	D	L	GF	GA	GD	Pts	Qualification
1	Hajvalia (C)	18	18	0	0	138	3	+135	54	Qualification for the Champions League qualifying round
2	Mitrovica	18	15	0	3	67	12	+55	45	
3	Intelektualet	18	11	2	5	85	34	+51	35	
4	Dukagjini	18	10	2	6	37	42	−5	32	
5	Llapi	18	8	3	7	47	37	+10	27	
6	Kosova (P)	18	6	4	8	33	44	−11	22	
7	Bazeli	18	5	1	12	21	73	−52	16	
8	Vizioni	18	4	0	14	24	72	−48	12	
9	13 Qershori	18	3	2	13	25	65	−40	11	
10	Ulpiana	18	3	0	15	17	112	−95	9	

Source: Soccerway
(C) Champions

== Superleague clubs in European competitions ==
=== UEFA Champions League ===
Hajvalia secured qualification by entering at the qualifying round in the UEFA Women's Champions League for the first time in the 2016–17 season. Besides Hajvalia, Mitrovica have also competed in the UEFA Women's Champions League since the 2018–19 season, entering during the qualifying round.

Season	Team	Round	Opponent	Home	Away	Agg.
2016–17	Hajvalia	QR	(Greece) PAOK	1–1		
2016–17	Hajvalia	QR	(Cyprus) Apollon Limassol (H)	0–1		
2016–17	Hajvalia	QR	(Faroe Islands) KÍ Klaksvík	1–1		
2017–18	Hajvalia	QR	(Hungary) MTK Hungária (H)	0–2		
2017–18	Hajvalia	QR	(Kazakhstan) BIIK Kazygurt	0–1		
2017–18	Hajvalia	QR	(Portugal) Sporting CP	1–4		
2018–19	Mitrovica	QR	(Hungary) MTK Hungária (H)	1–6		
2018–19	Mitrovica	QR	(Czech Republic) Slavia Praha	0–4		
2018–19	Mitrovica	QR	(Turkey) Ataşehir Belediyespor	1–6		
2019–20	Mitrovica	QR	(Romania) Olimpia Cluj	1–2		
2019–20	Mitrovica	QR	(Bulgaria) NSA Sofia	0–2		
2019–20	Mitrovica	QR	(Montenegro) Breznica (H)	0–1		
2019–20	Mitrovica	R32	(Germany) VfL Wolfsburg	0–10	0–5	0–15
2020–21	Mitrovica	1Q	(Austria) St. Pölten	0–2		
2021–22	Mitrovica	QR	(Norway) Vålerenga	0–5		
2021–22	Mitrovica	QR	(Moldova) Agarista Anenii Noi	3–0		
2022–23	EP-COM Hajvalia	QR	(Portugal) Benfica	0–9		
2022–23	EP-COM Hajvalia	QR	(Moldova) Agarista Anenii Noi	7–0		
2023–24	EP-COM Hajvalia	QR	(Albania) Vllaznia	2–4		
2023–24	EP-COM Hajvalia	QR	(Turkey) Fomget Gençlik	0–6		
2024–25	Mitrovica	QR	(Romania) Farul Constanța	0–4		
2025–26	Mitrovica	QR	(Northern Ireland) Cliftonville	1–3 (a.e.t.)		

== Champions ==
As of 23 May 2026

Kosovo Women's Football League
Season	Club	Location
2010–11	Kosova Prishtinë	Pristina
2011–12	Kosova Prishtinë	Pristina
2012–13	Prishtina	Pristina
2013–14	Prishtina	Pristina
2014–15	Prishtina	Pristina
2015–16	Hajvalia	Hajvalia
2016–17	Hajvalia	Hajvalia
2017–18	Mitrovica	Mitrovica
2018–19	Mitrovica	Mitrovica
2019–20	Mitrovica	Mitrovica
2020–21	Mitrovica	Mitrovica
2021–22	EP-COM Hajvalia	Hajvalia

Women's Football Superleague of Kosovo
Season	Club	Location
2022–23	EP-COM Hajvalia	Hajvalia
2023–24	Mitrovica	Mitrovica
2024–25	Mitrovica	Mitrovica
2025–26	Mitrovica	Mitrovica

== Media and sponsorship ==
From its creation in 2010 until 2022 the competition was known simply as the Kosovo Women's Football League. Following the 2022 reorganisation its official name became Women's Football Superleague of Kosovo, with the FFK also beginning to sell naming rights to commercial sponsors for use in marketing and broadcasting.

Since the early 2020s the league has carried the name of a title sponsor. Between 2022 and 2025 it was branded SIGAL Women's Superleague (Albanian: SIGAL Superliga e Femrave) after an agreement with insurance company SIGAL Uniqa Group Austria, while from 2025 the championship has been marketed as the SIGURIA Women's Superleague (Albanian: SIGURIA Superliga e Femrave). Selected matches are streamed internationally on the digital platform FIFA+.
