= KFF A&N =

Football club in Kosovo

- Full name: Klubi Futbollistik për Femra A&N
- Founded: 2017; 8 years ago
- Dissolved: 2021
- Ground: Boka-Boka Studium, Korishë
- Capacity: 1,500
- League: None
- 2020–21 (last): Kosovo League, 3rd of 11

KFF A&N (Albanian: Klubi Futbollistik për Femra A&N) was a women's football club based in Prizren, Kosovo. The club competed in Kosovo League which is the top tier of women's football in the country. Their home ground was the Boka-Boka Studium which has a seating capacity of 1,500.

== See also ==
- List of football clubs in Kosovo
