= KFF Kosova VR Prishtinë =

Women's football club in Kosovo

Kosova VR Prishtinë
- Full name: Klubi Futbollistik për Femra Kosova Vranjevc Prishtinë
- Nickname(s): Hotelieret (Hoteliers)
- Short name: KFKP
- Founded: 4 October 2002; 22 years ago as KFF Kosova Prishtinë; 22 January 2020; 5 years ago as KFF Kosova VR Prishtinë
- Ground: Bërnica Synthetic Grass Stadium
- Capacity: 1,500
- President: Visar Dauti
- League: Kosovo Superleague
- 2024–2026: 6th

KFF Kosova VR Prishtinë (Albanian: Klubi Futbollistik për Femra Kosova Vranjevc Prishtinë), commonly referred to as Kosova VR Prishtinë and colloquially known as Kosova VR is a women's football club based in Vranjevc, Pristina, Kosovo. It is the women's section of KF Kosova VR Prishtinë. The club play in the Kosovo Women's Football League, which is the top tier of football in the country.

== Honours ==
KFF Kosova VR Prishtinë honours
Type	Competition	Titles	Seasons/Years
Domestic	Kosovo Women's Football League	2	2010–11, 2011–12
