= KFF Mitrovica =

Women's football club in Kosovo

Mitrovica
- Full name: Klubi Futbollistik për Femra Mitrovica
- Founded: 2004; 22 years ago
- President: Hajrullah Haxhiu
- Manager: Seid Onbashi
- League: Kosovo Superleague
- 2024–2025: Champions

KFF Mitrovica (Albanian: Klubi Futbollistik për Femra Mitrovica), commonly known as Mitrovica is a women's football club based in Mitrovica, Kosovo. The club play in the Kosovo Women's Football League, which is the top tier of football in the country. Mitrovica is the most successful club in Kosovo.

== History ==
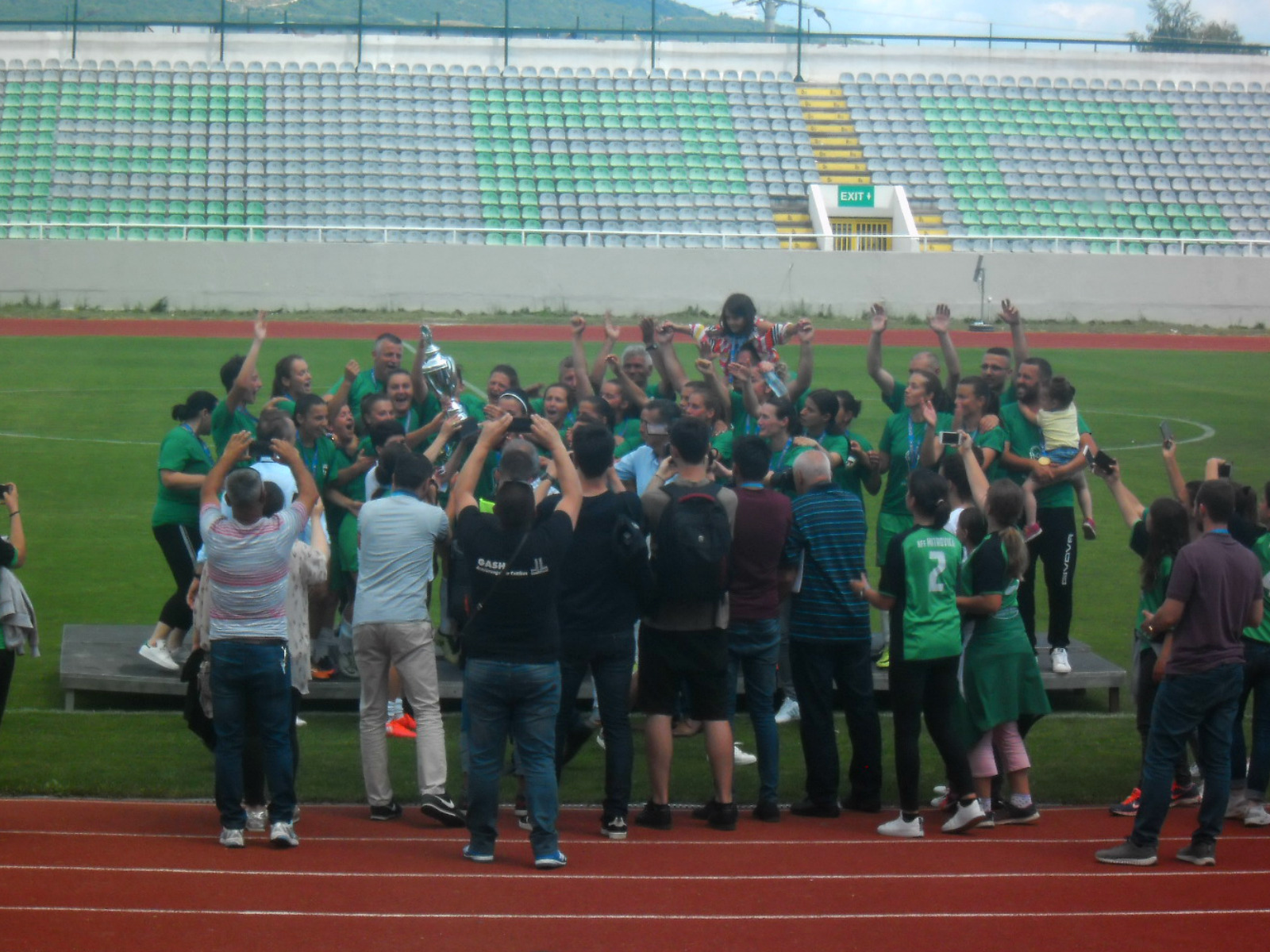
Mitrovica, the winner of 2017–18 Kosovan Women's Cup

In the 2017–18 season they were crowned champions for the first time in the club's history.

== Stadium ==
The club plays its home games in three stadiums as in:

1. Adem Jashari Olympic Stadium (Albanian: Stadiumi Olimpik Adem Jashari), a multi-purpose stadium in Mitrovica, Kosovo. The stadium has a capacity of around 35,000 people or 18,500 seated and is named after one of the founders of the Kosovo Liberation Army, Adem Jashari.
2. Riza Lushta Stadium (Albanian: Stadiumi Riza Lushta), a multi-purpose stadium in Mitrovica, Kosovo. The stadium has a capacity of 12,000 people all seater and is named after the KF Trepça's former player Riza Lushta.
3. Xhevat Jusufi-Xheki Synthetic Stadium (Albanian: Stadiumi Sintetik Xhevat Jusufi-Xheki), a football stadium in Mitrovica, Kosovo. The stadium is named after the Lushta Football School's former youth player Xhevat Jusufi.

== Honours ==
KFF Mitrovica honours
Type	Competition	Titles	Seasons/Years
Domestic	Kosovo Women's Football League	6	2017–18, 2018–19, 2019–20, 2020–21, 2023–24, 2024–25
Domestic	Kosovan Women's Cup	7	2017–18, 2018–19, 2019–20, 2020–21, 2021–22, 2022–2023, 2023–2024

== Players ==
=== Current squad ===
As of 22 January 2021

Note: Flags indicate national team as defined under FIFA eligibility rules; some limited exceptions apply. Players may hold more than one non-FIFA nationality.

No.	Pos.	Nation	Player
1	GK	ALB	Viona Rexhepi
2	DF	ALB	Endrina Elezaj
3	DF	KOS	Fatbardha Osmani
4	DF	RSA	Zanele Portia Nhlapho
5	DF	KOS	Liridona Syla
6	DF	ALB	Gresa Haziri
7	FW	KOS	Qendresa Bajra
8	FW	ALB	Ambra Gjegji
9	FW	KOS	Kaltrina Biqkaj
10	MF	KOS	Blerta Shala
11	FW	KOS	Edona Kryeziu
12	GK	KOS	Florentina Kolgeci

No.	Pos.	Nation	Player
13	DF	KOS	Albulena Fejza
14	FW	RSA	Andisiwe Mgcoyi
15	MF	KOS	Doruntina Imeri
16	MF	KOS	Marigonë Tahiri
17	DF	KOS	Valentina Tërnava
18	FW	KOS	Valentina Latifi
20	FW	KOS	Donjeta Halilaj
21	FW	KOS	Egzona Zeka
97	GK	KOS	Diellza Musa
—	DF	KOS	Agnesa Gashi
—	MF	KOS	Erjona Emërllahu

== Personnel ==
As of 12 January 2021

Position	Name
Head coach	(Albania) Suada Jashari
Assistant coach	(Kosovo) Veton Çitaku
Assistant coach	(Kosovo) Ramadan Hyseni
Goalkeeping coach	(Kosovo) Enes Shosholli
Doctor(s)	(Kosovo) Lirije Fazliu
Doctor(s)	(Kosovo) Sabit Hajra
Board members
Office	Name
President	(Kosovo) Hajrullah Haxhiu
Sports director	(Kosovo) Adnan Ademi

== KFF Mitrovica in Europe ==
KFF Mitrovica will compete in the UEFA Women's Champions League for the first time in the 2018–19 season, entering at the qualifying round. On 7 August 2018, KFF Mitrovica made his debut on UEFA Women's Champions League with a 1–6 away defeat against MTK Hungária.

On 7 August 2019, KFF Mitrovica won their first ever match in UEFA Women's Champions League by defeating Olimpia Cluj, 1–2 and became the first Kosovan side to win a UEFA Women's Champions League match. KFF Mitrovica after completing the qualifying round with three wins, secured the qualification for the round of 32, where he will face the German giants VfL Wolfsburg.

Season	Competition	Round	Opponent	Home	Away	Agg.
2018–19	UEFA Women's; Champions League	QR	(Hungary) MTK Hungária (H)	1–6		
2018–19	UEFA Women's; Champions League	QR	(Czech Republic) Slavia Praha	0–4		
2018–19	UEFA Women's; Champions League	QR	(Turkey) Ataşehir Belediyespor	1–6		
2019–20	UEFA Women's; Champions League	QR	(Romania) Olimpia Cluj	2–1		
2019–20	UEFA Women's; Champions League	QR	(Bulgaria) NSA Sofia	2–0		
2019–20	UEFA Women's; Champions League	QR	(Montenegro) Breznica (H)	1–0		
2019–20	UEFA Women's; Champions League	R32	(Germany) VfL Wolfsburg	0–10	0–5	0–15
2020–21	UEFA Women's; Champions League	QR	(Austria) St. Pölten	0–2		
2021–22	UEFA Women's; Champions League	QR	(Norway) Vålerenga	0–5		
2021–22	UEFA Women's; Champions League	QR	(Moldova) Agarista Anenii Noi	3–0		
2024–25	UEFA Women's; Champions League	QR	(Romania) Farul Constanța	0–4		
2026–27	UEFA Women's; Champions League	1QR	(Moldova) Zimbru Chișinău	10–0		
2026–27	UEFA Women's; Champions League	1QR	(Bulgaria) Ludogorets Razgrad	2–0		
2026–27	UEFA Women's; Champions League	2QR	(Norway) Brann			
2026–27	UEFA Women's; Champions League	2QR	(Hungary) Ferencváros or (Greece) PAOK			

== Notes and references ==
=== Notes ===
1. Mitrovica was declared champion after winning the supplementary match against Hajvalia.
2. Mitrovica was declared champion after winning the supplementary match against Feronikeli.
