= List of Kosovo women's international footballers =

This is a list of Kosovo women's international footballers who have been capped at least once for the Kosovo women's national football team.

== Players ==
Name	Caps	Goals	National team years	Club(s)
Flutura Agaj	2	0	2019–	(Switzerland) Schlieren
Flaka Asllanaj	1	0	2019–	(Germany) Duisburg II
Viola Avduli	4	0	2020–	(Switzerland) Zürich U21
Qendresa Bajra	4	0	2017–	(Kosovo) Mitrovica
Antigona Behluli	2	0	2017	–
Verona Berisha	5	0	2020–	(Kosovo) Mitrovica
Kaltrina Biqkaj	13	1	2017–	(Kosovo) Mitrovica
Marigona Durguti	4	0	2017	–
Leonora Ejupi	5	0	–	(Germany) Arminia Bielefeld
Erjona Emërllahu	3	0	–	(Kosovo) A&N
Agnesa Gashi	3	0	–	(Kosovo) A&N
Fitore Govori	3	0	2017	–
Donika Grajqevci	3	0	–	(Germany) Carl Zeiss Jena
Donjeta Halilaj	10	0	–	(Kosovo) Mitrovica
Donjeta Haxha	3	0	2017	–
Besarta Hisenaj	5	0	–	(Germany) Andernach
Mimoza Islami	1	0	2017	–
Blerta Kaqiu	2	0	2017	–
Edona Kastrati	6	0	–	(Italy) Vicenza
Fatbardha Kastrati	1	0	–	–
Feride Kastrati	6	0	2017–	(Albania) Apolonia Fier
Qendresa Krasniqi	3	1	2017	–
Florentina Kolgeci	10	0	2017–	(Kosovo) Mitrovica
Edona Kryeziu	10	0	2017–	(Kosovo) Mitrovica
Ilfete Kryeziu	1	0	2017	–
Besarta Leci	5	0	–	(Germany) Sindelfingen
Valentina Limani	8	0	2017–2020	Retired
Loreta Lulaj	3	0	–	(Germany) Ingolstadt II
Gentiana Lushtaku	2	0	2017	–
Erëleta Memeti	8	0	–	(Germany) Freiburg
Antigona Miftari	1	0	2017	–
Lumbardha Misini	2	0	–	(Kosovo) Vizioni
Besmira Morina	2	0	2017	–
Blerina Musa	4	1	2017	–
Diellza Musa	1	0	2017	–
Fleta Musaj	2	0	–	(Kosovo) A&N
Arta Rama	1	0	2017	–
Fatlinda Ramaj	1	0	–	(Kosovo) A&N
Besjana Reçica	4	0	–	(Germany) Recklinghausen
Agnesa Rexha	4	2	2017	–
Anjeza Rexhepi	2	0	–	(Kosovo) A&N
Argnesa Rexhepi	3	0	–	(Switzerland) Zürich U21
Blerta Shala	14	1	2017–	(Kosovo) Mitrovica
Fjolla Shala	5	0	–	(Iceland) Breiðablik
Blerta Smaili	2	0	–	(Germany) Sindelfingen
Alberina Syla	2	0	–	(Germany) Eintracht Frankfurt III
Liridona Syla	11	1	–	(Kosovo) Mitrovica
Marigonë Tahiri	5	0	–	(Kosovo) Mitrovica
Laureta Temaj	1	0	–	(Germany) Alberweiler
Modesta Uka	7	3	–	(Austria) Sturm Graz
Egzona Zeka	2	0	2017	(Kosovo) Mitrovica

== See also ==
- Kosovo women's national football team
