= KFF Hajvalia =

Kosovo football club

Hajvalia
- Full name: Klubi Futbollistik për Femra Hajvalia
- Nickname: Arushat (Bears)
- Short name: FCH
- Founded: 2015; 11 years ago
- Dissolved: 2018; 8 years ago
- Ground: Hajvalia Stadium
- Capacity: 2,000
- League: None
- 2017–18 (last): Kosovo League, 2nd of 13
- Website: http://fchajvalia.com/
Home colours	Away colours

KFF Hajvalia (Albanian: Klubi Futbollistik për Femra Hajvalia), commonly known as Hajvalia was a women's football club based in village Hajvalia of Pristina, Kosovo that folded in summer 2018. It is the women's section of KF Hajvalia. The club last played in the Kosovo Women's Football League, which is the top tier of football in the country.

== History ==
=== Withdrawal from competitions ===
On 13 January 2018, Hajvalia was withdrawal from competitions due to the lack of stadium and the huge expenses.

=== Return in competitions ===
On 26 January 2018, Rrahim Pacolli with the aim of return of Hajvalia in competitions, he took running the club and took over the obligations of technical staff and players for the next four months.

== Honours ==
KFF Hajvalia honours
Type	Competition	Titles	Seasons/Years
Domestic	Kosovo Women's Football League	3	2015–16, 2016–17, 2021-22,
Domestic	Kosovan Women's Cup	3	2015–16, 2016–17, 2021-22,

== Players ==
=== 2017–18 UEFA Women's Champions League squad ===
As of 25 August 2017

Note: Flags indicate national team as defined under FIFA eligibility rules; some limited exceptions apply. Players may hold more than one non-FIFA nationality.

No.	Pos.	Nation	Player
1	GK	USA	Audrey Baldwin
3	DF	ALB	Arbenita Curraj
5	DF	ALB	Rabie Tota
6	DF	KOS	Donjeta Haxha
7	MF	KOS	Qendresa Bajra
8	MF	KOS	Feride Kastrati
9	FW	ALB	Zylfije Bajramaj (captain)
10	MF	KOS	Blerina Musa
11	FW	KOS	Arta Rama
15	DF	LTU	Ugnė Šmitaitė
17	GK	KOS	Malsore Halili

No.	Pos.	Nation	Player
18	MF	ALB	Qendresa Krasniqi
20	MF	KOS	Blerta Shala
21	MF	KOS	Egzona Gashi
22	FW	ALB	Antigona Behluli
33	FW	ALB	Ambra Gjergji
38	FW	KOS	Liridona Gashi
55	MF	KOS	Donjeta Halilaj
88	DF	KOS	Antigona Miftari
97	GK	KOS	Diellza Musa
99	DF	ALB	Endrina Elezaj

== KFF Hajvalia in Europe ==
KFF Hajvalia will compete in the UEFA Women's Champions League for the first time in the 2016–17 season, entering at the qualifying round.

Season	Competition	Round	Opponent	Result
2016–17	UEFA Women's Champions League	QR	(Greece) PAOK	1–1
2016–17	UEFA Women's Champions League	QR	(Cyprus) Apollon Limassol (H)	0–1
2016–17	UEFA Women's Champions League	QR	(Faroe Islands) KÍ Klaksvík	1–1
2017–18	UEFA Women's Champions League	QR	(Hungary) MTK Hungária (H)	0–2
2017–18	UEFA Women's Champions League	QR	(Kazakhstan) BIIK Kazygurt	0–1
2017–18	UEFA Women's Champions League	QR	(Portugal) Sporting CP	1–4
