= 2019–20 UEFA Women's Champions League qualifying round =

Tournament details
- Dates: 7–13 August 2019
- Teams: 40 (from 40 associations)

Tournament statistics
- Matches played: 60
- Goals scored: 282 (4.7 per match)
- Attendance: 14,763 (246 per match)
- Top scorer(s): (Nigeria) Emueje Ogbiagbevha (Iceland) Berglind Björg Þorvaldsdóttir (6 goals)

The 2019–20 UEFA Women's Champions League qualifying round was played between 7 and 13 August 2019. A total of 40 teams competed in the qualifying round to decide 10 of the 32 places in the knockout phase of the 2019–20 UEFA Women's Champions League.

== Draw ==
The draw of the qualifying round was held at the UEFA headquarters in Nyon, Switzerland on 21 June 2019, 13:30 CEST. The 40 teams were allocated into four seeding positions based on their UEFA women's club coefficients at the beginning of the season. They were drawn into ten groups of four containing one team from each of the four seeding positions. First, the ten teams which were pre-selected as hosts were drawn from their own designated pot and allocated to their respective group as per their seeding positions. Next, the remaining 30 teams were drawn from their respective pot which are allocated according to their seeding positions.

Based on the decision taken by the UEFA Emergency Panel at its meeting in Paris on 9 June 2016, teams from Serbia or Bosnia and Herzegovina would not be drawn against teams from Kosovo.

Below are the 40 teams which participated in the qualifying round (with their 2019 UEFA women's club coefficients, which take into account their performance in European competitions from 2014–15 to 2018–19 plus 33% of their association coefficient from the same time span), with the ten teams which are pre-selected as hosts marked by (H).

Key to colours
Group winners advanced to round of 32

Seeding position 1
Team	Coeff.
(Norway) LSK Kvinner	42.405
(Kazakhstan) BIIK Kazygurt	34.580
(Lithuania) Gintra Universitetas (H)	27.930
(Netherlands) Twente (H)	26.900
(Cyprus) Apollon Limassol	20.270
(Serbia) Spartak Subotica	17.955
(Belarus) FC Minsk	16.625
(Bosnia and Herzegovina) SFK 2000 (H)	15.960
(Romania) Olimpia Cluj	15.960
(Scotland) Hibernian	13.085

Seeding position 2
Team	Coeff.
(Ukraine) Zhytlobud-1 Kharkiv (H)	11.800
(Austria) Sturm Graz	11.270
(Greece) PAOK	10.965
(Iceland) Breiðablik	10.930
(Slovenia) Pomurje (H)	9.640
(Finland) PK-35 Vantaa	8.635
(Poland) Górnik Łęczna	7.940
(Hungary) Ferencváros	7.465
(Albania) Vllaznia	7.315
(Bulgaria) NSA Sofia	6.650

Seeding position 3
Team	Coeff.
(Republic of Ireland) Wexford Youths	6.305
(Belgium) Anderlecht (H)	5.465
(Israel) ASA Tel Aviv	3.650
(Portugal) Braga	3.630
(Wales) Cardiff Met.	3.325
(Slovakia) Slovan Bratislava (H)	2.990
(Croatia) Split	2.970
(Turkey) Beşiktaş	2.475
(Montenegro) Breznica Pljevlja (H)	1.995
(Estonia) Flora (H)	1.485

Seeding position 4
Team	Coeff.
(Latvia) Rīgas FS (H)	1.330
(Malta) Birkirkara	0.830
(Faroe Islands) EB/Streymur/Skála	0.825
(Northern Ireland) Linfield	0.660
(Kosovo) Mitrovica	0.330
(Moldova) Agarista-ȘS Anenii Noi	0.165
(North Macedonia) Dragon 2014	0.000
(Luxembourg) Bettembourg	0.000
(Georgia (country)) Tbilisi Nike	0.000
(Armenia) Alashkert	0.000

== Format ==
In each group, teams played against each other in a round-robin mini-tournament at the pre-selected hosts. The ten group winners advanced to the round of 32 to join the 22 teams which received a bye.

=== Tiebreakers ===
Teams are ranked according to points (3 points for a win, 1 point for a draw, 0 points for a loss), and if tied on points, the following tiebreaking criteria are applied, in the order given, to determine the rankings (Regulations Articles 15.01 and 15.02):

1. Points in head-to-head matches among tied teams;
2. Goal difference in head-to-head matches among tied teams;
3. Goals scored in head-to-head matches among tied teams;
4. If more than two teams are tied, and after applying all head-to-head criteria above, a subset of teams are still tied, all head-to-head criteria above are reapplied exclusively to this subset of teams;
5. Goal difference in all group matches;
6. Goals scored in all group matches;
7. Penalty shoot-out if only two teams have the same number of points, and they met in the last round of the group and are tied after applying all criteria above (not used if more than two teams have the same number of points, or if their rankings are not relevant for qualification for the next stage);
8. Disciplinary points (red card = 3 points, yellow card = 1 point, expulsion for two yellow cards in one match = 3 points);
9. UEFA club coefficient.

== Groups ==
The matches were played on 7, 10 and 13 August 2019. In each group, the schedule was as follows (Regulations Article 20.04):

Matchday	Date	Matches
Matchday 1	7 August 2019	1 v 4, 3 v 2
Matchday 2	10 August 2019	1 v 3, 2 v 4
Matchday 3	13 August 2019	2 v 1, 4 v 3

Times are CEST (UTC+2), as listed by UEFA (local times, if different, are in parentheses).

=== Group 1 ===
Pos	Team	Pld	W	D	L	GF	GA	GD	Pts	Qualification	BRE	SFK	ASA	DRA
1	(Iceland) Breiðablik	3	3	0	0	18	2	+16	9	Knockout phase	—	3–1	—	11–0
2	(Bosnia and Herzegovina) SFK 2000 (H)	3	2	0	1	7	3	+4	6		—	—	1–0	5–0
3	(Israel) ASA Tel Aviv	3	1	0	2	8	5	+3	3		1–4	—	—	—
4	(North Macedonia) Dragon 2014	3	0	0	3	0	23	−23	0		—	—	0–7	—

Source: UEFA
Rules for classification: Tiebreakers
(H) Hosts
7 August 2019
11:00

ASA Tel Aviv (Israel)	1–4	(Iceland) Breiðablik
Elinav 70'	Report	Jóhannsdóttir 4'; Albertsdóttir 25', 66' (pen.); Hákonardóttir 60'

Koševo City Stadium, Sarajevo
Attendance: 35
Referee: Marina Višnjić (Serbia)
7 August 2019
17:00

SFK 2000 (Bosnia and Herzegovina)	5–0	(North Macedonia) Dragon 2014
Medić 9'; Spahić 59'; Đoković 76'; Bojat 85'; Kuč 90+1'	Report

Bosnia and Herzegovina FA Training Centre, Zenica
Attendance: 120
Referee: Marina Aufschnaiter (Austria)

10 August 2019
11:00

Breiðablik (Iceland)	11–0	(North Macedonia) Dragon 2014
Gunnlaugsdóttir 7'; Antonsdóttir 25', 63'; Þorvaldsdóttir 28' (pen.), 51', 64', 82'; Magnúsdóttir 45+2', 87'; Vilhjálmsdóttir 69'; Jóhannsdóttir 85'	Report

Koševo City Stadium, Sarajevo
Attendance: 25
Referee: Marina Višnjić (Serbia)
10 August 2019
17:00

SFK 2000 (Bosnia and Herzegovina)	1–0	(Israel) ASA Tel Aviv
Đoković 79'	Report

Bosnia and Herzegovina FA Training Centre, Zenica
Attendance: 150
Referee: Araksya Saribekyan (Armenia)

13 August 2019
17:00

Breiðablik (Iceland)	3–1	(Bosnia and Herzegovina) SFK 2000
Þorvaldsdóttir 18', 81'; Hasanbegović 30' (o.g.)	Report	Bojat 88'

Bosnia and Herzegovina FA Training Centre, Zenica
Attendance: 100
Referee: Araksya Saribekyan (Armenia)
13 August 2019
17:00

Dragon 2014 (North Macedonia)	0–7	(Israel) ASA Tel Aviv
	Report	Efraim 31'; Cohen 53' (pen.); Nakav 73'; Seiden 79'; Elinav 87', 89'; Ezurike 90'

Koševo City Stadium, Sarajevo
Attendance: 20
Referee: Marina Aufschnaiter (Austria)

=== Group 2 ===
Pos	Team	Pld	W	D	L	GF	GA	GD	Pts	Qualification	MIT	BRE	CLU	SOF
1	(Kosovo) Mitrovica	3	3	0	0	5	1	+4	9	Knockout phase	—	1–0	—	—
2	(Montenegro) Breznica Pljevlja (H)	3	1	1	1	7	7	0	4		—	—	—	4–4
3	(Romania) Olimpia Cluj	3	1	0	2	6	7	−1	3		1–2	2–3	—	—
4	(Bulgaria) NSA Sofia	3	0	1	2	6	9	−3	1		0–2	—	2–3	—

Source: UEFA
Rules for classification: Tiebreakers
(H) Hosts
7 August 2019
17:30

Olimpia Cluj (Romania)	1–2	(Kosovo) Mitrovica
Ficzay 90+5'	Report	Syla 24'; Gjegji 30'

Gradski stadion, Nikšić
Attendance: 25
Referee: Viki De Cremer (Belgium)
7 August 2019
20:00

Breznica Pljevlja (Montenegro)	4–4	(Bulgaria) NSA Sofia
Vujadinović 58'; Milovič 64', 73'; Karličić 82'	Report	Koshuleva 21', 23', 44'; Radoyska 62'

Stadion pod Malim brdom, Petrovac
Attendance: 150
Referee: Reelika Turi (Estonia)

10 August 2019
17:30

NSA Sofia (Bulgaria)	0–2	(Kosovo) Mitrovica
	Report	Gjegji 27'; Syla 50'

Gradski stadion, Nikšić
Attendance: 10
Referee: Reelika Turi (Estonia)
10 August 2019
18:00

Olimpia Cluj (Romania)	2–3	(Montenegro) Breznica Pljevlja
Ficzay 17'; Bălăceanu 71'	Report	Vujadinović 45+7'; Milovič 47' (pen.), 50'

Stadion pod Malim brdom, Petrovac
Attendance: 150
Referee: Vesna Budimir (Croatia)

13 August 2019
17:30

NSA Sofia (Bulgaria)	2–3	(Romania) Olimpia Cluj
Koshuleva 41', 45+2'	Report	Voicu 34', 53', 72'

Stadion pod Malim brdom, Petrovac
Attendance: 25
Referee: Vesna Budimir (Croatia)
13 August 2019
17:30

Mitrovica (Kosovo)	1–0	(Montenegro) Breznica Pljevlja
Biqkaj 89' (pen.)	Report

Gradski stadion, Nikšić
Attendance: 200
Referee: Viki De Cremer (Belgium)

=== Group 3 ===
Pos	Team	Pld	W	D	L	GF	GA	GD	Pts	Qualification	HIB	CAR	POM	TBI
1	(Scotland) Hibernian	3	3	0	0	7	2	+5	9	Knockout phase	—	2–1	—	3–0
2	(Wales) Cardiff Met.	3	2	0	1	7	3	+4	6		—	—	1–0	—
3	(Slovenia) Pomurje (H)	3	1	0	2	5	3	+2	3		1–2	—	—	4–0
4	(Georgia (country)) Tbilisi Nike	3	0	0	3	1	12	−11	0		—	1–5	—	—

Source: UEFA
Rules for classification: Tiebreakers
(H) Hosts
7 August 2019
16:00

Hibernian (Scotland)	3–0	(Georgia (country)) Tbilisi Nike
Cavanagh 17'; Napier 68', 90+3'	Report

Beltinci Sports Park, Beltinci
Attendance: 50
Referee: Ioanna Allayiotou (Cyprus)
7 August 2019
20:45

Cardiff Met. (Wales)	1–0	(Slovenia) Pomurje
Clipston 88'	Report

Fazanerija City Stadium, Murska Sobota
Attendance: 582
Referee: Zulema González González (Spain)

10 August 2019
11:00

Hibernian (Scotland)	2–1	(Wales) Cardiff Met.
Gallacher 20'; Murray 68'	Report	Allen 88'

Beltinci Sports Park, Beltinci
Attendance: 40
Referee: Volha Tsiareshka (Belarus)
10 August 2019
17:00

Pomurje (Slovenia)	4–0	(Georgia (country)) Tbilisi Nike
Prša 4' (pen.), 19' (pen.); Zajmi 52'; Makovec 89'	Report

Beltinci Sports Park, Beltinci
Attendance: 435
Referee: Zulema González González (Spain)

13 August 2019
17:00

Pomurje (Slovenia)	1–2	(Scotland) Hibernian
Prša 45' (pen.)	Report	Napier 7'; Davidson 36'

Beltinci Sports Park, Beltinci
Attendance: 715
Referee: Volha Tsiareshka (Belarus)
13 August 2019
17:00

Tbilisi Nike (Georgia (country))	1–5	(Wales) Cardiff Met.
Mtskerashvili 90+5'	Report	Schupbach 27', 38'; Clipston 44', 90'; Pinder 65'

Fazanerija City Stadium, Murska Sobota
Attendance: 40
Referee: Ioanna Allayiotou (Cyprus)

=== Group 4 ===
Pos	Team	Pld	W	D	L	GF	GA	GD	Pts	Qualification	MIN	KHA	SPL	BET
1	(Belarus) FC Minsk	3	3	0	0	16	1	+15	9	Knockout phase	—	—	2–1	12–0
2	(Ukraine) Zhytlobud-1 Kharkiv (H)	3	2	0	1	9	4	+5	6		0–2	—	—	6–0
3	(Croatia) Split	3	1	0	2	10	7	+3	3		—	2–3	—	—
4	(Luxembourg) Bettembourg	3	0	0	3	2	25	−23	0		—	—	2–7	—

Source: UEFA
Rules for classification: Tiebreakers
(H) Hosts
7 August 2019
10:00 (11:00 EEST)

FC Minsk (Belarus)	12–0	(Luxembourg) Bettembourg
Ogbiagbevha 5', 26', 61', 74'; Cissé 8'; Shuppo 16' (pen.), 53'; Khimich 45+2', 51', 82'; Aniset 58' (o.g.); Madiba 67'	Report

FC Metalist Training Ground, Vysokyi
Attendance: 154
Referee: Michaliną Diakow (Poland)
7 August 2019
16:00 (17:00 EEST)

Split (Croatia)	2–3	(Ukraine) Zhytlobud-1 Kharkiv
Lubina 1'; Pedić 29'	Report	Apanashchenko 12', 90' (pen.), 90+3'

FC Metalist Training Ground, Vysokyi
Attendance: 620
Referee: Ifeoma Kulmala (Finland)

10 August 2019
10:00 (11:00 EEST)

FC Minsk (Belarus)	2–1	(Croatia) Split
Khimich 13'; Ogbiagbevha 65'	Report	Dujmović 33'

FC Metalist Training Ground, Vysokyi
Attendance: 130
Referee: Galiya Echeva (Bulgaria)
10 August 2019
16:00 (17:00 EEST)

Zhytlobud-1 Kharkiv (Ukraine)	6–0	(Luxembourg) Bettembourg
Nesterenko 4', 25'; Shevchuk 11'; Voronina 40'; Utitskikh 66'; Petryk 89'	Report

FC Metalist Training Ground, Vysokyi
Attendance: 300
Referee: Ifeoma Kulmala (Finland)

13 August 2019
16:00 (17:00 EEST)

Zhytlobud-1 Kharkiv (Ukraine)	0–2	(Belarus) FC Minsk
	Report	Ogbiagbevha 44'; Linnik 52'

Metalist Oblast Sports Complex, Kharkiv
Attendance: 2,100
Referee: Galiya Echeva (Bulgaria)
13 August 2019
16:00 (17:00 EEST)

Bettembourg (Luxembourg)	2–7	(Croatia) Split
Thill 33', 43'	Report	Pedić 7', 37'; Dujmović 21', 30', 64'; O'Neill 28'; Valušek 57'

FC Metalist Training Ground, Vysokyi
Attendance: 75
Referee: Michaliną Diakow (Poland)

=== Group 5 ===
Pos	Team	Pld	W	D	L	GF	GA	GD	Pts	Qualification	SUB	FER	BRA	ANE
1	(Serbia) Spartak Subotica	3	2	1	0	21	2	+19	7	Knockout phase	—	—	7–0	12–0
2	(Hungary) Ferencváros	3	2	1	0	7	3	+4	7		2–2	—	—	2–0
3	(Slovakia) Slovan Bratislava (H)	3	1	0	2	2	10	−8	3		—	1–3	—	—
4	(Moldova) Agarista-ȘS Anenii Noi	3	0	0	3	0	15	−15	0		—	—	0–1	—

Source: UEFA
Rules for classification: Tiebreakers
(H) Hosts
7 August 2019
13:00

Spartak Subotica (Serbia)	12–0	(Moldova) Agarista-ȘS Anenii Noi
Adamek 3', 67', 72'; Denda 16'; Matić 20'; Delgadillo 27', 31', 45+2'; Filipović 29', 33', 84'; Williams 79'	Report

Štadión Pasienky, Bratislava
Attendance: 20
Referee: Abigail Marriott (England)
7 August 2019
17:30

Slovan Bratislava (Slovakia)	1–3	(Hungary) Ferencváros
Bytčánková 33'	Report	Kocsán 39'; Aleksić 67'; Diószegi 83'

Štadión Pasienky, Bratislava
Attendance: 586
Referee: Victoria Beyer (France)

10 August 2019
13:00

Ferencváros (Hungary)	2–0	(Moldova) Agarista-ȘS Anenii Noi
Loghin 25' (o.g.); Fogl 42'	Report

Štadión Pasienky, Bratislava
Attendance: 102
Referee: Victoria Beyer (France)
10 August 2019
17:30

Spartak Subotica (Serbia)	7–0	(Slovakia) Slovan Bratislava
Slović 21'; Matić 37', 53'; Filipović 58'; Adamek 59'; Bačová 78' (o.g.); Stupar 85' (pen.)	Report

Štadión Pasienky, Bratislava
Attendance: 274
Referee: Vera Opeykina (Russia)

13 August 2019
17:00

Ferencváros (Hungary)	2–2	(Serbia) Spartak Subotica
Vágó 20', 78'	Report	Filipović 56'; Matić 80'

Štadión Pasienky, Bratislava
Attendance: 256
Referee: Vera Opeykina (Russia)
13 August 2019
17:00

Agarista-ȘS Anenii Noi (Moldova)	0–1	(Slovakia) Slovan Bratislava
	Report	Cerescu 35' (o.g.)

Tehelné pole, Bratislava
Attendance: 211
Referee: Abigail Marriott (England)

=== Group 6 ===
Pos	Team	Pld	W	D	L	GF	GA	GD	Pts	Qualification	KAZ	VAN	FLO	EBS
1	(Kazakhstan) BIIK Kazygurt	3	3	0	0	15	1	+14	9	Knockout phase	—	—	2–0	9–0
2	(Finland) PK-35 Vantaa	3	2	0	1	9	6	+3	6		1–4	—	—	5–0
3	(Estonia) Flora (H)	3	1	0	2	4	5	−1	3		—	2–3	—	—
4	(Faroe Islands) EB/Streymur/Skála	3	0	0	3	0	16	−16	0		—	—	0–2	—

Source: UEFA
Rules for classification: Tiebreakers
(H) Hosts
7 August 2019
14:00 (15:00 EEST)

BIIK Kazygurt (Kazakhstan)	9–0	(Faroe Islands) EB/Streymur/Skála
Gabelia 10', 13', 15', 28', 45+2'; Babshuk 22', 55'; Bortnikova 79'; Reuben 83'	Report

Kadriorg Stadium, Tallinn
Attendance: 30
Referee: Katalin Sipos (Hungary)
7 August 2019
18:00 (19:00 EEST)

Flora (Estonia)	2–3	(Finland) PK-35 Vantaa
Saulep 16'; Saar 46'	Report	Kilponen 56'; Autio 86'; Strigin 90+1' (o.g.)

A. Le Coq Arena, Tallinn
Attendance: 322
Referee: Valentina Finzi (Italy)

10 August 2019
14:00 (15:00 EEST)

PK-35 Vantaa (Finland)	5–0	(Faroe Islands) EB/Streymur/Skála
Autio 15'; Vlasoff 47'; Koso 75'; Huneck 78' (o.g.); Laurento-Falcoff 80'	Report

Kadriorg Stadium, Tallinn
Attendance: 95
Referee: Valentina Finzi (Italy)
10 August 2019
18:00 (19:00 EEST)

BIIK Kazygurt (Kazakhstan)	2–0	(Estonia) Flora
Litvinenko 13', 19'	Report

A. Le Coq Arena, Tallinn
Attendance: 257
Referee: Henrikke Nervik (Norway)

13 August 2019
17:00 (18:00 EEST)

PK-35 Vantaa (Finland)	1–4	(Kazakhstan) BIIK Kazygurt
Saastamoinen 90+2'	Report	Zulu 23'; Babshuk 38'; Kundananji 60'; Ilić 62'

Kadriorg Stadium, Tallinn
Attendance: 100
Referee: Henrikke Nervik (Norway)
13 August 2019
17:00 (18:00 EEST)

EB/Streymur/Skála (Faroe Islands)	0–2	(Estonia) Flora
	Report	Saar 26', 28'

Rakvere Linnastaadion, Rakvere
Attendance: 84
Referee: Katalin Sipos (Hungary)

=== Group 7 ===
Pos	Team	Pld	W	D	L	GF	GA	GD	Pts	Qualification	BRA	LIM	GRA	RIG
1	(Portugal) Braga	3	3	0	0	11	0	+11	9	Knockout phase	—	—	2–0	—
2	(Cyprus) Apollon Limassol	3	2	0	1	17	3	+14	6		0–1	—	—	10–0
3	(Austria) Sturm Graz	3	1	0	2	6	9	−3	3		—	2–7	—	4–0
4	(Latvia) Rīgas FS (H)	3	0	0	3	0	22	−22	0		0–8	—	—	—

Source: UEFA
Rules for classification: Tiebreakers
(H) Hosts
7 August 2019
12:30 (13:30 EEST)

Braga (Portugal)	2–0	(Austria) Sturm Graz
Marques 37'; Pratt 77'	Report

Stadions Arkādija, Riga
Attendance: 50
Referee: Irena Velevačkoska (North Macedonia)
7 August 2019
17:00 (18:00 EEST)

Apollon Limassol (Cyprus)	10–0	(Latvia) Rīgas FS
Šurnovská 10'; Sidira 12' (pen.), 29' (pen.); Begič 14'; Hardy 20', 41', 64'; Freda 36' (pen.), 79', 85'	Report

Stadions Arkādija, Riga
Attendance: 147
Referee: Michèle Schmölzer (Switzerland)

10 August 2019
12:30 (13:30 EEST)

Sturm Graz (Austria)	4–0	(Latvia) Rīgas FS
Plattner 38', 72'; Uka 55'; Wagner 69'	Report

Stadions Arkādija, Riga
Attendance: 75
Referee: Irena Velevačkoska (North Macedonia)
10 August 2019
17:00 (18:00 EEST)

Apollon Limassol (Cyprus)	0–1	(Portugal) Braga
	Report	Pratt 10'

Stadions Arkādija, Riga
Attendance: 90
Referee: Sabina Bolić (Croatia)

13 August 2019
17:00 (18:00 EEST)

Sturm Graz (Austria)	2–7	(Cyprus) Apollon Limassol
Wagner 45+2'; Habuda 63'	Report	Hardy 6', 13'; Freda 15', 80'; Markou 24', 54'; Kröll 70' (o.g.)

Zemgale Olympic Center, Jelgava
Attendance: 51
Referee: Sabina Bolić (Croatia)
13 August 2019
17:00 (18:00 EEST)

Rīgas FS (Latvia)	0–8	(Portugal) Braga
	Report	Babi 2'; Cardoso 11', 70'; Marques 19', 75'; Silva 24'; Luís 55'; Pratt 61'

Stadions Arkādija, Riga
Attendance: 63
Referee: Michèle Schmölzer (Switzerland)

=== Group 8 ===
Pos	Team	Pld	W	D	L	GF	GA	GD	Pts	Qualification	AND	LSK	LIN	PAO
1	(Belgium) Anderlecht (H)	3	3	0	0	11	3	+8	9	Knockout phase	—	—	—	5–0
2	(Norway) LSK Kvinner	3	2	0	1	7	3	+4	6		2–3	—	4–0	—
3	(Northern Ireland) Linfield	3	1	0	2	4	9	−5	3		1–3	—	—	—
4	(Greece) PAOK	3	0	0	3	2	9	−7	0		—	0–1	2–3	—

Source: UEFA
Rules for classification: Tiebreakers
(H) Hosts
7 August 2019
14:00

LSK Kvinner (Norway)	4–0	(Northern Ireland) Linfield
Thorsnes 10', 24'; Åsland 24'; Abrahamsen 27'	Report

Van Roystadion, Denderleeuw
Attendance: 0
Referee: Jelena Cvetković (Serbia)
7 August 2019
18:30

Anderlecht (Belgium)	5–0	(Greece) PAOK
De Caigny 45+2', 55', 72'; Tison 47'; Rus 65'	Report

Constant Vanden Stock Stadium, Anderlecht
Attendance: 754
Referee: Aleksandra Česen (Slovenia)

10 August 2019
14:00

LSK Kvinner (Norway)	2–3	(Belgium) Anderlecht
Gausdal 47'; Haug 88'	Report	Rus 49'; De Neve 72'; Toloba 87'

Constant Vanden Stock Stadium, Anderlecht
Attendance: 813
Referee: María Dolores Martínez Madrona (Spain)
10 August 2019
18:30

PAOK (Greece)	2–3	(Northern Ireland) Linfield
Vardali 7'; Mitkou 32'	Report	Burrows 14'; Hutton 24'; McGuinness 89' (pen.)

Van Roystadion, Denderleeuw
Attendance: 89
Referee: Aleksandra Česen (Slovenia)

13 August 2019
17:00

PAOK (Greece)	0–1	(Norway) LSK Kvinner
	Report	Wold 68' (pen.)

Van Roystadion, Denderleeuw
Attendance: 25
Referee: María Dolores Martínez Madrona (Spain)
13 August 2019
17:00

Linfield (Northern Ireland)	1–3	(Belgium) Anderlecht
McGuinness 55' (pen.)	Report	Deloose 24', 34'; Coryn 66'

Constant Vanden Stock Stadium, Anderlecht
Attendance: 551
Referee: Jelena Cvetković (Serbia)

=== Group 9 ===
Pos	Team	Pld	W	D	L	GF	GA	GD	Pts	Qualification	TWE	BES	GOR	ALA
1	(Netherlands) Twente (H)	3	2	1	0	12	2	+10	7	Knockout phase	—	2–2	—	8–0
2	(Turkey) Beşiktaş	3	1	2	0	6	3	+3	5		—	—	1–1	—
3	(Poland) Górnik Łęczna	3	1	1	1	14	3	+11	4		0–2	—	—	13–0
4	(Armenia) Alashkert	3	0	0	3	0	24	−24	0		—	0–3	—	—

Source: UEFA
Rules for classification: Tiebreakers
(H) Hosts
7 August 2019
18:30

Twente (Netherlands)	8–0	(Armenia) Alashkert
Vanmechelen 19', 89'; Kalma 31', 46'; Mesropyan 32' (o.g.); Ellouzi 39'; Sakhinova 45+3' (o.g.); Weerden 59'	Report

Sportpark Heeckeren, Goor
Attendance: 475
Referee: Fatemeh Zangeneh (Norway)
7 August 2019
18:30

Beşiktaş (Turkey)	1–1	(Poland) Górnik Łęczna
Hançar 75'	Report	Jędrzejewicz 77'

Sportpark Scheurserve, Enschede
Attendance: 107
Referee: Lucie Šulcová (Czech Republic)

10 August 2019
18:00

Twente (Netherlands)	2–2	(Turkey) Beşiktaş
Kalma 8', 46'	Report	Uraz 21'; Keskin 88'

Sportpark Scheurserve, Enschede
Attendance: 450
Referee: Iuliana Demetrescu (Romania)
10 August 2019
18:00

Górnik Łęczna (Poland)	13–0	(Armenia) Alashkert
Sakhinova 5' (o.g.); Karczewska 11', 18', 39'; Jędrzejewicz 13', 63', 74'; Kamczyk 34' (pen.), 59', 84', 90+3'; Matysik 38'; Dyguś 79'	Report

Sportpark Heeckeren, Goor
Attendance: 32
Referee: Lucie Šulcová (Czech Republic)

13 August 2019
18:30

Górnik Łęczna (Poland)	0–2	(Netherlands) Twente
	Report	Kalma 52' (pen.); Jansen 70'

Sportpark Scheurserve, Enschede
Attendance: 400
Referee: Iuliana Demetrescu (Romania)
13 August 2019
18:30

Alashkert (Armenia)	0–3	(Turkey) Beşiktaş
	Report	Hançar 45+2'; O'Rourke 87'; Çınar 90+5'

Sportpark Heeckeren, Goor
Attendance: 65
Referee: Fatemeh Zangeneh (Norway)

=== Group 10 ===
Pos	Team	Pld	W	D	L	GF	GA	GD	Pts	Qualification
1	(Albania) Vllaznia	3	2	1	0	5	2	+3	7	Knockout phase
2	(Republic of Ireland) Wexford Youths	3	2	0	1	10	6	+4	6	
3	(Lithuania) Gintra Universitetas (H)	3	1	1	1	3	3	0	4	
4	(Malta) Birkirkara	3	0	0	3	2	9	−7	0	

Source: UEFA
Rules for classification: Tiebreakers
(H) Hosts
7 August 2019
12:00 (13:00 EEST)

Wexford Youths (Republic of Ireland)	1–3	(Albania) Vllaznia
Kennedy 18'	Report	Dauzat 30'; Doyle 40'; Doci 42'

Alytus Stadium, Alytus
Attendance: 247
Referee: Tinna Høj Christensen (Denmark)
7 August 2019
17:00 (18:00 EEST)

Gintra Universitetas (Lithuania)	1–0	(Malta) Birkirkara
Freitas 2'	Report

Alytus Stadium, Alytus
Attendance: 620
Referee: Lizzy van der Helm (Netherlands)

10 August 2019
12:00 (13:00 EEST)

Vllaznia (Albania)	1–0	(Malta) Birkirkara
Doyle 16'	Report

Alytus Stadium, Alytus
Attendance: 57
Referee: Tinna Høj Christensen (Denmark)
10 August 2019
17:00 (18:00 EEST)

Gintra Universitetas (Lithuania)	1–2	(Republic of Ireland) Wexford Youths
Freitas 15'	Report	Davidson 37'; Kelly 47'

Alytus Stadium, Alytus
Attendance: 400
Referee: Hristiana Guteva (Bulgaria)

13 August 2019
17:00 (18:00 EEST)

Vllaznia (Albania)	1–1	(Lithuania) Gintra Universitetas
Doci 78' (pen.)	Report	Gudchenko 49'

Alytus Stadium, Alytus
Attendance: 564
Referee: Hristiana Guteva (Bulgaria)
13 August 2019
17:00 (18:00 EEST)

Birkirkara (Malta)	2–7	(Republic of Ireland) Wexford Youths
Giusti 44'; Carabott 63'	Report	Murphy 32', 61', 68'; Davidson 35'; Kennedy 53'; Jarrett 85'; Rossiter 90+1'

Sūduva Stadium, Marijampolė
Attendance: 50
Referee: Lizzy van der Helm (Netherlands)
