= 2019–20 UEFA Women's Champions League knockout phase =

Tournament details
- Dates: 11 September 2019 – 30 August 2020
- Teams: 32 (from 23 associations)

Tournament statistics
- Matches played: 55
- Goals scored: 208 (3.78 per match)
- Attendance: 83,146 (1,512 per match)
- Top scorer(s): (Netherlands) Vivianne Miedema (10 goals)

The 2019–20 UEFA Women's Champions League knockout phase began on 11 September 2019 with the round of 32 and ended with the final on 30 August 2020 at the Anoeta Stadium in San Sebastián, Spain, to decide the champions of the 2019–20 UEFA Women's Champions League. A total of 32 teams competed in the knockout phase.

Times are CET/CEST, (Note: CET (UTC+1) for dates from 27 October 2019 up to 28 March 2020 (second legs of round of 16), and CEST (UTC+2) for all other dates.) as listed by UEFA (local times, if different, are in parentheses).

== Qualified teams ==
The knockout phase involved 32 teams: 22 teams which received a bye, and the ten teams which advanced from the qualifying round (ten group winners).

Below are the 32 teams which participated in the knockout phase (with their 2019 UEFA women's club coefficients, which take into account their performance in European competitions from 2014–15 to 2018–19 plus 33% of their association coefficient from the same time span).

Bye to round of 32
Team	Coeff.
(France) Lyon (Title holders)	129.865
(Germany) VfL Wolfsburg	112.575
(France) Paris Saint-Germain	99.865
(Spain) Barcelona	91.160
(Germany) Bayern Munich	67.575
(Czech Republic) Slavia Prague	59.870
(England) Manchester City	59.655
(Denmark) Brøndby	50.045
(Denmark) Fortuna Hjørring	47.045
(Switzerland) Zürich	44.230
(Scotland) Glasgow City	34.085
(Spain) Atlético Madrid	33.160
(Czech Republic) Sparta Prague	32.870
(Italy) Fiorentina	26.890
(Austria) St. Pölten	20.270
(England) Arsenal	17.655
(Sweden) Piteå	17.655
(Sweden) Kopparbergs/Göteborg	17.655
(Italy) Juventus	14.890
(Russia) Ryazan-VDV	14.580
(Switzerland) Lugano	10.230
(Russia) Chertanovo Moscow	5.580

Advanced from qualifying round
Group	Group winners	Coeff.
1	(Iceland) Breiðablik	10.930
2	(Kosovo) Mitrovica	0.330
3	(Scotland) Hibernian	13.085
4	(Belarus) FC Minsk	16.625
5	(Serbia) Spartak Subotica	17.955
6	(Kazakhstan) BIIK Kazygurt	34.580
7	(Portugal) Braga	3.630
8	(Belgium) Anderlecht	5.465
9	(Netherlands) Twente	26.900
10	(Albania) Vllaznia	7.315

== Format ==
Each tie in the knockout phase, apart from the final, was played over two legs, with each team playing one leg at home. The team that scored more goals on aggregate over the two legs advanced to the next round. If the aggregate score was level, the away goals rule was applied, i.e. the team that scored more goals away from home over the two legs advanced. If away goals were also equal, then extra time was played. The away goals rule was again applied after extra time, i.e. if there were goals scored during extra time and the aggregate score was still level, the visiting team advanced by virtue of more away goals scored. If no goals were scored during extra time, the tie was decided by a penalty shoot-out. In the final, which was played as a single match, if the score was level at the end of normal time, extra time would be played, followed by penalty shoot-out if the score remained tied.

The mechanism of the draws for each round was as follows:

- In the draw for the round of 32, the sixteen teams with the highest UEFA women's club coefficients were seeded (with the title holders being the automatic top seed), and the other sixteen teams were unseeded. The seeded teams were drawn against the unseeded teams, with the seeded teams hosting the second leg. Teams from the same association could not be drawn against each other.
- In the draw for the round of 16, the eight teams with the highest UEFA women's club coefficients were seeded (with the title holders being the automatic top seed should they qualify), and the other eight teams were unseeded. The seeded teams were drawn against the unseeded teams, with the order of legs decided by draw. Teams from the same association could not be drawn against each other.
- In the draws for the quarter-finals and semi-finals, there were no seedings, and teams from the same association could be drawn against each other. As the draws for the quarter-finals and semi-finals were held together before the quarter-finals were played, the identity of the teams in the semi-finals were not known at the time of the draw. A draw was also held to determine the "home" team for the final (for administrative purposes as it was played at a neutral venue).

On 17 June 2020, UEFA announced that due to the COVID-19 pandemic in Europe, the final stages of the competition would feature a format change. The quarter-finals, semi-finals and final would be played in a single-leg format from 21 to 30 August 2020 in Bilbao and San Sebastián, Spain. The matches were played behind closed doors.

== Schedule ==
The schedule of the knockout phase was as follows (all draws are held at the UEFA headquarters in Nyon, Switzerland).

The competition was postponed indefinitely on 17 March 2020 due to the COVID-19 pandemic in Europe. The final, originally scheduled to be played on 24 May 2020 at the Viola Park, Vienna, was officially postponed on 23 March 2020. A working group was set up by UEFA to decide the calendar of the remainder of the season, with the final decision made at the UEFA Executive Committee meeting on 17 June 2020.

Schedule for 2019–20 UEFA Women's Champions League
Round	Draw	First leg	Second leg
Round of 32	16 August 2019	11–12 September 2019	25–26 September 2019
Round of 16	30 September 2019	16–17 October 2019	30–31 October 2019
Quarter-finals	8 November 2019	21–22 August 2020 at San Mamés, Bilbao and Anoeta Stadium, San Sebastián (Note: Quarter-finals originally scheduled for 24–25 March (first legs) and 1–2 April 2020 (second legs), but postponed, relocated and changed to single-leg format due to COVID-19 pandemic in Europe)	
Semi-finals	8 November 2019	25–26 August 2020 at San Mamés, Bilbao and Anoeta Stadium, San Sebastián (Note: Semi-final originally scheduled for 25–26 April (first legs) and 2–3 May 2020 (second legs), but postponed, relocated and changed to single-leg format due to COVID-19 pandemic in Europe)	
Final	8 November 2019	30 August 2020 at Anoeta Stadium, San Sebastián (Note: Final originally scheduled for 24 May 2020 at Viola Park (Vienna), Vienna, but postponed and relocated due to COVID-19 pandemic in Europe)	

== Bracket ==
Round of 32
(Sweden) Piteå	0	1	1
(Denmark) Brøndby	1	1	2
(Russia) Chertanovo Moscow	0	1	1
(Scotland) Glasgow City	1	4	5
(Kosovo) Mitrovica	0	0	0
(Germany) VfL Wolfsburg	10	5	15
(Austria) St. Pölten	2	2	4
(Netherlands) Twente	4	1	5
(Switzerland) Lugano	1	0	1
(England) Manchester City	7	4	11
(Serbia) Spartak Subotica	2	1	3
(Spain) Atlético Madrid	3	1	4
(Italy) Juventus	0	1	1
(Spain) Barcelona	2	2	4
(Belarus) FC Minsk	1	3	4
(Switzerland) Zürich	0	1	1
(Scotland) Hibernian	1	1	2
(Czech Republic) Slavia Prague	4	5	9
(Italy) Fiorentina	0	0	0
(England) Arsenal	4	2	6
(Iceland) Breiðablik	3	1	4
(Czech Republic) Sparta Prague	2	0	2
(Portugal) Braga	0	0	0
(France) Paris Saint-Germain	7	0	7
(Albania) Vllaznia	0	0	0
(Denmark) Fortuna Hjørring	1	2	3
(Russia) Ryazan-VDV	0	0	0
(France) Lyon	9	7	16
(Belgium) Anderlecht	1	0	1
(Kazakhstan) BIIK Kazygurt	1	2	3
(Sweden) Kopparbergs/Göteborg	1	1	2
(Germany) Bayern Munich (a)	2	0	2

Round of 16
(Denmark) Brøndby	0	2	2 (1)
(Scotland) Glasgow City (p)	2	0	2 (3)
(Germany) VfL Wolfsburg	6	1	7
(Netherlands) Twente	0	0	0
(England) Manchester City	1	1	2
(Spain) Atlético Madrid	1	2	3
(Spain) Barcelona	5	3	8
(Belarus) FC Minsk	0	1	1
(Czech Republic) Slavia Prague	2	0	2
(England) Arsenal	5	8	13
(Iceland) Breiðablik	0	1	1
(France) Paris Saint-Germain	4	3	7
(Denmark) Fortuna Hjørring	0	0	0
(France) Lyon	4	7	11
(Kazakhstan) BIIK Kazygurt	0	0	0
(Germany) Bayern Munich	5	2	7

Quarter-finals
21 August – San Sebastián
(Scotland) Glasgow City	1
(Germany) VfL Wolfsburg	9
21 August – Bilbao
(Spain) Atlético Madrid	0
(Spain) Barcelona	1
22 August – San Sebastián
(England) Arsenal	1
(France) Paris Saint-Germain	2
22 August – Bilbao
(France) Lyon	2
(Germany) Bayern Munich	1

Semi-finals
25 August – San Sebastián
(Germany) VfL Wolfsburg	1
(Spain) Barcelona	0
26 August – Bilbao
(France) Paris Saint-Germain	0
(France) Lyon	1

Final
30 August – San Sebastián
(Germany) VfL Wolfsburg	1
(France) Lyon	3

== Round of 32 ==
The draw for the round of 32 was held on 16 August 2019, 13:30 CEST.

Seeded	Unseeded
(France) Lyon; (Germany) VfL Wolfsburg; (France) Paris Saint-Germain; (Spain) Barcelona; (Germany) Bayern Munich; (Czech Republic) Slavia Prague; (England) Manchester City; (Denmark) Brøndby; (Denmark) Fortuna Hjørring; (Switzerland) Zürich; (Kazakhstan) BIIK Kazygurt; (Scotland) Glasgow City; (Spain) Atlético Madrid; (Czech Republic) Sparta Prague; (Netherlands) Twente; (Italy) Fiorentina	(Austria) St. Pölten; (Serbia) Spartak Subotica; (England) Arsenal; (Sweden) Piteå; (Sweden) Kopparbergs/Göteborg; (Belarus) FC Minsk; (Italy) Juventus; (Russia) Ryazan-VDV; (Scotland) Hibernian; (Iceland) Breiðablik; (Switzerland) Lugano; (Russia) Chertanovo Moscow; (Albania) Vllaznia; (Belgium) Anderlecht; (Portugal) Braga; (Kosovo) Mitrovica

Notes

1. ^{Q} Advanced from qualifying round.

=== Overview ===
The first legs were played on 11 and 12 September, and the second legs on 25 and 26 September 2019.

Team 1	Agg.	Team 2	1st leg	2nd leg
Juventus (Italy)	1–4	(Spain) Barcelona	0–2	1–2
Hibernian (Scotland)	2–9	(Czech Republic) Slavia Prague	1–4	1–5
Spartak Subotica (Serbia)	3–4	(Spain) Atlético Madrid	2–3	1–1
Braga (Portugal)	0–7	(France) Paris Saint-Germain	0–7	0–0
Vllaznia (Albania)	0–3	(Denmark) Fortuna Hjørring	0–1	0–2
Chertanovo Moscow (Russia)	1–5	(Scotland) Glasgow City	0–1	1–4
Ryazan-VDV (Russia)	0–16	(France) Lyon	0–9	0–7
Fiorentina (Italy)	0–6 (Note: Order of legs reversed after original draw.)	(England) Arsenal	0–4	0–2
Kopparbergs/Göteborg (Sweden)	2–2 (a)	(Germany) Bayern Munich	1–2	1–0
St. Pölten (Austria)	4–5	(Netherlands) Twente	2–4	2–1
Anderlecht (Belgium)	1–3	(Kazakhstan) BIIK Kazygurt	1–1	0–2
Breiðablik (Iceland)	4–2	(Czech Republic) Sparta Prague	3–2	1–0
Mitrovica (Kosovo)	0–15	(Germany) VfL Wolfsburg	0–10	0–5
Piteå (Sweden)	1–2	(Denmark) Brøndby	0–1	1–1
Lugano (Switzerland)	1–11	(England) Manchester City	1–7	0–4
FC Minsk (Belarus)	4–1	(Switzerland) Zürich	1–0	3–1

=== Matches ===
11 September 2019
20:30

Juventus (Italy)	0–2	(Spain) Barcelona
	Report	Putellas 39'; Torrejón 72'

Stadio Giuseppe Moccagatta, Alessandria
Attendance: 5,692
Referee: Kateryna Monzul (Ukraine)
25 September 2019
18:30

Barcelona (Spain)	2–1	(Italy) Juventus
Putellas 32'; Girelli 38' (o.g.)	Report	Stašková 79'

Estadi Johan Cruyff, Sant Joan Despí
Attendance: 3,252
Referee: Esther Staubli (Switzerland)

Barcelona won 4–1 on aggregate.

11 September 2019
20:45 (19:45 BST)

Hibernian (Scotland)	1–4	(Czech Republic) Slavia Prague
Hunter 3'	Report	Kožárová 36', 40', 75'; Jarchovská 42'

Easter Road, Edinburgh
Attendance: 1,287
Referee: Marta Huerta de Aza (Spain)
25 September 2019
19:30

Slavia Prague (Czech Republic)	5–1	(Scotland) Hibernian
Divišová 5'; Kožárová 37', 60'; Svitková 69'; Szewieczková 90+1'	Report	Gallacher 20'

Sinobo Stadium, Prague
Attendance: 2,052
Referee: Désirée Grundbacher (Switzerland)

Slavia Prague won 9–2 on aggregate.

12 September 2019
20:00

Spartak Subotica (Serbia)	2–3	(Spain) Atlético Madrid
Slović 45+2' (pen.); Matić 79'	Report	Da Silva 20', 55'; Torrecilla 90'

Subotica City Stadium, Subotica
Attendance: 1,500
Referee: Cheryl Foster (Wales)
26 September 2019
19:00

Atlético Madrid (Spain)	1–1	(Serbia) Spartak Subotica
Strom 83'	Report	Adamek 56'

Centro Deportivo Wanda, Alcalá de Henares
Attendance: 1,250
Referee: Lorraine Clark (Scotland)

Atlético Madrid won 4–3 on aggregate.

12 September 2019
21:00 (20:00 WEST)

Braga (Portugal)	0–7	(France) Paris Saint-Germain
	Report	Katoto 7' (pen.), 32', 61'; Formiga 41'; Diani 47'; Huitema 90+3', 90+5'

Estádio Municipal de Braga, Braga
Attendance: 5,850
Referee: Lina Lehtovaara (Finland)
26 September 2019
20:30

Paris Saint-Germain (France)	0–0	(Portugal) Braga
	Report

Stade Jean-Bouin, Paris
Attendance: 1,187
Referee: Sara Persson (Sweden)

Paris Saint-Germain won 7–0 on aggregate.

11 September 2019
18:00

Vllaznia (Albania)	0–1	(Denmark) Fortuna Hjørring
	Report	Møller 67'

Loro Boriçi Stadium, Shkodër
Attendance: 1,500
Referee: Reelika Turi (Estonia)
25 September 2019
18:00

Fortuna Hjørring (Denmark)	2–0	(Albania) Vllaznia
Møller 6', 87' (pen.)	Report

Hjørring Stadium, Hjørring
Attendance: 1,015
Referee: Maria Marotta (Italy)

Fortuna Hjørring won 3–0 on aggregate.

11 September 2019
18:00 (19:00 MSK)

Chertanovo Moscow (Russia)	0–1	(Scotland) Glasgow City
	Report	Lauder 11'

Gorodok Stadium, Moscow
Attendance: 800
Referee: Petra Pavlikova (Slovakia)
26 September 2019
20:30 (19:30 BST)

Glasgow City (Scotland)	4–1	(Russia) Chertanovo Moscow
Lauder 7', 76'; Shine 29'; McLauchlan 67'	Report	Komissarova 3'

Petershill Park, Glasgow
Attendance: 597
Referee: Marta Huerta de Aza (Spain)

Glasgow City won 5–1 on aggregate.

11 September 2019
14:00 (15:00 MSK)

Ryazan-VDV (Russia)	0–9	(France) Lyon
	Report	Marozsán 12' (pen.); Hegerberg 27', 39', 70' (pen.); Renard 31', 77', 90'; Henry 37'; Majri 78' (pen.)

CSK Stadium, Ryazan
Attendance: 2,570
Referee: Elvira Nurmustafina (Kazakhstan)
25 September 2019
16:30

Lyon (France)	7–0	(Russia) Ryazan-VDV
Le Sommer 18'; Parris 21', 88'; Cascarino 40'; Hegerberg 55' (pen.), 90'; Renard 90+2' (pen.)	Report

Groupama OL Training Center, Décines-Charpieu
Attendance: 701
Referee: Silvia Domingos (Portugal)

Lyon won 16–0 on aggregate.

12 September 2019
19:00

Fiorentina (Italy)	0–4	(England) Arsenal
	Report	Miedema 18', 51'; Little 32'; Evans 55'

Stadio Artemio Franchi, Florence
Attendance: 5,338
Referee: Ivana Martinčić (Croatia)
26 September 2019
20:30 (19:30 BST)

Arsenal (England)	2–0	(Italy) Fiorentina
Little 43' (pen.); Miedema 74'	Report

Meadow Park, Borehamwood
Attendance: 595
Referee: Iuliana Demetrescu (Romania)

Arsenal won 6–0 on aggregate.

11 September 2019
18:45

Kopparbergs/Göteborg (Sweden)	1–2	(Germany) Bayern Munich
Rubensson 86' (pen.)	Report	Islacker 75' (pen.), 90+3'

Gamla Ullevi, Gothenburg
Attendance: 4,958
Referee: Olga Zadinová (Czech Republic)
25 September 2019
19:00

Bayern Munich (Germany)	0–1	(Sweden) Kopparbergs/Göteborg
	Report	Blomqvist 81'

FC Bayern Campus, Munich
Attendance: 510
Referee: Stéphanie Frappart (France)

2–2 on aggregate. Bayern Munich won by away goals.

11 September 2019
19:10

St. Pölten (Austria)	2–4	(Netherlands) Twente
Scharnböck 82'; Zágor 84'	Report	Kalma 10', 29' (pen.), 75'; Weerden 22'

NV Arena, Sankt Pölten
Attendance: 1,077
Referee: Anastasia Pustovoitova (Russia)
25 September 2019
19:00

Twente (Netherlands)	1–2	(Austria) St. Pölten
Kalma 8'	Report	Zágor 6'; Mikolajová 51'

De Grolsch Veste, Enschede
Attendance: 1,650
Referee: Volha Tsiareshka (Belarus)

Twente won 5–4 on aggregate.

12 September 2019
20:00

Anderlecht (Belgium)	1–1	(Kazakhstan) BIIK Kazygurt
Vanhamel 71'	Report	Litvinenko 53' (pen.)

Constant Vanden Stock Stadium, Anderlecht
Attendance: 698
Referee: Rebecca Welch (England)
25 September 2019
12:00 (16:00 ALMT)

BIIK Kazygurt (Kazakhstan)	2–0	(Belgium) Anderlecht
Rose 27'; Litvinenko 85' (pen.)	Report

Kazhymukan Munaitpasov Stadium, Shymkent
Attendance: 500
Referee: Ivana Projkovska (North Macedonia)

BIIK Kazygurt won 3–1 on aggregate.

11 September 2019
21:15 (19:15 WET)

Breiðablik (Iceland)	3–2	(Czech Republic) Sparta Prague
Þorvaldsdóttir 15', 78'; Vilhjálmsdóttir 80'	Report	Burkenroad 3', 36'

Kópavogsvöllur, Kópavogur
Attendance: 512
Referee: Eleni Antoniou (Greece)
26 September 2019
18:00

Sparta Prague (Czech Republic)	0–1	(Iceland) Breiðablik
	Report	Þorvaldsdóttir 55'

Stadion Letná, Prague
Attendance: 721
Referee: Monika Mularczyk (Poland)

Breiðablik won 4–2 on aggregate.

11 September 2019
18:00

Mitrovica (Kosovo)	0–10	(Germany) VfL Wolfsburg
	Report	Pajor 14'; Maritz 28', 63'; Huth 33'; Harder 46', 48' (pen.), 67'; Jakabfi 79'; Neto 85'; Minde 87'

Fadil Vokrri Stadium, Pristina
Attendance: 555
Referee: Tinna Høj Christensen (Denmark)
25 September 2019
18:00

VfL Wolfsburg (Germany)	5–0	(Kosovo) Mitrovica
Neto 24'; Harder 29'; Jakabfi 38'; Wolter 55'; Gunnarsdóttir 86' (pen.)	Report

AOK Stadion, Wolfsburg
Attendance: 1,347
Referee: Meliz Özçiğdem (Turkey)

VfL Wolfsburg won 15–0 on aggregate.

11 September 2019
19:00

Piteå (Sweden)	0–1	(Denmark) Brøndby
	Report	Sørensen 38'

LF Arena, Piteå
Attendance: 1,698
Referee: Katalin Kulcsár (Hungary)
26 September 2019
18:00

Brøndby (Denmark)	1–1	(Sweden) Piteå
Sørensen 72'	Report	Abel 88' (o.g.)

Brøndby Stadium, Brøndbyvester
Attendance: 1,651
Referee: Riem Hussein (Germany)

Brøndby won 2–1 on aggregate.

12 September 2019
21:00

Lugano (Switzerland)	1–7	(England) Manchester City
Dickerman 41'	Report	Stanway 26'; Mannion 48' (pen.); Bremer 65', 77'; Weir 83', 90+3'; Beckie 85'

Cornaredo Stadium, Lugano
Attendance: 1,376
Referee: Ewa Augustyn (Poland)
25 September 2019
20:00 (19:00 BST)

Manchester City (England)	4–0	(Switzerland) Lugano
Beckie 5', 33', 49'; Bremer 78'	Report

Academy Stadium, Manchester
Attendance: 949
Referee: Tanja Subotič (Slovenia)

Manchester City won 11–1 on aggregate.

11 September 2019
16:00 (17:00 FET)

FC Minsk (Belarus)	1–0	(Switzerland) Zürich
Ogbiagbevha 21'	Report

FC Minsk Stadium, Minsk
Attendance: 1,500
Referee: Tess Olofsson (Sweden)
26 September 2019
19:00

Zürich (Switzerland)	1–3	(Belarus) FC Minsk
Humm 45'	Report	Ogbiagbevha 10', 76'; Duben 78'

Stadion Letzigrund, Zürich
Attendance: 2,684
Referee: Jana Adámková (Czech Republic)

FC Minsk won 4–1 on aggregate.

== Round of 16 ==
The draw for the round of 16 was held on 30 September 2019, 13:30 CEST.

Seeded	Unseeded
(France) Lyon; (Germany) VfL Wolfsburg; (France) Paris Saint-Germain; (Spain) Barcelona; (Germany) Bayern Munich; (Czech Republic) Slavia Prague; (England) Manchester City; (Denmark) Brøndby	(Denmark) Fortuna Hjørring; (Kazakhstan) BIIK Kazygurt; (Scotland) Glasgow City; (Spain) Atlético Madrid; (Netherlands) Twente; (England) Arsenal; (Belarus) FC Minsk; (Iceland) Breiðablik

=== Overview ===
The first legs were played on 16 and 17 October, and the second legs on 30 and 31 October 2019.

Team 1	Agg.	Team 2	1st leg	2nd leg
Brøndby (Denmark)	2–2 (1–3 p) (Note: Order of legs reversed after original draw.)	(Scotland) Glasgow City	0–2	2–0 (a.e.t.)
Barcelona (Spain)	8–1	(Belarus) FC Minsk	5–0	3–1
BIIK Kazygurt (Kazakhstan)	0–7	(Germany) Bayern Munich	0–5	0–2
Fortuna Hjørring (Denmark)	0–11	(France) Lyon	0–4	0–7
Breiðablik (Iceland)	1–7	(France) Paris Saint-Germain	0–4	1–3
VfL Wolfsburg (Germany)	7–0	(Netherlands) Twente	6–0	1–0
Slavia Prague (Czech Republic)	2–13	(England) Arsenal	2–5	0–8
Manchester City (England)	2–3	(Spain) Atlético Madrid	1–1	1–2

=== Matches ===
16 October 2019
18:00

Brøndby (Denmark)	0–2	(Scotland) Glasgow City
	Report	Henriksen 1' (o.g.); Abel 60' (o.g.)

Brøndby Stadium, Brøndbyvester
Attendance: 1,704
Referee: Ewa Augustyn (Poland)
31 October 2019
20:30 (19:30 GMT)

Glasgow City (Scotland)	0–2 (a.e.t.)	(Denmark) Brøndby
	Report	Christiansen 6'; Lindhardt 37'
Penalties
Ross (penalty scored); Howat (penalty missed); McSorley (penalty scored); Foley (penalty missed); Love (penalty scored)	3–1	(penalty scored) Christiansen; (penalty missed) Petersson; (penalty missed) Abildå; (penalty missed) Kristiansen

Petershill Park, Glasgow
Attendance: 800
Referee: Sara Persson (Sweden)

2–2 on aggregate. Glasgow City won 3–1 on penalties.

17 October 2019
19:00

Barcelona (Spain)	5–0	(Belarus) FC Minsk
Oshoala 6'; Torrejón 20'; Bonmatí 22', 26'; Hermoso 85'	Report

Estadi Johan Cruyff, Sant Joan Despí
Attendance: 1,698
Referee: Rebecca Welch (England)
30 October 2019
15:00 (17:00 FET)

FC Minsk (Belarus)	1–3	(Spain) Barcelona
Ogbiagbevha 60'	Report	Putellas 67'; Mariona 80'; Guijarro 85'

FC Minsk Stadium, Minsk
Attendance: 1,530
Referee: Katalin Kulcsár (Hungary)

Barcelona won 8–1 on aggregate.

16 October 2019
10:00 (14:00 ALMT)

BIIK Kazygurt (Kazakhstan)	0–5	(Germany) Bayern Munich
	Report	Damnjanović 23'; Magull 28' (pen.), 38'; Gielnik 73'; Rolser 80'

Kazhymukan Munaitpasov Stadium, Shymkent
Attendance: 890
Referee: Lina Lehtovaara (Finland)
30 October 2019
19:00

Bayern Munich (Germany)	2–0	(Kazakhstan) BIIK Kazygurt
Wenninger 10', 79'	Report

FC Bayern Campus, Munich
Attendance: 487
Referee: Anastasia Pustovoitova (Russia)

Bayern Munich won 7–0 on aggregate.

16 October 2019
19:00

Fortuna Hjørring (Denmark)	0–4	(France) Lyon
	Report	Hegerberg 17' (pen.), 54'; Le Sommer 29', 41'

Hjørring Stadium, Hjørring
Attendance: 1,953
Referee: Lorraine Clark (Scotland)
30 October 2019
16:30

Lyon (France)	7–0	(Denmark) Fortuna Hjørring
Hegerberg 12', 46'; Le Sommer 34'; Mbock Bathy 65'; Silva 81'; Buchanan 83'; Parris 90+3'	Report

Groupama OL Training Center, Décines-Charpieu
Attendance: 1,037
Referee: Cheryl Foster (Wales)

Lyon won 11–0 on aggregate.

16 October 2019
20:30 (18:30 WET)

Breiðablik (Iceland)	0–4	(France) Paris Saint-Germain
	Report	Sævik 10'; Formiga 18'; Katoto 29'; Dudek 90+2'

Kópavogsvöllur, Kópavogur
Attendance: 1,312
Referee: Olga Zadinová (Czech Republic)
31 October 2019
20:00

Paris Saint-Germain (France)	3–1	(Iceland) Breiðablik
Huitema 6', 78'; Diani 90+3'	Report	Þorvaldsdóttir 45+1'

Stade Jean-Bouin, Paris
Attendance: 1,312
Referee: Tess Olofsson (Sweden)

Paris Saint-Germain won 7–1 on aggregate.

16 October 2019
18:00

VfL Wolfsburg (Germany)	6–0	(Netherlands) Twente
Jakabfi 24', 37'; Bloodworth 60', 89'; Harder 71'; Rolfö 78'	Report

AOK Stadion, Wolfsburg
Attendance: 1,543
Referee: Marta Huerta de Aza (Spain)
30 October 2019
19:00

Twente (Netherlands)	0–1	(Germany) VfL Wolfsburg
	Report	Blässe 17'

De Grolsch Veste, Enschede
Attendance: 2,038
Referee: Esther Staubli (Switzerland)

VfL Wolfsburg won 7–0 on aggregate.

16 October 2019
18:30

Slavia Prague (Czech Republic)	2–5	(England) Arsenal
Svitková 71'; Persson 88'	Report	Miedema 24', 26', 39', 52'; Little 58' (pen.)

Sinobo Stadium, Prague
Attendance: 5,248
Referee: Eleni Antoniou (Greece)
31 October 2019
20:30 (19:30 GMT)

Arsenal (England)	8–0	(Czech Republic) Slavia Prague
Van de Donk 21', 59', 70'; Little 24' (pen.); Roord 33'; Miedema 45+1', 74', 86'	Report

Meadow Park, Borehamwood
Attendance: 668
Referee: Riem Hussein (Germany)

Arsenal won 13–2 on aggregate.

16 October 2019
20:00 (19:00 BST)

Manchester City (England)	1–1	(Spain) Atlético Madrid
Beckie 13'	Report	Corral 81'

Academy Stadium, Manchester
Attendance: 1,219
Referee: Ivana Martinčić (Croatia)
30 October 2019
19:30

Atlético Madrid (Spain)	2–1	(England) Manchester City
Houghton 40' (o.g.); Sosa 68'	Report	Bremer 88'

Centro Deportivo Wanda, Alcalá de Henares
Attendance: 2,132
Referee: Stéphanie Frappart (France)

Atlético Madrid won 3–2 on aggregate.

== Quarter-finals ==
The draw for the quarter-finals was held on 8 November 2019, 13:30 CET.

=== Overview ===
The quarter-finals, originally scheduled to be played on 25 March (first legs) and 1 April 2020 (second legs), were postponed indefinitely by UEFA due to concerns over the COVID-19 pandemic in Europe. They were rescheduled as single-leg matches on 21 and 22 August 2020, with two matches each (one on each day) played at San Mamés, Bilbao and Anoeta, San Sebastián. A draw was held on 26 June 2020 at the UEFA headquarters in Nyon, Switzerland to determine the order of matches.

Team 1	Score	Team 2
Atlético Madrid (Spain)	0–1	(Spain) Barcelona
Lyon (France)	2–1	(Germany) Bayern Munich
Glasgow City (Scotland)	1–9	(Germany) VfL Wolfsburg
Arsenal (England)	1–2	(France) Paris Saint-Germain

=== Matches ===
21 August 2020
18:00

Atlético Madrid (Spain)	0–1	(Spain) Barcelona
	Report	Hamraoui 80'

San Mamés, Bilbao
Attendance: 0 (Note: The remainder of the competition, held in August 2020, was played behind closed doors due to the COVID-19 pandemic in Europe.)
Referee: Stéphanie Frappart (France)

21 August 2020
18:00

Glasgow City (Scotland)	1–9	(Germany) VfL Wolfsburg
Wade 63'	Report	Harder 16', 45+2', 56', 72'; Engen 20', 45'; Rauch 67'; Ross 80' (o.g.); Clark 90+5' (o.g.)

Anoeta, San Sebastián
Attendance: 0
Referee: Tess Olofsson (Sweden)

22 August 2020
20:00

Lyon (France)	2–1	(Germany) Bayern Munich
Parris 41'; Majri 59'	Report	Simon 64'

San Mamés, Bilbao
Attendance: 0
Referee: Kateryna Monzul (Ukraine)

22 August 2020
20:00

Arsenal (England)	1–2	(France) Paris Saint-Germain
Mead 39'	Report	Katoto 15'; Bruun 77'

Anoeta, San Sebastián
Attendance: 0
Referee: Esther Staubli (Switzerland)

== Semi-finals ==
The draw for the semi-finals was held on 8 November 2019, 13:30 CET, after the completion of the quarter-final draw.

=== Overview ===
The semi-finals, originally scheduled to be played on 25 and 26 April (first legs) and 2 and 3 May 2020 (second legs), were postponed indefinitely by UEFA due to concerns over the COVID-19 pandemic in Europe. They were rescheduled as single-leg matches and played on 25 and 26 August 2020, at Anoeta, San Sebastián and San Mamés, Bilbao respectively. A draw was held on 26 June 2020 at the UEFA headquarters in Nyon, Switzerland to determine the order of matches.

Team 1	Score	Team 2
Paris Saint-Germain (France)	0–1	(France) Lyon
VfL Wolfsburg (Germany)	1–0	(Spain) Barcelona

=== Matches ===
25 August 2020
20:00

VfL Wolfsburg (Germany)	1–0	(Spain) Barcelona
Rolfö 58'	Report

Anoeta, San Sebastián
Attendance: 0
Referee: Katalin Kulcsár (Hungary)

26 August 2020
20:00

Paris Saint-Germain (France)	0–1	(France) Lyon
	Report	Renard 67'

San Mamés, Bilbao
Attendance: 0
Referee: Anastasia Pustovoitova (Russia)

== Final ==
The final, originally scheduled to be played on 24 May 2020 at Viola Park, Vienna, was postponed due to concerns over the COVID-19 pandemic in Europe. It was rescheduled to be played on 30 August 2020 at Anoeta, San Sebastián. The "home" team for the final (for administrative purposes) was determined by an additional draw held after the quarter-final and semi-final draws.

30 August 2020
20:00

VfL Wolfsburg (Germany)	1–3	(France) Lyon
Popp 58'	Report	Le Sommer 25'; Kumagai 44'; Gunnarsdóttir 88'

Anoeta, San Sebastián
Attendance: 0
Referee: Esther Staubli (Switzerland)
