= 2019–20 UEFA Women's Champions League =

19th edition of the European women's club football championship organised by UEFA

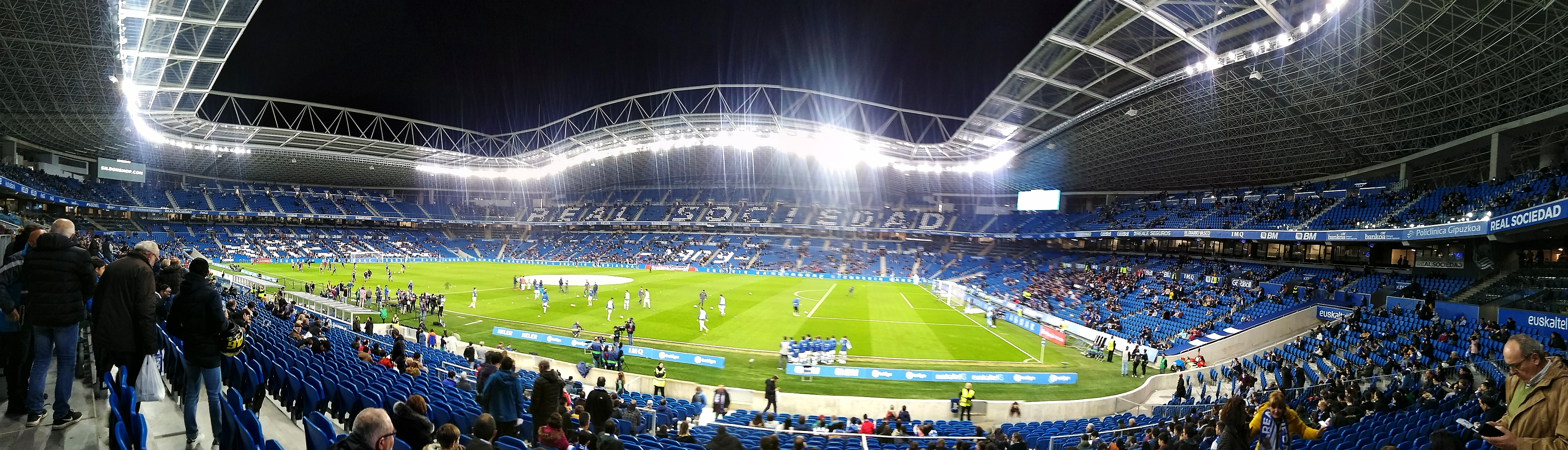
- The Anoeta Stadium in San Sebastián hosted the final

Tournament details
- Dates: Qualifying round: 7–13 August 2019; Knockout phase: 11 September 2019 – 30 August 2020
- Teams: Knockout phase: 32; Total: 62 (from 50 associations)

Final positions
- Champions: (France) Lyon (7th title)
- Runners-up: (Germany) VfL Wolfsburg

Tournament statistics
- Matches played: 115
- Goals scored: 490 (4.26 per match)
- Attendance: 97,909 (851 per match)
- Top scorer(s): (Netherlands) Vivianne Miedema (Nigeria) Emueje Ogbiagbevha (Iceland) Berglind Björg Þorvaldsdóttir; 10 goals each
- Best players: Goalkeeper: (France) Sarah Bouhaddi (Lyon); Defender: (France) Wendie Renard (Lyon); Midfielder: (Germany) Dzsenifer Marozsán (Lyon); Forward: (Denmark) Pernille Harder (VfL Wolfsburg)

The 2019–20 UEFA Women's Champions League was the 19th edition of the European women's club football championship organised by UEFA, and the 11th edition since being rebranded as the UEFA Women's Champions League.

The competition was postponed indefinitely on 17 March 2020 due to the COVID-19 pandemic in Europe. The final, originally scheduled to be played on 24 May 2020 at the Generali Arena in Vienna, Austria, was officially postponed on 23 March 2020. On 17 June 2020, UEFA announced that the remaining matches, including the quarter-finals, semi-finals and final, would be played between 21 and 30 August at San Mamés, Bilbao and Anoeta Stadium, San Sebastián in Basque Country, Spain behind closed doors, as an eight-team single-match knockout tournament, with San Sebastián hosting the final.

Lyon were the defending champions, having won the previous four editions. They successfully defended their title after defeating VfL Wolfsburg 3–1 in the final for their fifth consecutive and seventh overall title. For the first time, the video assistant referee (VAR) system was used in the competition, where it was implemented in the final.

== Association team allocation ==
The association ranking based on the UEFA women's country coefficients was used to determine the number of participating teams for each association:

- Associations 1–12 each had two teams qualify.
- All other associations, if they entered, each had one team qualify.
- The winners of the 2018–19 UEFA Women's Champions League were given an additional entry if they did not qualify for the 2019–20 UEFA Women's Champions League through their domestic league.

An association had to have an eleven-a-side women's domestic league to enter a team.

=== Association ranking ===
For the 2019–20 UEFA Women's Champions League, the associations were allocated places according to their 2018 UEFA women's country coefficients, which took into account their performance in European competitions from 2013–14 to 2017–18.

Association ranking for 2019–20 UEFA Women's Champions League

| Rank | Association | Coeff. | Teams |
|---|---|---|---|
| 1 | Germany | 83.000 | 2 |
| 2 | France | 78.000 | 2 |
| 3 | England | 59.000 | 2 |
| 4 | Sweden | 59.000 | 2 |
| 5 | Spain | 49.000 | 2 |
| 6 | Denmark | 36.500 | 2 |
| 7 | Czech Republic | 35.000 | 2 |
| 8 | Italy | 34.500 | 2 |
| 9 | Switzerland | 33.000 | 2 |
| 10 | Russia | 31.500 | 2 |
| 11 | Scotland | 25.500 | 2 |
| 12 | Austria | 25.500 | 2 |
| 13 | Netherlands | 25.000 | 1 |
| 14 | Kazakhstan | 24.000 | 1 |
| 15 | Norway | 24.000 | 1 |
| 16 | Iceland | 21.000 | 1 |
| 17 | Poland | 20.000 | 1 |
| 18 | Lithuania | 19.000 | 1 |
| 19 | Cyprus | 18.000 | 1 |

| Rank | Association | Coeff. | Teams |
|---|---|---|---|
| 20 | Serbia | 14.500 | 1 |
| 21 | Turkey | 13.000 | 1 |
| 22 | Belgium | 12.500 | 1 |
| 23 | Belarus | 12.000 | 1 |
| 24 | Romania | 12.000 | 1 |
| 25 | Hungary | 12.000 | 1 |
| 26 | Bosnia and Herzegovina | 11.000 | 1 |
| 27 | Portugal | 10.500 | 1 |
| 28 | Slovenia | 10.000 | 1 |
| 29 | Greece | 9.500 | 1 |
| 30 | Finland | 9.500 | 1 |
| 31 | Ukraine | 9.000 | 1 |
| 32 | Croatia | 8.500 | 1 |
| 33 | Republic of Ireland | 8.500 | 1 |
| 34 | Estonia | 6.500 | 1 |
| 35 | Israel | 6.000 | 1 |
| 36 | Bulgaria | 5.000 | 1 |
| 37 | Albania | 3.500 | 1 |

| Rank | Association | Coeff. | Teams |
|---|---|---|---|
| 38 | Slovakia | 3.500 | 1 |
| 39 | Faroe Islands | 3.000 | 1 |
| 40 | Montenegro | 2.000 | 1 |
| 41 | Wales | 2.000 | 1 |
| 42 | Northern Ireland | 2.000 | 1 |
| 43 | Kosovo | 1.000 | 1 |
| 44 | Latvia | 1.000 | 1 |
| 45 | Moldova | 0.500 | 1 |
| 46 | Malta | 0.500 | 1 |
| 47 | North Macedonia | 0.000 | 1 |
| 48 | Luxembourg | 0.000 | 1 |
| 49 | Georgia | 0.000 | 1 |
| NR | Armenia | — | 1 |
| NR | Andorra | — | DNE |
| NR | Azerbaijan | — | DNE |
| NR | Gibraltar | — | DNE |
| NR | Liechtenstein | — | DNE |
| NR | San Marino | — | DNE |

Notes

- TH – Additional berth for title holders
- NR – No rank (association did not enter in any of the seasons used for computing coefficients)
- DNE – Did not enter

=== Distribution ===
Unlike the men's Champions League, not every association entered a team, and so the exact number of teams entering in the qualifying round (played as mini-tournaments with four teams in each group) and knockout phase (starting from the round of 32, played as home-and-away two-legged ties except for the one-match final) could not be determined until the full entry list was known. In general, the title holders, the champions of the top 12 associations, and the runners-up of highest-ranked associations (exact number depending on the number of entries) received a bye to the round of 32. All other teams (runners-up of lowest-ranked associations and champions of associations starting from 13th) entered the qualifying round, with the group winners and a maximum of two best runners-up advancing to the round of 32.

The following is the access list for this season.

Access list for 2019–20 UEFA Women's Champions League
| | Teams entering in this round | Teams advancing from previous round |
|---|---|---|
| Qualifying round (40 teams) | 38 champions from associations 13 or lower; 2 runners-up from associations 11–12 | |
| Knockout phase (32 teams) | 12 champions from associations 1–12 (including title holders Lyon); 10 runners-up from associations 1–10 | 10 group winners from qualifying round |

=== Teams ===
A record of 62 teams from 50 of the 55 UEFA member associations entered this season's competition. Armenia sent their first team since the inaugural edition in 2001–02.

Legend

- TH: Title holders
- CH: Domestic league champions
- RU: Domestic league runners-up

Qualified teams for 2019–20 UEFA Women's Champions League
| Entry round | Teams | | | |
|---|---|---|---|---|
| Round of 32 | (Germany) VfL Wolfsburg (CH) | (Germany) Bayern Munich (RU) | (France) Lyon (CH)^{TH} | (France) Paris Saint-Germain (RU) |
| Round of 32 | (England) Arsenal (CH) | (England) Manchester City (RU) | (Sweden) Piteå (CH) | (Sweden) Kopparbergs/Göteborg (RU) |
| Round of 32 | (Spain) Atlético Madrid (CH) | (Spain) Barcelona (RU) | (Denmark) Brøndby (CH) | (Denmark) Fortuna Hjørring (RU) |
| Round of 32 | (Czech Republic) Sparta Prague (CH) | (Czech Republic) Slavia Prague (RU) | (Italy) Juventus (CH) | (Italy) Fiorentina (RU) |
| Round of 32 | (Switzerland) Zurich (CH) | (Switzerland) Lugano (RU) | (Russia) Ryazan-VDV (CH) | (Russia) Chertanovo Moscow (RU) |
| Round of 32 | (Scotland) Glasgow City (CH) | (Austria) St. Pölten (CH) | | |
| Qualifying round | (Scotland) Hibernian (RU) | (Austria) Sturm Graz (RU) | (Netherlands) Twente (CH) | (Kazakhstan) BIIK Kazygurt (CH) |
| Qualifying round | (Norway) LSK Kvinner (CH) | (Iceland) Breiðablik (CH) | (Poland) Górnik Łęczna (CH) | (Lithuania) Gintra Universitetas (CH) |
| Qualifying round | (Cyprus) Apollon Limassol (CH) | (Serbia) Spartak Subotica (CH) | (Turkey) Beşiktaş (CH) | (Belgium) Anderlecht (CH) |
| Qualifying round | (Belarus) FC Minsk (CH) | (Romania) Olimpia Cluj (CH) | (Hungary) Ferencváros (CH) | (Bosnia and Herzegovina) SFK 2000 (CH) |
| Qualifying round | (Portugal) SC Braga (CH) | (Slovenia) Pomurje (CH) | (Greece) PAOK (CH) | (Finland) PK-35 Vantaa (CH) |
| Qualifying round | (Ukraine) Zhytlobud-1 Kharkiv (CH) | (Croatia) Split (CH) | (Republic of Ireland) Wexford Youths (CH) | (Estonia) Flora (CH) |
| Qualifying round | (Israel) ASA Tel Aviv (CH) | (Bulgaria) NSA Sofia (CH) | (Albania) Vllaznia (CH) | (Slovakia) Slovan Bratislava (CH) |
| Qualifying round | (Faroe Islands) EB/Streymur/Skála (CH) | (Montenegro) Breznica Pljevlja (CH) | (Wales) Cardiff Met. (CH) | (Northern Ireland) Linfield (CH) |
| Qualifying round | (Kosovo) Mitrovica (CH) | (Latvia) Rīgas FS (CH) | (Moldova) Agarista-ȘS Anenii Noi (CH) | (Malta) Birkirkara (CH) |
| Qualifying round | (North Macedonia) Dragon 2014 (CH) | (Luxembourg) Bettembourg (CH) | (Georgia (country)) Tbilisi Nike (CH) | (Armenia) Alashkert (CH) |

== Round and draw dates ==
The schedule of the competition was as follows (all draws were held at the UEFA headquarters in Nyon, Switzerland).

The competition was postponed indefinitely on 17 March 2020 due to the COVID-19 pandemic in Europe. The final, originally scheduled to be played on 24 May 2020 at the Viola Park, Vienna, was officially postponed on 23 March 2020. A working group was set up by UEFA to decide the calendar of the remainder of the season, with the final decision made at the UEFA Executive Committee meeting on 17 June 2020.

Schedule for 2019–20 UEFA Women's Champions League
| Round | Draw | First leg | Second leg |
|---|---|---|---|
| Qualifying round | 21 June 2019 | 7, 10 & 13 August 2019 | |
| Round of 32 | 16 August 2019 | 11–12 September 2019 | 25–26 September 2019 |
| Round of 16 | 30 September 2019 | 16–17 October 2019 | 30–31 October 2019 |
| Quarter-finals | 8 November 2019 | 21–22 August 2020 at San Mamés, Bilbao and Anoeta Stadium, San Sebastián (Note: Quarter-finals originally scheduled for 24–25 March (first legs) and 1–2 April 2020 (second legs), but postponed, relocated and changed to single-leg format due to COVID-19 pandemic in Europe) | |
| Semi-finals | 8 November 2019 | 25–26 August 2020 at San Mamés, Bilbao and Anoeta Stadium, San Sebastián (Note: Semi-final originally scheduled for 25–26 April (first legs) and 2–3 May 2020 (second legs), but postponed, relocated and changed to single-leg format due to COVID-19 pandemic in Europe) | |
| Final | 8 November 2019 | 30 August 2020 at Anoeta Stadium, San Sebastián (Note: Final originally scheduled for 24 May 2020 at Viola Park, Vienna, but postponed and relocated due to COVID-19 pandemic in Europe) | |

== Qualifying round ==
The draw of the qualifying round was held at the UEFA headquarters in Nyon, Switzerland on 21 June 2019, 13:30 CEST. The 40 teams were allocated into four seeding positions based on their UEFA women's club coefficients at the beginning of the season. They were drawn into ten groups of four containing one team from each of the four seeding positions. First, the ten teams which were pre-selected as hosts were drawn from their own designated pot and allocated to their respective group as per their seeding positions. Next, the remaining 30 teams were drawn from their respective pot which are allocated according to their seeding positions.

In each group, teams played against each other in a round-robin mini-tournament at the pre-selected hosts. The ten group winners advanced to the round of 32 to join the 22 teams which received a bye. The matches were played on 7, 10 and 13 August 2019.

Tiebreakers
Teams are ranked according to points (3 points for a win, 1 point for a draw, 0 points for a loss), and if tied on points, the following tiebreaking criteria are applied, in the order given, to determine the rankings (Regulations Articles 15.01 and 15.02):
1. Points in head-to-head matches among tied teams;
2. Goal difference in head-to-head matches among tied teams;
3. Goals scored in head-to-head matches among tied teams;
4. If more than two teams are tied, and after applying all head-to-head criteria above, a subset of teams are still tied, all head-to-head criteria above are reapplied exclusively to this subset of teams;
5. Goal difference in all group matches;
6. Goals scored in all group matches;
7. Penalty shoot-out if only two teams have the same number of points, and they met in the last round of the group and are tied after applying all criteria above (not used if more than two teams have the same number of points, or if their rankings are not relevant for qualification for the next stage);
8. Disciplinary points (red card = 3 points, yellow card = 1 point, expulsion for two yellow cards in one match = 3 points);
9. UEFA club coefficient.

=== Group 1 ===
| Pos | Team | Pld | W | D | L | GF | GA | GD | Pts | Qualification | BRE | SFK | ASA | DRA |
|---|---|---|---|---|---|---|---|---|---|---|---|---|---|---|
| 1 | (Iceland) Breiðablik | 3 | 3 | 0 | 0 | 18 | 2 | +16 | 9 | Knockout phase | — | 3–1 | — | 11–0 |
| 2 | (Bosnia and Herzegovina) SFK 2000 (H) | 3 | 2 | 0 | 1 | 7 | 3 | +4 | 6 | | — | — | 1–0 | 5–0 |
| 3 | (Israel) ASA Tel Aviv | 3 | 1 | 0 | 2 | 8 | 5 | +3 | 3 | | 1–4 | — | — | — |
| 4 | (North Macedonia) Dragon 2014 | 3 | 0 | 0 | 3 | 0 | 23 | −23 | 0 | | — | — | 0–7 | — |

Source: UEFA
(H) Hosts

=== Group 2 ===
| Pos | Team | Pld | W | D | L | GF | GA | GD | Pts | Qualification | MIT | BRE | CLU | SOF |
|---|---|---|---|---|---|---|---|---|---|---|---|---|---|---|
| 1 | (Kosovo) Mitrovica | 3 | 3 | 0 | 0 | 5 | 1 | +4 | 9 | Knockout phase | — | 1–0 | — | — |
| 2 | (Montenegro) Breznica Pljevlja (H) | 3 | 1 | 1 | 1 | 7 | 7 | 0 | 4 | | — | — | — | 4–4 |
| 3 | (Romania) Olimpia Cluj | 3 | 1 | 0 | 2 | 6 | 7 | −1 | 3 | | 1–2 | 2–3 | — | — |
| 4 | (Bulgaria) NSA Sofia | 3 | 0 | 1 | 2 | 6 | 9 | −3 | 1 | | 0–2 | — | 2–3 | — |

Source: UEFA
(H) Hosts

=== Group 3 ===
| Pos | Team | Pld | W | D | L | GF | GA | GD | Pts | Qualification | HIB | CAR | POM | TBI |
|---|---|---|---|---|---|---|---|---|---|---|---|---|---|---|
| 1 | (Scotland) Hibernian | 3 | 3 | 0 | 0 | 7 | 2 | +5 | 9 | Knockout phase | — | 2–1 | — | 3–0 |
| 2 | (Wales) Cardiff Met. | 3 | 2 | 0 | 1 | 7 | 3 | +4 | 6 | | — | — | 1–0 | — |
| 3 | (Slovenia) Pomurje (H) | 3 | 1 | 0 | 2 | 5 | 3 | +2 | 3 | | 1–2 | — | — | 4–0 |
| 4 | (Georgia (country)) Tbilisi Nike | 3 | 0 | 0 | 3 | 1 | 12 | −11 | 0 | | — | 1–5 | — | — |

Source: UEFA
(H) Hosts

=== Group 4 ===
| Pos | Team | Pld | W | D | L | GF | GA | GD | Pts | Qualification | MIN | KHA | SPL | BET |
|---|---|---|---|---|---|---|---|---|---|---|---|---|---|---|
| 1 | (Belarus) FC Minsk | 3 | 3 | 0 | 0 | 16 | 1 | +15 | 9 | Knockout phase | — | — | 2–1 | 12–0 |
| 2 | (Ukraine) Zhytlobud-1 Kharkiv (H) | 3 | 2 | 0 | 1 | 9 | 4 | +5 | 6 | | 0–2 | — | — | 6–0 |
| 3 | (Croatia) Split | 3 | 1 | 0 | 2 | 10 | 7 | +3 | 3 | | — | 2–3 | — | — |
| 4 | (Luxembourg) Bettembourg | 3 | 0 | 0 | 3 | 2 | 25 | −23 | 0 | | — | — | 2–7 | — |

Source: UEFA
(H) Hosts

=== Group 5 ===
| Pos | Team | Pld | W | D | L | GF | GA | GD | Pts | Qualification | SUB | FER | BRA | ANE |
|---|---|---|---|---|---|---|---|---|---|---|---|---|---|---|
| 1 | (Serbia) Spartak Subotica | 3 | 2 | 1 | 0 | 21 | 2 | +19 | 7 | Knockout phase | — | — | 7–0 | 12–0 |
| 2 | (Hungary) Ferencváros | 3 | 2 | 1 | 0 | 7 | 3 | +4 | 7 | | 2–2 | — | — | 2–0 |
| 3 | (Slovakia) Slovan Bratislava (H) | 3 | 1 | 0 | 2 | 2 | 10 | −8 | 3 | | — | 1–3 | — | — |
| 4 | (Moldova) Agarista-ȘS Anenii Noi | 3 | 0 | 0 | 3 | 0 | 15 | −15 | 0 | | — | — | 0–1 | — |

Source: UEFA
(H) Hosts

=== Group 6 ===
| Pos | Team | Pld | W | D | L | GF | GA | GD | Pts | Qualification | KAZ | VAN | FLO | EBS |
|---|---|---|---|---|---|---|---|---|---|---|---|---|---|---|
| 1 | (Kazakhstan) BIIK Kazygurt | 3 | 3 | 0 | 0 | 15 | 1 | +14 | 9 | Knockout phase | — | — | 2–0 | 9–0 |
| 2 | (Finland) PK-35 Vantaa | 3 | 2 | 0 | 1 | 9 | 6 | +3 | 6 | | 1–4 | — | — | 5–0 |
| 3 | (Estonia) Flora (H) | 3 | 1 | 0 | 2 | 4 | 5 | −1 | 3 | | — | 2–3 | — | — |
| 4 | (Faroe Islands) EB/Streymur/Skála | 3 | 0 | 0 | 3 | 0 | 16 | −16 | 0 | | — | — | 0–2 | — |

Source: UEFA
(H) Hosts

=== Group 7 ===
| Pos | Team | Pld | W | D | L | GF | GA | GD | Pts | Qualification | BRA | LIM | GRA | RIG |
|---|---|---|---|---|---|---|---|---|---|---|---|---|---|---|
| 1 | (Portugal) Braga | 3 | 3 | 0 | 0 | 11 | 0 | +11 | 9 | Knockout phase | — | — | 2–0 | — |
| 2 | (Cyprus) Apollon Limassol | 3 | 2 | 0 | 1 | 17 | 3 | +14 | 6 | | 0–1 | — | — | 10–0 |
| 3 | (Austria) Sturm Graz | 3 | 1 | 0 | 2 | 6 | 9 | −3 | 3 | | — | 2–7 | — | 4–0 |
| 4 | (Latvia) Rīgas FS (H) | 3 | 0 | 0 | 3 | 0 | 22 | −22 | 0 | | 0–8 | — | — | — |

Source: UEFA
(H) Hosts

=== Group 8 ===
| Pos | Team | Pld | W | D | L | GF | GA | GD | Pts | Qualification | AND | LSK | LIN | PAO |
|---|---|---|---|---|---|---|---|---|---|---|---|---|---|---|
| 1 | (Belgium) Anderlecht (H) | 3 | 3 | 0 | 0 | 11 | 3 | +8 | 9 | Knockout phase | — | — | — | 5–0 |
| 2 | (Norway) LSK Kvinner | 3 | 2 | 0 | 1 | 7 | 3 | +4 | 6 | | 2–3 | — | 4–0 | — |
| 3 | (Northern Ireland) Linfield | 3 | 1 | 0 | 2 | 4 | 9 | −5 | 3 | | 1–3 | — | — | — |
| 4 | (Greece) PAOK | 3 | 0 | 0 | 3 | 2 | 9 | −7 | 0 | | — | 0–1 | 2–3 | — |

Source: UEFA
(H) Hosts

=== Group 9 ===
| Pos | Team | Pld | W | D | L | GF | GA | GD | Pts | Qualification | TWE | BES | GOR | ALA |
|---|---|---|---|---|---|---|---|---|---|---|---|---|---|---|
| 1 | (Netherlands) Twente (H) | 3 | 2 | 1 | 0 | 12 | 2 | +10 | 7 | Knockout phase | — | 2–2 | — | 8–0 |
| 2 | (Turkey) Beşiktaş | 3 | 1 | 2 | 0 | 6 | 3 | +3 | 5 | | — | — | 1–1 | — |
| 3 | (Poland) Górnik Łęczna | 3 | 1 | 1 | 1 | 14 | 3 | +11 | 4 | | 0–2 | — | — | 13–0 |
| 4 | (Armenia) Alashkert | 3 | 0 | 0 | 3 | 0 | 24 | −24 | 0 | | — | 0–3 | — | — |

Source: UEFA
(H) Hosts

=== Group 10 ===
| Pos | Team | Pld | W | D | L | GF | GA | GD | Pts | Qualification | VLL | WEX | GIN | BIR |
|---|---|---|---|---|---|---|---|---|---|---|---|---|---|---|
| 1 | (Albania) Vllaznia | 3 | 2 | 1 | 0 | 5 | 2 | +3 | 7 | Knockout phase | — | — | 1–1 | 1–0 |
| 2 | (Republic of Ireland) Wexford Youths | 3 | 2 | 0 | 1 | 10 | 6 | +4 | 6 | | 1–3 | — | — | — |
| 3 | (Lithuania) Gintra Universitetas (H) | 3 | 1 | 1 | 1 | 3 | 3 | 0 | 4 | | — | 1–2 | — | 1–0 |
| 4 | (Malta) Birkirkara | 3 | 0 | 0 | 3 | 2 | 9 | −7 | 0 | | — | 2–7 | — | — |

Source: UEFA
(H) Hosts

== Knockout phase ==
Each tie in the knockout phase, apart from the final, was played over two legs, with each team playing one leg at home. The team that scored more goals on aggregate over the two legs advanced to the next round. If the aggregate score was level, the away goals rule was applied, i.e. the team that scored more goals away from home over the two legs advanced. If away goals were also equal, then extra time was played. The away goals rule was again applied after extra time, i.e. if there were goals scored during extra time and the aggregate score was still level, the visiting team advanced by virtue of more away goals scored. If no goals were scored during extra time, the tie was decided by a penalty shoot-out. In the final, which was played as a single match, if the score was level at the end of normal time, extra time would be played, followed by penalty shoot-out if the score remained tied.

The mechanism of the draws for each round was as follows:

- In the draw for the round of 32, the sixteen teams with the highest UEFA women's club coefficients were seeded (with the title holders being the automatic top seed), and the other sixteen teams were unseeded. The seeded teams were drawn against the unseeded teams, with the seeded teams hosting the second leg. Teams from the same association could not be drawn against each other.
- In the draw for the round of 16, the eight teams with the highest UEFA women's club coefficients were seeded (with the title holders being the automatic top seed should they qualify), and the other eight teams were unseeded. The seeded teams were drawn against the unseeded teams, with the order of legs decided by draw. Teams from the same association could not be drawn against each other.
- In the draws for the quarter-finals and semi-finals, there were no seedings, and teams from the same association could be drawn against each other. As the draws for the quarter-finals and semi-finals were held together before the quarter-finals were played, the identity of the teams in the semi-finals were not known at the time of the draw. A draw was also held to determine the "home" team for the final (for administrative purposes as it was played at a neutral venue).

On 17 June 2020, UEFA announced that due to the COVID-19 pandemic in Europe, the final stages of the competition would feature a format change. The quarter-finals, semi-finals and final would be played in a single-leg format from 21 to 30 August 2020 in Bilbao and San Sebastián, Spain. The matches were played behind closed doors.

=== Bracket ===
Round of 32
(Sweden) Piteå | 0 | 1 | 1
(Denmark) Brøndby | 1 | 1 | 2
(Russia) Chertanovo Moscow | 0 | 1 | 1
(Scotland) Glasgow City | 1 | 4 | 5
(Kosovo) Mitrovica | 0 | 0 | 0
(Germany) VfL Wolfsburg | 10 | 5 | 15
(Austria) St. Pölten | 2 | 2 | 4
(Netherlands) Twente | 4 | 1 | 5
(Switzerland) Lugano | 1 | 0 | 1
(England) Manchester City | 7 | 4 | 11
(Serbia) Spartak Subotica | 2 | 1 | 3
(Spain) Atlético Madrid | 3 | 1 | 4
(Italy) Juventus | 0 | 1 | 1
(Spain) Barcelona | 2 | 2 | 4
(Belarus) FC Minsk | 1 | 3 | 4
(Switzerland) Zürich | 0 | 1 | 1
(Scotland) Hibernian | 1 | 1 | 2
(Czech Republic) Slavia Prague | 4 | 5 | 9
(Italy) Fiorentina | 0 | 0 | 0
(England) Arsenal | 4 | 2 | 6
(Iceland) Breiðablik | 3 | 1 | 4
(Czech Republic) Sparta Prague | 2 | 0 | 2
(Portugal) Braga | 0 | 0 | 0
(France) Paris Saint-Germain | 7 | 0 | 7
(Albania) Vllaznia | 0 | 0 | 0
(Denmark) Fortuna Hjørring | 1 | 2 | 3
(Russia) Ryazan-VDV | 0 | 0 | 0
(France) Lyon | 9 | 7 | 16
(Belgium) Anderlecht | 1 | 0 | 1
(Kazakhstan) BIIK Kazygurt | 1 | 2 | 3
(Sweden) Kopparbergs/Göteborg | 1 | 1 | 2
(Germany) Bayern Munich (a) | 2 | 0 | 2

Round of 16
(Denmark) Brøndby | 0 | 2 | 2 (1)
(Scotland) Glasgow City (p) | 2 | 0 | 2 (3)
(Germany) VfL Wolfsburg | 6 | 1 | 7
(Netherlands) Twente | 0 | 0 | 0
(England) Manchester City | 1 | 1 | 2
(Spain) Atlético Madrid | 1 | 2 | 3
(Spain) Barcelona | 5 | 3 | 8
(Belarus) FC Minsk | 0 | 1 | 1
(Czech Republic) Slavia Prague | 2 | 0 | 2
(England) Arsenal | 5 | 8 | 13
(Iceland) Breiðablik | 0 | 1 | 1
(France) Paris Saint-Germain | 4 | 3 | 7
(Denmark) Fortuna Hjørring | 0 | 0 | 0
(France) Lyon | 4 | 7 | 11
(Kazakhstan) BIIK Kazygurt | 0 | 0 | 0
(Germany) Bayern Munich | 5 | 2 | 7

Quarter-finals
21 August – San Sebastián
(Scotland) Glasgow City | 1
(Germany) VfL Wolfsburg | 9
21 August – Bilbao
(Spain) Atlético Madrid | 0
(Spain) Barcelona | 1
22 August – San Sebastián
(England) Arsenal | 1
(France) Paris Saint-Germain | 2
22 August – Bilbao
(France) Lyon | 2
(Germany) Bayern Munich | 1

Semi-finals
25 August – San Sebastián
(Germany) VfL Wolfsburg | 1
(Spain) Barcelona | 0
26 August – Bilbao
(France) Paris Saint-Germain | 0
(France) Lyon | 1

Final
30 August – San Sebastián
(Germany) VfL Wolfsburg | 1
(France) Lyon | 3

=== Round of 32 ===
The draw for the round of 32 was held on 16 August 2019, 13:30 CEST. The first legs were played on 11 and 12 September, and the second legs on 25 and 26 September 2019.

| Team 1 | Agg. | Team 2 | 1st leg | 2nd leg |
|---|---|---|---|---|
| Juventus (Italy) | 1–4 | (Spain) Barcelona | 0–2 | 1–2 |
| Hibernian (Scotland) | 2–9 | (Czech Republic) Slavia Prague | 1–4 | 1–5 |
| Spartak Subotica (Serbia) | 3–4 | (Spain) Atlético Madrid | 2–3 | 1–1 |
| Braga (Portugal) | 0–7 | (France) Paris Saint-Germain | 0–7 | 0–0 |
| Vllaznia (Albania) | 0–3 | (Denmark) Fortuna Hjørring | 0–1 | 0–2 |
| Chertanovo Moscow (Russia) | 1–5 | (Scotland) Glasgow City | 0–1 | 1–4 |
| Ryazan-VDV (Russia) | 0–16 | (France) Lyon | 0–9 | 0–7 |
| Fiorentina (Italy) | 0–6 (Note: Order of legs reversed after original draw.) | (England) Arsenal | 0–4 | 0–2 |
| Kopparbergs/Göteborg (Sweden) | 2–2 (a) | (Germany) Bayern Munich | 1–2 | 1–0 |
| St. Pölten (Austria) | 4–5 | (Netherlands) Twente | 2–4 | 2–1 |
| Anderlecht (Belgium) | 1–3 | (Kazakhstan) BIIK Kazygurt | 1–1 | 0–2 |
| Breiðablik (Iceland) | 4–2 | (Czech Republic) Sparta Prague | 3–2 | 1–0 |
| Mitrovica (Kosovo) | 0–15 | (Germany) VfL Wolfsburg | 0–10 | 0–5 |
| Piteå (Sweden) | 1–2 | (Denmark) Brøndby | 0–1 | 1–1 |
| Lugano (Switzerland) | 1–11 | (England) Manchester City | 1–7 | 0–4 |
| FC Minsk (Belarus) | 4–1 | (Switzerland) Zürich | 1–0 | 3–1 |

=== Round of 16 ===
The draw for the round of 16 was held on 30 September 2019, 13:30 CEST. The first legs were played on 16 and 17 October, and the second legs on 30 and 31 October 2019.

| Team 1 | Agg. | Team 2 | 1st leg | 2nd leg |
|---|---|---|---|---|
| Brøndby (Denmark) | 2–2 (1–3 p) (Note: Order of legs reversed after original draw.) | (Scotland) Glasgow City | 0–2 | 2–0 (a.e.t.) |
| Barcelona (Spain) | 8–1 | (Belarus) FC Minsk | 5–0 | 3–1 |
| BIIK Kazygurt (Kazakhstan) | 0–7 | (Germany) Bayern Munich | 0–5 | 0–2 |
| Fortuna Hjørring (Denmark) | 0–11 | (France) Lyon | 0–4 | 0–7 |
| Breiðablik (Iceland) | 1–7 | (France) Paris Saint-Germain | 0–4 | 1–3 |
| VfL Wolfsburg (Germany) | 7–0 | (Netherlands) Twente | 6–0 | 1–0 |
| Slavia Prague (Czech Republic) | 2–13 | (England) Arsenal | 2–5 | 0–8 |
| Manchester City (England) | 2–3 | (Spain) Atlético Madrid | 1–1 | 1–2 |

=== Quarter-finals ===
The draw for the quarter-finals was held on 8 November 2019, 13:30 CET. The quarter-finals, originally scheduled to be played on 25 March (first legs) and 1 April 2020 (second legs), were postponed indefinitely by UEFA due to concerns over the COVID-19 pandemic in Europe. They were rescheduled as single-leg matches on 21 and 22 August 2020, with two matches each (one on each day) played at San Mamés, Bilbao and Anoeta, San Sebastián. A draw was held on 26 June 2020 at the UEFA headquarters in Nyon, Switzerland to determine the order of matches.

| Team 1 | Score | Team 2 |
|---|---|---|
| Atlético Madrid (Spain) | 0–1 | (Spain) Barcelona |
| Lyon (France) | 2–1 | (Germany) Bayern Munich |
| Glasgow City (Scotland) | 1–9 | (Germany) VfL Wolfsburg |
| Arsenal (England) | 1–2 | (France) Paris Saint-Germain |

=== Semi-finals ===
The draw for the semi-finals was held on 8 November 2019, 13:30 CET, after the completion of the quarter-final draw. The semi-finals, originally scheduled to be played on 25 and 26 April (first legs) and 2 and 3 May 2020 (second legs), were postponed indefinitely by UEFA due to concerns over the COVID-19 pandemic in Europe. They were rescheduled as single-leg matches and played on 25 and 26 August 2020, at Anoeta, San Sebastián and San Mamés, Bilbao respectively. A draw was held on 26 June 2020 at the UEFA headquarters in Nyon, Switzerland to determine the order of matches.

| Team 1 | Score | Team 2 |
|---|---|---|
| Paris Saint-Germain (France) | 0–1 | (France) Lyon |
| VfL Wolfsburg (Germany) | 1–0 | (Spain) Barcelona |

=== Final ===
The final, originally scheduled to be played on 24 May 2020 at Viola Park, Vienna, was postponed due to concerns over the COVID-19 pandemic in Europe. It was rescheduled to be played on 30 August 2020 at Anoeta, San Sebastián. The "home" team for the final (for administrative purposes) was determined by an additional draw held after the quarter-final and semi-final draws.

30 August 2020
20:00 UTC+2

| VfL Wolfsburg (Germany) | 1–3 | (France) Lyon |
|---|---|---|
| Popp 58' | Report | Le Sommer 25'; Kumagai 44'; Gunnarsdóttir 88' |

Anoeta, San Sebastián
Attendance: 0 (Note: The remainder of the competition, held in August 2020, was played behind closed doors due to the COVID-19 pandemic in Europe.)
Referee: Esther Staubli (Switzerland)

== Statistics ==
=== Top goalscorers ===
There were 490 goals scored in 115 matches, with an average of 4.26 goals per match.

Goals scored in qualifying round counts toward the topscorer award.

| Rank | Player | Team | Goals | | |
| Rank | Player | Team | Qual. | Tourn. | Total |
|---|---|---|---|---|---|
| 1 | (Netherlands) Vivianne Miedema | (England) Arsenal | — | 10 | 10 |
| 1 | (Nigeria) Emueje Ogbiagbevha | (Belarus) Minsk | 6 | 4 | 10 |
| 1 | (Iceland) Berglind Björg Þorvaldsdóttir | (Iceland) Breiðablik | 6 | 4 | 10 |
| 4 | (Denmark) Pernille Harder | (Germany) VfL Wolfsburg | — | 9 | 9 |
| 4 | (Norway) Ada Hegerberg | (France) Lyon | — | 9 | 9 |
| 4 | (Netherlands) Fenna Kalma | (Netherlands) Twente | 5 | 4 | 9 |
| 7 | (Canada) Kayla Adamek | (Serbia) Spartak Subotica | 4 | 1 | 5 |
| 7 | (Canada) Janine Beckie | (England) Manchester City | — | 5 | 5 |
| 7 | (Serbia) Tijana Filipović | (Serbia) Spartak Subotica | 5 | 0 | 5 |
| 7 | (Cyprus) Krystyna Freda | (Cyprus) Apollon Limassol | 5 | — | 5 |
| 7 | (Georgia (country)) Gulnara Gabelia | (Kazakhstan) BIIK Kazygurt | 5 | 0 | 5 |
| 7 | (England) Rio Hardy | (Cyprus) Apollon Limassol | 5 | — | 5 |
| 7 | (France) Marie-Antoinette Katoto | (France) Paris Saint-Germain | — | 5 | 5 |
| 7 | (Bulgaria) Velina Koshuleva | (Bulgaria) NSA Sofia | 5 | — | 5 |
| 7 | (Czech Republic) Tereza Kožárová | (Czech Republic) Slavia Praha | — | 5 | 5 |
| 7 | (France) Eugénie Le Sommer | (France) Lyon | — | 5 | 5 |
| 7 | (Serbia) Tijana Matić | (Serbia) Spartak Subotica | 4 | 1 | 5 |
| 7 | (France) Wendie Renard | (France) Lyon | — | 5 | 5 |

Source: Soccerway

Notes

- — Denotes the team did not participate in this stage.

=== Squad of the season ===
The following players were named in the squad of the season by the UEFA's technical observers:

| Pos | Player | Team(s) |
|---|---|---|
| GK | (France) Sarah Bouhaddi | (France) Lyon |
| GK | (Chile) Christiane Endler | (France) Paris Saint-Germain |
| GK | (Spain) Sandra Paños | (Spain) Barcelona |
| DF | (England) Lucy Bronze | (France) Lyon |
| DF | (Poland) Paulina Dudek | (France) Paris Saint-Germain |
| DF | (Germany) Kathrin Hendrich | (Germany) Bayern Munich (Germany) VfL Wolfsburg |
| DF | (Netherlands) Dominique Janssen | (Germany) VfL Wolfsburg |
| DF | (France) Sakina Karchaoui | (France) Lyon |
| DF | (France) Wendie Renard | (France) Lyon |
| MF | (Norway) Ingrid Syrstad Engen | (Germany) VfL Wolfsburg |
| MF | (France) Kheira Hamraoui | (Spain) Barcelona |
| MF | (Germany) Svenja Huth | (Germany) VfL Wolfsburg |
| MF | (Japan) Saki Kumagai | (France) Lyon |
| MF | (Scotland) Kim Little | (England) Arsenal |
| MF | (France) Amel Majri | (France) Lyon |
| MF | (Germany) Dzsenifer Marozsán | (France) Lyon |
| MF | (Germany) Alexandra Popp | (Germany) VfL Wolfsburg |
| FW | (France) Delphine Cascarino | (France) Lyon |
| FW | (France) Kadidiatou Diani | (France) Paris Saint-Germain |
| FW | (Norway) Caroline Graham Hansen | (Spain) Barcelona |
| FW | (Denmark) Pernille Harder | (Germany) VfL Wolfsburg |
| FW | (Spain) Jennifer Hermoso | (Spain) Barcelona |
| FW | (France) Marie-Antoinette Katoto | (France) Paris Saint-Germain |

=== Players of the season ===
For the first time, positional awards were awarded in the Women's Champions League for best goalkeeper, defender, midfielder and forward of the competition. Votes were cast for players of the season by coaches of the eight teams who participated in the final tournament in Spain, together with 20 journalists selected by the European Sports Media (ESM) group who specialize in women's football. The coaches were not allowed to vote for players from their own teams. Jury members selected their top three players, with the first receiving five points, the second three and the third one. The shortlist of the top three players was announced on 17 September 2020. The award winners were announced and presented during the 2020–21 UEFA Champions League group stage draw in Switzerland on 1 October 2020.

==== Goalkeeper of the season ====
| Rank | Player | Team(s) | Points |
Shortlist of top three
| 1 | (France) Sarah Bouhaddi | (France) Lyon | 100 |
| 2 | (Chile) Christiane Endler | (France) Paris Saint-Germain | 60 |
| 3 | (Spain) Sandra Paños | (Spain) Barcelona | 39 |
Players ranked 4–10
| 4 | (Germany) Friederike Abt | (Germany) VfL Wolfsburg | 10 |
| 5 | (Sweden) Hedvig Lindahl | (Germany) VfL Wolfsburg (Spain) Atlético Madrid | 9 |
| 6 | (Germany) Laura Benkarth | (Germany) Bayern Munich | 8 |
| 7 | (Austria) Manuela Zinsberger | (England) Arsenal | 4 |
| 8 | (England) Ellie Roebuck | (England) Manchester City | 3 |
| 9 | (France) Pauline Peyraud-Magnin | (England) Arsenal | 1 |
| 9 | (Netherlands) Sari van Veenendaal | (Spain) Atlético Madrid | 1 |

==== Defender of the season ====
| Rank | Player | Team(s) | Points |
Shortlist of top three
| 1 | (France) Wendie Renard | (France) Lyon | 102 |
| 2 | (England) Lucy Bronze | (France) Lyon | 85 |
| 3 | (Germany) Lena Goeßling | (Germany) VfL Wolfsburg | 9 |
Players ranked 4–10
| 4 | (France) Sakina Karchaoui | (France) Lyon | 8 |
| 5 | (Netherlands) Dominique Janssen | (Germany) VfL Wolfsburg | 7 |
| 6 | (Spain) Irene Paredes | (France) Paris Saint-Germain | 6 |
| 7 | (Germany) Kathrin Hendrich | (Germany) Bayern Munich (Germany) VfL Wolfsburg | 5 |
| 7 | (Spain) Mapi León | (Spain) Barcelona | 5 |
| 9 | (Poland) Paulina Dudek | (France) Paris Saint-Germain | 3 |
| 9 | (Germany) Carolin Simon | (Germany) Bayern Munich | 3 |

==== Midfielder of the season ====
| Rank | Player | Team(s) | Points |
Shortlist of top three
| 1 | (Germany) Dzsenifer Marozsán | (France) Lyon | 66 |
| 2 | (Germany) Alexandra Popp | (Germany) VfL Wolfsburg | 30 |
| 3 | (Iceland) Sara Björk Gunnarsdóttir | (Germany) VfL Wolfsburg (France) Lyon | 19 |
Players ranked 4–10
| 4 | (Japan) Saki Kumagai | (France) Lyon | 17 |
| 4 | (France) Amel Majri | (France) Lyon | 17 |
| 6 | (France) Delphine Cascarino | (France) Lyon | 14 |
| 7 | (Spain) Alexia Putellas | (Spain) Barcelona | 10 |
| 8 | (Norway) Ingrid Syrstad Engen | (Germany) VfL Wolfsburg | 8 |
| 8 | (France) Amandine Henry | (France) Lyon | 8 |
| 10 | (Norway) Caroline Graham Hansen | (Spain) Barcelona | 6 |
| 10 | (Scotland) Kim Little | (England) Arsenal | 6 |
| 10 | (Germany) Lina Magull | (Germany) Bayern Munich | 6 |

==== Forward of the season ====
| Rank | Player | Team(s) | Points |
Shortlist of top three
| 1 | (Denmark) Pernille Harder | (Germany) VfL Wolfsburg | 93 |
| 2 | (France) Delphine Cascarino | (France) Lyon | 32 |
| 3 | (Netherlands) Vivianne Miedema | (England) Arsenal | 31 |
Players ranked 4–10
| 4 | (France) Eugénie Le Sommer | (France) Lyon | 23 |
| 5 | (Norway) Ada Hegerberg | (France) Lyon | 15 |
| 6 | (France) Marie-Antoinette Katoto | (France) Paris Saint-Germain | 10 |
| 7 | (Poland) Ewa Pajor | (Germany) VfL Wolfsburg | 7 |
| 8 | (Norway) Caroline Graham Hansen | (Spain) Barcelona | 6 |
| 8 | (Spain) Jennifer Hermoso | (Spain) Barcelona | 6 |
| 10 | (Sweden) Fridolina Rolfö | (Germany) VfL Wolfsburg | 5 |

== See also ==
- 2019 Copa Libertadores Femenina
- 2019 AFC Women's Club Championship
- 2019–20 UEFA Champions League
