= Cara Curtin =

American soccer player

Personal information
- Date of birth: May 19, 1992 (age 34)
- Place of birth: Santa Rosa, California, United States
- Position: Forward

College career
Years	Team	Apps	(Gls)
2010–2011	Santa Rosa Bear Cubs		
2012–2013	Sonoma State Seawolves	42	(24)

Senior career*
Years	Team	Apps	(Gls)
- Sacramento Storm
2016–2019	FF Lugano 1976	90	(61)
2019–2020	Valencia	15	(0)
2020–2022	Zaragoza	54	(14)
- * Club domestic league appearances and goals

Cara Curtin (born May 19, 1992) is an American soccer player who has played previously played for clubs such as FF Lugano 1976 in Switzerland and Valencia and Zaragoza in Spain.

== College career ==
=== Santa Rosa Bear Cubs ===
Along with her twin sister Lauren, Curtin played as a freshman and sophomore for Santa Rosa Bear Cubs. In 2010, she was the team's top scorer, leading them to win the Big Eight Conference. In December 2011, Curtin led the team to win the state championship, scoring all four goals of the final including the winner in the last minute of extra time and was named most valuable player of the tournament.

=== Sonoma State Seawolves ===
Curtin played for the Sonoma State Seawolves as a junior in 2012 and as a senior in 2013. In her junior year, she started all 21 games and led the team in statistics of goals, assists, points, shots, and shots on goal. She was also named to the First Team All-CCAA and won CCAA Newcomer of the Year. As a junior she earned NSCAA and Daktronics All-America honors. At the end of her time at Sonoma State, despite playing only two seasons, she was tenth place on the goalscoring all-time list, having scored 24 goals.

== Club career ==
=== FF Lugano 1976 ===
After playing on and off for Sacramento Storm, in July 2016, Curtin joined Swiss professional club FF Lugano 1976. In her three seasons at the club, she scored 61 goals over 90 games.

=== Valencia ===
In July 2019, Curtin joined Spanish top-tier club Valencia.

=== Zaragoza ===
In July 2020, Curtin signed with Spanish second-tier club Zaragoza.

== Personal life ==
Curtin's twin sister Lauren is also a professional footballer.
