= Lauren Curtin =

American soccer player (born 1992)

Personal information
- Date of birth: May 19, 1992 (age 34)
- Place of birth: Santa Rosa, California, United States
- Position: Defender

College career
Years	Team	Apps	(Gls)
2010–2011	Santa Rosa Bear Cubs		
2012–2013	Sonoma State Seawolves		

Senior career*
Years	Team	Apps	(Gls)
2016–2019	FF Lugano 1976		
2019–	Zaragoza		
- * Club domestic league appearances and goals

Lauren Curtin (born May 19, 1992) is an American soccer player who has played previously played for clubs such as FF Lugano 1976 in Switzerland and Zaragoza in Spain.

== Personal life ==
Curtin's twin sister Cara is also a professional footballer.
