= 2020 UEFA Women's Champions League final =

2020 UEFA Women's Champions League Final
- Match programme cover
- Event: 2019–20 UEFA Women's Champions League
VfL Wolfsburg	Lyon
(Germany)	(France)
1	3
- Date: 30 August 2020
- Venue: Anoeta, San Sebastián
- Player of the Match: Delphine Cascarino (Lyon)
- Referee: Esther Staubli (Switzerland)
- Attendance: 0 (Note: The remainder of the competition, held in August 2020, was played behind closed doors due to the COVID-19 pandemic in Europe.)
- Weather: Partly cloudy 19 °C (66 °F); 69% humidity

The 2020 UEFA Women's Champions League Final was the final match of the 2019–20 UEFA Women's Champions League, the 19th season of Europe's premier women's club football tournament organised by UEFA, and the 11th season since it was renamed from the UEFA Women's Cup to the UEFA Women's Champions League. It was played on 30 August 2020 at the Anoeta Stadium in San Sebastián, Spain, between German club VfL Wolfsburg and French club Lyon.

The match was originally scheduled to be played at the Generali Arena in Vienna, Austria, on 24 May 2020. On 23 March 2020, UEFA announced that the final was postponed indefinitely due to the COVID-19 pandemic in Europe. On 17 June 2020, UEFA announced the match would take place in San Sebastián behind closed doors, as part of a "final-eight tournament" consisting of single-match knockout ties played in two stadiums across the Basque Country.

Lyon won the final 3–1 for their fifth consecutive and record-extending seventh overall UEFA Women's Champions League title. As Lyon also won the Division 1 Féminine and the Coupe de France féminine, they completed the treble, the club's second consecutive and fifth overall.

== Teams ==
In the following table, finals until 2009 were in the UEFA Women's Cup era, since 2010 were in the UEFA Women's Champions League era.

Team	Previous finals appearances (bold indicates winners)
(Germany) VfL Wolfsburg	4 (**2013**, **2014**, 2016, 2018)
(France) Lyon	8 (2010, **2011**, **2012**, 2013, **2016**, **2017**, **2018**, **2019**)

== Venue ==
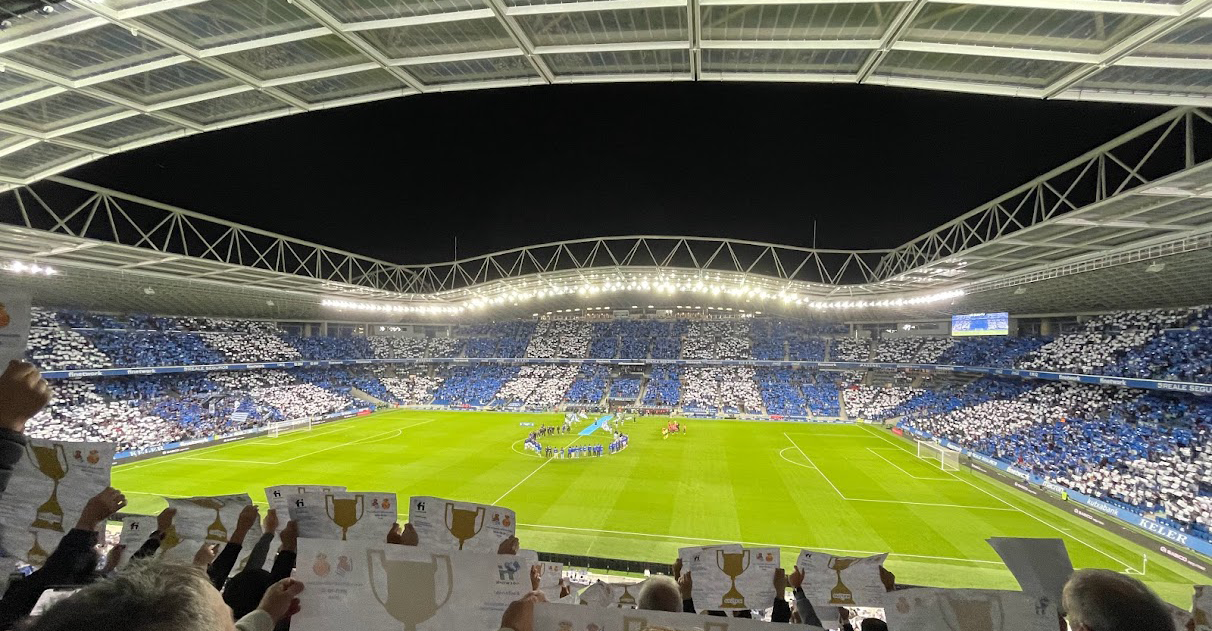
The Anoeta Stadium in San Sebastián hosted the final.

The final took place at the Anoeta Stadium in San Sebastián, Gipuzkoa, Basque Country. The stadium, city, and province hosted their first ever UEFA club competition final. The greater Basque Country however had seen the San Mamés Stadium in Bilbao hosting the second leg of the 1977 UEFA Cup Final.

=== Original host selection ===
An open bidding process was launched on 22 September 2017 by UEFA to select the venues of the finals of the UEFA Champions League, UEFA Europa League, and UEFA Women's Champions League in 2020. Associations had until 31 October 2017 to express interest, and bid dossiers must be submitted by 1 March 2018.

UEFA announced on 3 November 2017 that three associations had expressed interest in hosting the 2020 UEFA Women's Champions League final.

Bidding associations for 2020 UEFA Women's Champions League Final
Association	Stadium	City	Capacity
Austria	Generali Arena	Vienna	17,500
Belgium	Stade Maurice Dufrasne	Liège	30,023
Russia	VTB Arena	Moscow	27,000

The Generali Arena was selected by the UEFA Executive Committee during their meeting in Kyiv on 24 May 2018. This would have been the first UEFA club competition final hosted at the Generali Arena, and the first to be hosted by the city of Vienna and Austria since the 1995 UEFA Champions League Final at the Ernst-Happel-Stadion. It is the home ground of Austrian club Austria Wien. Due to UEFA regulations regarding naming rights of non-tournament sponsors, the stadium was referred to as the "Viola Park" in UEFA materials.

=== Relocation to San Sebastián ===
The 2019–20 UEFA Women's Champions League was postponed indefinitely on 17 March 2020 due to the COVID-19 pandemic in Europe. The final was officially postponed on 23 March 2020. A working group was set up by UEFA to decide the calendar of the remainder of the season, with the final decision made at the UEFA Executive Committee meeting on 17 June 2020. It was decided that the remaining matches, including the quarter-finals, semi-finals and final, would be played between 21 and 30 August at San Mamés, Bilbao and Anoeta Stadium, San Sebastián in Basque Country, Spain, as an eight-team single-match knockout tournament, with San Sebastián hosting the final.

Unlike the UEFA Champions League and Europa League, where the host venues of future finals already awarded since 2020 were all pushed back a year, the host venues of future Women's Champions League finals already awarded remained the same. The Austrian Football Association said over 12,000 tickets had already been sold for the final and they would all be refunded.

== Route to the final ==
Note: In all results below, the score of the finalist is given first (H: home; A: away; N: neutral).

(Germany) VfL Wolfsburg				Round	(France) Lyon			
Opponent	Agg.	1st leg	2nd leg	Knockout phase	Opponent	Agg.	1st leg	2nd leg
(Kosovo) Mitrovica	15–0	10–0 (A)	5–0 (H)	Round of 32	(Russia) Ryazan-VDV	16–0	9–0 (A)	7–0 (H)
(Netherlands) Twente	7–0	6–0 (H)	1–0 (A)	Round of 16	(Denmark) Fortuna Hjørring	11–0	4–0 (A)	7–0 (H)
(Scotland) Glasgow City	9–1 (N)			Quarter-finals	(Germany) Bayern Munich	2–1 (N)		
(Spain) Barcelona	1–0 (N)			Semi-finals	(France) Paris Saint-Germain	1–0 (N)		

== Pre-match ==
=== Ambassador ===
Austrian footballer Nina Burger was the original ambassador for the Vienna final.

=== Officials ===
On 28 August 2020, UEFA named Swiss official Esther Staubli as the referee for the final. Staubli had been a FIFA referee since 2006, and was previously the referee for the 2015 UEFA Women's Champions League Final. She also was a lead referee at the UEFA Women's Championship in 2013 and 2017, including the final of the latter, as well as FIFA Women's World Cup in 2015 and 2019. She was joined by assistant referees Sanja Rođak-Karšić of Croatia and Oleksandra Ardasheva of Ukraine, with the latter's compatriot Maryna Striletska serving as the reserve assistant referee. Jana Adámková of the Czech Republic was the fourth official. Spaniard José María Sánchez Martínez worked as the video assistant referee in the debut of the system in a Women's Champions League final, and was joined by his compatriot Ricardo de Burgos Bengoetxea as the assistant VAR official.

== Match ==
=== Details ===
The "home" team (for administrative purposes) was determined by an additional draw held on 8 November 2019, 13:30 CET (after the quarter-final and semi-final draws), at the UEFA headquarters in Nyon, Switzerland.

30 August 2020
20:00 UTC+2

VfL Wolfsburg (Germany)	1–3	(France) Lyon
Popp 58'	Report	Le Sommer 25'; Kumagai 44'; Gunnarsdóttir 88'

Anoeta, San Sebastián
Attendance: 0
Referee: Esther Staubli (Switzerland)

**VfL Wolfsburg**	**Lyon**

GK	27	(Germany) Friederike Abt
RB	9	(Germany) Anna Blässe		(substituted off) 78'
CB	28	(Germany) Lena Goeßling
CB	23	(Germany) Sara Doorsoun		(substituted off) 39'
LB	6	(Netherlands) Dominique Janssen
RM	10	(Germany) Svenja Huth	(yellow card) 14'	(substituted off) 61'
CM	15	(Norway) Ingrid Syrstad Engen
CM	11	(Germany) Alexandra Popp
LM	14	(Sweden) Fridolina Rolfö
CF	22	(Denmark) Pernille Harder (c)
CF	17	(Poland) Ewa Pajor		(substituted off) 61'
Substitutes:
GK	12	(Germany) Julia Kassen
GK	77	(Poland) Katarzyna Kiedrzynek
DF	4	(Germany) Kathrin Hendrich		(substituted on) 39'
DF	5	(Germany) Lena Oberdorf		(substituted on) 61'
DF	13	(Germany) Felicitas Rauch
DF	24	(Germany) Joelle Wedemeyer
MF	3	(Hungary) Zsanett Jakabfi
MF	20	(Germany) Pia-Sophie Wolter		(substituted on) 61'
MF	21	(Switzerland) Lara Dickenmann
MF	30	(Germany) Lisanne Gräwe
FW	7	(Germany) Pauline Bremer		(substituted on) 78'
Manager:
(Germany) Stephan Lerch

GK	16	(France) Sarah Bouhaddi
RB	2	(England) Lucy Bronze
CB	21	(Canada) Kadeisha Buchanan
CB	3	(France) Wendie Renard (c)
LB	26	(France) Sakina Karchaoui
CM	8	(Iceland) Sara Björk Gunnarsdóttir
CM	5	(Japan) Saki Kumagai
RW	20	(France) Delphine Cascarino		(substituted off) 87'
AM	10	(Germany) Dzsenifer Marozsán	(yellow card) 40'	(substituted off) 87'
LW	7	(France) Amel Majri		(substituted off) 90+4'
CF	9	(France) Eugénie Le Sommer		(substituted off) 90+4'
Substitutes:
GK	1	(Spain) Lola Gallardo
GK	40	(Finland) Katriina Talaslahti
DF	4	(France) Selma Bacha
DF	12	(Australia) Ellie Carpenter
DF	15	(England) Alex Greenwood		(substituted on) 90+4'
DF	23	(Belgium) Janice Cayman
MF	6	(France) Amandine Henry
FW	11	(Netherlands) Shanice van de Sanden		(substituted on) 87'
FW	24	(England) Jodie Taylor		(substituted on) 87'
FW	28	(France) Melvine Malard		(substituted on) 90+4'
Manager:
(France) Jean-Luc Vasseur

Player of the Match:
Delphine Cascarino (Lyon)

Assistant referees:
Sanja Rođak-Karšić (Croatia)
Oleksandra Ardasheva (Ukraine)
Fourth official:
Jana Adámková (Czech Republic)
Reserve assistant referee:
Maryna Striletska (Ukraine)
Video assistant referee:
José María Sánchez Martínez (Spain)
Assistant video assistant referee:
Ricardo de Burgos Bengoetxea (Spain)

**Match rules**

- 90 minutes.
- 30 minutes of extra time if necessary.
- Penalty shoot-out if scores still level.
- Twelve named substitutes.
- Maximum of five substitutions, with a sixth allowed in extra time. (Note: Each team was only given three opportunities to make substitutions, with a fourth opportunity in extra time, excluding substitutions made at half-time, before the start of extra time and at half-time in extra time.)

=== Statistics ===
Statistic	VfL Wolfsburg	Lyon
Goals scored	1	3
Total shots	10	13
Shots on target	1	7
Saves	4	0
Ball possession	48%	52%
Corner kicks	4	6
Fouls committed	11	8
Offsides	1	1
Yellow cards	1	1
Red cards	0	0

== See also ==
- 2019–20 Olympique Lyonnais Féminin season
- 2020 UEFA Champions League Final
- 2020 UEFA Europa League Final
- 2020 UEFA Super Cup
- Played between same clubs:
- 2013 UEFA Women's Champions League final
- 2016 UEFA Women's Champions League final
- 2018 UEFA Women's Champions League final
