= Katrine Abel =

Danish football goalkeeper (born 1990)

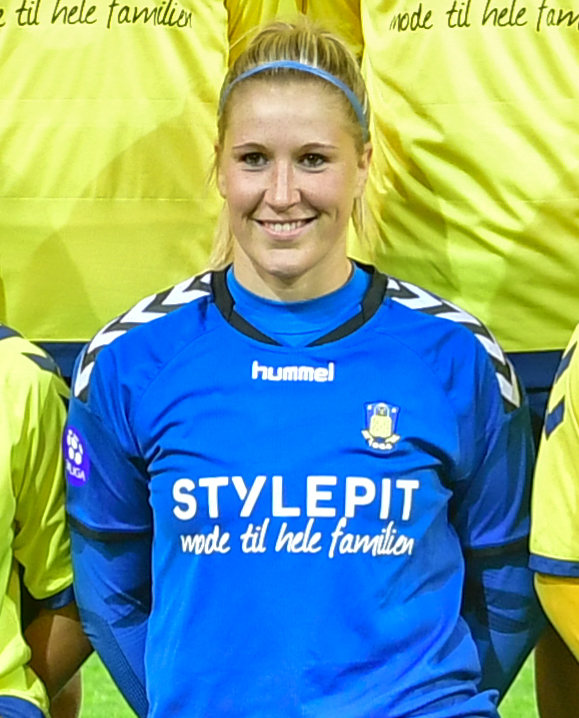
- Katrine Abel in October 2016

Personal information
- Full name: Katrine Louise Abel
- Date of birth: 28 June 1990 (age 36)
- Place of birth: Denmark
- Height: 1.70 m (5 ft 7 in)
- Position: Goalkeeper

Team information
- Current team: Brøndby
- Number: 1

Senior career*
Years	Team	Apps	(Gls)
2006–2011	Varde IF		
2011–2013	Taastrup FC		
2014–	Brøndby	57	(0)

International career^{‡}
2015–2020	Denmark	17	(0)
- * Club domestic league appearances and goals as of 19:30, 12 July 2020 (UTC) ‡ National team caps and goals as of 28 October 2020

Katrine Louise Abel (born 28 June 1990) is a Danish football goalkeeper who plays for Brøndby IF of Denmark's Elitedivisionen. In 2015, she won her first cap for the senior Denmark national team.

== Club career ==
Abel played 78 times in all competitions for Varde IF. She moved on to Taastrup FC, but became a free agent when the club withdrew from the Elitedivisionen in December 2013. In January 2014 Abel trained with reigning champions Brøndby IF and agreed a one-year contract with the club.

== International career ==
As an uncapped player, Abel was called up to be part of the national team for UEFA Women's Euro 2013. She made her international debut for Denmark in January 2015, playing the second half of a 3–2 friendly defeat by New Zealand in Belek, Turkey.

== Merits ==
=== Club ===
Brøndby IF

The Elite Division

- Gold: 2018–19
- Gold: 2016–17
- Gold: 2014–15
- Silver: 2017–18
- Silver: 2015–16

Sydbank Kvindepokalen

- Gold: 2018
- Gold: 2017
- Gold: 2015
- Silver: 2019
- Silver: 2016
