= Maarja Saulep =

Estonian footballer

Personal information
- Date of birth: 9 May 1991 (age 35)
- Place of birth: Kohtla-Järve, Estonia
- Position: Forward

Team information
- Current team: FC Flora
- Number: 11

Senior career*
Years	Team	Apps	(Gls)
2012–2017	Tammeka	0	(0)
2018–	FC Flora		

International career^{‡}
2019–	Estonia	30	(1)
- * Club domestic league appearances and goals ‡ National team caps and goals as of 1 August 2022

Maarja Saulep (born 9 May 1991) is an Estonian footballer who plays as a forward for Flora and the Estonia women's national team.

== Career ==
Prior to joining Flora, she played for Tammeka. She made her debut for the Estonia national team on 7 November 2019 against Belarus, coming on as a substitute for Signy Aarna.
