= Anja Prša =

Slovenian footballer

Personal information
- Full name: Anja Prša
- Date of birth: 9 June 1994 (age 32)
- Place of birth: Slovenia
- Position: Defender

Team information
- Current team: Olimpija Ljubljana
- Number: 14

Senior career*
Years	Team	Apps	(Gls)
2009–2020	Pomurje	194	(50)
2020–	Olimpija Ljubljana	1	(0)

International career^{‡}
2010	Slovenia U17	2	(0)
2011–2012	Slovenia U19	6	(1)
2011–	Slovenia	8	(0)
- * Club domestic league appearances and goals as of 17 August 2020 ‡ National team caps and goals as of 17 August 2020

Anja Prša (born 9 June 1994) is a Slovenian football defender currently playing in the 1. SŽNL for Olimpija Ljubljana. She made her debut for the senior Slovenian national team in November 2011 against the Netherlands.
