= FC Lugano Femminile =

FF Lugano 1976
- Full name: Football Femminile Lugano 1976
- Founded: 1976
- Ground: Stadio di Cornaredo
- Capacity: 6,330
- Chairman: Emanuele Gaiarin
- Manager: Massimo Migliorini
- League: Nationalliga A
- 2018–19: 2nd
- Website: https://www.fflugano.com
Home colours	Away colours

Football Femminile Lugano 1976 known as FF Lugano 1976 or simply Lugano are a Swiss women's football team from Lugano, Ticino who play domestically in the Frauen Nationalliga A.

Since 2015 and through their chairman Emanuele Gaiarin, encourage young American footballers who have played NCAA soccer to play for them by providing free accommodation and classes in Italian. Through this approach, they finished second in the 2018–19 season and made their European debut in the 2019–20 Women's Champions League. The majority of the current squad are American.

== History ==
The club was founded in 1976 by Andrea Incerti, originally as AS Armonia Lugano but later, in 1983, the club was incorporated into Rapid Lugano and renamed to FCF Rapid Lugano. They won their first league title in the 1988–89 season.

From 1978 to 2009, the club organised an internationally renowned Easter tournament containing both domestic and international teams. Lugano won this tournament nine times, including three tournament wins in a row between 2005 and 2007. At the end of the 2006–07 season, FC Rapid Lugano finished in the last place and was relegated to the Nationalliga B. In the 2015–16 season, after its return to the Nationalliga A, the club changed its name and became Football Femminile Lugano 1976.

== Players ==
=== Current squad ===
As of 25 September 2020

Note: Flags indicate national team as defined under FIFA eligibility rules; some limited exceptions apply. Players may hold more than one non-FIFA nationality.

No.	Pos.	Nation	Player
12	GK	ITA	Miriam Ubaldi
28	GK	USA	Morgan Bertsch
6	DF	SUI	Sara Tonelli
14	DF	SUI	Nathalie Polledri
20	DF	SUI	Mia Von Ballmoos
24	DF	USA	Kelly Chicerking
7	MF	USA	Lauren Curtin
8	MF	SUI	Stella Suter
16	MF	SUI	Mathilda Andreoli

No.	Pos.	Nation	Player
17	MF	KOS	Anila Bytyqi
22	MF	SUI	Sofia Pedrazzini
23	MF	USA	Kat McDonald
9	FW	USA	Tori Baliatico
10	FW	COL	Lina Granados
17	FW	USA	Christina Bellero
18	FW	USA	Samantha DePinho
21	FW	USA	Kaela Dickerman
25	FW	USA	Ashley Herndon

=== Former players ===
For details of current and former players, see Category:FF Lugano 1976 players.

- (Bulgaria) Simona Petkova

== Record in UEFA Women's Champions League ==
Lugano made their Champions League debut in the 2019–20 season, losing in the round of 32 to Manchester City.

Season	Round	Opponent	Home	Away	Agg
2019–20	Round of 32	(England) Manchester City	1–7	0–4	1–11
