= Valentina Kröll =

Austrian footballer (born 2003)

Personal information
- Date of birth: 6 December 2002 (age 23)
- Place of birth: Schwaz, Austria
- Height: 1.74 m (5 ft 9 in)
- Position: Defender

Team information
- Current team: Carl Zeiss Jena

Senior career*
Years	Team	Apps	(Gls)
2019–2023	Sturm Graz	40	(5)
2023–2024	SGS Essen	6	(0)
2023–2024	SGS Essen II	16	(1)
2025–2026	FC Basel	7	(0)
2026–	Carl Zeiss Jena	0	(0)

International career
2017–2019	Austria U17	9	(0)
2019	Austria U19	3	(0)
- * Club domestic league appearances and goals as of 12 July 2026

Valentina Kröll (born 6 December 2002) is an Austrian footballer who plays as a defender for 2. Frauen-Bundesliga club Carl Zeiss Jena.
