= Shade Pratt =

American soccer player (born 1993)

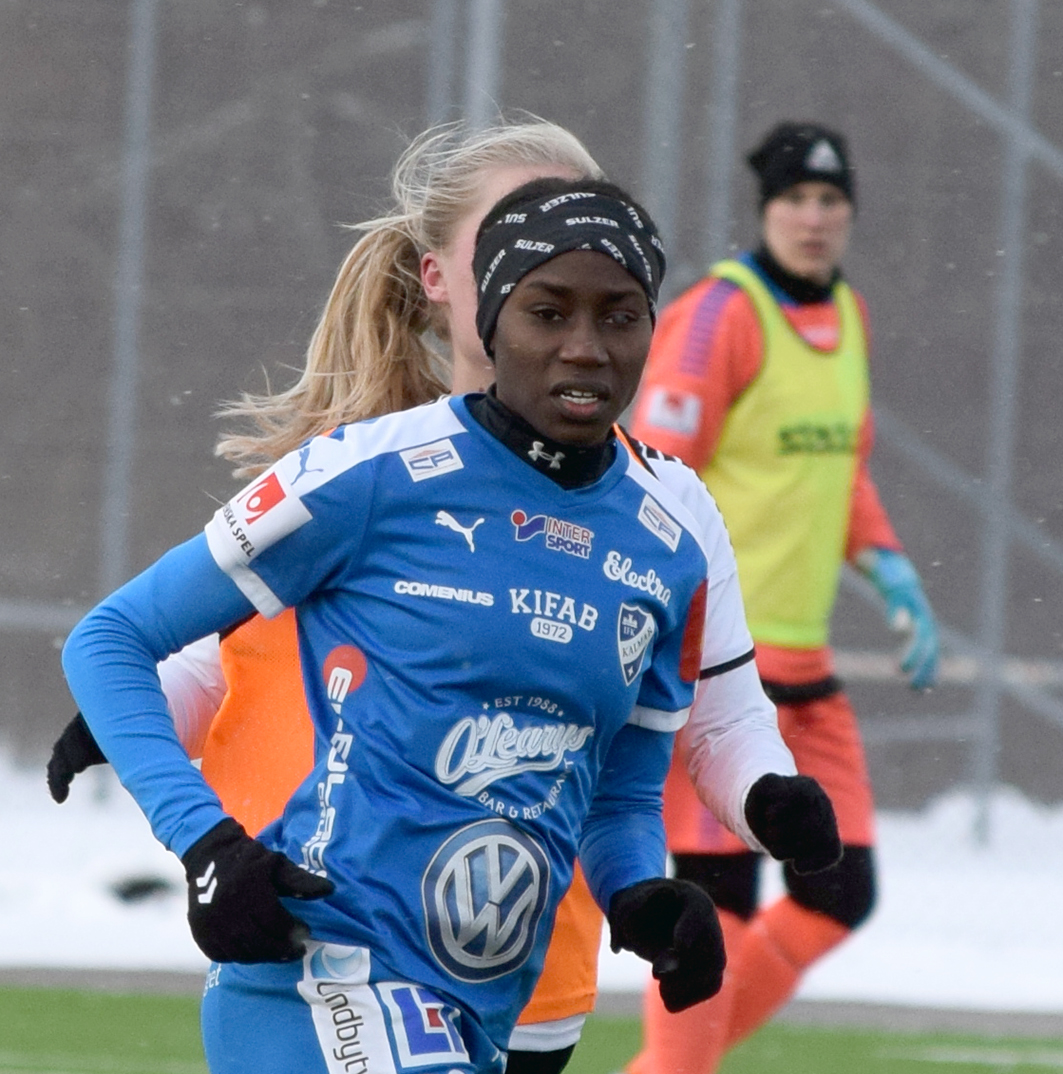

Personal information
- Full name: Folashade Annie Evelyn Pratt
- Date of birth: April 2, 1993 (age 33)
- Place of birth: Germantown, Maryland, United States
- Height: 5 ft 7 in (1.70 m)
- Positions: Defender; forward

Youth career
- Rosemount High School

College career
Years	Team	Apps	(Gls)
2011–2014	Maryland Terrapins	46	(1)

Senior career*
Years	Team	Apps	(Gls)
2015	Sky Blue FC	1	(0)
2016	Portland Thorns FC	5	(0)
2017	Røa	7	(0)
2018	IFK Kalmar	12	(3)
2019	B.93	5	(1)
2019–2020	Braga	23	(5)
- * Club domestic league appearances and goals

Folashade Annie Evelyn Pratt (born April 2, 1993) is an American footwear designer and retired soccer player who last played for Braga of the Campeonato Nacional de Futebol Feminino.

== Early life and collegiate career ==
Pratt was born in Maryland and raised in Minnesota, where attended Rosemount High School in her hometown. In her time there she earned several accolades, including being nominated a two-time All-Metro selection, two-time all-state selection, and three-time all-conference selection. In 2011, Pratt went to University of Maryland, where she played soccer and competed in track-and-field events. She played only seven matches in her freshman year. In her sophomore year, she became a starter for the Terrapins, playing most as a wide midfield and a wide back. In her junior year, Pratt played for the first time in her career as a centre-back. In her senior year, after several Terrapins were sidelined by injuries, Pratt was moved to frontline, becoming a forward.

== Club career ==
Pratt was the 25th overall pick in the 2015 NWSL College Draft when she was picked by Sky Blue FC. Pratt only played one match for Sky Blue, on June 28, 2015, against the Chicago Red Stars. For the 2016 National Women's Soccer League season, Pratt signed with Portland Thorns FC. She played five matches for the Thorns in that season in which the Thorns won the NWSL Shield.

In 2017 she was signed to the Norwegian top club Røa Dynamite Girls. From August she was on loan to another club in the same division, Stabaek Chixa. She signed with the Swedish club IFK Kalmar in January 2018.

In June 2019, she signed with the Portuguese champions, Braga.

== Post-professional playing career ==
Pratt's professional footballing career was disrupted by the impact of the COVID-19 pandemic on sports. In an interview in November 2020, Pratt said documenting the George Floyd protests in Minneapolis as a photographer inspired her to take up painting large-scale murals over the boarded-up windows of businesses, which led to her being commissioned for further murals. Her works included a mural of former Minnesota Lynx center Sylvia Fowles.

By the end of 2020, Pratt began pursuing a career in footwear design that she had first considered after graduating from college. After internships for Adidas and New Balance, she accepted a position in Portland as a designer with Nike Inc., which she held as of 2024. Her designs for Nike included the Serena Williams Air More Uptempo in 2023, Williams' first signature shoe released after her retirement from professional tennis.

Pratt also continued playing soccer in The Soccer Tournament, making the rosters of Tampa Bay Sun FC in 2024, and of Club América in 2026.
