= Franz Horr Stadium =

Building in Vienna, Austria

- Franz-Horr-Stadion
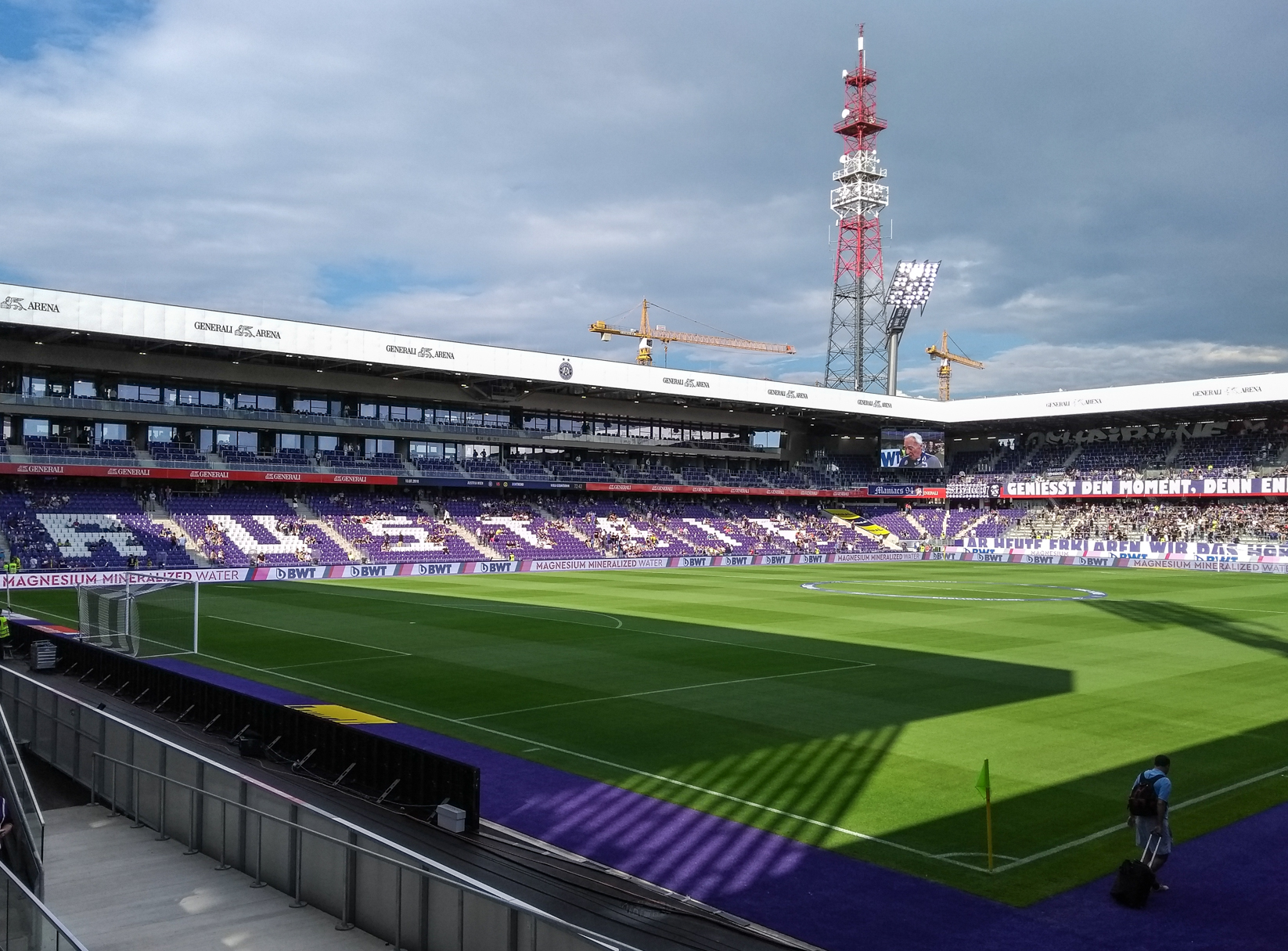
- The Generali Arena in July 2018
- Interactive map of Franz Horr Stadium
- Full name: Generali Arena; Viola Park (UEFA matches)
- Former names: České-srdce-Platz; Franz-Horr-Stadion (1974–2011); Austria Arena (UEFA matches, until 2018)
- Location: Vienna, Austria
- Coordinates: 48°9′44″N 16°23′12″E
- Capacity: 15,600 (domestic matches); 14,500 (international and European matches)
- Surface: Natural grass

Construction
- Opened: 30 August 1925

Tenants
- Austria Vienna (1973–2016, 2018–present); Vienna Vikings (2022–present); Slovan Vienna (1925–c. 1945); FK Austria Wien

The Franz Horr Stadium, formally known as Generali Arena for sponsorship reasons and Viola Park for international matches, is an association football stadium in the south of Vienna, Austria.

It has been the home ground of FK Austria Wien since 1973.

== History ==
The stadium was built in 1925 as the new home of Czech immigrants' club SK Slovan and had a capacity of 10,850. Named after another Czech football club which owned the ground, the stadium was called České srdce ("Czech heart") ground. Largely destroyed during World War II, each of the four stands has been reconstructed several times since.

After the war the AC Slovan Wien, who were even promoted to the A-League in 1950, moved to the Red Star Square in the west of the city. The cinder track around the playing field temporarily found a new purpose in hosting motorcycle speedway races. The stadium hosted a qualifying round of the Speedway World Championship in 1960. Under the new provisional name ASKÖ-X-Platz, mainly small lower league teams played in the renovated stadium again.

From 1961 under the patronage of the Vienna Football Association, which took over the stadium and renamed it WFV Stadium. The stadium was later renamed Franz-Horr-Stadion in honour of the Wiener Fußball-Verband's (Vienna Football Association) president Franz Horr (1913–1974), who died in 1974.

In 2008 and between 2016 and 2018 the East, West and North stands were completely reconstructed as two-tier stands. The North stand also includes a new Top-VIP area. After these modifications, the stadium's maximum capacity is now 17,600.

In January 2011, the stadium was renamed Generali Arena, as part of a sponsorship deal between FK Austria Wien and the Italian insurance group Generali. Since UEFA does not recognize sponsored stadium names, the venue is referred to as Viola Park in European competitions, after previously called the Austria Arena. It was originally planned to host the 2020 UEFA Women's Champions League Final, but that match was moved to Anoeta Stadium in San Sebastián due to adjustments caused by COVID-19 pandemic in Europe.
