= Kosovo women's national football team results (2020–present) =

This is a list of Kosovo women's national football team results from 2020 to present.

== Fixtures and results ==
=== 2020 ===
6 March UEFA Euro 2021 qualifying	Kosovo	0–5	Russia	Wiesbaden, Germany
18:00		Report	F. Shala 1' (o.g.); Korovkina 33'; Smirnova 47', 53'; Fedorova 50'	Stadium: Brita-Arena; Attendance: 450; Referee: Henrikke Nervik (Norway)

10 March UEFA Euro 2021 qualifying	Kosovo	0–3	Slovenia	Pristina, Kosovo
18:00		Report	Begič 14'; Predanič 37'; Milović 90+3'	Stadium: Fadil Vokrri Stadium; Attendance: 1500; Referee: Lois Otte (Belgium)

18 September UEFA Euro 2022 qualifying	Kosovo	2–0	Estonia	Pristina, Kosovo
19:00	Himanen 8' (o.g.); Biqkaj 28'	Report		Stadium: Fadil Vokrri Stadium; Attendance: 0 Referee: Olivia Tschon (Austria)

23 October UEFA Euro 2022 qualifying	Turkey	0–0	Kosovo	Manavgat, Turkey
		Report		Stadium: Arslan Zeki Demirci Sports Complex; Attendance: 0 Referee: Stacey Pearson (England)

27 October UEFA Euro 2022 qualifying	Kosovo	0–6	Netherlands	Pristina, Kosovo
		Report		Stadium: Fadil Vokrri Stadium; Attendance: 0 Referee: Sandra Braz Bastos (Portugal)

27 November UEFA Euro 2022 qualifying	Russia	3–0	Kosovo	Manavgat, Turkey
17:00 (19:00 TRT)	Fedorova 6', 12'; Abdullina 9'	Report		Stadium: Arslan Zeki Demirci Sports Complex; Attendance: 0 Referee: Ewa Augustyn (Poland)

1 December UEFA Euro 2022 qualifying	Netherlands	6–0	Kosovo	Breda, Netherlands
18:30	Snoeijs 49', 75', 84'; Roord 51', 83'; Martens 58'	Report		Stadium: Rat Verlegh Stadion; Attendance: 0 Referee: Barbara Poxhofer (Austria)

=== 2021 ===
8 April Friendly	North Macedonia	1–3	Kosovo	Skopje, North Macedonia
15:00	Maksuti 60'	Report	Halilaj 39'; Musaj 55'; Kastrati 85'	Stadium: Petar Miloševski Training Centre; Attendance: 0 Referee: Ivana Pajkovska (North Macedonia)

11 April Friendly	North Macedonia	0–1	Kosovo	Skopje, North Macedonia
13:00		Report	Syla 85'	Stadium: Petar Miloševski Training Centre; Attendance: 0 Referee: Irena Velevackovska (North Macedonia)

16 September 2023 FIFA World Cup qualification	Albania	1–1	Kosovo	Elbasan, Albania
19:00	Doçi 43' (pen.)	Report	Limani 71'	Stadium: Elbasan Arena; Referee: Elvira Nurmustafina (Kazakhstan)

21 September 2023 FIFA World Cup qualification	Kosovo	0–3	Norway	Pristina, Kosovo
19:00		Report	Avduli 12' (o.g.); Blakstad 36'; Karlseng Utland 56'	Stadium: Fadil Vokrri Stadium; Referee: Reelika Turi (Estonia)

21 October 2023 FIFA World Cup qualification	Belgium	7–0	Kosovo	Leuven Belgium
20:00	Vanhaevermaet 3', 36'; Cayman 9'; Wullaert 16', 51', 69'; De Caigny 28'	Report		Stadium: Den Dreef; Referee: Jelena Kumer (Croatia)

26 October 2023 FIFA World Cup qualification	Armenia	0–1	Kosovo	Yerevan, Armenia
16:00 (19:00 AMT)		Report	Syla 87'	Stadium: Vazgen Sargsyan Republican Stadium; Referee: Viola Raudziņa (Latvia)

25 November 2023 FIFA World Cup qualification	Kosovo	1–2	Poland	Pristina, Kosovo
16:00	Syla 4'	Report	Gec 17'; Wiankowska 34'	Stadium: Fadil Vokrri Stadium; Referee: Galiya Echeva (Bulgaria)

30 November 2023 FIFA World Cup qualification	Kosovo	1–3	Albania	Pristina, Kosovo
16:00	Biqkaj 45+3'	Report	Maksuti 19'; Doci 45'; Krasniqi 83'	Stadium: Fadil Vokrri Stadium; Referee: Lovisa Johansson (Sweden)

=== 2022 ===
7 April 2023 FIFA World Cup qualification	Norway	5–1	Kosovo	Sandefjord, Norway
18:00	Hegerberg 21', 23', 60'; Maanum 31'; Ildhusøy 84'	Report	Memeti 55'	Stadium: Sandefjord Arena; Referee: Tanja Subotič (Slovenia)

12 April 2023 FIFA World Cup qualification	Kosovo	1–6	Belgium	Pristina, Kosovo
	Memeti 68'	Report	De Caigny 22'; Wullaert 41', 44', 54', 65' (pen.); Minnaert 77'	Stadium: Fadil Vokrri Stadium; Referee: Eleni Antoniou (Greece)

24 June Friendly	North Macedonia	3–1	Kosovo	Skopje, North Macedonia
17:30	Andreevska 19', 62'; Mustafa 26'	Report	Shala (?)	Stadium: Petar Miloševski Training Centre

27 June Friendly	Kosovo	4–0	North Macedonia	Pristina, Kosovo
19:00	Metaj 2'; Memeti 59', 74'; Shala 87'	Report		Stadium: Fadil Vokrri Stadium; Referee: Genc Nuza (Kosovo)

1 September 2023 FIFA World Cup qualification	Kosovo	2–1	Armenia	Pristina, Kosovo
	Metaj 78'; Halilaj 87'	Report	Smaili 77' (o.g.)	Stadium: Fadil Vokrri Stadium; Referee: Jelena Jermolajeva (Latvia)

6 September 2023 FIFA World Cup qualification	Poland	7–0	Kosovo	Lublin, Poland
18:30	Dudek 3'; Lefeld 12'; Pajor 13', 37', 53' (pen.); Mesjasz 35'; Kozak 72'	Report		Stadium: Arena Lublin; Referee: Triinu Laos (Estonia)

12 November Friendly	Slovenia	3–1	Kosovo	Koper, Slovenia
15:00 UTC+1	Zver 37', 74'; Kramžar 90'	Report	Memeti 11'	Stadium: Bonifika Stadium; Attendance: 250; Referee: Tjaša Misja (Slovenia)

=== 2023 ===
15 February 2023 Turkish Women's Cup	Estonia	1–2	Kosovo	Alanya, Turkey
18:30	Kubassova 16'	Report (FFK); Mängud	Ejupi 37'; Memeti 69'	Stadium: Goldcity Sport Complex; Referee: Cansu Tiryaki (Turkiye)

18 February 2023 Turkish Women's Cup	Kosovo	7–0	Hong Kong	Alanya, Turkey
11:00	Guri 30'; Biqkaj 65', 79'; Metaj 84'; J. Shala 89', 90+1'; Halilaj 90+3'	Report		Stadium: Gold City Sport Complex; Referee: Cansu Tiryaki (Turkiye)

21 February 2023 Turkish Women's Cup	Bulgaria	1–2	Kosovo	Alanya, Turkey
11:00			Memeti 10'; Metaj 40'	Stadium: Gold City Sport Complex; Referee: Gamze Durmuş Pakkan (Turkiye)

6 April 2023 BFU International Women's Cup	Kosovo	1–0	Latvia	Sofia, Bulgaria
11:00 UTC+2	Halilaj 27'	Report		Stadium: Boyana Sports Complex

10 April 2023 BFU International Women's Cup	Bulgaria	0–1	Kosovo	Sofia, Bulgaria
16:30 UTC+2		Report	Memeti 16'	Stadium: Boyana Sports Complex

13 July Friendly	Kosovo	4–0	Liechtenstein	Hajvalia, Kosovo
16:30	Memeti 41'; Kastrati 58' (pen.); Biqkaj 65' (pen.); J. Shala 87' (pen.)	Report		Stadium: FFK National Educational Camp; Attendance: 150; Referee: Emanuela Rusta (Albania)

16 July Friendly	Kosovo	2–0	Liechtenstein	Hajvalia, Kosovo
11:30	Halilaj 78'; Ramadani 81'	Report		Stadium: FFK National Educational Camp; Attendance: 40; Referee: Emanuela Rusta (Albania)

26 September 2023–24 UEFA Nations League	Bulgaria	0–0	Kosovo	Plovdiv, Bulgaria
17:00		Report		Stadium: Stadion Lokomotiv; Referee: Lovisa Johansson (Sweden)

27 October 2023–24 UEFA Nations League	North Macedonia	0–2	Kosovo	Skopje, North Macedonia
13:00		Report	Limani 20'; Metaj 41'	Stadium: Petar Miloševski Training Centre; Referee: Michaela Pachtova (Czech Republic)

31 October 2023–24 UEFA Nations League	Kosovo	3–1	North Macedonia	Pristina, Kosovo
17:00	Halilaj 7' (pen.); Memeti 14'; Biqkaj 34'	Report	Cokleska 90'	Stadium: Fadil Vokrri Stadium; Referee: Silvia Domingos (Portugal)

1 December 2023–24 UEFA Nations League	Kosovo	5–1	Bulgaria	Podujevo, Kosovo
13:00	Halilaj 39'; Metaj 58'; Uka 71'; Memeti 84', 89'	Report	Ivanova 26'	Stadium: Zahir Pajaziti Stadium; Attendance: 120; Referee: Meliz Özçiğdem (Turkey)

=== 2024 ===
21 February 2024 Turkish Women's Cup	Hong Kong	0–1	Kosovo	Alanya, Turkey
16:30		Report	Ejupi 78'	Stadium: Gold City Sport Complex; Referee: Gamze Durmuş (Turkey)

24 February 2024 Turkish Women's Cup	Kosovo	3–0	Estonia	Alanya, Turkey
11:00	Uka 15'; Ejupi 29'; Metaj 33'	Report		Stadium: Gold City Sport Complex; Referee: Cansu Tiryaki (Turkey)

27 February 2024 Turkish Women's Cup	Kosovo	1–0	India	Alanya, Turkey
11:00	Memeti 90+1'	Report		Stadium: Gold City Sport Complex; Referee: Gamze Durmuş (Turkey)

5 April UEFA Euro 2025 qualifying	Ukraine	2–0	Kosovo	Antalya, Turkey
17:00	Petryk 28' (pen.); Khimich 34'	Report		Stadium: Mardan Sports Complex; Attendance: 45; Referee: Karoline Wacker (Germany)

9 April UEFA Euro 2025 qualifying	Kosovo	0–6	Wales	Podujevo, Kosovo
14:00		Report	Rowe 30', 60'; Barton 44'; Morgan 62'; Hughes 85', 90+3'	Stadium: Zahir Pajaziti Stadium; Attendance: 200; Referee: Galiya Echeva (Bulgaria)

31 May UEFA Euro 2025 qualifying	Kosovo	0–1	Croatia	Podujevo, Kosovo
17:00		Report	Rudelić 58'	Stadium: Zahir Pajaziti Stadium; Attendance: 500; Referee: Kristina Georgieva (Bulgaria)

4 June UEFA Euro 2025 qualifying	Croatia	2–0	Kosovo	Karlovac, Croatia
20:00	Rudelić 15'; Marković 74'	Report		Stadium: Stadion Branko Čavlović-Čavlek; Attendance: 348; Referee: Michaela Pachtová (Czech Republic)

12 July UEFA Euro 2025 qualifying	Kosovo	0–4	Ukraine	Pristina, Kosovo
18:00		Report	Apanashchenko 3'; Khimich 8'; Basanska 21'; Kravchuk 27'	Stadium: Fadil Vokrri Stadium; Attendance: 347; Referee: Zuzana Valentová (Slovakia)

16 July UEFA Euro 2025 qualifying	Wales	2–0	Kosovo	Llanelli, Wales
19:00		Report		Stadium: Parc y Scarlets; Referee: Deborah Anex (Switzerland)

29 November Friendly	Kosovo	8–0	Estonia	Pristina, Kosovo
14:00 UTC+2	Biqkaj 6'; Memeti 15', 32', 50'; Fetaj 41'; Uka 68', 71', 82' (pen.)	Report		Stadium: Fadil Vokrri Stadium; Referee: Florian Lata (Albania)

2 December Friendly	Kosovo	1–2	Estonia	Pristina, Kosovo
14:00 UTC+2	Halilaj 90+1' (pen.)	Report	Kubassova 23'; Teern 35'	Stadium: Fadil Vokrri Stadium; Referee: Florian Lata (Albania)

=== 2025 ===
21 February 2025 UEFA Nations League	North Macedonia	0–4	Kosovo	Skopje, North Macedonia
		Report	Biqkaj 6' 49'; Fetaj 65'; Metaj 67'	Stadium: Petar Miloševski Training Centre; Attendance: 197; Referee: Emilie Torkelsen (Norway)

25 February 2025 UEFA Nations League	Kosovo	0–1	Latvia	Pristina, Kosovo
		Report	Zaičikova 51'	Stadium: Fadil Vokrri Stadium; Referee: Maïka Vanderstichel (France)

8 April 2025 UEFA Nations League	Kosovo	3–0	North Macedonia	Pristina, Kosovo
15:00	Biqkaj 50' 66'; Memeti 85'	Report		Stadium: Fadil Vokrri Stadium; Referee: Jurgita Mačikunytė (Lithuania)

3 June 2025 UEFA Nations League	Latvia	2–2	Kosovo	Riga, Latvia
19:00	Misini 17' (o.g.); Miksone 45+2' (pen.)	Report	Smaili 20'; Memeti 31'	Stadium: LNK Sporta Parks; Attendance: 401; Referee: Elisabet Calvo Valentín (Spain)

28 June Friendly	Estonia	0–1	Kosovo	Tallinn, Estonia
17:00		Report	Imeraj 72'	Stadium: Kadriorg Stadium; Attendance: 194; Referee: Jelena Jermolajeva (Latvia)

1 July Friendly	Estonia	2–2	Kosovo	Tallinn, Estonia
19:00	Lillemäe 13'; Salei 46'	Report	Biqkaj 30'; Memeti 41'	Stadium: Kadriorg Stadium; Attendance: 327; Referee: Satu Miettunen (Finland)

24 October 2025 UEFA Nations League play-off	Kosovo	0–4	Turkey	Pristina, Kosovo
18:00		Report	Hançar 5' 10'; Pekel 23'; Şeker 81'	Stadium: Fadil Vokrri Stadium; Attendance: 300; Referee: Michaela Pachtová (Czech Republic)

28 October 2025 UEFA Nations League play-off	Turkey	3–0	Kosovo	İzmir, Turkey
20:00	Pekel 22'; Hançar 29' (pen.); Şeker 78'	Report		Stadium: Gürsel Aksel Stadium; Attendance: 5,901; Referee: Michalina Diakow (Poland)

=== 2026 ===
3 March 2027 FIFA World Cup qualification	Kosovo	6–0	Gibraltar	Pristina, Kosovo
17:00	Biqkaj 4'; Sahiti 26'; Uka 63'; Memeti 72'; Fetaj 76', 87'	Report		Stadium: Fadil Vokrri Stadium; Attendance: 100; Referee: Oxana Cruc (Moldova)

7 March 2027 FIFA World Cup qualification	Croatia	0–1	Kosovo	Karlovac, Croatia
17:00		Report	Uka 13'	Stadium: Stadion Branko Čavlović-Čavlek; Attendance: 200; Referee: Lovisa Johansson (Sweden)

14 April 2027 FIFA World Cup qualification	Bulgaria	1–3	Kosovo	Sofia, Bulgaria
16:00 (17:00 UTC+3)	Yaneva 9'	Report	Memeti 15'; Smaili 21'; Fejza 89'	Stadium: Stadion Aleksandar Shalamanov; Attendance: 250; Referee: Zoe Stavrou (Cyprus)

18 April 2027 FIFA World Cup qualification	Kosovo	2–1	Bulgaria	Pristina, Kosovo
18:00	Smaili 52'; Memeti 90+6'	Report	Petrova 42'	Stadium: Fadil Vokrri Stadium; Referee: Jana Van Laere (Belgium)

5 June 2027 FIFA World Cup qualification	Kosovo	0–1	Croatia	Pristina, Kosovo
19:00		Report	Čanjevac 15'	Stadium: Fadil Vokrri Stadium; Attendance: 800; Referee: Karoline Wacker (Germany)

9 June 2027 FIFA World Cup qualification	Gibraltar	0–8	Kosovo	Europa Point, Gibraltar
19:00		Report	Halilaj 3'; Memeti 7', 21'; Biqkaj 14'; Smaili 32', 76'; Uka 68'; Fetaj 84'	Stadium: Europa Sports Park; Referee: Marisca Overtoom (Netherlands)

== Kosovo against other countries ==
As of 12 April 2026

Key

Positive balance (more wins than losses)
Neutral balance (as many wins as losses)
Negative balance (more losses than wins)

Opponent	Pld	W	D	L	GF	GA	GD	Win %
Albania	2	0	1	1	2	4	−2	0.00
Armenia	2	2	0	0	3	1	+2	100.00
Belgium	2	0	0	2	1	13	−12	0.00
Bulgaria	4	3	1	0	8	2	+6	75.00
Croatia	3	1	0	2	1	3	−2	33.33
Estonia	7	5	1	1	19	5	+14	71.43
Gibraltar	1	1	0	0	6	0	+6	100.00
Hong Kong	2	2	0	0	8	0	+8	100.00
India	1	1	0	0	1	0	+1	100.00
Latvia	3	1	1	1	3	3	+0	33.33
Netherlands	2	0	0	2	0	12	−12	0.00
North Macedonia	8	7	0	1	21	5	+16	87.50
Norway	2	0	0	2	1	8	−7	0.00
Poland	2	0	0	2	1	9	−8	0.00
Russia	2	0	0	2	0	8	−8	0.00
Slovenia	2	0	0	2	1	6	−5	0.00
Turkey	3	0	1	2	0	7	−7	0.00
Ukraine	2	0	0	2	0	6	−6	0.00
Wales	2	0	0	2	0	8	−8	0.00
19 Countries	52	23	5	24	76	100	−24	44.23

== Notes and references ==
=== Notes ===
1. Due to the COVID-19 pandemic in Europe, all matches scheduled from September 2020 were played behind closed doors.
2. The Kosovo v Russia match, originally scheduled for 4 October 2019, 18:00, at the Fadil Vokrri Stadium, Pristina, was postponed on 28 September due to security issues. The match was later rescheduled to 6 March 2020. On 18 October, UEFA announced that both matches between Kosovo and Russia will be played at neutral venues.
3. All matches originally scheduled to be played in April and June 2020 were postponed due to the COVID-19 pandemic in Europe. These matches were subsequently rescheduled to be played between September and December 2020.
