= 2024 Turkish Women's Cup =

Tournament details
- Host country: Turkey
- Dates: 21–27 February
- Teams: 4 (from 2 confederations)
- Venue: 1 (in 1 host city)

Final positions
- Champions: Kosovo (2nd title)
- Runners-up: India
- Third place: Estonia
- Fourth place: Hong Kong

Tournament statistics
- Matches played: 6
- Goals scored: 15 (2.5 per match)
- Top scorer(s): (India) Manisha Kalyan (Kosovo) Elizabeta Ejupi (2 goals)
- Best player: (Kosovo) Erëleta Memeti

The 2024 Turkish Women's Cup was the eighth edition of the Turkish Women's Cup, the annual women's football tournament held in Alanya, Turkey for the women's national association football teams. The tournament took place from 21 to 27 February 2024.

== Teams ==
Four football associations from two confederations (namely UEFA and AFC) confirmed their participation in the tournament.

| Team | App | FIFA ranking December 2023 |
|---|---|---|
| India | 3rd | 65 |
| Hong Kong | 3rd | 79 |
| Estonia | 2nd | 98 |
| Kosovo | 4th | 100 |

== Standings ==
| Pos | Team | Pld | W | D | L | GF | GA | GD | Pts | Result |
|---|---|---|---|---|---|---|---|---|---|---|
| 1 | Kosovo (C) | 3 | 3 | 0 | 0 | 5 | 0 | +5 | 9 | Champions |
| 2 | India | 3 | 2 | 0 | 1 | 6 | 4 | +2 | 6 | Runners-up |
| 3 | Estonia | 3 | 1 | 0 | 2 | 4 | 7 | −3 | 3 | |
| 4 | Hong Kong | 3 | 0 | 0 | 3 | 0 | 4 | −4 | 0 | |

Source: GSM
(C) Champions

== Matches ==
21 February 2024
11:00

| India | 4–3 | Estonia |
|---|---|---|
| Manisha 17', 81'; Indumathi 62'; Xaxa 79' | Report | Tammik 32'; Kubassova 88'; Lillemäe 90' |

Gold City Sport Complex, Alanya
Referee: Melis Özçiğdem (Turkey)
21 February 2024
16:30

| Hong Kong | 0–1 | Kosovo |
|---|---|---|
| | Report | Ejupi 78' |

Gold City Sport Complex, Alanya
Referee: Gamze Durmuş (Turkey)

24 February 2024
11:00

| Kosovo | 3–0 | Estonia |
|---|---|---|
| Uka 14'; Ejupi 29'; Metaj 32' | Report |

Gold City Sport Complex, Alanya
Referee: Cansu Tiryaki (Turkey)
24 February 2024
16:30

| India | 2–0 | Hong Kong |
|---|---|---|
| Tamang 19'; Guguloth 79' | Report |

Gold City Sport Complex, Alanya
Referee: Melek Dakan (Turkey)

27 February 2024
11:00

| Kosovo | 1–0 | India |
|---|---|---|
| Memeti 90+2' | Report |

Gold City Sport Complex, Alanya
Referee: Gamze Durmuş (Turkey)
27 February 2024
15:30

| Estonia | 1–0 | Hong Kong |
|---|---|---|
| Kala 72' | Report |

Gold City Sport Complex, Alanya
Referee: Melis Özçiğdem (Turkey)

== Goalscorers ==
There were 15 goals scored in 6 matches, for an average of 2.5 goals per match.

2 goals

- (India) Manisha Kalyan
- (Kosovo) Elizabeta Ejupi

1 goal

- (Estonia) Lisette Tammik
- (Estonia) Vlada Kubassova
- (Estonia) Mari Liis Lillemäe
- (Estonia) Annegret Kala
- (India) Soumya Guguloth
- (India) Indumathi Kathiresan
- (India) Anju Tamang
- (India) Pyari Xaxa
- (Kosovo) Erëleta Memeti
- (Kosovo) Valentina Metaj
- (Kosovo) Modesta Uka

Source: GSA

== See also ==
- 2024 Pinatar Cup
- 2024 SheBelieves Cup
