= Elizabeta Ejupi =

Kosovan footballer (born 1994)

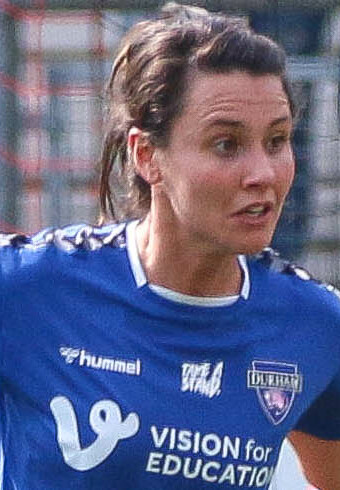
- Ejupi in action with Durham in 2022

Personal information
- Full name: Elizabeta Ejupi
- Date of birth: April 21, 1994 (age 32)
- Place of birth: Pristina, FR Yugoslavia
- Height: 1.80 m (5 ft 11 in)
- Position: Forward

Youth career
- 2005–2010: Charlton Athletic

Senior career*
Years	Team	Apps	(Gls)
2010–2013	Charlton Athletic	8	(0)
2013–2016	Nottingham Forest	29	(5)
2016–2017	Notts County	3	(0)
2017–2018	Aston Villa	15	(0)
2018–2019	Charlton Athletic	18	(13)
2019–2021	London City Lionesses	29	(7)
2021–2022	Durham	13	(2)
2023–2024	Sunderland	8	(3)

International career^{‡}
2009	England U15	1	(0)
2011–2012	Albania	3	(0)
2022–	Kosovo	8	(3)
- * Club domestic league appearances and goals as of 00:55, 16 April 2023 ‡ National team caps and goals as of 24 February 2024

Elizabeta "Liz" Ejupi is a professional footballer who plays as a forward. She last played for English club Sunderland. She has previously played for Charlton Athletic (two spells), Nottingham Forest, Notts County, Aston Villa, London City Lionesses, and Durham.

Born in Kosovo and raised in England, she represented England as a youth and Albania at full international level while still a teenager, with an intended switch to the Kosovo national team in 2021 delayed due to documentation issues.

== Club career ==
=== London City Lionesses ===
On 18 August 2019, FA Championship club London City Lionesses published the squad list for the 2019–20 season and Ejupi was included. That same day, she made her debut in a 2–0 away win against London Bees after being named in the starting line-up.

=== Durham ===
On 23 July 2021, Ejupi signed a one-season contract with FA Championship club Durham. On 29 August 2021, she made her debut in a 2–1 home win against Watford after being named in the starting line-up.

=== Sunderland ===
In January 2023, Ejupi left Durham and joined Sunderland.

== International career ==
=== England U15 and Albania ===
In 2009, Ejupi became part of England U15 with which she made her debut in a match against Germany U15. On 5 November 2011, she received her first senior international call-up from Albania for a friendly match against Macedonia, and made her debut in the nation's second ever international match after being named in the starting line-up.

=== Kosovo ===
On 11 June 2021, Ejupi received a call-up from Kosovo for a four-day training camp in Hajvalia. She was planned to be called up from Kosovo in September 2021 for the 2023 FIFA Women's World Cup qualification matches against Albania and Norway, but due to problems with documentation, namely the lack of passport, could not be part of the national team. Her debut with Kosovo came on 12 April 2022 in a 2023 FIFA Women's World Cup qualification match against Belgium when she came on as a 46th-minute substitute for Argnesa Rexhepi.

== Personal life ==
Ejupi was displaced as a refugee at the age of three along with her parents and brother due to the Kosovo War and the family came to London.

== International goals ==
No.	Date	Venue	Opponent	Score	Result	Competition
1.	15 February 2023	Gold City Sports Complex, Alanya, Turkey	Estonia	1–1	2–1	2023 Turkish Women's Cup
2.	21 February 2024	Gold City Sports Complex, Alanya, Turkey	Hong Kong	1–0	1–0	2024 Turkish Women's Cup
3.	24 February 2024	Gold City Sports Complex, Alanya, Turkey	Estonia	2–0	3–0	2024 Turkish Women's Cup

== See also ==
- List of Kosovo women's international footballers
- List of Albania women's international footballers
