= 2023 Turkish Women's Cup =

Tournament details
- Host country: Turkey
- Dates: 15–21 February
- Teams: 12 (from 4 confederations)
- Venue(s): 2 (in 1 host city)

Final positions
- Champions: Kosovo; Slovenia (1st title)
- Runners-up: Bulgaria; South Africa

Tournament statistics
- Matches played: 11
- Goals scored: 33 (3 per match)
- Top scorer(s): (Bulgaria) Evdokiya Popadinova (3 goals)
- Best player(s): (Kosovo) Erëleta Memeti

The 2023 Turkish Women's Cup was the seventh edition of the Turkish Women's Cup, the annual women's football tournament held in Alanya, Turkey for the women's national association football teams. The tournament took place from 15 to 21 February 2023. Kosovo and Slovenia were crowned champions of the tournament after finishing unbeaten in three games.

== Participating teams ==
Twelve football associations from four confederations (namely UEFA, CONMEBOL, CAF and AFC) confirmed their participation in the tournament. On 10 February 2023, the Venezuelan Football Federation announced that Venezuela wouldn't attend the tournament due to the 2023 Turkey–Syria earthquake. Two days later, the Jordan Football Association did the same.

Team	App	FIFA ranking December 2022
Slovenia	1st	43
Uzbekistan	4th	49
~~Venezuela~~	2nd	52
South Africa	1st	54
~~Turkey~~	2nd	64
~~Jordan~~	3rd	69
Hong Kong	2nd	77
Zambia	1st	81
Estonia	1st	91
Bulgaria	2nd	92
Kosovo	3rd	111
North Macedonia	1st	131

== Group stage ==
All times are local (UTC+3).

=== Group A ===
Pos	Team	Pld	W	D	L	GF	GA	GD	Pts	Final result
1	Slovenia	3	2	1	0	4	2	+2	7	Champions
2	South Africa	2	1	1	0	4	1	+3	4	Runners-up
3	Zambia	2	1	0	1	4	1	+3	3	
4	Uzbekistan	3	0	0	3	1	9	−8	0	
5	Turkey (Note: Turkey withdrew before the tournament.) (H)	0	0	0	0	0	0	0	0	Withdrawn
6	Venezuela (Note: Venezuela withdrew before the tournament.)	0	0	0	0	0	0	0	0	Withdrawn

Source: Soccerway
(H) Hosts
Notes:
15 February 2023
19:00

Slovenia	2–1	Uzbekistan
Prašnikar 32'; Erman 67'	Report	Karachik 72'

Miracle Sport Complex, Alanya
Referee: Melis Özçiğdem (Turkey)

18 February 2023
19:00

South Africa	3–0	Uzbekistan
Seoposenwe 10'; Tojiddinova 13' (o.g.); Cesane 25'	Report

Gold City Sport Complex, Alanya
18 February 2023
19:00

Zambia	0–1	Slovenia
	Report	Zver 18'

Miracle Sport Complex, Alanya

21 February 2023
11:00

Uzbekistan	0–4	Zambia
	Report	Chanda 8'; Nachula 58'; Kundananji 61'; Banda 67'

Miracle Sport Complex, Alanya
21 February 2023
11:00

South Africa	1–1	Slovenia
Magaia 73'	Report	Mori 13'

Miracle Sport Complex, Alanya

=== Group B ===
Pos	Team	Pld	W	D	L	GF	GA	GD	Pts	Final result
1	Kosovo	3	3	0	0	11	2	+9	9	Champions
2	Bulgaria	3	2	0	1	5	3	+2	6	Runners-up
3	North Macedonia	2	0	1	1	2	3	−1	1	
4	Estonia	2	0	1	1	2	3	−1	1	
5	Hong Kong	2	0	0	2	0	9	−9	0	
6	Jordan (Note: Jordan withdrew before the tournament.)	0	0	0	0	0	0	0	0	Withdrawn

Source: Soccerway
Notes:
15 February 2023
15:00

Bulgaria	2–0	Hong Kong
Popadinova 10'; Naydenova 22'	Report

Gold City Sport Complex, Alanya
15 February 2023
18:30

Estonia	1–2	Kosovo
Kubassova 16'	Report	Ejupi 37'; Memeti 69'

Gold City Sport Complex, Alanya
Referee: Cansu Tiryaki (Turkey)

18 February 2023
11:00

Kosovo	7–0	Hong Kong
Guri 30'; Biqkaj 65', 79'; Metaj 84'; Shala 89', 90+1'; Halilaj 90+3'	Report

Gold City Sport Complex, Alanya
Referee: Cansu Tiryaki (Turkey)
18 February 2023
15:00

North Macedonia	1–2	Bulgaria
Rochi 9'	Report	Yaneva 14'; Popadinova 86'

Gold City Sport Complex, Alanya

21 February 2023
11:00

Bulgaria	1–2	Kosovo
Popadinova 19'	Report	Memeti 10'; Metaj 40'

Gold City Sport Complex, Alanya
21 February 2023
15:00

Estonia	1–1	North Macedonia
Tammik 21'	Report	Andonova 60'

Gold City Sport Complex, Alanya
Referee: Cansu Tiryaki (Turkey)

== Goalscorers ==
There were 33 goals scored in 11 matches, for an average of 3 goals per match.

3 goals

- (Bulgaria) Evdokiya Popadinova

2 goals

- (Kosovo) Kaltrina Biqkaj
- (Kosovo) Erëleta Memeti
- (Kosovo) Valentina Metaj
- (Kosovo) Jehona Shala

1 goal

- (Bulgaria) Ivana Naydenova
- (Bulgaria) Aleksandra Yaneva
- (Estonia) Vlada Kubassova
- (Estonia) Lisette Tammik
- (Kosovo) Elizabeta Ejupi
- (Kosovo) Albulena Guri
- (Kosovo) Donjeta Halilaj
- (North Macedonia) Nataša Andonova
- (North Macedonia) Gentjana Rochi
- (Slovenia) Kristina Erman
- (Slovenia) Adrijana Mori
- (Slovenia) Lara Prašnikar
- (Slovenia) Mateja Zver
- (South Africa) Noxolo Cesane
- (South Africa) Hildah Magaia
- (South Africa) Jermaine Seoposenwe
- (Uzbekistan) Lyudmila Karachik
- (Zambia) Barbra Banda
- (Zambia) Grace Chanda
- (Zambia) Racheal Kundananji
- (Zambia) Rachael Nachula

1 own goal

- (Uzbekistan) Shokhida Tojiddinova (against South Africa)
