= Donjeta Halilaj =

Kosovan footballer (born 2000)

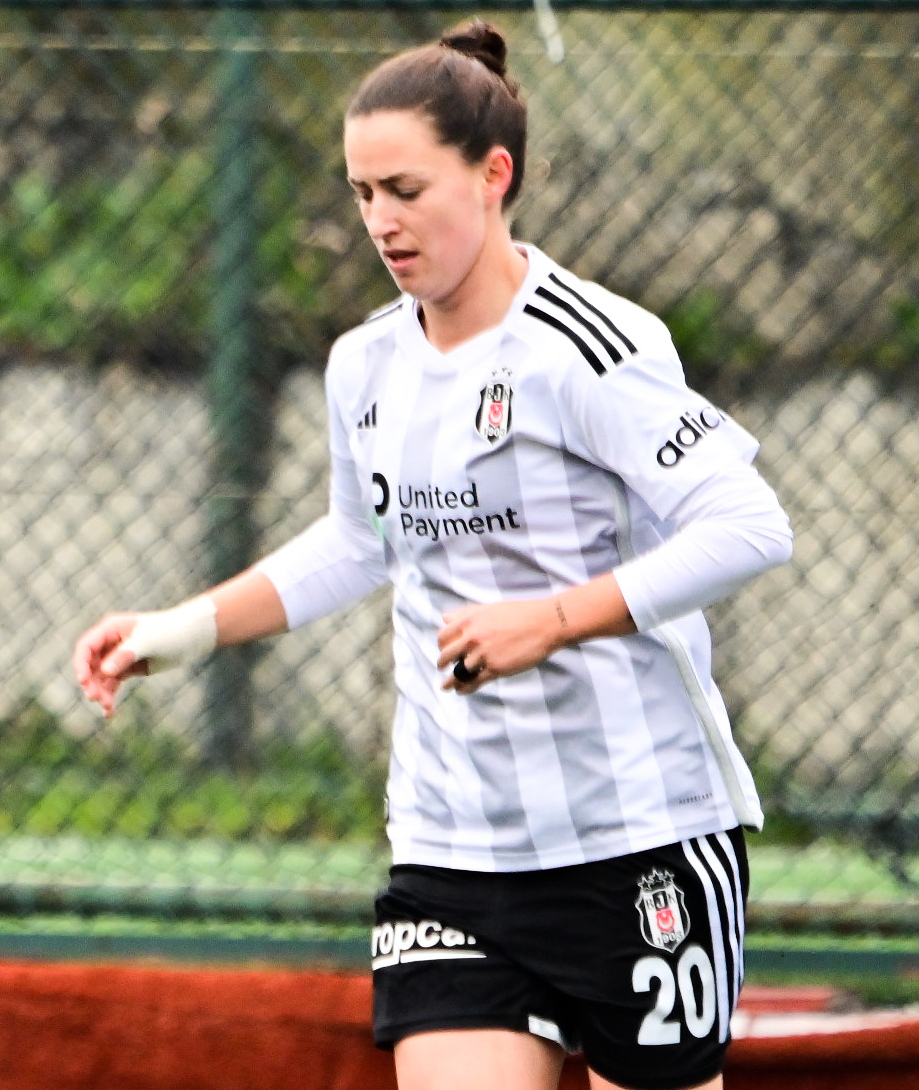

Personal information
- Date of birth: 12 March 2000 (age 26)
- Place of birth: Gjakova, Kosovo under UN administration
- Position: Midfielder

Team information
- Current team: Trabzon
- Number: 10

Youth career
- 2016-18: Hajvalia

Senior career*
Years	Team	Apps	(Gls)
2019-21	Mitrovica		
2021-22	→ KF Vllaznia Shkodër (loan)		
2022-23	Mitrovica		
2023-2025	Beşiktaş	50	(13)
2025-	Trabzon	2	(0)

International career^{‡}
2018	Albania U19	3	(1)
2019–	Kosovo	23	(3)
- * Club domestic league appearances and goals as of 5 October 2025 ‡ National team caps and goals as of 23:51, 31 August 2019 (UTC)

Donjeta Halilaj (born 12 March 2000) is a Kosovan footballer who plays as a forward for Trabzon in the Turkish Super League, and has appeared for the Kosovo women's national team. She plays for Beşiktaş J.K.

== Club career ==
Halilaj moved to Turkey in August 2023, and signed with the Super League club Beşiktaş.

In September 2025, she transferred to Trabzon.

== International career ==
Halilaj has been capped for the Kosovo national team, appearing for the team during the UEFA Women's Euro 2021 qualifying cycle.

== International goals ==
Scores and results list Kosovo's goal tally first.

No.	Date	Venue	Opponent	Score	Result	Competition
1.	8 April 2021	Petar Miloševski Training Centre, Skopje, North Macedonia	North Macedonia	1–0	3–1	Friendly
2.	1 September 2022	Fadil Vokrri Stadium, Pristina, Kosovo	Armenia	2–1	2–1	2023 FIFA Women's World Cup qualification
3.	18 February 2023	Gold City Sports Complex, Alanya, Turkey	Hong Kong	7–0	7–0	2023 Turkish Women's Cup
4.	6 April 2023	Boyana Sports Complex, Sofia, Bulgaria	Latvia	1–0	1–0	Friendly
5.	16 July 2023	FFK National Camp Education, Hajvalia, Kosovo	Liechtenstein	1–0	2–0	Friendly
6.	31 October 2023	Fadil Vokkri Stadium, Pristina, Kosovo	North Macedonia	1–0	3–1	2023–24 UEFA Women's Nations League
7.	1 December 2023	Zahir Pajaziti Stadium, Podujevë, Kosovo	Bulgaria	1–1	5–1	2023–24 UEFA Women's Nations League
8.	2 December 2024	Fadil Vokkri Stadium, Pristina, Kosovo	Estonia	1–2	1–2	Friendly
9.	9 June 2026	Europa Sports Park, Europa Point, Gibraltar	Gibraltar	1–0	8–0	2027 FIFA Women's World Cup qualification

== See also ==
- List of Kosovo women's international footballers
