= 2023 FIFA Women's World Cup qualification – UEFA Group F =

UEFA Group F of the 2023 FIFA Women's World Cup qualification competition consists of six teams: Norway, Belgium, Poland, Albania, Kosovo, and Armenia. The composition of the nine groups in the qualifying group stage was decided by the draw held on 30 April 2021, with the teams seeded according to their coefficient ranking.

The group is played in home-and-away round-robin format between 16 September 2021 and 6 September 2022, with a pause for the Women's Euro 2022 in July. The group winners qualify for the final tournament, while the runners-up advance to the play-offs first round if they are one of the other six runners-up among all nine groups (not counting results against the sixth-placed team).

== Standings ==
| Pos | Team | Pld | W | D | L | GF | GA | GD | Pts | Qualification | (Norway) | (Belgium) | (Poland) | (Albania) | (Kosovo) | (Armenia) |
|---|---|---|---|---|---|---|---|---|---|---|---|---|---|---|---|---|
| 1 | Norway | 10 | 9 | 1 | 0 | 47 | 2 | +45 | 28 | 2023 FIFA Women's World Cup | — | 4–0 | 2–1 | 5–0 | 5–1 | 10–0 |
| 2 | Belgium | 10 | 7 | 1 | 2 | 56 | 7 | +49 | 22 | Play-offs | 0–1 | — | 4–0 | 7–0 | 7–0 | 19–0 |
| 3 | Poland | 10 | 6 | 2 | 2 | 28 | 9 | +19 | 20 | | 0–0 | 1–1 | — | 2–0 | 7–0 | 12–0 |
| 4 | Albania | 10 | 3 | 1 | 6 | 14 | 30 | −16 | 10 | | 0–7 | 0–5 | 1–2 | — | 1–1 | 5–0 |
| 5 | Kosovo | 10 | 2 | 1 | 7 | 8 | 35 | −27 | 7 | | 0–3 | 1–6 | 1–2 | 1–3 | — | 2–1 |
| 6 | Armenia | 10 | 0 | 0 | 10 | 1 | 71 | −70 | 0 | | 0–10 | 0–7 | 0–1 | 0–4 | 0–1 | — |

Source: UEFA
Rules for classification: Tiebreakers

== Matches ==
Times are CET/CEST, (Note: CEST (UTC+2) for dates between 28 March and 31 October 2021 and between 27 March and 30 October 2022, and CET (UTC+1) for all other dates.) as listed by UEFA (local times, if different, are in parentheses).

16 September 2021
18:00

| Norway | 10–0 | Armenia |
|---|---|---|
| Bergsvand 10'; Graham Hansen 28' (pen.), 78', 90+5'; Sævik 38'; Utland 47', 79', 87'; Blakstad 62'; Terland 90' | Report (FIFA); Report (UEFA) |

Ullevaal Stadion, Oslo
Attendance: 1,229
Referee: Rasa Grigonė (Lithuania)
16 September 2021
19:00

| Albania | 1–1 | Kosovo |
|---|---|---|
| Doci 43' (pen.) | Report (FIFA); Report (UEFA) | Limani 71' |

Elbasan Arena, Elbasan
Referee: Elvira Nurmustafina (Kazakhstan)
17 September 2021
19:00

| Poland | 1–1 | Belgium |
|---|---|---|
| Pajor 40' | Report (FIFA); Report (UEFA) | Cayman 79' |

Gdańsk Stadium, Gdańsk
Attendance: 8011
Referee: Iuliana Demetrescu (Romania)

21 September 2021
17:30 (19:30 AMT)

| Armenia | 0–1 | Poland |
|---|---|---|
| | Report (FIFA); Report (UEFA) | Zawistowska 27' |

Vazgen Sargsyan Republican Stadium, Yerevan
Referee: Catarina Campos (Portugal)
21 September 2021
19:00

| Kosovo | 0–3 | Norway |
|---|---|---|
| | Report (FIFA); Report (UEFA) | Avduli 12' (o.g.); Blakstad 36'; Utland 56' |

Fadil Vokrri Stadium, Pristina
Attendance: 200
Referee: Reelika Turi (Estonia)
21 September 2021
20:30

| Belgium | 7–0 | Albania |
|---|---|---|
| Cayman 6'; De Caigny 26', 50'; Blom 77', 78', 85'; Wullaert 81' | Report (FIFA); Report (UEFA) |

King Baudouin Stadium, Brussels
Attendance: 2,612
Referee: Désirée Grundbacher (Switzerland)

21 October 2021
17:00

| Albania | 5–0 | Armenia |
|---|---|---|
| Doci 12', 44'; Hamidi 16', 62'; Lufo 90+1' | Report (FIFA); Report (UEFA) |

Arena Kombëtare, Tirana
Referee: Maria Marotta (Italy)
21 October 2021
20:00

| Belgium | 7–0 | Kosovo |
|---|---|---|
| Vanhaevermaet 3', 36'; Cayman 9'; Wullaert 16', 51', 69'; De Caigny 28' | Report (FIFA); Report (UEFA) |

Den Dreef, Leuven
Referee: Jelena Kumer (Croatia)
21 October 2021
19:15

| Poland | 0–0 | Norway |
|---|---|---|
| | Report (FIFA); Report (UEFA) |

Stadion Miejski Widzewa, Łódź
Referee: Jana Adámková (Czech Republic)

26 October 2021
16:00 (19:00 AMT)

| Armenia | 0–1 | Kosovo |
|---|---|---|
| | Report (FIFA); Report (UEFA) | Syla 87' |

Vazgen Sargsyan Republican Stadium, Yerevan
Referee: Viola Raudziņa (Latvia)
26 October 2021
19:00

| Norway | 4–0 | Belgium |
|---|---|---|
| Bergsvand 6'; Graham Hansen 30'; Terland 68'; Syrstad Engen 90+1' | Report (FIFA); Report (UEFA) |

Ullevaal Stadion, Oslo
Referee: Rebecca Welch (England)
26 October 2021
19:45

| Poland | 2–0 | Albania |
|---|---|---|
| Dudek 40' (pen.); Mesjasz 89' | Report (FIFA); Report (UEFA) |

Stadion Miejski, Tychy
Referee: Simona Ghisletta (Switzerland)

25 November 2021
16:00

| Kosovo | 1–2 | Poland |
|---|---|---|
| Syla 4' | Report (FIFA); Report (UEFA) | Gec 17'; Wiankowska 34' |

Fadil Vokrri Stadium, Pristina
Referee: Galiya Echeva (Bulgaria)
25 November 2021
20:00

| Belgium | 19–0 | Armenia |
|---|---|---|
| Eurlings 3', 30'; Wullaert 5', 34', 51', 90', 90+2'; Wijnants 8'; Tysiak 10', 24', 72'; De Caigny 17', 28', 33'; Vanhaevermaet 39'; Teulings 78', 90+4'; Cayman 81', 88' | Report (FIFA); Report (UEFA) |

Den Dreef, Leuven
Referee: Kirsty Dowle (England)
25 November 2021
20:10

| Albania | 0–7 | Norway |
|---|---|---|
| | Report (FIFA); Report (UEFA) | Maanum 23', 77'; Reiten 60'; Thorisdottir 62'; Sævik 72'; Hasund 81'; Terland 84' |

Arena Kombëtare, Tirana
Referee: Miriama Matulova (Slovakia)

30 November 2021 (Note: Suspended in the 71st minute at 0–9 due to adverse weather. The match was resumed at 11:00 AMT on 1 December.)
14:00 (17:00 AMT)

| Armenia | 0–10 | Norway |
|---|---|---|
| | Report (FIFA); Report (UEFA) | Terland 31', 34'; Utland 43', 56'; Maanum 47'; Reiten 51'; Sønstevold 59'; Bergsvand 63'; Ildhusøy 69'; Syrstad Engen 81' (pen.) |

Yerevan Football Academy Stadium, Yerevan
Referee: Victoria Beyer (France)
30 November 2021
16:00

| Kosovo | 1–3 | Albania |
|---|---|---|
| Biqkaj 45+3' | Report (FIFA); Report (UEFA) | Maksuti 19'; Doci 45'; Krasniqi 83' |

Fadil Vokrri Stadium, Pristina
Referee: Lovisa Johansson (Sweden)
30 November 2021
20:00

| Belgium | 4–0 | Poland |
|---|---|---|
| De Caigny 15'; Eurlings 33'; Cayman 38'; Mesjasz 51' (o.g.) | Report (FIFA); Report (UEFA) |

Den Dreef, Leuven
Referee: Marta Huerta de Aza (Spain)

7 April 2022
18:00

| Norway | 5–1 | Kosovo |
|---|---|---|
| Hegerberg 21', 23', 60'; Maanum 31'; Ildhusøy 84' | Report (FIFA); Report (UEFA) | Memeti 55' |

Sandefjord Arena, Sandefjord
Referee: Tanja Subotič (Slovenia)
7 April 2022
18:30

| Albania | 0–5 | Belgium |
|---|---|---|
| | Report (FIFA); Report (UEFA) | De Caigny 37', 43'; Wullaert 39', 57'; Blom 79' |

Elbasan Arena, Elbasan
Referee: Eszter Urbán (Hungary)
7 April 2022
20:15

| Poland | 12–0 | Armenia |
|---|---|---|
| Karczewska 4', 24', 27', 46', 51', 73'; Zawistowska 17', 58'; Grabowska 44'; Achcińska 45+2'; Buszewska 65'; Zapała 67' | Report (FIFA); Report (UEFA) |

Stadion Miejski w Gdyni, Gdynia
Referee: Désirée Grundbache (Switzerland)

12 April 2022
12:30 (14:30 AMT)

| Armenia | 0–4 | Albania |
|---|---|---|
| | Report (FIFA); Report (UEFA) | Doci 13'; Maksuti 23', 58'; Gjini 45+2' |

Armavir City Stadium, Armavir
Referee: Angelika Söder (Germany)
12 April 2022
19:00

| Norway | 2–1 | Poland |
|---|---|---|
| Grzywińska 8' (o.g.); Graham Hansen 16' | Report (FIFA); Report (UEFA) | Karczewska 58' |

Ullevaal Stadion, Oslo
Referee: Ivana Projkovska (North Macedonia)
12 April 2022
20:00

| Kosovo | 1–6 | Belgium |
|---|---|---|
| Memeti 68' | Report (FIFA); Report (UEFA) | De Caigny 22'; Wullaert 41', 44', 54', 65' (pen.); Minnaert 77' |

Fadil Vokrri Stadium, Pristina
Referee: Eleni Antoniou (Greece)

1 September 2022
18:00

| Albania | 1–2 | Poland |
|---|---|---|
| Krasniqi 11' | Report (FIFA); Report (UEFA) | Pajor 24', 30' (pen.) |

Elbasan Arena, Elbasan
Referee: Lorraine Watson (Scotland)
1 September 2022
19:00

| Kosovo | 2–1 | Armenia |
|---|---|---|
| Metaj 78'; Halilaj 87' | Report (FIFA); Report (UEFA) | Smaili 77' (o.g.) |

Fadil Vokrri Stadium, Pristina
Referee: Jelena Jermolajeva (Latvia)
2 September 2022
20:30

| Belgium | 0–1 | Norway |
|---|---|---|
| | Report (FIFA); Report (UEFA) | T. Hansen 61' |

Den Dreef, Leuven
Referee: Esther Staubli (Switzerland)

6 September 2022
18:30 (20:30 AMT)

| Armenia | 0–7 | Belgium |
|---|---|---|
| | Report (FIFA); Report (UEFA) | Eurlings 10'; Van Kerkhoven 24', 51', 55'; Vanhaevermaet 31'; Wullaert 41'; Kees 80' |

Yerevan Football Academy Stadium, Yerevan
Referee: Tanja Subotič (Slovenia)
6 September 2022
18:30

| Norway | 5–0 | Albania |
|---|---|---|
| Haug 12', 15', 66'; Mjelde 23'; Hørte 70' | Report (FIFA); Report (UEFA) |

Ullevaal Stadion, Oslo
Referee: Rasa Grigonė (Lithuania)
6 September 2022
18:30

| Poland | 7–0 | Kosovo |
|---|---|---|
| Dudek 3'; Lefeld 12'; Pajor 13', 37', 53' (pen.); Mesjasz 35'; Kozak 72' | Report (FIFA); Report (UEFA) |

Arena Lublin, Lublin
Referee: Triinu Laos (Estonia)

== Goalscorers ==
There were 154 goals scored in 30 matches, for an average of 5.13 goals per match.

16 goals

- (Belgium) Tessa Wullaert

10 goals

- (Belgium) Tine De Caigny

7 goals

- (Poland) Nikola Karczewska

6 goals

- (Belgium) Janice Cayman
- (Norway) Lisa-Marie Karlseng Utland
- (Poland) Ewa Pajor

5 goals

- (Albania) Megi Doci
- (Norway) Caroline Graham Hansen
- (Norway) Elisabeth Terland

4 goals

- (Belgium) Jassina Blom
- (Belgium) Hannah Eurlings
- (Belgium) Justine Vanhaevermaet
- (Norway) Frida Maanum

3 goals

- (Albania) Kristina Maksuti
- (Belgium) Amber Tysiak
- (Belgium) Ella Van Kerkhoven
- (Norway) Guro Bergsvand
- (Norway) Sophie Román Haug
- (Norway) Ada Hegerberg
- (Poland) Weronika Zawistowska

2 goals

- (Albania) Mimoza Hamidi
- (Albania) Qendresa Krasniqi
- (Belgium) Jarne Teulings
- (Kosovo) Erëleta Memeti
- (Kosovo) Liridona Syla
- (Norway) Julie Blakstad
- (Norway) Ingrid Syrstad Engen
- (Norway) Celin Bizet Ildhusøy
- (Norway) Guro Reiten
- (Norway) Karina Sævik
- (Poland) Paulina Dudek
- (Poland) Małgorzata Mesjasz

1 goal

- (Albania) Luçije Gjini
- (Albania) Esi Lufo
- (Belgium) Sari Kees
- (Belgium) Marie Minnaert
- (Belgium) Sarah Wijnants
- (Kosovo) Kaltrina Biqkaj
- (Kosovo) Donjeta Halilaj
- (Kosovo) Valentina Limani
- (Kosovo) Valentina Metaj
- (Norway) Tuva Hansen
- (Norway) Vilde Hasund
- (Norway) Sara Hørte
- (Norway) Maren Mjelde
- (Norway) Anja Sønstevold
- (Norway) Maria Thorisdottir
- (Poland) Adriana Achcińska
- (Poland) Zofia Buszewska
- (Poland) Karolina Gec
- (Poland) Dominika Grabowska
- (Poland) Kinga Kozak
- (Poland) Klaudia Lefeld
- (Poland) Martyna Wiankowska
- (Poland) Anna Zapała

1 own goal

- (Kosovo) Viola Avduli (against Norway)
- (Kosovo) Blerta Smaili (against Armenia)
- (Poland) Gabriela Grzywińska (against Norway)
- (Poland) Małgorzata Mesjasz (against Belgium)
