= Martyna Wiankowska =

Polish footballer

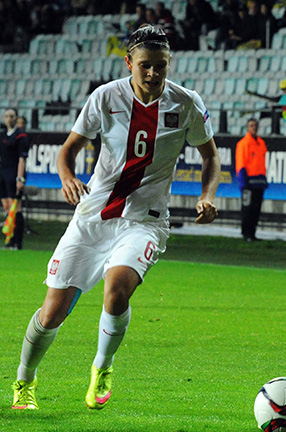
- Wiankowska with Poland in 2015

Personal information
- Date of birth: 24 December 1996 (age 29)
- Place of birth: Łowicz, Poland
- Height: 1.70 m (5 ft 7 in)
- Positions: Left-back; winger

Team information
- Current team: Como 1907
- Number: 26

Youth career
- Olimpia Chąśno
- Pelikan Łowicz

Senior career*
Years	Team	Apps	(Gls)
2013–2014	Pelikan Łowicz		
2014–2018	UKS SMS Łódź		
2018–2022	Czarni Sosnowiec	77	(51)
2022–2023	Turbine Potsdam	20	(2)
2023–2026	1. FC Köln	56	(6)
2026–	Como 1907	2	(1)

International career^{‡}
2015–	Poland	104	(12)
- * Club domestic league appearances and goals as of 10:25, 6 October 2026 (UTC) ‡ National team caps and goals as of 20:24, 9 October 2026 (UTC)

Martyna Wiankowska (born 24 December 1996) is a Polish professional footballer who plays as a left-back or winger for the Serie A club Como 1907 and the Poland national team.

== Career ==
Wiankowska has been capped for the Poland national team, appearing for the team during the 2019 FIFA Women's World Cup qualifying cycle.

She was selected for the UEFA Women's Euro 2025, the first time the Polish national team qualified for a women's football major tournament. On 12 July 2025, in Poland's third and final game at the tournament, Wiankowska scored the game-winning goal in the 77th minute of a 3–2 victory over Denmark.

== Career statistics ==
=== International ===
As of match played 9 October 2026

Appearances and goals by national team and year
National team	Year	Apps	Goals
Poland	2015	7	1
Poland	2016	11	1
Poland	2017	8	0
Poland	2018	10	1
Poland	2019	7	0
Poland	2020	1	0
Poland	2021	10	1
Poland	2022	10	5
Poland	2023	10	0
Poland	2024	12	1
Poland	2025	13	2
Poland	2026	5	0
Total		104	12

Scores and results list Poland's goal tally first, score column indicates score after each Wiankowska goal.

List of international goals scored by Martyna Wiankowska
No.	Date	Venue	Opponent	Score	Result	Competition
1	1 August 2015	Balatonfüred, Hungary	Belarus		2–2 (3–0 p)	Friendly
2	7 March 2016	GSZ Stadium, Larnaca, Cyprus	Finland	1–0	1–0	2016 Cyprus Women's Cup
3	28 February 2018	Kargıcak, Turkey	Jordan	2–0	2–0	2018 Turkish Women's Cup
4	25 November 2021	Fadil Vokrri Stadium, Pristina, Kosovo	Kosovo	2–1	2–1	2023 FIFA World Cup qualification
5	9 October 2022	Estadio Municipal de Chapín, Jerez de la Frontera, Spain	Argentina	1–2	2–2	Friendly
6	9 October 2022	Estadio Municipal de Chapín, Jerez de la Frontera, Spain	Argentina	2–2	2–2	Friendly
7	11 November 2022	KSZO Municipal Sports Stadium, Ostrowiec Świętokrzyski, Poland	Romania	2–0	6–0	Friendly
8	11 November 2022	KSZO Municipal Sports Stadium, Ostrowiec Świętokrzyski, Poland	Romania	5–0	6–0	Friendly
9	11 November 2022	KSZO Municipal Sports Stadium, Ostrowiec Świętokrzyski, Poland	Romania	6–0	6–0	Friendly
10	27 February 2024	Marbella Football Center, Marbella, Spain	Switzerland	1–0	1–0	Friendly
11	4 April 2025	Gdańsk Stadium, Gdańsk, Poland	Bosnia and Herzegovina	5–1	5–1	2025 UEFA Nations League
12	12 July 2025	Swissporarena, Lucerne, Switzerland	Denmark	3–1	3–2	UEFA Women's Euro 2025

== Honours ==
Czarni Sosnowiec

- Ekstraliga: 2020–21
- Polish Cup: 2020–21, 2021–22

Individual

- Polish Cup top scorer: 2019–20
