= Valentina Limani =

Kosovan footballer (born 1997)

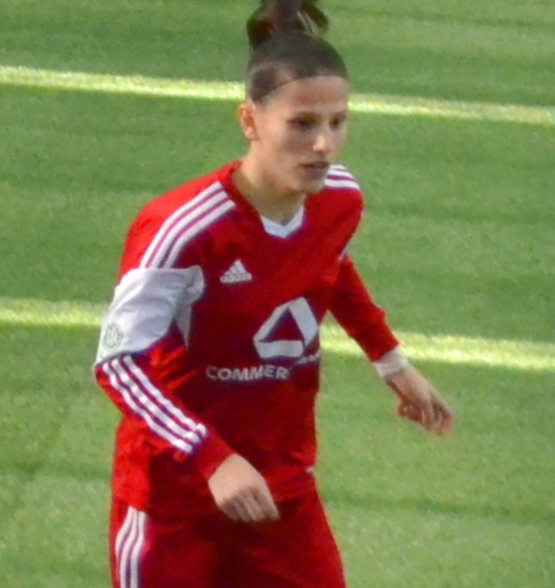
- Limani with 1. FFC Frankfurt II in January 2017

Personal information
- Full name: Valentina Hiset Limani
- Date of birth: 2 February 1997 (age 29)
- Place of birth: Komogllavë, FR Yugoslavia
- Height: 1.61 m (5 ft 3 in)
- Position: Forward

Team information
- Current team: Eintracht Frankfurt III
- Number: 24

Youth career
- 2009–2014: 1. FFC Frankfurt

Senior career*
Years	Team	Apps	(Gls)
2013–2020	1. FFC Frankfurt II	104	(27)
2014–2018	1. FFC Frankfurt	2	(0)
2021–	Eintracht Frankfurt III	1	(0)

International career^{‡}
2017–	Kosovo	23	(3)
- * Club domestic league appearances and goals as of 12 September 2021 ‡ National team caps and goals as of 21 September 2021

Valentina Limani (born 2 February 1997) is a Kosovan professional footballer who plays as a forward for German club Eintracht Frankfurt III and the Kosovo national team.

== Club career ==
=== 1. FFC Frankfurt/Eintracht Frankfurt ===
==== Early career and period at second team ====
Limani was born in Komogllavë, and raised in Germany in a family of footballers. Her younger brother, Gentrit, is a footballer and an important player in Kosovo national youth teams. At the age of 12, she started playing football in 1. FFC Frankfurt. On 8 September 2013, Limani made her senior debut with 1. FFC Frankfurt II in a 0–2 home defeat against TSV Crailsheim after coming on as a substitute at 46th minute in place of Larissa Gördel.

==== Promotion to the first team ====
On 10 July 2014, Limani was promoted and included in the list of first team players competing in the Bundesliga. On 14 December 2014, she made her debut in a 0–4 away win against MSV Duisburg after coming on as a substitute at 87th minute in place of Verónica Boquete.

==== Short retirement and return as part of the third team ====
On 4 November 2020, Limani confirmed through an interview that she has retired due to schooling and in football is expected to return as coach. On 2 July 2021, Limani returned from retirement and joined Regionalliga side Eintracht Frankfurt III. On 12 September 2021, she made her debut in a 4–2 home win against SV Gläserzell after being named in the starting line-up.

== International career ==
=== First period ===
On 27 February 2017, Limani was named as part of the Kosovo squad for 2017 Turkish Women's Cup. On 1 March 2017, she made her debut with Kosovo in 2017 Turkish Women's Cup group stage match against Poland after being named in the starting line-up. On 26 November 2017, Limani scored her first goal for Kosovo in her seventh appearance for the country in a 3–2 home minimal win over Montenegro. Her last international match was on 10 March 2020 against Slovenia in Pristina.

=== Second period ===
Kosovo is the reason why I came back to play football.

— Limani's reasoning for returning from retirement.

On 14 February 2021, Limani upon return from retirement received a call-up from Kosovo for the 2023 FIFA Women's World Cup qualification matches against Albania and Norway. Two days later, she made her first match with Kosovo after return from retirement in 2023 FIFA Women's World Cup qualification match against Albania after coming on as a substitute at 46th minute in place of Blerta Smaili and scored his side's only goal during a 1–1 away draw.

== Career statistics ==
=== Club ===
As of 12 September 2021

Club	Season	League			Cup		Other		Total	
Club	Season	Division	Apps	Goals	Apps	Goals	Apps	Goals	Apps	Goals
1. FFC Frankfurt II	2013–14	2. Bundesliga Süd	2	0	0	0	—		2	0
1. FFC Frankfurt	2014–15	Bundesliga	1	0	0	0	16 (Note: Appearance(s) with 1. FFC Frankfurt II)	2	17	2
1. FFC Frankfurt II	2015–16	2. Bundesliga Süd	20	3	0	0	—		20	3
1. FFC Frankfurt	2016–17	Bundesliga	1	0	0	0	22	12	23	12
1. FFC Frankfurt II	2017–18	2. Bundesliga Süd	10	3	0	0	—		10	3
1. FFC Frankfurt II	2018–19	2. Bundesliga	22	5	0	0	—		22	5
1. FFC Frankfurt II	2019–20	2. Bundesliga	12	2	0	0	—		12	2
1. FFC Frankfurt II	Total		68	13	0	0	38	14	106	27
Eintracht Frankfurt II	2020–21	2. Bundesliga	0	0	0	0	0	0	0	0
Eintracht Frankfurt III	2021–22	Regionalliga	1	0	0	0	0	0	1	0
Career total			69	13	0	0	38	14	107	27

=== International ===
As of 21 September 2021

Appearances and goals by national team and year
National team	Year	Apps	Goals
Kosovo
Kosovo	2017	7	1
Kosovo	2018	8	0
Kosovo	2019	4	1
Kosovo	2020	2	0
Kosovo	2021	2	1
Total		23	3

==== International goals ====
As of 16 September 2021
Scores and results list Kosovo's goal tally first.

No.	Date	Venue	Opponent	Score	Result	Competition	Ref.
1.	26 November 2017	Adem Jashari Olympic Stadium, Mitrovica, Kosovo	Montenegro	1–1	3–2	Friendly	
2.	5 April 2019	Gjakova City Stadium, Gjakova, Kosovo	North Macedonia	2–0	3–1	Friendly	
3.	16 September 2021	Elbasan Arena, Elbasan, Albania	Albania	1–1	1–1	2023 FIFA World Cup qualification	
