= Małgorzata Mesjasz =

Polish footballer (born 1997)

Personal information
- Full name: Małgorzata Anna Mesjasz
- Date of birth: 12 June 1997 (age 29)
- Place of birth: Częstochowa, Poland
- Position: Defender

Team information
- Current team: Górnik Łęczna

Youth career
- Olimpijczyk Częstochowa

Senior career*
Years	Team	Apps	(Gls)
2013–2014	Gol Częstochowa		
2014–2015	AZS AWF Katowice		
2015–2019	AZS PWSZ Wałbrzych		
2019–2022	Turbine Potsdam	60	(9)
2022–2025	AC Milan	49	(6)
2025–2026	Lazio	15	(0)
2026–	Górnik Łęczna	0	(0)

International career^{‡}
2018–	Poland	52	(4)
- * Club domestic league appearances and goals as of 19:56, 2 June 2026 (UTC) ‡ National team caps and goals as of 27 June 2025

Małgorzata Anna Mesjasz (born 12 June 1997) is a Polish professional footballer who plays as a defender for Ekstraliga club Górnik Łęczna and the Poland national team.

== Career ==
Mesjasz has been capped for the Poland national team, appearing for the team during the 2019 FIFA Women's World Cup qualifying cycle. In June 2025, she was called up for the UEFA Women's Euro 2025, Poland's first-ever appearance at a major tournament.

== Career statistics ==
=== International ===
As of match played 27 June 2025

Appearances and goals by national team and year
National team	Year	Apps	Goals
Poland	2018	5	0
Poland	2019	8	1
Poland	2020	6	1
Poland	2021	10	1
Poland	2022	11	1
Poland	2023	4	0
Poland	2024	6	0
Poland	2025	2	0
Total		52	4

Scores and results list Poland's goal tally first, score column indicates score after each Mesjasz goal.

List of international goals scored by Małgorzata Mesjasz
No.	Date	Venue	Opponent	Score	Result	Competition
1	8 November 2019	Kielce Municipal Stadium, Kielce, Poland	Brazil	1–0	1–3	Friendly
2	23 October 2020	General Kazimierz Sosnkowski Municipal Stadium, Warsaw, Poland	Azerbaijan	1–0	3–0	UEFA Euro 2022 qualifying
3	26 October 2021	Tychy Municipal Stadium, Tychy, Poland	Albania	2–0	2–0	2023 FIFA World Cup qualification
4	6 September 2022	Arena Lublin, Lublin, Poland	Kosovo	4–0	7–0	2023 FIFA World Cup qualification
