= Kaltrina Biqkaj =

Kosovan footballer (born 2000)

Personal information
- Date of birth: 5 August 2000 (age 26)
- Position: Forward

Team information
- Current team: Trabzon
- Number: 7

Senior career*
Years	Team	Apps	(Gls)
	Mitrovica	0	(0)
2024–	Trabzon	26	(6)

International career^{‡}
2017–	Kosovo	66	(17)
- * Club domestic league appearances and goals as of 5 October 2025 ‡ National team caps and goals as of 9 June 2025 (UTC)

Kaltrina Biqkaj (born 5 August 2000) is a Kosovar footballer who plays as a forward for Mitrovica and the Kosovo women's national team.

== Club career ==
Biqkaj played in her country for Mitrovica, and captained the team. She won the Women's Football Superleague and the Kosova Women's Cup. She tookpart at the UEFA Women's Champions League in 2018–19 (three matches), 2019–20 (five matches, one goal), 2020–2 (one match) and 2021–22 (two matches).

Late August 2024, she moved to Turkey, and signed with Trabzonspor to play in the Super League.

== International career ==
Biqkaj has been capped for the Kosovo national team, appearing for the team during the 2019 FIFA Women's World Cup qualifying cycle.

== International goals ==
No.	Date	Venue	Opponent	Score	Result	Competition
1.	26 November 2017	Adem Jashari Olympic Stadium, Mitrovica, Kosovo	Montenegro	3–2	3–2	Friendly
2.	28 February 2019	Boyana National Football Center, Sofia, Bulgaria	Bulgaria	2–1	4–1	Friendly
3.	18 September 2020	Fadil Vokrri Stadium, Pristina, Kosovo	Estonia	1–0	2–0	UEFA Women's Euro 2022 qualifying
4.	18 September 2020	Fadil Vokrri Stadium, Pristina, Kosovo	Estonia	2–0	2–0	UEFA Women's Euro 2022 qualifying
5.	30 November 2021	Fadil Vokrri Stadium, Pristina, Kosovo	Albania	1–2	1–3	2023 FIFA Women's World Cup qualification
6.	18 February 2023	Gold City Sports Complex, Alanya, Turkey	Hong Kong	2–0	7–0	2023 Turkish Women's Cup
7.	18 February 2023	Gold City Sports Complex, Alanya, Turkey	Hong Kong	3–0	7–0	2023 Turkish Women's Cup
8.	13 July 2023	FFK National Camp Education, Hajvalia, Kosovo	Liechtenstein	3–0	4–0	Friendly
9.	31 October 2023	Fadil Vokkri Stadium, Pristina, Kosovo	North Macedonia	3–0	3–1	2023–24 UEFA Women's Nations League
10.	29 November 2024	Fadil Vokkri Stadium, Pristina, Kosovo	Estonia	1–0	8–0	Friendly
11.	21 February 2025	Petar Miloševski Training Centre, Skopje, North Macedonia	North Macedonia	1–0	4–0	2025 UEFA Women's Nations League
12.	21 February 2025	Petar Miloševski Training Centre, Skopje, North Macedonia	North Macedonia	2–0	4–0	2025 UEFA Women's Nations League
13.	8 April 2025	Fadil Vokkri Stadium, Pristina, Kosovo	North Macedonia	1–0	3–0	2025 UEFA Women's Nations League
14.	8 April 2025	Fadil Vokkri Stadium, Pristina, Kosovo	North Macedonia	2–0	3–0	2025 UEFA Women's Nations League
15.	1 July 2025	Kadriorg Stadium, Tallinn, Estonia	Estonia	1–1	2–2	Friendly
16.	3 March 2026	Fadil Vokrri Stadium, Pristina, Kosovo	Gibraltar	1–0	6–0	2027 FIFA Women's World Cup qualification
17.	9 June 2026	Europa Sports Park, Europa Point, Gibraltar	Gibraltar	3–0	8–0	2027 FIFA Women's World Cup qualification

== See also ==
- List of Kosovo women's international footballers
