= Kinga Kozak =

Polish footballer

Personal information
- Full name: Kinga Maria Kozak
- Date of birth: 15 October 2002 (age 24)
- Place of birth: Gostyń, Poland
- Height: 1.54 m (5 ft 1 in)
- Position: Attacking midfielder

Team information
- Current team: Napoli
- Number: 8

Youth career
- UKS Biskupianka Stara Krobia
- 2012–2018: Medyk Konin

Senior career*
Years	Team	Apps	(Gls)
2018–2021	GKS Katowice	59	(24)
2021–2022	Czarni Sosnowiec	22	(5)
2022–2024	Glasgow City	56	(15)
2024–2025	GKS Katowice	18	(10)
2025–	Napoli	21	(3)

International career^{‡}
2018–2019	Poland U17	8	(4)
2019–2020	Poland U19	8	(2)
2020–	Poland	17	(2)
- * Club domestic league appearances and goals as of 24 May 2026 ‡ National team caps and goals as of 21 November 2024

Kinga Maria Kozak (born 15 October 2002) is a Polish professional footballer who plays as an attacking midfielder for Serie A club Napoli and the Poland national team.

== Club career ==
Kozak was inspired to play football by watching her older brother Miłosz play. She came to notice playing for her primary school team UKS Biskupianka Stara Krobia, and was scouted by Medyk Konin. In 2017–18, she was the national top scorer for Medyk at under-16 level, but transferred to GKS Katowice that summer because she wanted to play at first team level in the Ekstraliga.

She was successful in three years at GKS Katowice, scoring 29 goals in 71 games across all competitions. In June 2021, she signed a one-year contract with the national champions Czarni Sosnowiec. With Czarni Sosnowiec, she won the Polish Cup and played in the 2021–22 UEFA Women's Champions League first round defeat by Ferencváros.

In June 2022, Kozak signed for Scottish Premier League club Glasgow City.

After two years abroad, on 22 August 2024 she returned to GKS Katowice on a one-year contract with an option for another year. In her first season back in Poland, she scored 10 goals in 18 Ekstraliga appearances, contributing to GKS' second title win.

On 9 July 2025, Kozak moved to Italian side Napoli.

== International career ==
Kozak made her senior international debut for Poland aged 18 years and eight days old in a 3–0 UEFA Women's Euro 2022 qualifying Group D win over Azerbaijan, played behind closed doors in Warsaw on 23 October 2020. She scored her first goal in Poland's 7–0 win over Kosovo in the final game of the 2023 FIFA Women's World Cup qualification – UEFA Group F series on 6 September 2022.

== Personal life ==
Kozak's older brother Miłosz is also a professional footballer. In 2022 she appeared on the Turbokozak reality television show, screened on Canal+ Premium.

== Career statistics ==
=== International ===
As of match played 12 July 2024

Appearances and goals by national team and year
National team	Year	Apps	Goals
Poland	2020	2	0
Poland	2021	4	0
Poland	2022	4	1
Poland	2023	6	1
Poland	2024	1	0
Total		17	2

Scores and results list Poland's goal tally first, score column indicates score after each Kozak goal.

List of international goals scored by Kinga Kozak
No.	Date	Venue	Opponent	Score	Result	Competition
1	6 September 2022	Arena Lublin, Lublin, Poland	Kosovo	7–0	7–0	2023 FIFA Women's World Cup qualification
2	5 December 2023	Zagłębiowski Park Sportowy, Sosnowiec, Poland	Greece	2–0	2–0	2023–24 UEFA Women's Nations League

== Honours ==
Czarni Sosnowiec

- Polish Cup: 2021–22

Glasgow City

- Scottish Women's Premier League: 2022–23

GKS Katowice

- Ekstraliga: 2024–25
