= Julie Blakstad =

Norwegian footballer (born 2001)

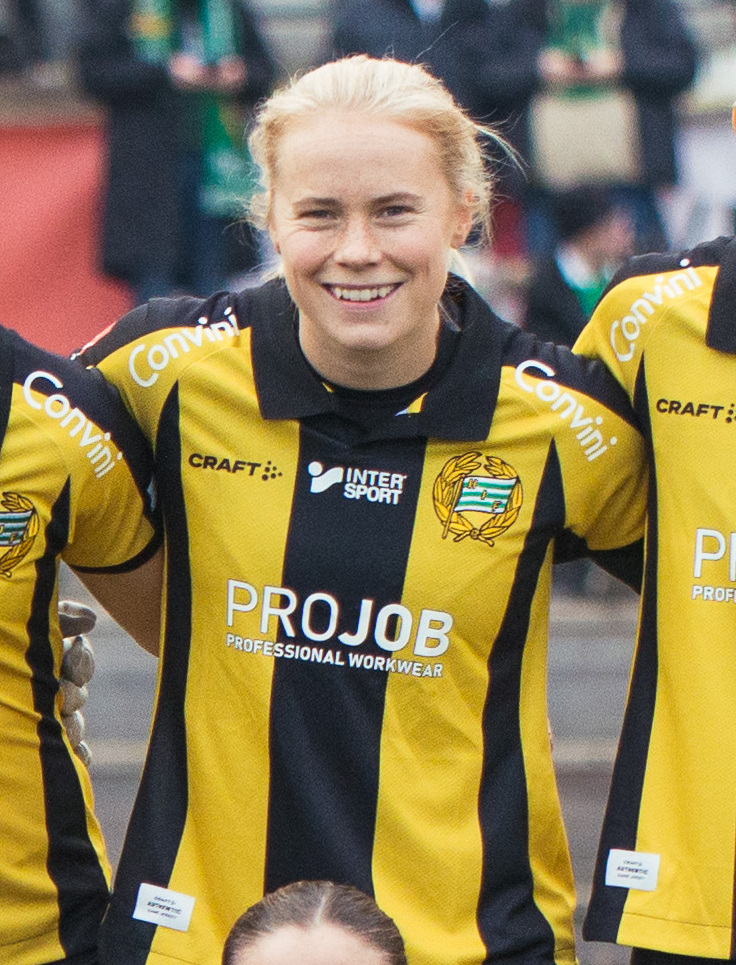
- Blakstad with Hammarby IF in 2025

Personal information
- Date of birth: 27 August 2001 (age 25)
- Place of birth: Norway
- Height: 1.70 m (5 ft 7 in)
- Positions: Left-back; left midfielder

Team information
- Current team: Tottenham Hotspur
- Number: 41

Youth career
- Ottestad

Senior career*
Years	Team	Apps	(Gls)
2018	Ottestad	9	(1)
2018–2019	FL Fart	33	(11)
2020–2022	Rosenborg	35	(17)
2022–2024	Manchester City	21	(3)
2023	→ BK Häcken (loan)	11	(1)
2024–2026	Hammarby IF	51	(23)
2026–	Tottenham Hotspur	12	(1)

International career^{‡}
2016	Norway U15	3	(0)
2017	Norway U16	13	(1)
2018	Norway U17	7	(1)
2018–2020	Norway U19	24	(6)
2019–	Norway U23	12	(5)
2020–	Norway	39	(5)
- * Club domestic league appearances and goals as of 07:56, 14 September 2026 (UTC) ‡ National team caps and goals as of 22:22, 14 October 2026 (UTC)

Julie Blakstad (born 27 August 2001) is a Norwegian professional footballer who plays as a left-back or left midfielder for Women's Super League club Tottenham Hotspur and the Norway national team.

== Club career ==
She is originally from Ottestad in Stange Municipality and started her senior career in Ottestad IL in the 3rd division.

=== FL Fart ===
In the summer of 2018, she went to FL Fart in the 1st division and was involved in the club moving up to the Toppserien that autumn. It was announced in September 2019 that she was ready for LSK Kvinner on loan. The Football Association received a complaint about the loan agreement from another club, and after looking at the transfer once more, it was cancelled. Blakstad thus completed the season in Fart and was voted Young Player of the Year in the Toppserien.

Blakstad trained with the English club, Chelsea, in preparation for the 2020 Season.

=== Rosenborg ===
In June 2020, the news came that she had signed for Rosenborg. She made her mark immediately and made history with a goal in the series premiere against LSK Kvinner, the first goal after Trondheims-Ørn became Rosenborg. It was a great season for both Blakstad and Rosenborg, who went undefeated through the season and took silver in the series. 19-year-old Blakstad was nominated for Player of the Year in Toppserien 2020. The nomination committee stated, "The super talent has impressed for several seasons... She is fearless, explosive, and has offensive qualities at international level. Going forward on the field, she is Rosenborg's most important player and has been involved in over a third of Trønder's goals this season."

In January 2021, she was picked on UEFA's list of ten footballers to watch out for in 2021. At the same time as she continued her big game in 2021. Football commentator Kasper Wikestad stated that she is perhaps the greatest talent he has seen live. During the season, she emerged as one of the Toppserien's best players and established herself on the senior Norway national team. She was again nominated as Player of the Year and won the Young Player of the Year award in Toppserien 2021.

=== Manchester City ===
In January 2022, Blakstad signed for the English Women's Super League club Manchester City in what was referred to as the biggest transfer from Norwegian football ever. Just days later, she made her debut in the 3-0 win over Tottenham in the semi-finals of the League Cup.

On 31 March 2023, Blakstad signed for the Damallsvenskan side BK Hacken on loan until mid-June 2023.

=== Hammarby IF ===
On 20 January 2024, Blakstad signed for the Champions of Damallsvenskan side Hammarby IF. Blakstad was presented on a contract expiring 31 December 2025.

=== Tottenham Hotspur ===
On 5 January 2026, Blakstad signed with Tottenham Hotspur in the English Women's Super League.

== International career ==
Blakstad has international matches for U15, U16, U17, U19, and the Norwegian national team.

In 2019 she was part of the under-19 squad that played the 2019 U19 European Championship. She played the three matches in her group but was eliminated when they were third place. In March 2020 she was also part of the under-19 team that participated in the La Manga tournament.

In September 2020, she was selected for the senior national team for the first time. The debut came on 27 October 2020 away to Wales, in the match where Norway secured a ticket to the European Championship in England 2022. On 16 September 2021 Blakstad scored her first international goal in the 10-0 win against Armenia as part of the 2023 World Cup qualification. In the 2022 Euro, she scored her team's first goal in the championship, in the opening match against Northern Ireland. In the first game after the European Championship, the deciding game to win the group in qualifying for the 2023 World Cup against Belgium, which was won 1-0, whereby the Norwegians qualified for the World Cup, Blakstad was in the starting lineup.

On 19 June 2023, she was included in the 23-player Norwegian squad for the FIFA Women's World Cup 2023.

== Career statistics ==
=== Club ===
As of match played 13 September 2026

Appearances and goals by club, season and competition
Club	Season	League			National cup (Note: Includes Women's FA Cup, Norwegian Women's Cup)		League cup (Note: Includes FA Women's League Cup)		Continental (Note: Includes UEFA Women's Champions League)		Total	
Club	Season	Division	Apps	Goals	Apps	Goals	Apps	Goals	Apps	Goals	Apps	Goals
Ottestad IL	2018	3. divisjon	4	4	0	0	—		—		4	4
FL Fart	2018	1. divisjon	11	7	0	0	—		—		11	7
FL Fart	2019	Toppserien	22	4	0	0	—		—		22	4
FL Fart	Total		33	11	0	0	0	0	0	0	33	11
Rosenborg	2020	Toppserien	20	7	2	0	—		—		22	7
Rosenborg	2021	Toppserien	20	13	3	0	—		2	2	25	15
Rosenborg	Total		40	20	5	0	0	0	2	2	47	22
Manchester City	2021–22	Women's Super League	8	1	3	0	2	0	—		13	1
Manchester City	2022–23	Women's Super League	9	2	2	4	5	3	0	0	16	9
Manchester City	2023–24	Women's Super League	4	0	0	0	3	0	—		7	0
Manchester City	Total		21	3	5	4	10	3	0	0	36	10
BK Hacken (loan)	2023	Damallsvenskan	11	1	1	0	—		—		12	1
Hammarby IF	2024	Damallsvenskan	25	8	4	4	—		8	3	37	15
Hammarby IF	2025	Damallsvenskan	26	15	5	2	—		6	3	37	20
Hammarby IF	2026	Damallsvenskan	0	0	1	1	—		—		1	1
Hammarby IF	Total		51	23	10	7	0	0	14	6	75	36
Tottenham Hotspur	2025–26	Women's Super League	10	1	3	0	0	0	—		13	1
Tottenham Hotspur	2026–27	Women's Super League	2	0	0	0	0	0	—		2	0
Tottenham Hotspur	Total		12	1	0	0	0	0	0	0	15	1
Career total			172	63	24	11	10	3	16	8	222	85

=== International ===
As of match played 13 October 2026

Appearances and goals by national team and year
National team	Year	Apps	Goals
Norway	2020	1	0
Norway	2021	10	2
Norway	2022	13	1
Norway	2023	6	0
Norway	2025	1	0
Norway	2026	8	2
Total		39	5

Scores and results list Norway's goal tally first, score column indicates score after each Blakstad goal.

List of international goals scored by Julie Blakstad
No.	Date	Venue	Opponent	Score	Result	Competition
1	16 September 2021	Ullevaal Stadion, Oslo, Norway	Armenia	5–0	10–0	2023 FIFA Women's World Cup qualification
2	21 September 2021	Fadil Vokrri Stadium, Pristina, Kosovo	Kosovo	2–0	3–0	2023 FIFA Women's World Cup qualification
3	7 July 2022	St Mary's Stadium, Southampton, England	Northern Ireland	1–0	4–1	UEFA Women's Euro 2022
4	14 April 2026	Åråsen Stadion, Lillestrøm, Norway	Slovenia	2–0	5–0	2027 FIFA Women's World Cup qualification
5	13 October 2026	Ullevaal Stadion, Oslo, Norway	Romania	6–0	6–0	2027 FIFA Women's World Cup play-offs

== Honours ==
Manchester City

- FA Women's League Cup: 2021–22

Individual

- Toppserien 2019: Breakthrough of the year
- Toppserien 2020: Nominated for Player of the Year
- Toppserien 2021: Young Player of the Year, nominated for Player of the Year
- UEFA 2021: 10 footballers to watch out for in 2021
