= Jehona Shala =

Kosovan footballer (born 2001)

Personal information
- Date of birth: 28 May 2001 (age 25)
- Place of birth: Kosovo
- Position: Striker

Team information
- Current team: Vllaznia

Senior career*
Years	Team	Apps	(Gls)
- Vllaznia

International career
	Kosovo	4	(3)
- * Club domestic league appearances and goals

Jehona Shala (born 28 May 2001) is a Kosovan footballer who plays as a striker for Vllaznia.

== Early life ==
Shala was born in 2001 in Kosovo. She started playing football at the age of ten.

== Career ==
Shala played for Kosovan side Liria. She was described as "one of the best [players] in Kosovo" while playing for the club.

== Personal life ==
Shala has regarded Brazil international Ronaldinho as her football idol. She is a native of Prizren, Ksoovo.
