= Erëleta Memeti =

Kosovan footballer

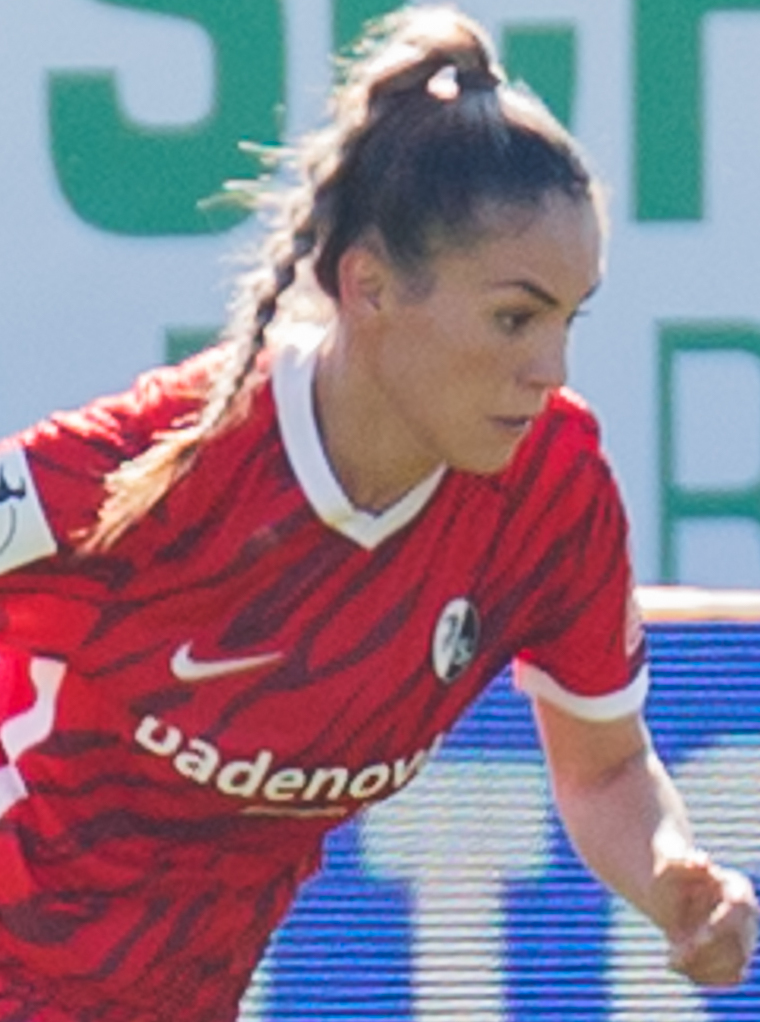
- Memeti with SC Freiburg in 2021

Personal information
- Date of birth: 30 June 1999 (age 27)
- Place of birth: Schwäbisch Hall, Germany
- Height: 1.61 m (5 ft 3 in)
- Position: Midfielder

Team information
- Current team: Eintracht Frankfurt
- Number: 7

Youth career
- SK Fichtenberg
- –2016: Spfr Schwäbisch Hall

Senior career*
Years	Team	Apps	(Gls)
2016–2017	VfL Sindelfingen	18	(6)
2017–2020	VfL Wolfsburg II	53	(13)
2020–2022	SC Freiburg	40	(7)
2022–2025	TSG Hoffenheim	63	(17)
2025–	Eintracht Frankfurt	35	(6)

International career^{‡}
2017	Germany U19	2	(1)
2018	Germany U20	3	(0)
2019–	Kosovo	65	(26)
- * Club domestic league appearances and goals as of 21 November 2026 ‡ National team caps and goals as of 14 October 2026 (UTC)

Erëleta Memeti (born 30 June 1999) is a professional footballer who plays as a midfielder for Frauen-Bundesliga club Eintracht Frankfurt. Born in Germany, she captains the Kosovo national team.

== Career ==
Memeti received her first call-up to the national team in 2019, and has also appeared for the team during the UEFA Women's Euro 2021 qualifying cycle.

== Career statistics ==
=== Club ===
As of 21 November 2026

Appearances and goals by club, season and competition
Club	Season	League			DFB-Pokal		Europe		Total	
Club	Season	Division	Apps	Goals	Apps	Goals	Apps	Goals	Apps	Goals
VfL Sindelfingen	2016–17	2. Bundesliga Süd	18	6					18	6
VfL Wolfsburg II	2017–18	2. Bundesliga Nord	12	2					12	2
VfL Wolfsburg II	2018–19	2. Bundesliga	25	6					25	6
VfL Wolfsburg II	2019–20	2. Bundesliga	16	4					16	4
VfL Wolfsburg II	Total		53	12					53	12
SC Freiburg II	2020–21	Regionaliga Südwest	1	0					1	0
SC Freiburg	2020–21	Frauen-Bundesliga	19	1	4	2			23	3
SC Freiburg	2021–22	Frauen-Bundesliga	21	6	2	0			23	6
SC Freiburg	Total		40	7	6	2			46	9
TSG Hoffenheim	2022–23	Frauen-Bundesliga	22	8	3	4			25	12
TSG Hoffenheim	2023–24	Frauen-Bundesliga	21	3	3	1			24	4
TSG Hoffenheim	2024–25	Frauen-Bundesliga	20	6	4	3			24	9
TSG Hoffenheim	Total		63	17	10	8			73	25
Eintracht Frankfurt	2025–26	Frauen-Bundesliga	24	5	2	1	10 (Note: Two appearances in UEFA Women's Champions League, eight appearances and one goal in UEFA Women's Europa Cup)	1	36	7
Eintracht Frankfurt	2026–27	Frauen-Bundesliga	11	1	1	0	8	0 (Note: Four appearances in UEFA Women's Champions League, Four appearances in UEFA Women's Europa Cup)	20	1
Eintracht Frankfurt	Total		35	6	3	1	18	1	56	8
Career total			210	48	19	11	18	1	247	60

=== International ===
Scores and results list Kosovo's goal tally first, score column indicates score after each Memeti goal.

List of international goals scored by Erëleta Memeti
No.	Date	Venue	Opponent	Score	Result	Competition
1	8 April 2019	Fadil Vokrri Stadium, Pristina, Kosovo	North Macedonia	3–3	3–3	Friendly
2	9 November 2019	Terrain ZAC Klengbousbierg, Bissen, Luxembourg	Luxembourg		5–0	Friendly
3	9 November 2019	Terrain ZAC Klengbousbierg, Bissen, Luxembourg	Luxembourg		5–0	Friendly
4	7 April 2022	Sandefjord Arena, Sandefjord, Norway	Norway	1–3	1–5	2023 FIFA Women's World Cup qualification
5	12 April 2022	Fadil Vokrri Stadium, Pristina, Kosovo	Belgium	1–5	1–6	2023 FIFA Women's World Cup qualification
6	27 June 2022	Fadil Vokrri Stadium, Pristina, Kosovo	North Macedonia	2–0	4–0	Friendly
7	27 June 2022	Fadil Vokrri Stadium, Pristina, Kosovo	North Macedonia	3–0	4–0	Friendly
8	12 November 2022	Bonifika Stadium, Koper, Slovenia	Slovenia	1–0	1–3	Friendly
9	15 February 2023	Gold City Sports Complex, Alanya, Turkey	Estonia	2–1	2–1	2023 Turkish Women's Cup
10	21 February 2023	Gold City Sports Complex, Alanya, Turkey	Bulgaria	1–0	1–1	2023 Turkish Women's Cup
11	10 April 2023	Boyana Sports Complex, Sofia, Bulgaria	Bulgaria	1–0	1–0	Friendly
12	13 July 2023	FFK National Education Camp, Hajvalia, Kosovo	Liechtenstein	1–0	4–0	Friendly
13	31 October 2023	Fadil Vokkri Stadium, Pristina, Kosovo	North Macedonia	2–0	3–1	2023–24 UEFA Women's Nations League
14	27 February 2024	Gold City Sport Complex, Alanya, Turkey	India	1–0	1–0	2024 Turkish Women's Cup
15	29 November 2024	Fadil Vokkri Stadium, Pristina, Kosovo	Estonia	2–0	8–0	Friendly
16	29 November 2024	Fadil Vokkri Stadium, Pristina, Kosovo	Estonia	3–0	8–0	Friendly
17	29 November 2024	Fadil Vokkri Stadium, Pristina, Kosovo	Estonia	5–0	8–0	Friendly
18	8 April 2025	Fadil Vokkri Stadium, Pristina, Kosovo	North Macedonia	3–0	3–0	2025 UEFA Women's Nations League
19	3 June 2025	LNK Sporta Parks, Riga, Latvia	Latvia	2–1	2–2	2025 UEFA Women's Nations League
20	1 July 2025	Kadriorg Stadium, Tallinn, Estonia	Estonia	2–1	2–2	Friendly
21	3 March 2026	Fadil Vokkri Stadium, Pristina, Kosovo	Gibraltar	4–0	6–0	2027 FIFA Women's World Cup qualification
22	14 April 2026	Stadion Aleksandar Shalamanov, Sofia, Bulgaria	Bulgaria	1–1	3–1	2027 FIFA Women's World Cup qualification
23	18 April 2026	Fadil Vokkri Stadium, Pristina, Kosovo	Bulgaria	2–1	2–1	2027 FIFA Women's World Cup qualification
24	9 June 2026	Europa Sports Park, Europa Point, Gibraltar	Gibraltar	2–0	8–0	2027 FIFA Women's World Cup qualification
25	9 June 2026	Europa Sports Park, Europa Point, Gibraltar	Gibraltar	4–0	8–0	2027 FIFA Women's World Cup qualification
26	9 October 2026	Fadil Vokkri Stadium, Pristina, Kosovo	Austria	1–0	1–2	2027 FIFA Women's World Cup qualification

== See also ==
- List of Kosovo women's international footballers
