= Nikola Karczewska =

Polish footballer (born 1999)

Personal information
- Date of birth: 16 October 1999 (age 27)
- Place of birth: Zielonka, Poland
- Height: 1.83 m (6 ft 0 in)
- Position: Forward

Team information
- Current team: Hamburger SV
- Number: 20

Senior career*
Years	Team	Apps	(Gls)
2015–2019	UKS SMS Łódź		
2019–2021	Górnik Łęczna	34	(36)
2021–2022	FC Fleury 91	21	(10)
2022–2024	Tottenham Hotspur	14	(2)
2023–2024	→ Bayer Leverkusen (loan)	20	(10)
2024–2025	AC Milan	20	(4)
2025–2026	Lazio	19	(4)
2026–	Hamburger SV	9	(4)

International career^{‡}
2017–2018	Poland U19	3	(1)
2019–	Poland	24	(8)
- * Club domestic league appearances and goals as of 21:30, 21 November 2026 (UTC) ‡ National team caps and goals as of 12:15, 21 November 2024 (UTC)

Nikola Karczewska (born 16 October 1999) is a Polish professional footballer who plays as a forward for Frauen-Bundesliga club Hamburger SV.

== Club career ==
=== UKS SMS Łódź ===
Karczewska begun her career with Polish second division side UKS SMS Łódź. At the end of the 2016–17 season, she helped the club to gain promotion to the Polish top flight Ekstraliga.

=== Górnik Łęczna ===
In 2019, Karczewska signed with Ekstraliga side Górnik Łęczna. During her first season with the club, she helped the club to achieve a league and cup double by winning both the Ekstraliga and Polish Women's Cup as well as achieving qualification to the UEFA Women's Champions League.

=== FC Fleury 91 ===
In June 2021, Karczewska signed with Division 1 Féminine side FC Fleury 91. She scored her first goal for the club in a 1–0 win over ASJ Soyaux-Charente on 25 September 2021. She scored her first hat-trick for the club in a 4-2 league win over AS Saint-Étienne. In her lone season with the club, she made 24 appearances and netted 10 goals for the club. She ended the season as the club's top scorer and help them to their highest league position to date by finishing 4th in the league.

=== Tottenham Hotspur ===
In July 2022, Karczewska signed with Women Super League side Tottenham Hotspur. On 24 September 2022, she made her club debut in a 4–0 loss against Arsenal in a league match. She scored her first goal for the club in a FA WSL Cup win against Reading on 2 October 2022.

==== Loan to Bayer Leverkusen ====
On 5 September 2023, Karczewska joined Bayer Leverkusen on a season-long loan.

=== AC Milan ===
After a good spell in Germany, on 28 June 2024 she joined Serie A club AC Milan on a permanent deal.

=== Lazio ===
On 9 July 2025, Karczewska moved to fellow Serie A side Lazio.

=== Hamburger SV ===
On 17 July 2026, Karczewska returned to Germany and signed with Hamburger SV.

== International career ==
Karczewska has represented Poland in their U19 women's national team before making her first appearance for the Polish women's national team in a 1–0 loss to Slovakia on 14 June 2019. She scored her first goal for her country on 7 April 2022 against Armenia. She went on to score a total of 6 goals in the same match.

== Career statistics ==
=== Club ===
As of match played 21 November 2026

Appearances and goals by club, season and competition
Club	Season	League			National cup (Note: Includes Polish Cup, Women's FA Cup, Coupe de France Féminine, DFB-Pokal, Coppa Italia)		League cup (Note: Includes FA Women's League Cup)		Continental		Total	
Club	Season	Division	Apps	Goals	Apps	Goals	Apps	Goals	Apps	Goals	Apps	Goals
Górnik Łęczna	2019–20	Ekstraliga	12	13	4	1	—		3 (Note: Appearances in UEFA Women's Champions League)	3	19	17
Górnik Łęczna	2020–21	Ekstraliga	22	23	4	3	—		4	1	30	27
Górnik Łęczna	Total		34	36	8	4	—		7	4	49	44
FC Fleury 91	2021–22	D1 Féminine	21	10	3	0	—		—		24	10
Tottenham Hotspur	2022–23	WSL	14	2	2	0	3	2	—		19	4
Bayer Leverkusen (loan)	2023–24	Frauen-Bundesliga	20	10	3	3	—		—		23	13
AC Milan	2024–25	Serie A	20	4	1	0	—		—		21	4
Lazio	2025–26	Serie A	19	4	1	0	—		2 (Note: Appearances in Serie A Women's Cup)	1	22	5
Hamburger SV	2026–27	Frauen-Bundesliga	9	4	1	0	—		—		10	4
Career total			137	70	19	7	3	2	9	5	168	84

=== International ===
As of match played 31 May 2024

Appearances and goals by national team and year
National team	Year	Apps	Goals
Poland	2019	3	0
Poland	2020	1	0
Poland	2021	7	0
Poland	2022	9	8
Poland	2023	1	0
Poland	2024	3	0
Total		24	8

Scores and results list Poland's goal tally first, score column indicates score after each Karczewska goal.

List of international goals scored by Nikola Karczewska
No.	Date	Venue	Opponent	Score	Result	Competition
1	7 April 2022	Stadion Miejski, Gdynia, Poland	Armenia	1–0	12–0	2023 FIFA Women's World Cup qualification
2	7 April 2022	Stadion Miejski, Gdynia, Poland	Armenia	3–0	12–0	2023 FIFA Women's World Cup qualification
3	7 April 2022	Stadion Miejski, Gdynia, Poland	Armenia	4–0	12–0	2023 FIFA Women's World Cup qualification
4	7 April 2022	Stadion Miejski, Gdynia, Poland	Armenia	7–0	12–0	2023 FIFA Women's World Cup qualification
5	7 April 2022	Stadion Miejski, Gdynia, Poland	Armenia	8–0	12–0	2023 FIFA Women's World Cup qualification
6	7 April 2022	Stadion Miejski, Gdynia, Poland	Armenia	12–0	12–0	2023 FIFA Women's World Cup qualification
7	12 April 2022	Ullevaal Stadion, Oslo, Norway	Norway	1–2	1–2	2023 FIFA Women's World Cup qualification
8	6 October 2022	Estadio Municipal de Chapín, Jerez de la Frontera, Spain	Morocco	4–0	4–0	Friendly

== Honours ==
Górnik Łęczna

- Ekstraliga: 2019–20
- Polish Cup: 2019–20
