= Gamze Durmuş =

Turkish football referee and acaďemic

- Full name: Gamze Durmuş Pakkan
- Born: 1994 (age 31–32); Turkey
- Other occupation: Academic

Domestic
Years	League	Role
2014–2022	Boys' U14, U15, U16, U17, U19 Regional Development	referee
2015–2020	Women's Second	referee
2016–2021	Men's Regional Amateur	referee
2017–2020	Women's Third	referee
2017–2019	Men's U21	referee
2018–2022	Men's Third	referee
2019–	Women's First	referee
2021–	Women's Super	referee
2022–	Men's Second	referee
2022–	Men's First	referee

International
Years	League	Role
2021	FIFA Women's World Cup qualification	referee
2021–2022	UEFA Women's U17 Championship qualification	referee
2023	UEFA Women's U19 Championship qualification	referee

Gamze Durmuş Pakkan (née Durmuş; 1994) is a Turkish female FIFA-listed football referee. She is an academic at Gazi University in Ankara, Turkey.

== Sports career ==
=== Domestic competitions ===
Durmuş was born in 1993, and started her football official career as assistant referee in a Turkish Women's Football Third League match played in Ankara on 7 December 2014. İn 2015, she was promoted to referee, and officiated the Turkish Women's Football Second League match on 20 December between Fomget GSK and Ovacık GSK. On 1 October 2016, she served for the first time as fourth official in the Turkish Men's Football U21 League match between Kardemir Karabükspor and Trabzonspor. On 23 October the same year, she officiated her first Turkish Regional Amateur League match.

On 10 March 2017, she debuted as referee in a TFF Third League (Professional) match. Her first Turkish Women's Football First League match as referee took place between Fomget GSK and Kireçburnu Spor on 22 December 2019. She was promoted to a video assistant referee (VAR) position in the Turkish Men's Football Super League match between Galatasaray S.K. and Fatih Karagümrük S.K. on 2 April 2022.

On 23 October 2022, she served the first time as referee in the TFF Second League (Professional) match between Bucaspor 1928 and Balıkesirspor. On 11 March 2023, she debuted as fourth official in a Turkish Men's Super League match. As of 1 October 2023, she has served in various official roles in a total of 163 matches at different level domestic men's and women's competitions.

Gamze Durmuş and her husband Burak Pakkan were appointed to officiate the 2021–22 TFF First League derby match in Ankara on 12 September 2021 between MKE Ankaragücü and Gençlerbirliği S.K. While Burak administered the match, she served as the fourth official. That a married referee couple were together in charge in an official league match happened for the first time in the history of Turkish football.

=== International competitions ===
Nominated by the Turkish Referee's Central Committee (Turkish: Merkez Hakem Kurulu, MHK), she was confirmed as a FIFA-listed football referee in December 2020.

In November 2021, she officiated one match at the 2023 FIFA Women's World Cup qualification – UEFA Group E. In September 2021 and March 2022, she administered four matches at the 2022 UEFA Women's Under-17 Championship qualification – League B, Group B1. In October 2023, she served in two matches at the 2024 UEFA Women's Under-19 Championship qualification.

== Personal life ==
Durmuş lives in Ankara, Turkey. On 20 June 2021, she married in Ankara to Burak Pakkan, who is also a football referee.

Durmuş holds a PhD title in Sport management from the Faculty of Sports at Gazi University in Ankara, and is a faculty member at the same university.
