= Modesta Uka =

Kosovar footballer

Personal information
- Date of birth: 23 May 1999 (age 27)
- Place of birth: Stublla e Epërme
- Position: Forward

Team information
- Current team: FK Austria Wien
- Number: 22

Youth career
- 2014–2018: Sturm Graz

Senior career*
Years	Team	Apps	(Gls)
2014	Sturm Graz II	1	(0)
2018–2025	Sturm Graz	62	(16)
2025–	FK Austria Wien	0	(0)

International career^{‡}
2019–	Kosovo	12	(5)
- * Club domestic league appearances and goals as of 29 May 2024 ‡ National team caps and goals as of 1 December 2020

Modesta Uka (born 23 May 1999) is a Kosovan footballer who plays as a forward for Austrian ÖFB-Frauenliga club FK Austria Wien and the Kosovo women's national team.

== Career ==
Uka was first capped for the Kosovo national team in 2019. She has also appeared for the team during the UEFA Women's Euro 2021 qualifying cycle.

Uka scored the fastest goal in ÖFB Frauen Bundesliga history in a match against Blau-Wieß linz on 1 November 2026.

== Honours ==
- ÖFB Frauen-Bundesliga 2025/26
- ÖFB Frauen Cup 2025/26

== See also ==
- List of Kosovo women's international footballers
