= Zahir Pajaziti Stadium =

Football stadium in Podujevë, Kosovo

- Stadiumi Zahir Pajaziti (Albanian)
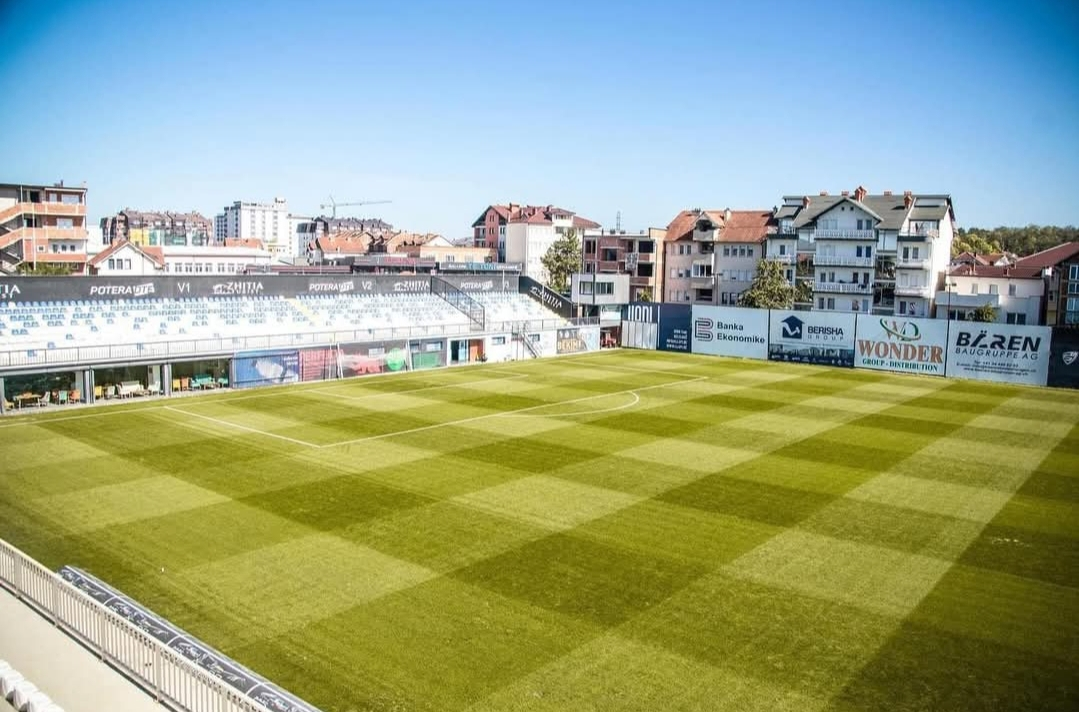
- UEFA
- Interactive map of Zahir Pajaziti Stadium
- Location: Podujevë, Kosovo
- Coordinates: 42.905073°N 21.19489°E
- Owner: Municipality of Podujevë
- Operator: KF Llapi
- Capacity: 3,500
- Surface: Grass
- Scoreboard: LED
- Field size: 105 by 68 metres (114.8 yd × 74.4 yd)

Construction
- Built: 2012-2014
- Opened: 2014
- Renovated: 2015-2016,2017-2018,2021
- Cost: €1,622,000 (2012-2014) , €1,000,000 (2021)

Tenant
- KF Llapi

Zahir Pajaziti Stadium (Albanian: Stadiumi Zahir Pajaziti) is a football stadium in Podujevë, Kosovo. It is currently used for football matches by KF Llapi in the Kosovo Superleague. The stadium holds about 3,000 people. The stadium is named after Zahir Pajaziti, the Kosovo Liberation Army founder and commander.
