= Blerta Smaili =

Kosovan footballer

Personal information
- Date of birth: 8 May 2002 (age 24)
- Place of birth: Reutlingen, Germany
- Height: 1.70 m (5 ft 7 in)
- Position: Midfielder

Team information
- Current team: ABB Fomget
- Number: 5

Youth career
- –2018: VfL Sindelfingen

Senior career*
Years	Team	Apps	(Gls)
2018–2021	VfL Sindelfingen	21	(4)
2021–2022	VfB Obertürkheim	16	(1)
2023–2024	Sundsvalls	26	(1)
2024	Basel	0	(0)
2024-2025	Clube de Albergaria		
2025-	ABB Fomget	2	(0)

International career^{‡}
2018	Germany U17	1	(0)
2020–	Kosovo	17	(0)
- * Club domestic league appearances and goals as of 15 October 2025 ‡ National team caps and goals as of 19 January 2024

Blerta Smaili (born 8 May 2002) is a women's association football midfielder who plays in the Turkish Super League for ABB Fomget.Born in Germany, she plays for the Kosovo national team. She has previously also represented Germany at under-17 international level.

== Club career ==
Smaili started her football career at Sindelfingen in Germany, where she has also the German citizenship. She then transferred to another German club Obertürkheim in Stuttgart. In 2023, she went to Sweden, and joined Sundsvalls. After one season, she transferred to the Swiss club Basel in January 2024 to play until the end of the season.

The next season, she played in Portugal for Albergari.

Mid July 2025, she noved to Turkey, and signed with the Super League club ABB Fomget.

== International career ==
Smaili is a member of Kosovo national team. She took part at the 2025 UEFA Women's Nations League promotion/relegation matches in October 2025.

== See also ==
- List of Kosovo women's international footballers
