= Valentina Metaj =

Kosovan footballer (born 2004)

Personal information
- Date of birth: 3 October 2004 (age 22)
- Place of birth: Sweden
- Positions: Forward; attacking midfielder

Team information
- Current team: Göteborg
- Number: 20

Youth career
- 2014–2022: Kristianstads DFF

Senior career*
Years	Team	Apps	(Gls)
2022–2023	Ifö Bromölla	41	(4)
2023	Elpides Karditsas	9	(1)
2024	IFK Kalmar	26	(1)
2026–	IFK Göteborg	7	(1)

International career^{‡}
2022–	Kosovo	25	(8)
- * Club domestic league appearances and goals as of 16 June 2026 ‡ National team caps and goals as of 16 June 2026

Valentina Metaj (born 3 October 2004) is a footballer who plays as an attacking midfielder for Elitettan club IFK Göteborg. Born in Sweden, she plays for the Kosovo national team.

== Early life ==
Metaj started playing football at the age of ten.

== Career ==
Metaj plays for the Kosovo women's national football team.
