= Hajvalia =

Hajvalia: Ајвалија/Ajvalija (Serbian)
- Location in Kosovo
- Coordinates: 42°37′N 21°11′E
- Country: Kosovo
- District: Pristina
- Municipality: Pristina
- Elevation: 635 m (2,083 ft)

Population (2024)
  - Total: 7,702
- Time zone: UTC+1 (CET)
  - Summer (DST): UTC+2 (CEST)
- Postal code: 10000
- Area code: 0381 (0)38

Hajvalia (Serbian Cyrillic: Ајвалија) is a village in the municipality of Pristina, Kosovo. It has a population of 7,702 inhabitants. A small creek begins in the town, while another begins north-east of the town and runs through it. After 1970, there has been an increase in population, due to the proximity with Prishtinë.

The road here passes through Gjilan and Prishtinë and connects with M25.2 way.

== Demographics ==
Historical population of Hajvalia
Year	1948	1953	1961	1971	1981	1991	2011	2024
Pop.	436	757	1,192	1,696	3,027	3,962	7,391	7,702
±%	—	+73.6%	+57.5%	+42.3%	+78.5%	+30.9%	+86.5%	+4.2%

== Places of interest ==
There is a zinc and silver mine, which opened in 1953 and have been completely renovated, namely the Trepča Mines-Pristina (Hajvalia). A public park is located near the town-centre, along the Dëshmorët e Gollakut (Lit. Gollak Martyrs road). There is a mosque, Xhamia e Hajvalisë (Lit. Mosque of Hajvalia), in the south-west of the village.

== Sport ==
The local football club was KF Hajvalia. KF Prishtina e Re, who as of the 2025/26 season are playing in the Football Superleague of Kosovo, are also located in Hajvalia. They play their games in the FFK National Education Camp.

== Education ==
There are two primary schools in Hajvalia. The most recent, "Afrim Gashi", was opened roughly 11 years ago, named after the martyr who was an inhabitant of Hajvalia. The other primary school is "Shkëndija" (Lit. "Spark").

== Other ==
Behgjet Pacolli AKR chairman and former president of Kosovo is a resident. In Hajvalija there is the International Village. After the war it saw development of small businesses and private businesses.

A Swedish KFOR military camp, Camp Victoria, was located in Hajvalia. Most of the Swedish soldiers in the Kosovo Force in Kosovo were located at Camp Victoria. The camp was previously named Camp Gripen, but the name was changed in spring 2000. It was named for Victoria, Crown Princess of Sweden.

Most of the soldiers were Swedish, but there were also Irish, Czech, Finnish and Latvian soldiers. In June 2004, the total number of personnel was about 450 persons, out of which 329 came from Sweden, while the camp housed 700 soldiers in 2002.

Most of the soldiers belonged to the Swedish mechanized rifle company and the Swedish supply company. In June 2011, Camp Victoria was to be completely discontinued and KS21 was the last Swedish contingent that was operational at the camp before KS22 moved into the KFOR headquarters at Camp Film City.
