= Kosovo women's national football team =

Kosovo
- Nickname: Dardanet (Dardanets)
- Association: Federata e Futbollit e Kosovës (FFK)
- Confederation: UEFA (Europe)
- Head coach: Sami Sermaxhaj
- Captain: Erëleta Memeti
- Most caps: Kaltrina Biqkaj (55) (Note: There may be more matches or goals because some match data is missing.)
- Top scorer: Erëleta Memeti (13)
- Home stadium: Fadil Vokrri Stadium
- FIFA code: KOS
First colours	Second colours	Third colours

FIFA ranking
- Current: 83 ▲2 (20 October 2026)
- Highest: 91 (March 2024)
- Lowest: 126 (July – September 2019)

First international
- Albania 2–2 Kosovo (Durrës, Albania; 19 September 2015)

Biggest win
- Kosovo 8–0 Estonia (Pristina, Kosovo; 29 November 2024); Gibraltar 0–8 Kosovo (Europa Point, Gibraltar; 9 June 2026)

Biggest defeat
- Belgium 7–0 Kosovo (Leuven, Belgium; 21 October 2021); Poland 7–0 Kosovo (Lublin, Poland; 6 September 2022)

The Kosovo women's national football team (Albanian: Kombëtarja e futbollit të femrave të Kosovës; Serbian: Женска фудбалска репрезентација Косова, romanized: Ženska fudbalska reprezentacija Kosova) represents Kosovo in international women's football and is controlled by the Football Federation of Kosovo.

== History ==
=== Permitting by FIFA to play friendlies ===
On 6 February 2013, FIFA gave Kosovo the permission to play international friendly games against other member associations. On 13 January 2014, there was a change of this permit that forbade Kosovo to play against the national teams of the countries of the former Yugoslavia. Club teams were also allowed to play friendlies and this happened after a FIFA Emergency Committee meeting. However, it was stipulated that clubs and representative teams of the Football Federation of Kosovo may not display national symbols as flags, emblems, etc. or play national anthems. The go-ahead was given after meetings between the Football Association of Serbia and Sepp Blatter.

=== Membership in UEFA and FIFA ===
In September 2015 at an UEFA Executive Committee meeting in Malta was approved the request from the federation to the admission in UEFA to the next Ordinary Congress to be held in Budapest. On 3 May 2016, at the Ordinary Congress. Kosovo were accepted into UEFA after members voted 28–24 in favor of Kosovo. Ten days later, Kosovo was accepted in FIFA during their 66th congress in Mexico with 141 votes in favour and 23 against.

=== First tournament ===
==== Debut in World Cup and Euro qualifications ====
Kosovo began to make their debut in the 2019 FIFA Women's World Cup qualification, where Kosovo was drawn with Albania, Greece and Malta. The Kosovars despite the efforts failed to qualify and finished last in the group with three losses.

After failing to qualify for the 2019 FIFA Women's World Cup, Kosovo participated in the UEFA Women's Euro 2021 qualifying, together with Estonia, Russia, Slovenia, Turkey and 2019 World Cup runners-up finisher Netherlands, the Kosovars created their first big surprise, defeating Turkey in a 2–0 home win, which was also the team's first-ever competitive win, victory which increased the enthusiasm which unfortunately did not last long and after the positive results began to experience a decline which resulted in disqualification.

== Team image ==
=== Nicknames ===
The Kosovo women's national football team has been known by the nickname "Dardanet (Dardanets)". Prior to 2016, the team was also sometimes referred to as "Shqipëria B" ("Albania B") due to the exchange of players between the national teams of Kosovo and Albania, which led to informal references to both teams as reserve (B) sides of one another. Kosovo received this nickname because several players joined the team after limited opportunities with Albania, while the Albanian national team was occasionally described as "Kosovo B" because of the significant presence of players of Kosovo Albanian descent in its squad.

=== Kits and crest ===
The Kosovo women's national football team wears blue jerseys for home matches, white jerseys for away matches, and black jerseys for neutral venues; the black kit is primarily used as an alternative kit, following the tradition of the Kosovo men's team.

On 5 October 2016, Kosovo signed a four-year contract with the Spanish sportswear company Kelme, becoming the first official kit supplier of Kosovo following the country's membership in UEFA and FIFA. On 5 February 2026, Kosovo signed a two-year contract with the German sportswear company Adidas, making it the national team's current kit supplier.

==== Kit sponsorship ====
Kit supplier	Period	Contract	
Kit supplier	Period	Announcement	Duration
Kelme	2016–2018	5 October 2016	2016–2020 (4 years)
Fourteen	2018–2022	16 June 2018	2018–2022 (4 years)
Erreà	2023–2026	23 February 2023	2023–2026 (3 years)
Adidas	2026–present	5 February 2026	2026–2028 (2 years)

=== Home stadium ===
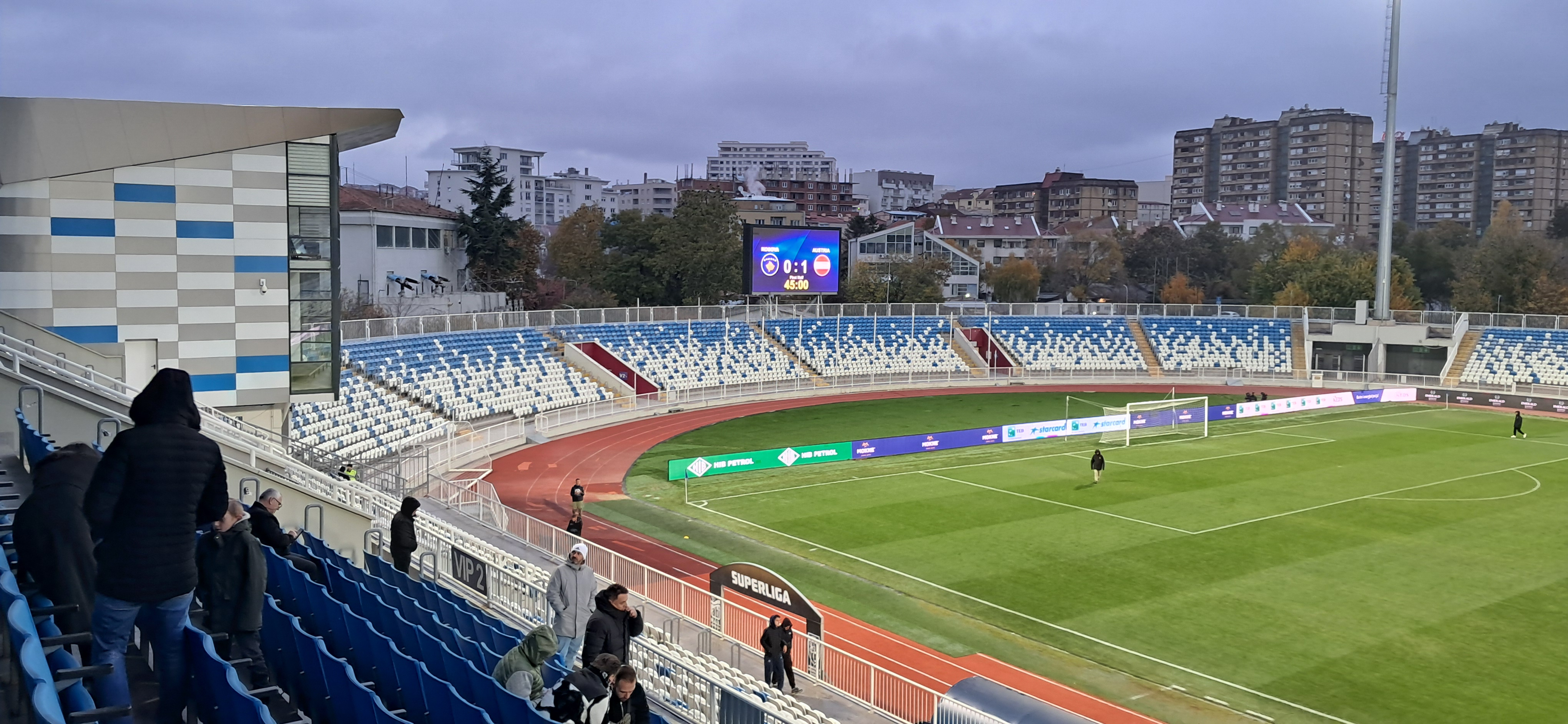
Fadil Vokrri Stadium

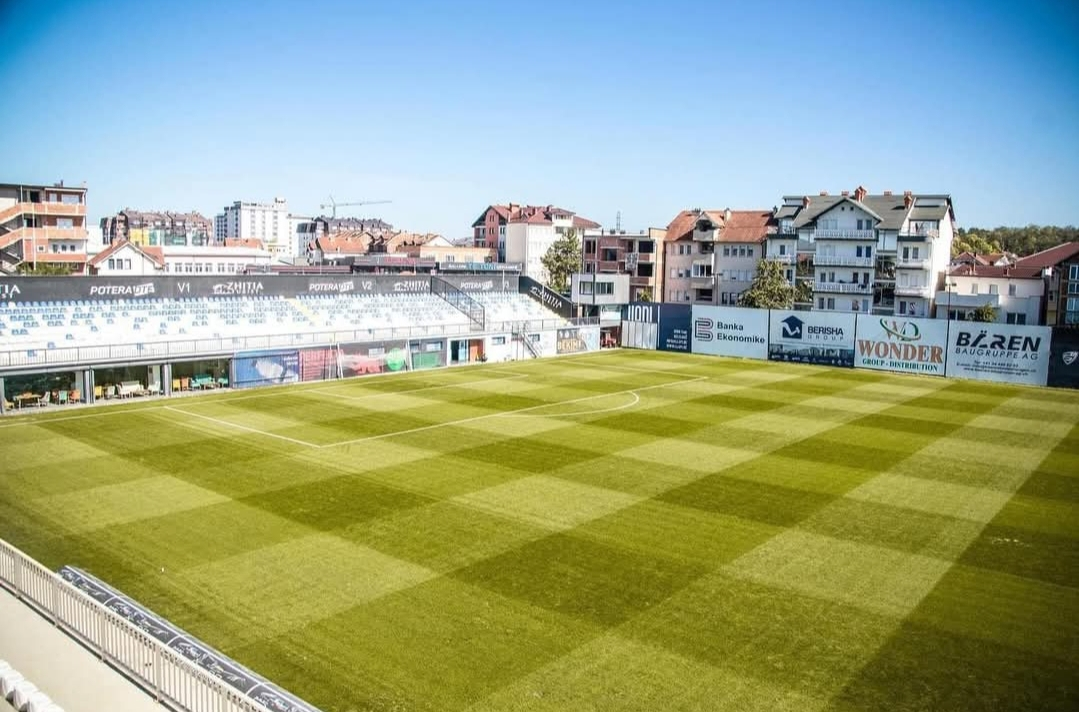
Zahir Pajaziti Stadium

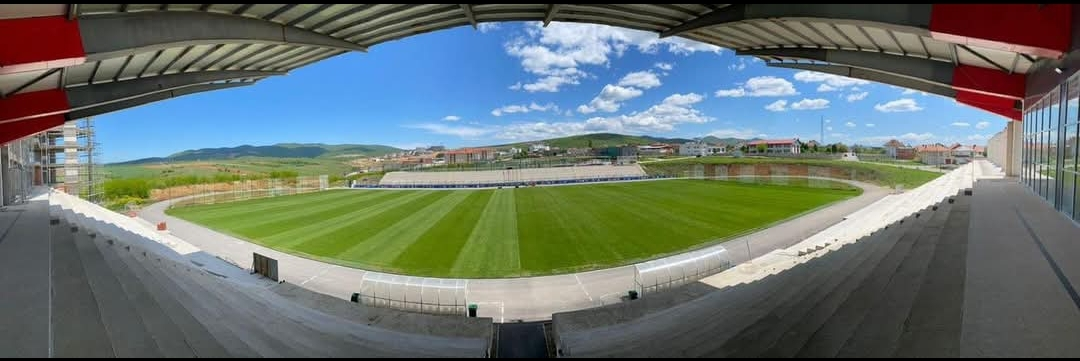
FFK National Educational Camp

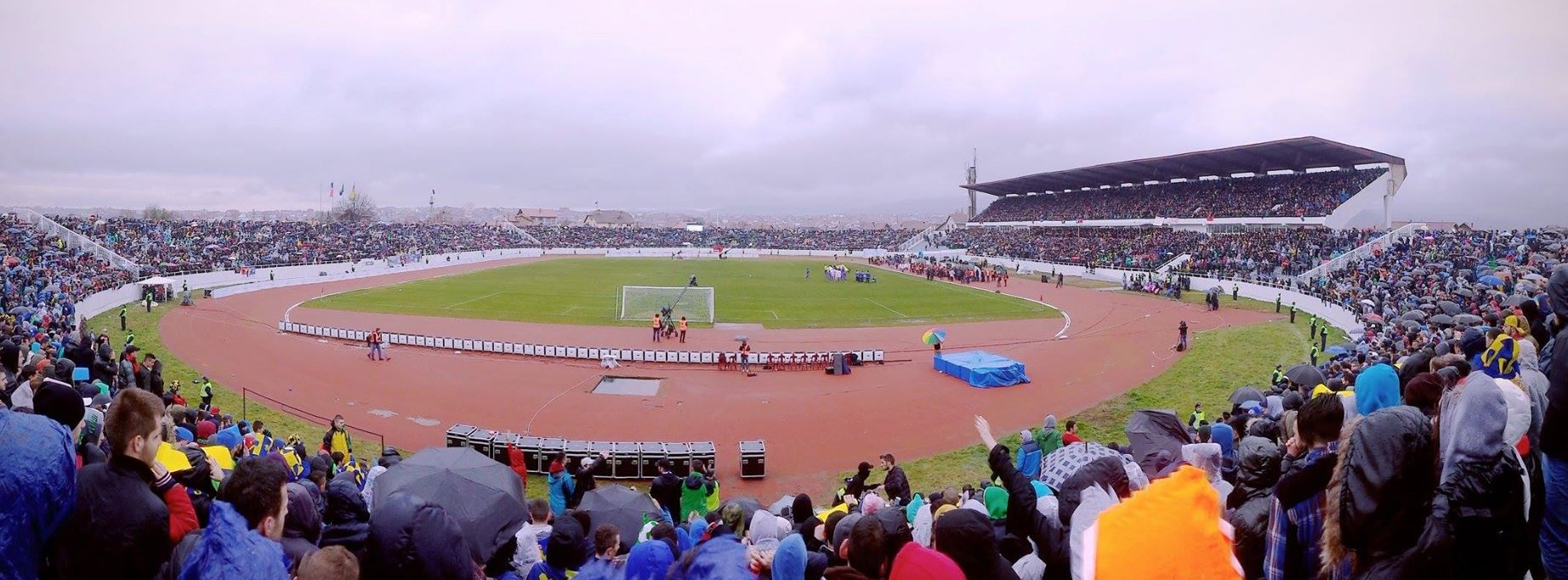
Adem Jashari Olympic Stadium

Kosovo's home stadium is the Fadil Vokrri Stadium, which has a capacity of 13,500 and is the second-largest national stadium in the country. The previous national stadium was the Adem Jashari Olympic Stadium, which is currently undergoing renovation. While matches are primarily played at the Fadil Vokrri Stadium, alternative venues have been used for specific purposes. The FFK National Educational Camp and Gjakova City Stadium have mainly hosted friendly matches despite not meeting UEFA stadium category requirements, while the Zahir Pajaziti Stadium was used during the period when the Fadil Vokrri Stadium underwent surface renovation.

On 12 July 2019, the construction of Kosovo National Stadium began, and two days later the project of this stadium was presented which would have a capacity of 30,000 seats, but after the presentation, the construction was suspended for political reasons related to the location.

Kosovo national football team home stadiums
Stadium	Capacity	Location	Pld	W	D	L	Win %	First match		Last match		UEFA category
Stadium	Capacity	Location	Pld	W	D	L	Win %	Opponent	Date	Opponent	Date	UEFA category
Fadil Vokrri Stadium	13,500	Pristina, Kosovo	21	9	1	11	42.86	North Macedonia	8 April 2019	Croatia	5 June 2026	4/4 stars
Zahir Pajaziti Stadium	9,000	Podujevë, Kosovo	3	1	0	2	33.33	Bulgaria	1 December 2023	Croatia	31 May 2024	3/4 stars
FFK National Educational Camp	4,000	Hajvalia, Kosovo	2	2	0	0	100.00	Liechtenstein	13 July 2023	Liechtenstein	16 July 2023	1/4 stars
Gjakova City Stadium	6,000	Gjakova, Kosovo	1	1	0	0	100.00	North Macedonia, 5 April 2019				1/4 stars
Adem Jashari Olympic Stadium	18,500	Mitrovica, Kosovo	1	1	0	0	100.00	Montenegro, 26 November 2017				2/4 stars

== Results and fixtures ==
- The following is a list of match results in the last 12 months, as well as any future matches that have been scheduled.

Legend

Win Draw Lose Void or postponed Fixture

=== 2026 ===
3 March 2027 World Cup qualification	Kosovo	6–0	Gibraltar	Pristina, Kosovo
17:00	Biqkaj 4'; Sahiti 26'; Uka 63'; Memeti 72'; Fetaj 76', 87'	Report		Stadium: Fadil Vokrri Stadium; Attendance: 100; Referee: Oxana Cruc (Moldova)

7 March 2027 World Cup qualification	Croatia	0–1	Kosovo	Karlovac, Croatia
17:00		Report	Uka 13'	Stadium: Stadion Branko Čavlović-Čavlek; Attendance: 200; Referee: Lovisa Johansson (Sweden)

14 April 2027 World Cup qualification	Bulgaria	1–3	Kosovo	Sofia, Bulgaria
16:00 (17:00 UTC+3)	Yaneva 9'	Report	Memeti 15'; Smaili 21'; Fejza 89'	Stadium: Stadion Aleksandar Shalamanov; Attendance: 250; Referee: Zoe Stavrou (Cyprus)

18 April 2027 World Cup qualification	Kosovo	2–1	Bulgaria	Pristina, Kosovo
18:00	Smaili 52'; Memeti 90+6'	Report	Petrova 42'	Stadium: Fadil Vokrri Stadium; Attendance: 260; Referee: Jana Van Laere (Belgium)

5 June 2027 World Cup qualification	Kosovo	0–1	Croatia	Pristina, Kosovo
19:00		Report	Čanjevac 15'	Stadium: Fadil Vokrri Stadium; Attendance: 800; Referee: Karoline Wacker (Germany)

9 June 2027 World Cup qualification	Gibraltar	0–8	Kosovo	Europa Point, Gibraltar
19:00		Report	Halilaj 3'; Memeti 7', 21'; Biqkaj 14'; Smaili 32', 76'; Uka 68'; Fetaj 84'	Stadium: Europa Sports Park; Referee: Marisca Overtoom (Netherlands)

9 October 2027 World Cup qualification play-offs	Kosovo	1–2	Austria	Vienna, Austria
17:00	Memeti 14'	Report (FIFA); Report (UEFA)	Schöffel 37'; Billa 81'	Stadium: Sportclub-Platz Dornbach; Referee: Kristina Georgieva (Bulgaria)

13 October 2027 World Cup qualification play-offs	Austria	4–0	Kosovo	Vienna, Austria
18:00	Höbinger 7'; Puntigam 65'; Kirchberger 86'; Campbell 90'	Report (FIFA); Report (UEFA)		Stadium: Sportclub-Platz Dornbach; Referee: Nanna Løf Andersen (Denmark)

27 November Friendly	Malta	v	Kosovo	Ta' Qali, Malta
				Stadium: Centenary Stadium

== Coaching staff ==
=== Current coaching staff ===
Position	Name
Head coach	(Kosovo) Sami Sermaxhaj
Assistant coach(es)
Assistant coach(es)	(Albania) (Kosovo) Xhemile Berisha
Assistant coach(es)	(Kosovo) Sanije Krasniqi
Fitness coach	(Kosovo) Fitim Shabani
Goalkeeping coach	(Kosovo) (Albania) Diellza Musa
Physiotherapist(s)
Physiotherapist(s)	(Kosovo) Florentina Lahu
Physiotherapist(s)	(Kosovo) Qendresa Ajvazi
Doctor	(Kosovo) Vlora Podvorica
Kit manager	(Kosovo) Liburn Rama
Team manager	(Kosovo) Valbona Gashi Uka

=== Manager history ===
No.	Name	Period
1	(Kosovo) Afërdita Fazlija	2015–2022
2	(Sweden) Karin Anneli Andersén	2022–2024
3	(Kosovo) Sami Sermaxhaj	2024–present

== Players ==
=== Current squad ===
- The following players were called up for the 2027 World Cup qualification matches against Croatia and Gibraltar, on 5 and 9 June 2026.

No.	Pos.	Player	Date of birth (age)	Club (Note: Domestic players' clubs are listed as "unknown" due to limited coverage, while players abroad are listed with the club for which they last played a competitive match before the call-up.)
1	GK	Alma Demiri	27 June 2005 (age 21)	(German Football Association) Fortuna Köln
12	GK	Florentina Kolgeci	30 October 2000 (age 26)	(Turkish Football Federation) Amed
16	GK	Djellza Mehmeti	27 October 2006 (age 20)	(Football Federation of Kosovo) unknown
2	DF	Rrezona Ramadani	5 September 2002 (age 24)	(Turkish Football Federation) Ünye
3	DF	Agnesa Gashi	21 May 1998 (age 28)	(Turkish Football Federation) Ankara BB Fomget
5	DF	Blerta Smaili	8 May 2002 (age 24)	(Turkish Football Federation) Ankara BB Fomget
18	DF	Laureta Crnaveri	27 February 2001 (age 25)	(German Football Association) SV Elversberg
20	DF	Aurora Mulliqi	12 September 2007 (age 19)	(Football Federation of Kosovo) unknown
21	DF	Albulena Fejza	24 September 2002 (age 24)	(Football Federation of Kosovo) unknown
22	DF	Kreshnike Ramaja	20 September 2005 (age 21)	(Football Federation of Kosovo) unknown
4	MF	Alisa Sinani	1 September 2004 (age 22)	(German Football Association) Bayer Leverkusen
6	MF	Lumbardha Misini	2 April 2003 (age 23)	(Swiss Football Association) Servette Chênois
7	MF	Erëleta Memeti (captain)	30 June 1999 (age 27)	(German Football Association) Eintracht Frankfurt
8	MF	Gentiana Fetaj	4 August 2002 (age 24)	(Swiss Football Association) Luzern
10	MF	Donjeta Halilaj	12 March 2000 (age 26)	(Turkish Football Federation) Trabzonspor
13	MF	Sara Sahiti	14 May 2006 (age 20)	(German Football Association) TSG Hoffenheim II
15	MF	Marigonë Tahiri	25 February 1999 (age 27)	(Turkish Football Federation) Ünye
9	FW	Kaltrina Biqkaj	5 August 2000 (age 26)	(Turkish Football Federation) Trabzonspor
11	FW	Elona Paci	16 August 2002 (age 24)	(German Football Association) 1. FC Köln II
14	FW	Valentina Metaj	9 November 2000 (age 26)	(Swedish Football Association) IFK Göteborg
17	FW	Riga Kallaba	14 September 2007 (age 19)	(United States Soccer Federation) Loyola Ramblers
19	FW	Aurela Imeraj	4 September 2007 (age 19)	(Norwegian Football Federation) Kolbotn IL
23	FW	Modesta Uka	23 May 1999 (age 27)	(Austrian Football Association) Austria Wien

=== Recent call-ups ===
The following players have been called up for the team within the last 12 months and are still available for selection.

Pos.	Player	Date of birth (age)	Caps	Goals	Club	Latest call-up
GK	Ema Kastrati	28 June 2004 (age 22)			(Kosovo) unknown	v. Bulgaria, 18 April 2026
GK	Leyla Gërvalla	18 July 2005 (age 21)			(Germany) Wacker München	v. Turkey, 28 October 2025
DF	Shenarta Bela	1 September 2006 (age 20)			(Kosovo) unknown	v. Gibraltar, 9 June 2026
DF	Ramize Orana	23 August 2007 (age 19)			(Kosovo) unknown	v. Croatia, 7 March 2026
DF	Fatlinda Ramaj	11 April 2003 (age 23)			(Turkey) Trabzonspor	v. Turkey, 28 October 2025
MF	Valentina Limani	2 February 1997 (age 29)			(Germany) Eintracht Frankfurt II	v. Bulgaria, 18 April 2026
MF	Ylberina Berishaj	26 May 2002 (age 24)			(Kosovo) unknown	v. Bulgaria, 18 April 2026
MF	Elza Hoti	6 July 2006 (age 20)			(Kosovo) unknown	v. Bulgaria, 18 April 2026
FW	Elira Terakaj	20 March 2008 (age 18)			(Germany) Bayern Munich II	v. Bulgaria, 14 April 2026^{DOC}
FW	Alba Shabani	24 July 2006 (age 20)			(Kosovo) unknown	v. Croatia, 7 March 2026
FW	Loreta Kullashi	20 May 1999 (age 27)			(Spain) Badalona	v. Gibraltar, 3 March 2026^{DOC}
FW	Aurona Racaj	2 December 2004 (age 21)			(Kosovo) unknown	v. Turkey, 28 October 2025
Notes: ^{PRE} = Preliminary squad/standby.; ^{DOC} = Is not available due to problems with documentations.

== Competitive record ==
=== FIFA World Cup ===
On 19 January 2017, in Nyon, it was decided that Kosovo should be part in Group 2 of the 2019 FIFA World Cup qualification, together with Albania, Greece and Malta. On 6 April 2017, Kosovo made their debut on 2019 FIFA World Cup qualifications with a 3–2 away defeat against Albania.

FIFA World Cup record										Qualification record					
Year	Round	Pos	Pld	W	D	L	GF	GA	Squad	Pld	W	D	L	GF	GA
(Sweden) 1995	Part of FR Yugoslavia														
(United States) 1999	Part of FR Yugoslavia														
(United States) 2003	Team did not exist														
(China) 2007	Team did not exist														
(Germany) 2011	Not a FIFA member														
(Canada) 2015	Not a FIFA member														
(France) 2019	Did not qualify									3	0	0	3	3	12
(Australia) (New Zealand) 2023	Did not qualify									10	2	1	7	8	35
(Brazil) 2027	Did not qualify									8	5	0	3	21	9
(Costa Rica) (Jamaica) (Mexico) (United States) 2031	To be determined									To be determined					
(United Kingdom) 2035	To be determined									To be determined					
Total	—	0/9	0	0	0	0	0	0	—	21	7	1	13	32	56

=== UEFA European Championship ===
On 21 February 2019, in Nyon, it was decided that Kosovo should be part in Group A of the UEFA Euro 2021 qualifying, together with Estonia, Russia, Slovenia, Turkey and 2019 World Cup runners-up finisher Netherlands. On 30 August 2019, Kosovo made their debut on UEFA European Championship qualifying with a 2–0 home win against Turkey, which was also the team's first-ever competitive win.

UEFA European Championship record										Qualifying record							
Year	Round	Pos	Pld	W	D	L	GF	GA	Squad	Pld	W	D	L	GF	GA	P/R	Rnk
(Italy) 1993	Part of FR Yugoslavia																
(Norway) (Sweden) 1997	Part of FR Yugoslavia																
(Germany) 2001	Team did not exist																
(England) 2005	Team did not exist																
(Finland) 2009	Team did not exist																
(Sweden) 2013	Not a UEFA member																
(Netherlands) 2017	Could not enter																
(England) 2022	Did not qualify									10	3	1	6	6	29	—	
(Switzerland) 2025	Did not qualify									6	0	0	6	0	17	▼ (Note: From Euro 2025 onwards a new qualifying format was introduced, linked to the Nations League where teams are divided into leagues with promotion/relegation between the leagues at the end of each cycle.)	32nd
(Germany) 2029	To be determined									To be determined							
Total	—	0/2	0	0	0	0	0	0	—	16	3	1	12	6	46	32nd	

=== UEFA Nations League ===
Kosovo's Nations League record
First match	Bulgaria 0–0 Kosovo (Plovdiv, Bulgaria; 26 September 2023)
Biggest win	Kosovo 5–1 Bulgaria (Podujevë, Kosovo; 1 December 2023)
Best result	1st in 2023–24

On 2 May 2023, in Nyon, it was decided that Kosovo should be part of League C in Group 5 of the 2023–24 UEFA Nations League, together with Bulgaria and North Macedonia.

UEFA Nations League record
League phase												Finals								
Year	Lg	Gp	Pos	Pld	W	D	L	GF	GA	P/R	Rnk	Year	Pos	Pld	W	D	L	GF	GA	Squad
2023–24	C	5	1st	4	3	1	0	10	2	▲	36th	(France) (Netherlands) (Spain) 2024	Could not qualify							
2025	C	6	2nd	6	2	1	3	9	10	*	40th	(France) (Germany) (Spain) (Sweden) 2025	Could not qualify							
Total				10	5	2	3	19	12	36th		Total		0	0	0	0	0	0	—

▲	Promoted at end of season
Same position	No movement at end of season
▼	Relegated at end of season
*	Participated in promotion/relegation play-offs

=== Other tournaments ===
Kosovo has so far participated in four editions of the Turkish Women's Cup, the first time was in the 2017 edition, when Kosovo lost in all three matches of this tournament against Poland (0–5), which was also her first international match as a FIFA member, against Romania (0–3) and against the host Turkey (2–4). A year later, Kosovo again participated in the 2018 edition, when they lost against France (0–6), Ukraine (0–2), draw against Kazakhstan (1–1) and win against Northern Ireland (1–0).

Turkish Women's Cup

Year	Round	Pos	Pld	W	D	L	GF	GA	Squad
2017	Group stage	4th	3	0	0	3	2	12	Squad
2018	Group stage	5th	4	1	1	2	2	9	Squad
2019 to 2022	Not invited								
2023	Champions	1st	3	3	0	0	11	2	Squad
2024	Champions	1st	3	3	0	0	5	0	Squad
2025–present	Not invited								
Total	Champions	4/4	13	7	1	5	20	23	—

BFU International Women's Cup

Year	Round	Pos	Pld	W	D	L	GF	GA	Squad
2023	Champions	1st	2	2	0	0	2	0	—
Total	Champions	1/1	2	2	0	0	2	0	—

== Head-to-head record ==
As of 18 April 2025

Head-to-head records are included only matches as FIFA member.

Team	Pld	W	D	L	GF	GA	GD	Win %
Albania	3	0	1	2	4	7	−3	0.00
Armenia	2	2	0	0	3	1	+2	100.00
Austria	2	0	0	2	1	6	−5	0.00
Belgium	2	0	0	2	1	13	−12	0.00
Bulgaria	8	7	1	0	19	6	+13	87.50
Croatia	3	1	0	2	1	3	−2	33.33
Estonia	6	5	0	1	18	4	+14	83.33
France	1	0	0	1	0	6	−6	0.00
Gibraltar	2	2	0	0	14	0	+14	100.00
Greece	1	0	0	1	0	6	−6	0.00
Hong Kong	2	2	0	0	8	0	+8	100.00
India	1	1	0	0	1	0	+1	100.00
Kazakhstan	1	0	1	0	1	1	+0	0.00
Latvia	2	1	0	1	1	1	+0	50.00
Liechtenstein	2	2	0	0	2	0	+2	100.00
Luxembourg	1	1	0	0	5	0	+5	100.00
Malta	1	0	0	1	1	3	−2	0.00
Montenegro	1	1	0	0	3	2	+1	100.00
Netherlands	2	0	0	2	0	12	−12	0.00
Norway	2	0	0	2	1	8	−7	0.00
North Macedonia	7	6	1	0	16	3	+13	85.71
Northern Ireland	1	1	0	0	1	0	+1	100.00
Poland	3	0	0	3	1	12	−11	0.00
Russia	2	0	0	2	0	8	−8	0.00
Romania	1	0	0	1	0	3	−3	0.00
Slovenia	2	0	0	2	0	8	−8	0.00
Turkey	5	1	1	3	4	11	−7	20.00
Ukraine	3	0	0	3	1	10	−9	0.00
Wales	2	0	0	2	0	8	−8	0.00
19 Countries	69	32	5	32	110	142	−32	46.38

== See also ==
- Sport in Kosovo
  - Football in Kosovo
    - Women's football in Kosovo

Men's

- Senior
- Under-21
- Under-19
- Under-17
- Under-15
- Futsal

Women's

- Under-19
- Under-17
