= 2018–19 UEFA Women's Champions League qualifying round =

Tournament details
- Dates: 7–13 August 2018
- Teams: 40 (from 40 associations)

Tournament statistics
- Matches played: 60
- Goals scored: 275 (4.58 per match)
- Attendance: 12,413 (207 per match)
- Top scorer(s): Krystyna Freda (6 goals)

The 2018–19 UEFA Women's Champions League qualifying round was played between 7 and 13 August 2018. A total of 40 teams competed in the qualifying round to decide 12 of the 32 places in the knockout phase of the 2018–19 UEFA Women's Champions League.

== Draw ==
The draw of the qualifying round was held at the UEFA headquarters in Nyon, Switzerland on 22 June 2018, 13:30 CEST. The teams were allocated into four seeding positions based on their UEFA club coefficients at the beginning of the season. They were drawn into groups of four containing one team from each of the four seeding positions. First, the teams which were pre-selected as hosts were drawn from their own designated pot and allocated to their respective group as per their seeding positions. Next, the remaining teams were drawn from their respective pot which were allocated according to their seeding positions.

Based on the decision taken by the UEFA Emergency Panel at its meeting in Paris on 9 June 2016, teams from Serbia or Bosnia and Herzegovina would not be drawn against teams from Kosovo.

Below are the 40 teams which participate in the qualifying round (with their 2018 UEFA club coefficients, which take into account their performance in European competitions from 2013–14 to 2017–18 plus 33% of their association coefficient from the same time span), with the ten teams which are pre-selected as hosts marked by (H).

Key to colours
Group winners and best two runners-up advance to round of 32

Seeding position 1
Team	Coeff
(Czech Republic) Slavia Praha	45.550
(Scotland) Glasgow City (H)	35.415
(Kazakhstan) BIIK Kazygurt	28.920
(Lithuania) Gintra Universitetas (H)	25.270
(Serbia) Spartak Subotica	19.285
(Romania) Olimpia Cluj	15.960
(Bosnia and Herzegovina) SFK 2000 (H)	14.630
(Belarus) FC Minsk	14.460
(Norway) Avaldsnes	13.920
(Netherlands) Ajax	13.250

Seeding position 2
Team	Coeff
(Hungary) MTK Hungária (H)	11.960
(Croatia) Osijek (H)	11.305
(Ukraine) Zhytlobud-1 Kharkiv (H)	10.470
(Switzerland) Basel	10.890
(Iceland) Þór/KA	9.930
(Estonia) Pärnu	8.645
(Austria) Landhaus Wien	8.415
(Bulgaria) NSA Sofia	6.650
(Poland) Górnik Łęczna	6.600
(Cyprus) Barcelona FA	5.940

Seeding position 3
Team	Coeff
(Portugal) Sporting CP	5.465
(Republic of Ireland) Wexford Youths	5.305
(Albania) Vllaznia Shkodër	4.655
(Slovenia) Olimpija Ljubljana (H)	4.300
(Turkey) Ataşehir Belediyespor	4.290
(Belgium) Anderlecht	4.125
(Greece) Elpides Karditsas	3.135
(Finland) Honka	3.135
(Wales) Cardiff Met.	2.660
(Israel) Kiryat Gat	2.480

Seeding position 4
Team	Coeff
(Slovakia) Slovan Bratislava	2.155
(Montenegro) Breznica Pljevlja (H)	1.660
(Latvia) Rīgas FS (H)	1.330
(Faroe Islands) EB/Streymur/Skála	0.990
(Northern Ireland) Linfield (H)	0.660
(Kosovo) Mitrovica	0.330
(Malta) Birkirkara	0.165
(Moldova) Agarista-ȘS Anenii Noi	0.165
(Georgia (country)) Martve	0.000
(North Macedonia) Dragon 2014	0.000

== Format ==
In each group, teams played against each other in a round-robin mini-tournament at the pre-selected hosts. The group winners and the two runners-up with the best record against the teams finishing first and third in their group advanced to the round of 32 to join the 20 teams which received a bye.

=== Tiebreakers ===
Teams are ranked according to points (3 points for a win, 1 point for a draw, 0 points for a loss), and if tied on points, the following tiebreaking criteria are applied, in the order given, to determine the rankings (Regulations Articles 14.01 and 14.02):

1. Points in head-to-head matches among tied teams;
2. Goal difference in head-to-head matches among tied teams;
3. Goals scored in head-to-head matches among tied teams;
4. If more than two teams are tied, and after applying all head-to-head criteria above, a subset of teams are still tied, all head-to-head criteria above are reapplied exclusively to this subset of teams;
5. Goal difference in all group matches;
6. Goals scored in all group matches;
7. Penalty shoot-out if only two teams have the same number of points, and they met in the last round of the group and are tied after applying all criteria above (not used if more than two teams have the same number of points, or if their rankings are not relevant for qualification for the next stage);
8. Disciplinary points (red card = 3 points, yellow card = 1 point, expulsion for two yellow cards in one match = 3 points);
9. UEFA club coefficient.

To determine the best runners-up, the results against the teams in fourth place are discarded. The following criteria are applied (Regulations Article 14.03):

1. Points;
2. Goal difference;
3. Goals scored;
4. Disciplinary points;
5. UEFA club coefficient.

== Groups ==
The matches were played on 7, 10 and 13 August 2018. The schedule of each group was as follows, with two rest days between each matchday (Regulations Article 19.05):

Qualifying round schedule
Matchday	Date	Matches
Matchday 1	7 August 2018	1 v 3, 2 v 4
Matchday 2	10 August 2018	1 v 4, 3 v 2
Matchday 3	13 August 2018	2 v 1, 4 v 3

Times are CEST (UTC+2), as listed by UEFA (local times, if different, are in parentheses).

=== Group 1 ===
Pos	Team	Pld	W	D	L	GF	GA	GD	Pts	Qualification	AJA	ÞKA	WEX	LIN
1	(Netherlands) Ajax	3	2	1	0	6	1	+5	7	Round of 32	—	—	4–1	2–0
2	(Iceland) Þór/KA	3	2	1	0	5	0	+5	7	Round of 32	0–0	—	—	2–0
3	(Republic of Ireland) Wexford Youths	3	1	0	2	4	9	−5	3		—	0–3	—	—
4	(Northern Ireland) Linfield (H)	3	0	0	3	2	7	−5	0		—	—	2–3	—

Source: UEFA
Rules for classification: Qualifying round tiebreakers
(H) Hosts
7 August 2018
15:00 (14:00 BST)

Ajax (Netherlands)	4–1	(Republic of Ireland) Wexford Youths
De Sanders 48'; Jansen 52'; Oudemast 67'; Van der Most 73'	Report	Jarrett 46'

Seaview, Belfast
Attendance: 224
Referee: Maria Marotta (Italy)
7 August 2018
20:30 (19:30 BST)

Þór/KA (Iceland)	2–0	(Northern Ireland) Linfield
Calderón 12'; Mayor 83'	Report

Seaview, Belfast
Attendance: 331
Referee: Barbara Poxhofer (Austria)

10 August 2018
15:00 (14:00 BST)

Ajax (Netherlands)	2–0	(Northern Ireland) Linfield
Salmi 28'; Lewerissa 48'	Report

Seaview, Belfast
Attendance: 360
Referee: Ewa Augustyn (Poland)
10 August 2018
20:30 (19:30 BST)

Wexford Youths (Republic of Ireland)	0–3	(Iceland) Þór/KA
	Report	Jessen 5'; Hannesdóttir 10'; Jónsdóttir 18'

Seaview, Belfast
Attendance: 163
Referee: Barbara Poxhofer (Austria)

13 August 2018
17:00 (16:00 BST)

Þór/KA (Iceland)	0–0	(Netherlands) Ajax
	Report

Solitude, Belfast
Attendance: 20
Referee: Maria Marotta (Italy)
13 August 2018
17:00 (16:00 BST)

Linfield (Northern Ireland)	2–3	(Republic of Ireland) Wexford Youths
Bell 43'; Timoney 90+3'	Report	Perry 11' (o.g.); Jarrett 19'; Murphy 90+5'

Seaview, Belfast
Attendance: 267
Referee: Ewa Augustyn (Poland)

=== Group 2 ===
Pos	Team	Pld	W	D	L	GF	GA	GD	Pts	Qualification	BAR	MIN	SLO	LJU
1	(Cyprus) Barcelona FA	3	3	0	0	10	0	+10	9	Round of 32	—	2–0	2–0	—
2	(Belarus) FC Minsk	3	2	0	1	7	2	+5	6		—	—	1–0	6–0
3	(Slovakia) Slovan Bratislava	3	1	0	2	1	3	−2	3		—	—	—	1–0
4	(Slovenia) Olimpija Ljubljana (H)	3	0	0	3	0	13	−13	0		0–6	—	—	—

Source: UEFA
Rules for classification: Qualifying round tiebreakers
(H) Hosts
7 August 2018
14:00

FC Minsk (Belarus)	6–0	(Slovenia) Olimpija Ljubljana
Pilipenko 40', 45+2'; Ogbiagbevha 44', 77'; Shmatko 58'; Diakité 83'	Report

ŽŠD Ljubljana Stadium, Ljubljana
Attendance: 200
Referee: Tinna Høj Christensen (Denmark)
7 August 2018
18:15

Barcelona FA (Cyprus)	2–0	(Slovakia) Slovan Bratislava
Freda 7', 37'	Report

ŽŠD Ljubljana Stadium, Ljubljana
Attendance: 80
Referee: Karoline Wacker (Germany)

10 August 2018
14:00

FC Minsk (Belarus)	1–0	(Slovakia) Slovan Bratislava
Pribilová 75' (o.g.)	Report

ŽŠD Ljubljana Stadium, Ljubljana
Attendance: 30
Referee: Iuliana Demetrescu (Romania)
10 August 2018
18:15

Olimpija Ljubljana (Slovenia)	0–6	(Cyprus) Barcelona FA
	Report	Hayes 48', 67'; Freda 50', 88'; Akaffou 51'; Georgiou 74'

ŽŠD Ljubljana Stadium, Ljubljana
Attendance: 200
Referee: Karoline Wacker (Germany)

13 August 2018
17:00

Barcelona FA (Cyprus)	2–0	(Belarus) FC Minsk
Freda 30', 83'	Report

ŽŠD Ljubljana Stadium, Ljubljana
Attendance: 40
Referee: Tinna Høj Christensen (Denmark)
13 August 2018
17:00

Slovan Bratislava (Slovakia)	1–0	(Slovenia) Olimpija Ljubljana
Hollá 74'	Report

Stožice Stadium, Ljubljana
Attendance: 300
Referee: Iuliana Demetrescu (Romania)

=== Group 3 ===
Pos	Team	Pld	W	D	L	GF	GA	GD	Pts	Qualification	GLA	AND	GÓR	MAR
1	(Scotland) Glasgow City (H)	3	2	0	1	10	2	+8	6 (Note: Head-to-head results: Glasgow City 1–2 Anderlecht, Anderlecht 0–1 Górnik Łęczna, Górnik Łęczna 0–2 Glasgow City. Head-to-head standings: Glasgow City: 3 pts, +1 GD (3 GF, 2 GA); Anderlecht: 3 pts, 0 GD (2 GF, 2 GA); Górnik Łęczna: 3 pts, −1 GD (1 GF, 2 GA))	Round of 32	—	1–2	—	7–0
2	(Belgium) Anderlecht	3	2	0	1	12	2	+10	6		—	—	0–1	—
3	(Poland) Górnik Łęczna	3	2	0	1	13	2	+11	6		0–2	—	—	12–0
4	(Georgia (country)) Martve	3	0	0	3	0	29	−29	0		—	0–10	—	—

Source: UEFA
Rules for classification: Qualifying round tiebreakers
(H) Hosts
Notes:
7 August 2018
13:30 (12:30 BST)

Glasgow City (Scotland)	1–2	(Belgium) Anderlecht
Ivanuša 90+3'	Report	Van Kerkhoven 24'; Van Gorp 82'

Oriam, Edinburgh
Attendance: 180
Referee: Tanja Subotič (Slovenia)
7 August 2018
17:00 (16:00 BST)

Górnik Łęczna (Poland)	12–0	(Georgia (country)) Martve
Grzywińska 4'; Grabowska 6'; Kamczyk 11', 47', 53', 83'; Zdunek 44', 49' (pen.), 57' (pen.); Zawistowska 68' (pen.); Jędrzejewicz 69'; Sikora 77'	Report

Ainslie Park, Edinburgh
Attendance: 40
Referee: Hristiana Guteva (Bulgaria)

10 August 2018
13:30 (12:30 BST)

Glasgow City (Scotland)	7–0	(Georgia (country)) Martve
Grant 4', 23'; Howat 48', 68', 86'; Love 52'; Clark 82'	Report

Oriam, Edinburgh
Attendance: 180
Referee: Shona Shukrula (Netherlands)
10 August 2018
17:00 (16:00 BST)

Anderlecht (Belgium)	0–1	(Poland) Górnik Łęczna
	Report	Matysik 39'

Ainslie Park, Edinburgh
Attendance: 150
Referee: Hristiana Guteva (Bulgaria)

13 August 2018
17:00 (16:00 BST)

Górnik Łęczna (Poland)	0–2	(Scotland) Glasgow City
	Report	Love 33'; Kerr 85'

Oriam, Edinburgh
Attendance: 220
Referee: Tanja Subotič (Slovenia)
13 August 2018
17:00 (16:00 BST)

Martve (Georgia (country))	0–10	(Belgium) Anderlecht
	Report	De Caigny 17', 17', 35', 73', 85'; Van Kerkhoven 26', 67'; Vătafu 78'; De Frère 82'; Merchiers 82'

Ainslie Park, Edinburgh
Attendance: 28
Referee: Shona Shukrula (Netherlands)

=== Group 4 ===
Pos	Team	Pld	W	D	L	GF	GA	GD	Pts	Qualification	SLA	MTK	ATA	MIT
1	(Czech Republic) Slavia Praha	3	3	0	0	15	3	+12	9	Round of 32	—	—	7–2	4–0
2	(Hungary) MTK Hungária (H)	3	1	1	1	9	7	+2	4		1–4	—	—	6–1
3	(Turkey) Ataşehir Belediyespor	3	1	1	1	10	10	0	4		—	2–2	—	—
4	(Kosovo) Mitrovica	3	0	0	3	2	16	−14	0		—	—	1–6	—

Source: UEFA
Rules for classification: Qualifying round tiebreakers
(H) Hosts
7 August 2018
18:00

Slavia Praha (Czech Republic)	7–2	(Turkey) Ataşehir Belediyespor
M. Dubcová 16'; Svitková 17'; Divišová 37', 74'; Kožárová 42', 59'; Jarchovská 72'	Report	Uraz 23'; Akaba 56'

Hévízi úti Stadion, Budapest
Attendance: 30
Referee: Karolina Radzik-Johan (Poland)
7 August 2018
18:00

MTK Hungária (Hungary)	6–1	(Kosovo) Mitrovica
Nagy 7'; Demeter 44'; Oláh 48'; Csányi 51'; Pinczi 76' (pen.); Molen 79'	Report	Gjegji 82'

Hidegkuti Nándor Stadion, Budapest
Attendance: 420
Referee: Graziella Pirriatore (Italy)

10 August 2018
17:30

Slavia Praha (Czech Republic)	4–0	(Kosovo) Mitrovica
Divišová 51', 57'; K. Dubcová 66'; Szewieczková 89'	Report

Hévízi úti Stadion, Budapest
Attendance: 35
Referee: Meitar Shemesh (Israel)
10 August 2018
18:00

Ataşehir Belediyespor (Turkey)	2–2	(Hungary) MTK Hungária
Uraz 31' (pen.); Akaba 43'	Report	Nagy 33'; Molen 37'

Hidegkuti Nándor Stadion, Budapest
Attendance: 398
Referee: Graziella Pirriatore (Italy)

13 August 2018
17:00

MTK Hungária (Hungary)	1–4	(Czech Republic) Slavia Praha
Cappuzzo 39'	Report	Szewieczková 18'; K. Dubcová 63'; Divišová 72'; Svitková 88'

Hidegkuti Nándor Stadion, Budapest
Attendance: 519
Referee: Karolina Radzik-Johan (Poland)
13 August 2018
17:00

Mitrovica (Kosovo)	1–6	(Turkey) Ataşehir Belediyespor
Jashari 66'	Report	Sunday 2'; Houij 22', 63'; Çınar 38'; Uraz 41'; Akaba 50'

Hévízi úti Stadion, Budapest
Attendance: 30
Referee: Meitar Shemesh (Israel)

=== Group 5 ===
Pos	Team	Pld	W	D	L	GF	GA	GD	Pts	Qualification	SUB	BAS	KIR	BRE
1	(Serbia) Spartak Subotica	3	3	0	0	10	0	+10	9	Round of 32	—	—	1–0	4–0
2	(Switzerland) Basel	3	2	0	1	7	5	+2	6		0–5	—	—	4–0
3	(Israel) Kiryat Gat	3	0	1	2	4	8	−4	1		—	0–3	—	—
4	(Montenegro) Breznica Pljevlja (H)	3	0	1	2	4	12	−8	1		—	—	4–4	—

Source: UEFA
Rules for classification: Qualifying round tiebreakers
(H) Hosts
7 August 2018
17:00

Spartak Subotica (Serbia)	1–0	(Israel) Kiryat Gat
Pleuler 36'	Report

Gradski stadion, Nikšić
Attendance: 25
Referee: Petra Pavlíková (Slovakia)
7 August 2018
17:00

Basel (Switzerland)	4–0	(Montenegro) Breznica Pljevlja
Šundov 22'; Banecki 59'; Buser 65'; Peromingo 68'	Report

Podgorica City Stadium, Podgorica
Attendance: 75
Referee: Viola Raudziņa (Latvia)

10 August 2018
18:00

Spartak Subotica (Serbia)	4–0	(Montenegro) Breznica Pljevlja
Okyere 13', 58'; Rosa 40'; Hix 84'	Report

Gradski stadion, Nikšić
Attendance: 30
Referee: Galiya Echeva (Bulgaria)
10 August 2018
18:00

Kiryat Gat (Israel)	0–3	(Switzerland) Basel
	Report	Jenzer 12'; Buser 40'; Bunter 54'

Podgorica City Stadium, Podgorica
Attendance: 20
Referee: Viola Raudziņa (Latvia)

13 August 2018
17:00

Basel (Switzerland)	0–5	(Serbia) Spartak Subotica
	Report	Hix 36'; Slović 45+2' (pen.); Pavlović 75'; Matić 87'; Baka 90'

Gradski stadion, Nikšić
Attendance: 70
Referee: Petra Pavlíková (Slovakia)
13 August 2018
17:00

Breznica Pljevlja (Montenegro)	4–4	(Israel) Kiryat Gat
Jakovska 11'; Vujadinović 17'; Jankov 53', 57'	Report	Laiu 8'; Avital 36'; Schulmann 38'; Šaranović 40' (o.g.)

Podgorica City Stadium, Podgorica
Attendance: 20
Referee: Galiya Echeva (Bulgaria)

=== Group 6 ===
Pos	Team	Pld	W	D	L	GF	GA	GD	Pts	Qualification	KHA	CLU	CAR	BIR
1	(Ukraine) Zhytlobud-1 Kharkiv (H)	3	3	0	0	16	3	+13	9	Round of 32	—	3–1	—	8–0
2	(Romania) Olimpia Cluj	3	2	0	1	10	6	+4	6		—	—	3–2	6–1
3	(Wales) Cardiff Met.	3	0	1	2	6	10	−4	1		2–5	—	—	—
4	(Malta) Birkirkara	3	0	1	2	3	16	−13	1		—	—	2–2	—

Source: UEFA
Rules for classification: Qualifying round tiebreakers
(H) Hosts
7 August 2018
10:00 (11:00 EEST)

Olimpia Cluj (Romania)	3–2	(Wales) Cardiff Met.
Bâtea 62'; Carp 72'; Browne 74'	Report	Clipston 24'; Phillips 73'

FC Metalist Training Ground n.2, Vysokyi
Attendance: 50
Referee: Justina Lavrenovaitė (Lithuania)
7 August 2018
16:00 (17:00 EEST)

Zhytlobud-1 Kharkiv (Ukraine)	8–0	(Malta) Birkirkara
Shevchuk 6'; Apanashchenko 9'; Kunina 26', 62'; Voronina 36', 43'; Mozolska 78'; Petryk 85'	Report

FC Metalist Training Ground, Vysokyi
Attendance: 480
Referee: Marina Višnjić (Serbia)

10 August 2018
10:00 (11:00 EEST)

Olimpia Cluj (Romania)	6–1	(Malta) Birkirkara
Bâtea 17'; Browne 45'; Carp 61', 90+2'; Ciolacu 72'; Voicu 77'	Report	Parnis 21'

FC Metalist Training Ground n.2, Vysokyi
Attendance: 75
Referee: María Dolores Martínez Madrona (Spain)
10 August 2018
16:00 (17:00 EEST)

Cardiff Met. (Wales)	2–5	(Ukraine) Zhytlobud-1 Kharkiv
Westhoff 25'; Murray 76'	Report	Shevchuk 5'; Ovdiychuk 10'; Kochnyeva 39'; Finch 59' (o.g.); Apanashchenko 87'

FC Metalist Training Ground, Vysokyi
Attendance: 400
Referee: Marina Višnjić (Serbia)

13 August 2018
17:00 (18:00 EEST)

Zhytlobud-1 Kharkiv (Ukraine)	3–1	(Romania) Olimpia Cluj
Kunina 36'; Apanashchenko 50', 71'	Report	Carp 72'

Metalist Oblast Sports Complex, Kharkiv
Attendance: 2,500
Referee: Justina Lavrenovaitė (Lithuania)
13 August 2018
17:00 (18:00 EEST)

Birkirkara (Malta)	2–2	(Wales) Cardiff Met.
Giusti 27'; Carabott 44'	Report	Murray 11'; Turner 35'

FC Metalist Training Ground, Vysokyi
Attendance: 50
Referee: María Dolores Martínez Madrona (Spain)

=== Group 7 ===
Pos	Team	Pld	W	D	L	GF	GA	GD	Pts	Qualification	BII	KAR	WIE	RIG
1	(Kazakhstan) BIIK Kazygurt	3	3	0	0	9	1	+8	9	Round of 32	—	2–1	—	5–0
2	(Greece) Elpides Karditsas	3	2	0	1	6	4	+2	6		—	—	3–1	—
3	(Austria) Landhaus Wien	3	1	0	2	3	6	−3	3		0–2	—	—	2–1
4	(Latvia) Rīgas FS (H)	3	0	0	3	2	9	−7	0		—	1–2	—	—

Source: UEFA
Rules for classification: Qualifying round tiebreakers
(H) Hosts
7 August 2018
11:00 (12:00 EEST)

BIIK Kazygurt (Kazakhstan)	2–1	(Greece) Elpides Karditsas
Gabelia 18'; Ikwaput 69'	Report	Ariza 7'

Stadions Arkādija, Riga
Attendance: 80
Referee: Marta Frías Acedo (Spain)
7 August 2018
17:00 (18:00 EEST)

Landhaus Wien (Austria)	2–1	(Latvia) Rīgas FS
Brunnthaler 18'; Aufhauser 46'	Report	Ševcova 72'

Stadions Arkādija, Riga
Attendance: 350
Referee: Ivana Projkovska (Macedonia)

10 August 2018
11:00 (12:00 EEST)

Elpides Karditsas (Greece)	3–1	(Austria) Landhaus Wien
Arrieta 8'; Kollia 23'; Ariza 62'	Report	Kremener 86'

Stadions Arkādija, Riga
Attendance: 90
Referee: Ivana Projkovska (Macedonia)
10 August 2018
17:00 (18:00 EEST)

BIIK Kazygurt (Kazakhstan)	5–0	(Latvia) Rīgas FS
Zhanatayeva 4'; Ihezuo 7'; Ikwaput 45+1', 59'; Babshuk 83'	Report

Stadions Arkādija, Riga
Attendance: 200
Referee: Ifeoma Kulmala (Finland)

13 August 2018
17:00 (18:00 EEST)

Landhaus Wien (Austria)	0–2	(Kazakhstan) BIIK Kazygurt
	Report	Gabelia 35'; Adule 39'

Skonto Stadium, Riga
Attendance: 50
Referee: Marta Frías Acedo (Spain)
13 August 2018
17:00 (18:00 EEST)

Rīgas FS (Latvia)	1–2	(Greece) Elpides Karditsas
Ševcova 59'	Report	Xanthi 78'; Spets 81'

Daugavgrivas Stadium, Riga
Attendance: 100
Referee: Ifeoma Kulmala (Finland)

=== Group 8 ===
Pos	Team	Pld	W	D	L	GF	GA	GD	Pts	Qualification	SFK	VLL	PÄR	ANE
1	(Bosnia and Herzegovina) SFK 2000 (H)	3	3	0	0	12	1	+11	9	Round of 32	—	5–0	—	5–0
2	(Albania) Vllaznia	3	2	0	1	7	7	0	6		—	—	3–1	—
3	(Estonia) Pärnu	3	1	0	2	4	5	−1	3		1–2	—	—	2–0
4	(Moldova) Agarista-ȘS Anenii Noi	3	0	0	3	1	11	−10	0		—	1–4	—	—

Source: UEFA
Rules for classification: Qualifying round tiebreakers
(H) Hosts
7 August 2018
11:00

Pärnu (Estonia)	2–0	(Moldova) Agarista-ȘS Anenii Noi
Bannikova 49'; Tülp 66'	Report

Asim Ferhatović Hase Stadium, Sarajevo
Attendance: 31
Referee: Elvira Nurmustafina (Kazakhstan)
7 August 2018
17:00

SFK 2000 (Bosnia and Herzegovina)	5–0	(Albania) Vllaznia
Bojat 27'; Spahić 45+2'; Kamerić 56'; Hadžić 80'; Djoković 90+2'	Report

Bosnia and Herzegovina FA Training Centre, Zenica
Attendance: 200
Referee: Sílvia Domingos (Portugal)

10 August 2018
11:00

Vllaznia (Albania)	3–1	(Estonia) Pärnu
Franja 18'; Gjini 48'; Doci 80'	Report	Shcherbachenia 12'

Asim Ferhatović Hase Stadium, Sarajevo
Attendance: 80
Referee: Elvira Nurmustafina (Kazakhstan)
10 August 2018
17:00

SFK 2000 (Bosnia and Herzegovina)	5–0	(Moldova) Agarista-ȘS Anenii Noi
Medić 3', 31'; Djoković 23', 45+3' (pen.); Bojat 47'	Report

Bosnia and Herzegovina FA Training Centre, Zenica
Attendance: 100
Referee: Henrikke Nervik (Norway)

13 August 2018
17:00

Pärnu (Estonia)	1–2	(Bosnia and Herzegovina) SFK 2000
Shcherbachenia 9'	Report	Djoković 26'; Hadžić 30'

Bosnia and Herzegovina FA Training Centre, Zenica
Attendance: 200
Referee: Sílvia Domingos (Portugal)
13 August 2018
17:00

Agarista-ȘS Anenii Noi (Moldova)	1–4	(Albania) Vllaznia
Colesnicenco 89'	Report	Muja 38', 54'; Doci 41'; Gjini 46'

Asim Ferhatović Hase Stadium, Sarajevo
Attendance: 20
Referee: Henrikke Nervik (Norway)

=== Group 9 ===
Pos	Team	Pld	W	D	L	GF	GA	GD	Pts	Qualification	GIN	HON	SOF	EBS
1	(Lithuania) Gintra Universitetas (H)	3	2	1	0	17	1	+16	7	Round of 32	—	1–1	—	7–0
2	(Finland) Honka	3	2	1	0	13	1	+12	7	Round of 32	—	—	5–0	—
3	(Bulgaria) NSA Sofia	3	1	0	2	3	14	−11	3		0–9	—	—	3–0
4	(Faroe Islands) EB/Streymur/Skála	3	0	0	3	0	17	−17	0		—	0–7	—	—

Source: UEFA
Rules for classification: Qualifying round tiebreakers
(H) Hosts
7 August 2018
13:00 (14:00 EEST)

NSA Sofia (Bulgaria)	3–0	(Faroe Islands) EB/Streymur/Skála
Radoyska 18'; Gospodinova 37'; Zheleva 68'	Report

Alytus Stadium, Alytus
Attendance: 125
Referee: Sarah Garratt (England)
7 August 2018
17:00 (18:00 EEST)

Gintra Universitetas (Lithuania)	1–1	(Finland) Honka
Smeda 90+1'	Report	Vehviläinen 31' (pen.)

Alytus Stadium, Alytus
Attendance: 450
Referee: Tess Olofsson (Sweden)

10 August 2018
12:00 (13:00 EEST)

Honka (Finland)	5–0	(Bulgaria) NSA Sofia
Tolvanen 16'; Rantala 31'; Malinen 45', 61'; Auvinen 64'	Report

Alytus Stadium, Alytus
Attendance: 120
Referee: Sarah Garratt (England)
10 August 2018
17:00 (18:00 EEST)

Gintra Universitetas (Lithuania)	7–0	(Faroe Islands) EB/Streymur/Skála
Smeda 5'; Alekperova 22'; Freitas 55', 65', 73'; Țabur 59'; Baham 82'	Report

Alytus Stadium, Alytus
Attendance: 315
Referee: Sandra Strub (Switzerland)

13 August 2018
17:00 (18:00 EEST)

NSA Sofia (Bulgaria)	0–9	(Lithuania) Gintra Universitetas
	Report	Veličkaitė 13'; Naydenova 14' (o.g.); Čubrilo 22', 68'; Freitas 39', 73'; Gailevičiūtė 55'; Țabur 80'; Gudchenko 87'

Alytus Stadium, Alytus
Attendance: 512
Referee: Tess Olofsson (Sweden)
13 August 2018
17:00 (18:00 EEST)

EB/Streymur/Skála (Faroe Islands)	0–7	(Finland) Honka
	Report	Huusko 44'; Tolvanen 57'; Lappalainen 64'; Vehviläinen 69', 90+3' (pen.); Punsar 73'; Vlasoff 84'

Sūduva Stadium, Marijampolė
Attendance: 35
Referee: Sandra Strub (Switzerland)

=== Group 10 ===
Pos	Team	Pld	W	D	L	GF	GA	GD	Pts	Qualification	AVA	SPO	OSI	DRA
1	(Norway) Avaldsnes	3	2	1	0	8	4	+4	7	Round of 32	—	3–2	—	3–0
2	(Portugal) Sporting CP	3	2	0	1	9	3	+6	6		—	—	3–0	—
3	(Croatia) Osijek (H)	3	1	1	1	15	5	+10	4		2–2	—	—	13–0
4	(North Macedonia) Dragon 2014	3	0	0	3	0	20	−20	0		—	0–4	—	—

Source: UEFA
Rules for classification: Qualifying round tiebreakers
(H) Hosts
7 August 2018
16:00

Avaldsnes (Norway)	3–2	(Portugal) Sporting CP
Enganamouit 3'; Waldus 61'; Pedersen 89'	Report	Borges 38'; Wojcik 48'

Stadion Gradski vrt, Osijek
Attendance: 35
Referee: Cheryl Foster (Wales)
7 August 2018
20:15

Osijek (Croatia)	13–0	(North Macedonia) Dragon 2014
Andrlić 8', 45+12', 58'; Joščak 10', 45'; Bulut 45+9'; Balić 49', 50', 56'; Lojna 55'; Balog 68', 72'; Maltašić 80'	Report

Stadion Gradski vrt, Osijek
Attendance: 208
Referee: Volha Tsiareshka (Belarus)

10 August 2018
16:00

Avaldsnes (Norway)	3–0	(North Macedonia) Dragon 2014
O'Brien 11'; Luana 21'; Duda 70'	Report

Stadion Gradski vrt, Osijek
Attendance: 21
Referee: Reelika Turi (Estonia)
10 August 2018
20:15

Sporting CP (Portugal)	3–0	(Croatia) Osijek
Wojcik 17'; Silva 38', 75'	Report

Stadion Gradski vrt, Osijek
Attendance: 478
Referee: Volha Tsiareshka (Belarus)

13 August 2018
17:00

Osijek (Croatia)	2–2	(Norway) Avaldsnes
Joščak 39'; Šalek 60'	Report	Abrahamsen 18'; Luana 82'

Stadion Gradski vrt, Osijek
Attendance: 273
Referee: Cheryl Foster (Wales)
13 August 2018
17:00

Dragon 2014 (North Macedonia)	0–4	(Portugal) Sporting CP
	Report	Silva 11'; Fontemanha 27'; Capeta 81'; Borges 90+3'

Stadion HNK Cibalia, Vinkovci
Attendance: 100
Referee: Reelika Turi (Estonia)

== Ranking of second-placed teams ==
To determine the two best second-placed teams from the qualifying round which advance to the knockout phase, only the results of the second-placed teams against the first and third-placed teams in their group were taken into account, while results against the fourth-placed team were not included. As a result, two matches played by each second-placed team counted for the purposes of determining the ranking.

Pos	Grp	Team	Pld	W	D	L	GF	GA	GD	Pts	Qualification
1	9	(Finland) Honka	2	1	1	0	6	1	+5	4	Round of 32
2	1	(Iceland) Þór/KA	2	1	1	0	3	0	+3	4	Round of 32
3	10	(Portugal) Sporting CP	2	1	0	1	5	3	+2	3	
4	7	(Greece) Elpides Karditsas	2	1	0	1	4	3	+1	3	
5	3	(Belgium) Anderlecht	2	1	0	1	2	2	0	3	
6	6	(Romania) Olimpia Cluj	2	1	0	1	4	5	−1	3	
7	2	(Belarus) FC Minsk	2	1	0	1	1	2	−1	3	
8	5	(Switzerland) Basel	2	1	0	1	3	5	−2	3	
9	8	(Albania) Vllaznia Shkodër	2	1	0	1	3	6	−3	3	
10	4	(Hungary) MTK Hungária	2	0	1	1	3	6	−3	1	

Source: UEFA
Rules for classification: 1) points; 2) goal difference; 3) goals scored; 4) disciplinary points; 5) coefficient.
