= 2016–17 UEFA Women's Champions League qualifying round =

Women's Champions League

Tournament details
- Dates: 23–28 August 2016
- Teams: 36 (from 36 associations)

Tournament statistics
- Matches played: 54
- Goals scored: 256 (4.74 per match)
- Attendance: 13,203 (245 per match)
- Top scorer: Alexandra Lunca (7 goals)

The 2016–17 UEFA Women's Champions League qualifying round was played on 23, 25 and 28 August 2016. A total of 36 teams competed in the qualifying round to decide nine of the 32 places in the knockout phase of the 2016–17 UEFA Women's Champions League.

== Draw ==
The draw was held on 24 June 2016, 13:30 CEST, at the UEFA headquarters in Nyon, Switzerland. The 36 teams were allocated into four seeding positions based on their UEFA club coefficients at the beginning of the season. They were drawn into nine groups of four containing one team from each of the four seeding positions. First, the nine teams which were pre-selected as hosts were drawn from their own designated pot and allocated to their respective group as per their seeding positions. Next, the remaining 27 teams were drawn from their respective pot which were allocated according to their seeding positions.

Based on the decision taken by the UEFA Emergency Panel at its meeting in Paris on 9 June 2016, teams from Serbia (Spartak Subotica) or Bosnia and Herzegovina (SFK 2000) would not be drawn against teams from Kosovo (Hajvalia).

Below are the 36 teams which participated in the qualifying round (with their 2016 UEFA club coefficients, which took into account their performance in European competitions from 2011–12 to 2015–16 plus 33% of their association coefficient from the same time span), with the nine teams which were pre-selected as hosts marked by (H).

Key to colours
Group winners advance to the round of 32

Seeding position 1
Team	Coeff
(Switzerland) Zürich	34.240
(Cyprus) Apollon Limassol (H)	23.940
(Belgium) Standard Liège	22.610
(Netherlands) Twente (H)	21.600
(Romania) Olimpia Cluj	21.280
(Serbia) Spartak Subotica	19.950
(Kazakhstan) BIIK Kazygurt	17.270
(Finland) PK-35 Vantaa (H)	16.290
(Bosnia and Herzegovina) SFK 2000 (H)	14.630

Seeding position 2
Team	Coeff
(Lithuania) Gintra Universitetas	13.965
(Turkey) Konak Belediyespor	13.795
(Poland) Medyk Konin (H)	13.445
(Slovenia) Pomurje (H)	11.970
(Croatia) Osijek (H)	11.970
(Ukraine) Zhytlobud Kharkiv	11.300
(Greece) PAOK	10.305
(Norway) Avaldsnes IL	9.405
(Bulgaria) NSA Sofia	8.645

Seeding position 3
Team	Coeff
(Estonia) Pärnu JK	7.980
(Belarus) FC Minsk	7.800
(Hungary) Ferencváros	6.455
(Slovakia) Slovan Bratislava	5.815
(Republic of Ireland) Wexford Youths (H)	5.630
(Portugal) CF Benfica	5.465
(Iceland) Breiðablik	5.445
(Faroe Islands) KÍ Klaksvík	3.990
(Israel) Ramat HaSharon	2.640

Seeding position 4
Team	Coeff
(Albania) Vllaznia	1.995
(Wales) Cardiff Met. (H)	1.660
(Latvia) Rīgas FS	1.330
(North Macedonia) ŽFK Dragon 2014	0.990
(Northern Ireland) Newry City	0.990
(Malta) Hibernians	0.665
(Montenegro) Breznica	0.330
(Moldova) ARF Criuleni	0.000
(Kosovo) Hajvalia	—

== Format ==
In each group, teams played against each other in a round-robin mini-tournament at the pre-selected hosts. The nine group winners advanced to the round of 32 to join the 23 teams which qualified directly.

=== Tiebreakers ===
The teams are ranked according to points (3 points for a win, 1 point for a draw, 0 points for a loss). If two or more teams are equal on points on completion of the group matches, the following criteria are applied in the order given to determine the rankings (regulations Articles 14.01 and 14.02):

1. higher number of points obtained in the group matches played among the teams in question;
2. superior goal difference from the group matches played among the teams in question;
3. higher number of goals scored in the group matches played among the teams in question;
4. if, after having applied criteria 1 to 3, teams still have an equal ranking, criteria 1 to 3 are reapplied exclusively to the matches between the teams in question to determine their final rankings. If this procedure does not lead to a decision, criteria 5 to 9 apply;
5. superior goal difference in all group matches;
6. higher number of goals scored in all group matches;
7. if only two teams have the same number of points, and they are tied according to criteria 1 to 6 after having met in the last round of the group, their rankings are determined by a penalty shoot-out (not used if more than two teams have the same number of points, or if their rankings are not relevant for qualification for the next stage).
8. lower disciplinary points total based only on yellow and red cards received in all group matches (red card = 3 points, yellow card = 1 point, expulsion for two yellow cards in one match = 3 points);
9. higher club coefficient.

== Groups ==
All times were CEST (UTC+2).

=== Group 1 ===
Pos	Team	Pld	W	D	L	GF	GA	GD	Pts	Qualification	LIM	PAO	HAJ	KLA
1	(Cyprus) Apollon Limassol (H)	3	2	1	0	9	3	+6	7	Knockout phase	—	—	1–0	5–0
2	(Greece) PAOK	3	0	3	0	5	5	0	3		3–3	—	1–1	—
3	(Kosovo) Hajvalia	3	0	2	1	2	3	−1	2		—	—	—	1–1
4	(Faroe Islands) KÍ Klaksvík	3	0	2	1	2	7	−5	2		—	1–1	—	—

Source: UEFA
(H) Hosts
23 August 2016
15:45

Apollon Limassol (Cyprus)	5–0	(Faroe Islands) KÍ Klaksvík
Molin 44'; Kelly 45+3'; Alborghetti 53' (pen.); Antoniou 72'; Nielsen 90'	Report

Pafiako Stadium, Paphos
Attendance: 150
Referee: Lina Lehtovaara (Finland)
23 August 2016
20:00

PAOK (Greece)	1–1	(Kosovo) Hajvalia
Chatzigiannidou 57'	Report	Bajramaj 15'

Pafiako Stadium, Paphos
Attendance: 70
Referee: Karolina Radzik-Johan (Poland)

25 August 2016
15:45

KÍ Klaksvík (Faroe Islands)	1–1	(Greece) PAOK
Andreasen 51'	Report	Georgiou 16'

Pafiako Stadium, Paphos
Attendance: 50
Referee: Karolina Radzik-Johan (Poland)
25 August 2016
20:00

Apollon Limassol (Cyprus)	1–0	(Kosovo) Hajvalia
Cuschieri 89'	Report

Pafiako Stadium, Paphos
Attendance: 175
Referee: Yuliya Larionova (Azerbaijan)

28 August 2016
16:15

PAOK (Greece)	3–3	(Cyprus) Apollon Limassol
Kynossidou 26' (o.g.); Brame 38'; Dimitrijević 39'	Report	Cuschieri 34'; Nielsen 60', 67'

Tsirion Stadium, Limassol
Attendance: 500
Referee: Lina Lehtovaara (Finland)
28 August 2016
16:15

Hajvalia (Kosovo)	1–1	(Faroe Islands) KÍ Klaksvík
Bajramaj 24'	Report	Andreasen 52'

Pafiako Stadium, Paphos
Attendance: 40
Referee: Yuliya Larionova (Azerbaijan)

=== Group 2 ===
Pos	Team	Pld	W	D	L	GF	GA	GD	Pts	Qualification	MIN	LIE	OSI	DRA
1	(Belarus) FC Minsk	3	3	0	0	17	1	+16	9	Knockout phase	—	—	5–0	—
2	(Belgium) Standard Liège	3	1	1	1	13	4	+9	4		1–3	—	—	11–0
3	(Croatia) Osijek (H)	3	1	1	1	15	7	+8	4		—	1–1	—	14–1
4	(North Macedonia) ŽFK Dragon 2014	3	0	0	3	1	34	−33	0		0–9	—	—	—

Source: UEFA
(H) Hosts
23 August 2016
17:00

Standard Liège (Belgium)	1–3	(Belarus) FC Minsk
Gorniak 88'	Report	Ebi 20' (pen.); Slesarchik 25'; Duben 65'

Stadion Gradski vrt, Osijek
Attendance: 120
Referee: Sofia Karagiorgi (Cyprus)
23 August 2016
20:00

Osijek (Croatia)	14–1	(North Macedonia) ŽFK Dragon 2014
Trpeska 3' (o.g.); Culek 5'; Joščak 14', 28', 38', 83'; Šalek 25', 45+1', 71', 80', 84'; Bojčić 49'; Andrlić 55', 90+1'	Report	Atanasova 76' (pen.)

Stadion Gradski vrt, Osijek
Attendance: 400
Referee: Marta Frias Acedo (Spain)

25 August 2016
17:00

Standard Liège (Belgium)	11–0	(North Macedonia) ŽFK Dragon 2014
Van Eynde 5'; Arsova 8' (o.g.); Schoenmakers 11', 18', 42', 58', 80'; Vanmechelen 53', 82'; Wijnants 68'; Biesmans 73'	Report

Stadion Gradski vrt, Osijek
Attendance: 100
Referee: Maria Marotta (Italy)
25 August 2016
20:00

FC Minsk (Belarus)	5–0	(Croatia) Osijek
Ogbiagbevha 4', 36', 55'; Duben 47', 71'	Report

Stadion Gradski vrt, Osijek
Attendance: 400
Referee: Marta Frias Acedo (Spain)

28 August 2016
17:00

Osijek (Croatia)	1–1	(Belgium) Standard Liège
Kunštek 27'	Report	Gorniak 32'

Stadion Gradski vrt, Osijek
Attendance: 250
Referee: Sofia Karagiorgi (Cyprus)
28 August 2016
17:00

ŽFK Dragon 2014 (North Macedonia)	0–9	(Belarus) FC Minsk
	Report	Yakubu 3', 13', 25', 62', 90'; Ogbiagbevha 19'; Otuwe 33'; Lynko 76'; Ebi 90+2'

Stadion HNK Cibalia, Vinkovci
Attendance: 50
Referee: Maria Marotta (Italy)

=== Group 3 ===
Pos	Team	Pld	W	D	L	GF	GA	GD	Pts	Qualification	BRE	SUB	CAR	SOF
1	(Iceland) Breiðablik	3	2	1	0	14	1	+13	7	Knockout phase	—	—	—	5–0
2	(Serbia) Spartak Subotica	3	2	1	0	6	3	+3	7		1–1	—	3–2	—
3	(Wales) Cardiff Met. (H)	3	1	0	2	6	11	−5	3		0–8	—	—	—
4	(Bulgaria) NSA Sofia	3	0	0	3	0	11	−11	0		—	0–2	0–4	—

Source: UEFA
(H) Hosts
23 August 2016
15:00

NSA Sofia (Bulgaria)	0–4	(Wales) Cardiff Met.
	Report	Sargent 24'; Pinder 64'; Todd 76', 88'

Cyncoed Stadium, Cardiff
Attendance: 243
Referee: Vivian Peeters (Netherlands)
23 August 2016
19:00

Spartak Subotica (Serbia)	1–1	(Iceland) Breiðablik
Quincey 90+2'	Report	Þorvaldsdóttir 69'

Cyncoed Stadium, Cardiff
Attendance: 58
Referee: Zuzana Kováčová (Slovakia)

25 August 2016
15:00

Breiðablik (Iceland)	5–0	(Bulgaria) NSA Sofia
Guðmundsdóttir 34'; Þorvaldsdóttir 40'; Friðriksdóttir 43'; Arnarsdóttir 76'; Magnúsdóttir 90+1'	Report

Cyncoed Stadium, Cardiff
Attendance: 65
Referee: Vivian Peeters (Netherlands)
25 August 2016
19:00

Spartak Subotica (Serbia)	3–2	(Wales) Cardiff Met.
Quincey 44'; Tseng 50'; Filipović 74'	Report	Agg 27', 45+3'

Cyncoed Stadium, Cardiff
Attendance: 357
Referee: Vera Opeykina (Russia)

28 August 2016
15:00

NSA Sofia (Bulgaria)	0–2	(Serbia) Spartak Subotica
	Report	Slović 33'; Quincey 75'

Jenner Park Stadium, Barry
Attendance: 47
Referee: Zuzana Kováčová (Slovakia)
28 August 2016
15:00

Cardiff Met. (Wales)	0–8	(Iceland) Breiðablik
	Report	Guðmundsdóttir 10', 14'; Hönnudóttir 21', 34'; Friðriksdóttir 26' (pen.); Þorvaldsdóttir 30'; Sigurdardóttir 81'; Arnarsdóttir 85'

Cyncoed Stadium, Cardiff
Attendance: 374
Referee: Vera Opeykina (Russia)

=== Group 4 ===
Pos	Team	Pld	W	D	L	GF	GA	GD	Pts	Qualification	KON	CLU	PÄR	BRE
1	(Poland) Medyk Konin (H)	3	3	0	0	13	1	+12	9	Knockout phase	—	3–1	—	9–0
2	(Romania) Olimpia Cluj	3	2	0	1	18	4	+14	6		—	—	7–1	10–0
3	(Estonia) Pärnu JK	3	0	1	2	3	10	−7	1		0–1	—	—	—
4	(Montenegro) Breznica	3	0	1	2	2	21	−19	1		—	—	2–2	—

Source: UEFA
(H) Hosts
23 August 2016
11:00

Olimpia Cluj (Romania)	7–1	(Estonia) Pärnu JK
Popa 3', 7', 45'; Vătafu 21'; Voicu 39'; Lunca 50', 60'	Report	Morkovkina 37'

Stadion im. Złotej Jedenastki, Konin
Attendance: 50
Referee: Marte Sørø (Norway)
23 August 2016
18:00

Medyk Konin (Poland)	9–0	(Montenegro) Breznica
Dudek 18'; Gawrońska 44'; Daleszczyk 45+4', 61', 66'; Sikora 62', 84', 90'; Kostova 71'	Report

Stadion im. Złotej Jedenastki, Konin
Attendance: 300
Referee: Julia-Stefanie Baier (Austria)

25 August 2016
11:00

Olimpia Cluj (Romania)	10–0	(Montenegro) Breznica
Popa 9', 11', 44'; Lunca 21', 26', 28', 41'; Vătafu 29', 83' (pen.); Bâtea 76'	Report

Stadion im. Złotej Jedenastki, Konin
Attendance: 50
Referee: Elvira Nurmustafina (Kazakhstan)
25 August 2016
18:00

Pärnu JK (Estonia)	0–1	(Poland) Medyk Konin
	Report	Sikora 19'

Stadion im. Złotej Jedenastki, Konin
Attendance: 400
Referee: Julia-Stefanie Baier (Austria)

28 August 2016
17:00

Medyk Konin (Poland)	3–1	(Romania) Olimpia Cluj
Sikora 26'; Daleszczyk 49', 89'	Report	Lunca 90'

Stadion im. Złotej Jedenastki, Konin
Attendance: 600
Referee: Marte Sørø (Norway)
28 August 2016
17:00

Breznica (Montenegro)	2–2	(Estonia) Pärnu JK
Jankov 8', 38'	Report	Shcherbachenia 49'; Morkovkina 86'

Stadion Miejski we Wrześni, Września
Attendance: 280
Referee: Elvira Nurmustafina (Kazakhstan)

=== Group 5 ===
Pos	Team	Pld	W	D	L	GF	GA	GD	Pts	Qualification	ZÜR	POM	BRA	VLL
1	(Switzerland) Zürich	3	3	0	0	11	1	+10	9	Knockout phase	—	—	3–1	3–0
2	(Slovenia) Pomurje (H)	3	2	0	1	10	8	+2	6		0–5	—	—	6–1
3	(Slovakia) Slovan Bratislava	3	1	0	2	5	8	−3	3		—	2–4	—	—
4	(Albania) Vllaznia	3	0	0	3	2	11	−9	0		—	—	1–2	—

Source: UEFA
(H) Hosts
23 August 2016
16:30

Zürich (Switzerland)	3–1	(Slovakia) Slovan Bratislava
Kuster 20'; Willi 48'; Humm 53'	Report	Hollá 84'

Beltinci Sports Park, Beltinci
Attendance: 30
Referee: Lorraine Clark (Scotland)
23 August 2016
20:30

Pomurje (Slovenia)	6–1	(Albania) Vllaznia
Kolbl 52'; Tibaut 65'; Rogan 69', 89'; Makovec 76'; Rozmarič 90+1'	Report	Jashari 44'

Lendava Sports Park, Lendava
Attendance: 420
Referee: Ana Minić (Serbia)

25 August 2016
16:30

Zürich (Switzerland)	3–0	(Albania) Vllaznia
Willi 6' (pen.), 87'; Piubel 85'	Report

Beltinci Sports Park, Beltinci
Attendance: 34
Referee: Olga Tereshko (Belarus)
25 August 2016
20:30

Slovan Bratislava (Slovakia)	2–4	(Slovenia) Pomurje
Šurnovská 9'; Kovaľová 76'	Report	Kos 11'; Conjar 17'; Tibaut 80'; Kolbl 85'

Lendava Sports Park, Lendava
Attendance: 380
Referee: Ana Minić (Serbia)

28 August 2016
16:30

Vllaznia (Albania)	1–2	(Slovakia) Slovan Bratislava
Doci 62'	Report	Švecová 17'; Šurnovská 37'

Lendava Sports Park, Lendava
Attendance: 30
Referee: Olga Tereshko (Belarus)
28 August 2016
16:30

Pomurje (Slovenia)	0–5	(Switzerland) Zürich
	Report	Humm 30', 44'; Willi 40'; Franssi 60'; 8Mauron 70'

Beltinci Sports Park, Beltinci
Attendance: 687
Referee: Lorraine Clark (Scotland)

=== Group 6 ===
Pos	Team	Pld	W	D	L	GF	GA	GD	Pts	Qualification	SFK	HaS	KHA	RIG
1	(Bosnia and Herzegovina) SFK 2000 (H)	3	2	1	0	6	2	+4	7	Knockout phase	—	1–0	—	3–0
2	(Israel) Ramat HaSharon	3	2	0	1	5	1	+4	6		—	—	1–0	—
3	(Ukraine) Zhytlobud Kharkiv	3	1	1	1	4	3	+1	4		2–2	—	—	2–0
4	(Latvia) Rīgas FS	3	0	0	3	0	9	−9	0		—	0–4	—	—

Source: UEFA
(H) Hosts
23 August 2016
11:00

SFK 2000 (Bosnia and Herzegovina)	1–0	(Israel) Ramat HaSharon
Kuč 88'	Report

Stadion Otoka, Sarajevo
Attendance: 200
Referee: Esther Azzopardi (Malta)
23 August 2016
17:00

Zhytlobud Kharkiv (Ukraine)	2–0	(Latvia) Rīgas FS
Melkonyants 32'; Ieromenko 45'	Report

Stadion Otoka, Sarajevo
Attendance: 30
Referee: Zuzana Valentová (Slovakia)

25 August 2016
11:00

Ramat HaSharon (Israel)	1–0	(Ukraine) Zhytlobud Kharkiv
Murnan 72'	Report

Stadion Otoka, Sarajevo
Attendance: 25
Referee: Zuzana Valentová (Slovakia)
25 August 2016
17:00

SFK 2000 (Bosnia and Herzegovina)	3–0	(Latvia) Rīgas FS
Kuč 11', 27'; Hasanbegović 90+2'	Report

Stadion Otoka, Sarajevo
Attendance: 250
Referee: Marta Huerta De Aza (Spain)

28 August 2016
17:00

Zhytlobud Kharkiv (Ukraine)	2–2	(Bosnia and Herzegovina) SFK 2000
Tykhonova 38', 66'	Report	Medić 54'; Kostyuchenko 62' (o.g.)

Asim Ferhatović Hase Stadium, Sarajevo
Attendance: 250
Referee: Esther Azzopardi (Malta)
28 August 2016
17:00

Rīgas FS (Latvia)	0–4	(Israel) Ramat HaSharon
	Report	Shahaf 14'; Murnan 53'; Shimrich 81'; Tvill 88' (pen.)

Stadion Otoka, Sarajevo
Attendance: 50
Referee: Marta Huerta De Aza (Spain)

=== Group 7 ===
Pos	Team	Pld	W	D	L	GF	GA	GD	Pts	Qualification	KAZ	GIN	WEX	CRI
1	(Kazakhstan) BIIK Kazygurt	3	3	0	0	9	1	+8	9	Knockout phase	—	—	3–1	3–0
2	(Lithuania) Gintra Universitetas	3	2	0	1	15	4	+11	6		0–3	—	—	13–0
3	(Republic of Ireland) Wexford Youths (H)	3	0	1	2	2	5	−3	1		—	1–2	—	—
4	(Moldova) ARF Criuleni	3	0	1	2	0	16	−16	1		—	—	0–0	—

Source: UEFA
(H) Hosts
23 August 2016
15:00

Gintra Universitetas (Lithuania)	13–0	(Moldova) ARF Criuleni
Kozyrenko 9', 17', 32', 60'; Coleman 12', 89'; Alekperova 25' (pen.); Veličkaitė 29', 72', 88'; Gailevičiūtė 41', 70'; Vaitukaitytė 81'	Report

Waterford Regional Sports Centre, Waterford
Attendance: 20
Referee: Eleni Antoniou (Greece)
23 August 2016
20:00

BIIK Kazygurt (Kazakhstan)	3–1	(Republic of Ireland) Wexford Youths
Gabelia 1'; Adule 14'; Litvinenko 44'	Report	O'Riordan 54'

Ferrycarrig Park, Wexford
Attendance: 613
Referee: Florence Guillemin (France)

25 August 2016
15:00

BIIK Kazygurt (Kazakhstan)	3–0	(Moldova) ARF Criuleni
Gabelia 3', 72'; Bortnikova 18'	Report

Waterford Regional Sports Centre, Waterford
Attendance: 10
Referee: Désirée Grundbacher (Switzerland)
25 August 2016
20:00

Wexford Youths (Republic of Ireland)	1–2	(Lithuania) Gintra Universitetas
Dwyer 62'	Report	Gailevičiūtė 9'; Kozyrenko 90+1'

Ferrycarrig Park, Wexford
Attendance: 670
Referee: Eleni Antoniou (Greece)

28 August 2016
15:00

Gintra Universitetas (Lithuania)	0–3	(Kazakhstan) BIIK Kazygurt
	Report	Adule 7'; Litvinenko 44'; Gabelia 82'

Waterford Regional Sports Centre, Waterford
Attendance: 65
Referee: Florence Guillemin (France)
28 August 2016
15:00

ARF Criuleni (Moldova)	0–0	(Republic of Ireland) Wexford Youths
	Report

Ferrycarrig Park, Wexford
Attendance: 560
Referee: Désirée Grundbacher (Switzerland)

=== Group 8 ===
Pos	Team	Pld	W	D	L	GF	GA	GD	Pts	Qualification	AVA	BEN	VAN	NEW
1	(Norway) Avaldsnes IL	3	3	0	0	19	1	+18	9	Knockout phase	—	—	2–0	11–0
2	(Portugal) CF Benfica	3	2	0	1	8	7	+1	6		1–6	—	—	—
3	(Finland) PK-35 Vantaa (H)	3	1	0	2	3	4	−1	3		—	1–2	—	2–0
4	(Northern Ireland) Newry City	3	0	0	3	0	18	−18	0		—	0–5	—	—

Source: UEFA
(H) Hosts
23 August 2016
13:00

Avaldsnes IL (Norway)	11–0	(Northern Ireland) Newry City
Andréia Rosa 22'; Mjelde 26'; Hansen 44', 46', 48'; Pedersen 52', 54', 70', 90'; Thorsnes 63'; Santos 64'	Report

Myyrmäen jalkapallostadion, Vantaa
Attendance: 63
Referee: Kateryna Zora (Ukraine)
23 August 2016
17:30

PK-35 Vantaa (Finland)	1–2	(Portugal) CF Benfica
Ojanperä 17'	Report	Silvia 69'; Nurmela 87' (o.g.)

Myyrmäen jalkapallostadion, Vantaa
Attendance: 913
Referee: Petra Chudá (Slovakia)

25 August 2016
13:00

CF Benfica (Portugal)	1–6	(Norway) Avaldsnes IL
Mafalda 18'	Report	Magnúsdóttir 2', 9'; Hansen 12', 41'; Benites 68'; Thorsnes 75'

Myyrmäen jalkapallostadion, Vantaa
Attendance: 53
Referee: Kateryna Zora (Ukraine)
25 August 2016
17:30

PK-35 Vantaa (Finland)	2–0	(Northern Ireland) Newry City
Ikonen 10'; Parikka 80'	Report

Myyrmäen jalkapallostadion, Vantaa
Attendance: 302
Referee: Dimitrina Milkova (Bulgaria)

28 August 2016
10:00

Avaldsnes IL (Norway)	2–0	(Finland) PK-35 Vantaa
Thorsnes 24'; Magnúsdóttir 36'	Report

Myyrmäen jalkapallostadion, Vantaa
Attendance: 452
Referee: Petra Chudá (Slovakia)
28 August 2016
10:00

Newry City (Northern Ireland)	0–5	(Portugal) CF Benfica
	Report	Flores 15'; Coelho 27'; Mafalda 30'; McAllister 52' (o.g.); Redpath 82' (o.g.)

Sonera Stadium, Helsinki
Attendance: 22
Referee: Dimitrina Milkova (Bulgaria)

=== Group 9 ===
Pos	Team	Pld	W	D	L	GF	GA	GD	Pts	Qualification	TWE	FER	KON	HIB
1	(Netherlands) Twente (H)	3	3	0	0	17	3	+14	9	Knockout phase	—	2–1	—	9–0
2	(Hungary) Ferencváros	3	2	0	1	7	2	+5	6		—	—	2–0	—
3	(Turkey) Konak Belediyespor	3	1	0	2	7	8	−1	3		2–6	—	—	5–0
4	(Malta) Hibernians	3	0	0	3	0	18	−18	0		—	0–4	—	—

Source: UEFA
(H) Hosts
23 August 2016
18:30

Twente (Netherlands)	2–1	(Hungary) Ferencváros
R. Jansen 21'; E. Jansen 34'	Report	Zlidnis 55'

Sportpark De Peuverweide, Geesteren
Attendance: 650
Referee: Eleni Lampadariou (Greece)
23 August 2016
18:30

Konak Belediyespor (Turkey)	5–0	(Malta) Hibernians
Dușa 7'; Başkol 13'; Çınar 38'; Nurlu 50'; Erol 51'	Report

Sportpark Vondersweijde, Oldenzaal
Attendance: 100
Referee: Barbara Poxhofer (Austria)

25 August 2016
18:30

Twente (Netherlands)	9–0	(Malta) Hibernians
E. Jansen 26', 90+3'; Erman 31'; Tonna 45' (o.g.); Beerensteyn 59', 61', 84'; Waldus 82'; Ellouzi 88'	Report

Sportpark De Peuverweide, Geesteren
Attendance: 475
Referee: Tess Olofsson (Sweden)
25 August 2016
18:30

Ferencváros (Hungary)	2–0	(Turkey) Konak Belediyespor
Nagy 70'; Fenyvesi 82'	Report

Sportpark Vondersweijde, Oldenzaal
Attendance: 110
Referee: Barbara Poxhofer (Austria)

28 August 2016
15:30

Konak Belediyespor (Turkey)	2–6	(Netherlands) Twente
Dușa 6'; Sârghe 43'	Report	R. Jansen 15', 23', 47'; Beerensteyn 33'; Kerkdijk 77'; Ellouzi 89'

Sportpark Vondersweijde, Oldenzaal
Attendance: 600
Referee: Eleni Lampadariou (Greece)
28 August 2016
15:30

Hibernians (Malta)	0–4	(Hungary) Ferencváros
	Report	Orji 5', 63'; Bulatović 31'; Čanković 44' (pen.)

Sportpark De Peuverweide, Geesteren
Attendance: 10
Referee: Tess Olofsson (Sweden)
