= 2018–19 UEFA Women's Champions League =

18th edition of the European women's club football championship organized by UEFA

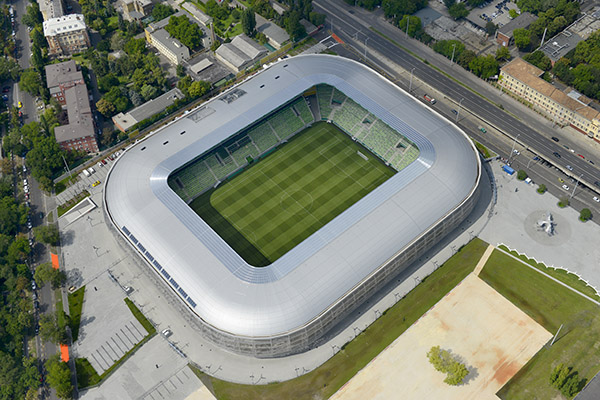
- The Groupama Arena in Budapest hosted the final.

Tournament details
- Dates: Qualifying round: 7–13 August 2018; Knockout phase: 12 September 2018 – 18 May 2019
- Teams: Knockout phase: 32; Total: 60 (from 48 associations)

Final positions
- Champions: (France) Lyon (6th title)
- Runners-up: (Spain) Barcelona

Tournament statistics
- Matches played: 121
- Goals scored: 471 (3.89 per match)
- Attendance: 191,931 (1,586 per match)
- Top scorer(s): (Denmark) Pernille Harder; 8 goals

The 2018–19 UEFA Women's Champions League was the 18th edition of the European women's club football championship organised by UEFA, and the 10th edition since being rebranded as the UEFA Women's Champions League.

The final was held at the Groupama Arena in Budapest, Hungary. This was the first time since the final was played as a single match that a host city for the Women's Champions League final was not automatically assigned by which city won the bid to host the men's Champions League final.

Lyon were the defending champions and won the final against Barcelona 4–1, to win their sixth overall and fourth straight title.

== Association team allocation ==
A maximum of 68 teams from 55 UEFA member associations were eligible to participate in the 2018–19 UEFA Women's Champions League. The association ranking based on the UEFA league coefficient for women was used to determine the number of participating teams for each association:

- Associations 1–12 each had two teams qualify.
- All other associations, should they enter, each had one team qualify.
- The winners of the 2017–18 UEFA Women's Champions League were given an additional entry if they did not qualify for the 2018–19 UEFA Women's Champions League through their domestic league.

=== Association ranking ===
For the 2018–19 UEFA Women's Champions League, the associations were allocated places according to their 2017 UEFA league coefficients for women, which took into account their performance in European competitions from 2012–13 to 2016–17.

For the first time Switzerland had two entries, replacing Scotland in the top 12 associations.

Association ranking for 2018–19 UEFA Women's Champions League

Rank	Association	Coeff.	Teams
1	Germany	86.000	2
2	France	80.000	2
3	Sweden	61.500	2
4	England	53.000	2
5	Spain	44.000	2
6	Denmark	38.500	2
7	Italy	37.000	2
8	Russia	35.500	2
9	Switzerland	33.000	2
10	Czech Republic	33.000	2
11	Austria	28.000	2
12	Norway	27.500	2
13	Scotland	26.000	1
14	Netherlands	25.000	1
15	Kazakhstan	21.000	1
16	Poland	20.000	1
17	Cyprus	18.000	1
18	Iceland	17.000	1
19	Serbia	15.500	1

Rank	Association	Coeff.	Teams
20	Romania	15.000	1
21	Hungary	14.000	1
22	Belgium	13.500	1
23	Bosnia and Herzegovina	13.000	1
24	Lithuania	12.000	1
25	Turkey	12.000	1
26	Slovenia	11.000	1
27	Finland	11.000	1
28	Portugal	10.500	1
29	Belarus	10.000	1
30	Ukraine	9.500	1
31	Greece	8.500	1
32	Republic of Ireland	8.500	1
33	Croatia	7.500	1
34	Israel	7.000	1
35	Estonia	5.500	1
36	Bulgaria	5.000	1
37	Slovakia	4.500	1

Rank	Association	Coeff.	Teams
38	Faroe Islands	3.000	1
39	Northern Ireland	3.000	1
40	Wales	2.000	1
41	Montenegro	1.500	1
42	Albania	1.500	1
43	Kosovo	1.000	1
44	Latvia	1.000	1
45	Macedonia	1.000	1
46	Moldova	0.500	1
47	Malta	0.500	1
48	Luxembourg	0.000	DNE
NR	Andorra	—	DNE
NR	Armenia	—	DNE
NR	Azerbaijan	—	DNE
NR	Georgia	—	1
NR	Gibraltar	—	DNE
NR	Liechtenstein	—	DNE
NR	San Marino	—	DNE

Notes

- TH – Additional berth for title holders
- NR – No rank (association did not enter in any of the seasons used for computing coefficients)
- DNE – Did not enter

=== Distribution ===
The format of the competition remained unchanged from previous years, starting from the qualifying round (played as mini-tournaments with four teams in each group), followed by the knockout phase starting from the round of 32 (played as home-and-away two-legged ties except for the one-match final).

Unlike the men's Champions League, not every association entered a team, and so the exact number of teams entering in each round (qualifying round and round of 32) could not be determined until the full entry list was known. In general, the title holders, the champions of the top 12 associations, and the runners-up of highest-ranked associations (exact number depending on the number of entries) received a bye to the round of 32. All other teams (runners-up of lowest-ranked associations and champions of associations starting from 13th) entered the qualifying round, with the group winners and a maximum of two best runners-up advancing to the round of 32.

=== Teams ===
A total of 60 teams from 48 associations entered the competition, with the entries confirmed by UEFA on 8 June 2018. An association must have an eleven-a-side women's domestic league (or in special circumstances, a women's domestic cup) to enter a team. Among the entrants:

- 20 teams entered the round of 32: the champions and runners-up from associations 1–8 (including title holders Lyon) and the champions from associations 9–12.
- 40 teams entered the qualifying round: the runners-up from associations 9–12 and the champions from the 36 associations ranked 13 or lower.

As KÍ Klaksvík failed to win the Faroe Islands league, their streak of having participated in every edition of the UEFA Women's Cup/Champions League have ended after 17 seasons.

Legend

- TH: Women's Champions League title holders
- CH: Domestic league champions
- RU: Domestic league runners-up

Qualified teams for 2018–19 UEFA Women's Champions League
Entry round	Teams			
Round of 32	(Germany) VfL Wolfsburg (CH)	(Germany) Bayern Munich (RU)	(France) Lyon (CH)^{TH}	(France) Paris Saint-Germain (RU)
Round of 32	(Sweden) Linköping (CH)	(Sweden) Rosengård (RU)	(England) Chelsea (CH)	(England) Manchester City (RU)
Round of 32	(Spain) Atlético Madrid (CH)	(Spain) Barcelona (RU)	(Denmark) Fortuna Hjørring (CH)	(Denmark) Brøndby (RU)
Round of 32	(Italy) Juventus (CH)	(Italy) Fiorentina (3rd)	(Russia) Zvezda-2005 Perm (CH)	(Russia) Ryazan-VDV (RU)
Round of 32	(Switzerland) Zürich (CH)	(Czech Republic) Sparta Praha (CH)	(Austria) St. Pölten (CH)	(Norway) LSK Kvinner (CH)
Qualifying round	(Switzerland) Basel (RU)	(Czech Republic) Slavia Praha (RU)	(Austria) Landhaus Wien (RU)	(Norway) Avaldsnes (RU)
Qualifying round	(Scotland) Glasgow City (CH)	(Netherlands) Ajax (CH)	(Kazakhstan) BIIK Kazygurt (CH)	(Poland) Górnik Łęczna (CH)
Qualifying round	(Cyprus) Barcelona FA (CH)	(Iceland) Þór/KA (CH)	(Serbia) Spartak Subotica (CH)	(Romania) Olimpia Cluj (CH)
Qualifying round	(Hungary) MTK Hungária (CH)	(Belgium) Anderlecht (CH)	(Bosnia and Herzegovina) SFK 2000 (CH)	(Lithuania) Gintra Universitetas (CH)
Qualifying round	(Turkey) Ataşehir Belediyespor (CH)	(Slovenia) Olimpija Ljubljana (CH)	(Finland) Honka (CH)	(Portugal) Sporting CP (CH)
Qualifying round	(Belarus) FC Minsk (CH)	(Ukraine) Zhytlobud-1 Kharkiv (CH)	(Greece) Elpides Karditsas (RU)	(Republic of Ireland) Wexford Youths (CH)
Qualifying round	(Croatia) Osijek (CH)	(Israel) Kiryat Gat (CH)	(Estonia) Pärnu (CH)	(Bulgaria) NSA Sofia (CH)
Qualifying round	(Slovakia) Slovan Bratislava (CH)	(Faroe Islands) EB/Streymur/Skála (CH)	(Northern Ireland) Linfield (CH)	(Wales) Cardiff Met. (CH)
Qualifying round	(Montenegro) Breznica Pljevlja (CH)	(Albania) Vllaznia (CH)	(Kosovo) Mitrovica (CH)	(Latvia) Rīgas FS (CH)
Qualifying round	(North Macedonia) Dragon 2014 (CH)	(Moldova) Agarista-ȘS Anenii Noi (CH)	(Malta) Birkirkara (CH)	(Georgia (country)) Martve (CH)

Notes

1. Greece (GRE): The Greek champions PAOK were banned from entering by UEFA, and so the berth was given to the runners-up Elpides Karditsas.
2. Italy (ITA): The Italian runners-up Brescia were bought by Milan after the season, and lost the right to enter the competition. Since Tavagnacco and Fiorentina finished tied on points in third place, and a play-off was played on 16 June 2018. Fiorentina won 3–0.
3. Moldova (MDA): Agarista-ȘS Anenii Noi were the league leaders at the entry deadline, and were confirmed as Moldovan champions afterwards.

== Round and draw dates ==
UEFA has scheduled the competition as follows (all draws were held at the UEFA headquarters in Nyon, Switzerland).

Schedule for 2018–19 UEFA Women's Champions League
Round	Draw	First leg	Second leg
Qualifying round	22 June 2018	7–13 August 2018	
Round of 32	17 August 2018	12–13 September 2018	26–27 September 2018
Round of 16	1 October 2018	17–18 October 2018	31 October – 1 November 2018
Quarter-finals	9 November 2018	20–21 March 2019	27–28 March 2019
Semi-finals	9 November 2018	20–21 April 2019	27–28 April 2019
Final	9 November 2018	18 May 2019 at Groupama Arena, Budapest	

== Qualifying round ==
The draw of the qualifying round was held at the UEFA headquarters in Nyon, Switzerland on 22 June 2018, 13:30 CEST. The teams were allocated into four seeding positions based on their UEFA club coefficients at the beginning of the season. They were drawn into groups of four containing one team from each of the four seeding positions. First, the teams which were pre-selected as hosts were drawn from their own designated pot and allocated to their respective group as per their seeding positions. Next, the remaining teams were drawn from their respective pot which were allocated according to their seeding positions. In each group, teams played against each other in a round-robin mini-tournament at the pre-selected hosts. The group winners and the two runners-up with the best record against the teams finishing first and third in their group advanced to the round of 32 to join the 20 teams which received a bye. The matches were played on 7, 10 and 13 August 2018.

Tiebreakers

Teams are ranked according to points (3 points for a win, 1 point for a draw, 0 points for a loss), and if tied on points, the following tiebreaking criteria are applied, in the order given, to determine the rankings (Regulations Articles 14.01 and 14.02):

1. Points in head-to-head matches among tied teams;
2. Goal difference in head-to-head matches among tied teams;
3. Goals scored in head-to-head matches among tied teams;
4. If more than two teams are tied, and after applying all head-to-head criteria above, a subset of teams are still tied, all head-to-head criteria above are reapplied exclusively to this subset of teams;
5. Goal difference in all group matches;
6. Goals scored in all group matches;
7. Penalty shoot-out if only two teams have the same number of points, and they met in the last round of the group and are tied after applying all criteria above (not used if more than two teams have the same number of points, or if their rankings are not relevant for qualification for the next stage);
8. Disciplinary points (red card = 3 points, yellow card = 1 point, expulsion for two yellow cards in one match = 3 points);
9. UEFA club coefficient.

To determine the best runners-up, the results against the teams in fourth place are discarded. The following criteria are applied (Regulations Article 14.03):

1. Points;
2. Goal difference;
3. Goals scored;
4. Disciplinary points;
5. UEFA club coefficient.

=== Group 1 ===
Pos	Team	Pld	W	D	L	GF	GA	GD	Pts	Qualification	AJA	ÞKA	WEX	LIN
1	(Netherlands) Ajax	3	2	1	0	6	1	+5	7	Round of 32	—	—	4–1	2–0
2	(Iceland) Þór/KA	3	2	1	0	5	0	+5	7	Round of 32	0–0	—	—	2–0
3	(Republic of Ireland) Wexford Youths	3	1	0	2	4	9	−5	3		—	0–3	—	—
4	(Northern Ireland) Linfield (H)	3	0	0	3	2	7	−5	0		—	—	2–3	—

Source: UEFA
(H) Hosts

=== Group 2 ===
Pos	Team	Pld	W	D	L	GF	GA	GD	Pts	Qualification	BAR	MIN	SLO	LJU
1	(Cyprus) Barcelona FA	3	3	0	0	10	0	+10	9	Round of 32	—	2–0	2–0	—
2	(Belarus) FC Minsk	3	2	0	1	7	2	+5	6		—	—	1–0	6–0
3	(Slovakia) Slovan Bratislava	3	1	0	2	1	3	−2	3		—	—	—	1–0
4	(Slovenia) Olimpija Ljubljana (H)	3	0	0	3	0	13	−13	0		0–6	—	—	—

Source: UEFA
(H) Hosts

=== Group 3 ===
Pos	Team	Pld	W	D	L	GF	GA	GD	Pts	Qualification	GLA	AND	GÓR	MAR
1	(Scotland) Glasgow City (H)	3	2	0	1	10	2	+8	6 (Note: Head-to-head results: Glasgow City 1–2 Anderlecht, Anderlecht 0–1 Górnik Łęczna, Górnik Łęczna 0–2 Glasgow City. Head-to-head standings: Glasgow City: 3 pts, +1 GD (3 GF, 2 GA); Anderlecht: 3 pts, 0 GD (2 GF, 2 GA); Górnik Łęczna: 3 pts, −1 GD (1 GF, 2 GA))	Round of 32	—	1–2	—	7–0
2	(Belgium) Anderlecht	3	2	0	1	12	2	+10	6		—	—	0–1	—
3	(Poland) Górnik Łęczna	3	2	0	1	13	2	+11	6		0–2	—	—	12–0
4	(Georgia (country)) Martve	3	0	0	3	0	29	−29	0		—	0–10	—	—

Source: UEFA
(H) Hosts

=== Group 4 ===
Pos	Team	Pld	W	D	L	GF	GA	GD	Pts	Qualification	SLA	MTK	ATA	MIT
1	(Czech Republic) Slavia Praha	3	3	0	0	15	3	+12	9	Round of 32	—	—	7–2	4–0
2	(Hungary) MTK Hungária (H)	3	1	1	1	9	7	+2	4		1–4	—	—	6–1
3	(Turkey) Ataşehir Belediyespor	3	1	1	1	10	10	0	4		—	2–2	—	—
4	(Kosovo) Mitrovica	3	0	0	3	2	16	−14	0		—	—	1–6	—

Source: UEFA
(H) Hosts

=== Group 5 ===
Pos	Team	Pld	W	D	L	GF	GA	GD	Pts	Qualification	SUB	BAS	KIR	BRE
1	(Serbia) Spartak Subotica	3	3	0	0	10	0	+10	9	Round of 32	—	—	1–0	4–0
2	(Switzerland) Basel	3	2	0	1	7	5	+2	6		0–5	—	—	4–0
3	(Israel) Kiryat Gat	3	0	1	2	4	8	−4	1		—	0–3	—	—
4	(Montenegro) Breznica Pljevlja (H)	3	0	1	2	4	12	−8	1		—	—	4–4	—

Source: UEFA
(H) Hosts

=== Group 6 ===
Pos	Team	Pld	W	D	L	GF	GA	GD	Pts	Qualification	KHA	CLU	CAR	BIR
1	(Ukraine) Zhytlobud-1 Kharkiv (H)	3	3	0	0	16	3	+13	9	Round of 32	—	3–1	—	8–0
2	(Romania) Olimpia Cluj	3	2	0	1	10	6	+4	6		—	—	3–2	6–1
3	(Wales) Cardiff Met.	3	0	1	2	6	10	−4	1		2–5	—	—	—
4	(Malta) Birkirkara	3	0	1	2	3	16	−13	1		—	—	2–2	—

Source: UEFA
(H) Hosts

=== Group 7 ===
Pos	Team	Pld	W	D	L	GF	GA	GD	Pts	Qualification	BII	KAR	WIE	RIG
1	(Kazakhstan) BIIK Kazygurt	3	3	0	0	9	1	+8	9	Round of 32	—	2–1	—	5–0
2	(Greece) Elpides Karditsas	3	2	0	1	6	4	+2	6		—	—	3–1	—
3	(Austria) Landhaus Wien	3	1	0	2	3	6	−3	3		0–2	—	—	2–1
4	(Latvia) Rīgas FS (H)	3	0	0	3	2	9	−7	0		—	1–2	—	—

Source: UEFA
(H) Hosts

=== Group 8 ===
Pos	Team	Pld	W	D	L	GF	GA	GD	Pts	Qualification	SFK	VLL	PÄR	ANE
1	(Bosnia and Herzegovina) SFK 2000 (H)	3	3	0	0	12	1	+11	9	Round of 32	—	5–0	—	5–0
2	(Albania) Vllaznia	3	2	0	1	7	7	0	6		—	—	3–1	—
3	(Estonia) Pärnu	3	1	0	2	4	5	−1	3		1–2	—	—	2–0
4	(Moldova) Agarista-ȘS Anenii Noi	3	0	0	3	1	11	−10	0		—	1–4	—	—

Source: UEFA
(H) Hosts

=== Group 9 ===
Pos	Team	Pld	W	D	L	GF	GA	GD	Pts	Qualification	GIN	HON	SOF	EBS
1	(Lithuania) Gintra Universitetas (H)	3	2	1	0	17	1	+16	7	Round of 32	—	1–1	—	7–0
2	(Finland) Honka	3	2	1	0	13	1	+12	7	Round of 32	—	—	5–0	—
3	(Bulgaria) NSA Sofia	3	1	0	2	3	14	−11	3		0–9	—	—	3–0
4	(Faroe Islands) EB/Streymur/Skála	3	0	0	3	0	17	−17	0		—	0–7	—	—

Source: UEFA
(H) Hosts

=== Group 10 ===
Pos	Team	Pld	W	D	L	GF	GA	GD	Pts	Qualification	AVA	SPO	OSI	DRA
1	(Norway) Avaldsnes	3	2	1	0	8	4	+4	7	Round of 32	—	3–2	—	3–0
2	(Portugal) Sporting CP	3	2	0	1	9	3	+6	6		—	—	3–0	—
3	(Croatia) Osijek (H)	3	1	1	1	15	5	+10	4		2–2	—	—	13–0
4	(North Macedonia) Dragon 2014	3	0	0	3	0	20	−20	0		—	0–4	—	—

Source: UEFA
(H) Hosts

=== Ranking of second-placed teams ===
To determine the best two second-placed teams from the qualifying round which advanced to the knockout phase, only the results of the second-placed teams against the first and third-placed teams in their group were taken into account, while results against the fourth-placed team not included. As a result, two matches played by each second-placed team counts for the purposes of determining the ranking.

Pos	Grp	Team	Pld	W	D	L	GF	GA	GD	Pts	Qualification
1	9	(Finland) Honka	2	1	1	0	6	1	+5	4	Round of 32
2	1	(Iceland) Þór/KA	2	1	1	0	3	0	+3	4	Round of 32
3	10	(Portugal) Sporting CP	2	1	0	1	5	3	+2	3	
4	7	(Greece) Elpides Karditsas	2	1	0	1	4	3	+1	3	
5	3	(Belgium) Anderlecht	2	1	0	1	2	2	0	3	
6	6	(Romania) Olimpia Cluj	2	1	0	1	4	5	−1	3	
7	2	(Belarus) FC Minsk	2	1	0	1	1	2	−1	3	
8	5	(Switzerland) Basel	2	1	0	1	3	5	−2	3	
9	8	(Albania) Vllaznia Shkodër	2	1	0	1	3	6	−3	3	
10	4	(Hungary) MTK Hungária	2	0	1	1	3	6	−3	1	

Source: UEFA

== Knockout phase ==
Each tie in the knockout phase, apart from the final, was played over two legs, with each team playing one leg at home. The team that scores more goals on aggregate over the two legs advanced to the next round. If the aggregate score was level, the away goals rule was applied, i.e. the team that scored more goals away from home over the two legs advanced. If away goals were also equal, then extra time was played. The away goals rule was again applied after extra time, i.e. if there were goals scored during extra time and the aggregate score was still level, the visiting team advanced by virtue of more away goals scored. If no goals were scored during extra time, the tie was decided by penalty shoot-out. In the final, which was played as a single match, if the score was level at the end of normal time, extra time was played, followed by penalty shoot-out if the score remained tied.

The mechanism of the draws for each round is as follows:

- In the draw for the round of 32, the sixteen teams with the highest UEFA club coefficients were seeded (with the title holders being the automatic top seed), and the other sixteen teams were unseeded. The seeded teams were drawn against the unseeded teams, with the seeded teams hosting the second leg. Teams from the same association or the same qualifying round group could not be drawn against each other.
- In the draw for the round of 16, the eight teams with the highest UEFA club coefficients were seeded (with the title holders being the automatic top seed should they qualify), and the other eight teams were unseeded. The seeded teams were drawn against the unseeded teams, with the order of legs decided by draw. Teams from the same association could not be drawn against each other.
- In the draws for the quarter-finals and semi-finals, there was no seeding, and teams from the same association could be drawn against each other. As the draws for the quarter-finals and semi-finals were held together before the quarter-finals were played, the identity of the quarter-final winners was not known at the time of the semi-final draw. A draw was also held to determine which semi-final winner was designated as the "home" team for the final (for administrative purposes as it is played at a neutral venue).

=== Bracket ===
Round of 32
(Netherlands) Ajax	2	2	4
(Czech Republic) Sparta Praha	0	1	1
(Norway) Avaldsnes	0	0	0
(France) Lyon	2	5	7
(Iceland) Þór/KA	0	0	0
(Germany) VfL Wolfsburg	1	2	3
(Spain) Atlético Madrid	1	2	3
(England) Manchester City	1	0	1
(Bosnia and Herzegovina) SFK 2000	0	0	0
(England) Chelsea	5	6	11
(Italy) Fiorentina	2	2	4
(Denmark) Fortuna Hjørring	0	0	0
(Ukraine) Zhytlobud-1 Kharkiv	1	0	1
(Sweden) Linköping	6	4	10
(Austria) St. Pölten	1	0	1
(France) Paris Saint-Germain	4	2	6
(Russia) Ryazan-VDV	0	0	0
(Sweden) Rosengård	1	2	3
(Lithuania) Gintra Universitetas	0	0	0
(Czech Republic) Slavia Praha	3	4	7
(Finland) Honka	0	1	1
(Switzerland) Zürich	1	5	6
(Serbia) Spartak Subotica	0	0	0
(Germany) Bayern Munich	7	4	11
(Kazakhstan) BIIK Kazygurt	3	0	3
(Spain) Barcelona	1	3	4
(Cyprus) Barcelona FA	0	1	1
(Scotland) Glasgow City	2	0	2
(Norway) LSK Kvinner	3	1	4
(Russia) Zvezda-2005 Perm	0	0	0
(Italy) Juventus	2	0	2
(Denmark) Brøndby	2	1	3

Round of 16
(Netherlands) Ajax	0	0	0
(France) Lyon	4	9	13
(Germany) VfL Wolfsburg	4	6	10
(Spain) Atlético Madrid	0	0	0
(England) Chelsea	1	6	7
(Italy) Fiorentina	0	0	0
(Sweden) Linköping	0	2	2
(France) Paris Saint-Germain	2	3	5
(Sweden) Rosengård	2	0	2
(Czech Republic) Slavia Praha	3	0	3
(Switzerland) Zürich	0	0	0
(Germany) Bayern Munich	2	3	5
(Spain) Barcelona	5	3	8
(Scotland) Glasgow City	0	0	0
(Norway) LSK Kvinner	1	2	3
(Denmark) Brøndby	1	0	1

Quarter-finals
(France) Lyon	2	4	6
(Germany) VfL Wolfsburg	1	2	3
(England) Chelsea	2	1	3
(France) Paris Saint-Germain	0	2	2
(Czech Republic) Slavia Praha	1	1	2
(Germany) Bayern Munich	1	5	6
(Spain) Barcelona	3	1	4
(Norway) LSK Kvinner	0	0	0

Semi-finals
(France) Lyon	2	1	3
(England) Chelsea	1	1	2
(Germany) Bayern Munich	0	0	0
(Spain) Barcelona	1	1	2

Final (18 May – Budapest)
(France) Lyon	4
(Spain) Barcelona	1

=== Round of 32 ===
The draw for the round of 32 was held on 17 August 2018, 14:00 CEST, at the UEFA headquarters in Nyon, Switzerland. The first legs were played on 12 and 13 September, and the second legs on 26 and 27 September 2018.

Team 1	Agg.	Team 2	1st leg	2nd leg
Honka (Finland)	1–6	(Switzerland) Zürich	0–1	1–5
Fiorentina (Italy)	4–0	(Denmark) Fortuna Hjørring	2–0	2–0
Ajax (Netherlands)	4–1	(Czech Republic) Sparta Praha	2–0	2–1
Avaldsnes (Norway)	0–7	(France) Lyon	0–2	0–5
Ryazan-VDV (Russia)	0–3	(Sweden) Rosengård	0–1	0–2
Juventus (Italy)	2–3	(Denmark) Brøndby	2–2	0–1
SFK 2000 (Bosnia and Herzegovina)	0–11	(England) Chelsea	0–5	0–6
Atlético Madrid (Spain)	3–1	(England) Manchester City	1–1	2–0
Þór/KA (Iceland)	0–3	(Germany) VfL Wolfsburg	0–1	0–2
Gintra Universitetas (Lithuania)	0–7	(Czech Republic) Slavia Praha	0–3	0–4
BIIK Kazygurt (Kazakhstan)	3–4	(Spain) Barcelona	3–1	0–3
Barcelona FA (Cyprus)	1–2	(Scotland) Glasgow City	0–2	1–0
Spartak Subotica (Serbia)	0–11	(Germany) Bayern Munich	0–7	0–4
St. Pölten (Austria)	1–6	(France) Paris Saint-Germain	1–4	0–2
Zhytlobud-1 Kharkiv (Ukraine)	1–10	(Sweden) Linköping	1–6	0–4
LSK Kvinner (Norway)	4–0	(Russia) Zvezda-2005 Perm	3–0	1–0

=== Round of 16 ===
The draw for the round of 16 was held on 1 October 2018, 13:00 CEST, at the UEFA headquarters in Nyon, Switzerland. The first legs were played on 17 and 18 October, and the second legs on 31 October and 1 November 2018.

Team 1	Agg.	Team 2	1st leg	2nd leg
Zürich (Switzerland)	0–5	(Germany) Bayern Munich	0–2	0–3
VfL Wolfsburg (Germany)	10–0	(Spain) Atlético Madrid	4–0	6–0
Ajax (Netherlands)	0–13	(France) Lyon	0–4	0–9
Barcelona (Spain)	8–0	(Scotland) Glasgow City	5–0	3–0
Linköping (Sweden)	2–5	(France) Paris Saint-Germain	0–2	2–3
Chelsea (England)	7–0	(Italy) Fiorentina	1–0	6–0
Rosengård (Sweden)	2–3	(Czech Republic) Slavia Praha	2–3	0–0
LSK Kvinner (Norway)	3–1	(Denmark) Brøndby	1–1	2–0

=== Quarter-finals ===
The draw for the quarter-finals was held on 9 November 2018, 13:00 CET, at the UEFA headquarters in Nyon, Switzerland. The first legs were played on 20 and 21 March, and the second legs on 27 March 2019.

During the Chelsea - PSG tie a number of arrests were made by the Metropolitan Police of travelling supporters of PSG who were arrested for possession of illegal drugs, weapons and vandalism. This was after disorder was reported at Waterloo and Wimbledon Train stations and a bus carrying PSG supporters being searched and barred entry to Kingsmeadow Stadium.

Team 1	Agg.	Team 2	1st leg	2nd leg
Slavia Praha (Czech Republic)	2–6	(Germany) Bayern Munich	1–1	1–5
Barcelona (Spain)	4–0	(Norway) LSK Kvinner	3–0	1–0
Lyon (France)	6–3	(Germany) VfL Wolfsburg	2–1	4–2
Chelsea (England)	3–2	(France) Paris Saint-Germain	2–0	1–2

=== Semi-finals ===
The draw for the semi-finals was held on 9 November 2018, 13:00 CET (after the quarter-final draw), at the UEFA headquarters in Nyon, Switzerland. The first legs were played on 21 April, and the second legs on 28 April 2019.

Team 1	Agg.	Team 2	1st leg	2nd leg
Lyon (France)	3–2	(England) Chelsea	2–1	1–1
Bayern Munich (Germany)	0–2	(Spain) Barcelona	0–1	0–1

=== Final ===
The final was played on 18 May 2019 at the Groupama Arena in Budapest. The "home" team for the final (for administrative purposes) was determined by an additional draw held after the quarter-final and semi-final draws.

18 May 2019
18:00 UTC+2

Lyon (France)	4–1	(Spain) Barcelona
Marozsán 5'; Hegerberg 14', 19', 30'	Report	Oshoala 89'

Groupama Arena, Budapest
Attendance: 19,487
Referee: Anastasia Pustovoitova (Russia)

== Statistics ==
Notes

- — denotes the team did not participate in this stage.

=== Top goalscorers ===
Qualifying goals count towards the topscorer award.

Rank	Player	Team	Goals		
Rank	Player	Team	Qual	Tourn	Total
1	(Denmark) Pernille Harder	(Germany) VfL Wolfsburg	—	8	8
2	(Cyprus) Krystyna Freda	(Cyprus) Barcelona FA	6	1	7
2	(Norway) Ada Hegerberg	(France) Lyon	—	7	7
4	(Czech Republic) Petra Divišová	(Czech Republic) Slavia Praha	5	1	6
4	(Czech Republic) Tereza Kožárová	(Czech Republic) Slavia Praha	2	4	6
4	(France) Eugénie Le Sommer	(France) Lyon	—	6	6
7	(Belgium) Tine De Caigny	(Belgium) Anderlecht	5	—	5
7	(England) Toni Duggan	(Spain) Barcelona	—	5	5
7	(Brazil) Isadora Freitas	(Lithuania) Gintra Universitetas	5	0	5
7	(France) Marie-Antoinette Katoto	(France) Paris Saint-Germain	—	5	5
7	(England) Fran Kirby	(England) Chelsea	—	5	5

Source: UEFA

=== Squad of the season ===
The following players were named in the squad of the season:

Goalkeepers

- Sandra Paños (Barcelona)
- Sarah Bouhaddi (Lyon)

Defenders

- Millie Bright (Chelsea)
- Amel Majri (Lyon)
- Wendie Renard (Lyon)
- Irene Paredes (Paris Saint-Germain)
- Lucy Bronze (Lyon)
- Griedge M'Bock Bathy (Lyon)

Midfielders

- Vicky Losada (Barcelona)
- Melanie Leupolz (Bayern München)
- Amandine Henry (Lyon)
- Dzsenifer Marozsán (Lyon)
- Alexia Putellas (Barcelona)

Forwards

- Erin Cuthbert (Chelsea)
- Ada Hegerberg (Lyon)
- Eugénie Le Sommer (Lyon)
- Pernille Harder (Wolfsburg)
- Karen Carney (Chelsea)

== See also ==
- 2018–19 UEFA Champions League
