= Marija Maraš =

Montenegrin footballer

Personal information
- Date of birth: 23 September 2002 (age 24)
- Position: Defender

Team information
- Current team: Breznica
- Number: 6

Senior career*
Years	Team	Apps	(Gls)
- Lovćen
2017–2019	Obilić		
2019–2023	Breznica	38	(2)
2023	Medyk Konin	10	(0)
2024–	Breznica	2	(0)

International career^{‡}
2017–2018	Montenegro U17	6	(0)
2019–2020	Montenegro U19	3	(0)
2019–	Montenegro	17	(0)
- * Club domestic league appearances and goals as of 21 September 2024 ‡ National team caps and goals as of 11 February 2024

Marija Maraš (born 23 September 2002) is a Montenegrin footballer who plays as a defender for Montenegrin Women's League club Breznica and the Montenegro national team.
