= Vysokyi Training Center =

Sports venue in Kharkiv Oblast, Ukraine

Vysokyi Training Centre
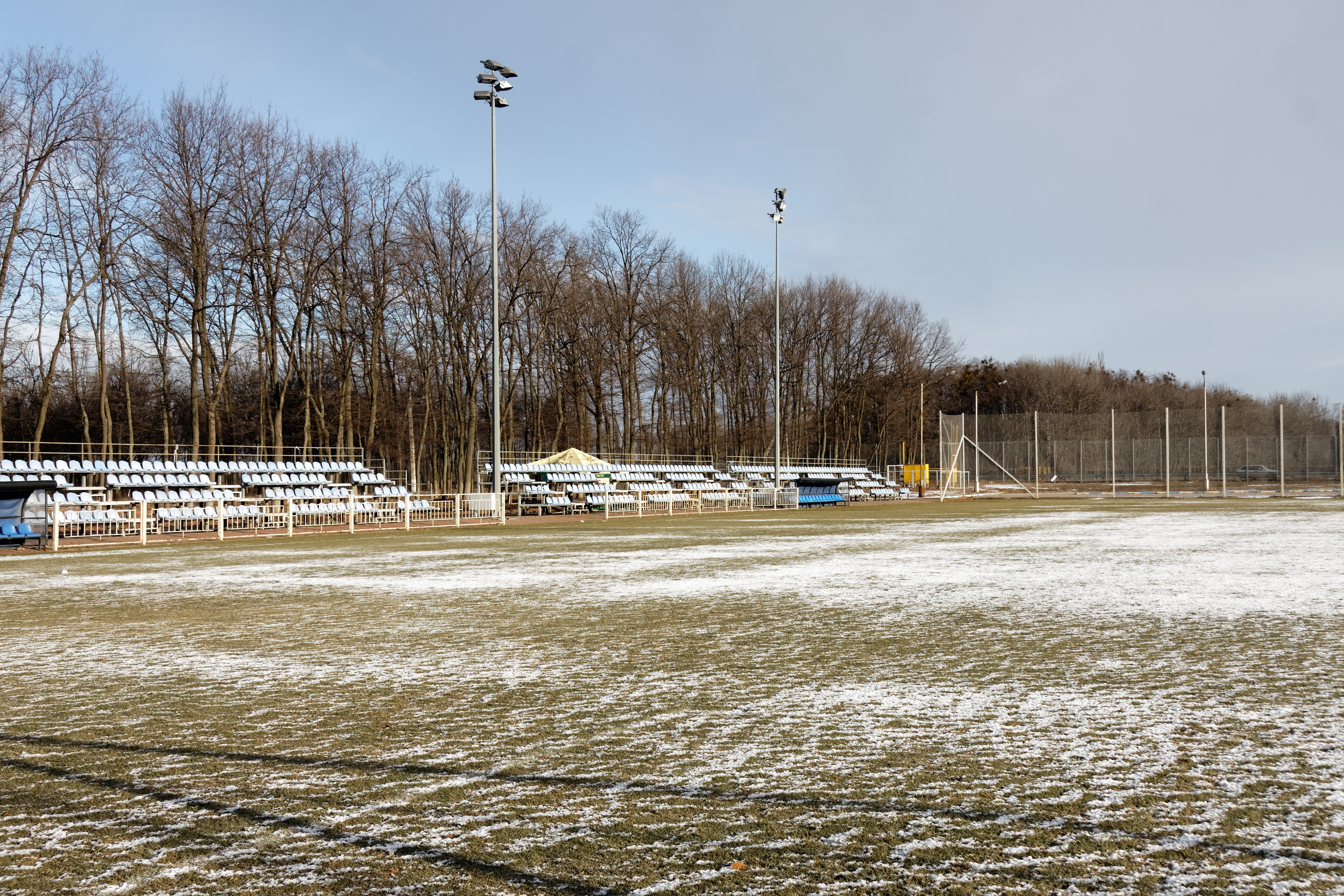
- Interactive map of Vysokyi Training Centre
- Location: Vysokyi, Ukraine
- Coordinates: 49°52′56″N 36°09′33″E
- Owner: FC Metalist Kharkiv
- Type: Sports facility

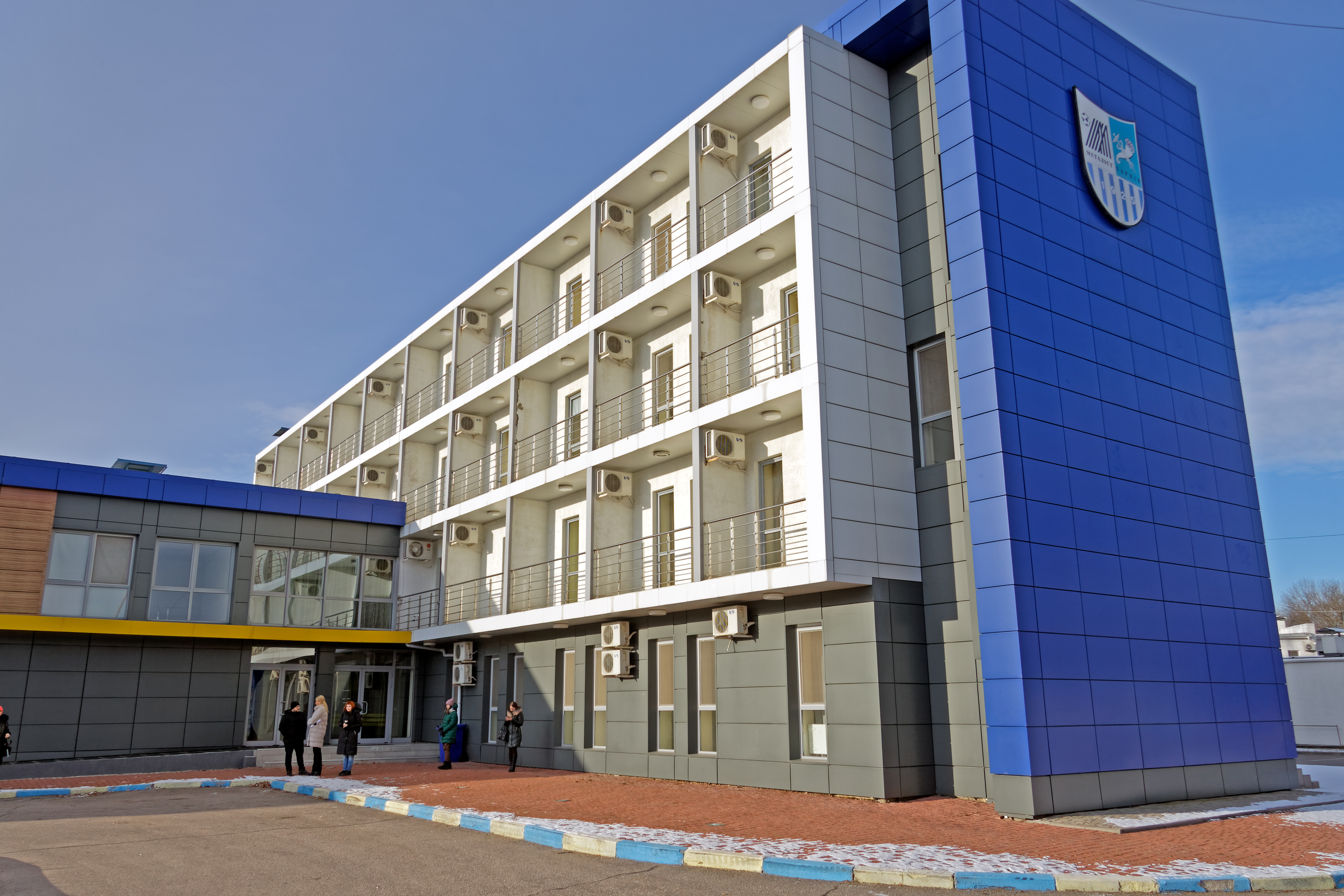

The Vysokyi Training Centre (Ukrainian: Навчально-тренувальна база «Високий») is the training facility of the Ukrainian Premier League club Metalist Kharkiv and its U-19 side located near Kharkiv. Since the centre's opening, upgrades have been made including a rehabilitation centre, gymnasium, canteen, consulting room, medical offices, and many other services. The center is located 7 km (4.3 mi) away from the Kharkiv International Airport.

== Description ==
The Vysokyi Training Centre consists of several playing association football fields, a hotel complex and a rehabilitation center. It was completely rebuilt in preparation to the UEFA Euro 2012. During the UEFA Euro 2012, it was housing national teams of Denmark, Germany, and Portugal.

Beside Metalist, Vysokyi also hosted games of women football clubs WFC Zhytlobud-1 Kharkiv and WFC Zhytlobud-2 Kharkiv.
