= Ágnes Nagy =

Hungarian footballer

Agnes Nagy
Personal information
- Date of birth: 27 July 1992 (age 34)
- Position: Midfielder

Team information
- Current team: MTK Hungária
- Number: 21

Senior career*
Years	Team	Apps	(Gls)
–2016	MTK Hungária		
2016–2018	Ferencváros		
2018–	MTK Hungária		

International career
2016–	Hungary	2	(0)
- * Club domestic league appearances and goals

Agnes Nagy (born 27 July 1992) is a Hungarian footballer who plays as a midfielder and has appeared for the Hungary women's national team.

== Club career ==
Nagy played domestic football with MTK Hungária in the Női NB I.

In June 2016, Nagy joined Ferencváros. She also represented them in the 2016–17 UEFA Women's Champions League, playing three matches in the group qualifying round, in which she scored a goal against Konak Belediyespor.

Nagy re-joined MTK Hungária after a couple of seasons at Ferencváros.

== International career ==
In 2016, Nagy represented Hungary during the Women's Euro 2017 qualifying stage, coming on as a substitute for Evelin Fenyvesi in the 89th minute.

In 2017, Nagy represented Hungary during the 2019 FIFA Women's World Cup qualifying cycle, coming on as a substitute for Zsófia Rácz in the 87th minute against Croatia.

Nagy was called up to Hungary's initial squad for the 2018 Cyprus Women's Cup, but wasn't selected for the final squad.
