= Henni Malinen =

Finnish footballer (born 1988)

Personal information
- Full name: Henni-Marika Malinen
- Date of birth: 17 November 1988 (age 37)
- Position: Forward

Senior career*
Years	Team	Apps	(Gls)
2006-	Honka		

International career
- Finland
- * Club domestic league appearances and goals

Henni Malinen (born 17 November 1988) is a Finnish footballer who plays for FC Honka in the Kansallinen Liiga.

== International career ==
Malinen was part of the Finnish team at the 2013 European Championships.
