= Mafalda Marujo =

Portuguese association football player

Personal information
- Full name: Ana Mafalda Jesus Marujo
- Date of birth: 24 August 1991 (age 35)
- Height: 1.60 m (5 ft 3 in)
- Position: Forward

Team information
- Current team: Benfica

Mafalda Marujo (born 24 August 1991) is a Portuguese footballer who played as a striker for Benfica.
