= Biljana Vraneš =

Montenegrin footballer

Personal information
- Date of birth: 3 February 1999 (age 27)
- Position: Midfielder

International career^{‡}
Years	Team	Apps	(Gls)
- Montenegro
- ‡ National team caps and goals as of 19:45, 30 August 2019 (UTC)

Biljana Vraneš (Serbian Cyrillic: Биљана Вранеш; born 3 February 1999) is a footballer who plays as a midfielder and has appeared for the Montenegro women's national team.

== Career ==
Vraneš has been capped for the Montenegro national team, appearing for the team during the 2019 FIFA Women's World Cup qualifying cycle.
