= Patricia Willi =

Swiss footballer (born 1991)

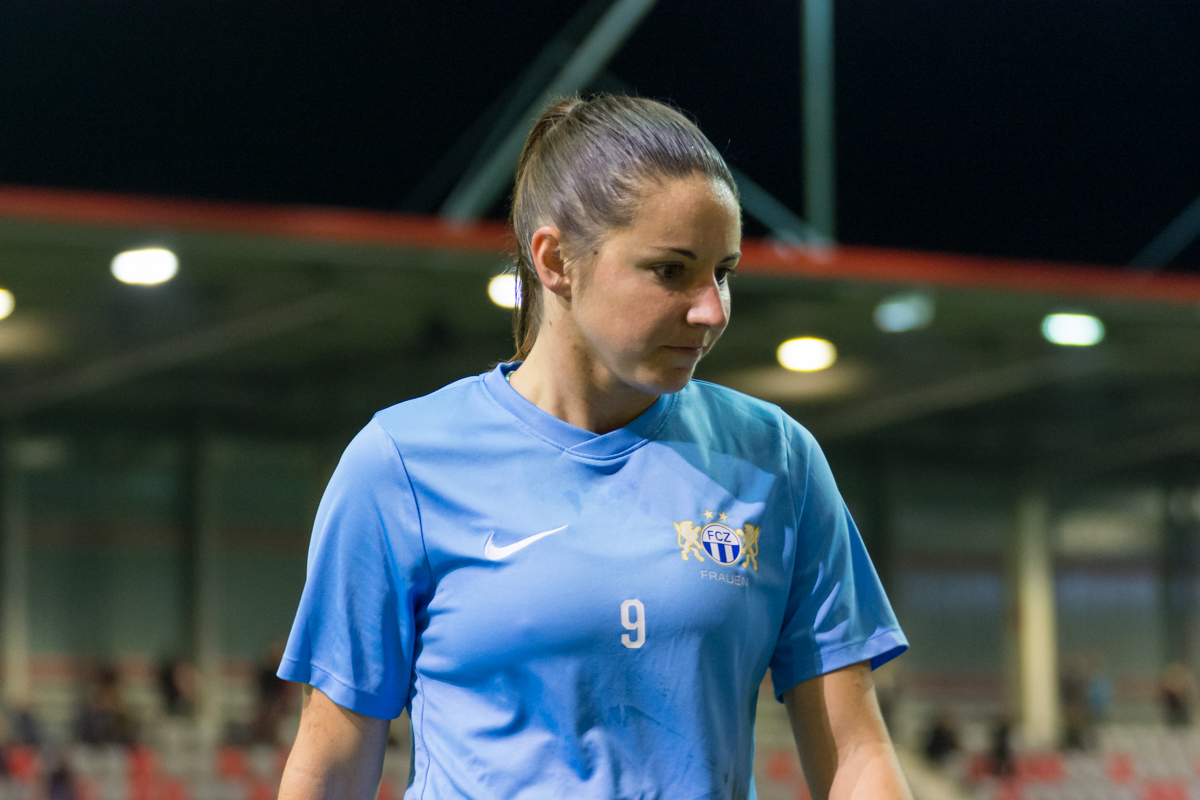
- Willi in 2018

Personal information
- Date of birth: 27 December 1991 (age 34)
- Place of birth: Walenstadt, Switzerland
- Height: 1.62 m (5 ft 4 in)
- Position: Midfielder

Team information
- Current team: FC St. Gallen

International career
Years	Team	Apps	(Gls)
- Switzerland

Patricia Willi (born 27 December 1991) is a Swiss footballer who played as a midfielder for FC St. Gallen and Switzerland national team.
