= Denali Murnan =

American soccer player (born 1993)

Personal information
- Full name: Denali Marie Murnan
- Date of birth: June 12, 1993 (age 33)
- Place of birth: Anchorage, Alaska, U.S.
- Height: 5 ft 11 in (1.80 m)
- Position: Midfielder

College career
Years	Team	Apps	(Gls)
2011–2015	UNLV Rebels	82	(15)

Senior career*
Years	Team	Apps	(Gls)
2016	Oulu Nice Soccer	13	(4)
2017–2018	Zaragoza	20	(0)
2019–2024	S.C. Braga		
- * Club domestic league appearances and goals

Denali Marie Murnan (born June 12, 1993) is a retired American soccer player who played for the Portuguese club Braga and Zaragoza CFF of Spain.

== Early life ==
Murnan was born June 12, 1993 to John and Susan Murnan in Anchorage, Alaska, United States. Her father, John, played collegiate soccer at Colorado State University in the 1980s. Murnan grew up and went to high school in Colorado where she played both soccer and basketball for her high school team, the Mustangs.

== College ==
Murnan studied at the University of Nevada, Las Vegas (UNLV) from 2011 to 2015. She participated in the college's intercollegiate athletics team, the UNLV Rebels. While at college, she played both soccer and basketball. Denali had a redshirt year in 2013 after breaking her elbow. During her time at UNLV, Murnan was twice named the Mountain West Conference All-Conference Second Team of the Year in 2014 and 2015. Murnan made 82 appearances for the UNLV Rebels and is their 10th highest scorer of all time with 15 goals.

== Career ==
Denali Murnan signed her first professional soccer contract with Finnish Naisten Liiga team Oulu Nice Soccer (ONS) in 2016. In her only season in Finland, ONS finished eighth in the 2016 Naisten Liiga.

A year later, Murnan transferred to Spanish Primera División team Zaragoza CFF. She made 20 appearances as Zaragoza finished 15th and were relegated from the 2017–18 Primera División.

In 2018, Murnan transferred to the Campeonato Nacional Feminino team Braga in Portugal. In her second season, Murnan helped Braga to win the Campeonato Nacional Feminino for the first time in 2018–19. The team also won the Taça de Portugal Feminina in 2019–20 for the first time.

== Honors ==
Braga

- Campeonato Nacional: 2018–19
- Taça de Portugal Feminina: 2019–20
