= FC Martve =

- Full name: ქსკ მართვე
- League: Georgia women's football championship
- 2024: 7th
Home colours	Away colours

FC Martve (Georgian: ქსკ მართვე) is a Georgian women's football club based in Kutaisi. They play in the Georgia women's football championship.

The team finished the 2016 season as champion, and will play in the 2017–18 UEFA Women's Champions League qualifying round.

In July 2023, the Kutaisi City Court found Martve's then-manager, Paata Dograshvili, guilty of sexually harassing underage footballers at the club over several years. The club was also found guilty of creating an unsafe environment.

== Honours ==
- Georgia women's football championship
- (gold) (2) 2016, 2017
