= ŽFK Breznica =

- Full name: Ženski fudbalski klub Breznica
- Founded: 2013
- Ground: Stadion pod Golubinjom, Pljevlja, Montenegro
- Capacity: 5,140
- Manager: Zoran Vuković
- League: Montenegrin Women's League
- 2024–25: 1st (Champions)
- Website: http://fkbreznica.me/

ŽFK Breznica is a women's football club from Pljevlja, Montenegro, founded at 2013. It plays in the Montenegrin Women's League. On season 2015–16 the team won first champion title in club's history.

The club is from the same town as one of the most successful Montenegrin clubs in men's football - FK Rudar.

== History ==
Named after Breznica river, club is founded at 2013. ŽRK Breznica played its first season in Montenegrin Women's League at 2013–14, with final placement at second place. Same result was gained on the season 2014–15. At season 2015–16, ŽFK Breznica made huge success, surprisingly winning the champion title, after the long struggle with ŽFK Ekonomist. Two teams had same score, but ŽFK Breznica was better in direct matches. With their first title, ŽRK Breznica gained participation in 2016–17 UEFA Women's Champions League.

In all selections of ŽFK Breznica are playing more than 100 players.

== Current squad ==
As of 20 September 2023.

Note: Flags indicate national team as defined under FIFA eligibility rules; some limited exceptions apply. Players may hold more than one non-FIFA nationality.

No.	Pos.	Nation	Player
1	GK	MNE	Milica Knežević
2	DF	MNE	Tamara Tošić
4	DF	MNE	Miljana Rondović
5	MF	SRB	Marijana Jankov
6	DF	MNE	Marija Maraš
7	MF	MNE	Jelena Vujadinović
9	DF	SRB	Marija Jonović
10	MF	MNE	Biljana Vraneš
11	MF	SRB	Suzana Tanasković
12	GK	MNE	Ivana Čabarkapa

No.	Pos.	Nation	Player
13	MF	MNE	Danka Topalović
14	FW	SVN	Ana Milovič
15	MF	MNE	Milica Šebek
17	MF	MNE	Enida Bošnjak
20	DF	MNE	Jelena Tošić
21	FW	MKD	Simona Krstanovska
22	FW	MNE	Ana Knežević
23	DF	MNE	Maja Miletić
25	MF	MNE	Radosava Kočanović

== Honours and achievements ==
- National Championship:
  - winners (10): 2015–16, 2016–17, 2017–18, 2018–19, 2019–20, 2020–21, 2021–22, 2022–23, 2023–24, 2024–25
  - runners-up (2): 2013–14, 2014–15

== See also ==
- Montenegrin Women's League
- Football in Montenegro
