= Alexandra Hollá =

Slovak footballer

Personal information
- Date of birth: 24 October 1994 (age 32)
- Position: Midfielder

Team information
- Current team: Slovan Bratislava

International career^{‡}
Years	Team	Apps	(Gls)
- Slovakia
- ‡ National team caps and goals as of 19:49, 30 August 2019 (UTC)

Alexandra Hollá (born 24 October 1994) is a Slovak footballer who plays as a midfielder and has appeared for the Slovakia women's national team. Currently works at NKIM.

== Career ==
Hollá has been capped for the Slovakia national team, appearing for the team during the 2019 FIFA Women's World Cup qualifying cycle.
