= Isadora Freitas =

Brazilian association football player

Personal information
- Full name: Isadora Damasceno Freitas
- Date of birth: 21 October 1990 (age 36)
- Place of birth: Belo Horizonte, Brazil
- Height: 1.63 m (5 ft 4 in)
- Position: Forward

Senior career*
Years	Team	Apps	(Gls)
2015–2016	América Mineiro	11	(1)
2018	Grêmio Osasco	8	(2)
2018–2019	FC Gintra	13	(23)
2019–2020	Logroño	19	(1)
2020–2021	Rayo Vallecano	54	(7)
2022–2024	Flamengo	7	(1)
2024–2025	León	26	(0)
- * Club domestic league appearances and goals as of 22:08, 8 April 2024

Isadora Freitas is a Brazilian footballer who plays for Flamengo as a forward.

== Career ==
=== América Mineiro ===
Isadora made her league debut against Mixto on 9 September 2015. She scored her first goal for the club against São Francisco EC on 13 September 2015, scoring in the 46th minute.

=== Audax ===
Isadora made her league debut against Foz Cataratas FC on 25 April 2018. She scored her first goal for the club against Ponte Preta on 9 May 2018, scoring in the 80th minute.

=== FC Gintra ===
Isadora was the first Brazilian to play for Gintra. She scored on her league debut against Kaunas Žalgiris on 22 August 2018, scoring in the 12th minute. Isadora also played in the Baltic Women's Football League. She left Gintra.

=== Logroño ===
Isadora made her league debut against Rayo Vallecano on 8 September 2019. She scored her first goal against Levante on 24 November 2019, scoring in the 62nd minute.

=== Rayo Vallecano ===
Isadora joined Rayo Vallecano, but had some bureaucratic problems and joined later on. She made her league debut against Levante. She left Rayo after two seasons at the club.

=== Flamengo ===
Isadora joined Flamengo. She scored on her league debut against RB Bragantino on 3 August 2022, scoring in the 42nd minute.
