= Vysokyi =

Rural locality in Kharkiv Oblast, Ukraine

Vysokyi Високий
- Rural settlement
- Location in Kharkiv Oblast Location in Ukraine
- Coordinates: 49°53′15″N 36°07′16″E
- Country: Ukraine
- Oblast: Kharkiv Oblast
- Raion: Kharkiv Raion

Population (2022)
  - Total: 9,630
- Time zone: UTC+2 (EET)
  - Summer (DST): UTC+3 (EEST)

Vysokyi (Ukrainian: Високий, Russian: Высокий) is a rural settlement in Kharkiv Raion of Kharkiv Oblast in Ukraine. It is located approximately 10 kilometres (6.2 mi) southwest of the city of Kharkiv. Vysokyi hosts the administration of Vysokyi settlement hromada, one of the hromadas of Ukraine. Population: 9,630 (2022 estimate).

Until 26 January 2024, Vysokyi was designated urban-type settlement. On this day, a new law entered into force which abolished this status, and Vysokyi became a rural settlement.

== Economy ==
=== Transportation ===
Four railway stations, Naukovyi, Vysokyi, Zelenyi Hai, and Pivdennyi, are located in Vysokyi. They are on the railway connecting Kharkiv and Synelnykove via Lozova and Pavlohrad. There is significant passenger traffic through these stations.

Highway M18 connecting Kharkiv with Dnipro and Zaporizhzhia runs through the settlement.
