= Dovilė Gailevičiūtė =

Lithuanian footballer

Personal information
- Date of birth: 21 July 1996 (age 30)
- Height: 1.67 m (5 ft 6 in)
- Position: Midfielder

International career^{‡}
Years	Team	Apps	(Gls)
2017–	Lithuania	43	(4)
- ‡ National team caps and goals as of 19:40, 22 February 2022 (UTC)

Dovilė Gailevičiūtė (born 21 July 1996) is a Lithuanian footballer who plays as a midfielder and has appeared for the Lithuania women's national team.

== Career ==
Since 2012 she played for Lithuanian FC Gintra, Lithuanian champions.

Gailevičiūtė has been capped for the Lithuania national team, appearing for the team during the 2019 FIFA Women's World Cup qualifying cycle.

In January 2022 she signed with Italian Pink Bari, which played in Serie B.
