= 2020 UEFA Women's Under-17 Championship qualification =

Tournament details
- Dates: Qualifying round: 10 September – 28 October 2019; Elite round: Cancelled
- Teams: 46 (from 1 confederation)

Tournament statistics
- Matches played: 66
- Goals scored: 318 (4.82 per match)
- Top scorer(s): (Hungary) Emőke Pápai (Norway) Karoline Nagelhus Hernes (7 goals each)

The 2020 UEFA Women's Under-17 Championship qualifying competition was a women's under-17 football competition that was originally to determine the seven teams joining the automatically qualified hosts Sweden in the 2020 UEFA Women's Under-17 Championship final tournament, before being cancelled due to the COVID-19 pandemic in Europe.

Apart from Sweden, 46 of the remaining 54 UEFA member national teams entered the qualifying competition. Players born on or after 1 January 2003 were eligible to participate.

== Format ==
The qualifying competition consists of two rounds:

- Qualifying round: Apart from Spain and Germany, which receive byes to the elite round as the teams with the highest seeding coefficient, the remaining 44 teams are drawn into 11 groups of four teams. Each group is played in single round-robin format at one of the teams selected as hosts after the draw. The 11 group winners, the 11 runners-up, and the four third-placed teams with the best record against the first and second-placed teams in their group advance to the elite round.
- Elite round: The 28 teams are drawn into seven groups of four teams. Each group is played in single round-robin format at one of the teams selected as hosts after the draw. The seven group winners qualify for the final tournament.

The schedule of each group is as follows, with two rest days between each matchday (Regulations Article 20.04):

Group schedule
Matchday	Matches
Matchday 1	1 v 4, 3 v 2
Matchday 2	1 v 3, 2 v 4
Matchday 3	2 v 1, 4 v 3

=== Tiebreakers ===
In the qualifying round and elite round, teams are ranked according to points (3 points for a win, 1 point for a draw, 0 points for a loss), and if tied on points, the following tiebreaking criteria are applied, in the order given, to determine the rankings (Regulations Articles 14.01 and 14.02):

1. Points in head-to-head matches among tied teams;
2. Goal difference in head-to-head matches among tied teams;
3. Goals scored in head-to-head matches among tied teams;
4. If more than two teams are tied, and after applying all head-to-head criteria above, a subset of teams are still tied, all head-to-head criteria above are reapplied exclusively to this subset of teams;
5. Goal difference in all group matches;
6. Goals scored in all group matches;
7. Penalty shoot-out if only two teams have the same number of points, and they met in the last round of the group and are tied after applying all criteria above (not used if more than two teams have the same number of points, or if their rankings are not relevant for qualification for the next stage);
8. Disciplinary points (red card = 3 points, yellow card = 1 point, expulsion for two yellow cards in one match = 3 points);
9. UEFA coefficient ranking for the qualifying round draw;
10. Drawing of lots.

To determine the four best third-placed teams from the qualifying round, the results against the teams in fourth place are discarded. The following criteria are applied (Regulations Article 15.01):

1. Points;
2. Goal difference;
3. Goals scored;
4. Disciplinary points (total 3 matches);
5. UEFA coefficient ranking for the qualifying round draw;
6. Drawing of lots.

== Qualifying round ==
=== Draw ===
The draw for the qualifying round was held on 23 November 2018, 09:00 CET (UTC+1), at the UEFA headquarters in Nyon, Switzerland.

The teams were seeded according to their coefficient ranking, calculated based on the following:

- 2015 UEFA Women's Under-17 Championship final tournament and qualifying competition (qualifying round and elite round)
- 2016 UEFA Women's Under-17 Championship final tournament and qualifying competition (qualifying round and elite round)
- 2017 UEFA Women's Under-17 Championship final tournament and qualifying competition (qualifying round and elite round)
- 2018 UEFA Women's Under-17 Championship final tournament and qualifying competition (qualifying round and elite round)

Each group contained one team from Pot A, one team from Pot B, one team from Pot C, and one team from Pot D. Based on the decisions taken by the UEFA Emergency Panel, Russia and Ukraine could not be drawn in the same group.

Final tournament hosts
Team	Coeff.	Rank
**Sweden**	11.500	—

Bye to elite round
Team	Coeff.	Rank
Spain	32.056	1
Germany	31.167	2

Teams entering qualifying round

Pot A
Team	Coeff.	Rank
England	22.889	3
Norway	21.000	4
Netherlands	17.667	5
France	17.278	6
Republic of Ireland	15.722	7
Switzerland	15.111	8
Italy	15.056	9
Finland	13.833	10
Czech Republic	12.889	11
Denmark	12.833	12
Poland	12.722	13

Pot B
Team	Coeff.	Rank
Austria	11.833	14
Belgium	11.667	15
Serbia	11.500	16
Iceland	11.500	17
Hungary	10.000	18
Scotland	10.000	19
Russia	8.667	20
Slovenia	7.833	21
Portugal	7.000	22
Turkey	6.333	23
Greece	6.000	24

Pot C
Team	Coeff.	Rank
Belarus	6.000	25
Bosnia and Herzegovina	5.833	26
Wales	5.167	27
Slovakia	5.000	28
Northern Ireland	4.833	29
Ukraine	4.500	30
Romania	4.000	31
Bulgaria	4.000	32
Lithuania	3.333	33
Azerbaijan	3.167	34
Israel	2.667	35

Pot D
Team	Coeff.	Rank
Croatia	2.333	36
Montenegro	1.333	37
North Macedonia	1.333	38
Faroe Islands	1.000	39
Latvia	1.000	40
Malta	1.000	41
Estonia	0.333	42
Kazakhstan	0.333	43
Moldova	0.000	44
Georgia	0.000	45
Albania	—	46

Notes

- Teams marked in **bold** have qualified for the final tournament.

Did not enter
Andorra	Armenia	Cyprus	Gibraltar
Kosovo	Liechtenstein	Luxembourg	San Marino

=== Groups ===
The qualifying round is provisionally scheduled between 5 August and 27 October 2019.

Times up to 26 October 2019 are CEST (UTC+2), thereafter times are CET (UTC+1), as listed by UEFA (local times, if different, are in parentheses).

==== Group 1 ====
Pos	Team	Pld	W	D	L	GF	GA	GD	Pts	Qualification
1	England	3	3	0	0	10	1	+9	**9**	Elite round
2	Belgium	3	1	1	1	4	6	−2	**4**	Elite round
3	Croatia	3	1	0	2	1	3	−2	**3**	Elite round
4	Bosnia and Herzegovina (H)	3	0	1	2	2	7	−5	**1**	

Source: UEFA
Rules for classification: Tiebreakers
(H) Hosts
21 October 2019
10:30

England	2–0	Croatia
Verbanac 39' (o.g.); O'Brien 87'	Report

Bosnia and Herzegovina FA Training Centre, Zenica
Referee: Ioanna Allayiotou (Cyprus)
21 October 2019
15:30

Bosnia and Herzegovina	2–2	Belgium
Japić 73'; Milinković 77'	Report	Prez 37'; Vanzeir 90'

Bosnia and Herzegovina FA Training Centre, Zenica
Referee: Valentina Finzi (Italy)

24 October 2019
10:30

Belgium	1–0	Croatia
Prez 68'	Report

Bosnia and Herzegovina FA Training Centre, Zenica
Referee: Valentina Finzi (Italy)
24 October 2019
15:30

England	4–0	Bosnia and Herzegovina
Beever-Jones 14'; Edwards 38'; Watson 54'; Symonds 76'	Report

Bosnia and Herzegovina FA Training Centre, Zenica
Referee: Dimitrina Milkova (Bulgaria)

27 October 2019
13:30

Belgium	1–4	England
Vanzeir 58'	Report	Mace 10'; Watson 17'; Edwards 69'; Murphy 84'

MGM Farm Arena, Kakanj
Referee: Dimitrina Milkova (Bulgaria)
27 October 2019
13:30

Croatia	1–0	Bosnia and Herzegovina
Novak 71'	Report

Bosnia and Herzegovina FA Training Centre, Zenica
Referee: Ioanna Allayiotou (Cyprus)

==== Group 2 ====
Pos	Team	Pld	W	D	L	GF	GA	GD	Pts	Qualification
1	Switzerland	3	3	0	0	22	0	+22	**9**	Elite round
2	Turkey	3	1	1	1	8	8	0	**4**	Elite round
3	Romania	3	1	1	1	6	12	−6	**4**	Elite round
4	Moldova (H)	3	0	0	3	2	18	−16	**0**	

Source: UEFA
Rules for classification: Tiebreakers
(H) Hosts
19 September 2019
13:00 (14:00 EEST)

Switzerland	12–0	Moldova
Pilgrim 5', 17', 40'; Bienz 23', 58'; Touon 36'; Li Puma 63', 72', 90+1'; Darenscaia 74' (o.g.); S. Ueltschi 81', 85'	Report

Zimbru Stadium, Chișinău
Referee: Rasa Imanalijeva (Lithuania)
19 September 2019
13:00 (14:00 EEST)

Romania	4–4	Turkey
Botojel 12'; Borodi 49', 56'; Bălăceanu 75'	Report	Alayont 44', 90+8'; Kerimoğlu 66', 76'

CSR Orhei, Orhei
Referee: Yuliya Larionova (Azerbaijan)

22 September 2019
13:00 (14:00 EEST)

Switzerland	8–0	Romania
Li Puma 26'; Bienz 28' (pen.), 34', 36'; Wyss 39'; R. Ueltschi 43', 53'; Von Dach 60'	Report

CSR Orhei, Orhei
Referee: Katarzyna Lisiecka-sek (Poland)
22 September 2019
13:00 (14:00 EEST)

Turkey	4–2	Moldova
Içen 45+3', 67' (pen.), 78' (pen.); Alayont 46'	Report	Gamarț 47', 68'

Zimbru Stadium, Chișinău
Referee: Yuliya Larionova (Azerbaijan)

25 September 2019
13:00 (14:00 EEST)

Turkey	0–2	Switzerland
	Report	Hefti 27'; R. Ueltschi 66'

CSR Orhei, Orhei
Referee: Katarzyna Lisiecka-sek (Poland)
25 September 2019
13:00 (14:00 EEST)

Moldova	0–2	Romania
	Report	Botojel 52' (pen.); Borodi 87'

Zimbru Stadium, Chișinău
Referee: Rasa Imanalijeva (Lithuania)

==== Group 3 ====
Pos	Team	Pld	W	D	L	GF	GA	GD	Pts	Qualification
1	France	3	3	0	0	18	0	+18	**9**	Elite round
2	Iceland	3	2	0	1	11	4	+7	**6**	Elite round
3	Malta	3	0	1	2	1	8	−7	**1**	
4	Belarus (H)	3	0	1	2	2	20	−18	**1**	

Source: UEFA
Rules for classification: Tiebreakers
(H) Hosts
15 September 2019
11:00 (12:00 FET)

France	6–0	Malta
Mouchon 6'; Traoré 36'; Tall 43'; Hannequin 52' (pen.); Blanc 57'; Coquet 90+3'	Report

Spartak Stadium, Mogilev
Referee: Marina Aufschnaiter (Austria)
15 September 2019
17:00 (18:00 FET)

Belarus	1–10	Iceland
Surovtseva 85'	Report	Níelsdóttir 3', 11', 14', 18', 57'; Þórhallsdóttir 34' (pen.); Benediktsdóttir 59', 66', 82', 90+3'

Spartak Stadium, Mogilev
Referee: Merima Čelik (Bosnia and Herzegovina)

18 September 2019
11:00 (12:00 FET)

Iceland	1–0	Malta
Jacobsen Andradóttir 31'	Report

Spartak Stadium, Mogilev
Referee: Merima Čelik (Bosnia and Herzegovina)
18 September 2019
17:00 (18:00 FET)

France	9–0	Belarus
Mouchon 8', 40'; Fazer 10', 19', 44'; Traoré 33'; Mpomé 35'; Hannequin 72'; Bamenga Bofenda 87'	Report

Spartak Stadium, Mogilev
Referee: Jurgita Mačikunytė (Lithuania)

21 September 2019
13:00 (14:00 FET)

Iceland	0–3	France
	Report	Kbida 9'; Traoré 40'; Fazer 90'

City Stadium, Orsha
Referee: Jurgita Mačikunytė (Lithuania)
21 September 2019
13:00 (14:00 FET)

Malta	1–1	Belarus
Mifsud 74'	Report	Pobegaylo 81'

Spartak Stadium, Mogilev
Referee: Marina Aufschnaiter (Austria)

==== Group 4 ====
Pos	Team	Pld	W	D	L	GF	GA	GD	Pts	Qualification
1	Austria	3	3	0	0	18	1	+17	**9**	Elite round
2	Slovakia (H)	3	2	0	1	15	6	+9	**6**	Elite round
3	Finland	3	1	0	2	6	9	−3	**3**	
4	Estonia	3	0	0	3	3	26	−23	**0**	

Source: UEFA
Rules for classification: Tiebreakers
(H) Hosts
20 October 2019
12:00

Finland	5–1	Estonia
Nurmi 5'; Forsblom 14'; Sevenius 47', 86'; Määttä 82'	Report	Pärn 2'

NTC Senec, Senec
Referee: Emanuela Rusta (Albania)
20 October 2019
17:00

Slovakia	1–3	Austria
Pelikánová 52' (pen.)	Report	Purtscheller 34'; Magerl 45+1' (pen.), 56'

NTC Senec, Senec
Referee: Alexandra Ponomareva (Russia)

23 October 2019
12:00

Austria	12–0	Estonia
Purtscheller 5', 29'; Magerl 19', 87'; Kraker 21'; D'Angelo 32', 45', 51'; Pfanner 48', 66'; Praher 71'; Fritsch 78'	Report

NTC Senec, Senec
Referee: Alexandra Ponomareva (Russia)
23 October 2019
17:00

Finland	1–5	Slovakia
Kršiaková 28' (o.g.)	Report	Pelikánová 25', 26'; Morávková 50'; Jedináková 62', 77'

NTC Senec, Senec
Referee: Jelena Pejković (Croatia)

26 October 2019
14:00

Austria	3–0	Finland
Pfanner 22'; Magerl 31'; Dorn 90+3'	Report

NTC Dunajská Lužná, Dunajská Lužná
Referee: Jelena Pejković (Croatia)
26 October 2019
14:00

Estonia	2–9	Slovakia
Kršiaková 53' (o.g.); Teern 81'	Report	Retkesová 13', 44'; Pelikánová 23', 69'; Jedináková 27'; Vredíková 32'; Morávková 33', 79', 86'

NTC Senec, Senec
Referee: Emanuela Rusta (Albania)

==== Group 5 ====
Pos	Team	Pld	W	D	L	GF	GA	GD	Pts	Qualification
1	Norway	3	3	0	0	22	0	+22	**9**	Elite round
2	Slovenia	3	2	0	1	10	5	+5	**6**	Elite round
3	Faroe Islands (H)	3	1	0	2	1	16	−15	**3**	
4	Azerbaijan	3	0	0	3	0	12	−12	**0**	

Source: UEFA
Rules for classification: Tiebreakers
(H) Hosts
17 October 2019
14:00 (13:00 WEST)

Azerbaijan	0–6	Slovenia
	Report	Suhobersnik 13', 19', 20'; Kajzba 78' (pen.); Šabotič 86'; Mele 89'

Tórsvøllur, Tórshavn
Referee: Kateryna Usova (Ukraine)
17 October 2019
18:30 (17:30 WEST)

Norway	12–0	Faroe Islands
Brønstad 6'; Omarsdottir 13', 24'; Laupstad 19', 22'; Ose 32'; Løvås 58'; Hernes 59', 90' (pen.), 90+1'; Sørbo 64'; Brunes 86'	Report

Tórsvøllur, Tórshavn
Referee: Jelena Jermolajeva (Latvia)

20 October 2019
14:00 (13:00 WEST)

Norway	5–0	Azerbaijan
Lundblad 1'; Omarsdottir 6' (pen.), 18'; Dirdal 19'; Hernes 33'	Report

Tórsvøllur, Tórshavn
Referee: Zulema González (Spain)
20 October 2019
18:30 (17:30 WEST)

Slovenia	4–0	Faroe Islands
Mele 24'; Suhobersnik 33', 68'; Ham 72'	Report

Tórsvøllur, Tórshavn
Referee: Kateryna Usova (Ukraine)

23 October 2019
14:00 (13:00 WEST)

Slovenia	0–5	Norway
	Report	Hernes 45+3', 61', 68'; Brønstad 66'; Omarsdottir 83'

Gundadalur, Tórshavn
Referee: Zulema González (Spain)
23 October 2019
14:00 (13:00 WEST)

Faroe Islands	1–0	Azerbaijan
Eilersdóttir Rasmussen 73'	Report

Tórsvøllur, Tórshavn
Referee: Jelena Jermolajeva (Latvia)

==== Group 6 ====
Pos	Team	Pld	W	D	L	GF	GA	GD	Pts	Qualification
1	Russia	3	3	0	0	12	3	+9	**9**	Elite round
2	Denmark (H)	3	1	1	1	14	4	+10	**4**	Elite round
3	Wales	3	1	1	1	1	3	−2	**4**	Elite round
4	North Macedonia	3	0	0	3	0	17	−17	**0**	

Source: UEFA
Rules for classification: Tiebreakers
(H) Hosts
22 September 2019
14:00

Denmark	11–0	North Macedonia
Gravesen 5', 7', 20', 41'; Thygesen 23'; Vistisen 34'; Veletanlic 58', 61', 79'; Hornsleth 77'; Rylov 90+5'	Report

Skjern Stadion, Skjern
Referee: Maria Sole Caputi (Italy)
22 September 2019
14:00

Wales	0–3	Russia
	Report	Chochieva 8'; Trofimova 14' (pen.); Semenova 90+5'

Ringkøbing Stadion, Ringkøbing
Referee: Karoline Wacker (Germany)

25 September 2019
14:00

Denmark	0–0	Wales
	Report

Ringkøbing Stadion, Ringkøbing
Referee: Veronika Kovarova (Czech Republic)
25 September 2019
14:00

Russia	5–0	North Macedonia
Sharifova 3'; Chochieva 23'; Kishmakhova 68'; Trofimova 74' (pen.); Stepanova 90+2'	Report

Skjern Stadion, Skjern
Referee: Karoline Wacker (Germany)

28 September 2019
14:00

Russia	4–3	Denmark
Trofimova 28'; Chochieva 48'; Belova 84'; Semenova 90+6'	Report	Thygesen 44'; Rylov 68'; Clausen 73'

Ringkøbing Stadion, Ringkøbing
Referee: Veronika Kovarova (Czech Republic)
28 September 2019
14:00

North Macedonia	0–1	Wales
	Report	McAteer 22'

Skjern Stadion, Skjern
Referee: Maria Sole Caputi (Italy)

==== Group 7 ====
Pos	Team	Pld	W	D	L	GF	GA	GD	Pts	Qualification
1	Republic of Ireland	3	3	0	0	21	0	+21	**9**	Elite round
2	Greece	3	2	0	1	4	5	−1	**6**	Elite round
3	Lithuania (H)	3	1	0	2	2	10	−8	**3**	
4	Albania	3	0	0	3	1	13	−12	**0**	

Source: UEFA
Rules for classification: Tiebreakers
(H) Hosts
10 September 2019
14:00 (15:00 EEST)

Republic of Ireland	10–0	Albania
McLaughlin 12', 29', 33'; Brown 21', 31'; Shine 51'; Horgan 60'; Clancy 65'; Slevin 73'; Watkins 89'	Report

Alytus Stadium, Alytus
Referee: Cristina Trandafir (Romania)
10 September 2019
14:00 (15:00 EEST)

Lithuania	0–3	Greece
	Report	Kokmotou 52'; Papatheodorou 60', 64'

Sūduva Stadium, Marijampolė
Referee: Liudmyla Telbukh (Ukraine)

13 September 2019
14:00 (15:00 EEST)

Greece	1–0	Albania
Papatheodorou 43'	Report

Alytus Stadium, Alytus
Referee: Liudmyla Telbukh (Ukraine)
13 September 2019
17:00 (18:00 EEST)

Republic of Ireland	6–0	Lithuania
Devaney 1'; McLaughlin 10', 37'; Molloy 27'; Clancy 69' (pen.); Brown 74'	Report

Sūduva Stadium, Marijampolė
Referee: Victoria Beyer (France)

16 September 2019
14:00 (15:00 EEST)

Greece	0–5	Republic of Ireland
	Report	Brown 45+1'; Clancy 60'; Doherty 74'; O'Dowd 87'; Watkins 90'

Alytus Stadium, Alytus
Referee: Victoria Beyer (France)
16 September 2019
14:00 (15:00 EEST)

Albania	1–2	Lithuania
Armoku 65'	Report	Valiukevičiūtė 47'; Jonušaitė 62'

Sūduva Stadium, Marijampolė
Referee: Cristina Trandafir (Romania)

==== Group 8 ====
Pos	Team	Pld	W	D	L	GF	GA	GD	Pts	Qualification
1	Czech Republic	3	2	1	0	7	2	+5	**7**	Elite round
2	Serbia (H)	3	2	0	1	8	4	+4	**6**	Elite round
3	Ukraine	3	0	2	1	4	6	−2	**2**	Elite round
4	Georgia	3	0	1	2	1	8	−7	**1**	

Source: UEFA
Rules for classification: Tiebreakers
(H) Hosts
20 October 2019
12:00

Czech Republic	4–0	Georgia
Dinh Thanhová 45+2', 71' (pen.); Kochanová 85'; Holá 87'	Report

Sports Center of FA of Serbia, Stara Pazova
Referee: Alina Peşu (Romania)
20 October 2019
17:00

Ukraine	2–4	Serbia
Ivanchenko 50'; Kaverzina 79'	Report	Ćirić 45'; Andrić 51', 75'; Čavić 68'

Sports Center of FA of Serbia, Stara Pazova
Referee: Rasa Imanalijeva (Lithuania)

23 October 2019
11:00

Czech Republic	1–1	Ukraine
Střížová 7'	Report	Dovhanyk 41'

Sports Center of FA of Serbia pitch 4, Stara Pazova
Referee: Laura Rapp (Sweden)
23 October 2019
14:00

Serbia	3–0	Georgia
Stevanović 13'; Kucinar 25'; Obradović 58'	Report

Zemun Stadium, Belgrade
Referee: Rasa Imanalijeva (Lithuania)

26 October 2019
14:00

Serbia	1–2	Czech Republic
Ćirić 72'	Report	Ohlídalová 4'; Csordás 29'

Sports Center of FA of Serbia, Stara Pazova
Referee: Laura Rapp (Sweden)
26 October 2019
14:00

Georgia	1–1	Ukraine
Danelia 84'	Report	Dovhanyk 24'

Sports Center of FA of Serbia pitch 4, Stara Pazova
Referee: Alina Peşu (Romania)

==== Group 9 ====
Pos	Team	Pld	W	D	L	GF	GA	GD	Pts	Qualification
1	Hungary (H)	3	3	0	0	18	0	+18	**9**	Elite round
2	Poland	3	2	0	1	14	2	+12	**6**	Elite round
3	Bulgaria	3	1	0	2	6	11	−5	**3**	
4	Kazakhstan	3	0	0	3	0	25	−25	**0**	

Source: UEFA
Rules for classification: Tiebreakers
(H) Hosts
2 October 2019
14:00

Bulgaria	0–7	Hungary
	Report	Pápai 5', 23', 33', 75' (pen.), 90+3'; Mészáros 28', 57'

Rohonci út, Szombathely
Referee: Fatemeh Zangeneh (Norway)
3 October 2019
12:00

Poland	10–0	Kazakhstan
Kodym 20'; Wróbel 31', 60', 61', 83'; Kiszkis 34', 62'; Sobal 45+1'; Krezyman 70'; Ivanova 89' (o.g.)	Report

Rohonci út, Szombathely
Referee: Abigail Marriott (England)

Note: Poland v Kazakhstan, originally to be played on 2 October 2019, 17:15 local time, was postponed to the next day.

5 October 2019
12:00

Hungary	10–0	Kazakhstan
Pápai 4', 79'; Plotnikova 5' (o.g.); Savanya 14', 90'; Mészáros 22', 70'; Vida 30'; Siber 40'; Sosnovskaya 65' (o.g.)	Report

Rohonci út, Szombathely
Referee: Fatemeh Zangeneh (Norway)
5 October 2019
15:15

Poland	4–1	Bulgaria
Czyż 23'; Sobal 59'; Krezyman 78'; Szydełko 90+5'	Report	Yordanova 71'

Rohonci út, Szombathely
Referee: Ainara Acevedo (Spain)

8 October 2019
12:30

Hungary	1–0	Poland
Bokor 50'	Report

Rohonci út, Szombathely
Referee: Ainara Acevedo (Spain)
8 October 2019
12:30

Kazakhstan	0–5	Bulgaria
	Report	D. Ivanova 56' (pen.), 75'; Parapunova 62'; B. Ivanova 73'; V. Ivanova 77'

Király Sportlétesítmény, Szombathely
Referee: Abigail Marriott (England)

==== Group 10 ====
Pos	Team	Pld	W	D	L	GF	GA	GD	Pts	Qualification
1	Italy	3	3	0	0	10	0	+10	**9**	Elite round
2	Scotland (H)	3	2	0	1	8	5	+3	**6**	Elite round
3	Montenegro	3	0	1	2	1	7	−6	**1**	
4	Northern Ireland	3	0	1	2	2	9	−7	**1**	

Source: UEFA
Rules for classification: Tiebreakers
(H) Hosts
14 October 2019
13:00 (12:00 BST)

Italy	2–0	Montenegro
Severini 14'; Arcangeli 56'	Report

Oriam indoor, Edinburgh
Referee: Viki De Cremer (Belgium)
14 October 2019
18:30 (17:30 BST)

Northern Ireland	1–4	Scotland
Morgan 74'	Report	McAllister 4'; McCafferty 14'; McQuillan 24', 27'

Oriam indoor, Edinburgh
Referee: Katalin Sipos (Hungary)

17 October 2019
13:00 (12:00 BST)

Italy	4–0	Northern Ireland
Severini 14' (pen.); Berti 47'; Beccari 51'; Musolino 63'	Report

Oriam indoor, Edinburgh
Referee: Catarina Campos (Portugal)
17 October 2019
18:30 (17:30 BST)

Scotland	4–0	Montenegro
McQuillan 17', 49'; Hutchison 25', 35'	Report

Oriam indoor, Edinburgh
Referee: Katalin Sipos (Hungary)

20 October 2019
13:30 (12:30 BST)

Scotland	0–4	Italy
	Report	Beccari 27'; Arcangeli 33'; Pavan 42'; Berti 59'

Ainslie Park, Edinburgh
Referee: Catarina Campos (Portugal)
20 October 2019
13:30 (12:30 BST)

Montenegro	1–1	Northern Ireland
Cimbaljević 29'	Report	Morgan 68'

Oriam indoor, Edinburgh
Referee: Viki De Cremer (Belgium)

==== Group 11 ====
Pos	Team	Pld	W	D	L	GF	GA	GD	Pts	Qualification
1	Netherlands	3	2	1	0	9	1	+8	**7**	Elite round
2	Portugal (H)	3	2	1	0	9	2	+7	**7**	Elite round
3	Israel	3	1	0	2	3	7	−4	**3**	
4	Latvia	3	0	0	3	1	12	−11	**0**	

Source: UEFA
Rules for classification: Tiebreakers
(H) Hosts
22 October 2019
16:00 (15:00 WEST)

Israel	1–4	Portugal
Almasri 56'	Report	Sirota 33' (o.g.); Negrão 42'; Almeida 85'; Correia 90+4'

Complexo Desportivo da Camacha Campo B, Camacha
Attendance: 141
Referee: Tanja Racic (Bosnia and Herzegovina)
22 October 2019
17:00 (16:00 WEST)

Netherlands	6–0	Latvia
Noordman 3'; Brugts 20', 54', 74', 90' (pen.); Van der Veen 38'	Report

Estádio Municipal de Machico, Machico
Attendance: 150
Referee: Cansu Tiryaki (Turkey)

25 October 2019
16:00 (15:00 WEST)

Portugal	4–0	Latvia
Assucena 24' (pen.); Oliveira 66', 75', 90+2'	Report

Estádio da Madeira, Funchal
Attendance: 137
Referee: Tanja Racic (Bosnia and Herzegovina)
25 October 2019
17:00 (16:00 WEST)

Netherlands	2–0	Israel
Brugts 28'; Kruize 31'	Report

Complexo Desportivo da Camacha Campo B, Camacha
Attendance: 120
Referee: Sandra Strub (Switzerland)

28 October 2019
16:00 (15:00 WET)

Portugal	1–1	Netherlands
Miller 18'	Report	Brugts 37'

Estádio do Marítimo, Funchal
Attendance: 322
Referee: Sandra Strub (Switzerland)
28 October 2019
16:00 (15:00 WET)

Latvia	1–2	Israel
Kozlova 41'	Report	Horvitz 53'; Ovsjankina 83' (o.g.)

Complexo Desportivo da Camacha Campo B, Camacha
Attendance: 100
Referee: Cansu Tiryaki (Turkey)

=== Ranking of third-placed teams ===
To determine the four best third-placed teams from the qualifying round which advance to the elite round, only the results of the third-placed teams against the first and second-placed teams in their group are taken into account.

Pos	Grp	Team	Pld	W	D	L	GF	GA	GD	Pts	Qualification
1	8	Ukraine	2	0	1	1	3	5	−2	1	Elite round
2	6	Wales	2	0	1	1	0	3	−3	1	Elite round
3	2	Romania	2	0	1	1	4	12	−8	1	Elite round
4	1	Croatia	2	0	0	2	0	3	−3	0	Elite round
5	11	Israel	2	0	0	2	1	6	−5	0	
6	10	Montenegro	2	0	0	2	0	6	−6	0	
7	4	Finland	2	0	0	2	1	8	−7	0	
8	3	Malta	2	0	0	2	0	7	−7	0	
9	7	Lithuania	2	0	0	2	0	9	−9	0	
10	9	Bulgaria	2	0	0	2	1	11	−10	0	
11	5	Faroe Islands	2	0	0	2	0	16	−16	0	

Source: UEFA
Rules for classification: 1) points; 2) goal difference; 3) goals scored; 4) disciplinary points; 5) coefficient ranking; 6) drawing of lots.

== Elite round ==
=== Draw ===
The draw for the elite round was held on 29 November 2019, 11:40 CET (UTC+1), at the UEFA headquarters in Nyon, Switzerland.

The teams were seeded according to their results in the qualifying round. Spain and Germany, which received byes to the elite round, were automatically seeded into Pot A. Each group contained one team from Pot A, one team from Pot B, one team from Pot C, and one team from Pot D. Winners and runners-up from the same qualifying round group could not be drawn in the same group, but the best third-placed teams could be drawn in the same group as winners or runners-up from the same qualifying round group. Based on the decisions taken by the UEFA Emergency Panel, Russia and Ukraine could not be drawn in the same group.

Pos	Grp	Team	Pld	W	D	L	GF	GA	GD	Pts	Seeding
1	—	Spain	0	0	0	0	0	0	0	0	Pot A
2	—	Germany	0	0	0	0	0	0	0	0	Pot A
3	5	Norway	3	3	0	0	22	0	+22	9 (Note: Ranked on disciplinary points: Norway 0, Switzerland –2.)	Pot A
4	2	Switzerland	3	3	0	0	22	0	+22	9	Pot A
5	7	Republic of Ireland	3	3	0	0	21	0	+21	9	Pot A
6	3	France	3	3	0	0	18	0	+18	9 (Note: Ranked on disciplinary points: France –1, Hungary –4.)	Pot A
7	9	Hungary	3	3	0	0	18	0	+18	9	Pot A
8	4	Austria	3	3	0	0	18	1	+17	9	Pot B
9	10	Italy	3	3	0	0	10	0	+10	9	Pot B
10	6	Russia	3	3	0	0	12	3	+9	9	Pot B
11	1	England	3	3	0	0	10	1	+9	9	Pot B
12	11	Netherlands	3	2	1	0	9	1	+8	7	Pot B
13	11	Portugal	3	2	1	0	9	2	+7	7	Pot B
14	8	Czech Republic	3	2	1	0	7	2	+5	7	Pot B
15	9	Poland	3	2	0	1	14	2	+12	6	Pot C
16	4	Slovakia	3	2	0	1	15	6	+9	6	Pot C
17	3	Iceland	3	2	0	1	11	4	+7	6	Pot C
18	5	Slovenia	3	2	0	1	10	5	+5	6	Pot C
19	8	Serbia	3	2	0	1	8	4	+4	6	Pot C
20	10	Scotland	3	2	0	1	8	5	+3	6	Pot C
21	7	Greece	3	2	0	1	4	5	−1	6	Pot C
22	6	Denmark	3	1	1	1	14	4	+10	4	Pot D
23	2	Turkey	3	1	1	1	8	8	0	4	Pot D
24	1	Belgium	3	1	1	1	4	6	−2	4	Pot D
25	6	Wales (Y)	3	1	1	1	1	3	−2	4	Pot D
26	2	Romania (Y)	3	1	1	1	6	12	−6	4	Pot D
27	1	Croatia (Y)	3	1	0	2	1	3	−2	3	Pot D
28	8	Ukraine (Y)	3	0	2	1	4	6	−2	2	Pot D

Source: UEFA
Rules for classification: 1) points; 2) goal difference; 3) goals scored; 4) disciplinary points; 5) coefficient ranking; 6) drawing of lots.
(Y) Third-placed teams from qualifying round (may be drawn with teams from same qualifying round group)

=== Groups ===
The elite round was originally scheduled to be played between 14 and 29 March 2020. On 12 March 2020, UEFA announced that the elite round had been postponed due to the COVID-19 pandemic. On 17 June 2020, UEFA announced that the elite round had been rescheduled to 12–21 September 2020. However, UEFA announced on 13 August 2020 that after consultation with the 55 member associations, the tournament had been cancelled.

Times are CEST (UTC+2), as listed by UEFA (local times, if different, are in parentheses).

==== Group 1 ====
Originally scheduled to be played between 22 and 28 March 2020.

Pos	Team	Pld	W	D	L	GF	GA	GD	Pts	Qualification
1	Switzerland	0	0	0	0	0	0	0	0	Final tournament
2	Italy	0	0	0	0	0	0	0	0	
3	Greece	0	0	0	0	0	0	0	0	
4	Belgium (H)	0	0	0	0	0	0	0	0	

First match(es) will be played: 13 September 2020. Source: UEFA
Rules for classification: Tiebreakers
(H) Hosts
13 September 2020
11:00

Switzerland	Cancelled	Belgium
	Report

Stade Fallon, Brussels
13 September 2020
16:00

Greece	Cancelled	Italy
	Report

Stade Fallon, Brussels

16 September 2020
11:00

Switzerland	Cancelled	Greece
	Report

King Baudouin Stadium, Brussels
16 September 2020
16:00

Italy	Cancelled	Belgium
	Report

King Baudouin Stadium, Brussels

19 September 2020
13:00

Italy	Cancelled	Switzerland
	Report

Stade Fallon, Brussels
19 September 2020
13:00

Belgium	Cancelled	Greece
	Report

King Baudouin Stadium, Brussels

==== Group 2 ====
Originally scheduled to be played between 18 and 24 March 2020.

Pos	Team	Pld	W	D	L	GF	GA	GD	Pts	Qualification
1	Hungary (H)	0	0	0	0	0	0	0	0	Final tournament
2	Russia	0	0	0	0	0	0	0	0	
3	Iceland	0	0	0	0	0	0	0	0	
4	Romania	0	0	0	0	0	0	0	0	

First match(es) will be played: 14 September 2020. Source: UEFA
Rules for classification: Tiebreakers
(H) Hosts
14 September 2020
12:30

Iceland	Cancelled	Russia
	Report

Rohonci út, Szombathely
14 September 2020
15:45

Hungary	Cancelled	Romania
	Report

Rohonci út, Szombathely

17 September 2020
14:00

Hungary	Cancelled	Iceland
	Report

Rohonci út, Szombathely
17 September 2020
14:00

Russia	Cancelled	Romania
	Report

Király Sportlétesítmény, Szombathely

20 September 2020
16:00

Russia	Cancelled	Hungary
	Report

Rohonci út, Szombathely
20 September 2020
16:00

Romania	Cancelled	Iceland
	Report

Király Sportlétesítmény, Szombathely

==== Group 3 ====
Originally scheduled to be played between 23 and 29 March 2020.

Pos	Team	Pld	W	D	L	GF	GA	GD	Pts	Qualification
1	Republic of Ireland (H)	0	0	0	0	0	0	0	0	Final tournament
2	Austria	0	0	0	0	0	0	0	0	
3	Serbia	0	0	0	0	0	0	0	0	
4	Denmark	0	0	0	0	0	0	0	0	

First match(es) will be played: 13 September 2020. Source: UEFA
Rules for classification: Tiebreakers
(H) Hosts
13 September 2020
13:00 (12:00 IST)

Serbia	Cancelled	Austria
	Report

Waterford Regional Sports Centre, Waterford
13 September 2020
20:00 (19:00 IST)

Republic of Ireland	Cancelled	Denmark
	Report

Waterford Regional Sports Centre, Waterford

16 September 2020
13:00 (12:00 IST)

Austria	Cancelled	Denmark
	Report

Ferrycarrig Park, Wexford
16 September 2020
19:00 (18:00 IST)

Republic of Ireland	Cancelled	Serbia
	Report

Waterford Regional Sports Centre, Waterford

19 September 2020
13:00 (12:00 IST)

Austria	Cancelled	Republic of Ireland
	Report

Waterford Regional Sports Centre, Waterford
19 September 2020
13:00 (12:00 IST)

Denmark	Cancelled	Serbia
	Report

Ferrycarrig Park, Wexford

==== Group 4 ====
Originally scheduled to be played between 14 and 20 March 2020.

Pos	Team	Pld	W	D	L	GF	GA	GD	Pts	Qualification
1	Germany	0	0	0	0	0	0	0	0	Final tournament
2	Netherlands (H)	0	0	0	0	0	0	0	0	
3	Scotland	0	0	0	0	0	0	0	0	
4	Croatia	0	0	0	0	0	0	0	0	

First match(es) will be played: 12 September 2020. Source: UEFA
Rules for classification: Tiebreakers
(H) Hosts
12 September 2020

Germany	Cancelled	Croatia
	Report

Sportpark Het Midden, Vriezenveen
12 September 2020

Scotland	Cancelled	Netherlands
	Report

Sportpark Vondersweijde, Oldenzaal

15 September 2020

Germany	Cancelled	Scotland
	Report

Sportpark Vondersweijde, Oldenzaal
15 September 2020

Netherlands	Cancelled	Croatia
	Report

Sportpark Het Midden, Vriezenveen

18 September 2020

Netherlands	Cancelled	Germany
	Report

Sportpark Vondersweijde, Oldenzaal
18 September 2020

Croatia	Cancelled	Scotland
	Report

Sportpark Het Midden, Vriezenveen

==== Group 5 ====
Originally scheduled to be played between 16 and 22 March 2020.

Pos	Team	Pld	W	D	L	GF	GA	GD	Pts	Qualification
1	France	0	0	0	0	0	0	0	0	Final tournament
2	England (H)	0	0	0	0	0	0	0	0	
3	Slovakia	0	0	0	0	0	0	0	0	
4	Wales	0	0	0	0	0	0	0	0	

First match(es) will be played: 13 September 2020. Source: UEFA
Rules for classification: Tiebreakers
(H) Hosts
13 September 2020
14:00 (13:00 BST)

Slovakia	Cancelled	England
	Report

St George's Park pitch 5, Burton upon Trent
13 September 2020
17:30 (16:30 BST)

France	Cancelled	Wales
	Report

St George's Park pitch 5, Burton upon Trent

16 September 2020
13:00 (12:00 BST)

France	Cancelled	Slovakia
	Report

St George's Park pitch 1, Burton upon Trent
16 September 2020
17:30 (16:30 BST)

England	Cancelled	Wales
	Report

St George's Park pitch 5, Burton upon Trent

19 September 2020
13:00 (12:00 BST)

England	Cancelled	France
	Report

St George's Park pitch 5, Burton upon Trent
19 September 2020
13:00 (12:00 BST)

Wales	Cancelled	Slovakia
	Report

St George's Park pitch 1, Burton upon Trent

==== Group 6 ====
Originally scheduled to be played between 19 and 25 March 2020.

Pos	Team	Pld	W	D	L	GF	GA	GD	Pts	Qualification
1	Spain	0	0	0	0	0	0	0	0	Final tournament
2	Portugal (H)	0	0	0	0	0	0	0	0	
3	Slovenia	0	0	0	0	0	0	0	0	
4	Turkey	0	0	0	0	0	0	0	0	

First match(es) will be played: 14 September 2020. Source: UEFA
Rules for classification: Tiebreakers
(H) Hosts
14 September 2020
14:45 (13:45 WEST)

Spain	Cancelled	Turkey
	Report

Complexo Desportivo da Tocha, Tocha
14 September 2020
16:45 (15:45 WEST)

Slovenia	Cancelled	Portugal
	Report

Centro de Treino, Luso

17 September 2020
14:45 (13:45 WEST)

Spain	Cancelled	Slovenia
	Report

Complexo Desportivo da Tocha, Tocha
17 September 2020
16:45 (15:45 WEST)

Portugal	Cancelled	Turkey
	Report

Estádio Municipal Carlos Duarte, Pampilhosa

20 September 2020
16:00 (15:00 WEST)

Portugal	Cancelled	Spain
	Report

Centro de Treino, Luso
20 September 2020
16:00 (15:00 WEST)

Turkey	Cancelled	Slovenia
	Report

Estádio Municipal Dr. Américo Couto, Mealhada

==== Group 7 ====
Originally scheduled to be played between 23 and 29 March 2020.

Pos	Team	Pld	W	D	L	GF	GA	GD	Pts	Qualification
1	Norway (H)	0	0	0	0	0	0	0	0	Final tournament
2	Czech Republic	0	0	0	0	0	0	0	0	
3	Poland	0	0	0	0	0	0	0	0	
4	Ukraine	0	0	0	0	0	0	0	0	

First match(es) will be played: 15 September 2020. Source: UEFA
Rules for classification: Tiebreakers
(H) Hosts
15 September 2020
13:00

Poland	Cancelled	Czech Republic
	Report

Klepp Stadion, Kleppe
15 September 2020
17:30

Norway	Cancelled	Ukraine
	Report

Klepp Stadion, Kleppe

18 September 2020
13:00

Czech Republic	Cancelled	Ukraine
	Report

Klepp Stadion, Kleppe
18 September 2020
17:30

Norway	Cancelled	Poland
	Report

Klepp Stadion, Kleppe

21 September 2020
13:00

Czech Republic	Cancelled	Norway
	Report

Viking Stadion, Stavanger
21 September 2020
13:00

Ukraine	Cancelled	Poland
	Report

Klepp Stadion, Kleppe

== Qualified teams ==
The following eight teams qualify for the final tournament.

Team	Qualified as	Qualified on	Previous appearances in Women's Under-17 Euro^{1}
Sweden	Hosts	9 December 2016	1 (2013)
TBD	Elite round Group 1 winners	19 September 2020 (or 16 September 2020)	
TBD	Elite round Group 2 winners	20 September 2020 (or 17 September 2020)	
TBD	Elite round Group 3 winners	19 September 2020 (or 16 September 2020)	
TBD	Elite round Group 4 winners	18 September 2020 (or 15 September 2020)	
TBD	Elite round Group 5 winners	19 September 2020 (or 16 September 2020)	
TBD	Elite round Group 6 winners	20 September 2020 (or 17 September 2020)	
TBD	Elite round Group 7 winners	21 September 2020 (or 18 September 2020)	

^{1} Bold indicates champions for that year. Italic indicates hosts for that year.

== Goalscorers ==
- In the qualifying round, there were 318 goals scored in 66 matches, for an average of 4.82 goals per match.

7 goals

- (Hungary) Emőke Pápai
- (Norway) Karoline Nagelhus Hernes

6 goals

- (Netherlands) Esmee Brugts

5 goals

- (Austria) Julia Magerl
- (Iceland) Bryndís Arna Níelsdóttir
- (Norway) Iris Omarsdottir
- (Republic of Ireland) Erin McLaughlin
- (Slovakia) Karin Pelikánová
- (Slovenia) Manca Suhoversnik
- (Switzerland) Alena Bienz

4 goals

- (Denmark) Sophie Gravesen
- (France) Laurina Fazer
- (Hungary) Cecília Mészáros
- (Iceland) Hildigunnur Ýr Benediktsdóttir
- (Poland) Natalia Wróbel
- (Republic of Ireland) Kerryanne Brown
- (Scotland) Rosie McQuillan
- (Slovakia) Tamara Morávková
- (Switzerland) Serena Li Puma

3 goals

- (Austria) Chiara Anna D'Angelo
- (Austria) Patricia Pfanner
- (Austria) Lilli Purtscheller
- (Denmark) Emma Veletanlic
- (France) Noémie Mouchon
- (France) Manssita Traoré
- (Greece) Ioanna Papatheodorou
- (Portugal) Inês Oliveira
- (Republic of Ireland) Aoibheann Clancy
- (Romania) Adina Cristina Borodi
- (Russia) Alana Chochieva
- (Russia) Natalya Trofimova
- (Slovakia) Tamara Jedináková
- (Switzerland) Alayah Pilgrim
- (Switzerland) Rilana Ueltschi
- (Turkey) Mesude Alayont
- (Turkey) Berivan Içen

2 goals

- (Belgium) Imani Prez
- (Belgium) Luna Vanzeir
- (Bulgaria) Dimitra Ivanova
- (Czech Republic) Kim Dinh Thanhová
- (Denmark) Malou Marcetto Rylov
- (Denmark) Sarah Katrine Thygesen
- (England) Maria Edwards
- (England) Lucy Watson
- (Finland) Oona Sevenius
- (France) Laurine Hannequin
- (Hungary) Csilla Savanya
- (Italy) Nicole Arcangeli
- (Italy) Chiara Beccari
- (Italy) Alice Ilaria Berti
- (Italy) Emma Severini
- (Moldova) Mihaela Gamarț
- (Northern Ireland) Cora Morgan
- (Norway) Synne Amdahl Brønstad
- (Norway) Linnéa Solvoll Laupstad
- (Poland) Wiktoria Kiszkis
- (Poland) Nadia Krezyman
- (Poland) Magdalena Sobal
- (Republic of Ireland) Rebecca Watkins
- (Romania) Cristina Daniela Botojel
- (Russia) Elizaveta Semenova
- (Scotland) Bayley Hutchison
- (Serbia) Milica Andrić
- (Serbia) Anastasija Ćirić
- (Slovakia) Laura Retkesová
- (Slovenia) Nina Mele
- (Switzerland) Selina Ueltschi
- (Turkey) Zeynep Kerimoğlu
- (Ukraine) Anastasiia Dovhanyk

1 goal

- (Albania) Iris Armoku
- (Austria) Katja Dorn
- (Austria) Caroline Fritsch
- (Austria) Vanessa Kraker
- (Austria) Vanessa Praher
- (Belarus) Anastasiya Pobegaylo
- (Belarus) Milana Surovtseva
- (Bosnia and Herzegovina) Sydney Grace Japić
- (Bosnia and Herzegovina) Marija Ana Milinković
- (Bulgaria) Bozhidara Ivanova
- (Bulgaria) Vanesa Ivanova
- (Bulgaria) Zdravka Parapunova
- (Bulgaria) Yana Yordanova
- (Croatia) Lana Novak
- (Czech Republic) Julia-Lani Csordás
- (Czech Republic) Andrea Holá
- (Czech Republic) Andrea Kochanová
- (Czech Republic) Terezie Ohlídalová
- (Czech Republic) Sabina Střížová
- (Denmark) Signe Timmermann Clausen
- (Denmark) Klara Ulrikke Hornsleth
- (Denmark) Mathilde Carøe Vistisen
- (England) Agnes Beever-Jones
- (England) Ruby Mace
- (England) Emily Murphy
- (England) Lucy O'Brien
- (England) Maisie Symonds
- (Estonia) Sandra Pärn
- (Estonia) Kristina Teern
- (Faroe Islands) Judith Eilersdóttir Rasmussen
- (Finland) Wilma Forsblom
- (Finland) Sofia Määttä
- (Finland) Aada Nurmi
- (France) Naomie Bamenga Bofenda
- (France) Cyrielle Blanc
- (France) Judith Coquet
- (France) Inès Kbida
- (France) Maelys Mpomé
- (France) Safia Tall
- (Georgia (country)) Natia Danelia
- (Greece) Maria Kokmotou
- (Hungary) Blanka Bokor
- (Hungary) Glória Siber
- (Hungary) Boglárka Vida
- (Iceland) Amanda Jacobsen Andradóttir
- (Iceland) Þórhildur Þórhallsdóttir
- (Israel) Maria Almasri
- (Israel) Shaked Horvitz
- (Italy) Maria Letizia Musolino
- (Italy) Matilde Pavan
- (Latvia) Vlada Kozlova
- (Lithuania) Rimantė Jonušaitė
- (Lithuania) Gabija Valiukevičiūtė
- (Malta) Veronique Mifsud
- (Montenegro) Marijana Cimbaljević
- (Netherlands) Elisha Nana-Ama Kruize
- (Netherlands) Danique Noordman
- (Netherlands) Anne Jet van der Veen
- (Norway) Emma Braut Brunes
- (Norway) Irene Dirdal
- (Norway) Selma Løvås
- (Norway) Elise Lundblad
- (Norway) Tora Ose
- (Norway) Thea Helene Gammelgaard Sørbo
- (Poland) Karolina Czyż
- (Poland) Anna Kodym
- (Poland) Maja Szydełko
- (Portugal) Vitória Estrela Almeida
- (Portugal) Ana Assucena
- (Portugal) Alícia Correia
- (Portugal) Maria Miller
- (Portugal) Maria Negrão
- (Republic of Ireland) Muireann Devaney
- (Republic of Ireland) Della Doherty
- (Republic of Ireland) Aoife Horgan
- (Republic of Ireland) Ellen Molloy
- (Republic of Ireland) Kate O'Dowd
- (Republic of Ireland) Laura Shine
- (Republic of Ireland) Kate Slevin
- (Romania) Ioana Maria Nicoleta Bălăceanu
- (Russia) Nika Belova
- (Russia) Dayna Kishmakhova
- (Russia) Zarina Sharifova
- (Russia) Snezhana Stepanova
- (Scotland) Paige McAllister
- (Scotland) Robyn McCafferty
- (Serbia) Mina Čavić
- (Serbia) Emilija Kucinar
- (Serbia) Natalija Obradović
- (Serbia) Jana Stevanović
- (Slovakia) Katarína Vredíková
- (Slovenia) Patricija Ham
- (Slovenia) Nina Kajzba
- (Slovenia) Selma Šabotič
- (Switzerland) Emeline von Dach
- (Switzerland) Simea Hefti
- (Switzerland) Ella Touon
- (Switzerland) Jennifer Wyss
- (Ukraine) Nadiia Ivanchenko
- (Ukraine) Anna Kaverzina
- (Wales) Mary McAteer

1 own goal

- (Croatia) Tara Verbanac (against England)
- (Kazakhstan) Alyona Ivanova (against Poland)
- (Kazakhstan) Olga Plotnikova (against Hungary)
- (Kazakhstan) Tatyana Sosnovskaya (against Hungary)
- (Latvia) Jekaterina Ovsjankina (against Israel)
- (Moldova) Nina Darenscaia (against Switzerland)
- (Israel) Maia Sirota (against Portugal)

2 own goals

- (Slovakia) Sára Kršiaková (1 against Finland and 1 against Estonia)
