= Romania women's national under-17 football team =

Romania Women's U-17
- Nickname: Tricolorele (The Tricolours)
- Association: Romanian Football Federation
- Confederation: UEFA (Europe)
- Head coach: (Romania) Ionuț Florea
- Captain: (Romania) Aida Bucșa
- Top scorer: (Romania) -6 Lunca
- FIFA code: ROU
First colours	Second colours	Third colours

First international
- Romania 0–7 Wales (Buftea, Romania, October 21, 2008)

Biggest win
- Romania 6–1 North Macedonia (Strumica, Macedonia; October 15, 2011)

Biggest defeat
- Romania 0–13 Sweden (Mogoșoaia, Romania; October 14, 2015)

The Romania women's national under-17 football team is the national under-17 football team of Romania and is governed by the Romanian Football Federation.

== Competitive record ==
=== FIFA U-17 Women's World Cup ===
The team has never qualified for the FIFA U-17 Women's World Cup.

Year	Result	Matches	Wins	Draws*	Losses	GF	GA
(New Zealand) 2008	did not qualify						
(Trinidad and Tobago) 2010	did not qualify						
(Azerbaijan) 2012	did not qualify						
(Costa Rica) 2014	did not qualify						
(Jordan) 2016	did not qualify						
(Uruguay) 2018	did not qualify						
(India) 2022	did not qualify						
(Dominican Republic) 2024	did not qualify						
(Morocco) 2025	did not qualify						
Total	0/9	0	0	0	0	0	0

=== UEFA Women's Under-17 Championship ===
The team has never qualified for the UEFA Women's Under-17 Championship

Year	Result	MP	W	D	L	GF	GA
(Switzerland) 2008	did not qualify						
(Switzerland) 2009	did not qualify						
(Switzerland) 2010	did not qualify						
(Switzerland) 2011	did not qualify						
(Switzerland) 2012	did not qualify						
(Switzerland) 2013	did not qualify						
(England) 2014	did not qualify						
(Iceland) 2015	did not qualify						
(Belarus) 2016	did not qualify						
(Czech Republic) 2017	did not qualify						
(Lithuania) 2018	did not qualify						
(Bulgaria) 2019	did not qualify						
(Sweden) ~~2020~~	Cancelled						
(Faroe Islands) ~~2021~~	Cancelled						
(Bosnia and Herzegovina) 2022	did not qualify						
(Estonia) 2023	did not qualify						
(Sweden) 2024	did not qualify						
(Faroe Islands) 2025	did not qualify						
(Northern Ireland) 2026	did not qualify						
(Finland) 2027	to be determined						
(Belgium) 2028	to be determined						
(Turkey) 2029	to be determined						
Total	0/16	0	0	0	0	0	0

== Results at official competitions ==
Friendly matches are not included. Win Draw Loss

Competition	No.	Date	Location	Opponent	Result	Scorers
2009 UEFA U-17 Championship
2009 UEFA Championship; First qualifying round Group 9 Romania
2009 UEFA Championship; First qualifying round Group 9 Romania	1	Oct 21, 2008	Buftea	Wales	0–7	
2009 UEFA Championship; First qualifying round Group 9 Romania	2	Oct 23, 2008	Buftea	Spain	0–7	
2009 UEFA Championship; First qualifying round Group 9 Romania	3	Oct 26, 2008	Buftea	Croatia	1-1	Vătafu 63' (pen.)
2010 UEFA U-17 Championship
2010 UEFA Championship; First qualifying round Group 5 Poland
2010 UEFA Championship; First qualifying round Group 5 Poland	4	Oct 22, 2009	Rzeszów	Belgium	1–3	Vătafu 46' (pen.)
2010 UEFA Championship; First qualifying round Group 5 Poland	5	Oct 24, 2009	Rzeszów	Poland	0–3	
2010 UEFA Championship; First qualifying round Group 5 Poland	6	Oct 27, 2009	Rzeszów	Bulgaria	1-0	Miklos 80+1'
2011 UEFA U-17 Championship
2011 UEFA Championship; First qualifying round Group 7 Austria
2011 UEFA Championship; First qualifying round Group 7 Austria	7	Oct 6, 2010	Lindabrunn	Scotland	0–1	
2011 UEFA Championship; First qualifying round Group 7 Austria	8	Oct 8, 2010	Neulengbach	Ukraine	2-0	Cosma 40', 72'
2011 UEFA Championship; First qualifying round Group 7 Austria	9	Oct 11, 2010	Neulengbach	Austria	0-0	
2012 UEFA U-17 Championship
2012 UEFA Championship; First qualifying round Group 2 North Macedonia
2012 UEFA Championship; First qualifying round Group 2 North Macedonia	10	Oct 10, 2011	Strumica	Republic of Ireland	2–3	Lunca 57', Nica 80+3'
2012 UEFA Championship; First qualifying round Group 2 North Macedonia	11	Oct 12, 2011	Strumica	Italy	3-2	Obreja 16', Lunca 30', Cosma 78'
2012 UEFA Championship; First qualifying round Group 2 North Macedonia	12	Oct 15, 2011	Strumica	North Macedonia	6-1	Lunca 4', 14', 20', 71', Obreja 46', Filler 63'
2013 UEFA U-17 Championship
2013 UEFA Championship; First qualifying round Group 7 Greece
2013 UEFA Championship; First qualifying round Group 7 Greece	13	Oct 29, 2012	Thessaloniki	Russia	1–6	Bistrian 35'
2013 UEFA Championship; First qualifying round Group 7 Greece	14	Oct 31, 2012	Thessaloniki	Germany	0–5	
2013 UEFA Championship; First qualifying round Group 7 Greece	15	Nov 3, 2012	Thessaloniki	Greece	0–1	
2014 UEFA U-17 Championship
2014 UEFA Championship; First qualifying round Group 2 Estonia
2014 UEFA Championship; First qualifying round Group 2 Estonia	16	Jul 29, 2013	Tallinn	Estonia	5-0	Petre 10', Ciolacu 18', Vasile 58', 68', Indrei 65'
2014 UEFA Championship; First qualifying round Group 2 Estonia	17	Jul 31, 2013	Tallinn	Croatia	2-1	Ciolacu 10', Ambruș 48'
2014 UEFA Championship; First qualifying round Group 2 Estonia	18	Aug 3, 2013	Tallinn	Norway	0–4	
2014 UEFA Championship; Second qualifying round Group 1 Romania
2014 UEFA Championship; Second qualifying round Group 1 Romania	19	Sep 30, 2013	Mogoșoaia	Iceland	1–2	Ambruș 48'
2014 UEFA Championship; Second qualifying round Group 1 Romania	20	Oct 2, 2013	Mogoșoaia	Spain	0–8	
2014 UEFA Championship; Second qualifying round Group 1 Romania	21	Oct 5, 2013	Mogoșoaia	Republic of Ireland	0–4	
2015 UEFA U-17 Championship
2015 UEFA Championship; Qualifying round Group 4 Serbia
2015 UEFA Championship; Qualifying round Group 4 Serbia	22	Oct 17, 2014	Subotica	Serbia	1-1	Golubović 8' (o.g.)
2015 UEFA Championship; Qualifying round Group 4 Serbia	23	Oct 19, 2014	Subotica	Republic of Ireland	0–2	
2015 UEFA Championship; Qualifying round Group 4 Serbia	24	Oct 22, 2014	Subotica	Lithuania	3-3	Indrei 8', 59', 71'
2015 UEFA Championship; Elite round Group 4 Russia
2015 UEFA Championship; Elite round Group 4 Russia	25	Mar 22, 2015	Sochi	Belgium	0–5	
2015 UEFA Championship; Elite round Group 4 Russia	26	Mar 24, 2015	Sochi	Spain	0–5	
2015 UEFA Championship; Elite round Group 4 Russia	27	Mar 27, 2015	Sochi	Russia	5-2	Petre 37', Ciolacu 42', 56', 69', Meluță 73'
2016 UEFA U-17 Championship
2016 UEFA Championship; Qualifying round Group 8 Romania
2016 UEFA Championship; Qualifying round Group 8 Romania	28	Oct 12, 2015	Mogoșoaia	Russia	0–4	
2016 UEFA Championship; Qualifying round Group 8 Romania	29	Oct 14, 2015	Mogoșoaia	Sweden	0–13	
2016 UEFA Championship; Qualifying round Group 8 Romania	30	Oct 17, 2015	Mogoșoaia	Slovakia	0–5	
2017 UEFA U-17 Championship
2017 UEFA Championship; Qualifying round Group 9 Serbia
2017 UEFA Championship; Qualifying round Group 9 Serbia	31	Sep 12, 2016	Stara Pazova	Serbia	0–1	
2017 UEFA Championship; Qualifying round Group 9 Serbia	32	Sep 28, 2016	Stara Pazova	Belgium	1-0	Sfiea 16'
2017 UEFA Championship; Qualifying round Group 9 Serbia	33	Oct 1, 2016	Pećinci	Ukraine	1–2	Boroș 58' (pen.)
2018 UEFA U-17 Championship
2018 UEFA Championship; Qualifying round Group 4 Bosnia and Herzegovina
2018 UEFA Championship; Qualifying round Group 4 Bosnia and Herzegovina	34	Sep 24, 2017	Zenica	Greece	1-1	Marcu 5'
2018 UEFA Championship; Qualifying round Group 4 Bosnia and Herzegovina	35	Sep 27, 2017	Zenica	Republic of Ireland	0–2	
2018 UEFA Championship; Qualifying round Group 4 Bosnia and Herzegovina	36	Sep 30, 2017	Zenica	Bosnia and Herzegovina	0–1	
2018 UEFA Championship; Elite round Group 1 Netherlands
2018 UEFA Championship; Elite round Group 1 Netherlands	37	Mar 23, 2018	Zaltbommel	Netherlands	0–2	
2018 UEFA Championship; Elite round Group 1 Netherlands	38	Mar 26, 2018	Zaltbommel	Belgium	0–6	
2018 UEFA Championship; Elite round Group 1 Netherlands	39	Mar 29, 2018	Aalburg	Portugal	0–8	
2019 UEFA U-17 Championship
2019 UEFA Championship; Qualifying round Group 3 Montenegro
2019 UEFA Championship; Qualifying round Group 3 Montenegro	40	Oct 22, 2018	Golubovci	Finland	0–4	
2019 UEFA Championship; Qualifying round Group 3 Montenegro	41	Oct 25, 2018	Nikšić	Italy	0–1	
2019 UEFA Championship; Qualifying round Group 3 Montenegro	42	Oct 28, 2018	Podgorica	Montenegro	2-1	Pană 38', Dimulescu 90+2'
2020 UEFA U-17 Championship
2020 UEFA Championship; Qualifying round Group 2 Moldova
2020 UEFA Championship; Qualifying round Group 2 Moldova	43	Sep 19, 2019	Orhei	Turkey	4-4	Botojel 12', A. Borodi 49', 56', Bălăceanu 75'
2020 UEFA Championship; Qualifying round Group 2 Moldova	44	Sep 22, 2019	Orhei	Switzerland	0–8	
2020 UEFA Championship; Qualifying round Group 2 Moldova	45	Sep 25, 2019	Chișinău	Moldova	2-0	Botojel 52' (pen.), A. Borodi 87'
2020 UEFA Championship; Elite round Group 2 Hungary
2020 UEFA Championship; Elite round Group 2 Hungary	–	Sep 14, 2020	Szombathely	Hungary	canc.	
2020 UEFA Championship; Elite round Group 2 Hungary	–	Sep 17, 2020	Szombathely	Russia	canc.	
2020 UEFA Championship; Elite round Group 2 Hungary	–	Sep 20, 2020	Szombathely	Iceland	canc.	
2021 UEFA U-17 Championship
2021 UEFA Championship; Qualifying round Group 9 Albania
2021 UEFA Championship; Qualifying round Group 9 Albania	–	Feb 7, 2021		Sweden	canc.	
2021 UEFA Championship; Qualifying round Group 9 Albania	–	Feb 10, 2021		Netherlands	canc.	
2021 UEFA Championship; Qualifying round Group 9 Albania	–	Feb 13, 2021		Albania	canc.	
2022 UEFA U-17 Championship
2022 UEFA Championship; Round 1, League B Group B5 Turkey
2022 UEFA Championship; Round 1, League B Group B5 Turkey	46	Sep 30, 2021	Manavgat	Turkey	2–2	Filip 13', Roșu 39'
2022 UEFA Championship; Round 1, League B Group B5 Turkey	47	Oct 3, 2021	Manavgat	Latvia	3–1	Filip 51', 65', Roșu 61' (pen.)
2022 UEFA Championship; Round 2, League A Group A3 Norway
2022 UEFA Championship; Round 2, League A Group A3 Norway	48	Mar 24, 2022	Sandnes	Sweden	1–5	Pînzariu 62'
2022 UEFA Championship; Round 2, League A Group A3 Norway	49	Mar 27, 2022	Sandnes	Norway	0–12	
2022 UEFA Championship; Round 2, League A Group A3 Norway	50	Mar 30, 2022	Stavanger	Serbia	0–8	

== Top goalscorers in the European Championships ==
As of 30 March 2022.

No	Name	Goals
1	Alexandra Lunca	6
2	Mihaela Ciolacu	5
3	Dariana Indrei	4
4	Loredana Cosma	3
4	Adina Borodi	3
4	Anamaria Filip	3
7	Ștefania Vătafu	2
7	Iulia Obreja	2
7	Anamaria Vasile	2
7	Beata Ambruș	2
7	Cristina Botojel	2
7	Clara Roșu	2

== Results and fixtures ==
26 November 2025	Austria	0–0	Romania	Football Centre FRF, Buftea
11:00		Report		Referee: Ioanna Allayiotou (Cyprus)

2 December 2025	Romania	1–1	Ukraine	Football Centre FRF, Buftea
11:00	Crisan 85'	Report	Lespukh 73'	Referee: Ioanna Allayiotou (Cyprus)

29 November 2025	Switzerland	2–1	Romania	Football Centre FRF, Buftea
15:00	Steffen 48'; Leutwyler 63'	Report	Cojanu 3'	Referee: Filipa Pereira Cunha (Portugal)

9 March 2026	Romania	0–5	Czech Republic	Letní stadion, Chomutov
14:00		Report	Kynclová 45+3'; Řehová 51'; Volhejnová 69'; Pešková 77', 82'	Referee: Liudmyla Telbukh (Ukraine)

12 March 2026	Finland	3–0	Romania	FK Chmel, Blšany
11:00	Oulasvirta 42'; Ylätalo 79'; Ahonen 82'	Report		Referee: Melissa Burgin (England)

15 March 2026	Latvia	1–4	Romania	FK Chmel, Blšany
14:00	Haritonova 8'	Report	Candea 18', 65'; Colibaba 69'; Bucșa 90+5' (pen.)	Referee: Paola Cebollada López (Spain)

7 October 2026	Romania	0–3	Scotland	Broadwood Stadium, Cumbernauld
16:30		Report	Hope 14', 21'; Morrow 75'	Attendance: 142; Referee: Teresa Oliveira (Portugal)

10 October 2026	Finland	4–0	Romania	Excelsior Stadium, Airdrie
12:00	Kossila 2', 10'; Sallinen 13'; Varis 90+1'	Report		Attendance: 17; Referee: Lovisa Johansson (Sweden)

== Coaching staff ==
=== Current coaching staff ===
Role	Name
Head coach	Ionuț Florea
Assistant coach	
Goalkeeping coach	
Physical coach	
