= Moldova women's national under-17 football team =

Moldova Women's U-17
- Association: FMF
- Confederation: UEFA (Europe)
- Head coach: Elena Subbotina
- FIFA code: MDA
First colours	Second colours

First international
- Official: Sweden 12–0 Moldova (Antalya, Turkey; 19 October 2007)

Biggest win
- Wales 0–1 Moldova (Vadul lui Vodă, Moldova; 14 October 2011); Moldova 2–1 Malta (Ta' Qali, Malta; 19 November 2024)

Biggest defeat
- Norway 14–0 Moldova (Kavarna, Bulgaria; 23 October 2015)

The Moldova women's national under-17 football team represents Moldova in international football at this age level and is controlled by the Moldovan Football Federation, the governing body for football in Moldova. The team is considered to be the feeder team for the senior Moldovan women's national football team. The team competes to qualify for the UEFA Women's Under-17 Championship held every year. Since the establishment of the Moldovan women's under-17 team, the under-17 side has never reached a final tournament of the UEFA Women's Under-17 Championship. Players born on or after 1 January 2010 are eligible for the 2027 UEFA Women's Under-17 Championship qualification. They are currently coached by Elena Subbotina.

== Competition history ==
=== UEFA U-17 European Championship ===
Hosted tournament Hosted qualifying

UEFA U-17 European Championship record										UEFA U-17 Qualification record								
Year	Round	Pld	W	D	L	GF	GA	GD	Squad	Pld	W	D	L	GF	GA	GD	Campaign	
(Switzerland) 2008	Did not qualify									3	0	0	3	0	24	−24	2008	
(Switzerland) 2009	Did not qualify									3	0	0	3	0	25	−25	2009	
(Switzerland) 2010	Did not qualify									3	0	0	3	1	16	−15	2010	
(Switzerland) 2011	Did not qualify									3	0	0	3	1	13	−12	2011	
(Switzerland) 2012	Did not qualify									3	1	0	2	2	9	−7	2012	
(Switzerland) 2013	Did not qualify									3	0	0	3	0	17	−17	2013	
(England) 2014	Did not qualify									3	0	1	2	1	12	−11	2014	
(Iceland) 2015	Did not qualify									3	0	0	3	1	18	−17	2015	
(Belarus) 2016	Did not qualify									3	0	0	3	0	26	−26	2016	
(Czech Republic) 2017	Did not qualify									3	0	0	3	0	20	−20	2017	
(Lithuania) 2018	Did not qualify									3	0	0	3	0	13	−13	2018	
(Bulgaria) 2019	Did not qualify									3	0	1	2	1	13	−12	2019	
(Sweden) ~~2020~~	Did not qualify									3	0	0	3	2	18	−16	2020	
(Bosnia and Herzegovina) 2022	Did not qualify									5	0	0	5	0	33	−33	2022	2022
(Estonia) 2023	Did not qualify									6	0	0	6	1	36	−35	2023	2023
(Sweden) 2024	Did not qualify									5	0	1	4	6	25	−19	2024	2024
(Faroe Islands) 2025	Did not qualify									5	1	0	4	4	16	−12	2025	2025
(Northern Ireland) 2026	Did not qualify									5	0	3	2	4	9	−5	2026	2026
(Finland) 2027	Did not qualify									2	0	0	2	0	11	−11	2027	2027
(Belgium) 2028	To be determined									To be determined								
(Turkey) 2029	To be determined									To be determined								
Total	0/19									67	2	6	59	24	354	−330		

== 2027 UEFA Women's Under-17 Championship ==
=== Round 1 (League B) ===
Pos	Team	Pld	W	D	L	GF	GA	GD	Pts	Promotion
1	Greece	2	1	1	0	8	1	+7	4	Promotion to Round 2 (League A)
2	Slovenia (H)	2	1	1	0	5	1	+4	4	Transfer to Round 2 (League B)
3	Moldova	2	0	0	2	0	11	−11	0	Transfer to Round 2 (League B)

Source: UEFA
(H) Hosts
5 November 2026

Moldova	0–4	Slovenia
	Report	Drevenšek 2'; Velišček 17'; Žnuderl 57'; Gjergjek 68'

Terme Čatež, Čatež ob Savi
Referee: Senida Petak (Bosnia and Herzegovina)

8 November 2026

Greece	7–0	Moldova
Papadaki 7'; Kechagia 18', 70' (pen.); Bouronikou 42', 43', 51'; Lamprou 58'	Report

Terme Čatež, Čatež ob Savi
Referee: Tamta Shengelia (Georgia)

=== Round 2 (League B) ===
Pos	Team	Pld	W	D	L	GF	GA	GD	Pts	Promotion
1	Team	0	0	0	0	0	0	0	0	Promotion to League A for the next tournament qualification
2	Team	0	0	0	0	0	0	0	0	
3	Moldova	0	0	0	0	0	0	0	0	
4	Team	0	0	0	0	0	0	0	0	

Source: UEFA

== Head-to-head record ==
Friendly games are not included and correct as of last competitive match played on 8 November 2026.

Opponents	Pld	W	D	L	GF	GA	GD
Albania	1	0	0	1	1	9	−8
Andorra	0	0	0	0	0	0	0
Armenia	0	0	0	0	0	0	0
Austria	0	0	0	0	0	0	0
Azerbaijan	3	0	2	1	2	5	−3
Belarus	0	0	0	0	0	0	0
Belgium	2	0	0	2	0	15	−15
Bosnia and Herzegovina	1	0	0	1	0	5	−5
Bulgaria	6	0	0	6	0	15	−15
Croatia	0	0	0	0	0	0	0
Cyprus	0	0	0	0	0	0	0
Czechia	0	0	0	0	0	0	0
Denmark	1	0	0	1	0	6	−6
England	2	0	0	2	0	15	−15
Estonia	2	0	1	1	3	13	−10
Faroe Islands	2	0	0	2	0	7	−7
Finland	0	0	0	0	0	0	0
France	1	0	0	1	1	8	−7
Georgia	0	0	0	0	0	0	0
Germany	0	0	0	0	0	0	0
Gibraltar	0	0	0	0	0	0	0
Greece	2	0	0	2	0	12	−12
Hungary	4	0	0	4	1	27	−26
Iceland	2	0	0	2	0	12	−12
Ireland	1	0	0	1	0	5	−5
Israel	0	0	0	0	0	0	0
Italy	0	0	0	0	0	0	0
Kazakhstan	2	0	1	1	3	4	−1
Kosovo	2	0	0	2	0	10	−10
Latvia	1	0	1	0	1	1	0
Liechtenstein	0	0	0	0	0	0	0
Lithuania	2	0	0	2	0	8	−8
Luxembourg	0	0	0	0	0	0	0
Malta	1	1	0	0	2	1	+1
Montenegro	1	0	1	0	1	1	0
Netherlands	3	0	0	3	0	30	−30
North Macedonia	3	0	0	3	0	11	−11
Northern Ireland	0	0	0	0	0	0	0
Norway	3	0	0	3	0	29	−29
Poland	0	0	0	0	0	0	0
Portugal	0	0	0	0	0	0	0
Romania	2	0	0	2	1	5	−4
Russia	1	0	0	1	1	7	−6
San Marino	0	0	0	0	0	0	0
Scotland	0	0	0	0	0	0	0
Serbia	0	0	0	0	0	0	0
Slovakia	0	0	0	0	0	0	0
Slovenia	4	0	0	4	1	13	−12
Spain	0	0	0	0	0	0	0
Sweden	1	0	0	1	0	12	−12
Switzerland	2	0	0	2	0	20	−20
Turkey	3	0	0	3	4	17	−13
Ukraine	4	0	0	4	0	26	−26
Wales	2	1	0	1	2	5	−3
Total	67	2	6	59	24	354	−330

== See also ==
- Moldova women's national football team
- Moldova women's national under-19 football team
