= 2010 UEFA Women's Under-17 Championship =

Tournament details
- Host country: Switzerland
- Dates: 22–26 June
- Teams: 4

Final positions
- Champions: Spain (1st title)
- Runners-up: Republic of Ireland
- Third place: Germany
- Fourth place: Netherlands

The 2010 UEFA Women's Under-17 Championship football tournament took place between 8 April and 26 June. Germany was the defending champion. Spain won the final on penalties 4–1 against the Republic of Ireland.

Spain, Ireland and third placed Germany qualified to the 2010 FIFA U-17 Women's World Cup.

== Qualification ==
=== First qualifying round ===
==== Group 1 ====
Team	Pld	W	D	L	GF	GA	GD	Pts
England	3	3	0	0	17	0	+17	9
Wales	3	1	1	1	3	4	−1	4
Belarus	3	1	0	2	1	9	−8	3
Macedonia (H)	3	0	1	2	1	9	−8	1

(H) Hosts

==== Group 2 ====
Team	Pld	W	D	L	GF	GA	GD	Pts
Switzerland (H)	3	3	0	0	32	1	+31	9
Italy	3	2	0	1	35	2	+33	6
Faroe Islands	3	1	0	2	7	14	−7	3
Georgia	3	0	0	3	0	57	−57	0

(H) Hosts

==== Group 3 ====
Team	Pld	W	D	L	GF	GA	GD	Pts
Norway	3	3	0	0	14	1	+13	9
Hungary (H)	3	2	0	1	7	7	0	6
Croatia	3	1	0	2	4	7	−3	3
Greece	3	0	0	3	0	10	−10	0

(H) Hosts

==== Group 4 ====
Team	Pld	W	D	L	GF	GA	GD	Pts
Republic of Ireland	3	3	0	0	9	0	+9	9
Denmark	3	2	0	1	5	1	+4	6
Turkey	3	1	0	2	1	6	−5	3
Slovenia (H)	3	0	0	3	0	8	−8	0

(H) Hosts

==== Group 5 ====
Team	Pld	W	D	L	GF	GA	GD	Pts
Belgium	3	2	1	0	11	3	+8	7
Poland (H)	3	2	1	0	6	1	+5	7
Romania	3	1	0	2	2	6	−4	3
Bulgaria	3	0	0	3	1	10	−9	0

(H) Hosts
22 September 2009
10:00

Belgium	3–1	Romania
	Report

22 September 2009
13:00

Poland	2–0	Bulgaria
	Report

24 September 2009
10:00

Bulgaria	1–7	Belgium
	Report

24 September 2009
13:00

Poland	3–0	Romania
	Report

27 September 2009
11:00

Belgium	1–1	Poland
	Report

27 September 2009
12:00

Romania	1–0	Bulgaria
	Report

==== Group 6 ====
Team	Pld	W	D	L	GF	GA	GD	Pts
Netherlands	3	3	0	0	13	1	+12	9
Ukraine	3	2	0	1	12	3	+9	6
Kazakhstan	3	1	0	2	3	9	−6	3
Moldova (H)	3	0	0	3	1	16	−15	0

(H) Hosts

==== Group 7 ====
Team	Pld	W	D	L	GF	GA	GD	Pts
Germany	3	2	1	0	11	0	+11	7
France	3	2	0	1	10	2	+8	6
Iceland (H)	3	1	1	1	8	2	+6	4
Israel	3	0	0	3	0	25	−25	0

(H) Hosts

==== Group 8 ====
Team	Pld	W	D	L	GF	GA	GD	Pts
Sweden (H)	3	3	0	0	26	1	+25	9
Finland	3	2	0	1	13	4	+9	6
Latvia	3	1	0	2	3	13	−10	3
Estonia	3	0	0	3	0	24	−24	0

(H) Hosts

==== Group 9 ====
Team	Pld	W	D	L	GF	GA	GD	Pts
Austria	3	3	0	0	21	3	+18	9
Czech Republic	3	2	0	1	24	5	+19	6
Scotland	3	1	0	2	14	8	+6	3
Lithuania (H)	3	0	0	3	1	44	−43	0

(H) Hosts

==== Group 10 ====
Team	Pld	W	D	L	GF	GA	GD	Pts
Spain	3	2	1	0	26	2	+24	7
Serbia (H)	3	2	1	0	16	3	+13	7
Russia	3	1	0	2	20	5	+15	3
Armenia	3	0	0	3	0	52	−52	0

(H) Hosts

==== Ranking of second-placed teams ====
To determine the best six runner-up teams from the first qualifying round, only the results against the first and the third teams in each group were taken into account.

Grp	Team	Pld	W	D	L	GF	GA	GD	Pts
5	Poland	2	1	1	0	4	1	+3	4
10	Serbia	2	1	1	0	4	3	+1	4
2	Italy	2	1	0	1	8	2	+6	3
6	Ukraine	2	1	0	1	7	3	+4	3
8	Finland	2	1	0	1	6	4	+2	3
4	Denmark	2	1	0	1	3	1	+2	3
9	Czech Republic	2	1	0	1	6	5	+1	3
7	France	2	1	0	1	2	2	0	3
1	Wales	2	1	0	1	2	3	−1	3
3	Hungary	2	1	0	1	4	7	−3	3

=== Second qualifying round ===
The host nations of the four one-venue mini-tournament groups are indicated in italics.

==== Group 1 ====
Team	Pld	W	D	L	GF	GA	GD	Pts
Netherlands	3	3	0	0	5	1	+4	9
Italy (H)	3	1	1	1	6	3	+3	4
England	3	1	1	1	4	3	+1	4
Serbia	3	0	0	3	2	10	−8	0

(H) Hosts
8 April 2010
15:00

England	3–1	Serbia
Wilkinson 5', 40+2'; Ayisi 80+6'	Report	Papov 61'

Ellera, Italy
Referee: Marte Soro (NOR)
8 April 2010
15:00

Netherlands	2–0	Italy
Zeeman 4'; Renfurm 8'	Report

Ponte San Giovanni, Italy
Referee: Lina Lehtovaara (FIN)

10 April 2010
15:00

England	0–0	Italy
	Report

Santa Maria degli Angeli, Italy
Referee: Marcia Monteiro Pejapes (POR)
10 April 2010
15:00

Serbia	0–1	Netherlands
	Report	Bakker 22'

Umbertide, Italy
Referee: Marte Soro (NOR)

13 April 2010
15:00

Netherlands	2–1	England
Zeeman 58' (pen.); Schoenmakers 76'	Report	Wilkinson 56'

Deruta, Italy
Referee: Marcia Monteiro Pejapes (POR)
13 April 2010
15:00

Italy	6–1	Serbia
Pugnali 13'; Alborghetti 15' (pen.), 17'; Mason 24'; Moscia 53'; Piai 80+2'	Report	Savanović 69'

Bastia Umbra
Referee: Lina Lehtovaara (FIN)

==== Group 2 ====
Team	Pld	W	D	L	GF	GA	GD	Pts
Spain (H)	3	2	1	0	7	1	+6	7
Denmark	3	2	0	1	4	5	−1	6
Switzerland	3	0	2	1	0	2	−2	2
Belgium	3	0	1	2	0	3	−3	1

(H) Hosts
10 April 2010
11:00

Switzerland	0–0	Belgium
	Report

Pabellón de la Ciudad del Fútbol, Madrid, Spain
Referee: Nelli Stepanyan (Armenia)
10 April 2010
13:00

Spain	5–1	Denmark
Pinel 2', 51'; Mérida 23', 63'; Putellas 40+5'	Report	Iversen 57'

Pabellón de la Ciudad del Fútbol, Madrid, Spain
Referee: Vesna Mladin (CRO)

12 April 2010
17:30

Switzerland	0–2	Denmark
	Report	Jensen 28'; Neilsen 31'

Pabellón de la Ciudad del Fútbol, Madrid, Spain
Referee: Riem Hussein (GER)
12 April 2010
19:30

Belgium	0–2	Spain
	Report	Tazo 80+1'; García 80+3'

Pabellón de la Ciudad del Fútbol, Madrid, Spain
Referee: Nelli Stepanyan (Armenia)

15 April 2010
12:00

Spain	0–0	Switzerland
	Report

Pabellón de la Ciudad del Fútbol, Madrid, Spain
Referee: Vesna Mladin (CRO)
15 April 2010
12:00

Denmark	1–0	Belgium
Neilsen 66'	Report

Pabellón de la Ciudad del Fútbol, Madrid, Spain
Referee: Riem Hussein (GER)

==== Group 3 ====
Team	Pld	W	D	L	GF	GA	GD	Pts
Republic of Ireland	3	2	1	0	6	3	+3	7
Sweden	3	2	0	1	11	3	+8	6
Poland	3	0	2	1	4	7	−3	2
Ukraine (H)	3	0	1	2	3	11	−8	1

(H) Hosts
10 April 2010
12:00

Republic of Ireland	3–1	Ukraine
Gorman 14'; Donnelly 61'; O'Sullivan 74'	Report	Vorontsova 38'

Fiolent Stadium, Simferopol, Ukraine
Referee: Giovanna Farinelli (ITA)
10 April 2010
15:00

Sweden	4–1	Poland
J. Andersson 21', 35'; Rubensson 29'; Stegius 80+2'	Report	Krolikowska 47'

Sport KT Arena, Simferopol, Ukraine
Referee: Danijela Markovic (SRB)

13 April 2010
12:00

Sweden	6–0	Ukraine
P. Andersson 14'; Rolfö 23', 26'; J. Andersson 48'; Rubensson 65' (pen.); Holmgrem 77'	Report

Fiolent Stadium, Simferopol, Ukraine
Referee: Severine Zinck (FRA)
13 April 2010
15:00

Poland	1–1	Republic of Ireland
Cichosz 24'	Report	McLaughlin 11' (pen.)

Sport KT Arena, Simferopol, Ukraine
Referee: Danijela Markovic (SRB)

15 April 2010
15:00

Republic of Ireland	2–1	Sweden
Jarrett 58' (pen.); Campbell 66'	Report	Ericsson 2'

Sport KT Arena, Simferopol, Ukraine
Referee: Giovanna Farinelli (ITA)
15 April 2010
15:00

Ukraine	2–2	Poland
Tyelna 10', 47'	Report	Cichosz 45'; Gusciora 40'

Fiolent Stadium, Simferopol, Ukraine
Referee: Severine Zinck (FRA)

==== Group 4 ====
Team	Pld	W	D	L	GF	GA	GD	Pts
Germany	3	3	0	0	8	0	+8	9
Norway	3	2	0	1	3	5	−2	6
Austria (H)	3	1	0	2	1	2	−1	3
Finland	3	0	0	3	1	6	−5	0

(H) Hosts
10 April 2010
11:00

Norway	2–1	Finland
Birkeland 31'; Halvorsen 40+1'	Report	Liljedahl 12'

Sportzentrum, Trumau, Austria
Referee: Mayte Porro Araico (ESP)
10 April 2010
17:00

Austria	0–1	Germany
	Report	Petermann 26'

Sportzentrum, Trumau, Austria
Referee: Anastasia Pustovoitova (RUS)

12 April 2010
11:00

Germany	4–0	Norway
Chojnowski 10'; Thorisdottir 32' (o.g.); Petermann 34', 56'	Report

Sportzentrum, Trumau, Austria
Referee: Helen Fulcher-Ward (ENG)
12 April 2010
19:00

Austria	1–0	Finland
Zadrazil 47'	Report

Lindabrunn, Lindabrunn, Austria
Referee: Mayte Porro Araico (ESP)

15 April 2010
16:00

Austria	0–1	Norway
	Report	Hegerberg 76'

Wienerwaldstadion, Neulengbach, Austria
Referee: Helen Fulcher-Ward (ENG)
15 April 2010
11:00

Finland	0–3	Germany
	Report	Moik 15'; Petermann 33'; Romert 58'

Sportzentrum, Trumau, Austria
Referee: Anastasia Pustovoitova (RUS)

== Final tournament ==
2010 UEFA Women's Under-17 Championship teams and final tournament performance

The winners of the two semifinal matches qualified directly to the 2010 FIFA U-17 Women's World Cup held in Trinidad and Tobago. The losers of the semifinal matches contested in a third-place match to determine who receives the last qualifying spot for the 2010 World Cup.

== Squads ==
Each national team had to submit a squad of 18 players, two of whom had to be goalkeepers.

== Knockout stage ==
Semi-finals
22 June –
Netherlands	0
Spain	3
22 June –
Republic of Ireland	1
Germany	0

Final
26 June –
Spain	0 (4)
Republic of Ireland	0 (1)
Third place
26 June –
Netherlands	0
Germany	3

=== Semifinals ===
22 June 2010
14:30

Netherlands	0–3	Spain
	Report	Sampedro 32'; Pinel 52'; Lázaro 80+3'

Colovray, Nyon, Switzerland
Referee: Morag Pirie (SCO)

22 June 2010
19:00

Republic of Ireland	1–0	Germany
Campbell 38'	Report

Colovray, Nyon, Switzerland
Referee: Anastasia Pustovoitova (RUS)

=== Third place match ===
26 June 2010
16:30

Netherlands	0–3	Germany
	Report	Petermann 23'; Leupolz 56'; Chojnowski 70'

Colovray, Nyon, Switzerland
Referee: Morag Pirie (SCO)

=== Final ===
26 June 2010
13:30

Spain	0 – 0 (a.e.t)	Republic of Ireland
	Report
Penalties
Mérida (penalty scored); Gutiérrez (penalty scored); Sampedro (penalty scored); Catalá (penalty scored)	4–1	Jarrett (penalty missed); Gleeson (penalty missed); O'Brien (penalty scored)

Colovray, Nyon, Switzerland
Referee: Anastasia Pustovoitova (RUS)

2010 UEFA Women's Under-17 European champions

Spain
First title
