= Ana María Catalá =

Spanish footballer (born 1993)

Personal information
- Full name: Ana María Catalá Fernández
- Date of birth: 20 July 1993 (age 33)
- Place of birth: Madrid, Spain
- Height: 1.65 m (5 ft 5 in)
- Position: Defender

Team information
- Current team: Rayo Vallecano

Senior career*
Years	Team	Apps	(Gls)
2008–2016	Rayo Vallecano	87	(4)
2016–2020	Madrid CFF	61	(0)
2020–	Rayo Vallecano	10	(0)

International career
2009–2010	Spain U17		
- * Club domestic league appearances and goals as of 10:34, 17 August 2021 (UTC)

Ana María Catalá Fernández (born 20 July 1993), also known as Anama, is a Spanish footballer who plays as a defender for Rayo Vallecano.

== Personal life ==
Catalá initially played football from the age of six during school breaks and has experienced sexism as a female footballer. Outside of her football career, she studies at the School of Physical Activity and Sport Sciences (INEF).

== Playing career ==
Catalá scored the decisive penalty for Spain in the shootout of the 2010 U-17 European Championship final against Ireland.

In June 2020, Madrid CFF announced the departures of 12 players, including Catalá. In October 2020, it was announced that she would join Rayo Vallecano, the club that she had previously left to join Madrid CFF in the summer of 2016.
