= Dimitra Ivanova =

Bulgarian footballer

Dimitra Ivanova Димитра Иванова (Bulgarian)
Personal information
- Full name: Dimitra Zhechkova Ivanova
- Date of birth: 26 January 2004 (age 22)
- Position: Forward

Team information
- Current team: NSA Sofia
- Number: 14

Senior career*
| Years | Team | Apps | (Gls) |
- NSA Sofia

International career^{‡}
| 2019 | Bulgaria U17 | 6 | (2) |
| 2021– | Bulgaria | 1 | (0) |
- * Club domestic league appearances and goals ‡ National team caps and goals as of 11 June 2021.

Dimitra Zhechkova Ivanova (Bulgarian: Димитра Жечкова Иванова; born 26 January 2004) is a Bulgarian footballer who plays as a forward for Women's League club FC NSA Sofia and the Bulgaria women's national team.

== Club career ==
Ivanova has played for NSA Sofia in Bulgaria.

== International career ==
Ivanova represented Bulgaria at the 2019 UEFA Women's Under-17 Championship and the 2020 UEFA Women's Under-17 Championship qualification. She made her senior debut on 11 June 2021 as a 34th-minute substitution in a 0–1 friendly home loss to Bosnia and Herzegovina.
