= Aoife Horgan =

Republic of Ireland footballer

Personal information
- Full name: Aoife Horgan
- Date of birth: 17 January 2003 (age 23)
- Place of birth: Ireland
- Height: 5 ft 1 in (1.55 m)
- Position: Forward

Team information
- Current team: SD Raiders
- Number: 9

Youth career
- Listowel Celtic

College career
Years	Team	Apps	(Gls)
2021–2024	CCSU Blue Devils	52	(17)

Senior career*
Years	Team	Apps	(Gls)
2019	Limerick	10	(8)
2020–2021	Treaty United	21	(7)
2025	Holroyd Rangers		
2026–	SD Raiders	23	(15)

International career
2018−2019	Republic of Ireland U17	6	(2)
2021−2022	Republic of Ireland U19	3	(0)
- * Club domestic league appearances and goals as of 23 August 2026

Aoife Horgan (born 17 January 2003) is an Irish footballer who plays in Australia for SD Raiders.

== Club career ==
=== Early career ===
Horgan is from Listowel in County Kerry. She played for Listowel Celtic under-12s when she was six years old, alongside her older sister Rebecca.

=== Women's National League ===
Horgan joined Limerick WFC in 2019. On her début against Galway WFC, they lost 6–3 but Horgan got on the scoresheet. Three months later against DLR Waves, Horgan was on the scoresheet again, not once but twice as she scored two in the last ten minutes to complete a comeback from 2–0 down to win 3–2. When Limerick were dissolved she joined new club Treaty United WFC, who were based at the same site. She made her debut for them in a 5–0 loss to Peamount United. In her next game against DLR Waves, she scored her team's second goal in a 2–0 win.

By the end of the 2020 Women's National League season, Horgan was recognised as a promising striker and one of Treaty United's best players. She was praised by club captain Marie Curtin: "She's so good. She scores goals and that is the hardest thing to do in football. She is dynamic on the turn and is such a naturally gifted footballer so it's huge for us to have someone of her capacity in the squad."

=== College ===
Horgan accepted an offer to play four years of college soccer for the Central Connecticut State University "Blue Devils". At the 2021 Northeast Conference Women's Soccer Awards she was named to the Rookie Team of the Season.

=== Australia ===
Horgan moved to Australia after her time in America she signed with Holroyd Rangers in 2025 and then joined Southern Districts Raiders in February 2026.

== International career ==
=== Youth ===
Horgan represented Ireland at schoolgirl level in 2017–18 while she attended St. Joseph's Secondary School, Ballybunion. Horgan was first called up for a 2019 UEFA Women's Under-17 Championship qualification game against Albania in October 2018, but was an unused substitute in a 14–0 win. In her next call up, against the same opposition she came on in the 57th minute, and three minutes later she scored. She played well throughout the game and it finished 10–0.

With the Republic of Ireland women's national under-19 football team Horgan took part in the 2022 UEFA Women's Under-19 Championship qualification section in October 2021.
