= Yana Yordanova =

Bulgarian footballer

Yana Yordanova Яна Йорданова (Bulgarian)
Personal information
- Full name: Yana Krasimirova Yordanova
- Date of birth: 20 February 2003 (age 23)
- Place of birth: Kyustendil, Bulgaria
- Position: Midfielder

Team information
- Current team: Middle Tennessee State University
- Number: 4

College career
| Years | Team | Apps | (Gls) |
| 2022– | Middle Tennessee State University | 21 | (0) |

Senior career*
| Years | Team | Apps | (Gls) |
| 2019–2022 | NSA Sofia | | |

International career^{‡}
| 2019 | Bulgaria U17, Bulgaria National Team under 19, Bulgaria National Team A | 6 | (1) |
| 2021– | Bulgaria | 1 | (0) |
- * Club domestic league appearances and goals ‡ National team caps and goals as of 11 June 2021. Played in 2 games in 2024 and 1 in 2025

Yana Krasimirova Yordanova (Bulgarian: Яна Красимирова Йорданова; born 20 February 2003) is a Bulgarian footballer who plays as a midfielder for Middle Tennessee State University and the Bulgaria women's national team.

== Club career ==
Yordanova has played for NSA Sofia in Bulgaria.

Now she is playing for Middle Tennessee State University in D1 Level

== International career ==
Yordanova represented Bulgaria at the 2019 UEFA Women's Under-17 Championship and the 2020 UEFA Women's Under-17 Championship as a captain. qualification. She made her senior debut on 11 June 2021 in a 0–1 friendly home loss to Bosnia and Herzegovina.
