= Julia Magerl =

Austrian footballer (born 2003)

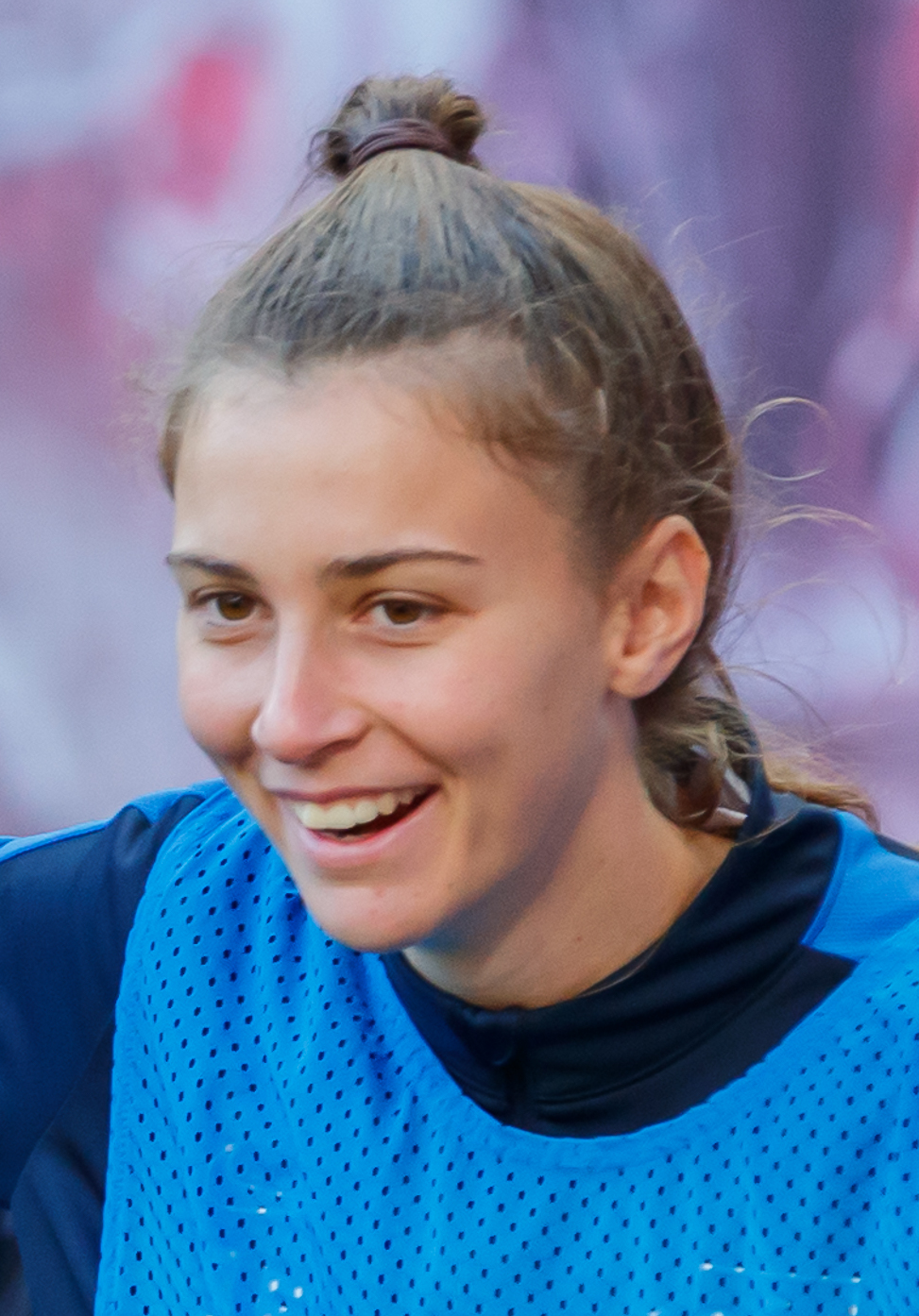
- Magerl with RB Leipzig in 2023

Personal information
- Date of birth: 2 May 2003 (age 23)
- Place of birth: Voitsberg, Austria
- Height: 1.72 m (5 ft 8 in)
- Position: Defender

Team information
- Current team: Werder Bremen
- Number: 4

Youth career
- 2008–2018: ASK Voitsberg

Senior career*
Years	Team	Apps	(Gls)
2018–2023	Sturm Graz	71	(6)
2023–2026	RB Leipzig	36	(0)
2026–	Werder Bremen	5	(1)

International career^{‡}
2018–2019	Austria U17	18	(6)
2021–2022	Austria U19	10	(2)
2022–	Austria	4	(1)
- * Club domestic league appearances and goals as of 23 September 2026 ‡ National team caps and goals as of 22 May 2025

Julia Magerl (born 2 May 2003) is an Austrian professional footballer who plays as a defender for Frauen-Bundesliga club SV Werder Bremen.

== Early life ==
Magerl is a native of Voitsberg, Austria.

== Club career ==
Magerl started her career with Austrian side Sturm Graz, where she was regarded as one of the club's most important players. She made 71 appearances in the ÖFB Frauen Bundesliga, scoring six goals.

Magere moved to Bundesliga club SV Werder Bremen in July 2026.

== International career ==
In 2022, Magerl debuted for the Austria national team against Romania, scoring on her debut.

== Personal life ==
Magerl has an older brother.

== Career statistics ==
=== International ===
As of match played 29 October 2024

Appearances and goals by national team and year
National team	Year	Apps	Goals
Austria
Austria	2022	3	0
Austria	2023	0	0
Austria	2024	1	0
Total		4	0
