= Katarzyna Konat =

Polish footballer (born 1996)

Personal information
- Date of birth: 17 January 1996 (age 30)
- Height: 1.74 m (5 ft 9 in)
- Position: Defender

Team information
- Current team: AP Orlen Gdańsk
- Number: 10

Senior career*
Years	Team	Apps	(Gls)
2012–2015	Medyk Konin		
2015–2016	AZS PWSZ Wałbrzych		
2016–2019	Medyk Konin		
2019–2023	UKS SMS Łódź	61	(9)
2022	→ Pomigliano (loan)	9	(1)
2023–2024	Sporting de Huelva	15	(1)
2024–2025	Braga		
2025–	AP Orlen Gdańsk	16	(1)

International career^{‡}
- Poland U17
2013–	Poland	13	(0)
Medal record
Representing Poland
Women's football
UEFA Women's Under-17 Championship
Winner	2013 Switzerland
- * Club domestic league appearances and goals as of 22:02, 2 June 2026 (UTC) ‡ National team caps and goals as of 22 November 2024

Katarzyna Konat (born 17 January 1996) is a Polish professional footballer who plays as a defender for Ekstraliga club AP Orlen Gdańsk.

== International career ==
Konat won the 2013 UEFA Women's Under-17 Championship with the Poland U17 national team.

== Career statistics ==
=== International ===
As of match played 6 October 2022

Appearances and goals by national team and year
National team	Year	Apps	Goals
Poland	2013	2	0
Poland	2014	2	0
Poland	2015	5	0
Poland	2019	1	0
Poland	2022	3	0
Total		13	0

== Honours ==
Medyk Konin

- Ekstraliga: 2013–14, 2014–15, 2016–17
- Polish Cup: 2012–13, 2016–17, 2018–19

UKS SMS Łódź

- Ekstraliga: 2021–22
- Polish Cup: 2022–23

Poland U17

- UEFA Women's Under-17 Championship: 2013
