= Maria Edwards (footballer) =

English footballer (born 2003)

Personal information
- Date of birth: 12 May 2003 (age 23)
- Place of birth: Manchester, England
- Height: 1.63 m (5 ft 4 in)
- Position: Forward

Team information
- Current team: Southampton
- Number: 12

Youth career
- 2013–2015: Manchester City
- 2015–2017: Manchester United
- 2017–2019: Manchester City
- 2019–2022: Manchester United

Senior career*
| Years | Team | Apps | (Gls) |
| 2019–2022 | Manchester United | 0 | (0) |
| 2020–2021 | → Blackburn Rovers (loan) | 14 | (2) |
| 2022–2024 | SGS Essen | 20 | (1) |
| 2024–2025 | Blackburn Rovers | 19 | (3) |
| 2025- | Southampton | 9 | (0) |

International career^{‡}
| 2017 | England U15 | 3 | (4) |
| 2018 | England U16 | 6 | (5) |
| 2019 | England U17 | 3 | (2) |
- * Club domestic league appearances and goals as of 6 August 2024 ‡ National team caps and goals as of 27 September 2019

Maria Edwards (born 12 May 2003) is an English footballer who plays as a striker for Women's Super League 2 club Southampton.

She previously came through the youth ranks at both Manchester City and Manchester United, and played professionally in the German Bundesliga with SGS Essen. She has represented her nation at under-15, under-16 and under-17 level.

== Club career ==
=== Youth career ===
Maria Edwards started her football career in the Manchester City academy. She was the leading goalscorer for her respective age bracket, scoring 70 goals in 24 games during the 2014–15 season. On 13 June 2015, Edwards was signed by Manchester United and joined the Regional Talent Club before returning to Manchester City in 2017. On 14 April 2018, Edwards scored a hat-trick for Manchester City U16s during a 3–1 victory over Reading in the final of the FA Youth Cup at St George’s Park.

=== Manchester United ===
==== 2019–20 season ====
In 2019, Edwards rejoined United following the creation of a senior team the season before. The club also entered a full-time U21 team to compete in the FA WSL Academy League for the first time. Ahead of the 2019–20 season, Edwards received the number 24 shirt and traveled to Norway with the senior team during preseason, making her unofficial senior debut in a friendly against Vålerenga. On 16 September 2019, Edwards was named as a substitute for the senior team for the first time during United's FA Women's Super League game against Arsenal. In her first season back with United, Edwards finished as the academy team's top scorer, scoring 23 goals in 18 appearances.

==== 2020–21 season: Loan to Blackburn Rovers ====
On 7 October 2020, Edwards joined Championship team Blackburn Rovers on loan for the season. She made her senior debut the same day as a 56th-minute substitute in a 1–0 League Cup group stage loss to WSL side Birmingham City. She scored her first goal for the club on 13 December 2020, scoring in the opening 30 seconds of a 3–3 Championship draw with Sheffield United.

=== SGS Essen ===
On 6 August 2022, Edwards signed for German Bundesliga club SGS Essen. On 11 December 2022, she scored her first and only goal for SGS Essen against MSV Duisburg in a 6–0 victory. Her contract was mutually terminated on 5 January 2024.

=== Blackburn Rovers ===
On 6 August 2024, Edwards returned to Blackburn Rovers, signing a permanent deal with the Championship team.

=== Southampton FC ===
On 16 July 2025, she signed for Women's Super League 2 club Southampton.

== International career ==
In October 2019, Edwards was called up to England U17 squad for the 2020 UEFA Women's Under-17 Championship qualifying round in Bosnia and Herzegovina. She made her U17 debut as a substitute in the opening game against Croatia. Edwards played in all three group games and scored two goals.

== Personal life ==
Edwards previously also competed in boxing having started aged 8 at the Collyhurst and Moston Boxing Club in Manchester and was coached by former boxer Thomas McDonagh. She is a two-time England Boxing National Schools Champion, winning in 2016 and 2017.

She has named her sporting heroes as Ronaldo and Marta in football, and Nicola Adams and Manny Pacquiao in boxing.

== Career statistics ==
=== Club ===
As of 6 August 2024.

Appearances and goals by club, season and competition
| Club | Season | League | | | National cup (Note: Includes the FA Cup and DFB-Pokal) | | League cup (Note: Includes the FA Women's League Cup) | | Total | |
| Club | Season | Division | Apps | Goals | Apps | Goals | Apps | Goals | Apps | Goals |
|---|---|---|---|---|---|---|---|---|---|---|
| Manchester United | 2019–20 | Women's Super League | 0 | 0 | 0 | 0 | 0 | 0 | 0 | 0 |
| Manchester United | 2020–21 | Women's Super League | 0 | 0 | 0 | 0 | 0 | 0 | 0 | 0 |
| Manchester United | 2021–22 | Women's Super League | 0 | 0 | 0 | 0 | 0 | 0 | 0 | 0 |
| Manchester United | Total | | 0 | 0 | 0 | 0 | 0 | 0 | 0 | 0 |
| Blackburn Rovers (loan) | 2020–21 | Championship | 14 | 2 | 0 | 0 | 2 | 0 | 16 | 2 |
| SGS Essen | 2022–23 | Bundesliga | 14 | 1 | 3 | 0 | — | | 17 | 1 |
| SGS Essen | 2023–24 | Bundesliga | 6 | 0 | 2 | 0 | — | | 8 | 0 |
| SGS Essen | Total | | 20 | 1 | 5 | 0 | 0 | 0 | 25 | 1 |
| Blackburn Rovers | 2024–25 | Championship | 0 | 0 | 0 | 0 | 0 | 0 | 0 | 0 |
| Career total | | | 34 | 3 | 5 | 0 | 2 | 0 | 41 | 3 |
