= Estonia women's national under-17 football team =

Estonia Women's U-17
- Association: EJL
- Confederation: UEFA (Europe)
- Head coach: Taavi Midenbritt
- FIFA code: EST

First international
- Estonia 8–5 Latvia; 27 August 2007

Biggest win
- Estonia 10–0 Moldova; 27 September 2021

Biggest defeat
- Estonia 0–14 Sweden; 17 September 2009

UEFA Women's Under-17 Championship
- Appearances: 1 (first in 2023)
- Best result: Group stage (2023)

Estonian women's national under-17 football team represents Estonia in international youth football competitions.

== FIFA U-17 Women's World Cup ==
The team has never qualified for the FIFA U-17 Women's World Cup.

Year	Result	Matches	Wins	Draws*	Losses	GF	GA
(New Zealand) 2008	did not qualify						
(Trinidad and Tobago) 2010	did not qualify						
(Azerbaijan) 2012	did not qualify						
(Costa Rica) 2014	did not qualify						
(Jordan) 2016	did not qualify						
(Uruguay) 2018	did not qualify						
(India) 2022	did not qualify						
(Dominican Republic) 2024	did not qualify						
(Morocco) 2025	did not qualify						
Total	0/9	0	0	0	0	0	0

== UEFA Women's Under-17 Championship ==
The team previously never qualified for the UEFA Women's Under-17 Championship when Estonia was awarded the hosting rights to the 2023 championship on 19 April 2021.

Year	Result	GP	W	D	L	GF	GA
(Switzerland) 2008	did not qualify						
(Switzerland) 2009	did not qualify						
(Switzerland) 2010	did not qualify						
(Switzerland) 2011	did not qualify						
(Switzerland) 2012	did not qualify						
(Switzerland) 2013	did not qualify						
(England) 2014	did not qualify						
(Iceland) 2015	did not qualify						
(Belarus) 2016	did not qualify						
(Czech Republic) 2017	did not qualify						
(Lithuania) 2018	did not qualify						
(Bulgaria) 2019	did not qualify						
(Sweden) ~~2020~~	cancelled						
(Faroe Islands) ~~2021~~	cancelled						
(Bosnia and Herzegovina) 2022	did not qualify						
(Estonia) 2023	Group stage	3	0	0	3	0	15
(Sweden) 2024	did not qualify						
(Faroe Islands) 2025	did not qualify						
(Northern Ireland) 2026	did not qualify						
(Finland) 2027	to be determined						
(Belgium) 2028	to be determined						
(Turkey) 2029	to be determined						
Total	1/16	3	0	0	3	0	15

== See also ==
- Estonia women's national football team
