= Adina Cristina Borodi =

Romanian footballer (born 2004)

Personal information
- Date of birth: 20 November 2004 (age 21)
- Place of birth: Baia Mare
- Position: Forward

Team information
- Current team: Olimpia Cluj

International career^{‡}
Years	Team	Apps	(Gls)
2019	Romania U17	4	(6)
2020–	Romania	1	(0)
- ‡ National team caps and goals as of 15:11, 31 January 2021 (UTC)

Adina Cristina Borodi (born 20 November 2004) is a Romanian footballer who plays as a forward for Olimpia Cluj and the Romania women's national team.

== Career ==
She made her debut for the Romania national team on 23 October 2020 against Lithuania, coming on as a substitute for Mara Bâtea.
