= Paula Perea =

Spanish footballer (born 1996)

Personal information
- Full name: Paula Perea Ramírez
- Date of birth: 19 June 1996 (age 30)
- Place of birth: Seville, Spain
- Height: 1.57 m (5 ft 2 in)
- Position: Defender

Team information
- Current team: Espanyol
- Number: 16

Senior career*
Years	Team	Apps	(Gls)
2011–2014	Sevilla	57+	(3+)
2014–2016	Sporting de Huelva	49	(0)
2016–	Real Betis	139	(3)
- * Club domestic league appearances and goals as of 21:08, 10 December 2021 (UTC)

Paula Perea Ramírez (born 19 June 1996) is a Spanish professional footballer who plays as a defender for Liga F club Espanyol.

== Club career ==
Perea started her career at Sevilla.
