= Ella Touon =

Swiss association football player

Personal information
- Full name: Ella Emilie Touon Mbenoun
- Date of birth: 7 August 2003 (age 23)
- Place of birth: Düsseldorf, Germany
- Height: 1.57 m (5 ft 2 in)
- Position: Midfielder

Team information
- Current team: Ajax

Senior career*
Years	Team	Apps	(Gls)
2020–2023	SGS Essen	34	(1)
2023–2025	SKN St. Pölten	35	(1)
2025–2026	1. FC Köln	1	(0)
2026	→ SGS Essen (loan)	9	(3)
2026–	Ajax	9	(0)

International career^{‡}
2019	Switzerland U17	3	(1)
2021	Switzerland U19	3	(0)
2021–	Switzerland	4	(0)
- * Club domestic league appearances and goals as of 21 November 2026 ‡ National team caps and goals as of 21 Jan 2024

Ella Emilie Touon Mbenoun (born 7 August 2003) is a Swiss footballer who plays as a midfielder for Eredivisie club Ajax. Born in Düsseldorf, Germany, she plays for the Switzerland national team.

== Club career ==
From 2020 to 2023, Touon played at SGS Essen in the Frauen-Bundesliga. She signed with SKN St. Pölten in the Austrian league before the 2023–24 season.

In May 2025, Touon returned to Germany, signing for 1. FC Köln. In February 2026, she was loaned to SGS Essen until the end of the season.

On 12 July 2026, it was announced that Touon had signed with Ajax.

== International career ==
Touon has represented Switzerland at youth level.
