= Alícia Correia =

Portuguese footballer (born 2003)

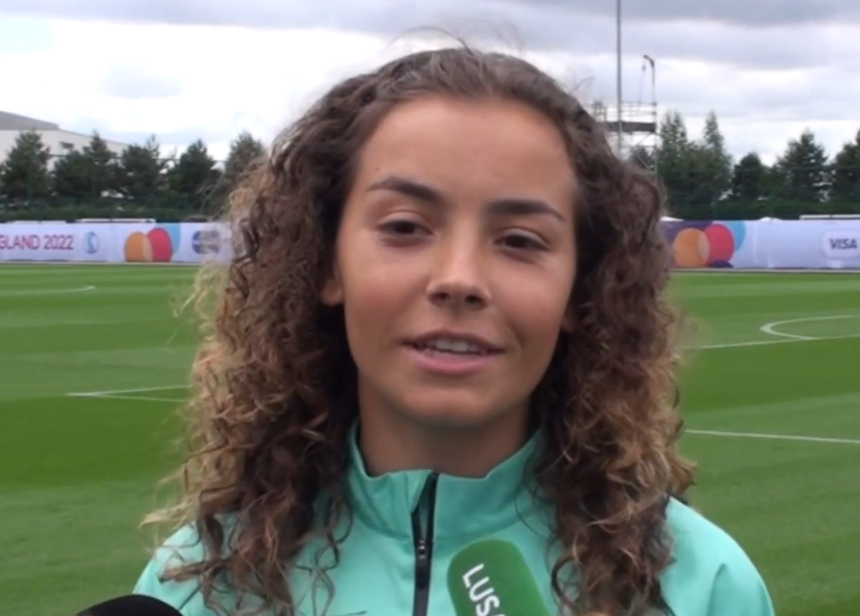
- Correia in 2022

Personal information
- Full name: Alícia de Figueiredo Lima Correia
- Date of birth: 29 April 2003 (age 23)
- Place of birth: Barreiro, Portugal
- Height: 1.59 m (5 ft 3 in)
- Position: Defender

Team information
- Current team: Sporting CP
- Number: 77

Youth career
- 2010–2016: Barreirense
- 2016–2020: Sporting CP

Senior career*
Years	Team	Apps	(Gls)
2020–	Sporting CP	73	(1)

International career^{‡}
2018	Portugal U16	6	(0)
2018–2020	Portugal U17	24	(2)
2023–	Portugal U23	8	(1)
2020–	Portugal	13	(0)
- * Club domestic league appearances and goals as of 20 June 2025 ‡ National team caps and goals as of 20 June 2025

Alícia Correia (born 29 April 2003) is a Portuguese professional footballer who plays as a defender for Sporting CP and the Portugal national team.

== Club career ==
Correia signed a professional contract with Sporting CP on 19 November 2020, at the age of 17.

== International career ==
Correia made her debut for the Portugal national team on 23 October 2020 against Cyprus.

== Honours ==
Sporting

- Taça de Portugal: 2021-22
- Supertaça de Portugal: 2021, 2024
