= Matilde Pavan =

Italian footballer (born 2004)

- Pavan in 2025

Personal information
- Date of birth: 12 June 2004 (age 22)
- Place of birth: Venice, Italy
- Height: 1.68 m (5 ft 6 in)
- Position: Midfielder

Team information
- Current team: Juventus
- Number: 19

Youth career
- 2016–2017: Venezia
- 2017–2019: Hellas Verona
- 2019–2021: Inter Milan

Senior career*
Years	Team	Apps	(Gls)
2018–2019	Hellas Verona	1	(0)
2019–2025	Inter Milan	19	(0)
2022–2023	→ FC Como (loan)	24	(3)
2025–	Juventus	2	(1)
2025–2026	→ FC Como (loan)	22	(2)

International career^{‡}
2021–	Italy U19	12	(1)
2023-	Italy U23	6	(2)
2023–	Italy	2	(0)
- * Club domestic league appearances and goals as of 25 October 2026 (UTC) ‡ National team caps and goals as of 1 December 2025

Matilde Pavan (born 12 June 2004) is an Italian professional footballer who plays as a Midfielder for Serie A club Juventus and the Italy women's national team.

== Club career ==
=== Juventus ===
On 10 July 2025, Pavan signed a three-year contract with Juventus valid until 30 June 2028. She scored her first UWCL goal against FK Austria Wien on 29 October 2026.

== International career ==
Pavan has represented Italy at youth and senior level.

== Honours ==
Juventus

- Serie A Women's Cup: 2026

Individual

- Serie A Team of the Season (Under-21): 2022–23
