= Luisa Pugnali =

Italian footballer (born 1994)

Personal information
- Date of birth: 20 March 1994 (age 32)
- Place of birth: Assisi, Italy
- Height: 1.68 m (5 ft 6 in)
- Position: Forward

Team information
- Current team: Sassuolo

International career
Years	Team	Apps	(Gls)
2015–2016	Italy	3	(0)

Luisa Pugnali (born 20 March 1994) is an Italian former professional footballer who played as a striker.
