= Manssita Traoré =

French footballer (born 2003)

Personal information
- Full name: Manssita Aissatou Traoré
- Date of birth: 9 September 2003 (age 23)
- Place of birth: Noisy-le-Grand, France
- Height: 1.63 m (5 ft 4 in)
- Position: Forward

Team information
- Current team: Strasbourg
- Number: 80

Youth career
- 2014–2018: SFC Neuilly-sur-Marne
- 2018–2019: Noisy-le-Grand FC
- 2019–2022: Paris Saint-Germain

Senior career*
Years	Team	Apps	(Gls)
2022–2025	Paris Saint-Germain	30	(2)
2025–	Strasbourg	14	(1)

International career^{‡}
2019	France U16	3	(0)
2019	France U17	3	(3)
2022	France U19	4	(2)
2021–2022	France U20	11	(0)
2022–	France U23	9	(0)
- * Club domestic league appearances and goals as of 11 September 2026 ‡ National team caps and goals as of 2 December 2024

Manssita Aissatou Traoré (born 9 September 2003) is a French professional footballer who plays as a forward for Première Ligue club Strasbourg.

== Club career ==
Traoré joined the youth academy of Paris Saint-Germain in 2019. On 1 June 2022, she made her professional debut for the club in a 1–0 league defeat against Reims. On 15 November 2022, she signed her first professional contract with the club until June 2025. She scored her first goal for the club on 2 April 2023 in a 1–0 league win against Bordeaux.

On 14 June 2025, Traoré joined Strasbourg on a one-year contract.

== International career ==
Traoré was part of French team at the 2022 FIFA U-20 Women's World Cup.

== Career statistics ==
As of match played 7 May 2025

Appearances and goals by club, season and competition
Club	Season	League			Cup		Continental		Other		Total	
Club	Season	Division	Apps	Goals	Apps	Goals	Apps	Goals	Apps	Goals	Apps	Goals
Paris Saint-Germain	2021–22	Première Ligue	1	0	0	0	0	0	—		1	0
Paris Saint-Germain	2022–23	Première Ligue	9	1	3	0	3 (Note: Appearances in UEFA Women's Champions League)	0	0	0	15	1
Paris Saint-Germain	2023–24	Première Ligue	9	0	3	0	2	0	0	0	14	0
Paris Saint-Germain	2024–25	Première Ligue	11	1	1	1	0	0	0	0	12	2
Paris Saint-Germain	Total		30	2	7	1	5	0	0	0	42	3
Strasbourg	2025–26	Première Ligue	0	0	0	0	—		—		0	0
Career total			30	2	7	1	5	0	0	0	42	3

== Honours ==
Paris Saint-Germain

- Coupe de France: 2023–24

Individual

- Titi d'Or: 2021
