= Inès Kbida =

French-Moroccan football player (born 2003)

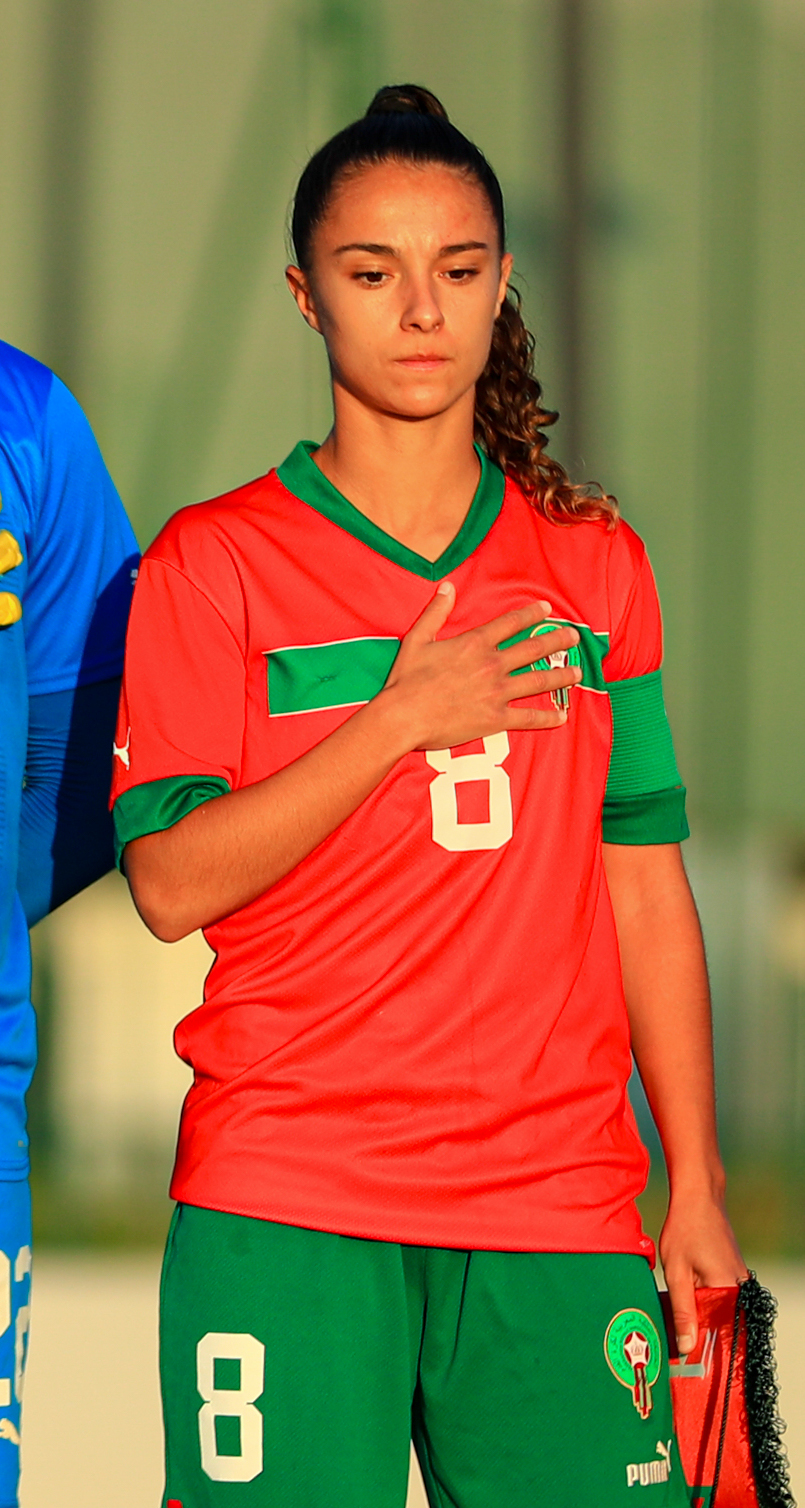

Personal information
- Full name: Inès Émilia Kbida
- Date of birth: 10 May 2003 (age 23)
- Place of birth: Colmar, France
- Position: Full back

Team information
- Current team: Marseille

International career
Years	Team	Apps	(Gls)
- Morocco

Inès Kbida (born on May 10, 2003), is a professional footballer who plays as a Full back for club Marseille. Born in France, she plays for Morocco internationally.

== International career ==
Inès Kbida represents Morocco at international level. Kiba has represented France at youth level.
