= Bulgaria women's national under-17 football team =

Bulgarian youth football team

Bulgaria Women's U-17
- Association: BFU
- Confederation: UEFA (Europe)
- Head coach: Trayan Radulov
- FIFA code: BUL

First international
- Poland 2–0 Bulgaria; 22 September 2009

Biggest win
- Bulgaria 4–0 Moldova; 28 October 2015

Biggest defeat
- Switzerland 11–0 Bulgaria; 19 October 2012; Bulgaria 0–11 Netherlands; 21 October 2016

Bulgaria women's national under-17 football team represents Bulgaria in international youth football competitions.

== FIFA U-17 Women's World Cup ==
The team has never qualified for the FIFA U-17 Women's World Cup

Year	Result	Matches	Wins	Draws*	Losses	GF	GA
(New Zealand) 2008	Did not qualify						
(Trinidad and Tobago) 2010	Did not qualify						
(Azerbaijan) 2012	Did not qualify						
(Costa Rica) 2014	Did not qualify						
(Jordan) 2016	Did not qualify						
(Uruguay) 2018	Did not qualify						
(India) 2022	Did not qualify						
(Dominican Republic) 2024	Did not qualify						
(Morocco) 2025	Did not qualify						
Total	0/8	0	0	0	0	0	0

== UEFA Women's Under-17 Championship ==
The team has only qualified for the 2019 UEFA Women's Under-17 Championship as the hosts of the tournament.

Year	Result	GP	W	D	L	GF	GA
(Switzerland) 2008	Did not qualify						
(Switzerland) 2009	Did not qualify						
(Switzerland) 2010	Did not qualify						
(Switzerland) 2011	Did not qualify						
(Switzerland) 2012	Did not qualify						
(Switzerland) 2013	Did not qualify						
(England) 2014	Did not qualify						
(Iceland) 2015	Did not qualify						
(Belarus) 2016	Did not qualify						
(Czech Republic) 2017	Did not qualify						
(Lithuania) 2018	Did not qualify						
(Bulgaria) 2019	Group Stage	3	0	0	3	1	8
(Sweden) ~~2020~~	Cancelled						
(Faroe Islands) ~~2021~~	Cancelled						
(Bosnia and Herzegovina) 2022	Did not qualify						
(Estonia) 2023	Did not qualify						
(Sweden) 2024	Did not qualify						
(Faroe Islands) 2025	Did not qualify						
(Northern Ireland) 2026	Did not qualify						
(Finland) 2027	to be determined						
(Belgium) 2028	to be determined						
(Turkey) 2029	to be determined						
Total	1/16	3	0	0	3	1	8

== See also ==
- Bulgaria women's national football team
