= Austria women's national under-17 football team =

National youth association football team

Austria Women's U-17
- Association: Österreichischer Fußball-Bund (ÖFB)
- Confederation: UEFA (Europe)
- Head coach: Patrick Haidbauer
- FIFA code: AUT
First colours	Second colours

First international
- Czech Republic 1–5 Austria; 7 September 2009

Biggest win
- Austria 13–0 Georgia; 25 September 2017

Biggest defeat
- Austria 0–4 Germany; 5 June 2013; Austria 0–4 Germany; 1 September 2016; Spain 4–0 Austria; 14 May 2022

UEFA Women's Under-17 Championship
- Appearances: 3 (first in 2014)
- Best result: Group stage (2014, 2019, 2025)

Austria women's national under-17 football team is the football team representing Austria in competitions for under-17 year old players and is controlled by the Austrian Football Association. The team managed to qualify three times for the UEFA Women's Under-17 Championship in 2014, 2019 and 2025.

== Competitive record ==
=== FIFA U-17 Women's World Cup ===
FIFA U-17 Women's World Cup record
Year	Result	Position	Pld	W	D*	L	GF	GA
(New Zealand) 2008	Did not enter							
(Trinidad and Tobago) 2010	Did not qualify							
(Azerbaijan) 2012	Did not qualify							
(Costa Rica) 2014	Did not qualify							
(Jordan) 2016	Did not qualify							
(Uruguay) 2018	Did not qualify							
(India) 2022	Did not qualify							
(Dominican Republic) 2024	Did not qualify							
(Morocco) 2025	Did not qualify							
(Morocco) 2026	Did not qualify							
(Morocco) 2027	To be determined							
(Morocco) 2028	To be determined							
(Morocco) 2029	To be determined							
Total	—	0/9	—	—	—	—	—	—

*Draws include knockout matches decided on penalty kicks.

=== UEFA Women's Under-17 Championship ===
The team qualified for the first time in 2014.

UEFA Women's Under-17 Championship record
Year	Result	Position	Pld	W	D*	L	GF	GA
(Switzerland) 2008	Did not enter							
(Switzerland) 2009	Did not qualify							
(Switzerland) 2010	Did not qualify							
(Switzerland) 2011	Did not qualify							
(Switzerland) 2012	Did not qualify							
(Switzerland) 2013	Did not qualify							
(England) 2014	Group stage	5th	3	1	1	1	2	2
(Iceland) 2015	Did not qualify							
(Belarus) 2016	Did not qualify							
(Czech Republic) 2017	Did not qualify							
(Lithuania) 2018	Did not qualify							
(Bulgaria) 2019	Group stage	7th	3	0	0	3	3	9
(Sweden) 2020	Cancelled							
(Faroe Islands) 2021	Cancelled							
(Bosnia and Herzegovina) 2022	Did not qualify							
(Estonia) 2023	Did not qualify							
(Sweden) 2024	Did not qualify							
(Faroe Islands) 2025	Group stage	6th	3	1	1	1	10	4
(Northern Ireland) 2026	Did not qualify							
(Finland) 2027	To be determined							
(Belgium) 2028	To be determined							
(Turkey) 2029	To be determined							
Total	Group stage	3/16	9	2	2	5	15	15

*Draws include knockout matches decided on penalty kicks.

== Results and fixtures ==
- The following is a list of match results in the last 12 months, as well as any future matches that have been scheduled.

Legend

Win Draw Lose Fixture

== See also ==
- Austria women's national football team
- Women's association football around the world
- Austria men's national football team
