= Republic of Ireland women's national under-17 football team =

National U-17 association football team

Republic of Ireland Women's under-17
- Nickname: The Girls in Green
- Association: Women's Football Association of Ireland (Europe)
- Confederation: UEFA
- Head coach: James Scott
- FIFA code: IRL
First colours	Second colours

Biggest win
- (Republic of Ireland) Rep. of Ireland 16–0 vs Azerbaijan (28 September 2026)

FIFA U-17 Women's World Cup
- Appearances: 1 (first in 2010)
- Best result: Quarterfinals (2010)

UEFA Women's Under-17 Championship
- Appearances: 3 (first in 2010)
- Best result: Runners-up (2010)

The Republic of Ireland women's national under-17 football team represents the Republic of Ireland in international youth football competitions.

== FIFA U-17 Women's World Cup ==
Year	Result	Pld	W	D	L	GF	GA	Squad
(New Zealand) 2008	Did not qualify							
(Trinidad and Tobago) 2010	Quarter-finals	4	2	0	2	6	4	Squad
(Azerbaijan) 2012	Did not qualify							
(Costa Rica) 2014	Did not qualify							
(Jordan) 2016	Did not qualify							
(Uruguay) 2018	Did not qualify							
(India) 2022	Did not qualify							
(Dominican Republic) 2024	Did not qualify							
(Morocco) 2025	Did not qualify							
(Morocco) 2026	Did not qualify							
(Morocco) 2027	To be determined							
(Morocco) 2028	To be determined							
(Morocco) 2029	To be determined							
Total	1/13	4	2	0	2	6	4	–

== UEFA Women's Under-17 Championship ==
Year	Round	Pld	W	D	L	GF	GA	Squad
(Switzerland) 2008	did not qualify							
(Switzerland) 2009	did not qualify							
(Switzerland) 2010	Runners-up	2	1	1	0	1	0	Squad
(Switzerland) 2011	did not qualify							
(Switzerland) 2012	did not qualify							
(Switzerland) 2013	did not qualify							
(England) 2014	did not qualify							
(Iceland) 2015	Group Stage	3	0	0	3	0	4	Squad
(Belarus) 2016	did not qualify							
(Czech Republic) 2017	Group Stage	3	0	1	2	0	6	Squad
(Lithuania) 2018	did not qualify							
(Bulgaria) 2019	did not qualify							
(Sweden) ~~2020~~	Cancelled due to Covid 19							
(Faroe Islands) ~~2021~~	Cancelled due to Covid 19							
(Bosnia and Herzegovina) 2022	did not qualify							
(Estonia) 2023	did not qualify							
(Sweden) 2024	did not qualify							
(Faroe Islands) 2025	did not qualify							
(Northern Ireland) 2026	did not qualify							
(Finland) 2027	to be determined							
(Belgium) 2028	to be determined							
(Turkey) 2029	to be determined							
Total	3/16	8	1	2	5	1	10	

== Results and fixtures ==
The following is a list of match results in the last 12 months, as well as any future matches that have been scheduled.

Legend

Win Draw Lose Fixture

=== 2025 ===
23 October 2026 UEFA European Under-17 Championship qualification	France	2–0	Republic of Ireland	Frankfurt, Germany
16:00 GMT (16:00 local time)	Ane 19'; L. Motyka 90+2'	Report		Stadium: DFB-Campus; Attendance: 50; Referee: Marta San Juan (Andorra)

26 October 2026 UEFA European Under-17 Championship qualification	Belgium	0–4	Republic of Ireland	Frankfurt, Germany
15:30 GMT (16:30 local time)		Report	Milton 21', 52', 58'; Comiskey 83'	Stadium: DFB-Campus; Attendance: 80; Referee: Hanna Laajanen (Sweden)

29 October 2026 UEFA European Under-17 Championship qualification	Republic of Ireland	0–2	Germany	Frankfurt, Germany
12:00 GMT (13:00 local time)		Report	Säring 13'; Choisy 65'	Stadium: DFB-Campus; Attendance: 180; Referee: Marta San Juan (Andorra)

=== 2026 ===
27 February 2026 UEFA European Under-17 Championship qualification	Republic of Ireland	0–2	Germany	Stockholm, Sweden
12:00 GMT (13:00 local time)		Report	Choisy 43'; Kleemann 81'	Stadium: Kristinebergs IP; Attendance: 87; Referee: Ugne Šmitaite (Lithuania)

2 March 2026 UEFA European Under-17 Championship qualification	Denmark	1–0	Republic of Ireland	Stockholm, Sweden
12:00 GMT (13:00 local time)	Bischoff 42'	Report		Stadium: Kristinebergs IP; Attendance: 70; Referee: Elisabet Calvo Valentín (Spain)

5 March 2026 UEFA European Under-17 Championship qualification	Sweden	3–0	Republic of Ireland	Stockholm, Sweden
17:00 GMT (18:00 local time)	Krasniqi 45'; Häggkvist 48'; Peterson 56'	Report		Stadium: Kristinebergs IP; Attendance: 202; Referee: Audrey Gerbel (France)

28 September 2027 UEFA Under-17 Championship qualification	Republic of Ireland	16–0	Azerbaijan	Rrogozhinë, Albania
11:00 GMT (12:00 local time)	Whelan 9', 33'; Goggin 12', 22'; Milton 16'; Twomey 18'; Healy 29', 85'; Hallinan 34'; Woods 43'; Mooney 49'; Ismayilova 53' (o.g.); Meehan 68', 90+1'; Duffy 74'; Kelly 79'	Report		Stadium: Egnatia Arena; Referee: Zoe Stavrou (Cyprus)

1 October 2027 UEFA Under-17 Championship qualification	Republic of Ireland	2–0	Albania	Durrës, Albania
14:00 GMT (15:00 local time)	Milton 8'; Harcourt 19'	Report		Stadium: Niko Dovana Stadium; Referee: Sara Telek (Austria)

4 October 2027 UEFA Under-17 Championship qualification	Kosovo	0–6	Republic of Ireland	Rrogozhinë, Albania
11:00 GMT (12:00 local time)		Report	Milton 1'; Dallaghan 3'; Twomey 10'; Goggin 28', 66'; Healy 32'	Stadium: Egnatia Arena; Referee: Sara Telek (Austria)

== Current Squad ==
The following players were called up for the 2027 UEFA Women's Under-17 Championship qualification Round 1 fixtures against Azerbaijan, Albania & Kosovo on 28 September and 1 & 4 October 2026.

Players born on or after 1 January 2010 are eligible for the European Qualifiers.

Caps and goals correct as of 4 October 2026, after the match against Kosovo.

No.	Pos.	Player	Date of birth (age)	Caps	Goals	Club
1	GK	Sarah Doyle	18 June 2010 (age 16)	8	0	(Football Association of Ireland) Shamrock Rovers
16	GK	Lucy Doyle Farrington	26 January 2010 (age 16)	11	0	(Football Association of Ireland) Wexford
2	DF	Leah O'Leary Calender	1 August 2010 (age 16)	4	0	(Football Association of Ireland) Cork City
3	DF	Keela Donnelly Meehan	31 January 2010 (age 16)	4	2	(Football Association of Ireland) Athlone Town
4	DF	Ruby Boland	20 May 2010 (age 16)	4	0	(Football Association of Ireland) Shamrock Rovers
12	DF	Ava Hallinan	26 May 2010 (age 16)	15	2	(Football Association of Ireland) Sligo Rovers
14	DF	Skye Barrett	29 September 2010 (age 16)	5	0	(Football Association of Ireland) Shamrock Rovers
17	DF	Ava Kelly	6 October 2010 (age 16)	4	1	(Football Association of Ireland) Shamrock Rovers
5	MF	Lara Dallaghan	26 January 2010 (age 16)	13	1	(Football Association of Ireland) Shamrock Rovers
6	MF	Fiadh Woods	19 March 2011 (age 15)	3	1	(Football Association of Ireland) Bohemian
8	MF	Ellen Goggin	11 May 2010 (age 16)	17	7	(Football Association of Ireland) Treaty United
10	MF	Maisy Healy	12 December 2011 (age 14)	5	3	(Football Association of Ireland) Bohemian
15	MF	Alannah Mooney	6 July 2010 (age 16)	2	1	(Football Association of Ireland) Shelbourne
18	MF	Caoimhe Devane	2 June 2010 (age 16)	2	0	(Football Association of Ireland) Shelbourne
7	FW	Hailey Twoney	31 March 2010 (age 16)	17	5	(Football Association of Ireland) Shamrock Rovers
9	FW	Ciara Milton	5 March 2010 (age 16)	17	8	(Football Association of Ireland) Shamrock Rovers
11	FW	Halle Harcourt	6 June 2010 (age 16)	14	2	(Football Association of Ireland) Shelbourne
13	FW	Abbie Duffy	27 January 2010 (age 16)	10	2	(Football Association of Ireland) Athlone Town
19	FW	Mia Whelan	31 July 2011 (age 15)	5	2	(Football Association of Ireland) Wexford
20	FW	Aoibhe Galvin	5 April 2011 (age 15)	5	0	(Football Association of Ireland) Shamrock Rovers

=== Recent call-ups ===
The following players have also been called up in the last 12 months and remain eligible:

Pos.	Player	Date of birth (age)	Caps	Goals	Club	Latest call-up
DF	Norah Pustay		2	0	(Republic of Ireland) Bohemian	v. Belgium, 9 September 2026
MF	Leah Hannon		2	0	(Republic of Ireland) Bohemian	v. Belgium, 9 September 2026
FW	Emily Staunton		2	0	(England) Liverpool	v. Belgium, 9 September 2026

== Head-to-head record ==
The following table shows Republic of Ireland's head-to-head record in the FIFA U-17 Women's World Cup.

Opponent	Pld	W	D	L	GF	GA	GD	Win %
Brazil	1	0	0	1	1	2	−1	0.00
Canada	1	1	0	0	1	0	+1	100.00
Ghana	1	1	0	0	3	0	+3	100.00
Japan	1	0	0	1	1	2	−1	0.00
Total	4	2	0	2	6	4	+2	50.00

== See also ==
- Republic of Ireland women's national football team
- Republic of Ireland women's national under-19 football team
- FIFA U-17 Women's World Cup
- UEFA Women's Under-17 Championship
