= Belgium women's national under-17 football team =

National U-17 association football team

Belgium Women's U-17
- Association: KBVB
- Confederation: UEFA (Europe)
- Head coach: Tamara Cassimon
- FIFA code: BEL

First international
- Belgium 5–1 Faroe Islands; 11 September 2007

Biggest win
- Belgium 15–0 Georgia; 29 September 2015

Biggest defeat
- Netherlands 6–0 Belgium; 4 October 2023; Belgium 0–6 England; 10 November 2023

Belgium women's national under-17 football team represents Belgium in international youth football competitions.

== Competitive record ==
=== FIFA U-17 Women's World Cup ===
The team has never qualified for the FIFA U-17 Women's World Cup.

Year	Result	Matches	Wins	Draws*	Losses	GF	GA
(New Zealand) 2008	did not qualify						
(Trinidad and Tobago) 2010	did not qualify						
(Azerbaijan) 2012	did not qualify						
(Costa Rica) 2014	did not qualify						
(Jordan) 2016	did not qualify						
(Uruguay) 2018	did not qualify						
(India) 2022	did not qualify						
(Dominican Republic) 2024	did not qualify						
(Morocco) 2025	did not qualify						
Total	0/9	0	0	0	0	0	0

=== UEFA Women's Under-17 Championship ===
The team has only qualified for the 2013 UEFA Women's Under-17 Championship and ended 4th.

Year	Result	MP	W	D	L	GF	GA
(Switzerland) 2008	did not qualify						
(Switzerland) 2009	did not qualify						
(Switzerland) 2010	did not qualify						
(Switzerland) 2011	did not qualify						
(Switzerland) 2012	did not qualify						
(Switzerland) 2013	Fourth place	2	0	0	2	1	7
(England) 2014	did not qualify						
(Iceland) 2015	did not qualify						
(Belarus) 2016	did not qualify						
(Czech Republic) 2017	did not qualify						
(Lithuania) 2018	did not qualify						
(Bulgaria) 2019	did not qualify						
(Sweden) ~~2020~~	Cancelled						
(Faroe Islands) ~~2021~~	Cancelled						
(Bosnia and Herzegovina) 2022	did not qualify						
(Estonia) 2023	did not qualify						
(Sweden) 2024	Group Stage	3	0	0	3	0	7
(Faroe Islands) 2025	Did not qualify						
(Northern Ireland) 2026	Did not qualify						
(Finland) 2027	to be determined						
(Belgium) 2028	Qualified as host						
(Turkey) 2029	to be determined						
Total	2/16	5	0	0	5	1	14

== See also ==
- Belgium women's national football team
