= 2020 UEFA Women's Under-17 Championship =

Tournament details
- Host country: Sweden
- Dates: Cancelled; Original schedule: 9–22 May; Revised schedule: 4–10 October
- Teams: 8 (from 1 confederation)
- Venue: 4 (in 4 host cities)

The 2020 UEFA Women's Under-17 Championship (also known as UEFA Women's Under-17 Euro 2020) was originally to be held as the 13th edition of the UEFA Women's Under-17 Championship, the annual international youth football championship organised by UEFA for the women's under-17 national teams of Europe, before being cancelled due to the COVID-19 pandemic. Sweden, which were selected by UEFA on 9 December 2016, were originally to host the tournament. A total of eight teams were originally to play in the tournament, with players born on or after 1 January 2003 eligible to participate.

The final tournament was originally scheduled to be played between 9–22 May 2020. Due to the COVID-19 pandemic, UEFA announced on 1 April 2020 that the tournament had been postponed until further notice. On 17 June 2020, UEFA announced that the final tournament had been rescheduled to 4–10 October 2020, and would be played in straight knock-out format, consisting of the quarter-finals, semi-finals, final, and the FIFA U-17 Women's World Cup play-off. However, UEFA announced on 13 August 2020 that after consultation with the 55 member associations, the tournament had been cancelled. However, FIFA announced on 17 November 2020 that this edition of the World Cup would be cancelled.

Same as previous editions held in even-numbered years, the tournament would act as the UEFA qualifiers for the FIFA U-17 Women's World Cup. The top three teams of the tournament would qualify for the 2021 FIFA U-17 Women's World Cup (originally 2020 but postponed due to COVID-19 pandemic) in India as the UEFA representatives. With the cancellation of the tournament, the UEFA Executive Committee nominated the three teams with the highest coefficient ranking for the qualifying draw, Spain, Germany and England, as the UEFA representatives.

Germany were to be the defending champions.

== Qualification ==
A total of 47 UEFA nations entered the competition, and with the hosts Sweden qualifying automatically, the other 46 teams competed in the qualifying competition to determine the remaining seven spots in the final tournament. The qualifying competition consisted of two rounds: Qualifying round, which took place in autumn 2019, and Elite round, which took place in spring 2020.

=== Qualified teams ===
The following teams originally qualified for the final tournament.

Team	Method of qualification	Appearance (planned)	Last appearance	Previous best performance
Sweden	Hosts	2nd	2013 (runners-up)	Runners-up (2013)
N/A	Elite round Group 1 winners			
N/A	Elite round Group 2 winners			
N/A	Elite round Group 3 winners			
N/A	Elite round Group 4 winners			
N/A	Elite round Group 5 winners			
N/A	Elite round Group 6 winners			
N/A	Elite round Group 7 winners			

=== Final draw ===
The final draw was originally to be held on 3 April 2020 in Halmstad, Sweden. The eight teams would have been drawn into two groups of four teams. There would have been no seeding, except that the hosts Sweden would have been assigned to position A1 in the draw.

The final draw for the straight knock-out tournament was later rescheduled to be held on 22 September 2020, at the UEFA headquarters in Nyon, Switzerland. The eight teams would have been split into four quarter-finals.

== Venues ==
The tournament was originally to be held in four venues:

- Falcon Alkoholfri Arena, Falkenberg
- Örjans Vall, Halmstad
- Påskbergsvallen, Varberg
- Ängelholms IP, Ängelholm

== Original format and schedule ==
Under the original format before the cancellation of the group stage, the group winners and runners-up would advance to the semi-finals. The semi-final winners would qualify for the 2020 FIFA U-17 Women's World Cup, and the semi-final losers would enter the FIFA U-17 Women's World Cup play-off for the final World Cup berth. The following matches would have been played under the original schedule in May 2020:

- Group A
  - 9 May 2020: Sweden v A4, A3 v A2
  - 12 May 2020: Sweden v A3, A2 v A4
  - 15 May 2020: A2 v Sweden, A4 v A3
- Group B
  - 10 May 2020: B1 v B4, B3 v B2
  - 13 May 2020: B1 v B3, B2 v B4
  - 16 May 2020: B2 v B1, B4 v B3
- Knockout stage
  - 19 May 2020: Winner Group A v Runner-up Group B (Semi-final 1), Winner Group B v Runner-up Group A (Semi-final 2)
  - 22 May 2020: Loser Semi-final 1 v Loser Semi-final 2 (FIFA U-17 Women's World Cup play-off), Winner Semi-final 1 v Winner Semi-final 2 (Final)

== Qualified teams for FIFA U-17 Women's World Cup ==
The following three teams from UEFA, nominated by the UEFA Executive Committee, would have qualified for the 2021 FIFA U-17 Women's World Cup before the tournament was cancelled.

Team	Qualified on	Previous appearances in FIFA U-17 Women's World Cup^{1}
Spain	13 August 2020	4 (2010, 2014, 2016, **2018**)
Germany	13 August 2020	6 (2008, 2010, 2012, 2014, 2016, 2018)
England	13 August 2020	2 (2008, 2016)

^{1} Bold indicates champions for that year. Italic indicates hosts for that year.
