= 2013 UEFA Women's Under-17 Championship =

Tournament details
- Host country: Switzerland
- Dates: 25–28 June
- Teams: 4
- Venue: 1 (in 1 host city)

Final positions
- Champions: Poland (1st title)
- Runners-up: Sweden
- Third place: Spain
- Fourth place: Belgium

Tournament statistics
- Matches played: 4
- Goals scored: 13 (3.25 per match)
- Top scorer(s): (Spain) Nahikari García (2 goals)
- Best player: (Poland) Ewa Pajor

The 2013 UEFA Women's Under-17 Championship was the sixth edition of the UEFA Women's Under-17 Championship. The first matches were played on 3 September 2012.

With the return of Slovakia, who haven't played since the inaugural edition, and U-17 newcomers Montenegro, a new record of 44 participating nations was set. The final tournament was played for the last time in Nyon with four teams. Starting the next edition of the tournament, eight countries will contest the final tournament with the host changing every edition.

Dutch player Vivianne Miedema set a competition record by netting eight goals in a match against Kazakhstan. She also became the tournament's all-time top scorer with 20 goals.

For the first time Belgium and Poland qualified for the final tournament, and also for the first time Germany failed to do so.

== Qualification ==
All 44 teams entered the first qualification round, consisting of 11 groups of 4 teams. The group winners and five best runners-up advanced to the second qualification round. In the second round, there were four groups of four teams and only the group winners advanced to the final tournament. For the first time Poland and Belgium reached the final tournament.

== Final round ==
2013 UEFA Women's Under-17 Championship teams and final round performance

The four group champions played the knockout stage in the Centre sportif de Colovray Nyon, Nyon, Switzerland in summer 2013. There will be two semifinals, a third place match and the final.

Semi-finals
25 June 2013
Belgium | 1
Poland | 3
25 June 2013
Spain | 2 (4)
Sweden (pen.) | 2 (5)

Final
28 June 2013
Poland | 1
Sweden | 0
Third place
28 June 2013
Belgium | 0
Spain | 4

=== Semifinals ===
25 June 2013
12:00

| Belgium | 1–3 | Poland |
|---|---|---|
| De Caigny 29' | Report | Konat 25'; Dudek 43'; Pajor 67' |

Colovray Sports Centre, Nyon
Referee: Vesna Budimir (Croatia)

25 June 2013
14:30

| Spain | 2–2 | Sweden |
|---|---|---|
| García 26'; Torre 75' | Report | Blackstenius 27'; Karlsson 62' |
Penalties
| Perea (penalty scored); Torre (penalty scored); Caldentey (penalty scored); Guijarro (penalty scored); Falcón (penalty missed); N. Garrote (penalty missed) | 4–5 | (penalty scored) Andersson; (penalty missed) Blackstenius; (penalty scored) Strömberg; (penalty scored) Angeldal; (penalty scored) Björn; (penalty scored) Holmgren |

Colovray Sports Centre, Nyon
Referee: Ivana Vlaić (Bosnia and Herzegovina)

=== Third place match ===
28 June 2013
12:00

| Belgium | 0–4 | Spain |
|---|---|---|
| | Report | Baetens 21' (o.g.); García 31'; Caldentey 40+2'; Guijarro 57' |

Centre sportif de Colovray Nyon, Nyon
Referee: Ivana Vlaić (Bosnia and Herzegovina)

=== Final ===
28 June 2013
14:30

| Poland | 1–0 | Sweden |
|---|---|---|
| Kamczyk 15' | Report |

Centre sportif de Colovray Nyon, Nyon
Referee: Vesna Budimir (Croatia)

2013 UEFA Women's Under-17 European champions

Poland
First title
