= 2026 UEFA Women's Under-17 Championship qualification =

Tournament details
- Dates: Round 1: 24 September – 2 December 2025; Round 2: 26 February – 8 April 2026
- Teams: 49 (from 1 confederation)

Tournament statistics
- Matches played: 138
- Goals scored: 482 (3.49 per match)
- Top scorer(s): (Faroe Islands) Kára Sigurðsson (Finland) Olivia Oulasvirta (Sweden) Fanny Peterson (7 goals each)

The 2026 UEFA Women's Under-17 Championship qualification was an under-17 women's national football team competition that determined the seven teams joining the automatically qualified host team Northern Ireland in the 2026 UEFA Women's Under-17 Championship final tournament.

Five national teams decided not to participate in the event, and Russia were excluded from the tournament due to the ongoing invasion of Ukraine. Therefore, including hosts Northern Ireland, 49 teams entered this qualification competition. The Round 1 of the qualification was played from 24 September to 2 December 2025, while the Round 2 was played from 26 February to 8 April 2026. Players born on or after 1 January 2009 were eligible to participate.

== Format ==
The qualification consists of two rounds, both with teams playing in two-tiered leagues. Each round league consists of several groups, which are played as single-round-robin mini-tournaments, with one team from each group selected as the host after the draw.

- Round 1:
  - League A: 28 teams were drawn into seven groups of four. The top three teams from each group will be transferred to Round 2 League A; teams that finished fourth will be relegated to Round 2 League B.
  - League B: 21 teams were drawn into six groups of three or four. The group winners and the best runner-up team will be promoted to Round 2 League A; the other teams will be transferred to Round 2 League B.
- Round 2:
  - League A: 28 teams will be drawn into seven groups of four. The group winners will qualify for the final tournament. If Northern Ireland, as the host of the final tournament, wins one of these groups, the best runner-up team will also qualify. Teams that will finish fourth will be relegated to Round 1 League B for the next season.
  - League B: 21 teams will be drawn into six groups of three or four. The group winners and the best runner-up team will be promoted to Round 1 League A for the next season.

=== Tiebreakers ===
In a group, teams are ranked according to points (3 points for a win, 1 point for a draw, 0 points for a loss), and if tied on points, the following tiebreaking criteria are applied, in the order given, to determine the rankings (Regulations Articles 17.01 and 17.02):

1. Points in head-to-head matches among tied teams;
2. Goal difference in head-to-head matches among tied teams;
3. Goals scored in head-to-head matches among tied teams;
4. If more than two teams are tied, and after applying all head-to-head criteria above, a subset of teams is still tied, all head-to-head criteria above are reapplied exclusively to this subset of teams;
5. Goal difference in all group matches;
6. Goals scored in all group matches;
7. Penalty shoot-out if only two teams have the same number of points, and they met in the last round of the group and are tied after applying all criteria above (not used if more than two teams have the same number of points, or if their rankings are not relevant for qualification for the next stage);
8. Disciplinary points (red card = 3 points, yellow card = 1 point, expulsion for two yellow cards in one match = 3 points);
9. Position in the applicable ranking:
  1. for teams in Round 1, position in the 2024–25 Round 2 league rankings;
  2. for teams in Round 2, position in the Round 1 league rankings.

To determine the best runner-up team in League B, the results against the teams in fourth place are discarded, and the following criteria are applied (Regulations Articles 18.01 and 18.03):

1. Points;
2. Goal difference;
3. Goals scored;
4. Disciplinary points;
5. Position in the applicable ranking:
  1. for teams in Round 1, position in the 2024–25 Round 2 league rankings;
  2. for teams in Round 2, position in the Round 1 league rankings.

== Round 1 ==
=== Draw ===
The draw for the Round 1 was held on 5 June 2025, at the UEFA headquarters in Nyon, Switzerland.

The 49 participating teams were split into two Leagues (28 in League A, 21 in League B) according to their final group standings of Round 2 of the 2024–25 competition (Regulations Article 13.01). To determine this ranking, the following criteria were followed:

1. higher position in the following classification:
  1. Round 2 League A group winners
  2. Round 2 League A group runners-up
  3. Round 2 League A third-placed teams
  4. Teams promoted from Round 2 League B
  5. Teams relegated from Round 2 League A
  6. Round 2 League B runners-up
  7. Round 2 League B third-placed teams
  8. Round 2 League B fourth-placed teams
2. higher number of points in all mini-tournament matches;
3. superior goal difference in all mini-tournament matches;
4. higher number of goals scored in all mini-tournament matches;
5. lower disciplinary points (red card = 3 points, yellow card = 1 point, expulsion for two yellow cards in one match = 3 points);
6. higher position in the 2024–25 Round 1 league rankings.

Within each League, the teams were allocated to four drawing pots (seven teams per pot in League A; six teams in Pots 1 to 3 and three teams in Pot 4 in League B). Teams in the same pot would be drawn into different groups, with League A consisting of seven groups of four teams, and League B consisting of three groups of four and three groups of three teams.

As decided by the UEFA Executive Committee and the UEFA Emergency Panel, Belarus and Ukraine could not be drawn in the same group in League A.

Teams entering League A

The 21 teams of the previous season's Round 2 League A (top three teams in each group) and the seven teams of Round 2 League B (six group winners and the best runner-up) were drawn into seven groups of four teams. The Round 2 League A group winners were automatically seeded into Pot 1, the second- and third-placed teams into Pots 2 and 3, respectively. The previous season's Round 2 League B teams were seeded into Pot 4; their matches against the fourth-placed teams in their group did not count towards this ranking (Regulations Article 13.02).

| Pos | Gr (Rk) | Team | Pld | W | D | L | GF | GA | GD | Pts | Seeding |
|---|---|---|---|---|---|---|---|---|---|---|---|
| 1 | A5 (1) | Netherlands | 3 | 3 | 0 | 0 | 13 | 4 | +9 | 9 | Pot 1 |
| 2 | A4 (1) | Poland | 3 | 3 | 0 | 0 | 9 | 1 | +8 | 9 | Pot 1 |
| 3 | A2 (1) | France | 3 | 3 | 0 | 0 | 8 | 1 | +7 | 9 | Pot 1 |
| 4 | A6 (1) | Norway | 3 | 3 | 0 | 0 | 7 | 1 | +6 | 9 | Pot 1 |
| 5 | A1 (1) | Spain | 3 | 3 | 0 | 0 | 7 | 2 | +5 | 9 | Pot 1 |
| 6 | A7 (1) | Austria | 3 | 2 | 1 | 0 | 8 | 0 | +8 | 7 | Pot 1 |
| 7 | A3 (1) | Italy | 3 | 2 | 1 | 0 | 6 | 0 | +6 | 7 | Pot 1 |
| 8 | A3 (2) | Czech Republic | 3 | 2 | 0 | 1 | 8 | 1 | +7 | 6 | Pot 2 |
| 9 | A6 (2) | Portugal | 3 | 2 | 0 | 1 | 7 | 1 | +6 | 6 | Pot 2 |
| 10 | A7 (2) | Denmark | 3 | 2 | 0 | 1 | 8 | 4 | +4 | 6 | Pot 2 |
| 11 | A4 (2) | Switzerland | 3 | 2 | 0 | 1 | 3 | 2 | +1 | 6 | Pot 2 |
| 12 | A1 (2) | Belgium | 3 | 2 | 0 | 1 | 6 | 6 | 0 | 6 | Pot 2 |
| 13 | A2 (2) | Scotland | 3 | 1 | 1 | 1 | 5 | 4 | +1 | 4 | Pot 2 |
| 14 | A5 (2) | Finland | 3 | 1 | 1 | 1 | 5 | 7 | −2 | 4 | Pot 2 |
| 15 | A7 (3) | Germany | 3 | 1 | 1 | 1 | 10 | 1 | +9 | 4 | Pot 3 |
| 16 | A3 (3) | Croatia | 3 | 1 | 1 | 1 | 8 | 1 | +7 | 4 | Pot 3 |
| 17 | A2 (3) | Slovakia | 3 | 1 | 1 | 1 | 3 | 4 | −1 | 4 | Pot 3 |
| 18 | A4 (3) | Hungary | 3 | 1 | 0 | 2 | 6 | 6 | 0 | 3 | Pot 3 |
| 19 | A1 (3) | Ukraine | 3 | 1 | 0 | 2 | 3 | 5 | −2 | 3 | Pot 3 |
| 20 | A5 (3) | England | 3 | 1 | 0 | 2 | 5 | 9 | −4 | 3 | Pot 3 |
| 21 | A6 (3) | Serbia | 3 | 1 | 0 | 2 | 2 | 9 | −7 | 3 | Pot 3 |
| 22 | B2 (1) | Bulgaria | 2 | 2 | 0 | 0 | 9 | 0 | +9 | 6 | Pot 4 |
| 23 | B6 (1) | North Macedonia | 2 | 2 | 0 | 0 | 6 | 0 | +6 | 6 | Pot 4 |
| 24 | B4 (1) | Romania | 2 | 2 | 0 | 0 | 4 | 0 | +4 | 6 | Pot 4 |
| 25 | B5 (1) | Republic of Ireland | 2 | 2 | 0 | 0 | 8 | 5 | +3 | 6 | Pot 4 |
| 26= | B3 (1) | Belarus | 2 | 1 | 1 | 0 | 3 | 2 | +1 | 4 | Pot 4 |
| 26= | B1 (1) | Montenegro | 2 | 1 | 1 | 0 | 3 | 2 | +1 | 4 | Pot 4 |
| 28 | B3 (2) | Andorra | 2 | 1 | 1 | 0 | 1 | 0 | +1 | 4 | Pot 4 |

Source: UEFA
Rules for classification: 1) round 1 position; 2) points; 3) goal difference; 4) goals scored; 5) disciplinary points; 6) position in the applicable rankings.

Teams entering League B

The seven fourth-placed teams of the previous season's Round 2 League A and the 14 non-promoted teams of Round 2 League B were drawn into six groups of three or four teams. The best six fourth-placed teams of Round 2 League A were automatically seeded into Pot 1. The seventh fourth-placed team of Round 2 League A and the runner-up teams of Round 2 League B were seeded into Pot 2. The third- and fourth-placed teams of the previous season's Round 2 League B were seeded into Pots 3 and 4, respectively. The matches of the second- and third-placed teams of Round 2 League B against the fourth-placed teams in their group did not count towards this ranking (Regulations Article 13.02).

| Pos | Gr (Rk) | Team | Pld | W | D | L | GF | GA | GD | Pts | Seeding |
|---|---|---|---|---|---|---|---|---|---|---|---|
| 1 | A5 (4) | Bulgaria | 3 | 0 | 1 | 2 | 0 | 4 | −4 | 1 | Pot 1 |
| 2 | A2 (4) | Bosnia and Herzegovina | 3 | 0 | 0 | 3 | 0 | 5 | −5 | 0 | Pot 1 |
| 3 | A6 (4) | Republic of Ireland | 3 | 0 | 0 | 3 | 3 | 11 | −8 | 0 | Pot 1 |
| 4 | A4 (4) | Northern Ireland | 3 | 0 | 0 | 3 | 0 | 9 | −9 | 0 | Pot 1 |
| 5 | A7 (4) | Belarus | 3 | 0 | 0 | 3 | 0 | 12 | −12 | 0 | Pot 1 |
| 6 | A1 (4) | Slovenia | 0 | 0 | 0 | 0 | 1 | 18 | −17 | 0 | Pot 1 |
| 7 | A3 (4) | Faroe Islands | 3 | 0 | 0 | 3 | 0 | 23 | −23 | 0 | Pot 2 |
| 8 | B5 (2) | Luxembourg | 2 | 1 | 0 | 1 | 4 | 3 | +1 | 3 | Pot 2 |
| 9= | B4 (2) | Albania | 2 | 1 | 0 | 1 | 3 | 4 | −1 | 3 | Pot 2 |
| 9= | B2 (2) | Romania | 2 | 1 | 0 | 1 | 3 | 4 | −1 | 3 | Pot 2 |
| 11 | B6 (2) | Estonia | 2 | 1 | 0 | 1 | 6 | 12 | −6 | 3 | Pot 2 |
| 12 | B3 (2) | North Macedonia | 2 | 0 | 2 | 0 | 2 | 2 | 0 | 2 | Pot 2 |
| 13 | B4 (3) | Israel | 2 | 0 | 1 | 1 | 2 | 3 | −1 | 1 | Pot 3 |
| 14 | B3 (3) | Lithuania | 2 | 0 | 1 | 1 | 1 | 4 | −3 | 1 | Pot 3 |
| 15 | B1 (3) | Latvia | 2 | 0 | 0 | 2 | 2 | 8 | −6 | 0 | Pot 3 |
| 16 | B2 (3) | Moldova | 2 | 0 | 0 | 2 | 1 | 8 | −7 | 0 | Pot 3 |
| 17 | B5 (3) | Azerbaijan | 2 | 0 | 0 | 2 | 0 | 13 | −13 | 0 | Pot 3 |
| 18 | B6 (3) | Kazakhstan | 2 | 0 | 0 | 2 | 1 | 17 | −16 | 0 | Pot 3 |
| 19 | B1 (4) | Montenegro | 3 | 0 | 0 | 3 | 2 | 9 | −7 | 0 | Pot 4 |
| 20 | B3 (4) | Andorra | 3 | 0 | 0 | 3 | 2 | 11 | −9 | 0 | Pot 4 |
| 21 | B2 (4) | Malta | 3 | 0 | 0 | 3 | 2 | 16 | −14 | 0 | Pot 4 |

Source: UEFA
Rules for classification: 1) round 1 position; 2) points; 3) goal difference; 4) goals scored; 5) disciplinary points; 6) position in the applicable rankings.

Did not enter

- Armenia
- Cyprus
- Gibraltar
- Liechtenstein
- San Marino

Banned

- Russia

=== League A ===
Times are CET/CEST, (Note: CEST (UTC+2) for dates up to 25 October 2025, and CET (UTC+1) for dates thereafter.) as listed by UEFA (local times, if different, are in parentheses).

==== Group A1 ====
| Pos | Team | Pld | W | D | L | GF | GA | GD | Pts | Transfer or relegation |
|---|---|---|---|---|---|---|---|---|---|---|
| 1 | Spain | 3 | 3 | 0 | 0 | 10 | 1 | +9 | 9 | Transfer to Round 2 League A |
| 2 | Portugal (H) | 3 | 2 | 0 | 1 | 5 | 2 | +3 | 6 | Transfer to Round 2 League A |
| 3 | Hungary | 3 | 1 | 0 | 2 | 6 | 3 | +3 | 3 | Transfer to Round 2 League A |
| 4 | Bulgaria | 3 | 0 | 0 | 3 | 1 | 16 | −15 | 0 | Relegation to Round 2 League B |

Source: www.sofascore.com
Rules for classification: Tiebreakers
(H) Hosts
26 November 2025
13:00

| Spain | 6–1 | Bulgaria |
|---|---|---|
| Díaz 14', 48'; Ferrera 61', 82'; Cabetas 69'; Elaine 87' | Report | Varbanov 44' |

Real Sport Clube, Queluz
Attendance: 24
Referee: Abbie Hendry (Scotland)
26 November 2025
17:00

| Hungary | 0–1 | Portugal |
|---|---|---|
| | Report | Sá 90+2' |

Cidade do Futebol, Oeiras
Attendance: 97
Referee: Jelena Kumer (Croatia)

29 November 2025
12:00

| Spain | 2–0 | Hungary |
|---|---|---|
| Molina 5'; Chacón 28' | Report |

Real Sport Clube, Queluz
Attendance: 25
Referee: Eirini Pingiou (Greece)
29 November 2025
16:00

| Portugal | 4–0 | Bulgaria |
|---|---|---|
| Matos 36'; Loução 42'; Popova 58' (o.g.); Stoyanova 90+2' (o.g.) | Report |

Cidade do Futebol, Oeiras
Attendance: 173
Referee: Jelena Kumer (Croatia)

2 December 2025
18:00

| Portugal | 0–2 | Spain |
|---|---|---|
| | Report | Elaine 6'; Cabetas 43' |

Cidade do Futebol, Oeiras
Attendance: 105
Referee: Eirini Pingiou (Greece)
2 December 2025
18:00

| Bulgaria | 0–6 | Hungary |
|---|---|---|
| | Report | Sági 29'; Pethe 48'; Farkas 62'; Érsek 64'; Kovács 79'; Oszlánczi 86' |

Real Sport Clube, Queluz
Attendance: 15
Referee: Abbie Hendry (Scotland)

==== Group A2 ====
| Pos | Team | Pld | W | D | L | GF | GA | GD | Pts | Transfer or relegation |
|---|---|---|---|---|---|---|---|---|---|---|
| 1 | France | 3 | 3 | 0 | 0 | 6 | 1 | +5 | 9 | Transferred to Round 2 League A |
| 2 | Germany (H) | 3 | 2 | 0 | 1 | 4 | 2 | +2 | 6 | Transferred to Round 2 League A |
| 3 | Republic of Ireland | 3 | 1 | 0 | 2 | 4 | 4 | 0 | 3 | Transferred to Round 2 League A |
| 4 | Belgium | 3 | 0 | 0 | 3 | 2 | 9 | −7 | 0 | Relegated to Round 2 League B |

Source: www.sofascore.com
Rules for classification: Tiebreakers
(H) Hosts
23 October 2025
13:30

| Germany | 2–1 | Belgium |
|---|---|---|
| Dafinger 23'; Noack 38' | Report | Hoekx 78' |

DFB-Campus, Frankfurt
Attendance: 110
Referee: Hanna Laajanen (Sweden)
23 October 2025
17:00

| France | 2–0 | Republic of Ireland |
|---|---|---|
| Ane 19'; L. Motyka 90+2' | Report |

DFB-Campus, Frankfurt
Attendance: 50
Referee: Marta San Juan (Andorra)

26 October 2025
13:00

| France | 1–0 | Germany |
|---|---|---|
| Dhalluin 90+1' | Report |

DFB-Campus, Frankfurt
Attendance: 280
Referee: Sofiya Prychyna (Ukraine)
26 October 2025
16:30

| Belgium | 0–4 | Republic of Ireland |
|---|---|---|
| | Report | Milton 21', 52', 58'; Comiskey 83' |

DFB-Campus, Frankfurt
Attendance: 80
Referee: Hanna Laajanen (Sweden)

29 October 2025
13:00

| Belgium | 1–3 | France |
|---|---|---|
| Hoekx 33' | Report | Collin 17'; L. Motyka 9', 43' (pen.) |

Sportpark Kelsterbach, Kelsterbach
Attendance: 90
Referee: Sofiya Prychyna (Ukraine)
29 October 2025
13:00

| Republic of Ireland | 0–2 | Germany |
|---|---|---|
| | Report | Säring 13'; Choisy 65' |

DFB-Campus, Frankfurt
Attendance: 180
Referee: Marta San Juan (Andorra)

==== Group A3 ====
| Pos | Team | Pld | W | D | L | GF | GA | GD | Pts | Transfer or relegation |
|---|---|---|---|---|---|---|---|---|---|---|
| 1 | Netherlands (H) | 3 | 2 | 1 | 0 | 10 | 0 | +10 | 7 | Transferred to Round 2 League A |
| 2 | Czech Republic | 3 | 2 | 1 | 0 | 5 | 0 | +5 | 7 | Transferred to Round 2 League A |
| 3 | Slovakia | 3 | 1 | 0 | 2 | 3 | 8 | −5 | 3 | Transferred to Round 2 League A |
| 4 | Andorra | 3 | 0 | 0 | 3 | 0 | 10 | −10 | 0 | Relegated to Round 2 League B |

Source: www.sofascore.com
Rules for classification: Tiebreakers
(H) Hosts
24 September 2025
19:00

| Netherlands | 4–0 | Andorra |
|---|---|---|
| Mendes Ros 5'; Deitelzweig 80'; van Dijk 82'; Laman 85' | Report |

Sportpark de Bosk, Harkema
Attendance: 111
Referee: Teona Sturua (Georgia)
24 September 2025
19:00

| Slovakia | 0–2 | Czech Republic |
|---|---|---|
| | Report | Šafářová 22', 49' |

Stadion Marsdijk, Assen
Attendance: 62
Referee: Sara Telek (Austria)

27 September 2025
13:00

| Czech Republic | 3–0 | Andorra |
|---|---|---|
| Kynclová 6'; Pešková 17'; Nechutová 37' | Report |

Sportpark de Bosk, Harkema
Attendance: 28
Referee: Sara Telek (Austria)
27 September 2025
16:00

| Netherlands | 6–0 | Slovakia |
|---|---|---|
| Laman 5', 39'; Wessels 36'; Onwusaka 45+3'; Boers 56'; Klinckhamers 63' | Report |

Stadion Marsdijk, Assen
Attendance: 178
Referee: Audrey Gerbel (France)

30 September 2025
19:00

| Czech Republic | 0–0 | Netherlands |
|---|---|---|
| | Report |

Sportpark de Bosk, Harkema
Attendance: 189
Referee: Audrey Gerbel (France)
30 September 2025
19:00

| Andorra | 0–3 | Slovakia |
|---|---|---|
| | Report | Rudinská 21'; Fernandes 29' (o.g.); Oroszi 55' |

Stadion Marsdijk, Assen
Attendance: 53
Referee: Teona Sturua (Georgia)

==== Group A4 ====
| Pos | Team | Pld | W | D | L | GF | GA | GD | Pts | Transfer or relegation |
|---|---|---|---|---|---|---|---|---|---|---|
| 1 | England | 3 | 3 | 0 | 0 | 11 | 3 | +8 | 9 | Transferred to Round 2 League A |
| 2 | Poland (H) | 3 | 2 | 0 | 1 | 16 | 3 | +13 | 6 | Transferred to Round 2 League A |
| 3 | Scotland | 3 | 0 | 1 | 2 | 1 | 8 | −7 | 1 | Transferred to Round 2 League A |
| 4 | Montenegro | 3 | 0 | 1 | 2 | 0 | 14 | −14 | 1 | Relegated to Round 2 League B |

Source: www.sofascore.com
Rules for classification: Tiebreakers
(H) Hosts
8 October 2025
11:00

| England | 3–1 | Scotland |
|---|---|---|
| Brodie 40'; Oboavwoduo 65'; Burton 85' | Report | Crawford 69' |

Stadion Miejski w Rumii, Rumia
Attendance: 173
Referee: Marisca Overtoom (The Netherlands)
8 October 2025
15:00

| Poland | 9–0 | Montenegro |
|---|---|---|
| Zając 30'; Gałuszka 32', 47'; Prochwicz 33'; Petrovic 40' (o.g.); Cendrowska 45+1', 85'; Muszyńska 71'; Grzechnik 90+2' | Report |

Arena Mistrzów, Gniewino
Attendance: 114
Referee: Laura Mauricio (Switzerland)

11 October 2025
12:00

| Scotland | 0–0 | Montenegro |
|---|---|---|
| | Report |

Arena Mistrzów, Gniewino
Attendance: 68
Referee: Marisca Overtoom (The Netherlands)
11 October 2025
17:00

| Poland | 2–3 | England |
|---|---|---|
| Prochwicz 28'; Zając 45' | Report | Brodie 24'; Oboavwoduo 70'; Dixon 80' |

Stadion Miejski, Gdynia
Attendance: 423
Referee: Asen Albayrak (Türkiye)

14 October 2025
14:00

| Scotland | 0–5 | Poland |
|---|---|---|
| | Report | Grzechnik 37'; Skrzypczak 44'; Burzan 48', 69'; Zając 60' |

Stadion Miejski w Rumii, Rumia
Attendance: 618
Referee: Asen Albayrak (Türkiye)
14 October 2025
14:00

| Montenegro | 0–5 | England |
|---|---|---|
| | Report | N'Drin 15', 33'; Scott 29'; Ciccardini 42'; Cowley 90+5' |

Arena Mistrzów, Gniewino
Attendance: 61
Referee: Laura Mauricio (Switzerland)

==== Group A5 ====
| Pos | Team | Pld | W | D | L | GF | GA | GD | Pts | Transfer or relegation |
|---|---|---|---|---|---|---|---|---|---|---|
| 1 | Finland | 3 | 3 | 0 | 0 | 15 | 2 | +13 | 9 | Transferred to Round 2 League A |
| 2 | Italy | 3 | 2 | 0 | 1 | 5 | 4 | +1 | 6 | Transferred to Round 2 League A |
| 3 | Croatia (H) | 3 | 1 | 0 | 2 | 3 | 5 | −2 | 3 | Transferred to Round 2 League A |
| 4 | North Macedonia | 3 | 0 | 0 | 3 | 0 | 12 | −12 | 0 | Relegated to Round 2 League B |

Source: www.sofascore.com
Rules for classification: Tiebreakers
(H) Hosts
23 October 2025
12:30

| Croatia | 1–3 | Finland |
|---|---|---|
| Čikvar 37' | Report | Oulasvirta 39'; Stefanović 60' (o.g.); Välkky 63' |

Stadion Branko Čavlović-Čavlek, Karlovac
Attendance: 120
Referee: Emily Heaslip (England)
23 October 2025
15:00

| Italy | 2–0 | North Macedonia |
|---|---|---|
| Oddina 7'; Battocchio 68' | Report |

Town Stadium, Vrbovec
Attendance: 20
Referee: Audrey Gerbel (France)

26 October 2025
12:30

| Italy | 2–1 | Croatia |
|---|---|---|
| Ferranti 54'; Ciurleo 90+2' | Report | Bubica 12' |

Stadion Branko Čavlović-Čavlek, Karlovac
Attendance: 130
Referee: Eugenia Gil Soriano (Spain)
26 October 2025
15:00

| Finland | 9–0 | North Macedonia |
|---|---|---|
| Sarelius 18'; Oulasvirta 20'; Kupila 37'; Surakka 39', 55', 57', 63' (pen.); Mero 70'; Björndahl 71' | Report |

Town Stadium, Vrbovec
Attendance: 40
Referee: Emily Heaslip (England)

29 October 2025
12:30

| Finland | 3–1 | Italy |
|---|---|---|
| Seppänen 21'; Lamberg 44'; Välkky 52' | Report | Ferranti 28' |

Town Stadium, Vrbovec
Attendance: 30
Referee: Eugenia Gil Soriano (Spain)
29 October 2025
12:30

| North Macedonia | 0–1 | Croatia |
|---|---|---|
| | Report | Krunić 63' |

Stadion Branko Čavlović-Čavlek, Karlovac
Attendance: 100
Referee: Audrey Gerbel (France)

==== Group A6 ====
| Pos | Team | Pld | W | D | L | GF | GA | GD | Pts | Transfer or relegation |
|---|---|---|---|---|---|---|---|---|---|---|
| 1 | Switzerland | 3 | 2 | 1 | 0 | 4 | 2 | +2 | 7 | Transfer to Round 2 League A |
| 2 | Austria | 3 | 1 | 2 | 0 | 5 | 1 | +4 | 5 | Transfer to Round 2 League A |
| 3 | Romania (H) | 3 | 0 | 2 | 1 | 2 | 3 | −1 | 2 | Transfer to Round 2 League A |
| 4 | Ukraine | 3 | 0 | 1 | 2 | 1 | 6 | −5 | 1 | Relegation to Round 2 League B |

Source: www.sofascore.com
Rules for classification: Tiebreakers
(H) Hosts
26 November 2025
11:00

| Austria | 0–0 | Romania |
|---|---|---|
| | Report |

Football Centre FRF, Buftea
Attendance: 50
Referee: Ioanna Allayiotou (Cyprus)
26 November 2025
11:00

| Ukraine | 0–1 | Switzerland |
|---|---|---|
| | Report | Leutwyler 90+5' |

Concordia Stadium, Chiajna
Attendance: 102
Referee: Filipa Pereira Cunha (Portugal)

29 November 2025
10:00

| Austria | 4–0 | Ukraine |
|---|---|---|
| Zöger 11'; Emeji 45', 45+4'; Lampl 88' | Report |

Football Centre FRF, Buftea
Attendance: 35
Referee: Charlotte Carpenter (Wales)
29 November 2025
15:00

| Switzerland | 2–1 | Romania |
|---|---|---|
| Steffen 48'; Leutwyler 63' | Report | Cojanu 3' |

Football Centre FRF, Buftea
Attendance: 100
Referee: Filipa Pereira Cunha (Portugal)

2 December 2025
11:00

| Switzerland | 1–1 | Austria |
|---|---|---|
| Nein 15' | Report | Zöger 70' |

Tunari Stadium, Tunari
Attendance: 64
Referee: Charlotte Carpenter (Wales)
2 December 2025
11:00

| Romania | 1–1 | Ukraine |
|---|---|---|
| Crisan 85' | Report | Lespukh 73' |

Football Centre FRF, Buftea
Attendance: 35
Referee: Ioanna Allayiotou (Cyprus)

==== Group A7 ====
| Pos | Team | Pld | W | D | L | GF | GA | GD | Pts | Transfer or relegation |
|---|---|---|---|---|---|---|---|---|---|---|
| 1 | Denmark | 3 | 3 | 0 | 0 | 11 | 0 | +11 | 9 | Transferred to Round 2 League A |
| 2 | Norway | 3 | 1 | 1 | 1 | 7 | 5 | +2 | 4 | Transferred to Round 2 League A |
| 3 | Serbia (H) | 3 | 0 | 2 | 1 | 4 | 7 | −3 | 2 | Transferred to Round 2 League A |
| 4 | Belarus | 3 | 0 | 1 | 2 | 2 | 12 | −10 | 1 | Relegated to Round 2 League B |

Source: www.sofascore.com
Rules for classification: Tiebreakers
(H) Hosts
22 October 2025
11:00

| Norway | 5–0 | Belarus |
|---|---|---|
| Fedeler 19', 26'; Solemdal 34'; Hoem 65'; Lundhaug 76' | Report |

FK Jedinstvo, Stara Pazova
Attendance: 50
Referee: Elisabet Calvo Valentín (Spain)
22 October 2025
14:00

| Serbia | 0–3 | Denmark |
|---|---|---|
| | Report | Bischoff 56' (pen.), 71'; Østersø 68' |

Serbian FA Sports Center, Stara Pazova
Attendance: 108
Referee: Anna Adamska (Poland)

25 October 2025
11:00

| Denmark | 5–0 | Belarus |
|---|---|---|
| Bischoff 12'; Engsig-Karup 19', 58'; Nielsen 63', 78' | Report |

FK Jedinstvo, Stara Pazova
Attendance: 48
Referee: Anna Adamska (Poland)
25 October 2025
14:00

| Norway | 2–2 | Serbia |
|---|---|---|
| Fedeler 9'; Sæterøy 52' | Report | Šipka 3', 44' |

Serbian FA Sports Center, Stara Pazova
Attendance: 148
Referee: Zoe Stavrou (Cyprus)

28 October 2025
12:00

| Denmark | 3–0 | Norway |
|---|---|---|
| Engsig-Karup 3'; Fredsted 30'; Nielsen 57' | Report |

FK Jedinstvo, Stara Pazova
Attendance: 50
Referee: Zoe Stavrou (Cyprus)
28 October 2025
12:00

| Belarus | 2–2 | Serbia |
|---|---|---|
| Vasilevich 6'; Tuz 84' | Report | Topić 23'; Burgić 86' |

Serbian FA Sports Center, Stara Pazova
Attendance: 120
Referee: Elisabet Calvo Valentín (Spain)

=== League B ===
Times are CET/CEST, as listed by UEFA (local times, if different, are in parentheses).

==== Group B1 ====
| Pos | Team | Pld | W | D | L | GF | GA | GD | Pts | Promotion or transfer |
|---|---|---|---|---|---|---|---|---|---|---|
| 1 | Wales | 3 | 2 | 1 | 0 | 13 | 2 | +11 | 7 | Promoted to Round 2 League A |
| 2 | Kosovo | 3 | 2 | 1 | 0 | 8 | 1 | +7 | 7 | Promoted to Round 2 League A |
| 3 | Moldova (H) | 3 | 0 | 1 | 2 | 1 | 6 | −5 | 1 | Transferred to Round 2 League B |
| 4 | Azerbaijan | 3 | 0 | 1 | 2 | 0 | 13 | −13 | 1 | Transferred to Round 2 League B |

Source: www.sofascore.com
Rules for classification: Tiebreakers
(H) Hosts
24 October 2025
11:00 (12:00 UTC+3)

| Moldova | 0–1 | Kosovo |
|---|---|---|
| | Report | Godeni 75' |

Sheriff Arena, Tiraspol
Attendance: 45
Referee: Briet Bragadottir (Iceland)
24 October 2025
13:00 (14:00 UTC+3)

| Wales | 7–0 | Azerbaijan |
|---|---|---|
| Stroud 29', 90+4'; Giddings 37'; Griffiths 47', 90+1' (pen.); Drury 60', 84' | Report |

Zimbru Stadium, Chișinău
Attendance: 30
Referee: Ugne Šmitaite (Lithuania)

27 October 2025
11:00 (12:00 UTC+3)

| Kosovo | 6–0 | Azerbaijan |
|---|---|---|
| Meha 8', 57' (pen.); Halili 27'; Godeni 33'; Kelmendi 34'; Maliqi 48' | Report |

Sheriff Arena, Tiraspol
Attendance: 15
Referee: Briet Bragadottir (Iceland)
27 October 2025
13:00 (14:00 UTC+3)

| Wales | 5–1 | Moldova |
|---|---|---|
| Giddings 29', 34'; Griffiths 45'; Yau 76'; Marsh 81' | Report | Jumbei 89' |

Zimbru Stadium, Chișinău
Attendance: 100
Referee: Jeļena Jermolajeva (Latvia)

30 October 2025
12:00 (13:00 UTC+3)

| Kosovo | 1–1 | Wales |
|---|---|---|
| Kelmendi 56' | Report | Griffiths 45+3' |

Sheriff Arena, Tiraspol
Attendance: 20
Referee: Jeļena Jermolajeva (Latvia)
30 October 2025
12:00 (13:00 UTC+3)

| Azerbaijan | 0–0 | Moldova |
|---|---|---|
| | Report |

Zimbru Stadium, Chișinău
Attendance: 150
Referee: Ugne Šmitaite (Lithuania)

==== Group B2 ====
| Pos | Team | Pld | W | D | L | GF | GA | GD | Pts | Promotion or transfer |
|---|---|---|---|---|---|---|---|---|---|---|
| 1 | Greece | 3 | 2 | 1 | 0 | 5 | 2 | +3 | 7 | Promoted to Round 2 League A |
| 2 | Israel | 3 | 1 | 2 | 0 | 6 | 4 | +2 | 5 | Transferred to Round 2 League B |
| 3 | Albania (H) | 3 | 0 | 2 | 1 | 3 | 5 | −2 | 2 | Transferred to Round 2 League B |
| 4 | Estonia | 3 | 0 | 1 | 2 | 3 | 6 | −3 | 1 | Transferred to Round 2 League B |

Source: www.sofascore.com
Rules for classification: Tiebreakers
(H) Hosts
17 October 2025
12:00

| Israel | 3–1 | Estonia |
|---|---|---|
| Fabian 53'; Carmil 67'; Divan 88' | Report | Pihlak 64' |

Egnatia Arena, Rrogozhinë
Attendance: 20
Referee: Karoline Marie Jensen (Norway)
17 October 2025
14:00

| Greece | 2–0 | Albania |
|---|---|---|
| Schortsianiti 55'; Papourtzi 86' | Report |

Elbasan Arena, Elbasan
Attendance: 42
Referee: Farida Lutfaliyeva (Azerbaijan)

20 October 2025
12:00

| Greece | 1–1 | Israel |
|---|---|---|
| Lamprou 86' | Report | Babajanov 8' |

Egnatia Arena, Rrogozhinë
Attendance: 20
Referee: Liudmyla Telbukh (Ukraine)
20 October 2025
14:00

| Estonia | 1–1 | Albania |
|---|---|---|
| Pihlak 76' (pen.) | Report | Sootaga 29' (o.g.) |

Elbasan Arena, Elbasan
Attendance: 30
Referee: Karoline Marie Jensen (Norway)

23 October 2025
14:00

| Estonia | 1–2 | Greece |
|---|---|---|
| Gabriel 83' | Report | Krystalli 89'; Bataoula 90+2' |

Egnatia Arena, Rrogozhinë
Attendance: 20
Referee: Liudmyla Telbukh (Ukraine)
23 October 2025
14:00

| Albania | 2–2 | Israel |
|---|---|---|
| Hysenaj 4'; Demiraj 77' | Report | Fabian 21'; Ifrach 80' |

Elbasan Arena, Elbasan
Attendance: 40
Referee: Farida Lutfaliyeva (Azerbaijan)

==== Group B3 ====
| Pos | Team | Pld | W | D | L | GF | GA | GD | Pts | Promotion or transfer |
|---|---|---|---|---|---|---|---|---|---|---|
| 1 | Latvia | 3 | 2 | 0 | 1 | 4 | 3 | +1 | 6 | Promoted to Round 2 League A |
| 2 | Kazakhstan (H) | 3 | 1 | 1 | 1 | 4 | 3 | +1 | 4 | Transferred to Round 2 League B |
| 3 | Bosnia and Herzegovina | 3 | 1 | 1 | 1 | 2 | 2 | 0 | 4 | Transferred to Round 2 League B |
| 4 | Georgia | 3 | 1 | 0 | 2 | 6 | 8 | −2 | 3 | Transferred to Round 2 League B |

Source: www.sofascore.com
Rules for classification: Tiebreakers
(H) Hosts
24 October 2025
08:00 (12:00 UTC+5)

| Latvia | 1–0 | Bosnia and Herzegovina |
|---|---|---|
| Zviedre 4' | Report |

Technical Center, Talgar
Attendance: 100
Referee: Eglantina Pjetrushaj (Albania)
24 October 2025
12:00 (15:00 UTC+5)

| Georgia | 2–4 | Kazakhstan |
|---|---|---|
| Tsikaridze 48'; Buchukuri 90+1' | Report | Jumazhanova 12', 14'; Oster 28'; Zholbolat 44' |

Technical Center, Talgar
Attendance: 100
Referee: Melek Dakan (Türkiye)

27 October 2025
08:00 (12:00 UTC+5)

| Georgia | 3–2 | Latvia |
|---|---|---|
| Chkhetiani 15', 81'; Kakulia 24' | Report | Haritonova 6'; Artemjeva 59' (pen.) |

Almaty Central Stadium, Almaty
Attendance: 100
Referee: Oxana Cruc (Moldova)
27 October 2025
11:00 (14:00 UTC+5)

| Bosnia and Herzegovina | 0–0 | Kazakhstan |
|---|---|---|
| | Report |

Technical Center, Talgar
Attendance: 150
Referee: Eglantina Pjetrushaj (Albania)

30 October 2025
11:00 (14:00 UTC+5)

| Bosnia and Herzegovina | 2–1 | Georgia |
|---|---|---|
| Marić 36'; Maksimović 76' | Report | Tsikaridze 35' |

Almaty Central Stadium, Almaty
Attendance: 100
Referee: Oxana Cruc (Moldova)
30 October 2025
11:00 (14:00 UTC+5)

| Kazakhstan | 0–1 | Latvia |
|---|---|---|
| | Report | Paegle 80' |

Technical Center, Talgar
Attendance: 100
Referee: Melek Dakan (Türkiye)

==== Group B4 ====
| Pos | Team | Pld | W | D | L | GF | GA | GD | Pts | Promotion or transfer |
|---|---|---|---|---|---|---|---|---|---|---|
| 1 | Turkey | 2 | 2 | 0 | 0 | 5 | 2 | +3 | 6 | Promoted to Round 2 League A |
| 2 | Northern Ireland | 2 | 1 | 0 | 1 | 3 | 3 | 0 | 3 | Transferred to Round 2 League B |
| 3 | Luxembourg (H) | 2 | 0 | 0 | 2 | 2 | 5 | −3 | 0 | Transferred to Round 2 League B |

Source: www.sofascore.com
Rules for classification: Tiebreakers
(H) Hosts
3 November 2025
15:00

| Luxembourg | 1–3 | Turkey |
|---|---|---|
| Dietrich 58' | Report | Balci 22'; Demirtaş 36'; Pılıç 72' |

Stade Jean Donnersbach, Lintgen
Attendance: 362
Referee: Emilie Torkelsen (Norway)

6 November 2025
15:00

| Turkey | 2–1 | Northern Ireland |
|---|---|---|
| Demirtaş 13'; Gür 76' (pen.) | Report | Robinson 68' |

Stade Jean Donnersbach, Lintgen
Attendance: 101
Referee: Rita Vehapi (Kosovo)

9 November 2025
15:00

| Northern Ireland | 2–1 | Luxembourg |
|---|---|---|
| Smyth 63', 83' | Report | Riggio 71' |

Stade Jean Donnersbach, Lintgen
Attendance: 312
Referee: Tatyana Sorokopudova (Kazakhstan)

==== Group B5 ====
| Pos | Team | Pld | W | D | L | GF | GA | GD | Pts | Promotion or transfer |
|---|---|---|---|---|---|---|---|---|---|---|
| 1 | Sweden | 2 | 2 | 0 | 0 | 12 | 0 | +12 | 6 | Promoted to Round 2 League A |
| 2 | Lithuania | 2 | 1 | 0 | 1 | 3 | 10 | −7 | 3 | Transferred to Round 2 League B |
| 3 | Malta (H) | 2 | 0 | 0 | 2 | 1 | 6 | −5 | 0 | Transferred to Round 2 League B |

Source: www.sofascore.com
Rules for classification: Tiebreakers
(H) Hosts
3 November 2025
13:00

| Malta | 1–3 | Lithuania |
|---|---|---|
| Borg 84' | Report | Blaževičūtė 3', 60', 76' |

Centenary Stadium, Ta' Qali
Attendance: 180
Referee: Duygu Hatice Aydin (Türkiye)

6 November 2025
13:00

| Lithuania | 0–9 | Sweden |
|---|---|---|
| | Report | Myrén 19', 43'; Peterson 22', 30' (pen.), 62'; Breland 39'; Widén 57' (pen.), 85'; Berbatovci 90+5' |

Centenary Stadium, Ta' Qali
Attendance: 53
Referee: Kristina Kozoroh (Ukraine)

9 November 2025
12:00

| Sweden | 3–0 | Malta |
|---|---|---|
| Peterson 63'; Breland 90+3'; Rådsjö 90+5' | Report |

Centenary Stadium, Ta' Qali
Attendance: 172
Referee: Mzevinari Sharashanidze (Georgia)

==== Group B6 ====
| Pos | Team | Pld | W | D | L | GF | GA | GD | Pts | Promotion or transfer |
|---|---|---|---|---|---|---|---|---|---|---|
| 1 | Iceland | 2 | 2 | 0 | 0 | 9 | 2 | +7 | 6 | Promoted to Round 2 League A |
| 2 | Slovenia (H) | 2 | 1 | 0 | 1 | 3 | 4 | −1 | 3 | Transferred to Round 2 League B |
| 3 | Faroe Islands | 2 | 0 | 0 | 2 | 3 | 9 | −6 | 0 | Transferred to Round 2 League B |

Source: www.sofascore.com
Rules for classification: Tiebreakers
(H) Hosts
5 November 2025
12:00

| Slovenia | 3–1 | Faroe Islands |
|---|---|---|
| Gjergjek 40', 75'; Košir 87' | Report | Benjaminsen 90+4' (pen.) |

Igrišče Terme Čatež, Čatež ob Savi
Attendance: 20
Referee: Jana Van Laere (Belgium)

8 November 2025
14:00

| Faroe Islands | 2–6 | Iceland |
|---|---|---|
| Sigurðsson 68', 76' | Report | Jónsdóttir 5', 90+1'; Káradóttir 35'; Ingibjörg 62'; Fjóla 64'; Knudsen 87' (o.g.) |

Igrišče Terme Čatež, Čatež ob Savi
Attendance: 73
Referee: Maral Mirzai Beni (Sweden)

11 November 2025
12:00

| Iceland | 3–0 | Slovenia |
|---|---|---|
| Óskarsdóttir 72'; Helgadóttir 76'; Ingibjörg 89' | Report |

Igrišče Terme Čatež, Čatež ob Savi
Attendance: 93
Referee: Elena Gobjila (Moldova)

==== Ranking of second-placed teams ====
To determine the best runner-up team, only the results of the runner-up teams against the first- and third-placed teams in their group are taken into account (Regulations Article 18.01).

| Pos | Grp | Team | Pld | W | D | L | GF | GA | GD | Pts | Promotion |
|---|---|---|---|---|---|---|---|---|---|---|---|
| 1 | B1 | Kosovo | 2 | 1 | 1 | 0 | 2 | 1 | +1 | 4 | Promoted to Round 2 League A |
| 2 | B6 | Slovenia | 2 | 1 | 0 | 1 | 3 | 4 | −1 | 3 | |
| 3 | B4 | Northern Ireland | 2 | 1 | 0 | 1 | 2 | 5 | −3 | 3 | |
| 4 | B5 | Lithuania | 2 | 1 | 0 | 1 | 3 | 10 | −7 | 3 | |
| 5 | B2 | Israel | 2 | 0 | 2 | 0 | 3 | 3 | 0 | 2 | |
| 6 | B3 | Kazakhstan | 2 | 0 | 1 | 1 | 0 | 1 | −1 | 1 | |

Source: UEFA
Rules for classification: 1) points; 2) goal difference; 3) goals scored; 4) disciplinary points; 5) position in the applicable rankings.

== Round 2 ==
=== Draw ===
The draw for the Round 2 will be held on 11 December 2025 at the UEFA headquarters in Nyon, Switzerland.

The 49 participating teams will be split into two Leagues (28 in League A, 21 in League B) according to their final group standings of Round 1 (Regulations Article 15.01).

Within each League, the teams will be allocated to four drawing pots (seven teams per pot in League A; six teams in Pots 1 to 3 and three teams in Pot 4 in League B). Teams in the same pot would be drawn into different groups, with League A consisting of seven groups of four teams, and League B consisting of three groups of four and three groups of three teams.

Teams entering League A

The 21 teams of Round 1 League A (top three teams in each group) and the seven teams of Round 1 League B (six group winners and the best runner-up) will be drawn into seven groups of four teams. The Round 1 League A group winners are automatically seeded into Pot 1, the second- and third-placed teams into Pots 2 and 3, respectively. The Round 1 League B teams are seeded into Pot 4; their matches against the fourth-placed teams in their group did not count towards this ranking (Regulations Article 15.01).

| Pos | Gr (Rk) | Team | Pld | W | D | L | GF | GA | GD | Pts | Seeding |
|---|---|---|---|---|---|---|---|---|---|---|---|
| 1 | A5 (1) | Finland | 3 | 3 | 0 | 0 | 15 | 2 | +13 | 9 | Pot 1 |
| 2 | A7 (1) | Denmark | 3 | 3 | 0 | 0 | 11 | 0 | +11 | 9 | Pot 1 |
| 3 | A1 (1) | Spain | 3 | 3 | 0 | 0 | 10 | 1 | +9 | 9 | Pot 1 |
| 4 | A4 (1) | England | 3 | 3 | 0 | 0 | 11 | 3 | +8 | 9 | Pot 1 |
| 5 | A2 (1) | France | 3 | 3 | 0 | 0 | 6 | 1 | +5 | 9 | Pot 1 |
| 6 | A3 (1) | Netherlands | 3 | 2 | 1 | 0 | 10 | 0 | +10 | 7 | Pot 1 |
| 7 | A6 (1) | Switzerland | 3 | 2 | 1 | 0 | 4 | 2 | +2 | 7 | Pot 1 |
| 8 | A3 (2) | Czech Republic | 3 | 2 | 1 | 0 | 5 | 0 | +5 | 7 | Pot 2 |
| 9 | A4 (2) | Poland | 3 | 2 | 0 | 1 | 16 | 3 | +13 | 6 | Pot 2 |
| 10 | A1 (2) | Portugal | 3 | 2 | 0 | 1 | 5 | 2 | +3 | 6 | Pot 2 |
| 11 | A2 (2) | Germany | 3 | 2 | 0 | 1 | 4 | 2 | +2 | 6 | Pot 2 |
| 12 | A5 (2) | Italy | 3 | 2 | 0 | 1 | 5 | 4 | +1 | 6 | Pot 2 |
| 13 | A6 (2) | Austria | 3 | 1 | 2 | 0 | 5 | 1 | +4 | 5 | Pot 2 |
| 14 | A7 (2) | Norway | 3 | 1 | 1 | 1 | 7 | 5 | +2 | 4 | Pot 2 |
| 15 | A1 (3) | Hungary | 3 | 1 | 0 | 2 | 6 | 3 | +3 | 3 | Pot 3 |
| 16 | A2 (3) | Republic of Ireland | 3 | 1 | 0 | 2 | 4 | 4 | 0 | 3 | Pot 3 |
| 17 | A5 (3) | Croatia | 3 | 1 | 0 | 2 | 3 | 5 | −2 | 3 | Pot 3 |
| 18 | A3 (3) | Slovakia | 3 | 1 | 0 | 2 | 3 | 8 | −5 | 3 | Pot 3 |
| 19 | A6 (3) | Romania | 3 | 0 | 2 | 1 | 2 | 3 | −1 | 2 | Pot 3 |
| 20 | A7 (3) | Serbia | 3 | 0 | 2 | 1 | 4 | 7 | −3 | 2 | Pot 3 |
| 21 | A4 (3) | Scotland | 3 | 0 | 1 | 2 | 1 | 8 | −7 | 1 | Pot 3 |
| 22 | B5 (1) | Sweden | 2 | 2 | 0 | 0 | 12 | 0 | +12 | 6 | Pot 4 |
| 23 | B6 (1) | Iceland | 2 | 2 | 0 | 0 | 9 | 2 | +7 | 6 | Pot 4 |
| 24 | B4 (1) | Turkey | 2 | 2 | 0 | 0 | 5 | 2 | +3 | 6 | Pot 4 |
| 25 | B3 (1) | Latvia | 2 | 2 | 0 | 0 | 2 | 0 | +2 | 6 | Pot 4 |
| 26 | B1 (1) | Wales | 2 | 1 | 1 | 0 | 6 | 2 | +4 | 4 | Pot 4 |
| 27 | B2 (1) | Greece | 2 | 1 | 1 | 0 | 3 | 1 | +2 | 4 | Pot 4 |
| 28 | B1 (2) | Kosovo | 2 | 1 | 1 | 0 | 2 | 1 | +1 | 4 | Pot 4 |

Source: UEFA
Rules for classification: 1) round 1 position; 2) points; 3) goal difference; 4) goals scored; 5) disciplinary points; 6) position in the applicable rankings.

Teams entering League B

The seven fourth-placed teams of Round 1 League A and the 14 non-promoted teams of Round 1 League B will be drawn into six groups of three or four teams. The best six fourth-placed teams of Round 1 League A will be automatically seeded into Pot 1. The seventh fourth-placed team of Round 1 League A and the runner-up teams of Round 1 League B will be seeded into Pot 2. The third- and fourth-placed teams of Round 1 League B will be seeded into Pots 3 and 4, respectively. The matches of the second- and third-placed teams of Round 1 League B against the fourth-placed teams in their group did not count towards this ranking (Regulations Article 15.01).

| Pos | Gr (Rk) | Team | Pld | W | D | L | GF | GA | GD | Pts | Seeding |
|---|---|---|---|---|---|---|---|---|---|---|---|
| 1 | A6 (4) | Ukraine | 3 | 0 | 1 | 2 | 1 | 6 | −5 | 1 | Pot 1 |
| 2 | A7 (4) | Belarus | 3 | 0 | 1 | 2 | 2 | 10 | −8 | 1 | Pot 1 |
| 3 | A4 (4) | Montenegro | 3 | 0 | 1 | 2 | 0 | 14 | −14 | 1 | Pot 1 |
| 4 | A2 (4) | Belgium | 3 | 0 | 0 | 3 | 2 | 9 | −7 | 0 | Pot 1 |
| 5 | A3 (4) | Andorra | 3 | 0 | 0 | 3 | 0 | 10 | −10 | 0 | Pot 1 |
| 6 | A5 (4) | North Macedonia | 3 | 0 | 0 | 3 | 0 | 12 | −12 | 0 | Pot 1 |
| 7 | A1 (4) | Bulgaria | 3 | 0 | 0 | 3 | 1 | 16 | −15 | 0 | Pot 2 |
| 8 | B4 (2) | Northern Ireland | 2 | 1 | 0 | 1 | 3 | 1 | +2 | 3 | Pot 2 |
| 9 | B6 (2) | Slovenia | 2 | 1 | 0 | 1 | 3 | 4 | −1 | 3 | Pot 2 |
| 10 | B5 (2) | Lithuania | 2 | 1 | 0 | 1 | 3 | 10 | −7 | 3 | Pot 2 |
| 11 | B2 (2) | Israel | 2 | 0 | 2 | 0 | 3 | 3 | 0 | 2 | Pot 2 |
| 12 | B3 (2) | Kazakhstan | 2 | 0 | 1 | 1 | 0 | 1 | −1 | 1 | Pot 2 |
| 13 | B3 (3) | Bosnia and Herzegovina | 2 | 0 | 1 | 1 | 0 | 1 | −1 | 1 | Pot 3 |
| 14 | B2 (3) | Albania | 2 | 0 | 1 | 1 | 2 | 4 | −2 | 1 | Pot 3 |
| 15 | B4 (3) | Luxembourg | 2 | 0 | 0 | 2 | 2 | 5 | −3 | 0 | Pot 3 |
| 16= | B5 (3) | Malta | 2 | 0 | 0 | 2 | 1 | 6 | −5 | 0 | Pot 3 |
| 16= | B1 (3) | Moldova | 2 | 0 | 0 | 2 | 1 | 6 | −5 | 0 | Pot 3 |
| 18 | B6 (3) | Faroe Islands | 2 | 0 | 0 | 2 | 3 | 9 | −6 | 0 | Pot 3 |
| 19 | B3 (4) | Georgia | 3 | 1 | 0 | 2 | 6 | 8 | −2 | 3 | Pot 4 |
| 20 | B2 (4) | Estonia | 3 | 0 | 1 | 2 | 3 | 6 | −3 | 1 | Pot 4 |
| 21 | B1 (4) | Azerbaijan | 3 | 0 | 1 | 2 | 0 | 13 | −13 | 1 | Pot 4 |

Source: UEFA
Rules for classification: 1) round 1 position; 2) points; 3) goal difference; 4) goals scored; 5) disciplinary points; 6) position in the applicable rankings.

=== League A ===
Times are CET (UTC+1) as listed by UEFA (local times, if different, are in parentheses).

==== Group A1 ====
| Pos | Team | Pld | W | D | L | GF | GA | GD | Pts | Qualification or relegation |
|---|---|---|---|---|---|---|---|---|---|---|
| 1 | Germany | 3 | 2 | 1 | 0 | 5 | 2 | +3 | 7 | Qualification for the final tournament |
| 2 | Denmark | 3 | 2 | 1 | 0 | 5 | 3 | +2 | 7 | |
| 3 | Sweden (H) | 3 | 1 | 0 | 2 | 6 | 5 | +1 | 3 | |
| 4 | Republic of Ireland | 3 | 0 | 0 | 3 | 0 | 6 | −6 | 0 | Relegation to League B for the next season's qualification |

Source: UEFA
Rules for classification: Tiebreakers
(H) Hosts
27 February 2026
13:00

| Republic of Ireland | 0–2 | Germany |
|---|---|---|
| | Report | Choisy 43'; Kleemann 81' |

Kristinebergs IP, Stockholm
Attendance: 87
Referee: Ugne Šmitaite (Lithuania)
27 February 2026
18:00

| Denmark | 3–2 | Sweden |
|---|---|---|
| Ludvigsen 18', 49'; Nielsen 37' | Report | Krasniqi 45+3'; Peterson 67' |

Kristinebergs IP, Stockholm
Attendance: 361
Referee: Audrey Gerbel (France)

2 March 2026
13:00

| Denmark | 1–0 | Republic of Ireland |
|---|---|---|
| Bischoff 42' | Report |

Kristinebergs IP, Stockholm
Attendance: 70
Referee: Elisabet Calvo Valentín (Spain)
2 March 2026
18:00

| Germany | 2–1 | Sweden |
|---|---|---|
| Kleemann 50'; Choisy 71' | Report | Peterson 23' |

Kristinebergs IP, Stockholm
Attendance: 214
Referee: Ugne Šmitaite (Lithuania)

5 March 2026
18:00

| Germany | 1–1 | Denmark |
|---|---|---|
| Kleemann 5' | Report | Bjerregaard 74' |

Hammarby IP, Stockholm
Attendance: 87
Referee: Elisabet Calvo Valentín (Spain)
5 March 2026
18:00

| Sweden | 3–0 | Republic of Ireland |
|---|---|---|
| Krasniqi 45'; Häggkvist 48'; Peterson 56' | Report |

Kristinebergs IP, Stockholm
Attendance: 202
Referee: Audrey Gerbel (France)

==== Group A2 ====
| Pos | Team | Pld | W | D | L | GF | GA | GD | Pts | Qualification or relegation |
|---|---|---|---|---|---|---|---|---|---|---|
| 1 | England | 3 | 3 | 0 | 0 | 6 | 3 | +3 | 9 | Qualification for the final tournament |
| 2 | Croatia (H) | 3 | 1 | 1 | 1 | 4 | 4 | 0 | 4 | |
| 3 | Italy | 3 | 1 | 0 | 2 | 6 | 5 | +1 | 3 | |
| 4 | Turkey | 3 | 0 | 1 | 2 | 3 | 7 | −4 | 1 | Relegation to League B for the next season's qualification |

Source: UEFA
Rules for classification: Tiebreakers
(H) Hosts
13 March 2026
12:00

| Croatia | 2–1 | Italy |
|---|---|---|
| Bubica 10'; Popić 15' | Report | Ciurleo 45+3' |

Stadion Branko Čavlović-Čavlek, Karlovac
Attendance: 100
Referee: Eirini Pingiou (Greece)
13 March 2026
14:00

| England | 2–1 | Turkey |
|---|---|---|
| Brodie 45+1'; Hirons 69' | Report | Tong 76' |

Gradski stadion, Sisak
Attendance: 30
Referee: Lena Hirtl (Austria)

16 March 2026
12:00

| England | 1–0 | Croatia |
|---|---|---|
| St Claire De Beaulac 24' | Report |

Stadion Branko Čavlović-Čavlek, Karlovac
Attendance: 80
Referee: Frederikke Lydia Søkjær (Denmark)
16 March 2026
14:00

| Italy | 3–0 | Turkey |
|---|---|---|
| Ciurleo 27'; Battocchio 55'; Guerzoni 75' (pen.) | Report |

Gradski stadion, Sisak
Attendance: 50
Referee: Eirini Pingiou (Greece)

19 March 2026
12:00

| Italy | 2–3 | England |
|---|---|---|
| Oddina 22'; Ferranti 79' | Report | Hirons 9'; Brodie 50', 62' |

Gradski stadion, Sisak
Attendance: 55
Referee: Frederikke Lydia Søkjær (Denmark)
19 March 2026
12:00

| Turkey | 2–2 | Croatia |
|---|---|---|
| Balci 74'; Gür 89' (pen.) | Report | Vujičić 37' (pen.); Pecić 53' |

Stadion Branko Čavlović-Čavlek, Karlovac
Attendance: 60
Referee: Lena Hirtl (Austria)

==== Group A3 ====
| Pos | Team | Pld | W | D | L | GF | GA | GD | Pts | Qualification or relegation |
|---|---|---|---|---|---|---|---|---|---|---|
| 1 | Finland | 3 | 2 | 1 | 0 | 11 | 1 | +10 | 7 | Qualification for the final tournament |
| 2 | Czech Republic (H) | 3 | 2 | 1 | 0 | 8 | 1 | +7 | 7 | |
| 3 | Romania | 3 | 1 | 0 | 2 | 4 | 9 | −5 | 3 | |
| 4 | Latvia | 3 | 0 | 0 | 3 | 1 | 13 | −12 | 0 | Relegation to League B for the next season's qualification |

Source: UEFA
Rules for classification: Tiebreakers
(H) Hosts
9 March 2026
11:00

| Finland | 7–0 | Latvia |
|---|---|---|
| Mandelin 6'; Oulasvirta 17', 32', 49', 58' (pen.); Ylätalo 23'; Pulkkanen 74' | Report |

FK Chmel, Blšany
Referee: Paola Cebollada López (Spain)
9 March 2026
14:00

| Romania | 0–5 | Czech Republic |
|---|---|---|
| | Report | Kynclová 45+3'; Řehová 51'; Volhejnová 69'; Pešková 77', 82' |

Letní stadion, Chomutov
Referee: Liudmyla Telbukh (Ukraine)

12 March 2026
11:00

| Finland | 3–0 | Romania |
|---|---|---|
| Oulasvirta 42'; Ylätalo 79'; Ahonen 82' | Report |

FK Chmel, Blšany
Referee: Melissa Burgin (England)
12 March 2026
14:00

| Czech Republic | 2–0 | Latvia |
|---|---|---|
| Čuntová 37'; Juřeníková 46' | Report |

Letní stadion, Chomutov
Referee: Liudmyla Telbukh (Ukraine)

15 March 2026
14:00

| Czech Republic | 1–1 | Finland |
|---|---|---|
| Řehová 27' | Report | Ylätalo 59' |

Letní stadion, Chomutov
Referee: Melissa Burgin (England)
15 March 2026
14:00

| Latvia | 1–4 | Romania |
|---|---|---|
| Haritonova 8' | Report | Candea 18', 65'; Colibaba 69'; Bucșa 90+5' (pen.) |

FK Chmel, Blšany
Referee: Paola Cebollada López (Spain)

==== Group A4 ====
| Pos | Team | Pld | W | D | L | GF | GA | GD | Pts | Qualification or relegation |
|---|---|---|---|---|---|---|---|---|---|---|
| 1 | France | 3 | 2 | 0 | 1 | 6 | 4 | +2 | 6 (Note: Ranked on head-to-head points: France 3, Austria 0.) | Qualification for the final tournament |
| 2 | Austria | 3 | 2 | 0 | 1 | 4 | 4 | 0 | 6 | |
| 3 | Iceland | 3 | 1 | 0 | 2 | 6 | 3 | +3 | 3 (Note: Ranked on head-to-head points: Iceland 3, Serbia 0.) | |
| 4 | Serbia (H) | 3 | 1 | 0 | 2 | 3 | 8 | −5 | 3 | Relegation to League B for the next season's qualification |

Source: UEFA
Rules for classification: Tiebreakers
(H) Hosts
Notes:
14 March 2026
11:00

| France | 2–1 | Iceland |
|---|---|---|
| Gorprou 45'; Zidi 90' | Report | Ísold 90+3' |

Serbian FA Sports Center, Stara Pazova
Referee: Natálie Čampišová (Czech Republic)
14 March 2026
14:00

| Serbia | 1–2 | Austria |
|---|---|---|
| Topić 70' | Report | Dike 77'; Rauscha 90+4' |

Serbian FA Sports Center, Stara Pazova
Referee: Davina Lutz (Germany)

17 March 2026
11:00

| Austria | 1–0 | Iceland |
|---|---|---|
| Rauscha 80' | Report |

Serbian FA Sports Center, Stara Pazova
Referee: Davina Lutz (Germany)
17 March 2026
14:00

| France | 1–2 | Serbia |
|---|---|---|
| Tae 5' | Report | Šipka 28', 45+1' |

Serbian FA Sports Center, Stara Pazova
Referee: Laura Mauricio (Switzerland)

20 March 2026
12:00

| Austria | 1–3 | France |
|---|---|---|
| Lampl 89' | Report | Collin 48', 69'; E. Motyka 87' |

Serbian FA Sports Center, Stara Pazova
Referee: Laura Mauricio (Switzerland)
20 March 2026
12:00

| Iceland | 5–0 | Serbia |
|---|---|---|
| Stefánsdóttir 29'; Jóhannesdóttir 39', 45+2'; Guðmundsdóttir 65'; Káradóttir 71' | Report |

Serbian FA Sports Center, Stara Pazova
Referee: Natálie Čampišová (Czech Republic)

==== Group A5 ====
| Pos | Team | Pld | W | D | L | GF | GA | GD | Pts | Qualification or relegation |
|---|---|---|---|---|---|---|---|---|---|---|
| 1 | Norway (H) | 3 | 3 | 0 | 0 | 10 | 2 | +8 | 9 | Qualification for the final tournament |
| 2 | Scotland | 3 | 2 | 0 | 1 | 6 | 4 | +2 | 6 | |
| 3 | Switzerland | 3 | 1 | 0 | 2 | 2 | 4 | −2 | 3 | |
| 4 | Greece | 3 | 0 | 0 | 3 | 1 | 9 | −8 | 0 | Relegation to League B for the next season's qualification |

Source: UEFA
Rules for classification: Tiebreakers
(H) Hosts
12 March 2026
13:00

| Scotland | 1–3 | Norway |
|---|---|---|
| Crawford 7' (pen.) | Report | Hoem 20'; Lapore 26'; Lund 29' |

Sarpsborg Stadion, Sarpsborg
Referee: Audrey Gerbel (France)
12 March 2026
18:00

| Switzerland | 1–0 | Greece |
|---|---|---|
| Steffen 27' | Report |

Sarpsborg Stadion, Sarpsborg
Referee: Senida Petak (Bosnia and Herzegovina)

15 March 2026
13:00

| Norway | 5–0 | Greece |
|---|---|---|
| Klæboe-Solemdal 13'; Kechagia 43' (o.g.); Mørch 45+1'; Blindheim 75'; Melgård 86' | Report |

Fredrikstad Stadion, Fredrikstad
Referee: Audrey Gerbel (France)
15 March 2026
18:00

| Switzerland | 0–2 | Scotland |
|---|---|---|
| | Report | Crawford 44'; I. Taylor 71' |

Fredrikstad Stadion, Fredrikstad
Referee: Roxana Recorean (Romania)

18 March 2026
13:00

| Norway | 2–1 | Switzerland |
|---|---|---|
| Hoem 34'; Berisha 43' | Report | Kamber 63' (pen.) |

Fredrikstad Stadion, Fredrikstad
Referee: Roxana Recorean (Romania)
18 March 2026
13:00

| Greece | 1–3 | Scotland |
|---|---|---|
| Velissaridou 75' (pen.) | Report | I. Taylor 11', 23'; O'Brien 68' |

Sarpsborg Stadion, Sarpsborg
Referee: Senida Petak (Bosnia and Herzegovina)

==== Group A6 ====
| Pos | Team | Pld | W | D | L | GF | GA | GD | Pts | Qualification or relegation |
|---|---|---|---|---|---|---|---|---|---|---|
| 1 | Spain | 3 | 2 | 1 | 0 | 15 | 1 | +14 | 7 | Qualification for the final tournament |
| 2 | Portugal (H) | 3 | 2 | 1 | 0 | 4 | 0 | +4 | 7 | |
| 3 | Hungary | 3 | 1 | 0 | 2 | 9 | 11 | −2 | 3 | |
| 4 | Kosovo | 3 | 0 | 0 | 3 | 3 | 19 | −16 | 0 | Relegation to League B for the next season's qualification |

Source: UEFA
Rules for classification: Tiebreakers
(H) Hosts
1 March 2026
14:00

| Spain | 8–0 | Kosovo |
|---|---|---|
| Aymerich 14'; Serrano 35'; Rius 48', 52'; Valladares 58'; Gibert 75'; Chacón 87'; Gálvez 90+4' (pen.) | Report |

Cidade do Futebol, Oeiras
Referee: Duygu Hatice Aydin (Türkiye)
1 March 2026
17:00

| Hungary | 0–1 | Portugal |
|---|---|---|
| | Report | Vitorino 90+5' |

Cidade do Futebol, Oeiras
Referee: Hanna Laajanen (Sweden)

4 March 2026
14:00

| Spain | 7–1 | Hungary |
|---|---|---|
| Cabetas 12'; Gálvez 21', 86'; Serrano 27'; Veres 41' (o.g.); Elaine 57', 89' | Report | Veres 59' |

Real Sport Clube, Queluz
Referee: Abbie Hendry (Scotland)
4 March 2026
17:00

| Portugal | 3–0 | Kosovo |
|---|---|---|
| Monteiro 12'; Branco 25'; Rodrigues 89' | Report |

Cidade do Futebol, Oeiras
Referee: Hanna Laajanen (Sweden)

7 March 2026
15:00

| Portugal | 0–0 | Spain |
|---|---|---|
| | Report |

Cidade do Futebol, Oeiras
Referee: Abbie Hendry (Scotland)
7 March 2026
15:00

| Kosovo | 3–8 | Hungary |
|---|---|---|
| Meha 14', 78'; Halili 59' | Report | Tóth 4'; Kovács 17', 54'; Pethe 20'; Farkas 22'; Veres 25', 39'; Gyurátz 73' |

Real Sport Clube, Queluz
Referee: Duygu Hatice Aydin (Türkiye)

==== Group A7 ====
| Pos | Team | Pld | W | D | L | GF | GA | GD | Pts | Qualification or relegation |
|---|---|---|---|---|---|---|---|---|---|---|
| 1 | Poland | 3 | 3 | 0 | 0 | 11 | 4 | +7 | 9 | Qualification for the final tournament |
| 2 | Netherlands | 3 | 2 | 0 | 1 | 11 | 4 | +7 | 6 | |
| 3 | Slovakia | 3 | 1 | 0 | 2 | 2 | 7 | −5 | 3 | |
| 4 | Wales (H) | 3 | 0 | 0 | 3 | 2 | 11 | −9 | 0 | Relegation to League B for the next season's qualification |

Source: UEFA
Rules for classification: Tiebreakers
(H) Hosts
11 March 2026
15:00

| Netherlands | 5–0 | Wales |
|---|---|---|
| Gelevert 24' (pen.), 30'; Rees 25' (o.g.); Deitelzweig Senior 49', 62' | Report |

Rodney Parade, Newport
Referee: Fabienne Hofer (Austria)
11 March 2026
20:00

| Slovakia | 0–3 | Poland |
|---|---|---|
| | Report | Kwiatkowska 21'; Kulka 23'; Prekopová 66' (o.g.) |

Newport Stadium, Newport
Referee: Jelena Kumer (Croatia)

14 March 2026
15:00

| Netherlands | 3–0 Awarded (Note: The Netherlands were awarded a 3–0 victory by forfeit due to illness in Slovakia's team.) | Slovakia |
|---|---|---|
| | Report |

Dragon Park, Newport
Referee: Elisabet Calvo Valentín (Spain)
14 March 2026
20:00

| Poland | 4–1 | Wales |
|---|---|---|
| Burzan 42', 58'; Zakrzewska 66'; Kulka 73' | Report | Giddings 64' |

Cardiff International Sports Campus, Cardiff
Referee: Jelena Kumer (Croatia)

17 March 2026
15:00

| Poland | 4–3 | Netherlands |
|---|---|---|
| Burzan 11'; Prochwicz 40'; Gałuszka 44', 79' | Report | Deitelzweig Senior 31'; Ros 47'; Wassink 61' |

Newport Stadium, Newport
Referee: Elisabet Calvo Valentín (Spain)
17 March 2026
20:00

| Wales | 1–2 | Slovakia |
|---|---|---|
| Griffiths 32' | Report | Zacharová 75'; Bodnárová 90+4' |

Dragon Park, Newport
Referee: Fabienne Hofer (Austria)

=== League B ===
Times are CET (UTC+1) as listed by UEFA (local times, if different, are in parentheses).

==== Group B1 ====
| Pos | Team | Pld | W | D | L | GF | GA | GD | Pts | Promotion |
|---|---|---|---|---|---|---|---|---|---|---|
| 1 | Belarus | 3 | 2 | 0 | 1 | 6 | 1 | +5 | 6 (Note: Ranked on head-to-head goal difference: Belarus +2, Malta 0, Estonia –2.) | Promotion to League A for the next season's qualification |
| 2 | Malta | 3 | 2 | 0 | 1 | 5 | 4 | +1 | 6 | |
| 3 | Estonia | 3 | 2 | 0 | 1 | 6 | 5 | +1 | 6 | |
| 4 | Lithuania | 3 | 0 | 0 | 3 | 1 | 8 | −7 | 0 | |

Source: www.sofascore.com
Rules for classification: Tiebreakers
Notes:
27 March 2026

| Belarus | 3–0 Awarded (Note: Belarus were awarded a 3–0 victory by forfeit due to Estonia's team boycotting the game due to Belarus' involvement in Russia's war against Ukraine.) | Estonia |
|---|---|---|
| | Report |

Centenary Stadium, Ta' Qali
27 March 2026
15:00

| Malta | 2–1 | Lithuania |
|---|---|---|
| Catania 17'; Borg 31' | Report | Kairytė 53' |

Centenary Stadium, Ta' Qali
Attendance: 132
Referee: Manon Plandsoen (The Netherlands)

30 March 2026
11:00

| Lithuania | 0–3 | Estonia |
|---|---|---|
| | Report | Ottas 21'; Eberg 71', 87' |

Centenary Stadium, Ta' Qali
Attendance: 19
Referee: Manon Plandsoen (The Netherlands)
30 March 2026
14:30

| Belarus | 0–1 | Malta |
|---|---|---|
| | Report | Axiak 15' |

Centenary Stadium, Ta' Qali
Attendance: 127
Referee: Melek Dakan (Türkiye)

2 April 2026

| Lithuania | 0–3 Awarded (Note: Belarus were awarded a 3–0 victory by forfeit due to Lithuania's team boycotting the game due to Belarus' involvement in Russia's war against Ukraine.) | Belarus |
|---|---|---|
| | Report |

National Stadium, Ta' Qali
2 April 2026
11:00

| Estonia | 3–2 | Malta |
|---|---|---|
| Matson 59', 63'; A. Južaninova 81' | Report | Bello Catania 12', 90+3' (pen.) |

Centenary Stadium, Ta' Qali
Attendance: 154
Referee: Ana Afo (Portugal)

==== Group B2 ====
| Pos | Team | Pld | W | D | L | GF | GA | GD | Pts | Promotion |
|---|---|---|---|---|---|---|---|---|---|---|
| 1 | Northern Ireland | 3 | 3 | 0 | 0 | 10 | 2 | +8 | 9 | Promotion to League A for the next season's qualification |
| 2 | North Macedonia (H) | 3 | 2 | 0 | 1 | 3 | 3 | 0 | 6 | |
| 3 | Georgia | 3 | 0 | 1 | 2 | 1 | 4 | −3 | 1 | |
| 4 | Luxembourg | 3 | 0 | 1 | 2 | 1 | 6 | −5 | 1 | |

Source: www.sofascore.com
Rules for classification: Tiebreakers
(H) Hosts
28 February 2026
13:00

| North Macedonia | 1–0 | Georgia |
|---|---|---|
| Naumoska 70' | Report |

Goran Pandev Training Complex, Strumica
Referee: Ioanna Allayiotou (Cyprus)
28 February 2026
13:00

| Luxembourg | 1–4 | Northern Ireland |
|---|---|---|
| Bojanovic 90+3' | Report | Stachura 40'; Leacock 55', 85'; Robinson 79' |

Stadion Kukuš, Strumica
Referee: Briet Bragadottir (Iceland)

3 March 2026
13:00

| North Macedonia | 2–0 | Luxembourg |
|---|---|---|
| Spasovska 17'; Balla 26' | Report |

Goran Pandev Training Complex, Strumica
Referee: Rita Vehapi (Kosovo)
3 March 2026
13:00

| Northern Ireland | 3–1 | Georgia |
|---|---|---|
| Smyth 6', 73'; Leacock 47' | Report | E. Bolkvadze 19' |

Stadion Kukuš, Strumica
Referee: Briet Bragadottir (Iceland)

6 March 2026
13:00

| Northern Ireland | 3–0 | North Macedonia |
|---|---|---|
| Smyth 12'; Leacock 26'; Robinson 90+4' | Report |

Goran Pandev Training Complex, Strumica
Referee: Rita Vehapi (Kosovo)
6 March 2026
13:00

| Georgia | 0–0 | Luxembourg |
|---|---|---|
| | Report |

Stadion Kukuš, Strumica
Referee: Ioanna Allayiotou (Cyprus)

==== Group B3 ====
| Pos | Team | Pld | W | D | L | GF | GA | GD | Pts | Promotion |
|---|---|---|---|---|---|---|---|---|---|---|
| 1 | Belgium | 3 | 3 | 0 | 0 | 21 | 0 | +21 | 9 | Promotion to League A for the next season's qualification |
| 2 | Faroe Islands | 3 | 2 | 0 | 1 | 10 | 7 | +3 | 6 | |
| 3 | Slovenia (H) | 3 | 1 | 0 | 2 | 3 | 8 | −5 | 3 | |
| 4 | Azerbaijan | 3 | 0 | 0 | 3 | 1 | 20 | −19 | 0 | |

Source: www.sofascore.com
Rules for classification: Tiebreakers
(H) Hosts
12 March 2026
12:00

| Belgium | 11–0 | Azerbaijan |
|---|---|---|
| Godfroid 8', 24', 61'; Dehaemers 20', 52', 56'; Van Goethem 22'; Kasongo 32'; Maerschalck 66', 86' (pen.); Louis 90+1' | Report |

Matija Gubec Stadium, Krško
Referee: Veronika Vasylchenko (Ukraine)
12 March 2026
12:00

| Faroe Islands | 4–0 | Slovenia |
|---|---|---|
| Selan 23' (o.g.); Benjaminsen 25', 75'; Sigurðsson 66' | Report |

Brežice stadium, Brežice
Referee: Oxana Cruc (Moldova)

15 March 2026
12:00

| Belgium | 6–0 | Faroe Islands |
|---|---|---|
| Hoekx 13', 42'; Maerschalck 16'; Van Buggenhout 58'; Louis 63'; Kasongo 84' | Report |

Matija Gubec Stadium, Krško
Referee: Anna Adamska (Poland)
15 March 2026
12:00

| Slovenia | 3–0 | Azerbaijan |
|---|---|---|
| Pintar 21', 51'; Pirc 67' | Report |

Brežice stadium, Brežice
Referee: Oxana Cruc (Moldova)

18 March 2026
12:00

| Slovenia | 0–4 | Belgium |
|---|---|---|
| | Report | Dehaemers 12'; Hoekx 22', 24'; Verstrepen 74' (pen.) |

Brežice stadium, Brežice
Referee: Anna Adamska (Poland)
18 March 2026
12:00

| Azerbaijan | 1–6 | Faroe Islands |
|---|---|---|
| Huseynova 42' | Report | Aliyeva 2' (o.g.); Sigurðsson 6', 77', 80', 83'; Justinussen 76' |

Matija Gubec Stadium, Krško
Referee: Veronika Vasylchenko (Ukraine)

==== Group B4 ====
| Pos | Team | Pld | W | D | L | GF | GA | GD | Pts | Promotion |
|---|---|---|---|---|---|---|---|---|---|---|
| 1 | Kazakhstan | 2 | 1 | 1 | 0 | 6 | 3 | +3 | 4 | Promotion to League A for the next season's qualification |
| 2 | Moldova | 2 | 0 | 2 | 0 | 3 | 3 | 0 | 2 | |
| 3 | Montenegro (H) | 2 | 0 | 1 | 1 | 2 | 5 | −3 | 1 | |

Source: www.sofascore.com
Rules for classification: Tiebreakers
(H) Hosts
1 April 2026
16:00

| Montenegro | 1–1 | Moldova |
|---|---|---|
| Damjanović 21' | Report | Stanciu 71' |

Stadion pod Vrmcem, Kotor
Referee: Joanna Vassallo (Malta)

4 April 2026
13:00

| Moldova | 2–2 | Kazakhstan |
|---|---|---|
| Botezatu 11'; Luca 85' | Report | Makhash 14' (pen.); Jumazhanova 40' |

Braća Velašević Stadium, Danilovgrad
Referee: Ugne Šmitaite (Lithuania)

7 April 2026
13:00

| Kazakhstan | 4–1 | Montenegro |
|---|---|---|
| Jumazhanova 38', 52'; Yagudina 40'; Tolemis 76' | Report | Luković 48' |

Braća Velašević Stadium, Danilovgrad
Referee: Duygu Hatice Aydin (Türkiye)

==== Group B5 ====
| Pos | Team | Pld | W | D | L | GF | GA | GD | Pts | Promotion |
|---|---|---|---|---|---|---|---|---|---|---|
| 1 | Ukraine | 2 | 1 | 1 | 0 | 6 | 3 | +3 | 4 | Promotion to League A for the next season's qualification |
| 2 | Bulgaria | 2 | 1 | 1 | 0 | 4 | 2 | +2 | 4 | Promotion to League A for the next season's qualification |
| 3 | Bosnia and Herzegovina (H) | 2 | 0 | 0 | 2 | 1 | 6 | −5 | 0 | |

Source: www.sofascore.com
Rules for classification: Tiebreakers
(H) Hosts
2 April 2026
14:00

| Bosnia and Herzegovina | 0–2 | Bulgaria |
|---|---|---|
| | Report | Atanasova 53'; Vasileva 60' |

Ugljevik City Stadium, Ugljevik
Referee: Ilona Birgelaite (Lithuania)

5 April 2026
14:00

| Bulgaria | 2–2 | Ukraine |
|---|---|---|
| Koeva 9'; Atanasova 13' | Report | Priadko 25'; Kozishkurt 26' |

Ugljevik City Stadium, Ugljevik
Referee: Elena Gobjila (Moldova)

8 April 2026
14:00

| Ukraine | 4–1 | Bosnia and Herzegovina |
|---|---|---|
| Bielkina 19'; Lespukh 22', 64'; Boichuk 32' | Report | Marić 24' |

Ugljevik City Stadium, Ugljevik
Referee: Asen Albayrak (Türkiye)

==== Group B6 ====
| Pos | Team | Pld | W | D | L | GF | GA | GD | Pts | Promotion |
|---|---|---|---|---|---|---|---|---|---|---|
| 1 | Israel | 2 | 1 | 1 | 0 | 1 | 0 | +1 | 4 | Promotion to League A for the next season's qualification |
| 2 | Andorra | 2 | 1 | 0 | 1 | 4 | 1 | +3 | 3 | |
| 3 | Albania (H) | 2 | 0 | 1 | 1 | 0 | 4 | −4 | 1 | |

Source: www.sofascore.com
Rules for classification: Tiebreakers
(H) Hosts
26 February 2026
14:00

| Albania | 0–4 | Andorra |
|---|---|---|
| | Report | Tesorero 25', 34'; Gelabert 45+2'; Warboys 78' |

House of Football Natural Pitch, Tirana
Referee: Wendy Gijsbers (Netherlands)

1 March 2026
12:00

| Andorra | 0–1 | Israel |
|---|---|---|
| | Report | Babajanov 8' |

House of Football Natural Pitch, Tirana
Referee: Teona Sturua (Georgia)

4 March 2026
14:00

| Israel | 0–0 | Albania |
|---|---|---|
| | Report |

House of Football Natural Pitch, Tirana
Referee: Joanna Vassallo (Malta)
