= Marius Flothuis =

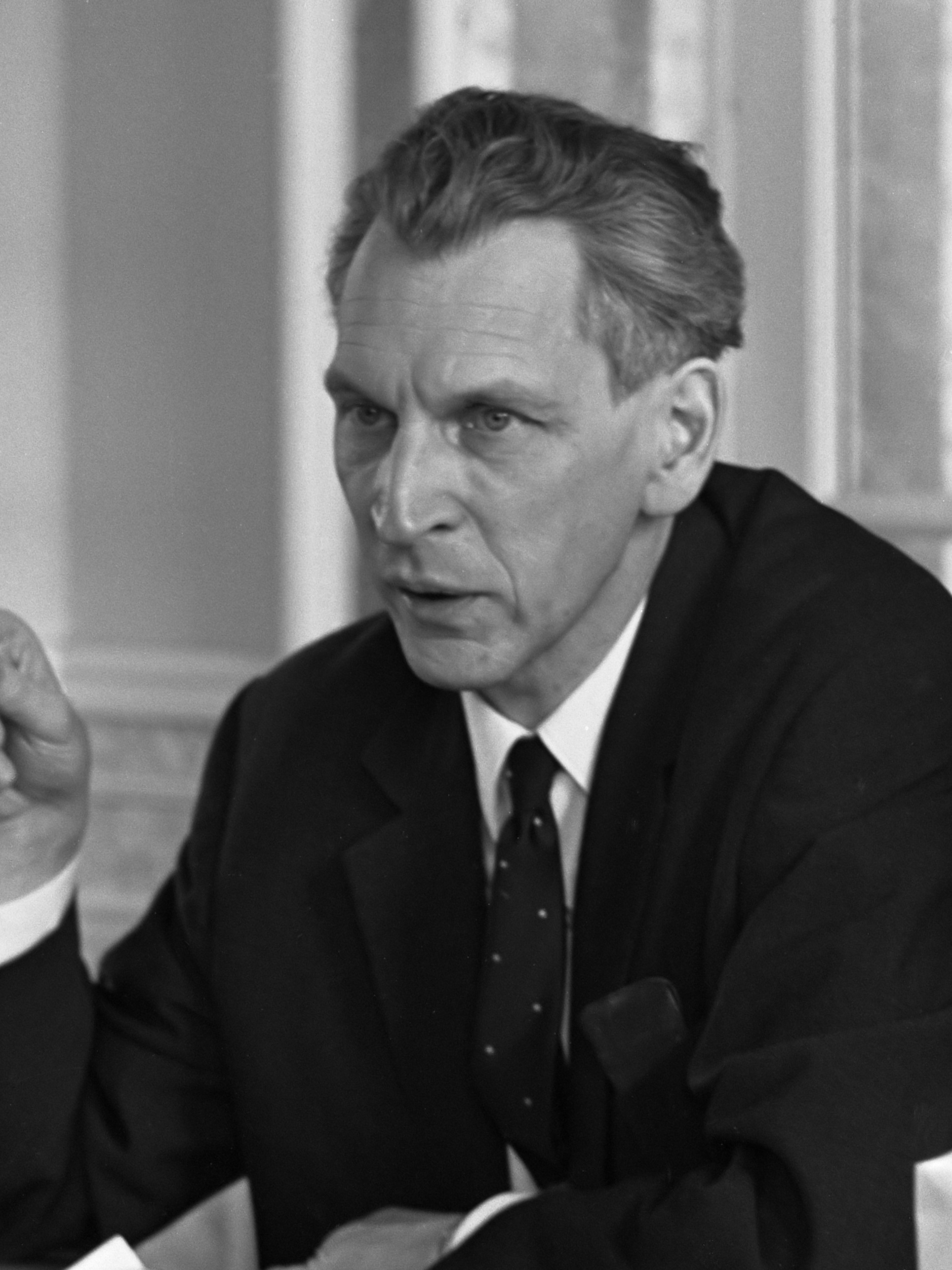
- Marius Flothuis in 1967

Background information
- Born: 30 October 1914; Amsterdam
- Died: 13 November 2001 (aged 87) Amsterdam
- Occupations: composer, musicologist, music critic
- Years active: 1930s–2000s

Marius Flothuis (30 October 1914 – 13 November 2001; born and died in Amsterdam) was a Dutch composer, musicologist and music critic.

== Biography ==
Flothuis first took courses at Vossius Gymnasium in Amsterdam. There he studied piano and music theory with Hans Brandts Buys. His musicology studies continued at the University of Amsterdam under the direction of Albert Smijers and Karel Philippus Bernet Kempers. Flothuis graduated in 1969 with a thesis on the arrangements of the works of Mozart.

In 1937, Marius Flothuis became assistant artistic director of the Concertgebouw in Amsterdam. In 1942 his career was interrupted because of his refusal to cooperate with occupying Germans. From 1946 to 1950 he was librarian at the Donemus Foundation, and was a music critic there until 1953. That year Flothuis re-joined the Concertgebouw orchestra, becoming artistic director until 1974.

Marius Flothuis was also professor of musicology at the Utrecht University from 1974 to 1983. His international reputation was then based on his studies devoted to Mozart. From 1980 to 1994, he was president of Zentral Institut für Mozart-Forschung in Salzburg. He was considered an authority in the field of Mozart music, which led him to write cadenzas for some of the composer's concertos.

== Career as composer ==
As a composer, Flothuis remained largely self-taught. He first composed in a relatively conservative language. It was only in the 1960s that he broke away from this style and followed his personal intuition.

Flothuis' catalogue contains more than a hundred opus numbers.

Flothuis recognised his marked preference for French composers like Debussy and Ravel. His compositions, in almost all genres, have little to do with the turbulence of contemporary classical music. His music conveys rather subtle and concisely expressed universal values, attuned to a classical balance.

Until the end of his life, Flothuis took an active part in Dutch musical life.

== Compositions ==
=== Orchestral ===
- 1939–1940 Concertino, pour flûte, hautbois, clarinette, saxophone, trompette, timbales, piano et cordes, opus 8
  1. Allegro aperto
  2. Allegretto con moto (alla viennese)
  3. Lento
  4. Andante amoroso con moto
  5. Allegretto con moto e leggiero
  6. Poco sostenuto-Vivace-Poco sostenuto
  7. Allegro vivace
- 1944 Concert for flute and orchestra, opus 19
  1. Introduzione-Tango e Walzer-Coda
  2. Rondo
  3. Variazioni
- 1945 Concerto, pour cor principal et petit orchestre, opus 24
  1. Assez animé
  2. Grave et très soutenu
  3. Vif et alerte
- 1946 Valses sentimentales, (orchestral version), opus 21
- 1946–1948 Concert, for piano and small orchestra, opus 30
  1. Allegretto piacevole
  2. Larghetto
  3. Molto vivace
- 1949 Capriccio, for string orchestra, opus 35 no. 2
- 1951 Concert, for violin and small orchestra, opus 39
  1. Moderato
  2. Vivace
  3. Adagio
- 1952 Slaet opten trommele, film music for small orchestra, opus 45
- 1953 Fantasia per arpa e piccola orchestra, opus 51
- 1954–1955 Sinfonietta concertante, for clarinet (in A), alto saxophone (in Es) and small orchestra, opus 55
- 1955 Concert-ouverture, opus 56
- 1956 Rondo festoso, for orchestra, opus 57
- 1957 Concert, for clarinet and orchestra, opus 58
  1. Andante con moto-Allegro-Andante con moto
  2. Allegretto leggiero-Lento-Allegretto leggiero
- 1957 Symfonische muziek, for full orchestra, opus 59
  1. Allegro
  2. Adagio molto espressivo, un poco strascinante
  3. Allegro agitato
  4. Andante maestoso
- 1962 Spes patriae, sinfonietta for small symphony orchestra, opus 62
  1. Allegro con spirito
  2. Passacaglia con intermezzi (Andante tranquillo)
  3. Allegro vivace e impetuoso
- 1963 Espressioni cordiali, sei bagattelle per orchestra a corde, opus 63
- 1964 Celdroom, radiophonic scene for speaking voice, mixed choir and orchestra, opus 65 – text: Henk van Randwijk
- 1964 Canti e giuochi, per flauto, oboe, clarinetto, fagotto, corno, orchestra a corde
- 1968 Concertino, per oboe e piccola orchestra, opus 70b
- 1971 Per sonare ed ascoltare, cinque canzoni per flauto ed orchestra, opus 73
  1. Chiaro e maestoso
  2. Vivace
  3. Adagio ma non troppo
  4. Allegretto leggiero
  5. Finale retrospettivo
- 1977–1978 Five minute pieces for orchestra, contemporary music of the Netherlands
- 1979 Cantus amoris, for strings, opus 78
- 1981 Frivolités, three pieces for strings, opus 81
- 1993 Poème, pour harpe et petit orchestre, opus 96

=== Work for concert band and fanfare orchestra ===
- 1949 Capriccio, for concert band, opus 35 nr. 1

=== Cantatas ===
- 1946 Cantata Silesiana, for three-part female choir, flute, string quartet and harpsichord, opus 29 – tekst: Angelus Silesius
- 1948–1949 Love and strife, a serious cantata for contralto, flute, oboe d'amore (also oboe), viola and 'cello, opus 34 – words by Kathleen Raine
  1. Mourning in spring 1943
  2. Sorrow
  3. Heroes
  4. Interlude
  5. Venus
  6. The moment
  7. Winged eros
- 1951 Een Amsterdamsch lied, cantata for soprano and baritone solo, flute, clarinet, two violins, viola, violoncello, double bass and piano, opus 40 – text: Jan Campert
- 1968 Fantasia quasi una cantata, for 12 strings, harpsichord and mezzo-soprano, opus 71 – text: Andri Peer
- 1985–1986 Santa Espina, pour mezzo-soprano et orchestre, on themes from La Santa Espina by Enrice Morera i Viura, opus 88 – text: Louis Aragon

=== Works for choir ===
- 1944 Bicinia, for two-part female choir with or without accompaniment (2 violins, oboe and viola, 2 flutes, 2 althobos, 2 clarinets or other combinations), opus 20
- 1933/1949 Het lied van 't dagelijks brood, for mixed choir, opus 36 no.2 – text: Bruno Schönlank
- 1951 Vier antieke fragmenten, for a cappella mixed choir, opus 41
  1. Voorzang – text: Terpander
  2. Avondlied – text: Alkman
  3. Spreuk – text: Simonides
  4. Danslied – text: Alkman
- 1952 Lente, for a cappella male choir, opus 36 nr. 3
- 1953 Round, for eight-part mixed choir, opus 50 – text: Orlando Gibbons
- 1960 Seizoenen a cycle for four-part female choir and flute, opus 61
- 1976 Een lied voor Helene, for mixed choir
- 1980 Music for USC, five pieces for a cappella choir, opus 79
  1. Love is anterior to life – text: Emily Dickinson
  2. Central Park at dusk – text: Sara Teasdale
  3. Forgetfulness – text: Hart Crane
  4. Vagabonds – text: Langston Hughes
  5. Dark summer – text: Louise Bogan
- 1985 Herinnering, two songs for mixed choir a capella, opus 93 – text: Clara Eggink and Bertus Aafjes

=== Vocal music with orchestra or instruments ===
- 1937–1938 Vier Morgenstern liederen, for soprano and piano (or orchestra), opus 3 – text: Christian Morgenstern
  1. Der Morgen war von Dir erfüllt
  2. Es ist Nacht
  3. O, Nacht
  4. Wasserfall bei Nacht
- 1939–1940 Sonnet, for mezzo-soprano and orchestra, opus 9 – text: Ernst Toller
- 1940–1945 Twee sonnetten, for mezzo-soprano or baritone and piano, opus 10
  1. Hy droech onse smerten – text: Jacobus Revius
  2. Rebel, mijn hart – text: Jan Campert
- 1942 Kleine ouverture, for soprano and orchestra, opus 14 – text: Christian Morgenstern
- 1943 Vorfrühling, for mezzo-soprano and orchestra, opus 15
  1. Die blätterlosen Pappeln stehn so fein – text: Christian Morgenstern
  2. Es läuft der Frühlingswind durch kahle Alleen – text: Hugo von Hofmannsthal
  3. Härte schwand – text: Rainer Maria Rilke
- 1945–1947 Tricinia, for tenor, baritone, and bass, opus 25
- 1947–1948 To an old love, for mezzo-soprano and orchestra, opus 32 – tekst: Ellen Marsh
- 1948–1950 Four trifles, for high voice and small orchestra, opus 33
- 1949–1951 Zes Nederlandse volksliederen – Serie I, for two voices, opus 43
- 1951 Zes Nederlandse minneliederen – Serie III, for voice and two instruments, opus 43
- 1952 Kleine suite (vocalises), for soprano and orchestra, opus 47
  1. Maestoso
  2. Con grazia, non-troppo vivo
  3. Molto tranquillo
  4. Vivace e leggiero
  5. Lento grazioso
- 1952/1995 Kleine suite (vocalises), for soprano, flute, violin, viola, violoncello and harp, opus 47a
- 1953 Negro lament, for contralt, alto saxophone and piano, opus 49 – text: Langston Hughes
  1. Proem
  2. Harlem night song
  3. Troubled woman
  4. The white ones
  5. Roland Hayes beaten (Georgia: 1942)
  6. Epilogue
- 1958–1960 Odysseus and Nausikaa, madrigal for soprano, alto, tenor, baritone and harp, opus 60 – text by Homer in translation by E.V. Rieu and fragments of Alkman and Sappho
- 1965 Hymnus, for soprano and large orchestra, opus 67 – tekst: Ingeborg Bachmann, "An die Sonne"
- 1978 Hommage à Mallarmé, for voice, flute, cello and piano, opus 80 – text: Stéphane Mallarmé
- 1983 Vrijheid, for mixed choir, 2 reciters, mezzo-soprano, flute and string orchestra, opus 83
  1. Introitus
  2. Koor
  3. Canon
  4. Lied
  5. Koraal en Arioso
  6. Lied (herhaling)
  7. Intermezzo
  8. Finale en coda
- 1988 November, three songs based on German poems for mezzo-soprano and piano, opus 90
- 1992 ... ein fremdes Völkchen ..., Poems set by Rose Ausländer for four female voices (2 sopranos and 2 altos), Opus 95
- 1996 Drei Lieder nach Gedichten von Günter Eich, for mezzo-soprano and piano, opus 99
  1. Wie grau es auch regnet
  2. Die Totentrompete
  3. Die Häherfeder
- 1996–1997 Drei Lieder nach Gedichten von Günter Eich, version for mezzo-soprano and small ensemble, opus 99a
- 1997 Adagio, für Streichorchester und Sprecherin, Opus 100 – text: Sophie Scholl
- 2001 Saraband, for mezzo-soprano and harp, opus 103

=== Chamber music ===
- 1937 Sonate, for violoncello solo, opus 2
  1. Andante
  2. Allegro
  3. Adagio
- 1939 Muziek bij Het drijvende eiland, for flute, two clarinets, trumpet, percussion, violin, double bass and piano, opus 5
- 1942 Quintet, for flute, oboe, clarinet, bassoon and bass clarinet, opus 13
- 1944 Aria, for trumpet and piano, opus 18
- 1944 Aubade, for flute, opus 19a
- 1944 Duettino pastorale, for two violins, opus 23 no. 2
- 1945 Ronde champêtre, for flute and harpsichord, opus 19b
- 1945 Sonatine, for trumpet, horn and trombone, opus 26
- 1945 Trois pièces, for two horns, opus 24a
- 1946 Vier bagatellen, for violin and piano, opus 23
- 1950 Partita, for violin and piano, opus 38 no. 1
- 1950–1951 Trio serio, for viola, violoncello and piano, opus 38 no. 2
- 1951 Sonata da camera, for flute and harp, opus 42
- 1951 Zes canonische inventies – Serie II, for 2 recorders, opus 43
- 1952 Divertimento, for clarinet, bassoon, horn, violin, viola and double bass, opus 46
  1. Entrata
  2. Scherzo 1
  3. Canzone
  4. Scherzo 2
  5. Rondo
  6. Congedo
- 1952 Kwartet, for two violins, viola and cello, opus 44
  1. Allegro impetuoso
  2. Lento
  3. Allegro appassionato
  4. Allegretto leggiero
  5. Finale (Poco adagio)
- 1961 Cantilena e ritmi, for alto recorder and harpsichord, opus 48 no. 2
- 1963 Quattro invenzioni, for four horns, opus 64
- 1967 Concertino, for oboe, violin, viola and cello, opus 70a
- 1975 Sonata, for flute, alto flute (in G), opus 76 nr. 2
- 1978 Canzone, for 2 clarinets, basset horn and bass clarinet, opus 76 nr. 4
- 1978 Pastorale, for pan flute, opus 76 nr. 6
- 1979 Piccola fantasia, for flute, opus 76 nr. 7
- 1983–1984 Trois nocturnes, for cello and harp, opus 84
- 1985 Sonate, for oboe, horn and harpsichord, opus 85
- 1985–1986 Capriccio, for soprano, alto, tenor, and baritone saxophones, opus 86
- 1986 Preludio e fughetta, for three trumpets in C, opus 76 nr. 8
- 1987 Adagio, for violin and piano, opus 89
- 1989 Preludio, notturno e capriccio, for violin, viola and cello, opus 91
- 1990 Impromptu for solo viola
- 1991–1992 Quartetto II (Fantasia), for string quartet, opus 94
- 1994–1995 Quintette, for flute, violin, viola, cello and harp, opus 97
- 1996 Duetto per due violini, opus 98

=== Work for organ ===
- 1979 Eine alte Geschichte

=== Works for piano ===
- 1934 Scherzino, opus 0
- 1935–1936 10 eenvoudige klavierstukken, opus 1
- 1937–1938 Suite voor piano
- 1944 Valses sentimentales, for piano four hands, opus 21
- 1945 Oost West, thuis best, opus 27
- 1947 Six moments musicaux, opus 31
- 1954 Valses nobles, for piano four hands, opus 52
- 1964 "Cadenzas for the Concertos in C major K.467 and in C major, K.503 by W.A. Mozart"
- 1964 "Cadenzas for the Concertos in E flat major K.482 and in D major, K.537 by W.A. Mozart"
- 1969–1970 Fünf Epigramme und ein Capriccio, for piano solo, opus 72
- 1989–1990 Paesaggi, (Paysages – Landschaften) una fantasia per pianoforte, opus 92

=== Work for harpsichord ===
- 1953 Suite, for harpsichord
  1. Toccata
  2. Intermezzo I
  3. Passacaglia
  4. Intermezzo II (Canon)
  5. Fuga

=== Works for harp(s) ===
- 1950 Pour le tombeau d'Orphée, danse élégiaque pour harpe seule
- 1951 Kleine suite, for twelf harps (in cooperation with Lex van Delden)
  1. Prelude
  2. Allegro
  3. Valse lente
  4. Fughetta
  5. Finale
- 1963 Berceuse brève, for harp, opus 75 nr. 1
- 1969 Allegro vivace, for two harps, opus 75 no. 2
- 1975 Molto lento, for harp, opus 75 no. 3
- 1978 Allegro, con precisione, for harp solo, opus 75 nr. 4
- 1984/1994 Allegro fugato, for three harps, opus 75 nr. 5
- 1985–1986 Six easy studies for harp, opus 87
- 1986 Sonorités opposées, for harp solo, opus 75 no. 6
- 1999 Rapsodie, for harp solo, opus 102

=== Work for guitar ===
- 1944 Twee stukken voor gitaar, opus 22
  1. Folia
  2. Habanera

=== Work for percussion ===
- 1975/1998 Adagio, for percussion instruments and piano (four hands), opus 74

== Publications (selection) ==
- Mozart. Den Haag 1940.
- Hedendaagse Engelse componisten. Amsterdam 1949.
- Pianomuziek. Bilthoven 1959.
- Mozarts Bearbeitungen eigener und fremder Werke. Amsterdam 1969 (PhD thesis)
- Notes on notes: selected essays. Buren 1974.
- 'Mahler interpretiert Mahler', in: Nachrichten zur Mahler-Forschung, 9, September 1981.
- 75 jaar GeNeCo: de geschiedenis van het Nederlands Genootschap van Componisten. Amstelveen 1988.
- Denken over muziek, een bundel eerder verschenen artikelen. Kampen 1993.
- ... exprimer l'inexprimable ..., essai sur la mélodie française depuis Duparc. Amsterdam 1996.
- Mozarts Klavierkonzerte – Ein musikalischer Werkführer, München 1998. ISBN 3406418740
- Mozarts Streichquartette – Ein musikalischer Werkführer, München 1998. ISBN 3406433065
- 'Autograph – Abschrift – Erstdruck. Eine kritische Bewertung', in: Mozart-Jahrbuch 2001. Kassel 2003.

== Sources ==
- Forbidden Music regained, Flothuis
- Marius Flothuis · dbnl
- Jaarboek van de Maatschappij der Nederlandse Letterkunde, 2003 · dbnl
- Leo Smit Foundation
- Donemus Webwinkel — Flothuis, Marius
- Muziekencyclopedie – Marius Flothuis
- Beynon, Emily: ‘An Introduction to Marius Flothuis (1914-2001)’, in: The New York Flute Club Newsletter, January 2021, p. 4-5, p. 7 https://www.nyfluteclub.org/uploads/newsletters/2020-2021/21-January-NYFC-Newsletter-final-low.pdf
- Beynon, Emily: Flot! The Life and Music of Marius Flothuis, on YouTube
