= Scotland women's national under-17 football team =

National association football team

Scotland Women's U-17
- Association: Scottish Football Association
- Confederation: UEFA (Europe)
- Head coach: Michael Tuohy
- FIFA code: SCO
First colours	Second colours

First international
- Scotland 6–0 Northern Ireland (Frauenfeld, Switzerland; 20 October 2007)

Biggest win
- Scotland 13–0 Lithuania (Vilnius, Lithuania; 07 October 2009)

Biggest defeat
- Norway 6–0 Scotland (Gjesdal, Norway; 3 March 2018); Scotland 0–6 France (Dax, France; 22 October 2007)

The Scotland women's national under-17 football team, also known as Scotland under-17s or Scotland U17(s), represents Scotland in association football at an under-17 age level and is controlled by the Scottish Football Association, the governing body for football in Scotland.

The team qualified for the 2014 UEFA Women's Under-17 Championship in England following a 2–0 defeat of Finland in the qualifying stage held in Hungary in October 2013. For the European tournament, to be played in November and December 2013, they were drawn in Group B with Germany, Spain and France.

== UEFA Women's Under-17 Championship ==
Year	Result	GP	W	D	L	GF	GA
(Switzerland) 2008	did not qualify						
(Switzerland) 2009	did not qualify						
(Switzerland) 2010	did not qualify						
(Switzerland) 2011	did not qualify						
(Switzerland) 2012	did not qualify						
(Switzerland) 2013	did not qualify						
(England) 2014	Group stage	3	0	1	2	2	5
(Iceland) 2015	did not qualify						
(Belarus) 2016	did not qualify						
(Czech Republic) 2017	did not qualify						
(Lithuania) 2018	did not qualify						
(Bulgaria) 2019	did not qualify						
(Sweden) ~~2020~~	Cancelled						
(Faroe Islands) ~~2021~~	Cancelled						
(Bosnia and Herzegovina) 2022	did not qualify						
(Estonia) 2023	did not qualify						
(Sweden) 2024	did not qualify						
(Faroe Islands) 2025	did not qualify						
(Northern Ireland) 2026	To be determined						
(Finland) 2027	To be determined						
(Belgium) 2028	To be determined						
(Turkey) 2029	To be determined						
Total	1/16	3	0	1	2	2	5

== Current Squad ==
The following players were named in the squad for three qualifying fixtures as part of the second round of the 2026 Euro Qualifiers for the 2026 Women's Under-17 Euros.
Head Coach: Michael Tuohy

No.	Pos.	Player	Date of birth (age)	Club
12	GK	Erin Anderson	31 January 2010 (age 16)	(Scottish Football Association) Heart of Midlothian
1	GK	Julia Gorska	13 December 2010 (age 15)	(Scottish Football Association) Motherwell
4	DF	Chloe Arrufat Wood	16 April 2009 (age 17)	(Royal Spanish Football Federation) Espanyol
6	DF	Lily Boyce	3 January 2009 (age 17)	(Scottish Football Association) Rangers
3	DF	Orla Burn	20 August 2009 (age 17)	(Scottish Football Association) Heart of Midlothian
2	DF	Toni Campbell	13 May 2010 (age 16)	(Scottish Football Association) Heart of Midlothian
13	DF	Lexie Kelly Fellows	20 July 2010 (age 16)	(Scottish Football Association) Rangers
15	DF	Eilidh McCormack	7 June 2010 (age 16)	(Scottish Football Association) Hibernian
20	DF	Freya McIndoe	10 June 2010 (age 16)	(Scottish Football Association) Celtic
5	DF	Isla Miller	29 May 2010 (age 16)	(Scottish Football Association) Rangers
14	MF	Saoirse Coyle Morrow	24 March 2010 (age 16)	(Scottish Football Association) Rangers
10	MF	Ava Crawford	26 August 2009 (age 17)	(Scottish Football Association) Spartans (loan)
18	MF	Adian Ibrahim	22 July 2009 (age 17)	(Scottish Football Association) Heart of Midlothian
7	MF	Phoebe O'Donnell	12 April 2010 (age 16)	(Scottish Football Association) Rangers
8	MF	Jessica Ramsay	14 April 2009 (age 17)	(Scottish Football Association) Hibernian
16	MF	Fearne Smith	27 May 2010 (age 16)	(Scottish Football Association) Rangers
19	MF	Isla Taylor	24 November 2009 (age 16)	(Scottish Football Association) Partick Thistle (loan)
19	FW	Lucy Jane "LJ" Hope	22 February 2009 (age 17)	(Scottish Football Association) Heart of Midlothian
11	FW	Erin O'Brien	22 February 2009 (age 17)	(Scottish Football Association) Rangers
9	FW	Oluwadara Ositelu	11 February 2009 (age 17)	(Scottish Football Association) Glasgow City F.C.

=== Previous Call-Ups ===
Pos.	Player	Date of birth (age)	Caps	Goals	Club	Latest call-up
DF	Neve Fisher		-	-	(England) Sheffield United	
MF	Mirren Duncan		-	-	(Scotland) Celtic	
MF	Isla Gourley		-	-	(Scotland) Hibernian	
FW	Lily McLaughlin		-	-	(Scotland) Celtic	

== Recent Schedule & Results ==
This list includes match results from the past 12 months, as well as any future matches that have been scheduled.

== Managerial History ==
Years active	Coach Name
2017 - 2024	Pauline MacDonald
2024 -	Michael Tuohy
