= Rachael Adedini =

French footballer (born 2009)

Personal information
- Full name: Rachael Adesola Adeola Adedini
- Date of birth: 20 June 2009 (age 17)
- Place of birth: Le Havre, France
- Height: 5 ft 10 in (1.77 m)
- Position: Forward

Team information
- Current team: Chelsea
- Number: 31

Youth career
- 2018–2021: FCM Ingré
- 2021–2022: Orléans
- 2022–2024: Manchester United
- 2024–2026: Manchester City

Senior career*
Years	Team	Apps	(Gls)
2026–	Chelsea	0	(0)

International career^{‡}
2024–	France U17	21	(11)
2025	France U18	6	(1)
2026–	France U19	6	(0)
Medal record
Women's football
Representing France
UEFA Women's Under-17 Championship
Runner-up	2026 Northern Ireland
- * Club domestic league appearances and goals ‡ National team caps and goals as of 14:59, 20 October 2026 (UTC)

Rachael Adesola Adeola Adedini (born 20 June 2009) is a French professional footballer who plays as a forward for Women's Super League side Chelsea and the France women's national under-19 team.

== Early life ==
Rachael Adesola Adeola Adedini was born on 20 June 2009 in Le Havre, France. She is of Nigerian descent through her parents. She has a brother.

== Club career ==
As a youth player, Adedini joined the academy of French side CM Ingré. Following her stint there, she joined the youth academy of French side Orléans in 2021.

Subsequently, she joined the youth academy of English side Manchester United in 2022. In 2024, she joined the youth academy of rival side Manchester City.

On 20 October 2026, Adedini signed her first professional contract with Chelsea.

== International career ==
Adedini is a France youth international. During May 2024, she played for the France under-17 team at the 2024 UEFA Women's Under-17 Championship. Adedini was the top scorer at the 2026 Under-17 Euro, and was named to the competition's Team of the Tournament. Having scored nine goals across her three Under-17 Euro competitions, she equalled the all-time record set by Shekiera Martinez.

== Honours ==
France U17

- UEFA Women's Under-17 Championship runner-up: 2026

Individual

- UEFA Women's Under-17 Championship top scorer: 2026
- UEFA Women's Under-17 Championship Team of the Tournament: 2026
