= England women's national under-17 football team =

National association football team

England Women's U-17
- Nickname: The Young Lionesses
- Association: The Football Association
- Confederation: UEFA (Europe)
- Head coach: Kerri Welsh
- FIFA code: ENG
First colours	Second colours

First international
- England 13–0 Georgia (Tbilisi, Georgia; 27 October 2007)

Biggest win
- England 14–0 Lithuania (Kaunas, Lithuania; 24 October 2016)

Biggest defeat
- Germany 8–0 England (Alytus, Lithuania; 18 May 2018)

UEFA Women's Under-17 Championship
- Appearances: 9 (first in 2008)
- Best result: Runners-up (2024)

FIFA U-17 Women's World Cup
- Appearances: 3 (first in 2008)
- Best result: Fourth place (2008, 2024)

The England women's national under-17 football team, also known as the Young Lionesses, represents England in association football at an under-17 age level and is controlled by the Football Association, the governing body for football in England. England women's national under-17 football team best achievement is a runners-up finish at the 2024 UEFA Women's Under-17 Championship.

== FIFA U-17 Women's World Cup ==
The team has competed at three FIFA U-17 Women's World Cup tournaments.

Year	Result	Pld	W	D*	L	GF	GA	Squad
(New Zealand) 2008	Fourth place	6	2	1	3	7	10	Squad
(Trinidad and Tobago) 2010	Did not qualify							
(Azerbaijan) 2012	Did not qualify							
(Costa Rica) 2014	Did not qualify							
(Jordan) 2016	Quarter-finals	4	1	2	1	5	7	Squad
(Uruguay) 2018	Did not qualify							
(India) 2022	Did not qualify							
(Dominican Republic) 2024	Fourth place	6	2	1	3	8	14	Squad
(Morocco) 2025	Did not qualify							
(Morocco) 2026	Did not qualify							
(Morocco) 2027	To be determined							
(Morocco) 2028	To be determined							
(Morocco) 2029	To be determined							
Total	3/13	16	5	4	7	20	31	–

* Draws include knockout matches decided by penalty shoot-out.

== UEFA Women's Under-17 Championship ==
The team has participated in nine UEFA Women's Under-17 Championship tournaments.

Year	Result	GP	W	D*	L	GF	GA
(Switzerland) 2008	Fourth place	2	0	0	2	2	7
(Switzerland) 2009	Did not qualify						
(Switzerland) 2010	Did not qualify						
(Switzerland) 2011	Did not qualify						
(Switzerland) 2012	Did not qualify						
(Switzerland) 2013	Did not qualify						
(England) 2014	Fourth place	5	2	1	2	8	6
(Iceland) 2015	Group stage	3	1	1	1	4	7
(Belarus) 2016	Third place	5	4	0	1	24	8
(Czech Republic) 2017	Group stage	3	1	0	2	6	4
(Lithuania) 2018	Fourth place	5	1	1	3	8	14
(Bulgaria) 2019	Group stage	3	2	0	1	4	5
(Sweden) ~~2020~~	Cancelled due to the COVID-19 pandemic						
(Faroe Islands) ~~2021~~	Cancelled due to the COVID-19 pandemic						
(Bosnia and Herzegovina) 2022	Did not qualify						
(Estonia) 2023	Semi-finals	4	2	1	1	7	6
(Sweden) 2024	Runners-up	5	4	0	1	11	5
(Faroe Islands) 2025	Did not qualify						
(Northern Ireland) 2026	Group stage	4	1	1	2	3	4
(Finland) 2027	To be determined						
(Belgium) 2028	To be determined						
(Turkey) 2029	To be determined						
Total:10/17	Runners-up	39	18	5	16	77	66

*Draws include knockout matches decided by penalty shoot-outs.
**Red border colour denotes tournament was held on home soil.

== Current squad ==
On 7 September 2026, Kerri Welsh named a 24-player squad for two matches against Finland.
Head coach: Kerri Welsh

No.	Pos.	Player	Date of birth (age)	Club
	GK	Hannah Kirk		(The Football Association) Leicester City
	GK	Billie Price		(The Football Association) Brighton & Hove Albion
	GK	Victoria Rudz	10 September 2010 (age 16)	(The Football Association) Chelsea
	DF	Annie-Joy Boichat		(The Football Association) Chelsea
	DF	Ella-Rose Boothe		(The Football Association) Chelsea
	DF	Amie Bush		(The Football Association) Tottenham Hotspur
	DF	Zoe Ciccardini	29 January 2010 (age 16)	(The Football Association) Chelsea
	DF	Isabella Eborall		(The Football Association) Aston Villa
	DF	Sophie Leach		(The Football Association) Chelsea
	DF	Neeve McDonald		(The Football Association) Bristol City
	DF	Amarachukwu Nwankwo	22 July 2010 (age 16)	(The Football Association) Manchester City
	MF	Izzie Breen		(The Football Association) Liverpool City
	MF	Betty Fisher		(The Football Association) Chelsea
	MF	Maria Mayers		(The Football Association) Chelsea
	MF	Stevie Sinclair		(The Football Association) Chelsea
	MF	Naile Yemeru		(The Football Association) Manchester City
	FW	Macy Bangura		(The Football Association) Manchester City
	FW	Angelina Joy Bramble		(The Football Association) Arsenal
	FW	Mia Dixon		(The Football Association) Arsenal
	FW	Ayomide Junaid		(Portuguese Football Federation) Benfica Residential Acaedemy
	FW	Aysia Matabaro		(The Football Association) Chelsea
	FW	Chidimma Nwokedi		(The Football Association) Chelsea
	FW	Jahmya Putman		(The Football Association) Chelsea
	FW	Isabelle Ranger		(The Football Association) Brighton & Hove Albion
TRN = Training player

=== Recent callups ===
The following players have also been called up to the England U17 squad within the last twelve months.

This list may be incomplete.

Pos.	Player	Date of birth (age)	Caps	Goals	Club	Latest call-up
GK	Erin Walker	23 June 2009 (age 17)	-	-	(England) Manchester City	2026 Euro Qualifiers
DF	Maisie Brickell	13 November 2009 (age 16)	-	-	(England) Chelsea	2026 Euro Qualifiers
DF	Emilie Gay	8 February 2009 (age 17)	-	-	(England) Brighton & Hove Albion	2026 Euro Qualifiers
DF	Niobe Mellor-Antill	14 September 2009 (age 17)	-	-	(England) Manchester City	2026 Euro Qualifiers
DF	Lottie Day	15 September 2009 (age 17)	-	-	(England) Sheffield United	v. Norway, 12 February 2026
DF	Lucy Robinson	26 November 2008 (age 17)	-	-	(England) Manchester United	2026 Euro Qualifiers
DF	Katie Scott	24 September 2009 (age 17)	-	-	(England) Aston Villa	2026 Euro Qualifiers
DF	Isabella Cowley	20 August 2009 (age 17)	-	-	(England) Arsenal	2026 Euro Qualifiers
DF	Sadie Gregory	28 November 2009 (age 16)	-	-	(England) Chelsea	2026 Euro Qualifiers
DF	Isla Law	12 February 2009 (age 17)	-	-	(England) Bristol City	2026 Euro Qualifiers
MF	Bryony Brodie	28 May 2009 (age 17)	-	-	(England) Arsenal	2026 Euro Qualifiers
MF	Romia Gagliano	24 August 2009 (age 17)	-	-	(Switzerland) FC Basel	2026 Euro Qualifiers
MF	Annabelle Tang	1 November 2009 (age 17)	-	-	(England) Arsenal	2026 Euro Qualifiers
MF	Maizie Trueman		-	-	(England) Liverpool	v. Norway, 12 February 2026
MF	Kyri Teer-Hutchins	30 March 2009 (age 17)	-	-	(England) Arsenal	2026 Euro Qualifiers
MF	Pixie Bradley		-	-	(England) Manchester United	v. Norway, 12 February 2026
FW	Cairo Antoine	21 June 2009 (age 17)	-	-	(England) Arsenal	2026 Euro Qualifiers
FW	Sophia Burton	15 April 2009 (age 17)	-	-	(England) Manchester City	2026 Euro Qualifiers
FW	Alexandra De Beaulac	25 July 2009 (age 17)	-	-	(England) Players Development Academy	2026 Euro Qualifiers
FW	Ella Carr	13 March 2010 (age 16)	-	-	(United States) Austin Sting Soccer	2026 Euro Qualifiers
FW	Mia Dixon	31 January 2010 (age 16)	-	-	(England) Arsenal	2026 Euro Qualifiers
FW	Freya Hirons	31 July 2009 (age 17)	-	-	(England) Manchester City	2026 Euro Qualifiers
FW	Abbie Jones	2 June 2009 (age 17)	-	-	(England) Sheffield United	2026 Euro Qualifiers
FW	Aysia Matabaro	30 September 2010 (age 16)	-	-	(England) Chelsea	2026 Euro Qualifiers
FW	Chelsea N’Drin	11 September 2009 (age 17)	-	-	(England) Liverpool	2026 Euro Qualifiers
FW	Jane Oboavwoduo	29 December 2009 (age 16)	-	-	(England) Manchester City	2026 Euro Qualifiers

== Schedule and results ==
This list includes match results from the last 12 months and any future matches that have been scheduled.

=== 2026 ===
9 February 2026 MIMA Cup	Mexico	0–1	England	San Pedro del Pinatar, Spain
15:30 GMT		Report	Brodie 84'	Stadium: Pinatar Arena

12 February 2026 MIMA Cup	Norway	0–0 (4–5 p)	England	San Pedro del Pinatar, Spain
15:30 GMT				Stadium: Pinatar Arena
	Penalties
			Katie Scott (penalty scored); Zoe Ciccardini (penalty scored); Bryony Brodie (penalty scored); Aysia Matabaro (penalty scored); Chelsea N’Drin (penalty scored)

14 February 2026 MIMA Cup	United States	Cancelled	England	San Pedro del Pinatar, Spain
				Stadium: Pinatar Arena
Note: Game was cancelled due to severe weather warnings in Spain

13 March 2026 2026 U17 UEFA Qualification Round 2	England	2–1	Turkey	Sisak, Croatia
13:00 GMT	Brodie 46'; Hirons 68'	Report	Tong 76'	Stadium: Gradski Stadion

16 March 2026 2026 U17 UEFA Qualification Round 2	England	1–0	Croatia	Karlovac, Croatia
11:00 GMT	De Beaulac 24'	Report		Stadium: Stadion Branko Čavlović-Čavlek

19 March 2026 2026 U17 UEFA Qualification Round 2	Italy	2–3	England	Sisak, Croatia
11:00 GMT	Oddina 22'; Ferranti 79'	Report	Hirons 9'; Brodie 50', 62'	Stadium: Gradski Stadion

4 May 2026 2026 UEFA Women's Under-17 Championship	Northern Ireland	0–2	England	Inver Park, Larne
15:00 BST		Report	De Bohan 29', 82'	Referee: Elisabet Calvo Valentín (Spain)

7 May 2026 2026 UEFA Women's Under-17 Championship	Germany	1–0	England	Inver Park, Larne
15:00 BST	Hebben 13' (pen.)	Report		Attendance: 227; Referee: Elena Gobjila (Moldova)

10 May 2026 2026 UEFA Women's Under-17 Championship	England	1–1	Norway	The Showgrounds, Coleraine
15:00 BST	N'Drin 63'	Report	Norebø 25'	Referee: Dong Fangyu (China)

14 May 2026 2026 UEFA Women's Under-17 Championship	England	0–2	Poland	Inver Park, Larne
16:00 BST		Report	Burzan 42', 55'	Referee: Elisabeth Calvo Valentín (Spain)

10 September 2026 Friendly	Finland	2–2 (3–2 p)	England	Jakobstad, Finland
16:30 BST	Palmu 56'; Patronen 78'	Report	Bangura 87'; Fisher 90+2'	Stadium: Project Liv Arena

13 September 2026 Friendly	Finland	2–1	England	Vaasa, Finland
11:00 BST	Pastinen 34'; Huikuri 48'	Report	Junaid 45+1'

== Head-to-head record ==
The following table shows England's head-to-head record in the FIFA U-17 Women's World Cup.

Opponent	Pld	W	D	L	GF	GA	GD	Win %
Brazil	2	2	0	0	5	1	+4	100.00
Germany	1	0	0	1	0	3	−3	0.00
Japan	3	0	2	1	4	7	−3	0.00
Kenya	1	1	0	0	2	0	+2	100.00
Mexico	1	1	0	0	4	2	+2	100.00
Nigeria	2	1	1	0	1	0	+1	50.00
North Korea	3	0	1	2	4	9	−5	0.00
South Korea	1	0	0	1	0	3	−3	0.00
Spain	1	0	0	1	0	3	−3	0.00
United States	1	0	0	1	0	3	−3	0.00
Total	16	5	4	7	20	31	−11	31.25
