= Elena Naumoska =

Macedonian footballer (born 1994)

Personal information
- Date of birth: 6 April 1994 (age 32)
- Position: Midfielder

International career^{‡}
Years	Team	Apps	(Gls)
2010	North Macedonia U-17	3	(0)
2010–2012	North Macedonia U-19	6	(0)
2010–2013	North Macedonia	11	(0)
- ‡ National team caps and goals as of 12:03, 19 September 2021 (UTC)

Elena Naumoska (born 6 April 1994) is a Macedonian footballer who plays as a midfielder for the North Macedonia national team.

== International career ==
Naumoska made her debut for the North Macedonia national team on 22 April 2020, against the Netherlands.
