= 2026 UEFA Women's Under-17 Championship =

Tournament details
- Host country: Northern Ireland
- Dates: 4–17 May
- Teams: 8 (from 1 confederation)
- Venues: 3 (in 3 host cities)

Final positions
- Champions: Germany (9th title)
- Runners-up: France

Tournament statistics
- Matches played: 15
- Goals scored: 37 (2.47 per match)
- Top scorer(s): (France) Rachael Adedini (Norway) Stine Ariell Solemdal (3 goals each)
- Best player: (Germany) Mirja Kropp
- Best goalkeeper: (Germany) Mirja Kropp

The 2026 UEFA Women's Under-17 Championship was the 17th edition of the UEFA Women's Under-17 Championship, the annual international youth football championship organised by UEFA for the women's under-17 national teams of Europe. Northern Ireland hosted the tournament. A total of eight teams played in the tournament, with players born on or after 1 January 2009 eligible to participate.

The defending champions were the Netherlands, having won their first title by defeating Norway 2–1 in the 2025 final, but were unable to defend their title as they did not qualify for this tournament.

This tournament also acted as UEFA's qualifier for the 2026 FIFA U-17 Women's World Cup in Morocco, with top five teams qualifying as the UEFA representatives.

== Qualification ==
A total of 50 out of 55 UEFA nations entered the qualifying competition, with the hosts Northern Ireland also competing despite already qualifying automatically, and seven teams qualified for the final tournament at the end of the qualifiers round 2 to join the hosts.

Team	Qualification method	Date of qualification	Appearance(s)				Previous best performance (Note: Bold text indicates they hosted that edition.)
Team	Qualification method	Date of qualification	Total (Note: Including this edition)	First	Last	Streak	Previous best performance
Northern Ireland	Host nation	26 September 2023	1st	Debut			
Germany	Round 2 Group A1 winners	5 March 2026	14th	2008	2023	1	Champions (2008, 2009, 2012, 2014, 2016, 2017, 2019, 2022)
England	Round 2 Group A2 winners	19 March 2026	10th	2008	2024	1	Runners-up (2024)
Finland	Round 2 Group A3 winners	15 March 2026	3rd	2018	2022	1	Third place (2018)
France	Round 2 Group A4 winners	20 March 2026	12th	2008	2025	5	Champions (2023)
Norway	Round 2 Group A5 winners	18 March 2026	8th	2009	2025	3	Runners-up (2025)
Spain	Round 2 Group A6 winners	7 March 2026	15th	2009	2025	12	Champions (2010, 2011, 2015, 2018, 2024)
Poland	Round 2 Group A7 winners	17 March 2026	6th	2013	2025	4	Champions (2013)

== Venues ==
The tournament was hosted in three venues.

2026 UEFA Women's Under-17 Championship is located in Northern Ireland	Belfast	Coleraine	Larne
2026 UEFA Women's Under-17 Championship is located in Northern Ireland	Windsor Park	The Showgrounds	Inver Park
2026 UEFA Women's Under-17 Championship is located in Northern Ireland	Capacity: 18,434	Capacity: 4,843	Capacity: 2,732

== Squads ==
Each national team had to submit a squad of 20 players, two of whom had to be goalkeepers.

== Group stage ==
The group winners and runners-up advanced to the semi-finals and automatically qualified for the 2026 FIFA U-17 Women's World Cup. The third-placed teams in both groups qualified for the play-off match, with the winner also qualifying for the 2026 FIFA U-17 Women's World Cup.

=== Tie-breaking criteria for group play ===
The ranking of teams in the group stage was determined as follows:

1. Points obtained in all group matches;
2. Points in head-to-head matches among tied teams;
3. Goal difference in head-to-head matches among tied teams;
4. Goals scored in head-to-head matches among tied teams;
5. If more than two teams were tied, and after applying all head-to-head criteria above, a subset of teams were still tied, all head-to-head criteria above were reapplied exclusively to this subset of teams;
6. Goal difference in all group matches;
7. Goals scored in all group matches;
8. Penalty shoot-out if only two teams had the same number of points, and they met in the last round of the group and were tied after applying all criteria above (not used if more than two teams had the same number of points, or if their rankings were not relevant for qualification for the next stage);
9. Disciplinary points
  - Yellow card: −1 point;
  - Indirect red card (second yellow card): −3 points;
  - Direct red card: −3 points;
10. UEFA coefficient for the qualifying round draw;
11. Drawing of lots.

=== Group A ===
Pos	Team	Pld	W	D	L	GF	GA	GD	Pts	Qualification
1	Germany	3	2	0	1	4	2	+2	6	Knockout stage and qualification for 2026 FIFA U-17 Women's World Cup
2	Norway	3	1	1	1	5	4	+1	4	Knockout stage and qualification for 2026 FIFA U-17 Women's World Cup
3	England	3	1	1	1	3	2	+1	4	Play-off match for the 2026 FIFA U-17 Women's World Cup
4	Northern Ireland (H)	3	1	0	2	1	5	−4	3	

Source: UEFA
Rules for classification: Group stage tiebreakers
(H) Hosts
4 May 2026
15:00

Northern Ireland	0–2	England
	Report	De Bohan 29', 82'

Inver Park, Larne
Attendance: 810
Referee: Elisabeth Calvo Valentín (Spain)
4 May 2026
18:00

Norway	1–3	Germany
Solemdal 77'	Report	Giesen 8'; Kleemann 62'; Putzer 86'

The Showgrounds, Coleraine
Attendance: 220
Referee: Frederikke Søkjær (Denmark)

7 May 2026
15:00

Germany	1–0	England
Hebben 13' (pen.)	Report

Inver Park, Larne
Attendance: 227
Referee: Elena Gobjila (Moldova)
7 May 2026
18:00

Northern Ireland	0–3	Norway
	Report	Lundhaug 10'; Lund 19'; Solemdal 79'

The Showgrounds, Coleraine
Attendance: 415
Referee: Joanna Vassallo (Malta)

10 May 2026
15:00

England	1–1	Norway
N'Drin 63'	Report	Norebø 25'

The Showgrounds, Coleraine
Referee: Dong Fangyu (China)
10 May 2026
15:00

Germany	0–1	Northern Ireland
	Report	Havern 77'

Inver Park, Larne
Referee: Kristina Kozoroh (Ukraine)

=== Group B ===
Pos	Team	Pld	W	D	L	GF	GA	GD	Pts	Qualification
1	France	3	3	0	0	10	1	+9	9	Knockout stage and qualification for 2026 FIFA U-17 Women's World Cup
2	Spain	3	2	0	1	8	2	+6	6	Knockout stage and qualification for 2026 FIFA U-17 Women's World Cup
3	Poland	3	1	0	2	2	9	−7	3	Play-off match for the 2026 FIFA U-17 Women's World Cup
4	Finland	3	0	0	3	1	9	−8	0	

Source: UEFA
Rules for classification: Group stage tiebreakers
5 May 2026
15:00

France	5–0	Poland
Motyka 18' (pen.); Adedini 20'; Dhalluin 41'; Prezelin 45+1'; Thomas 86'	Report

The Showgrounds, Coleraine
Attendance: 157
Referee: Dong Fangyu (China)
5 May 2026
18:00

Spain	4–0	Finland
Aymerich 7'; Fernández 14'; Cabetas 53'; Gálvez 87' (pen.)	Report

Inver Park, Larne
Attendance: 242
Referee: Kristina Kozoroh (Ukraine)

8 May 2026
15:00

France	1–0	Spain
Zidi 53'	Report

The Showgrounds, Coleraine
Attendance: 145
Referee: Tjaša Misja (Slovenia)
8 May 2026
18:00

Finland	0–1	Poland
	Report	Burzan 43'

Inver Park, Larne
Attendance: 178
Referee: Rita Vehapi (Kosovo)

11 May 2026
15:00

Finland	1–4	France
Ahonen 66'	Report	Collin 21'; Niakate 31'; Adedini 45+1' (pen.), 81'

The Showgrounds, Coleraine
Referee: Joanna Vassallo (Malta)
11 May 2026
15:00

Poland	1–4	Spain
Burzan 90+3'	Report	Ferrera 4'; Valladares 24'; Elaine 39'; Chacón 57'

Inver Park, Larne
Referee: Rita Vehapi (Kosovo)

== Play-off match ==
The two third-placed teams in each group played a 90-minute play-off match followed by a penalty shoot-out to decide the winners if necessary (no extra time was played), with the winning team qualifying for the 2026 FIFA U-17 Women's World Cup.

14 May 2026
16:00

England	0–2	Poland
	Report	Burzan 42', 55'

Inver Park, Larne
Referee: Elisabeth Calvo Valentín (Spain)

== Knockout stage ==
In the knockout stage, a penalty shoot-out was used to decide the winners if necessary (no extra time was played).

=== Bracket ===
Semi-finals
14 May – Belfast
Germany (p)	0 (4)
Spain	0 (3)
14 May – Belfast
France (p)	1 (3)
Norway	1 (1)

Final
17 May – Belfast
Germany	1
France	0

=== Semi-finals ===
14 May 2026
14:00

France	1–1	Norway
Motyka 42'	Report	Solemdal 54'
Penalties
Motyka (penalty scored); Adedini (penalty missed); Ane (penalty scored); Bento (penalty scored)	3–1	(penalty missed) Lund; (penalty missed) Balmforth; (penalty scored) Melgård; (penalty missed) Fedeler

Windsor Park, Belfast
Referee: Elena Gobjila (Moldova)
14 May 2026
18:00

Germany	0–0	Spain
	Report
Penalties
Putzer (penalty scored); Martens (penalty scored); Dafinger (penalty scored); Kessler (penalty scored)	4–3	(penalty scored) Ohlander; (penalty scored) Fernández; (penalty missed) Chacón; (penalty scored) Gálvez; (penalty missed) Cabetas

Windsor Park, Belfast
Referee: Tjaša Misja (Slovenia)

=== Final ===
17 May 2026
18:00

Germany	1–0	France
Kleemann 29'	Report

Windsor Park, Belfast
Attendance: 1,230
Referee: Frederikke Søkjær (Denmark)

== Goalscorers ==
There were 37 goals scored in 15 matches, for an average of 2.47 goals per match.

3 goals

- (France) Rachael Adedini
- (Norway) Stine Ariell Solemdal

2 goals

- (England) Phoebe De Bohan
- (France) Léa Motyka
- (Germany) Marie Kleemann
- (Poland) Zofia Burzan

1 goal

- (England) Chelsea N'Drin
- (Finland) Hertta Ahonen
- (France) Margot Collin
- (France) Elise Dhalluin
- (France) Diénébou Niakate
- (France) Elsa Prezelin
- (France) Candince Thomas
- (France) Méhisane Zidi
- (Germany) Mia Giesen
- (Germany) Johanna Hebben
- (Germany) Johanna Putzer
- (Northern Ireland) Charlotte Havern
- (Norway) Isa Lund
- (Norway) Davis Lundhaug
- (Norway) Sofia Norebø
- (Spain) María Aymerich
- (Spain) Laia Cabetas
- (Spain) Carlota Chacón
- (Spain) Rocío Elaine
- (Spain) Iraia Fernández
- (Spain) Carolina Ferrera
- (Spain) Ángela Gálvez
- (Spain) Maialen Valladares

== Awards ==
The following awards were given after the tournament:

- Player of the Tournament: (Germany) Mirja Kropp
- Top Scorer(s): (France) Rachael Adedini, (Norway) Stine Ariell Solemdal (3 goals)

=== Team of the Tournament ===
After the tournament, the Under-17 Team of the Tournament was selected by the UEFA Technical Observer panel.

Position	Player
Goalkeeper	(Germany) Mirja Kropp
Defenders	(Germany) Laura Ernst
Defenders	(France) Rosie Olando
Defenders	(Germany) Muriel Dürr
Defenders	(Spain) Iraia Fernández
Midfielders	(France) Odélia Tae
Midfielders	(Norway) Stine Ariell Solemdal
Midfielders	(Germany) Johanna Hebben
Forwards	(France) Léa Motyka
Forwards	(France) Rachael Adedini
Forwards	(Spain) Ángela Gálvez

== Qualified teams for FIFA U-17 Women's World Cup ==
The following five teams from UEFA qualified for the 2026 FIFA U-17 Women's World Cup in Morocco.

Team	Qualified on	Previous appearances in FIFA U-17 Women's World Cup^{1}
Germany	7 May 2026	7 (2008, 2010, 2012, 2014, 2016, 2018, 2022)
France	8 May 2026	4 (2008, **2012**, 2022, 2025)
Norway	10 May 2026	1 (2025)
Spain	11 May 2026	7 (2010, 2014, 2016, **2018**, **2022**, 2024, 2025)
Poland	14 May 2026	1 (2024)

^{1} Bold indicates champions for that year.
