= Cidade do Futebol =

Sports complex of the Portuguese Football Federation

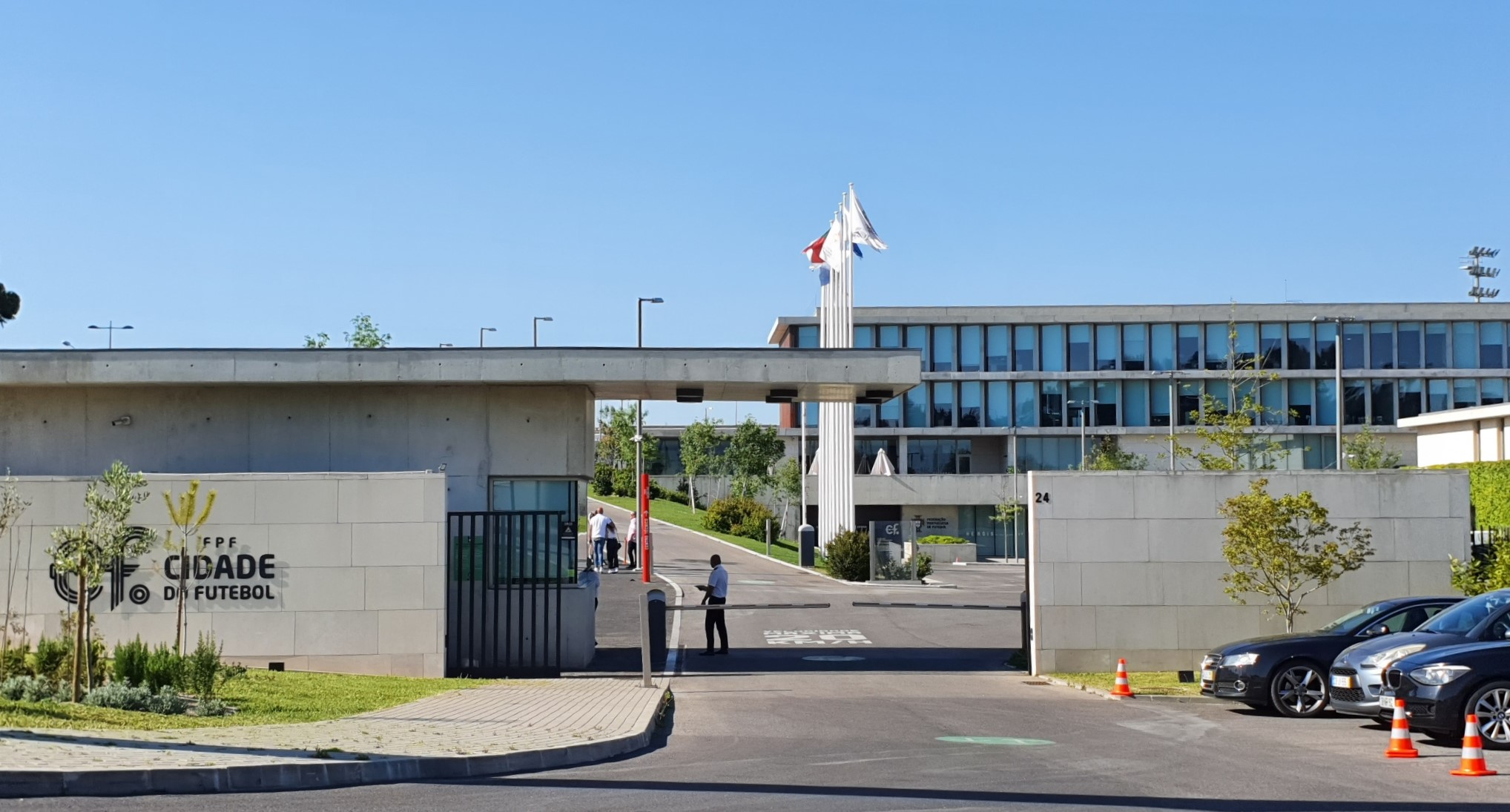
Main entrance to the Cidade do Futebol

The Cidade do Futebol (Portuguese for 'City of Football') is a sports complex inaugurated by the Portuguese Football Federation on 31 March 2016, that acts as the national teams' training center. In all three phases of the Football City, 90 million euros have been invested, said Fernando Gomes, the president in office at the time and one of the key figures behind that achievement.

The new home of the Portuguese Football Federation is located on Avenida das Seleções in Oeiras, 1495-433 Cruz Quebrada - Dafundo, and made its debut with an under-15 tournament the day after it opened.

== History ==
Although it was inaugurated in the presence of the President of the Republic, Marcelo Rebelo de Sousa, the sports complex was built solely with funds from the FPF and with the support of 6.5 million from UEFA and 1 million from FIFA and without financial support from the Portuguese state.

Phase 1 of Cidade do Futebol took 17 months to build and had a budget of 15 million euros. This phase, which corresponds to the Federation's headquarters and the home of the National Football Teams, has three training pitches and one for goalkeepers, eleven changing rooms, two gyms, a hydrotherapy centre and a nucleus of offices for the work of the technical team and support staff.

Phase 2 also saw the construction of the Athletes‘ House, which is exclusively for the accommodation of the national team's footballers.

Cidade do Futebol will grow again in November 2024 with the completion of Phase 3 of this project. This phase will see the inauguration of the infrastructure dedicated to pavilion sports, particularly for the Futsal Teams. The Arena Portugal, with a capacity for 240 spectators,, will provide all the facilities necessary for the work of the athletes and support staff, as well as common leisure and monitoring areas for the USP (Health and Performance Unit). The Beach Soccer Teams will also be provided with a sand pitch.

Still to be inaugurated are the spaces already under construction at Canal 11's new headquarters, newsroom space, studios, multipurpose and work rooms, as well as a Congress Centre and an auditorium.
