= Northern Ireland women's national under-17 football team =

National association football team

Northern Ireland U-17
- Association: Irish Football Association
- Confederation: UEFA (Europe)
- Head coach: Danielle McDowell-Tuffey
- Top scorer: Aimee Mackin (6)
First colours	Second colours

First international
- Scotland 6-0 Northern Ireland (Croatia; 20 October 2007)

Biggest win
- Kazakhstan 0-5 Northern Ireland (Ioannina, Greece; 18 October 2018)

Biggest defeat
- Austria 9-0 Northern Ireland (Luso, Italy; 28 September 2017)

UEFA Women's Under-17 Championship
- Appearances: 1 (first in 2026)
- Best result: Group stage (2026)

The Northern Ireland women's national under-17 football team represents Northern Ireland in international youth football competitions and is controlled by the Northern Ireland Women's Football Association (NIWFA), the women's football arm of the Irish Football Association (IFA) and the governing body for women's football in Northern Ireland.

== FIFA U-17 World Cup ==
The team has never qualified.

Year	Result	Matches	Wins	Draws*	Losses	GF	GA
(New Zealand) 2008	Did not qualify						
(Trinidad and Tobago) 2010	Did not qualify						
(Azerbaijan) 2012	Did not qualify						
(Costa Rica) 2014	Did not qualify						
(Jordan) 2016	Did not qualify						
(Uruguay) 2018	Did not qualify						
(India) 2022	Did not qualify						
(Dominican Republic) 2024	Did not qualify						
(Morocco) 2025	Did not qualify						
(Morocco) 2026	Did not qualify						
(Morocco) 2027	TBD						
(Morocco) 2028	TBD						
(Morocco) 2029	TBD						
Total	0/9	0	0	0	0	0	0

== UEFA Under-17 Championship ==
The Northern Ireland U17 team took part in the qualification for the UEFA Under-17 Championship in 2008 and has consistently participated since 2011. The team has qualified in 2026 as hosts.

Year	Round	Pld	W	D	L	GF	GA	Squad
(Switzerland) 2008	Did not qualify							
(Switzerland) 2009	Did not qualify							
(Switzerland) 2010	Did not qualify							
(Switzerland) 2011	Did not qualify							
(Switzerland) 2012	Did not qualify							
(Switzerland) 2013	Did not qualify							
(England) 2014	Did not qualify							
(Iceland) 2015	Did not qualify							
(Belarus) 2016	Did not qualify							
(Czech Republic) 2017	Did not qualify							
(Lithuania) 2018	Did not qualify							
(Bulgaria) 2019	Did not qualify							
(Sweden) 2020	Cancelled due to the COVID-19 pandemic							
(Faroe Islands) 2021	Cancelled due to the COVID-19 pandemic							
(Bosnia and Herzegovina) 2022	Did not qualify							
(Estonia) 2023	Did not qualify							
(Sweden) 2024	Did not qualify							
(Faroe Islands) 2025	Did not qualify							
(Northern Ireland) 2026	Group stage	3	1	0	2	1	5	Squad
(Finland) 2027	to be determined							
(Belgium) 2028	to be determined							
(Turkey) 2029	to be determined							

== Results and fixtures ==
The following is a list of match results in the last 12 months, as well as any future matches that have been scheduled.

Legend

Win Draw Lose Fixture

=== 2026 ===
4 May 2026 UEFA Women's Under-17 Championship	Northern Ireland	0–2	England	Larne, County Antrim
15:00 GMT		Report	De Bohan 29', 82'	Stadium: Inver Park; Attendance: 810; Referee: Elisabeth Calvo Valentín (Spain)

7 May 2026 UEFA Women's Under-17 Championship	Northern Ireland	0–3	Norway	Coleraine, County Londonderry
18:00 GMT		Report	Lundhaug 10'; Lund 19'; Solemdal 79'	Stadium: The Showgrounds; Attendance: 415; Referee: Joanna Vassallo (Malta)

10 May 2026 UEFA Women's Under-17 Championship	Germany	0–1	Northern Ireland	Larne, County Antrim
15:00 GMT		Report	Havern 77'	Stadium: Inver Park; Referee: Kristina Kozoroh (Ukraine)

7 October 2027 UEFA Under-17 Championship qualification	Norway	v	Northern Ireland
		Report

10 October 2027 UEFA Under-17 Championship qualification	Austria	v	Northern Ireland
		Report

13 October 2027 UEFA Under-17 Championship qualification	Northern Ireland	v	Italy
		Report

== Current squad ==
The following players were named in the squad for the 2026 UEFA Women's Under-17 Championship.

Head coach: Danielle McDowell-Tuffey

No.	Pos.	Player	Date of birth (age)	Club
1	GK	Sophie Glover	15 May 2009 (age 17)	(Irish Football Association) Crusaders Strikers
12	GK	Ifeoma Agoha	21 September 2011 (age 15)	(Irish Football Association) Derry City
2	DF	Daisy Moore	1 May 2009 (age 17)	(Irish Football Association) Crusaders Strikers
3	DF	Holly Hilton	30 November 2009 (age 16)	(Irish Football Association) Lisburn Rangers
5	DF	Chloe Beckinsale	19 October 2009 (age 17)	(Irish Football Association) Crusaders Strikers
14	DF	Ellie McGarrigle	6 October 2009 (age 17)	(Irish Football Association) Sion Swifts
15	DF	Zion Donnan	20 February 2011 (age 15)	(Irish Football Association) Crusaders Strikers
19	DF	Sara Devany	26 April 2011 (age 15)	(Irish Football Association) Glentoran
20	DF	Grace Steele	2 April 2010 (age 16)	(Irish Football Association) Glentoran
4	MF	Mirjana Karrabecaj	30 April 2009 (age 17)	(Irish Football Association) Linfield
6	MF	Heidi Curran	15 September 2009 (age 17)	(Irish Football Association) Crusaders Strikers
7	MF	Emilee Leacock	27 February 2009 (age 17)	(Irish Football Association) Crusaders Strikers
8	MF	Charlotte Havern	16 October 2009 (age 17)	(Irish Football Association) Cliftonville
11	MF	Siún Kirby	26 March 2009 (age 17)	(Football Association of Ireland) Dundalk
13	MF	Leah Hepburn	17 December 2011 (age 14)	(Irish Football Association) Loughgall Lakers
9	FW	Maja Stachura	25 April 2009 (age 17)	(Irish Football Association) Crusaders Strikers
10	FW	Abbie Smyth	16 April 2009 (age 17)	(Irish Football Association) Lisburn Rangers
16	FW	Anna Rose Robinson	14 July 2010 (age 16)	(Irish Football Association) Cliftonville
17	FW	Ava Hurl	1 February 2009 (age 17)	(Irish Football Association) Crusaders Strikers
18	FW	Sydney Wilson	1 December 2009 (age 16)	(Canadian Soccer Association) Pickering

== See also ==
- Northern Ireland women's national football team
- Northern Ireland women's national under-19 football team
