= Ellen Tanner Marsh =

Ellen Tanner Marsh is an author from Charleston, South Carolina.

Marsh has written eleven novels, three of which - Reap the Savage Wind, Wrap Me in Splendor, and Sable - were listed on the New York Times bestseller list for paperbacks.

Marsh has a working relationship with BookSurge.com, a vanity press owned by Amazon.com. As a premium add-on service, BookSurge allows self-publishing authors to purchase a personally crafted review written by "New York Times bestselling author, Ellen Tanner Marsh."
