= 2019 UEFA Women's Under-17 Championship qualification =

Tournament details
- Dates: Qualifying round: 19 September – 28 October 2018; Elite round: 10–30 March 2019
- Teams: 46 (from 1 confederation)

Tournament statistics
- Matches played: 108
- Goals scored: 407 (3.77 per match)
- Top scorer: (Netherlands) Nikita Tromp (12 goals)

The 2019 UEFA Women's Under-17 Championship qualifying competition was a women's under-17 football competition that determined the seven teams joining the automatically qualified hosts Bulgaria in the 2019 UEFA Women's Under-17 Championship final tournament.

Apart from Bulgaria, 46 of the remaining 54 UEFA member national teams entered the qualifying competition. Players born on or after 1 January 2002 were eligible to participate. Starting from this season, up to five substitutions are permitted per team in each match. Moreover, each match has a regular duration of 90 minutes, instead of 80 minutes in previous seasons.

== Format ==
The qualifying competition consists of two rounds:

- Qualifying round: Apart from Germany and Spain, which receive byes to the elite round as the teams with the highest seeding coefficient, the remaining 44 teams are drawn into 11 groups of four teams. Each group is played in single round-robin format at one of the teams selected as hosts after the draw. The 11 group winners, the 11 runners-up, and the four third-placed teams with the best record against the first and second-placed teams in their group advance to the elite round.
- Elite round: The 28 teams are drawn into seven groups of four teams. Each group is played in single round-robin format at one of the teams selected as hosts after the draw. The seven group winners qualify for the final tournament.

The schedule of each group is as follows, with two rest days between each matchday (Regulations Article 20.04):

Group schedule
Matchday	Matches
Matchday 1	1 v 4, 3 v 2
Matchday 2	1 v 3, 2 v 4
Matchday 3	2 v 1, 4 v 3

=== Tiebreakers ===
In the qualifying round and elite round, teams are ranked according to points (3 points for a win, 1 point for a draw, 0 points for a loss), and if tied on points, the following tiebreaking criteria are applied, in the order given, to determine the rankings (Regulations Articles 14.01 and 14.02):

1. Points in head-to-head matches among tied teams;
2. Goal difference in head-to-head matches among tied teams;
3. Goals scored in head-to-head matches among tied teams;
4. If more than two teams are tied, and after applying all head-to-head criteria above, a subset of teams are still tied, all head-to-head criteria above are reapplied exclusively to this subset of teams;
5. Goal difference in all group matches;
6. Goals scored in all group matches;
7. Penalty shoot-out if only two teams have the same number of points, and they met in the last round of the group and are tied after applying all criteria above (not used if more than two teams have the same number of points, or if their rankings are not relevant for qualification for the next stage);
8. Disciplinary points (red card = 3 points, yellow card = 1 point, expulsion for two yellow cards in one match = 3 points);
9. UEFA coefficient for the qualifying round draw;
10. Drawing of lots.

To determine the four best third-placed teams from the qualifying round, the results against the teams in fourth place are discarded. The following criteria are applied (Regulations Article 15.01):

1. Points;
2. Goal difference;
3. Goals scored;
4. Disciplinary points;
5. UEFA coefficient for the qualifying round draw;
6. Drawing of lots.

== Qualifying round ==
=== Draw ===
The draw for the qualifying round was held on 24 November 2017, 09:00 CET (UTC+1), at the UEFA headquarters in Nyon, Switzerland.

The teams were seeded according to their coefficient ranking, calculated based on the following (a four-year window was used instead of the previous three-year window):

- 2014 UEFA Women's Under-17 Championship final tournament and qualifying competition (qualifying round and elite round)
- 2015 UEFA Women's Under-17 Championship final tournament and qualifying competition (qualifying round and elite round)
- 2016 UEFA Women's Under-17 Championship final tournament and qualifying competition (qualifying round and elite round)
- 2017 UEFA Women's Under-17 Championship final tournament and qualifying competition (qualifying round and elite round)

Each group contained one team from Pot A, one team from Pot B, one team from Pot C, and one team from Pot D. For political reasons, Russia and Ukraine would not be drawn in the same group.

Final tournament hosts
Team	Coeff	Rank
**Bulgaria**	4.000	—

Bye to elite round
Team	Coeff	Rank
**Germany**	31.667	1
**Spain**	30.944	2

Teams entering qualifying round

Pot A
Team	Coeff	Rank
**England**	22.667	3
Norway	21.500	4
France	18.944	5
Italy	16.833	6
Republic of Ireland	15.722	7
Switzerland	15.278	8
**Netherlands**	14.889	9
**Austria**	14.111	10
Czech Republic	13.222	11
Scotland	12.444	12
Belgium	12.167	13

Pot B
Team	Coeff	Rank
**Denmark**	12.000	14
Sweden	11.667	15
Iceland	11.167	16
Finland	10.500	17
Poland	10.167	18
Hungary	9.667	19
Russia	9.667	20
Serbia	9.667	21
Greece	8.500	22
**Portugal**	8.333	23
Belarus	7.000	24

Pot C
Team	Coeff	Rank
Slovenia	6.333	25
Northern Ireland	5.833	26
Turkey	5.500	27
Wales	5.167	28
Romania	4.833	29
Slovakia	4.667	30
Ukraine	3.833	31
Bosnia and Herzegovina	3.667	32
Croatia	3.333	33
Azerbaijan	3.000	34
Latvia	1.333	35

Pot D
Team	Coeff	Rank
Macedonia	1.333	36
Faroe Islands	1.000	37
Montenegro	1.000	38
Israel	1.000	39
Estonia	0.333	40
Kazakhstan	0.333	41
Lithuania	0.333	42
Moldova	0.333	43
Georgia	0.000	44
Andorra	0.000	45
Albania	—	46

Notes

- Teams marked in **bold** have qualified for the final tournament.

Did not enter
Armenia	Cyprus	Gibraltar	Kosovo
Liechtenstein	Luxembourg	Malta	San Marino

=== Groups ===
The qualifying round must be played between 1 August and 28 October 2018.

Times up to 27 October 2018 are CEST (UTC+2), thereafter times are CET (UTC+1), as listed by UEFA (local times, if different, are in parentheses).

==== Group 1 ====
Pos	Team	Pld	W	D	L	GF	GA	GD	Pts	Qualification
1	Denmark (H)	3	3	0	0	14	1	+13	**9**	Elite round
2	Czech Republic	3	2	0	1	7	4	+3	**6**	Elite round
3	Ukraine	3	1	0	2	4	7	−3	**3**	
4	Faroe Islands	3	0	0	3	3	16	−13	**0**	

Source: UEFA
Rules for classification: Qualification tiebreakers
(H) Hosts
15 October 2018
14:00

Czech Republic	5–1	Faroe Islands
Holá 21', 24'; Sováková 29', 60'; Marcinková 40'	Report	Lisberg 89' (pen.)

Ringkøbing Stadion, Ringkøbing
Referee: Yuliya Larionova (Azerbaijan)
15 October 2018
14:00

Ukraine	0–4	Denmark
	Report	Kramer 9', 17', 24'; Frederiksen 46'

Skjern Stadion, Skjern
Referee: Alina Peşu (Romania)

18 October 2018
14:00

Czech Republic	2–0	Ukraine
Marcinková 7'; Růžičková 85'	Report

Skjern Stadion, Skjern
Referee: María Dolores Martínez Madrona (Spain)
18 October 2018
14:00

Denmark	7–1	Faroe Islands
Kramer 9', 28'; Frederiksen 48'; Lundgaard 62'; Nielsen 69'; Neshamar 90+3' (o.g.); M. Carstens 90+5'	Report	Augustinussen 19'

Ringkøbing Stadion, Ringkøbing
Referee: Alina Peşu (Romania)

21 October 2018
14:00

Denmark	3–0	Czech Republic
Kramer 6'; Bredgaard 41'; Lundgaard 87'	Report

Ringkøbing Stadion, Ringkøbing
Referee: María Dolores Martínez Madrona (Spain)
21 October 2018
14:00

Faroe Islands	1–4	Ukraine
Klementsen 87'	Report	Godunko 10'; Salivonchyk 62'; Krevska 79'; Kunina 90'

Skjern Stadion, Skjern
Referee: Yuliya Larionova (Azerbaijan)

==== Group 2 ====
Pos	Team	Pld	W	D	L	GF	GA	GD	Pts	Qualification
1	Norway	3	3	0	0	8	1	+7	**9**	Elite round
2	Russia	3	2	0	1	7	2	+5	**6**	Elite round
3	Croatia (H)	3	1	0	2	1	5	−4	**3**	
4	Israel	3	0	0	3	0	8	−8	**0**	

Source: UEFA
Rules for classification: Qualification tiebreakers
(H) Hosts
19 October 2018
11:30

Norway	2–0	Israel
Kuznezov 83' (o.g.); Aune 90'	Report

Stadion Valbruna, Rovinj
Referee: Veronika Kovarova (Czech Republic)
19 October 2018
14:00

Croatia	0–1	Russia
	Report	Voronko 65'

Stadion Veli Jože, Poreč
Referee: Laura Rapp (Sweden)

22 October 2018
11:30

Russia	5–0	Israel
Tchato 10'; Voronko 13'; Trofimova 27' (pen.); Fetisova 40'; Yuklyaeva 41'	Report

Stadion Veli Jože, Poreč
Referee: Laura Rapp (Sweden)
22 October 2018
14:00

Norway	4–0	Croatia
Revees 11', 51'; Aune 26'; Østerås 50'	Report

Stadion Valbruna, Rovinj
Referee: Dimitrina Milkova (Bulgaria)

25 October 2018
14:00

Russia	1–2	Norway
Trofimova 58'	Report	Edvartsen 31'; Øgegaard 87'

Stadion Valbruna, Rovinj
Referee: Dimitrina Milkova (Bulgaria)
25 October 2018
14:00

Israel	0–1	Croatia
	Report	Petarić 86'

Stadion Veli Jože, Poreč
Referee: Veronika Kovarova (Czech Republic)

==== Group 3 ====
Pos	Team	Pld	W	D	L	GF	GA	GD	Pts	Qualification
1	Italy	3	3	0	0	5	1	+4	**9**	Elite round
2	Finland	3	2	0	1	7	2	+5	**6**	Elite round
3	Romania	3	1	0	2	2	6	−4	**3**	
4	Montenegro (H)	3	0	0	3	2	7	−5	**0**	

Source: UEFA
Rules for classification: Qualification tiebreakers
(H) Hosts
22 October 2018
12:00

Italy	2–1	Montenegro
Battelani 46'; Anghileri 90+2'	Report	Di Bari 83' (o.g.)

Stari Ribnjak Stadium, Podgorica
Referee: Chryso Georgiou (Cyprus)
22 October 2018
12:00

Romania	0–4	Finland
	Report	Anttonen 30'; Karjalainen 46'; Nurmi 82', 90+1'

Stadion Trešnjica, Golubovci
Referee: Sandra Strub (Switzerland)

25 October 2018
12:00

Italy	1–0	Romania
Corrado 82' (pen.)	Report

Gradski stadion, Nikšić
Referee: Tinna Høj Christensen (Denmark)
25 October 2018
12:00

Finland	3–0	Montenegro
Forsblom 35', 45+1'; Nurmi 67'	Report

Stari Ribnjak Stadium, Podgorica
Referee: Sandra Strub (Switzerland)

28 October 2018
12:00

Finland	0–2	Italy
	Report	Anghileri 1'; Battelani 64'

Camp FSCG, Podgorica
Referee: Tinna Høj Christensen (Denmark)
28 October 2018
12:00

Montenegro	1–2	Romania
Karličić 58'	Report	Pana 38'; Dimulescu 90+2'

Stari Ribnjak Stadium, Podgorica
Referee: Chryso Georgiou (Cyprus)

==== Group 4 ====
Pos	Team	Pld	W	D	L	GF	GA	GD	Pts	Qualification
1	Poland (H)	3	3	0	0	10	3	+7	**9**	Elite round
2	Scotland	3	1	1	1	2	4	−2	**4**	Elite round
3	Slovakia	3	0	2	1	2	3	−1	**2**	Elite round
4	Lithuania	3	0	1	2	2	6	−4	**1**	

Source: UEFA
Rules for classification: Qualification tiebreakers
(H) Hosts
4 October 2018
11:00

Scotland	2–1	Lithuania
Mcgovern 2' (pen.); Maughan 21'	Report	Jonušaitė 90+4'

Stadion Kazimierza Deyny, Starogard Gdański
Referee: Sabina Bolić (Croatia)
4 October 2018
15:30

Slovakia	2–3	Poland
Morávková 69'; Mazúchová 90+3'	Report	Tomasiak 20', 58' (pen.); Kiszkis 55'

Stadion Kazimierza Deyny, Starogard Gdański
Referee: Irina Turovskaya (Belarus)

7 October 2018
11:00

Scotland	0–0	Slovakia
	Report

Stadion Miejski, Malbork
Referee: Aleksandra Česen (Slovenia)
7 October 2018
15:30

Poland	4–1	Lithuania
Zieniewicz 21'; Achcińska 22', 90+2'; Kozak 48'	Report	Sabatauskaitė 87'

Stadion Miejski, Malbork
Referee: Irina Turovskaya (Belarus)

10 October 2018
14:00

Poland	3–0	Scotland
Padilla 1'; Kozak 79', 90+1'	Report

Stadion Miejski, Malbork
Referee: Aleksandra Česen (Slovenia)
10 October 2018
14:00

Lithuania	0–0	Slovakia
	Report

Stadion Kazimierza Deyny, Starogard Gdański
Referee: Sabina Bolić (Croatia)

==== Group 5 ====
Pos	Team	Pld	W	D	L	GF	GA	GD	Pts	Qualification
1	England	3	3	0	0	15	0	+15	**9**	Elite round
2	Iceland	3	2	0	1	7	2	+5	**6**	Elite round
3	Azerbaijan	3	0	1	2	1	9	−8	**1**	
4	Moldova (H)	3	0	1	2	1	13	−12	**1**	

Source: UEFA
Rules for classification: Qualification tiebreakers
(H) Hosts
19 September 2018
14:00 (15:00 EEST)

England	6–0	Moldova
Filis 38' (pen.), 88', 90+5' (pen.); Stables 65'; Robinson 73'; Grant 90+1'	Report

Zimbru Stadium, Chișinău
Referee: Merima Čelik (Bosnia and Herzegovina)
19 September 2018
14:00 (15:00 EEST)

Azerbaijan	0–1	Iceland
	Report	Þórhallsdóttir 65'

CSR Orhei, Orhei
Referee: Victoria Beyer (France)

22 September 2018
14:00 (15:00 EEST)

England	7–0	Azerbaijan
Robinson 19', 28'; Goodwin 35', 73'; Grant 66'; Safaraliyeva 81' (o.g.); Hack 90+2'	Report

Stadionul CPSM, Vadul lui Vodă
Referee: Catarina Campos (Portugal)
22 September 2018
14:00 (15:00 EEST)

Iceland	6–0	Moldova
Sigurðardóttir 21' (pen.), 44' (pen.), 49' (pen.); Hermannsdóttir 76'; Sigurjónsdóttir 83'; Ólafsdóttir Gros 90+2'	Report

Zimbru Stadium, Chișinău
Referee: Victoria Beyer (France)

25 September 2018
14:00 (15:00 EEST)

Iceland	0–2	England
	Report	Filis 65'; Stables 87'

CSR Orhei, Orhei
Referee: Catarina Campos (Portugal)
25 September 2018
14:00 (15:00 EEST)

Moldova	1–1	Azerbaijan
Tez 57' (pen.)	Report	Cakan 61'

Zimbru Stadium, Chișinău
Referee: Merima Čelik (Bosnia and Herzegovina)

==== Group 6 ====
Pos	Team	Pld	W	D	L	GF	GA	GD	Pts	Qualification
1	Belgium	3	3	0	0	13	1	+12	**9**	Elite round
2	Portugal (H)	3	2	0	1	15	3	+12	**6**	Elite round
3	Turkey	3	1	0	2	4	6	−2	**3**	
4	Andorra	3	0	0	3	0	22	−22	**0**	

Source: UEFA
Rules for classification: Qualification tiebreakers
(H) Hosts
19 September 2018
16:00 (15:00 WEST)

Belgium	8–0	Andorra
Buyle 12'; Borja 18' (o.g.); Fon 35', 45'; Gielen 71'; Maes 72'; Vanzeir 86' (pen.); Lemmens 87'	Report

Complexo Desportivo Clube de Futebol de Fão, Fão
Referee: Jelena Pejković (Croatia)
19 September 2018
18:00 (17:00 WEST)

Turkey	1–3	Portugal
Tekmen 71'	Report	Negrão 37'; Nazareth 45+2'; Jacinto 68'

Cidade Desportiva Sporting Clube de Braga, Braga
Referee: Rasa Imanalijeva (Lithuania)

22 September 2018
16:00 (15:00 WEST)

Belgium	3–0	Turkey
Janssens 8'; Fon 56' (pen.); Teulings 84'	Report

Estádio Municipal 22 de Junho, Vila Nova de Famalicão
Referee: Triinu Laos (Estonia)
22 September 2018
18:00 (17:00 WEST)

Portugal	11–0	Andorra
Albuquerque 16' (pen.), 85', 87' (pen.); Negrão 50', 56', 67', 90'; Jacinto 59'; Nazareth 77'; Marques 88', 90+1'	Report

Estádio Cidade de Barcelos, Barcelos
Referee: Rasa Imanalijeva (Lithuania)

25 September 2018
18:00 (17:00 WEST)

Portugal	1–2	Belgium
Nazareth 3'	Report	Teulings 69', 90'

Estádio Cidade de Barcelos, Barcelos
Referee: Triinu Laos (Estonia)
25 September 2018
18:00 (17:00 WEST)

Andorra	0–3	Turkey
	Report	Içen 16'; Alayont 19', 45+1'

Estádio Municipal de Fafe, Fafe
Referee: Jelena Pejković (Croatia)

==== Group 7 ====
Pos	Team	Pld	W	D	L	GF	GA	GD	Pts	Qualification
1	Serbia (H)	3	3	0	0	13	0	+13	**9**	Elite round
2	Republic of Ireland	3	1	1	1	14	1	+13	**4**	Elite round
3	Wales	3	1	1	1	2	4	−2	**4**	Elite round
4	Albania	3	0	0	3	0	24	−24	**0**	

Source: UEFA
Rules for classification: Qualification tiebreakers
(H) Hosts
22 October 2018
12:00

Republic of Ireland	14–0	Albania
O'Mahony 3' (pen.), 45+1'; Whelan 7', 25', 52'; Kraft 9', 40', 48', 50'; Ziu 21', 66' (pen.); Keogh 85', 87'; Dodd 90+3'	Report

Sports Center of FA of Serbia, Stara Pazova
Referee: Meitar Shemesh (Israel)
22 October 2018
17:00

Wales	0–4	Serbia
	Report	Tanasković 18', 64'; Petrović 55', 73' (pen.)

Sports Center of FA of Serbia, Stara Pazova
Referee: Alexandra Ponomareva (Russia)

25 October 2018
12:00

Republic of Ireland	0–0	Wales
	Report

Sports Center of FA of Serbia, Stara Pazova
Referee: Iuliana Demetrescu (Romania)
25 October 2018
17:00

Serbia	8–0	Albania
Tanasković 1'; Petrović 13'; Ćirić 20', 36', 81'; Host 66'; Vasović 68'; Čavić 89'	Report

Sports Center of FA of Serbia, Stara Pazova
Referee: Alexandra Ponomareva (Russia)

28 October 2018
14:00

Serbia	1–0	Republic of Ireland
Tanasković 12'	Report

Sports Center of FA of Serbia, Stara Pazova
Referee: Iuliana Demetrescu (Romania)
28 October 2018
14:00

Albania	0–2	Wales
	Report	Longhurst 57'; Collyer 79'

Sports Center of FA of Serbia pitch 4, Stara Pazova
Referee: Meitar Shemesh (Israel)

==== Group 8 ====
Pos	Team	Pld	W	D	L	GF	GA	GD	Pts	Qualification
1	Austria	3	3	0	0	12	0	+12	**9**	Elite round
2	Slovenia	3	1	0	2	3	5	−2	**3 (Note: Head-to-head results: Slovenia 3–0 Belarus, Belarus 2–0 Estonia, Estonia 1–0 Slovenia. Head-to-head standings: Slovenia: 3 pts, +2 GD (3 GF, 1 GA); Belarus: 3 pts, −1 GD (2 GF, 3 GA); Estonia: 3 pts, −1 GD (1 GF, 2 GA))**	Elite round
3	Belarus	3	1	0	2	2	4	−2	**3**	
4	Estonia (H)	3	1	0	2	1	9	−8	**3**	

Source: UEFA
Rules for classification: Qualification tiebreakers
(H) Hosts
Notes:
23 September 2018
15:00 (16:00 EEST)

Austria	7–0	Estonia
Wurzer 7', 70'; Magerl 13'; Pfanner 15'; Wienerroither 35'; Schasching 43' (pen.); Sarac 80'	Report

A. Le Coq Arena, Tallinn
Referee: Jelena Jermolajeva (Latvia)
23 September 2018
15:00 (16:00 EEST)

Slovenia	3–0	Belarus
Suhoveršnik 38', 90'; Igerc 60'	Report

Kadriorg Stadium, Tallinn
Referee: Emilie Dokset (Norway)

26 September 2018
15:00 (16:00 EEST)

Austria	4–0	Slovenia
Purtscheller 17', 60'; Schasching 55'; Pfanner 80'	Report

Kadriorg Stadium, Tallinn
Referee: Neslihan Muratdağı (Turkey)
26 September 2018
17:00 (18:00 EEST)

Belarus	2–0	Estonia
Asmykovich 87'; Kharitonchik 90+1'	Report

A. Le Coq Arena, Tallinn
Referee: Emilie Dokset (Norway)

29 September 2018
15:00 (16:00 EEST)

Belarus	0–1	Austria
	Report	Schasching 29'

Kadriorg Stadium, Tallinn
Referee: Neslihan Muratdağı (Turkey)
29 September 2018
15:00 (16:00 EEST)

Estonia	1–0	Slovenia
Reinik 60' (pen.)	Report

A. Le Coq Arena, Tallinn
Referee: Jelena Jermolajeva (Latvia)

==== Group 9 ====
Pos	Team	Pld	W	D	L	GF	GA	GD	Pts	Qualification
1	Greece (H)	3	3	0	0	12	3	+9	**9**	Elite round
2	Switzerland	3	1	1	1	7	3	+4	**4**	Elite round
3	Northern Ireland	3	1	1	1	7	4	+3	**4**	Elite round
4	Kazakhstan	3	0	0	3	1	17	−16	**0**	

Source: UEFA
Rules for classification: Qualification tiebreakers
(H) Hosts
12 October 2018
11:00 (12:00 EEST)

Northern Ireland	1–3	Greece
McGuinness 23'	Report	Pachaki 12'; Gilmore 55' (o.g.); Voila 66'

Zosimades Stadium, Ioannina
Referee: Vera Opeykina (Russia)
12 October 2018
14:00 (15:00 EEST)

Switzerland	5–0	Kazakhstan
Muino 19', 38'; Ljustina 44'; Granges 79'; Arni 90+1'	Report

Municipal Stadium of Kranoula, Ioannina
Referee: Ana Minić (Serbia)

15 October 2018
11:00 (12:00 EEST)

Greece	7–1	Kazakhstan
Voila 15', 57'; Papatheodorou 40', 74'; Prifti 63', 77'; Tsarantani 83'	Report	Burova 32' (pen.)

Zosimades Stadium, Ioannina
Referee: Vera Opeykina (Russia)
15 October 2018
14:00 (15:00 EEST)

Switzerland	1–1	Northern Ireland
Ljustina 49'	Report	McGuinness 6'

Municipal Stadium of Kranoula, Ioannina
Referee: Ainara Andrea Acevedo Dudley (Spain)

18 October 2018
11:00 (12:00 EEST)

Greece	2–1	Switzerland
Prifti 26'; Pachaki 90+4'	Report	Ess 64'

Municipal Stadium of Kranoula, Ioannina
Referee: Ainara Andrea Acevedo Dudley (Spain)
18 October 2018
11:00 (12:00 EEST)

Kazakhstan	0–5	Northern Ireland
	Report	Finnegan 44' (pen.), 48', 65' (pen.); Megaw 45+2'; Monteith 90+4'

Zosimades Stadium, Ioannina
Referee: Ana Minić (Serbia)

==== Group 10 ====
Pos	Team	Pld	W	D	L	GF	GA	GD	Pts	Qualification
1	France	3	3	0	0	16	1	+15	**9**	Elite round
2	Hungary	3	2	0	1	6	4	+2	**6**	Elite round
3	Bosnia and Herzegovina	3	1	0	2	7	7	0	**3**	
4	Macedonia (H)	3	0	0	3	1	18	−17	**0**	

Source: UEFA
Rules for classification: Qualification tiebreakers
(H) Hosts
20 September 2018
11:00

Bosnia and Herzegovina	0–1	Hungary
	Report	Pápai 31'

Training Centre Petar Miloševski (small stadium), Skopje
Referee: Sabayel Kuzuturk (Azerbaijan)
20 September 2018
15:30

France	7–0	Macedonia
Peneau 12', 23'; Picard 29', 51'; Joly 52', 80'; Chapelle 57'	Report

Training Centre Petar Miloševski, Skopje
Referee: Karoline Wacker (Germany)

23 September 2018
11:00

France	6–0	Bosnia and Herzegovina
Ben Rabah 33', 38'; Niaro 49'; Chapelle 66', 89'; Peneau 68'	Report

Training Centre Petar Miloševski (small stadium), Skopje
Referee: Anastasia Romanyuk (Ukraine)
23 September 2018
15:30

Hungary	4–1	Macedonia
V. Nagy 4'; Ploner 20'; Czellér 25', 47'	Report	Velkova 71'

Training Centre Petar Miloševski, Skopje
Referee: Sabayel Kuzuturk (Azerbaijan)

26 September 2018
15:30

Hungary	1–3	France
Zsédely 73'	Report	Picard 25', 90+1'; Peneau 53'

Training Centre Petar Miloševski, Skopje
Referee: Anastasia Romanyuk (Ukraine)
26 September 2018
15:30

Macedonia	0–7	Bosnia and Herzegovina
	Report	Krajnić 4', 33'; Husić 29'; Krajšumović 48', 62'; Latinčić 84'; Mujkić 86'

Training Centre Petar Miloševski (small stadium), Skopje
Referee: Karoline Wacker (Germany)

==== Group 11 ====
Pos	Team	Pld	W	D	L	GF	GA	GD	Pts	Qualification
1	Netherlands (H)	3	2	1	0	26	1	+25	**7**	Elite round
2	Sweden	3	1	2	0	13	2	+11	**5**	Elite round
3	Georgia	3	1	1	1	3	17	−14	**4**	Elite round
4	Latvia	3	0	0	3	0	22	−22	**0**	

Source: UEFA
Rules for classification: Qualification tiebreakers
(H) Hosts
17 October 2018
15:00

Latvia	0–11	Sweden
	Report	Saving 9'; Ekengren 10', 45+1', 66'; Johansson 15', 36'; Lindblom 16'; Lundkvist 19'; Koppang 53', 56', 78'

Sportpark Zegersloot, Alphen aan den Rijn
Attendance: 48
Referee: Tanja Racic (Bosnia and Herzegovina)
17 October 2018
19:00

Netherlands	16–0	Georgia
Foederer 20', 72', 77'; Brandau 22', 64'; Tromp 27', 33', 35' (pen.), 36', 55', 68' (pen.); Brugts 38'; Peddemors 60'; De Keijzer 70'; Abali 75'; Loonen 90+4'	Report

Sportpark Juliana, 's-Gravenzande
Attendance: 278
Referee: Tamara Petric (Serbia)

20 October 2018
13:00

Sweden	1–1	Georgia
Koppang 24'	Report	Tsotseria 78'

Sportpark Juliana, 's-Gravenzande
Attendance: 63
Referee: Tanja Racic (Bosnia and Herzegovina)
20 October 2018
17:00

Netherlands	9–0	Latvia
Brugts 10', 35', 43'; Stiekema 29'; Tromp 45', 48', 70', 82'; Hightower 45+1'	Report

Sportpark Zegersloot, Alphen aan den Rijn
Attendance: 403
Referee: Henrikke Nervik (Norway)

23 October 2018
19:00

Sweden	1–1	Netherlands
Johansson 41'	Report	Tromp 12'

Sportpark Juliana, 's-Gravenzande
Attendance: 352
Referee: Henrikke Nervik (Norway)
23 October 2018
19:00

Georgia	2–0	Latvia
Tsotseria 8'; Danelia 17'	Report

Sportpark Zegersloot, Alphen aan den Rijn
Attendance: 27
Referee: Tamara Petric (Serbia)

=== Ranking of third-placed teams ===
To determine the four best third-placed teams from the qualifying round which advance to the elite round, only the results of the third-placed teams against the first and second-placed teams in their group are taken into account.

Pos	Grp	Team	Pld	W	D	L	GF	GA	GD	Pts	Qualification
1	4	Slovakia	2	0	1	1	2	3	−1	1	Elite round
2	9	Northern Ireland	2	0	1	1	2	4	−2	1	Elite round
3	7	Wales	2	0	1	1	0	4	−4	1	Elite round
4	11	Georgia	2	0	1	1	1	17	−16	1	Elite round
5	8	Belarus	2	0	0	2	0	4	−4	0	
6	6	Turkey	2	0	0	2	1	6	−5	0	
7	2	Croatia	2	0	0	2	0	5	−5	0 (Note: Disciplinary points: Croatia 2, Romania 5.)	
8	3	Romania	2	0	0	2	0	5	−5	0	
9	1	Ukraine	2	0	0	2	0	6	−6	0	
10	10	Bosnia and Herzegovina	2	0	0	2	0	7	−7	0	
11	5	Azerbaijan	2	0	0	2	0	8	−8	0	

Source: UEFA
Rules for classification: 1) points; 2) goal difference; 3) goals scored; 4) disciplinary points; 5) coefficient; 6) drawing of lots.

== Elite round ==
=== Draw ===
The draw for the elite round was held on 23 November 2018, 11:40 CET (UTC+1), at the UEFA headquarters in Nyon, Switzerland.

The teams were seeded according to their results in the qualifying round. Germany and Spain, which received byes to the elite round, were automatically seeded into Pot A. Each group contained one team from Pot A, one team from Pot B, one team from Pot C, and one team from Pot D. Winners and runners-up from the same qualifying round group could not be drawn in the same group, but the best third-placed teams could be drawn in the same group as winners or runners-up from the same qualifying round group.

Pos	Grp	Team	Pld	W	D	L	GF	GA	GD	Pts	Seeding
1	—	Germany	0	0	0	0	0	0	0	0	Pot A
2	—	Spain	0	0	0	0	0	0	0	0	Pot A
3	10	France	3	3	0	0	16	1	+15	9	Pot A
4	5	England	3	3	0	0	15	0	+15	9	Pot A
5	1	Denmark	3	3	0	0	14	1	+13	9	Pot A
6	7	Serbia	3	3	0	0	13	0	+13	9	Pot A
7	6	Belgium	3	3	0	0	13	1	+12	9	Pot A
8	8	Austria	3	3	0	0	12	0	+12	9	Pot B
9	9	Greece	3	3	0	0	12	3	+9	9	Pot B
10	4	Poland	3	3	0	0	10	3	+7	9	Pot B
11	2	Norway	3	3	0	0	8	1	+7	9	Pot B
12	3	Italy	3	3	0	0	5	1	+4	9	Pot B
13	11	Netherlands	3	2	1	0	26	1	+25	7	Pot B
14	6	Portugal	3	2	0	1	15	3	+12	6	Pot B
15	2	Russia	3	2	0	1	7	2	+5	6 (Note: Disciplinary points: Russia 1, Iceland 3, Finland 6.)	Pot C
16	5	Iceland	3	2	0	1	7	2	+5	6	Pot C
17	3	Finland	3	2	0	1	7	2	+5	6	Pot C
18	1	Czech Republic	3	2	0	1	7	4	+3	6	Pot C
19	10	Hungary	3	2	0	1	6	4	+2	6	Pot C
20	11	Sweden	3	1	2	0	13	2	+11	5	Pot C
21	7	Republic of Ireland	3	1	1	1	14	1	+13	4	Pot C
22	9	Switzerland	3	1	1	1	7	3	+4	4	Pot D
23	9	Northern Ireland (Y)	3	1	1	1	7	4	+3	4	Pot D
24	7	Wales (Y)	3	1	1	1	2	4	−2	4 (Note: Disciplinary points: Wales 1, Scotland 2.)	Pot D
25	4	Scotland	3	1	1	1	2	4	−2	4	Pot D
26	11	Georgia (Y)	3	1	1	1	3	17	−14	4	Pot D
27	8	Slovenia	3	1	0	2	3	5	−2	3	Pot D
28	4	Slovakia (Y)	3	0	2	1	2	3	−1	2	Pot D

Source: UEFA
Rules for classification: 1) points; 2) goal difference; 3) goals scored; 4) disciplinary points; 5) coefficient; 6) drawing of lots.
(Y) Third-placed teams from qualifying round (may be drawn with teams from same qualifying round group)

=== Groups ===
The elite round was played in early April 2019.

Times are CET (UTC+1), as listed by UEFA (local times, if different, are in parentheses).

==== Group 1 ====
Pos	Team	Pld	W	D	L	GF	GA	GD	Pts	Qualification
1	England	3	3	0	0	13	0	+13	9	Final tournament
2	Hungary (H)	3	1	1	1	5	4	+1	4	
3	Greece	3	1	1	1	4	3	+1	4	
4	Georgia	3	0	0	3	0	15	−15	0	

Source: UEFA
Rules for classification: Qualification tiebreakers
(H) Hosts
21 March 2019
14:30

England	8–0	Georgia
Harries 25', 28'; Kadagishvili 34' (o.g.); Filis 38' (pen.); Stables 52'; Ware 66'; Dale 81'; May 90+3'	Report

Ménfői úti Stadion, Győr
Referee: Vera Onică (Moldova)
21 March 2019
18:00

Hungary	1–1	Greece
V. Nagy 24'	Report	Papatheodorou 1'

Ménfői úti Stadion, Győr
Referee: Yuliya Larionova (Azerbaijan)

24 March 2019
12:45

England	3–0	Hungary
Dale 29', 32'; Stables 48'	Report

Ménfői úti Stadion, Győr
Referee: María Dolores Martinez Madrona (Spain)
24 March 2019
16:15

Greece	3–0	Georgia
Papatheodorou 5'; Pachaki 38'; Prifti 44'	Report

Ménfői úti Stadion, Győr
Referee: Yuliya Larionova (Azerbaijan)

27 March 2019
15:00

Greece	0–2	England
	Report	Grant 24'; Filis 51' (pen.)

Perutz Stadion, Pápa
Referee: María Dolores Martinez Madrona (Spain)
27 March 2019
15:00

Georgia	0–4	Hungary
	Report	Bokor 51'; Papp 55' (pen.); Czellér 64'; Pápai 89'

Ménfői úti Stadion, Győr
Referee: Vera Onică (Moldova)

==== Group 2 ====
Pos	Team	Pld	W	D	L	GF	GA	GD	Pts	Qualification
1	Netherlands	3	2	1	0	9	0	+9	7	Final tournament
2	Switzerland	3	2	0	1	7	10	−3	6	
3	Serbia (H)	3	1	1	1	6	4	+2	4	
4	Russia	3	0	0	3	3	11	−8	0	

Source: UEFA
Rules for classification: Qualification tiebreakers
(H) Hosts
10 March 2019
12:00

Russia	0–3	Netherlands
	Report	Peddemors 25'; Brugts 52'; Loonen 90+4'

Sports Center of FA of Serbia, Stara Pazova
Referee: Veronika Kovarova (Czech Republic)
10 March 2019
17:00

Serbia	2–3	Switzerland
Barjaktarović 31'; Petrović 66' (pen.)	Report	Ljustina 24'; Iseni 60', 63'

Sports Center of FA of Serbia, Stara Pazova
Referee: Zulema Gonzalez Gonzalez (Spain)

13 March 2019
12:00

Netherlands	6–0	Switzerland
Tromp 17'; Abali 23', 42'; Brandau 50'; De Keijzer 65'; Hulswit 90+2'	Report

Sports Center of FA of Serbia, Stara Pazova
Referee: Veronika Kovarova (Czech Republic)
13 March 2019
17:00

Serbia	4–1	Russia
Tanasković 5', 59', 78'; Petrović 58' (pen.)	Report	Tchato 85'

Sports Center of FA of Serbia, Stara Pazova
Referee: Galiya Echeva (Bulgaria)

16 March 2019
14:00

Netherlands	0–0	Serbia
	Report

Sports Center of FA of Serbia, Stara Pazova
Referee: Galiya Echeva (Bulgaria)
16 March 2019
14:00

Switzerland	4–2	Russia
Iseni 16', 90+2'; Kulakova 40' (o.g.); Kadriu 62' (pen.)	Report	Trenkina 68'; Lazareva 84'

Sports Center of FA of Serbia pitch 4, Stara Pazova
Referee: Zulema Gonzalez Gonzalez (Spain)

==== Group 3 ====
Pos	Team	Pld	W	D	L	GF	GA	GD	Pts	Qualification
1	Spain	3	3	0	0	9	0	+9	9	Final tournament
2	Poland	3	2	0	1	3	3	0	6	
3	Sweden (H)	3	1	0	2	1	3	−2	3	
4	Slovakia	3	0	0	3	0	7	−7	0	

Source: UEFA
Rules for classification: Qualification tiebreakers
(H) Hosts
23 March 2019
16:30

Sweden	0–2	Poland
	Report	Kozak 54'; Zieniewicz 73'

Borås Arena, Borås
Referee: Iuliana Demetrescu (Romania)
23 March 2019
19:30

Spain	5–0	Slovakia
Carrillo 2', 10', 35'; Paralluelo 32', 90'	Report

Borås Arena, Borås
Referee: Abigail Marriott (England)

26 March 2019
15:30

Poland	1–0	Slovakia
Bińkowska 19'	Report

Borås Arena, Borås
Referee: Iuliana Demetrescu (Romania)
26 March 2019
18:30

Spain	1–0	Sweden
Carrillo 45'	Report

Borås Arena, Borås
Referee: Irena Velevačkoska (Macedonia)

29 March 2019
18:00

Poland	0–3	Spain
	Report	Paralluelo 25'; Carrillo 45+1', 55'

Bravida Arena, Gothenburg
Referee: Irena Velevačkoska (Macedonia)
29 March 2019
18:00

Slovakia	0–1	Sweden
	Report	Duljan 12'

Borås Arena, Borås
Referee: Abigail Marriott (England)

==== Group 4 ====
Pos	Team	Pld	W	D	L	GF	GA	GD	Pts	Qualification
1	Germany	3	3	0	0	11	0	+11	9	Final tournament
2	Republic of Ireland	3	1	1	1	2	3	−1	4	
3	Norway	3	1	1	1	2	5	−3	4	
4	Scotland (H)	3	0	0	3	0	7	−7	0	

Source: UEFA
Rules for classification: Qualification tiebreakers
(H) Hosts
20 March 2019
14:00 (13:00 GMT)

Germany	5–0	Scotland
Weidauer 11', 49'; Woldmann 31'; Wamser 32'; Pollak 38'	Report

Oriam Indoor, Edinburgh
Referee: Briet Bragadottir (Iceland)
20 March 2019
18:30 (17:30 GMT)

Republic of Ireland	1–1	Norway
Cooke 70'	Report	Revees 72' (pen.)

Oriam Indoor, Edinburgh
Referee: Andromachi Tsiofliki (Greece)

23 March 2019
13:00 (12:00 GMT)

Germany	2–0	Republic of Ireland
Woldmann 34'; Kowalski 62'	Report

Oriam Indoor, Edinburgh
Referee: Ifeoma Kulmala (Finland)
23 March 2019
17:30 (16:30 GMT)

Norway	1–0	Scotland
Haugen 76'	Report

Oriam Indoor, Edinburgh
Referee: Andromachi Tsiofliki (Greece)

26 March 2019
15:30 (14:30 GMT)

Norway	0–4	Germany
	Report	Kowalski 39'; Weidauer 73'; Fetaj 90'; Brand 90+4'

Oriam Outdoor, Edinburgh
Referee: Ifeoma Kulmala (Finland)
26 March 2019
15:30 (14:30 GMT)

Scotland	0–1	Republic of Ireland
	Report	Kingsley 32'

Ainslie Park, Edinburgh
Referee: Briet Bragadottir (Iceland)

==== Group 5 ====
Pos	Team	Pld	W	D	L	GF	GA	GD	Pts	Qualification
1	Portugal (H)	3	3	0	0	8	0	+8	9	Final tournament
2	France	3	2	0	1	7	1	+6	6	
3	Czech Republic	3	1	0	2	2	4	−2	3	
4	Northern Ireland	3	0	0	3	1	13	−12	0	

Source: UEFA
Rules for classification: Qualification tiebreakers
(H) Hosts
23 March 2019
16:00 (15:00 WET)

France	5–0	Northern Ireland
Ben Rabah 7' (pen.), 16', 22', 42'; Becho 32'	Report

Estádio Municipal Carlos Duarte, Pampilhosa
Referee: Maria Sole Caputi (Italy)
23 March 2019
18:00 (17:00 WET)

Czech Republic	0–1	Portugal
	Report	Negrão 32'

Centro de Treino, Luso
Referee: Tinna Høj Christensen (Denmark)

26 March 2019
16:00 (15:00 WET)

France	2–0	Czech Republic
Becho 4'; Ould Hocine 79'	Report

Centro de Treino, Luso
Referee: Laura Rapp (Sweden)
26 March 2019
18:00 (17:00 WET)

Portugal	6–0	Northern Ireland
Nazareth 1', 45+1'; Pintassilgo 42'; Ferreira 56'; Silva 89' (pen.); Negrão 90+5'	Report

Estádio Municipal Carlos Duarte, Pampilhosa
Referee: Tinna Høj Christensen (Denmark)

29 March 2019
17:00 (16:00 WET)

Portugal	1–0	France
Pintassilgo 5'	Report

Centro de Treino, Luso
Referee: Laura Rapp (Sweden)
29 March 2019
17:00 (16:00 WET)

Northern Ireland	1–2	Czech Republic
McGuinness 46'	Report	Hilbertová 32'; Holá 65'

Estádio Municipal Dr. Américo Couto, Mealhada
Referee: Maria Sole Caputi (Italy)

==== Group 6 ====
Pos	Team	Pld	W	D	L	GF	GA	GD	Pts	Qualification
1	Denmark	3	2	1	0	8	1	+7	7	Final tournament
2	Slovenia	3	1	1	1	2	3	−1	4	
3	Iceland	3	1	0	2	2	4	−2	3 (Note: Head-to-head result: Iceland 2–1 Italy.)	
4	Italy (H)	3	1	0	2	3	7	−4	3	

Source: UEFA
Rules for classification: Qualification tiebreakers
(H) Hosts
Notes:
21 March 2019
11:00

Iceland	2–1	Italy
Beretta 42' (o.g.); Benediktsdóttir 88'	Report	Giordano 52'

Centro Sportivo Giovanni Bui, San Giuliano Terme
Referee: Reelika Turi (Estonia)
21 March 2019
15:00

Denmark	1–1	Slovenia
Frederiksen 7'	Report	Suhoveršnik 11'

Stadio Comunale Germano Bellucci, Agliana
Referee: Emanuela Rusta (Albania)

24 March 2019
11:00

Denmark	2–0	Iceland
M. Carstens 35'; Kramer 67'	Report

Centro Sportivo Giovanni Bui, San Giuliano Terme
Referee: Sabina Bolić (Croatia)
24 March 2019
15:00

Italy	2–0	Slovenia
Giordano 12'; Catelli 67'	Report

Stadio Comunale Germano Bellucci, Agliana
Referee: Reelika Turi (Estonia)

27 March 2019
15:00

Italy	0–5	Denmark
	Report	Lundgaard 42', 83'; Kramer 60', 68'; Rasmunssen 88'

Stadio Marcello Melani, Pistoia
Referee: Sabina Bolić (Croatia)
27 March 2019
15:00

Slovenia	1–0	Iceland
Suhoveršnik 78'	Report

Centro Sportivo Giovanni Bui, San Giuliano Terme
Referee: Emanuela Rusta (Albania)

==== Group 7 ====
Pos	Team	Pld	W	D	L	GF	GA	GD	Pts	Qualification
1	Austria (H)	3	2	1	0	8	3	+5	7	Final tournament
2	Belgium	3	2	0	1	7	4	+3	6	
3	Finland	3	1	1	1	6	2	+4	4	
4	Wales	3	0	0	3	0	12	−12	0	

Source: UEFA
Rules for classification: Qualification tiebreakers
(H) Hosts
24 March 2019
15:00

Finland	1–1	Austria
Koivisto 11' (pen.)	Report	Purtscheller 41'

Informstadion, Oberwart
Referee: Alina Peşu (Romania)
24 March 2019
17:30

Belgium	4–0	Wales
Wils 13'; Lemmens 54'; Eurlings 64'; Buyle 86'	Report

Stadion Stegersbach, Stegersbach
Referee: Jelena Cvetković (Serbia)

27 March 2019
15:00

Belgium	1–0	Finland
Wils 90+4'	Report

Informstadion, Oberwart
Referee: Rasa Imanalijeva (Lithuania)
27 March 2019
18:00

Austria	3–0	Wales
Croatto 4'; Wienerroither 31'; Schasching 73' (pen.)	Report

Stadion Stegersbach, Stegersbach
Referee: Alina Peşu (Romania)

30 March 2019
15:00

Austria	4–2	Belgium
Schasching 45+1' (pen.), 61'; Purtscheller 90+1'; Wienerroither 90+2'	Report	Janssens 36'; Dellaert 42'

Stadion Stegersbach, Stegersbach
Referee: Rasa Imanalijeva (Lithuania)
30 March 2019
15:00

Wales	0–5	Finland
	Report	Karjalainen 28', 31'; Salminen 76', 90'; Simonen 83'

Informstadion, Oberwart
Referee: Jelena Cvetković (Serbia)

== Qualified teams ==
The following eight teams qualify for the final tournament.

Team	Qualified as	Qualified on	Previous appearances in Women's Under-17 Euro^{1}
Bulgaria	Hosts	9 December 2016	0 (debut)
England	Elite round Group 1 winners	27 March 2019	6 (2008, 2014, 2015, 2016, 2017, 2018)
Netherlands	Elite round Group 2 winners	16 March 2019	3 (2010, 2017, 2018)
Spain	Elite round Group 3 winners	29 March 2019	9 (2009, **2010**, **2011**, 2013, 2014, **2015**, 2016, 2017, **2018**)
Germany	Elite round Group 4 winners	26 March 2019	10 (**2008**, **2009**, 2010, 2011, **2012**, **2014**, 2015, **2016**, **2017**, 2018)
Portugal	Elite round Group 5 winners	29 March 2019	1 (2014)
Denmark	Elite round Group 6 winners	27 March 2019	2 (2008, 2012)
Austria	Elite round Group 7 winners	30 March 2019	1 (2014)

^{1} Bold indicates champions for that year. Italic indicates hosts for that year.

== Goalscorers ==
In the qualifying round there were 278 goals scored in 66 matches, for an average of 4.21 goals per match. In the elite round there were 129 goals scored in 42 matches, for an average of 3.07 goals per match. In total, there were 407 goals scored in 108 matches, for an average of 3.77 goals per match.

12 goals

- (Netherlands) Nikita Tromp

9 goals

- (Denmark) Cornelia Kramer

7 goals

- (Portugal) Maria Negrão
- (Serbia) Krstina Tanasković

6 goals

- (Austria) Annabel Schasching
- (England) Melisa Filis
- (France) Cyrine Ben Rabah
- (Spain) Sara Carrillo

5 goals

- (Netherlands) Esmee Brugts
- (Portugal) Francisca Nazareth
- (Serbia) Emilija Ema Petrović

4 goals

- (Austria) Lilli Purtscheller
- (Denmark) Sofie Lundgaard
- (England) Fran Stables
- (France) Leila Peneau
- (France) Océane Picard
- (Greece) Ioanna Papatheodorou
- (Greece) Loukia Prifti
- (Republic of Ireland) Emily Kraft
- (Poland) Kinga Kozak
- (Slovenia) Manca Suhoveršnik
- (Sweden) Nina Koppang
- (Switzerland) Ardita Iseni

3 goals

- (Austria) Katja Wienerroither
- (Belgium) Welma Fon
- (Belgium) Jarne Teulings
- (Czech Republic) Andrea Holá
- (Denmark) Rebekka Frost Frederiksen
- (England) Eleanor Dale
- (England) Ruby Grant
- (England) Katie Robinson
- (France) Kenza Chapelle
- (Finland) Ria Karjalainen
- (Finland) Aada Nurmi
- (Germany) Sophie Weidauer
- (Greece) Ioanna Pachaki
- (Greece) Chrysanthi Voila
- (Hungary) Dorottya Czellér
- (Iceland) Clara Sigurðardóttir
- (Netherlands) Ilham Abali
- (Netherlands) Justine Brandau
- (Netherlands) Dana Foederer
- (Northern Ireland) Toni Leigh Finnegan
- (Northern Ireland) Caitlin McGuinness
- (Norway) Joshualyn Favour Revees
- (Portugal) Ana Albuquerque
- (Republic of Ireland) Emily Whelan
- (Serbia) Anastasija Ćirić
- (Spain) Salma Paralluelo
- (Sweden) Hanna Ekengren
- (Sweden) Stinalisa Johansson
- (Switzerland) Ella Ljustina

2 goals

- (Austria) Patricia Pfanner
- (Austria) Laura Wurzer
- (Belgium) Geena-Lisa Buyle
- (Belgium) Jill Janssens
- (Belgium) Tine Lemmens
- (Belgium) Tess Wils
- (Bosnia and Herzegovina) Alma Krajnić
- (Bosnia and Herzegovina) Sofija Krajšumović
- (Czech Republic) Kateřina Marcinková
- (Czech Republic) Aneta Sováková
- (Denmark) Mathilde Carstens
- (England) Isobel Goodwin
- (England) Emma Harries
- (Finland) Wilma Forsblom
- (Finland) Niia Salminen
- (France) Vicki Becho
- (France) Lou Ann Joly
- (Georgia (country)) Natela Tsotseria
- (Germany) Natasha Kowalski
- (Germany) Nicole Woldmann
- (Hungary) Vanessza Nagy
- (Hungary) Emőke Pápai
- (Italy) Federica Anghileri
- (Italy) Veronica Battelani
- (Italy) Michela Giordano
- (Netherlands) Lot de Keijzer
- (Netherlands) Lobke Loonen
- (Netherlands) Ella Peddemors
- (Norway) Mille Aune
- (Poland) Adriana Achcińska
- (Poland) Paulina Tomasiak
- (Poland) Wiktoria Zieniewicz
- (Portugal) Andreia Jacinto
- (Portugal) Luana Marques
- (Portugal) Lara Pintassilgo
- (Republic of Ireland) Katelyn Keogh
- (Republic of Ireland) Eabha O'Mahony
- (Republic of Ireland) Jessica Ziu
- (Russia) Zhoze-Diana Pamen Tchato
- (Russia) Natalya Trofimova
- (Russia) Tatyana Voronko
- (Switzerland) Maeva Muino
- (Turkey) Mesude Alayont

1 goal

- (Austria) Michela Croatto
- (Austria) Julia Magerl
- (Austria) Ines Gabriela Sarac
- (Azerbaijan) Seval Cakan
- (Belarus) Natalya Asmykovich
- (Belarus) Valeriya Kharitonchik
- (Belgium) Cato Dellaert
- (Belgium) Hannah Eurlings
- (Belgium) Sterre Gielen
- (Belgium) Liesbeth Maes
- (Belgium) Luna Vanzeir
- (Bosnia and Herzegovina) Elma Husić
- (Bosnia and Herzegovina) Natascha Latinčić
- (Bosnia and Herzegovina) Fadila Mujkić
- (Croatia) Nika Petarić
- (Czech Republic) Jennifer Hilbertová
- (Czech Republic) Kristýna Růžičková
- (Denmark) Sofie Bredgaard
- (Denmark) Cecilie Nielsen
- (Denmark) Matilde Rasmussen
- (England) Eleanor Hack
- (England) Rebecca May
- (England) Alisha Ware
- (Estonia) Kadri Reinik
- (Faroe Islands) Silja Augustinussen
- (Faroe Islands) Fridrikka Klementsen
- (Faroe Islands) Lea Lisberg
- (Finland) Ilona Anttonen
- (Finland) Vilma Koivisto
- (Finland) Anna-Stina Simonen
- (France) Esther Mbakem Niaro
- (France) Célina Ould Hocine
- (Georgia (country)) Natia Danelia
- (Germany) Jule Brand
- (Germany) Gentiana Fetaj
- (Germany) Julia Pollak
- (Germany) Carlotta Wamser
- (Greece) Aikaterini Tsarantani
- (Hungary) Blanka Bokor
- (Hungary) Luca Papp
- (Hungary) Szandra Ploner
- (Hungary) Réka Zsédely
- (Iceland) Hildigunnur Ýr Benediktsdóttir
- (Iceland) Ída Marín Hermannsdóttir
- (Iceland) María Catharina Ólafsdóttir Gros
- (Iceland) Andrea Marý Sigurjónsdóttir
- (Iceland) Þórhildur Þórhallsdóttir
- (Italy) Anna Catelli
- (Italy) Heden Corrado
- (Kazakhstan) Alexandra Burova
- (Lithuania) Rimantė Jonušaitė
- (Lithuania) Judita Sabatauskaitė
- (North Macedonia) Sara Velkova
- (Moldova) Stela-Aleina Tez
- (Montenegro) Jelena Karličić
- (Netherlands) Anna Hightower
- (Netherlands) Zera Hulswit
- (Netherlands) Iris Stiekema
- (Northern Ireland) Sophie Megaw
- (Northern Ireland) Breckyn Monteith
- (Norway) Oda Åmland Edvartsen
- (Norway) Malene Oland Haugen
- (Norway) Gina Øgegaard
- (Norway) Emilie Libakken Østerås
- (Poland) Amelia Bińkowska
- (Poland) Wiktoria Kiszkis
- (Poland) Natalia Padilla
- (Portugal) Marta Ferreira
- (Portugal) Sofia Silva
- (Republic of Ireland) Rebecca Cooke
- (Republic of Ireland) Mia Dodd
- (Republic of Ireland) Blessing Kingsley
- (Romania) Roberta Dimulescu
- (Romania) Claudia Pana
- (Russia) Anastasiya Fetisova
- (Russia) Elizaveta Lazareva
- (Russia) Anastasiya Trenkina
- (Russia) Polina Yuklyaeva
- (Scotland) Aisha Maughan
- (Scotland) Kathleen Mcgovern
- (Serbia) Ana Barjaktarović
- (Serbia) Mina Čavić
- (Serbia) Helena Host
- (Serbia) Margita Vasović
- (Slovakia) Nikol Mazúchová
- (Slovakia) Tamara Morávková
- (Slovenia) Zala Igerc
- (Sweden) Evelina Duljan
- (Sweden) Johanna Lindblom
- (Sweden) Hanna Lundkvist
- (Sweden) Felicia Saving
- (Switzerland) Anna Sophie Arni
- (Switzerland) Géraldine Delphine Ess
- (Switzerland) Malaurie Karine Granges
- (Switzerland) Yllka Kadriu
- (Turkey) Berivan Içen
- (Turkey) Ece Tekmen
- (Ukraine) Alina Godunko
- (Ukraine) Oleksandra Krevska
- (Ukraine) Liudmyla Kunina
- (Ukraine) Nadiia Salivonchyk
- (Wales) Zoe Collyer
- (Wales) Josie Longhurst

1 own goal

- (Andorra) Laura Borja Martín (against Belgium)
- (Azerbaijan) Parvin Safaraliyeva (against England)
- (Faroe Islands) Jacoba Neshamar (against Denmark)
- (Georgia (country)) Gvantsa Kadagishvili (against England)
- (Israel) Irena Kuznezov (against Norway)
- (Italy) Beatrice Beretta (against Iceland)
- (Italy) Martina Di Bari (against Montenegro)
- (Northern Ireland) Libby Gilmore (against Greece)
- (Russia) Anastasiya Kulakova (against Switzerland)

Source: UEFA.com
