= 2023–24 Middlesbrough F.C. Women season =

Middlesbrough
2023–24 season
- Chairman: Steve Gibson
- Manager: Michael Mulhern
- Stadium: Bishopton Road West; Riverside Stadium
- Division One North: 2nd
- FA Cup: Third qualifying round
- WNL Cup: Determining round
- WNL Plate: First round
- Top goalscorer: League: Jessica Mett (9); All: Jessica Mett; Lauren Robson (9)
- Highest home attendance: 2,177 (vs. Stockport County, 17 September 2023)
- Lowest home attendance: 213 (vs. Barnsley, 11 February 2024)
- Average home league attendance: 659
- Biggest win: 6–0 (vs. United of Manchester, 5 November 2023)
- Biggest defeat: 1–4 (vs. Hull City, 3 September 2023)
Home colours	Away colours	Third colours

The 2023–24 season was the 48th season of competitive football in the history of Middlesbrough Football Club Women, their first since affiliation with the men's team, and their second consecutive season in the FA Women's National League Division One North, the fourth level of English women's football. The club also participated in the Women's FA Cup, the FA WNL Cup, and the FA WNL Plate.

Coinciding with affiliation, Michael Mulhern was announced as manager on 26 May 2023. The season also marked the debut of the woman's team at the Riverside Stadium, a 0–0 draw against Stockport County on 17 September. The club recorded their first win at the stadium on 10 March 2024, a 5–0 win against Doncaster Rovers.

== Squad ==
As of 10 October 2023.

Note: Flags indicate national team as defined under FIFA eligibility rules; some limited exceptions apply. Players may hold more than one non-FIFA nationality.

No.	Pos.	Nation	Player
1	GK	ENG	Laura Wareham
2	DF	ENG	Jane Harland
3	DF	ENG	Emma Wallis
4	MF	ENG	Bethany Guy
5	DF	ENG	Ellen Packham
6	DF	ENG	Abby Towers
7	FW	ENG	Ellen Turnbull
8	FW	ENG	Jessica Mett
9	FW	ENG	Armani Maxwell
10	MF	ENG	Lauren Robson
11	FW	ENG	Ella Baker
12	MF	ENG	Eve Marshall

No.	Pos.	Nation	Player
13	GK	ENG	Ruby Cook
14	DF	ENG	Emma Foster
16	MF	ENG	Francesca Ward
17	DF	ENG	Millie Bell
18	MF	ENG	Sarah Burn (captain)
19	FW	USA	Jolie Donzo
20	DF	ENG	Rose McCarthy
21	FW	ENG	Faye Dale
22	DF	ENG	Daisy Burt (on loan from Newcastle United)
23	FW	ENG	Nicole Havery
24	MF	ENG	Michelle Brogden
25	FW	ENG	Katie Ormerod

== Transfers ==
=== In ===
Date	Position	Nationality	Name	From	Ref.
7 July 2023	DF	(England)	Abby Towers	(England) Sunderland	
9 July 2023	MF	(England)	Sarah Burn	(England) Durham Cestria	
9 July 2023	MF	(England)	Beth Guy	(England) Newcastle United	
10 July 2023	DF	(England)	Ellen Packham	(England) Newcastle United	
10 July 2023	DF	(England)	Emma Wallis	(England) Newcastle United	
10 July 2023	DF	(England)	Rachel Hindle	(England) Leeds United	
11 July 2023	DF	(England)	Millie Bell	(England) Newcastle United	
11 July 2023	DF	(England)	Jane Harland	(England) Newcastle United	
12 July 2023	DF	(England)	Rose McCarthy	(England) Teesside RTC	
12 July 2023	FW	(England)	Ella Baker	(England) Teesside RTC	
27 July 2023	FW	(England)	Ellen Turnbull	(England) Durham Cestria	
1 August 2023	MF	(England)	Lauren Robson	(England) Newcastle United	
30 August 2023	FW	(United States)	Jolie Donzo	(England) Durham Cestria	
21 September 2023	FW	(England)	Nicole Havery	(England) Chester-le-Street Town	
10 October 2023	FW	(England)	Katie Ormerod	(England) Norton & Stockton Ancients	
14 January 2024	MF	(England)	Michelle Brogden	(United States) Concord Mountain Lions	
29 January 2024	FW	(England)	Faye Dale	(England) Durham Cestria	

=== Loans in ===
Date	Position	Nationality	Name	From	Until	Ref.
19 February 2024	DF	(England)	Daisy Burt	(England) Newcastle United	End of season	

== Competitions ==
=== Division One North ===
==== League table ====
Pos	Team	Pld	W	D	L	GF	GA	GD	Pts	Qualification
1	Hull City (C, P)	22	17	2	3	63	24	+39	53	Promotion to the Northern Premier Division
2	Middlesbrough	22	13	7	2	45	21	+24	46	
3	Durham Cestria	22	13	4	5	41	16	+25	43	
4	Barnsley	22	13	4	5	50	27	+23	43	
5	Stockport County	22	9	8	5	33	22	+11	35	

Updated to match(es) played on 5 May 2024. Source:
Rules for classification: 1) Points; 2) Goal difference; 3) Number of goals scored
(C) Champions; (P) Promoted

==== Results summary ====
Overall								Home						Away					
Pld	W	D	L	GF	GA	GD	Pts	W	D	L	GF	GA	GD	W	D	L	GF	GA	GD
22	13	7	2	45	21	+24	46	7	3	1	24	6	+18	6	4	1	21	15	+6

Last updated: 5 May 2024.
Source: FA WNL Division 1 North

==== Results by round ====
Matchday	1	2	3	4	5	6	7	8	9	10	11	12	13	14	15	16	17	18	19	20	21	22
Ground	H	A	H	A	H	A	A	H	H	A	H	H	A	A	H	A	H	A	H	A	A	H
Result	D	L	W	W	D	D	W	W	W	D	W	W	W	W	D	D	W	W	W	W	D	L
Position	6	9	5	4	4	4	4	4	2	3	3	3	2	1	1	1	1	1	1	1	2	2

Source: FA WNL Division 1 North
A = Away; H = Home; W = Win; D = Draw; L = Loss

==== Matches ====
The FA Women's National League fixtures were released on 17 July.

20 August 2023 1	Middlesbrough	0–0	Norton & Stockton Ancients	Stockton
15:00 BST		Report	White (yellow card) 58'	Stadium: Bishopton Road West

3 September 2023 2	Hull City	4–1	Middlesbrough	Barton
14:00 BST	Lynskey 13', 62', 90+4'; Knight 70' (pen.)	Report	Guy 18'	Stadium: Easy Buy Stadium

6 September 2023 3	Middlesbrough	1–0	Durham Cestria	Redcar
19:45 BST	Towers 42'	Report	Forster (yellow card) 90+1'	Stadium: Green Lane Stadium

10 September 2023 4	Leeds United	0–1	Middlesbrough	Garforth
14:00 BST		Report	Packham 18'	Stadium: Bannister Prentice Stadium

17 September 2023 5	Middlesbrough	0–0	Stockport County	Middlesbrough
14:00 BST		Report	Houghton (yellow card) 56'	Stadium: Riverside Stadium; Attendance: 2,177

24 September 2023 6	Barnsley	0–0	Middlesbrough	Barnsley
14:00 BST		Report		Stadium: Houghton Main

8 October 2023 7	Doncaster Rovers	1–4	Middlesbrough	Doncaster
14:00 BST	Willoughby 74'	Report	Havery 32'; Mett 53', 66'; Turnbull 86'	Stadium: Eco-Power Stadium

11 October 2023 8	Middlesbrough	1–0	Chester-le-Street	Stockton
19:45 BST	Marshall 21'	Report		Stadium: Bishopton Road West

5 November 2023 9	Middlesbrough	6–0	F.C. United of Manchester	Stockton
14:00 GMT	Robson 8', 59', 85'; Turnbull 41', 61'; Burn 55' (pen.)	Report		Stadium: Bishopton Road West

17 December 2023 10	Chorley	1–1	Middlesbrough	Chorley
14:00 GMT	Newhouse 44'	Report	Mett 50'	Stadium: Blainscough Park
Note: Fixture originally scheduled for 29 October 2023.

7 January 2024 11	Middlesbrough	2–0	Hull City	Stockton
14:00 GMT	Turnbull 14'; Towers 43'	Report		Stadium: Bishopton Road West

14 January 2024 12	Middlesbrough	3–1	Leeds United	Stockton
14:00 GMT	Robson 4'; Mett 54'; Burn 85' (pen.)	Report	Rousseau 21'	Stadium: Bishopton Road West

21 January 2024 13	Stockport County	1–3	Middlesbrough	Stockport
14:00 GMT	Davies 5'	Report	Robson 49'; Havery 60'; Mett 81'	Stadium: Stockport Sports Village

4 February 2024 14	York City	2–3	Middlesbrough	York
14:00 GMT	Hemmings 37'; Singleton 54'	Report	Turnbull 14'; Havery 29'; Mett 85'	Stadium: York Sports Stadium
Note: Fixture originally scheduled for 3 December 2023.

11 February 2024 15	Middlesbrough	3–3	Barnsley	Stockton
14:00 GMT	Havery 45'; Mett 52'; Marshall 81'	Report	Beck 12'; Harland 32' (o.g.); Pierrepont 43'	Stadium: Bishopton Road West

21 February 2024 16	Durham Cestria	0–0	Middlesbrough	Bishop Auckland
19:45 GMT		Report		Stadium: Heritage Park

10 March 2024 17	Middlesbrough	5–0	Doncaster Rovers	Middlesbrough
14:00 GMT	Turnbull 5', 90'; Packham 19'; Burn 24' (pen.); Mett 40'	Report		Stadium: Riverside Stadium; Attendance: 1,651

13 March 2024 18	Chester-le-Street	2–3	Middlesbrough	Chester-le-Street
19:45 GMT	Ashton 24'; Jackson 90'	Report	Havery 44'; Mett 59'; Dale 66'	Stadium: Moor Park

24 March 2024 19	Middlesbrough	3–0	Chorley	Stockton
14:00 GMT	Havery 2', 32'; Turnbull 81'	Report		Stadium: Bishopton Road West

31 March 2024 20	F.C. United of Manchester	1–2	Middlesbrough	Manchester
14:00 GMT	Gordon 20'	Report	Robson 5'; Burn 32'	Stadium: Broadhurst Park

21 April 2024 21	Norton & Stockton Ancients	3–3	Middlesbrough	Stockton
14:00 BST	Milne-Redhead 21'; Owens 69'; Boyle 78'	Report	Robson 63', 83'; Dale 90'	Stadium: Norton Sports Complex

5 May 2024 22	Middlesbrough	0–2	York City	Stockton
14:00 BST		Report	Holder 55' (pen.); Rolandsen 82'	Stadium: Bishopton Road West

=== FA Cup ===
22 October 2023 Third qualifying round	Middlesbrough	0–0 (2–4 p)	Hull City	Stockton
14:00 BST		Report		Stadium: Bishopton Road West
	Penalties
	Towers (penalty missed); Wallis (penalty scored); Donzo (penalty scored); Mett (penalty missed)		(penalty scored) Tanser; (penalty scored) Hunt; (penalty missed) Watters; (penalty scored) Thompson; (penalty scored) Knight

=== WNL Cup ===
27 August 2023 Determining round	Huddersfield Town	5–3	Middlesbrough	Huddersfield
14:00 BST	Abdullahi 3', 80'; Nsangou 28'; O’Connor 51'; Sanderson 72'	Report	Robson 42'; Donzo 63'; Ward 88'	Stadium: Stafflex Arena

=== WNL Plate ===
1 October 2023 First round	Sutton Coldfield Town	3–1	Middlesbrough	Sutton Coldfield
14:00 BST	Jeffries 1', 68', (yellow card) 87'; Woolston 31'; Finn (yellow card) 37'	Report	Marshall 38'	Stadium: Central Ground

== Statistics ==
=== Appearances and goals ===
As of 5 May 2024

Starting appearances are listed first, followed by substitute appearances after the + symbol where applicable.

No.	Pos	Nat	Player	Total		D1N		FA Cup		WNL Cup		WNL Plate	
No.	Pos	Nat	Player	Apps	Goals	Apps	Goals	Apps	Goals	Apps	Goals	Apps	Goals
Goalkeepers
1	GK	(England) ENG	Laura Wareham	23	0	21	0	1	0	1	0	0	0
13	GK	(England) ENG	Ruby Cook	6	0	1+3	0	0	0	0+1	0	1	0
Defenders
2	DF	(England) ENG	Jane Harland	14	0	11+1	0	1	0	0	0	1	0
3	DF	(England) ENG	Emma Wallis	11	0	7+1	0	1	0	1	0	1	0
5	DF	(England) ENG	Ellen Packham	25	2	22	2	1	0	1	0	1	0
6	DF	(England) ENG	Abby Towers	23	2	20	2	1	0	1	0	1	0
14	DF	(England) ENG	Emma Foster	13	0	9+3	0	0	0	0+1	0	0	0
17	DF	(England) ENG	Millie Bell	18	0	12+4	0	0	0	1	0	0+1	0
20	DF	(England) ENG	Rose McCarthy	9	0	4+4	0	0	0	0	0	0+1	0
22	DF	(England) ENG	Daisy Burt	7	0	7	0	0	0	0	0	0	0
Midfielders
4	MF	(England) ENG	Bethany Guy	18	1	15+1	1	1	0	0+1	0	0	0
10	MF	(England) ENG	Lauren Robson	24	9	20+1	8	1	0	1	1	1	0
12	MF	(England) ENG	Eve Marshall	18	3	6+9	2	1	0	1	0	1	1
16	MF	(England) ENG	Francesca Ward	6	1	3+1	0	0	0	0+1	1	1	0
18	MF	(England) ENG	Sarah Burn	25	4	22	4	1	0	1	0	1	0
24	MF	(England) ENG	Michelle Brogden	2	0	0+2	0	0	0	0	0	0	0
Forwards
7	FW	(England) ENG	Ellen Turnbull	25	8	22	8	1	0	1	0	1	0
8	FW	(England) ENG	Jessica Mett	18	9	16	9	0+1	0	0	0	0+1	0
9	FW	(England) ENG	Armani Maxwell	7	0	2+5	0	0	0	0	0	0	0
11	FW	(England) ENG	Ella Baker	8	0	2+4	0	0	0	1	0	0+1	0
21	FW	(England) ENG	Faye Dale	6	2	2+4	2	0	0	0	0	0	0
23	FW	(England) ENG	Nicole Havery	17	7	13+2	7	1	0	0	0	1	0
25	FW	(England) ENG	Katie Ormerod	2	0	0+1	0	0+1	0	0	0	0	0
Players who appeared but left during the season
19	FW	(United States) USA	Jolie Donzo	10	1	1+7	0	0+1	0	0+1	1	0	0
22	DF	(England) ENG	Rachel Hindle	2	0	1	0	0	0	1	0	0	0

=== Goalscorers ===
Rank	No.	Nat.	Po.	Name	D1N	FA Cup	WNL Cup	WNL Plate	Total
1	8	(England)	FW	Jessica Mett	9	0	0	0	9
1	10	(England)	MF	Lauren Robson	8	0	1	0	9
2	7	(England)	FW	Ellen Turnbull	8	0	0	0	8
3	23	(England)	FW	Nichole Havery	7	0	0	0	7
4	18	(England)	MF	Sarah Burn	4	0	0	0	4
5	12	(England)	MF	Eve Marshall	2	0	0	1	3
6	5	(England)	DF	Ellen Packham	2	0	0	0	2
6	6	(England)	DF	Abby Towers	2	0	0	0	2
6	21	(England)	FW	Faye Dale	2	0	0	0	2
7	4	(England)	MF	Bethany Guy	1	0	0	0	1
7	16	(England)	MF	Francesca Ward	0	0	1	0	1
7	19	(United States)	FW	Jolie Donzo	0	0	1	0	1
Total					45	0	3	1	49

== Awards ==
=== FA WNL Division One Manager of the Month ===
Key

- Pos – Position in the table at the end of the month

Month	Manager	M	W	D	L	GF	GA	GD	Pts	Pos	Result	Ref.
January	(England) Michael Mulhern	3	3	0	0	8	2	+6	9	2nd	Won	
