= Croatto =

Croatto is a surname. Notable people with the surname include:

- Mara Croatto (born 1969), Puerto Rican actress
- Michela Croatto (born 2002), Austrian footballer
- Silvia Croatto (born 1973), Italian volleyball player
- Tony Croatto (1940–2005), Italian musician
