= Luca Papp =

Hungarian footballer

- Luca Papp and Nicole Woldman in a VfL Wolfsburg game against FC Carl Zeiss Jena. Papp is in green.

Personal information
- Full name: Luca Zsófi Papp
- Date of birth: 24 April 2002 (age 24)
- Height: 1.70 m (5 ft 7 in)
- Position: Midfielder

Team information
- Current team: Sassuolo
- Number: 29

Youth career
- 2012–2013: Bravo DSE
- 2013–2015: NLZ Vasas Budapest
- 2015–2017: Ferencváros Budapest

Senior career*
Years	Team	Apps	(Gls)
2017–2018	Kóka FNLA	12	(2)
2018–2024	Ferencváros	112	(23)
2024–2026	VfL Wolfsburg	3	(0)
2026–	Sassuolo	0	(0)

International career
2017–2019	Hungary U17	10	(1)
2019	Hungary U19	3	(0)
2019–	Hungary	31	(0)
- * Club domestic league appearances and goals as of 13:53, 30 July 2026 (UTC)

Luca Zsófi Papp (born 24 April 2002) is a Hungarian professional footballer who plays as a midfielder for Serie A club Sassuolo and the Hungary national team. She has previously played for Női NB I clubs Kóka FNLA and Ferencváros, and in Germany for Frauen-Bundesliga club VfL Wolfsburg.

== Club career ==
Papp started her youth career with the U-12 team of Bravo DSV, where she remained active from 26 October 2012 until 18 September 2013. In September 2013 she joined the young talent center Vasas Akadémia in Budapest, where she spent two years. In September 2015 Papp joined the youth division of Ferencváros Budapest, where she remained active until August 2017. During this time, Papp made her senior debut with the first team when she was subbed-in in the 46th minute of a Női NB I match against ETO FC Győr.

Papp joined her first senior club, Kóka FNLA, at the time affiliated with Ferencváros, on 14 August 2017 and spent one Női NB I season with them. That season she scored her first goal in senior competition, when she scored against Újpest FC twice in the span of just two minutes.

In summer 2018, Papp return to Ferencváros where she spent six seasons and won the Hungarian Women's Cup twice (2019, 2021), and triumphed in the Női NB I five times (2019, 2021, 2022, 2023, 2024). On 28 May 2024, she was named the league's Player of the Year.

In June 2024, it was announced that Papp signed a three-year contract with Frauen-Bundesliga team VfL Wolfsburg. Papp went on to spend two injury-riddled years with Wolfsburg before departing in July 2026 on a mutual contract termination.

In July 2026, she moved to Serie A to join the Italian top-flight club US Sassuolo Calcio.

== International career ==
Papp made her international debut with the national U17 team in the 2018 UEFA U17 Championship qualification against Moldova. Papp scored her first international goal at the next iteration of UEFA U17 Championship qualification, in her final match of this age group against Georgia.

After making three appearances for the national U19 team, Papp made her senior international debut on 1 March 2019 against Italy.

== Honours ==
Ferencvárosi TC

- Női NB I: 2018–19, 2020–21, 2021–22, 2022–23, 2023–24
- Magyar női kupa: 2018–19, 2020–21
