= Rebecca May =

English footballer (born 2002)

Personal information
- Date of birth: 20 January 2002 (age 24)
- Place of birth: Urmston, England
- Position: Midfielder

Team information
- Current team: Derby County
- Number: 23

Youth career
- Manchester United

Senior career*
Years	Team	Apps	(Gls)
2020–2023	Manchester United	1	(0)
2021–2022	→ Billericay Town (loan)	3	(3)
2023–	Derby County	12	(3)

International career^{‡}
2018–2019	England U17	8	(1)
- * Club domestic league appearances and goals as of 5 May 2024 ‡ National team caps and goals as of 11 May 2019

Rebecca May (born 20 January 2002) is an English footballer who plays as a midfielder for Derby County of the FA Women's National League North.

== Club career ==
=== Manchester United ===
May joined the Manchester United youth setup at under-10 level, progressing through the age groups. She was part of the club's development team that competed in the WSL Academy Cup in the 2018–19 season, losing out to Arsenal in the final. The following season, May saw frequent playing time as the club entered a full-time under-21 team to compete in the FA WSL Academy League for the first time.

In January 2020, May featured in a senior matchday squad for the first time as an unused substitute in the League Cup semi-final defeat to Chelsea. Four days later, on 2 February 2020, May made her senior debut as an 85th minute substitute, replacing Jane Ross in a 1–1 FA WSL draw away to Reading.

On 9 March 2022, May played in the under-21s in the FA WSL Academy Cup final and scored in the 4–1 win over Birmingham City.

May left United in July 2023 following the expiration of her contract having made one senior appearance.

=== Derby County ===
On 26 August 2023, it was announced May had signed for Derby County of the third-tier FA Women's National League North. She scored her first goal for the club on 1 October 2023, a free-kick in a 5–0 win over Doncaster Rovers Belles in the second round of the FA Women's National League Plate.

== International career ==
May has been capped by England at under-17 level. On 21 March 2019, she scored her first goal in an 8–0 UEFA U17 qualifying win over Georgia. In May 2019, May was named to the squad traveling to Bulgaria to contest the 2019 UEFA Women's Under-17 Championship. May made two appearances as the team finished level on points with Germany and Netherlands but were eliminated at the group stage on a head-to-head goal difference tiebreaker. In March 2020, May was called up to the under-19 squad for the first time to compete in the La Manga tournament.

== Career statistics ==
=== Club ===
As of match played 5 May 2024.

Appearances and goals by club, season and competition
Club	Season	League			FA Cup		League Cup (Note: Includes FA WNL Cup and FA WNL Plate)		Total	
Club	Season	Division	Apps	Goals	Apps	Goals	Apps	Goals	Apps	Goals
Manchester United	2019–20	FA WSL	1	0	0	0	0	0	1	0
Derby County	2023–24	FA WNL North	12	3	4	2	6	2	22	7
Career total			13	3	4	2	6	2	23	7

== Honours ==
Derby County

- FA Women's National League Plate: 2023–24
