= Océane Picard =

French footballer (born 2002)

Personal information
- Full name: Océane Celia Picard
- Date of birth: 21 April 2002 (age 24)
- Place of birth: Sélestat, France
- Height: 1.69 m (5 ft 7 in)
- Position: Midfielder

Team information
- Current team: Paris FC
- Number: 21

Youth career
- 2016–2017: FC Sélestat
- 2017–2018: Vendenheim
- 2018–2019: SC Freiburg

Senior career*
Years	Team	Apps	(Gls)
2019–2020	Vendenheim	13	(1)
2020–2023	Metz	47	(14)
2023–2025	Dijon	41	(4)
2025–	Paris FC	21	(1)

International career^{‡}
2018	France U16	3	(2)
2018–2019	France U17	8	(4)
2019	France U19	2	(0)
2021–2022	France U20	4	(1)
2025–	France U23	7	(2)
- * Club domestic league appearances and goals as of 23:00, 6 May 2026 (UTC) ‡ National team caps and goals as of 23:00, 16 April 2026 (UTC)

Océane Celia Picard (born 21 April 2002) is a French professional footballer who plays as a midfielder for Première Ligue club Paris FC. She has previously played for Division 2 clubs FC Vendenheim and FC Metz, as well as fellow Première Ligue side Dijon FCO. Picard has also represented France at the youth international level.

== Club career ==
=== Early career ===
Born and raised in Sélestat, Picard started playing football locally for FC Sélestat's youth teams. She then moved to the nearby town of Strasbourg to enroll in the city's Elite Training Center. Picard also spent time with FC Vendenheim before moving to Germany in 2018 and joining SC Freiburg's youth squad. In June 2019, she scored a brace in Freiburg's under-17 German cup semifinal first leg against Turbine Potsdam.

In 2019, Picard returned to France to gain more visibility in the French football system. She signed for former youth club FC Vendenheim and spent one year with the team before joining fellow second-division side FC Metz in July 2020. In the 2022–23 season, Picard was Metz's top scorer, finishing the campaign with 8 goals.

=== Dijon ===
Picard was Dijon FCO's first summer signing of 2023, joining the club on 23 June. She penned a two-year deal with Dijon, marking her first contract in the top-flight Division 1 Féminine. Picard scored her first goal for Dijon on 4 November 2023, scoring a stoppage-time equalizer against Le Havre to achieve a 3–3 scoreline and salvaging a point for Dijon. Her second-ever Division 1 goal was also an impactful one, coming as the game-winner in the final minutes of a 1–0 victory over Bordeaux.

Overall, Picard played much of her first year at Dijon as a substitute. However, she was a regular starter in her second season, during which she recorded 2 goals and 4 assists across the campaign. One of her two goals came in the first eleven matches of the year and helped Dijon enter the halfway mark of the season in fourth place of the league. Picard helped the club hold on to that fourth place position through the end of the year and qualify for the play-offs for the first time. In Dijon's ensuing semifinal match against Lyon, Picard started and played 71 minutes of the 4–1 defeat to the eventual champions.

=== Paris FC ===
On 26 May 2025, Picard signed a three-year contract for Paris FC, where she reconnected with her old France under-17 national team coach, Sandrine Soubeyrand. Picard made her Paris FC debut in the first match of the season, a 2–0 victory over her former club Dijon on 7 September. She made her first appearances in the UEFA Women's Champions League later the same month, coming off the bench in two qualifying matches against Austria Wien. On 7 October 2025, Picard recorded her first Champions League start and first Paris FC goal contribution, assisting Clara Mateo in Paris FC's first-round draw with OH Leuven.

== International career ==
Picard has represented France at multiple youth national levels. By the time she turned 22 years old, Picard had already made 17 total caps for the U16, U17, U19, and U20 squads. In October 2025, Picard, received her first call-up to the under-23 team, joining a training camp in Portugal alongside Paris FC teammates Fiona Liaigre, Célina Ould Hocine, and Melween N'Dongala.
