= 2023–24 FA Women's National League Plate =

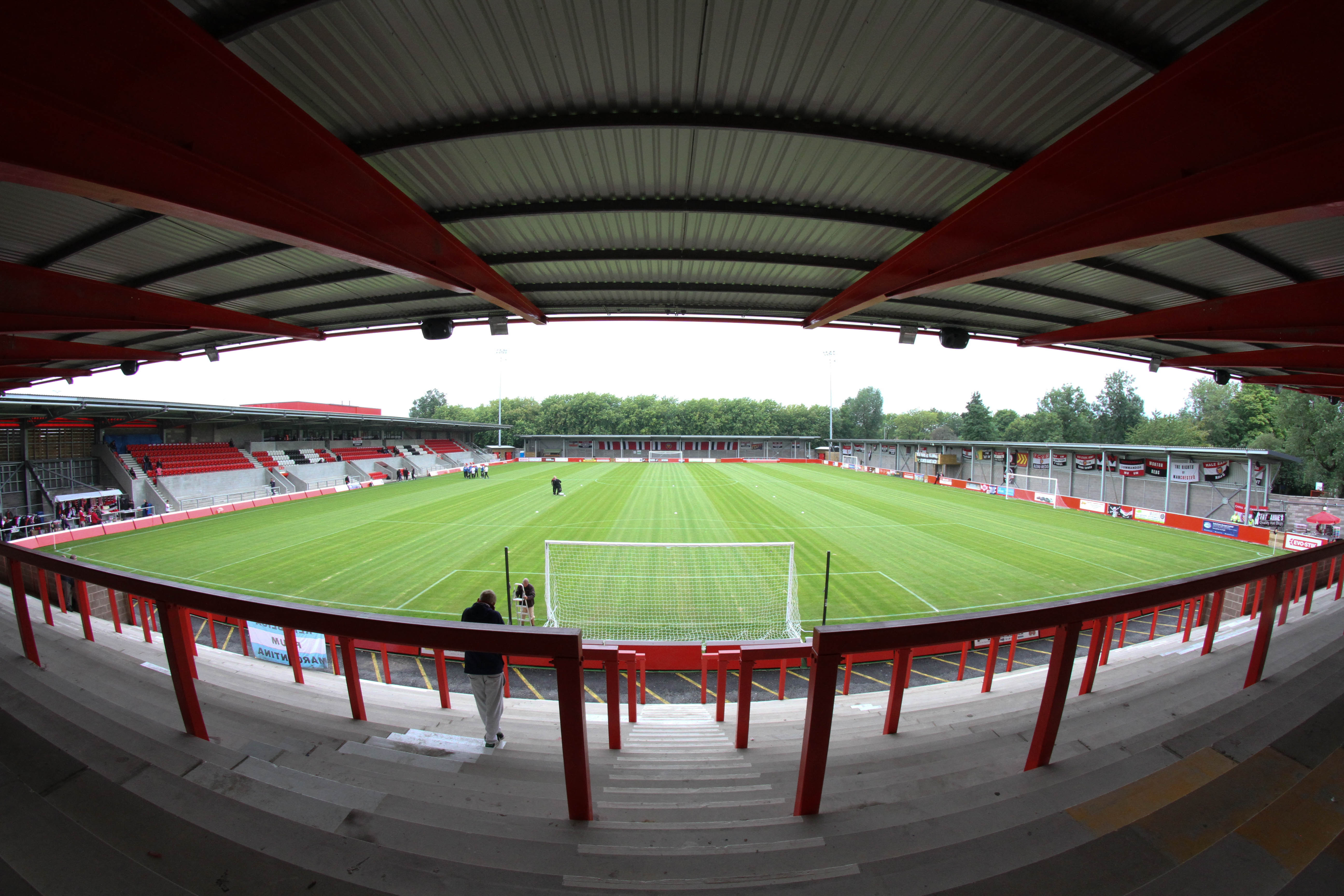
- Broadhurst Park hosted the final

Tournament details
- Country: England
- Dates: 10 October 2023 – 21 April 2024
- Teams: 33

Final positions
- Champions: Derby County (1st title)
- Runners-up: Cambridge United

Tournament statistics
- Matches played: 33
- Goals scored: 134 (4.06 per match)
- All statistics correct as of 21 April 2024.

The 2023–24 FA Women's National League Plate is the ninth season of the competition, open to those eliminated in the determining round of the WNL Cup.

Reigning champions Leeds United won their determining round match this season, meaning that they did not defend their title.

The final was played at Broadhurst Park on 21 April 2024 between Cambridge United and Derby County. Derby County claimed their first title following a 3–0 win.

== Results ==
All results listed are published by The Football Association. Games are listed by round in chronological order, and then in alphabetical order of the home team where matches were played simultaneously.

The division each team play in is indicated in brackets after their name: (S)=Southern Division; (N)=Northern Division; (SW1)=South West Division One; (SE1)=South East Division One; (M1)=Midlands Division One; (N1)=Northern Division One.

=== Preliminary round ===
10 September 2023	Exeter City (SW1)	5–1	Abingdon United	Exeter
14:00	Stacey 29', 61'; Markham 34'; Knapman 79'; Zuurmond 87'	Report	May	Stadium: Exwick Sports Hub; Attendance: 103

=== First round ===
1 October 2023	Sutton Coldfield Town (M1)	3–1	Middlesbrough	Sutton Coldfield
14:00	Jefferies 1', 68'; Woolston 31'	Report	Marshall 38'	Stadium: Central Ground; Attendance: 56

1 October 2023	Southampton Women	2–1	Bridgwater United	Southampton
14:00	Wood 22'; Jeal 64'	Report	Everson	Stadium: Test Park Sports Ground; Attendance: 40

1 October 2023	Portishead Town	0–9	Billericay Town (S)	Portishead
14:00		Report	Gaylor; Hennessy; King; Rushen; Thomas	Stadium: Bristol Road; Attendance: 70

1 October 2023	Norton and Stockton Ancients	0–3	Hull City (N1)	Norton
14:00		Report	Lynskey 8'; Brookes 10'; Knight 50'	Stadium: Norton Sports Complex

1 October 2023	Northampton Town	5–0	Leek Town	Northampton
14:00	Richards 18'; Bell 24', 77'; Boote 38'; Dicks 90'	Report		Stadium: O'Riordan Bond Stadium; Attendance: 156

1 October 2023	Maidenhead United (SW1)	9–0	Selsey	Maidenhead
14:00	Fisher 16', 36', 62'; Stockton 26', 72'; O'Brien 30', 38'; Thompson 40'; Walters 90'	Report		Stadium: York Road; Attendance: 62

1 October 2023	Lincoln City	0–2	Sheffield	Lincoln
14:00		Report	Brooks; Fugler	Stadium: Moorlands Sports Ground

1 October 2023	Leafield Athletic	0–1	FC United of Manchester	Shirley
14:00		Report	Reeves 63'	Stadium: The Coppice; Attendance: 100

1 October 2023	Keynsham Town	H–W	AFC Sudbury	Keynsham
14:00		Report		Stadium: The AJN Stadium

1 October 2023	Exeter City (SW1)	H–W	Torquay United	Exeter
14:00		Report		Stadium: Exwick Sports Club

1 October 2023	Doncaster Rovers Belles	0–5	Derby County (N)	Moorends
14:00		Report	Rhodes-Andrews 2', 23'; May 30'; Timms 37'; Jackson 83'	Stadium: Chesterfield Poultry Stadium

1 October 2023	Barnsley (N1)	7–0	Solihull Moors	Middlecliffe
14:00	Stuart 33'; Shaw 42'; Myles 67'; Marsden 90+2'	Report		Stadium: Houghton Main Miners Welfare Ground

1 October 2023	Ashford Town	1–3	Haywards Heath Town	Stanwell
14:00	Fagbohun 42'	Report	Franklin; Goulden; Harris-Walters	Stadium: Robert Parker Stadium

1 October 2023	Actonians	1–2	Cambridge United (SE1)	Northolt
14:00	D'Santos	Report	Kosky; Stojko-Down	Stadium: Rectory Park; Attendance: 45

1 October 2023	Chatham Town	2–3	London Seaward	Chatham
14:00	Grant; Madamombe	Report	Campbell; Lanza	Stadium: Maidstone Road Sports Ground; Attendance: 165

15 October 2023	Chorley	0–0 (a.e.t.) (4–5 p)	York City	Coppull
14:00		Report		Stadium: Blainscough Park

=== Second round ===
29 October 2023	Northampton Town	2–5	Derby County (N)	Northampton
14:00	Goal	Report	Rai 8'; Sims 45'; Mosby 46'; Tinsley 70'; Ashton 72'	Stadium: O'Riordan Bond Stadium

29 October 2023	FC United of Manchester	0–6	Hull City (N1)	Moston
14:00		Report	Lynskey 25'; Knight 39', 40', 60'; Ackroyd 83'; Hunt 88'	Stadium: Broadhurst Park; Attendance: 85

29 October 2023	Exeter City (SW1)	2–0	London Seaward	Exeter
14:00	Baker 74'; Taylor 77'	Report		Stadium: Exwick Sports Hub; Attendance: 212

29 October 2023	Cambridge United (SE1)	2–1 (a.e.t.)	Keynsham Town	St Neots
14:00	Fox; Simmons	Report	Clipston 60'	Stadium: Rowley Park; Attendance: 85

29 October 2023	Barnsley (N1)	4–0	Sheffield	Sheffield
14:00	Marsden; Stuart; Housecroft	Report		Stadium: Steel City Stadium; Attendance: 50

29 October 2023	Sutton Coldfield Town (M1)	2–1	York City	Sutton Coldfield
14:00	Woolston 76'; Farquharson 89'	Report	Hughes 88'	Stadium: Central Ground; Attendance: 53

29 October 2023	Billericay Town (S)	9–0	Southampton Women	Billericay
14:00	Biggs; Gaylor; Iton; Jones; Smith; Walsh; King	Report		Stadium: New Lodge; Attendance: 176

29 October 2023	Maidenhead United (SW1)	4–2	Haywards Heath Town	Burnham
14:00	Walters 11'; Stockton 46'; Thompson 68'; O'Brien 84'	Report	Goal	Stadium: [Burnham F.C.|The 1878 Stadium]] Attendance: 20

=== Quarter-finals ===
28 January 2024	Maidenhead United (SW1)	0–1	Cambridge United (SE1)	Maidenhead
14:00		Report	Stojko-Down	Stadium: York Road

28 January 2024	Barnsley (N1)	3–3 (4–2 p)	Hull City (N1)	Sheffield
14:00	Housecroft 12'; Pierrepont 48'; Stuart 78'	Report	Tanser; Bott; Brookes	Stadium: Olympic Legacy Park

28 January 2024	Billericay Town (S)	0–2	Exeter City (SW1)	Billericay
14:00		Report	Stacey 76'; Ireland 79'	Stadium: New Lodge

28 January 2024	Sutton Coldfield Town (M1)	0–5	Derby County (N)	Sutton Coldfield
14:00		Report	Sims 9', 21', 40'; May 80'; Rai 90+2'	Stadium: Central Ground

=== Semi-finals ===
25 February 2024	Cambridge United (SE1)	3–2	Barnsley (N1)	St Neots
14:00 GMT	Kosky; Simmons; Fox	Report	Michalska; Millard	Stadium: Rowley Park

25 February 2024	Exeter City (SW1)	2–4	Derby County (N)	Exeter
14:00 GMT	Taylor 30'; Pollock 64'	Report	Ashton 37'; Steggles 43'; 50' (o.g.); Jenkins 79'	Stadium: Exwick Sports Hub

== Final ==
21 April 2024
14:00 GMT

Cambridge United (SE1)	0–3	Derby County (N)
	Report	Ashton 30'; Sims 45'; Joyce 87'

Broadhurst Park, Moston
