= Wiktoria Zieniewicz =

Polish footballer (born 2002)

Personal information
- Date of birth: 5 September 2002 (age 24)
- Place of birth: Trzebinia, Poland
- Position: Defender

Team information
- Current team: Werder Bremen
- Number: 3

Youth career
- –2014: MKS Trzebinia
- 2014–2016: Bronowianka Kraków
- 2016–2018: UKS SMS Łódź

Senior career*
| Years | Team | Apps | (Gls) |
| 2016 | Bronowianka Kraków | 5 | (2) |
| 2018–2021 | UKS SMS Łódź II | 16 | (0) |
| 2021 | UKS SMS Łódź III | 1 | (0) |
| 2018–2024 | UKS SMS Łódź | 108 | (7) |
| 2024–2025 | FC Fleury 91 | 3 | (0) |
| 2025–2026 | Basel | 27 | (1) |
| 2026– | Werder Bremen | 11 | (0) |

International career^{‡}
| 2018–2019 | Poland U17 | 8 | (2) |
| 2019–2020 | Poland U19 | 7 | (0) |
| 2023 | Poland U23 | 1 | (0) |
| 2023– | Poland | 36 | (0) |
- * Club domestic league appearances and goals as of 21:40, 21 November 2026 (UTC) ‡ National team caps and goals as of 22:36, 13 October 2026 (UTC)

Wiktoria Zieniewicz (born 5 September 2002) is a Polish professional footballer who plays as a defender for Frauen-Bundesliga club Werder Bremen and the Poland national team.

== Career ==
Zieniewicz joined Bundesliga club Werder Bremen in July 2026.

== Career statistics ==
=== Club ===
As of match played 21 November 2026

Appearances and goals by club, season and competition
| Club | Season | League | | | National cup (Note: Includes Polish Cup, Swiss Cup, DFB-Pokal) | | Europe | | Other | | Total | |
| Club | Season | Division | Apps | Goals | Apps | Goals | Apps | Goals | Apps | Goals | Apps | Goals |
|---|---|---|---|---|---|---|---|---|---|---|---|---|
| Bronowianka Kraków | 2016–17 | II liga, group IV | 5 | 2 | 0 | 0 | — | | — | | 5 | 2 |
| UKS SMS Łódź II | 2018–19 | I liga | 9 | 0 | 1 | 0 | — | | — | | 10 | 0 |
| UKS SMS Łódź II | 2019–20 | I liga | 5 | 0 | 0 | 0 | — | | — | | 5 | 0 |
| UKS SMS Łódź II | 2020–21 | I liga | 1 | 0 | 0 | 0 | — | | — | | 1 | 0 |
| UKS SMS Łódź II | 2021–22 | I liga | 1 | 0 | 0 | 0 | — | | — | | 1 | 0 |
| UKS SMS Łódź II | Total | | 16 | 0 | 1 | 0 | — | | — | | 17 | 0 |
| UKS SMS Łódź III | 2021–22 | II liga North | 1 | 0 | 0 | 0 | — | | — | | 1 | 0 |
| UKS SMS Łódź | 2018–19 | Ekstraliga | 12 | 0 | 2 | 0 | — | | — | | 14 | 0 |
| UKS SMS Łódź | 2019–20 | Ekstraliga | 11 | 0 | 5 | 0 | — | | — | | 16 | 0 |
| UKS SMS Łódź | 2020–21 | Ekstraliga | 20 | 1 | 5 | 0 | — | | — | | 25 | 1 |
| UKS SMS Łódź | 2021–22 | Ekstraliga | 22 | 2 | 5 | 0 | — | | — | | 27 | 2 |
| UKS SMS Łódź | 2022–23 | Ekstraliga | 21 | 1 | 6 | 1 | 1 (Note: Appearance in UEFA Champions League) | 0 | — | | 28 | 2 |
| UKS SMS Łódź | 2023–24 | Ekstraliga | 22 | 3 | 4 | 1 | — | | — | | 26 | 4 |
| UKS SMS Łódź | Total | | 108 | 7 | 27 | 2 | 1 | 0 | — | | 136 | 9 |
| Dijon | 2024–25 | Première Ligue | 3 | 0 | ? | ? | — | | — | | 3 | 0 |
| Basel | 2024–25 | Super League | 8 | 0 | 3 | 0 | — | | — | | 11 | 0 |
| Basel | 2025–26 | Super League | 19 | 1 | 2 | 0 | — | | — | | 21 | 1 |
| Basel | Total | | 27 | 1 | 5 | 0 | — | | — | | 32 | 1 |
| Werder Bremen | 2026–27 | Frauen-Bundesliga | 11 | 0 | 2 | 0 | — | | — | | 13 | 0 |
| Career total | | | 171 | 10 | 35 | 2 | 1 | 0 | — | | 206 | 12 |

=== International ===
As of match played 13 October 2026

Appearances and goals by national team and year
| National team | Year | Apps | Goals |
|---|---|---|---|
| Poland | 2023 | 5 | 0 |
| Poland | 2024 | 11 | 0 |
| Poland | 2025 | 12 | 0 |
| Poland | 2026 | 8 | 0 |
| Total | | 36 | 0 |

== Honours ==
UKS SMS Łódź

- Ekstraliga: 2021–22
- Polish Cup: 2022–23
