= Lilli Purtscheller =

Austrian footballer (born 2003)

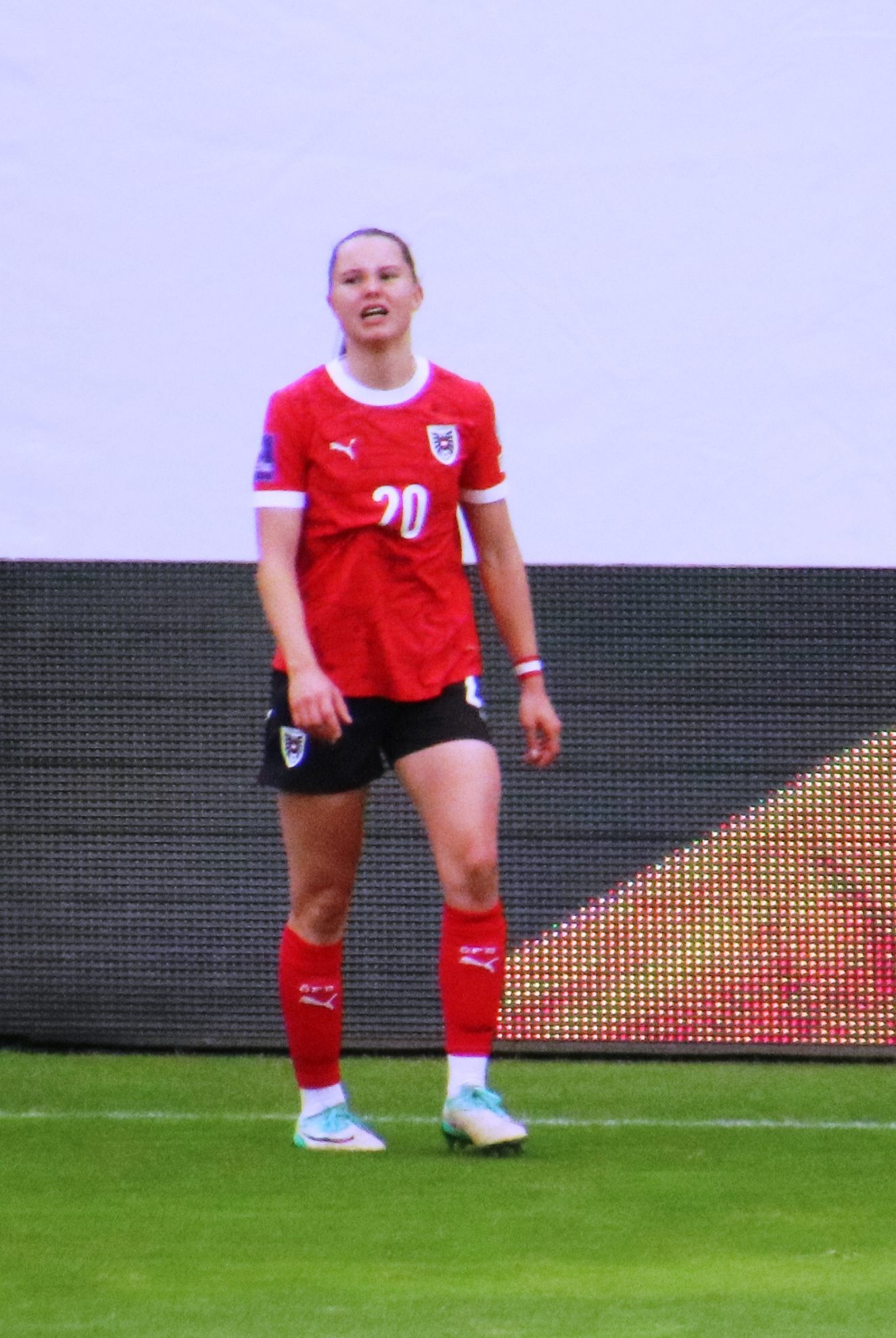
- Purtscheller in 2024

Personal information
- Date of birth: 12 August 2003 (age 23)
- Place of birth: Innsbruck, Austria
- Height: 1.71 m (5 ft 7 in)
- Position: Midfielder

Team information
- Current team: Werder Bremen
- Number: 7

Senior career*
Years	Team	Apps	(Gls)
2019–2021	Wacker Innsbruck	19	(5)
2021–2023	Sturm Graz	20	(11)
2023–2026	SGS Essen	43	(6)
2026–	Werder Bremen	11	(1)

International career^{‡}
2018–2019	Austria U17	12	(7)
2021	Austria U19	3	(0)
2023–	Austria	25	(3)
- * Club domestic league appearances and goals as of 21 November 2026 ‡ National team caps and goals as of 14 October 2026

Lilli Purtscheller (born 12 August 2003) is an Austrian professional footballer who plays as a midfielder for Frauen-Bundesliga club Werder Bremen.

== Career ==
In April 2026 it was announced that Purtscheller would join SGS Essen's Frauen-Bundesliga rivals Werder Bremen for the 2026–27 season. At the time, she had been out of action for almost a year through an cruciate ligament tear.

== Career statistics ==
Scores and results list Austria's goal tally first, score column indicates score after each Purtscheller goal.

List of international goals scored by Lilli Purtscheller
No.	Date	Venue	Opponent	Score	Result	Competition
1	9 April 2024	Stadion Miejski w Gdyni, Gdynia, Poland	Poland	2–1	3–1	UEFA Women's Euro 2025 qualifying
2	25 October 2024	Bonifika Stadium, Koper, Slovenia	Slovenia	3–0	3–0	UEFA Women's Euro 2025 qualifying play-offs
3	21 February 2025	Josko Arena, Ried im Innkreis, Austria	Scotland	1–0	1–0	2025 UEFA Women's Nations League
