= Annabel Schasching =

Austrian footballer

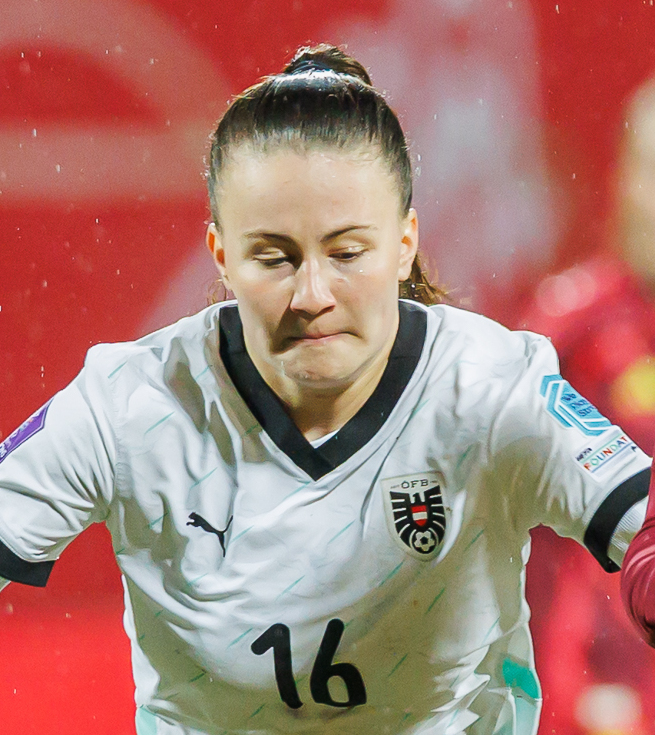
- Schasching with Austria in 2025

Personal information
- Date of birth: 26 July 2002 (age 24)
- Place of birth: Austria
- Height: 1.63 m (5 ft 4 in)
- Position: Midfielder

Team information
- Current team: RB Leipzig
- Number: 16

Youth career
- 2009–2018: Union St. Aegidi

Senior career*
Years	Team	Apps	(Gls)
2018–2020	St. Pölten	13	(2)
2020–2022	Sturm Graz	45	(25)
2023–2025	SC Freiburg	54	(5)
2025–	RB Leipzig	31	(5)

International career^{‡}
2017–2018	Austria U16	3	(0)
2017–2019	Austria U17	16	(10)
2019–2020	Austria U19	11	(1)
2021–	Austria	39	(3)
- * Club domestic league appearances and goals as of 18:06, 7 October 2026 (UTC) ‡ National team caps and goals as of 14 October 2026

Annabel Schasching (born 26 July 2002) is an Austrian professional footballer who plays as a midfielder for Frauen-Bundesliga club RB Leipzig and the Austria national team.

== Club career ==
Schasching started her senior career at St. Pölten in 2018, then she joined Sturm Graz in 2020. In December 2022, it was announced that Schasching would join German side SC Freiburg during the winter transfer window in January 2023.

For the 2025–26 season, she moved to RB Leipzig.

== International career ==
Schasching played for Austria U17 at the 2019 UEFA Women's Under-17 Championship.

In March 2021, she received her first call-up for the Austrian national team by coach Irene Fuhrmann. However, she was unable to feature in any matches in April that year, as several Sturm Graz players tested positive for COVID-19. On 30 November 2021, she made her international debut in an 8–0 victory over Luxembourg during the 2023 World Cup qualification.

She scored her first goal for the national team in her third appearance on 22 June 2022 in a 4–0 friendly win against Montenegro. A month later, on 4 July, she was named in the squad for the UEFA Women's Euro 2022, replacing Maria Plattner who withdrew following a shoulder injury sustained in training.

== Career statistics ==
=== International ===
As of match played 13 October 2026

Appearances and goals by national team and year
National team	Year	Apps	Goals
Austria
Austria	2021	1	0
Austria	2022	4	1
Austria	2023	9	0
Austria	2024	9	1
Austria	2025	9	1
Austria	2026	7	0
Total		39	3

Scores and results list Austria's goal tally first, score column indicates score after each Schasching goal.

List of international goals scored by Annabel Schasching
No.	Date	Venue	Opponent	Score	Result	Competition
1	22 June 2022	motion invest Arena, Maria Enzersdorf, Austria	Montenegro	4–0	4–0	Friendly
2	12 July 2024	Stadion Schnabelholz, Altach, Austria	Poland	3–0	3–1	UEFA Women's Euro 2025 qualifying
3	25 February 2025	Max-Morlock-Stadion, Nuremberg, Germany	Germany	1–0	1–4	2025 UEFA Women's Nations League

== Honours ==
SC Freiburg

- German Cup runner-up: 2022–23

Individual

- ÖFB Frauen Bundesliga top scorer: 2021–22 (15 goals)
