= Alexandra Burova =

Kazakhstani footballer

Personal information
- Date of birth: 22 August 2002 (age 24)
- Height: 1.69 m (5 ft 7 in)
- Position: Defender

International career^{‡}
Years	Team	Apps	(Gls)
- Kazakhstan
- ‡ National team caps and goals as of 19:40, 30 August 2019 (UTC)

Alexandra Burova (Russian: Александра Александровна Бурова; born 22 August 2002) is a Kazakhstani footballer who plays as a defender and has appeared for the Kazakhstan women's national team.

== Career ==
Burova has been capped for the Kazakhstan national team, appearing for the team during the 2019 FIFA Women's World Cup qualifying cycle.
