= Sara Carrillo =

Spanish footballer (born 2002)

Personal information
- Full name: Sara Carrillo Moreno
- Date of birth: 20 August 2002 (age 24)
- Place of birth: Arnedo, Spain
- Position: Forward

Team information
- Current team: Alavés
- Number: 19

Senior career*
Years	Team	Apps	(Gls)
2016–2018	Pradejón		
2018–2021	Osasuna	45+	(17+)
2021–	Alavés	98	(17)

International career
2019	Spain U17	6	(6)
- * Club domestic league appearances and goals as of 25 July 2025

Sara Carrillo Moreno (born 20 August 2002) is a Spanish footballer who plays as a forward for Alavés.

== Club career ==
Carrillo started her career at Pradejón. She moved to Osasuna in 2018, spending three seasons in Pamplona before switching to Alavés, newly promoted to the Liga F, in 2021 on a two-year contract.

== International career ==
Carrillo was a member of the Spain under-17 squad that qualified for the UEFA Women's Under-17 Championship in Bulgaria in 2019, scoring six goals during the qualification phase. She was later called up to the Spain under-19s.
