= Jessica King (footballer) =

English football manager (born 1992)

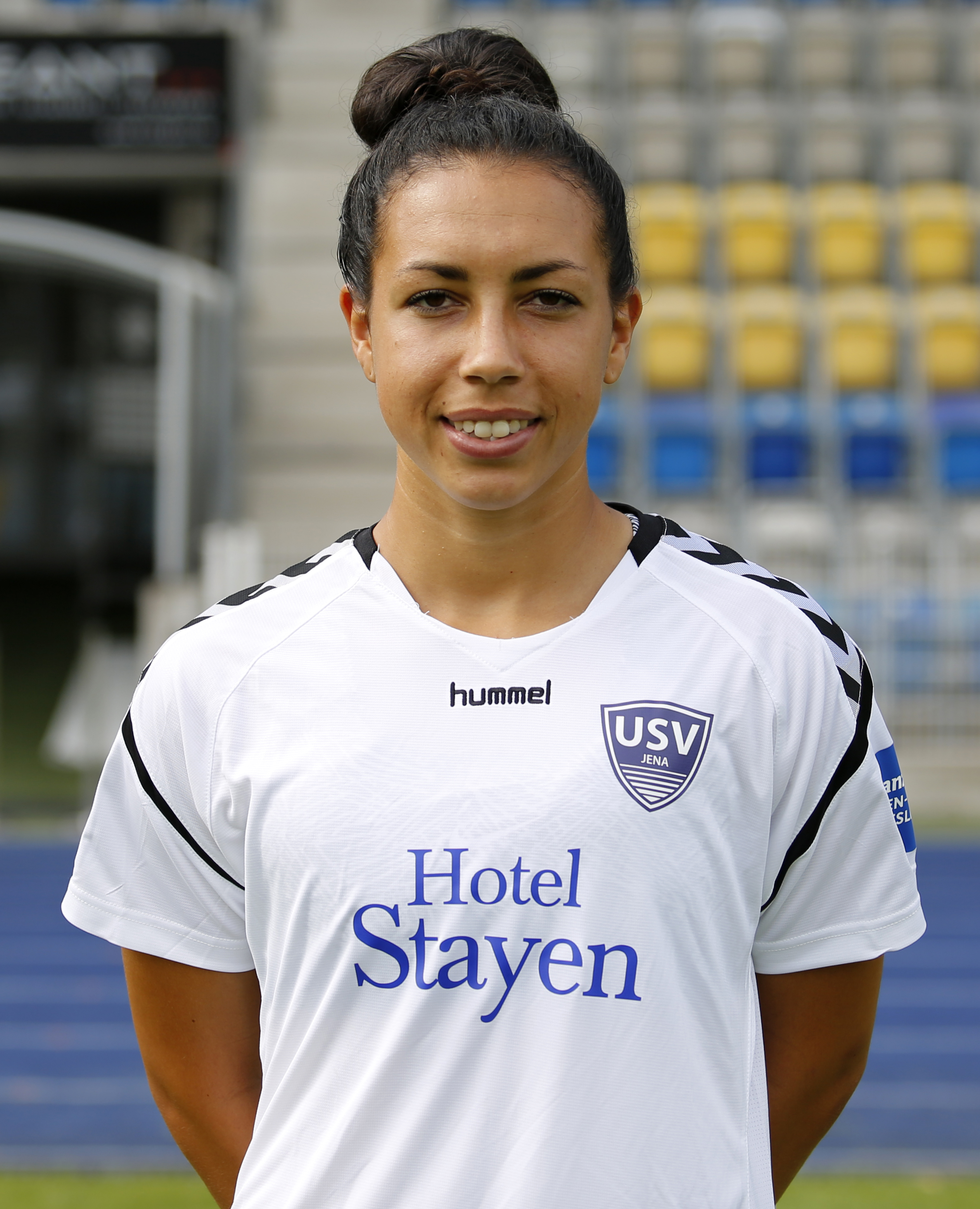
- Jessica King in 2017

Personal information
- Full name: Jessica Louise King
- Date of birth: 31 May 1992 (age 34)
- Place of birth: Liverpool, England
- Height: 1.68 m (5 ft 6 in)
- Position: Forward

College career
Years	Team	Apps	(Gls)
2010–2014	Trinity Western Spartans	67	(23)

Senior career*
Years	Team	Apps	(Gls)
2008–2010	Liverpool		
2015	Everton	3	(0)
- FC Basel
2017–2018	USV Jena	16	(0)
2017–2018	USV Jena II	2	(1)
2018	Kolbotn	10	(2)
2018–2020	Lewes	18	(4)
2020–2022	Charlton Athletic	33	(7)
2022	Billericay Town		
2024–	Chatham Town		
- * Club domestic league appearances and goals

Jessica Louise King (born 31 May 1992) is an English football manager and player who plays as a forward for Chatham Town.

King has played in England, Canada, Germany and Norway. She has been vocal about racism and gender inequality during her football and music career.

== Career ==
In 2010, King joined the Trinity Western University Spartans women's soccer program. During the 2014 season, she scored 12 goals in 11 league appearances, including a hattrick, and was named Most Valuable Player and in the 2014 Canada West First Team All-Stars. She was also named Player of the Year, becoming the first TWS player to receive the award.

On 16 February 2015, King was announced at Everton on a permanent transfer.

In June 2017, it was announced that King would be leaving FC Basel.

On 27 August 2017, King joined USV Jena on a permanent transfer from FC Basel Frauen.

On 9 August 2018, King was announced at Kolbotn on a permanent transfer.

In 2020, King joined Charlton Athletic on a permanent transfer. On 24 July 2021, she signed a professional contract with the club after scoring 7 goals during the 2020 season.

In 2021, King suffered a concussion and had to stop playing football. During this time, she spent more time working on spoken-word, poetry and music. In 2022, King was playing for Billericay Town.

In 2024, King joined Chatham Town as a player-coach. She also works as a Talent ID coach for South London.

== Music career ==
King has released several pieces of music, including the singles "Look Into My Eyes" and "Raise Us Up" under the name Jess King.

== Activism ==
In 2022, she organized "Black To The Future", an event celebrating black culture in women's football.
