= Ilham Abali =

Dutch footballer (born 2002)

Personal information
- Full name: Ilham Abali
- Date of birth: 19 February 2002 (age 24)
- Place of birth: Vlissingen, Netherlands
- Position: Midfielder

Team information
- Current team: FC Twente
- Number: 3

Youth career
- ADO Den Haag

Senior career*
Years	Team	Apps	(Gls)
2019–2024	ADO Den Haag	17	(0)
2025–	FC Twente		

International career
2017	Netherlands U15	3	(0)
2018	Netherlands U16	6	(0)
2018–2019	Netherlands U17	13	(3)
2019	Netherlands U19	5	(0)
- * Club domestic league appearances and goals as of 10 February 2024

Ilham Abali (born 19 February 2002) is a Dutch professional footballer who plays as a midfielder for Eredivisie club FC Twente.

== Club career ==
Abali made her senior-team debut with ADO Den Haag at the age of 16, and was promoted to the first team in 2020. Sidelined due to a serious knee injury in 2020, in 2022, she extended her contract with ADO through the summer of 2023. On 7 May 2023, she made her return to the pitch as a substitute in the 88th minute at home against Excelsior Rotterdam.

Abali was injured in the summer of 2024, and spent 2024-25 rehabilitating from the injury. On 16 September 2025, she signed with Twente.

== International career ==
In 2019, Abali reached the European Championship final with the Netherlands women's national under-17 football team, winning silver.

== Personal life ==
Abali was born in Vlissingen, Netherlands. She was one of more than 20 Moroccan-Dutch footballers and coaches featured in the book Marokkaanse trots: Smaakmakers in de eredivisie (2020), examining their experience in the Eredivisie, the top-flight of football in the Netherlands.
