= Natasha Kowalski =

German footballer (born 2003)

Personal information
- Date of birth: 12 June 2003 (age 23)
- Place of birth: Holzminden, Germany
- Height: 1.70 m (5 ft 7 in)
- Position: Midfielder

Team information
- Current team: Bayer Leverkusen
- Number: 11

Senior career*
| Years | Team | Apps | (Gls) |
| 2019–2022 | VfL Wolfsburg II | 50 | (17) |
| 2022–2026 | SGS Essen | 89 | (17) |
| 2026– | Bayer Leverkusen | 0 | (0) |

International career
| 2019 | Germany U17 | 8 | (2) |
| 2021– | Germany U19 | 1 | (0) |
- * Club domestic league appearances and goals as of 5 July 2026

Natasha Kowalski (born 12 June 2003) is a German footballer who plays as a midfielder for Bayer Leverkusen.

== International career ==
Kowalski has represented Germany at youth level.
