= Toni Leigh Finnegan =

Northern Irish footballer

Personal information
- Date of birth: 16 October 2002 (age 24)
- Place of birth: Northern Ireland,
- Position: Defender

Team information
- Current team: Cliftonville
- Number: 6

Senior career*
Years	Team	Apps	(Gls)
- Cliftonville

International career^{‡}
2017–2019	Northern Ireland U17	12	(8)
2019–	Northern Ireland U19	3	(1)
2020–	Northern Ireland	6	(0)
- * Club domestic league appearances and goals ‡ National team caps and goals as of 10 March 2020

Toni Leigh Finnegan (born 16 October 2002) is a Northern Ireland association footballer who plays as a defender for Women's Premiership club Cliftonville Ladies FC and the Northern Ireland women's national team.
