= Célina Ould Hocine =

Algerian footballer (born 2002)

Personal information
- Full name: Célina Drifa Ould Hocine
- Date of birth: 3 February 2002 (age 24)
- Place of birth: Paris, France
- Height: 1.67 m (5 ft 6 in)
- Position: Centre-back

Team information
- Current team: Paris FC
- Number: 2

Youth career
- 2010–2015: Paris Université Club
- 2015–2020: Paris Saint-Germain
- 2020: Paris FC

Senior career*
Years	Team	Apps	(Gls)
2020–	Paris FC	107	(3)

International career^{‡}
2019	France U17	5	(2)
2019–2020	France U19	5	(2)
2022	France U20	9	(1)
2023–2026	France U23	14	(0)
2026–	Algeria	2	(0)
- * Club domestic league appearances and goals as of 22 November 2026 ‡ National team caps and goals as of 17 October 2026

Célina Drifa Ould Hocine (Arabic: سيلينا ظريفة ولد حسين; born 3 February 2002) is a professional footballer who plays as a centre-back for Première Ligue club Paris FC. Born in France and having represented France at the youth national level, she plays for the Algeria national team.

== Youth career ==
Born and raised in Paris, Ould Hocine started participating in football as a child after watching her brother and cousin play. Five years later, her father enrolled her at the Paris Université Club's football academy, where she began playing smaller-sided football with boys. In 2015, Ould Hocine joined Paris Saint-Germain's youth program. She eventually rose to the ranks of PSG's under-19 squad and was named team captain. In her final season with the club, she made 13 league appearances and scored 1 goal for the U19s. In 2020, she chose to depart from the academy due to a lack of opportunities to earn a contract in the Division I with PSG.

== Club career ==
In June 2020, Ould Hocine signed a first-team deal with Paris FC after her uncle had reached out to the club. Primarily a full-back at Paris Saint-Germain, Ould Hocine transitioned to become a central defender at Paris FC. Over her first three seasons at the club, she was largely a rotational player, starting in 17 of her 38 league matches in that time period.

In the 2023–24 UEFA Women's Champions League qualifying rounds, Ould Hocine helped Paris FC beat English side Arsenal and German club VfL Wolfsburg to reach the main Champions League tournament. In the second leg of Paris FC's play-off against Wolfsburg, Ould Hocine shone defensively and contributed a goal-line clearance in the second half. During the subsequent Champions League group stage matches, Ould Hocine also picked up a positive performance against Real Madrid; she has later referred to her play against Wolfsburg and Real Madrid to be her "best performances" as a Paris FC player.

Over the next season, Ould Hocine gained more regular starts. She helped her team win the 2025 Coupe de France Féminine final after beating Paris Saint-Germain on penalties. On 31 May 2025, she re-signed with Paris FC through 2028, despite having the option to move abroad to a club in England.

== International career ==
Ould Hocine is of Algerian descent and is eligible to represent either France or Algeria internationally.

In 2019, Ould Hocine gained her first experiences with the France youth national teams, appearing in 5 matches for the under-17 squad. She then moved up a level to the U19s, where she was the only Paris Saint-Germain youth player in France's squad at the 2020 La Manga Cup. In 2022, Ould Hocine was named to the roster that participated in the 2022 FIFA U-20 Women's World Cup. Starting in 2023, she spent several years as a regular member of the France U23s.

Ould Hocine chose to switch allegiances to Algeria in September 2026. On 2 October 2026, she received her first call-up to the Algeria senior national team.

== Personal life ==
While playing for Paris FC, she has worked towards a degree in sports management at the Paris-Saclay University.

== Career statistics ==
=== Club ===
As of match played 22 November 2026

Appearances and goals by club, season and competition
Club	Season	League			National cup		League cup		Continental		Other		Total	
Club	Season	Division	Apps	Goals	Apps	Goals	Apps	Goals	Apps	Goals	Apps	Goals	Apps	Goals
Paris FC	2020–21	D1F	9	0	0	0	—		—		—		9	0
Paris FC	2021–22	D1F	13	1	2	0	—		—		—		15	1
Paris FC	2022–23	D1F	16	1	1	1	—		0	0	—		17	2
Paris FC	2023–24	D1F	20	0	2	0	—		10 (Note: Appearances in UEFA Women's Champions League)	0	2 (Note: Appearance(s) in playoffs)	0	34	0
Paris FC	2024–25	Première Ligue	19	0	4	0	—		4	0	1	0	28	0
Paris FC	2025–26	Première Ligue	21	0	4	0	1	1	10	0	2	0	38	1
Paris FC	2026–27	Première Ligue	9	1	0	0	0	0	5	1	—		14	2
Career total			107	3	13	1	1	1	29	1	5	0	155	6

== Honours ==
Paris FC

- Coupe de France Féminine: 2024–25
