= Michela Croatto =

Austrian footballer (born 2002)

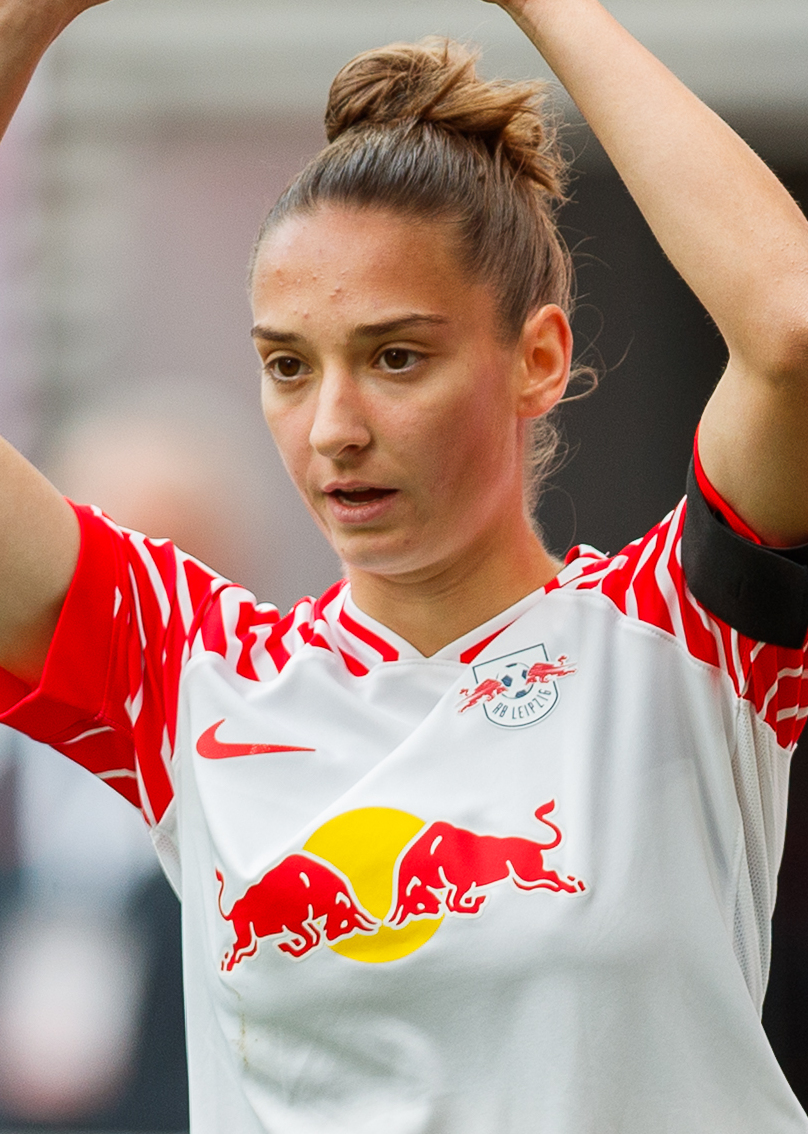
- Croatto with RB Leipzig in 2023

Personal information
- Date of birth: 29 June 2002 (age 24)
- Place of birth: Villach, Austria
- Height: 1.64 m (5 ft 5 in)
- Position: Defender

Youth career
- 2010–2011: Villacher SV
- 2011–2014: SV Wernberg
- 2014–2015: Villacher SV
- 2015–2016: SV St. Jakob/Rosental
- 2016–2018: Villacher SV

Senior career*
Years	Team	Apps	(Gls)
2018–2020	SKN St. Pölten		
2020–2021	SV Neulengbach	16	(1)
2021–2023	Sturm Graz	31	(9)
2023–2025	RB Leipzig	30	(0)
2025–2026	Hamburger SV	6	(0)

International career^{‡}
2017–2018	Austria U16	5	(0)
2018–2019	Austria U17	13	(2)
2019–2020	Austria U19	9	(0)
2023–2024	Austria	2	(0)
- * Club domestic league appearances and goals as of 17 May 2026 ‡ National team caps and goals as of 22 May 2025

Michela Croatto (born 29 June 2002) is an Austrian professional footballer who plays as a defender.

She joined RB Leipzig in 2023 and Hamburger SV in 2025.

Croatto is of Italian descent through her father.

== Career statistics ==
=== International ===
As of match played 29 October 2024

Appearances and goals by national team and year
National team	Year	Apps	Goals
Austria
Austria	2023	1	0
Austria	2024	1	0
Total		2	0
