= 2017 UEFA Women's Under-17 Championship qualification =

Tournament details
- Dates: Qualifying round: 20 September – 31 October 2016; Elite round: 13 March – 2 April 2017
- Teams: 45 (from 1 confederation)

Tournament statistics
- Matches played: 102
- Goals scored: 366 (3.59 per match)
- Top scorer: (Netherlands) Joëlle Smits (10 goals)

The 2017 UEFA Women's Under-17 Championship qualifying competition was a women's under-17 football competition that determined the seven teams joining the automatically qualified hosts Czech Republic in the 2017 UEFA Women's Under-17 Championship final tournament.

A total of 45 UEFA member national teams entered the qualifying competition (including Malta who entered for the first time). Players born on or after 1 January 2000 are eligible to participate. Each match has a duration of 80 minutes, consisting of two halves of 40 minutes with a 15-minute half-time.

== Format ==
The qualifying competition consists of two rounds:

- Qualifying round: Apart from Spain, which receive a bye to the elite round as the team with the highest seeding coefficient, the remaining 44 teams are drawn into 11 groups of four teams. Each group is played in single round-robin format at one of the teams selected as hosts after the draw. The 11 group winners, the 11 runners-up, and the third-placed team with the best record against the first and second-placed teams in their group advance to the elite round.
- Elite round: The 24 teams are drawn into six groups of four teams. Each group is played in single round-robin format at one of the teams selected as hosts after the draw. The six group winners and the runner-up with the best record against the first and third-placed teams in their group qualify for the final tournament.

=== Tiebreakers ===
The teams are ranked according to points (3 points for a win, 1 point for a draw, 0 points for a loss). If two or more teams are equal on points on completion of a mini-tournament, the following tie-breaking criteria are applied, in the order given, to determine the rankings (Regulations Articles 14.01 and 14.02):

1. Higher number of points obtained in the mini-tournament matches played among the teams in question;
2. Superior goal difference resulting from the mini-tournament matches played among the teams in question;
3. Higher number of goals scored in the mini-tournament matches played among the teams in question;
4. If, after having applied criteria 1 to 3, teams still have an equal ranking, criteria 1 to 3 are reapplied exclusively to the mini-tournament matches between the teams in question to determine their final rankings. If this procedure does not lead to a decision, criteria 5 to 9 apply;
5. Superior goal difference in all mini-tournament matches;
6. Higher number of goals scored in all mini-tournament matches;
7. If only two teams have the same number of points, and they are tied according to criteria 1 to 6 after having met in the last round of the mini-tournament, their rankings are determined by a penalty shoot-out (not used if more than two teams have the same number of points, or if their rankings are not relevant for qualification for the next stage).
8. Lower disciplinary points total based only on yellow and red cards received in the mini-tournament matches (red card = 3 points, yellow card = 1 point, expulsion for two yellow cards in one match = 3 points);
9. Higher position in the coefficient ranking list used for the qualifying round draw;
10. Drawing of lots.

To determine the best third-placed team from the qualifying round and the best runner-up from the elite round, the results against the teams in fourth place are discarded. The following criteria are applied (Regulations Article 15.01):

1. Higher number of points;
2. Superior goal difference;
3. Higher number of goals scored;
4. Lower disciplinary points total based only on yellow and red cards received (red card = 3 points, yellow card = 1 point, expulsion for two yellow cards in one match = 3 points);
5. Higher position in the coefficient ranking list used for the qualifying round draw;
6. Drawing of lots.

== Qualifying round ==
=== Draw ===
The draw for the qualifying round was held on 13 November 2015, 08:40 CET (UTC+1), at the UEFA headquarters in Nyon, Switzerland.

The teams were seeded according to their coefficient ranking, calculated based on the following:

- 2013 UEFA Women's Under-17 Championship final tournament and qualifying competition (qualifying round and elite round)
- 2014 UEFA Women's Under-17 Championship final tournament and qualifying competition (qualifying round and elite round)
- 2015 UEFA Women's Under-17 Championship final tournament and qualifying competition (qualifying round and elite round)

Each group contained one team from Pot A, one team from Pot B, one team from Pot C, and one team from Pot D. For political reasons, Russia and Ukraine (due to the Russian military intervention in Ukraine) could not be drawn in the same group.

Final tournament hosts: Team / Coeff / Rank; **Czech Republic** / 7.333 / —	Bye to elite round: Team / Coeff / Rank; **Spain** / 15.333 / 1

Teams entering qualifying round

Pot A
Team	Coeff	Rank
**France**	13.500	2
**Germany**	13.000	3
**Norway**	8.833	4
Austria	8.833	5
Switzerland	8.500	6
Belgium	8.500	7
Sweden	8.500	8
Italy	8.333	9
Poland	7.833	10
**Republic of Ireland**	7.667	11
**England**	7.500	12

Pot B
Team	Coeff	Rank
Scotland	7.000	13
Denmark	6.833	14
Iceland	6.833	15
**Netherlands**	6.667	16
Finland	6.167	17
Russia	6.167	18
Hungary	5.167	19
Turkey	5.000	20
Serbia	4.833	21
Northern Ireland	4.667	22
Greece	4.667	23

Pot C
Team	Coeff	Rank
Belarus	4.000	24
Portugal	3.833	25
Slovakia	3.167	26
Wales	3.000	27
Bulgaria	3.000	28
Romania	2.833	29
Bosnia and Herzegovina	2.333	30
Slovenia	2.333	31
Croatia	2.000	32
Azerbaijan	2.000	33
Montenegro	2.000	34

Pot D
Team	Coeff	Rank
Ukraine	1.333	35
Israel	1.000	36
Macedonia	1.000	37
Lithuania	0.333	38
Latvia	0.333	39
Moldova	0.333	40
Faroe Islands	0.000	41
Estonia	0.000	42
Kazakhstan	0.000	43
Georgia	0.000	44
Malta	—	45

Notes

- Teams marked in **bold** have qualified for the final tournament.

Did not enter
Albania
Andorra
Armenia
Cyprus
Gibraltar
Liechtenstein
Luxembourg
San Marino

=== Groups ===
The qualifying round must be played between 1 September and 31 October 2016.

Times up to 29 October 2016 are CEST (UTC+2), thereafter times are CET (UTC+1).

==== Group 1 ====
Pos	Team	Pld	W	D	L	GF	GA	GD	Pts	Qualification
1	Denmark	3	3	0	0	12	2	+10	**9**	Elite round
2	Switzerland	3	2	0	1	5	4	+1	**6**	Elite round
3	Slovakia	3	1	0	2	2	9	−7	**3**	
4	Israel (H)	3	0	0	3	0	4	−4	**0**	

Source: UEFA
Rules for classification: Qualification tiebreakers
(H) Hosts
20 September 2016
10:00

Slovakia	1–6	Denmark
Žemberyová 44'	Report	Snerle 4', 14'; Johansen 27'; Hashemi 60'; Hashmi 64'; Herdel 80+3'

Shefayim National Team Complex 2, Shefayim
Referee: Ifeoma Kulmala (Finland)
20 September 2016
16:00

Switzerland	1–0	Israel
Gut 30'	Report

Shefayim National Team Complex, Shefayim
Referee: Liudmyla Telbukh (Ukraine)

22 September 2016
10:00

Switzerland	3–0	Slovakia
Schärz 18'; Piubel 40+2'; Djeaid 78'	Report

Shefayim National Team Complex 2, Shefayim
Referee: Galiya Echeva (Bulgaria)
22 September 2016
16:00

Denmark	2–0	Israel
Johansen 31'; Pedersen 46'	Report

Shefayim National Team Complex, Shefayim
Referee: Ifeoma Kulmala (Finland)

25 September 2016
16:00

Denmark	4–1	Switzerland
Grøn 17'; Hashemi 21', 59'; Pedersen 80+3'	Report	Schassberger 23' (pen.)

Ramat Gan Stadium, Ramat Gan
Referee: Galiya Echeva (Bulgaria)
25 September 2016
16:00

Israel	0–1	Slovakia
	Report	Bogorová 44'

Shefayim National Team Complex, Shefayim
Referee: Liudmyla Telbukh (Ukraine)

==== Group 2 ====
Pos	Team	Pld	W	D	L	GF	GA	GD	Pts	Qualification
1	Greece (H)	3	2	1	0	7	1	+6	**7**	Elite round
2	Sweden	3	2	1	0	6	2	+4	**7**	Elite round
3	Malta	3	1	0	2	2	6	−4	**3**	
4	Montenegro	3	0	0	3	2	8	−6	**0**	

Source: UEFA
Rules for classification: Qualification tiebreakers
(H) Hosts
6 October 2016
12:00

Sweden	3–0	Malta
Engström 16'; Nyberg 64'; Persson 72'	Report

Pampeloponnisiako Stadium, Patras
Referee: Ruzanna Petrosyan (Armenia)
6 October 2016
15:00

Montenegro	0–4	Greece
	Report	Georgantzi 7', 32', 40+2'; Karapetsa 79'

Papacharalambeio National Stadium, Nafpaktos
Referee: Jurgita Mačikunytė (Lithuania)

8 October 2016
12:00

Sweden	2–1	Montenegro
Kapocs 46'; Hyttinen 75'	Report	Vujadinović 33'

Papacharalambeio National Stadium, Nafpaktos
Referee: Angelika Söder (Germany)
8 October 2016
15:00

Greece	2–0	Malta
Palama 24'; Karapetsa 31'	Report

Pampeloponnisiako Stadium, Patras
Referee: Jurgita Mačikunytė (Lithuania)

11 October 2016
15:00

Greece	1–1	Sweden
Karapetsa 63'	Report	Lenir 23'

Papacharalambeio National Stadium, Nafpaktos
Referee: Angelika Söder (Germany)
11 October 2016
15:00

Malta	2–1	Montenegro
Farrugia 5', 37'	Report	Golović 41'

Pampeloponnisiako Stadium, Patras
Referee: Ruzanna Petrosyan (Armenia)

==== Group 3 ====
Pos	Team	Pld	W	D	L	GF	GA	GD	Pts	Qualification
1	Poland	3	2	1	0	13	2	+11	**7**	Elite round
2	Hungary (H)	3	2	1	0	8	3	+5	**7**	Elite round
3	Azerbaijan	3	1	0	2	1	7	−6	**3**	
4	Estonia	3	0	0	3	1	11	−10	**0**	

Source: UEFA
Rules for classification: Qualification tiebreakers
(H) Hosts
8 October 2016
15:00

Poland	7–0	Estonia
Kowalczyk 16', 37'; Materek 32' (pen.); Helińska 47'; Iwaśko 70', 73'; Jedlińska 77'	Report

Király Sportlétesítmény, Szombathely
Referee: Aleksandra Česen (Slovenia)
8 October 2016
15:00

Azerbaijan	0–3	Hungary
	Report	Dorner 19', 80+2'; Pusztai 78'

Sportcentrum Bük, Bük
Referee: Anastasia Romanyuk (Ukraine)

10 October 2016
15:00

Poland	4–0	Azerbaijan
Filipczak 1', 9'; Legowski 17'; Materek 36' (pen.)	Report

Király Sportlétesítmény, Szombathely
Referee: Andromachi Tsiofliki (Greece)
10 October 2016
15:00

Hungary	3–1	Estonia
Dorner 27'; Králik 38', 64'	Report	Šilina 73' (pen.)

Sportcentrum Bük, Bük
Referee: Anastasia Romanyuk (Ukraine)

13 October 2016
15:00

Hungary	2–2	Poland
Stasiak 4' (o.g.); Vachter 25'	Report	Materek 36' (pen.); Kowalczyk 65'

Sportcentrum Bük, Bük
Referee: Andromachi Tsiofliki (Greece)
13 October 2016
15:00

Estonia	0–1	Azerbaijan
	Report	Nematova 13'

Király Sportlétesítmény, Szombathely
Referee: Aleksandra Česen (Slovenia)

==== Group 4 ====
Pos	Team	Pld	W	D	L	GF	GA	GD	Pts	Qualification
1	Norway	3	3	0	0	12	0	+12	**9**	Elite round
2	Netherlands	3	2	0	1	24	2	+22	**6**	Elite round
3	Bulgaria	3	1	0	2	1	15	−14	**3**	
4	Moldova (H)	3	0	0	3	0	20	−20	**0**	

Source: UEFA
Rules for classification: Qualification tiebreakers
(H) Hosts
21 October 2016
13:00

Norway	6–0	Moldova
Birkeli 1', 7', 20'; Olsen 27'; Aalstad Bækkelund 37'; Sunde 80'	Report

Zimbru-2 Stadium, Chișinău
Referee: Bojana Tošić (Bosnia and Herzegovina)
21 October 2016
13:00

Bulgaria	0–11	Netherlands
	Report	Smits 6', 16', 24', 25', 51', 58', 62'; Baijings 33'; Casparij 40+1'; Leuchter 45'; Ursem 55'

CSR Orhei, Orhei
Referee: Hannelore Onsea (Belgium)

23 October 2016
13:00

Norway	4–0	Bulgaria
Birkeli 5'; Sunde 9' (pen.); Rogde 16'; Bjørneboe 40+5'	Report

CSR Orhei, Orhei
Referee: Valentina Garoffolo (Italy)
23 October 2016
13:00

Netherlands	13–0	Moldova
Van de Westeringh 5', 15'; Smits 7', 23', 26'; Mesina 19' (o.g.); Baijings 30'; Van Veldhoven 39'; Leuchter 45', 52', 58'; Wilms 68'; Speelman 72'	Report

Zimbru-2 Stadium, Chișinău
Referee: Hannelore Onsea (Belgium)

26 October 2016
13:00

Netherlands	0–2	Norway
	Report	Bjelde 20'; Rogde 72'

CSR Orhei, Orhei
Referee: Valentina Garoffolo (Italy)
26 October 2016
13:00

Moldova	0–1	Bulgaria
	Report	Mardari 63' (o.g.)

Zimbru-2 Stadium, Chișinău
Referee: Bojana Tošić (Bosnia and Herzegovina)

==== Group 5 ====
Pos	Team	Pld	W	D	L	GF	GA	GD	Pts	Qualification
1	Portugal (H)	3	1	2	0	9	2	+7	**5**	Elite round
2	Italy	3	1	2	0	9	1	+8	**5 (Note: Tie broken by disciplinary points.)**	Elite round
3	Finland	3	1	2	0	9	1	+8	**5**	
4	Georgia	3	0	0	3	0	23	−23	**0**	

Source: UEFA
Rules for classification: Qualification tiebreakers
(H) Hosts
Notes:
26 October 2016
15:00

Italy	8–0	Georgia
Cafferata 13', 38'; Porcarelli 16', 74'; Crespi 21'; Polli 24'; Soffia 26'; Bardin 28'	Report

Estádio Nacional, Oeiras
Referee: Sabayel Gurbanova (Azerbaijan)
26 October 2016
19:00

Portugal	1–1	Finland
Teles 23'	Report	Enkkilä 71' (pen.)

Cidade do Futebol, Oeiras
Referee: Rebecca Welch (England)

28 October 2016
15:00

Finland	8–0	Georgia
Tuominen 9', 44'; Smirnoff 22', 75'; Lehtilä 30', 48'; Lehtonen 47'; Kainulainen 76'	Report

Cidade do Futebol, Oeiras
Referee: Rebecca Welch (England)
28 October 2016
17:00

Italy	1–1	Portugal
Baldi 20'	Report	Monteiro 29'

Estádio Municipal de Mafra, Mafra
Referee: Liliya Hasanova (Kazakhstan)

31 October 2016
16:00

Finland	0–0	Italy
	Report

Estádio Municipal de Mafra, Mafra
Referee: Liliya Hasanova (Kazakhstan)
31 October 2016
16:00

Georgia	0–7	Portugal
	Report	Faria 1', 40+1'; Martins 6', 10'; Macedo 55', 59', 61'

Estádio Nacional, Oeiras
Referee: Sabayel Gurbanova (Azerbaijan)

==== Group 6 ====
Pos	Team	Pld	W	D	L	GF	GA	GD	Pts	Qualification
1	France	3	3	0	0	25	0	+25	**9**	Elite round
2	Scotland (H)	3	2	0	1	12	4	+8	**6**	Elite round
3	Croatia	3	1	0	2	3	8	−5	**3**	
4	Kazakhstan	3	0	0	3	0	28	−28	**0**	

Source: UEFA
Rules for classification: Qualification tiebreakers
(H) Hosts
10 October 2016
16:00

France	17–0	Kazakhstan
Ivanyuk 2' (o.g.); Martin 4', 41', 44', 78'; Malard 10', 13', 18', 21', 30', 79'; Chotard 16'; Ribeiro de Carvalho 17'; Bacha 22', 40'; Cardia 63'; Philippe 67'	Report

Oriam National Performance Centre, Edinburgh
Referee: Reelika Turi (Estonia)
10 October 2016
20:30

Croatia	0–4	Scotland
	Report	McAlpine 13'; Cross 31', 79', 80+3'

Oriam National Performance Centre, Edinburgh
Referee: Vera Onică (Moldova)

12 October 2016
14:00

France	4–0	Croatia
Ribeiro de Carvalho 16'; Pimentel 76'; Martin 78'; Bacha 80+2'	Report

Oriam National Performance Centre, Edinburgh
Referee: Cathrine Eide (Norway)
12 October 2016
18:30

Scotland	8–0	Kazakhstan
Callaghan 2', 10', 16'; McAlonie 45'; Santoyo-Brown 53'; McDonald 62', 74'; Muir 67'	Report

Oriam National Performance Centre, Edinburgh
Referee: Vera Onică (Moldova)

15 October 2016
14:00

Scotland	0–4	France
	Report	Lakrar 6'; Malard 28', 32', 40+1'

Ainslie Park, Edinburgh
Referee: Cathrine Eide (Norway)
15 October 2016
14:00

Kazakhstan	0–3	Croatia
	Report	Klarić 3'; Spajić 19', 43'

Oriam National Performance Centre, Edinburgh
Referee: Reelika Turi (Estonia)

==== Group 7 ====
Pos	Team	Pld	W	D	L	GF	GA	GD	Pts	Qualification
1	Germany	3	3	0	0	16	0	+16	**9**	Elite round
2	Wales	3	1	1	1	3	8	−5	**4**	Elite round
3	Turkey	3	1	0	2	3	7	−4	**3**	
4	Latvia (H)	3	0	1	2	2	9	−7	**1**	

Source: UEFA
Rules for classification: Qualification tiebreakers
(H) Hosts
2 October 2016
11:00

Wales	2–1	Turkey
Morgan 8'; Griffiths 75'	Report	İncik 27'

Rīgas Hanzas vidusskola, Riga
Attendance: 35
Referee: Chryso Georgiou (Cyprus)
2 October 2016
15:00

Germany	6–0	Latvia
Anyomi 3', 21'; Uebach 40'; Riepl 43'; Gudorf 55'; Rackow 60'	Report

Rīgas Hanzas vidusskola, Riga
Attendance: 105
Referee: Nadezhda Belcheva (Bulgaria)

4 October 2016
11:00

Germany	6–0	Wales
Rackow 7', 50'; Kössler 11'; Nüsken 67', 72'; Krumbiegel 76'	Report

Rīgas Hanzas vidusskola, Riga
Attendance: 37
Referee: Ewa Augustyn (Poland)
4 October 2016
15:00

Turkey	2–1	Latvia
S. Öztürk 48'; Sadıkoğlu 72'	Report	Gudkova 55'

Rīgas Hanzas vidusskola, Riga
Attendance: 50
Referee: Chryso Georgiou (Cyprus)

7 October 2016
11:00

Turkey	0–4	Germany
	Report	Anyomi 3' (pen.); Kössler 21'; Rackow 53'; Brunner 78'

Ogres pilsētas stadions, Ogre
Attendance: 17
Referee: Ewa Augustyn (Poland)
7 October 2016
11:00

Latvia	1–1	Wales
Morphet 73' (o.g.)	Report	Horrell 19'

Rīgas Hanzas vidusskola, Riga
Attendance: 20
Referee: Nadezhda Belcheva (Bulgaria)

==== Group 8 ====
Pos	Team	Pld	W	D	L	GF	GA	GD	Pts	Qualification
1	England	3	2	0	1	15	1	+14	**6**	Elite round
2	Slovenia	3	2	0	1	4	1	+3	**6**	Elite round
3	Russia	3	2	0	1	3	1	+2	**6**	Elite round
4	Lithuania (H)	3	0	0	3	0	19	−19	**0**	

Source: UEFA
Rules for classification: Qualification tiebreakers
(H) Hosts
24 October 2016
13:00

Slovenia	0–1	Russia
	Report	Abdullina 14'

Sūduva Stadium, Marijampolė
Referee: Ifeoma Kulmala (Finland)
24 October 2016
16:00

England	14–0	Lithuania
Hemp 4' (pen.), 17', 21', 66'; Douglas 10', 31', 32', 38'; Taylor 22'; Neville 23'; Syme 46', 55'; Ngunga 59', 62'	Report

Darius and Girėnas Stadium, Kaunas
Referee: Sibel Kolçak (Turkey)

26 October 2016
13:00

England	0–1	Slovenia
	Report	Mori 16'

Sūduva Stadium, Marijampolė
Referee: Cristina Bujor (Romania)
26 October 2016
16:00

Russia	2–0	Lithuania
Rubtsova 38'; Cherkasova 66'	Report

Darius and Girėnas Stadium, Kaunas
Referee: Ifeoma Kulmala (Finland)

29 October 2016
13:00

Russia	0–1	England
	Report	Ngunga 63'

Sūduva Stadium, Marijampolė
Referee: Cristina Bujor (Romania)
29 October 2016
13:00

Lithuania	0–3	Slovenia
	Report	Mori 21'; Vindišar 36', 48'

Darius and Girėnas Stadium, Kaunas
Referee: Sibel Kolçak (Turkey)

==== Group 9 ====
Pos	Team	Pld	W	D	L	GF	GA	GD	Pts	Qualification
1	Belgium	3	2	0	1	5	1	+4	**6**	Elite round
2	Serbia (H)	3	1	1	1	2	2	0	**4**	Elite round
3	Ukraine	3	1	1	1	3	6	−3	**4**	
4	Romania	3	1	0	2	2	3	−1	**3**	

Source: UEFA
Rules for classification: Qualification tiebreakers
(H) Hosts
26 September 2016
15:00

Belgium	4–0	Ukraine
Jacobs 19', 21'; Knapen 24' (pen.); Petry 54'	Report

Suvača Sportcenter, Pećinci
Referee: Meitar Shemesh (Israel)
26 September 2016
15:00

Romania	0–1	Serbia
	Report	Frajtović 13'

Sports Center of FA of Serbia, Stara Pazova
Referee: Svetlana Cebanu (Moldova)

28 September 2016
15:00

Belgium	0–1	Romania
	Report	Sfiea 16'

Sports Center of FA of Serbia, Stara Pazova
Referee: Irina Turovskaya (Belarus)
28 September 2016
15:00

Serbia	1–1	Ukraine
Agbaba 50'	Report	Semenyuk 40+1'

Suvača Sportcenter, Pećinci
Referee: Svetlana Cebanu (Moldova)

1 October 2016
15:00

Serbia	0–1	Belgium
	Report	Petry 44'

Sports Center of FA of Serbia, Stara Pazova
Referee: Irina Turovskaya (Belarus)
1 October 2016
15:00

Ukraine	2–1	Romania
Kunina 17'; Kozlova 62'	Report	Boroș 58' (pen.)

Suvača Sportcenter, Pećinci
Referee: Meitar Shemesh (Israel)

==== Group 10 ====
Pos	Team	Pld	W	D	L	GF	GA	GD	Pts	Qualification
1	Republic of Ireland (H)	3	3	0	0	12	1	+11	**9**	Elite round
2	Iceland	3	2	0	1	9	4	+5	**6**	Elite round
3	Faroe Islands	3	1	0	2	2	11	−9	**3**	
4	Belarus	3	0	0	3	1	8	−7	**0**	

Source: UEFA
Rules for classification: Qualification tiebreakers
(H) Hosts
26 October 2016
16:00

Belarus	0–4	Iceland
	Report	Jónsdóttir 11', 48'; Eiríksdóttir 26'; Vilhjálmsdóttir 32'

The Mardyke, Cork
Referee: Sandra Strub (Switzerland)
26 October 2016
20:00

Republic of Ireland	6–0	Faroe Islands
McEvoy 12', 25'; McManus 66', 72', 80+4'; Casey 80+2'	Report

Turners Cross, Cork
Referee: Irena Velevačkoska (Macedonia)

28 October 2016
16:00

Iceland	4–0	Faroe Islands
Jóhannesdóttir 34', 47'; Eiríksdóttir 42', 80+3'	Report

The Mardyke, Cork
Referee: Sandra Strub (Switzerland)
28 October 2016
20:00

Republic of Ireland	2–0	Belarus
McManus 11'; Casey 41'	Report

Turners Cross, Cork
Referee: Melis Özçiğdem (Turkey)

31 October 2016
20:00

Iceland	1–4	Republic of Ireland
Eiríksdóttir 23'	Report	McManus 39'; Steinarsdóttir 50' (o.g.); Mackey 69', 75'

Turners Cross, Cork
Referee: Melis Özçiğdem (Turkey)
31 October 2016
20:00

Faroe Islands	2–1	Belarus
Rasmusdóttir 3', 21'	Report	Hirchyts 19'

St Colman's Park, Cobh
Referee: Irena Velevačkoska (Macedonia)

==== Group 11 ====
Pos	Team	Pld	W	D	L	GF	GA	GD	Pts	Qualification
1	Austria	3	3	0	0	15	1	+14	**9**	Elite round
2	Bosnia and Herzegovina	3	2	0	1	9	4	+5	**6**	Elite round
3	Northern Ireland	3	1	0	2	4	8	−4	**3**	
4	Macedonia (H)	3	0	0	3	0	15	−15	**0**	

Source: UEFA
Rules for classification: Qualification tiebreakers
(H) Hosts
30 September 2016
15:00

Austria	7–0	Macedonia
Degen 5', 54'; Scharnböck 11', 15'; Kurz 13' (pen.), 55'; Kolb 24'	Report

Training Centre Petar Miloševski, Skopje
Referee: Iuliana Demetrescu (Romania)
30 September 2016
15:00

Bosnia and Herzegovina	4–0	Northern Ireland
Hrelja 17', 43'; Habibović 29'; Gavrić 64'	Report

Boris Trajkovski Stadium, Skopje
Referee: Neslihan Muratdağı (Turkey)

2 October 2016
15:00

Austria	4–1	Bosnia and Herzegovina
Höbinger 20', 65'; Scharnböck 27'; Mak 37'	Report	Gavrić 44'

Boris Trajkovski Stadium, Skopje
Referee: Sílvia Domingos (Portugal)
2 October 2016
15:00

Northern Ireland	4–0	Macedonia
Smyth 10'; Bell 16'; Magee 50'; Wilson 55'	Report

Training Centre Petar Miloševski, Skopje
Referee: Neslihan Muratdağı (Turkey)

5 October 2016
15:00

Northern Ireland	0–4	Austria
	Report	Scharnböck 51'; Kolb 62', 67'; Höbinger 80'

Boris Trajkovski Stadium, Skopje
Referee: Sílvia Domingos (Portugal)
5 October 2016
15:00

Macedonia	0–4	Bosnia and Herzegovina
	Report	Gavrić 12'; Hrelja 14'; Hamzić 33'; Gačanica 72'

Training Centre Petar Miloševski, Skopje
Referee: Iuliana Demetrescu (Romania)

=== Ranking of third-placed teams ===
To determine the best third-placed team from the qualifying round which advance to the elite round, only the results of the third-placed teams against the first and second-placed teams in their group are taken into account.

Pos	Grp	Team	Pld	W	D	L	GF	GA	GD	Pts	Qualification
1	8	Russia	2	1	0	1	1	1	0	3	Elite round
2	5	Finland	2	0	2	0	1	1	0	2	
3	9	Ukraine	2	0	1	1	1	5	−4	1	
4	7	Turkey	2	0	0	2	1	6	−5	0	
5	2	Malta	2	0	0	2	0	5	−5	0	
6	3	Azerbaijan	2	0	0	2	0	7	−7	0	
7	1	Slovakia	2	0	0	2	1	9	−8	0	
8	11	Northern Ireland	2	0	0	2	0	8	−8	0 (Note: Tie broken by disciplinary points.)	
9	6	Croatia	2	0	0	2	0	8	−8	0	
10	10	Faroe Islands	2	0	0	2	0	10	−10	0	
11	4	Bulgaria	2	0	0	2	0	15	−15	0	

Source: UEFA
Rules for classification: 1) points; 2) goal difference; 3) goals scored; 4) disciplinary points; 5) coefficient; 6) drawing of lots.

== Elite round ==
=== Draw ===
The draw for the elite round was held on 11 November 2016, 11:40 CET (UTC+1), at the UEFA headquarters in Nyon, Switzerland.

The teams were seeded according to their results in the qualifying round. Spain, which received a bye to the elite round, were automatically seeded into Pot A. Each group contained one team from Pot A, one team from Pot B, one team from Pot C, and one team from Pot D. Teams from the same qualifying round group could not be drawn in the same group.

Pos	Grp	Team	Pld	W	D	L	GF	GA	GD	Pts	Seeding
1	—	Spain	0	0	0	0	0	0	0	0	Pot A
2	6	France	3	3	0	0	25	0	+25	9	Pot A
3	7	Germany	3	3	0	0	16	0	+16	9	Pot A
4	11	Austria	3	3	0	0	15	1	+14	9	Pot A
5	4	Norway	3	3	0	0	12	0	+12	9	Pot A
6	10	Republic of Ireland	3	3	0	0	12	1	+11	9	Pot A
7	1	Denmark	3	3	0	0	12	2	+10	9	Pot B
8	3	Poland	3	2	1	0	13	2	+11	7	Pot B
9	2	Greece	3	2	1	0	7	1	+6	7	Pot B
10	3	Hungary	3	2	1	0	8	3	+5	7	Pot B
11	2	Sweden	3	2	1	0	6	2	+4	7	Pot B
12	4	Netherlands	3	2	0	1	24	2	+22	6	Pot B
13	8	England	3	2	0	1	15	1	+14	6	Pot C
14	6	Scotland	3	2	0	1	12	4	+8	6	Pot C
15	10	Iceland	3	2	0	1	9	4	+5	6 (Note: Tie broken by disciplinary points.)	Pot C
16	11	Bosnia and Herzegovina	3	2	0	1	9	4	+5	6	Pot C
17	9	Belgium	3	2	0	1	5	1	+4	6	Pot C
18	8	Slovenia	3	2	0	1	4	1	+3	6	Pot C
19	8	Russia	3	2	0	1	3	1	+2	6	Pot D
20	1	Switzerland	3	2	0	1	5	4	+1	6	Pot D
21	5	Italy	3	1	2	0	9	1	+8	5	Pot D
22	5	Portugal	3	1	2	0	9	2	+7	5	Pot D
23	9	Serbia	3	1	1	1	2	2	0	4	Pot D
24	7	Wales	3	1	1	1	3	8	−5	4	Pot D

Source: UEFA
Rules for classification: 1) points; 2) goal difference; 3) goals scored; 4) disciplinary points; 5) coefficient; 6) drawing of lots.

=== Groups ===
The elite round must be played between 1 February and 2 April 2017.

Times up to 25 March 2017 are CET (UTC+1), thereafter times are CEST (UTC+2).

==== Group 1 ====
Pos	Team	Pld	W	D	L	GF	GA	GD	Pts	Qualification
1	Netherlands (H)	3	2	1	0	6	2	+4	7	Final tournament
2	Slovenia	3	2	0	1	3	4	−1	6	
3	Switzerland	3	1	1	1	4	3	+1	4	
4	Austria	3	0	0	3	1	5	−4	0	

Source: UEFA
Rules for classification: Qualification tiebreakers
(H) Hosts
27 March 2017
17:00

Austria	0–2	Switzerland
	Report	Guede Redondo 29'; Schärz 59'

Sportpark De Hanen Weide, Veen
Referee: Marina Višnjić (Serbia)
27 March 2017
19:30

Slovenia	0–3	Netherlands
	Report	Wilms 25'; Leuchter 48'; Doorn 59'

Sportpark De Watertoren, Zaltbommel
Referee: Melis Özçiğdem (Turkey)

29 March 2017
17:00

Austria	0–1	Slovenia
	Report	Pintarič 72'

Sportpark De Hanen Weide, Veen
Referee: Graziella Pirriatore (Italy)
29 March 2017
19:30

Netherlands	1–1	Switzerland
Casparij 7'	Report	Gut 63'

Sportpark De Watertoren, Zaltbommel
Referee: Melis Özçiğdem (Turkey)

1 April 2017
15:00

Netherlands	2–1	Austria
Leuchter 24' (pen.); Ter Beek 39'	Report	Degen 34'

Sportpark De Hanen Weide, Veen
Referee: Graziella Pirriatore (Italy)
1 April 2017
15:00

Switzerland	1–2	Slovenia
Piubel 53'	Report	Česnik 62'; Korošec 80+2'

Sportpark De Watertoren, Zaltbommel
Referee: Marina Višnjić (Serbia)

==== Group 2 ====
Pos	Team	Pld	W	D	L	GF	GA	GD	Pts	Qualification
1	Norway	3	3	0	0	16	3	+13	9	Final tournament
2	Denmark	3	2	0	1	5	7	−2	6	
3	Wales	3	1	0	2	2	10	−8	3	
4	Bosnia and Herzegovina (H)	3	0	0	3	2	5	−3	0	

Source: UEFA
Rules for classification: Qualification tiebreakers
(H) Hosts
20 March 2017
15:00

Norway	8–1	Wales
Olsen 3', 24', 58'; Griffin 11', 55'; Sørum 46'; Birkeli 53'; Terland 66'	Report	Morgan 22'

Stadion Otoka, Sarajevo
Referee: Triinu Laos (Estonia)
20 March 2017
15:00

Bosnia and Herzegovina	1–2	Denmark
Bakalar 19'	Report	Herdel 44'; Hashemi 78'

Stadion Mladost Kakanj, Kakanj
Referee: Ewa Augustyn (Poland)

22 March 2017
15:00

Norway	2–1	Bosnia and Herzegovina
Nygård 50'; Griffin 71'	Report	Gačanica 21'

Stadion Mladost Kakanj, Kakanj
Referee: Elvira Nurmustafina (Kazakhstan)
22 March 2017
15:00

Denmark	2–0	Wales
Steenberg 10'; Herdel 60'	Report

Stadion Otoka, Sarajevo
Referee: Ewa Augustyn (Poland)

25 March 2017
15:00

Denmark	1–6	Norway
Johansen 80+2'	Report	Tennebø 3'; Tvedten 6'; Sunde 15'; Terland 32'; Olsen 36', 40+2'

Stadion Mladost Kakanj, Kakanj
Referee: Elvira Nurmustafina (Kazakhstan)
25 March 2017
15:00

Wales	1–0	Bosnia and Herzegovina
Vincze 46'	Report

Stadion Otoka, Sarajevo
Referee: Triinu Laos (Estonia)

==== Group 3 ====
Pos	Team	Pld	W	D	L	GF	GA	GD	Pts	Qualification
1	England (H)	3	2	1	0	4	1	+3	7	Final tournament
2	Germany	3	2	0	1	8	3	+5	6	Final tournament
3	Italy	3	1	1	1	3	3	0	4	
4	Poland	3	0	0	3	0	8	−8	0	

Source: UEFA
Rules for classification: Qualification tiebreakers
(H) Hosts
25 March 2017
15:00

Germany	3–1	Italy
Stolze 40+1', 70'; Anyomi 77'	Report	Baldi 39'

Keys Park, Hednesford
Referee: Tinna Høj Christensen (Denmark)
25 March 2017
15:00

England	2–0	Poland
Hemp 33'; Ravenscroft 68'	Report

New Bucks Head, Telford
Referee: Cathrine Eide (Norway)

27 March 2017
15:00

Germany	1–2	England
Wieder 13'	Report	Syme 2'; Ravenscroft 11'

New Bucks Head, Telford
Referee: Désirée Grundbacher (Switzerland)
27 March 2017
15:00

Poland	0–2	Italy
	Report	Baldi 12'; Bragonzi 77'

Keys Park, Hednesford
Referee: Cathrine Eide (Norway)

30 March 2017
15:00

Poland	0–4	Germany
	Report	Anyomi 21'; Stolze 39'; Schimmer 53'; Ebert 80+3'

New Bucks Head, Telford
Referee: Désirée Grundbacher (Switzerland)
30 March 2017
15:00

Italy	0–0	England
	Report

St George's Park Main Stadium, Burton-on-Trent
Referee: Tinna Høj Christensen (Denmark)

==== Group 4 ====
Pos	Team	Pld	W	D	L	GF	GA	GD	Pts	Qualification
1	Republic of Ireland	3	2	1	0	2	0	+2	7	Final tournament
2	Scotland	3	1	2	0	3	2	+1	5	
3	Hungary	3	1	1	1	2	2	0	4	
4	Serbia (H)	3	0	0	3	1	4	−3	0	

Source: UEFA
Rules for classification: Qualification tiebreakers
(H) Hosts
13 March 2017
14:00

Republic of Ireland	1–0	Serbia
McEvoy 78'	Report

Sports Center of FA of Serbia, Stara Pazova
Referee: Shona Shukrula (Netherlands)
13 March 2017
14:00

Scotland	1–1	Hungary
Cross 12'	Report	Tolnai 6'

Zemun Stadium, Belgrade
Referee: Meitar Shemesh (Israel)

15 March 2017
14:00

Republic of Ireland	0–0	Scotland
	Report

Zemun Stadium, Belgrade
Referee: Vera Opeykina (Russia)
15 March 2017
14:00

Hungary	1–0	Serbia
Pusztai 77'	Report

Sports Center of FA of Serbia, Stara Pazova
Referee: Meitar Shemesh (Israel)

18 March 2017
14:00

Hungary	0–1	Republic of Ireland
	Report	Payne 13'

Zemun Stadium, Belgrade
Referee: Vera Opeykina (Russia)
18 March 2017
14:00

Serbia	1–2	Scotland
Trbojević 9'	Report	McAlonie 27'; Davidson 45'

Sports Center of FA of Serbia, Stara Pazova
Referee: Shona Shukrula (Netherlands)

==== Group 5 ====
Pos	Team	Pld	W	D	L	GF	GA	GD	Pts	Qualification
1	France (H)	3	2	0	1	7	1	+6	6	Final tournament
2	Belgium	3	2	0	1	3	3	0	6	
3	Russia	3	1	0	2	2	6	−4	3	
4	Greece	3	1	0	2	1	3	−2	3	

Source: UEFA
Rules for classification: Qualification tiebreakers
(H) Hosts
24 March 2017
17:00

Belgium	1–0	Greece
Petry 47'	Report

Stade Saint-Exupéry, Marignane
Referee: Sílvia Domingos (Portugal)
24 March 2017
19:00

France	4–0	Russia
Martin 10' (pen.); Lakrar 37'; Bacha 43'; Cardia 78'	Report

Stade Francis Turcan, Martigues
Referee: Tanja Račić (Bosnia and Herzegovina)

26 March 2017
14:00

Greece	0–2	Russia
	Report	Cherkasova 38'; Boyko 69'

Stade Saint-Exupéry, Marignane
Referee: Sílvia Domingos (Portugal)
26 March 2017
16:00

France	3–0	Belgium
Roux 29'; Pimentel 71'; Delabre 78'	Report

Georges-Carcassonne Stadium, Aix-en-Provence
Referee: Marta Huerta De Aza (Spain)

29 March 2017
16:00

Greece	1–0	France
Georgantzi 31'	Report

Georges-Carcassonne Stadium, Aix-en-Provence
Referee: Marta Huerta De Aza (Spain)
29 March 2017
16:00

Russia	0–2	Belgium
	Report	Bey Temsamani 11'; Petry 75'

Stade Francis Turcan, Martigues
Referee: Tanja Račić (Bosnia and Herzegovina)

==== Group 6 ====
Pos	Team	Pld	W	D	L	GF	GA	GD	Pts	Qualification
1	Spain	3	2	1	0	10	2	+8	7	Final tournament
2	Iceland	3	2	0	1	5	4	+1	6	
3	Sweden	3	0	2	1	1	2	−1	2	
4	Portugal (H)	3	0	1	2	2	10	−8	1	

Source: UEFA
Rules for classification: Qualification tiebreakers
(H) Hosts
28 March 2017
15:00

Iceland	1–0	Sweden
Ragnarsdóttir 8'	Report

Estádio Nacional, Oeiras
Referee: Galiya Echeva (Bulgaria)
28 March 2017
17:00

Spain	6–1	Portugal
Pina 2', 5', 42'; Bautista 29'; Eizaguirre 33'; Marques 39' (o.g.)	Report	Encarnação 59'

Cidade do Futebol, Oeiras
Referee: Jelena Banjeglav (Serbia)

30 March 2017
16:00

Spain	3–0	Iceland
Bautista 62', 64'; Zugasti 76'	Report

Estádio Municipal de Mafra, Mafra
Referee: Cristina Bujor (Romania)
30 March 2017
17:00

Sweden	0–0	Portugal
	Report

Cidade do Futebol, Oeiras
Referee: Galiya Echeva (Bulgaria)

2 April 2017
17:00

Sweden	1–1	Spain
Pujadas 80+3' (o.g.)	Report	Aleixandri 25'

Estádio Nacional, Oeiras
Referee: Cristina Bujor (Romania)
2 April 2017
17:00

Portugal	1–4	Iceland
Faria 28'	Report	Jóhannsdóttir 59', 67', 73'; Jónsdóttir 66'

Cidade do Futebol, Oeiras
Referee: Jelena Banjeglav (Serbia)

=== Ranking of second-placed teams ===
To determine the best second-placed team from the elite round which qualify for the final tournament, only the results of the second-placed teams against the first and third-placed teams in their group are taken into account.

Pos	Grp	Team	Pld	W	D	L	GF	GA	GD	Pts	Qualification
1	3	Germany	2	1	0	1	4	3	+1	3	Final tournament
2	5	Belgium	2	1	0	1	2	3	−1	3	
3	1	Slovenia	2	1	0	1	2	4	−2	3	
4	6	Iceland	2	1	0	1	1	3	−2	3	
5	2	Denmark	2	1	0	1	3	6	−3	3	
6	4	Scotland	2	0	2	0	1	1	0	2	

Source: UEFA
Rules for classification: 1) points; 2) goal difference; 3) goals scored; 4) disciplinary points; 5) coefficient; 6) drawing of lots.

== Qualified teams ==
The following eight teams qualify for the final tournament.

Team	Qualified as	Qualified on	Previous appearances in tournament^{1}
Czech Republic	Hosts	26 January 2015	1 (2016)
Netherlands	Elite round Group 1 winners	1 April 2017	1 (2010)
Norway	Elite round Group 2 winners	25 March 2017	3 (2009, 2015, 2016)
England	Elite round Group 3 winners	30 March 2017	4 (2008, 2014, 2015, 2016)
Republic of Ireland	Elite round Group 4 winners	18 March 2017	2 (2010, 2015)
France	Elite round Group 5 winners	26 March 2017	6 (2008, 2009, 2011, 2012, 2014, 2015)
Spain	Elite round Group 6 winners	30 March 2017	7 (2009, **2010**, **2011**, 2013, 2014, **2015**, 2016)
Germany	Elite round best runners-up	2 April 2017	8 (**2008**, **2009**, 2010, 2011, **2012**, **2014**, 2015, **2016**)

^{1} Bold indicates champion for that year. Italic indicates host for that year.

== Top goalscorers ==
The following players scored four goals or more in the qualifying competition:

10 goals

- (Netherlands) Joëlle Smits

9 goals

- (France) Melvine Malard

6 goals

- (France) Laurène Martin
- (Netherlands) Romée Leuchter
- (Norway) Jenny Kristine Røsholm Olsen

5 goals

- (England) Lauren Hemp
- (Germany) Nicole Anyomi
- (Norway) Vilde Birkeli
- (Republic of Ireland) Carla McManus

4 goals

- (Austria) Jana Scharnböck
- (Belgium) Lisa Petry
- (Denmark) Dajan Hashemi
- (England) Nicole Douglas
- (France) Selma Bacha
- (Germany) Gianna Rackow
- (Greece) Ifigeneia Georgantzi
- (Iceland) Hlín Eiríksdóttir
- (Scotland) Morgan Cross

Source: UEFA.com
