= PAS Pyrgos 1968 (women) =

Greek women's association football club

- Full name: Podosfairikos Athlitikos Syllogos Pyrgos 1968 (Ποδοσφαιρικός Αθλητικός Σύλλογος Πύργος 1968)
- Nickname: Ερυθρόλευκες (The Red-and-Whites)
- Short name: PAS Pyrgos, Pyrgos AFC
- Founded: 2025 (as the women's section of PAS Pyrgos 1968)
- Ground: Pyrgos Municipal Stadium "Charalambos Vilaetis"
- Capacity: 6,750
- Owner: Aris Oikonomou
- Chairman: Dionysis Theodorakopoulos
- Manager: Elena Kouskouni
- League: Greek A Division
- 2025–26: B Division, Group 2, 1st (promoted)
Home colours	Away colours

PAS Pyrgos 1968, also known by its English name Pyrgos AFC, is a Greek women's association football club based in Pyrgos, Elis. It is the women's section of PAS Pyrgos 1968 and competes in the Greek A Division, the top tier of women's football in Greece, having won promotion in consecutive seasons in 2025 and 2026.

== History ==
=== Background ===
The parent club traces its identity to Paniliakos, the historic club of Pyrgos. In 2023, supporters concerned about Paniliakos's administrative and financial situation formed a new club, PAS Pyrgos 2023. In July 2025 it joined forces with A.P.O. Thyella Katarrachiou Pyrgou, whose general assembly voted to change the club's name to PAS Pyrgos 1968, backed by Greek-American businessman Aris Oikonomou. The Hellenic Football Federation (EPO) later approved the new name, with "PAS Pyrgos" as the distinctive title and "Pyrgos AFC" as the foreign-language title.

=== Rise through the divisions (2024–2026) ===
In the 2024–25 season, the team, then playing as Thyella Pyrgou, won Group 3 of the Greek C Division and was promoted to the B Division.

Competing as PAS Pyrgos in the 2025–26 B Division, the team won Group 2. It won its first 15 league matches, scoring 76 goals and conceding two, clinched the title with a win away to Zakynthos, and lost only on the final matchday.

As group winners, PAS Pyrgos faced Group 4 champions A.O. Vrilissia in a promotion play-off at the Aigio Municipal Stadium, coached by Andreas Tryfonopoulos and Iraklis Tsipis. Pyrgos won 1–0 with a ninth-minute header from Montenegrin international Tatjana Đurković, from a free kick taken by Torrealba, securing promotion to the A Division for the first time. The trophy was presented by EPO vice-president Vicky Dimitrakopoulou-Kouloura.

=== A Division (2026–present) ===
Pyrgos entered the 2026–27 A Division, a single 12-team group played over 22 rounds with no play-offs. They signed prominent players such as New Zealand International Jana Radosavljević. Former Volos coach Elena Kouskouni had taken charge of the team in July 2026. The club's first top-flight match was a 4–0 defeat away to Panathinaikos on 19 September 2026, followed by a 2–0 home loss to Asteras Tripolis. On 18 October 2026 the team recorded its first A Division win, 2–1 away to OFI, coming from behind with a 70th-minute header from Anastasija Ročāne and a stoppage-time winner from Daniela Torrealba.

== Stadium ==
The team is registered with the Pyrgos Municipal Stadium as its home ground, the "Charalambos Vilaetis" stadium, which has a capacity of 6,750 and is shared with the club's men's team.

== Season-by-season ==
Season	Division	Tier	Position	Notes
2024–25	C Division, Group 3	3	1st	Promoted (as Thyella Pyrgou)
2025–26	B Division, Group 2	2	1st	Won promotion play-off vs A.O. Vrilissia (1–0)
2026–27	A Division	1	In progress	

== Honours ==
- Greek B Division
  - Group 2 winners (1): 2025–26
- Greek C Division
  - Group 3 winners (1): 2024–25

== Players ==
=== Current squad ===
As of 19 October 2026 Note: Flags indicate national team as defined under FIFA eligibility rules; some limited exceptions apply. Players may hold more than one non-FIFA nationality.

No.	Pos.	Nation	Player
1	GK	COL	Sofía Buitrago
3	DF	USA	Maggie McBroom
4	DF	GRE	Fenia Makra
5	MF	NZL	Jana Radosavljević
7	DF	GRE	Angeliki Gkoufa
8	MF	MNE	Tatjana Đurković
10	MF	EGY	Sarah Essam
11	FW	ENG	Eve Blakey
14	MF	COL	Andrea Mendoza
17	DF	LAT	Anastasija Ročāne

No.	Pos.	Nation	Player
18	FW	GRE	Eva Kapareli
20	FW	GRE	Tonia Pournia
22	FW	GRE	Christina Laderou
30	MF	VEN	Daniela Torrealba
33	GK	GRE	Angeliki Theodoropoulou
44	MF	GRE	Ioanna Panagopoulou
77	DF	GRE	Emmanouela Keta
88	GK	GRE	Athanasia Badourou
91	DF	GRE	Aspasia Biriti (captain)
99	MF	GRE	Ifigeneia Georgantzi

=== Technical staff ===
Position	Name
Head coach	Elena Kouskouni

== Notable players ==
- (New Zealand) Jana Radosavljević
- (Montenegro) Tatjana Đurković
- (Latvia) Anastasija Ročāne

== See also ==
- PAS Pyrgos 1968
- Paniliakos F.C.
- Women's football in Greece
