= 2017 UEFA Women's Under-17 Championship =

Mistrovství Evropy ve fotbale žen do 17 let 2017

Tournament details
- Host country: Czech Republic
- Dates: 2–14 May
- Teams: 8 (from 1 confederation)
- Venue: 4 (in 4 host cities)

Final positions
- Champions: Germany (6th title)
- Runners-up: Spain

Tournament statistics
- Matches played: 15
- Goals scored: 44 (2.93 per match)
- Attendance: 30,757 (2,050 per match)
- Top scorer: (Germany) Melissa Kössler (3 goals)
- Best player: (Germany) Lena Oberdorf

The 2017 UEFA Women's Under-17 Championship (also known as UEFA Women's Under-17 Euro 2017) was the tenth edition of the UEFA Women's Under-17 Championship, the annual international youth football championship organised by UEFA for the women's under-17 national teams of Europe. The Czech Republic, which were selected by UEFA on 26 January 2015, hosted the tournament.

A total of eight teams played in the tournament, with players born on or after 1 January 2000 eligible to participate. Each match had a duration of 80 minutes, consisting of two halves of 40 minutes with a 15-minute half-time.

== Qualification ==
A total of 46 UEFA nations entered the competition (including Malta who entered for the first time), and with the hosts Czech Republic qualifying automatically, the other 45 teams competed in the qualifying competition to determine the remaining seven spots in the final tournament. The qualifying competition consisted of two rounds: Qualifying round, which took place in autumn 2016, and Elite round, which took place in spring 2017.

=== Qualified teams ===
The following eight teams qualified for the final tournament.

| Team | Method of qualification | Finals appearance | Last appearance | Previous best performance |
|---|---|---|---|---|
| Czech Republic | Hosts | 2nd | 2016 | Group stage (2016) |
| Netherlands | Elite round Group 1 winners | 2nd | 2010 | Fourth place (2010) |
| Norway | Elite round Group 2 winners | 4th | 2016 | Fourth place (2009, 2016) |
| England | Elite round Group 3 winners | 5th | 2016 | Third place (2016) |
| Germany | Elite round Group 3 runners-up | 9th | 2016 | Champions (2008, 2009, 2012, 2014, 2016) |
| Republic of Ireland | Elite round Group 4 winners | 3rd | 2015 | Runners-up (2010) |
| France | Elite round Group 5 winners | 7th | 2015 | Runners-up (2008, 2011, 2012) |
| Spain | Elite round Group 6 winners | 8th | 2016 | Champions (2010, 2011, 2015) |

Notes

1. The best runners-up among all six elite round groups qualified for the final tournament.

=== Final draw ===
The final draw was held on 7 April 2017, 10:00 CEST (UTC+2), at the Park Hotel in Plzeň, Czech Republic. The eight teams were drawn into two groups of four teams. There was no seeding, except that hosts Czech Republic were assigned to position A1 in the draw.

== Venues ==
The tournament was hosted in four venues:

- Doosan Arena, Plzeň
- Na Litavce, Příbram
- Stadion TJ Přeštice, Přeštice
- Stadion Střelnice Domažlice, Domažlice

== Match officials ==
A total of 6 referees, 8 assistant referees and 2 fourth officials were appointed for the final tournament.

Referees

- (Austria) Julia-Stefanie Baier
- (Bulgaria) Galiya Echeva
- (Finland) Ifeoma Kulmala
- (Italy) Maria Marotta
- (Romania) Cristina Mariana Trandafir
- (Turkey) Melis Özçiğdem

Assistant referees

- (Kazakhstan) Anastassiya Akimova
- (Lithuania) Ieva Ramanauskienė
- (Moldova) Natalia Ceban
- (Poland) Aleksandra Prus
- (Portugal) Vanessa Alexandra Dias Gomes
- (Romania) Alexandra Theodora Apostu
- (Switzerland) Sabrina Keinersdorfer
- (Slovenia) Petra Bombek

Fourth officials

- (Belgium) Hannelore Onsea
- (Czech Republic) Lucie Šulcová

== Squads ==
Each national team have to submit a squad of 18 players.

== Group stage ==
The final tournament schedule was confirmed on 11 April 2017.

The group winners and runners-up advance to the semi-finals.

Tiebreakers

The teams are ranked according to points (3 points for a win, 1 point for a draw, 0 points for a loss). If two or more teams are equal on points on completion of the group matches, the following tie-breaking criteria are applied, in the order given, to determine the rankings (Regulations Articles 17.01 and 17.02):

1. Higher number of points obtained in the group matches played among the teams in question;
2. Superior goal difference resulting from the group matches played among the teams in question;
3. Higher number of goals scored in the group matches played among the teams in question;
4. If, after having applied criteria 1 to 3, teams still have an equal ranking, criteria 1 to 3 are reapplied exclusively to the group matches between the teams in question to determine their final rankings. If this procedure does not lead to a decision, criteria 5 to 9 apply;
5. Superior goal difference in all group matches;
6. Higher number of goals scored in all group matches;
7. If only two teams have the same number of points, and they are tied according to criteria 1 to 6 after having met in the last round of the group stage, their rankings are determined by a penalty shoot-out (not used if more than two teams have the same number of points, or if their rankings are not relevant for qualification for the next stage).
8. Lower disciplinary points total based only on yellow and red cards received in the group matches (red card = 3 points, yellow card = 1 point, expulsion for two yellow cards in one match = 3 points);
9. Higher position in the coefficient ranking list used for the qualifying round draw;
10. Drawing of lots.

All times are local, CEST (UTC+2).

=== Group A ===
| Pos | Team | Pld | W | D | L | GF | GA | GD | Pts | Qualification |
|---|---|---|---|---|---|---|---|---|---|---|
| 1 | Germany | 3 | 3 | 0 | 0 | 11 | 3 | +8 | 9 | Knockout stage |
| 2 | Spain | 3 | 1 | 1 | 1 | 7 | 6 | +1 | 4 | Knockout stage |
| 3 | France | 3 | 1 | 1 | 1 | 4 | 4 | 0 | 4 | |
| 4 | Czech Republic (H) | 3 | 0 | 0 | 3 | 3 | 12 | −9 | 0 | |

Source: UEFA
Rules for classification: Group stage tiebreakers
(H) Hosts
2 May 2017
11:00

| Czech Republic | 1–2 | France |
|---|---|---|
| Šlajsová 53' | Report | Malard 25', 50' |

Doosan Arena, Plzeň
Attendance: 10,219
Referee: Ifeoma Kulmala (Finland)
2 May 2017
16:00

| Spain | 1–4 | Germany |
|---|---|---|
| E. Navarro 62' | Report | Oberdorf 27'; Kössler 48'; Rackow 78'; Nüsken 79' |

Stadion TJ Přeštice, Přeštice
Attendance: 1,039
Referee: Cristina Trandafir (Romania)

5 May 2017
11:00

| Czech Republic | 1–5 | Spain |
|---|---|---|
| Siváková 79' (pen.) | Report | Pina 8'; Andújar 41'; L. Navarro 46'; Pujadas 64'; Márquez 69' |

Stadion Střelnice Domažlice, Domažlice
Attendance: 2,465
Referee: Galiya Echeva (Bulgaria)
5 May 2017
11:00

| Germany | 2–1 | France |
|---|---|---|
| Kössler 20', 43' | Report | Lakrar 77' |

Na Litavce, Příbram
Attendance: 1,270
Referee: Julia-Stefanie Baier (Austria)

8 May 2017
14:00

| Germany | 5–1 | Czech Republic |
|---|---|---|
| Anyomi 41', 53'; Wieder 59'; Schneider 74'; Rackow 80+4' | Report | Khýrová 39' (pen.) |

Na Litavce, Příbram
Attendance: 1,229
Referee: Maria Marotta (Italy)
8 May 2017
14:00

| France | 1–1 | Spain |
|---|---|---|
| Martin 5' | Report | Andújar 62' |

Stadion TJ Přeštice, Přeštice
Attendance: 1,039
Referee: Ifeoma Kulmala (Finland)

=== Group B ===
| Pos | Team | Pld | W | D | L | GF | GA | GD | Pts | Qualification |
|---|---|---|---|---|---|---|---|---|---|---|
| 1 | Netherlands | 3 | 2 | 1 | 0 | 5 | 2 | +3 | 7 | Knockout stage |
| 2 | Norway | 3 | 2 | 0 | 1 | 4 | 3 | +1 | 6 | Knockout stage |
| 3 | England | 3 | 1 | 0 | 2 | 6 | 4 | +2 | 3 | |
| 4 | Republic of Ireland | 3 | 0 | 1 | 2 | 0 | 6 | −6 | 1 | |

Source: UEFA
Rules for classification: Group stage tiebreakers
2 May 2017
11:00

| Republic of Ireland | 0–5 | England |
|---|---|---|
| | Report | Pattinson 9'; O'Donnell 36'; Ngunga 38'; Hemp 41'; Douglas 64' |

Na Litavce, Příbram
Attendance: 2,200
Referee: Galiya Echeva (Bulgaria)
2 May 2017
11:00

| Norway | 1–3 | Netherlands |
|---|---|---|
| Tvedten 23' | Report | Wilms 12'; Casparij 20'; Ter Beek 37' |

Stadion Střelnice Domažlice, Domažlice
Attendance: 1,426
Referee: Julia-Stefanie Baier (Austria)

5 May 2017
11:00

| Republic of Ireland | 0–1 | Norway |
|---|---|---|
| | Report | Nygård 77' |

Doosan Arena, Plzeň
Attendance: 4,273
Referee: Melis Özçiğdem (Turkey)
5 May 2017
16:00

| Netherlands | 2–1 | England |
|---|---|---|
| Baijings 40'; Leuchter 77' | Report | Palmer 38' |

Stadion TJ Přeštice, Přeštice
Attendance: 1,039
Referee: Maria Marotta (Italy)

8 May 2017
14:00

| Netherlands | 0–0 | Republic of Ireland |
|---|---|---|
| | Report |

Stadion Střelnice Domažlice, Domažlice
Attendance: 827
Referee: Cristina Trandafir (Romania)
8 May 2017
18:00

| England | 0–2 | Norway |
|---|---|---|
| | Report | Olsen 8'; Sunde 33' |

Doosan Arena, Plzeň
Attendance: 489
Referee: Melis Özçiğdem (Turkey)

== Knockout stage ==
In the knockout stage, penalty shoot-out is used to decide the winner if necessary (no extra time is played).

As part of a trial sanctioned by the IFAB to reduce the advantage of the team shooting first in a penalty shoot-out, a different sequence of taking penalties, known as "ABBA", that mirrors the serving sequence in a tennis tiebreak would be used if a penalty shoot-out was needed (team A kicks first, team B kicks second):

Original sequence
AB AB AB AB AB (sudden death starts) AB AB etc.
Trial sequence
AB BA AB BA AB (sudden death starts) BA AB etc.

The penalty shoot-out in the semi-final between Germany and Norway was the first ever to implement this new system.

There is no third place match for this edition of the tournament as it is not used as a qualifier for the FIFA U-17 Women's World Cup (since expansion to eight teams).

=== Bracket ===
Semi-finals
11 May – Příbram
Germany (p) | 1 (3)
Norway | 1 (2)
11 May – Domažlice
Netherlands | 0
Spain | 2

Final
14 May – Plzeň
Germany (p) | 0 (3)
Spain | 0 (1)

=== Semi-finals ===
11 May 2017
11:00

| Netherlands | 0–2 | Spain |
|---|---|---|
| | Report | Bautista 5' (pen.); Pina 34' |

Stadion Střelnice Domažlice, Domažlice
Attendance: 825
Referee: Maria Marotta (Italy)

11 May 2017
18:00

| Germany | 1–1 | Norway |
|---|---|---|
| Lohmann 44' | Report | Tvedten 7' |
Penalties
| Wieder (penalty missed); Rackow (penalty missed); Lohmann (penalty missed); Kössler (penalty scored); Nüsken (penalty scored); Brunner (penalty scored) | 3–2 | (penalty missed) Bjelde; (penalty scored) Sunde; (penalty scored) Tvedten; (penalty missed) Birkeli; (penalty missed) Bjørneboe; (penalty missed) Haugland |

Na Litavce, Příbram
Attendance: 260
Referee: Ifeoma Kulmala (Finland)

=== Final ===
14 May 2017
18:30

| Germany | 0–0 | Spain |
|---|---|---|
| | Report |
Penalties
| Oberdorf (penalty scored); Bahnemann (penalty missed); Wieder (penalty scored); Kössler (penalty scored) | 3–1 | (penalty missed) Bautista; (penalty missed) Aleixandri; (penalty missed) Torrodà; (penalty scored) Pina |

Doosan Arena, Plzeň
Attendance: 2,157
Referee: Julia-Stefanie Baier (Austria)

== Goalscorers ==
3 goals

- (Germany) Melissa Kössler

2 goals

- (France) Melvine Malard
- (Germany) Nicole Anyomi
- (Germany) Gianna Rackow
- (Norway) Olaug Tvedten
- (Spain) Candela Andújar
- (Spain) Clàudia Pina

1 goal

- (Czech Republic) Michaela Khýrová
- (Czech Republic) Kristýna Siváková
- (Czech Republic) Gabriela Šlajsová
- (England) Nicole Douglas
- (England) Lauren Hemp
- (England) Jessica Ngunga
- (England) Bethany May O'Donnell
- (England) Aimee Palmer
- (England) Poppy Pattinson
- (France) Maëlle Lakrar
- (France) Laurène Martin
- (Germany) Sydney Lohmann
- (Germany) Sjoeke Nüsken
- (Germany) Lena Oberdorf
- (Germany) Lea Schneider
- (Germany) Verena Wieder
- (Netherlands) Jill Baijings
- (Netherlands) Kerstin Casparij
- (Netherlands) Romée Leuchter
- (Netherlands) Williënne ter Beek
- (Netherlands) Lynn Wilms
- (Norway) Rikke Bogetveit Nygård
- (Norway) Jenny Kristine Røsholm Olsen
- (Norway) Malin Sunde
- (Spain) Carla Bautista
- (Spain) Rosa Márquez
- (Spain) Eva Navarro
- (Spain) Lorena Navarro
- (Spain) Berta Pujadas

Source: UEFA.com

== Team of the Tournament ==
Goalkeepers

- (France) Justine Lerond
- (Germany) Stina Johannes

Defenders

- (France) Maëlle Lakrar
- (Germany) Andrea Brunner
- (Netherlands) Lisa Doorn
- (Norway) Malin Sunde
- (Spain) Laia Aleixandri
- (Spain) Rosa Otermin Abella

Midfielders

- (England) Lauren Hemp
- (France) Selma Bacha
- (Germany) Sydney Lohmann
- (Germany) Sjoeke Nüsken
- (Germany) Lena Oberdorf
- (Netherlands) Jill Baijings
- (Norway) Olaug Tvedten

Forwards

- (Germany) Melissa Kössler
- (Spain) Candela Andújar
- (Spain) Clàudia Pina

Source: UEFA Technical Report
