= Jana Radosavljević =

Serbian–New Zealand footballer

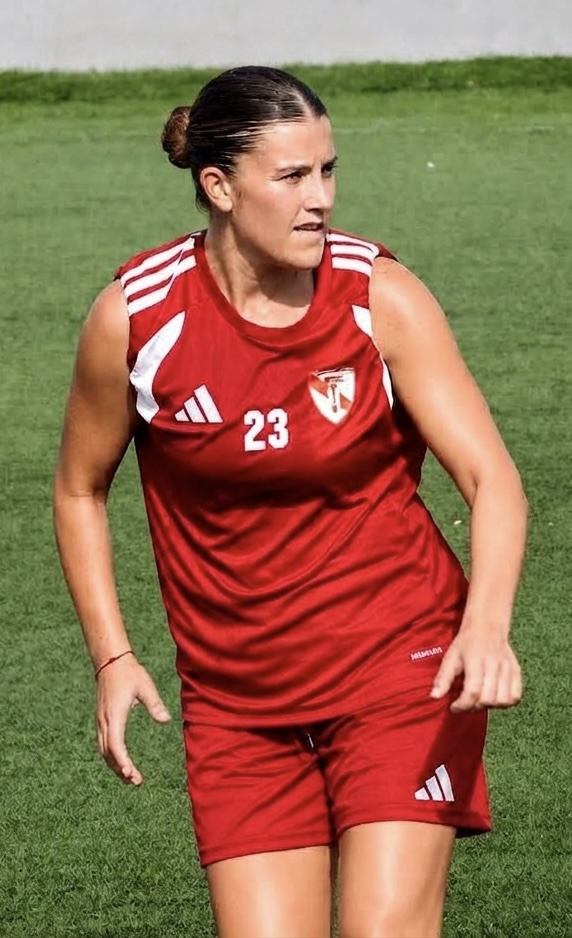
- Radosavljević in 2026

Personal information
- Date of birth: 4 November 1996 (age 30)
- Place of birth: Aleksinac, FR Yugoslavia (now Serbia)
- Height: 1.73 m (5 ft 8 in)
- Position: Midfielder

Team information
- Current team: Pyrgos AFC

Youth career
- Petone Pioneers
- Red Star Belgrade

Senior career*
Years	Team	Apps	(Gls)
2017–2020	BV Cloppenburg	40	(14)
2020–2021	Werder Bremen	15	(1)
2021–2023	Arminia Bielefeld	22	(7)
2023	Fenerbahçe	8	(0)
2024	MSV Duisburg	8	(1)
2024–2026	C.S Marítimo	29	(3)
2026–	Pyrgos AFC	6	(1)

International career^{‡}
2013	Serbia U19	3	(0)
2019–	New Zealand	3	(0)
- * Club domestic league appearances and goals as of 28 January 2026 ‡ National team caps and goals as of 14 January 2025

Jana Radosavljević (Serbian: Јана Радосављевић; born 4 November 1996) is a footballer who plays as a midfielder for Pyrgos AFC in the Greek A Division. Born in Serbia, she represents the New Zealand women's national team.

== Club career ==
Radosavljević started her entire professional career in Germany, having signed for BV Cloppenburg ahead of the 2017–18 season, scoring on her debut. She played 3 seasons for BC Cloppenburg scoring 14 goals. Ahead of the 2020–21 season, Radosavljević moved to Werder Bremen team to play in the Frauen-Bundesliga. Radosavljević signed with Arminia Bielefeld, ahead of the 2021–22 season.

Radosavljevic signed with Fenerbahçe in the Turkish Women's Football Super League for the 2023–24 season. Radosavljević made a mid season transfer in December 2023 to return to the Frauen-Bundesliga, signing with MSV Duisburg. Ahead of the 2024-25 season, Radosavljevic transferred to C.S. Marítimo in Portugal in the Campeonato Nacional de Futebol Feminino. In August 2026, Radosavljević was the star signing for Pyrgos AFC in the Greek A Division.

== International career ==
Radosavljević vs Canada in 2019.

Radosavljević was first called up in November 2017 for matches against Thailand but made her international debut for the New Zealand national team on 7 November 2019, appearing in the 2–0 loss against China in the 2019 Yongchuan International Tournament. She made her second appearance three days later against Canada. Her third appearance she made at 7 March 2020 at the 2020 Algarve Cup in the 3–0 loss against Italy. She also received call ups against South Korea in November 2021, and the United States in January 2023 without making an appearance. She was in the squad to play Chinese Taipei in April 2025 but both matches were called off due to pitch condition.

== Personal life ==
Radosavljević was born in Aleksinac the Republic of Serbia, FR Yugoslavia to Serbian parents Aleksandra and Ivica Radosavljević, but moved to New Zealand, where her aunt lived, after the Yugoslav Wars. She has one brother named Ilija. She attended Waterloo School in Waterloo, Lower Hutt for five years before returning to Serbia with her parents in February 2006. Radosavljević is fluent in the Serbian, English and German languages.

== Career statistics ==
=== Club ===
Appearances and goals by club, season and competition
Club	Season	League			National cup		Total	
Club	Season	Division	Apps	Goals	Apps	Goals	Apps	Goals
BV Cloppenburg	2017–18	2. Frauen-Bundesliga	22	10	2	1	24	11
BV Cloppenburg	2018–19	2. Frauen-Bundesliga	2	1	2	0	4	1
BV Cloppenburg	2019–20	2. Frauen-Bundesliga	16	3	1	0	17	3
BV Cloppenburg	Total		40	14	5	1	45	15
Werder Bremen	2020–21	Frauen-Bundesliga	15	1	4	1	19	2
Arminia Bielefeld	2021–22	2. Frauen-Bundesliga	4	2	0	0	4	2
Arminia Bielefeld	2022–23	2. Frauen-Bundesliga	18	5	0	0	18	5
Arminia Bielefeld	Total		22	7	0	0	22	7
Fenerbahçe	2023–24	Turkish Super League	8	0	1	0	9	0
MSV Duisburg	2023–24	Frauen-Bundesliga	8	1	1	0	9	1
Marítimo	2024–25	Campeonato Nacional	18	3	4	0	22	3
Marítimo	2025–26	Campeonato Nacional	11	0	2	0	13	0
Marítimo	Total		29	3	6	0	35	3
Pyrgos AFC	2026-27	Greek A Division	6	1	0	0	6	1
Career total			128	27	17	2	145	29

=== International ===
As of 19 April 2024

Appearances and goals by national team and year
National team	Year	Apps	Goals
New Zealand	2019	2	0
New Zealand	2020	1	0
Total		3	0
