= Melis Özçiğdem =

Turkish football referee (born 1982)

- Born: October 26, 1982 (age 43); İzmir, Turkey
- Other occupation: Teacher

Domestic
Years	League	Role
2010–2014	A2	referee
2010–2014	Regional Amateur	referee
2014–	TFF Third	referee
2014–	TFF Second	fourth official
2010	Women's Regional	referee
2008–2009	Women's Second	referee
2009–	Women's First	referee

International
Years	League	Role
2013–	UEFA Women's Under-17 Championship	referee
2014–	UEFA Women's Under-19 Championship	referee

Melis Özçiğdem (born October 26, 1982), aka Meliz Özçiğdem, is a Turkish FIFA listed football referee and former international women's footballer. She is a teacher of physical education at a secondary school in Konak, İzmir.

== Sports career ==
=== Player ===
==== Club ====
Melis Özçiğdem began her sports career after obtaining her license for İzmir Öztürkspor in her hometown on November 8, 1999. She joined Ankara University's football team on March 2, 2001, when she enrolled at the university in Ankara. On December 24 that year, she moved to Gazi Üniversitesispor, where she played until the end of the 2001–02 season in the First League capping 8 times and scoring 10 goals. As the women's football league in Turkey was suspended between 2003 and 2006, she took a break. Finally, she transferred to Bucaspor for the 2006–07 season.

==== International ====
Özçiğdem was admitted to the Turkey U-19 team and debuted in the 2000 UEFA Women's Under-18 Championship Second qualifying round match against Ireland on October 19, 1999. She took part at the 2001 UEFA Women's Under-18 Championship First qualifying and Second qualifying round matches. She appeared in 11 matches of the Turkey women's U-19 team.

On May 20, 2001, she played for the first time in the Turkey women's team at the friendly match against Greece. Özçiğdem was part of the national team at the 2003 FIFA World Cup qualification (UEFA) – Group 8 and UEFA Euro 2009 qualifying – Group A1 matches. She capped 8 times in total for the Turkey women's nationals.

She was part of the Turkey yeam at the 2005 Summer Universiade held in İzmir.

=== Referee ===
==== Domestic ====
Özçiğdem began her referee career as an assistant referee in a match of the Turkish youth league, (Turkish: Deplasmanlı Süper Gençler Ligi, DSGL, on October 20, 2007. She was tasked in this capacity at the Women's First League on November 30, 2008.

She made her debut as a referee in the Women's Second League on December 28, 2008. She served in various competitions of the Turkish men's reserve team league, called A2 Ligi from November 15, 2010, on. She was promoted to officiate in the Women's First League on December 5, 2010. She appeared for the first time as referee in the TFF Third League on September 20, 2014, and as fourth official in the TFF Second League on December 14 the same year.

==== International ====
2013

Özçiğdem officiated two of the 2014 UEFA Women's Under-17 Championship qualification – Group 4 matches in October 2013.

2014

She officiated two of the 2014 UEFA Women's Under-19 Championship qualification – Group 6 matches in April 2014, two games of the 2014–15 UEFA Women's Champions League qualifying round – Group 6 on August 9–11, 2014 and two of the 2015 UEFA Women's Under-17 Championship qualification – Group 1 matches in October 2014.

2015

She served as referee in two matches of the 2016 UEFA Women's Under-19 Championship qualification – Group 10 in September 2015.

2016

In 2016, Özçiğdem officiated the match Belgium against Estonia at the UEFA Women's Euro 2017 qualifying Group 7 in Leuven, Belgium on 12 April. She was assigned to officiate the 2017 UEFA Women's Under-19 Championship qualification matches Norway against Armenia in Plewiska, Poland on 15 September, and between Armenia, Poland in Wronki, Poland on 20 September. She served as referee at the 2017 UEFA Women's Under-17 Championship qualification Group 10 matches between Ireland and Belarus in Cork, Ireland on 28 October and Iceland against Ireland in Cork, Ireland on 31 October.

2017

Özçiğdem officiated the 2017 UEFA Women's Under-17 Championship qualification matchesSlovenia against Netherlands in Zaltbommel, Netherlands on 27 March and between Netherlands and Switzerland in Zaltbommel, Netherlands on 29 March 2017. She served as referee at the 2017 UEFA Women's Under-17 Championship Group B matches between Ireland and Norway on 5 May, and between England and Norway in Plzeň, Czech Republic on 8 May 2017.

2018

She officiated the 2018 UEFA Women's Under-19 Championship Group B match Germany against Denmark in Biel/Bienne, Switzerland on 18 July 2018. At the 2017–18 UEFA Women's Champions League qualifying round, she was the referee in the matches Stjarnan against ŽFK Istatov in Osijek, Croatia on 25 August, and between ŽFK Istatov and Klaksvíkar Ítróttarfelag in Vinkovci, Croatia on 28 August 2018. In 2018, she served as referee further in the Round of 32 match at the 2018–19 UEFA Women's Champions League knockout phase between AFC Ajax Vrouwen and AC Sparta Praha in Duivendrecht, Netherlands on 12 September.

2019

She officiated the Round of 32 match at the 2019–20 UEFA Women's Champions League between VfL Wolfsburg and KFF Mitrovica in Wolfsburg, Germany on 25 September 2019, and the UEFA Women's Euro 2021 qualifying competition Group F match between Hungary and Sweden in Miskolc, Hungary on 4 October, as well as the Group C match between Norway and Northern Ireland in Stavanger, Norway on 8 November 2019, Özçelik was the referee of the friendly match between Turkey and Ukraine in Menemen, Turkey on 11 November 2019.

== See also ==
- Turkish women in sports
