= Aalst, Zaltbommel =

Aalst
- Village
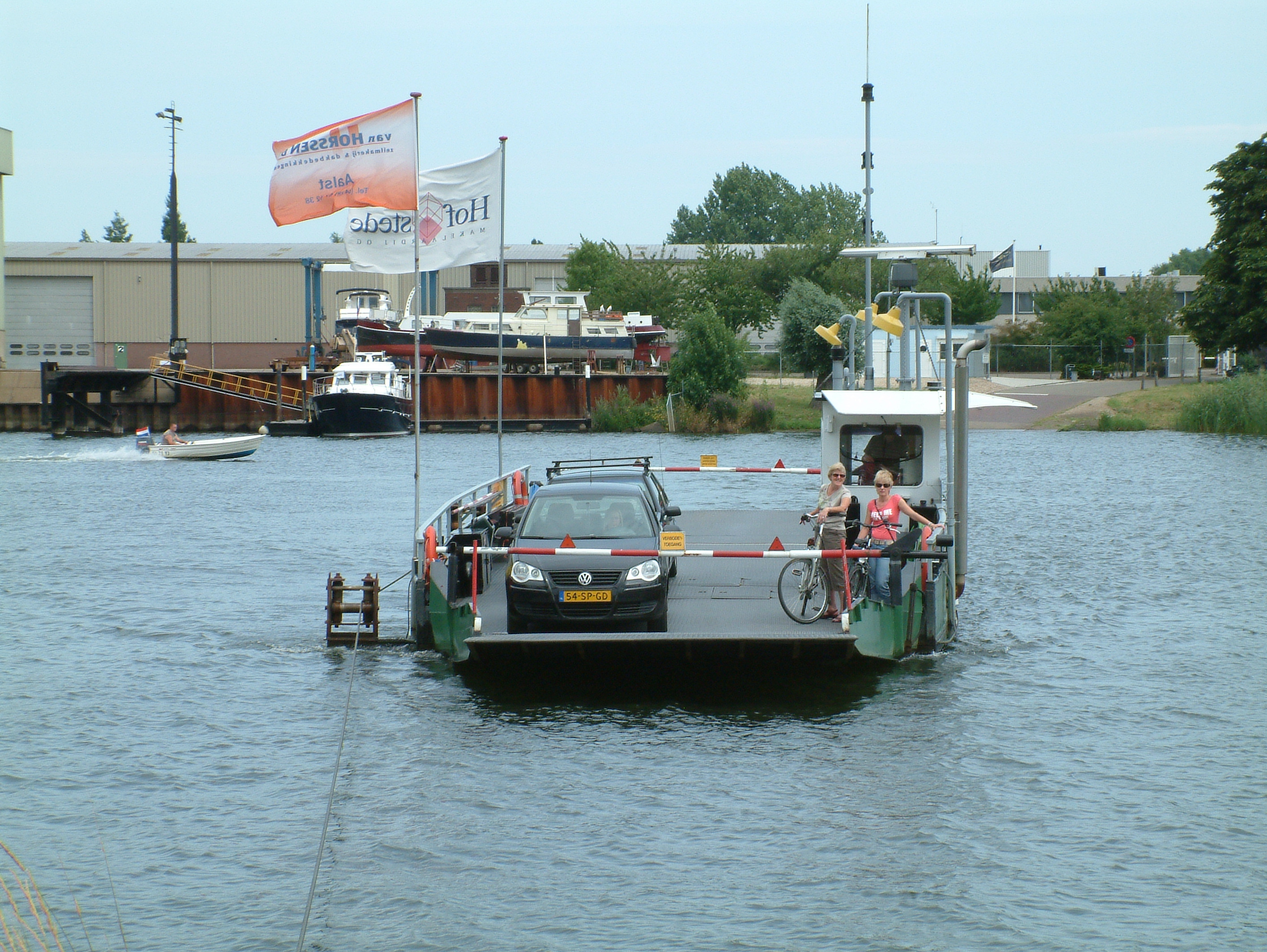
- Ferry Aalst–Veen

- Coat of arms

- Location in the Netherlands Aalst (Netherlands) Aalst (Europe)
- Coordinates: 51°47′N 5°7′E
- Country: Netherlands
- Province: Gelderland
- Municipality: Zaltbommel

Area
  - Total: 11.03 km^{2} (4.26 sq mi)
- Elevation: 4 m (13 ft)

Population (2021)
  - Total: 2,290
  - Density: 208/km^{2} (538/sq mi)
- Time zone: UTC+1 (CET)
  - Summer (DST): UTC+2 (CEST)
- Postal code: 5308
- Dialing code: 0418

Aalst [aːɫst] is a village in the Dutch province of Gelderland. It is a part of the municipality of Zaltbommel, and lies about 12 km southeast of Gorinchem.

For a short while, Aalst was a separate municipality. In 1818, it became a part of the municipality of Poederoijen. According to the historian Van der Aa, there used to be an old castle here, but only a few remnants were left in the middle of the 19th century.

It was first mentioned in 850 as "Halosta". Baldericus donated some pieces of land to the Benedictine monastery called Laurisheim. The etymology is unclear. Aalst developed into a stretched out esdorp. Part of the Protestant church dates from the 12th century. In 1840, it was home to 481 people.

== Gallery ==
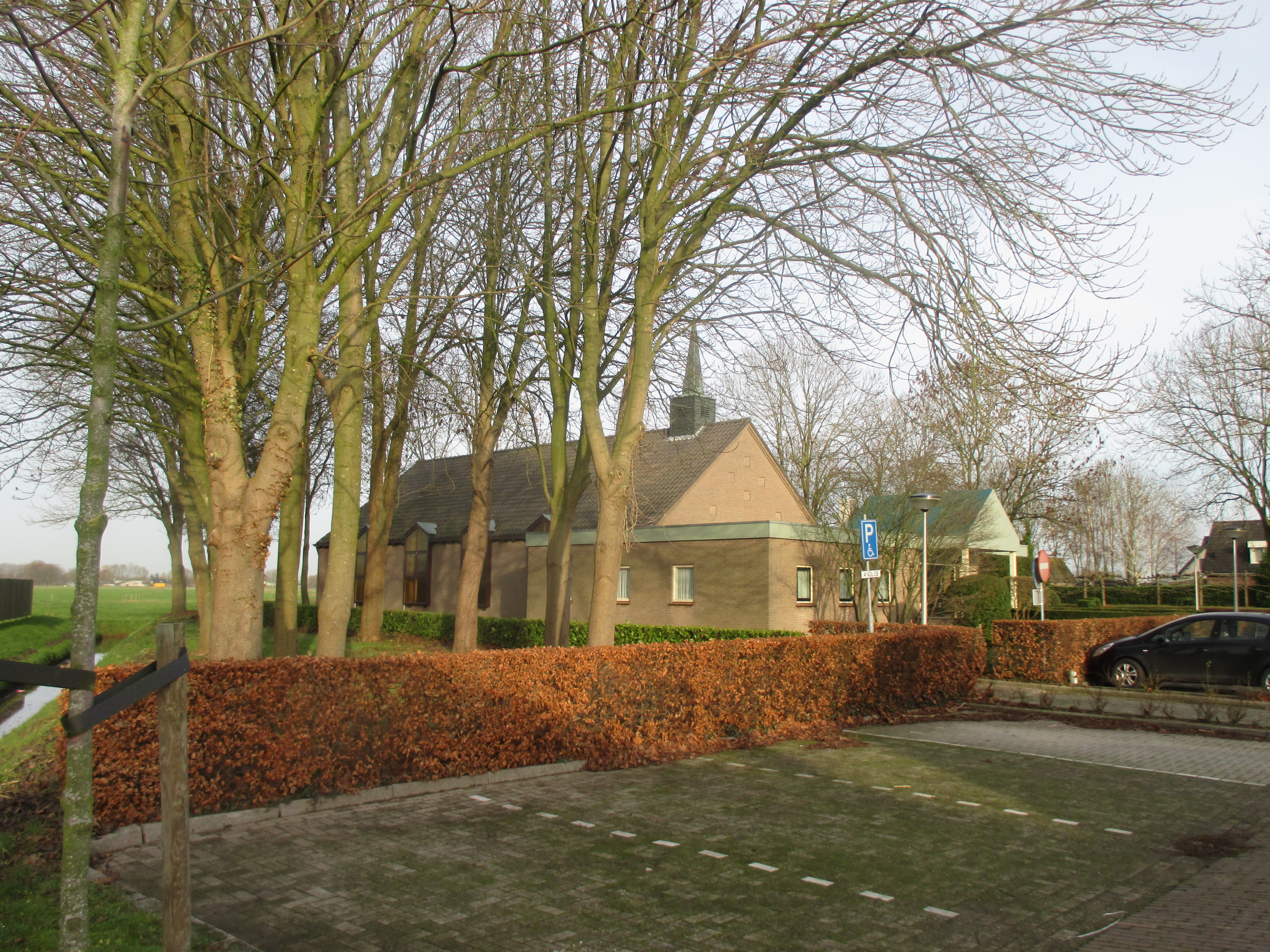
Church in Aalst

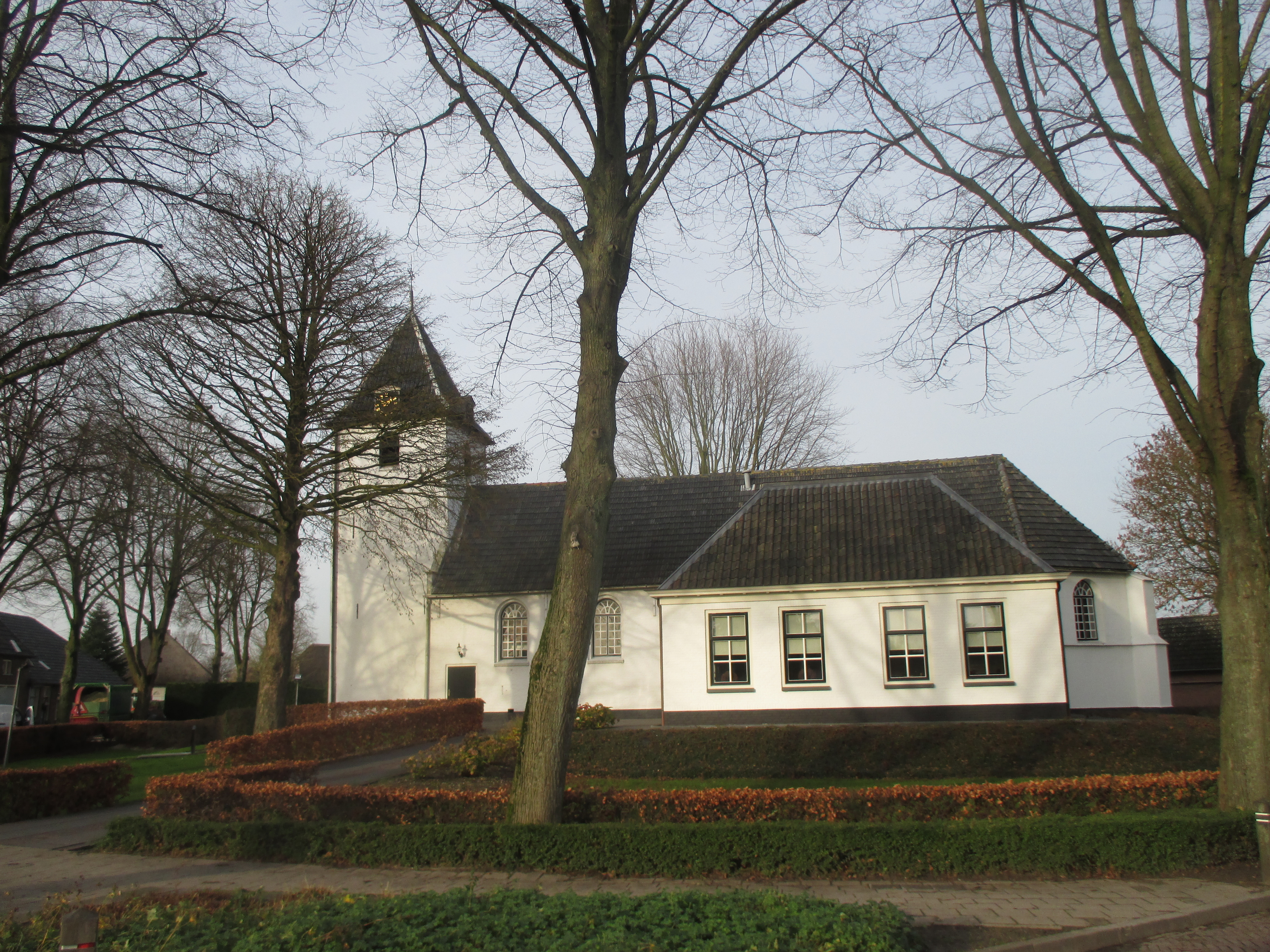
Catholic church

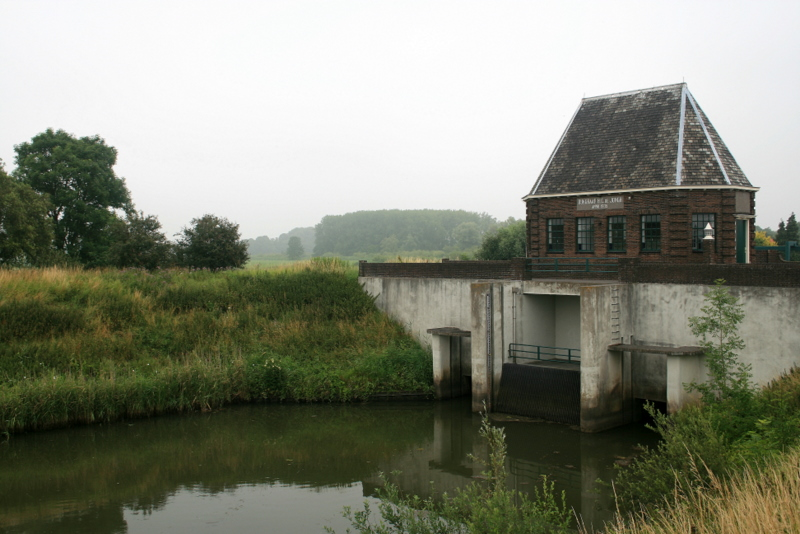
Pumping station H.C. De Jongh
