= Veen, Netherlands =

Veen
- Village
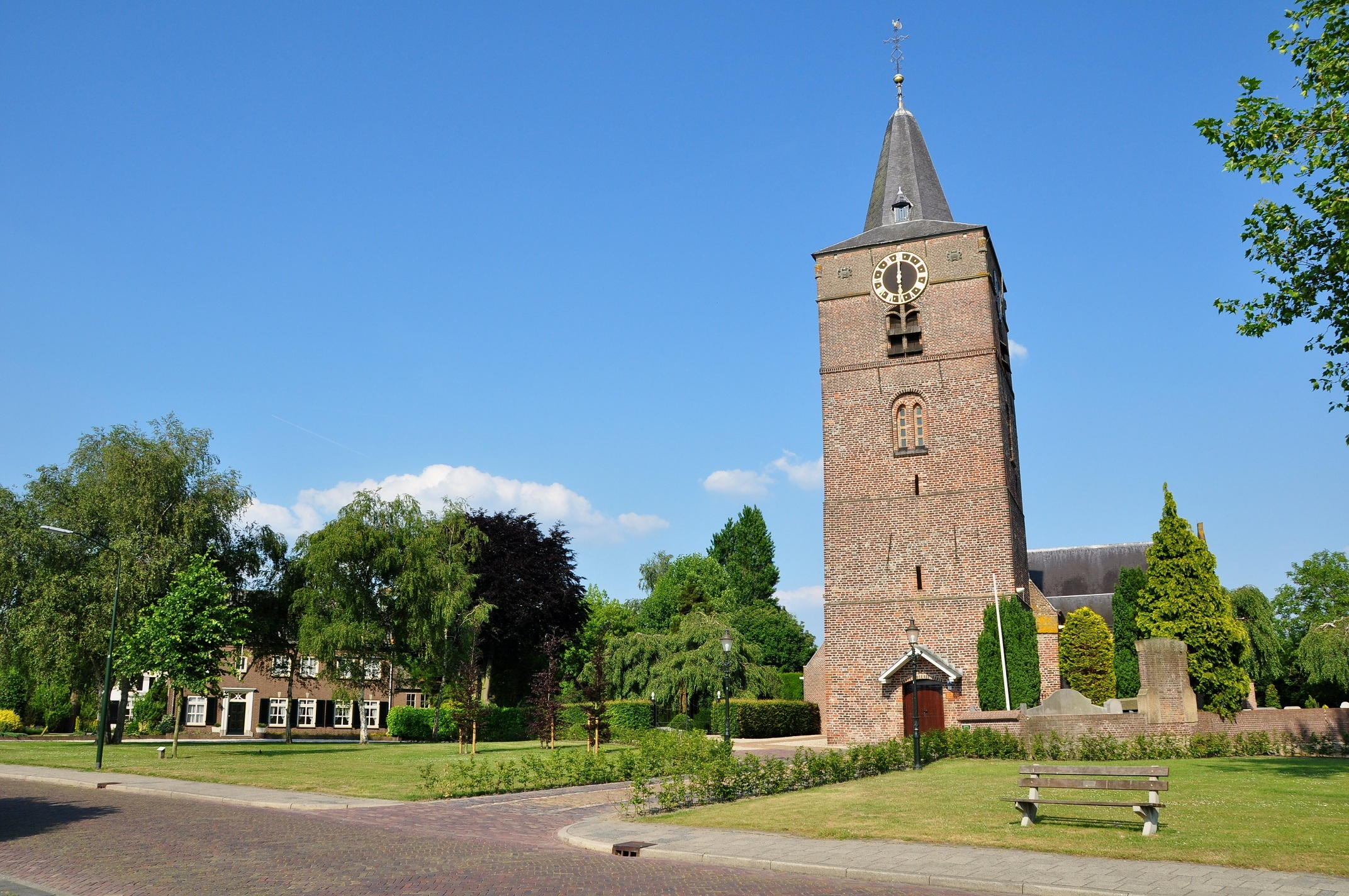
- Centre of Veen with the Netherlands Reformed Church.

- Coat of arms

- Location in the province of North Brabant in the Netherlands Veen (Netherlands)
- Coordinates: 51°46′37″N 5°6′35″E
- Country: Netherlands
- Province: North Brabant
- Municipality: Altena

Area
  - Total: 3.48 km^{2} (1.34 sq mi)
- Elevation: 1.5 m (4.9 ft)

Population (2021)
  - Total: 2,980
  - Density: 856/km^{2} (2,220/sq mi)
- Time zone: UTC+1 (CET)
  - Summer (DST): UTC+2 (CEST)
- Postal code: 4264
- Dialing code: 0416

Veen is a village in the Dutch province of North Brabant. It is located in the municipality of Altena, about 20 km northwest of 's-Hertogenbosch. It is infamous for its New Year's Eve tradition during which scrap cars are burnt, and in 2020 even firemen were attacked with fireworks.

== History ==
It was first mentioned between 1108 and 1121 as de Ueno and means raised bog. Veen is a river bank settlement along the Afgedamde Maas which developed in the Middle Ages.

Its Dutch Reformed church dates from around 1200. The tower was added in the late 13th century. The church was destroyed in 1504 during the Guelders Wars, and later rebuilt. The church was enlarged in 1648. During the restoration of 1961 to 1963, it was returned to its medieval shape.

The grist mill De Hoop was built in 1838. In 1956, it was sold to the municipality who later transferred it to a foundation who restored the mill in 1970. In 1987, it was restored and elevated, because it was hit by trucks several times due to its proximity to the road. Since 2012, the mill is grinding professionally again.

Veen was home to 871 people in 1840. In 1880, the dike breached and most of the village was destroyed. It was later rebuilt.

Veen was a separate municipality until 1973, when it became part of Aalburg.

== Gallery ==
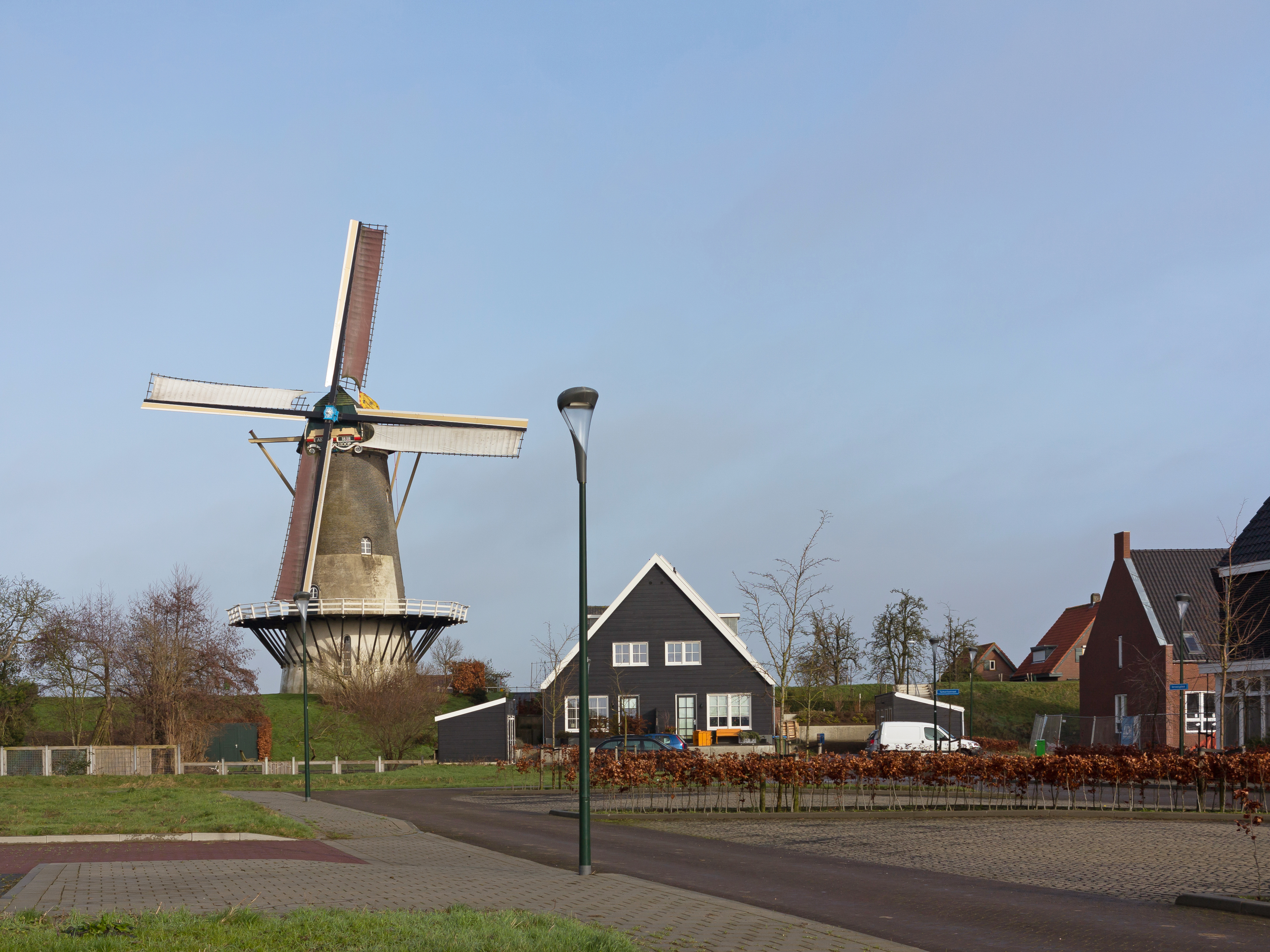
Windmill de Hoop in Veen

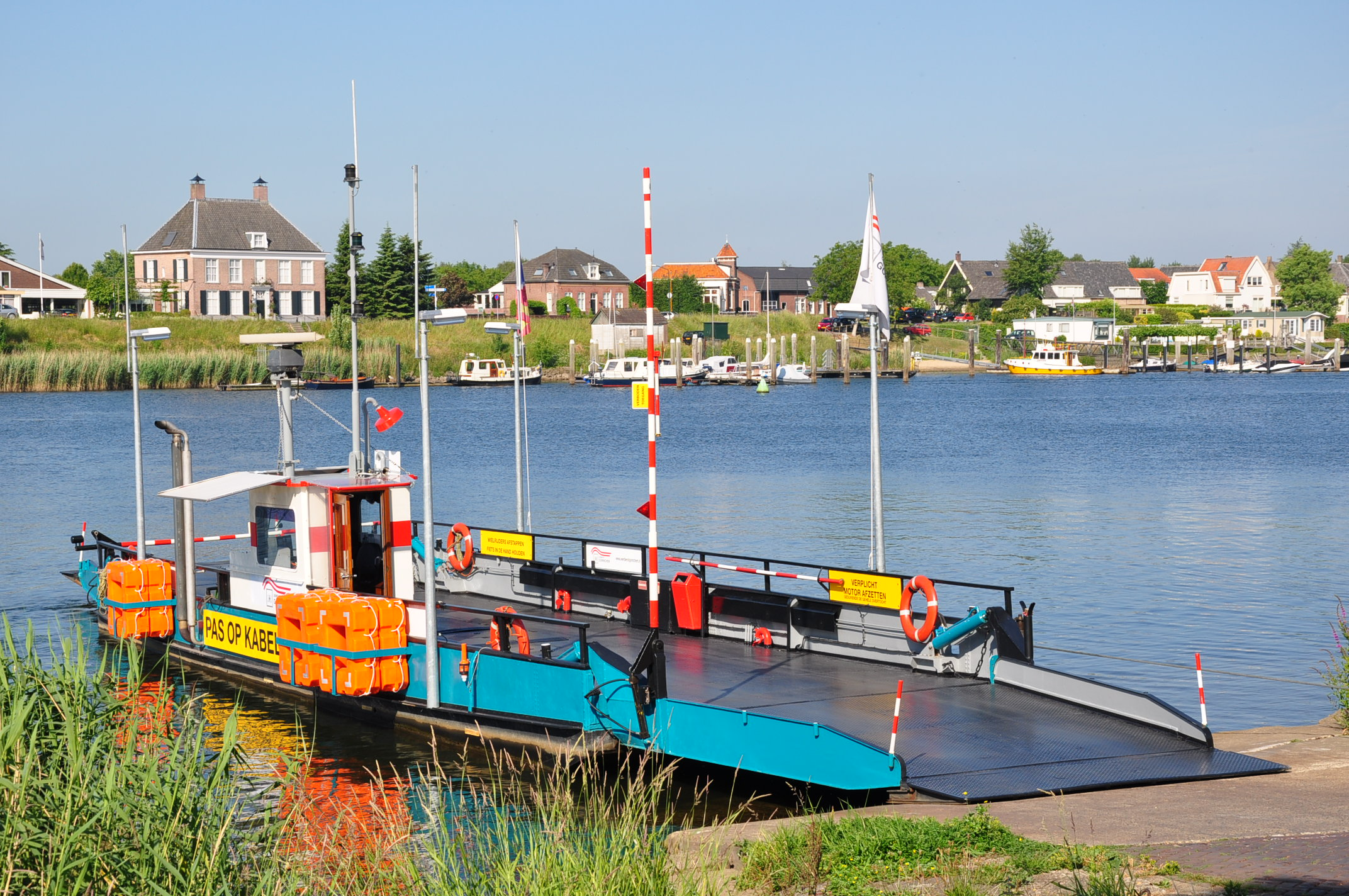
Veen, seen from Aalst
