= Verena Wieder =

German footballer

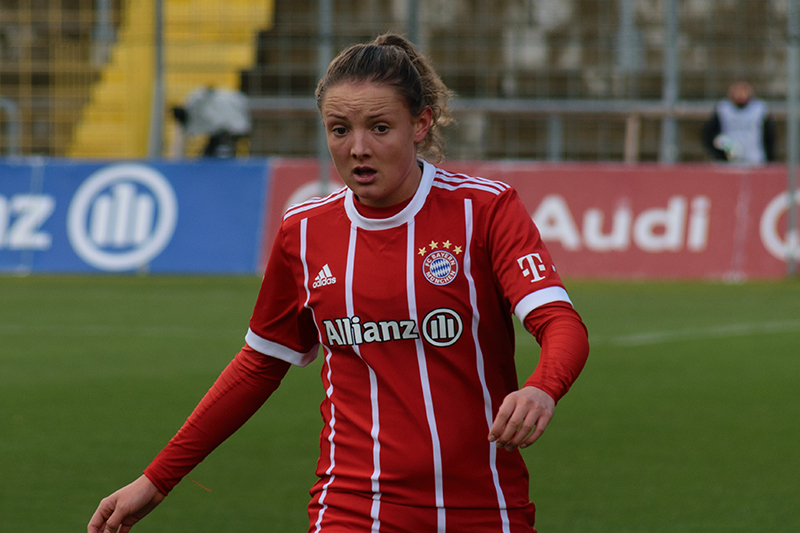
- Wieder with Bayern Munich

Personal information
- Full name: Verena Lisa Wieder
- Date of birth: 26 June 2000 (age 26)
- Place of birth: Thalhofen an der Wertach, Germany
- Height: 1.73 m (5 ft 8 in)
- Positions: Midfielder; forward

Team information
- Current team: VfB Stuttgart
- Number: 31

Youth career
- 2014–2015: FC Kempten
- 2015–2016: FC Memmingen
- 2016–2017: Bayern Munich U17

Senior career*
Years	Team	Apps	(Gls)
2016–2018	Bayern Munich II	8	(1)
2016–2018	Bayern Munich	8	(0)
2018–2020	SC Freiburg	19	(4)
2020–2024	Bayer Leverkusen	42	(14)
2024–2026	Werder Bremen	28	(1)
2026–	VfB Stuttgart	9	(2)

International career^{‡}
2014–2015	Germany U15	6	(0)
2015–2016	Germany U16	3	(0)
2016–2017	Germany U17	16	(2)
2017–2018	Germany U19	8	(2)
- * Club domestic league appearances and goals as of 22 November 2026 ‡ National team caps and goals as of 31 December 2017

Verena Lisa Wieder (born 26 June 2000) is a German footballer who plays as a midfielder for Frauen-Bundesliga club VfB Stuttgart. She was youth international for Germany on several selection levels.

== Career ==
Throughout her career, Wieder repeatedly suffered with anterior cruciate ligament injuries. In 2020, while playing for SC Freiburg, she tore the cruciate ligament in her right knee, this was then made worse when she suffered a bacterial infection to the same knee.

In 2022, while at Bayer Leverkusen, she injured her cruciate ligament again. In March 2023, after a 387-day absence, she returned from injury to play for Bayer Leverkusen against her former club SC Freiburg.

In the 2023–24 season, Wieder scored the equalizer in the 93rd minute in the home game against RB Leipzig, bringing the final score to 1–1.

On 1 May 2024, Frauen-Bundesliga rivals Werder Bremen announced that Wieder had signed for the 2024–25 season, making her the club's second signing for the new season after Sharon Beck.

For the 2026–27 season, she joined the newly promoted Bundesliga side VfB Stuttgart.

== Honours ==
Bayern Munich U17

- German football championship of B juniors: 2017

Germany U19

- UEFA Women's Under-19 Championship: 2016, 2017
