= Andrea Gavrić =

Bosnia and Herzegovina footballer

Personal information
- Full name: Andrea Gavrić
- Date of birth: 3 December 2001 (age 24)
- Place of birth: Bosnia and Herzegovina
- Height: 1.68 m (5 ft 6 in)
- Positions: Defender; midfielder

Team information
- Current team: 1. FC Köln
- Number: 18

Youth career
- Bayern Munich II

Senior career*
| Years | Team | Apps | (Gls) |
| 2017–2022 | Bayern Munich II | 38 | (6) |
| 2022– | 1. FC Köln | 6 | (0) |

International career^{‡}
| 2018– | Bosnia and Herzegovina | 6 | (1) |
- * Club domestic league appearances and goals as of 21 August 2022 ‡ National team caps and goals as of 23 September 2023

Andrea Gavrić (born 3 December 2001) is a Bosnian footballer who plays as a defender / midfielder for 1. FC Köln, and has appeared for the Bosnia and Herzegovina women's national team.

== Career ==
Gavrić has been capped for the Bosnia and Herzegovina national team, appearing for the team during the 2019 FIFA Women's World Cup qualifying cycle.

== International goals ==
| No. | Date | Venue | Opponent | Score | Result | Competition |
|---|---|---|---|---|---|---|
| 1. | 22 September 2023 | Ménfői úti Stadion, Győr, Hungary | Belarus | 2–1 | 2-1 | 2023-24 UEFA Women's Nations League |
