= Romy Speelman =

Dutch footballer

Personal information
- Date of birth: 24 October 2000 (age 26)
- Place of birth: Rijswijk, Netherlands
- Position: Midfielder

Youth career
- ADO Den Haag

Senior career*
| Years | Team | Apps | (Gls) |
| 2016–2019 | ADO Den Haag | 41 | (7) |
| 2019–2021 | Twente | 7 | (1) |
| 2021–2022 | ADO Den Haag | 19 | (2) |
| Total | | 67 | (10) |

International career
| 2018–2019 | Netherlands U19s | 16 | (0) |
- * Club domestic league appearances and goals as of 15:28, 24 June 2024 (UTC)

Romy Speelman (born 24 October 2000) is a Dutch former footballer who played as a midfielder.

== Club career ==
=== First spell at ADO Den Haag ===
Speelman made her league debut against Heerenveen on 11 November 2016. She scored her first league goal against PSV on 29 October 2017, scoring in the 33rd minute.

=== Twente ===
On 24 April 2019, it was announced that Speelman would join Twente. She made her league debut against Excelsior Rotterdam on 23 August 2019. She scored her first league goal against Alkmaar on 21 March 2021, scoring in the 90th+2nd minute.

=== Second spell at ADO Den Haag ===
On April 26 2021, Speelman was announced at ADO Den Haag. She made her league debut against Feyenoord on 29 August 2021. Speelman scored her first league goal against Twente on 6 May 2022, scoring in the 50th minute.

On 7 May 2022, Speelman retired to focus on her social career.

== International career ==
Speelman made her international debut against China U19s on 19 January 2018.
