= Gianna Rackow =

German footballer (born 2000)

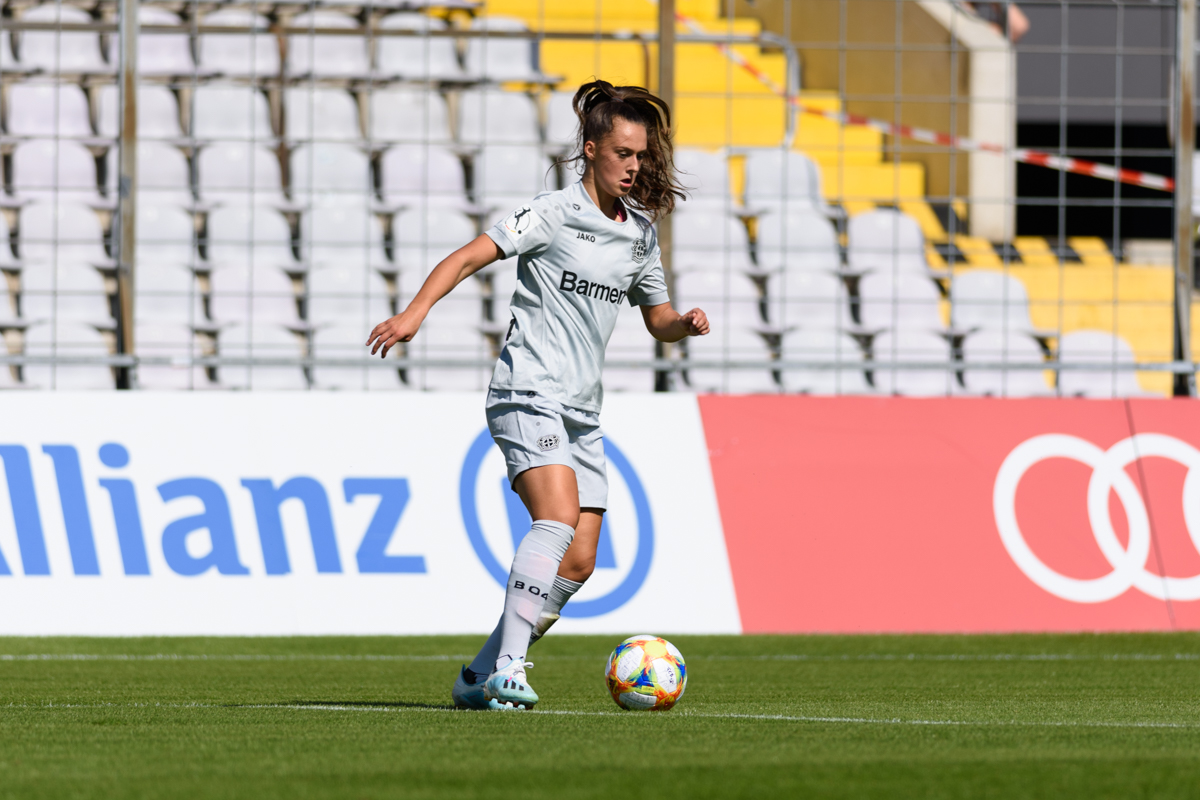
- Rackow with Bayer Leverkusen in 2019

Personal information
- Date of birth: 14 September 2000 (age 26)
- Place of birth: Germany
- Height: 1.74 m (5 ft 9 in)
- Position: Midfielder

Team information
- Current team: Vorwärts Spoho Köln
- Number: 22

Senior career*
Years	Team	Apps	(Gls)
2016–2021	Bayer Leverkusen	62	(1)
2021–2024	RB Leipzig	28	(6)
2024–	Vorwärts Spoho Köln		

International career
2015–2016	Germany U16	7	(0)
2016–2017	Germany U17	12	(6)
2017	Germany U19	1	(0)
- * Club domestic league appearances and goals as of 10:48, 9 October 2026 (UTC)

Gianna Rackow (born 14 September 2000) is a German footballer who plays as a midfielder for Regionalliga West club Vorwärts Spoho Köln.

== Honours ==
RB Leipzig

- 2. Frauen-Bundesliga: 2022–23
