= Ifigeneia Georgantzi =

Greek footballer

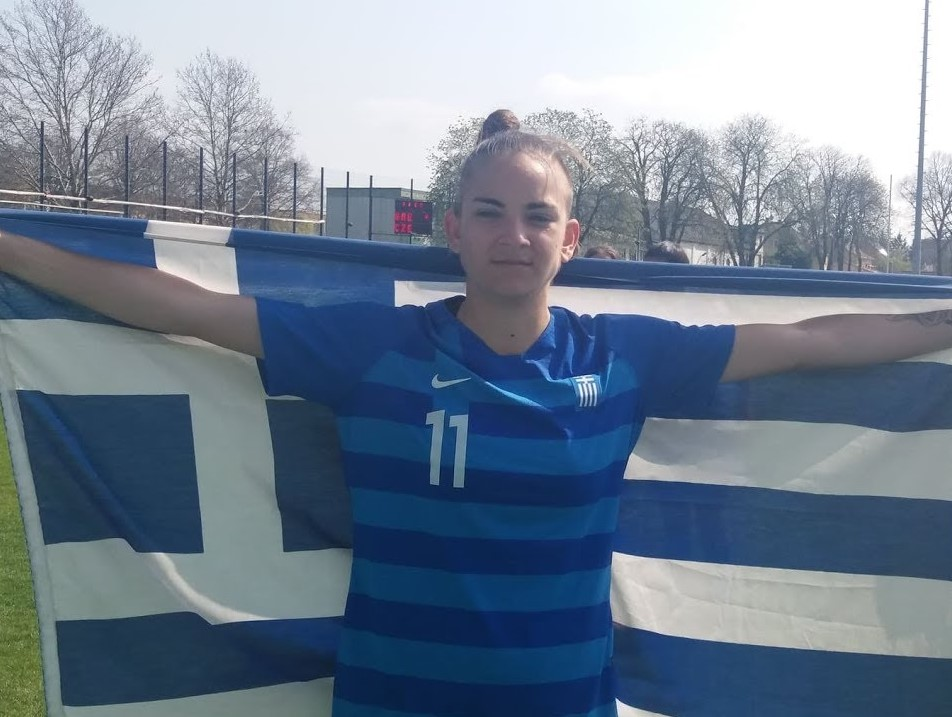
- Ifigeneia Georgantzi is a Greek footballer who plays as a midfielder /striker.

Personal information
- Date of birth: 17 August 2000 (age 26)
- Place of birth: Thessaloniki
- Height: 1.70 m (5 ft 7 in)
- Position: Midfielder

Team information
- Current team: Pyrgos AFC Women

Senior career*
Years	Team	Apps	(Gls)
2012–2016	Mentekas Kalamarias	51	(22)
2016–2020	Aris Thessalonikis	67	(33)
2020–2023	Lefkothea Latsion	45	(43)
2023–2026	Asteras Tripolis	34	(7)
2026--	Pyrgos AFC Women		

International career^{‡}
2016–2017	Greece U17	6	(4)
2017–2019	Greece U19	12	(0)
2020–	Greece	9	(0)
- * Club domestic league appearances and goals as of 31 May 2026 ‡ National team caps and goals as of 27 November 2020

Ifigeneia Georgantzi (Greek: Ιφιγένεια Γεωργαντζή; born 17 August 2000) is a Greek footballer who plays as a midfielder for Greek club Pyrgos AFC Women and the Greece women's national team.

== Club career ==
Mentekas Kalamarias (GR), Aris Ladies (GR), Lefkothea Latsion (CY), Asteras Tripolis WFC (GR)

== Awards ==
«PASP BEST11 WOMEN’S AWARDS 2020/21»

== International career ==
Georgantzi capped for Greece at senior level during the UEFA Women's Euro 2022 qualifying. Georgantzi also participated in all matches played by Greek Women's national team in the UEFA Women's Nations League 2023 .
